= 3Music Awards 2022 =

2022 3Music Awards

- Date: March 26, 2022
- Venue: Grand Arena, Accra
- Country: Ghana
- Presented by: 3Music Networks
- Hosted by: Naa Ashorkor, Jay Foley
- Most awards: KiDi (6)
- Most nominations: Kuami Eugene (16)
- Website: 3music.tv/section/award/

Television/radio coverage
- Networks
- TV3; DGN; 3MUSIC TV; HD +; 3FM

The 5th 3Music Awards was held on 26 March 2022 at the Grand Arena of the Accra International Conference Centre, in Accra to recognize the works of artists in the year under review. It was broadcast by TV3, 3MUSIC TV, DGN and HD +. The ceremony's theme was ''More Than Music'', and was held in-person with an audience following the previous year's virtual ceremony.

The nominees were announced on 15 February 2022 during a ceremony at the Teelande Tea Garden in Accra, Ghana. Kuami Eugene received the most nominations with 16, followed by Sarkodie who had 13 and KiDi who received 10 nominations.

On 14 March, Boomplay was announced as an official partner of the awards. The media steaming service sponsored three main categories of the awards; The Artiste of the Year, African Song of the Year and Breakthrough Act of the Year.

The artist of the year was won by KiDi for the second consecutive year.

== Performances ==
Artist(s)	Song(s)	Link(s)
Black Sherif	Kweku the Traveller, First & Second Sermon	
Mona 4Reall	Fine girl	
Kweku Darlington	Sika Aba Fie	
Kwame Yogot	Biibi Besi	
Kuami Eugene	Nana Kwame Ampadu Memorial	
Joe Mettle	Ye Obua Mi	
Ohemaa Mercy and Efe Grace	Ote Me Mu	
Akwaboah and Cina Soul	Obiaa	
Camidoh	Sugarcane	
Kelvyn Boy	Down flat	
Cina Soul	Feelings	
KiDi and Cina Soul	Touch it, Mon Bebe	

== Hosts ==
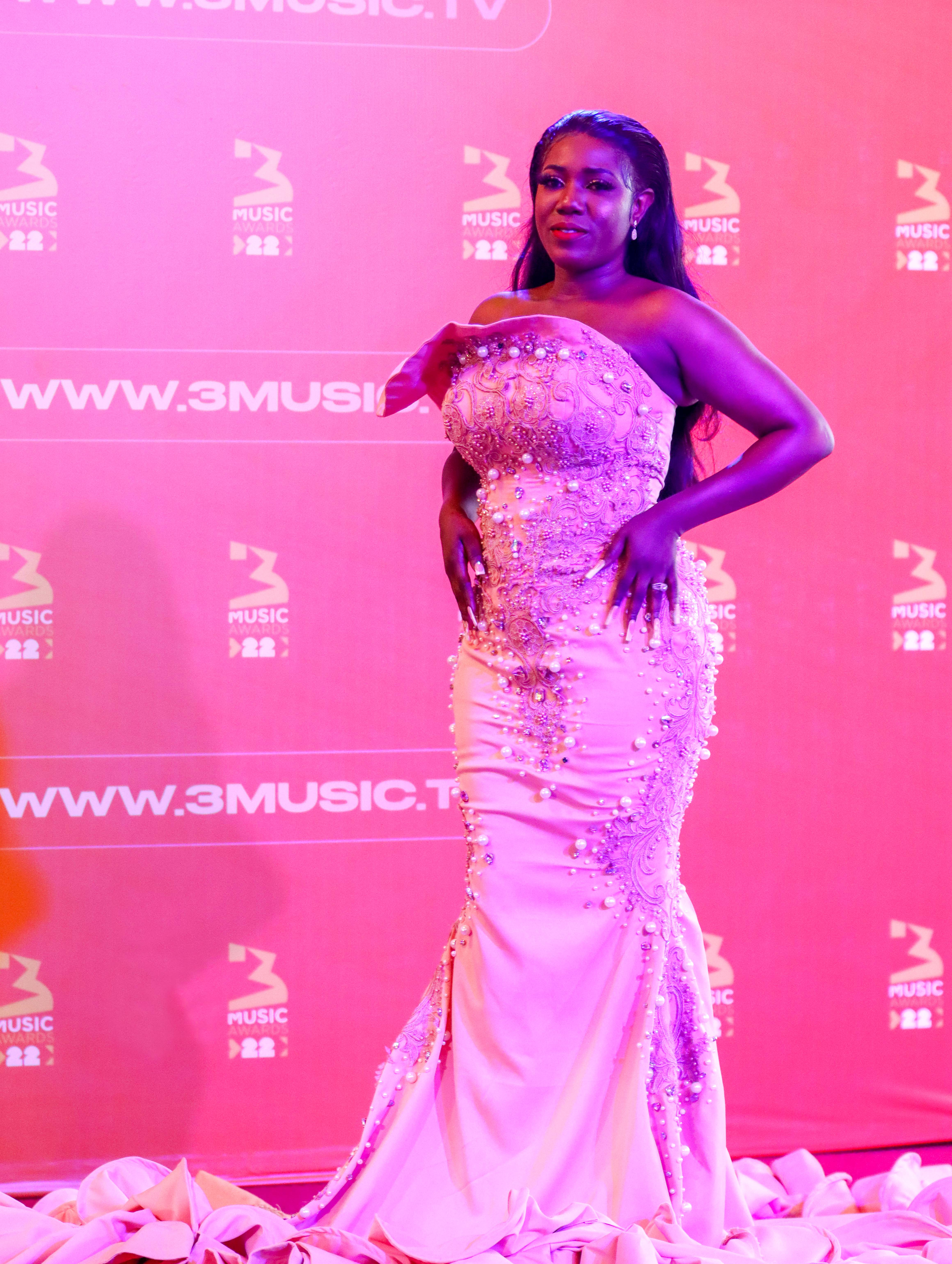
Victoria Lebene

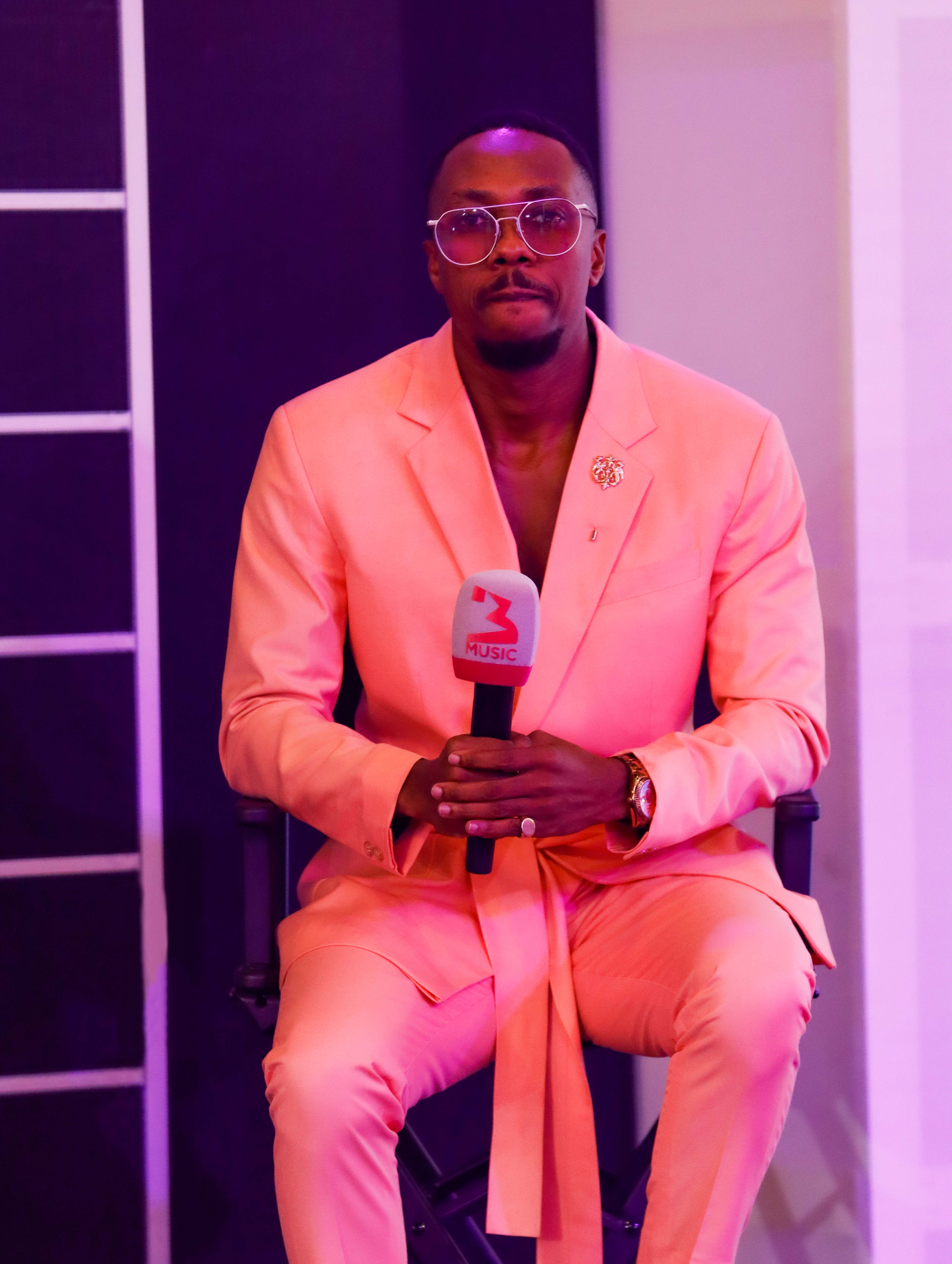
Bliss King

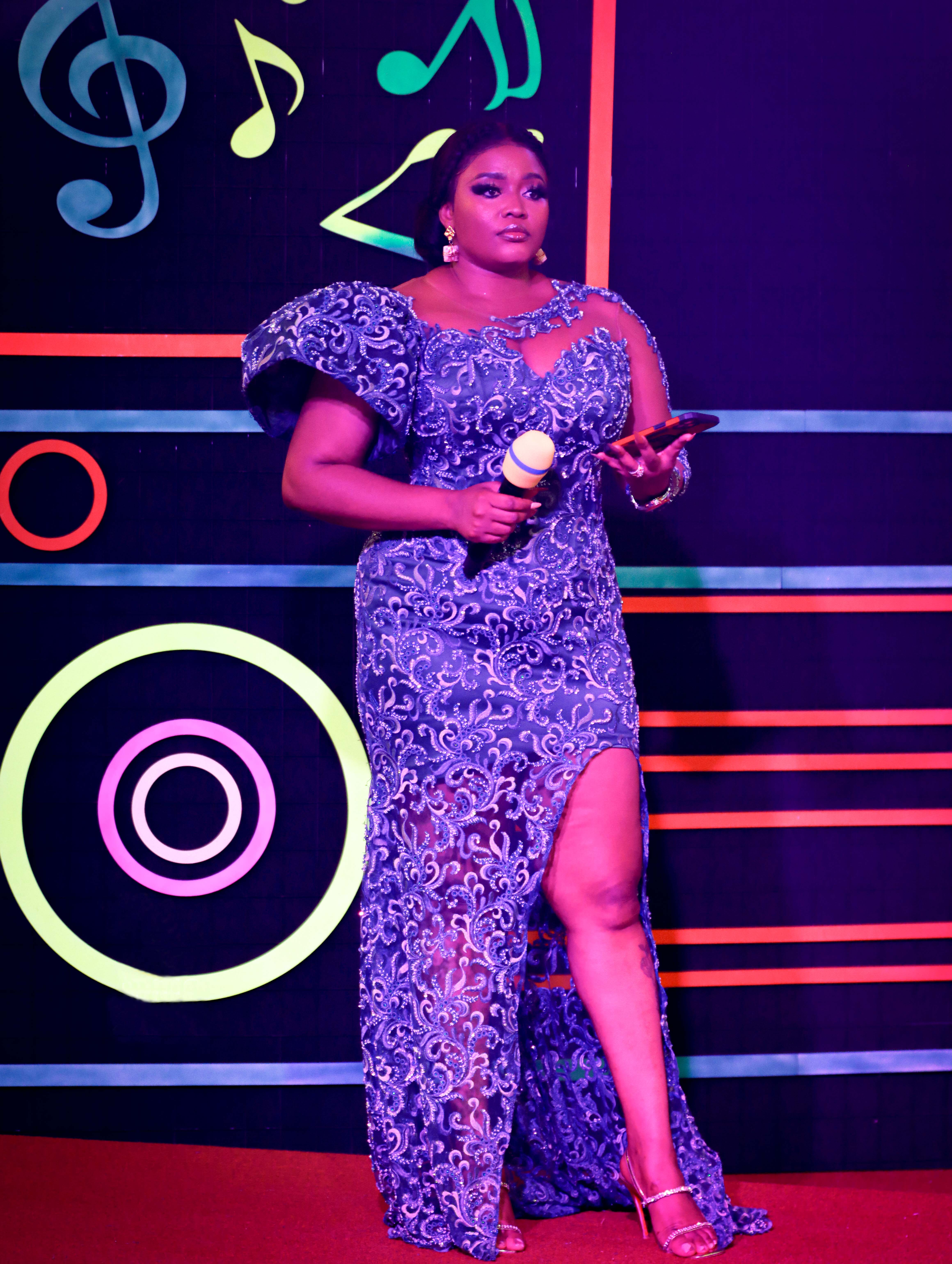
MzGee

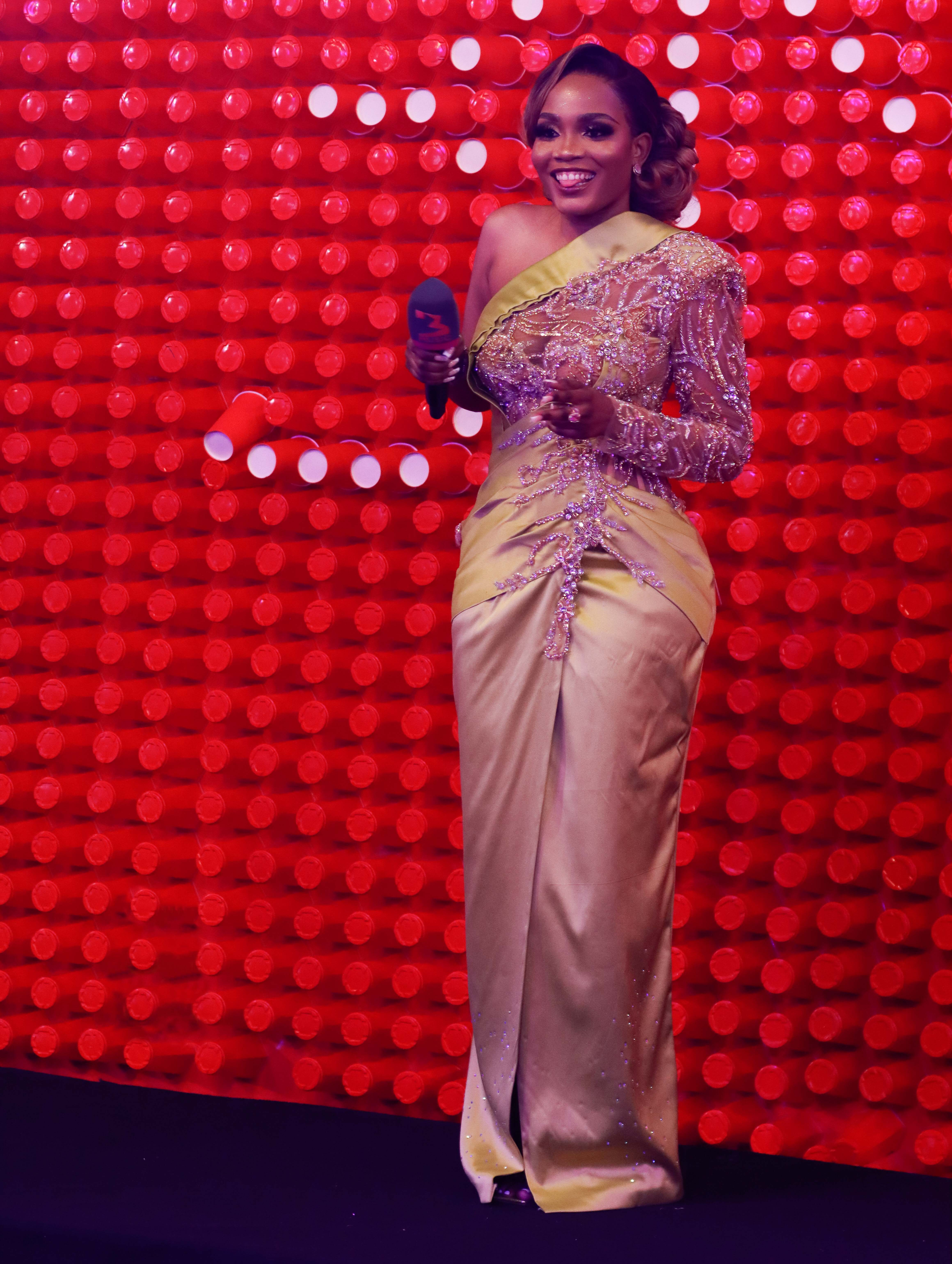
Jackie

Hosts	Period
Naa Ashorkor Mensah-Doku	Main event hosts
Jay Foley	Main event hosts
Victoria Lebene	Pre-show hosts
MzGee	Pre-show hosts
Jacquline Acquaye (Jackie)	Pre-show hosts
Bliss King	Pre-show hosts

== Winners and nominees ==
This is the list of winners for the 3Music Awards in 2022.

Artist of the Year	Breakthrough Act of the Year
KiDi; Kuami Eugene; Sarkodie; Black Sherif; Celestine Donkor; D-Black; Mr Drew; Gyakie; Stonebwoy	Black Sheriff; Abochi; Kwame Yogot; Kweku Darlington; Mona 4reall; Malcolm Nuna; Nanky; Scott Evans
Best Collaboration of the Year	African Song of the Year
‘Ekorso’ – Kofi Jamar ft. Yaw Tog and Ypee; ‘Enjoyment Minister’ – D-Black ft. Quamina MP and Stonebwoy; ‘Je M’apelle’ – Darkovibes ft. Davido; ‘Biibi Besi’ – Kwame Yogot ft. Kuami Eugene; ‘Sika Aba Fie’ – Kweku Darlington ft. Kweku Flick and Yaw Tog; ‘This Year’ – Mr Drew ft. Medikal; ‘Yeeko’ – Okyeame Kwame ft. Kuami Eugene; ‘E Choke’ – S3fa ft. Mr Drew; ‘Happy Day’ – Sarkodie ft. Kuami Eugene; ‘Activate’ – Stonebwoy ft. Davido	‘Essence (remix)’ – Wizkid ft. Tems and Justin Bieber; ‘Bloody Samaritan’ – Ayra Starr; ‘Running’ – Chiké and Simi; ‘Peru’ – Fireboy DML; ‘Ke Star (remix)’ – Focalistic ft. Davido; ‘Sip (Alcohol)’ – Joeboy; ‘Feeling’ – Ladipoe ft. Buju; ‘Monalisa’ – Lojay & Sarz; ‘Somebody's Son’ – Tiwa Savage ft. Brandy
Gospel Song of the Year	Highlife Song of the Year
‘He Lives In Me’ (Ote Me Mu) – Ohemaa Mercy ft. MOG Music; ‘Yahweh’ – Akesse Brempong; ‘Only You’ – Celestine Donkor; ‘Awurade Ye (Do It, Lord)’ – Diana Hamilton; ‘Ye Obua Mi’ – Joe Mettle; ‘Oluwa Is Involved’ – Joyce Blessing; ‘The Glory’ – Obaapa Christy; ‘Wa Sore’ – Patience Nyarko	‘Thy Grace (Part 1)’ – Kofi Kinaata; ‘Yard’ – Bisa Kdei; ‘Feelings’ – Cina Soul ft. KiDi; ‘Playboy’ – Dada Hafco ft. Akwaboah; ‘Watch Nobody’ Kelvyn Boy ft. Gyedu Blay Ambolley; ‘Kwadede’ – Kwabena Kwabena; ‘Fo’ – Mr Drew ft. Kwabena Kwabena; ‘Christ’ – Roy X Taylor
Hiplife Song of the Year	Hip-Hop Song of the Year
Sarkodie – Happy Day ft. Kuami Eugene; Amerado – Abotr3 ft. Black Sherif; Captain Planet (4×4) – Abodie ft. Kuami Eugene; Kelvyn Boy – Visa (Remix) ft. Joey B & Kwesi Arthur; Kofi Kinaata – Thy Grace (Part 2); Kweku Darlington – Sika Kankan; Mr Drew – This Year ft. Medikal; Sarkodie – Coachella ft. Kwesi Arthur	Black Sherif – Second Sermon; Black Sherif – First Sermon; Jay Bahd x City Boy x O’kenneth x Reggie x Kwaku DMC – Condemn; Joey B – Akobam; Kofi Jamar – Ekorso ft. Yaw Tog & Ypee; Kweku Darlington – Sika Aba Fie ft. Kweku Flick & Yaw Tog; Okyeame Kwame – Yeeko ft. Kuami Eugene; Sarkodie – Rollies & Cigar; Wendy Shay – Heat
Reggae/Dancehall Song of the Year	Afrobeats/Afropop Song of the Year
‘Touch it’ – KiDi; ‘Star Life’ – Jupitar ft. Shatta Wale; ‘Picture’ – Samini ft. Efya; ‘1Don’ – Shatta Wale; ‘1Gad’ – Stonebwoy; ‘Blessings’ – Stonebwoy ft. Vic Mensa	‘Praise’ – Fameye; ‘Available’ – Camidoh ft. Eugy; ‘Enjoyment Minister’ – D-Black ft. Quamina MP and Stonebwoy; ‘Je M’apelle’ – Darkovibes ft. Davido; ‘Dollar on You’ – Kuami Eugene; ‘Slow Down’ – King Promise; ‘Baajo’ – Kwesi Arthur; ‘Mood’ – Mr Drew; ‘E Choke’ – S3fa ft. Mr Drew; ‘Activate’ – Stonebwoy & Davido
Digital Act of the Year	Afrobeats/AfroPop Act of the Year
KiDi; Camidoh; Empress Gifty; Mr Drew; S3fa; Sarkodie; Shatta Wale; Stonebwoy	KiDi; Darkovibes; Gyakie; King Promise; Kelvynboy; Mr Drew; S3fa; Wendy Shay
Best Alternative Song of the Year	EP of the Year
‘Sad Girls Luv Money – Amaarae ft. Moliy; ‘Ntro Naa’ – Akwaboah; ‘Brothers Fight’ – Chris Adjei; ‘OMG’ – Cina Soul; ‘Black Tears’ – Khalifina; ‘Deja Vu’ – Moliy; ‘Mensesa Me Ho’ – Pure Akan; ‘Libilibi’ – Worlasi ft. Drvmroll	Patience – Amerado; For Times We Lost – Cina Soul; Bitter Sweet – Herman $uede; Pop – Kofi Karkari; Apetite For Destruction – Kofi Jamar; VIbes – Lyrical Joe; The Tape – Strongman; Time – Yaw Tog
Gospel Act of the Year	Highlife Act of the Year
Celestine Donkor; Akesse Brempong; Diana Hamilton; Efe Grace; Empress Gifty; Joe Mettle; Obaapa Christy; Ohemaa Mercy	Kofi Kinaata; Akwaboah; Cina Soul; Fameye; Kwabena Kwabena; Kuami Eugene
Reggae/Dancehall Act of the Year	Video of the Year
Stonebwoy; Knii Lante; Samini; Shatta Wale; Epixode	‘Rollies and Cigars’ – Sarkodie; ‘Favour’ – Edem ft. Sarkodie and Efya; ‘Odeshi’ – Epixode; ‘Cold’ – Joey B; ‘Spiritual’ – KiDi ft. Kuami Eugene, Patoranking; ‘Slow Down’ – King Promise; ‘Love Locked Down’ – Okyeame Kwame ft. Adina Thembi; ‘Goddess’ – Tiisha
DJ of the Year	Fan Army of the Year
DJ Faculty; DJ Aroma; DJ Bridash; DJ JayJay; DJ Mingle; DJ Vyrusky; DJ Xpliph; Mr Shark	Die-hard Fans of DL (Daddy Lumba); AMG Beyond Kontrol; BHIM Nation; High-grade Family; Sark Nation; Shatta Movement.; Team DH; Team Move
Song of the Year	Hiplife/Hip Hop Act of the Year
Black Sherif – Second Sermon; KiDi – Touch It; Kwame Yogot – Biibi Bbesi ft. Kuami Eugene; Kweku Darlington – Sika Aba Fie ft. Kweku Flick & Yaw Tog; Kofi Jamar – Ekorso ft. Yaw Tog & Ypee; Mr Drew – This Year ft. Medikal; Okyeame Kwame – Yeeko ft. Kuami Eugene; S3fa – E choke ft. Mr Drew; Sarkodie – Happy Day ft. Kuami Eugene; Stonebwoy ft. Davido – Activate	Black Sherif; Amerado; D-Black; Kofi Jamar; Kweku Darlington; Medikal; Sarkodie
Male Vocalist of the Year	Group of the Year
‘Mon Bebe’ – KiDi; ‘Available (remix) – Camidoh; ‘Brother's Fight’ – Chris Adjei; ‘Ye Obua Mi’ – Joe Mettle; ‘Slow Down’ – King Promise; ‘Nyame Tease’ – Kofi Owusu Peprah; ‘Mala’ – Luigi Maclean	R2Bees; Bethel Revival Choir; DopeNation; Keche
Performer of the Year	Best Female Vocal Performance
Epixode – VGMA Experience; Akwaboah – Ghana Most Beautiful; Efe Grace – 3Music Women's Brunch Performance; Eno – VGMA Performance; KiDi – Live Connect With KiDi; Mr Drew – VGMA Performance; Ohemaa Mercy – Tehillah; Stonebwoy – Anloga Junction @ 1	‘Coming Home’ – MzVee; ‘Goodbye’ – Asi Renie; ‘Overflow’ – Efe Grace; ‘Odi Yompo’ – Empress Gifty; ‘No More’ – Enam; ‘The Glory’ – Obaapa Christy; ‘Jesus’ – Queendalyn Yurglee
Producer of the Year	Rapper of the Year
M.O.G Beatz; Kaywa; Killbeatz; Kuami Eugene (Rockstar Made it); Master Garzy; Ronyturnmeup; Streetbeatz; Willisbeatz	Amerado – Best Rapper; Eno Barony – ‘God Is A Woman’ ft. Efya; Joe Kay – ‘Hayaye’; Joey B – ‘Cold’; Lyrical Joe – ‘5th August’; Medikal – ‘Stop It’; Sarkodie – ‘Rollies N Cigars’; Strongman – ‘Flawless’
Viral Song of the Year	Album of the Year
‘Na Today’ – Okese 1; ‘Second Sermon’ – Black Sherif; ‘Touch It’ – KiDi; ‘Ekorso’ – Kofi Jamar ft. Yaw Tog and Ypee; ‘Yeeko – Okyeame Kwame ft. Kuami Eugene; ‘E Choke’ – S3fa ft. Mr Drew; ‘Happy Day’ – Sarkodie ft. Kuami Eugene; ‘Heat’ – Wendy Shay	The Golden Boy – KiDi; The Angel You Don't Know – Amaarae; Loyalty – D-Black; The Experience – Joe Mettle; Inveencible – MzVee; Same Earth Different Worlds – Omar Sterling; Logos II – Pappy Kojo; No Pressure – Sarkodie
Emerging Woman of the Year	Woman of the Year
Mona 4Reall; Abi Ima; Darkua; Joa; Lizzy Ntiamoah; Moliy; Niiella; Queendalyn; Titi Owusu	Gyakie; Adina; Amaarae; Celestine Donkor; Diana Hamilton; Mona 4Reall; Ohemaa Mercy; S3fa; Wendy Shay

== See more ==
- Red carpet photos
