= Amerado =

Ghanaian rapper (born 1995)

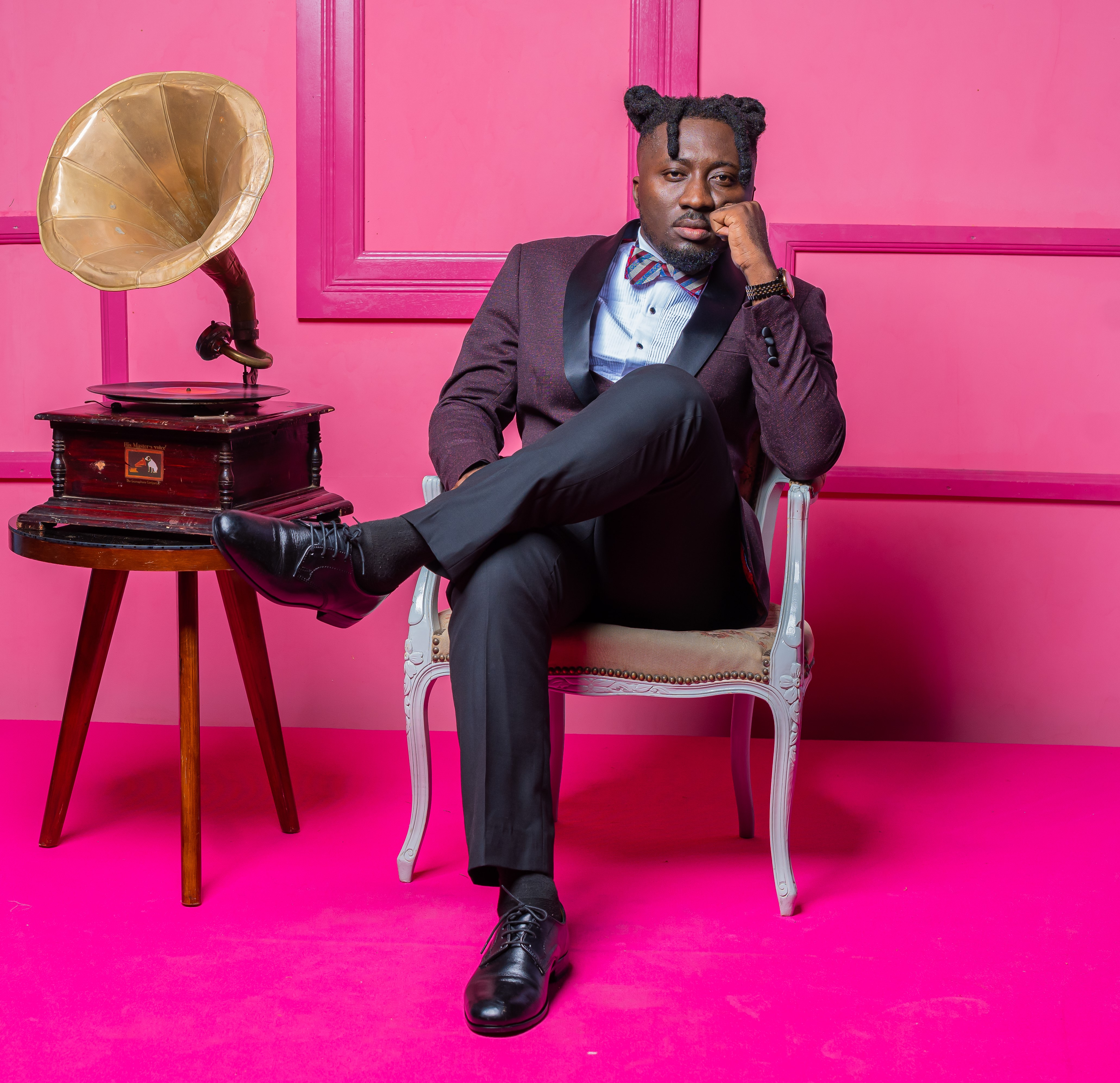
- Amerado in 2022

Background information
- Also known as: Amerado Burner, Younger K.A, Lord Immortal
- Born: Derrick Sarfo Kantanka; February 14, 1995 (age 31); Kumasi, Ghana
- Genres: Hip-hop; Hiplife; Afrobeat; Highlife
- Occupations: Rapper, singer, songwriter
- Years active: 2016–present
- Label: MicBurnerz Music

Derrick Sarfo Kantanka, (born 14 February 1995), best known as Amerado, is a Ghanaian rapper and singer from Kumasi. He is the curator of Yeete Nsem, Ghana's first news casting rap series.

== Early life and education ==
Derrick Kantanka was born and raised in Ejisu, Kumasi, in the Ashanti Region of Ghana. He attended KNUST Senior High School. Amerado is currently pursuing a degree in Political Science at the University of Ghana.

== Music career ==
After placing third at the Solid FM Freestyle Show in 2015, Amerado caught the attention of music producer, sound engineer and A&R, Azee Ntwene, who signed the rapper to his label MicBurnerz Music. Amerado was featured on a song by Mix Master Garzy intended to promote peace around the 2016 Ghanaian general election. The following year, Amerado released his first single I AM, which Pulse Ghana included among their top 10 Ghanaian songs in January 2017. He released his first EP Rapmare that November. In 2018, Amerado was featured on Sarkodie's hip-hop song "Biibi Ba", which was nominated for the Best Hiphop Song at the 2019 Vodafone Ghana Music Awards.

On 8 August 2019, Ghanaian disc jockey DJ Black released a list of the country's top 50 rappers, ranking Amerado in the forties. On 1 October 2020, Reggie Rockstone, a significant figure in the Ghanaian music genre hiplife, described Amerado as one of the most talented rappers to emerge from Ghana.

In 2020, Amerado joined Shatta Wale and other rappers in Kumasi to release Ahodwo Las Vegas. In August 2021, Amerado had a freestyle and interview session with Tim Westwood on Capital Xtra in London. GRM Daily reported his freestyle session as one of the best on the show.

Amerado released his second extended play Patience on 26 October 2021, featuring Black Sherif, Shatta Wale, Fameye, YPee and Kweku Flick, with production from Azee Ntwene, Izjoe Beatz, Samsney and ItzCJ Madeit. The EP peaked at No. 1 on music streaming platforms Apple Music, Audiomack, Boomplay and YouTube. The EP was adjudged the BEST EP at the 2022 3Music Awards. Amerado is the first Kumasi-based artist to win the Rapper of the Year award at the 3Music Awards. In May 2020, Audiomack listed Amerado in Top 10 African Artists to look out for which also featured A-Reece, Nandy, Joey B and others.

On 25 October 2022, Amerado released his debut studio album, G.I.N.A, which featured S1mba, Fameye, Eno Barony, Laioung, Efya, Gidochi, Lasmid and Epixode.

According to a post published by Peacefmonline.com, Amerado is the first rapper from Kumasi to win the Best Rapper award at both the Ghana Music Awards and the 3Music Awards.

Amerado in an interview with Jackson Mvunganyi of VOA stated that, his failed aspiration to become a football star led him to do music. On 4 December 2024, he became the third Ghanaian artiste to receive a certification plaque from Audiomack for hitting the 100 million streams milestone.

== Style ==
Amerado raps and sings mostly in the Twi dialect of the Akan language of Ghana, but he sometimes uses English as well. His stage name, Amerado, which means 'Governor' in Akan, was chosen to assert his command of the music scene.

== Brand ambassador ==
Amerado is the brand ambassador for Ghana-made chocolates, an initiative of the Ghana Cocoa Board. He wrote the song "Ghana Chocolate" to promote the campaign. He has also worked with Vodafone Ghana, AirtelTigo, HD Plus, GoTV, Cheezzy Pizza and other brands.

== Live performances ==
Amerado's notable live performances include the Vodafone Ghana Music Awards, S-Concert, Rapperholic Show, the 2019 Ghana Music Awards UK, VGMA Xperience Concert, Ghana DJ Awards, the Ghana Party in the Park, UK, Accra in Dusseldorf (Germany), Ghana Music Awards USA and 2024 Ghana Music Awards. He was the headliner for the 36th GhanaFest held in Chicago (USA).

== My Motherland Concert ==
On 28 December 2023, Amerado hosted his maiden concert at the Okese Park in Ejisu dubbed My Motherland Concert. The concert which hosted thousands of fans had support from fellow artists like Fameye, Kwadwo Nkansah, Lasmid, Eno Barony, Fancy Gadam, Kweku Darlington and others. The second edition, which attracted over 8,000 attendees, featured performances by Sista Afia, Joyce Blessing, Strongman, Yaw Tog, Kofi Jamar, and several other artists. On 28 December 2025, Amerado held the third edition of the concert attracting over 15,000 to 20,000 fans as reported by MyJoyOnline, it was co-headlined by Okyeame Kwame and JZyNO who were new faces on the bill.

== Awards and nominations ==
Year	Event	Award	Recipient/Nominated work	Result	Ref
2026	Telecel Ghana Music Awards	Reggae/Dancehall Song of the Year	Pharaoh	Pending	
2026	Telecel Ghana Music Awards	Highlife Song of the Year	Obi Adi	Pending	
2025	Ghana Music Awards USA	Songwriter of the Year	Abronoma	Nominated	
2025	Ghana Music Awards USA	Highlife Song of the Year	2 Things	Nominated	
2025	Ghana Music Awards USA	Highlife Song of the Year	Abronoma	Nominated	
2025	Ghana Music Awards USA	Collaboration of the Year	Blessing	Nominated	
2025	Ghana Music Awards USA	Hiplife/Hiphop Artist of the Year	Himself	Nominated	
2025	Telecel Ghana Music Awards	Hiplife/Hiphop Artist of the Year	Himself	Nominated	
2025	Telecel Ghana Music Awards	Reggae/Dancehall Song of the Year	Ankonam Remix	Nominated	
2025	Telecel Ghana Music Awards	Highlife Song of the Year	Abronoma	Nominated	
2024	Eastern Music Awards	Most Influential Act GH	Himself	Nominated	
2024	Eastern Music Awards	Most Viral Song GH	Kwaku Ananse	Nominated	
2024	Ghana Music Awards UK	Best Highlife Song of the Year	Kwaku Ananse	Nominated	
2024	Ghana Music Awards UK	Most Popular Song of the Year	Kwaku Ananse	Nominated	
2024	Ghana Music Awards UK	Best Rapper of the Year	Himself	Nominated	
2024	Ghana Music Awards UK	Hip Hop Song of the Year	The Hardest	Nominated	
2024	Ghana Music Awards UK	Hip Hop Artist of the Year	Himself	Nominated	
2024	Ghana Music Awards UK	Artist of the Year	Himself	Nominated	
2024	3Music Awards	Viral Song of the Year	Kwaku Ananse	Nominated	
2024	3Music Awards	Highlife Song of the Year	Kwaku Ananse	Won	
2024	3Music Awards	Hip Hop Song of the Year	The Hardest	Nominated	
2024	3Music Awards	Hiplife/Hip Hop Act of the Year	Himself	Nominated	
2024	3Music Awards	Rap Performance of the Year	The Hardest	Nominated	
2024	3Music Awards	Song of the Year	Kwaku Ananse	Nominated	
2024	Ghana Music Awards USA	Artist of the Year	Himself	Nominated	
2024	Ghana Music Awards USA	Hiplife/Hiphop Artist of the Year	Himself	Nominated	
2024	Ghana Music Awards USA	Collaboration of the Year	Kwaku Ananse Remix	Nominated	
2024	Ghana Music Awards USA	Most Popular Song of the Year	Kwaku Ananse	Nominated	
2024	Ghana Music Awards USA	Songwriter of the Year	Kwaku Ananse	Nominated	
2024	Ghana Music Awards USA	Rapper of the Year	The Hardest	Nominated	
2024	Ghana Music Awards USA	Highlife Song of the Year	Kwaku Ananse	Won	
2024	Telecel Ghana Music Awards	Highlife Song of the Year	Kwaku Ananse	Won	
2024	Telecel Ghana Music Awards	Hiplife/Hiphop Artist of the Year	Himself	Nominated	
2024	Telecel Ghana Music Awards	Collaboration of the Year	Kwaku Ananse Remix	Nominated	
2024	Telecel Ghana Music Awards	Rap Performer of the Year	The Hardest	Nominated	
2024	Telecel Ghana Music Awards	Hiphop Song of the Year	The Hardest	Nominated	
2024	Telecel Ghana Music Awards	Most Popular Song of the Year	Kwaku Ananse	Nominated	
2023	Eastern Music Awards	Most Influential Act in Ghana	Himself	Won	
2023	Ghana Music Awards UK	Best Rapper of the Year	Obiaa Boa	Nominated	
2023	Ghana Music Awards UK	Hiplife/Hiphop Artist of the Year	Himself	Nominated	
2023	Ghana Music Awards UK	Best Collaboration of the Year	Grace	Nominated	
2023	Ghana Music Awards UK	Hiplife/Hip Hop Song of the Year	Grace	Nominated	
2023	Ghana Music Awards USA	Rapper of the Year	Obiaa Boa	Won	
2023	Ghana Music Awards USA	Hiplife/Hiphop Artist of the Year	Himself	Nominated	
2023	Vodafone Ghana Music Awards	Hiplife/Hiphop Artiste of the Year	Himself	Nominated	
2023	Vodafone Ghana Music Awards	Hiplife Song of the Year	Grace	Nominated	
2023	Vodafone Ghana Music Awards	Collaboration of the Year	Grace	Nominated	
2023	Vodafone Ghana Music Awards	Rap Performer of the Year	Obiaa Boa	Won	
2023	Vodafone Ghana Music Awards	Hiphop Song of the Year	Obiaa Boa	Nominated	
2022	Central Music Awards	Ghana Popular Song of the Year	Grace	Nominated	
2022	Eastern Music Awards	Most Influential Act in Ghana	Himself	Nominated	
2022	Ghana Music Awards UK	Best Collaboration of the Year	Abotr3 (Patience)	Nominated	
2022	Ghana Music Awards UK	Best rapper of the Year	The Throne	Nominated	
2022	Ghana Music Awards UK	Hiplife/Hip Hop Song of the Year	Abotr3 (Patience)	Nominated	
2022	Ghana Music Awards UK	Hiplife/Hip Hop Artist of the Year	Himself	Nominated	
2022	Ghana Music Awards France	EP of the Year	Patience EP	Won	
2022	Ghana Music Awards France	Reggae/Dancehall Song of the Year	Sing Along	Nominated	
2022	Ghana Music Awards France	Rapper of the Year	Abotr3 (Patience)	Won	
2022	Ghana Music Awards France	Best Collaboration	Abotr3 (Patience)	Nominated	
2022	Ghana Music Awards France	Producer of the Year (Samsney)	Abotr3 (Patience)	Nominated	
2022	Ghana Music Awards France	Most Popular Song of the Year	Abotr3 (Patience)	Nominated	
2022	Ghana Music Awards France	Hip Hop Song of the Year	Abotr3 (Patience)	Won	
2022	Ghana Music Awards France	Hiplife /Hip Hop Artist of the Year	Himself	Nominated	
2022	Ghana Nigeria Music Awards Festival	Rapper of the Year	Abotr3 (Patience)	Pending	
2022	Ghana Nigeria Music Awards Festival	New Artist of the Year	Himself	Pending	
2022	Ghana Music Awards USA	Hiplife/Hiphop Artist of the Year	Himself	Nominated	
2022	Ghana Music Awards USA	Rapper of the Year	Best Rapper	Won	
2022	Vodafone Ghana Music Awards	Hiphop Song of the Year	Abotr3 (Patience)	Nominated	
2022	Vodafone Ghana Music Awards	Best Rap Performer of the Year	The Throne	Nominated	
2022	Vodafone Ghana Music Awards	Hiplife/Hiphop Artist of the Year	Himself	Nominated	
2022	3Music Awards	Rapper of the Year	Himself	Won	
2022	3Music Awards	EP of the Year	Patience EP	Won	
2022	3Music Awards	Hiplife Song of the Year	Abotr3 (Patience)	Nominated	
2022	3Music Awards	Hiplife/Hiphop Act of the Year	Himself	Nominated	
2021	Ghana Music Awards UK	Hiplife/Hiphop Artist of the Year	Himself	Nominated	
2021	Ghana Music Awards UK	Best Rapper of the Year	Himself	Nominated	
2021	Ghana Music Awards UK	New Artist of the Year	Himself	Nominated	
2021	4Syte TV Music Video Awards	Best Hiphop Video	Best Rapper	Nominated	
2021	Ghana Music Awards USA	New Artist of the Year	Himself	Nominated	
2021	Ghana Music Awards USA	Hiplife/Hip Hop Song of the Year	Twa So	Nominated	
2021	Ghana Music Awards USA	Hiplife/Hip Hop Artist of the Year	Himself	Won	
2021	Ghana Music Awards USA	Reggae/Dancehall Song of the Year	Box Of Memories	Nominated	
2021	Ghana Music Awards USA	Rapper of the Year	Himself	Nominated	
2021	Vodafone Ghana Music Awards	Rap Performer of the Year	Himself	Nominated	
2021	Vodafone Ghana Music Awards	New Artist of the Year	Himself	Nominated	
2021	Entertainment Achievement Awards	Best Music Video	Best Rapper	Nominated	
2021	3Music Awards	Best Rapper of the Year	Himself	Nominated	
2021	3Music Awards	Digital Act of the Year	Himself	Nominated	
2021	Global Music Awards Africa	Most Influential Ghanaian Act of the Year	Himself	Nominated	
2020	Muse Bangerz of the Quarter	Hiplife Song of the Quarter	Twa So	Nominated	
2020	One Awards Ghana	Rapper of the Year	Himself	Won	
2020	COPO Award	Discovery Lyricist of the Year	Himself	Nominated	
2020	Ghana Entertainment Choice Awards	Best Rapper of the Year	Himself	Won	
2020	Ashanti Music Awards	Influential Act in Ashanti	Himself	Won	
2020	Ashanti Music Awards	Best collaboration of the Year	Twa So	Nominated	
2020	Ashanti Music Awards	Artist of the Year	Himself	Nominated	
2020	Ashanti Music Awards	Best Rapper of the Year	Himself	Nominated	
2020	Greater Accra Music Awards	Non-Gama Artiste of the Year	Himself	Nominated	
2020	Eastern Music Awards	Influential Act in Ghana	Himself	Won	
2019	Emerging Music Awards Ghana	Emerging Artist of the Year	Himself	Nominated	
2019	Emerging Music Awards Ghana	Most Popular Artist of the Year	Himself	Nominated	
2019	Emerging Music Awards Ghana	Rapper of the Year	Redemption Freestyle	Nominated	
2019	Emerging Music Awards Ghana	Hiplife Artist of the Year	Himself	Nominated	
2019	Ghana Music Awards UK	Uncovered Artiste of the Year	Himself	Nominated	
2019	3Music Awards	Next Rated Act	Himself	Nominated	
2018	Ghana Music Awards SA	Most Promising Artiste	Himself	Nominated	
2018	3RD TV Music Video Awards	Best Newcomer Video		Nominated	
2018	Kumasi Awards Night	Artiste of the Year	Himself	Won	
2018	Kumasi Awards Night	Best Rapper of the Year	Himself	Nominated	
2017	Kumasi Awards Night	Artiste of the Year	Himself	Nominated	

=== Co-nominee / co-winner ===
Year	Event	Award	Recipient/Nominated work	Result	Ref
2019	Vodafone Ghana Music Awards	Hip-hop Song of the Year	Biibi Ba	Nominated	
2019	Vodafone Ghana Music Awards	Best Video of the Year	Biibi Ba	Nominated	
2019	4syte TV Music Video Awards	Overall Best Video of the Year	Biibi Ba	Nominated	
2019	4syte TV Music Video Awards	Best Hiphop Video of the Year	Biibi Ba	Won	
2019	4syte TV Music Video Awards	Best Photography	Biibi Ba	Nominated	
2019	4syte TV Music Video Awards	Best Directed Video	Biibi Ba	Nominated	
2020	3Music Awards	Hip Hop Song of the Year	Biibi Ba	Nominated	

== Videography ==
Year	Title	Director	Ref
2016	Peace Forever (as a featured act)	Yaw Skyface	
2017	I AM	L2M	
2017	Beast Attitude	L2M	
2017	At My Back	Quophi Asiama	
2018	Redemption Freestyle I	A Certain YO	
2018	Redemption Freestyle II	Lixil Montage	
2018	Menpe	Motion Master	
2018	Biibi Ba (as a featured act)	Bab Direction	
2019	Dede	Film God	
2020	Twa So	Gordon Appiah	
2020	Box of Memories	Gordon Appiah	
2020	Kyerɛ Me	Gordon Appiah	
2020	A Piece on Peace	Director K	
2020	Kumerica (as a featured act)	Kobby Shots	
2020	Ahodwo Las Vegas (as a featured act)	PKMI	
2020	Best Rapper	Gordon Appiah	
2021	Taxi Driver	Sivo	
2021	Me Ho Y3	Sivo	
2021	Younger K.A	SARP.the.KR8toR	
2021	Death Sentence	SARP.the.KR8toR	
2021	We Outside	Director Zizy	
2021	Sika Besu	Gordon Appiah	
2021	Abotr3(Patience)	Gordon Appiah	
2022	Metua	Xbills Ebenezer	
2022	The Finish Line (as a featured act)	Takyi Native	
2022	Obiaa Boa	Bra Shizzle	
2022	Grace	Bra Shizzle	
2022	Nyame Dada	Bra Shizzle	
2023	The Hardest	Prince Dovlo	
2023	Rap Is Still Alive (with Strongman)	Kobby Shots	
2023	Kwaku Ananse	Bra Shizzle	
2023	Kwaku Ananse Remix	Gordon Appiah	
2024	Abronoma	Gordon Appiah	
2024	Tin Ton Tan	Creative House	
2024	Date rush	Gordon Appiah	
2024	Playman	Director Zizy	
2024	Ankonam	Director Zizy	
2024	Angry	Bra Shizzle	
2025	The Last Prayer	The Boldz	
2025	Sacrifice, Bury The Pope, Money Journey & Status Quo (Against All Odds EP)	Gordon Appiah	
2025	Obi Adi	The Boldz	
2026	Aseda	Sniper Boy	
2026	Game Over	OD FEX	
2026	Sika Mframa	Kojo Myles	

== Discography ==
=== Selected singles ===
- I Am
- At My Back
- Beast Attitude
- Mix Master Garzy – Peace Forever (as a featured act)
- Edem – Kporda Remix (as a featured act)
- Redemption I
- Redemption II
- Menpe
- Pistol ft Cabum
- Gods ft Kuami Eugene & Koo Ntakra
- Sarkodie – Biibi Ba (as a featured act)
- Twa So ft Fameye
- Box of Memories
- Kyer3 Me ft Okyeame Kwame
- Shatta Wale – Ahodwo Las Vegas (as a featured act)
- Best Rapper
- Dawgi ft. Sarkodie
- Indelible Flow
- Taxi Driver
- Me Ho Y3
- Younger K.A
- Death Sentence
- We Outside ft Kofi Jamar
- The Throne
- Metua ft Kuami Eugene
- Eno Barony – The Finish Line (as a featured act)
- Obiaa Boa
- Back to Sender
- Grace ft Lasmid
- Fa Me Saa ft Kwaku DMC
- The Hardest
- Kwaku Ananse
- Kwaku Ananse Remix ft Fameye
- Abronoma
- Tin ton tan
- Sista Afia – 2 Things (as a featured act)
- Date Rush
- Shatta Wale – Blessings (as a featured act)
- Playman ft King Paluta
- Ankonam Remix ft Samini
- Nana Acheampong – Ase Mene Wo (as a featured act)
- I Am Aware
- Angry
- The Last Prayer
- Merry Go Round
- Asor ft JZyNO
- Pharaoh
- Obi Adi
- Aseda ft Kweku Flick, Kofi Jamar, Strongman, Bro Sammy, YPee, Oseikrom Sikanii and Okyeame Kwame
- Game Over ft Fuse ODG
- Obiaa Nte Mase
- Return Of The Lunatic
- Fortune and Flesh
- Wo Ex Bedwa

=== Extended Plays ===
- Rapmare (2017)
- Patience (2021)
- Young And Strong (2023)
- The Gold Coin (2024)
- Against All Odds (2025)
- Defy All Odds (2025)
- The Price Of Becoming (2026)

=== Albums ===
- G.I.N.A (2022)
