= Cina Soul =

Ghanaian musician (born 1996)

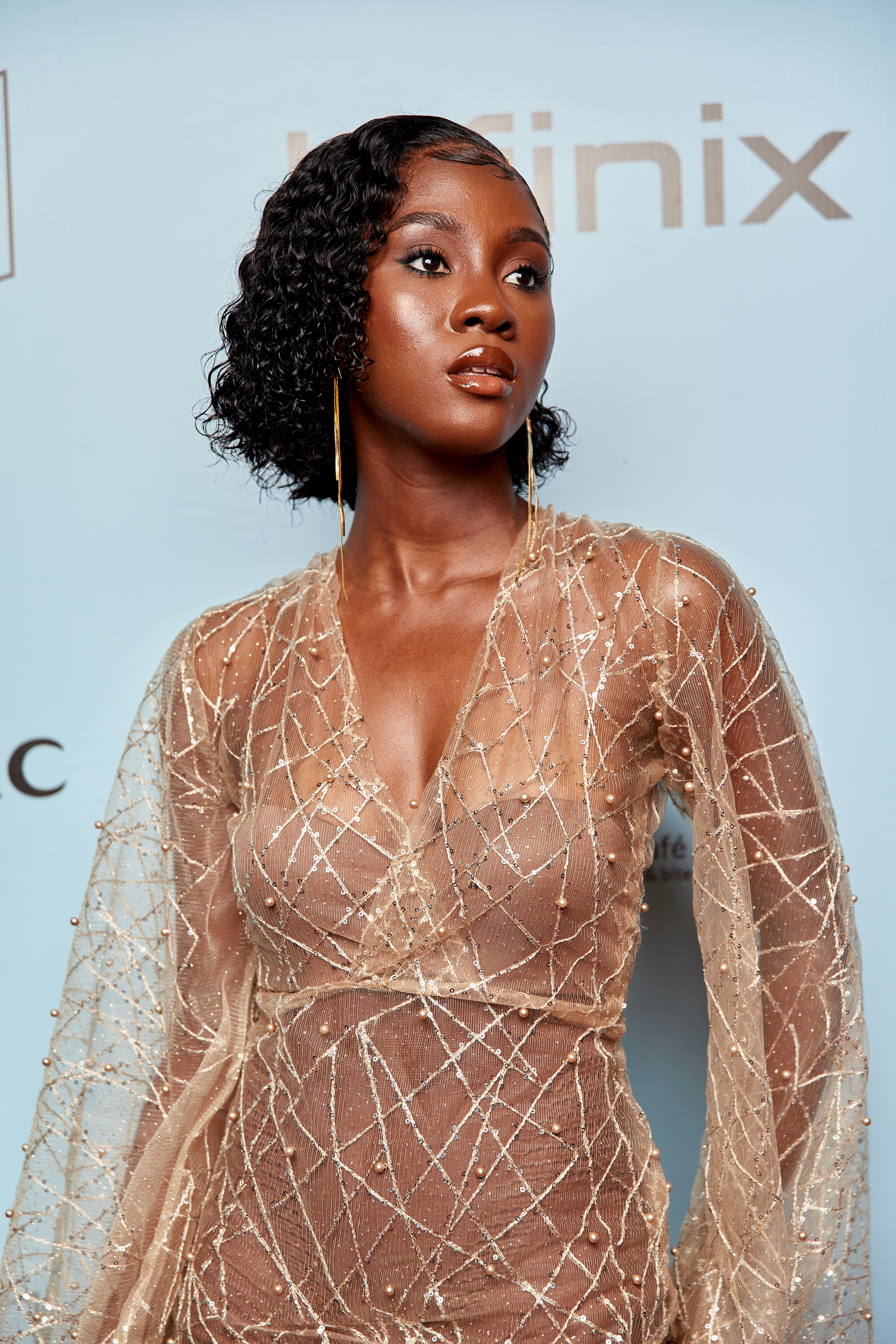

Background information
- Born: Christie Quincyna Quarcoopome; 3 May 1996 (age 30); Accra, Ghana
- Genres: Highlife; afro-pop; neo soul; afro-soul; pop; jazz
- Occupations: Singer; songwriter; performer
- Years active: 2014–present
- Label: Universal Music Group

Christie Quincyna Quarcoopome (born 3 May 1996), known professionally as Cina Soul, is a Ghanaian singer, songwriter and performer. She was a finalist at the 2014 Vodafone Ghana Music Icons competition held in Accra, Ghana.

== Early life ==
Christie Quincyna Quarcoopome was born and raised in Kokomlemle, Ghana, and Accra to Ghanaian parents and hails from Jamestown in Accra. She is a native of the Ga Tribe of Ghana. Cina Soul had her junior high school education at Deyoungsters International School and her senior high school education at Aburi Girls Senior High School, and she continued to study psychology and archaeology at the University of Ghana. Cina is the second of three children; she has an older and younger sister.

== Musical career ==
=== Early career ===
Cina Soul's first attempt at music was her participation in the Vodafone Ghana Music Icons in 2014, where she emerged as a finalist. After which, we saw a series of mashups and covers of some mainstream songs, including Mr. Eazi's Bankulize and Cyna's Bamidele. In 2016, Cina released her debut album, "Metanoia," featuring M.anifest, Worlasi, and KiDi, the record that led her to the spotlight, earning her a spot on the charts with singles Awo and Julor. Cina Soul was immensely involved in the Black Girls Glow Project, which was launched in 2017 by Dzyadzorm and Poetra Asantewa. Alongside acts like Adomaa, Fu, and Ria Boss, the group released their first album, Mother of Heirs, in July 2017. Cina Soul performed at the Allianz Awards [6] at the Goethe-Institut in December 2017 alongside Nana Yaa at "Ghana Goes Germany" and the Vodafone Ghana Music Awards in 2017. She also hosted her own concert, "Metanoia X."

=== Universal Music Group ===
Earlier in 2018, Cina Soul released her first single after her EP, '00:01'[1] [2], which led to her being signed by the Universal Music Group. [3] She released her second record this year, "12:01," under the new record label. She released her second record and debut single under the Universal Music imprint in August 2019, titled Adukwei. The song, produced by Nii Quaye and performed in her local Ga dialect, was recorded ahead of the 2019 edition of the Homowo festival, a festival celebrated by the Ga people of Ghana.

== Artistry ==
Cina Soul boasts a diverse vocal range but settles within the genres of soul, R&B, and highlife music. Cina Soul's music is written and sung in both English and Ga. She admits that most of her songs are derived from personal experiences.

== Influences ==
Cina Soul's musical inspiration is derived strongly from Western influences. Her other musical influences are Anita Baker, Brandy, Sade, Aretha Franklin, Aṣa and Whitney Houston. She seeks artists with similar voice textures to hers and gleans from their experiences to enrich her own.

== Discography ==
Year	Title	Production credit	Album	Ref
2016	Julor (feat. M.anifest)	Odunsi	Metanoia (EP)	
2016	Lovers' Tiff	Odunsi	Metanoia (EP)	
2016	Lolonye (feat. Worlasi)	Odunsi	Metanoia (EP)	
2016	Baddo (feat. KiDi)	Odunsi	Metanoia (EP)	
2016	Mama No Like Me	Odunsi	Metanoia (EP)	
2016	Next To You	Odunsi	Metanoia (EP)	
2016	Awo	Odunsi	Metanoia (EP)	
2017	Fresh Air (with Ria Boss, Poetra Asantewa)	Keyzuz	Mother of Heirs	
2017	Doing The Most (with Ria Boss, Poetra Asantewa, Adomaa)	Alex Wondergem	Mother of Heirs	
2017	Dumb (with Poetra Asantewa, Ria Boss)	EDWVN	Mother of Heirs	
2017	Conversations (Interlude) (with Ria Boss, Poetra Asantewa, Adomaa)	KMRU	Mother of Heirs	
2017	Haystack (with Dzyadzorm)	Colin Shin	Mother of Heirs	
2017	Black is The Power (with Adomaa, Fu)	Alex Wondergem	Mother of Heirs	
2017	Humpty Dumpty (with Poetra Asantewa)	Samplified	Mother of Heirs	
2017	Child's Play (with Ria Boss, Poetra Asantewa, Fu, Adomaa)	Nii Quaye	Mother of Heirs	
2018	00:01	SFC Productions	Single	
2018	12:01	Pheelz	Single	
2018	Hmmmh (feat. Ko-Jo Cue & Shaker)	BBnz	Pen & Paper	
2019	Adukwei	NiiQuaye	Single	
2019	Killi Mi	NiiQuaye	Single	
2021	Falling	NiiQuaye	For Times We Lost (EP)	
2021	SPAttention	GuiltyBeatz	For Times We Lost (EP)	
2021	OMG	GuiltyBeatz	For Times We Lost (EP)	
2021	Feelings (feat. KiDi)	KiDi, DatbeatGod, Richie Mensah	For Times We Lost (EP)	
2021	Jamestown	NiiQuaye	For Times We Lost (EP)	
2022	Waiting (feat. Camidoh)	Konfem	Did i Lie	
2023	Plenty Evil	JordanBeatz	Single	
2024	Too Bad	DJ Breezy	Did I Lie	
2024	Different Place		Did I Lie	
2024	Suloli (feat. OliveTheBoy)	Jesse Kyng	Did I Lie	
2025	Larger Than Life (feat. Stonebwoy)	JordanBeatz Diago Bernardo	Did I Lie	
2025	Ojorley		Did I Lie	
2025	Tuff Times	Diaggo Bernardo Master Maison	Did I Lie	
2025	Breathe	JordanBeatz	Did I Lie	
2025	Plenty Evil	JordanBeatz	Did I Lie	
2025	Good Lies	JordanBeatz Diago Bernardo	Did I Lie	
2025	Personal	JordanBeatz Diago Bernardo	Did I Lie	
2025	Big Manye (feat. S3fa, Elestee and Titi Owusu)	JordanBeatz Diago Bernardo	Did I Lie	
2025	Feelings (feat. KiDi)		Did I Lie	
2025	Something small (feat. Juls, Worlasi)	Juls	Did I Lie	
2025	Basintale	JordanBeatz Diago Bernardo	Did I Lie	
2025	Arizona (feat. Mr Drew)	Diaggo Bernardo Master Maison	Did I Lie	
2025	Different Place	bEATZ vampire	Did I Lie	
2025	Suloli (feat. OliveTheBoy)	Jesse Kyng	Did I Lie	
2025	Too Bad (feat. Sarkodie, O'Kenneth	DJ Breezy	Did I Lie	
2025	Sexy Riddim	Diago Bernardo Kayso	Did I Lie	
2025	Waiting (feat. Camidoh)	Konfem	Did I Lie	

== Videography ==
Year	Title	Director	Ref
2018	00:01	Andy Madjitey	
2018	12:01	Director K	

== Awards and nominations ==
Year	Organization	Award	Nominated work	Result
2019	MTN 4syte TV Music Video Awards	Best Photography	Ojorley	Won
2020	Vodafone Ghana Music Awards	Best Video of the Year	Killi Mi	Won
2020	3Music Awards	Video of the Year	Ojorley	Nominated
2020	3Music Awards	Highlife Song of the Year	Ojorley	Nominated
2020	3Music Awards	Female Act of the Year	Herself	Nominated
2020	3Music Awards	Female Vocalist of the Year	Herself	Nominated
2020	3Music Awards	Highlife Act of the Year	Herself	Nominated
2020	3Music Awards	Best Live Performance	3Music Awards	Nominated
2021	Vodafone Ghana Music Awards	Record of the Year	Die 4 U	Nominated
2021	Vodafone Ghana Music Awards	Female Vocalist of the Year	Die 4 U	Nominated
2022	3Music Awards	EP of the Year	For Times We Lost	Nominated
2022	3Music Awards	Best Alternative Song of the Year	OMG	Nominated
2022	3Music Awards	Highlife Act of the Year	Herself	Nominated
