= List of Ghanaian awards =

Ghanaian Awards List

This is a list of the various award ceremonies held in Ghana to reward people in the arts, fashion, entertainment, football, entrepreneurship and other sectors.

- GUBA Awards
- Ghana Movie Awards
- Vodafone Ghana Music Awards
- 4Syte Music Video Awards
- RTP Awards
- Eastern Music Awards
- Ghana DJ Awards
- 3RD TV Music Video Awards
- Ghana Football Awards
- Golden Movie Awards
- 3Music Awards
- Glitz Style Awards
- WatsUp TV Africa Music Video Awards
- Ghana Music Awards USA
- Western Music Awards - Ghana

== See also ==
- Lists of awards
