= Eno Barony =

Ghanaian rapper (born 1991)

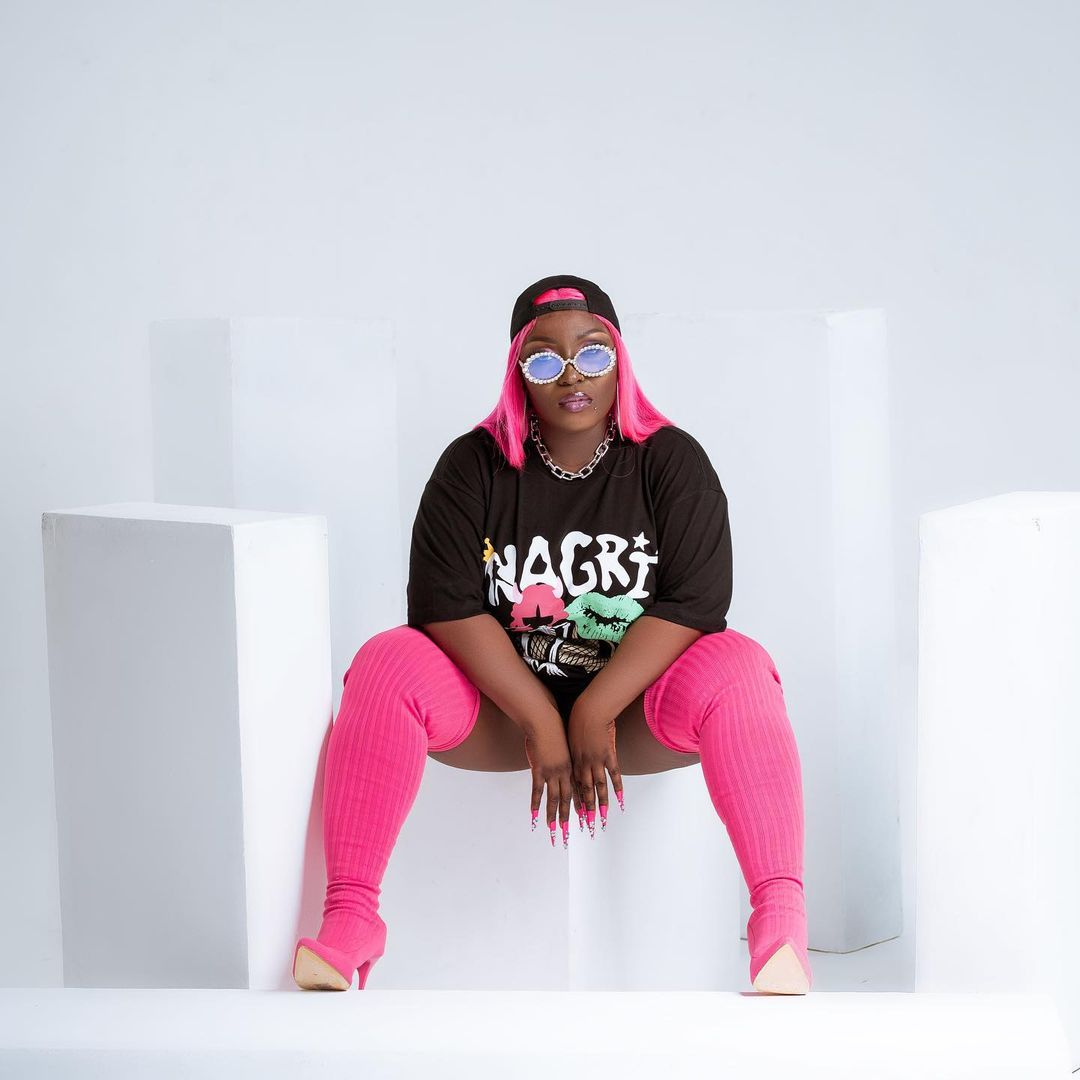

Background information
- Born: Ruth Nyame Adom; 30 October 1991 (age 34); Tema, Ghana
- Genres: Hip Hop; Afrobeats; Hiplife
- Occupations: Rapper, Song writer, Performer
- Years active: 2012–present
- Label: Magic Mindx Music
- Website: ENOBARONY.COM

Ruth Eno Adjoa Amankwah Nyame Adom (born 30 October 1991), known professionally by her stage name Eno Barony, is a Ghanaian rapper singer and songwriter Born in Tema, in the Greater Accra Region of Ghana. Prior to gaining mainstream recognition, Eno Barony released several singles and mixtapes, including Whats Ma Name, Pendrive, and Tonga, among others. Her 2018 release, Fear No Man, marked a significant turning point in her career, establishing her as one of the leading rappers in Ghana. She made history as the first Ghanaian female rapper to receive a nomination for the Best Rapper category at a major national award scheme.

== Early life and education ==
Eno Barony was born Ruth Eno Adjoa Amankwah Nyame Adom in Tema, Ghana, to Reverend Abraham Nyame Adom and Rebecca Nyame Adom. Eno began her schooling at Shallom Preparatory School, and went to Cambridge Academy for her lower elementary education. She attended junior high at Methodist J.H.S and senior secondary education at Methodist Day Secondary School, before attending Kumasi Polytechnic.

== Music career ==
Though having previously recorded several singles, Eno came to wider attention after releasing the single "Tonga" in 2014, which received commercial airplay. She released "Megye Wo Boy", a collaboration with Abrewa Nana, in 2015. Her mother died the same year. After several months of mourning, she released "The Best" with Togolese artist and brand ambassador Mic Flammez. She recorded a single, "Daawa", with Shatta Wale in 2016. The same year, she collaborated with rapper Kwaw Kese on a single called "GARI". She participated in two other collaborations, "Touch the Body" with Stonebwoy and "King of Queens" with Medikal. In 2017, she released a song titled "Juice Me" followed by another single with Ebony Reigns, titled "Obiaa Ba Ny3".

== Awards, nominations and achievements ==
Though known for rapping, she was a member of the Save Mama Today project with Stay Jay, FlowKing Stone, Dr. Cryme, and other notable artists. In 2014, she was nominated for a Vodafone Ghana Music Award in the inaugural year of the unsung category. She performed alongside Popcaan and Jah Vinci at Ghana Music Week, held at the Accra Sports Stadium. She also headlined the Closeup festival alongside fellow Ghanaian rapper Sarkodie. She has been nominated for the Jigwe awards, and her collaboration with Mic Flammez was nominated for "Best Hiphop Video" at the 4Syte Music Video Awards. She ran for the Best Female Rapper award and was nominated for the Jigwe Award for Best New Act the following year. In 2015, she played for the third year in a row at the Ghana Music Week Festival, and performed at both the Ghana DJ Awards and Ghana Freedom Concert (S Concert). The same year, she headlined the Joy FM Old School reunion alongside Stonebwoy before participating in Adom FM's Temafest in 2016 . She was the music commissioner for Ghana Meets Naija 2017, and was a nominee for Best Rapper at Vodafone in 2018. In November 2020, she won the African Muzik Magazine Awards (AFRIMMA) award for Best Best Female Rap Act in Africa.

In March 2021, she was named one of the Top 30 Most Influential Women in Music by the 3Music Awards Women's Brunch. She became the first female artist in Ghana to have won 'Rapper of the Year' award at the 2021 3Music Awards, and beat out Sarkodie, Amerado, Medikal, Strongman and Joey B to become the first Ghanaian female to be awarded Best Rapper at the VGMA in 2021.

== Awards and nominations ==
Year	Organization	Category	Nominated work	Result	Ref
2023	African Muzik Magazine Awards	Best Best Female Rap Act in Africa	Herself	Pending	
2023	Ghana Music Awards UK	Best Rapper of the Year	Herself	Pending	
2021	VGMA	Best Hiplife Song of the Year	Enough is Enough ft. Wendy Shay	Nominated	
2021	VGMA	Best Hip-hop Song of the Year	Force Dem to play nonsense ft Sister Derby & Strongman	Nominated	
2021	VGMA	Best Rap Performance	God is a Woman	Won	
2021	VGMA	Best Hiplife/Hip-hop Artiste of the Year	Herself	Nominated	
2021	3Music Award	Rapper of the Year	Herself	Won	
2020	African Muzik Magazine Awards	Best Best Female Rap Act in Africa	Herself	Won	

== Discography ==
=== Singles ===
- "Juicy Me"
- "Wats Ma Name"
- "Mene Woaa" ft Yaa Pono
- "Drive Me Crazy"
- "Love and Pain" ft Kesse
- "Tonga"
- "Megye Wo Boy" ft Abrewa Nana
- "Daawa" ft Shatta Wale
- "The Best" ft Mic Flammez
- "Touch the Body" ft Stonebwoy
- "King of Queens" ft Medikal
- "Obiaa Ba Ny3" ft Ebony Reigns
- "Gari" ft Kwaw Kese
- "Fear No Man"
- "Beauty and The Beast"
- "Do Something"
- "Do Something" Remix ft Wendy Shay
  "Ay3 Ka"

=== 2019 Singles ===
- "Heavy Load"
- "Mind Your Business" Kofi Mole
- "Falling In Love"

=== "Voice Of Truth" Akwaboah ===
Source:

=== 2020 Singles ===
- "Rap Goddess"
- "Argument Done"
- "force dem to play nonsense" ft Sister Deborah and Strongman
- "Cheat" ft Kelvyn Boy
- "Game Of Thrones"
- "Enough Is Enough" ft Wendy Shay

=== 2021 Singles ===
- "4Eva" ft Yaw Tog

=== 2022 Singles ===
- "The Finish Line" ft Amerado

=== 2023 Singles ===
- "Lowkey"
- "Chairman (Freestyle)"

=== 2024 ===
- Soja Go Soja Come
- Boozen
- Ride or Die ft Amerado
- Good Enough

== Albums ==
- Yaa Asantewaa
- Ladies First
- No Manual

== Videography ==
Year	Title	Director	Ref
2012	Pull Me Out	Nick Baeta	

== Performances ==
- Ghana Meets Naija Concert, May 2017 at the Accra International Conference Centre.
- GOtv Launch Street Party 2013 in Kumasi.
- Akwambo Music Festival 2017
- Rapperholic Concert 2017
- Eno Barony - Mommy
