= Kweku Darlington =

Ghanaian musician (born 1996)

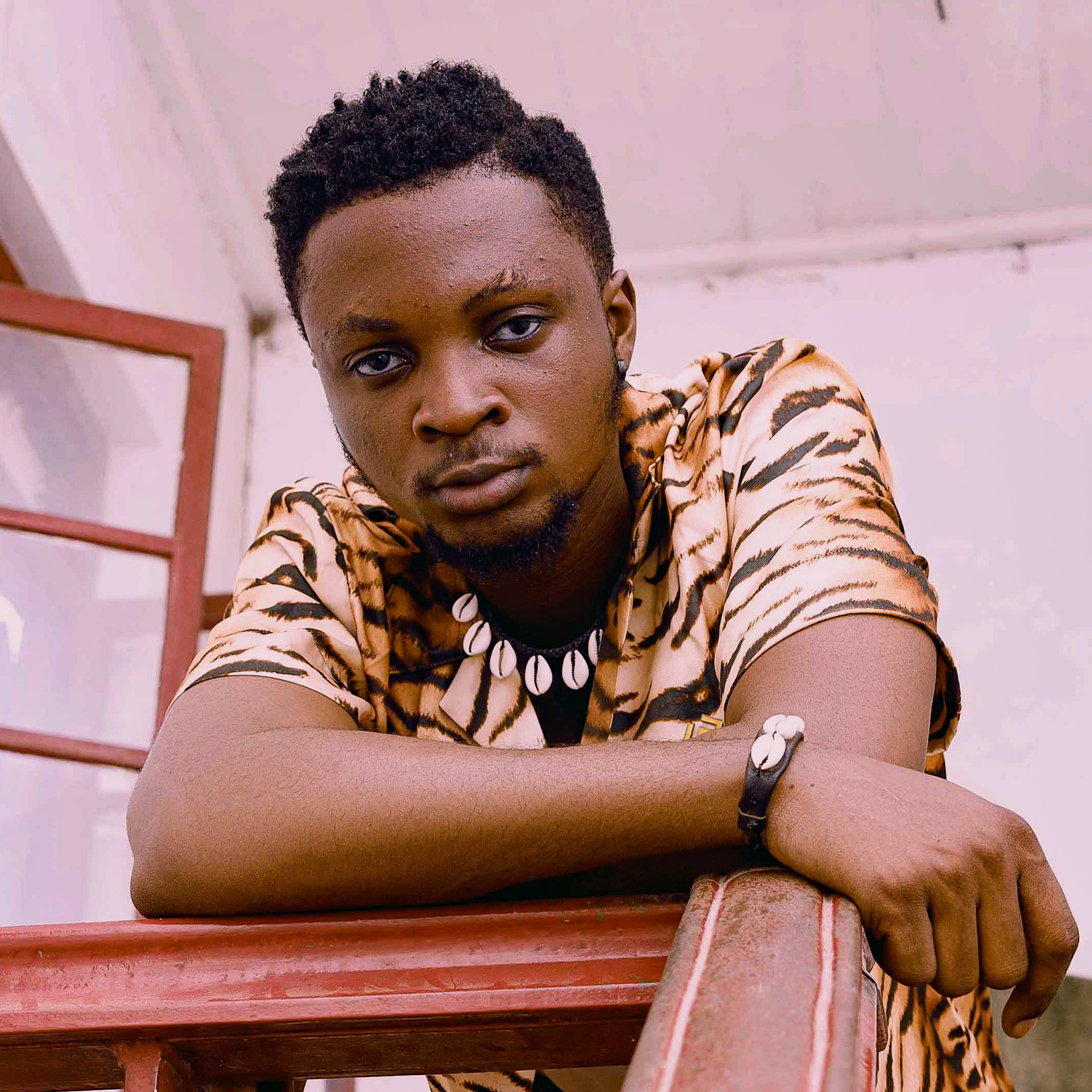
- Kweku Darlington - Darling Boy

Background information
- Born: Emmanuel Kweku Owusu Darlington; 17 July 1996 (age 30); Kumasi, Ghana
- Genres: Hiplife, Drill music, rap, hip hop
- Occupations: Musician, rapper
- Years active: 2016-present
- Label: SHAK MUSIQ

Emmanuel Kweku Owusu Darlington (born 17 July 1996), popularly known as Kweku Darlington, is a Ghanaian musician, songwriter and producer from Kumasi. He became popular with the hit song 'Sika Aba Fie'. He released a remix of the song which featured Fameye, Kuami Eugene, Yaw Tog and Kweku Flick.

== Career ==
Darlington began writing and recording music at the age of 14. In 2019, he entered the TV3 Mentor Reloaded reality show edition. He made it into the boot camp but was evicted during the first eviction show on 12 January 2020. After leaving the show, he released several singles in 2020 including; PEACE (say no to xenophobia), Here We Go, Owuo, Promise, Obaa ne Barima and Nyansa. Obaa ne Barima was the most successful amongst those singles based on radio airtime play and video streams. On 21 March 2021, he released Sika Aba Fie which featured Yaw Tog and Kweku Flick. The song became one of the hit songs in the 2021 year. It was on the Ghana's radio top charts for several weeks. This brought more attention to his talent and songs with the media referring to him as one of the breakout stars of 2021. On 14 May 2021, he released a remix of "Sika Aba Fie", featuring Fameye, Kuami Eugene, Yaw Tog and Kweku Flick.

In February 2022, Darlington was nominated in six award categories for the 2022 3Music Awards with Sika Aba Fie earning three of them for Best Collaboration of the Year, Hip Hop Song of the Year and Song of the Year. He was also nominated for the Breakthrough Act of the Year and Hiplife/Hip Hop Act of the Year.

== Discography ==
- ONIPA featuring Fameye & Okyeame Kwame
- Baabi Awu
- Aketesia featuring Laycon & Medikal
- Sika Kankan
- Sika Aba Fie Remix featuring Fameye, Kuami Eugene, Yaw Tog & Kweku Flick
- Sika Aba Fie featuring Yaw Tog & Kweku Flick
- Obaa ne Barima
- Nyansa
- Defender
- Promise
- Owuo
- Here We Go
- Happy Day
- Happy Day Remix featuring Yaw Tog, Kweku Flick & Amerado.
- Pain
- Bad People Do Good featuring Amerado.
- Grateful To Your Ex

== Videography ==
Below are some selected videos as shown on his YouTube channel here:

- ONIPA featuring Fameye & Okyeame Kwame
- Baabi Awu
- Aketesia featuring Laycon & Medikal
- Sika Kankan
- Sika Aba Fie Remix featuring Fameye, Kuami Eugene, Yaw Tog & Kweku Flick
- Sika Aba Fie featuring Yaw Tog & Kweku Flick
- Obaa ne Barima
- Nyansa
- Promise
- Owuo
- Here We Go
- Grateful To Your Ex

== Awards and nominations ==
Year	Ceremony	Award	Nominated work	Result	Ref
2022	Vodafone Ghana Music Awards	Best Hiphop Song	Sika Aba Fie Remix	Nominated	
2022	Vodafone Ghana Music Awards	Collaboration of the Year	Sika Aba Fie Remix	Nominated	
2022	Vodafone Ghana Music Awards	Best New Artiste	Himself	Nominated	
2022	3Music Awards	Best Collaboration of the Year	Sika Aba Fie	Nominated	
2022	3Music Awards	Breakthrough Act of the Year	Himself	Nominated	
2022	3Music Awards	Hip Hop Song of the Year	Sika Aba Fie	Nominated	
2022	3Music Awards	Hiplife Song of the Year	Sika Kankan	Nominated	
2022	3Music Awards	Hiplife/Hip Hop Act of the Year	Himself	Nominated	
2022	3Music Awards	Song of the Year	Sika Aba Fie	Nominated	
