= Wendy Shay =

Ghanaian singer

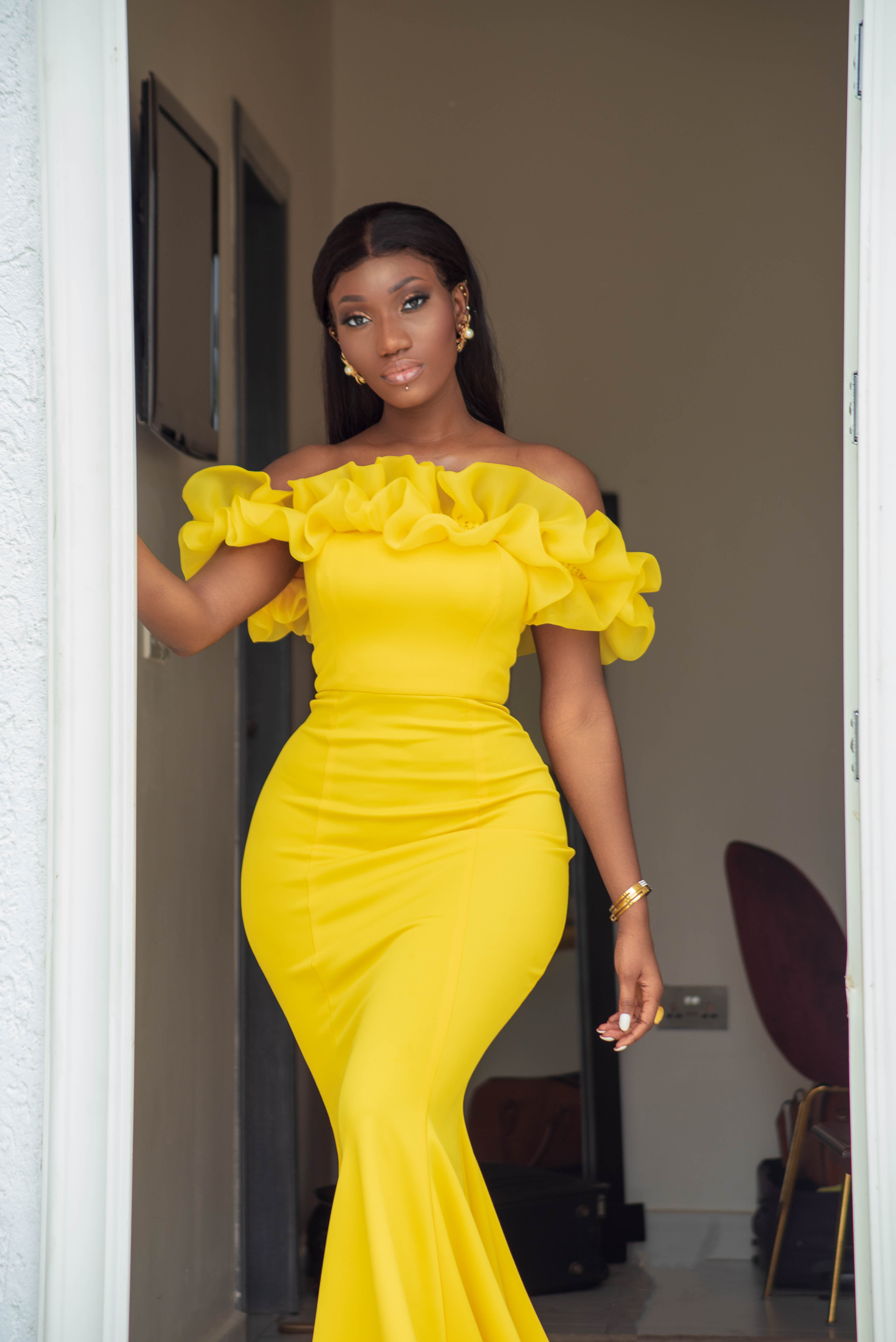

Background information
- Born: Wendy Asiamah Addo; 20 February 1996 (age 30); Accra, Greater Accra Region, Ghana
- Genres: Afropop; Afrobeats
- Occupations: Singer; songwriter; actress
- Instrument: Vocals
- Years active: 2018–present
- Label: RuffTown

Wendy Asiamah Addo (born 20 February 1996), known by the stage name Wendy Shay, is a Ghanaian singer. In March 2021, she was named among the Top 30 Most Influential Women in Music by the 3Music Awards Women's Brunch.

== Early childhood ==
Wendy Shay was born on 20 February 1996 in Accra, a suburb of the Greater Accra Region of Ghana. She was born to Mr. and Mrs. Addo from Obo, Kwahu, Ghana's Eastern Region. After the death of her father, she relocated to Stuttgart, Germany with her three siblings. Wendy's love of music grew after the death of her father when she was four years old.

She attended Morning Star School and St Martin de Porres in Accra before relocating to Stuttgart, where she continued her education from grade 7 (JHS 1). She also attended a music school in Bernhausen in Germany.

== Career ==
Shay is a trained nurse by profession. She worked as a midwife in the clinical field until she moved to Ghana to pursue her musical dreams. Her interest in music began when she was four years old, and she enrolled in a music school in Burghausen, Germany.

She was introduced to music by Mohit Records manager Bullet and signed in January, 2018 after the untimely death of label mate Ebony Reigns.

On 1 June 2018, Shay released her debut single, "Uber Driver", produced by M.O.G Beatz. The song was released together with the official video the same day.

Shay was enstooled as the Ahenemba Hemaa of Gomoa Afransi in the Central Region with the stool name Queen Ewurabena Ofosuhemaa Shay 1.

== Brand ambassador ==
Shay is the brand ambassador for the Youth Employment Agency (YEA) in Ghana.

There was a controversy around Shay being sacked as the brand ambassador for the YEA, but it was later confirmed that she is still the ambassador.

== Performance ==
Shay has performed at several events including the Miss Ghana 2018 Finals, RTP Awards Africa 2018, and BF Suma Ghana Connect 18 concert.

Shay was named Discovery of the Year at the 2018 Vodafone Ghana Music Awards. She was nominated for several other prizes that year, including the three music prizes; she won Breakthrough of the Year, new artiste of the year at the Ghana Music Awards SA, Best New Artiste of the Year Ghana-Naija Showbiz Awards 2018, and Eastern Music Awards Video of the Year.

In December 2019, she performed at Ghana's Afronation Music Festival.

Her performance in Belgium at the Ghana Culture Festival 2022 was stopped by the police.

== Discography ==
=== Singles ===
- "Uber Driver"
- "Bedroom Commando"
- "Astalavista"
- "Psalm 35" (featuring Kuami Eugene, Sarkodie )
- "The Boy Is Mine" (featuring Eno Barony)
- "Masakra" (featuring Ray James)
- "All For You"
- "Shay On You"
- Stevie Wonder feat Shatta Wale
- All For You
- Kut It
- CTD
- Tuff Skin Girl
- Katiana (feat Razben)
- Heat
- Survivor
- Heaven
- New level (2022)
- Habibi (2023)
- Bleeding (2023)
- African Money (2023)
- Holy Father ft Ras Kuuku (2024)
- Who cares (2024)
- Vivian (2024)
- Too late (2024)
- Crazy Love (2025)

=== Albums ===
- Shay On You
- Enigma (2022)
- Shayning Star

== Awards and nominations ==
Year	Event	Prize	Recipient	Result	Ref
2018	Ghana-Naija Showbiz Awards	Best New Artiste of the Year	Herself	Won	
2018	Ghana Music Awards SA	New Artiste of the Year	Herself	Won	
2018	MuseAfrica's "Bangerz of the Quarter" Awards	Afrobeats Artiste of the Year	Herself	Nominated	
2018	MuseAfrica's "Bangerz of the Quarter" Awards	Afrobeats Song of the Quarter	Uber Driver	Nominated	
2018	MuseAfrica's "Bangerz of the Quarter" Awards	Introlude Song of the Quarter	Uber Driver	Nominated	
2018	Eastern Music Awards	Female Vocalist of the Year	Herself	Nominated	
2018	Eastern Music Awards	Artist of the Year	Herself	Nominated	
2018	Eastern Music Awards	Music Video of the Year	Uber Driver	Won	
2019	3Music Awards	Breakthrough Act of the Year	Herself	Won	
2019	Vodafone Ghana Music Awards	Discovery of the Year	Herself	Won	
2019	Ghana Music Awards UK	New Artiste of the Year	Herself	Won	
2021	Vodafone Ghana Music Awards	Afro-beats/Afro-pop Song of the Year	Herself	Nominated	
2021	Vodafone Ghana Music Awards	Afro-beat/Afro-pop Artiste of the Year	Herself	Nominated	
2022	3Music Awards	Woman of the Year	Herself	Nominated	
2022	3Music Awards	Viral Song of the Year	Heat	Nominated	
2022	3Music Awards	Afrobeats/AfroPop Act of the Year	Herself	Nominated	
2022	3Music Awards	Hip-Hop Song of the Year	Heat	Nominated	
