= Kofi Jamar =

Ghanaian musician and rapper (born 1995)

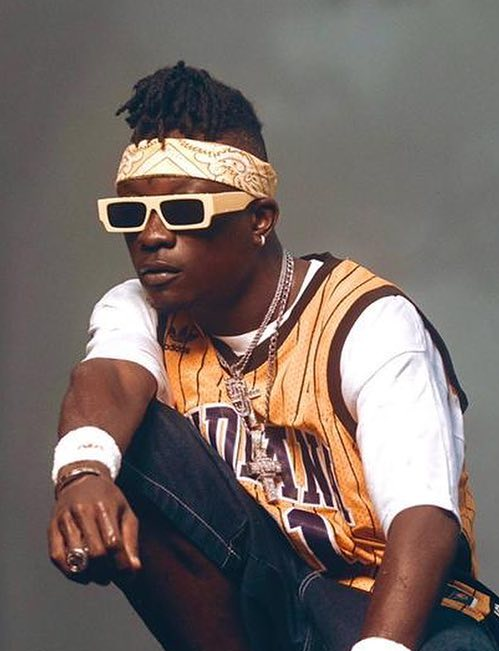

Background information
- Born: Derrick Osei Kuffour Prempeh; 7 April 1995 (age 30); Kumasi, Ghana
- Origin: Bantama
- Genres: Drill music, rap, hip pop
- Occupations: Musician, rapper
- Instrument: Vocals
- Years active: 2016–present
- Label: Gadone Records

Derrick Osei Kuffour Prempeh (born 1995) popularly called Kofi Jamar is a Ghanaian musician from Kumasi. He is best known for his hit song Ekorso which evolved from the viral Kumerica/Asaaka trend and features Yaw Tog and YPee. In 2021, he was in nomination in seven categories at the Vodafone Ghana Music Awards but won none.

== Early life and education ==
Jamar is from Bantama in the Ashanti Region of Ghana. He attended Bethel Preparatory School together with fellow rapper Amerado.

== Concerts ==
- He performed at the 17th Ghana Party in the Park UK Concert.
- He performed at the Ghana Music Awards UK in October 2021.
