= Mona 4Reall =

Ghanaian singer and songwriter

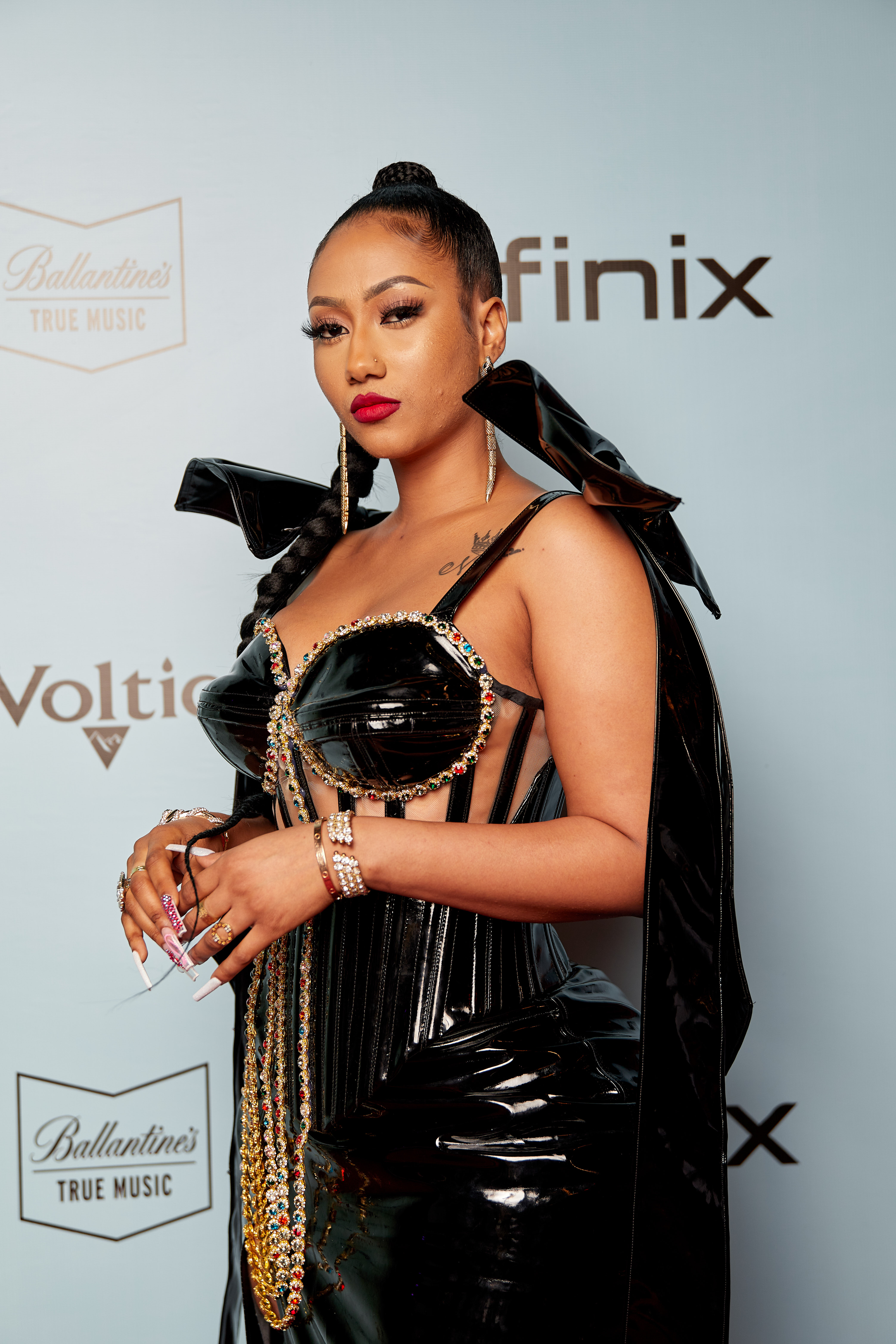
- Mona 4Reall portrait from 3Music Awards 2022

Background information
- Born: Mona Faiz Montrage; 26 June 1992 (age 34); Tamale, Ghana
- Genre: Hiplife
- Occupations: Musician, singer, songwriter
- Years active: 2020–present
- Label: 4Real Entertainment

Mona Faiz Montrage (born 26 June 1992), popularly known by her stage names as Mona 4Reall or Hajia4Reall is a Ghanaian socialite, model, musician, entrepreneur, and convicted fraudster..

== Early life and education ==
Hajia4Reall was born on 26 June 1992 in Tamale, northern Ghana where she grew up and spent her early life. She received her elementary education in Tamale and later continued to Labone Senior High School for her secondary school education.

== Career ==
=== Business ===
In July 2017, she established a women’s beauty brand known as 4Real Beauty. She is the owner of a New York–based event and entertainment company that focuses on event planning, multimedia production, and talent management. The company became prominent after organizing Accra’s Global Wave Party in 2016, one of the city’s biggest end-of-year events.

She has been featured in various music videos, including “Bullet Proof” by Shatta Wale.

=== Music ===
Mona 4Reall released "Badder Than", her first single in November 2020. The song was produced by Ghanaian producer M.O.G Beatz. In January 2021, she released her song single "Fine Girl", produced by Kuami Eugene. In May 2021, she released a third single produced by M.O.G. Beatz which featured Ghanaian YouTuber Kwadwo Sheldon. The following month, she released her fourth single titled "Baby", which featured dancehall musician Shata Wale.

On 6 October 2021, she announced the track-list for her then-upcoming EP. The seven–track EP featured top artists including Shatta Wale, Stonebwoy, Efya and Medikal with the tracks being produced either by M.O.G. Beatz, Richie Mensah, Mix Master Garzy and StreetBeatz. The EP was released on 15 October 2021, with six of their respective videos being premiered on her 4Real Entertainment YouTube channel.

In 2022, she was nominated for Best New Artiste of the Year award and her music video for her song Fine Girl was nominated for Best Music Video of the Year at the Vodafone Ghana Music Awards 2022. She released a dancehall single "BLOWbyMona", in 2022. She held her self-named concert in December 2021 which featured other known Ghanaian musicians.

== Personal life ==
Mona 4Reall was in a relationship with Ghanaian businessman, Kennedy Agyapong known as Kenpong. They parted ways in August 2015. She has a daughter named Naila.

In 2020, on her 27th birthday she was gifted a brand-new Range Rover and a house located in Trassacco, an estate community in Accra.

== Legal issues ==
In November 2022, Mona 4Reall was arrested in the United Kingdom for an alleged money laundering issue. The arrest stemmed from allegations of her purported involvement in a $8 million fraud.

In February 2024, she pleaded guilty to one count of conspiring to receive stolen money. According to United States Attorney for the Southern District of New York, Damian Williams, she knowingly received money from older Americans through romance scams. The charges carry a maximum sentence of five years in prison. Hajia4Reall also agreed to pay forfeiture for $2,164,758.41 and make restitution in the same amount. On June 28, 2024, she was sentenced to 12 months and one day in prison followed by three years of supervised release.

== Discography ==
=== Albums and mixtapes ===
- Here To Stay (EP) (2021)

=== Singles ===
- "Badder Than" (2020)
- "Fine Girl" (2021)
- "God's Child" (2021)
- "Baby" ft. Shatta Wale (2021)

== Awards and nominations ==
Year	Ceremony	Award	Nominated work	Result	Ref
2022	Vodafone Ghana Music Awards	Best New Artiste	Herself	Nominated	
2022	Vodafone Ghana Music Awards	Video of The Year	Fine Girl	Nominated	
2022	3Music Awards	Emerging Woman of the Year	Herself	Won	
2022	3Music Awards	Woman of the Year	Herself	Nominated	
2022	3Music Awards	Breakthrough Act of the Year	Herself	Nominated	
2022	Ghana Entertainment Awards	Discovery of the Year	Herself	Nominated	
2022	Ghana Entertainment Awards	Best Female Act of the Year	Herself	Nominated	
