= Ohemaa Mercy =

Ghanaian gospel artiste

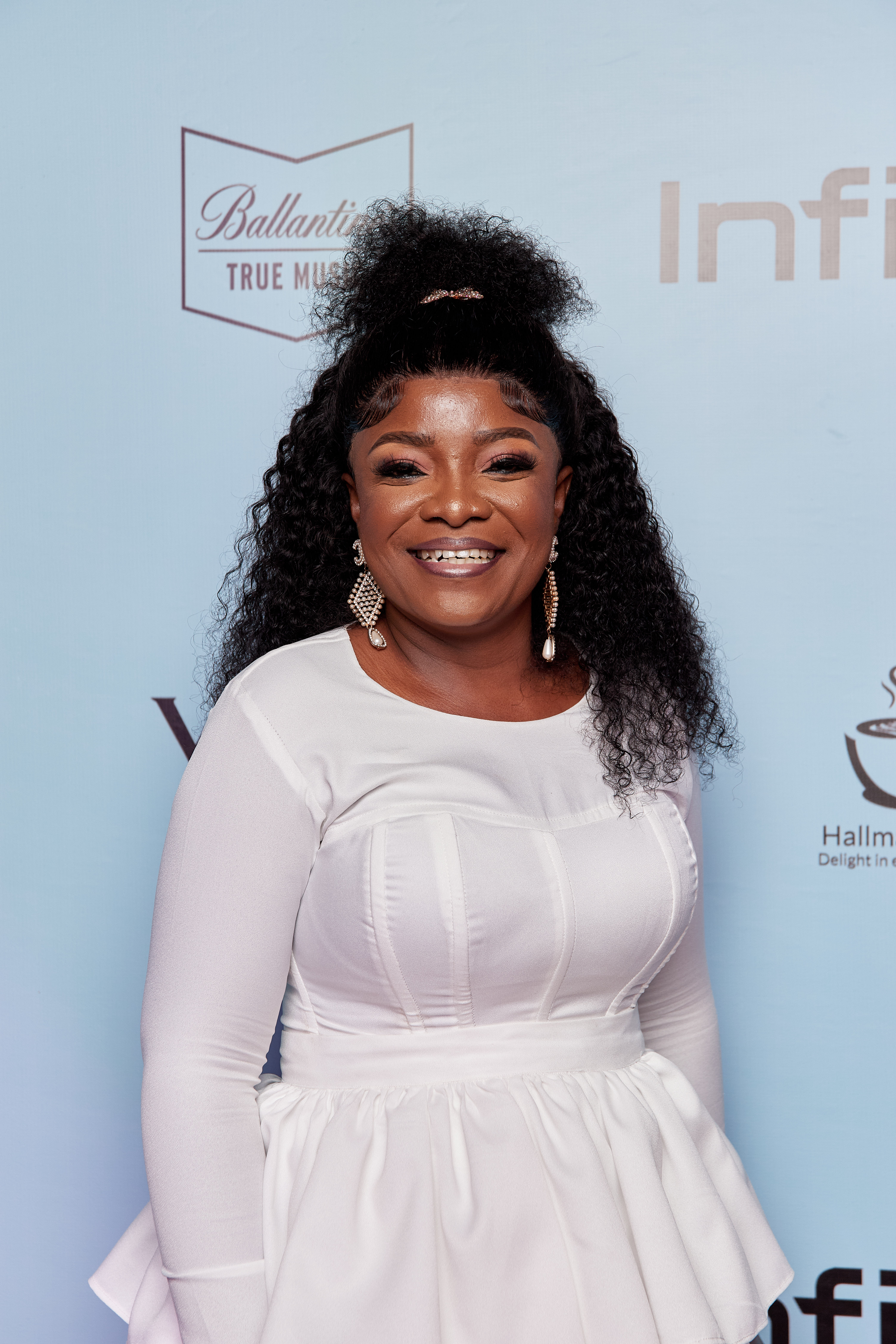
- Ohemaa Mercy

Background information
- Also known as: Ohemaa Mercy
- Born: Mercy Amoah; 7 September 1977 (age 48); Accra, Ghana
- Genres: Gospel
- Years active: (2004–present)
- Label: Royalty Music Company ltd

Ohemaa Mercy is a Ghanaian contemporary gospel singer with several awards to her name.

== Early life and education ==
Mercy Amoah popularly known as Ohemaa Mercy was born in Weija, Accra to Fantis parents, Mr and Mrs Amoah, from Abakrapa and Elmina respectively. She lived most of her young life in Koforidua. Ohemaa Mercy undertook her primary education at St. Peter's Anglican Primary School, Koforidua and secondary education at Ghana Senior High School, Koforidua. She continued to the S.D.A Teachers Training College, Asokore, Koforidua where she obtained her Teachers Certificate ‘A'.

== Music career ==
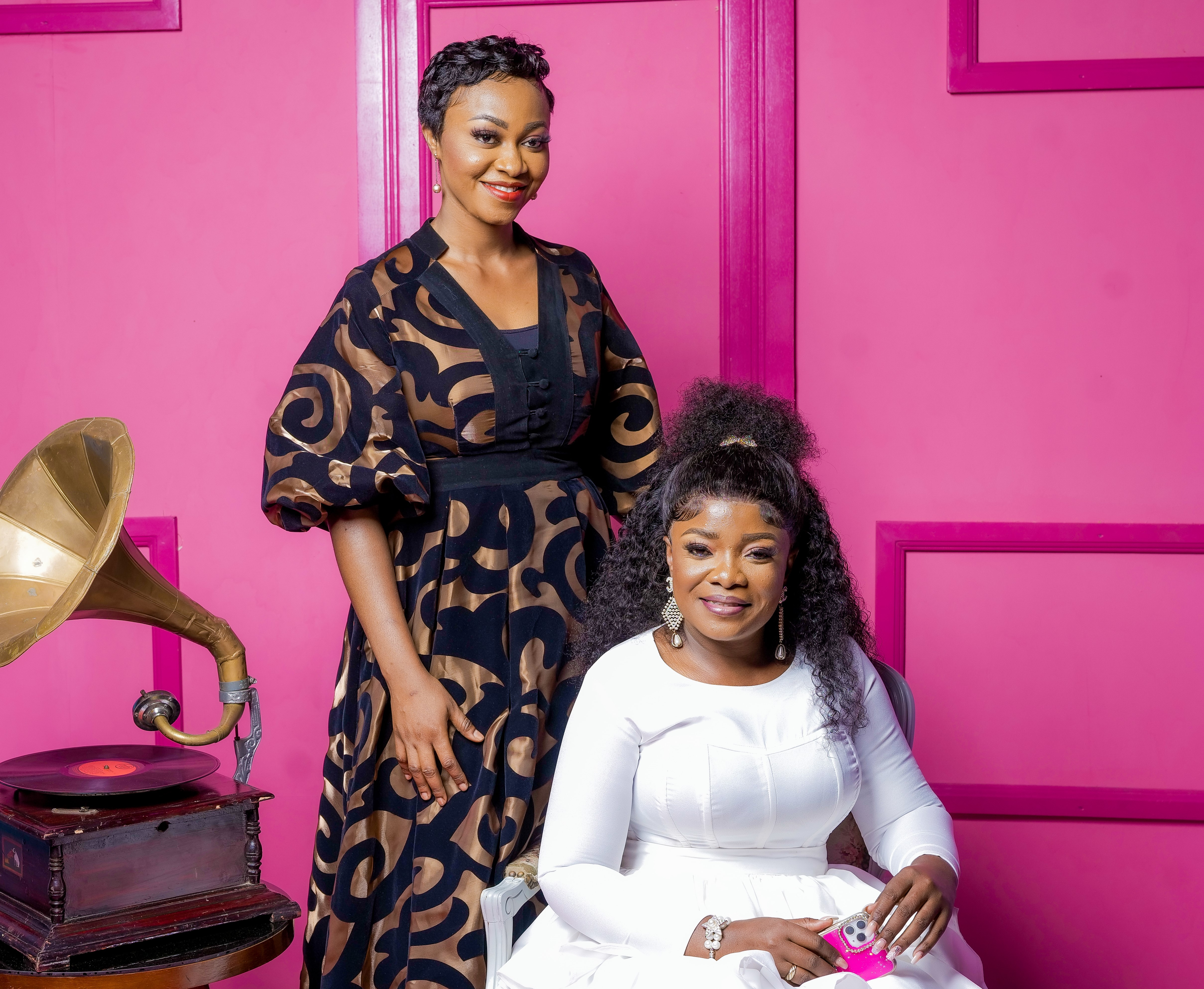
Ohemaa Mercy and Efe Grace at 3 Music Awards

Ohemaa Mercy released her first album in the latter part of November 2004. Entitled Adamfo Papa, the album enjoyed massive airplay after its release, which brought Ohemaa into the limelight. She won seven nominations for the 2006 Ghana Music Awards but did not win any of the awards. She later won the Discovery of the year for the Gospel Music Awards the same year.

In 2007, the gospel minister released her second album, Edin Jesus. Ohemaa Mercy sold 875,000 copies six months after releasing the second album making it the best-selling album of the year.

The Edin Jesus album gave Ohemaa Mercy 10 nominations for the 2008 Ghana Music Awards. This was the highest number of nominations so far in the history of the awards scheme. At the event she managed to take home three awards: Gospel Artiste of the Year, Album of the Year and Gospel Album of The Year. In the same year she won a Grand Medal During the National Honours Award from the ex-President of Ghana, John Kufuor.

In 2010–11 Ohemaa released her third album, Wobeye Kese, which again was the highest selling album and topped all the major chat shows in the country.

Four months after its release this album again won her four nominations at the 2014 Ghana Music Awards.

In the same year, she won the Gospel Artiste of the year domestically and Gospel Artiste of the Year in Canada. She also received a nomination for Best Female Artiste West Africa for the Africa Gospel Music awards in London. Additionally, her song "Ote Me Mu" featuring MOG music won Gospel Song Of The Year at the 2023 Vodafone Ghana Music Awards. Ohemaa Mercy has performed on major platforms, developing a large fan base through her music and stage presence.

== Studio albums ==
Title	Album details	Ref
Adamfo Papa (Good Friend)	Release year: 2004	
Edin Jesus (The Name Jesus)	Release year: 2007	
Wobɛyɛ Kɛse (You will be Great)	Release year: 2009	
Prophecy	Release year: 2012	
His Word	Release year: 2013 / 2014	
Afɔrebɔ (Offering)	Release year: 2015 / 2016	

== Major singles ==
- "Aseda" (Thanksgiving)
- "We Praise Your Name"
- "Yesu Mogya" (The Blood of Jesus)
- "Woafiri Mu"(You Have Escaped It)
- "Ɔbɛyɛ Ama Wo"(He Will Do It For You)
- "Biribi Bɛsi"(Something Will Happen)
- "Ote Me Mu" ft. MOG Music

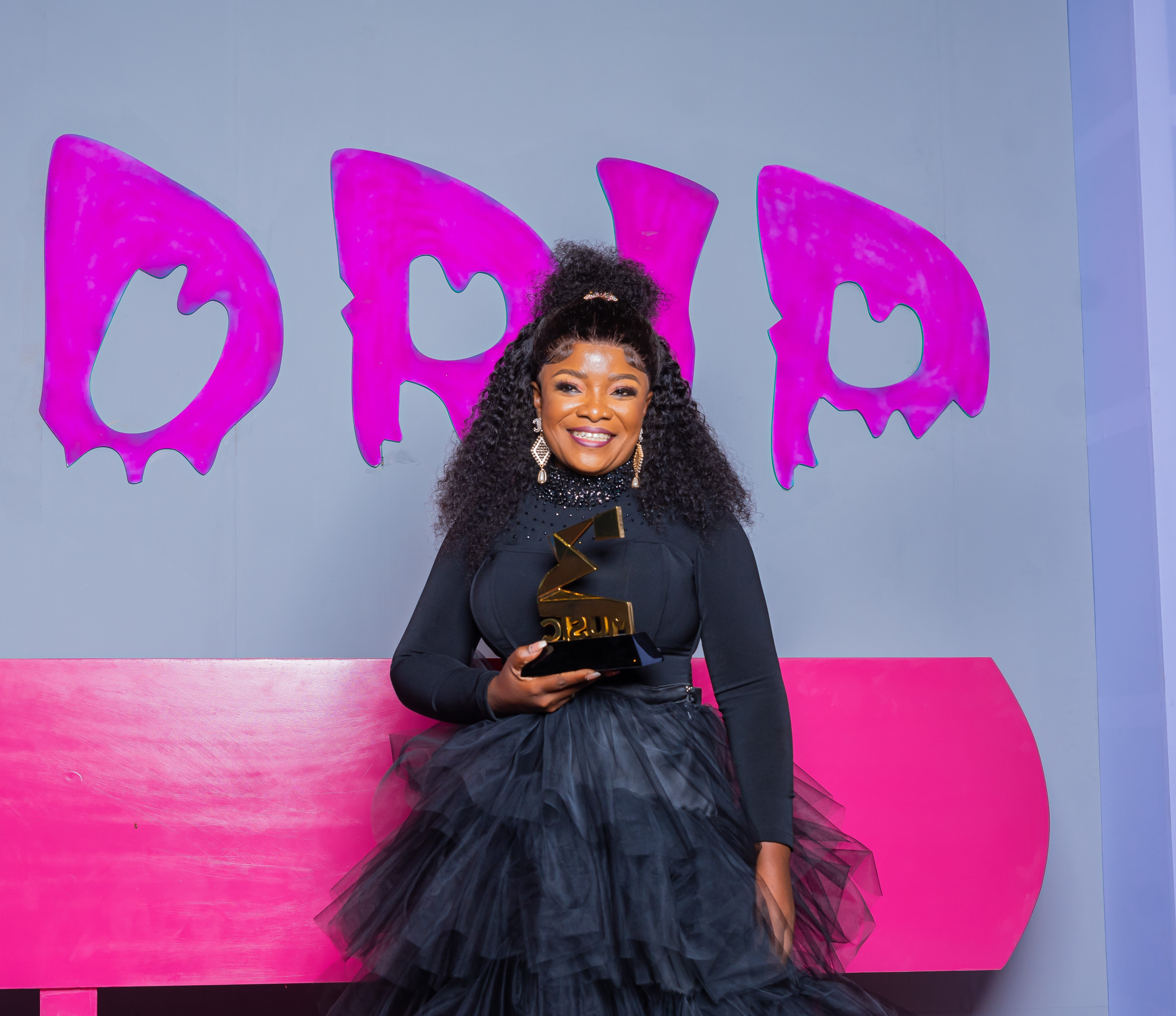
Ohemaa Mercy posing with her award on the 3Music Awards 2022 drip carpet

== Awards and nominations ==
Year	Award	Category	Nominated work	Result	Ref
2022	3Music Awards	Gospel Song of the Year	He Lives In Me (Ote Me Mu) ft. MOG Music	Won	
2022	3Music Awards	Gospel Act of the Year	Herself	Nominated	
2022	3Music Awards	Performer of the Year	Tehillah	Nominated	
2022	3Music Awards	Woman of the Year	Herself	Nominated	
2022	VGMA	Best Gospel Song of the Year	Ote Me Mu - Ohemaa Mercy ft MOGMusic	Won	
