= S3fa =

Ghanaian singer and songwriter

- Born: Sefadzi Abena Amesu; 17 May 1995 (age 31); Accra, Ghana
- Genres: Afrobeats, Afro-pop
- Occupations: Musician, singer, songwriters
- Years active: 2017–present
- Label: Black Avenue Muzik

Sefadzi Abena Amesu (born 17 May 1995) better known by her stage name S3fa is a Ghanaian singer and songwriter. She is an afro-pop and afrobeats musician. S3fa won the Afrobeats Song of the year award during the 2022 Vodafone Ghana Music Awards with her song titled, E Choke.

== Early life and education ==
S3fa comes from Akoefe a town in Volta Region, Ghana. Her father is an Ewe and comes from Akoefe whilst her mother is a Dagara who comes from Upper East Region. She is the second born of four siblings. S3fa attended Ola Girls Senior High School in Ho, Volta Region in 2014, before proceeding to Accra Technical University, where she graduated with a Diploma in purchasing and supply in 2017.

== Music career ==
S3fa started as a singer performing with live bands at bars, pubs and events in Accra. In 2017, she was signed by Black Avenue Muzik after D-Black, the Chief Executive of the record label reached out to her via social media platform Instagram. She released her debut single Marry me featuring Jupiter.

In May 2018, she released her second single titled Shuga featuring musical duo DopeNation in May 2018. In November 2020, she released her debut album Growth. The album was a twelve–tracked album which featured EL, Camidoh, Fameye, Sista Afia, Wendy Shay, Bisa Kdei, Medikal and Nigerian singer Praiz.

On 16 April 2021, she released a single titled E Choke, featuring Mr Drew. The song became popular due also due to its choreographed dance music video which became a trend and music challenge on TikTok and Instagram.

With her song E Choke, she won the Afrobeats song of the year award during the 2022 Vodafone Ghana Music Awards which fell coincidentally on her birthday.

In October 2024, she announced she has left the Black Avenue Muzik label, owned by D-Black.

== Discography ==
=== Albums and mixtapes ===
- Growth (2020)

=== Selected singles ===
- Marry me ft. Jupiter (2017)
- Shuga (2018)
- Echoke ft. Mr Drew (2021)
- Fever ft. Sarkodie & DJ Tira (2021)
- Soft life (2022)
- All Over feat Camidoh (2024)

== Awards and nominations ==
Year	Ceremony	Award	Nominated work	Result	Ref
2020	3Music Awards	Breakthrough Act of the Year	Herself	Nominated	
2022	3Music Awards	Afrobeats/Afropop Song of the Year	Echoke ft. Mr Drew	Nominated	
2022	3Music Awards	Afrobeats/ Afropop Artist of the Year	Herself	Nominated	
2022	3Music Awards	Best Collaboration of the Year	Echoke ft. Mr Drew	Nominated	
2022	3Music Awards	Digital Act of the Year	Herself	Nominated	
2022	3Music Awards	Song of the Year	Echoke ft. Mr Drew	Nominated	
2022	3Music Awards	Viral Song of the Year	Echoke ft. Mr Drew	Nominated	
2022	3Music Awards	Woman of the Year	Herself	Nominated	
2022	Vodafone Ghana Music Awards	Best Afrobeat Song	Echoke ft. Mr Drew	Won	
2022	Vodafone Ghana Music Awards	Collaboration of the Year	Echoke ft. Mr Drew	Nominated	
2022	Vodafone Ghana Music Awards	Afrobeats/Afropop Artiste	Herself	Nominated	
2022	Vodafone Ghana Music Awards	Best New Artiste	Herself	Nominated	
2022	Vodafone Ghana Music Awards	Vodafone Most Popular Song	Echoke ft. Mr Drew	Nominated	
2023	Basadi in Music Awards	Mosadi In Music In Africa Award	Herself	Won	
2024	Basadi in Music Awards	Dance Artist of the Year	"Vibration"	Nominated	
2024	Ghana Music Awards UK	Best Collaboration of the Year	"Vibration"	Pending	
