= D-Black =

Ghanaian hip-hop musician (born 1987)

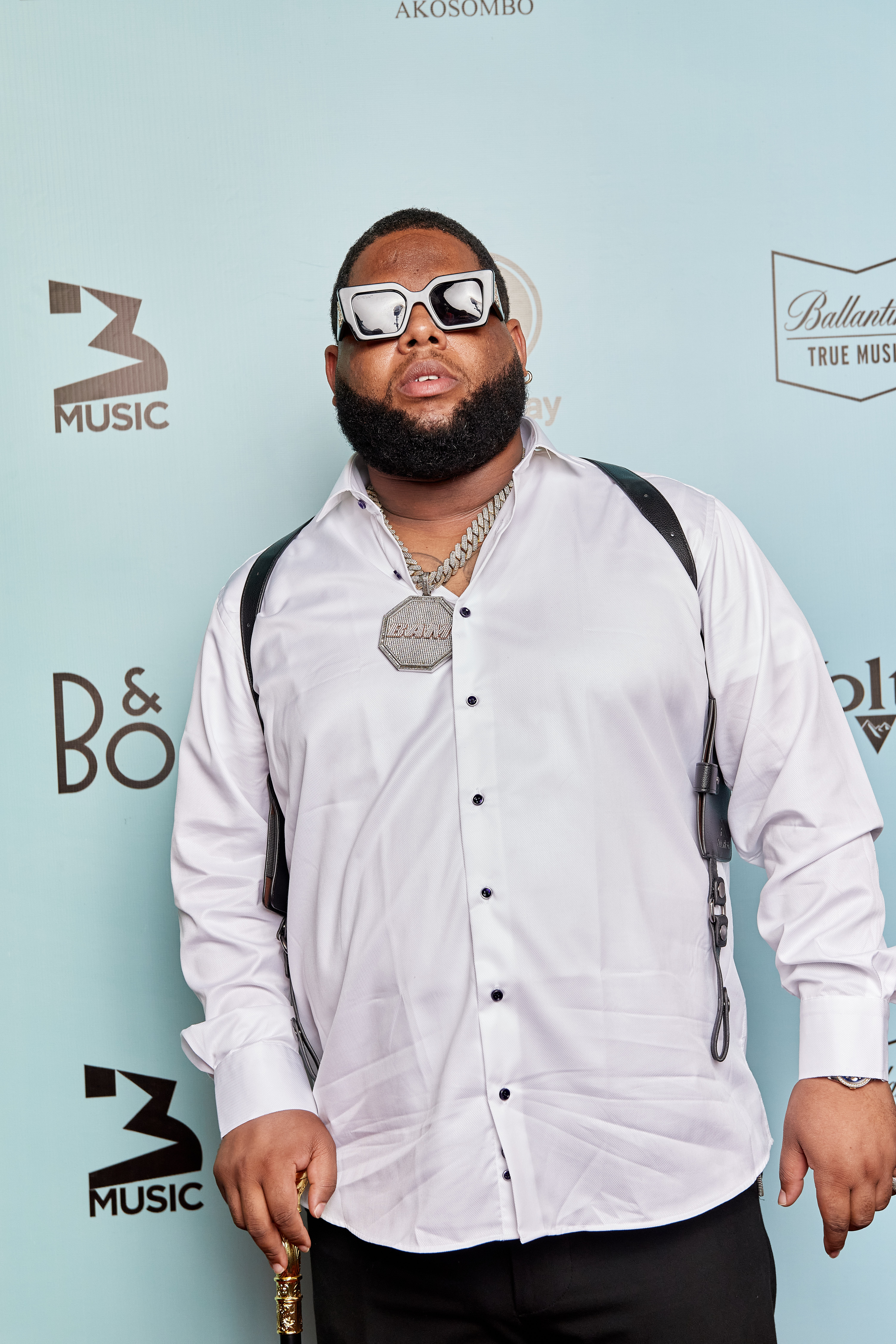

Background information
- Also known as: Da Ghana Bwouy
- Born: Desmond Kwesi Blackmore; 12 January 1987 (age 39); Accra, Ghana
- Genres: Hiplife; hip hop; Afrobeats
- Occupations: Rapper; songwriter; record producer; entrepreneur
- Instrument: Vocals
- Years active: 2009–present
- Label: Black Avenue Muzik

Desmond Kwesi Blackmore (born 12 January 1987), known by his stage name D-Black, is an anglophone hip-hop and Afrobeat musician and entrepreneur from Ghana. He has been described as "a successful entertainment mogul"

== Early life ==
D-Black attended Ridge Church School then Pope John Senior High School and Minor Seminary before the University of Cape Coast to study B.A Economics and University Of Ghana, Legon to study BFA Theatre Arts/Music.

== Personal life ==
D-Black was born to a Ghanaian mother, Adeline Boateng, and a Ghanaian-English father, John Derek Blackmore. He has three children. D-Black has nine siblings.

== Career ==
In 2009, D-Black began his career as an independent artist in the group D-Black & Kwaku T, releasing a group album, Target Practice. In 2010 D-Black and his rap partner both went solo. He went on to release three albums (Music, Love and Life, The Revelation and Lightwork), an E.P (Smoke and Mirrors) and a mix-tape (Hunger & Thirst). He won the 2011 BET Awards.

D-Black has worked with Nigerian artists Davido and Phyno, South African artists Cassper Nyovest and Bucie, and East African artists Vanessa Mdee. In Ghana, he has frequently partnered with Sarkodie, StoneBwoy, and Efya.

D-Black represents Ciroc Ultra Premium Vodka as its brand ambassador in Ghana. Additionally, he secured a marketing partnership with Black Sun Energy Drink. He fronts his own Black Avenue Clothing Line. He was the brand ambassador for The Rlg Brand of VIVA phones in the West African Sub Region in 2013.

== Black Avenue Muzik ==
D-Black is the CEO of record label Black Avenue Muzik, with acts including himself, DJ Breezy, S3fa, and music producers Rony Turn Me Up and Paul Noun. Former acts include Joey B, Freda Rhymz, Dahlin Gage, Ms. Forson, Osayo & Nina Ricchie & Wisa Greid. It won record label of the year at the 2018 Ghana - Naija Entertainment Awards in Lagos, Nigeria. and was nominated for the record label of the year at the 2019 Ghana Entertainment Awards in New York.

== Other ventures ==
=== Black Avenue Clothing ===
Set up in 2012, this is a design company, marketer and importer of men and women's apparel.

=== Livewire Events ===
Livewire Events is an events management company set up in 2015. In 2015 it produced the Bukom Banku vs Ayittey Powers boxing match at the Kumasi Sports Stadium. This included performances from Sarkodie, Shatta Wale and Efya. Other events include the 2018 Kundum Festival Jam in Axim for the Ministry of Tourism.

=== Black Avenue Films/TV ===
He produced the film Why Should I Get Married, starring John Dumelo, Maria Nepembe, Princess Shyngle, Eya, Prince David Osei, and The EFGH Show hosted by Peace Hyde in 2015.

=== Hospitality ===
D-Black owns Club Onyx, Oasis Lounge and La Maison restaurant..

== Discography ==
=== Albums ===
- Target Practice (2009)
- Music, Love & Life (2010)
- The Revelation (2012)
- Lightwork (2016)
- Hunger & Thirst Mixtape (2017)
- Smoke & Mirrors E.P (2019)

=== Singles ===
- "Move" w/ Kwaku T (2009)
- Breathe" w/ Kwaku T (2010)
- "Somebody" ft. Kwabena Kwabena (2011)
- "Get On the Dancefloor" ft. D Cryme (2011)
- "Ma Me Five" (2011)
- "Asabone" ft. Reggie Rockstone (2011)
- "My Kinda Girl" ft. Sarkodie (2012)
- "Change Your Life" ft. E.L (2012)
- "Vera" ft. Joey B (2012)
- "Black Clouds' ft. Waje (2013)
- "Conference Call" ft. Kwaw Kese, Sarkodie (2013)
- "Woara" ft. Kesse (2013)
- "Setewaa D3nky3" (2013)
- "Party Gbee" (2013)
- "Carry Go" ft. Davido (2013)
- "Personal Person" ft. Castro (2014)
- "Seihor" w/ Castro (2014)
- "Kotomoshi (2015)
- "Champ" ft. M.I Abaga (2016)
- "Omega" ft. Sarkodie (2016)
- "Bottles" ft. Medikal (2017)
- "Julie" ft. Bisa KDei (2017)
- "Makoma" ft. Mayorkun (2017)
- "Nobody" ft. King Promise (2018)
- "Badder" ft. Kuami Eugene(2019)
- "Dat Ting" ft. Joey B (2019)
- "Obiba" ft. Kidi (2019)
- "Miracle" (2019)
- "Falaa" ft. Medikal (2019)
- "Heaven Or Hell" ft. Sefa (2019)
- "Stay" ft. Simi (2019)
- "Sheege" ft. Gyakie (2021)

== Awards and nominations ==
Year	Event	Award	Song	Results
2009	Channel O Music Video Awards	Best West African	Move	Nominated
2010	Vodafone Ghana Music Awards	Hip-Hop / Hip-life Song of the Year	Breathe	Nominated
2010	Vodafone Ghana Music Awards	Music Video of the Year	Breathe	Won
2010	Museke African Music Awards	Music Video of the Year	Breathe	Nominated
2010	African Music Awards, London	Music Video of the Year	Breathe	Won
2010	Channel O Music Video Awards, South Africa	Best Hip-hop	Breathe	Nominated
2010	Channel O Music Video Awards, South Africa	Best Music Video	Breathe	Nominated
2010	Sound City Music Awards, Nigeria	Best Collaboration	Somebody	Nominated
2010	Sound City Music Awards, Nigeria	Best New Video	Believe	Nominated
2010	4SYTE Music Video Awards	Best Overall Video	Breathe	Nominated
2010	4SYTE Music Video Awards	Best Storyline in a Video	Breathe	Won
2010	4SYTE Music Video Awards	Best Directed Video	Breathe	Nominated
2010	4SYTE Music Video Awards	Best Collaboration in a Video	Breathe	Won
2010	4SYTE Music Video Awards	Best Group Video	Breathe	Nominated
2011	Ghana Music Awards	Hip hop/ Hip-life Artist of the Year	None	Nominated
2011	Ghana Music Awards	Hip hop Song of the Year	Get on Da Dancefloor	Won
2011	Ghana Music Awards	Songwriter of the Year	Somebody	Nominated
2011	Ghana Music Awards	Collaboration of the Year	Somebody	Nominated
2011	Ghana Music Awards	Album of the Year	Music, Love & Life	Nominated
2011	BET Awards	Best International Artist of the Year (Africa)	-	Nominated
2011	Ghana Gospel Industry Awards	Alternate Gospel Song of the year	Somebody	Nominated
2011	Ghana Gospel Industry Awards	Alternate Gospel Video of the year	Somebody	Won
2011	Channel O Music Video Awards	Best African West	Get on Da Dancefloor	Nominated
2011	4Syte Music Video Awards	Best Photography in a video	Somebody	Nominated
2011	4Syte Music Video Awards	Best Hip-hop Video	Get on da dancefloor	Nominated
2011	4Syte Music Video Awards	Best Collaboration in a video	Somebody	Nominated
2011	4Syte Music Video Awards	Best Edited Video	Get on Da Dancefloor	Nominated
2011	Music Video Awards	Best African Act	Get on Da Dancefloor	Nominated
2011	Ghana Hip-hop Awards	The Next Big Thing Award	-	Won
2011	Ghana Hip-hop Awards	Male Hip-hop Artiste(of the Decade)	-	
2011	Ghana Hip-hop Awards	Hip-hop album (of the Decade)	-	Nominated
2011	Ghana Hip-hop Awards	Best Collaboration	Breathe	Nominated
2011	Ghana Hip-hop Awards	Hip-hop Artiste of the year	-	Won
2012	Ghana Music Awards	Hip-hop Song of the year	My Kinda Girl	Nominated
2012	Ghana Music Awards	Music Video of the year	My Kinda Girl	Nominated
2012	Ghana Music Awards	Album of the Year	The Revelation	Nominated
2012	HSH Awards	Most Influential Artiste	-	Won
2012	Hip-hop World Awards	Best International Artiste	-	Nominated
2012	Channel O Music Video Awards	Best West Africa video	Falling	Won
2012	MTN 4SYTE Music Video Awards	Best Collaboration	Falling	Won
2013	Ghana Music Awards	Artist of the year	-	Nominated
2013	Ghana Music Awards	Song of the Year	Vera	Nominated
2013	Ghana Music Awards	Hip-life Song of the Year	Vera	Nominated
2013	Ghana Music Awards	Hip-hop Song of the Year	Falling	Nominated
2013	Ghana Music Awards	Hip-hop/Hip-life Artiste of the Year	-	Nominated
2013	Ghana Music Awards UK	Song of the year	Vera	Won
2013	Ghana Music Awards UK	Collaboration of the year	Vera	Won
2013	Channel O Music Video Awards	Best Africa West	Vera	Nominated
2015	Ghana Music Awards	Hip-life Song of the Year	Seihor	Won
2016	4Syte Music Video Awards	Male Video of the Year	Kotomoshi	Won
2016	4Syte Music Video Awards	Hiplife Video of the Year	Kotomoshi	Nominated
2016	4Syte Music Video Awards	Best Directed Video of the Year	Kotomoshi	Nominated
2016	4Syte Music Video Awards	Most Influential Artist of the Year	D-Black	Nominated
2017	Ghana Movie Awards	Soundtrack the Year	D-Black ft. Efya	Won
2017	4Syte Music Video Awards	Hiplife Video of the Year	Bottles	Won
2017	4Syte Music Video Awards	Male Video of the Year	Bottles	Nominated
2017	4Syte Music Video Awards	Photography Video of the Year	Bottles	Nominated
2018	40 Under 40 Awards	Entrepreneur the Year (Hospitality)	D-Black (Club Onyx)	Won
2019	Ghana Entertainment Awards Awards	Artist / Entrepreneur of the Year	D-Black	Won
2022	3Music Awards	Artist of the Year	Himself	Nominated
2022	3Music Awards	Afrobeats/Afropop Song of the Year	Enjoyment Minister ft. Quamina MP, Stonebwoy	Nominated
2022	3Music Awards	Hiplife/Hip Hop Act of the Year	Himself	Nominated
2022	3Music Awards	Album of the Year	Loyalty	Nominated
