= 3Music Awards =

Annual award event in Ghana

3 Music Awards
- Current: 3Music Awards 2022
- Country: Ghana
- Presented by: 3 Music Network
- First award: 2018

Television/radio coverage
- Network: Multimedia Group Limited

The 3 Music Award is Ghanaian music awards ceremony held annually since 2018 to celebrate Ghanaian music. It was established by the 3Music Network with Media General TV3 as broadcasters. The Multimedia group became the media right holder in the second and subsequent edition. In 2020, the Fan fest which was scheduled to take place at the Accra Polo Grounds was cancelled and a Virtual award ceremony was held from the Fantasy Dome, Trade Fair La. This was because of the ban on public gathering due to the COVID-19 pandemic.

== Categories ==
- Artiste of the Year
- Song of the Year
- Male Act of the Year
- Female Act of the Year
- Group of the Year
- Breakout Act of the Year
- Album of the Year
- Viral Song of the Year
- Music video of the Year
- Reggae/Dancehall Act of the Year
- Hiplife/Hop-Pop Act of the Year
- Hilife Act of the Year
- Gospel Act of the Year
- Best Collaboration of the Year
- Best KwitStar
- DJ of the Year
- Fan Army of the Year
- African Act of the Year
- Best Ghanaian International Act of the Year
- Most Eventful Snapchat Channel
- Facebook Star of the Year
- Instagram Star of the Year
- Best Performers of the Year
- AfroBeat/AfroPop Song of the Year
- Producer of the Year

Not all categories were used in each year and some categories have been merged.

=== Song of the Year ===
The Song of the year was the topmost award of the awards scheme from 2018 to 2020. It recognizes the vocal performer, the songwriter, producer, sound engineer and or mixer of the song. It is voted for by the 3Music board, academy and the general public.

==== Song of the Year Winners ====
List of Winners
Year	Song	Vocal performer	Song Writer	Producer	Sound Engineer/Mixer
2018	Ayoo	Shatta Wale	Shatta Wale	Posigee	Posigee/Damaker
2019	My Level	Shatta Wale	Shatta Wale	Paq	Paq/Damaker
2020	Things Fall Apart	Kofi kinaata	Kofi Kinaata	Two Bars	Two Bars
2021	Enjoyment	KiDi	KiDi	M.O.G Beatz	M.O.G Beatz

In 2021, the Artiste of the Year category was added eclipsing the song of the year as the topmost award of the awards scheme. KiDi was the inaugural winner.

== Ceremonies ==
The awards were launched in

The inaugural ceremony in 2018 was held at the Fantasy Dome, Trade fair Site, La. From 2018 to 2020, the Fantasy Dome, Trade fair Site, La hosted the awards. From 2021 to 2022, the ceremonies were held at the Grand Arena, Accra International Conference Center in Accra.

=== 2018: 1st 3Music Awards ===
The first ceremony was held at the Fantasy Dome, Trade fair Site, La, on 24 March 2018. The ceremony was hosted Joselyn Dumas and D-Black.

List of Winners
Year	Categories	Winners
2018	Song Of the Year	Ayoo/Shatta Wale
2018	Male Act of the Year	Shatta Wale
2018	Facebook Star of the Year	Shatta Wale
2018	Best Ghanaian International Act of the Year	Stormzy (UK)
2018	African Act of the Year	Davido (Nigeria)
2018	DJ of the Year	DJ Mc Smith
2018	Fan Army of the Year	Shatta Movement
2018	Best Twitstar	Stonebwoy
2018	Reggae/Dancehall Act of the Year	Stonebwoy
2018	Instagram star of the Year	Stonebwoy
2018	Hip-life/Hip-pop Act of the Year	Sarkodie
2018	Music video of the Year	Overdose/Sakodie
2018	Album of the Year	Highest/Sarkodie
2018	Best Collaboration of the Year	Total Cheat/ Fancy Gadam/Sarkodie
2018	Female Act of the Year	Ebony Reigns
2018	Group of the Year	Gallaxy
2018	Viral Song of the Year	One Corner /patapaa
2018	Breakout Act of the Year	Maccassio
2018	Gospel Act of the Year	Joe Mettle
2018	Most Eventful Snap-chat Channel	Becca
2018	HighLife Act of the Year	Kumi Guitar

=== 2019: 2nd 3 Music Awards ===
The second annual 3 Music awards was hosted by Lexis Bill and Cookie. The event was held on 30 March 2019 at the Fantasy Dome, Trade fair Site, La.

List Of Winners
Year	Categories	Winner
2019	Song of the Year	My Level/ Shatta Wale
2019	Viral Song of the Year	Gringo / Shatta Wale
2019	Video of the Year	Gringo / Shatta Wale
2019	Reggae/DanceHall Song of the Year	Gringo / Shatta Wale
2019	Reggae/DanceHall Act of the Year	Shatta Wale
2019	Digital Act of the Year	Shatta Wale
2019	Fan Army of the Year	Shatta Movement Empire
2019	Album of the Year	Epistles of Mama/Stonebwoy
2019	Afrobeat Song of the Year	Bawasaba/Stonebwoy
2019	Most Streamed Artist on Boomplay	Stonebwoy
2019	Hip Life Song of the Year	CCTV/ King Promise
2019	High Life Act of the Year	Kuami Eugene
2019	High life Song of the Year	Wish Me well/Kuami Eugene
2019	Gospel Song of the Year	Agbadzi Gospel Medley/Bethel Revival Choir
2019	Gospel Act of the Year	Bethel Revival Choir
2019	Best of the Group of the Year	Bethel Revival Choir
2019	Legendary Award	Mark Okraku-Mantey
2019	Legendary Award	Professor Kofi Abraham
2019	Legendary Award	Obuoba J. A. Adofo
2019	Female Act of the Year	Adina
2019	Best Ghanaian International Act	Rocky Dawuni
2019	African Act of the Year	Victor AD
2019	Producer of the Year	MOG Beatz
2019	Collaboration of the Year	Grind Day Remix/Kwesi Arthur/Sarkodie/Medikal
2019	Next Rated Act of the Year	Kofi Mole
2019	Breakthrough Act of the Year	Wendy Shay
2019	Hip Pop Song of the Year	Stables/Joey B

=== 2020: 3rd 3 Music Awards ===
The 3rd annual 3 Music Awards dubbed the "StayAtHome" edition was held on 2 May 2020 at the Fantasy Dome, Trade Fair site La. The event hosted by Jay Foley and Naa Ashorkor had no audience in attendance, this was in compliance with the National Directives on Public Gathering due to the COVID-19 pandemic.

List of Winners
Year	Categories	Winner
2020	Song of the Year	Things Fall Apart/ Kofi Kinaata
2020	Best Rap Performer	Sarkodie
2020	Hip Life/Hip Pop Act of the Year	Sarkodie
2020	Male Act of the Year	Sarkodie
2020	Best collaboration of the Year	Saara/ Sarkodie/ Efya
2020	Fan Army of the Year	Sark Nation
2020	Female Act of the Year	Diana Hamilton
2020	High Life song of the Year	Things Fall Apart / Kofi Kinaata
2020	High Life Act of the Year	Kuami Eugene
2020	Hip Life song of the Year	Amanfuor Girls/Quamina MP
2020	Viral Song of The Year	Daavi ne ba / Kawula Biov / Patapaa
2020	Gospel song of the Year	Agbebolo / Celestine Donkor
2020	Gospel Act of the Year	Diana Hamilton
2020	Group of the Year	Dope Nation
2020	Reggae / Dancehall song of the Year	Poverty / J. Derobie
2020	Hip-Pop Song of the Year	Don't be late / Kofi Mole
2020	Producer of the Year	MOG Beatz
2020	Best Male Vocal Performance	KiDi
2020	Best Female Vocal Performance	Efya
2020	Afrobeats/Afropop Song of the Year	Mea / Kelvyn Boy
2020	Digital Act of the Year	Shatta Wale
2020	African Act of the Year	Teni
2020	Breakthrough Act of the Year	Fameye
2020	Next Rated Act	Saareiba
2020	DJ of the Year	DJ Vyrusky
2020	Outstanding Achievement Awards	Reggie Rockstone
2020	Outstanding Achievement Awards	Ewurama Badu
2020	Outstanding Achievement Awards	Dennis Tawiah
2020	Life Performer of the Year	Samini
2020	Album of the Year	Made in Ghana / Okyeame Kwame
2020	Music Video of the Year	Amaarae

=== 2021: 4th 3 Music Awards ===
The fourth annual 3 Music Award show was held on 27 March 2021 at the Accra International Conference Center. The event was hosted by broadcasters Jay Foley and Naa Ashorkor.

List of Winners

Year	Categories	Winner
2021	Artist (MVP) of the Year	KiDi
2021	EP of the Year	Blue / KiDi
2021	Song of the Year	Enjoyment / KiDi
2021	Hip Life/Hip Pop Act of the Year	Medikal
2021	Best collaboration of the Year	No Dulling / Keche / Kuami Eugene
2021	Fan Army of the Year	Kumericans
2021	Female Act of the Year	Diana Hamilton
2021	Rapper of the Year	Eno Barony
2021	High Life song of the Year	Sobolo / Stonebwoy
2021	High Life Act of the Year	Kuami Eugene
2021	Hip Life song of the Year	Bumper / Sarkodie
2021	Viral Song of The Year	Putuu Freestyle (Prayer) / Stonebwoy
2021	Most Streamed Song of the Year	Y'abr3 / Kofi Mole
2021	Most Streamed Act of the Year	Medikal
2021	Best Alternative Song of the Year	Comot / Worlasi
2021	Gospel song of the Year	Adom (Grace) / Diana Hamilton
2021	Gospel Act of the Year	Diana Hamilton
2021	Group of the Year	Dead Peepol
2021	Reggae / Dancehall song of the Year	Why / Adina Thembi
2021	Reggae / Dancehall act of the Year	Larusso
2021	Hip-Pop Song of the Year	Sore / Yaw Tog / O’Kenneth / City Boy / Reggie / Jay Bahd
2021	Producer of the Year	MOG Beatz
2021	Best Male Vocal Performance	Anadwo / King Promise
2021	Best Female Vocal Performance	Adom (Grace) / Diana Hamilton
2021	Performer of the Year	Sarkodie
2021	Woman of the Year	Adina Thembi
2021	Emerging Woman of the Year	Gyakie
2021	Afrobeats/Afropop Song of the Year	Enjoyment / KiDi
2021	Digital Act of the Year	Empress Gifty
2021	African Act of the Year	Davido
2021	Breakthrough Act of the Year	Mr Drew
2021	Next Rated Act	Malcom Nuna
2021	DJ of the Year	DJ Aroma
2021	Music Legends Honorary Award	Elder S.K. Appiah
2021	Album of the Year	Anloga Junction / Stonebwoy
2021	Music Video of the Year	Fancy / Amaarae

=== 2022: 5th 3 Music Awards ===
The 2023 edition of the awards was postponed as a result of financial difficulties, per a statement by the organizers.

== See also ==
- List Of Ghanaian Awards
