= Eastern Music Awards =

Award scheme in Ghana

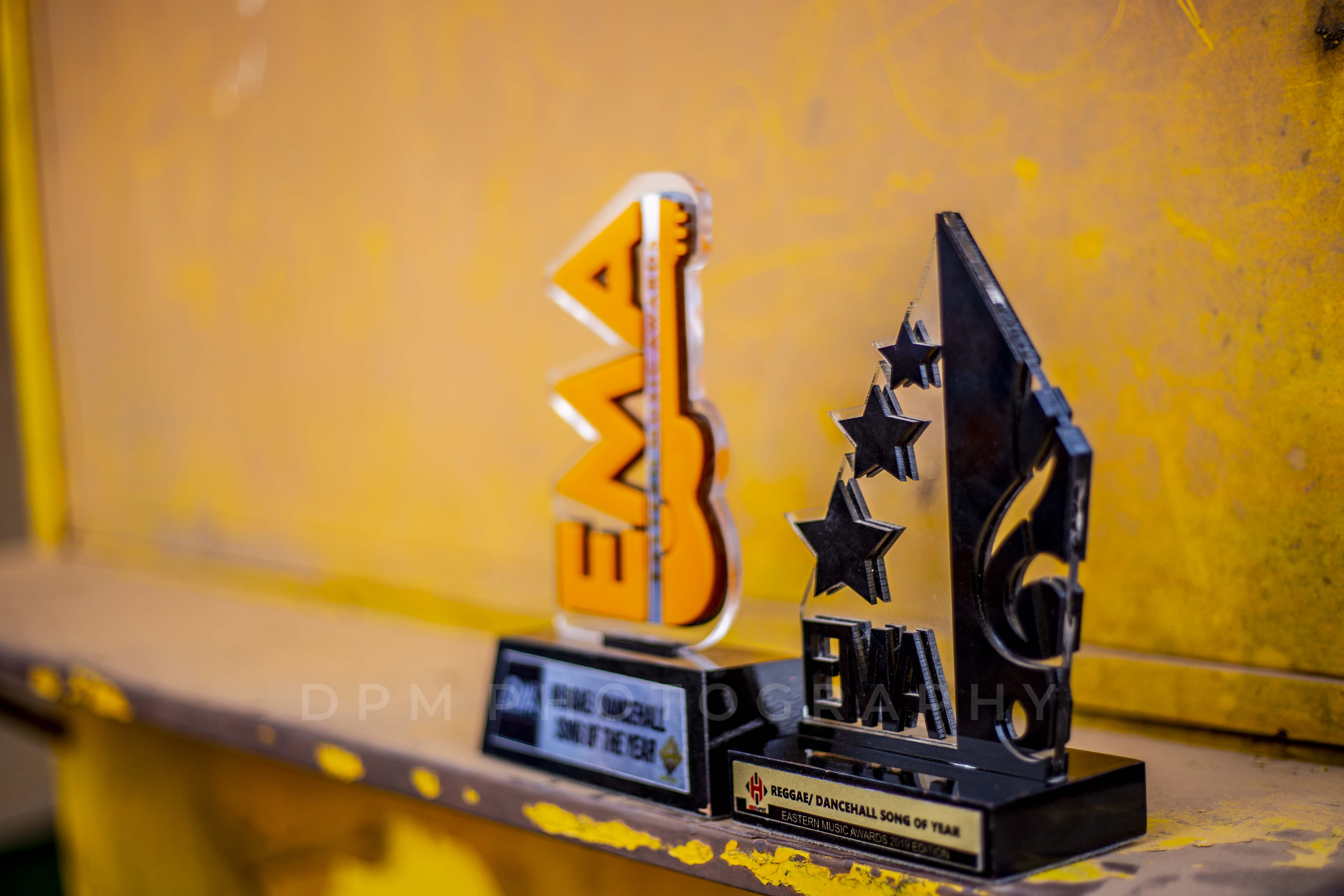
- Eastern Music Awards trophy
- Awarded for: Outstanding in the music industry
- Country: Ghana
- Presented by: Hi5 Empire
- First award: 2017
- Website: https://easternmusicawards.com

The Eastern Music Awards (EMA) is an award scheme specially created to honor excellence in creative art by Hi5 Empire. It is organized annually with support from PATER The Presenters Association Eastern Region, Eastern MUSIGA and other stakeholders. The awards scheme seeks to put more focus on music for industry players from the Eastern Region of Ghana. The awards night every year features artists from Various parts of the Eastern Region. The 4th Edition of the Eastern Music Awards took place on Saturday, 19 December 2020.

== Background ==
The Eastern Music Awards were launched in 2017, with the first event taking place in Koforidua on Saturday 8 October 2017.

== Trophy/plaque ==
The trophy/plaque presented to winners of the various categories has been modified and changed over the years. Currently, the trophy is made of an acrylic glass guitar with EMA on a wooden handle.

== Nomination process ==
Categories along with Definitions are out doored every year prior to Opening of Nomination. Artists, Managers, Record Labels and Stake Holders are educated on the categories before they file for nominations. Entries are received every year through the EMA official website (www.easternmusicawards.com).

== Awards categories ==
- Artist of the Year
- Hiplife/Hip Hop Act of the Year
- Song of the Year
- Hip Hop Song of the Year
- Promoter of the Year
- Collaboration of the Year
- Reggae-Dancehall Song of the Year
- Reggae-Dancehall Act of the Year
- Best Group of the Year
- Eastern International Act of the Year
- East-side Song of the Year
- Rap Act of the Year
- Most Promising Act of the Year
- Gospel Song of the Year
- Gospel Act of the Year
- Highlife Song of the Year
- Highlife Act of the Year
- Male Vocalist of the Year
- Female Vocalist of the Year
- Afropop Song of the Year
- Afropop Act of the Year
- Eastern Pride of the Year
- Most Influential Act of the Year
- Viral Song of the Year
- Sound Engineer of the Year
- Music Producer of the Year
- Music Video of the Year
- Video Director of the Year

=== Eastern Music Award for Artist of the Year ===
Artist of the Year is the topmost award, given to the artist(s) adjudged by the Academy, Board and the general public as having the highest audience appeal and popularity. The artist(s) must have released a hit single/album during the year under review.

==== Artist of the Year award winners ====
- 2017: Koo Ntakra
- 2018: Kuami Eugene
- 2019: Phada Gaza
- 2020: Stone Gee
- 2021 Tee Rhyme
- 2022 Ko7
- 2023 Stone Gee
- 2024 Dassebreba Kwame
- 2025 El Jena
