= Yaw Tog =

Ghanaian rapper

Yaw Tog..
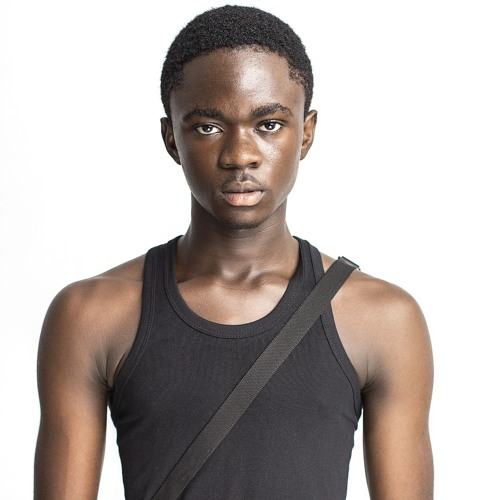

Background information
- Also known as: YT, Young Bull
- Born: Thorsten Owusu Gyimah; 8 May 2003 (age 23); Kumasi, Ghana
- Genres: Drill music, rap, hip pop
- Occupation: Rapper
- Years active: 2019–present
- Label: Tog Life Music

Thorsten Owusu Gyimah (born 8 May 2003), popularly known as Yaw Tog, is a Ghanaian rapper who majors in drill music, known in Ghana as Asakaa. He is best known for his viral song "Sore" which featured O'Kenneth, City Boy, Reggies & Jay Bahd and also Kwesi Arthur and Stormzy on the remix produced by Chris Rich.

== Education ==
Gyimah was a student of Opoku Ware Senior High School. He wrote his final WASSCE paper on 7 October 2021.

== Personal life ==
Yaw Tog lived all his life in Santasi in Kumasi before he found fame through music. He was discovered by a music video director called Koo Poku whiles he was still in Senior High School.

== Discography ==
=== EP's ===
- Time

=== EPs ===
- Tog City (2025)

=== Track listing ===
1. "Empty Seats"
2. "Scary Money"
3. "Sika Ne Mmaa" (featuring The Man Sudais)
4. "Questions"
5. "Miracle" (featuring Stonebwoy)
6. "City Boy" (featuring Darkovibes)
7. "Wonko Menko"

=== Albums ===
• Young And Matured

=== Singles ===
- Sophia
- Sore feat. O`Kenneth, City Boy, Reggie & Jay Bahd
- Sore Remix feat. Kwesi Arthur & Stormzy
- Y33gye
- Africa
- Empty
- Daben
- Mood
- Time
- Fake Ex
- Boyz
- Gold Friends
- Sei Mu
- Azul with Bad Boy Timz
- Miracle with Stone bowy

== Concerts ==
He performed at the 17th Ghana Party in the Park UK Concert with his manager Joe Avneri.

== Awards and nominations ==
| Year | Award | Category | Nominated work | Result | Ref |
|---|---|---|---|---|---|
| 2021 | 3Music Awards | Breakthrough Artiste of the Year | Himself | Nominated | |
| 2021 | 3Music Awards | Viral Song of the Year | Sore | Nominated | |
| 2021 | 3Music Awards | Hiphop Song of the Year | Sore | Won | |
| 2021 | Global Music Awards Africa | Most Influential Ghanaian Act of the Year | Himself | Nominated | |
| 2021 | Telecel Ghana Music Awards (TGMA) | Best New Artiste | Himself | Nominated | |
| 2021 | Telecel Ghana Music Awards (TGMA) | Best Hip-Pop Song of the Year | Sore | Won | |
| 2021 | Telecel Ghana Music Awards (TGMA) | Hiplife/Hiphop Artist of the Year | Himself | Nominated | |
