= 2021 Ghana Music Awards =

- Awarded for: Outstanding achievement in the Ghanaian music industry between Mid-2020 and Mid-2021
- Date: June 25–26, 2021
- Venue: Grand Arena of the Accra International Conference Centre, Accra
- Country: Ghana
- Presented by: Giovani Caleb; AJ Akuoko-Sarpong; Berla Mundi; Sika Osei
- Website: ghanamusicawards.com

Television/radio coverage
- Networks
- TV3 (within Ghana) (Note: Accessible outside Ghana via DStv and GOtv.); Akwaaba Magic (outside Ghana) (Note: Only accessible via DStv and GOtv.)
- Runtime: 2 hours 45 minutes

The 22nd edition of the Vodafone Ghana Music Awards was held on the 25th and 26th days of June, 2021 at the Grand Arena of the Accra International Conference Centre in Accra to recognize the works of artists in the year under review. It was broadcast by TV3 locally in Ghana and Akwaaba Magic outside Ghana, both accessible outside Ghana via DStv and GOtv.

== Performances ==
| Artist(s) | Song(s) | Link(s) |
|---|---|---|
| Diana Hamilton and Joe Mettle | | |
| Adina | Daddy's Little Girl, Why | |
| Efya | One of Your Own, Best In Me | |
| Mr. Drew | Mood, This Year | |
| Eno Barony | Life, God Is A Woman | |
| KiDi | Send Me Nudes, Spiritual, Touch It | |
| Dead Peepol and Rich Kent | Otan Hunu | |
| Kofi Kinaata | Thy Grace, Thy Grace part 2, Behind The Scenes, Something Nice | |
| Larruso | Gi Dem, Killy Killy | |
| Cina Soul | Die 4 U, Ojorley | |
| Sista Afia | Sika, Paper | |
| Nanky | | Unsung Artiste of the Year performance |
| Bethel Revival Choir | | |
| DopeNation | | |
| Kurl Songz and Kofi Kinaata, Sarkodie | Odo Pa, Seihor, Adona | |
| Kwesi Arthur and Joe boy | Winning, Door, Baajo | |
| Kuami Eugene with Keche, Kwame Yogot, and Okyeame Kwame | Open Gate, No Dulling, Biibi Besi, Yeeko, Dollar On You | |
| Okyeame Kwame | Kpa, Masan Aba, Woara, Yeeko | |
| Medikal | Undertaker Flow, Stop It, La Hustle | |
| Yaw Tog ft Kofi Jamar, Ypee | Sore, Ekorso | |

== Presenters ==
- Giovani Caleb
- AJ Akuoko-Sarpong
- Berla Mundi
- Sika Osei

== Winners and nominees ==
This is the list of winners for the 2021 edition of the event.

| Artist of the Year | Best New Artist of the Year |
|---|---|
| Diana Hamilton; Adina; KiDi; Kuami Eugene; Medikal; Sarkodie | Mr Drew; Amerado; Bosom PYung; Dead Peepol; Gyakie; Kofi Jamar; Kweku Flick; Larruso |
| Best Collaboration of the Year | Best International Collaboration of the Year |
| Happy Day – Sarkodie ft. Kuami Eugene; Take Care of You’ – Adina ft. Stonebwoy; Inna Song’ – Darkovibes ft. King Promise; No Dulling’ – Keche ft. Kuami Eugene; One Man’ – KiDi ft. Adina | Baajo – Kwesi Arthur ft. Joeboy; Favor Everywhere – Celestine Donkor ft. Evelyn Wanjiru; The One – Efya ft Tiwa Savage; Something Nice – Kofi Kinaata ft. Patoranking; Show Body – Kuami Eugene ft. Falz; CEO Flow – Sarkodie ft. E-40; Paper – Sista Afia ft Victor AD; Thomas Pompoyeyaw Rmx – Pappy Kojo ft. Busiswa Gqulu |
| Gospel Song of the Year | Highlife Song of the Year |
| Adom – Diana Hamilton; Blessed – Akesse Brempong ft. Joe Mettle; Favour Everywhere – Celestine Donkor ft. Evelyn Wanjiru; Jesus Over Do – Empress Gifty; Yesu Mo – Joe Mettle; Jesus – MOGmusic; Jejeli – KobbySalm ft. Okey Sokay; Who Say God No Dey – Kofi Karikari | Enjoyment – KiDi; Posti Me – Akwaboah; Playboy – Dada Hafco ft. Akwaboah; Behind The Scenes – Kofi Kinaata; Open Gate – Kuami Eugene; Asabone – Lord Paper ft. Bosom P-Yung; Later – Mr Drew ft. Kelvyn Boy; Party – Sista Afia ft. Fameye |
| Hiplife Song of the Year | Hip-Hop Song of the Year |
| No Dulling – Keche ft. Kuami Eugene; Thank God – DopeNation ft. Kofi Kinaata; Enough Is Enough – Eno Barony ft. Wendy Shay; Long Life – Fameye ft. Kwesi Arthur; Dw3 Remix – Krymi x Drew ft. All Stars; Pilolo – Strongman ft. Kelvyn Boy; Happy Day – Sarkodie ft. Kuami Eugene; Ghetto Boy – Tulenkey ft. Kelvyn Boy & Medikal | Sore – Yaw Tog ft O’kenneth, City Boy, Reggie, Jay Bahd; Ataa Adwoa – Bosom PYung; Otan Hunu – Dead Peepol ft Rich Kent.; Akobam – Joey B ft Medikal & Kofi Mole; Ekorso – Kofi Jamar ft. Yaw Tog & Ypee; Money – Kweku Flick Live from 233 – Kwesi Arthur; La Hustle Remix – Medikal ft Joey B & Criss Waddle; Force Dem To Play Nonsense – Eno Barony ft. Sister Derby & Strongman |
| Reggae/Dancehall Song of the Year | Afrobeats/Afropop Song of the Year |
| Why – Adina; Sheriff – MzVee; Forever – Samini; Lonely – Jah Lead; Killy Killy Rmx – Larruso ft. Stonebwoy & Kwesi Arthur; Make Up – Kaphun ft. Stonebwoy; Gye Diee – Ras Kuuku ft. MOG Music; Mi Dey Up Rmx – Kofi Jamar ft. Stonebwoy | Say Cheese – KiDi; Take Care of You – Adina ft. Stonebwoy; Inna Song – Darkovibes ft. King Promise; Forever – Gyakie; Momo – Kelvyn Boy ft. Mugeez & Darkovibes; Sisa – King Promise; Turn On the Lights – Kwesi Arthur; Let Me Know – Mr Drew; Maria – Camidoh; Emergency’ – Wendy Shay |
| Afrobeats/Afropop Artist of the Year | Unsung Act |
| KiDi; Adina; Darkovibes; Camidoh; Kelvyn Boy; King Promise; Mr. Drew; Wendy Shay | Nanky; Oseikrom Sikani; Malcolm Nuna; Kwame Yogot; Kobby Tuesday; Naana Blu; Adelaide The Seer; Queendalyn Yurglee |
| Best Collaboration of the Year | EP of the Year |
| Happy Day – Sarkodie ft. Kuami Eugene; Take Care of You – Adina ft. Stonebwoy; Inna Song – Darkovibes ft. King Promise; No Dulling – Keche ft. Kuami Eugene; One Man – KiDi ft. Adina; Ekorso – Kofi Jamar ft. Yaw TOG & Ypee; La Hustle Remix’ – Medikal ft. Joey B & Criss Waddle.; Sore – Yaw TOG ft. O’kenneth, City Boy, Reggie, Jay Bahd | Blue – KiDi; Seed – Gyakie; Different – GuiltyBeatz; Mood Swings – Edem; This Is Not The Tape, Sorry For The Wait II – Kwesi Arthur; The Truth – Kofi Jamar |
| Gospel Artist of the Year | Highlife Artist of the Year |
| Diana Hamilton; Akesse Brempong; Joe Mettle; Celestine Donkor; Empress Gifty; MOG Music; Efe Grace; Eric Jeshrun | Kuami Eugene; Akwaboah; Fameye; Kofi Kinaata; Sista Afia; Dada Hafco |
| Reggae/Dancehall Artist of the Year | Best Video of the Year |
| [[Epixode|]] Epixode; Samini; Ras Kuuku; Kaphun; Larruso | Baddest Boss – MzVee; Why – Adina; Fancy – Amaarae; Adom – Diana Hamilton.; Cold – Joey B; Open Gate – Kuami Eugene; On the Street – Kweku Smoke; Let Me Know – Mr Drew; Kpa – Okyeame Kwame; Thomas Pompoyeyaw Rmx – Pappy Kojo ft. Busiswa Gqulu |
| Instrumentalist of the Year | Songwriter of the Year |
| Nana Yaw Sarfo Prince; Joshua Moszi; Sennah Prince; Bludo Emmanuel; Owuraku Kissi Enoch | Behind The Scenes – Kofi Kinaata; Adom – Diana Hamilton; Hyedin – Adina; Yesu Mo – Joe Mettle; Adun Lei – Abiana; Too Much – Epixode |
| Record of the Year | Hiplife/Hip Hop Artist of the Year |
| Daddy’s Little Girl – Adina; Be Your Own Beautiful – Adomaa; Fancy – Amaarae; Die 4 U – Cina Soul; Too Much – Epixode; Diplomatic Teef – Trigmatic; Commot – Worlasi; Mmusuo – Yaa Yaa | Medikal; Eno Barony; Joey B; Keche; Kofi Jamar; Kwesi Arthur; Sarkodie; Yaw TOG |
| Male Vocalist of the Year | Best Group of the Year |
| MOG Music; KiDi; Joe Mettle; Akwaboah; Kyei Mensahll; Kingsley Amporful | Keche; Bethel Revival Choir; DopeNation; Dead Peepol |
| African Artist of the Year | Female Vocalist of the Year |
| Master KG; Burna Boy; Davido; Wizkid; Fireboy DML; Omah Lay | Adun Lei – Abiana; Hear Me – Adina; Die 4 U – Cina Soul; Mmusuo – Yaa Yaa; Lord Have Your Way – Efe Grace; Fill Me – Enuonyam |
| Producer of the Year | Best Rap Performance |
| Richie Mensah; Chris Rich Beats; Yung Demz; StreetBeatz | God Is A Woman – Eno Barony; Best Rapper – Amerado; Cold – Joey B; Stop It – Medikal; Brown Paper Bag – Sarkodie ft. M.anifest; Flawless – Strongman |
| Vodafone Most Popular Song of the Year | Album of the Year |
| Adom – Diana Hamilton; Ataa Adwoa – Bosom PYung; No Dulling – Keche ft. Kuami Eugene; Enjoyment – KiDi; Sisa – King Promise; Ekorso – Kofi Jamar; Open Gate – Kuami Eugene; La Hustle Remix – Medikal; Happy Day – Sarkodie; Sore – Yaw Tog; Say Cheese – KiDi; Inna Song – Darkovibes | Araba – Adina; Kpanlogo – Darkovibes; Son of Africa – Kuami Eugene; The Truth – Medikal; Invincible – MzVee; 10 AM – Strongman; Blackstar – Kelvyn Boy; Lava Feels – Joey B |
