= 2024 Ghana Music Awards =

- Awarded for: Outstanding achievement in the Ghanaian music industry between Mid-2023 and Mid-2024
- Sponsored by: Telecel Ghana
- Date: June 1 – 2, 2024
- Venue: Grand Arena of the Accra International Conference Centre, Accra
- Country: Ghana
- Presented by: Chris Attoh; Naa Ashorkor; AJ Akuoko-Sarpong; Fiifi Coleman
- Website: ghanamusicawards.com

Television/radio coverage
- Networks
- TV3 (within Ghana) (Note: Accessible outside Ghana via DStv and GOtv.); Akwaaba Magic (outside Ghana) (Note: Only accessible via DStv and GOtv.)
- Runtime: 7 hours

The 25th edition of the Ghana Music Awards, sponsored for the first time by Telecel Ghana, was held on the 1st and 2nd days of June, 2024 at the Grand Arena of the Accra International Conference Centre in Accra to recognize the works of artists in the year under review. It was broadcast by TV3 locally in Ghana and Akwaaba Magic outside Ghana, both accessible outside Ghana via DStv and GOtv.

== Performances ==
Artist(s)	Song(s)	Link(s)
King Promise	CCTV; Favorite Story; Terminator; Paris	
Kuami Eugene	Canopy; Broken Heart; Monica	
Kwesi Amewuga	Ase3; Prepare	Unsung Artiste of the Year Award performance
The Band Fra	You Dey Feel The Vibe	
Efya	Oluwa Is My Helper; Super Super	
King Paluta	Aseda	
Kwabena Kwabena	Kanea Maye Kyere Me	Tribute to Lifetime Achievement Award recipient Amakye Dede.
Akwaboah Jnr And Eno Barony	Su Fre Wo Nyame	Tribute to Lifetime Achievement Award recipient Amakye Dede.
Fameye	Iron Boy	Tribute to Lifetime Achievement Award recipient Amakye Dede.
Epixode	Adukuro Mu Nsuo	Tribute to Lifetime Achievement Award recipient Amakye Dede.
Amakye Dede	Akwaada Wesoa/Sokoo Na Mmaa Pe	
The Choruses	A Tribute Song For All Gone Souls	
Stonebwoy	Manodzi; Life and Money; Your Body (then unreleased); Into The Future; Apotheke; Ekelebe; Overlord	
Amerado	Me Y3 Ghana Music (unreleased); Kwaku Ananse; Tin ton tan	
Nacee	Aseda; Yesu adi nkunim (Tribute to KODA)	
Mr. Drew	Sneaky; Case	
T Blaze	Feeling No Y3 Deep; Wo Sisi Ye Wo Ya	
Mzbel	Awoso Me; 16 Years	
Okyeame Kwame	Woso	
Akatakyie	Odo Esisi Me	
Reggie Rockstone	Fa Me Bone Ky3 Me Wai; Skolom	

== Presenters ==
The event was hosted by :

- Chris Attoh
- Naa Ashorkor Mensah–Doku.
- AJ Akuoko–Sarpong
- Fiifi Coleman

== Winners and nominees ==
This is the list of winners for the 2024 edition of the event.

Artist of the Year	Best Gospel Artiste of the Year
Stonebwoy; Black Sherif; King Promise; Kuami Eugene; Nacee; Sarkodie	Nacee; Diana Hamilton; Joe Mettle; Joyce Blessing; Perez Musik; Piesie Esther; Scott Evans; Mable Okyere
Best Reggae/Dancehall Artiste of the Year	Best Reggae/Dancehall Song
Stonebwoy; Epixode; Ras Kuuku; Samini	Efiekuma Love – Kofi Kinaata; Truth – DSL; Stubborn SoulJah – Epixode; San Bra – Samini; Non–Stop – Stonebwoy; Eyeball Remix – Ras Kuuku feat. Samini
Best Gospel Song	Best Highlife Artiste of the Year
Aseda – Nacee; Tears of Joy – Patience Nyarko; Anuonyam – Mabel Okyere; Kaafo – Perez Muzik; Mo – Piesie Esther; 100% – Scott Evans; Say Amen – Diana Hamilton; Victory – JoyceBlessing	Kuami Eugene; Abiana; Kofi Kinaata; Akwaboah; FRA!
Best African Artiste of The Year	Songwriter of the Year
Davido; Rema; Tyla; Asake; Burna Boy; JZyNO	Manodzi – Stonebwoy feat. Angelique Kidjo; Perez Muzik – Don’t Cry; Fameye – Not God; DSL – Truth; Sarkodie – Otan; Akwaboah – Esikyire
Collaboration of the Year	International Collaboration of The Year
Liquor – Kidi feat. Stonebwoy; Lonely Road – O’Kenneth, Xlimkid; Case Remix – Mr Drew feat. Mophty; Twatis – Oseikrom Sikani feat. Kweku Smoke; Kwaku Ananse Remix – Amerado feat. Fameye; Y’ahitte Remix – King Paluta feat. Kuami Eugene; You Dey Feel The Vibe – FRA feat. Nana Yaw Ofori Atta; My Darling – Akwaboah feat. Kwabena Kwabena	Manodzi – Stonebwoy feat. Angelique Kidjo; Scar – Gyakie feat. JBee; Butter My Bread – Jyzno feat. Lasmid; Terminator – King Promise feat. Yung Jon; Cryptocurrency – Kuami Eugene feat. Rotimi; Wotowoto Season – Odumodublvck feat. Black Sherif; Till We Die – Sarkodie feat. Ruger; Perfect Combi – King Promise feat. Gabzy
Best Rap Performance	Best Male Vocal Performance
Strongman – Dear God; The Hardest – Amerado; Warning – Eno Barony; Boasiako – FimFim; 5th August (7) – Lyrical Joe; We Made It – Medikal; Otan – Sarkodie	Kofi Karikari feat. Eternity – You are Great; Perez Muzik – Don’t Cry (Kaafo); Kyei Mensa – Gyidie; Josh Blakk – Hankipanki; Camidoh – Brown Skin Girl; KiDi – I Lied
Best Female Vocal Performance	Best New Artist
Hold My Hands – Queendalyn; Adina – Baby; Abiana – Far Away; Lordina The Soprano – His Grace; Niiella – temple; TiTi Owusu – Make Me Believe	King Paluta; Banzy Banero; DSL; Maya Blu; Olivetheboy; Oseikrom Sikanii
Record of The Year	Album/EP of The Year
Manodzi – Stonebwoy feat Angelique Kidjo; Reckless & Sweet – Amaarae; Far Away – Abiana; Iyawo – Josh Blakk; Me Dan Wo – Joe Mettle feat. Kweku Teye; My Helper – Efya	5th Dimension – Stonebwoy; Taste of Africa – Abiana; Fountain Baby – Amaarae; Love & Chaos – Kuami Eugene; Planning & Plotting – Medikal
Most Popular Song of the Year	Best Music Video
Terminator – King Promise; Hossana – Bandy Banero; Yaya – Black Sherif; Scar – Gyakie feat. JBee; Victory – Joyce Blessing; Liquor – KiDi feat. Stonebwoy; Monica – Kuami Eugene; Case Remix – Mr Drew feat. Mophty; Aseda – Nacee; Goodsin – Olivetheboy; Otan – Sarkodie; Into the Future – Stonebwoy; Kwaku Ananse – Amerado	Cryptocurrency – Kuami Eugene feat. Rotimi; Manodzi – Stonebwoy feat. Angelique Kidjo; Wasted Eyes – Amaarae; Paradise – Black Sherif; Fate – Kuami Eugene; Broken Heart – DJ Vyrusky feat. Kuami Eugene; 100% – Scott Evans; Oil In My Head – Black Sherif; Kweku Playman – Kweku Smoke; Into the Future – Stonebwoy
Best Hiplife/Hip Hop Artist of the Year	Producer of the Year
Black Sherif; Amerado; Medikal; Jay Bhad; King Paluta; Sarkodie	MOG Beatz; Kuami Eugene; Liquid Beats; Killbeatz; Izjoe Beatz; Beatz Vampire
Best Hip Hop Song of The Year	Best Highlife Song
Otan – Sarkodie; KLonely Road – O'Kenneth, Xlimkid; Scar – Gyakie feat. JDee; Sowutuom – Medikal; Dear God – Strongman; Yaya – Black Sherif; Akatanii' – Kweku Smoke; The Hardest – Amerado	Kwaku Ananse – Amerado; Adoley – Camidoh; Party – Adina feat. Kofi Kinaata; Manodzi – Stonebwoy feat. Angelique Kidjo; My Darling – Akwaboah feat. Kwabena Kwabena; Overthinking – Kofi Kinaata; Vero – Kelvyn Boy; Yolo – Kuami Eugene; You Dey Feel The Vibe – FRA! feat. Nana Yaw Ofori Atta; Africa Money – Wendy Shay
Best Afrobeats Song	Best Afropop Song
OliveTheboy; Hossana – Banzy Banero; Broken Heart – DJ Vyrusky feat. Kuami Eugene; Otello – Fancy Gadam feat. Kuami Eugene; Liquor – KiDi; Monica – Kuami Eugene; Case Remix – Mr. Drew feat. Mophty	Terminator – King Promise; Super Super – Efya; Not God Remix – Fameye feat. Stonebwoy; Rent Free – Gyakie; I Lied – KiDi; Bad Boy – Lasmid; Till We Die – Sarkodie feat. Ruger; Into The Future – Stonebwoy
Unsung Artiste of the Year	Best Afrobeat/Afropop Artist
Kwesi Amewuga; Kasar; Lali X Lola; Keeny Ice; Seven Kizs; Alaptawan	King Promise; Gyakie; Camidoh; KiDi; Mr. Drew; Efya; Wendy Shay
Audio Engineer of the Year	Best Video Director
Miz Master Gary – Manodzi by Stonebwoy feat. Angelique Kidjo; Killing Skills – Reckless and Sweet by Amaarae; Liquid Beats – Far Away by Abiana feat. Fameye; Josh Blakk and Richard Nwankwo – Iyawo by Josh Blakk; Loudaa – My Helper (Oluwa) by Efya; Daniel Ayittah – Me Dan Wo by Joe Mettle feat. Kweku Teye	Yaw Skyface – Manodzi by Stonebwoy feat. Angelique Kidjo; Lauren Dunn – Wasted Eyes by Amaarae; David Nicole–Sey – Paradise by Black Sherif; Xbill Ebenezer – Fate by Kuami Eugene; Rex – Broken Heart by DJ Vyrusky feat. Kuami Eugene; The Boldz – 100% by Scott Evans; Babs Direction – Oil In My Head by Black Sherif; Bani World – Kweku Playman by Kweku Smoke; Jwillz – Into the Future by Stonebwoy; Xbill Ebenezer – Cryptocurrency by Kuami Eugene feat. Rotimi
Music For Good	Lifetime Achievement Award
Eugene Zuta	Amakye Dede
