= Nana Kofi Asihene =

Ghanaian film producer (born 1980)

- Birth name: Nana Kofi Asihene
- Born: 13 June 1980 (age 45); Accra
- Occupation(s): filmmaker, creative consultant, designer
- Years active: 2009–present
- Website: nanakofiasihene.com

Nana Kofi Asihene (born 13 June 1980; professionally known as Nana Asihene) is a Ghanaian music video director, creative consultant, film producer and film maker.

He has worked with several musical genres and artists including Sarkodie, Stonebwoy, Kwabena Kwabena, R2Bees, Mr Eazi, Ayigbe Edem, Ice Prince, Pappy Kojo, and many others.

== Early life ==
Asihene was born in Accra, where he attended Glory Primary and JHS and Accra Academy where he studied Visual Arts. He further had his Diploma in Fine Art from the Ultimate School of Art. He studied Textile Design at the Kwame Nkrumah University of Science and Technology and got an MBA from the Accra Business School.

== Career ==
Asihene went into music and film production in 2009. He has worked for brands like Vodafone Ghana on the Life on Vodafone 4G project. He is currently the Creative Director and Lead Consultant at NKACC which is a brands and communication company. He works in Fashion as a designer and has established Nana Asihene Design Studio, .

== Personal life ==
Asihene is related to Theodosia Okoh and T-Michael.

== Selected videography ==
- Mr Eazi ft Efya - Skintight
- Ice Prince ft Sarkodie - Shots on Shots
- Sarkodie ft Castro - Adonai Remix
- Ayigbe Edem ft Kaakie - Latex
- Ayigbe Edem ft Raquel - Girlfriend
- EL ft Shaker – See Me Suffer
- Stonebwoy ft Patoranking – Pull Up Remix
- Yaa Yaa – Kae
- Kwabena Kwabena ft Samini – Adult Music
- Lord Paper ft Mr Eazi – Call on Me
- Tinny – Regular Champion
- R2Bees – Makoma
- Itz Tiffany – Dance (Neke Neke)
- Chase Forever – Lonely
- Sarkodie ft Obrafour - Saa Okodie No

== Awards ==
Year	Project	Ceremony	Category	Result
2008	Fashion	British Council's Award	International Young Fashion Entrepreneur	Won
2013	Chase, "Lonely"	Vodafone Ghana Music Awards	Best Music Video	Won
2015	Stonebwoy, "Pull Up (Remix)"	MTN 4syte TV Music Video Awards	Best Music Video	Won
2024	AAHI (Short Film)	Ghana Movie Awards	Best Short Film	Won
