= Mr Drew =

Ghanaian singer and dancer

- Born: Andrew Nii Commey Otoo; 10 June 1996 (age 30); Accra, Ghana
- Genres: Afrobeats, highlife
- Occupations: Musician, singer, songwriter
- Years active: 2017–present
- Label: Highly Spiritual Music (Parted ways with artist)

Andrew Nii Commey Otoo (born 10 June 1996) known by the stage name Mr Drew is a Ghanaian highlife and Afrobeats musician and dancer. In 2021, he won the Best New Artist award at both Vodafone Ghana Music Awards and 3Music Awards.

== Early life and education ==
Mr Drew was born in Accra in the Greater Accra Region of Ghana. He attended the Achimota Senior High School.

== Career ==
Mr Drew started off as a dancer when he was in senior high school before later switching to become a musician full time. His career officially started when he joined and became the first runner-up at the MTN Hitmaker Season 6 in 2017. The MTN Hitmaker Mr Drew was signed to Highly Spiritual Music founded by music producer and engineer Kaywa. He however parted ways with the label after working together for five (5) years due to unfavorable terms and conditions in the contract later discovered.

For showing gratitude to Kaywa's Highly Spiritual Music, the award winning artist decided to relinquish his royalties to his former label boss, Kaywa.

Mr Drew released his debut album in 2021 named ALPHA, the album featured names like Victor AD, Seyi Shay, Kwabena Kwabena, Kelvyn Boy, Raybekah and KiDi.

== Discography ==
=== Singles ===
- Gimme Love
- Simajorley
- Agbelemi Feat DopeNation & Incredible Zigi
- Dw3 Feat Sarkodie & KRYMI
- Dw3 Remix Feat Bosom P Yung, KRYMI, Kofi Mole, DopeNation, Quamina MP & Fameye
- Later Feat Kelvyn Boy
- Let Me Know
- This Year
- Mood
- Pains
- Shuperu Feat KiDi
- S3K3 Feat Medikal
- Dayana
- Mr Drew - Case ft Mophty
- Mr Drew ft Medikal - SumɔMi(2024)

=== Album ===
- Alpha 2021

==== Track list ====
1. One by One (feat. Victor AD)
2. Falaa
3. Some More (Feat. Seyi Shay)
4. Fo (Cry) Feat. Kwabena Kwabena
5. Good Vibes (feat. Kelvyn boy)
6. Party
7. Filomina
8. Zombie
9. Letter (feat. Raybekah)
10. Yaayaa
11. Somebody's Bae
12. Shuperu (feat. KiDi)

== Awards and nominations ==
caption
Year	Event	Award	Recipient/Nominated work	Result	Ref
2019	Vodafone Ghana Music Awards	Unsung Category	Himself	Nominated	
2021	Vodafone Ghana Music Awards	Best New Artist of The Year	Himself	Won	
2021	3Music Awards	Breakthrough Act of the Year	Himself	Won	
2024	Ghana Music Awards	Best Collaboration	Case Remix – Mr Drew ft Mophty	Nominated	
