= Abiana =

Ghanaian singer and songwriter

- Born: Eldah Naa Abiana Dickson; Ghana
- Genres: Soul music, Neo soul, Highlife
- Occupations: Musician, singer, songwriter
- Years active: 2013–present
- Label: +233 Records

Eldah Naa Abiana Dickson better known by her stage name as Abiana is a Ghanaian singer and songwriter. She is a Soul-life, Hi-life, Neo Soul musician. Abiana was adjudged the Best Female Vocal Performance award during the 2021 Vodafone Ghana Music Awards.

== Early life and education ==
Abiana is the first of six children born to Samuel Dickson and Esther Mawusi Kotitse. She attended St John’s Grammar for her secondary school education, before proceeding to Ghana Institute of Management and Public Administration (GIMPA), where she graduated with a Bachelor Science degree in Marketing.

== Music career ==
Abiana started out as a backing vocalist for Afro Harmony Band in 2013. She later joined Hsykul band as the lead singer in 2014 before going solo in 2020 and signing with +233 Records. In 2019, Abiana featured on Okyeame Kwame's “Bolgatanga girl” which won record of the year for the 2020 Vodafone Ghana Music Awards.

She released her first single in October 2020 titled “Adun lei”. Through Adun lei, Abiana gained two nominations at the 2021 Vodafone Ghana Music Awards, in best female vocal performance and song writer categories. She eventually won the female vocalist of the year beating off competition from Adina, Yaa Yaa, Cina Soul, Efe Grace and Enuonyam.

Adun Lei was also nominated for the best photography and best special effect awards at the 2021 4Stye Music Video Awards. The Adun Lei won the best photography award. In December 2020, her second single Amen was released and her third titled Bo Nɔŋŋ Ni in March 2021.

Two weeks after annexing the VGMA award, Abiana released a single titled ‘Me and You’, a love tune which expresses the woes and extremes of love and relationships.

== Notable performances ==
Since starting her solo career, she has performed during several high profile events in Ghana. she performed for the President at the inauguration dinner, performed with blacklace band at the 70th birthday of the First lady and live performances at +233 jazz bar and grill. In July 2021, she performed at the Entertainment achievement awards by Citi FM as well as the 2021 VGMA experience concert.

== Artistry and musical influences ==
Abiana describes her musical style as soul life, encompassing, soul music, hi-life, neo-soul, because most of her tunes and songs have different kinds of eclectic music genres or styles. Abiana also plays the guitar. In an interview with Graphic Showbiz, Abiana cited Alicia Keys as her role model.

== Personal life ==
Abiana's mother Esther Mawusi Kofitse died on 14 July 2021 at the age of 61.

== Discography ==
=== Albums and mixtapes ===
- Alemle Lala (Songs from November) (2021)

=== Singles ===
- Adun lei (2020)
- Amen (2020)
- Bo Nɔŋŋ Ni (2021)
- Me and You

featured on

- Bolgatanga girl Okyeame Kwame ft. Abiana x Atongo Zimba

== Awards and nominations ==
Year	Ceremony	Award	Nominated work	Result	Ref
2022	Vodafone Ghana Music Awards	Female Vocal Performance of the Year	My House	Nominated	
2022	Vodafone Ghana Music Awards	Song writer of the Year	Herself for Bo Nɔŋŋ Ni	Nominated	
2021	Vodafone Ghana Music Awards	Female Vocalist of the Year	Adun lei	Won	
2021	Vodafone Ghana Music Awards	Song writer of the Year	Herself for Adun lei	Nominated	
2021	4Syte TV Music Video Awards	Best Photography	Adun lei	Won	
2021	4Syte TV Music Video Awards	Best Special Effect	Himself	Nominated	
2020	Vodafone Ghana Music Awards	Record of the Year	Bolgatanga girl Okyeame Kwame ft Abiana x Atongo Zimba	Won	
