= Bob Pinodo =

Ghanaian musician

Robert Kweku Idan (popularly known as Bob Pinodo) also known as the Show Master of Africa was a Ghanaian highlife musician, songwriter, producer, and composer. On February 13 2026, his family formally announced his passing and funeral rites.

== Career ==
His professional career started in 1966 and recorded and released his first LP during his stay in Germany in 1977

His album, Show Master of Africa, received air play on BBC winning him awards in various categories like best album, best composition, best production, best recording and album of the millennium by Entertainment Critics and Reviewers Association of Ghana (ECRAG) and the Ghana Broadcasting Corporation (GBC) respectively.

He also taught Dance Band Directing at the University of Education for ten years. In 2017, from the best students in University of Education, Winneba, he formed the GoldCrest Band.

== Discography ==
=== Album ===
Show Master of Africa

- Disco Dance”
- Yesu Ne M’agyenkwa
- Love is Love
- Girl with the Guitar Shape
- Come Back Love
- Africa
- Darling
- Peep

== Awards ==
- He was honoured with the lifetime achievement awards at the 2021 Vodafone Ghana Music Awards.
- He received an award for the most talented musician by the Art Council in 1969.
- The Album Show Master of Africa was adjudged album of the Millennium by the Entertainment Critics and Reviewers Association of Ghana (ECRAG)
