= Dead Peepol =

Ghanaian music duo

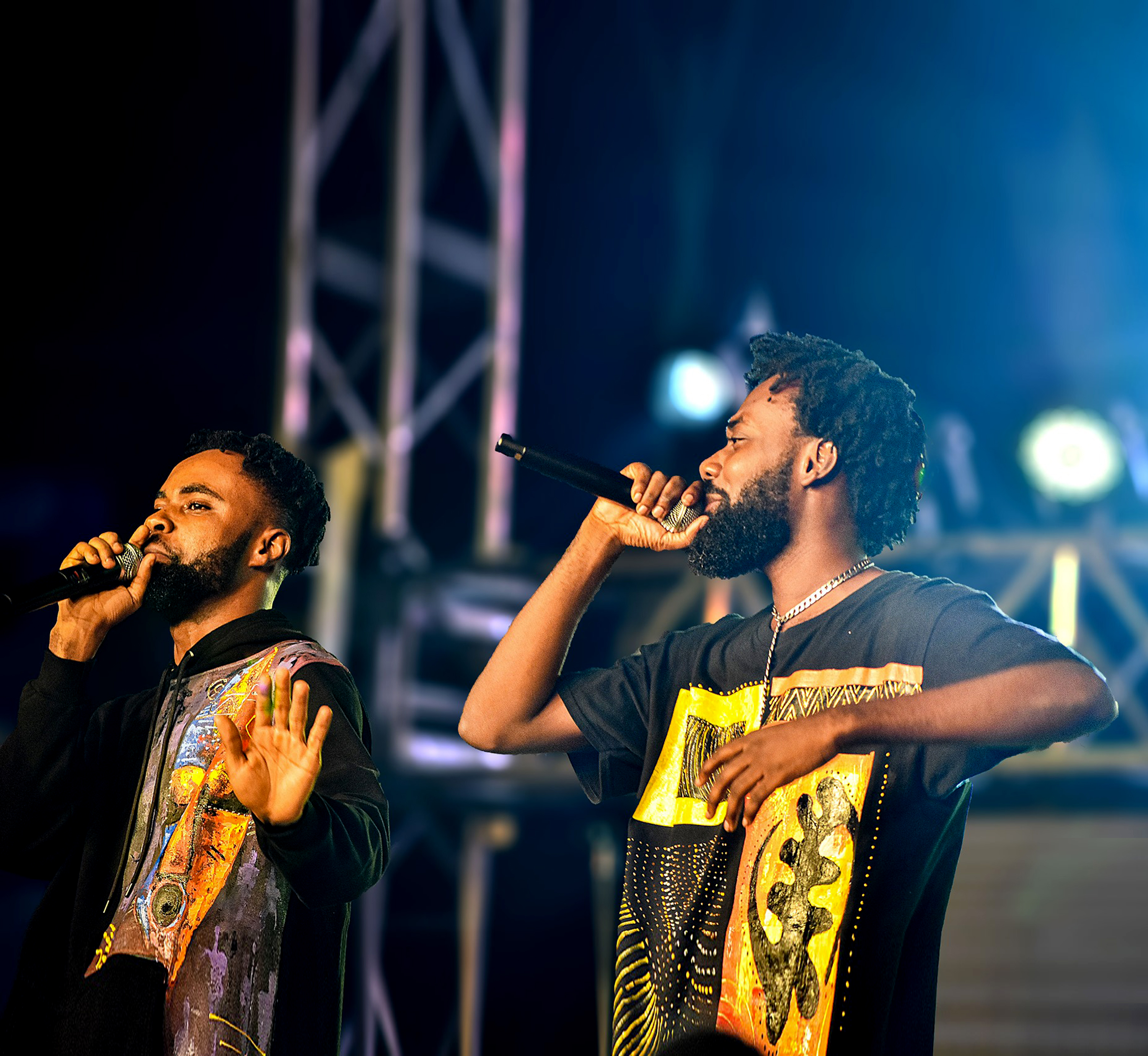

Background information
- Genres: Hiphop, Drill, Hiplife

Dead Peepol is a Ghanaian music duo from Kumasi. They became popular with the hit song 'Otan Hunu'. They released a remix of the song which featured Fameye, Kuami Eugene, Medikal, Deon Boakye, Malcolm Nuna, Rich Kent, Tulenkey and Bosom P-Yung.

== Discography ==
=== Selected singles ===
- Medo Wo More
- Don't Worry Be Happy
- Otan Hunu
- Otan Hunu Remix
- Against
- No Noise

== Videography ==
- Otan Hunu
- Otan Hunu Remix
- Against
- No Noise

== Awards and nominations ==
Year	Award	Category	Nominated work	Result	Ref
2021	3Music Awards	Breakthrough Act Of The Year	Themselves	Nominated	
2021	3Music Awards	Best Group Of The Year	Themselves	Won	
2021	3Music Awards	Hiphop Song Of The Year	Otan Hunu	Nominated	
2021	3Music Awards	Viral Song Of The Year	Otan Hunu	Nominated	
2021	3Music Awards	Song Of The Year	Otan Hunu	Nominated	
2021	3Music Awards	Best Collaboration Of The Year	Otan Hunu	Nominated	
2021	Vodafone Ghana Music Awards	Group Of The Year	Themselves	Nominated	
2021	Vodafone Ghana Music Awards	Hiphop Song of the Year	Otan Hunu	Nominated	
2021	Vodafone Ghana Music Awards	New Artiste of the Year	Themselves	Nominated	
