= Efe Grace =

Ghanaian singer and songwriter

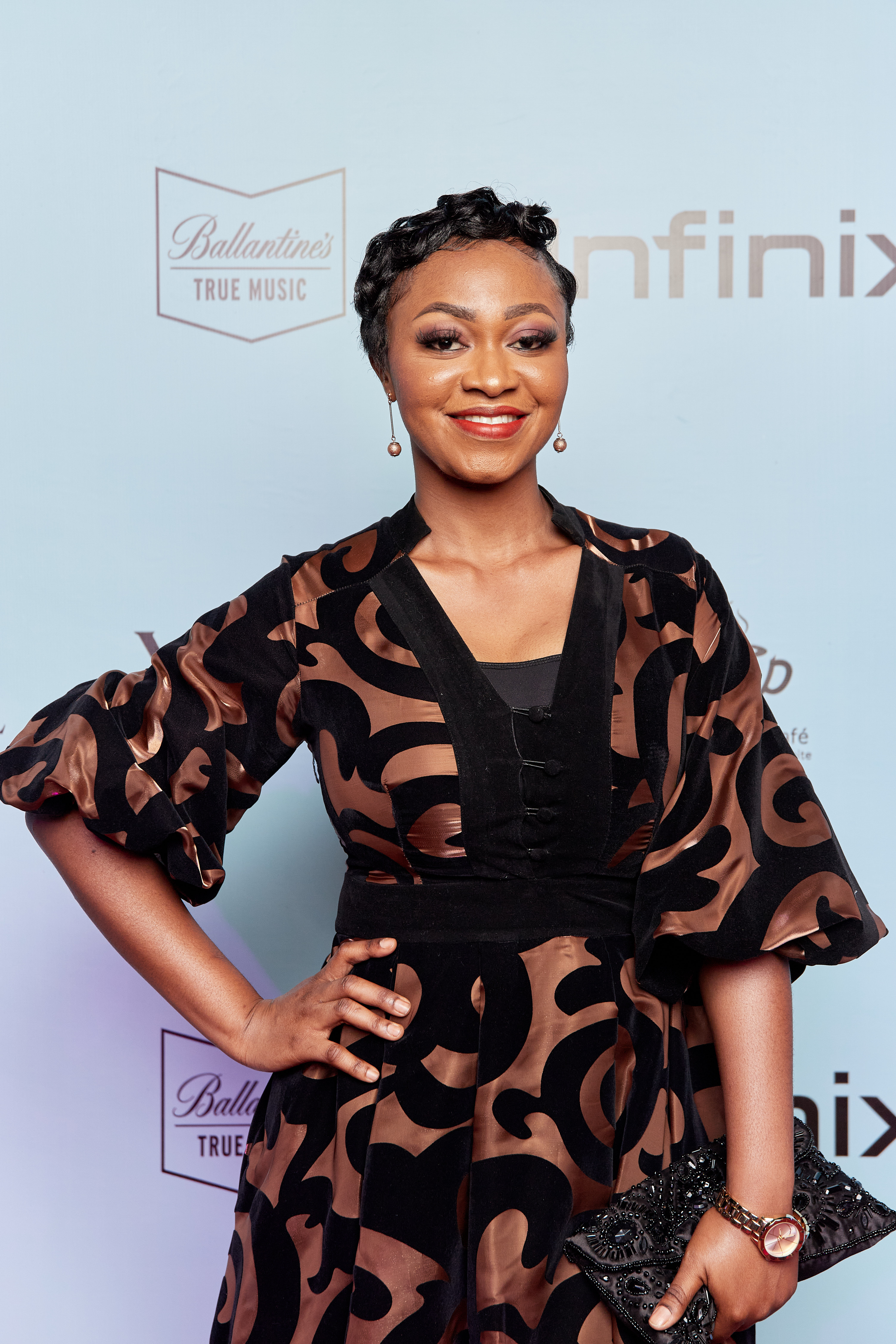

Background information
- Born: Kumasi, Ghana
- Genres: Gospel
- Occupations: Musician, singer, songwriter
- Years active: 2018–present
- Website: efegraceofficial.com

Efe Grace is a Ghanaian singer and songwriter. She is a gospel musician. Efe Grace was nominated for the Gospel Artist of the Year award during the 2021 Vodafone Ghana Music Awards.

== Early life and education ==
Efe Grace hails from Agogo in the Ashanti Region, Ghana. Grace is the daughter of Ghanaian gospel minister, Rev. Mensah Bonsu. She is the eldest of three children. She attended Yaa Asantewaa Girls School and completed in 2006. She furthered her education at Christian Service University College graduating in 2011 with a Bachelor of Business Administration in Banking and Finance.

== Music career ==
Grace started singing whilst she was teenager, joining serving as a backing vocalist for her father. She eventually became a worship leader in her church whilst also serving as a jazz musician at hotels, restaurants, and pubs in Kumasi. She also served as a backing vocalist for Becca and Kwabena Kwabena.

Grace started out as a backing vocalist for Sonnie Badu and Ohemaa Mercy. She released her debut single in October 2018 titled "Yehowa ne M'abankese" which was a refix of her father's song with the same title. She released another single King of Glory. In 2020, she earned her first Vodafone Ghana Music Award nomination for the female Vocalist award category.

Efe Grace was also nominated for the Emerging Woman of the Year and Best Female Vocal Performance for the 2021 3Music Awards.

She gained two nominations for the Gospel Artist of the Year and Best Female Vocal Performance of the Year for her song Lord Have your way at the 2021 Vodafone Ghana Music Awards. The Female Vocal Performance award was subsequently won by Abiana. In September 2021, she released her fourth and firth singles titled Overflow and Sounds of Heaven.

In 2022, Efe Grace again earned three nominations for Gospel Act of the Year, Best Female Vocal Performance for her song Overflow and Performer of the Year for her performance at 2021 3Music Women's Brunch Performance.

== Notable performances ==
Since starting her solo career, she has performed at the Ghana Music Awards where she performed with Ohemaa Mercy and Joe Mettle. Hope Concert and Ignite Virtual Concert. She also performed at the 2021 3Music Women's Brunch.

== Discography ==
=== Singles ===
- Yehowa ne M'abankese (2019)
- King of Glory (2019)
- Lord Have your way (2020)
- Overflow (2021)
- Sound of Heaven (2021)

== Awards and nominations ==
Year	Ceremony	Award	Nominated work	Result	Ref
2020	Vodafone Ghana Music Awards	Female Vocal Performance of the Year	King of Glory	Nominated	
2021	3Music Awards	Female Vocalist of the Year	Lord Have your way	Nominated	
2021	3Music Awards	Emerging Woman of the Year	Herself	Nominated	
2021	Vodafone Ghana Music Awards	Gospel Artist of the Year	Herself	Nominated	
2021	Vodafone Ghana Music Awards	Female Vocalist of the Year	King of Glory	Nominated	
2022	3Music Awards	Gospel Act of the Year	Herself	Nominated	
2022	3Music Awards	Best Female Vocal Performance	Overflow	Nominated	
2022	3Music Awards	Performer of the Year	2021 3Music Women's Brunch Performance	Nominated	
