= Berima Sean Bills =

Ghanaian MC, music executive, entertainer, and event promoter

- Born: Jeremiah Acquah; 9 October 1989 (age 36); Ashaiman, Ghana
- Occupations: Radio host, event MC, artiste, voice-over artist, music executive
- Years active: 2014–present
- Known for: Hypeman

Jeremiah Acquah (born 9 October 1989), known professionally as Berima Sean Bills or Big Wu, is a Ghanaian MC, music executive, entertainer, and event promoter.

== Early life and education ==
Berima Sean Bills was born in Ashaiman, Tema, Ghana, on 9 October 1989. He attended Peki Senior High School for his secondary education and later studied at the Celebrity School of Broadcasting, where he earned a certificate in Mass Communication with a specialty in radio and television presentation.

== Career ==
Berima Sean Bills began his career after co-founding 360 Degrees INC., an entertainment company focused on promoting upcoming musicians and organizing events.

He later worked as a broadcaster, hosting Friday Night Flex on YFM 102.5 in Kumasi and Accra Country on YFM 107.9 in Accra. In 2019, he became the host of Muse Africa's countdown show on Kwese TV known as #MuseTops, a music magazine and chart show featuring Ghanaian music videos.

In addition to broadcasting, he has released music and collaborated with other musicians. He also served as Head of A&R at Twist Entertainment Legacy.

== Discography ==
=== Singles ===
- "Wo Gyiii" feat. Medikal and Kweku Afro
- "Bigging" feat. Friyie and Broni
- "Freedom & Justice Mix" feat. DJ Millzy
