= StreetBeatz =

Ghanaian record producer (born 1992)

- Born: Bright Kwame Appiah; March 14, 1992 (age 34); Koforidua, Ghana
- Genres: Hip hop, Afrobeat, Hiplife, Highlife, R&B, Afro-pop
- Occupations: record producer, creative director
- Years active: 2013–present
- Label: Indie

Bright Kwame Appiah, known by his stage name Streetbeatz, is a Ghanaian record producer and creative director from Tema.

== Early life ==
Streetbeatz, (born March 14, 1992), the first of five children, was born in Koforidua and raised in Tema, to his mother Rosemond Adomakoa. Streetbeatz started music production at a very young age and continued throughout his educational career. He attended Tema Technical Institute.

== Musical career ==
After Senior High School, Streetbeatz started to live his dream career as producer for many African artistes and the world beyond. He appeared in Groove Zone Records as a computer technician. It was through his computer technics that he met his former production teacher David Kyei (Kaywa) Of Highly Spiritual Entertainment. He also met musicians R2Bees, Sarkodie, Stonebwoy and Castro. He produced for Castro “ENVY” that features BET Awards Winner Stonebwoy, after being impressed by his production skills. After this exposure, He produced a song for BET Awards Winner Stonebwoy “Twin City”. His third production was for Mugeez of the duo group R2Bees, after he also produced for BET Awards Winner Sarkodie “Adonai (Remix)” featuring Castro that became an instant hit and made StreetBeatz a household name within the Ghanaian music industry. In 2015, he got nominated as Producer Of The Year at the Ghana Music Awards.

Since 2018, StreetBeatz has produced records that has been featured on albums by various musicians worldwide. These include New Africa by Fuse ODG, Caribbean Monster by Admiral T, Anloga Junction by Stonebwoy, Kpanlogo by Darkovibes, El Shadai (Afro Sicilian) by Shadowboy Mysic, among others.

== Awards and nominations ==
Year	Event	Category	Recipient	Result
2015	Vodafone Ghana Music Awards	Music Producer Of The Year	Himself	Nominated
2018	Ghana Music Awards UK	Producer Of The Year	Himself	Nominated
2020	3 Music Awards, Ghana	Producer Of The Year	Himself	Nominated
2020	Muse Bangerz Of the Quarter, (Half-Year Edition)	Producer Of The Year	Himself	Nominated

== Production discography ==
=== Singles ===
- 2013
1. Stonebwoy: Same Girl
2. Castro: Envy Ft. Stonebwoy
3. Stonebwoy: Twin City Ft. Humble Dis
- 2014
1. Sarkodie: Adonai Remix Feat Castro
2. Mugeez: Ragga
3. Edem: Zero To Hero Ft. Akwaboah
4. Jay Bagz: Control
5. Vibz: Baby Mama Ft. Sarkodie
6. Stay Jay: Goodness & Mercy
7. Keche: Diabetes Ft. Bisa Kdei
- 2015
1. Jay Bagz: Crazy
2. Mac Nuru: Born To Win Ft Ruff n Smooth
3. Humble Dis: Bend Over Ft. Virgo
4. Piesie: Party Anthem
- 2016
1. Criss Waddle: Bie Gya Ft. Stonebwoy
2. Donzy: Club Ft. Sarkodie & Piesie
3. Omar Sterling: Friday Ft. Humble Dis & Teejay
4. Keche: ATINKA
- 2017
1. Dr Cryme: Dab Ft. Piesie
2. Nana Boroo: Akiti Ft. Donzy
3. Donzy: Pressure
4. R2Bees: Plantain Chips
5. Stonebwoy: Hero
6. Donzy: Wontia Ft. Flowking Stone
7. Stonebwoy: Bawasaaba
- 2018
1. Nana Boroo Feat. Sarkodie: Broken Heart
2. Keche: They Say
3. Keche: Atinka
- 2019
1. Stonebwoy Feat. Beenie Man: Shuga
2. Stonebwoy: Tuff Seed
3. OV Feat. Stonebwoy: Want Me
4. Admiral T Feat. Edem: Hello Hello
5. Fuse ODG: Happy Yourself
6. Stonebwoy: Big Boss
7. ZeeTM:Totori feat. Fancy Gadam
- 2020
1. Stonebwoy: African Party
2. Stonebwoy Feat. Diamond Platnumz: Black Maddona
3. Adina Feat. Stonebwoy: Take Care Of You
4. Darkovibes Feat. King Promise: Inna Song
5. Darkovibes: Emotional
6. Shadowboy Myzic: COVID-19
