= Josh Blakk =

Ghanaian musician

- Born: Joshua Owusu Afriyie; Accra
- Origin: Ghana
- Genres: Soul; Hiplife; Afrobeats
- Occupation: Musician

Joshua Owusu Afriyie, also known as Josh Blakk, is a Ghanaian musician.

== Early life ==
He was born in Accra and started learning how to play musical instrument at the age of seven.

== Career ==
Josh Blakk's music genre is a mixture of soul, highlife and Afrobeats. He performs with his band known as Blakknoters band.

=== Reality show ===
Performing at the Vodafone Icons; a music reality show to unearth new music talent in Ghana, he then participated in the Project Fame music talent show which was held in Nigeria.

=== Performances ===
Josh Blakk hosted and performed his O.N.E album in December, 2023. Saying goodbye to the year, he connected with his fans whiles they watched him perform the songs on his album.

Josh Blakk started a tour in Africa called the "One Way Tour," which began in February in Accra, moved to Lagos and will now stop in Nairobi, Johannesburg and Toronto, Canada.

== Nominations ==
- Josh Blakk got two nominations in the 25th Telecel Music Awards which were Best Male Vocal Performance (Hankipanki) and Record of the Year (Iyawo).
- Josh Blakk named Apple Music Up Next artist.

== Discography ==
=== Albums ===
- O.N.E
- Luminis
