= Lord Paper =

Ghanaian musician (born 1990)

- Born: Michael Takyi-Frimpong; October 11, 1990 (age 35)
- Origin: Accra, Ghana
- Genres: hip hop, soul, afrobeats
- Occupation: singer
- Years active: 2010 – present
- Label: Auzy Media

Michael Takyi-Frimpong (born October 11, 1990) known by the stage name Lord Paper is a Ghanaian soul, afrobeats and hip hop musician. He is best known for his 2016 single "Awurama".

== Early life ==
Lord Paper was born in Accra but hails from Mampong, a suburb of Mampong Municipal District, a town in the Ashanti Region. He completed his senior high school education at Swedru Secondary School in the year 2008 and attended University of Ghana in 2013 for his undergraduate degree.

== Music career ==
He entered the music scene 2010 after leaving his job as an actor in South Africa to pursue full-time music in Ghana (2014). He became famous when he released his debut controversial single and video Awurama in 2016. The song has been criticised over the sexually explicit content of the music video.

== Discography ==
Singles

Awurama	Lord Paper	2016
Pono	Lord Paper	2016
Sika Duro	Lord Paper	2016
Like God Fu*k Up	Lord Paper feat. Wanlov the Kubolor	2016
Financial Rape	Lord Paper feat. Luther	2016
Call On Me	Lord Paper feat. Mr Eazi	2017
North K	Lord Paper	2017
Maame Serwaa	Lord Paper	2017
Insecure	Lord Paper feat. Joey B	2017
Abin Dada	Lord Paper feat. Magnom	2017
SMH	Lord Paper feat. Paq	2017
Mmaa No Feeli Mi	Lord Paper feat. Jason El	2017
Love No Catch You Before	Lord Paper	2018
Antipey	Lord Paper	2018
Fa Me Ye	Lord Paper	2018
Love No Catch You Before Remix	Lord Paper feat Medikal	2019
Dzigbordi	Lord Paper	2019
Asabone	Lord Paper feat Bosom P Yung	2020
Her Story	Lord Paper	2020
Jane	Lord Paper	2024

== Awards and nominations ==
=== Vodafone Ghana Music Awards ===
Year	Organization	Recipient/Nominated work	Award	Result	Ref
2020	Vodafone Ghana Music Awards	Dzigbordi	Record Of The Year	Nominated	
2020	Vodafone Ghana Music Awards	Himself	Best New Artiste Of The Year	Nominated	
2021	Vodafone Ghana Music Awards	Asabone	Highlife Song of the Year	Nominated	

=== MTN 4Syte Music Video Awards ===
Year	Recipient	Award	Results	Ref.
2019	Dzigbordi	Best Male Video	Nominated	
