= Joey B =

Ghanaian hip hop artist

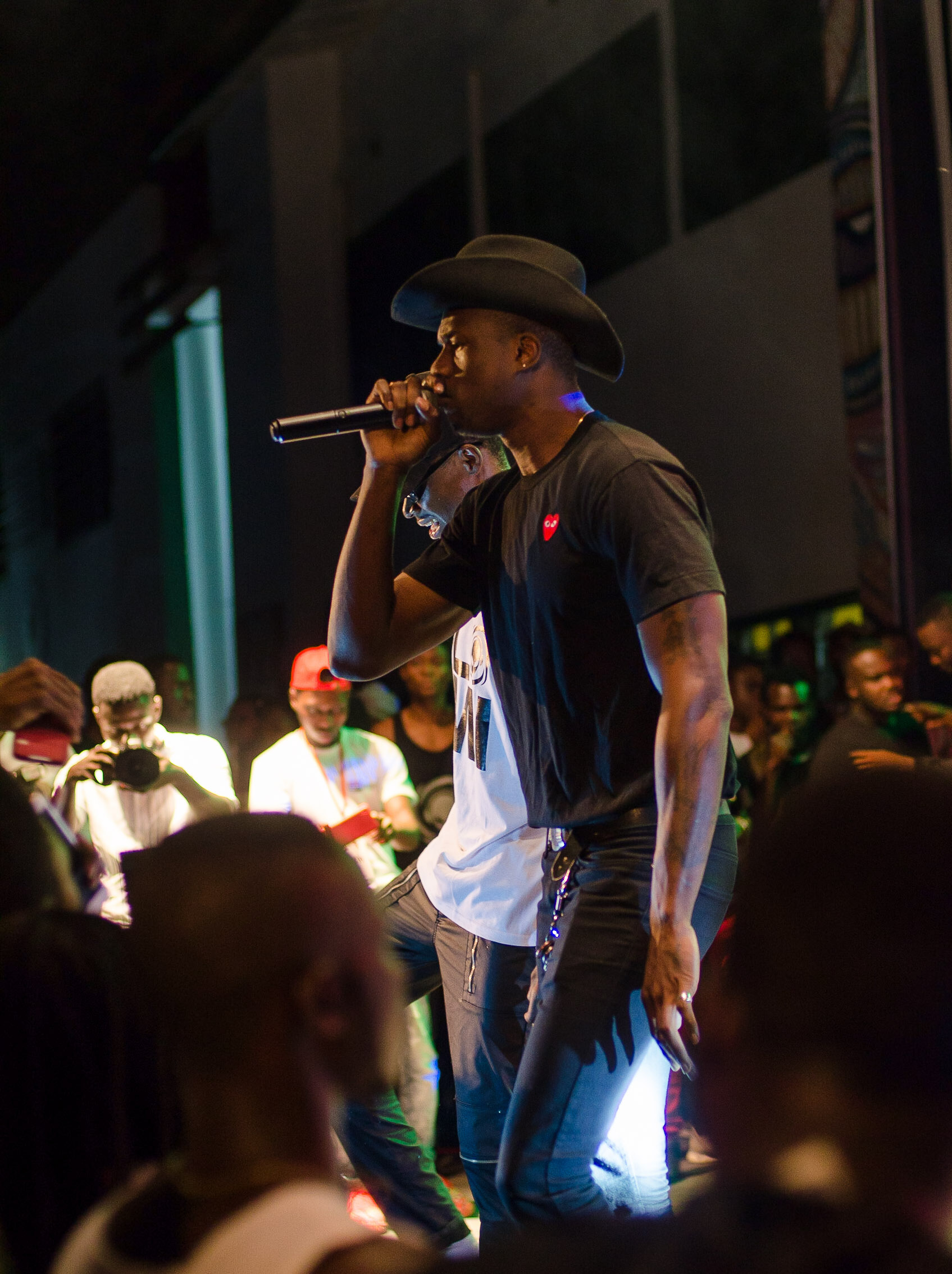
- Portrait of Joey B

Background information
- Also known as: Beezy
- Born: Darryl Paa Kwesi Bannerman-Martin; 20 August 1989 (age 36); Cape Coast, Central Region, Ghana
- Origin: fante
- Genres: Hip hop, Soul, R&B
- Occupation: Musician
- Instrument: vocals
- Years active: 2009-present
- Label: World Records
- Website: http://joeybeezy.world/

Darryl Paa Kwesi Bannerman-Martin (born 20 August 1989), known under the stage name Joey B, is a Ghanaian hip hop recording artist. He is well known for his single "Tonga".

== Early life and career ==
Joey B was born in Accra, Ghana. He realized his talent for music at age six when he formed a group and aided in ghostwriting most of the songs they made together. This bolstered his unrelenting strong desire for music and pursued it. He had his primary education at St. Theresa's School and later went to Accra High School. He graduated at Zenith University College in 2016.

Later on, he collaborated with producer Lil Shaker until they met Jayso, the founder of Skillions. From then on, he has worked with various labels and producers such as Hammer of The Last Two and Black Avenue Music and produced many hit songs such as "Tonga", “Pinch mah Nips”, and "Strawberry". He was nominated the Hip-life/Hiphop Artist of the Year at the 2021 Vodafone Ghana Music Awards.

== Collaborations and influences ==
On his career path, Joey B has collaborated with artists such as Sarkodie, EL, Fuse ODG, Edem and many others. The rapper's music has been influenced by several artists such as Kanye West and Kid Cudi.

In September 2015, Roc Nation's rapper, Vic Mensa who was on a short trip to Ghana for his grandmother's funeral, disclosed he would love to work with Joey B and Sarkodie. The following year, Vic Mensa again on Beats 1 Radio interview with Ebro Darden, tipped listeners of possible collaborations with Joey B, Sarkodie and M.anifest.

== Fashion style and brand ambassador for Adidas ==
In July 2015, a manufacturer of sports shoes, clothing and accessories; Adidas (Ghana) outdoor Joey B as their brand ambassador, making him the first in Africa.

== Discography ==
=== EPs ===
- LAVA FEELS (2020)
- Darryl (2017)

=== Selected singles ===
- "Ranger" feat. Darkovibes
- "La Familia" feat. Sarkodie and Kwesi Arthur
- "Green Tea" feat. Medikal
- "Kiss & Tell"
- "No Waste Time" feat. Boj
- "Taya" feat. Darkovibes and RJZ
- "Greetings From Abroad" feat. Pappy Kojo
- "911" feat. Medikal
- "Stables" feat. La Même Gang
- You Peh Freestyle
- Beautiful Boy feat. Wanlov and Ponobiom
- Nsa (2018)
- Sweetie Pie] feat. King Promise - (2018)
- NewLords (feat Pappy Kojo and Sarkodie) (2017)
- Baby Mama (feat Sarkodie)(2017)
- Sunshine (2017)
- U x Me (2016)
- F.O.H (feat. Medikal) (2016)
- Otoolege (feat. Samini) (2015)
- Wow (feat. EL and Pappy Kojo) (2015)
- Tonga (feat. Sarkodie) (2014)
- Wave (feat. Pappy Kojo) (2014)
- Cigarette (2013)
- Strawberry Ginger (2013)
- Chop Kenkey (2013)
- Akobam ft Medikal and Kofi Mole
- Cold (feat. Sarkodie) (2020)

== Videography ==
Year	Title	Director	Ref
2018	Greetings from abroad. feat. Pappy Kojo	GOLDYUNGE & Himself	
2017	Ranger feat. Darkovibes	Prince Dovlo	
2017	You x Me	Kemist Gold	
2016	89	Wanlov The Kubolor	
2016	Fiend	Kingsley Osei Bonsu	
2016	U x Me	Kemist	
2014	Wave	Prince Dovlo	
2014	Tonga	Vertex	
2013	Cigarette	Desmond Blackmore	
2013	Strawberry Ginger	Gyo	

=== Features ===
- "Medikal" La hustle ft Joey B ( Prod By DJ Krept)
- "Magnom" My Baby ft Joey B (Prod By MagNom)
- "G-West" Akosua ft Joey B (Prod By Kuvie)
- "EL" ft Joey B- You Don't Know Me
- "Mr Eazi" Ft Joey B - Holl'Up (Prod By Juls)
- "Vacs", ft Joey B – Enjoy (Prod. By Vacs)
- " Sarkodie " ft. Joey B -Legend ( Prod. by Nova production)
- "Sarkodie", ft Joey B – Baby Mama (Prod. Ced Solo)
