= Pappy Kojo =

Ghanaian hiphop artist

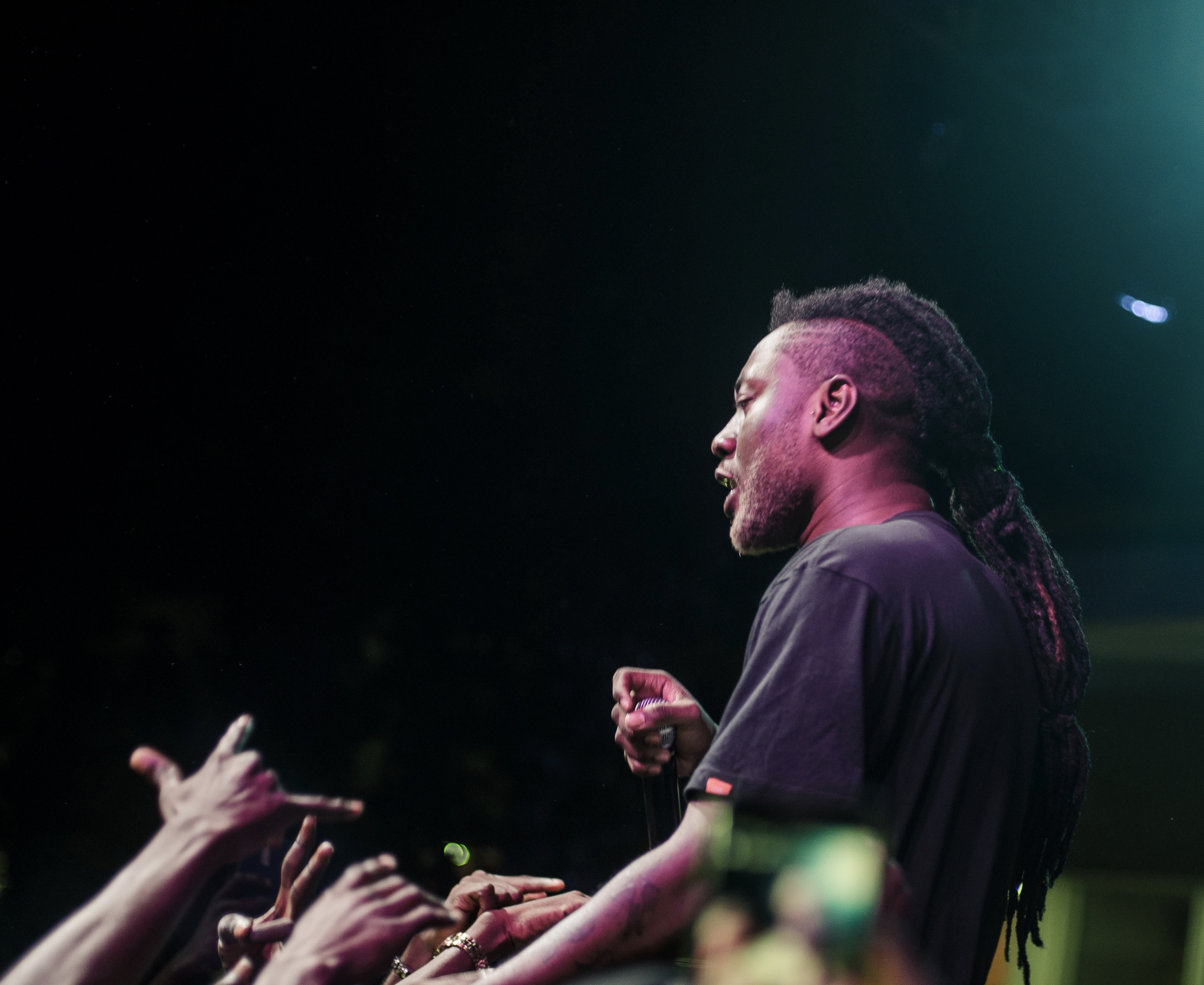
- Pappy Kojo performing at a concert in Accra.

Background information
- Also known as: Fante Van Damme, Realer No, Pappy
- Born: Jason Gaisie; 13 February 1989 (age 37); Takoradi, Ghana
- Genres: Hip hop, hiplife
- Occupation: Rapper
- Years active: (2010-present)

Jason Gaisie (born 13 February 1989), popularly known as Pappy Kojo, is a Ghanaian hip hop and hiplife recording artist from Takoradi. He is well known for his hit single "Realer No".

== Early life and education ==
Jason Gaisie was born on 13 February 1989 to and Rosemond Gaisie. He was born and raised in Takoradi, in the Western Region of Ghana. He attended Ridge International School up until 2004, then went to Italy to be with his mother.

== Music career ==
Pappy Kojo showed his interest and love for music at an early age. He took part in locally organized rap shows where he would rap to Obrafour, Tic Tac, Reggie Rockstone, and Lord Kenya. His biggest musical influences are Obrafour, The Shady Aftermath Camp and Michael Jackson. After leaving Ghana for Italy in 2004, his love for rap music grew even greater. He began covering popular songs and posting them on his YouTube channel.

Around the same time, he began recording his own material with Italian and Ghanaian music producers. This created some buzz for the young rapper. He grew in popularity in the latter part of 2014 when he collaborated on a smash hit record with Ghanaian superstar Joey B.

Pappy then followed with his first official single, "Realer No", also featuring Joey B. He went to South Africa with Joey B to perform at the Big Brother finale.

He was nominated three times at the 2015 Ghana Music Awards and won an award for the Hip-Hop Song of the Year. He has also been nominated for the Best Newcomer in Africa at the AFRIMMA Awards.

He has released three singles since: "Ay3 Late", "2 Raw" (with Edem) and "Deja Vu" (with Jiggy).

=== 2021-present:Logos II ===
On March 12, 2021, Pappy debut studio album Logos II, was released. The albums features various international and local artistes including Sarkodie, Medikal, Fameye, Kwami Eugene, Phyno, Kofi Kinaata, Kwesi Arthur and Busiswa.

== Discography ==
=== Studio albums ===
- Logos II (2021)

=== Major singles ===
- "Realer No" featuring Joey B Produced by Slimbo
- "Ay3late" featuring Sarkodie Produced by Kuvie
- "Green Means Go" featuring RJZ Produced by ALTRA NOVA
- "Awo'a" Produced by Kuvie

== Awards and nominations ==
=== Ghana Music Awards ===
| Year | Recipient/nominated work | Award | Result | Ref. |
|---|---|---|---|---|
| 2015 | Pappy Kojo | Hip Hop Song of the Year 2015 – Realer No f/ Joey B | Won | |
| 2015 | Pappy Kojo | Hip-life/Hip-hop Artiste of the Year 2015 | Nominated | |
| 2015 | Pappy Kojo | Best New Artiste of the Year 2015 | Nominated | |
| 2021 | "Thomas Pompoyeyaw Rmx" | International Collaboration of the Year | Won | |

=== AFRIMMA Awards ===
| Year | Recipient/nominated work | Award | Result | Ref. |
|---|---|---|---|---|
| 2015 | Pappy Kojo | Best newcomer | Nominated | |

=== MTN 4Syte Music Video Awards ===
| Year | Recipient | Award | Ref. |
|---|---|---|---|
| 2015 | Pappy Kojo | Best Hip Hop Video | Nominated |
| 2015 | Pappy Kojo | Most Popular Video | Nominated |
| 2015 | Pappy Kojo | Best New Discovery Video | Nominated |
| 2015 | Pappy Kojo | Best Collaboration Video | Nominated |
| 2017 | Pappy Kojo | Best Photography | Won |
