= Keche =

Ghanaian musical duo

- Origin: Sekondi
- Genres: Afrobeat, Highlife
- Occupation: Musician
- Years active: 2004 - Present
- Members: Joshua Kojo Ampah; Andrew Kofi Cudjoe

Keche (often called The Skill Team) is a Ghanaian musical hip-life duo formed in the year 2004 consisting of Joshua Kojo Ampah and Andrew Kofi Cudjoe. Keche means "skills" in the Akan language. The duo rose to fame with their debut album Pressure (2008). Keche has multiple nominations under their belt and their song Sokode topped several music charts across the African continent.

== Early life ==
In the early part of the year 2000, Joshua took up a hobby of playing basketball and football at St. John Senior Secondary School. This was where he met Andrew, a student and an athlete. Joshua hails from the Central region, while Andrew is from the Western region. They both spoke the native Fante and hence had oral telepathy as they did musical freestyles.

By the year 2005, the duo had recorded several demos and mixtapes in studios like One blaze and Dons mic, all in the Tema Metropolis. Their recording quest drove them to the shores of the Highly Spiritual studio owned by legendary sound engineer Kaywa.

In 2008, Keche released their first single "Omogemi", which was followed by "Ring my bell" which featured Sarkodie.

They are known for the songs Sokode, Aluguntugui, Diabetes, and Pressure, amongst others. In 2011, the duo was recognized as a Global Ambassador for Peace by the then Liberia's president, her Excellency Ellen Johnson Sirleaf. Following that, the group also performed at the UN Peace concert in Monrovia, Liberia in 2014 which gave the group recognition across Africa. In 2019, the group signed a record deal with Gem Rhythms, a subsidiary of Gem Multimedia.

== Discography ==
1. PRESSURE - 2008
2. SOKODE - 2011
3. ALUGUNTUGUI - 2012
4. BODY LOTION - 2013
5. DIABETES - 2014
6. HALLELUJAH - 2014
7. FINEBOY - 2014
8. CASE - 2015
9. MONICA - 2015
10. SHAME ON YOU - 2015
11. ATINKA - 2016
12. COCOA SEASON - 2016
13. NEXT LEVEL - 2017
14. SHOW SOMETHING - 2017
15. THEY SAY - 2018
16. FLAVOR - 2018
17. EXCITING - 2018
18. AKUMA - 2018
19. YOU WAN CRY - 2018
20. GRACE - 2019
21. ODO - 2019
22. TODAY - 2019
23. SAME GIRL - 2020
24. NO DULLING - 2020

== Videography ==
1. OMOGEMI - 2008
2. PRESSURE - 2009
3. SOKODE - 2011
4. ALUGUNTUGUI - 2012
5. DIABETES - 2014
6. CASE - 2015
7. NEXT LEVEL - 2017
8. SHOW SOMETHING - 2017
9. THEY SAY - 2018
10. ODO - 2019
11. TODAY - 2019
12. SAME GIRL - 2020
13. NO DULLING - 2020

== Album ==
1. Pressure

== Gallery ==
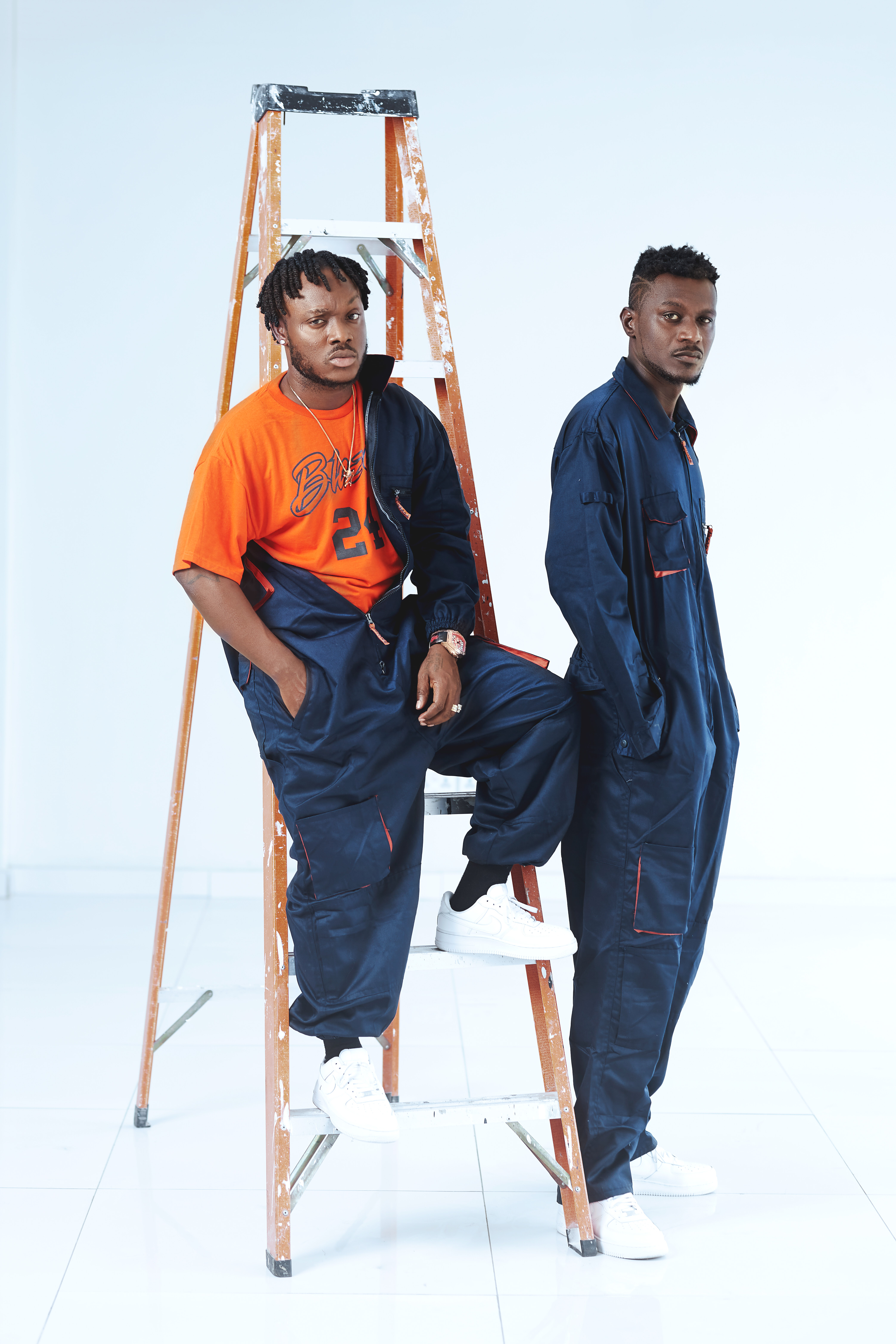
men at work, rebranding kechegh to kecheglobal

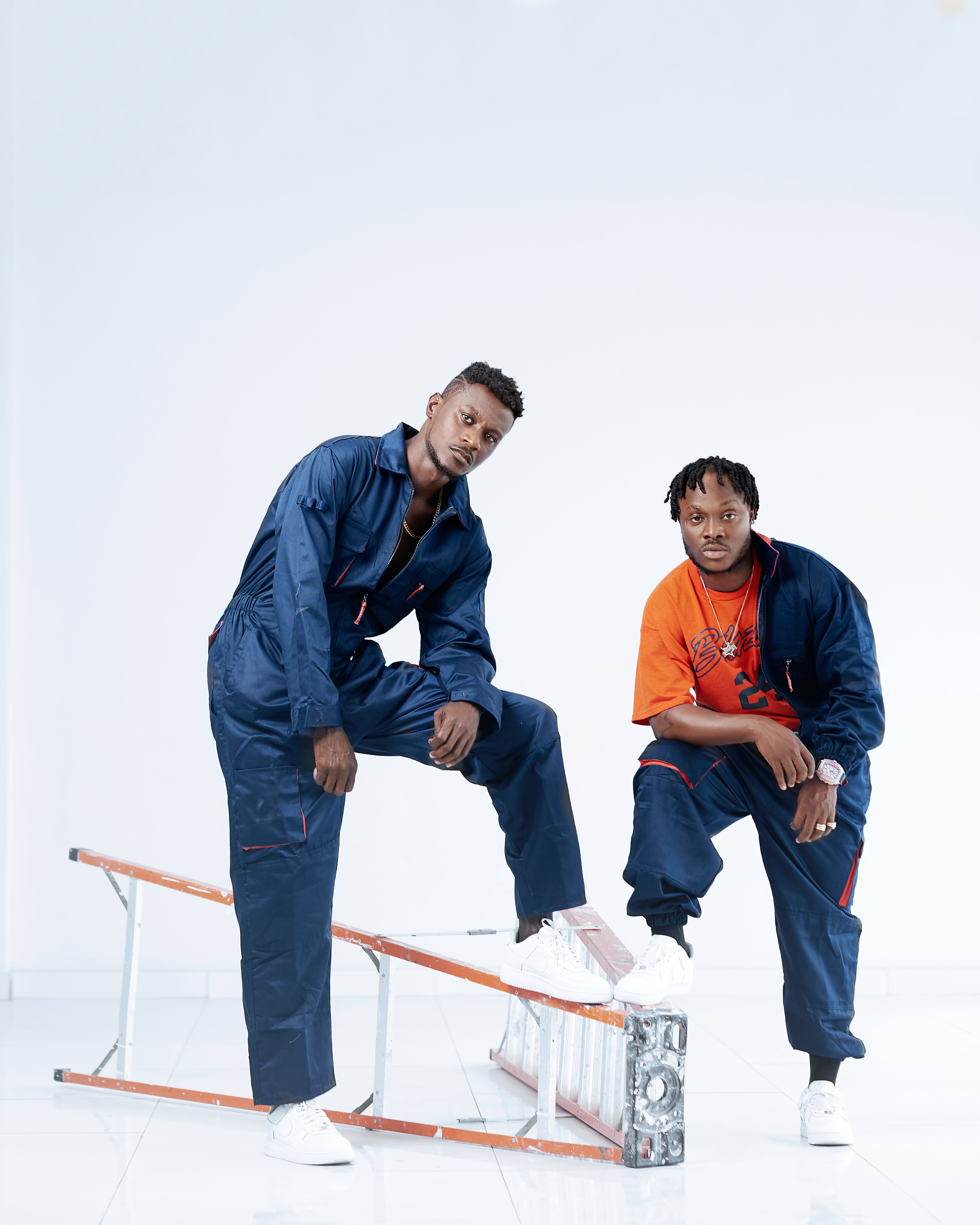
keche depicts, two individuals who connect by music (ladder) to make the magic happen

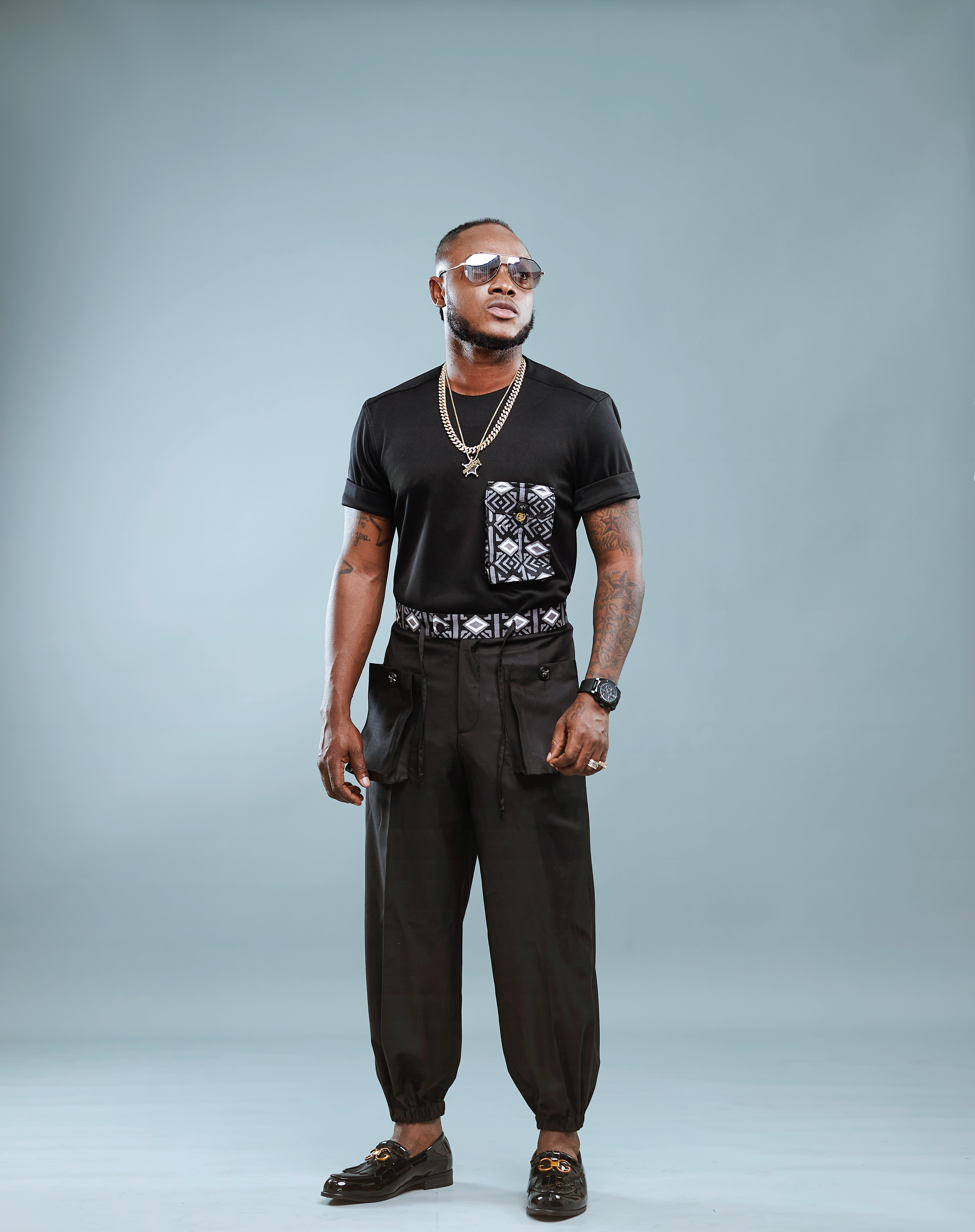
Keche Andrew also known as ''Andrew king'' poses in his urban cross African print outfit

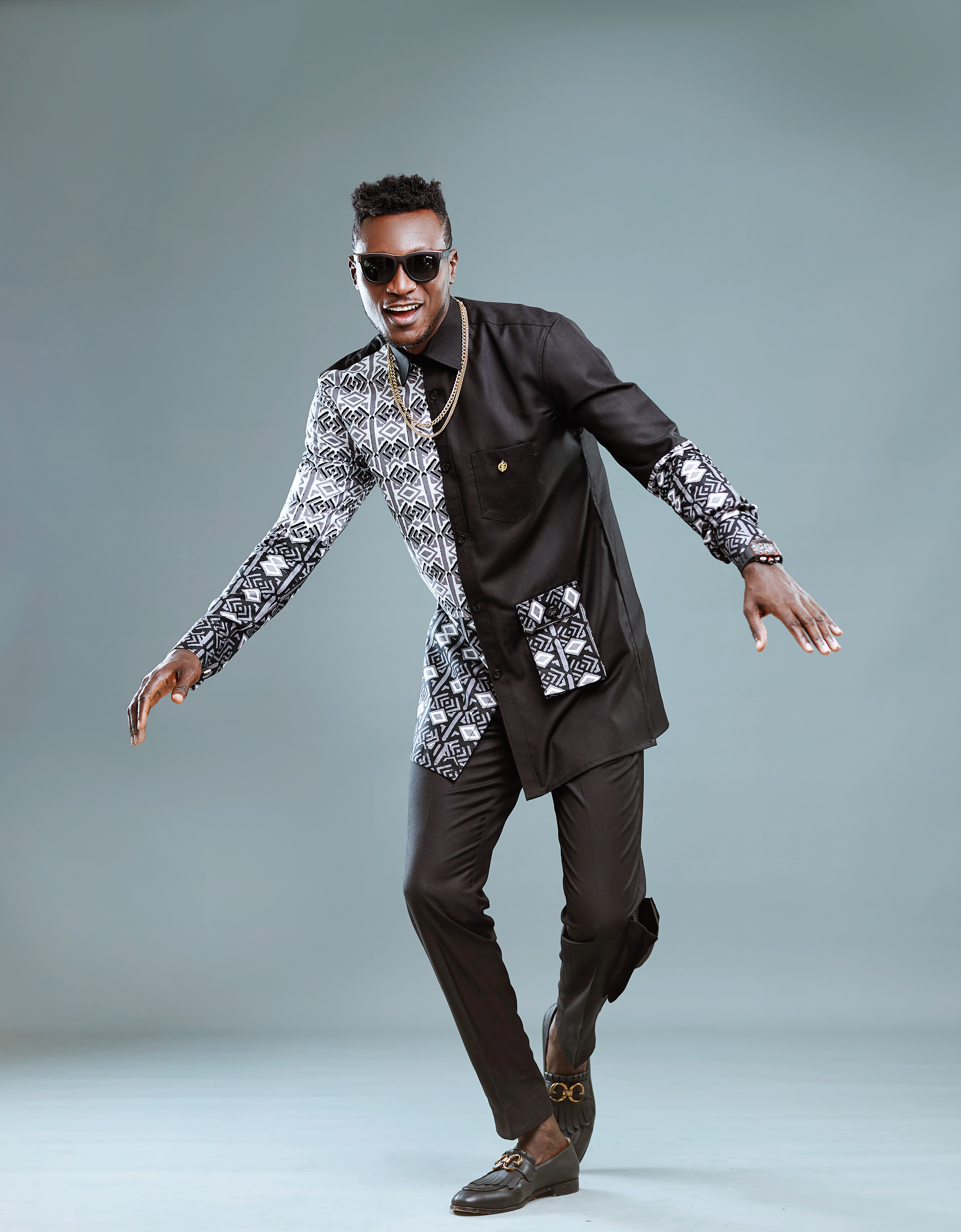
'' I'm going in'' keche Joshua cheerfully poses as he shows of a custom design made crossing both African and Western culture

== Awards ==
- 4syte Music Video Awards 2012 Winner- Best Choreographed Video.
- Liberia's Global Ambassadors for Peace.
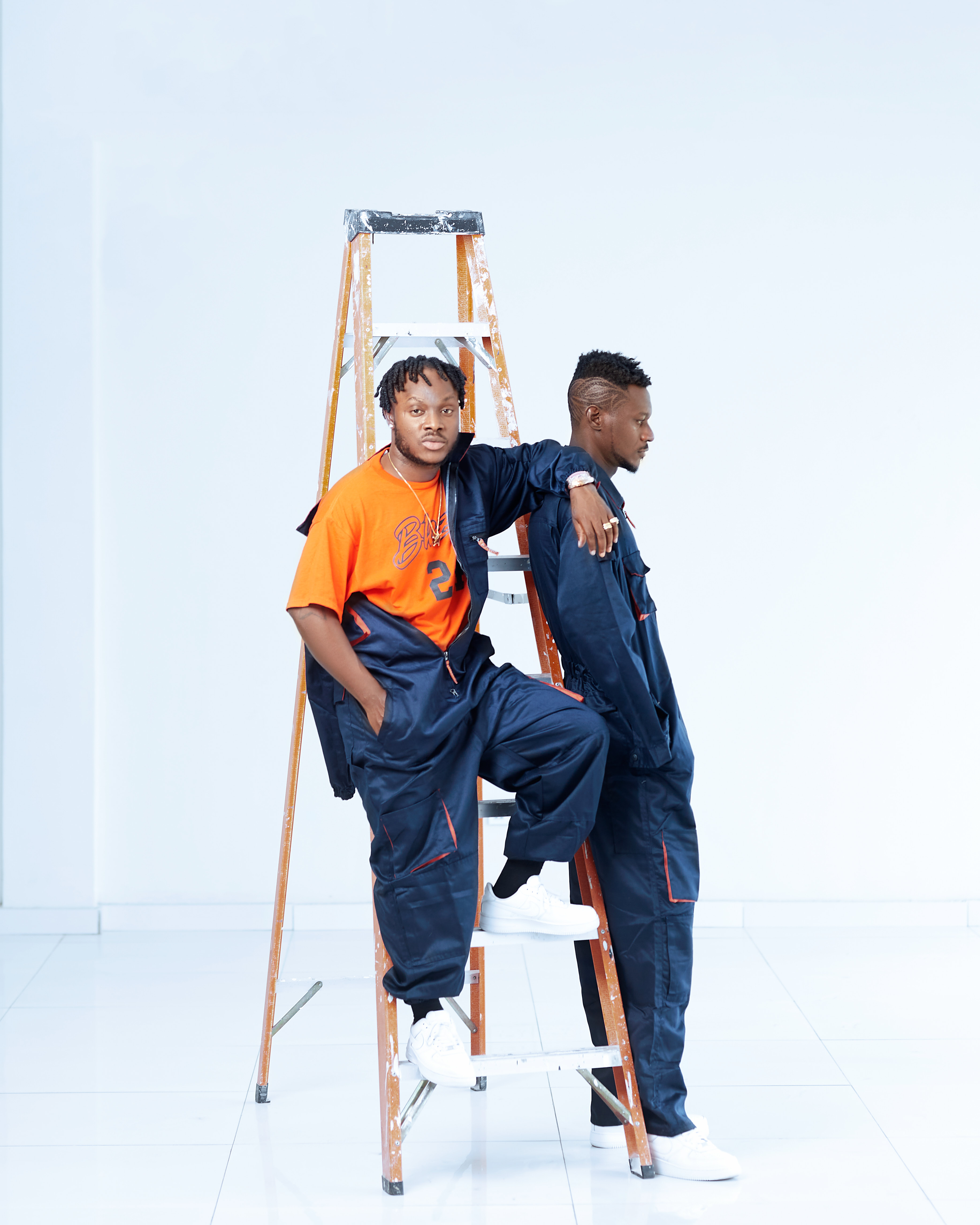
- keche's exclusive photoshoot, where they depict the efforts put into their rebranding
  VGMA 2011 Nominee- Hip Life/Hip Hop Artist of the Year.
- VGMA 2012 Nominee- Best Group, Hip Life Song of the Year, Popular Song of the Year.
- The Pan African International Recognition Awards and Annual Discourse (PAIR-AWARDS)-Best West African Artist of the Year
- 2017 4syte Music Video Awards; Nominations for Best Group of the Year
- 2018 4syte Music Video Awards; Nominations for Most Popular Video.
- 2019 4syte Music Video Awards; Nominations for Best Video.
- 2020 Ghana Music Awards, USA; Winner - Best Group Of The Year.
- 2021 Vodafone Ghana Music Awards, Nominations for Hipife/Hiphop Artist of the Year
- 2021 Vodafone Ghana Music Award; Winner - Best Collaboration
