= Fameye =

Ghanaian rapper and musician (born 1994)

Background information
- Also known as: Fameye, Peter , Bozah
- Born: Peter Famiyeh Bozah; September 11, 1994 (age 32); Bogoso, Ghana
- Origin: Esiama,Nzema, Ghana
- Genres: Afropop, hiplife, highlife
- Occupations: Rapper and musician
- Instrument: Vocals
- Years active: 2015–present
- Website: Fameyeworldwide.com

Peter Famiyeh Bozah (born 11 September 1994), known professionally as Fameye,is a Ghanaian singer, songwriter and rapper. He is known for his storytelling, socially conscious songwriting and a musical style incorporating highlife, hiplife and Afrobeats. . He gained widespread recognition with his 2019 single “Nothing I Get” and has since released several projects. Fameye holds the title of hi-life artiste of the year, as awarded at the recently concluded Telecel Ghana music awards.

== Early life and education ==
Fameye was born in Accra but hails from Bogoso, in the Western Region of Ghana. He attended Odorgonno Senior High School and completed in the year 2013. He was a rapper in his high-school days before switching to the Afro beat genre. Fameye is known for his emotional and introspective lyrics, which often deal with issues concerning love, poverty and self-reflection. He has won several awards, including Songwriter of the year and Hi life artiste of the year.

== Discography ==
Songs	Year
Enkwa	2019
Barman	2019
Sika Duro	2019
Destiny	2019
Nothing I Get	2019
Nothing I Get Remix Ft. Article Wan, Kuami Eugene, Medikal	2019
Mati	2019
Calling (Kwesi Ramos)	2019
Chairman Ft. Joey B	2019
Speed Up (prod by Tom Beatz)	2019
Me Pay Me (Feat Lord Paper)	2020
Praise	2021
Not God	2023
Very Soon	2024
I want	2024
Fortified	2025

== Albums ==
Album name	Year
Songs of Peter	2022
Greater Th>n	2021
Three Times of Peter	2025

=== Songs of Peter ===
The album consists of thirteen songs listed below;

- "Intro" ft. Xorse
- "Menkwa"
- "Big Head"
- "Believe" ft. Amakye The Rapper, Akodaa Seden & Suzzway
- "Everything Now" ft. Kwesi Arthur
- "Music" ft. Akodaa Seden & Amakye The Rapper
- "One Day"
- "Hennessy"
- "Make Am" ft. Pure Akan
- "Thank you"
- "Grace"
- "Ahwehwe" ft. Ofori Amponsah
- "Mogya"

=== Greater Than ===
- "Asem" ft. M.anifest
- "My Lova"
- "247" ft. Kidi
- "Unbreakable" ft. B4bona & amakye the Rapper
- "Fly Away"
- "Agoro"
- "Dey for You"
- "Choices" ft. Pappy Kojo
- "Bii Bi" ft. Bisa Kdei
- "Streets"

== Awards ==
Year	Organization	Award	Nominated work	Result	Ref
2020	WMA	Highlife Artiste of the Year-Fameye	Himself	Won	
2020	WMA	Artiste of the Year- Fameye	Himself	Won	
2020	Vodafone Ghana Music Award	Best New Artiste of the Year	Himself	Won	
2021	Vodafone Ghana Music Award	Hiplife Song of the Year	Long Life	Nominated	
2022	Vodafone Ghana Music Award	Songwriter of the Year	Praise	Won	
