= Yaa Yaa =

Ghanaian singer (born 1990)

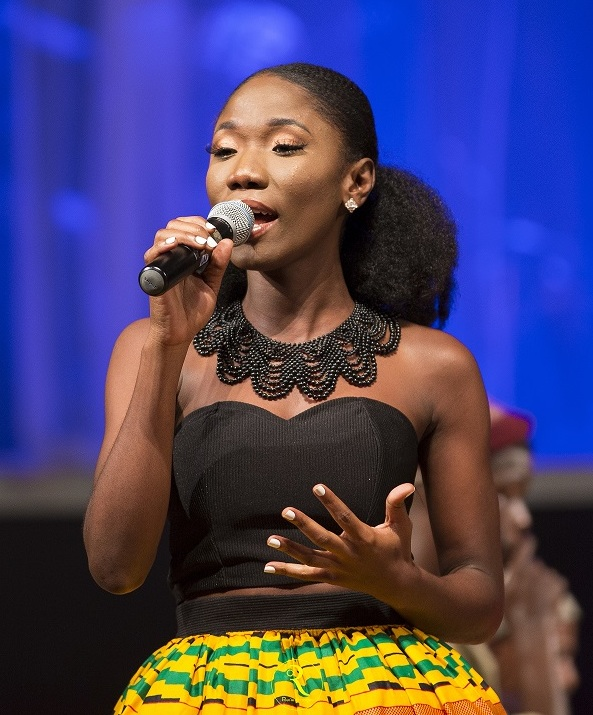
- Yaa Yaa Performing at UMOJA

Background information
- Also known as: Bertha
- Born: Bertha Bridget Kankam; January 25, 1990 (age 36); Kumasi, Ghana
- Genres: Highlife; afro-pop; neo soul; afro-soul; pop; jazz
- Occupations: Singer; songwriter
- Instruments: Vocals; guitar; xylophone
- Years active: 2009–present
- Label: Pyramid Entertainment
- Website: yaayaaworld.com

Bertha Bridget Kankam (born January 25, 1990), better known by her stage name Yaa Yaa, is a Ghanaian singer, songwriter and recording artist. Prior to her current stage name, she performed under her first name, Bertha.

== Early life ==
Bertha Bridget Kankam was born in Kumasi, the capital of the Ashanti region to Ghanaian parents being one of five children. Yaa Yaa lived in Kumasi her entire life until moving to Accra to start her career in the reality television series ‘Stars of the Future’. After successfully completing the ‘Stars of the Future’ series, Yaa Yaa enrolled at University of Ghana, Legon in the School of Performing Arts. She majored in Theatre with a minor in Music.

== Musical career ==
Yaa Yaa started her career as Bertha, auditioning for Stars of the Future in 2009 with Whitney Houston's song "The Greatest Love of All". She and her brother, Kankam, after they both auditioned in Kumasi, Ghana, made it to the semi-finals. Yaa Yaa was picked as one of the final 12, but unfortunately her brother was unable to contest further in the competition. She went on to win the competition. Yaa Yaa considers the win the starting point of her career. One of her prizes of winning ‘Stars of the Future’ was the privilege of being an MTN Ambassador for one year. Her tenure with them was successful and MTN continued to renew her contract consecutively for the next two years following her win. As organizers of the reality television show, Charter House managed Yaa Yaa for two years.

Her first two singles were; ‘Am I' featuring Sarkodie, then ‘Incredible’ written by Chase. She then followed with a feature on a song by Okyeame Kwame "Faithful" which shot her to fame. Afterwards, she remained an independent artist until starting her own label, Pyramid Entertainment, which she currently runs. Her other songs are "Kae", "Dumb Drum" and "Koryor".

Her debut album ''AGOO'' was launched at a private event in Accra in February 2020.

== Artistry ==
Yaa Yaa boasts of a diverse vocal range but settles within the genres of Soul, R&B, and Highlife music. She plays the guitar and xylophone.

Yaa Yaa's music is written and sung in both English and Twi. She admits most of her songs are derived from personal experiences.

Her debut album ''Agoo'' was live studio recorded.

== Influences ==
Yaa Yaa's musical inspiration is derived strongly from Western influences. Her other musical influences are Anita Baker, Brandy, Sade, Aretha Franklin, Aṣa and Whitney Houston. She seeks artists with similar voice textures to hers and gleans from their experiences to enrich her own.

== Discography ==
Year	Title	Production credit	Ref
2015	Am I (feat Sarkodie)	n/a	
2016	Kae	n/a	
2016	Incredible	n/a	
2016	Koryor	n/a	
2017	Dumb Drum	Yaa Yaa	
2017	Life (feat FanteFante)	n/a	

== Awards and nominations ==
Year	Event	Category	Recipient/Nominated Work	Result	Ref
2016	Vodafone Ghana Music Awards	Record of the Year	Yaa Yaa – Dumb Drum	Nominated	
2016	Vodafone Ghana Music Awards	Best Female Vocal Performance	Yaa Yaa – Dumb Drum	Nominated	
2016	Vodafone Ghana Music Awards	Best Music Video of the Year	Yaa Yaa – Dumb Drum	Nominated	
2021	Vodafone Ghana Music Awards	Record of the Year	Yaa Yaa – Mmusuo	Nominated	
2021	Vodafone Ghana Music Awards	Female Vocalist of the Year	Yaa Yaa – Mmusuo	Nominated	
2021	Vodafone Ghana Music Awards	Music for Good	Yaa Yaa – Mmusuo	Won	
