= Okyeame Kwame =

Ghanaian rapper (born 1976)

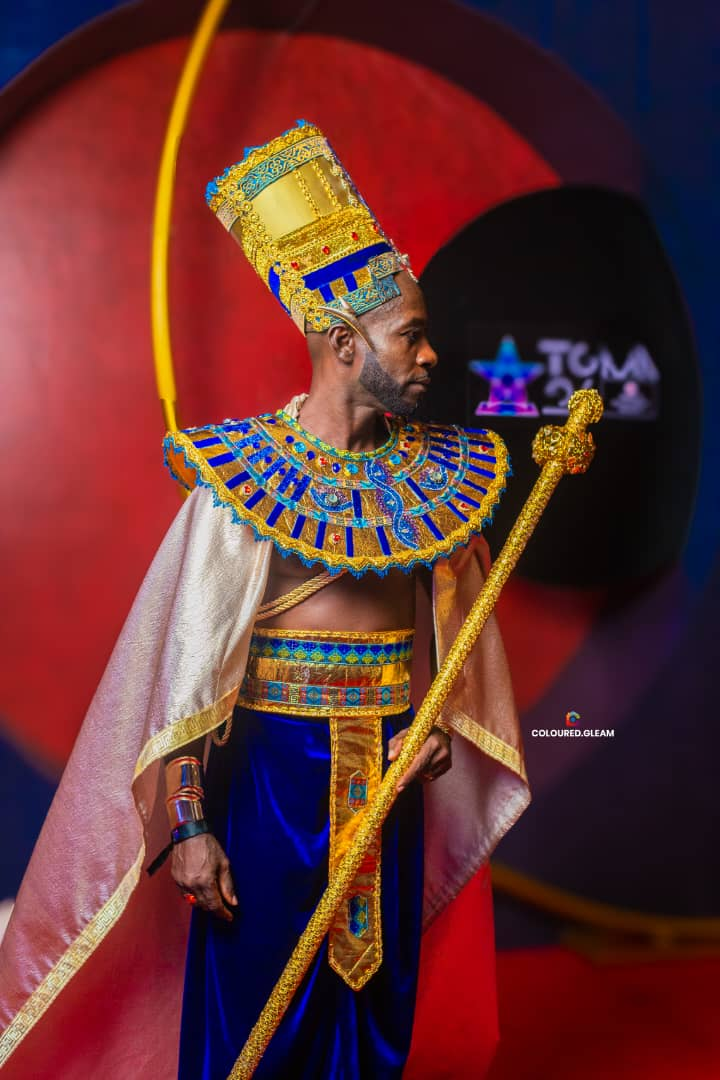
- Okyeame Kwame at the 2025 Ghana Music Awards

Background information
- Also known as: Okyeame Kwame; Rap Doctor
- Born: Kwame Nsiah-Apau; 17 April 1976 (age 50); Kumasi, Ghana
- Education: Kwame Nkrumah University of Science and Technology; University of Ghana
- Genres: Hiplife; hip-hop; Afropop
- Occupations: Singer; songwriter; actor
- Years active: 1997–present
- Spouse: Annica Nsiah-Apau (m. 2009)

Kwame Nsiah-Apau (born 17 April 1976), known by his stage name Okyeame Kwame and nicknamed the Rap Doctor, is a Ghanaian musician, songwriter, creative director, fashion icon, and developmental activist. His dual roles as an artist and an activist have led to his recognition as an "artivist".

== Life and career ==
=== Early life ===
Apau was born on 17 April 1976 in Kumasi, Ashanti Region of Ghana. He is the third of six siblings. His two younger brothers, Kwaku Nsiah Boamah, nicknamed "Flowking Stone", and Kwaku Nsiah Amankwah, nicknamed "Kunta Kinte", also perform as a duo under the name "Bradez".

As he was growing up, Kwame's parents expected him to become a physician, but he gained an interest in rap music from a very young age, writing his own songs and performing at local shows since his days at the Anglican Senior High School in Kumasi. His primary education was difficult because he suffered from dyslexia, which posed challenges for him in reading and writing. Based on his childhood experiences, he has actively promoted the inclusion of dyslexia management in the school curriculum in Ghana.

== Tertiary education ==
Kwame is a product of Kwame Nkrumah University of Science and Technology, where he studied Akan and Sociology for his first degree, with formal education in music under the tutelage of Dr Daniel Amponsah, aka Agya Koo Nimo. Nimo taught him Classical Guitar and Philosophy in African Music.

Subsequently, Kwame enrolled at the University of Ghana and graduated in 2016 with a master's degree in Strategic Marketing.

He is an associate co-opted member of the Chartered Institute of Marketing Ghana in recognition of his professional use of marketing in creative arts.

In March 2024, Kwame and his wife, Annica Nsia-Apau, graduated from the Institute of Paralegal Training and Leadership Studies (IPSL) with master's degrees in Alternative Dispute Resolution. This marks the second master's degree Kwame has earned.

=== Music career ===
In 1997, Kwame achieved notoriety as a member of the "Akyeame" hiplife duo, together with fellow Ghanaian Daniel Kofi Amoateng (under the stage name Okyeame Kofi). They recorded the albums Nyansapo ("Witty Knot", 1997), Nkonsonkonson ("Shackles", 1998), Ntoaso ("Continuity", 2000) and Apam Foforo ("New Testament", 2002). He performed a solo under his own record label One Mic Entertainment, after they parted in 2004. He also featured some renowned Ghanaian highlife and hiplife artists such as Daddy Lumba, Kojo Antwi and Ofori Amponsah.

For declaring himself B.R.A (Best Rapper Alive) in a song he recorded after winning the Ghana Music Awards Artist of the Year award in 2009, Kwame sparked a conflict with fellow Ghanaian rapper Obrafour, who saw himself as more deserving. This resulted in one of the most memorable feuds the Ghanaian music scene has seen, with Obrafour challenging Kwame to a rap battle on the streets, which was never honoured. In 2011, after Obrafour apologized for his actions, Kwame explained he had declined Obrafour's challenge because there was no need for it at the time, since winning Artist of the Year was enough.

Kwame has made significant contributions to education and scholarship promotion. His rap lyrics (which incorporate didactic themes, social consciousness and poetry) are studied in some Ghanaian universities.

He is an advocate for the incorporation of researchers into the music industry to provide expert perspectives and data within the field.

=== Style ===
Most of Kwame's raps and songs are performed in the Twi dialect of Ghana's Akan language. However, he also performs songs in English. His stage name "Okyeame", chosen to reflect his lyrical fluidity, means "linguist (of the royal court)" in his native Akan.

His ability to also perform in other genres, including hip-hop, reggae, highlife, R&B, and jazz, has garnered him the title "Mr. Versatile".

=== Significant music events ===
Aside from musical performances, Kwame launched The Versatile Show in 2012, produced by himself and performed biannually at the National Theatre. He incorporates poetry, drama, and music in this theatrical production.

In 2016, Kwame and his wife began the event "Flaunt Your Lover". Its purpose was to provide a platform for couples to come together and celebrate love.

== Other events ==
Since 2019, Kwame has been organizing the Hiplife Party, an annual event with the objective of evoking nostalgia and preserving hiplife heritage.

Ok Stripped was begun in 2016 as a fundraising initiative for the Ghana Paralympic Team and to support his hepatitis B vaccination programme.

=== Business career ===
Kwame runs his own record label, OK Music, previously One Mic Entertainment and the defunct Firm Bridges Communications, co-founded with his wife,. The label has overseen the production and management of artists such as Morris Devoice, Rex Omar, Bradez, Tattoo, Ben Brako, Kofi B, and other music talents in Ghana.

He is also a partner in the shoe manufacturing company Horseman Shoes, and a partner in Sante's Hair for Kids, which produces local hair products for kids, with his daughter as brand ambassador.

In May 2021, Kwame and his wife launched two guide books to healthy relationships, Finding a Lasting Love Relationship and Maintaining a Lasting Love Relationship, under the Love Locked Down series.

In 2023, Kwame launched his own line of boxer shorts under the brand name Love Equation. He also operates a travel and tour company, OK World Travel and Tour, which helps locals secure job opportunities abroad. Additionally, the company facilitates visits by Africans in the diaspora, offering them the chance to explore Ghana, reconnect with their roots, discover investment opportunities, and experience the richness of the country's culture and heritage.

== Tourism ==
In 2023, Kwame was bestowed with a national award by the Ministry of Tourism, Arts, and Culture for his contributions to the tourism industry. His Made in Ghana album, a collaborative effort with the Ghana Tourism Authority in 2019, was an initiative aimed at fostering a sense of nationalism and promoting tourism.

He has collaborated with Adansi Travel and Tour in a bid to enrich local and international tours, with a special focus on families.

On his 47th birthday in 2023, Kwame unveiled his merchandise boxer shorts label named Love Equation.

== Corporate associations ==
Due to his notoriety as a national icon in his native Ghana, Kwame has become an iconic figure for corporate Ghana. He is a brand ambassador for MTN Group, GT Bank and Coca-Cola in Ghana. He was the public relations officer of the Musicians Union of Ghana (MUSIGA) from 2012 to 2013 and of Ghana Music Rights Organization in 2014.

Kwame was chosen as the ambassador for the "My African Union, My Voice" campaign in 2015, which was launched by the African Union in Addis Ababa as part of the "State of the Union" (SoTU) project, which is currently being carried out in several African nations, including Ghana. The campaign intends to raise public awareness of the African Union's goals and encourage active citizen participation in the Union's member states' execution of its protocols, conventions, and policy choices.

In the same year, he was appointed ambassador for the Junior Boys Mentoring Conference, a youth-focused non-governmental initiative in Accra, which seeks to equip young people with the knowledge and skills that will enable them to tackle challenges as they come into contact with the outside world.

Kwame collaborated with MDS Lancet Laboratories on his Hepatitis B project, vaccinating more than 10,000 Ghanaians. The screening exercise is aimed at creating public awareness about Hepatitis B, which has become rampant among Ghanaians.

Research has shown that insurance penetration has been low in Ghana, partly because a chunk of the population have still not come to terms with the relevance of insurance policies. The need therefore arises for insurance companies to diversify in achieving the intended purpose. To this end, Kwame was appointed by the Insurance Awareness Coordinators Group as an ambassador for its GET INSURED CAMPAIGN project, to encourage Ghanaians to get insured, particularly against hard times.

In 2020, he was appointed ambassador for Technical and Vocational Training, TVET by the Ghana Education Service with the responsibility of promoting the preference of TVET among Ghanaians. He shares the platform with Ghana's first lady Rebecca Akufo-Addo, ace broadcaster Kwami Sefa Kayi, television host Berla Mundi, actress Martha Ankomah, founder and chief executive officer of McDan Group of Companies Daniel McKorley, founder and chief executive officer of Makeup Ghana Rebecca Donkor, and other distinguished men and women in Ghana.

Kwame was designated in 2021 as a climate ambassador by Climate Clock, a global climate initiative, with the purpose of emphasizing the urgency to enhance climate advocacy.

In 2022, Kwame was designated as the brand ambassador for Waylead Ghana Company Limited. He was also appointed as an ambassador by Water Aid for their Hygiene Behaviour Change Coalition (HBCC) as part of the COVID-19 Control initiative.

In 2024, Kwame was named an ambassador for the Earthshot Prize—an environmental initiative inspired by the U.S. "Moonshot" project—designed to inspire and reward innovative solutions to the world’s most pressing environmental challenges over the next decade.

== Discography ==
Kwame released his first solo album, Boshe Ba (Promised Child), in 2004, just after the breakup of the Akyeame band. He followed in 2008 with Manwesem (My Poetry) and in 2011 with The Clinic, launched at the Aphrodisiac nightclub in Accra. In 2012, he launched The Versatile Show ("Konfanko").

In 2020, he teamed up with Jamaica dancehall act Sizzla Kalonji on a song titled "Come Home", which urges Africans in the diaspora to remember to return to their motherland.

== Film and television ==
Kwame has helped to discover native African talents by working as a judge on music reality shows in Ghana. He has also acted in Ghanaian films like Ties That Bind, The Comforter and Amsterdam Diary.

== Personal life ==
Kwame has been married since 2009 to Annica Nsiah-Apau and has two children with her. They are named Sir Kwame Bota and Sante Antwiwaa.

His two younger brothers are also rappers, using the stage names Flowking Stone and Kunta Kinte. The two are collectively known as Bradez. Kwame has one sister.

== Philanthropy ==
He founded the Okyeame Kwame Foundation in 2009, to raise public awareness on hepatitis B and to provide screening, prevention and education to mitigate the disease in Ghana, backed by MTN Ghana and the MDS-Lancet Laboratories. Periodic screening and vaccination campaigns are held throughout Ghana, attended by hundreds of people who receive free vaccines. In 2014, he staged the Celebrity Car Wash, an event including sports, games and photoshoots with celebrities in East Legon, to raise funds in support of his campaign to provide free vaccination to at least 1000 Ghanaians. The foundation initiated and sponsored the construction of a hepatitis B treatment facility in Tamale.

For his work in raising the funds to provide free screening for the Ghanaian urban and rural poor, Kwame has been appointed Hepatitis B Ambassador for the Ghana Health Service.

After being appointed as a Climate Ambassador by Climate Clock, Kwame launched a project to nurture 2000 Climate Champions from senior and junior high schools in the country. The objective is to instill climate consciousness among children, recognizing them as the demographic most affected by environmental changes. The Climate Clock is utilized to explain the concept of climate change to these students, followed by tree planting activities and commitments made by the students to protect the trees. This commitment is then passed on to a successor, emphasizing a shift from merely planting trees to actively growing and safeguarding them as a means of protecting the climate.

== Honours ==
John Cranley, mayor of the city of Cincinnati in Ohio, USA, on 21 November 2016 presented Kwame with a Key to the City and declared 17 November as "Okyeame Kwame Day" to solemnize his status as International Cultural Ambassador to the city.

Kwame was honoured on 3 February 2017 by the Chartered Institute of Marketing Ghana with the status of an associate co-opted member for his professional use of marketing in the creative arts.

At the 2017 Ghana Music Honours, he was given the best video honour for his song "Small Small", which features MzVee. Kwame also received a United States Presidential Volunteer Service Award, which is normally given to Americans, but an exception was made for him, dubbed the Kingdom Humanitarian Award, in recognition of his contributions towards awareness of hepatitis B.

The People's Choice Practitioners Awards, organised by Media Men Ghana in April 2017, saw Kwame receive the "Outstanding Health Ambassador" honours presented to him by the Asantehene, his Majesty Otumfuo Osei Tutu II.

In 2017, Kwame joined David Beckham and Hugh Jackman as UNICEF Super Dad Ambassadors.

In 2024, Kwame attended the Earthshot Prize Awards in South Africa. He wore the Ghanaian traditional cloth 'Kente' at the event.

== Developmental projects ==
Kwame was chosen as the Climate Change Ambassador for the Ghana Dedicated Grant Mechanism (DGM), one of the leading projects of Solidaridad, an international Civil Society Organization. He aims to be a positive voice in reducing the impact of climate change in Africa. Kwame and the DGM Project have visited 52 farming communities in the Brong Ahafo and the Western Regions of Ghana, to discuss climate-smart activities and positive land use practices.

The Okyeame Kwame Foundation has embarked on a hepatitis B vaccination project since 2009, to help end the issue of Hepatitis B, which was at its peak in Ghana. Since then, the foundation has screened over 10,000 people and vaccinated some 5,000 more for free.

His latest album, Made in Ghana, which features some of Ghana's most sensational artists, including KiDi and Kuami Eugene, has renewed calls for Ghanaians to feel proud of who they are and to patronize goods made in Ghana in order to promote national identity. Kwame's dress style, which is often influenced by his root culture, Asante, has influenced many youth in Ghana who now prefer making up unique styles with African prints than other prints. Following the launch of the Made in Ghana album and the concept it portrays, the Ministry of Trade and Industry appointed Kwame as ambassador for the "Made in Ghana" campaign of the Ministry. Kwame later extended his campaign to the Tourism Ministry where he interacted with the Tourism Minister, Catherine Afeku, to encourage Ghanaians to purchase goods and services which are made in Ghana.

Kwame is a board member of World Reader, a non-profit organization that delivers e-books to people in the developing world. The organization uses e-readers, mobile phones and other digital technology to provide readers in 53 countries with a digital library of more than 45,000 book titles. They also build solar panels for areas without electricity so they can read through digital means.

Kwame was appointed as an EnABLE ambassador, in partnership with the World Bank, Solidaridad, REDD+, the Forestry Commission, and Tropenbos. The Enhancing Access to Benefits while Lowering Emissions (EnABLE) project in Ghana is designed to complement the Emissions Reduction Programme by providing direct support to groups or communities that are either excluded or at risk of being excluded from the distribution of carbon and non-carbon benefits. Under the REDD+ project, about 50 million dollars will be generated in communities that practice sustainable land use aimed at increasing carbon accumulation within the cocoa landscape.

After being made Ambassador for Earthshot Prize, he attended the 2024 Earthshot Prize ceremony, which was held on 6 November 2024 in South Africa where he met with the Prince of Wales, Prince William. The awards was aimed at celebrating people who provide innovative solutions for climate and environmental issues.

== Controversies ==
In 2020, Kwame initiated legal proceedings against highlife legend Gyedu-Blay Ambolley. The legal action was prompted by allegations that Bice "Obour" Osei Kuffuor, former president of the Musicians Union of Ghana (MUSIGA), had given Kwame and other associates GHS 50,000 each from the GHS 2 million fiscal budget allocated to the union by the government in 2012. The dispute, spanning three years, underwent arbitration, and the court endorsed the resolution that Ambolley should retract his statement and issue an apology to Kwame for what was deemed an untrue statement.

Kwame stirred controversy by revealing his adoption of a vegan lifestyle since 2021. His reasoning was rooted in the belief that animals, akin to humans, experience emotions and pain, leading him to resist contributing to the suffering of living beings by consuming them as food. This announcement faced significant criticism from a segment of the Ghanaian population on social media, generating diverse opinions in response to Kwame's perspective. Despite the backlash, he persistently emphasizes his deepened understanding and empathy for the pain animals endure. He argues that plant-based sources offer sufficient protein, questioning the necessity of killing animals for meat consumption. He explains that he follows a vegan lifestyle for ethical and environmental reasons.

During the controversial OccupyJulorbihouse protest organized by a group called Democracy Hub to address increased hardships and economic challenges, Kwame faced criticism on social media for not participating in the event. The protest, also known as the "occupy the thieves' house" protest, resulted in online trolling of Kwame after he suggested that individuals should take personal responsibility to fix the country rather than solely relying on government intervention. This response followed a Twitter (X) post by popular television host Naa Ashorkorr, who questioned who should be accountable for fixing the country. Kwame's comment garnered harsh remarks from some Ghanaians who interpreted it as opposing the protest. However, Kwame has maintained that the name of the protest smacks of disrespect to the elderly, leading to his dissociation from it.

Following the launch of his boxer brand, Kwame attracted attention on social media by posting pictures of himself in the boxers as part of the brand promotion. Some Ghanaians, including politicians like Abraham Amaliba from the National Democratic Congress, criticized him for what they perceived as indecent exposure. Amaliba suggested that Kwame should be taken to court for indecent exposure. In response, Kwame explained that the images were part of an advertisement for his boxer brand, humorously questioning whether he should have worn kente (traditional woven fabric) to cover up in the promotional photos.

== Politics ==
Ahead of the 2024 elections in Ghana, Kwame was approached by Alan Kyerematen, presidential aspirant for the Movement for Change, to serve as his running mate. However, Kwame declined the offer, citing his apolitical stance. He also turned down a similar offer from the flagbearer of the New Patriotic Party, Dr Mahamudu Bawumia, to join his campaign team.

== Awards and nominations ==
Year	Organization	Award	Work	Result
1999	Ghana Music Awards	Hiplife Song of the Year (as part of Akyeame)	Mesan Aba ft. Nana Quame, Mary Agyepong & Yoggi Doggi	Won
1999	Ghana Music Awards	Artist of the Year (as part of Akyeame)	N/A	Nominated
1999	Ghana Music Awards	Song of the Year (as part of Akyeame)	Mesan Aba ft. Nana Quame, Mary Agyepong & Yoggi Doggi	Nominated
1999	Ghana Music Awards	Video of the Year (as part of Akyeame)	Mesan Aba ft. Nana Quame, Mary Agyepong & Yoggi Doggi	Nominated
2004	Ghana Music Awards	Best Collaboration (Okyeame Kwame / Daasebre Dwamena)	Kokoko	Nominated
2009	Ghana Music Awards	Artist of the Year	N/A	Won
2009	Ghana Music Awards	Hip Hop Song of the Year	Woso	Won
2009	Ghana Music Awards	Hiplife Artist of the Year	N/A	Won
2009	Ghana Music Awards	Hip Hop Artist of the Year	N/A	Won
2009	Ghana Music Awards	Best Music Video of the Year	Woso	Won
2009	Channel O Music Video Awards	Most Talented West African Artist	N/A	Nominated
2009	Channel O Music Video Awards	Most Talented Young Artist	N/A	Nominated
2009	Channel O Music Video Awards	Most Talented Hip-hop Video	Woso	Nominated
2009	Channel O Music Video Awards	Most Talented Video of the Year	Woso	Nominated
2009	Africa Music Awards (UK)	Best West African Artist	N/A	Nominated
2009	Africa Music Awards (UK)	Best African Video	Woso	Nominated
2009	Africa Music Awards (UK)	Best Song	Woso	Nominated
2009	Sun City Music Video Awards	Best African Video	Woso	Nominated
2010	Ghana Music Awards	Best Collaboration	The Game	Nominated
2010	4syte Music Video Awards	Best Edited Video	Woso	Won
2011	Ghana Movie Awards	Best Cameo Appearance	Ties That Bind	Nominated
2012	Ghana Music Awards	Songwriter of the Year	Faithful	Won
2012	Ghana Music Awards	Best Collaboration of the Year	Faithful	Won
2012	Ghana Music Awards	Record of the Year	Faithful	Nominated
2012	Ghana Music Awards	Best Hiplife / Hip-hop Artist	N/A	Nominated
2012	Ghana Music Awards	Artist of the Year	N/A	Nominated
2012	Ghana Music Awards	Hiplife Song of the Year	Faithful	Nominated
2012	Ghana Music Awards	Best Music Video of the Year	Faithful / Ohene Media	Nominated
2012	Ghana Music Awards	Most Popular Song of the Year	Faithful	Nominated
2012	Ghana Music Awards	Best Rapper of the Year	N/A	Nominated
2012	4syte Music Video Awards	Best Hi-Life Video	Sika	Won
2013	Ghana Music Awards	Songwriter of the Year	Sika	Won
2013	Ghana Music Awards	Best Rapper of the Year	N/A	Nominated
2013	Ghana Music Awards	Best Collaboration of the Year	N/A	Nominated
2013	Ghana Music Awards	Album of the Year	N/A	Nominated
2013	4syte Music Video Awards	Best Hiplife Video	Sika	Won
2014	Ghana Music Honours	Hiplife Legend	N/A	Won
2015	MOGO Awards	Artist of the Year	N/A	Won
2016	All Africa Music Awards	Best Male Artiste in West Africa	Small Small	Nominated
2016	All Africa Music Awards	Songwriter of the Year	Small Small	Nominated
2016	All Africa Music Awards	Best African Collaboration	Small Small	Nominated
2016	All Africa Music Awards	Song of the Year in Africa	Small Small	Nominated
2016	All Africa Music Awards	Best Artiste	Small Small	Nominated
2017	People's Choice Practitioners Honours	Health Ambassador of the Year	Hepatitis B project	Won
2017	United States Presidential Volunteer Service Award	Kingdom Humanitarian of the year	Hepatitis B project	Won
2017	Ghana Music Awards	Best Video of the Year	Small Small	Won
2017	People's Choice Practitioners Awards	Outstanding Health Ambassador’ honor	Hepatitis B project	Won
2017	Glitz Style Awards	Most Stylish Artiste of the Year	N/A	Won
2017	Interkulterelle Migraten Integrations Centre (IMIC), Germany	Pan-Africanism Awards	N/A	Won
2017	Central Region Music Awards	Ayekoo Award	N/A	Won
2017	United States Presidential Volunteer Service Award	Highest Civilian Honour	Hepatitis B project	Won
2018	Canadian Government Awards	Reading Ambassador	N/A	Won
2019	Highlife Music Awards	Highlife Music ‘Big Band of the Year’	Made in Ghana	Won
2020	Vodafone Ghana Music Awards	Record of the Year	Bolgatanga girl ft. Abiana x Atongo Zimba	Won
2021	Vodafone Ghana Music Awards	Best Video of the Year	Kpa'	Nominated
2022	Vodafone Ghana Music Awards	Best Hiplife Song of the Year	Yeeko	Won
2024	Telecel Ghana Music Awards	Hiplife Song of the Year	Insha Allah	Nominated
2018	National Philanthropy Excellence Awards	Best Video of the Year	Hepatitis B campaign	Won
2023	National Tourism Awards	Artistic Support to Tourism Industry	Made in Ghana campaign	Won
2017	Students Choice Awards	Life Changing Award	Hepatitis B campaign	Won
2023	Humanitarian Global Awards	Climate Change	Climate Change campaign	Won
2024	African Legends Night	Legends Hall of Fame	Contribution to Ghanaian	Won
2022	Home Builders Africa Awards	Wellness Influencer of the year	Hepatitis B	Won
