= Adina (singer) =

Ghanaian–South African musician

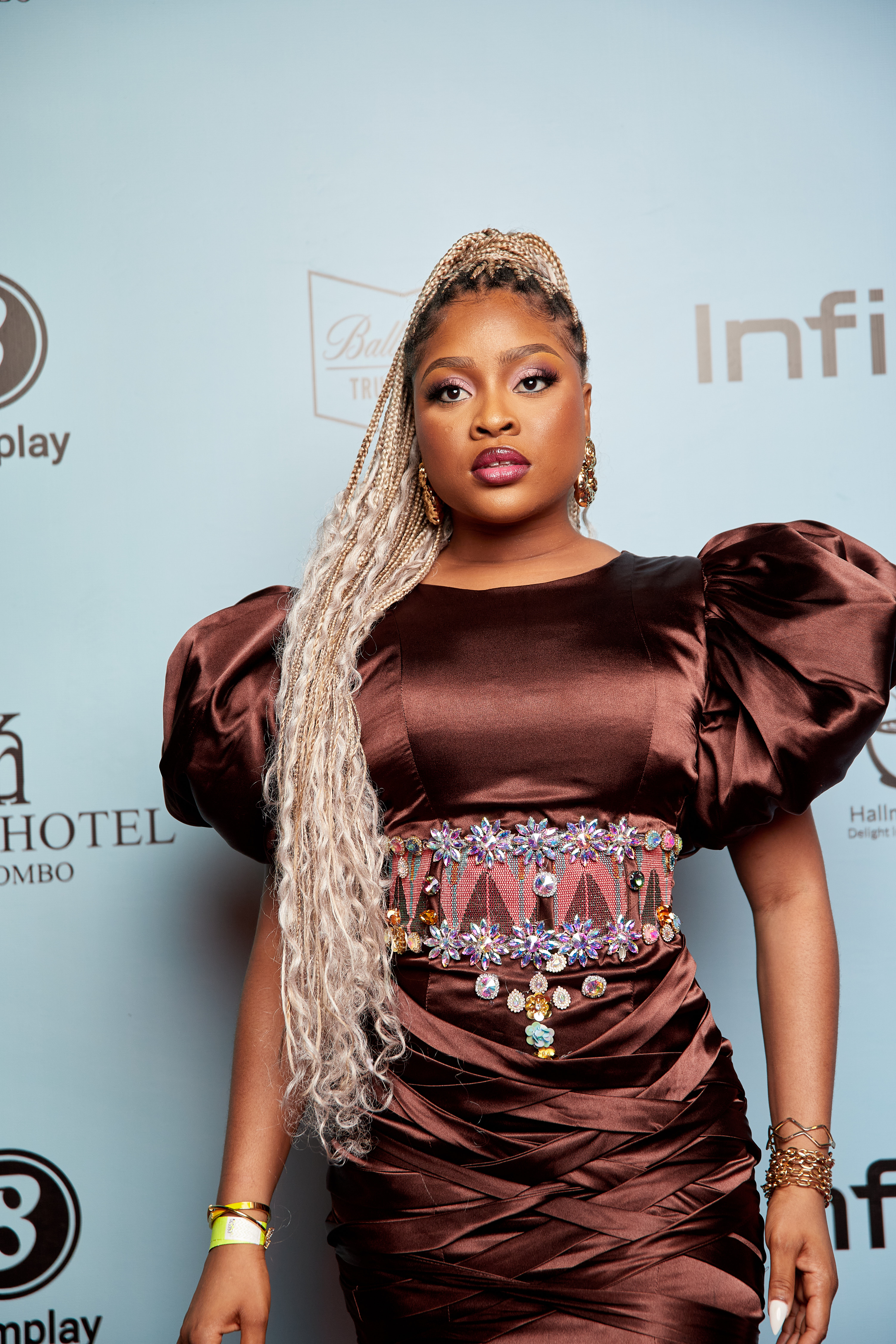

Background information
- Born: Adina Thembi Ndamse; 1989 (age 36–37); Liberia
- Origin: Ghana and South Africa
- Genres: Afropop; Pop; Highlife
- Occupations: Singer; Model; Songwriter; actress; performer
- Years active: 2008–present
- Label: New African Movement

Adina Thembi Ndamse (born 3 October 1989) better known by her stage name Adina is a Ghanaian-South African singer, songwriter, actress and a model. She was the winner of music reality show Stars of the Future in 2008. Her eighth music single titled "Too Late" won her two awards – Record of the Year and Best Female Vocalist of the Year at the 2018 Vodafone Ghana Music Awards. In March 2021, she was among the Top 30 Most Influential Women in Music by the 3Music Awards Women's Brunch. Her masterpiece Araba was adjudged the winner of Album of the year at the 22nd Vodafone Ghana Music Awards (VGMAs). Adina is also one of the most awarded female artists from the Ghana music awards. She has collaborated with artists including Sarkodie, Teephlow, Stonebwoy, Kuame Eugene, DJ Shiwaawa, Kofi Kinaata, Kidi.

== Early life and career ==
Adina started singing when she was a young girl. She had her senior high school education at the Wesley Girls High School and then moved to Central University where she obtained a degree in Environmental and Development Studies. Growing up as a kid she joined the National Theater Choir where she got to perform at Kidafest and Fun World shows.

She shot to prominence in the Ghana music scene when she competed in the music reality show 'Stars of the Future' organized by Charter House Ghana and eventually became the winner. She was 19 years old when won stars of the future show. She performed online concerts during the COVID-19 lock down.

=== Fashion ===
Adina also owns a fashion brand called Thembi Republic. In 2013, she was also made a brand ambassador to the fashion brand AfroMod Trends.

== Personal life ==
Adina's parents are Richard Sekumbuzo Ndamse, a South African doctor, and Ghanaian mother, Mercy Ndamse.

=== Surviving fibroids ===
Adina underwent surgery in 2021 to remove 16 uterine fibroids, an experience she described as scary. Following her diagnosis, Adina decided to use her platform to create awareness on fibroids, which included hosting a concert.

== Awards and nominations ==
=== Ghana Music Awards ===
Year	Nominee / work	Award	Result
2021	Herself	Artiste of the Year	Nominated
2021	Araba	Album of the Year	Won
2021	Herself	Best Afrobeats/Afropop Artiste of the Year	Nominated
2021	Take care of you ft Stonebwoy	Collaboration of the Year	Nominated
2021	Hear me	Best Female Vocal Performance of the Year	Nominated
2021	Daddy's Little girl	Record of the Year	Won
2021	Adina-Hyedin	Songwriter of the Year	Nominated
2021	Why	Best Music Song of the Year	Nominated
2021	Take care of you ft. Stonebwoy	Best Afrobeats/Afropop Song of the Year	Nominated
2021	Why	Best Reggae Dancehall Song of the Year	Won
2020	Herself	Record of the Year	Nominated
2018	Herself	Best Female Vocalist of the Year	Won
2017	Herself	Afropop Song of the Year	Won
2017	Herself	Best Female Vocalist	Won
2016	Herself	Record of the Year	Nominated
2016	Herself	Afropop Song of the Year	Nominated
2016	Herself	Best Female Vocalist of Year	Nominated

=== Entertainment Achievement Awards ===
In March 2021, she was awarded the 'Best Female Artiste' of the Year category in the Entertainment Achievement Awards.

=== 3Music Awards ===
In March 2021, her song WHY was the Reggae Dancehall Song of the Year in the 3Music Awards.

=== Vodafone Ghana Music Awards ===
Year	Award	Work	Result
2021	Best Reggae/Dancehall Artiste of the Year	Why	Won
2021	Female Vocalist of the Year	Hear Me	Nominated
