= Joe Mettle =

Ghanaian gospel musician (born 1981)

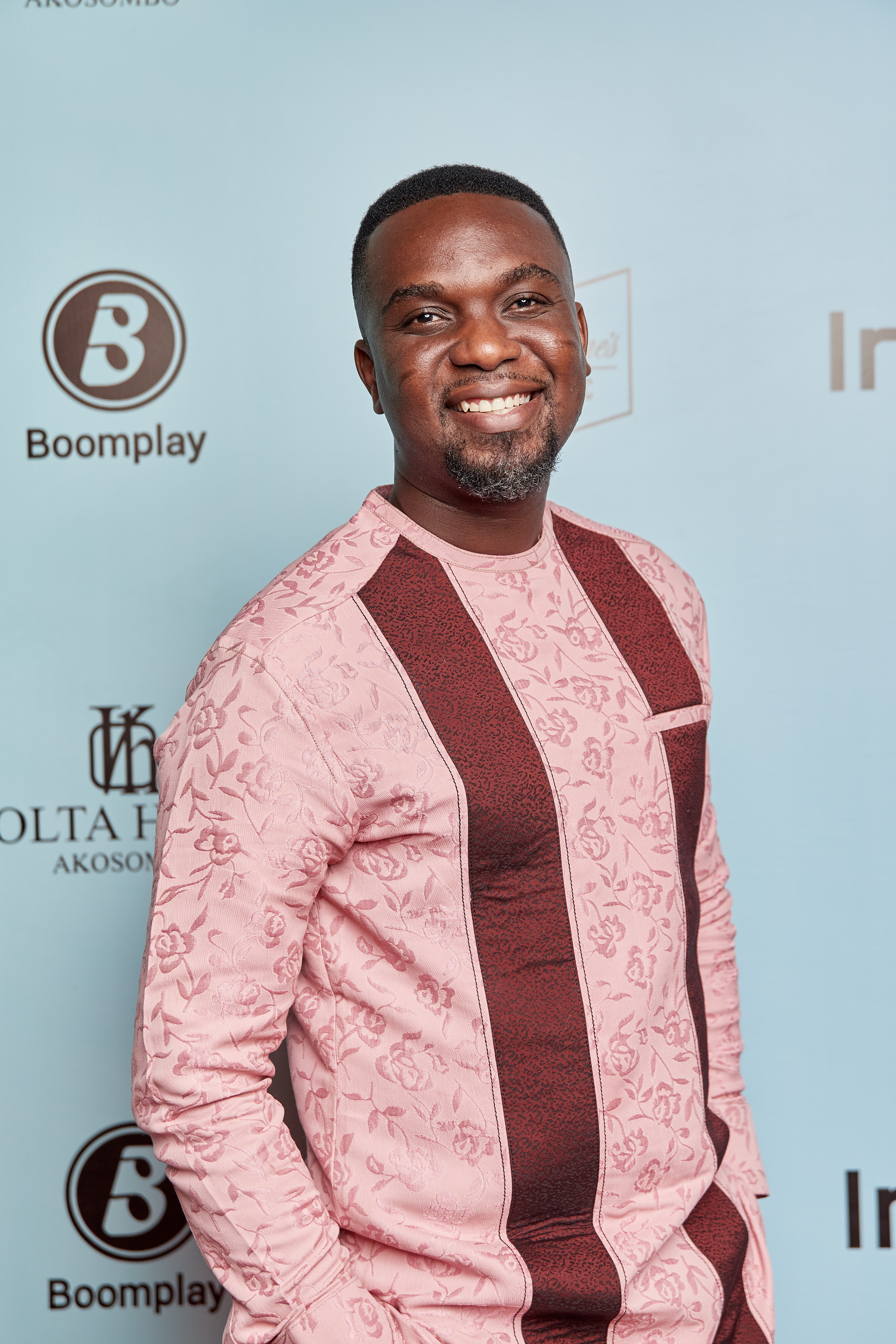

Background information
- Also known as: Joe Mettle
- Born: Joseph Oscar Nii Armah Mettle; 5 July 1981 (age 45); Accra, Ghana
- Genres: Gospel, Urban contemporary gospel
- Occupations: Singer, songwriter, preacher
- Instrument: Vocals
- Years active: (2011–present)

Joseph Oscar Nii Armah Mettle, recognised by his stage name Joe Mettle, is a Ghanaian gospel musician and songwriter. On 8 April 2017, he became the first Ghanaian gospel musician to win the coveted Artiste of the Year award at the 2017 Ghana Music Awards. He has won many awards in Ghana and beyond, and has performed on international stages with international gospel artistes like Donnie McClurkin, Nathaniel Bassey, Ntokozo Mbambo, Michael Stuckey and many more. He is married to Selassie Mettle (née Dzisa).

== Early life and education ==
Joe is a marketer by profession and a worshiper by calling. He was born to Florence Addo and Emmanuel Mettle and is the eldest of six children. Joe started his education at the Richard Akwei Memorial School and later moved to Kade 1&2 Primary School (Kade) where he spent about a year before returning to Accra, attending St. Michael's and All Angels School. He continued to Korle Gonno 3 Junior High School (JHS) and obtained his Senior High School Certificate from His Majesty Academy. Joe Mettle is an alumnus of Accra Academy. Prior to His Majesty Academy, he studied draftsmanship at the Modern School of Draftsmanship (MODESCO). He then attended Pentecost University College, a private Christian university college located at Sowutuom in Accra.

== Music career ==
During his early days of singing, he worked as a backing vocalist for some Ghanaian Gospel greats including Cindy Thompson, the late Danny Nettey, and Reverend Tom Bright Davies. Joe Mettle was the lead singer for the indigenous multicultural music group, Soul Winners. He won the Artiste of the Year, Gospel Artiste of the Year and the Male Vocalist Artiste of the Year at the 2017 Vodafone Ghana Music Awards (VGMA). His award for Artiste of the Year was considered historical as he was the first Gospel artiste to win in this category since the conception of these awards. Joe has also won over 10 local and international awards. He has won several awards at Africa Gospel Music Awards, Gospel industry Awards, African Gospel Awards (UK), CCML Ghana Gospel Awards, Bass Awards and RIGA Awards (South Africa).

Joe has featured on the popular South African Broadcasting Corporation's TV show titled, "Gospel Classics", which also highlighted Donnie McClurkin. He received the Best Male Gospel Artiste in Africa at the Trumpet Gospel Awards held in South Africa.

He has many nationwide hit songs including "Mehia wo Yesu" (meaning-I need you Jesus), "Nhyira" (meaning-Blessing), "Medɔ Wo", "Akokyem Nyame", "Mensuro" (meaning-I will not fear), "Turning Around" and "Yesu Adi Nkunim" (meaning-Christ is Victorious) to his credit. One of the songs attributed to him that won him nominations at the 2017 VGMA is titled "Ɔnwanwani" (meaning-God of Wonders). He has six albums to his credit.

In June 2025, Mettle released a reggae-gospel single titled "Grateful", a Thanksgiving anthem launched ahead of his annual Praise Reloaded concert.

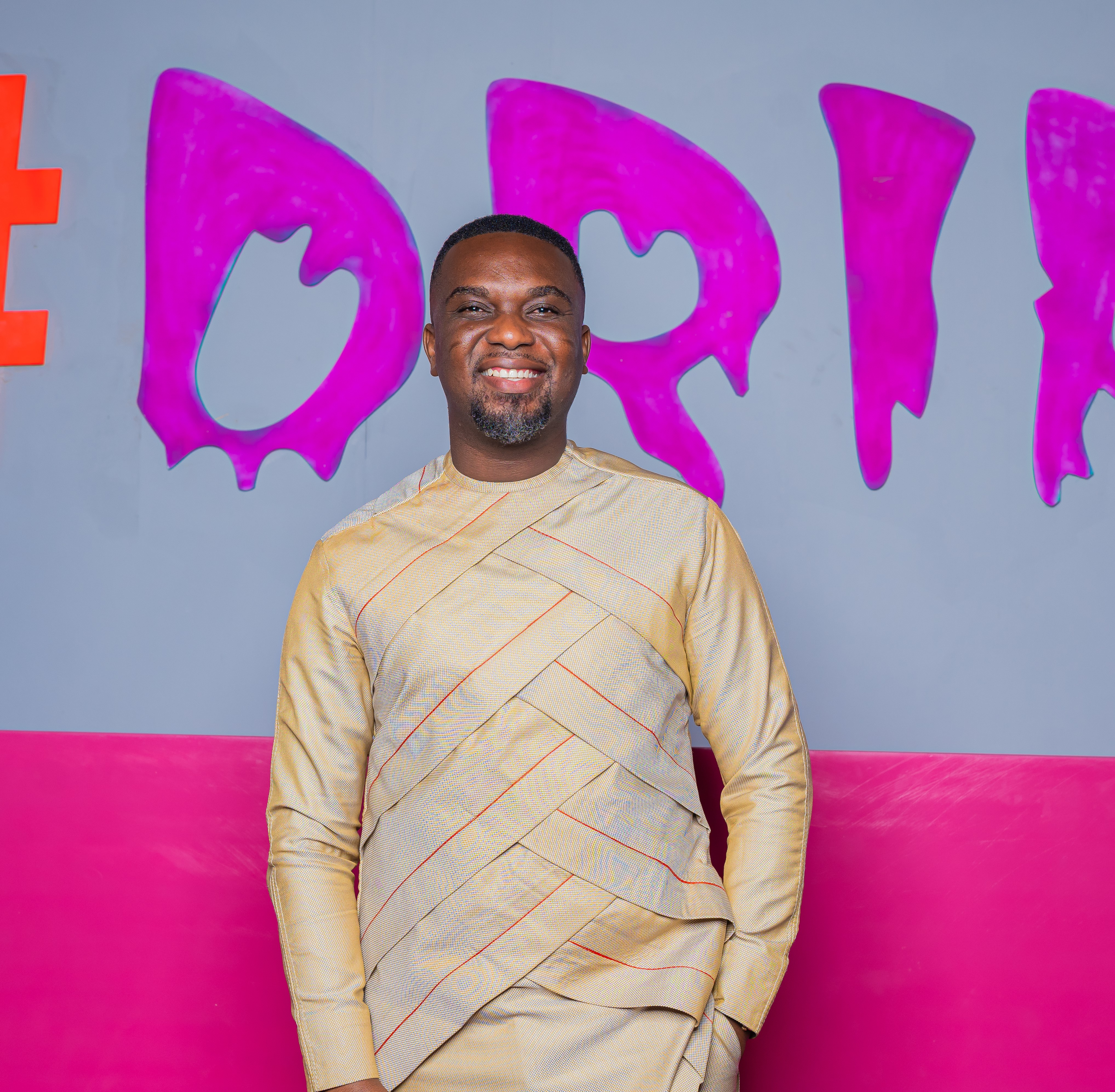
Joe Mettle at 3Music Awards 2022

=== Ministry and business ventures ===
In 2007, Joe Mettle Ministries was founded. The Ministry has two major annual headline events: Praiz Reloaded, midyear, and Lovegift in December every year.

Joe is the manager at Reverb Studios, which is a rehearsal and recording studio in Accra. The company provides musical equipment rental, as well as music and marketing, artiste management and consultancy services.

== Personal life ==
Joe married Salomey Selassie Dzisa in a traditional marriage ceremony in Accra (13 August 2020), and followed with an official wedding ceremony in Tema (15 August 2020).

== Awards and nominations ==
Year	Event	Prize	Recipient / Nominated work	Result	Ref
2025	Telecel Ghana Music Awards	Best Gospel Artiste	Himself	Won	
2025	Telecel Ghana Music Awards	Best Male Vocalist	Oba Awon Oba	Won	
2021	Vodafone Ghana Music Awards	Male Vocalist of the Year	Yesu Mo	Nominated	
2020	Vodafone Ghana Music Awards	Gospel Song of the Year	Mehia wo Yesu	Nominated	
2020	Vodafone Ghana Music Awards	Gospel Artiste of the Year	Himself	Nominated	
2020	Vodafone Ghana Music Awards	Male Vocalist of the Year	Himself	Nominated	
2020	Vodafone Ghana Music Awards	Album of the Year	Wind of Revival	Nominated	
2018	3 Music Awards	Gospel Act of the Year	Himself	Won	
2017	Ghana Music Awards	Artiste of the Year	Himself	Won	
2017	Ghana Music Awards	Gospel Artiste of the Year	Himself	Won	
2017	Ghana Music Awards	Male Vocalist Artiste of the Year	Himself	Won	
2016	RIGA Awards	Best Male Artist	Himself	Won	
2015	Ghana Music Awards	Gospel Artiste of the Year	Himself	Nominated	
2015	Ghana Music Awards	Vocal Performance of the year	Himself	Won	
2014	Africa Gospel Music Awards	Artiste of the Year West Africa	Himself	Nominated	
2014	CCML Ghana Gospel Awards	Best Praise Song of the year	Sound of Praise	Won	
2014	MTN 4Syte Music Video Awards	Best Gospel Video of the year	I Am Yours	Nominated	
2013	MTN 4Syte Music Video Awards	Best Alternative Reggae	Himself	Nominated	
2013	African Gospel Awards (UK)	Best Artist for West Africa	Himself	Nominated	
2012	Bass Awards	Alternate Song of the Year	Himself	Won	
2011	Gospel industry Awards	Best Male vocalist	Himself	Won	
2011	Gospel industry Awards	Best Song Writer	Himself	Won	
2011	Gospel industry Awards	Best Video of the Year	Himself	Won	
2011	African Gospel Awards (UK)	Best Artist for West Africa	Himself	Nominated	

== Discography ==
=== Albums ===
Year	Title	Ref
2011	My Gratitude	
2013	Sound of Praise	
2015	The Encounter	
2017	God Of Miracles	
2019	Wind of Revival	
2021	The Experience	

=== Singles ===
- "Medɔ Wo" (meaning "I Love You")
- "Sound of Praise"
- "Saved with Amazing Grace" (S.W.A.G.)
- "Ɔnwanwani" (meaning - God of Wonders)
- "Bo Nɔɔ Ni" (meaning "No One Else")
- "My Everything"
- "Ye Obua Mi"
- "Yesu Mo"
- "Great Jehovah"
- Give Me Oil In My Lamp
