= Medikal =

Ghanaian music artist

- Also known as: MDK, MedikalByK, Medikal
- Born: Samuel Adu Frimpong; April 5, 1994 (age 32); Accra, Ghana
- Origin: Sowutuom, Accra Ghana
- Genres: Hip hop; Afrobeat
- Occupations: Rapper; songwriter
- Years active: 2013-present
- Label: Beyond yaati

Samuel Adu Frimpong (born 5 April 1994), popularly known as Medikal, is a Ghanaian hip hop musician born to Portia Lamptey and James Frimpong in Sowutuom, a suburb of Accra.

== Early life and music career ==
He comes from Sowutuom, a suburb in Accra, Ghana. Medikal and Sarkodie had the highest nominations for the 2017 edition of the Ghana Music Awards. In 2018, he was on the Tim Westwood Show. Medikal had his high school education at Odorgonno Senior High. He is the son of James Frimpong and Portia Lamptey. Samuel adopted the name Medikal because he was fascinated with rapping about doctors, surgeons, medical practitioners and hospitals in general. Before he became a musician, he worked as a professional footballer for Ghana Premier League team Sekondi Hasaacas. He has made a name for himself in the music industry through hard work and numerous collaboration with successful artists. Apart from his nominations in 2017, he won the best discovery video in the MTN 4Syte Video Award in 2016. Medikal is known for his fast-paced rap style and witty wordplay in music, and he often incorporates Pidgin English and Ghanaian slang in his music.

== Discography ==
=== Singles ===
- Aboniki Flow (2025)
- Kala
- Grand Theft Auto GH
- Nyash
- Liqour
- Hear
- Eiii
- Wo Gyiii feat Berima Sean Bills & Kweku Afro
- Omo Ada
- Fully Active
- El Chairmano
- Wrowroho
- Too Risky
- Shoulder feat Shatta Wale

=== Albums and EPs ===
- Medikation (2013)
- Disturbation (2017)
- The Plug EP(2019)
- Island (2020)
- The Truth (2020)
- Planning and Plotting (2023)

== Awards and nominations ==
Year	Organization	Recipient/Nominated work	Award	Result	Ref
2026	Telecel Ghana Music Awards	Himself	Hiplife/Hip Hop Artist of the Year	Won	
2026	Telecel Ghana Music Awards	Medikal feat Shatta Wale & Beeztrap KOTM - Shoulder	Best Collaboration of the Year	Won	
2026	Telecel Ghana Music Awards	Medikal feat Shatta Wale & Beeztrap KOTM - Shoulder	Best HipLife Song of the Year	Won	
2026	Telecel Ghana Music Awards	Himself	Artiste of the Year	Nominated	
2026	Telecel Ghana Music Awards	Himself - Disturbation II	Album of the Year	Nominated	
2026	Telecel Ghana Music Awards	Medikal feat Shatta Wale & Beeztrap KOTM - Shoulder	Most Popular Song Of the Year	Won	
2021	Vodafone Ghana Music Awards	Himself	Hiplife/Hip Hop Artist of the Year	Won	
2021	Vodafone Ghana Music Awards	La Hustle rmx ft Joey B and Criss Waddle	Hip-Hop Song of the Year	Nominated	
2021	Vodafone Ghana Music Awards	Himself	Artist of the year	Won	
2021	3Music Awards	Himself	Artist (MVP) of the Year	Nominated	
2021	3Music Awards	La Hustle rmx ft Joey B and Criss Waddle	Song of the Year	Nominated	
2021	3Music Awards	Himself	Hiplife/Hip hop Act of the Year	Won	
2021	3Music Awards	La Hustle ft Joey B	Hip Hop Song of the Year	Nominated	
2021	3Music Awards	La Hustle rmx ft Joey B and Criss Waddle	Best Collaboration of the Year	Nominated	
2021	3Music Awards	Himself	Rapper of the Year	Nominated	
2021	3Music Awards	Himself	Most Streamed Act of the Year	Won	
2021	4syte Music Video Awards	'Odo' ft. King Promise	Best Male Video	Nominated	
2021	4syte Music Video Awards	La Hustle ft Joey B	Best Edited Video	Nominated	
2021	4syte Music Video Awards	Himself	Most Influential Artist	Won	
2021	4syte Music Video Awards	La Hustle rmx ft Joey B and Criss Waddle	Big Tune	Nominated	
2021	4syte Music Video Awards	La Hustle ft Joey B	Most Popular Video	Won	
2021	4syte Music Video Awards	'Nonsense'	Best Hip Hop Video	Nominated	
2020	Vodafone Ghana Music Awards	Himself	Hiplife/Hiphop Artist of the Year	Won	
2020	Vodafone Ghana Music Awards	"Omo Ada"	Hip-life song of the Year	Won	
2019	Vodafone Ghana Music Awards	Himself	Hip Hop Artist of the year	Won	
2019	Vodafone Ghana Music Awards	Himself	Best Rapper of the year	Won	
2019	4syte Music Video Awards	"Omo Ada"	Best Special Effect Video	Won	
2017	Vodafone Ghana Music Awards	Too Risky	Afro Pop Song Of The Year	Nominated	
2017	Vodafone Ghana Music Awards	Confirm feat Sarkodie	Hip Hop Song Of The Year	Nominated	
2017	Vodafone Ghana Music Awards	Himself	Hip-life/Hip Pop Artist Of The Year	Nominated	
2017	Vodafone Ghana Music Awards	Himself	Best New Act	Nominated	
2017	Vodafone Ghana Music Awards	Himself	Best Rapper of the year	Nominated	
2017	Vodafone Ghana Music Awards	Confirm feat Sarkodie	Best Collaboration of the year	Nominated	
2017		Himself	Overall Artist of the year	Nominated	
2017	Exclusive Men of the Year Awards (EMY)		Discovery of The Year Category	Won	
2017	African Muzik Magazine Awards (AFRIMMA)		Best Newcomer Category	Won	
2016	MTN 4Syte Music Video Awards	Anthem	Best Discovery Video	Won	

=== 3Music Awards ===
In March 2021, he won the Hiplife/Hiphop Act of the Year in the 3Music Awards.

In June 2021, he won the Hiplife/Hiphop Artist of the Year at the Vodafone Ghana Music Awards22.

== Personal life ==
Rapper Medikal married entrepreneur and movie star Fella Makafui in 2020. The couple announced their divorce in May 2024.

== Controversy ==
In October 2021, he was arrested for brandishing a gun on social media. He was later charged for unlawful display of arms and ammunition and he pleaded not guilty. He was then remanded to prison custody for 5 days by an Accra Circuit court. At the hearing on Tuesday, October 26, after five days on remand, he was granted bail to the tune of GH¢100,000 with one surety.
