= 2026 Ghana Music Awards =

- Awarded for: Outstanding achievement in the Ghanaian music industry between 1 January 2025 and 31 December 2025
- Sponsored by: Telecel Ghana
- Date: 9 May 2026
- Venue: Grand Arena of the Accra International Conference Centre, Accra
- Country: Ghana
- Presented by: Naa Ashorkor; AJ Akuoko-Sarpong; Giovani Caleb
- Website: ghanamusicawards.com

Television/radio coverage
- Networks
- TV3 (within Ghana) (Note: Accessible outside Ghana via DStv and GOtv.); Akwaaba Magic (outside Ghana) (Note: Only accessible via DStv and GOtv.)
- Runtime: 9 hours

The 27th edition of the Ghana Music Awards, sponsored by Telecel Ghana, was held on 9 May 2026 at the Grand Arena of the Accra International Conference Centre in Accra to recognize the works of artists during 2025. It was broadcast by TV3 locally in Ghana and Akwaaba Magic outside Ghana, both accessible outside Ghana via DStv and GOtv.

== Performance ==
Artist(s)	Song(s)	Link(s)
Enam	Libation; Afa; Modzi	
Morgan Nero	Agbozome Naomi; Vovome	Unsung Artiste of the Year Award Performance
Black Sherif	Lord I'm Amaze; January 9th; Soma Obi; Top of The Morning; Pop Star; Sacrifice	
Wendy Shay	Goodness of God (Cece Winans cover); Crazy Love; Too Late	
Kofi Kinaata	It Is Finished; Have Mercy 2; Effiekuma Love	
Samini	Pibilli; Electric Energy; Chaana; Linda (played during commercial)	
Medikal	Sometimes; Fully Active; No Stopping; Too Risky; Amanfour Girls; Shoulder	
Lasmid	Imaginary Mind; Meet 4 Corner; No Issues; Puul; Bad Boy; Darkest Style	
Diana Hamilton	Aha Ye; Adom; The doing of the Lord; w’asem; Mo Ne Yo	
Piesie Esther	Waye Me Yie; Nyame Ye	
Andy Dosty	Daddy Lumba Tribute Performance (Makra Mo); Aben Wɔha; Enko Den	
Ofori Amponsah	Daddy Lumba Tribute Performance (Aunty Ataa), Woho Kyere	
Okyeame Kwame & Kwabena Kwabena	Daddy Lumba Tribute Performance (Enshie Wo)	
Ras Kuuku	Daddy Lumba Tribute Performance (Ankwanoma)	
Fido	Dollarpor; Awolowo; Dance For Jesus; Joy Is Coming	
R2Bees	Bayla Trap; Nineteen Ninety; Ajeei; Kiss Your Hand; Love; Makoma; Odo; CCTV; Boys Kasa; Slow Down; Over; Walaahi	

== Presenters ==
The event was hosted by :

- Naa Ashorkor Mensah–Doku
- Giovani Caleb
- Godwin Namboh (Red Carpet Host)
- Regina Van Helvet (Red Carpet Host)

== Winners and nominees ==
This is the list of winners for the 2026 edition of the event.

Artist of the Year	Best Gospel Artiste of the Year
Black Sherif; Wendy Shay; Stonebwoy; Medikal; Sarkodie; Black Sherif	Diana Hamilton; Mabel Okyere; Kofi Owusu Peprah; Piesie Esther; Nana Yaw Ofori-Atta; MOG Music
Best Reggae/Dancehall Artiste of the Year	Best Reggae/Dancehall Song
Stonebwoy; Ras Kuuku; Samini	"Shake It to the Max (Fly) (Remix)" – Moliy (featuring Shenseea, Skillibeng, and Silent Addy); "Torcher" – Stonebwoy; "Larger Than Life (LTL)" – Cina Soul; "Summer King" – Samini; "Talisman" – Arathejay; "Pharaoh" – Amerado
Best Traditional Gospel Song	Best Highlife Artiste of the Year
"Nyame Ye" – Piesie Esther; "Correct" – Joyce Blessing (featuring King Paluta); "Akorfala" – Celestine Donkor (featuring Diana Hamilton); "M'aseda" – Kofi Owusu Peprah (featuring Diana Hamilton); "So Far So Good" – Mabel Okyere; "Baba God (Matthew 6:26)" – Paul Enana	Kofi Kinaata; Kuami Eugene; Fameye; King Paluta; Kwabena Kwabena
Best African Song	Songwriter of the Year
With You - Davido (featuring Omah Lay); "Laho II" - Shallipopi and Burna Boy; "Kelebu" - Rema; "Nakupenda" - TxC, Davido, Shoday, and Scotts Maphuma (featuring Zlatan and Al Xapo); "Chanel" - Tyla; "Joy is Coming" - Fido	"Sacrifice" – Black Sherif; "Have Mercy II" - Kofi Kinaata; "Take Me Home" - Cofi Boham; "Obi Nnim (Obinim)" – Akwaboah; "Send Them a Prayer" – Stonebwoy; "Abeberese" - Ko-Jo Cue
Best Collaboration of the Year	Best International Collaboration of The Year
"Shoulder" – Medikal (featuring Shatta Wale and Beeztrap KOTM); "Crazy Love" – Wendy Shay (featuring OliveTheBoy); "Gymnastic" – KiDi (featuring KOJOBLAK and OliveTheBoy); "Aso II" – Kwabena Kwabena (featuring Stonebwoy and Kofi Kinaata); "Violence" – Sarkodie (featuring Kweku Smoke); "Excellent" – KOJOBLAK (featuring Kelvyn Boy)	Shake It to the Max (Fly) (Remix) – Moliy (featuring Shenseea, Skillibeng, and Silent Addy); "So It Goes" – Black Sherif (featuring Fireboy DML); "Too Late 2.0" – Wendy Shay (featuring Bedjine, Phina, and Guchi); "Meet 4 Corner" – Lasmid (featuring Shallipopi); "See What We've Done" – King Promise (featuring Mr Eazi); "Body Go" – Moliy (featuring Tyla)
Best Rap Performance	Best Male Vocal Performance
"Mensei Da" - Strongman; "4GG (For God's Glory)" – Joe Kay; "Abeberese" – Ko-Jo Cue; "Violence" – Sarkodie; "Welcome to Africa" – Medikal; "5th August 9" – Lyrical Joe	"Akoma" - Asiama; "By Prayer" – Perez Musik; "Time (Live Session)" – Deon Boakye; "Yehoda" – Carl Clottey; "Catch-22" – Josh Blakk
Best Female Vocal Performance	Best New Artist
"Amin" – Enam; "See Me Through" – Grace Charles (by Team Eternity GH); "Beni Tookwɛiloi" - Lordina The Soprano; "Breathe" - Cina Soul; "Show Me How to Love" - Niiella	KOJOBLAK; Adom Kiki; Lalid; Gona Boy
Record of The Year	Album/EP of The Year
"Enso Nyame Ye" – Kwabena Kwabena; "Chaana" – Samini (featuring Soweto Gospel Choir); "Akoma" – Asiama; "For My Good" – Soul Winners (featuring Joe Mettle); "Afa" – Enam; "Kwame Macho" – Rama Blak	"Iron Boy" – Black Sherif; "Disturbation II" – Medikal; "Ready" – Wendy Shay; "Torcher" – Stonebwoy; "After Midnight" – Gyakie; "Walk With Me" - Kweku Smoke
Telecel Most Popular Song of the Year	Best Music Video
"Shoulder" – Medikal (featuring Shatta Wale and Beeztrap KOTM); "Shake It to the Max (Fly) (Remix)" – Moliy (featuring Shenseea, Skillibeng, and Silent Addy); "Foko!" – King Paluta; "Sacrifice" - Black Sherif; "Crazy Love" – Wendy Shay (featuring OliveTheBoy); "Gymnastic" – KiDi (featuring KOJOBLAK and OliveTheBoy); "Olivia" – Lasmid; "Nyame Ye" – Piesie Esther; "Excellent" – KOJOBLAK (featuring Kelvyn Boy)	"Put Am On God" (Directed by David Duncan) – AraTheJay; "Excellent" (Directed by Henry Akrong) – KOJOBLAK (featuring Kelvyn Boy); "Sacrifice" (Directed by Meekah Jagun) – Black Sherif; "Welcome to Africa" (Directed by Xbills Ebenezer) – Medikal; "Shine" (Directed by Yaw Skyface) – Stonebwoy; "Chaana" (Directed by Yaw Skyface) – Samini (featuring Soweto Gospel Choir)
Best Hiplife/Hip Hop Artist of the Year	Producer of the Year
Medikal; Ko-Jo Cue; Black Sherif; Sarkodie; O'Kenneth; Kweku Smoke	A-Town TSB; Ugly & Tough; Samsney; Beatz Vampire; Khendi Beatz; Kuami Eugene; Mix Master Garzy
Best Hip Hop Song of The Year	Best Highlife Song
"Where Dem Boyz" – Black Sherif; "Balenciaga" – O'Kenneth; "Violence" – Sarkodie (featuring Kweku Smoke); "Adu The Borga" – Kweku Smoke; "Same Timbs" – Gona Boy; "The Matter" – Lalid	"It is Finished" – Kofi Kinaata; "Foko!" – King Paluta; "Aso II" – Kwabena Kwabena feat. Stonebwoy & Kofi Kinaata; "Obi Adi" – Amerado; "Do Better" – Kuami Eugene
Best Afrobeats Song	Best Afropop Song
"Excellent" - KOJOBLAK (featuring Kelvyn Boy); "Crazy Love" – Wendy Shay (featuring OliveTheBoy); "Gymnastic" – KiDi (featuring KOJOBLAK and OliveTheBoy); "No Issues" – Lasmid (featuring King Promise); "OMG" – Mr Drew (featuring OliveTheBoy)	"Sacrifice" – Black Sherif; "Sankofa" – Gyakie; "Gidi Gidi (Fire)" – Stonebwoy; "See What We've Done" – King Promise (featuring Mr Eazi); "Bend" – OliveTheBoy (featuring Sarkodie); "Olivia" – Lasmid
Best Group	Best Urban Contemporary Gospel Song
Keche; Soul Winners; Lali x Lola; Bethel Revival Choir	"Big God Afro" – Kofi Owusu Preprah; "Ready" – Scott Evans; "Ebefa" – Ewura Abena; "Stamina" – Kofi Karikari; "Yehoda" – Carl Clottey (featuring Luigi Maclean); "Aha Ye (The Good Place)" – Diana Hamilton (featuring Ntokozo Mbambo and Elder Mireku)
Unsung Artiste of the Year	Best Afrobeats/Afropop Artist
Morgan Nero; Bosoma; Siicie; Cojo Rae; Haeven	Wendy Shay; KOJOBLAK; OliveTheBoy; KiDi; Moliy; Gyakie
Audio Engineer of the Year	Best Video Director
Daniel Grahl – "Enso Nyame Y3"; Francis Kweku Osei - "Chaana"; Kwame Yeboah - "Akoma"; Samuel Laryea Otoo - "For My Good"; KC BEATZ - "Afa"; Robo DaBeat Scientist - "Kwame Macho"	David Duncan – "Put Am On God" – AraTheJay
Music For Good	Lifetime Achievement Award
"Crox it Out (Breast Cancer)" - Lali x Lola; "Tree for Life" - Nacee; "Asaase Nnwom" - Rama Blak & Opoku Brew; "Stop Galamsey Now" - Nacee	Daddy Lumba
