= 2025 Ghana Music Awards =

- Awarded for: Outstanding achievement in the Ghanaian music industry between Mid-2024 and Mid-2025
- Sponsored by: Telecel Ghana
- Date: May 10, 2025
- Venue: Grand Arena of the Accra International Conference Centre, Accra
- Country: Ghana
- Presented by: Naa Ashorkor; AJ Akuoko-Sarpong; Foster Romanus
- Website: ghanamusicawards.com

Television/radio coverage
- Networks
- TV3 (within Ghana) (Note: Accessible outside Ghana via DStv and GOtv.); Akwaaba Magic (outside Ghana) (Note: Only accessible via DStv and GOtv.)
- Runtime: 7 hours

The 26th edition of the Ghana Music Awards, sponsored by Telecel Ghana, was held on the 10th day of May, 2025 at the Grand Arena of the Accra International Conference Centre in Accra to recognize the works of artists in the year under review. It was broadcast by TV3 locally in Ghana and Akwaaba Magic outside Ghana, both accessible outside Ghana via DStv and GOtv.

== Performance ==
Artist(s)	Song(s)	Link(s)
Ayisi	Can I Live; Grind	
Yaw Darling	Pull Up; Password	Unsung Artiste of the Year Award Performance
Empress Gifty	Watch Me	
Daughters of Glorious Jesus		
Tribute to Yaw Sarpong		Lifetime Achievement Award Performance
Stonebwoy	Send Dem A Prayer; Sobolo; Yenabra (with 2Toff); Pull Up; Bawasaaba; Go Higher; Gidi Gidi (Fire); Jejereje	
Beeztrap KOTM	Fly Girl; Yesu; African Girls (Castro song)	
Kojo Blak	Next Door; Excellent	
Moliy	Shake It To The Max; Backie	
Tribute to Osibisa (Adomaa, TiTi Owusu, and Adina Thembi)	The Coffee Song; Celebration; The Warrior; Woyaya	
King Promise	Paris; Terminator; Keep It Sexy; Favourite Story; Continental	
King Paluta	Aseda; For The Popping (Apicki); Makoma	
KiDi	Sika (with King Paluta); Cheat On You; Lomo Lomo	
Fameye	Fortified; Odo Esisi Me (Akatakyie song); Very Soon	
Kweku Smoke	Holy Ghost; Young Boy	

== Presenters ==
The event was hosted by :

- Naa Ashorkor Mensah–Doku
- AJ Akuoko–Sarpong
- Foster Romanus
- Bliss King
- Regina Van Helvet

== Winners and nominees ==
This is the list of winners for the 2025 edition of the event.

Artist of the Year	Best Gospel Artiste of the Year
King Promise; Kweku Smoke; Stonebwoy; Team Eternity; Joe Mettle; King Paluta; Black Sherif	Joe Mettle; Diana Hamilton; Empress Gifty; Piesie Esther; Team Eternity Ghana; MOG Music
Best Reggae/Dancehall Artiste of the Year	Best Reggae/Dancehall Song
Stonebwoy; Epixode; Ras Kuuku; Samini; Jupitar; Rocky Dawuni	Psalm 23 – Stonebwoy; I Keep Winning – Jupitar; Shake It To The Max – Moliy & Silent Addy; Chemistry – Samini; Road of Evil – Ras Kuuku; Ankonam Remix – Amerado feat. Samini
Best Traditional Gospel Song	Best Highlife Artiste of the Year
Watch Me – Empress Gifty; Wo Ye – MOG Music; The Doing of the Lord – Diana Hamilton; Omewoya – Queendalyn feat. Judikay; Ateene – Piesie Esther; Victory – Mavis Asante	Fameye; Kuami Eugene; Kofi Kinaata; Sista Afia; Kwabena Kwabena
Best African Song	Songwriter of the Year
Tshwalabam - Titom Feat. S.N.E, Yuppe, Burnaboy; Ozeba - Rema; Love Me Jeje - Tems; Favourite Girl Remix - Darkoo feat. Rema; Commas - Ayra Starr; Biri Marung - Mr Pilato, Ego Slimflow, Tebogo G Mashego feat. Sje Konka, Focalistic, DJ Maphorisa, Scotts Maphuma	Saman – Kofi Kinaata; Can I Live - Ayisi; No Competition - Okyeame Kwame; Asylum – OliveTheBoy; Defe Defe – Team Eternity
Collaboration of the Year	International Collaboration of The Year
Lomo Lomo – Kidi feat. Black Sherif; Fly Girl – Beeztrap KOTM, Oseikrom Sikani; Favourite Story – King Promise feat. Sarkodie, OliveTheBoy; ODo Bi Ye Bad – Rap Fada feat. King Paluta; Amen – Sarkodie feat. Beeztrap KOTM; Give Me Oil – Joe Mettle feat. Sandra Boakye Duah	The Doing of the Lord – Diana Hamilton feat. Mercy Chinwo; Oba Awan Oba – Joe Mettle feat. Sunmisola Agbebi; Ekelebe – Stonebwoy feat. Odumodublvck; Continental – King Promise feat. Shallipopi; Drip Rmx – GAMBO feat. Edem, Jim Jones; Jiggle and Whine – Stonebwoy feat. Spice
Best Rap Performance	Best Male Vocal Performance
Holy Ghost - Kweku Smoke; No Manual – Eno Barony; No Competition – Okyeame Kwame; Brag – Sarkodie; King Is Back – Flowking Stone; 5th August 8 – Lyrical Joe	Oba Awan Oba - Joe Mettle; Do Not Fear – Kofi Nuel; Aseda – Emmanuel Juddah; Ahouden Fofro – MOG Music; Can I Live – Ayisi
Best Female Vocal Performance	Best New Artist
I Choose To Praise – Esther Godwyll; Defe Defe – Naana Asiedu (Team Eternity Ghana); Simply Trusting Everyday - Lordina The Soprano; On Fire - Mima Afrika; Nobody - TiTi Owusu	Beeztrap KOTM; Lali X Lola; AraTheJay; Rap Fada; Team Eternity; Kwesi Amewuga
Record of The Year	Album/EP of The Year
Can I Live (Live) – Ayisi; Okyena Asem – Berima Amo feat. Pat Thomas; Auntie Ama – Kofi Kinaata; Fallen Angel – Smallgod feat. Black Sherif; Holy Ghost – Kweku Smoke; Fakye Me – Kwabena Kwabena feat. Obaapa Christy	True to Self – King Promise; Kweku Jesus – Kweku Smoke; Give Time Some Time – King Paluta; Up and Running – Stonebwoy; Kofi Ooo Kofi – Kofi Kinaata; Testimony - Team Eternity Ghana
Telecel Most Popular Song of the Year	Best Music Video
Aseda – King Paluta; Asylum – OliveTheBoy; January 9 – Black Sherif; Paris - King Promise; Very Soon – Fameye; Lomo Lomo – KiDi feat. Black Sherif; Puul – Lasmid; Defe Defe – Team Eternity Ghana; Jejereje – Stonebwoy	Jejereje (Directed by Banini) – Stonebwoy; Fallen Angel (Directed by Babs Direction) – Smallgod feat. Black Sherif; Auntie Ama (Directed by Awudu Musa) – Kofi Kinaata; Continental (Directed by Meekah Jagun) – King Promise; P.O.M. (Peace of Mind) ( Directed by Rex) – MzVee; Keep It Sexy (Directed by Rex – King Promise
Best Hiplife/Hip Hop Artist of the Year	Producer of the Year
Kweku Smoke; Amerado; Medikal; Beeztrap KOTM; King Paluta; Sarkodie; Black Sherif	Khendi Beatz
Best Hip Hop Song of The Year	Best Highlife Song
Holy Ghost – Kweku Smoke; Princess – Joey B; Awoyo Sofo – Kwaw Kese feat. Kofi Mole; Amen – Sarkodie feat. Beeztrap KOTM; Fly Girl – Beeztrap KOTM & Oseikrom Sikani; Kilos Milos – Black Sherif	Aseda – King Paluta; Very Soon – Fameye; Abronoma – Amerado; Odo Bi Ye Bad – Rap Fada feat. King Paluta; Canopy – Kuami Eugene; EffiaKuma Broken Heart - Kofi Kinaata
Best Afrobeats Song	Best Afropop Song
Asylum - OliveTheBoy; Sneaky – Mr Drew; Puul – Lasmid; Yesu – Beeztrap KOTM; Lomo Lomo – KiDi feat. Black Sherif; Favourite Story – King Promise feat. Sarkodie, OliveTheBoy	Paris – King Promise; Fefe Ne Fe – Kwesi Arthur; Fallen Angel – Smallgod feat. Black Sherif; Jesus Christ 2 – AratheJay feat. Black Sherif; January 9th – Black Sherif; Jejereje – Stonebwoy
Best Group	Best Urban Contemporary Gospel Song
Team Eternity Ghana; Lali X Lola; Keche; Kwan Pa; Bethel Revival Choir	Defe Defe – Team Eternity Ghana; Call – Scott Evans; Give Me Oil – Joe Mettle feat. Sandra Boakye Duah; Owanwani – Nana Yaw Ofori Atta; Cast Your Burden – Koby Salm feat. S.O.N Music; Dry Bones – Ohemaa Mercy feat. Kofi Owusu Peprah
Unsung Artiste of the Year	Best Afrobeats/Afropop Artist
Yaw Darling; Romeo Swag; Kojo Vypa; Kaesa; Ess Thee Legend; Fad Lan	King Promise; OliveTheBoy; Camidoh; KiDi; Mr. Drew; Lasmid
Audio Engineer of the Year	Best Video Director
Peewezel – Can I Live by Ayisi	Dir. Banini – Jejereje by Stonebwoy
Music For Good	Lifetime Achievement Award
Epixode	Yaw Sarpong
