= Celestine Donkor =

Ghanaian gospel musician and songwriter

- Born: Celestine Akakpo
- Genre: Gospel
- Occupations: Singer, songwriter
- Years active: 2007–present
- Spouse: Kofi Donkor

Celestine Donkor is a Ghanaian gospel musician and songwriter. In March 2021, she was among the Top 30 Most Influential Women in Music by the 3Music Awards Women's Brunch. She won the Gospel song of the year at the Ghana Music Awards 2021 with her hit single Agbebolo. She founded the Celestial Praise, an annual Gospel music concert. She has featured and collaborated with international artistes like Kenyan gospel artiste Evelyn Wanjiru, Zimbabwean gospel musician Tembalami, Ghanaian artistes Diana Hamilton, Piesie Esther, Obaapa Christy, Akwaboah, Efya, and many more.

== Early life and education ==
Donkor was born to the family of Mr. and Mrs. Akakpo, both from the Volta region of Ghana. She started her primary school education at St Augustine Preparatory school in Abeka Lapaz and continued to Nsaaniya Secondary Business School at Kasoa where she had her secondary school education. She proceeded to the University of Ghana, Legon where she obtained her BA (Hons) Sociology and Information studies.

== Music career ==
At the age of sixteen, while still in secondary school, Celestine met music producer and sound engineer Fred Kyei Mensah, popularly known as Fredyma, who introduced her to the Ghanaian music industry as a backing vocalist. Her collaboration with Fredyma marked the beginning of her professional music career. She subsequently served as a backing vocalist for several prominent Ghanaian contemporary gospel musicians.

In 2016, she founded Celestial Praiz, an annual gospel music event. Since its inception, the event has featured gospel artists and ministers from across Africa, including Minister GUC, Zaza Mokhethi, Evelyn Wanjiru, Daughters of Glorious Jesus, Joe Mettle, Ceccy Twum, Piesie Esther, Uncle Ato among others.

She has many hit songs, including "Turning around", "Bigger", "Okronkronhene", "Manim Nguase", "Boobobo". Her latest Album Agbebolo earned her the Artiste of the year at the National Gospel Music Awards.

== Personal life ==
Donkor is married, and has three daughters.

== Discography ==
=== Albums ===
- Gye Wadea (2007)
- Restoration (2010)
- Righteousness (2015)
- Turning Around (2015)
- Okronkronhene (2018)
- Bread of life (2019)

== Awards and nominations ==
Year	Event	Award	Nominated work	Result	Ref
2022	3Music Awards	Gospel Act Of The Year	Herself	Won	
2022	3Music Awards	Artiste Of The Year	Herself	Nominated	
2022	3Music Awards	Gospel Song of the Year	Only You	Nominated	
2022	3Music Awards	Woman of the Year	Herself	Nominated	
2021	Vodafone Ghana Music Awards	Best Gospel Artiste Of The Year	Herself	Nominated	
2021	Vodafone Ghana Music Awards	International Collaboration Of The Year	Favor everywhere ft Blessing Wanjiru	Nominated	
2021	Vodafone Ghana Music Awards	Best Gospel Song Of The Year	Favor everywhere ft Blessing Wanjiru	Nominated	
2020	Vodafone Ghana Music Awards	Gospel Song Of The Year	Agbebolo (Bread of Life) ft Nhyiraba Gideon	Won	
2020	Vodafone Ghana Music Awards	Female Vocalist of the Year	Herself	Won	
2020	3Music Awards	Gospel Song Of The Year	Agbebolo (Bread of Life) ft Nhyiraba Gideon	Won	
2019	National Gospel Music Awards	Artiste of the Year	Herself	Won	
2019	National Gospel Music Awards	Album Of The Year	Agbebolo	Won	
2019	National Gospel Music Awards	Collaboration Of The Year	Agbebolo (Bread of Life) ft Nhyiraba Gideon	Won	
2018	Vodafone Ghana Music Awards	Gospel Artiste Of The Year	Herself	Nominated	
2014	Christian Community Music Awards	Best Traditional Song	Herself	Won	
2012	Christian Community Music Awards	Best Traditional Song	Herself	Won	
2009	MTN Music Video Awards	Best Gospel Video	Supernatural	Won	
