= Beatz Vampire =

Ghanaian record producer and sound engineer

- Born: Asare Badiako Peter; Ejisu, Ghana
- Origin: Konongo, Ghana
- Genres: Afrobeats, Afropop, Highlife, Hiplife, Amapiano
- Occupations: Record producer, sound engineer
- Years active: 2019–present
- Label: Loop Music (CEO)
- Website: beatzvampire.com

Asare Badiako Peter, known professionally as Beatz Vampire, is a Ghanaian music producer and sound engineer known for his contributions to the Afrobeats and Afropop genres.

== Early life ==
Beatz Vampire hails from Konongo, Ghana. His interest in music production developed during his time in Konongo, but it was after relocating to Accra that he began to pursue music production more seriously.

== Career ==
Beatz Vampire's career gained momentum in 2021 when he produced the viral track "Washawasay", which utilized a vocal sample from Cecilia Marfo.

He has since produced several successful tracks, including:

- "Hajia Bintu" and "1 Don" by Shatta Wale
- "Mood" and "S3k3" by Mr Drew
- "Atele" and "Sika" by Lasmid
- "Beautiful" by Jahmiel featuring Sarkodie
- "Jaiye" by P-Square

In 2023, Beatz Vampire produced "Butta My Bread" by JZyNO and Lasmid, which achieved over 160 million streams across various platforms. He also produced "Goodsin" by OliveTheBoy and "I Lied" by KiDi, both which received significant acclaim.

In 2025, he produced his debut instrumental album, "Culture Harmonies".

== Awards and nominations ==
Selected awards and nominations
Year	Award	Category	Work	Result	Ref.
2022	Ghana Music Awards	Producer of the Year	N/A	Nominated	
2022	Ghana Music Awards	Producer of the Year	N/A	Nominated	
2023	Vodafone Ghana Music Awards	Producer of the Year	N/A	Nominated	
2023	TurnTable Charts	Top 100 African Producers	Rank 17	Listed	
2024	Vodafone Ghana Music Awards	Producer of the Year	N/A	Nominated	

== Discography ==
=== Selected Productions ===
- "Bend" – OliveTheBoy ft. Sarkodie
- "Apology" – Wendy Shay ft. Mavado
- "Sneaky" – Mr Drew
- "Likor" – KiDi ft. Stonebwoy
- "Asylum" – OliveTheBoy
- "HBP" – Boy Llona ft. Bella Shmurda
- "Washawasay" – Beatz Vampire (2021)
- "Hajia Bintu" – Shatta Wale
- "1 Don" – Shatta Wale
- "Mood" – Mr Drew
- "S3k3" – Mr Drew ft. Medikal
- "Atele" – Lasmid
- "Sika" – Lasmid
- "Beautiful" – Jahmiel ft. Stonebwoy
- "Jaiye" – P-Square
- "Butta My Bread" – JZyNO and Lasmid
- "Goodsin" – OliveTheBoy
- "I Lied" – KiDi
- "Wanting" – Beatz Vampire ft. OliveTheBoy (2025)

=== Album ===
- "Culture Harmonies" (2025)

== Personal life ==
Beatz Vampire is the CEO of Loop Music, an independent record label.
