= Asantewaa (TikToker) =

Ghanaian social media influencer

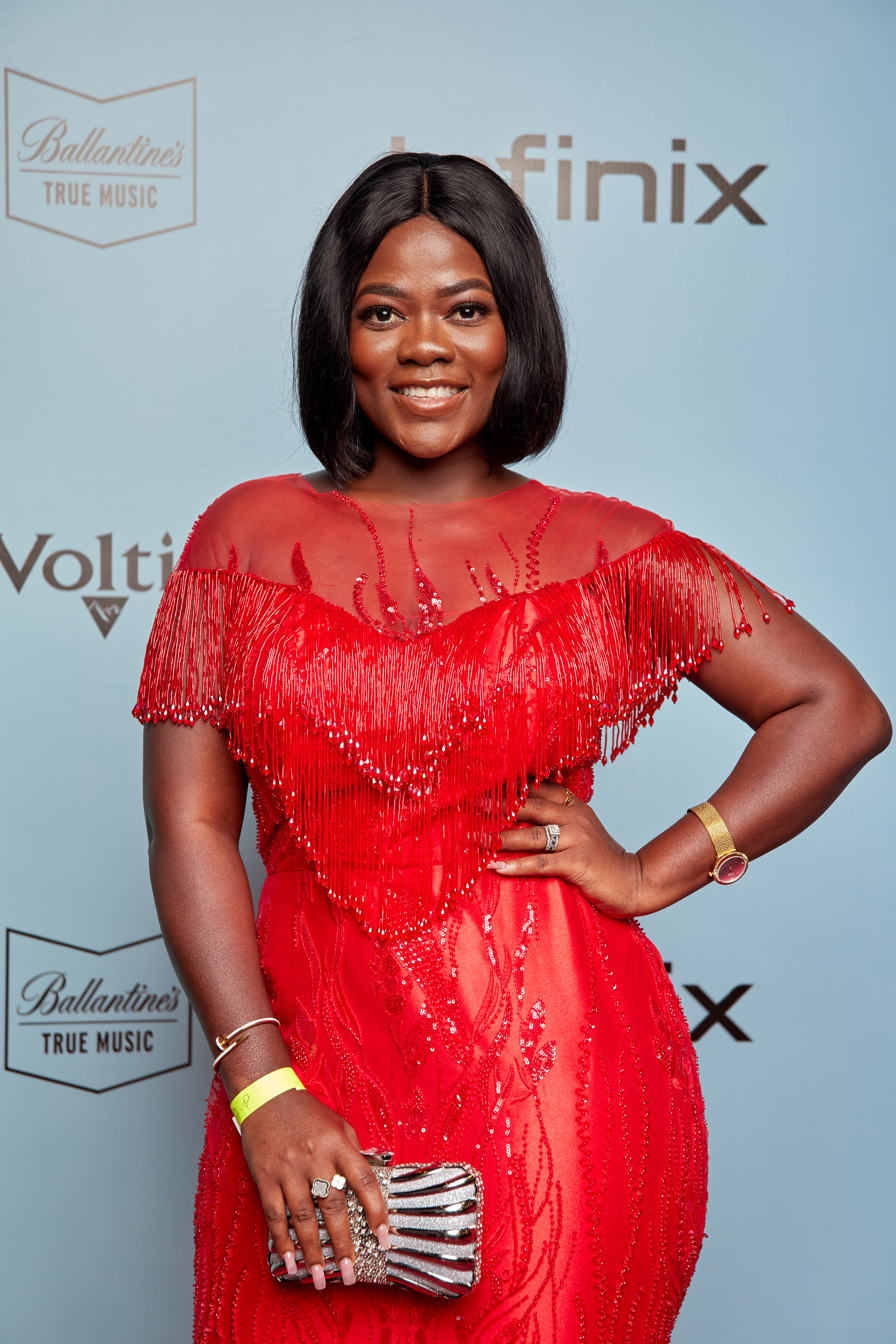
- Asantewaa at 3Music Awards 22
- Born: Martina Dwamena; Accra, Ghana
- Occupation: Social media personality

TikTok information
- Page: King Of Queens
- Followers: 4.0 million
- Last updated: 9 June 2026

Martina Dwamena, who goes by the mononym Asantewaa, is a Ghanaian TikToker. She is known for the funny videos she started creating during the global Coronavirus pandemic, when she rapidly gained followers on TikTok. In 2021, Asantewaa won the Pulse Ghana award for TikTok influencer of the year.

== Early life and education ==
Martina Dwamena was raised by her grandmother, after her mother died when she was ten years old. After graduating from Winneba Senior High School, Dwamena worked as a teacher and as a MoMo vendor for three years to support herself and her younger brother, and save for her tertiary education. She then attended the nursing training college, where she was introduced to TikTok by a friend and coursemate.

== Career ==
Asantewaa's career as a TikTok and social media influencer started in 2020 during the COVID-19 pandemic, during lockdown. In less than a year, she developed a huge following, and two years later, she reported that she was earning over GH¢10k per month. Adom Online noted that "Whether you are a TikTok subscriber or not, you probably would have heard of Asantewaa, a young lady who brought smiles on many faces during the 2020 coronavirus pandemic lockdown."

In October 2021, Asantewaa was awarded TikTok influencer of the year at the Pulse Ghana Influencer Awards. By then, she had 800,000 followers and 19 million likes on TikTok.

Although Asantewaa has promoted songs such as "Friday Night" by Lasmid in her skits and viral videos in the past, in 2023, she stated that she no longer offers music promotion services.

== Personal life ==
Asantewaa married Jeffery Obiri Boahen in 2017.
