= Evelyn Wanjiru =

Kenyan singer

Evelyn Wanjirū
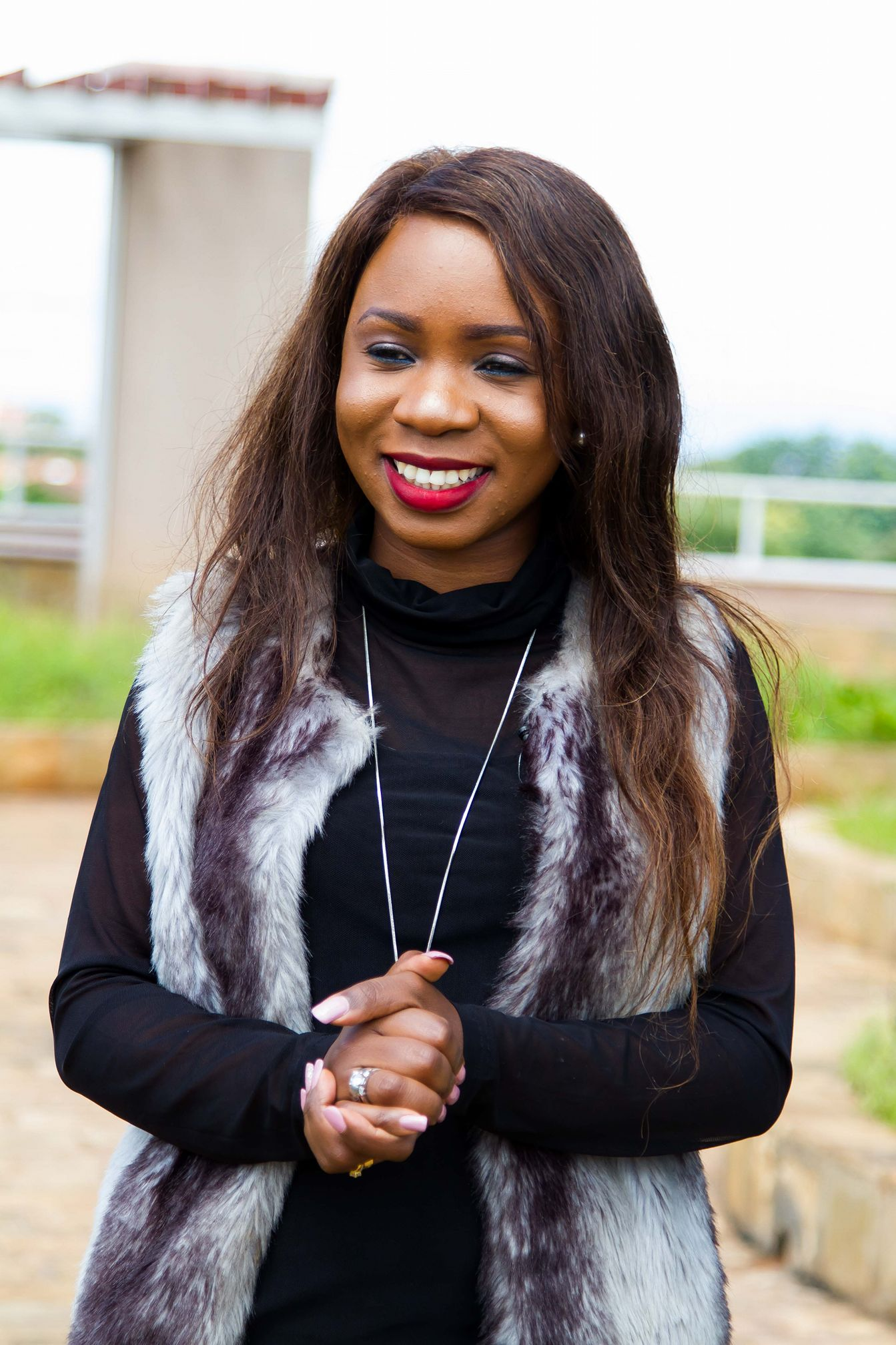
- Wanjiru (2018)
- Born: 6 May 1990 (age 36); Nairobi, Kenya
- Occupations: Singer; Worship Leader; Arranger; Composer; Songwriter; Author; Businesswoman
- Years active: 2010–present
- Spouse: Agundabweni Akweyu (m. 2012)
- Children: 1
- Musical career
- Genres: Contemporary worship music, contemporary Christian music
- Instruments: Piano, Acoustic Guitar
- Label: Bwenieve
- Website: www.evelynwanjiru.com

Evelyn Wanjirū (born 6 May 1990) is a Kenyan gospel singer, worship leader, songwriter, and music director. She is also an entrepreneur, the host of the annual worship event Praise Atmosphere, and co-founder of Bwenieve Production. Wanjirū's song “Mazingira,” which was adopted as the theme for a Kenyan government environmental conservation campaign, leading to her appointment as a music ambassador for the Mau Forest initiative. Her album Mungu Mkuu won Album of the Year at the 2015 Groove Awards, and her collaboration “Tulia” (featuring Vicky Kitonga) won Collaboration of the Year at the same awards in 2016. She has also received nominations at the All Africa Music Awards and the Sauti Awards. She is known for songs such as “Mungu Mkuu,” “Celebrate,” “Na Iwe Maombi,” “Jehovah Elohim,” “Waweza,” “Utukufu,” “Nikufahamu,” and “Asante.” In 2024, Wanjirū published her first book, The Wait, documenting her personal experience of waiting for a child alongside her husband, Agundabweni Akweyu.

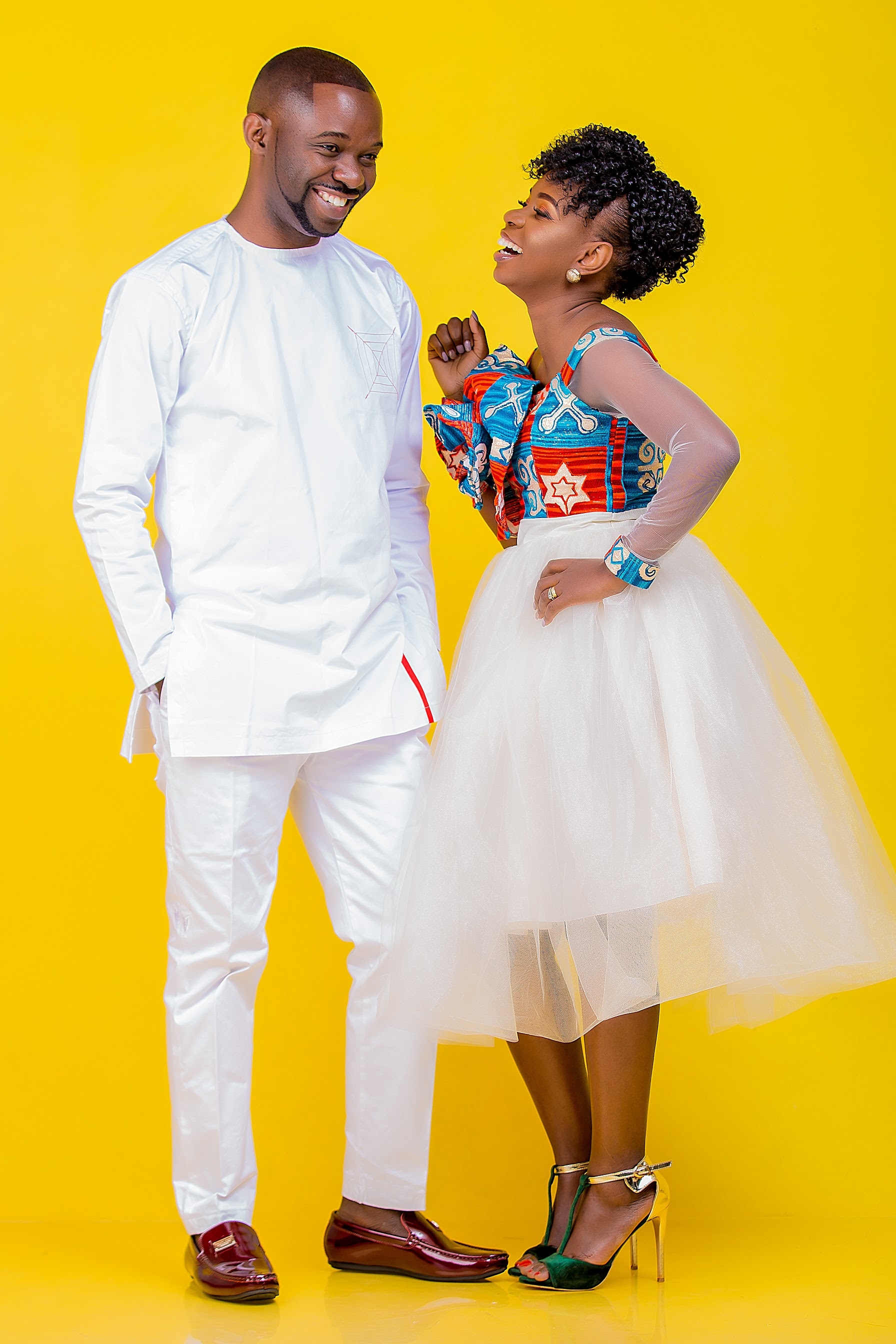
Evelyn Wanjiru and her husband Agundabweni Akweyu

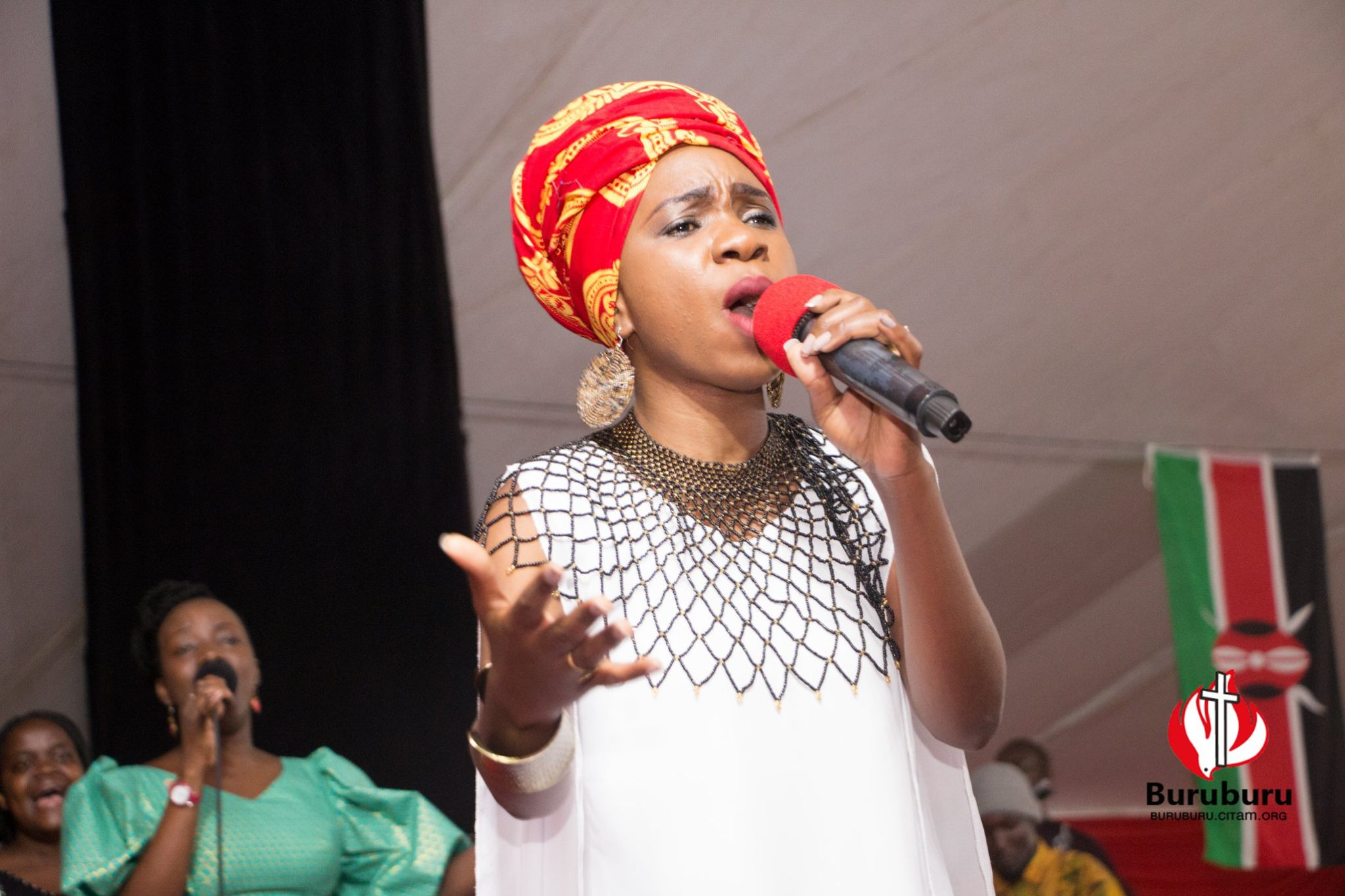
Evelyn Wanjiru Leading Worship at Citam Buruburu

== Life and career ==
Wanjirū is the fourth-born of Helen Muhonja and Crispin Kinyūa in a family of five. Born in Nairobi in 1989, she was raised in Nakuru's Freehold Estate, where she attended Saint Mary's Girls Primary and Langalanga Secondary School. Wanjirū started singing at age nine in church and school music festivals.

Early on, she was actively involved in drama and the school choir. She later joined Tears Group, Nakuru, for a course in music before further benefiting from the Permanent Presidential Music Commission (P.P.M.C) at the 2010 Talent Academy at Kabarak University. After early successes in church and school festivals, she was discovered by music producer Agundabweni Akweyu. Together they started Bwenieve Productions, a music recording studio. She recorded her first album "Mazingira," which was later re-branded as "Waweza. This album received accolades, most notably for her songs "Waweza" and "Hossana. "Waweza" was nominated as Worship Song and Wanjiru as New Artist of the Year for the 2012 Groove Awards.

The song "Mazingira" was also selected as the theme song of the Kenyan government's campaign to reclaim Mau Forest in 2010. During the launch of this reforestation project in eastern Mau, the incumbent Prime Minister of Kenya was impressed by the song, appointing Wanjiru as the official music ambassador for Mau Forest. Under the auspices of this appointment, she began the “Mazingira Bora Afya Bora" campaign for the promotion of good health and a healthy environment.

The title song of her second album "Mungu Mkuu", won the 2015 Groove Awards Album of the Year.

From her third album titled "Matendo", the song "Tulia" a collaboration with Vick Kitonga Won 2016 groove awards collaboration of the year, "Nikufahamu" from the same album was nominated for Afrima in the category 'inspiration African female artist of the year 2016''. She won the 2016 Xtreem awards worship song of the year. The Sauti Awards U.S.A 2016 nominated her for East Africa female artist of the year.

In 2017, Wanjirū had two groove awards nominations; female artist and "Matendo" as album of the year, she was also nominated for Sauti Awards U.S.A. 2017 female artist of the year and Video of the year (Matendo).

In 2021, Wanjirū released her fifth album, Mwanga, which is Swahili for "Light." It was recorded live before an audience by her own label, Bwenieve, on August 30, 2021, at The Catholic University Of East Africa Auditorium. It consists of 12 audio - visual songs. The album was released on 24 November exclusively on Boomplay app.

In 2024, Wanjirū published her debut book, The Wait, where she shares her journey of hope, faith, and God’s timing. For a decade, she and her husband, Agundabweni Akweyu, wished for a child. Through seasons of doubt, steadfast faith, and persistent prayer, they learned to trust in God’s promises. Just when hope seemed out of reach, a miraculous blessing changed their lives forever.

Wanjirū has toured different countries like the United States, South Africa, Ghana, Zimbabwe, Tanzania, South Sudan, and Uganda. She has shared the same platforms in ministry alongside singers like Tasha Cobbs Leonard, Michael W. Smith, Nathaniel Bassey, Chandler Moore, Sinach, Mary Mary, and more. She did a collaboration titled "Sawa" with Zimbabwean gospel musician Tembalami and the song received a lot of airplay. She also collaborated with Mkhululi Bhebhe on his live recording in Johannesburg, South Africa, the medley "Hakuna Mungu kama wewe" and in Ghana collaborated with gospel singer Celestine Donkor.

On April 7, 2012, Wanjirū married producer Agundabweni Akweyu at Buruburu Baptist Church Nairobi, where her late father-in-law, Rev. Kenneth Akweyu, had served as a senior pastor. In their tenth year of marriage, they had their first son, Mshindi Akweyu Agundabweni, born on 6 April 2022. Wanjirū runs a fashion house named Bwenieve Clothesline, and oversees a mentorship program for aspiring musicians. Together with her husband, they run Bwenieve Production and other businesses.

== Discography ==
=== Albums ===
Waweza

Studio album by Evelyn Wanjirū
- Released: 2012
- Genres: Contemporary worship music, contemporary Christian music
- Length: 23:00
- Label: Bwenieve
- Producer: Agundabweni Akweyu

Mungu Mkuu

Studio album by Evelyn Wanjirū
- Released: 2015
- Genres: Contemporary worship music, contemporary Christian music
- Length: 58:00
- Label: Bwenieve
- Producer: Agundabweni Akweyu

Matendo

Studio album by Evelyn Wanjirū
- Released: 2017
- Genres: Contemporary worship music, contemporary Christian music
- Length: 32:00
- Label: Bwenieve
- Producer: Agundabweni Akweyu

Mwanga Album
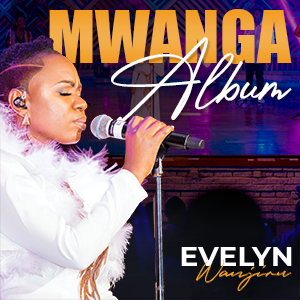

Live album by Evelyn Wanjiru
- Released: 2021
- Recorded: 30/08/2021
- Venue: C.U.E.A L.R.C Auditorium
- Genres: Contemporary worship music, contemporary Christian music
- Length: 2 hr 11 min
- Label: Bwenieve
- Producer: Agundabweni Akweyu

Year	Album	Notes
2012	Waweza	written by Wanjirū
2015	Mungu Mkuu	written by Wanjirū
2017	Matendo	written by Wanjirū
2019	Celebrate	written by Wanjirū
2021	Mwanaga	written by Wanjirū

Songs:

Waweza Album (2012)

1. Waweza
2. Unatosha
3. Hossana
4. Anthem
5. Namlauduon
6. Mazingira

Mungu Mkuu Album (2015)

1. Mungu Mkuu
2. Utukufu
3. Yaweh
4. Tunakuabudu
5. Ila damu yake yesu
6. Karibu Yesu
7. Nimwamini
8. Damu
9. All Glory
10. Neno Moja
11. Damu Medley

Matendo Album (2017)'

1. Nikufahamu
2. Baba Inuka
3. Tulia tf Vicky
4. Matendo
5. Halleluya
6. Sema Nami
7. Sawa ft Tembalami
8. Nilingoze
9. Subiri ft Mercy Masika & Emmy Kosgei

Celebrate Album (2019)'

1. Celebrate
2. Bless the Lord
3. Jehovah Elohim
4. Holy
5. It is Amazing
6. Nanyenyekea
7. Sitaogopa
8. I surrender

Mwanga Album (2021)'

1. Mwanga Album Intro 2. You're Worthy 3. Utukufu ( Live) 4. Mwanga 5. Nanyenyekea(Live) 6. Everlasting(Live) 7. Naringa na Yesu 8. Baba Inuka(Live) 9. Mungu Mkuu (Live) 10. Sifa Zitande 11. Umwema 12. Jehovah Elohim (Live) 13. Wonderful

=== Singles ===
1. Jehova Elohim
2. Its Amazing
3. Celebrate
4. Holy
5. Everlasting
6. No One Like You
7. Sitagopa
8. Worthy ft Eunice Njeri
9. Favour ft Celestine Donkor
10. Hakuna Mungu kama wewe ft Mkhululi Bhebhe

== Awards and nominations ==
Year	Association	Category	Nominated work	Result	Ref(s)
2020	Impact Awards	Honorary	Everlasting	Winner	
2020	Maranatha Awards	Best live ministration	Hakuna Mungu Kama wewe	Winner	
2019	Mwafaka Awards	Female Artist of the year	Celebrate	Winner	
2019	Groove Awards	Artist of the year	Celebrate	Nominee	
2019	Groove Awards	Worship song of the year	Celebrate	Nominee	
2019	Groove Awards	Song of the year	Celebrate	Nominee	
2018	Sauti Awards U.S.A	Worship song East, west, South Africa	Jehovah Elohim	Winner	
2018	Maranatha Awards	Female Artist of the year	Jehovah Elohim	Winner	
2018	Maranatha Awards	Collaboration of the year	Sawa	Winner	
2017	Groove Awards	Female Artist of the year	Matendo	Nominee	
2017	Groove Awards	Album of the year	Matendo	Nominee	
2017	Sauti Awards U.S.A	Female Artist of the year E.A	Matendo	Nominee	
2017	Sauti Awards U.S.A	Video of the year	Matendo	Nominee	
2016	Afrima Awards	Best female African inspirational	Nikufahamu	Nominee	
2016	Mwafaka Awards	Female artist of the year	Nikufahamu	Nominee	
2016	Mwafaka Awards	Collabo of the year	Tulia	Nominee	
2016	xtreem Awards	Female artist of the year	Nikufahamu	Nominee	
2016	xtreem Awards	Worship Song of the year	Nikufahamu	Nominee	
2016	Groove Awards	Worship Song of the year	Nikufahamu	Winner	
2016	Groove Awards	Female Artist of the year	Nikufahamu	Nominee	
2016	Groove Awards	Collabo of the year	Tulia	Winner	
2015	Groove Awards	Album of the year	Mungu Mkuu	Winner	
2015	Groove Awards	Female Artist of the year	Mungu Mkuu	Nominee	
2015	Groove Awards	Worship Song of the year	Mungu Mkuu	Nominee	
2015	Xtreem Awards	Worship Song of the year	Mungu Mkuu	Winner	
2015	Xtreem Awards	Collabo of the year	Tulia	Winner	
2015	Xtreem Awards	Female artist of the year	Mungu Mkuu	Nominee	
2015	Mwafaka Awards	Female Artist of the year	Mungu Mkuu	Nominee	
2015	Mwafaka Awards	Song of the year	Mungu Mkuu	Nominee	
2014	Xtreem Awards	Worship Song of the year	Waweza	Winner	
2014	Xtreem Awards	Central Kenya Artist of the year	Waweza	Winner	
2012	Groove Awards	Worship Song of the year	Waweza	Nominee	
