= Dosty =

Dosty is a surname. Notable people with the surname include:

- Andy Dosty, Ghanaian disc jockey and radio host
- Whitney Dosty (born 1988), American sitting volleyball player
