= Jayana =

Ghanaian gospel singer

- Born: Jemima Annor-Yeboah
- Genres: Gospel
- Occupations: Singer, songwriter, entrepreneur
- Years active: 2006–present

Jemima Annor-Yeboah, professionally known as Jayana, is a Ghanaian contemporary gospel singer, songwriter and entrepreneur. She was adjudged the female vocalist of the year in 2020 at the Ghana Urban Gospel Music Awards.

== Early life ==
Jemima Annor-Yeboah, known professionally as Jayana, was born into a family of singers. She is the second daughter of the late Bishop Dr. Augustine Annor-Yeboah, founder of Christian Praise International Centre (CPIC) and a former Chairman of the Christ Apostolic Church (CAC). She has four sisters: Mavis, Deborah, Karen, and Julie. During her formative years as the daughter of a Reverend minister, she spent part of her time listening to and learning contemporary gospel, as well as praise and worship music.

== Music career ==
Jayana participated in the inaugural season of the Ghanaian music talent show Charterhouse's Stars of the Future, where she competed alongside Efya, Irene Logan, Ramzy Prince and others and was among the finalists of the show's first season

She has performed on major platforms; in 2007 she performed at the Vodafone Ghana Music Awards industrial awards night and has since collaborated and performed alongside numerous Ghanaian musicians, including, Joyce Blessing, Grace Ashy, Selina Boateng, Shatta Wale, Kuami Eugene, KiDi,

In 2019 she released a single titled Victory featuring Joyce Blessing.

In 2020 during the COVID-19 lock down period in Ghana, she released 'I Believe' as a motivational single to Ghanaians. She also released her current song titled 'Who You Are'

== Discography ==
Singles

- Victory
- Who You Are
- I Believe
- Awurade [God]
- Gye W'ayeyi featuring Aduhemaa
- He Reigns

== Awards and nomination ==
Year	Event	Award	Nominated work	Result	Ref
2019	Emerging Music Awards	Female Vocalist Of The Year	Herself	Nominated	
2019	Emerging Music Awards	Gospel Artiste Of The Year	Herself	Nominated	
2019	Emerging Music Awards	Emerging Artiste Of The Year	Herself	Nominated	
2020	Ghana Urban Gospel Music Awards	Gospel Female Artiste Of The Year	Herself	Nominated	
2020	Ghana Urban Gospel Music Awards	Female Vocalist Of The Year	Herself	Won	

- Jayana wins Female Vocalist of the Year at Ghana National Gospel Music Awards
- Jayana signs ambassadorial deal with Amanex Company Ltd
- Jayana is brand ambassador for Ageless Day Spa
