= Okese1 =

African music artist

Okese1 Afrane Frank
- Also known as: Okese1
- Born: Afrane Frank; February 21, 1997 (age 28); Accra, Ghana
- Genres: Hip hop, Afrobeat
- Occupation: Rapper,
- Years active: 2020 – present
- Labels: NYRB/TBF Productions
- Website: www.okese1music.com

Afrane Frank (born 21 February 1997) known by the stage name Okese1 is a Ghanaian rapper and hip hop musician.

== Early life ==
Okese1 hails from Bonwire, a suburb of Ejisu-Juaben Municipal District, a town in the Ashanti Region of Ghana. He had his senior high school education at Anglican Senior High School, Kumasi. He then proceeded to the University of Cape Coast for his tertiary education.

== Music career ==
Okese1 debuted in the music scene in Ghana in 2020 with his debut single and video YIE YIE. He became a nationwide artiste after his 2020 single Yie Yie went viral in Kumasi and later the whole nation. Soon after its release, ‘Yie Yie‘ topped the chart on Boomplay ‘s Top 100 Okese 1 is the CEO of Amotia Geng, a group he founded by himself and his Kumasi squad. He is also a member of Arab Money Gang which is owned by rapper and business man Criss Waddle.

== Controversy ==
He got into a banter with radio presenter Andy Dosty after being late for an interview which got him sacked from the studio's of Hitz FM in Accra. He also got into a social media banter with fellow rapper Medikal and called him a sellout.

In March 2024, Medikal, a colleague rapper of Okese1 allegedly says that, Frank has loss his Father, Dog and want to sell his House. He also said his Range Rover has gotten burned.

== Discography ==
- Okese1 - Hustle ft. Medikal - 2020
- Okese1 - Young Rich Nigga ft. AMG Armani
- Okese1 - Amount - 2020
- Okese1 - YIE YIE - 2020
- Okese1 - WOSO - 2020
- Okese1 - Silence Freestyle - 2020
- Okese1 - Na Today - 2020
- Okese1 - MOMO - 2021
- Trapper - 2021
- The Goat - 2021
- Opp - 2022

== Awards and nominations ==
Year	Organization	Recipient/Nominated work	Award	Result	Ref
2021	3 Music Awards	Yie Yie	Hip Hop Song Of The Year	Nominated	
