= Twum =

Twum is a surname. Notable people with the surname include:

- Ceccy Twum, Ghanaian singer and songwriter
- Isaac Twum (born 1998), Ghanaian footballer
- Monica Twum (born 1978), Ghanaian track and field sprinter
