= KOJOBLAK =

Ghanaian musician (born 2001)

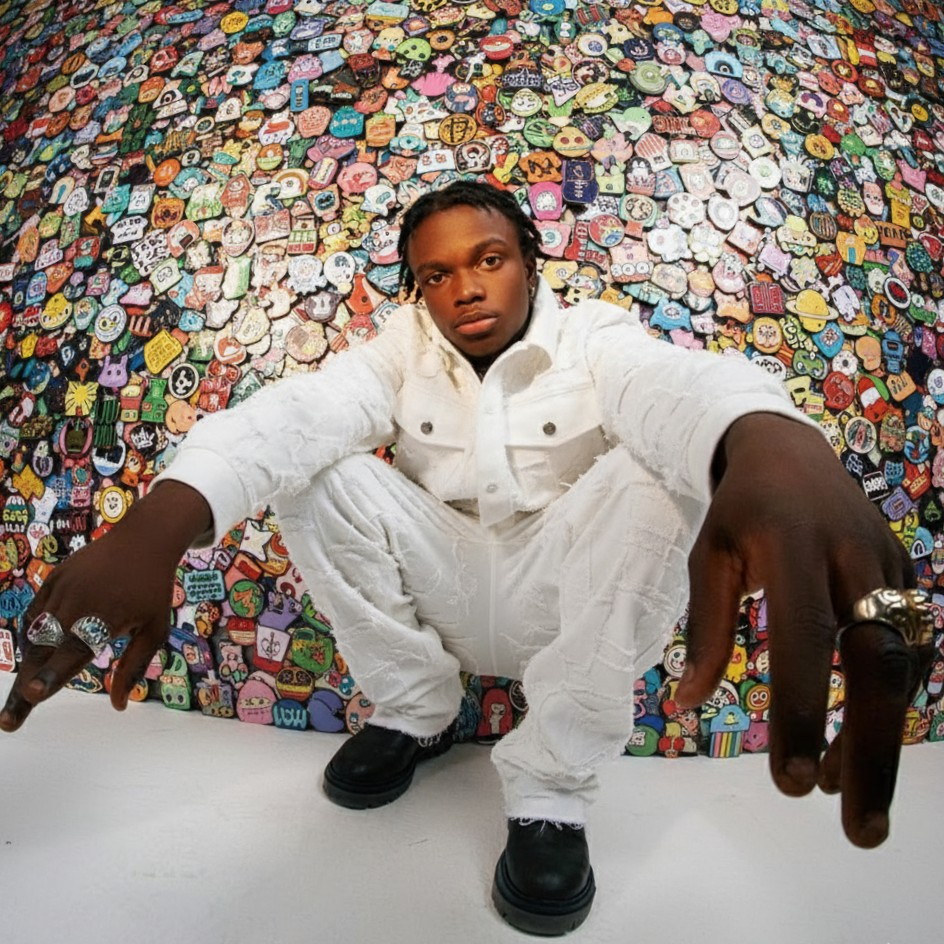

Background information
- Born: McDonald Addotey Braide; July 23, 2001 (age 25); Dansoman, Accra, Ghana
- Genres: Afrobeats, Afrofusion, Highlife
- Occupations: Singer, songwriter
- Years active: 2023–present
- Label: Blue Magic/Encore Recordings

McDonald Addotey Braide (born July 23, 2001) also known as KOJOBLAK is Ghanaian singer and songwriter known for his work in Afrofusion.

== Early life and education ==
KOJOBLAK was born and raised in Dansoman in the Greater Accra Region of Ghana. He developed an interest in music during his teenage years, influenced by notable artists such as Michael Jackson and E.T. Mensah. He began his musical journey under the name Toy Boy as part of a music group called BMT during his time at St. Thomas Aquinas Senior High School. After going solo, he joined the Christ Embassy Church choir, where he honed his vocal skills before adopting the stage name KOJOBLAK.

== Career ==
In 2023, KOJOBLAK signed a record deal with Blue Magic Records and Encore Recordings with whom he released his debut EP, "757", on May 15, 2024. In 2024, the single "Excellent" featuring Kelvyn Boy, received significant airplay in Ghana.

In February 2025, KOJOBLAK released the song "Next Door" featuring Ghanaian rapper Sarkodie.

His second EP, "131", released in 2025, includes collaborations with Sarkodie, Kelvyn Boy, and Ugandan artist Joshua Baraka.

KOJO BLAK has worked on songs by Sarkodie, Kelvyn Boy, Mr Drew, Joshua Baraka, OliveTheBoy, Moliy, Larruso, King Promise , Joeboy and others.

== Discography ==
=== EPs ===
- "757" (2023)
- "131" (2025)

=== Selected Singles ===
- "Gear" with Chop Daily (2024)
- "Rugged 2.0" ft Olivetheboy (2024)
- "Excellent" ft Kelvyn Boy (2024)
- "Next Door" ft Sarkodie (2025
- "Sailor" ft Oxlade (2026)
- "Ability" ft Medikal (2026)

== Awards ==
=== Ghana Music Award 2026 ===
KOJOBLAK received 9 nominations but won the Best New Artiste Award at the 27th Telecel Ghana Music Awards. He also received the Best Afrobeats song Award for his song "Excellent" at the 27th Telecel Ghana Music Awards.
