= Kwaku Gyasi =

Ghanaian gospel singer (born 1977)

Kwaku Gyasi (born 17 December 1977) is a Ghanaian gospel singer. His third album 'Ayeyi' was nominated for the 6th Ghana Music Awards. He won four awards during the 2007 edition of the Vodafone Ghana Music Awards.

== Early life and education ==
Kwaku was born to Angelina Appiah and Kwame Kyei, both traders from Elmina. He grew up at Asafo in Kumasi. He started School at APS and later attended the Kumasi Technical Institute (KTI) where he graduated in 1996.

== Music career ==
He discovered his talent of singing and playing of numerous musical instruments and decided to start his music career with the help of Elder Mireku, Elder Sarpong and the Church of Pentecost. His first two albums were 'Sumsum Kronkron Gya' and 'Onkwafoo'. He later added other albums like 'Ayeyi' and 'Onyame Aseda' to his songlist.

== Personal life ==
He is married to Mercy Adu Poku.

== Awards and nominations ==
=== Vodafone Ghana Music Awards ===
Year	Nominee / work	Award	Result
2007	'Onyame Aseda'	Gospel song of the year	Won
2007	'Onyame Aseda'	Gospel album of the year	Won
2007	Himself	Gospel artist of the year	Won
2007	'Ade Akye Abia' featuring Christiana Love	Best Collaboration of the Year	Won
