= Selina Boateng =

Ghanaian gospel musician

- Born: Selina Boateng
- Genres: Gospel
- Occupations: Singer, songwriter

Selina Boateng is a Ghanaian gospel musician.

== Career ==
Selina undertook a tour of some prisons with Prophet Albert Asihene-Arjarquah in 2014. Her ability to sing in French and English has provided her the opportunity to minister in countries like France, Belgium, Norway and Germany. Locally, Selina has been on programs with artists like DSP Kofi Sarpong, Nacee, Ceccy Twum, KODA, Joe Mettle, Eugene Zuta, Ohemaa Mercy and Rev Cynthia McCauley.

== Awards and nominations ==
Selina was awarded with the 2012 VGMA Gospel Song of the Year. She also won four awards at the Ghana Gospel Industry Awards (GGIA) (2nd Edition) staged by Adom FMAdom FM. The awards were for the Artiste of the Year, Album of the Year, Song of the Year ('Menku Meho') and Popular Video of the Year. With her song 'Alpha & Omega' featuring Uncle Ato, Selina won the Gospel Song of the Year in 2015. In 2019, a song she was featured on by TKC, was nominated for the Urban Song of the Year ('Ayeyi' - meaning Praise).

== Personal life ==
Selina has one sibling and is married to Isaac Berchie since December 2019.

== Major Singles ==
- Medɔfo Pa (meaning - My Dear)
- Menku Meho (meaning - I won't kill myself)
- Alpha and Omega
- Eda Papa (meaning - Good day)
- Wobɛyɛ Nhyira (meaning - You will be a blessing)
- Obɛyɛ Amawo (meaning - He will do it for you)
- Yesu Mogya (meaning - Blood of Jesus)
