= Bout U =

Single by Rema
- Released: April 11, 2025
- Genre: Rnb; Afrobeats; pop
- Length: 2:43
- Label: Mavin; Jonzing
- Songwriters: Divine Ikubor; Michael Ovie
- Producer: London

Rema singles chronology
"Baby (Is It a Crime)" (2025)	"Bout U" (2025)	"Kelebu" (2025)

"Bout U" is a song by Nigerian singer and rapper Rema. It was released as a single under Mavin Records and Jonzing World on April 11, 2025. The song was written by Rema alongside London, who also serves as the song's producer.

== Background ==
On April 3, 2025, Rema previewed "Bout U" on his social media accounts, sharing a brief snippet that garnered significant online attention. The song subsequently went viral prior to its official release on April 11, 2025.

== Critical reception ==
The song "Bout U" received generally positive reviews from music critics. New Wave Magazine described it as a smooth, emotionally charged ballad featuring an infectious guitar riff. It praised the song's stripped-back arrangement, which allows Rema's vocals to take center stage, showcasing his raw and intimate delivery. According to New Wave Magazine, Rema's ability to blend Afrobeats, R&B, and pop is reaffirmed. Meanwhile, Uproxx's Aaron Williams characterized the song as having "slinky vibes" with nods to 80s samples.

== Charts ==
Chart performance for "Bout U"
Chart (2025)	Peak position
Nigeria (TurnTable Top 100)	2
UK Afrobeats (Official Charts)	4
US Afrobeats Songs (Billboard)	5

== Certifications ==
Certifications for "Bout U"
Region	Certification	Certified units/sales
Nigeria (TCSN)	Platinum	100,000^{‡}
^{‡} Sales+streaming figures based on certification alone.

== Release history ==
Release dates and formats for "Bout U"
Region	Date	Format	Label	Ref.
Various	11 April 2025	Digital download; Streaming	Mavin Records; Jonzing World	
