= Highly Spiritual Music =

Ghanaian independent record label

- Founded: 2017
- Founder: Kaywa
- Status: Active
- Genre: Various
- Country of origin: Ghana
- Location: Tema, Greater Accra Region

Highly Spiritual Music (HSM) is a Ghanaian independent record label and entertainment company headquartered in Tema, Ghana. It was founded in 2017 by sound engineer and producer Kaywa.

== History ==
Kaywa established the label in 2017 in Tema with the goal of developing and releasing music from Ghanaian artists under a single imprint. During its early years the company signed a number of artists from programmes such as MTN Hitmaker and released collaborative singles including a track by “Highly Spiritual Music Allstars” featuring Kuami Eugene.

The Ghanaian label Highly Spiritual Music (HSM), introduced four newly signed artists—Cadeen, Joevibe, Shugalord and JoyVerse—with the joint single “All Day” on 23 June 2023.

== Operations and artists ==
Highly Spiritual Music has engaged in artist management, production, and distribution activities, operating from its office on Kestrel Street in Tema. Its roster has included artists such as Mr Drew and Lasmid, the latter of whom officially parted ways with the label in 2023.
