= Is It a Crime =

Is It a Crime may refer to:

- "Is It a Crime" (Sade song), 1985
- "Is It a Crime" (Mariah the Scientist and Kali Uchis song), 2025
- "Baby (Is It a Crime)", by Rema, 2025

== See also ==
- Iz It a Crime?, 2025 album by Snoop Dogg
