= O'Kenneth =

Rapper, Singer, Songwriter, Producer

- Born: Kenneth Opoku; August 13, 1999 (age 27); Suame-Maakro, Kumasi
- Other names: YGA O’Kenneth, Drah Zah Gul
- Education: Tepa Senior High School
- Occupations: Rapper, Singer, Songwriter, Producer
- Years active: 2018–present
- Organization: YGA O'Kenneth Management
- Notable work: Lonely Road ft Xlimkid Agyeiwaa ft. Reggie, City Boy Yimaye
- Musical career
- Genres: Hip hop; trap; Drill
- Label: YGA O'Kenneth Management

Kenneth Opoku (born August 13, 1998), known professionally as YGA O'Kenneth, is a rapper, singer, drill artist, and a songwriter from Ghana. He is regarded as one of the most influential hip hop artists from Kumasi due to his progressive musical styles and socially conscious songwriting. Born and raised in Kumasi, Ashanti Region, O'Kenneth began his musical career in 2016 in Kumasi, Ashanti region, and quickly gained local attention, which led to him signing a recording contract with Life Living Records in 2019. O'Kenneth rose to prominence in 2020 with his verses on the songs "Sore" and "Akatafoc," both of which featured Yaw Tog and Kawabanga.

In 2021 he released "Until It's All Said and Done," a conscious drill record, as his debut studio album. The album received positive reviews and featured singles such as "Loosing Grace Ft Reggie", "Gimme Dat" and "Hopez Ft Jay Bahd, Skyface SDW and Chicogod". In 2022, he released his second studio album "Straight Outta Kumerica 2" with Reggie under the aegis of Life Living Records. The album, which featured the singles "Pa!", "Loading," and "Timing" and was heavily influenced by Drill and gangsta rap, received widespread critical acclaim.

O'Kennth is one of the pioneers who brought the Asakaa genre of music to light as a member of the group (Asakaa Boys) that started the Kumerican movement. Asakaa thus refers to the group's ability to speak and use street slang on each track.

== Early life and career ==
Kenneth Opoku was born on August 13, 1998, in Santasi, Ashanti Region, to Ghanaian parents. He grew up in Suame with his parents and siblings. Although he was not a member of a gang, he grew up around street gang members, which he claimed in an interview was the source of his musical language. While still a teenager, he was admitted to Tepa Senior High School in Tepa, Ashanti Region, where he studied General science. At Tepa Senior High School, he began his musical career. He has been a working musician since 2016. He admitted that American rapper Kendrick Lamar served as his inspiration and that he initially began by freestyling. O'Kenneth revealed during an interview on The Delay Show with Deloris Frimpong Manso that he comes from a happy home and that his parents had wanted him to pursue a formal career and further his education. His parents did not, however, support his decision to pursue a career in entertainment because they believed it might not be a good fit for him and that he should instead pursue something else.

He is a member of Asakaa, a drill music group in Kumasi that was established as a result of random men stopping by to record at the "Trap House," which is where the "Life Living" home studio in Kumasi, run by Sean Lifer and Rabby Jones, is located. With his verses on songs by Asakaa members like Sean Life's "Ma drip" and Jay Bahd's "condemn," O'Kenneth rose to prominence in the Ghanaian music scene in 2020. Later, he was a featured artist on Yaw Tog's "Sore" and Kawabanga's "Akatafoc" songs, which helped Asakaa become well known in Ghana and other nations. In addition to his numerous songs, YGA has three External Play albums: "Until It's All Said and Done," a solo EP; "Straight Outta Kumerica" and "Straight Outta Kumerica 2," joint EPs with Reggie. He's also known for his single "Agyeiwaa", "Obaa Hemaa ", and "Cinderella" where he collaborated with Skyface SDW, Beeztrap KOTM and the Asakaa Boys.

== Discography ==
=== Studio album's ===
- Straight Outta Kumerica – Joint EP (O’Kenneth & Reggie released on August 27, 2020)
- Until It's All Said and Done (December 18, 2021).
- Straight Outta Kumerica II – Joint EP (O’Kenneth & Reggie released on July 20, 2022)
- PAIN IN GLORY - Joint EP (O'Kenneth & Xlimkid released on October 27, 2023)

=== Song catalog ===
- Breaks
- Gang ft. Reggie.
- All Eyes ft. Reggie.
- Stakes ft. Jay Bahd
- Skyface SDW ft O'Kenneth – Obaa Hemaa
- Bust – (& Reggie)
- Loading – (& Reggie) ft. G4 Boyz
- M.O.B – (& Reggie)
- Ya Parke – O’kenneth & Reggie
- Calling ft. Kawabanga, O’kenneth, Jay Bahd, Sean Lifer, Reggie & City Boy.
- Losing Grace ft. Reggie.
- Hopez ft. Jay Bahd, Skyface SDW & Chicogod.
- Lotta Guan ft. Chicogod
- Nante ft. Jay Bahd.
- Gaza ft. Reggie, Terrist Carter, Cartnez & Jay Bahd.
- Till Finish ft. Thywill.
- Wishie Wishie ft. Bra Benk, Reggie & Terrist Carter.
- Gimmie Dat – Thomas The Great, Terrist Carter, Chicogod, Sparkle, Kawabanga,
- Reggie & Jay Bahd.
- Agyeiwaa ft. Reggie & City Boy
- Pain in Glory - O'kenneth & Xlimkid
- Maranatha - O’kenneth & Chicogod
- Yimaye

=== Concerts Played ===
Title	Location	Year	Ref
Black Star Line festival	Accra, Ghana	2023	
Afrochella	Accra, Ghana	2020	
Made in Kumerica Concert	Kumasi	2022	
"Wizkid Live" Concert	Accra Sports Stadium, Ghana	2022	
