= JZyNO =

Liberian singer and songwriter

- Born: Jonathan Lee Pratt; 3 January 1995 (age 31); Buchanan, Grand Bassa County, Liberia
- Citizenship: Liberian
- Occupations: Singer; songwriter
- Years active: 2019–present
- Awards: Full list

Jonathan Lee Pratt (born 3 January 1995), known professionally as JZyNO, is a Liberian singer and songwriter from Buchanan. He currently resides in Ghana and is known for the hit single "Butta My Bread", which features vocals by Ghanaian musician Lasmid.

== Early life and career ==
Jonathan Lee Pratt was born on 3 January 1995, in Buchanan, Grand Bassa County, to a Liberian-Portuguese father and a Nigerien-Liberian mother. He has cited Kendrick Lamar, Wizkid, and Bryson Tiller as his key musical influences. JZyNO's first song to gain recognition was the 2019 single "Kpan Kpan Me". He later released the single "Butta My Bread", which features vocals by Ghanaian singer Lasmid. The song debuted at number 50 on the Billboard U.S. Afrobeats Songs chart, making it their first entry on the chart. "Butta My Bread" also peaked at number 16 on the UK Afrobeats Singles Chart in 2023, spending four weeks on the chart. In 2023, JZyNO won four awards at the Liberia Music Awards and released the amapiano single "Yakunay".

== Awards and nominations ==
Organization	Year	Award	Recipient or nominee	Result	Ref.
Liberia Music Awards	2023	Afro Pop Artist of the Year	Himself	Won	
Liberia Music Awards	2023	Afro Pop Artist of the Year	"Butta My Bread"	Won	
Telecel Ghana Music Awards	2024	Best African Artiste of the Year	Himself	Nominated	

== Discography ==
=== Singles ===
- "Butta My Bread" (featuring Lasmid) (2023)
- "Kpan Kpan Me (Angelina)" (2019)
- "Mood" (featuring Khaid) (2024)
- "Eyes on You" (featuring Camidoh) (2023)
- "Fall Down Inside" (featuring Medikal) (2022)
- "Onana" (2022)
- "Mamie Watta" (2021)
- ''Go Down'' (featuring The Game) (2025)
- ''Asor'' (Amerado ft JZyNO) (2025)
- "Yakunay" (2023)

== See also ==
- List of Liberian musicians
