= Kweku Smoke =

Ghanaian rapper and songwriter

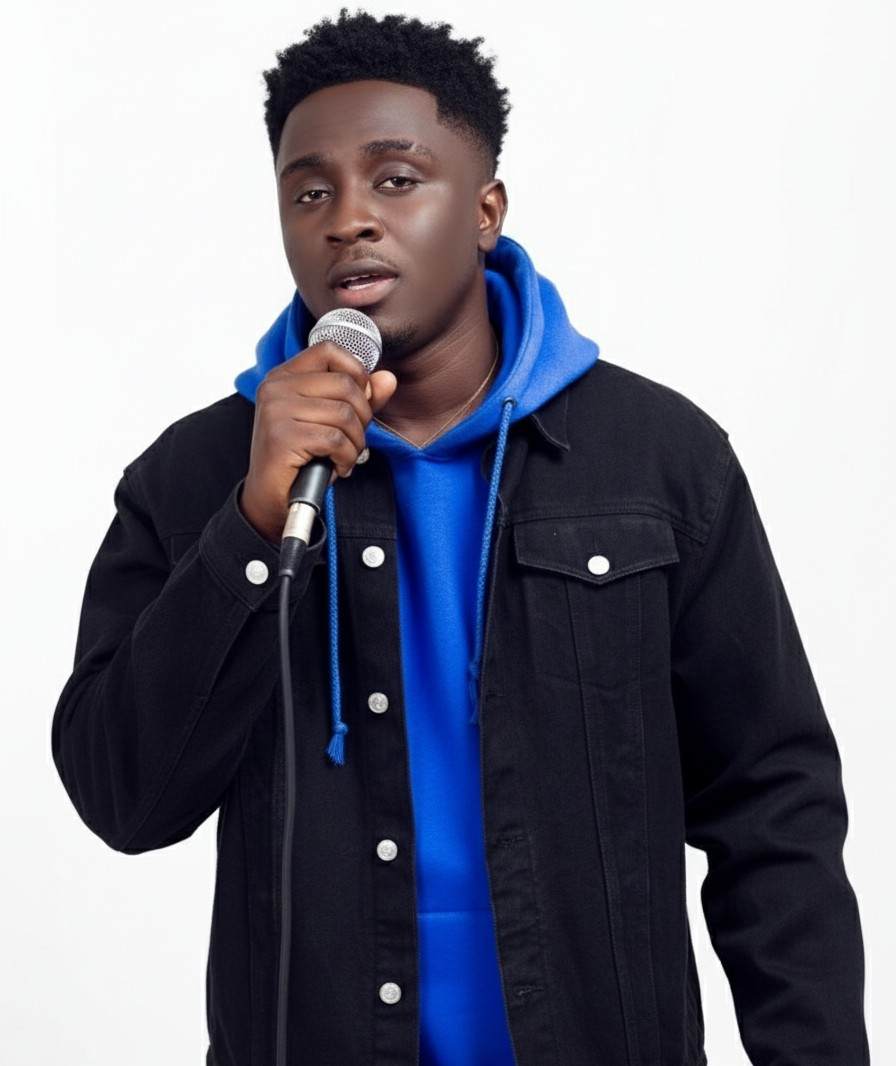
- Performing in 2024

Background information
- Born: Paul Amankwah Ghana
- Origin: Accra, Ghana
- Genres: Hip hop; Hiplife; Trap
- Occupations: Rapper; Singer; Songwriter
- Years active: 2018–present
- Label: Africori

Paul Amankwah, known professionally as Kweku Smoke is a Ghanaian rapper and songwriter.

== Early life and education ==
He attended Victory International School for basic education, then Benkum Senior High School, and later studied at the Kwame Nkrumah University of Science and Technology (KNUST). During part of his early career he released freestyle under the name YRS.

== Music career ==
In 2019, Kweku Smoke gained wider recognition after a studio introduction let him meet Sarkodie. The collaboration on the track "Yedin" helped bring him to more public attention.

He released the album kweku Jesus on 8 March 2024; it achieved commercial success shortly after release, including reaching no. 1 on iTunes in Ghana.

Later in 2024, he released Born In Hell, a project consisting of 10 track, described as more introspective in detailing personal hardship and growth.

Kweku smoke held a headline concert called "The Revival" on 18 December 2024 at GHUD park near Accra Mall. It included other Ghanaian artist on stage, and some of his popular song were performed.

== Awards and recognition ==
At the 26th Telecel Ghana Music Awards, Kweku Smoke won:

- Best Rap Performance (for Holy Ghost)
- Best Hip Hop Song (for Holy Ghost)
- Best Hip Hop/Hiplife Artist
- He has also been nominated in other categories at TGMA, including Artiste of the Year and Album of the Year.

== Themes and style ==
Kweku smoke's lyrics open address is personal experiences, including struggles growing up, poverty, resilience, and street life. His music blends Twi, English, and Pidgin.

== Personal life ==
He has spoken in lyrics and interviews about growing up in Berekum and naming a rice seller ("Yaayaa") whose generosity during his early hardship featured in his song Holy Ghost.

Apart from music he has been involved in other ventures for example operating a shuttle service for students at KNUST.

== Discography ==
=== Albums ===
Tape	Year of Release
Playman	2023
He's Just Different	2023
Kweku Jesus	2024
Born in Hell	2024
Walk With Me	2025
No Days Off	2026

=== EPs ===
EP	Year of Release
We Rage	2022
Big Shmoke	2022
Old Compound	2023
Eye Red	2024

=== Selected Singles and Notable Songs ===
- Holy Ghost
- Agyekum
- Nkwanehia
- Yedin — collaborated with Sarkodie
- Akata featuring Bosom P-Yung.
- Airhu — ft. Bosom P-Yung.
- Dis Side— ft. Kofi Mole.
- You Dey Talk

Title	Year	Type	Featured Artist(s)	Album / Project
"Yedin"	2019	Single	Sarkodie	—
"Airhu"	2020	Single	Bosom P-Yung	—
"Akata"	2020	Single	Bosom P-Yung	—
"Dis Side"	2020	Single	Kofi Mole	—
"You Dey Talk"	2021	Single	—	—
"Self Employed"	2021	Single	—	—
"King Dave"	2021	Single	—	—
"Lost Title"	2022	Single	—	—
"Take Me Somewhere Happy"	2022	Single	—	—
"Holy Ghost"	2024	Track	—	Born In Hell
"No Complaining"	2024	Track	—	Born In Hell
"Dreams"	2024	Track	—	Born In Hell
"Regrets"	2024	Track	—	Born In Hell
"Nkwanehia"	2024	Track	—	Born In Hell
"Reserved Seat"	2024	Track	—	Born In Hell
"My Youth"	2024	Track	—	Born In Hell
"Higher"	2024	Track	—	Born In Hell
"Cheddar"	2024	Track	—	Born In Hell

== Awards and nominations ==
Year	Organization	Category	Nominated work	Result	Ref
2025	Vodafone Ghana Music Award	Artist Of The Year	Holy Ghost	Nominated	
2025	Vodafone Ghana Music Award	Best Hiplife/HipHop Artiste	Holy Ghost	Nominated	
2025	Vodafone Ghana Music Award	Best Rap Performance	Holy Ghost	Nominated	
2025	Vodafone Ghana Music Award	Best HipHop Song	Holy Ghost	Nominated	

== No Days Off Album ==
The No Days Off album dropped on Friday, September 4, 2026. The album contains 13 songs with features from Ghanaian musicians like Lasmid, Kwesi Arthur and Real Dikoo. The album serves as a statement of intent in an industry where momentum can be very shot, Kweku Smoke emphasizes on continuous creation of songs for his fans.
