= Kelebu =

Single by Rema
- Released: August 1, 2025
- Genre: Afrobeats
- Length: 2:52
- Label: Mavin; Jonzing
- Songwriters: Divine Ikubor; Michael Ovie
- Producers: London; Ambezza

Rema singles chronology
"Bout U" (2025)	"Kelebu" (2025)	"Fun" (2025)

Music video
- "Kelebu" on YouTube

"Kelebu" is a song by Nigerian singer and rapper Rema. It was released as a single under Mavin Records and Jonzing World on August 1, 2025 as his third single of the year. The song was written by Rema alongside London, who serves alongside Ambezza as the song's co-producer.

== Background ==
Rema stated that "Kelebu" draws inspiration from his childhood experiences, where he listened to diverse household music and danced to Caribbean and Francophone tracks at school parties, often without understanding the lyrics but enjoying the instrumental and repetitive elements. He described reliving those moments by expressing them through his music.

== Release and promotion ==
The song was released on 1 August 2025, following Rema's singles "Baby (Is It a Crime)" in February and "Bout U" in April. To promote the track, Rema announced a $10,000 dance challenge on X, encouraging fans to create an easy dances for the song. The challenge generated significant engagement, with thousands of posts on TikTok.

== Composition ==
"Kelebu" is a rhythmic, chant-driven song featuring frenetic percussion, horns, brash bass, and repetitive choruses. It mixes traditional African sounds with contemporary Afrobeats production, creating a spiritual, danceable, and celebratory vibe similar to Rema's earlier track "Ozeba".

== Critical reception ==
Critics praised "Kelebu" for its electrifying energy and fusion of sounds. HotNewHipHop described it as "one of the most impactful, exciting, and propulsive singles you'll hear this week," highlighting its textured percussion and celebratory feel. Pitchfork noted it as a high-energy track. Rolling Stone called it raucous and horn-driven.

== Accolades ==
Year	Awards ceremony	Award description(s)	Results
2026	Ghana Music Awards	African Song of the Year	Pending

== Charts ==
Chart performance for "Kelebu"
Chart (2025)	Peak position
Nigeria (TurnTable Top 100)	5
UK Afrobeats (Official Charts)	7
US Afrobeats Songs (Billboard)	9

== Release history ==
Release dates and formats for "Kelebu"
Region	Date	Format	Label	Ref.
Various	1 August 2025	Digital download; Streaming	Mavin Records; Jonzing World	
