= Yaw Sarpong =

Ghanaian gospel musician and songwriter (died 2026)

- Born: Accra, Ghana
- Died: 20 January 2026 (aged 66) Ghana
- Genre: Gospel
- Occupation: Musician · Songwriter
- Instrument: Vocals
- Years active: 1970s–2026

Yaw Sarpong (died 20 January 2026) was a Ghanaian gospel musician and songwriter. He was the leader of the Asomafo Band.

== Life and career ==
Sarpong was born in Accra but lived in Akyease after the death of his father who was Member of Parliament during President Kwame Nkrumah's overthrow.

His ministry began in the early 1970s. Through his inspirations, he then founded the Yaw Sarpong and Asomafo Band in 1986.

Sarpong was married and had children. He died on 20 January 2026.

== Awards ==
Sarpong was awarded the Lifetime Achievement award at the 2025 Telecel Ghana Music Awards.
