= Groove Awards =

Kenyan gospel music award

Groove Award
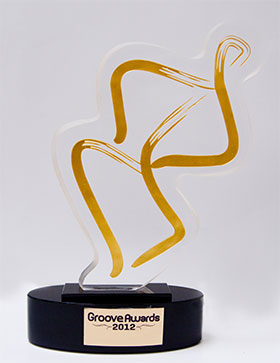
- Groove Awards trophy 2012
- Awarded for: Outstanding achievements in the African Christian music industry
- Country: Kenya
- Presented by: Groove Awards
- First award: 2004
- Website: home.grooveawards.co.ke

The Groove Awards is a Kenyan annual Gospel award. The winners are chosen by the public. The award's coverage has spread to include other East African countries, including Rwanda. It is sponsored by Safaricom and MoSound Events.

== History ==
The first Groove Awards were presented in 2004, at a small gathering. Kevin Mulei is the founder of the groove awards. It has since grown to be a live-broadcast event courtesy of media sponsors. To date, more than 1,200 artists/groups have been nominated and 270 Groove statuettes presented to exemplary Gospel musicians in Kenya and the larger East African region. The 8th awards ceremony, held on 1 June 2013, was attended by President Uhuru Kenyatta. The ceremony takes place annually in Nairobi.

== Groove Camp ==
Initiated in 2013, Groove Camp, a 3-day annual forum, unites, equips and raises the standards of gospel musicians and gatekeepers by equipping them with relevant skills to improve their craft and ministry. The camp draws more than 150 artists and 15 facilitators who tackle issues concerning the music ministry and industry.

The second Annual Groove Camp was held in April 2014 and featured new and seasoned gospel artists, many of whom were named nominees of the 2014 Groove Awards. Borrowing from the Groove Awards 2014 theme, 'Let Your Light Shine' (LYLS), derived from Matthew 5:16, the camp's purpose was to ignite in the hearts and minds of artists, a conversation that will keep burning throughout the year.

Attendance at the Groove Camp is by application.

== Groove Tours ==
Each year, Groove Awards nominees stage performances in selected towns and cities in Kenya to popularize the upcoming awards and win the public's favour. These events are sponsored by Safaricom and are broadcast to the public live on partner mainstream tv stations K24 TV and previously on NTV and KTN

== Categories ==
There are 19 categories of awards in 2018.

1. Artist Of The Year
2. Song Of The Year
3. Teen Choice Song Of The Year
4. Breakthrough Song Of The Year
5. Hiphop Song Of The Year
6. Reggae Or Ragga Song Of The Year
7. Praise and Worship Song Of The Year
8. Collabo Of The Year
9. Video Of The Year
10. Dance Song of the Year
11. Personality of the Year
12. HypeMan/Mc of the Year
13. Breakthrough DJ Of The Year
14. Song Of The Year Rift Counties
15. Song Of The Year Coastal Counties
16. Song Of The Year Eastern Counties
17. Song Of The Year Western Counties
18. Song Of The Year Central Counties
19. Song Of The Year Nyanza Counties
20. Outstanding contributor of the Year
21. Skiza ringback tone of the Year
22. Songwriter of the Year
