= Ayisi =

Ghanaian rapper (born 1986)

- Also known as: A.I
- Born: Emmanuel Kwadwo Oware; 21 July 1986 (age 40); Accra
- Origin: Koforidua, Ghana
- Genres: Highlife; reggae; hip hop; RnB; high life
- Occupation: Musician
- Instrument: Vocals
- Years active: 2012–present
- Labels: Globewaves , Efritete , 2ligit records, Ayisi music (current)

Emmanuel Kwadwo Oware (born 21 July 1986), better known by his stage name Ayisi (formerly A.I) is a Ghanaian Afro Pop, Hip Hop and Hip-Life artiste.

== Life and music career ==
Ayisi pronounced 'ayisi' was born in Accra, capital of Ghana begun recording in his High school days at Presbyterian Boys' Secondary School in 2004. Before that his nursery days were at Ave Maria and then later on to Presec Staff Primary and then to St Andrews. Ayisi discovered his love for music at an early age through his father who was a drummer in a band and had a vast number of collections he would delve into. He liked to write a lot and would use the habit to polish his lyrical skills. Ayisi is a sibling to three. Ayisi is inspired by music from Tupac, Biggie Smalls, Eminem, Bob Marley, Youssou Ndour just to mention a few. Ayisi release Mixtape Mayhem under 2ligit records and Headstrong EP.

== Discography ==
=== Albums ===
- Mixtape Mayhem (2014)
- Headstrong EP (2016)
- Linkop EP (2020)
- The Unbroken (2022)

== Videography ==
- Anger Management by A.I
- Grind - Vision Dj featuring A.I
- Moving On by A.I
- Prayer by Ayisi
- Blessings by Ayisi

== Awards ==
Year	Awards Ceremony	Award Presented	Work	Result	Ref
2023	Global Music Awards South Africa	Unsung Artist	Himself	Nominated	
2020	Vodafone Ghana Music Awards	Afrobeat Song Of the Year	Adwuma (E.l ft A.I)	Nominated	
2017	Vodafone Ghana Music Awards	AfroPop Song Of The Year	Grind	Nominated	
2013	Vodafone Ghana Music Awards	Best HipHop/Rnb Song Of the Year	Anger Management	Won	
