= King Paluta =

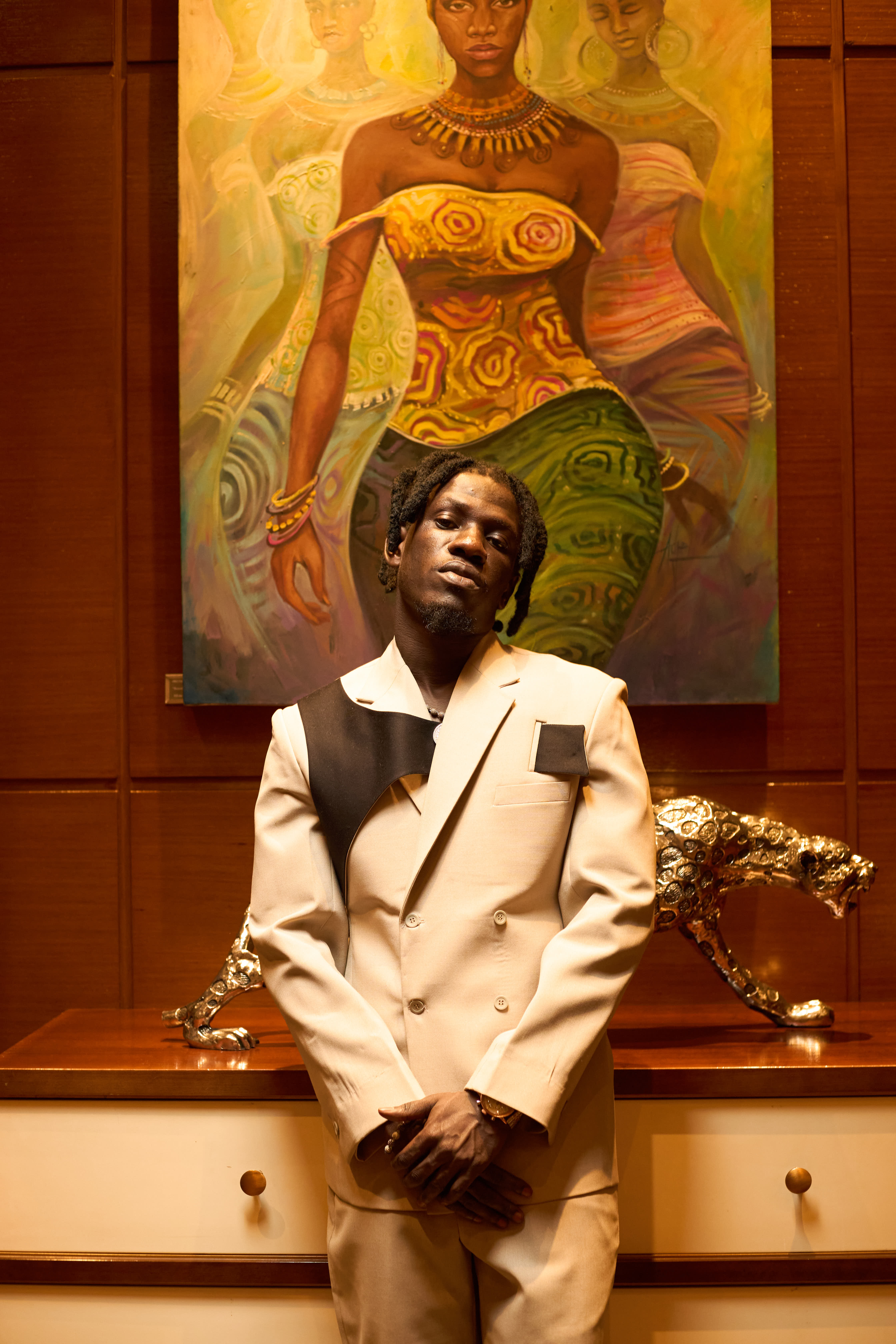

Background information
- Also known as: King Paluta
- Born: Thomas Adjei Wireko; January 27, 1992 (age 34); Atonsu, Kumasi, Ghana
- Genres: Hip hop; Hiplife; Highlife
- Occupations: Rapper, singer, songwriter
- Years active: 2016–present

Thomas Adjei Wireko, professionally known as King Paluta, is a Ghanaian rapper, singer, and producer.

== Early life and education ==
King Paluta was born and raised in Atonsu, a suburb of Kumasi, in the Ashanti Region of Ghana. Growing up in Kumasi, a cultural hub for hiplife and Asakaa music, deeply influenced his artistic journey. He began showcasing his talent through rap battles in the streets of Kumasi, which helped him gain attention in the local music scene.

== Music career ==
King Paluta debuted in the Ghanaian music scene with a style that blends humor, social commentary, and intricate wordplay. He became a household name with hits such as Creativity, Songs of the Legends and Yahitte Remix, featuring artists like Kuami Eugene, Strongman and Amerado.

His versatility, demonstrated by seamlessly switching between languages like Twi and English, and his collaborations have solidified his presence in the hiplife and hip-hop genres. He is also regarded as a prominent figure in the Kumasi-based "Kumerica" music movement.

== Style and influence ==
King Paluta in 2026

King Paluta's music is characterized by an innovative mix of Ghanaian traditional rhythms and modern hip-hop beats. His storytelling ability and lyrical prowess have drawn comparisons to iconic Ghanaian rappers, positioning him as a significant voice in the country's evolving music industry.

== Discography ==
=== Selected singles ===
- "For The Popping"
- "Aseda"
- "Yahitte Remix"
- "Odo Bi Ye Bad" w/ Rap Fada
- "Makoma"
- Playman w/ Amerado
- Thank you
- Foko
- Ewor Me ft Kwabena Kwabena
- Give Up and See w/ Sarkodie

=== Album ===
- Give Time Some Time

== Awards and nominations ==
Awards And Nominations
Year	Body	Award Presented	Song	Results
2024	Telecel Ghana Music Awards	Best Hiplife Song of the Year Best New Artiste	Y'ahite Remix	Won
2024	Taabea Ghana Music Awards UK	New Artiste of the Year Hiplife Song of the Year	Y’ahitie Remix	Won
2024	Ghana Music Awards-Europe	New Artiste of the Year		Won
2024	Yen Awards	Best – Male Artiste of the Year		Won
2024	3 Music Awards	Best Hiplife Song of the Year	Y’ahitie Remix	Won
2025	Telecel Ghana Music Awards	Best Highlife Song of the Year Producer of the Year Most Popular Song of the Year	Aseda	Won

Although King Paluta remains private about his personal life, he often shares anecdotes from his upbringing in his songs. Themes such as resilience, gratitude, and ambition are frequently highlighted in his work.
