= Kwabena Kwabena =

Ghanaian musical artist (born 1978)

- Born: George Kwabena Adu (christened); 17 October 1978 (age 47); Bubuashie, Ghana
- Occupations: Musician, producer, draftsman, instrumentalist

George Kwabena Adu (born 17 October 1978) is a Ghanaian musician, guitarist, and an accomplished construction technician. His name, Kwabena Kwabena depicts the two vocations he is presently in, first as Kwabena, the draftsman, and Kwabena, the contemporary highlife musician. He emerged after featuring on Kontihene's 2004 hit, Esi and he featured Kontihene on his own debut hit, Aso.

== Early life ==
For basic school, Kwabena attended Datus Complex in Bubuashie, Green Hill School in Achimota, and Aggrey Junior Secondary School. He further proceeded to St. Peters Secondary School in Nkwatia for secondary education.

He started playing the guitar in church at the age of 14 and he also led the church choir. He then started hanging around Hush Hush studios featuring on various songs. He got introduced to Hammer of the Last 2.

== Career ==
His break through came in 2004 when he recorded his debut album ASO. Three of the songs were used in the soundtrack of Sparrow Productions's The Perfect Picture. Some of his hits include Ka kyere me, Trodom, Adea waye me, Fakye me, and Me ne woa. In 2007, he released his second album, Dabi. Kwabena Kwabena has a strong passion for philanthropic work and believes in his Ghanaian environment. This passion spurred him on to set up the KwabenaKwabena Save A Life Foundation. Kwabena went on to achieve a number of local and international awards some of which include, the best vocal performance and the best songwriter.

His third album, Daakye, came out in 2013 which also had hit songs like Bue Kwan, Adult Music, Bye Bye, etc.

During an interview in 2023, he indicated he had returned to school to pursue a bachelor's degree at the University of Professional Studies, Accra.

In October 2025, Kwabena Kwabena announced a remix of his classic song Asor, featuring Stonebwoy and Kofi Kinaata, to celebrate the 20th anniversary of his debut album.

== Personal life and controversies ==
=== Sexuality ===
Kwabena Kwabena's fashion statements came under criticism with many alleging he was gay. He has since refuted all claims about his sexuality mentioning on different occasions that his unique sense of style has nothing to do with his sexuality.

In 2021, he discouraged Ghanaians from abusing gays, lesbians and queer individuals because their human rights need to be respected. He also mentioned that God loved everyone hence the need to spread that love to everyone.

== Vitamilk Love Night With Kwabena Kwabena ==
Love Night with Kwabena Kwabena is an annual event that was introduced in 2014 and hosted at the Grand Arena which takes place every 14th February. The event showcases Kwabena's music and live performances celebrating love.

On the 10th of February, 2017, Vitamilk Love Night with Kwabena Kwabena took place at the National Theatre, other Ghanaian musicians like M.anifest, EL, Okyeame Kwame, Efya, Samini were present. The musician rewarded the best couple for that night. The 2024 edition took place at the Grand Arena, the event saw couples, lovers, friends, and music enthusiasts who came together with performances from Ghanaian vocalists like vocalists Kobby Wutah, Efya, and Becca.

Ghanaian radio/TV personality and events MC Kpekpo Maxwell Justice (KMJ) hosted the 2025 edition of Kwabena Kwabena's Vitamilk Love Night at the Grand Arena. The night saw performances from KiDi, Olivetheboy, Epixode, Pray3 among other young artistes like Verzes, Ceedi3gh which were coordinated by Image Bureau. On stage, Kwabena performed songs like Adult Music, Fakye, Afraid to Lose You, Siwagedem, Obaa, Aso, Royal Lady, and Meye.
