= Beeztrap KOTM =

Ghanaian rapper and songwriter

- Born: Edwin Eshun; October 17, 1999; Kumasi, Ashanti Region, Ghana
- Origin: Cape Coast, Central Region, Ghana
- Genres: Asakaa, Ghanaian drill, hip hop, Hiplife, Afrobeats
- Occupations: Rapper; Singer; Songwriter
- Years active: 2018–present
- Label: Independent

Edwin Eshun (born 17 October 1999), known professionally as Beeztrap KOTM, is a Ghanaian rapper, singer, and songwriter. He is a leading figure in the Asakaa drill scene and fuses drill with hiplife, hip hop, Afrobeats, and highlife. He won Best New Artiste at the 2025 Telecel Ghana Music Awards and Next Rated Act at the 2024 3Music Awards.

== Early life ==
Edwin Eshun was born on 17 October 1999 in Kumasi. He attended Kumasi Anglican Senior High School for his secondary education

== Career ==
Beeztrap KOTM began his music journey in 2018 with releases such as "Cinderella" and "Distance Relationship".

In 2023, he released an extended play Different Type of Gangster (2023), a seven-track project featuring O'Kenneth, Reggie, and City Boy. In 2024, he released the single "Fly Girl" featuring Oseikrom Sikanii, followed by a remix with Gyakie.

Beeztrap KOTM released his debut studio album, Power, in August 2025, a 16-track album which features Sarkodie, Gyakie, Himra, and other artists.

He has collaborated with other musicians including Sarkodie, Tulenkey, Skyface SDW, Camidoh, Stonebwoy. among others.

== Discography ==
=== Studio albums ===
- Power (2025)

=== EPs ===
- Different Type of Gangster (2023)

=== Selected singles ===
- "Distance Relationship" (2018)
- "Cinderella" (2022)
- "Yesu" (2024)
- "Bad Feeling" (featuring Tulenkey) (2024)
- "Obaa Hemaa" (with Skyface SDW) (2023)
- "Fly Girl" (featuring Oseikrom Sikanii) (2024)
- "Fly Girl (Remix)" (featuring Gyakie and Oseikrom Sikanii) (2024)
- "Amen" (with Sarkodie) (2024)
- "Adult Tempo 128" (2025)

== Awards and nominations ==
=== Telecel Ghana Music Awards ===
Year	Category	Work	Result	Ref.
2025	Best New Artiste	Himself	Won	
2025	Best Hiplife/Hip Hop Artiste	Himself	Nominated	
2025	Best Hip Hop Song	"Fly Girl"	Nominated	
2025	Best Hiplife Song	"Bad Feeling"	Won	
2025	African Song of the Year	"Fly Girl"	Nominated	
2025	Best Afrobeat Song	"Yesu"	Nominated	
2026	Best Collaboration of the Year	"Shoulder"	Won	

=== 3Music Awards ===
Year	Category	Result	Ref.
2024	Next Rated Act	Won	
