= Empress Gifty =

Ghanaian gospel musician

- Also known as: Gifty Empress Oppong Adorye
- Genre: Gospel
- Occupations: Musician, Entrepreneur, Songwriter.
- Years active: 2007-present

Empress Gifty (formerly Empress Gifty Osei) is a Ghanaian gospel musician and fashionista. She is the first Gospel Artist in Ghana to hit 1 Million Followers on Instagram.

== Early life and education ==
Empress was born to the Oppong and Annan family both from Central and Western Region of Ghana. She started her Primary School education at Mantey Din Primary School and Oninku Junior Secondary School all in Tema. She continued to a fashion school in Tema and after graduating, she opened her own fashion school in Tema where she trained students in fashion and lifestyle.

== Music career ==
Empress Gifty has collaborations with Opanka and Zaza Mohkheti from South Africa. She has hit songs like Aseda, Fefeefe, Epikye, Adensiedie, Adom, Jesus Over do, Jesus be too much, Odiyompo and Eye Woa.

She was awarded the artiste of the year in the 2018 National Gospel Music Awards. In 2019 she led the nomination list in the Maranatha Global Worship Music Awards held in Kenya.

She won VGMA Gospel Artist of the Year and Album of the Year in 2012, and won 4syte Gospel Music Video of the Year in 2021.

She hosts The Resurrection Effect Concert every year.

Gifty released a single "Watch me" which aim to give hope to the oppressed and those at point of giving up in life.

In 2025, She won GMAUS Artist of the year.

== Personal life ==
She is married to Ghanaian politician, Hopeson Adorye with two beautiful children.

== Discography ==
- Aseda - 2007
- Feefeefe - 2012
- Jesús be too much - 2014
- Ebenezar - 2017
- Jesus over do - 2020
- Odiyompo - 2021
- Eye woaa - 2021
- Awieyɛ pa(Expected End) - 2023
- Watch me - 2024

== Filmography ==
- 1957 (2024)

== Awards/nominations ==
Year	Organization	Category	Nominated work	Result	Ref
2012	VGMA	Gospel Artist of the Year	Herself	Won	
2012	VGMA	Gospel Album of the Year	Fefeefe	Won	
2015	Gospel Music Awards Italy	Best Female Gospel Musician of the Year	Herself	Won	
2017	Fashion and Lifestyle Awards	Most Stylish Artist of the Year	Herself	Won	
2021	Ghana Urban Gospel Music Awards	Music Video of the Year		Won	
2021	VGMA	Best Gospel Song of the Year	Jesus Over Do	Nominated	
2021	VGMA	Best Gospel Artiste of the Year	Herself	Nominated	
2021	3Music Awards	Digital Act of the Year	Herself	Won	
2021	3Music Awards	Gospel Act of the Year	Herself	Nom	
2021	3Music Awards	Gospel Song of the Year	Jesus Over Do	Nom	
2021	3Music Awards	Woman of the Year	Herself	Nom	
