= Lyrical Joe =

Ghanaian rapper

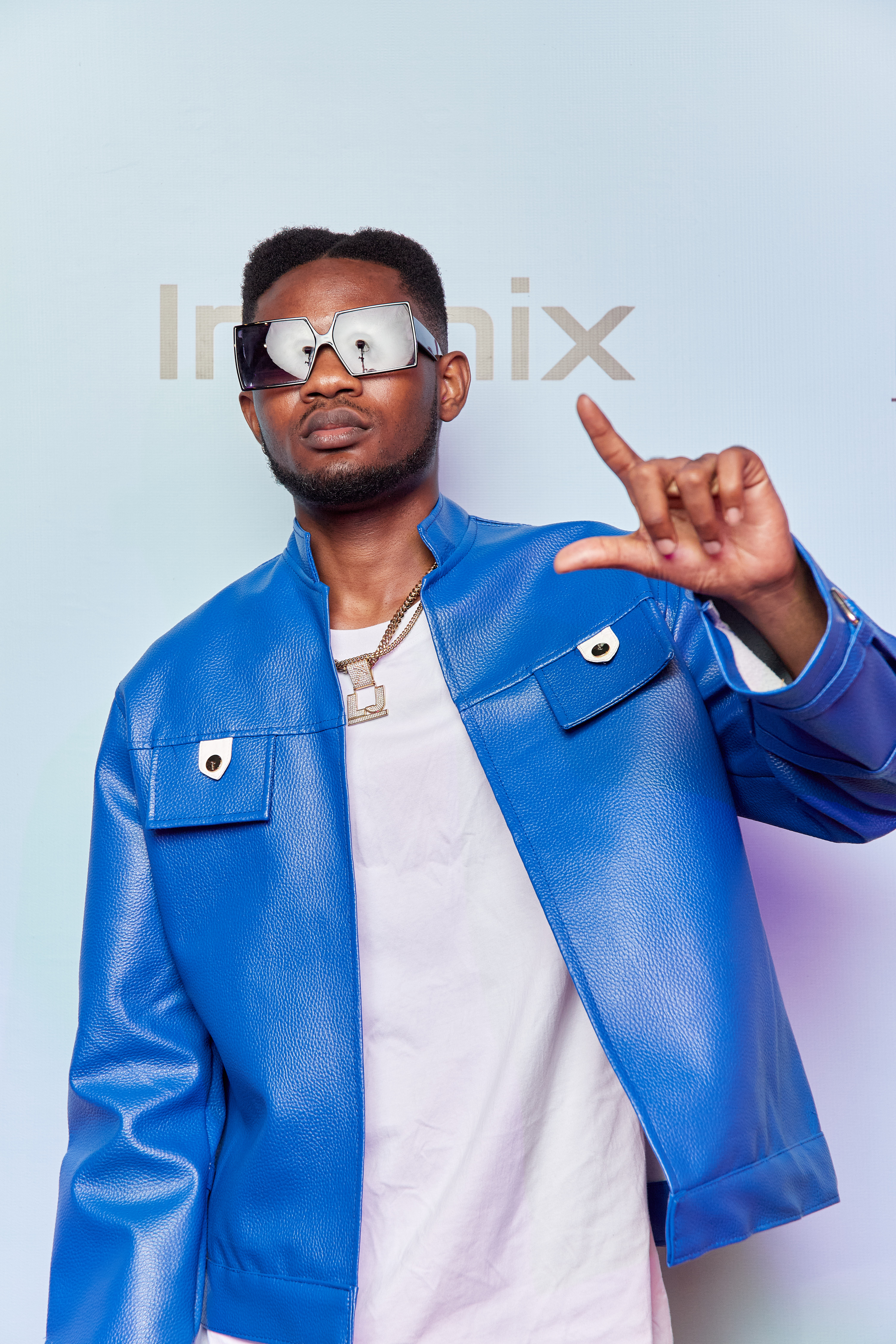

Background information
- Also known as: LJ
- Born: Joseph Gamor; 5 August 1995 (age 30)
- Origin: Ghana
- Genres: Hip-hop
- Occupation: Rapper
- Years active: 2018 - present

Joseph Gamor (born 5 August 1995) known professionally as Lyrical Joe (LJ) is a Ghanaian hip-hop rapper and songwriter born in Accra.

== Early life and music career ==
Lyrical Joe hails from Mafikumasi in the Volta region of Ghana but was born in the capital city of Ghana, Accra. He lost his parents at the age of 12. He had his Primary education at the Airport Police International School. Lyrical Joe participated in the African version of the X-factor show as the only rapper to represent Ghana. In 2022, a British lecturer from Edge Hill University in the United Kingdom dedicated a class lesson to studying the lyrics of songs from Lyrical Joe. He won the Best Rap Performance at the Ghana Music Awards in 2022. In 2023, he was on the Tim Westwood show.

== Albums and Eps ==
- KiLL Lp(2018)
- VIBES EP (2021)
- Photo Album (2023)

== Awards and nominations ==
Year	Organization	Category	Nominated work	Result	Ref
2025	Vodafone Ghana Music Award	Best Rap Performance	5th August 8	Nominated	
2025	Vodafone Ghana Music Award	Best Hiplife Song	Enter	Nominated	
2024	3 Music Awards	Rap Performance of the Year	5th AUGUST 8	Nominated	
2024	3 Music Awards	HipHop Song of the Year	5th AUGUST 8	Nominated	
2024	3 Music Awards	Hiplife/Hiphop Act of the Year	5th AUGUST 8	Nominated	
