= Obaapa Christy =

Ghanaian gospel musician

- Born: Kumasi, Ghana
- Genres: Gospel
- Occupation: Singer

Obaapa Christy (née Christiana Twene) formerly Christiana Love is a Ghanaian Gospel musician. The Meti Ase hit singer was recipient of Gospel Artist of the Year and Song of the Year Awards during the 2007 edition of Ghana Music Awards. In 2008, she was conferred with a National honor by John Kufuor.

== Early life ==
She was born on December 7 at New Suame (Kumasi )in the Ashanti Region of Ghana, to Mr Akwesi Twene and Mary Amoah Twene. She is the second born in a family of 9 siblings. She started singing at a very tender age. Obaapa Christy started music with “The Hallelujah Voices”, a vibrant music group in Kumasi until she was approached by Osuani Afrifa, a famous Gospel Musician. She released her first album in 2002 titled “Me Te Ase”.

== Career ==
She is a ghanaian gospel singer. Known as the queen of Ghana Gospel Music and the inventor of Contemporary Gospel music. Obaapa Christy has served as a role model to most Gospel musicians. Her style and ministration has been copied by lots of musicians who see her as an inspiration. Seventeen years down the lane, she has released eleven back to back inspirational albums with Wagye me as the latest. a song titled, The Glory in 2021.

== Awards and nominations ==
=== Vodafone Ghana Music Awards ===
Year	Nominee / work	Award	Result
2007	Herself	Best female vocal performance	Won
2007	Herself	Gospel Artist of the Year	Won
2007	'Ade Akye Abia' Kwaku Gyasi featuring Christiana Love	Best Collaboration of the Year	Won

== Discography ==
=== 2025 ===
- Odeneho ft Sarkodie

=== Albums and Notable Songs ===
- Me Te Ase (2002)
- Hyebre Sesafo (2015)
- Back to the Sender (2018)
- No Fears (2018)
- Holy Ghost (2018)
- Mekamafo (2018)
- New Era (Woa Na W’aye) (with Brother Sammy, 2018)
- Yesom Nyame Otease (2020)
- Old School Praise (2023)
- Odeneho (2025)

=== Selected singles and EPs ===
- "Hyebre Sesafo" (2005)
- "Me Te Ase" (2002)
- W’agye Me (EP, 2018) – includes "Ma Enye Yie"
- "The Glory (Eye Onoa)" (2021)
- "Wa Ye Wie" (feat. Kuami Eugene, 2020)
- "Mesuafre Awurade" (feat. Kwaku Gyasi)
- "Emma Me Nsre" (2022)
- "Are You Ready?" (2022)
- "Let It Go" (2023)
- "Bo Wo Nyame Din (Live)" (2023)
- "It Will Change (Ebesesa)" (2024)
- "Fakyɛ Me" (2024)

=== Notable songs ===
Other notable songs by Obaapa Christy include: "Aseda Nwom", "Onyame Ba", "Wiase Mu Abrabo", "Mawon Nsane", "Awurade Akae Me", "You Are God", "Downfall of a Man", and "Memma Me Werenfi".
