= Kelvyn Boy =

Ghanaian singer

Background information
- Also known as: Afrobeats Badman, Black Star
- Born: 1 April 1991 (age 35)
- Origin: Assin Fosu
- Genres: AfroBeats, Afro-Pop
- Occupation: Musician
- Instruments: Drums, acoustic
- Labels: Burniton Music Group, MiMLife Records, Blakk Arm Entertainment

Kelvyn Brown (born 1 April 1991), better known by his stage name Kelvyn Boy is a Ghanaian Afrobeat singer from Assin Fosu, Central region of Ghana. He got signed to Burniton Music Group owned by Stonebwoy and due to some controversies, left the label in the year 2019. He is known for popular songs like ''Mea'', Loko, Yawa No Dey, and Momo.

== Early life and career ==
Kelvyn Boy was born in Assin Fosu, to Solomon Yeboah and Adwoa Safoa. He lost his mother at early age. He was still able to complete Osei Tutu High School in Akropong, Kumasi.

== Discography ==
Single

- Toffee ft Medikal(2017)
- Na you ft Stonebwoy(2017)
- Mea(2019)
- Yawa no Dey feat M.anifest(2019)
- New Year(2020)
- Momo feat Darko Vibes, Mugeez
- Killa Killa(2020)
- Mata (2020)

Ep/Album

T.I.M.E Ep (2019)

Black Star (2020)

For the Kulture (2023)
