= Ceccy Twum =

Ghanaian gospel artist

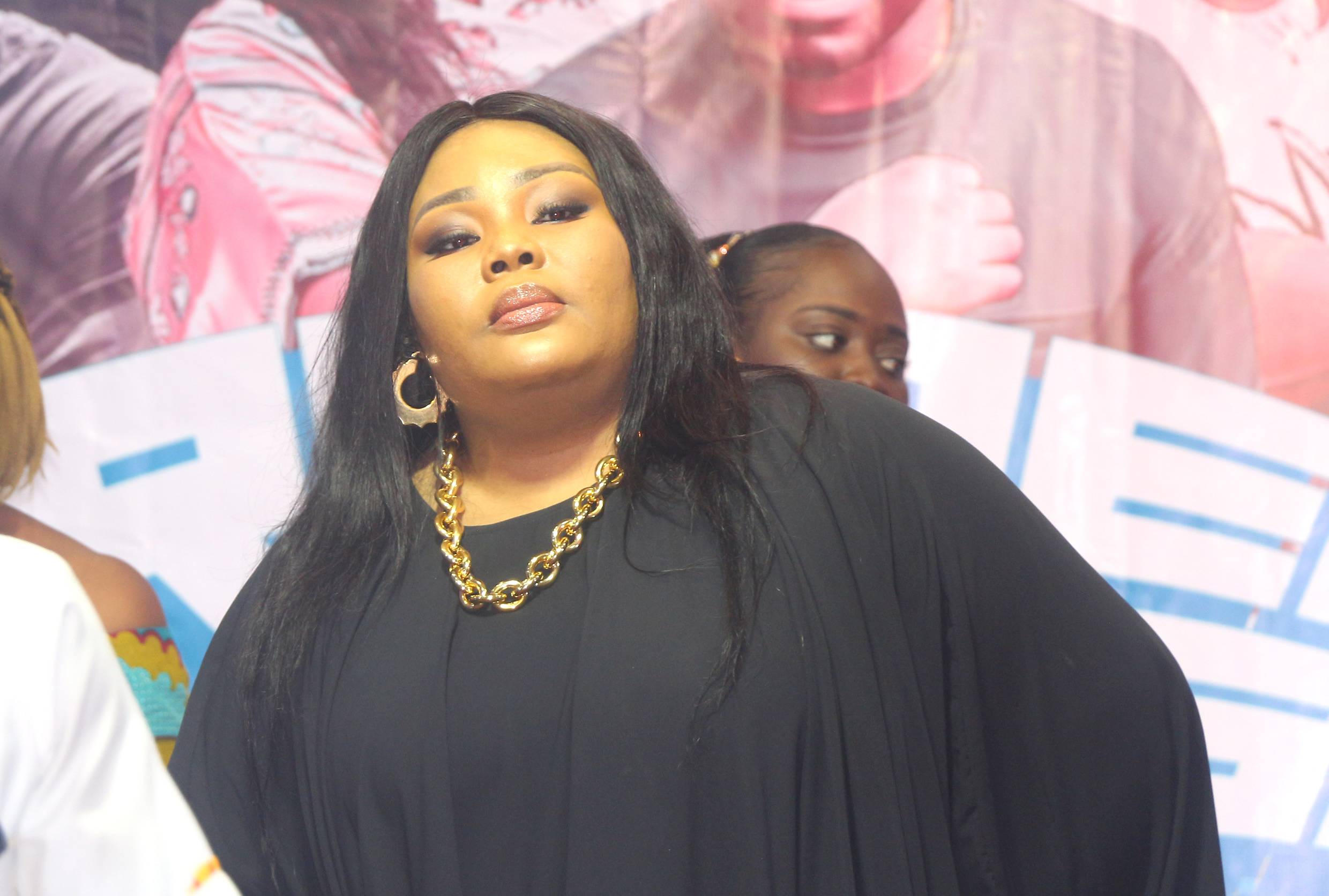

Background information
- Born: Ceccy Abena Ampratwum
- Genres: Gospel
- Occupations: Singer, songwriter
- Years active: 2005–present

Ceccy Abena Ampratwum (born 13 November), better known by her stage name Ceccy Twum, is a Ghanaian contemporary gospel singer and songwriter.

== Early life and education ==
Ceccy was born to the family of Mr and Mrs Andoh in Accra, Ghana. Ceccy Twum started her primary school education at the Don Bosco Catholic Primary and Junior high in Winneba and proceeded to Snapps College for her senior high education in Accra.

== Personal life ==
Ceccy is married to Prophet Alex Twum and they have three children. She is a gospel singer and worship leader.

== Music career ==
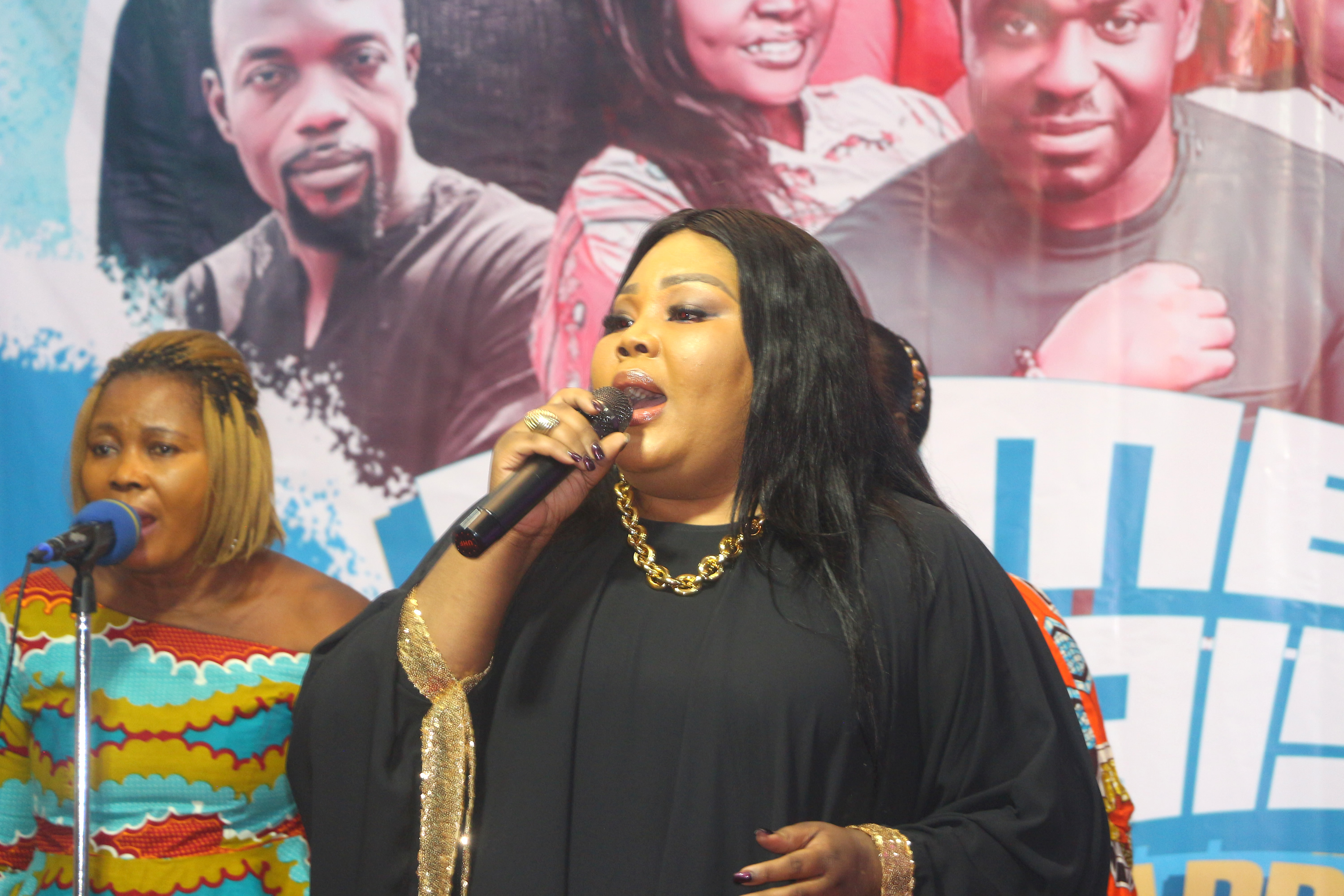
Ceccy Twum Ghanaian Gospel Musician 3

Ceccy Twum released her first album Me Gyefo ne Yesu in 2005, which brought her into the limelight. She has collaborated and performed on major platforms with several gospel musicians, including Mercy Chinwo, Joe Mettle, Ohemaa Mercy, MOG Music, Joyce Blessing, Nathaniel Bassey, Sinach, Frank Edwards, Empress Gifty. Ceccy has many hits songs including Victory, Di Wo Hene, Your Grace, Amen. In 2018 her major hit single Jehovah earned her a nomination at the Vodafone Ghana Music Awards as the Gospel song of the year. She was also nominated for Artiste Of Excellence West Africa at the African Music And Media Awards.

Ceccy hosts an annual Gospel event titled Gold Worship which gathers believers from all walks of life to worship together.

== Discography ==
=== Albums ===
- Me Gyefo ne Yesu (2005)
- Meko M'anim (2008)
- Golden Oil (2013)

== Awards and nominations ==
Year	Event	Award	Nominated work	Result	Ref
2018	African Gospel And Media Awards	Artiste Of Excellence West Africa	Herself	Nominated	
2018	Vodafone Ghana Music Awards	Gospel Song Of The Year	Herself	Nominated	
2020	3Music Awards	Gospel Act Of The Year	Herself	Nominated	
