= Piesie Esther =

Ghanaian gospel singer and songwriter (born 1981)

- Born: Esther Owusu; June 3, 1981 (age 44); Tamale, Northern Region, Ghana
- Origin: Nsuta-Atonsu, Ashanti Region, Ghana
- Genres: Gospel
- Occupations: Singer; Songwriter; Musician
- Instrument: Vocals
- Years active: 2002–present
- Label: Independent
- Spouse: Enock Asiedu
- Website: < www.piesieesther.com<

Esther Owusu, popularly known as Piesie Esther, is a Ghanaian gospel singer, songwriter, and musician.

== Early life and background ==
Esther Owusu was born on 3 June 1981 in Tamale, Northern Region of Ghana, to parents Grace Adu and Ransford Owusu. Although born in the north, she hails from Nsuta-Atonsu in the Ashanti Region and spent much of her youth there, completing her junior high education at Atonsu S.D.A JHS.

In her early years she took part in church singing and , at around age 16, moved to Kumasi where she worked and continued her singing ministry.

== Career ==
Piesie Esther released her debut album "Apae Ama Me" in 2002. She followed this with "Me Nte Ase" in 2008, which earned nominations at Ghana's national music awards the following year. Her third album, "Ziba Beko", appeared in 2011, and she released "Agye Won Nsem" in 2016. In 2017 she released a worship-album titled "Osoreɛ Mu Tumi". Among her notable singles is "Wayɛ Me Yie", which achieved significant airplay in Ghana.

== Awards and recognition ==
In 2023, Piesie Esther won the Gospel Artiste of the Year and Best Gospel Song awards at the 24th Vodafone Ghana Music Awards (VGMA).

In 2024, she was named Gospel Act of the Year at the 3Music Awards.

== Personal life ==
Piesie Esther is married to Enock Asiedu, who has served as her manager, and together they have four children.

== Discography ==
=== Selected ===
- Apae Ama Me (2002)
- Me Nte Ase (2008)
- Ziba Beko (2011)
- Agye Won Nsem (2016)
- Osoreɛ Mu Tumi (2017)
- Wayɛ Me Yie (single song)
