= Diana Hamilton (musician) =

Ghanaian gospel musician (born 1978)

Diana Antwi Hamilton
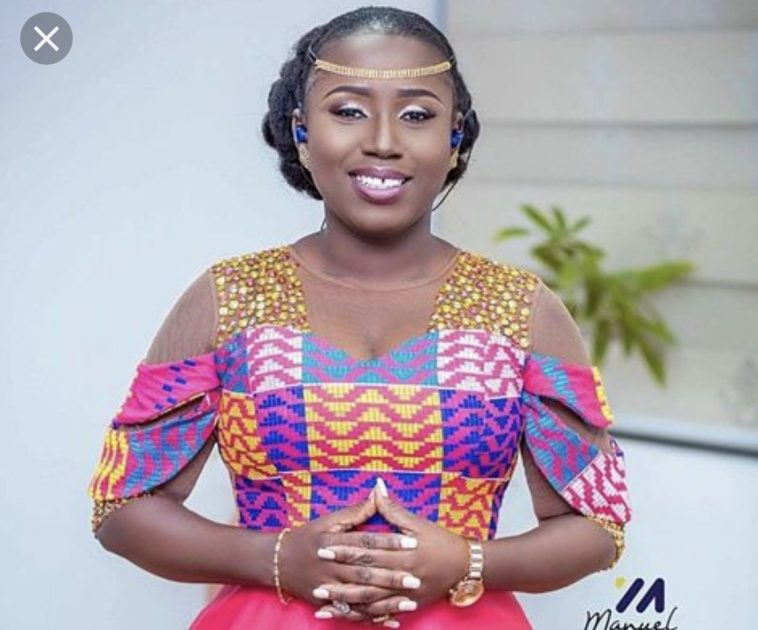

Background information
- Born: Diana Antwi
- Genres: Gospel, Urban contemporary gospel
- Occupations: Singer, songwriter, nurse fashion designer
- Instrument: Vocals

Diana Antwi Hamilton is a well-known Ghanaian gospel musician. She won the 2021 Most Streamed Female Act of the Year Award at the 3Music Women's Brunch. In March 2021, she was among the Top 30 Most Influential Women in Music by the 3Music Awards Women's Brunch. She was crowned Artist of the Year and Gospel Artist of the Year at the 2021 Ghana Music Awards on June 26 with her song "Adom". In 2024 she featured International Nigerian gospel artist Mercy Chinwo on her song titled the doing of the Lord

== Early life and education ==
Diana was born on 4 December 1978. She was born to Apostle Felix Antwi and Mrs. Comfort Antwi a former Executive Council Member of the Church of Pentecost. Among her eight siblings, she is the third of them. She had her basic education at Morning Star School, Cantonments in Accra. She continued her secondary education at the Ghana National College, Cape Coast and proceeded to study and practice nursing at Komfo Anokye Nursing College.

== Career ==
At an early age of 13, Diana was a backing vocalist for Francis Agyei. She released her debut album in 2007 titled, "Ɔsoro bɛkasa" and this album enjoyed some good airplay which brought her into the limelight. Her second album "Ensi wo yie", released in 2010, gained her prominence in the Ghanaian Gospel Music Industry. She was one of the headline artistes for the 2019 Harvest Praise which happened at the Fantasy Dome in Accra. 1615 media manages her music career. In May 2021, she was unveiled together with Kofi Kinaata as the Brand Ambassadors of Enterprise Life. She is also the brand ambassador for Awake Mineral Water and Property Electronics. She is an advocate for ‘healthy lifestyles”. She opened the second day of the 2021 VGMA music awards night with her performance.

== Personal life ==
She began her early life stages in Kumasi, Ghana, and is now married to Dr. Joseph Hamilton. The couple has twin children. Diana Hamilton enjoys cooking and designs her own fashion.

On Saturday, February 4, 2017, she launched the Diana Hamilton Foundation, a charitable organization to help provide for the needs of the underprivileged in society.

== Discography ==
=== Albums ===
Year	Title	Ref
2007	"Ɔsoro bɛkasa" (Heaven will speak)	
2010	"Ensi wo yie" (May it be well with you)	
2011	Blessings	
2015	Yehowah	

== Awards ==
Year	Organization	Awards	Nominated work	Result	Ref
2019	African Gospel Music and Media Awards	Artiste of Excellence Europe	Herself	Won	
2019	African Gospel Music and Media Awards	Female Artiste of Excellence Europe	Herself	Nominated	
2019	African Gospel Music and Media Awards	Video of Excellence	"Mo ne yo"	Nominated	
2019	African Gospel Music and Media Awards	Event of Excellence	Experience with Diana Hamilton	Nominated	
2019	African Gospel Music and Media Awards	Song of Excellence	"Mo ne yo"	Nominated	
2019	African Gospel Music and Media Awards	Album of Excellence	iBelieve	Nominated	
2020	Vodafone Ghana Music Awards	Gospel Artiste of the Year	Herself	Won	
2020	Vodafone Ghana Music Awards	Songwriter of the Year	Herself	Nominated	
2020	Vodafone Ghana Music Awards	Artiste of the Year	Herself	Nominated	
2020	Vodafone Ghana Music Awards	Most Popular Song of the Year	"W'asem"	Nominated	
2020	Vodafone Ghana Music Awards	Gospel Song of the Year	"W'asem"	Nominated	
2021	Vodafone Ghana Music Awards	Best Gospel Song of the Year	Adom	Won	
2021	Vodafone Ghana Music Awards	Songwriter of the Year	Adom	Nominated	
2021	Vodafone Ghana Music Awards	Best Music Video of the Year	Adom	Nominated	
2021	Vodafone Ghana Music Awards	Best Gospel Artiste of the Year	Herself	Won	
2021	Vodafone Ghana Music Awards	Vodafone Most Popular Song of the Year	Herself	Won	
2021	Vodafone Ghana Music Awards	Artiste of the Year	Herself	Won	
2022	3Music Awards	Gospel Act of the Year	Herself	Nominated	
2024 2024	Telecel Ghana Music Awards Telecel Ghana Music Awards	Best Gospel Song Of The Year Gospel Song Song	Say Amen Adom	Nominated	
