= Lasmid =

Ghanaian musician

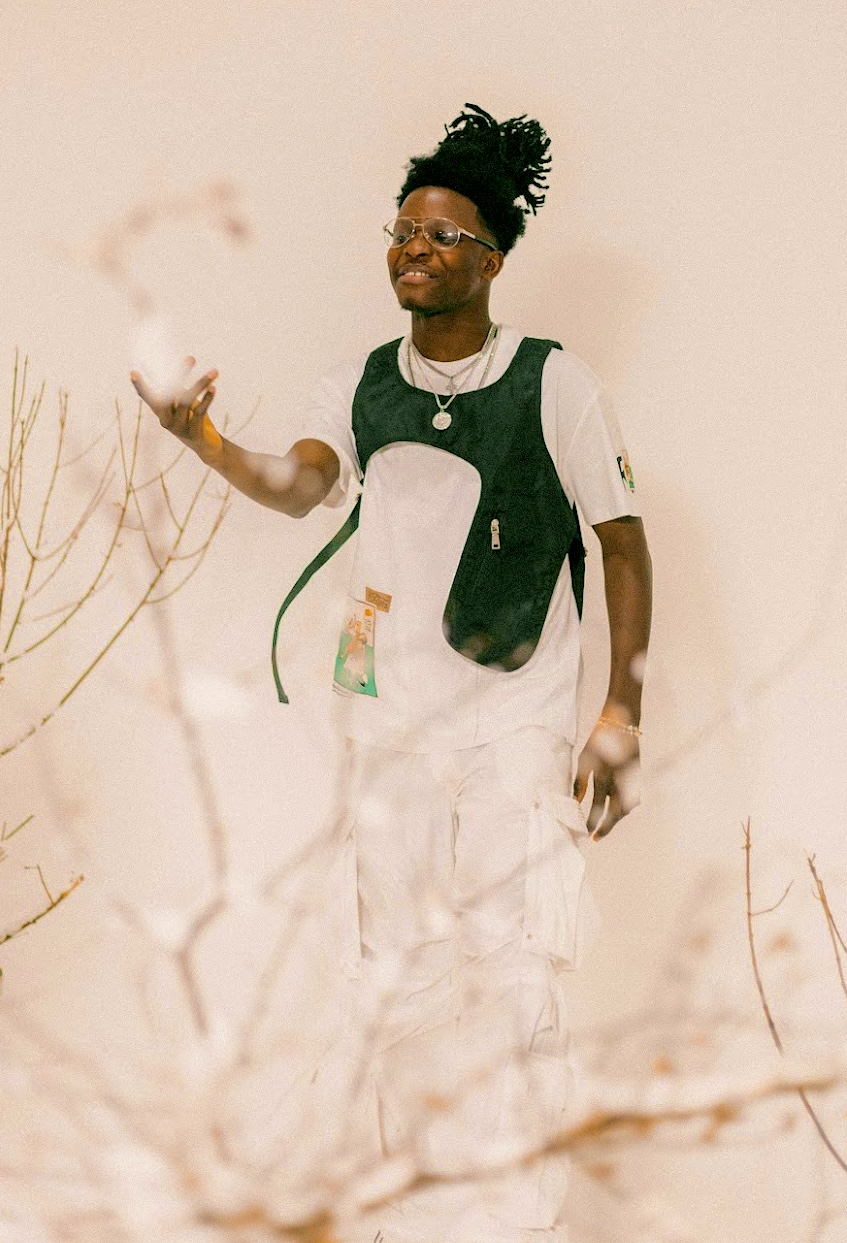

Background information
- Also known as: Charger
- Born: Ladsmid Nathaniel Owusu; May 24, 1999 (age 27); Takoradi, Ghana
- Genres: Afrobeats, Highlife, Rapper
- Occupations: Musician, singer, songwriter
- Years active: 2019–present
- Label: Highly Spiritual Music

Ladsmid Nathaniel Owusu (born 24 May 1999), known professionally as Lasmid (formerly Charger), is a Ghanaian musician, rapper and songwriter from Takoradi in the Western Region of the Republic of Ghana. He was crowned winner of the MTN Hitmaker Season 8. He is best known for his 2022 single "Friday Night", which went viral on TikTok and subsequently topped several music charts in Ghana.

== Education ==
Lasmid had his primary education in a village near Dunkwa, in the Western Region of Ghana, and later attended Takoradi Technical Institute (TTI) for his secondary education. After completing senior high school, he took part in MTN Hitmaker.

== Career ==
In 2019, Lasmid won the eighth season of MTN Hitmaker, for which he received a GH₵120,000 recording contract. Following the contest, Ghanaian music producer Kaywa signed him to his record label, Highly Spiritual Music. In 2022, Nigerian singer Naira Marley expressed interest in signing Lasmid to his label.

As of 2022, he had collaborated with Sarkodie, Medikal, Kofi Kinaata, Dead Peepol, Mr Drew, Kuami Eugene and Amerado.

He gained fame following the release of a remix of his single "Sika", which featured Kuami Eugene.

Pulse Ghana recognized Lasmid as the heir to Kofi Kinaata's musical legacy, referencing his singing and rapping. He has garnered a significant fan base, especially in Takoradi, Ghana.

== Controversies ==
During the 2023 Vodafone Ghana Music Awards, Lasmid delivered a performance that sparked considerable discussion afterward. He was criticized for not performing well. In August 2023, during an interview with Andy Dosty, Lasmid acknowledged that the performance had not met his own expectations.

== Awards and nominations ==
Year	Ceremony	Award	Nominated work	Result	Ref
2025	Telecel Ghana Music Awards	Best Afrobeat Song Telecel Most Popular Song	"Pull"	Nominated	
2024	Ghana Music Awards	International Collaboration of the year	"Butter My Bread"	Nominated	
2023	Vodafone Ghana Music Award	Best New Artist	Himself	Won	
2023	Vodafone Ghana Music Award	Best Hiplife Song	"Friday Night"	Won	
2023	Vodafone Ghana Music Award	Best Collaboration	"Grace"	Nominated	
2023	Vodafone Ghana Music Award	Most Popular Song of the Year	"Friday Night"	Nominated	

== Discography ==
- "Odo Lastic" ft Kofi Kinaata
- "Atele"
- "Sika" ft Dead Peepol
- "Father" ft Mr Drew
- "Sika" Remix ft Kuami Eugene
- "Friday Night"
- Amerado – "Grace" (as a featured artiste)
- YPee - "Ewuraba" (as a featured artiste)
- "Running"
- JZyNO - "Butta My Bread" (as a featured artiste)
- "Bad Boy"
- "Puul"
- "Zanzibar (Alubarika)"
- Olivia (2025)
- No Issues (2025)
- TSOOBI (AKONOBA) (2025)
