= Andy Dosty =

Ghanaian disc jockey and radio host

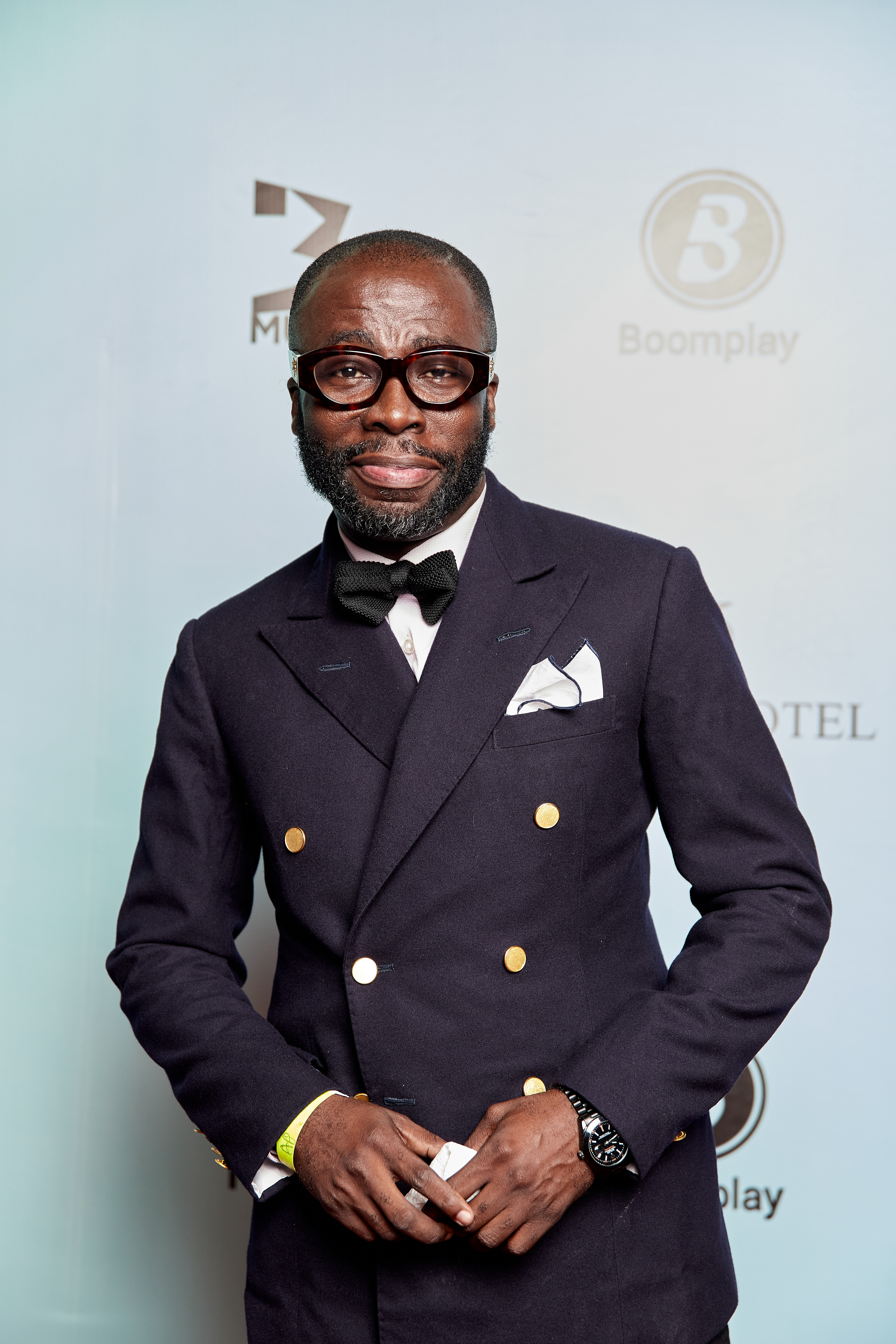
- Other name: Andrew Amoh
- Occupations: Radio personality, TV Presenter, Master of ceremonies, Musician

Andy Dosty, born Andrew Amoh, is a Ghanaian disc jockey and radio presenter with Multimedia Group Limited. In 2017, he took over as the host of Daybeak Hitz on Hitz FM. He is a recipient of the 2019 National Communications Awards Radio Personality of the Year.

== Career ==
In addition to being a presenter and DJ, Dosty has hosted a variety of programs in Ghana and beyond, including the launch of The Taste of Afrika program.

In 2018, Dosty was appointed to the board of the Ghana DJ awards. In 2019 he was named an ambassador of the International Youth Empowerment Foundation's annual youth summit.

In 2019 Dosty released a single, featuring Kuami Eugene, titled "Love You Die". Later that year, he sparked controversy when he sought public opinion on a statement made by Ghanaian dance hall musician, Shatta Wale, on social media. Dosty later took the credit for helping make Wale a successful artist in Ghana. Fans of Wale claimed Dosty had twisted the facts.

In 2021, Dosty had removed performer Okese 1 for reporting late at his studio and behaving rudely.

He co-hosted the Guinness Ghana DJ Awards 2024 with TV personality Roselyn Felli.

== Personal life ==
Andrew Amoh popularly known as Andy Dosty in the Ghanaian Entertainment industry was born in Ankasi in the Asante Region of Ghana to Mr. Kwame Amoh and Madam Elizabeth Owusu Achea who was a headmistress of Akrom MA JHS. He had his basic education in Kumasi and continued his secondary school at Prempeh College also in Kumasi where he received his O Level certificate in 1993/994 .

He pursued his education and radio training at the Ghana Broadcasting Corporation radio school where he acquired the requisite media skill needed to shape his radio presentation skill.

=== The daughter ===
Radio personality Andy Dosty recently shared a story about a former girlfriend who may have had his daughter without his knowledge. Although the mother never confirmed it, the child strongly resembled him when he finally saw her at 13 or 15 years old, even more so than his biological siblings. Some believe he initially denied responsibility for the pregnancy, leading someone else to raise the child. The possibility of a DNA test has been suggested to resolve the situation definitively. Despite his ex-girlfriend's denial of paternity, he supported the child due to their strong resemblance. Andy provided for her education and needs but never pursued a DNA test because of their striking likeness. The child, now an adult, is believed to have married and lives in Durban. Surprisingly, Andy was never informed about her marriage. He reviewed that and recently learned that she has become a mother.
