= OliveTheBoy =

Ghanaian musician (born 2002)

- Born: Joel Ofori Bonsu; 19 October 2002 (age 23); Konongo, Ghana
- Origin: Konongo, Ghana
- Genres: Afro pop; Afrobeats
- Occupations: Musician; singer
- Years active: 2020 & present
- Labels: Columbia Records, Bu Vision

Joel Ofori Bonsu (born October 19, 2002) known by the stage name OliveTheBoy is a Ghanaian Afrobeats singer and songwriter. He is currently signed to Sony Music's Columbia Records through its subsidiary Bu Vision Entertainment.

== Early life and career ==
OliveTheBoy had his senior high school education at the Opoku Ware Senior High School in Kumasi, Ashanti Region of Ghana. He is currently enrolled at the University of Ghana for his tertiary education.

He started making music in 2020 just after completing his high school education. He released his debut EP in May 2023 titled Avana EP which had the single Godsin which became the most streamed Ghanaian song in first half of 2023.

He is signed to Columbia Records through its subsidiary Bu Vision Entertainment foundered by Bu Thiam Columbia Record's vice president and is managed by Loop Music/FulLCircL Management Ltd.

In June 2023 he was named Apple Music's Up Next Star due to his rising popularity, and first in the Chartmetrics list of most streamed Ghanaian performers from January to June.

== Discography ==
=== Singles ===
- Goodsin (2023)
- Je (2023)

=== EPs ===
- Avana EP (2023)
