= Porials Pitch =

Annual retail event held in Accra, Ghana

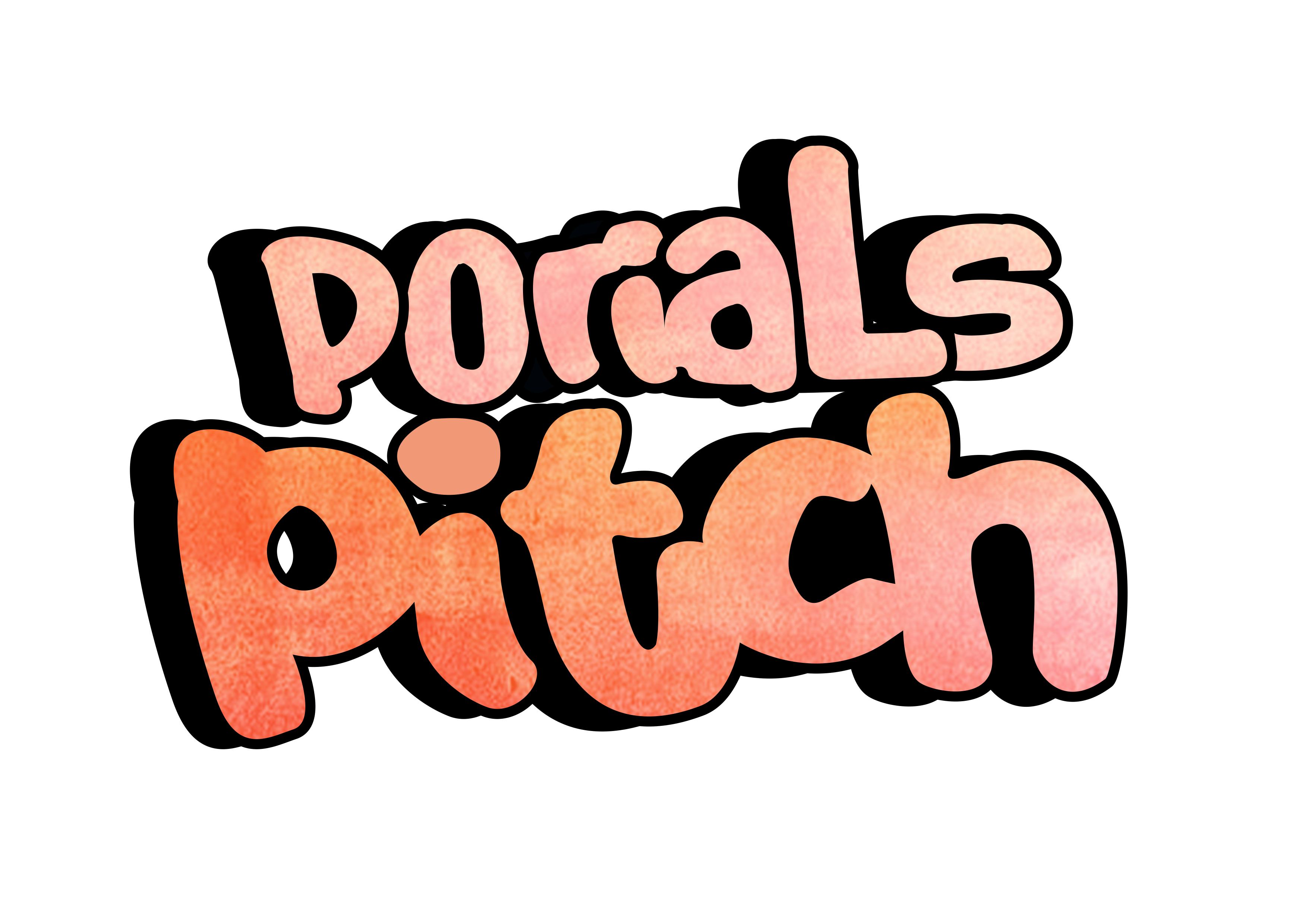
- Genre: Retail, trade fair
- Locations: Accra, Ghana
- Years active: 2024–present
- Founders: Dulcie Boateng
- Website: porialspitch.com

Porials Pitch is an annual shopping exhibition in Accra, Ghana. Founded in 2024 by Ghanaian entrepreneur Dulcie Boateng. The event features both local and regional brands.

== History ==
The first Porials Pitch event took place on 20 April 2024 at Accra Mall’s Ghud Park. It featured vendors from Ghana and Nigeria, with products ranging from fashion and beauty items to technology and home appliances.

The second edition of the event was hosted on 29 April 2025 with an estimated 60,000 attendees. These included sponsors Absa Bank Ghana (main sponsor), TECNO Mobile, Hollard Insurance, JAC Motors, Bolt, Woodin, and Silverbird Cinemas. Some of the prizes included shopping vouchers, electronic devices, and a car.

Nana Mitch and Schardo Mitch hsa been the creative directors for the event, with Elite PR handling the media aspect. The 2025 edition also included performances by Ghanaian artists such as KiDi, Mr Drew, Olivetheboy, and Cina Soul.

=== Gallery ===
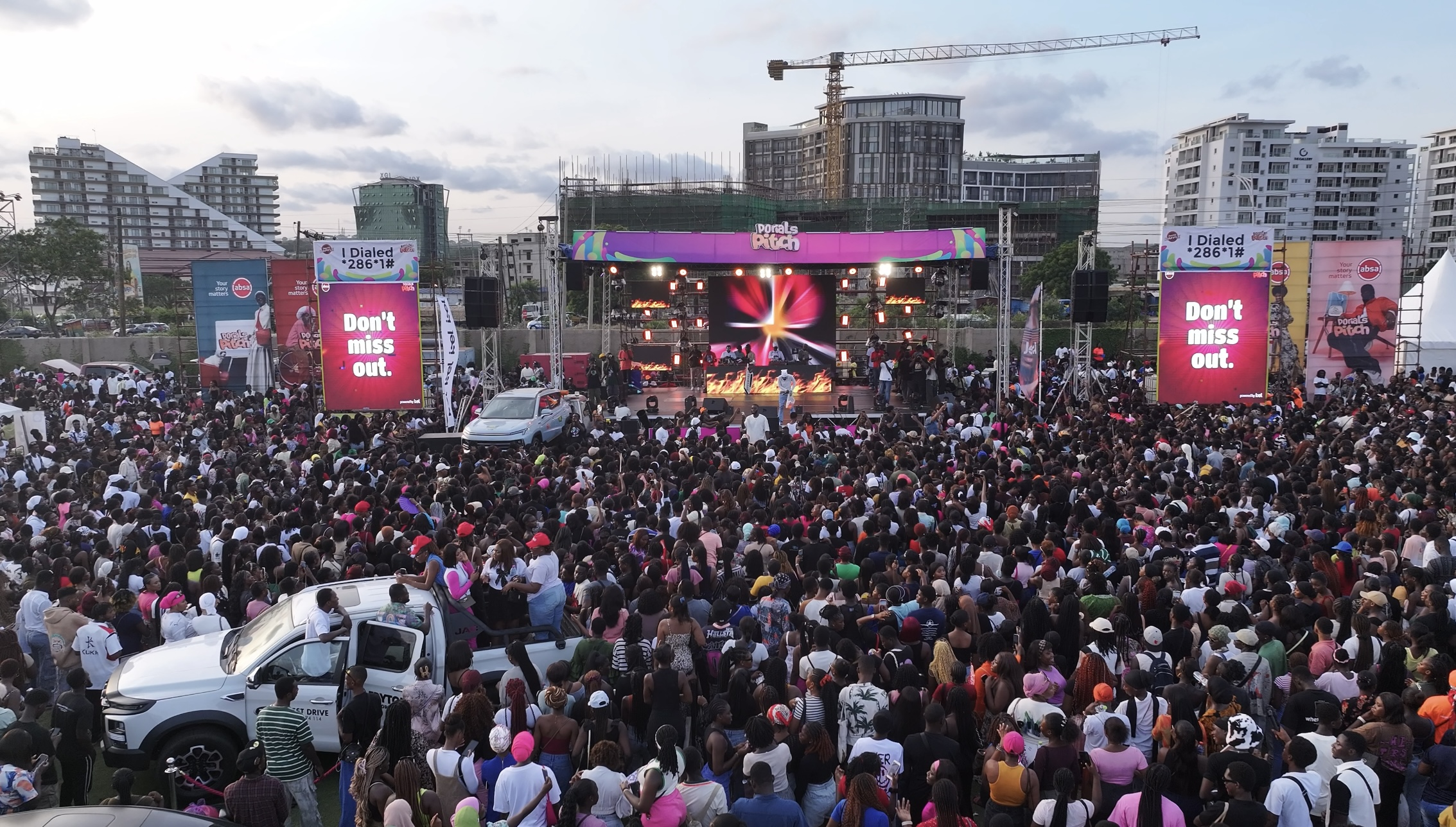
Crowd at the second edition of Porials Pitch (2025)

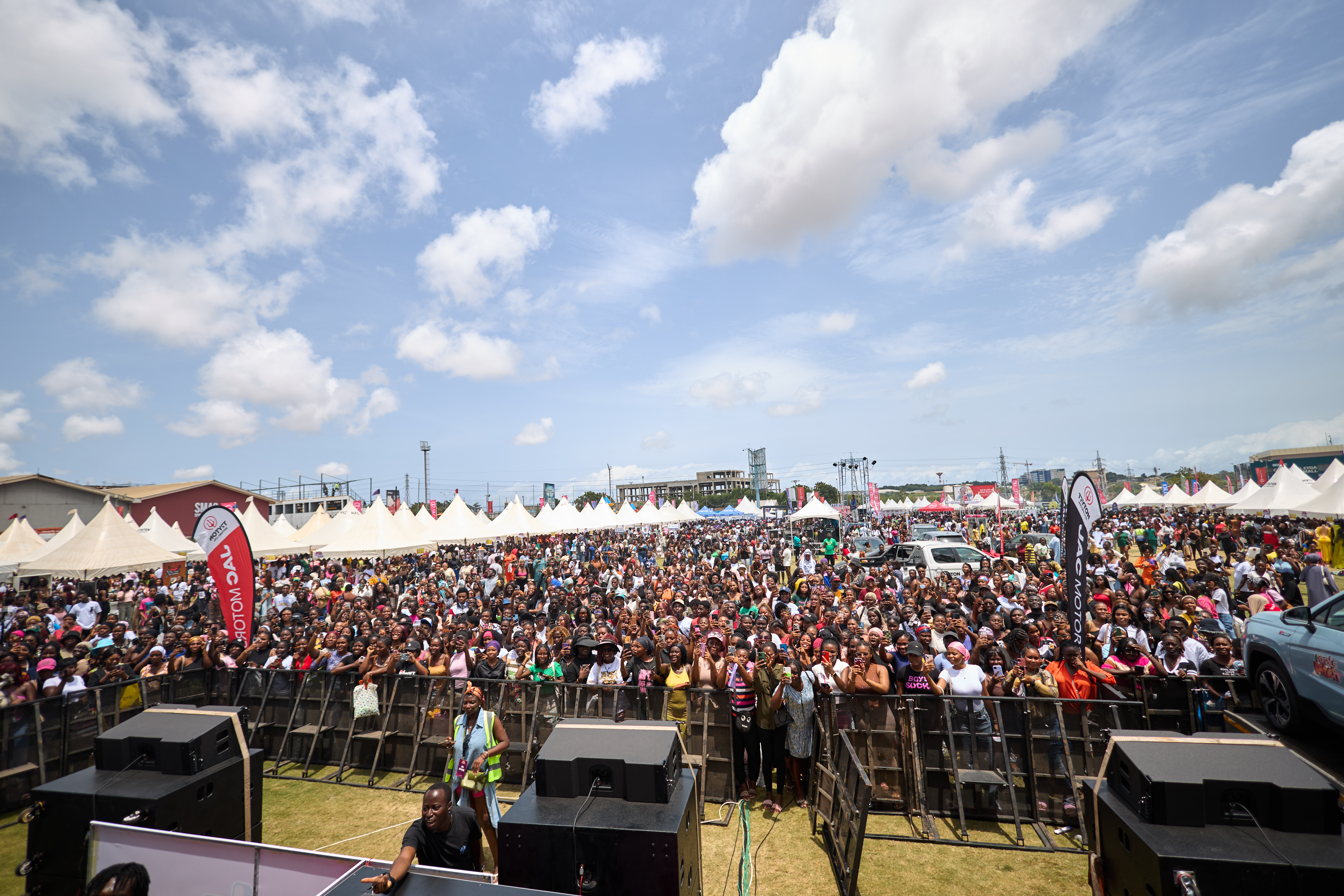
Vendors and attendees at Porials Pitch II

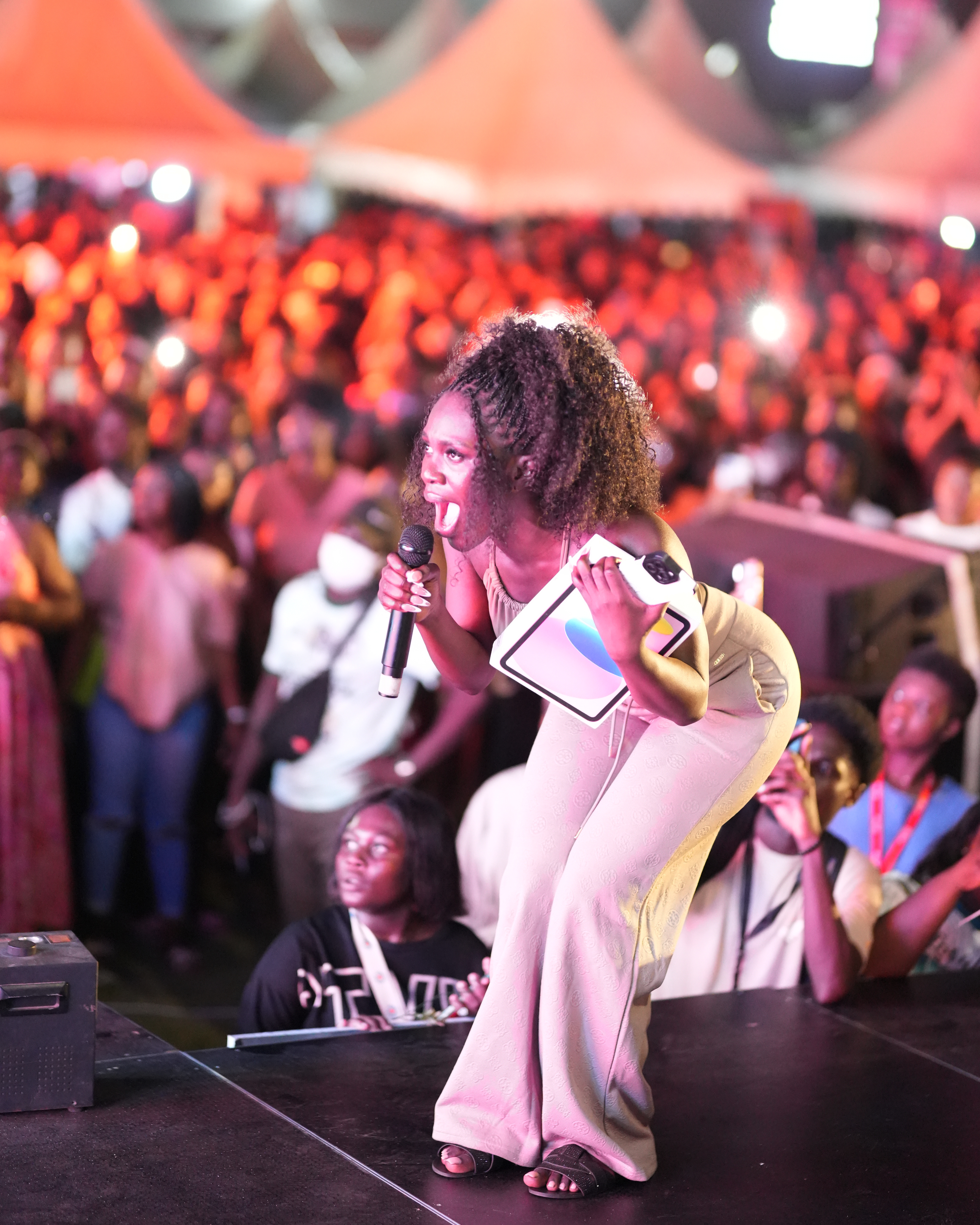
Exhibition area at Porials Pitch II

== Organisation ==
Porials Pitch is organised by Dulcie Boateng, who is also the founder and CEO of Dulcie Porium, a Ghanaian retail brand. The event combines commercial exhibitions with live entertainment and promotional activies. It is one of the country's most influential retail gatherings.

== See also ==
- Ghana Trade Fair Center
- Accra Mall
