= Architecture of Ghana =

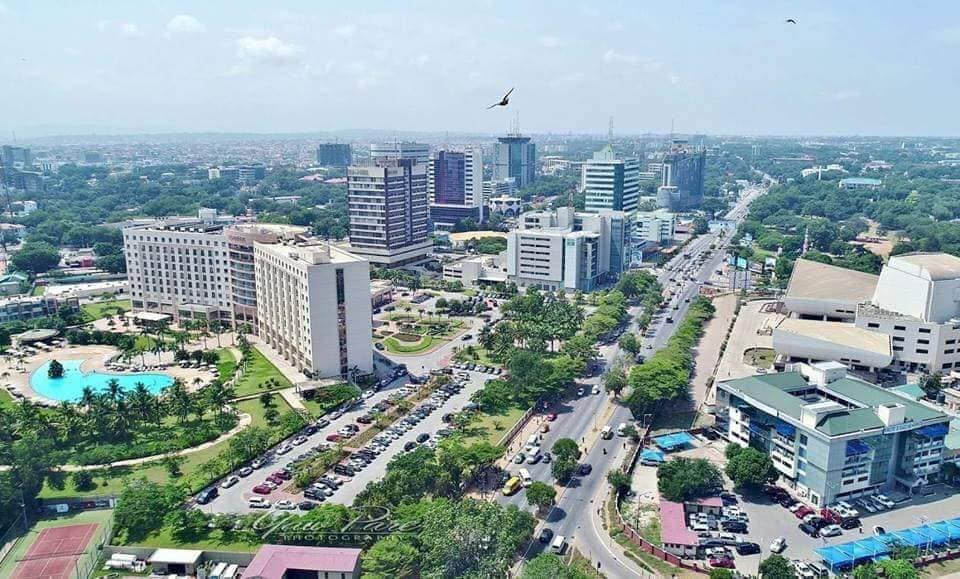
High-rise buildings in contemporary Accra, the capital

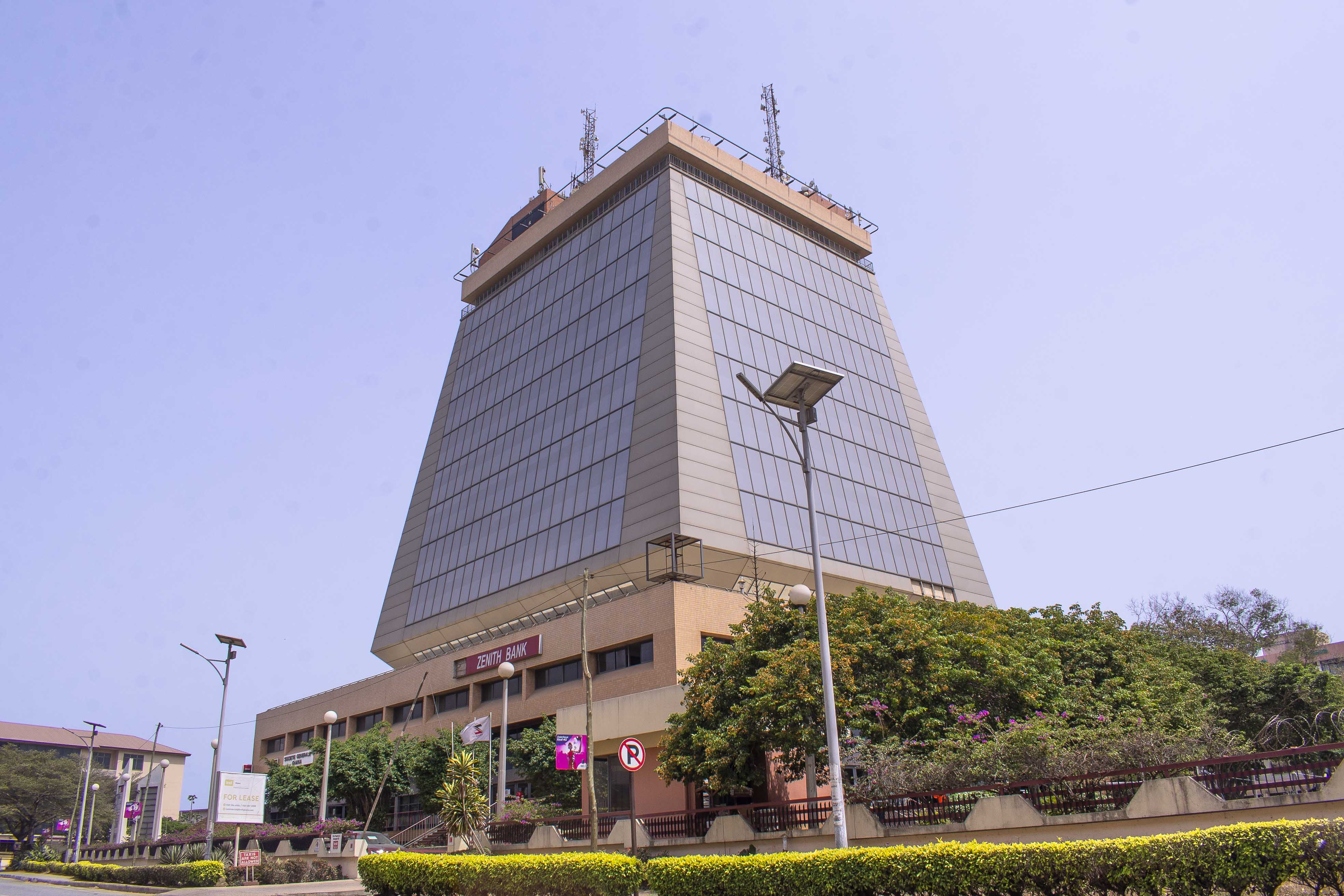
Pyramid House

The architecture of Ghana is influenced by a variety of historical, cultural, and environmental factors. Its architectural heritage consists of traditional architectural styles, monumental and symbolic architecture, and historic buildings and neighbourhoods. Architecture found across the country can be classified into indigenous architecture of the various ethnic groups, architecture of the colonial era, the tropical modernist style of the independence era, and architecture in contemporary times.

Traditional Ghanaian architecture is marked by the use of local materials such as mud, wood, grass and thatch, and is characterised by its adaptability to the local climate and environment. Indigenous structures, such as the Asante and Mole-Dagbani buildings were constructed using techniques like wattle and daub, with decorative bas-relief patterns, and features cultural symbols such as Adinkra motifs. With the arrival of the Europeans in the 15th century, architectural styles such as Gothic Revival were introduced, influencing the design of churches, and Neoclassical elements became prominent in government buildings and residential structures. This fusion of European influences with traditional indigenous construction methods brought about a change in the country's architectural landscape.

From the late 1950s, the architectural scene of Ghana saw the rise of Tropical Modernism, which combined modernist principles with the need for buildings adapted to the country's tropical climate. Characteristics of this style include the emphasis on natural ventilation, shading, and the use of locally sourced materials, with a focus on sustainability and functionality.

In contemporary Ghana, architecture has evolved to incorporate a blend of traditional and modern elements. Locally available materials, energy-efficient designs, and construction methods adapted to the tropical climate influence building practices.

== Indigenous architecture ==
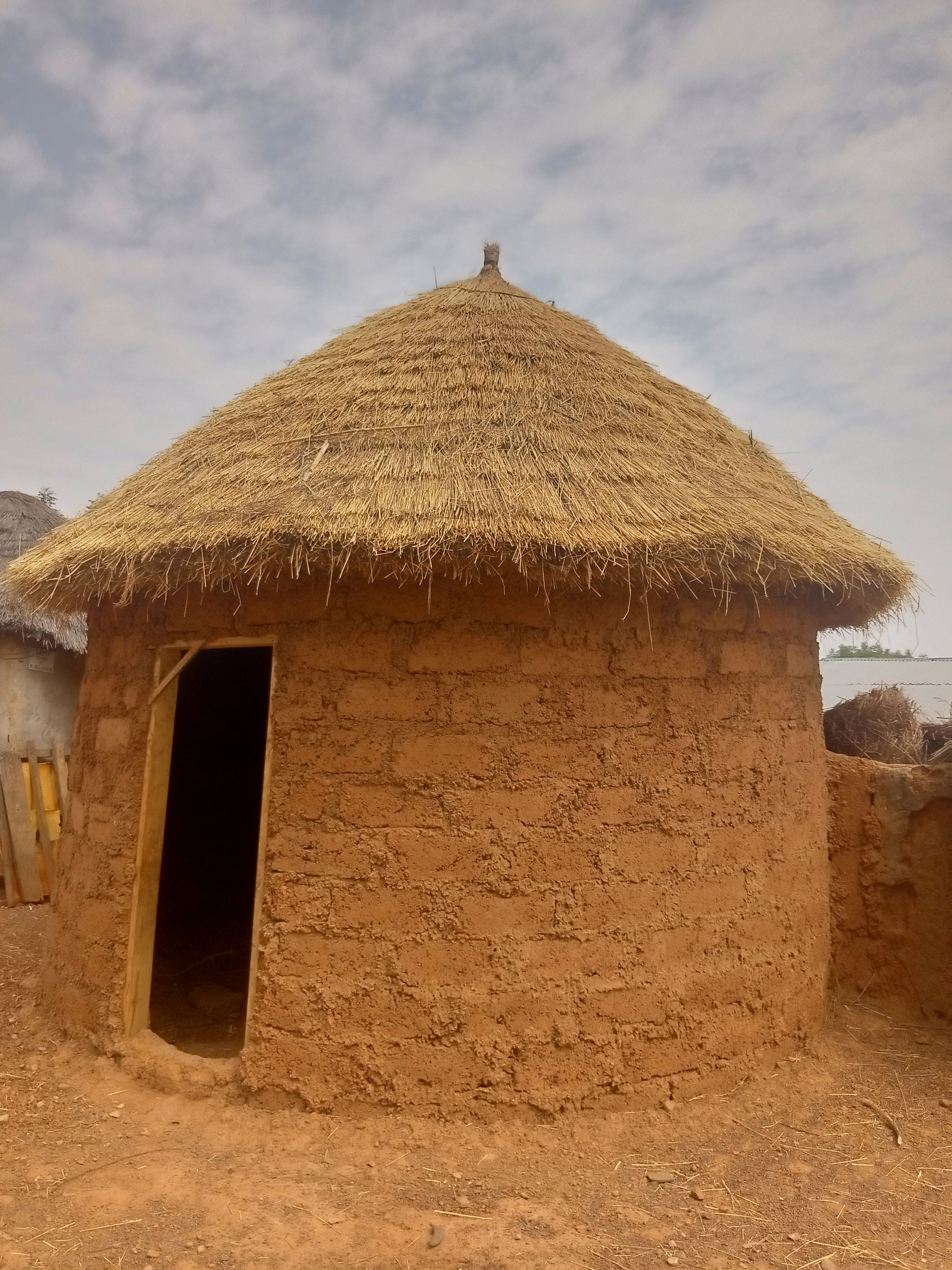
A room made of mud and roofed with dry grass.

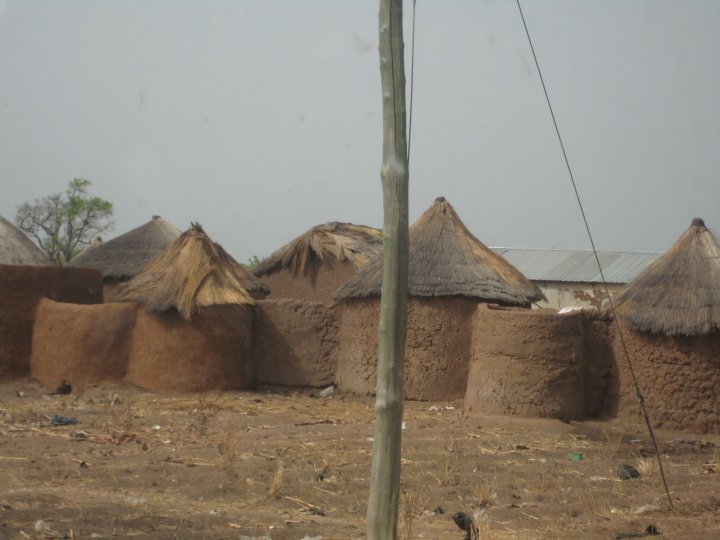
Locally designed buildings

A village house in the Western Region of Ghana

Traditional buildings in the northern, middle and southern zones vary in materials and techniques used for their construction. Common vernacular building materials that have been used over centuries include timber, bamboo, laterite, grass, thatch, and clay. In Pre-colonial Ghana, traditional buildings were primarily made from materials such as mud, wood and thatch, chosen for their availability, affordability, and climate adaptability. These materials were used to build durable structures, particularly in rural areas. The wattle and daub construction method was widely used by groups like the Ashanti Empire and dates back to about 6000 years ago. This technique involved weaving wooden frames and filling them with a mixture of mud and straw, which created a sturdy wall structure.

In the Southern coastal regions, timber-frame construction with palm-thatched roofs is prevalent, while in Nzema, pile dwellings are built over water. The savanna regions of the north are characterised by dispersed homesteads and adobe compounds that blend with the landscape. Historical influences, including European and Muslim penetration introduced elements like louvered jalousies and sun-dried bricks, which were assimilated into Ghana's traditional architecture over time.

Murals

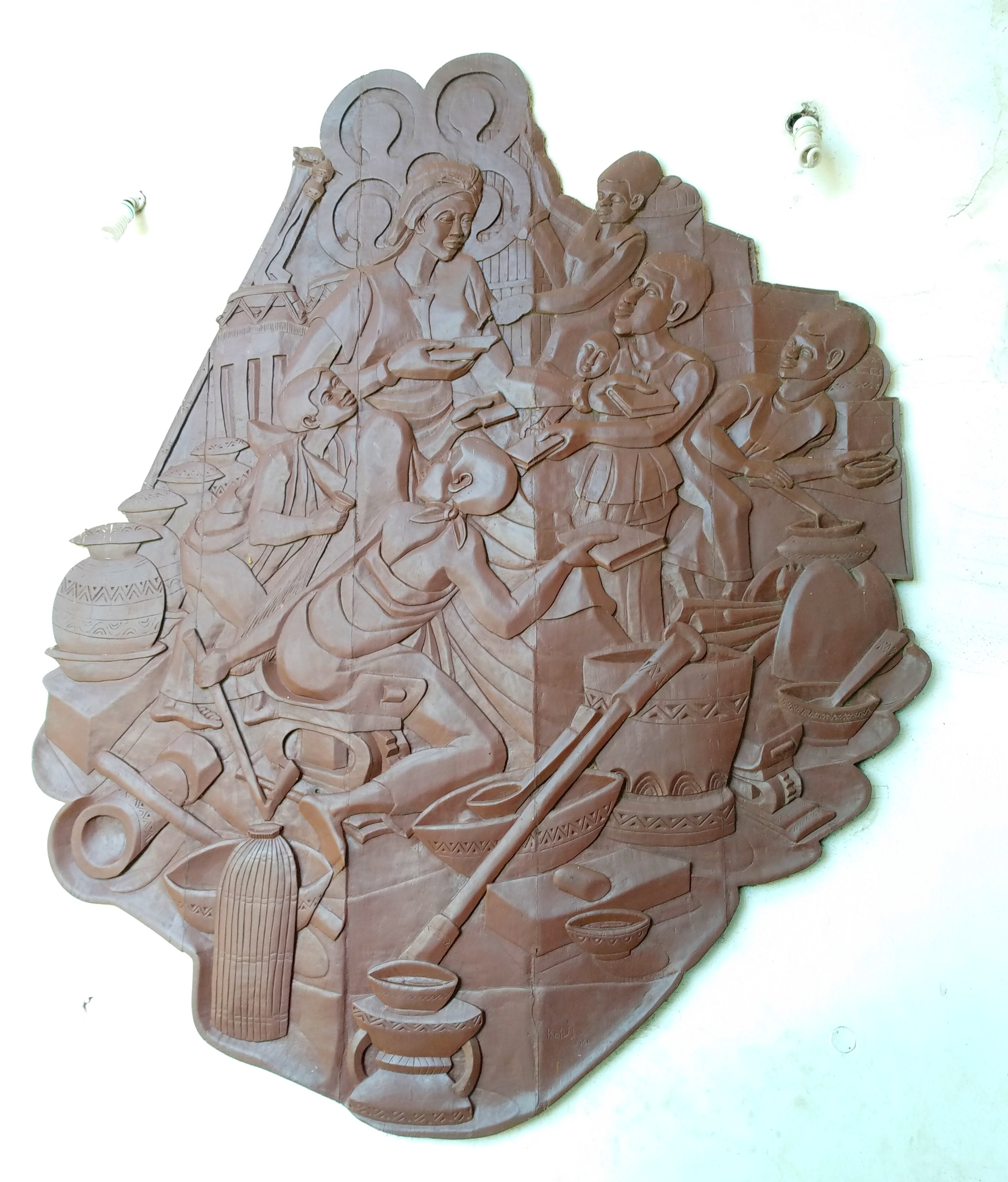
An example of a wall mural, Ghana Library Authority Building

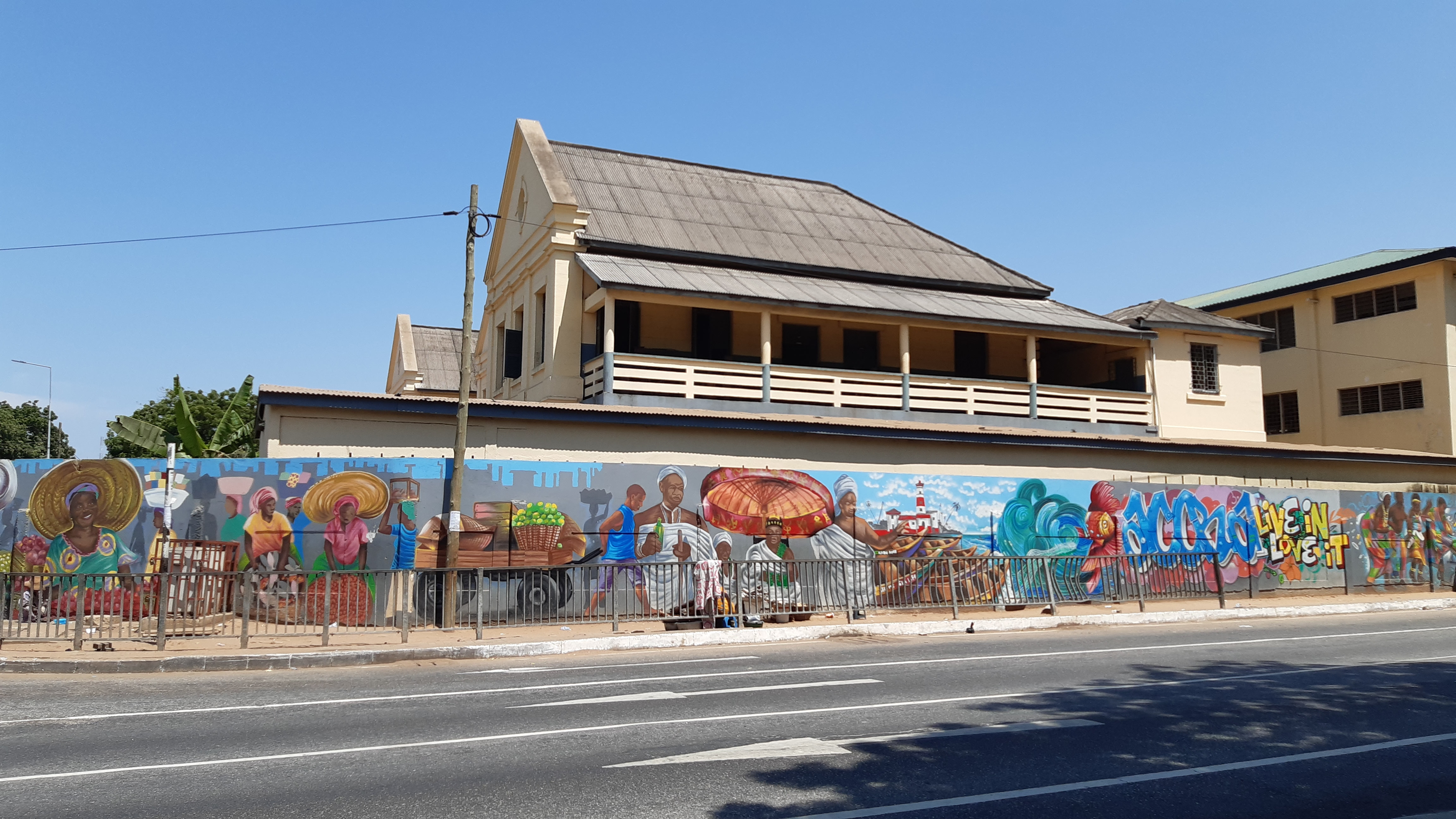
Depiction of mural decorations on the wall of Kingbu School.

Mural decoration is another important feature of Ghanaian indigenous architecture. In the northern regions like Kassena, it appears on nearly all buildings, both private and state-owned. In the southern regions, murals are primarily on chiefs' palaces and fetish houses. These decorations were not only for self-expression, but also served as a means of identifying and distinguishing individual structures.

A major characteristic of Ghana's indigenous style is its reliance on locally sourced materials, environmental adaptability, integration with nature, and cultural significance of building practices. Construction techniques and methods such as the timber framed, adobe construction, pile dwellings and rammed earth have been used for centuries, particularly in rural and semi-urban areas.

=== Ashanti Empire architecture ===
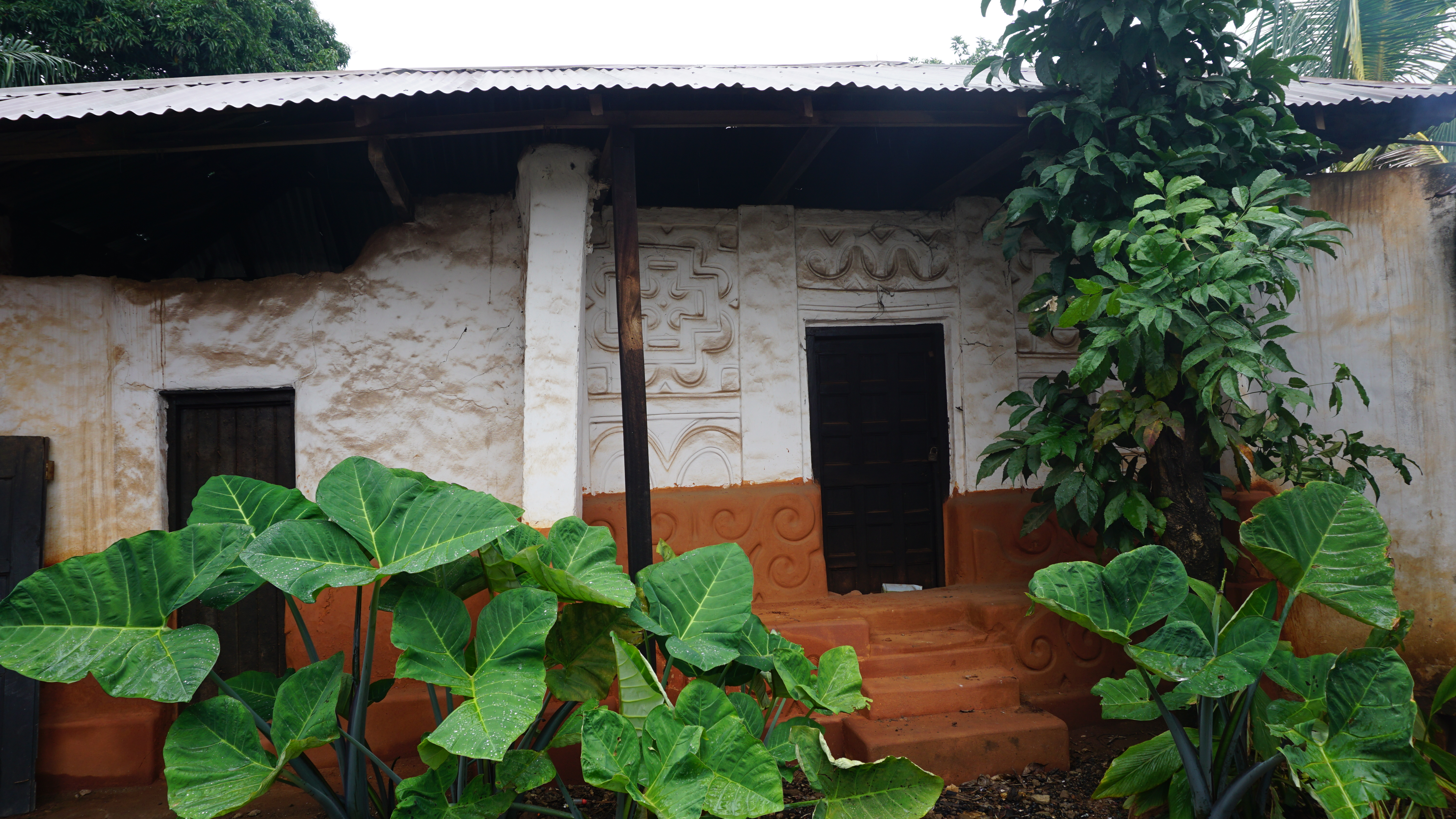
Front view of Kentikrono shrine, one of the traditional buildings of the Asante

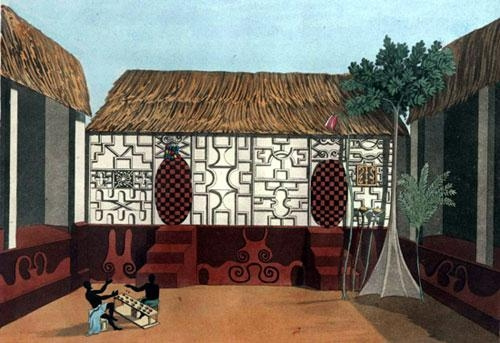
Architecture of the Ashanti Empire drawn by Thomas Edward Bowdich in 1817

Traditional Ashanti buildings were primarily constructed using a wattle and daub method, with a timber framework filled with clay and reinforced with bamboo, and had thatched roofs that were steeply pitched using raffia palm. This construction method utilised locally available materials, to adapt to the environment and resource availability.

Ashanti architecture is known for its 'fihankra' layout, where buildings are arranged around a central courtyard. Typically, a compound would consist of four rectangular rooms surrounding the courtyard, with the inner corners connected by splayed screen walls. Three of these rooms were open to the courtyard, while the fourth was partially enclosed, serving functions such as ritual activities or housing shrines.

Adrinka symbols

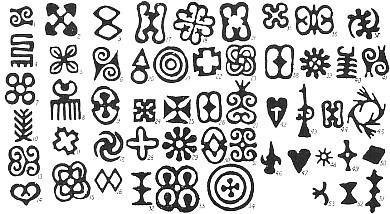
Adrinka symbols by Robert Sutherland Rattray

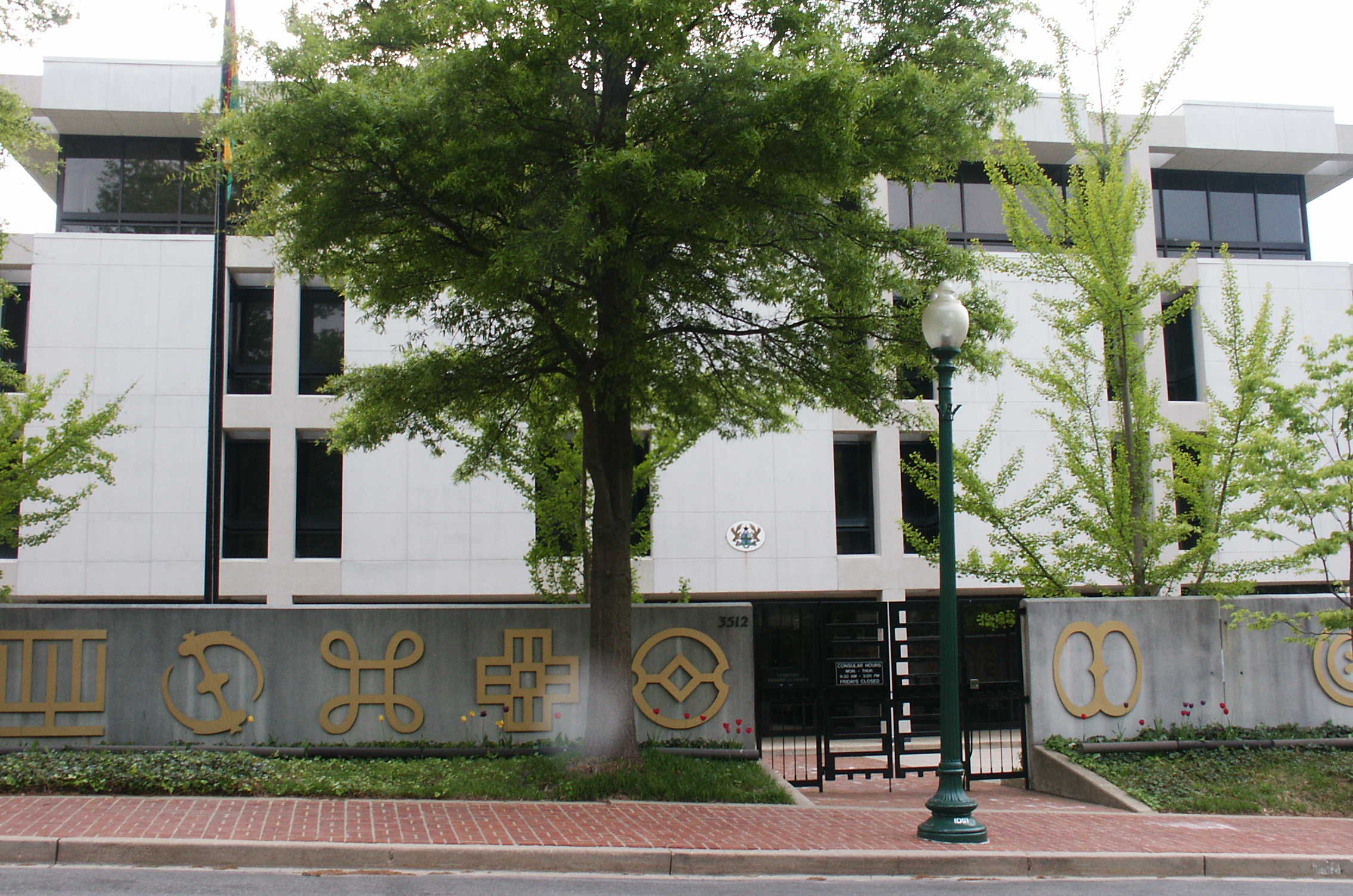
Adrinka symbols on the wall of the Embassy of Ghana in the United States

The walls of Ashanti buildings were plastered with mud, embellished with elaborate murals and bas-relief decorations featuring geometric patterns, animal motifs, and representations of plants. These designs often incorporated Adrinka symbols, each carrying specific meanings related to Ashanti beliefs and proverbs. The upper walls displayed interlacing geometric designs, and was painted with white clay, while the lower sections which were painted in red laterite featured bodily modelled bas-reliefs polished to a dull shine. This artistry serves both aesthetic and communicative purposes.

The Asante Traditional Buildings near Kumasi, recognised as UNESCO World Heritage Sites, are the last surviving examples of this architectural style. This collection comprises 13 buildings located across ten sites. Much of the empire's architecture was destroyed during British raids in the 19th century, leaving these buildings as the last authentic remains of the Ashanti period.

=== Mole-Dagbani architecture ===
The spatial organisation of Mole-Dagbani settlements were hierarchical, with the chief's hut centrally positioned, and surrounded by the dwellings of family members and other community structures.

Symbols were important features in Mole-Dagbani architecture. Important structures, such as palaces, incorporated cultural symbols like the tortoise, lion, crocodile, and leopard, representing wisdom, strength, and fertility.

== Colonial architecture (15th – 20th century) ==
Colonial architecture in Ghana emerged with the arrival of European powers, who introduced Western architectural styles in the 15th century. These merchants including the Portuguese, Dutch, Danish, and British, established trade posts, forts, and settlements along the Gold Coast. This period spanning until the early 20th century, saw the introduction of European architectural styles that melded with local traditions, resulting in hybrid forms.

The construction of forts and castles was a main feature of early colonial architecture in Ghana. These forts and castles along Ghana's coast were constructed over a 300-year period between 1482 and 1786, (Note: Most sources state that the forts and castles were constructed between 1482 and 1786, but a report by COMMARK Trust and the African World Heritage Fund gives the range as 1480 to 1790.) and were occupied at different times by European traders from countries such as Portugal, Spain, Denmark, Sweden, Germany, and Britain. Initially built to support the gold trade of European chartered companies, by the 17th and early 18th centuries, these structures later became central to the transatlantic slave trade. They linked trading routes, and acted as important market places for the gold and slave trades. By the 19th century, the efficiency of the forts began to decline as their functionality waned, and some were abandoned entirely.

The Castle of St George at Elmina, built in 1482 by the Portuguese, stands as the oldest European stone structure south of the Sahara, and was later expanded by the Dutch. This was followed by the construction of numerous forts, most of which were established in the 17th century when competition among European powers in the region intensified.

Cape Coast Castle, constructed by the Swedes in 1653, is one of the largest trade forts in West Africa. The British later took control of the castle in 1664. Initially a trade hub for gold, wood and textiles, it later became a centre for the slave trade, with added dungeons to accommodate more captives. After the abolition of the slave trade in 1807, the castle was repurposed as an educational and administrative centre.

Architecturally, these forts were typically designed as large squares or rectangles, with outer components consisting of four bastions or towers located at the corners. The inner-sections featured two or three-story buildings, some with additional towers, and often included enclosures, courtyards, or spurs. These designs were periodically modified and expanded by successive European powers to suit new needs, and many forts bear traces of these adaptations. While some structures remain intact, others have fallen into ruins due to environmental pressures and lack of maintenance. Most of these sites remained as architectural landmarks, and in 1979 designated as World Heritage Sites by UNESCO.

In the 19th century, European missionaries introduced new building typologies, including churches, schools, and training colleges. This included the Abetifi Presbyterian Church and Akropong Presbyterian Training College, constructed with local labour under European supervision. The latter is the second oldest higher educational institution in early modern West Africa. These buildings often used rammed earth, stone nog, and brick.

By the late 19th and early 20th centuries, colonial towns like Anomabo became centres of hybrid architecture, blending European and Ghanaian styles. This hybridisation was particularly prominent in the homes of elite Africans, who used mimicry architecture to assert wealth, modernity, and resistance to colonial dominance. These homes often combined: European-inspired designs, such as Palladian symmetry, arches, and verandas, and local construction methods using materials like laterite, rammed earth, and wattle and daub.

Colonial administrators in the Gold Coast also constructed government offices, railways, and military barracks. Under Governor Gordon Guggisberg in the early 20th century, projects such as Takoradi Harbour, Korle-Bu Hospital, and Achimota School were established. These projects predominantly employed European architects and engineers.

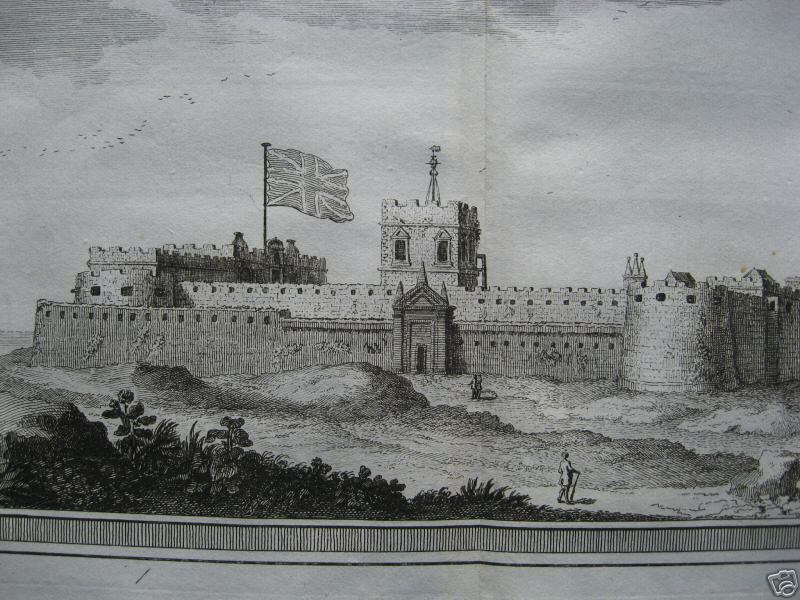
Cape Coast Castle in the 18th century by Jacques-Nicolas Bellin

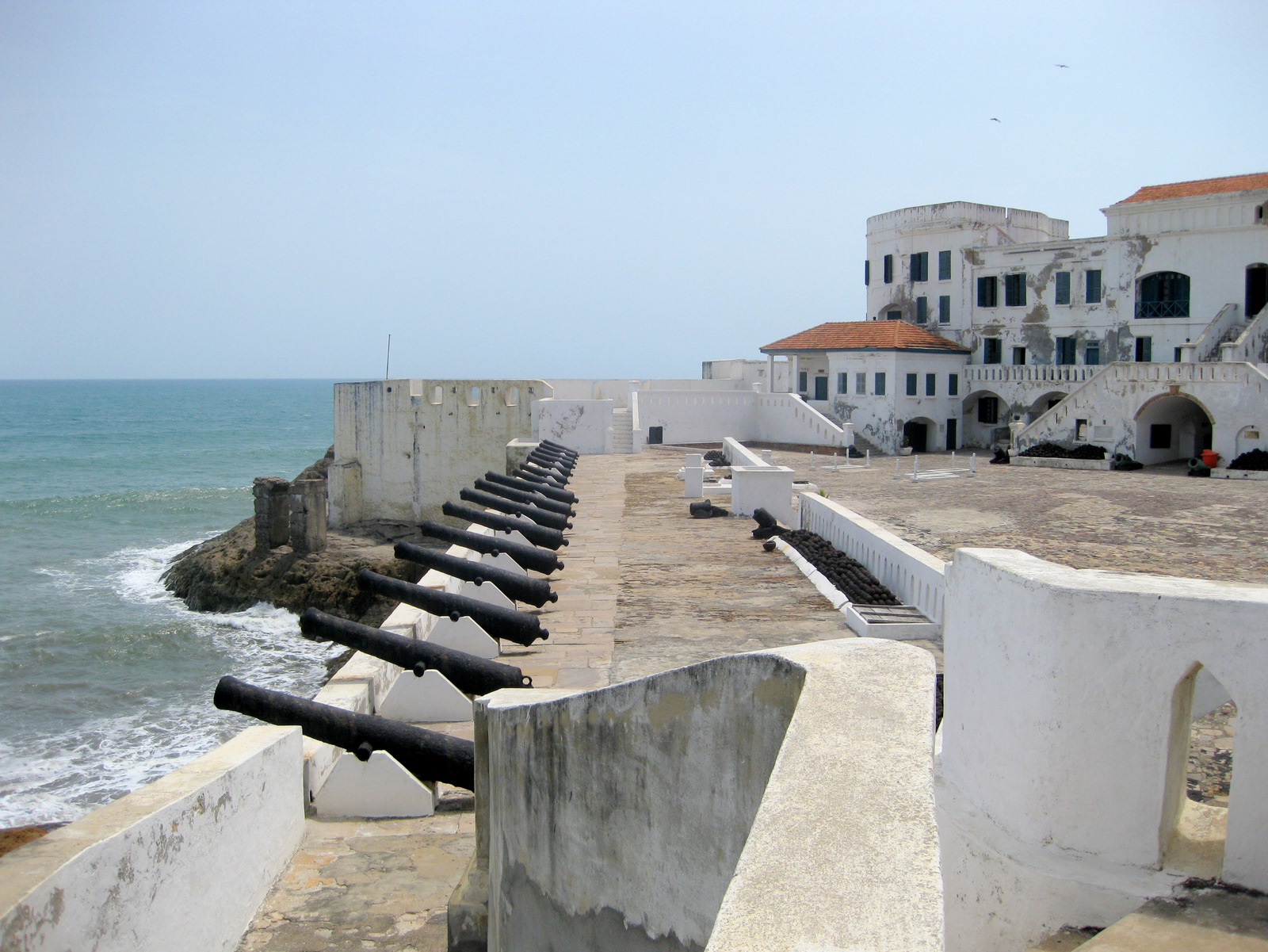
Cape Coast Castle, Cape Coast

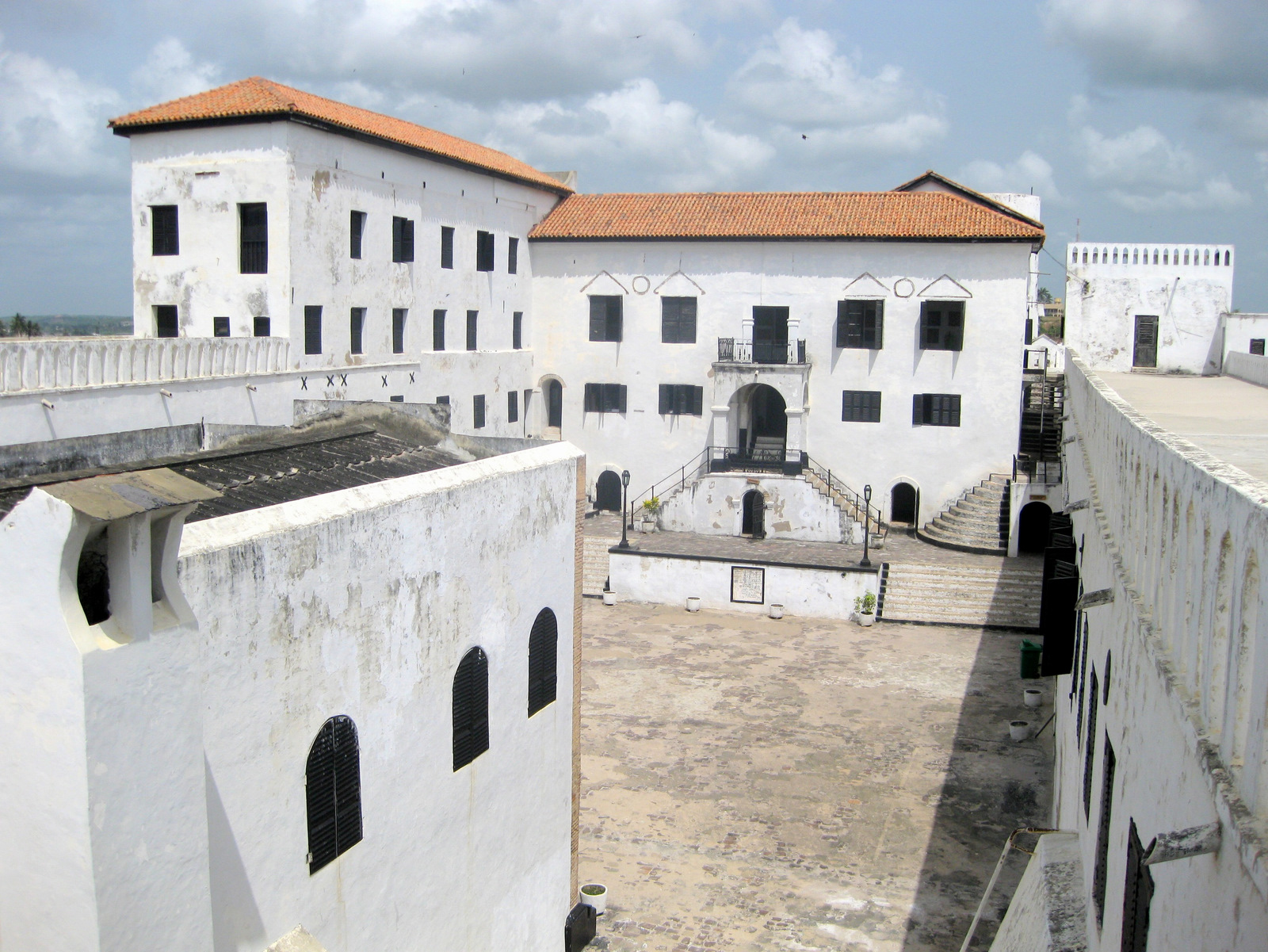
St. George Castle, Elmina

== Post-independence ==
Following Ghana's independence in 1957, its first president, Kwame Nkrumah initiated various architectural projects. During this era, several monumental structures were commissioned. Black Star Square, also known as Independence Square, in Accra, is one of these projects. Designed by Ghanaian architect Victor Adegbite, the square was constructed on former colonial playing fields. It features the Independence Arch, consisting of three parabolic concrete arches that support a presidential platform, flanked by stands with a capacity of up to 30,000 spectators. The arch has been described as symbolising a "door of no return", signifying efforts to encourage the African diaspora to reconnect with their heritage and contribute to the country's development.

Another project was the International Trade Fair in Accra. The centrepiece of the fair, the African Pavilion, featured a circular design with an aluminium roof, inspired by the royal umbrellas of the Akan chieftains and the baobab tree.

Various public buildings such as the Ghana's National Museum and Job 600, educational institutions like the University of Ghana's Legon Campus, and infrastructure projects such as the Ghana International Trade Fair Centre were designed to incorporate modernist principles while integrating local cultural elements.

Around the same period, the first indigenous architectural firm in Ghana, Associated Consultants was founded by engineers and two Ghanaian architects, D.S.K. Kpodo-Tay and S.G.T Kofi, both graduates of KNUST with master's degree in architecture. Subsequently, other indigenous firms followed, such as, Plan Architects, which was established by E.O Adjettey, a KNUST graduate with postgraduate training in urban planning from Edinburgh.

Following the 1972 Aliens Compliance Order, which led to the departure of many expatriate architects, some remained in Ghana and collaborated with local professionals to foster architectural development in the country.

=== Tropical Modernism ===
After Ghana gained independence, Tropical Modernism became a prominent architectural style in the country. It emerged as a response to the country's climatic conditions and socio-political context during the mid-20th century. This style combined modernist principles with designs suited to the tropical climate, incorporating features like brise soleil, wide overhangs, natural ventilation, and protective shade areas.

One of the early examples of Tropical Modernism in Ghana is the Unity Hall at Kwame Nkrumah University of Science and Technology (KNUST), designed by Ghanaian architect John Owusu Addo. The building integrated climate-responsive features such as cross ventilation and shading devices while reflecting modernist aesthetics.

Foreign architects also contributed to the development of this style in Ghana. British architects Maxwell Fry and Jane Drew, influenced several public and private structures in Accra. They emphasised on adapting international modernist designs to the local environment, and helped to shape the architectural landscape of this era.

Beyond functionality, Ghanaian Tropical Modernism also incorporated cultural elements and symbols. Local motifs and traditional construction methods were often integrated into the facades and interiors of buildings. Public buildings such as the Ghana National Museum featured local materials and design motifs, for modernity and tradition. It also features faceted walls angled to allow for cross ventilation and a shallow dome made of reinforced concrete clad.

Some Ghanaian architects adopted much of the architectural philosophy that "Form follows function", which defined much of the Ghanaian Tropical Modernist style, while other architects opted for a more expressive design philosophy, where form was influenced by, but not strictly bound to, function.

== See also ==
- Architecture of Africa
- History of Ghana
- List of castles in Ghana
- Asante Traditional Buildings

== Bibliography ==
- Agyekum, Kofi; Kissi, Ernest; Danku, James Coffie (2020). "Professionals' views on vernacular building materials and techniques for green building delivery in Ghana". Scientific African. 8 e00424. Bibcode:2020SciAf...800424A. doi:10.1016/j.sciaf.2020.e00424. ISSN 2468-2276.
- Winterhalter, Shannon Marie (2017), Building a New Nation: The Modern Architecture of Ghana (PDF) (Master's thesis), Athens, Georgia: University of Georgia
