= Schardo Mitch =

Ghanaian content creator

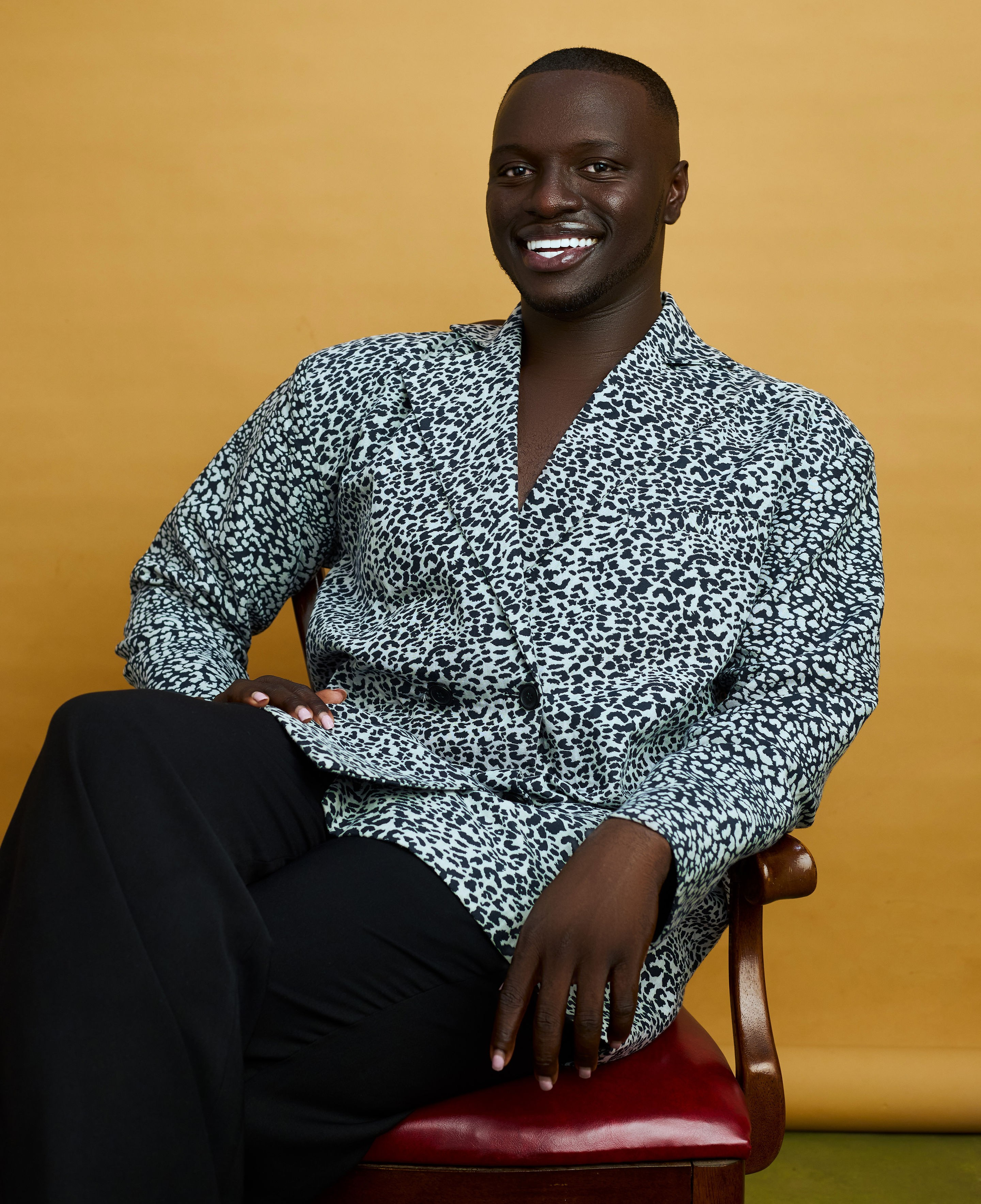
- Born: Padmond Annor Jr. Sefwi Wiawso, Ghana
- Education: National Film and Television Institute, (Diploma in Film and Television Production)
- Occupations: Social media personality, Film Director, Content Creator
- Known for: Co-Founder, Smile4mation

TikTok information
- Page: Schardo Mitch
- Years active: 2022–present
- Followers: 700K
- Last updated: 6 May 2026

Padmond Annor Jr., also known as Schardo Mitch, is a Ghanaian content creator and film director.

== Early life and education ==
Schardo Mitch' was born in Sefwi Wiaso and has a twin brother, Nana Mitch. He attended Grace Preparatory School but later moved on to Great Faith Preparatory School in Santasi Anyinam, Kumasi for his primary education. He completed Junior High School at Better Best Academy in Tema.

Schardo Mitch attended the Abuakwa State College for his senior high school education and graduated in 2016. He later earned a Diploma in Film and Television Production from the National Film and Television Institute.

== Career ==
Schardo founded Schardo TV and productions with his twin, Nana Mitch, an entertainment page meant to provide some comic relief to social media users.

Schardo Mitch and his twin brother Nana Mitch founded a fragrance brand called Relief by MB. In 2024, the Mitch brothers released a documentary titled From Sefwi to Accra which recaptured their upbringing and how far they have come.

== Ambassadorial deals ==
Schardo Mitch is a social media influencer who has had brand ambassadorial deals with Ghanaian and Nigerian brands such as Jazzy Burger, Duffy's Health & Beauty, Clozar Africa, LifeTaste, CompuGhana, Pizzaman Chickenman, SMS Properties, Ridge Condos and Jays Finder.

In October 2026, Schardo Mitch and his twin brother, Nana Mitch, partnered with The Or Foundation as cultural ambassadors for its Obroni Wawu October (OWO) 2026 Festival.

== Awards and nominations ==
Year	Award	Category	Result	Ref.
2023	Ghana Modeling & Fashion Awards	Media Fashion Personality of the Year	Nominated	
2023	Young Achievers Summit & Awards	Content Creator of the Year	Nominated	
2024	Ghana Entertainment Awards, USA	Social Media Influencer of the Year	Nominated	
2025	Ghana Creators Festival	Creator for Change	Nominated	
2025	Africa Golden Awards	Viral Content Creator	Nominated	
2026	15th Goldbold RTP Awards	TikTok Influencer of the Year	Nominated	
2026	Forty Under 40 Awards Ghana	Philanthropy and Charity	Won	

== Philanthropy ==
=== Smile4mation ===
Smile4mation is a philanthropic initiative co-founded by Schardo Mitch and his twin brother, Nana Mitch, known together as the Mitch Brothers. It focuses on celebrating and supporting the hardworking individuals in their communities who strive to improve their lives despite being disadvantaged. The goal is to celebrate and uplift everyday people whose hustles keep our societies going. They do this through cosmetic and wardrobe makeovers, providing tools, branding and financial aid.

In December 2025, Schardo Mitch and his twin brother Nana Mitch celebrated their 28th birthday by partnering with Ghanaian electronic company Electroland Ghana Limited and Homeland to help renovate a building for Grace a mother of four. And also gave her seed capital to start a business.

They also celebrated Christmas with the kids and people of Domenase a small farming community in Aburi, Ghana.

In May 2026 in partnership with Indomie Ghana they collaborated to support selected mothers in Accra during the Mothers Day celebration.
