= Dulcie Boateng =

Ghanaian businesswoman

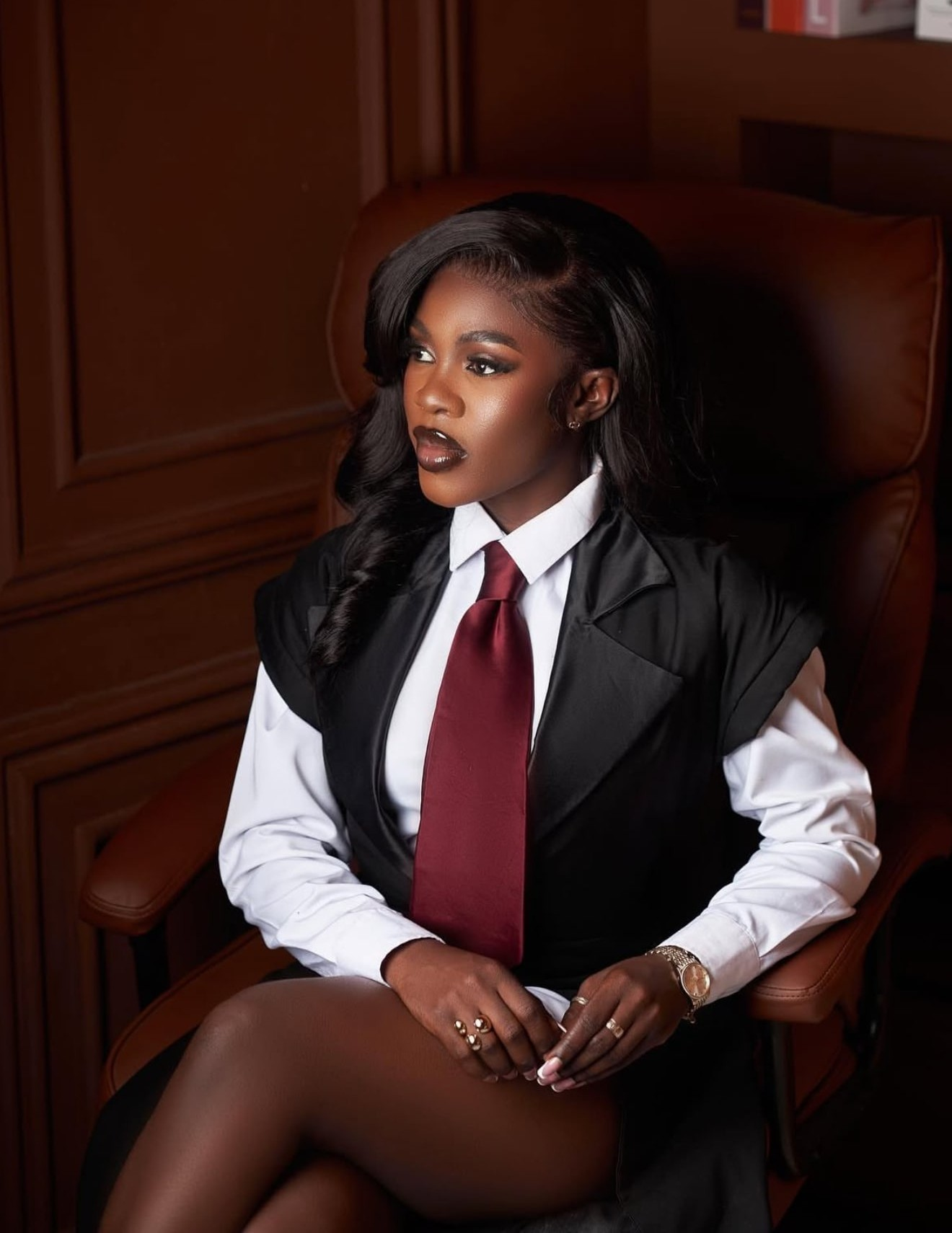
- Born: Dulcie Ewuraama Afriyie Boateng; Accra, Ghana
- Occupations: Social media personality, Business woman, Content Creator

TikTok information
- Page: Dulcie Boateng
- Followers: 221.5K
- Last updated: 4 September 2024

Dulcie Ewuraama Afriyie Boateng known as Dulcie Boateng is a Ghanaian business woman, social media influencer and CEO of Dulcie Porium.

== Early life and education ==
Dulcie Boateng was born in Asylum Down in Accra, Ghana. She attended Achimota School for her senior high school education and proceeded to Wisconsin International University College where she was awarded an undergraduate degree in Human resource management.

== Career ==
Dulcie began her career in 2017 at Onyx Night Club in Accra. During that period, she started an online retail business, using social media to market and sell her products. She later built a following on social media and became known as a social media influencer in Ghana.

In April 2024, Dulcie launched Porials Pitch, a shopping event held at Ghud Park in Accra Mall. The inaugural edition featured products from businesses owned by entrepreneurs from Ghana and Nigeria.

As a social media influencer, Dulcie has hosted several events in Ghana. In August 2024, she hosted Garage's All Black (The Continuum) event.

=== Ambassadorial deals ===
Dulcie has been a brand ambassador for Pizzaman Chickenman, YAH!, Leo Restaurant, Treatz N Bakez, Ridge Condos, and Clozar Africa.

=== Notable mentions ===
Dulcie Boateng was interviewed on The Delay Show.

== Awards and nominations ==
Year	Award	Category	Result	Ref.
2025	Ghana Entertainment Awards, USA	Social Media Impact Award	Nominated	
2024	Women’s Choice Awards Africa 2024	Social Media Influencer of the Year	Won	
2024	Ghana Entertainment Awards, USA	Social Media Influencer of the Year	Nominated	
2024	Ghana Outstanding Women Awards (GOWA)	Snapchat Influencer of the Year & Social Media Influencer of the Year	Nominated	
2023	Pulse Influencer Awards	Snapchat Influencer of the Year	Won	
2023	Visa King RTP Awards	Snapchat Influencer of the Year & Social Media Influencer of the Year	Nominated	
