= Angie Safo =

Ghanaian social media influencer

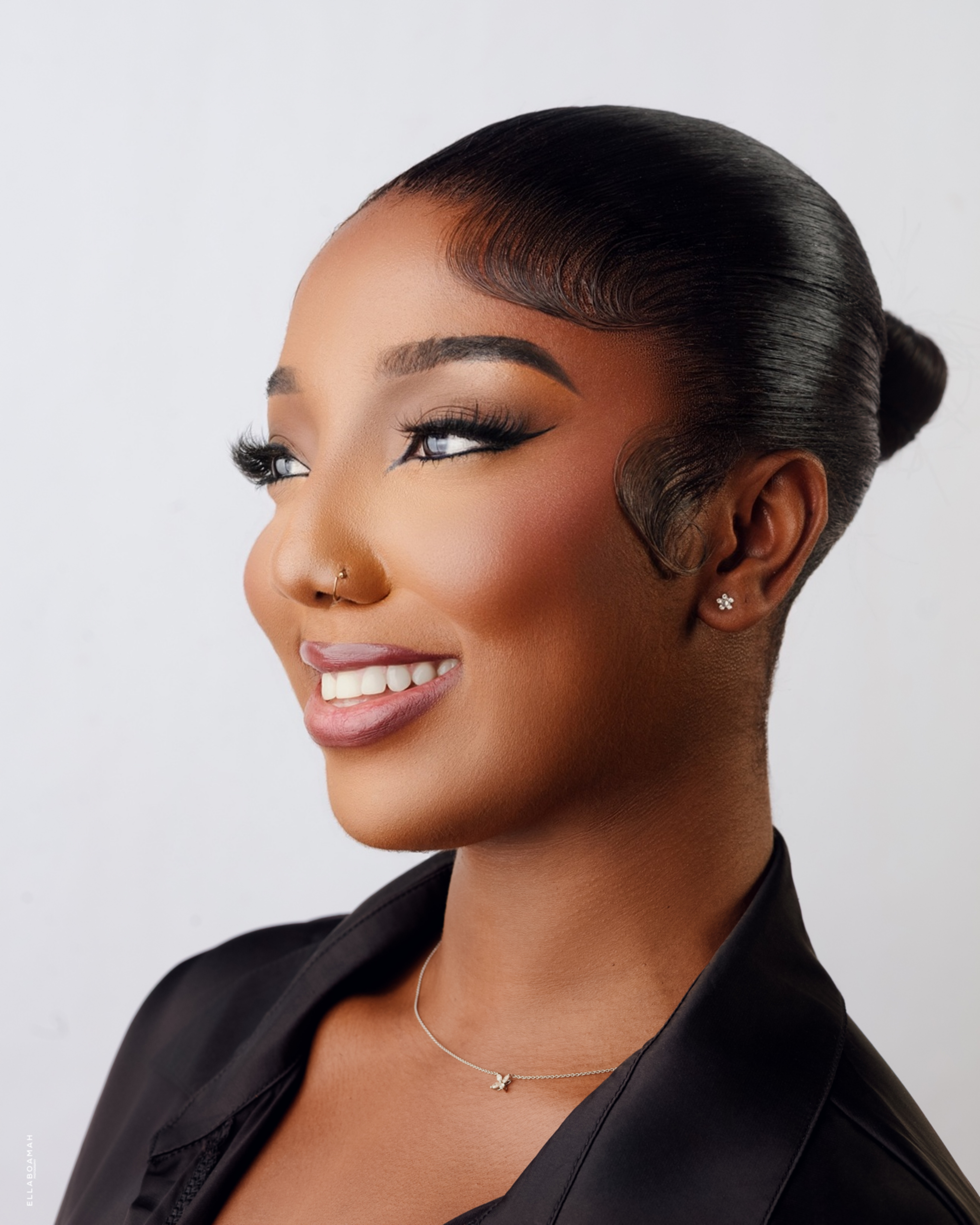
- Portrait of Angie Safo
- Born: Angela Nyamewaa Ama Safowaa; Accra, Ghana
- Education: Lancaster University Ghana (LLB)
- Occupations: Social media personality, entrepreneur, UGC creator, lifestyle influencer
- Known for: Founder and CEO of Shimmer by Khuks

TikTok information
- Page: Angie Safo
- Followers: 52.2K
- Last updated: 19 November 2025

Angela Nyamewaa Ama Safowaa, known professionally as Angie Safo or Nyamewaa, is a Ghanaian social media influencer, entrepreneur, user-generated content (UGC) creator, lifestyle influencer and the founder and CEO of the Ghanaian beauty brand Shimmer by Khuks.

== Early life and education ==
Angie Safo was born and raised in Accra, Ghana. She started her education at Tot To Teen School and continued her senior high school education at Apostle Safo School of Arts and Sciences. She later attended Lancaster University Ghana, where she earned a Bachelor of Laws (LLB) degree.

== Career ==
Safo began her career as a social media influencer in 2019. In 2020, during the COVID-19 pandemic, she founded her beauty brand, Shimmer by Khuks. In April 2025, the brand was rebranded and relaunched with new pigmented makeup products, including Blink and Go cluster lashes, Riding Rub cleansing balm, and an airy makeup bag. In July 2026, she also launched a second line under her beauty brand, called Kisses & Wishes.

She is also a host on the “Extra Xtra Show”, a podcast featuring discussions on celebrity news, viral social media moments, relationships, culture and youth-related issues.

== Brand collaborations and partnerships ==
Safo has collaborated with several Ghanaian brands, including serving as brand ambassador for Pizzaman-Chickenman (2021), Amadia Shopping Center (2023), Susuboxx (2023), and partnerships with Whole Beauty, Xoxorozay, and Yango Ghana.

In July 2026, she collaborated with TECNO Ghana in a month-long campaign for the CAMON Slim smartphone involving creating lifestyle content featuring the device, highlighting its features and everyday use.

== Awards and nominations ==
Year	Award	Category	Result	Ref.
2025	Influencers and Creators Choice Awards (iCCA)	Snapchat Influencer	Nominated	
2026	Africa Golden Awards	Africa Golden Top Female Lifestyle Influencer	Nominated	
