= Deloris Frimpong Manso =

Ghanaian entrepreneur, media personality and women's advocate

Delay
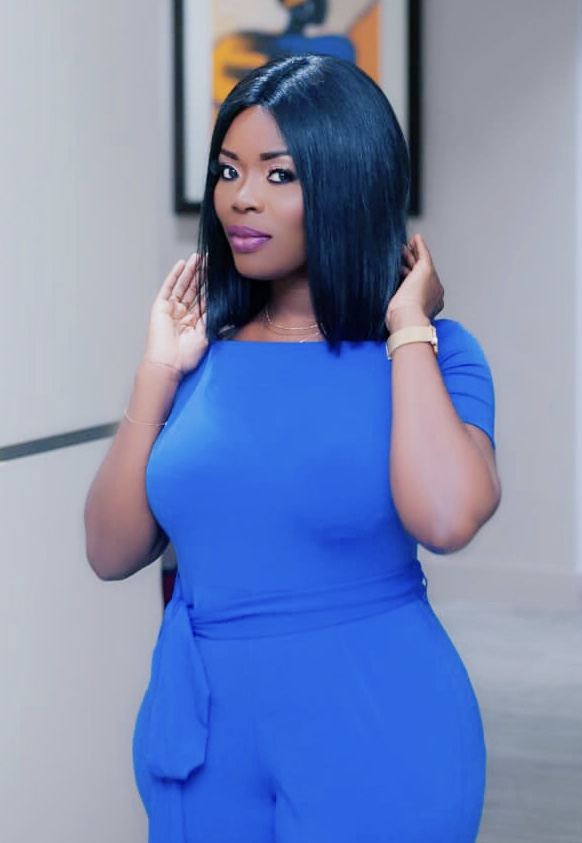
- Born: Deloris Frimpong Manso; 25 June 1982 (age 44); Nkawkaw Ghana
- Education: Aburi Girls' Senior High School and Methodist University College Ghana
- Occupations: Entrepreneur, TV and Radio Host, Producer, Public speaker and Women's Activist
- Years active: 1999–present
- Notable credit(s): The Delay Show, Host (2009–present) (Afia Schwarzenegger) Producer (2009–2016) and Cocoa Brown (2015-2018)
- Website: delayghana.com

Deloris Frimpong Manso (born June 25, 1982), popularly known as "Delay", is an entrepreneur, television and radio show host, producer, public speaker and Women's Advocate in Ghana. She has her secondary school education at Aburi Senior High School and continued to Methodist University College, Ghana.

== Career ==
=== Radio and Television ===
Delay started her broadcasting career as a presenter with Life FM in Nkawkaw in the Eastern Region of Ghana at the age of 17 in 1999. Delay later moved to Top Radio in 2005 in the capital, Accra where she worked until 2007. taking over the mid-morning show on that station. She was later hired by the newly established Oman FM in 2007, she stayed here until 2016.

Whilst she was working with Oman FM, Delay started her own television program, the Delay Show in 2008 on TV3 and she became a household name. In 2011, she wrote and produced the household television series, Afia Schwarzenegger. Her television production company, Maxgringo Productions brought out yet another television series ''Cocoa Brown'', a story loosely based on the true life of herself. She owns a company that produces mackerel and sardines.

=== Public speaking ===
Delay has also been engaged in public speaking, often sharing her life experiences to encourage women and the youth to strive to excel in life. She was in 2018 one of the main speakers at the 2018 International Youth Empowerment Summit (iYES) conference held at the National Theatre. Since then, Delay has spoken at a number of events, including the 2nd Women's CEO Summit as the main speaker; the event featured women occupying positions of responsibility sharing their life experiences on one platform to motivate others. Against all challenges, her narrative serves as a source of motivation for young individuals and entrepreneurs across the nation. She stands as a role model, often referred to as the "Oprah Winfrey" of the Ghanaian broadcast media sector. Delay also uses her life as an Entrepreneur, owning a company that produces Delay Mackerel and Sardines to motivate the youth and women to believe in themselves and to strive to establish their own businesses.

== Films and television ==
- The Delay Show is a controversial TV Show in the Ghanaian scene. She is the hostess and also an executive producer of the show.
- Cocoa Brown a TV drama

== Presidential ambition ==
Her ambition to serve as role model to women in the society doesn't seem to have any limitation as Delay recently announced her determination to become the first female President in Ghana by 2032. She believes nothing must hinder women from occupying some of the topmost positions in society and be involved in the running of the affairs of the country.

== Honours and recognition ==
In 2018, Delay received the Women Empowerment Award at the 3G Awards in New York, in recognition of her feminism and championing the course of women in society. She was also first on Pulse Gh list of five most industrious celebrities in the country in 2017. The year 2019 saw her been made one of the Ambassadors for iYES at the fifth edition of iYES launched in Accra. She won both the Most Outstanding Woman of the Year and Outstanding Woman TV Personality and Entrepreneur of Year at the third edition of the Ghana Outstanding Women Awards (GOWA) in 2020.
