= Richard Nii Armah Quaye =

Ghanaian entrepreneur and CEO

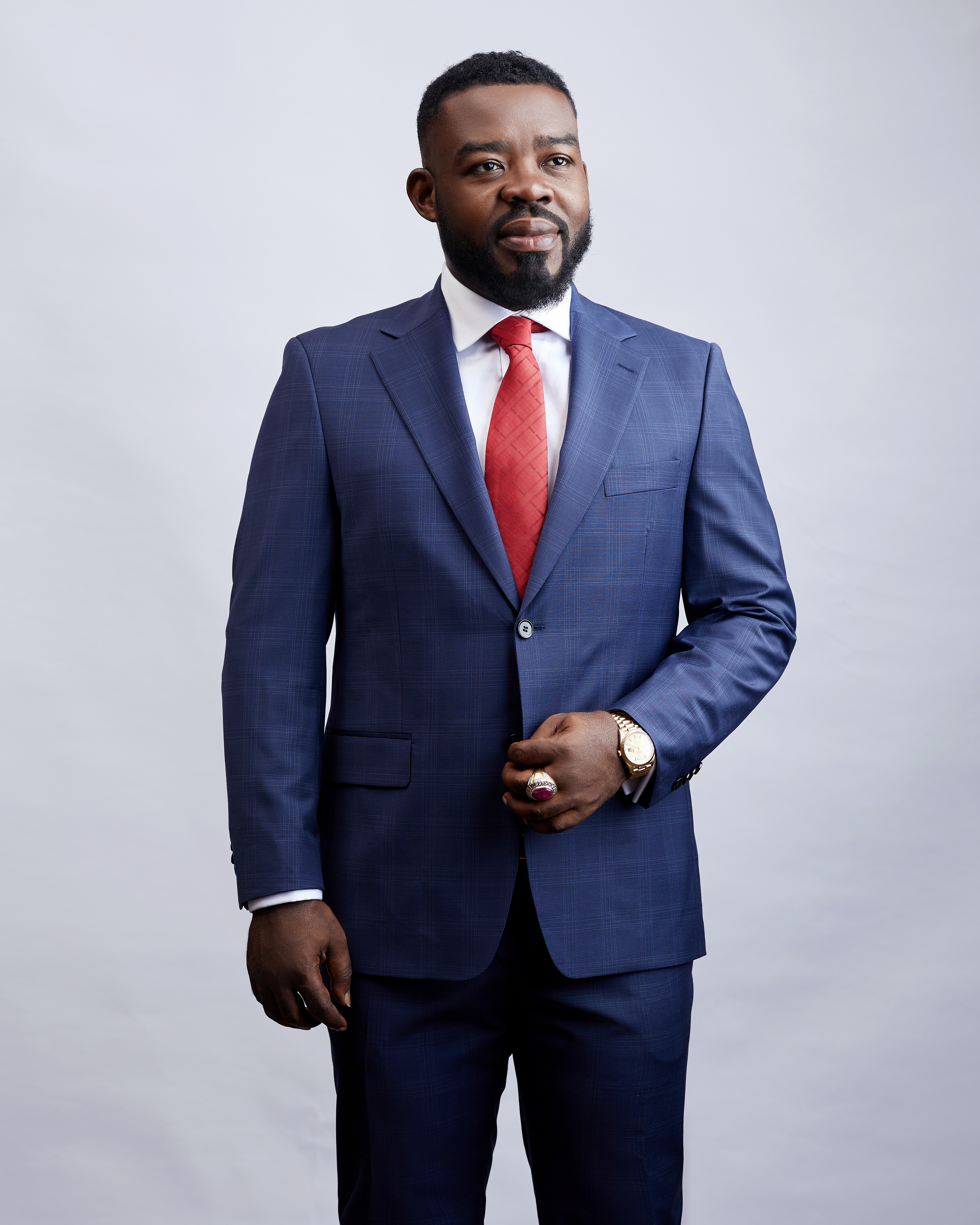
- Born: Richard Nii Armah Quaye; 21 March 1985 (age 41); Jamestown, Greater Accra Region
- Education: winneba Senior High School
- Occupations: entrepreneur, Investor
- Years active: 2009–present
- Known for: Founder of RNAQ Holdings, Philanthropy

Richard Nii Armah Quaye (born 21 March 1985) is a Ghanaian entrepreneur and Investor. He is the founder of Bills and Quick Angels Limited. As at April 2025, he stepped down as the CEO and board chairman of Quick Angels Limited and board chairman of Bills Micro Credit. He is currently the President of RNAQ Holdings, the parent company that holds Quick Angels Limited and Bills Micro Credit.

== Early life and education ==
Quaye was born on 21 March 1985 and hails from Jamestown in the Greater Accra Region of Ghana.

== Career ==
Quaye began his career as a businessman and founded Bills Micro Credit in 2009 and on 8 May 2019, he established the Quick Angels Limited that focuses on promoting start-ups and businesses in Ghana. The company has funded businesses such as Pizzaman Chickenman, Ridge Medical Center, Doughman Foods, CoLi Network, Goldcoast Food, Herbs and Spices, manufacturers of Sankofa Natural Spices, Addicent Foods, manufacturers of Benjie and Duke rice, Zaconut, and Burger King, among others.

In August 2019, he made a speech at the 3rd edition of the Entrepreneurs Forum by the Ghana Investment Promotion Council.

In December 2019, the Entrepreneurship Through Acquisition, a business club at the Harvard Business School invited him to speak at their 5th annual conference.

In April 2025, he began a new role as the President of RNAQ Holdings.

== Personal life ==
Richard Nii Armah Quaye is divorced from former wife Joana Quaye.

== Awards and recognition ==
In October 2019, Quaye won the Investment Award category of the 40 under 40 awards.

In September 2020, Quaye emerged as the overall winner in the 2020 40 under 40 awards at Kempinski Hotel in Accra. He again claimed the Investment Award category. He also won the European CEO Entrepreneur of the year 2020 award.

In May 2021, he also received the Outstanding financial service entrepreneur and the outstanding CEO in the 2021 11th Ghana Entrepreneur and Corporate Executive Awards. In July and August 2021, he received the Outstanding Business Investor Awards and the Outstanding Business Leader in the 2021 Ghana Business Standards Awards.

== Philanthropy ==
In 2025, it was announced the RNAQ Foundation was to roll out a Food Bank Project. This initiative is to feed underserved members of the public one free hot meal a day.

In August 2025, the Foundation donated GH₵500,000 to fund the study on youth opioids abuse in Ghana.
