= Nana Mitch =

Ghanaian Snapchat lens creator

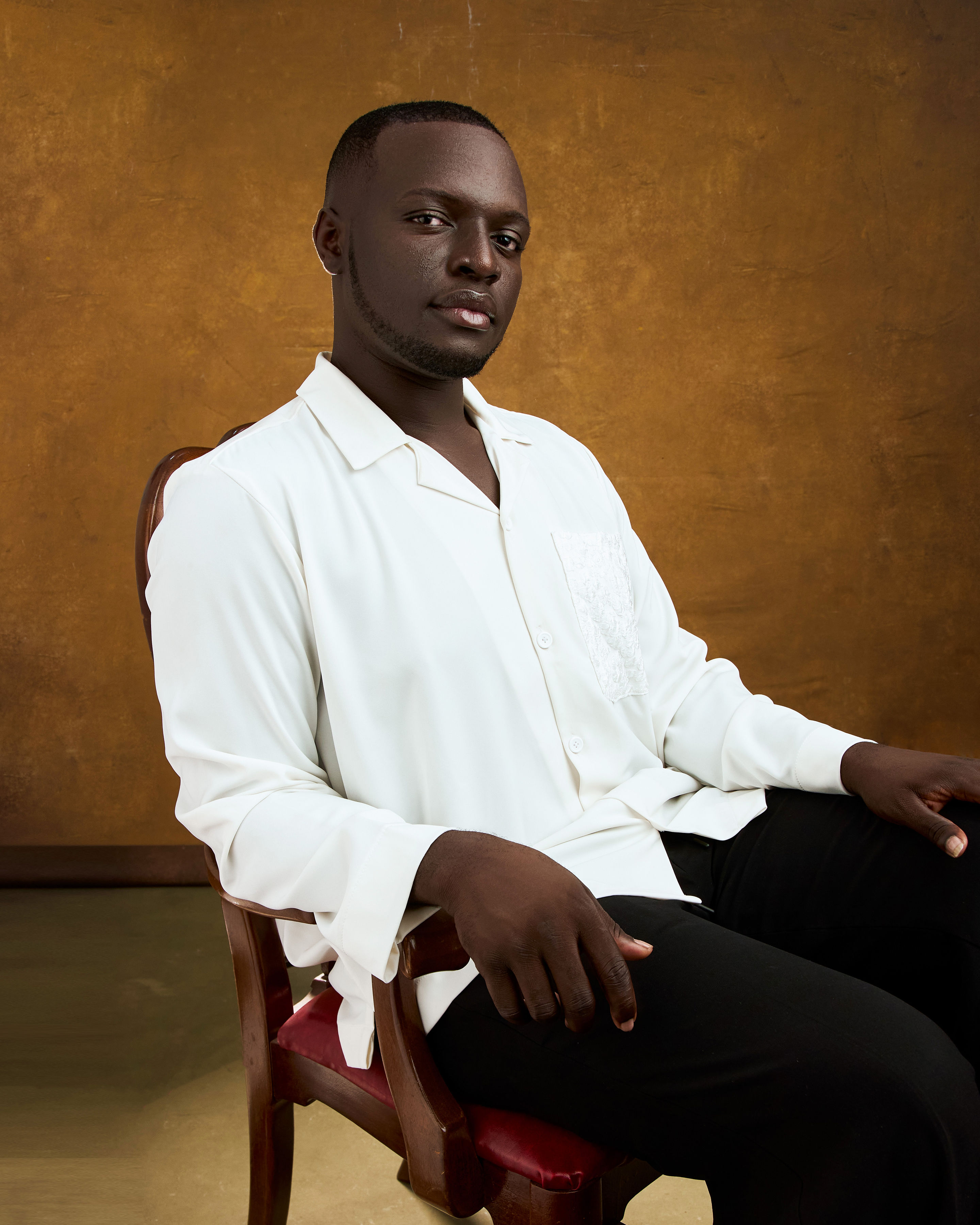
- Portrait of Nana Mitch
- Born: Padmond Annor; Sefwi Wiawso, Ghana
- Education: National Film and Television Institute, (BFA Film Editing)
- Occupations: Snapchat Lens Creator, Social media personality, Content Creator
- Known for: Co-Founder, Smile4mation

TikTok information
- Page: Nana Mitch
- Years active: 3
- Followers: 500K
- Last updated: 6 May 2026

Padmond Annor, also known as Nana Mitch, is a Ghanaian Snapchat lens creator, creative director, editor and content creator. He is known for his fashion and as the first Ghanaian Snapchat lens creator.

== Early life and education ==
Nana Mitch was born in Sefwi Wiaso and has a twin brother, Padmond Annor Jr, known as Schardo Mitch. He attended Grace Preparatory School and later moved on to Great Faith Preparatory School in Santasi Anyinam, Kumasi for his primary education. He completed Junior High School at Better Best Academy in Tema.

Nana attended Ofori Panin Senior High School for his senior high school education, and graduated in 2016. He later studied at the National Film and Television Institute, where he earned a BFA in Film Editing.

== Career ==
Nana Mitch started to create Snapchat lenses in December 2015, when he noticed a gap on the platform about Ghanaian lenses and culture. During the COVID-19 pandemic he signed up for a virtual lens studio class. He also co-foundered Schardo TV and productions with his twin brother. Nana Mitch and his brother have created content around various topics in Ghana, such as the country's 65th Independence Day.

Among his most notable creations is the ‘’4 More For Nana’’ lens he designed for the President of the Republic of Ghana, Nana Akufo-Addo, and modelling for Don Jazzy’s ‘’Jazzy Burger’’.

Nana Mitch has created custom Snapchat lenses for African entertainment personalities such as Bobrisky, Eniola Badmus, Sister Derby, Zlatan and Hajia4Real.

Nana Mitch and his twin brother Schardo Mitch founded a fragrance brand called Relief by MB. In 2024, Nana Mitch and his twin brother Schardo Mitch released a documentary titled From Sefwi to Accra which recaptured their upbringing and how far they have come.

=== Ambassadorial deals ===
Nana Mitch is also a social media influencer who has had brand ambassador deals with Ghanaian and Nigerian brands such as Pizzaman Chickenman, SMS Properties, Ridge Condos and Jays Finder. In 2024 he has been made a brand ambassador of the following companies Clozar Africa, Duffy’s Health & Beauty, LifeTaste, and CompuGhana.

In October 2026, Nana Mitch and his twin brother, Schardo Mitch, partnered with The Or Foundation as cultural ambassadors for its Obroni Wawu October (OWO) 2026 Festival.

=== Notable mentions ===
Nana Mitch was named among the Keep Walking Top 30 list of African creatives by Johnnie Walker and Trace TV as Africa's Next-Gen Cultural Shape Shifters.

== Awards and nominations ==
Year	Award	Category	Result	Ref.
2022	GhanaWeb Youth Excellence Awards	GhanaWeb Youth Excellence in Information Technology	Nominated	
2023	Young Achievers Summit & Awards	Content Creator of The Year	Nominated	
2023	Ghana Modeling & Fashion Awards	Media Fashion Personality of the Year	Nominated	
2023	Pulse Influencer Awards	Fashion Influencer of the Year	Nominated	
2023	Pulse Influencer Awards	Snapchat Influencer of the Year	Nominated	
2023	Visa King RTP Awards	Snapchat Influencer of the Year	Nominated	
2024	Ghana Entertainment Awards, USA	Social Media Influencer of the Year	Nominated	
2025	Pulse Influencer Awards	Snapchat Influencer of the Year	Nominated	
2025	Ghana Creators Festival	Creator for Change	Nominated	
2025	Africa Golden Awards	Viral Content Creator	Nominated	
2026	15th Goldbold RTP Awards	TikTok Influencer of the Year	Nominated	
2026	Forty Under 40 Awards Ghana	Philanthropy and Charity	Won	

== Philanthrophy ==
=== Smile4mation ===
Smile4mation is a philanthropic initiative co-founded by Nana Mitch and his twin brother, Schardo Mitch, known together as the Mitch Brothers. It focuses on celebrating and supporting the hardworking individuals in their communities who strive to improve their lives despite being disadvantaged. The goal is to celebrate and uplift everyday people whose hustles keep our societies going. They do this through cosmetic and wardrobe makeovers, providing tools, branding and financial aid.

In December 2025, Nana Mitch and his twin brother Schardo Mitch celebrated their 28th birthday by partnering with Ghanaian electronic company Electroland Ghana Limited and Homeland to help renovate the home of Grace a mother of four. And also gave her seed capital to start a business.

They also celebrated Christmas with the kids and people of Domenase a small farming community in Aburi, Ghana.

In May 2026 in partnership with Indomie Ghana they collaborated to support selected mothers in Accra during the Mothers Day celebration.
