= The Delay Show =

Ghanaian television program

The Delay Show is a Ghanaian television program hosted by Deloris Frimpong Manso. The TV program is a talk show that turns to interview industry players in Ghana and the diaspora as well.

== Appearance ==
The following personalities have been interviewed on the show.

- Sarkodie
- Dr. Kofi Amoah
- Sir John
- Amerado
- Akuapem Poloo
- Wayoosi
- Kwadwo Sheldon
- Dulcie Boateng
