= Kantamanto Market =

Market area in Accra, Ghana

Kantamanto Market Kantamanto Market
- Location: Accra, Ghana
- Address: Accra
- Opened: 1990; 36 years ago
- Manager: Accra Metropolitan Assembly
- Num. of stores: approx. 30,000+

Kantamanto Market is a market area located in the central business district of Accra, in Ghana. It is a well-known market in Accra with a specialization in clothing resale. It's also known as Accra's largest second-hand clothing market.

== Formation ==
The market was formed in the 90's

The site is an important part of the informal economy of the city. At its peak it was the largest used clothes market in West Africa.

The site received increasing international attention after sustainable fashion activists and journalists identified the market as one of the main receivers of imported unusable used clothing in the fast fashion industry. Before the COVID-19 pandemic, 40% of the garments that enter the market and are sorted by traders get discarded into landfills. The market and its informal economy play an important role in the city's economy, and COVID-19 restrictions greatly harmed the trade in the city.

A December 2020 fire, which some reports suggest were set by real estate developers, decimated the market. Though some vendors tried to return to the site, developers announced in March 2021 that they are building a new shopping center at the site.

== Market structure ==
There are over 30,000 traders in the market selling all kinds of wares from used clothing to food to car spare parts.

== Fires ==
Due to the congested nature of the market, whenever there is a fire outbreak the damage is always extensive. With the destruction of goods and structures running into several thousands of cedis. There are no fire hydrants in the market making it almost impossible to refill fire tenders which run out of water during fires. This story is similar to other markets in the country such as Kotokoraba market, Market Circle and the Kejetia market. A fire outbreak occurred in the market on Tuesday, 19 April 2011. Another fire erupted in the market in May 2013.

As the market gets increasingly congested, many traders have aired concerns ranging from expansion works to be done; improved fire safety to prevention of ejection.

In January 2025, a fire destroyed a significant portion of the market, displacing hundreds of traders. After the fire to the market in January 2025 The Or Foundation donated one million Ghana Cedis to the rebuilding of the Kantamanto market.

== Redevelopment ==
In March 2021, the real estate developer Golden Coast Developers announced a partnership with Kantamanto Traders Association and the Ministry of Railway as well as the Railway Development.

== Leadership ==
Following the fire in January 2025, a new association Kantamanto Obroniwawu Businesses Association (KOBA) was formed, uniting 13 sections of the market for the first time. KOBA aims to safeguard the market against future disasters while representing the interest of its members both globally and locally.

== In culture ==
Artist Sel Kofiga documents the cloth trade in the market through upcycling and mixed media art projects. Samuel Oteng organizes a similar upcycling company.

The Or Foundation and artist/activist Liz Ricketts organized an anti-fashion waste art project called "Dead White Man's Clothes" to examine the waste created by the textile import trade.
