= Cocoa Brown (TV series) =

- Written by: Gene Adu
- Directed by: Kofi Asamoah
- Starring: Caroline Sampson; Ahuofe Patricia
- Country of origin: Ghana

Production
- Producer: Deloris Frimpong

Original release
- Release: 2016

Cocoa Brown is a 2016 Ghanaian TV series produced by Deloris Frimpong Manso, written by Gene Adu and directed by Kofi Asamoah. The TV series was aired on Viast 1 before it was taken to GH One.

== Synopsis ==
The television series tells a story of Cocoa Brown a radio personality and challenges she face to rise as a superstar.

== Cast ==
- Ahuofe Patricia
- Eunice Banini
- Akorfa Edjeani
- Caroline Sampson
- Black Boy
- Root Eye
- Shatta Michy
