= Smile4mation =

Ghanaian media-based philanthropic initiative

- Formation: 2025
- Founders: Nana Mitch; Schardo Mitch
- Type: Philanthropic Initiative
- Headquarters: Accra, Ghana
- Website: smile4mation.org

Smile4mation is a Ghanaian philanthropic initiative founded in 2025 by twin content creators Nana Mitch and Schardo Mitch. The initiative gives charitable assistance to individuals and communities through funding from its founders.

== Philanthropic works ==
They started the initiative in June 2025 by donating baby care supplies to mothers and staff at the Komfo Anokye Teaching Hospital maternity unit in Kumasi.

In August 2025, they visited Lagos, Nigeria where they supported Emmanuel, a local business owner with financial assistance to rebuild his business.

Then in December 2025, the Mitch Brothers celebrated their 28th birthday called "MB28". In partnership with Ghanaian companies Electroland Ghana Limited and Homeland, they renovated the home of Grace, a single mother of four and provided seed capital for her business.

Also in December 2025, they ran a community outreach programme in Domenase celebrating Christmas with the community.

Collaborations

In May 2026, they partnered with Indomie Ghana for a Mother's Day outreach in Accra, where more than 40 mothers received hampers and gifts.

== Recognition ==
In November 2025, Nana Mitch and Schardo Mitch received a nomination in the "Creator for Change" category at the Ghana Creators Festival for their work with Smile4mation.

In July 2026, Nana Mitch and Schardo Mitch were nominated for the Forty Under 40 Awards Ghana in the "Philanthropy and Charity" category for their charitable work through Smile4mation.

In September 2026, Nana Mitch and Schardo Mitch were named winners of the "Philanthropy and Charity" category at the Forty Under 40 Awards Ghana.

== See also ==
- Charitable organization
- World Vision Ghana
