= Asante Traditional Buildings =

UNESCO World Heritage Site
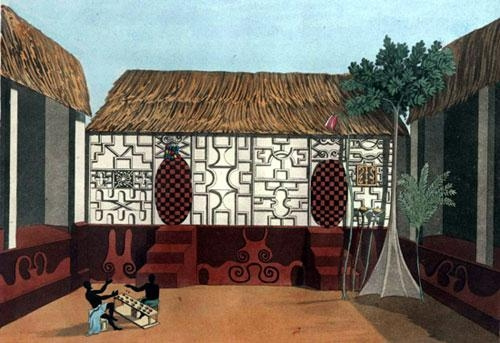
- Architecture of the Ashanti Empire drawn by Thomas Edward Bowdich in 1817

- Location within Ghana
- Location: Ghana
- Criteria: Cultural: (v)
- Reference: 35
- Inscription: 1980 (4th Session)
- Coordinates: 6°24′04″N 1°37′33″W

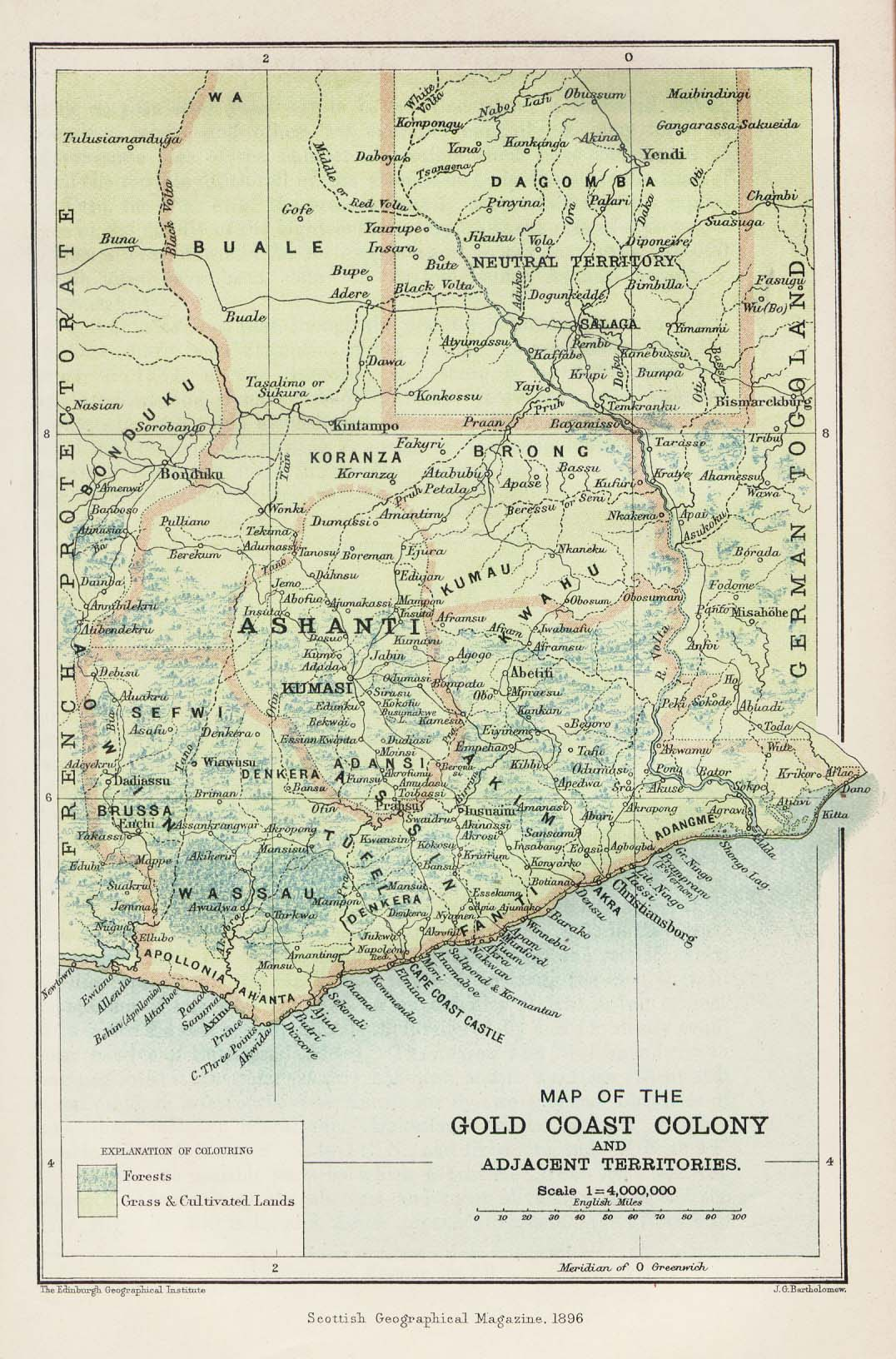
The Ashanti Empire and Gold Coast on a map from 1896.

The Asante Traditional Buildings are a collection of 10 traditionally built buildings from the time of the Ashanti Empire in the area near Kumasi. These buildings served as fetish houses and shrines during the 18th and 19th centuries, during the golden age of the Ashanti Empire. When the empire fell during the British occupation of the area from 1806 to 1901, most Asante buildings of the period were destroyed during the era. Among other buildings, the royal mausoleum was destroyed by Robert Baden-Powell in 1895. The 10 remaining buildings are the last remains of the history and culture of the Asante people and were inscribed on the UNESCO World Heritage List in 1980.

== Overview ==
The buildings were described as "home of men and gods". The houses are arranged around courtyards, and are built of timber, bamboo and mud plaster. The construction style is called wattle and daub. The walls of the buildings are covered in bas-reliefs, with spiral and arabesque forms and representations of animals, birds and plants. These reliefs consist of traditional Adinkra symbols, having unique symbolic meanings associated with Asante culture and were passed down over generations. The shrines consist of four rooms facing a central courtyard, built on a raised plinth. Three of the rooms were used for ritual activities, while the fourth was designated for the shrine itself, to which access was restricted.

== Modern era ==
The traditional religion is still practiced at the shrines, which is the reason for their survival and maintenance. However, because they were built out of mud and straw, the Asante buildings are vulnerable to natural fluctuations. The disruption of regular maintenance cycles and decline in religious use threatens the preservation of the buildings.
