= The Or Foundation =

Non-profit organization in US and Ghana

- Founded: 2011
- Founders: Liz Ricketts; Branson Skinner
- Type: 501(c)(3) charitable organization
- Location(s): Accra; Ghana, U.S.
- Website: https://theor.org/

The Or Foundation is a non-profit organization operating in the United States and Ghana that works at the intersection of environmental justice, education, and fashion development.

== History ==
The Or Foundation was co-founded in 2011 by Liz Ricketts and Branson Skinner with its primary mission to identify alternatives to the dominant linear model of the fashion industry. In 2016 the non-profit shifted gears from educational programming to focus on supporting Kantamanto Market, which sees an estimated 15 million secondhand garments every week from countries like the USA and UK with 40% of these garments leaving the market as waste.

In 2024, the foundation launched a collection of upcycled clothing by independent Ghana artists on Vestiaire Collective. In January 2025, after the fire of the Kantamanto Market in Accra, the foundation committed $1 million in support of emergency fire relief efforts, and committed to finance the electrification and installation of a security system throughout the new market. The Ghana Used Clothing Dealers’ Association (GUCDA), which represents importers of secondhand clothing, accused The Or Foundation of publishing false data aiming to tarnish the image of the used clothing sector in Ghana. However, the market traders responded in support of the non-profit.

In 2026, The Or Foundation launched the Apparel Recovery Coalition alongside H&M Group, adidas, BESTSELLER and Inditex to explore Extended Producer Responsibility (EPR) funds can be used to better support the management and responsible disposal of textiles and how brand contributions can follow textiles all the way to the end of life to countries such as Ghana. The launch of ARC follows The Or Foundation's decade-long advocacy for Globally Accountable Extended Producer Responsibility policies, ensuring that the communities who shoulder the strongest burden for the overproduction and overconsumption in wealthy Global North countries.

== Activities ==
The foundation is known for its on-the-ground research and direct-action programs centered on the Kantamanto Market in Accra, Ghana, the world's largest market for secondhand clothing.

The foundation contributes to the Speak Volumes campaign which demands major clothing manufacturers to publicly disclose the real volume of their annual production.
