= Ghana Trade Fair Center =

- Interactive map of Ghana Trade Fair Center
- Location: Labadi, Accra
- Owner: Minister for Trade and Industry (Ghana)
- Operator: Ghana Trade Fair Authority

Website
- www.tradefairgh.com

The Ghana Trade Fair Center is the largest fairground located in Labadi in the Greater Accra Region of Ghana. It is a trade fair that was designed to stimulate the country's international trade and to carry forward his vision of pan-African union. The center has shops, exhibition halls, clinics, and pavilions.

== History ==
The Trade Fair Center was designed and constructed from 1962 to 1967 by the Ghana National Construction Corporation (GNCC). The chief architect was Victor Adegbite from Ghana. The designers of the fair were two architects from then socialist Poland, Jacek Chyrosz and Stanisław Rymaszewski. The fair was initiated by Ghana's first President Dr. Kwame Nkrumah in order to stimulate the country's international trade and to carry forward his vision of pan-African union.

The trade fair center and its first international trade fair was opened on February 1, 1967 by Joseph Arthur Ankrah, the then Head of State.

== Facilities ==
The center lies on a 127-acre land it has shops, exhibition halls, clinics and stands. There are several pavilions, among them Pavilion A, Pavilion B and the round Africa Pavilion.

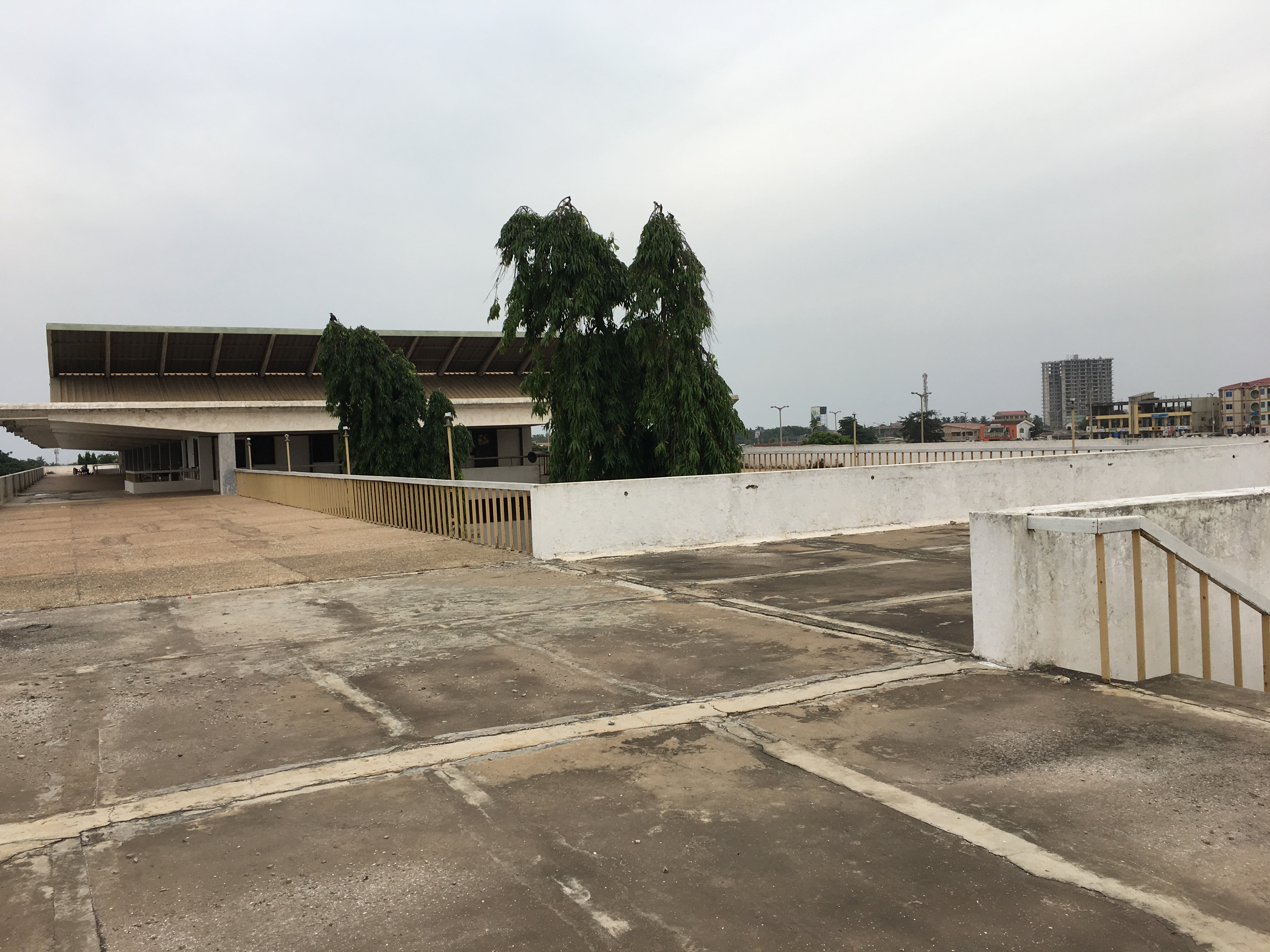

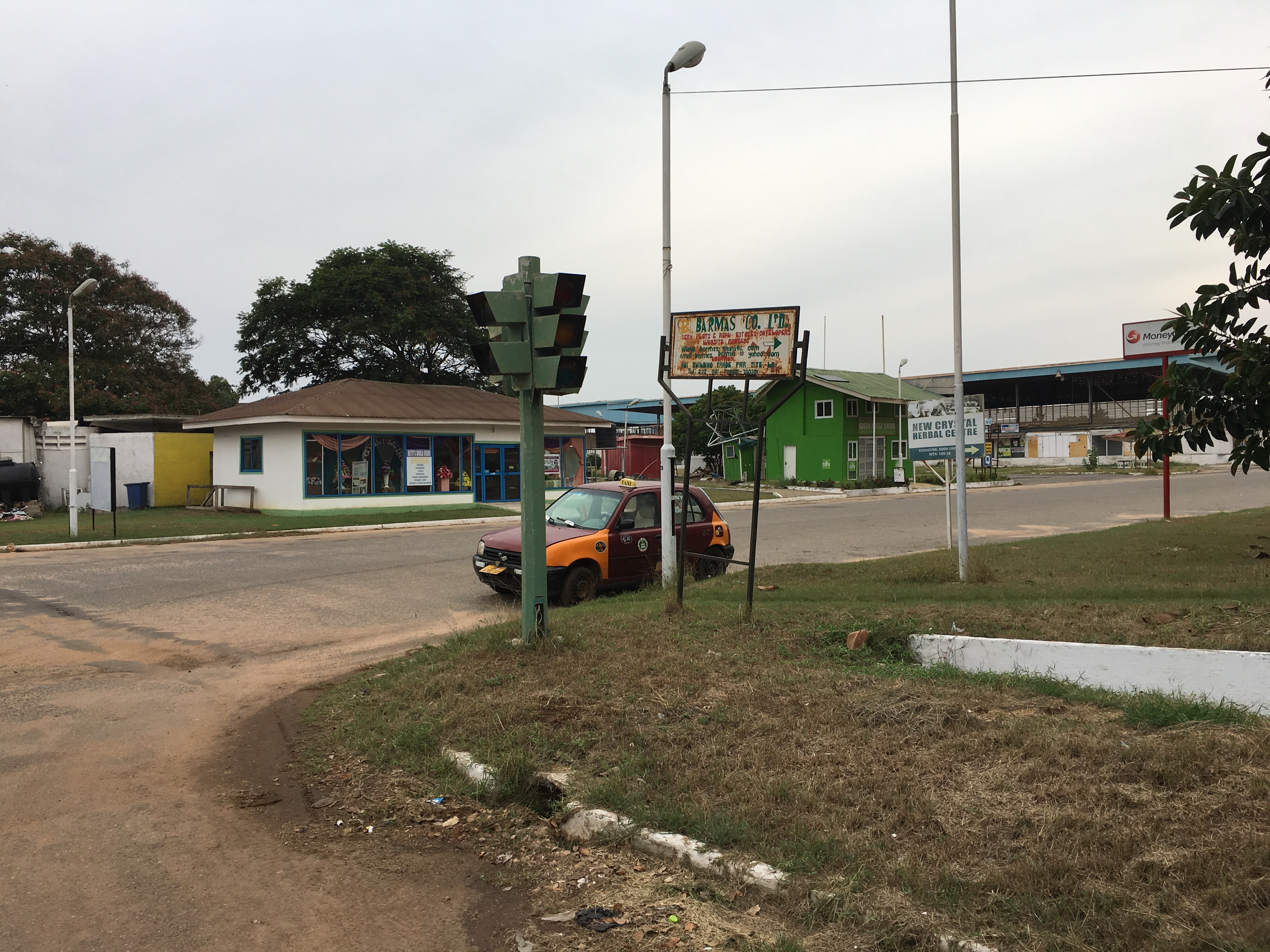

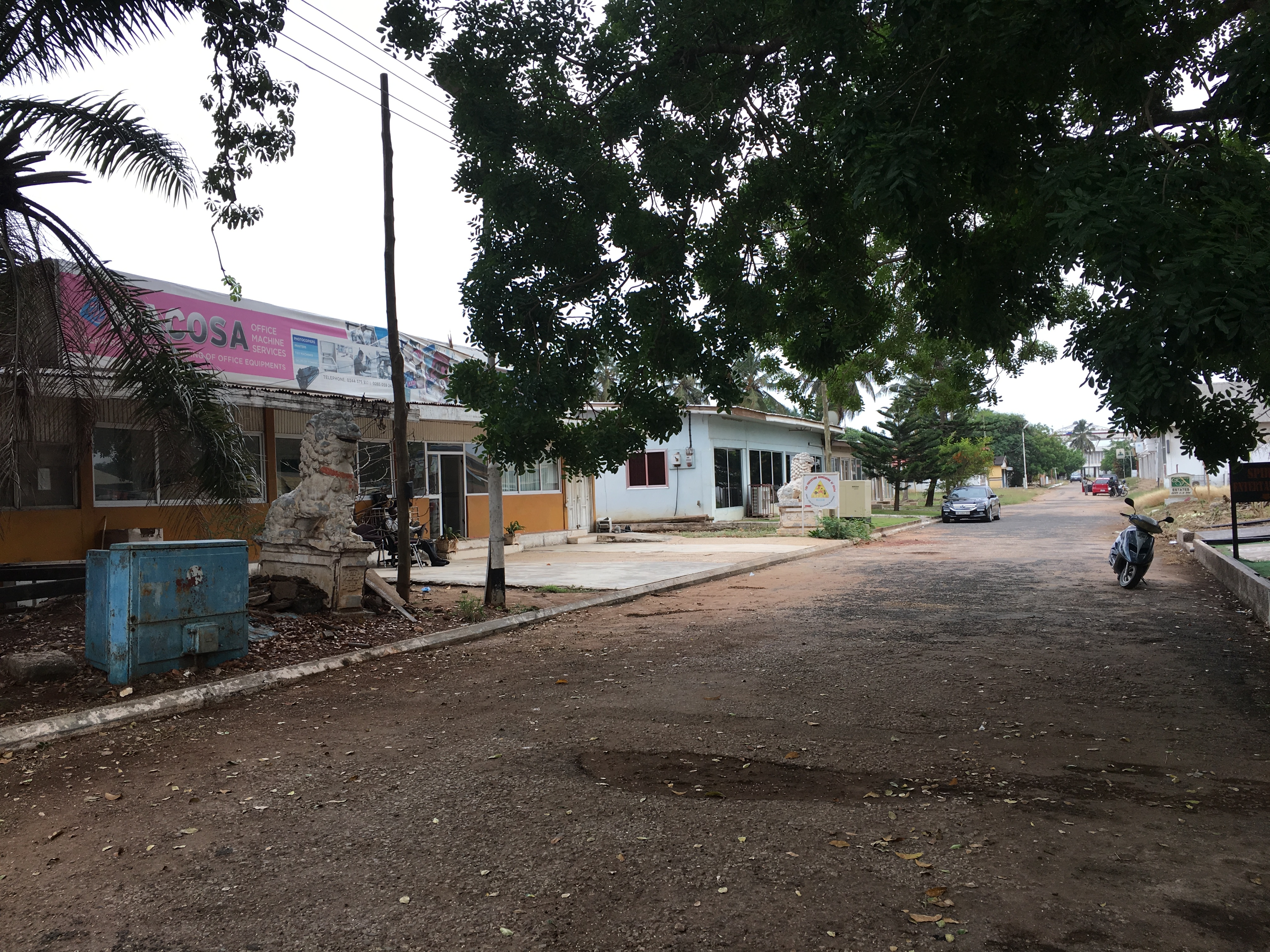

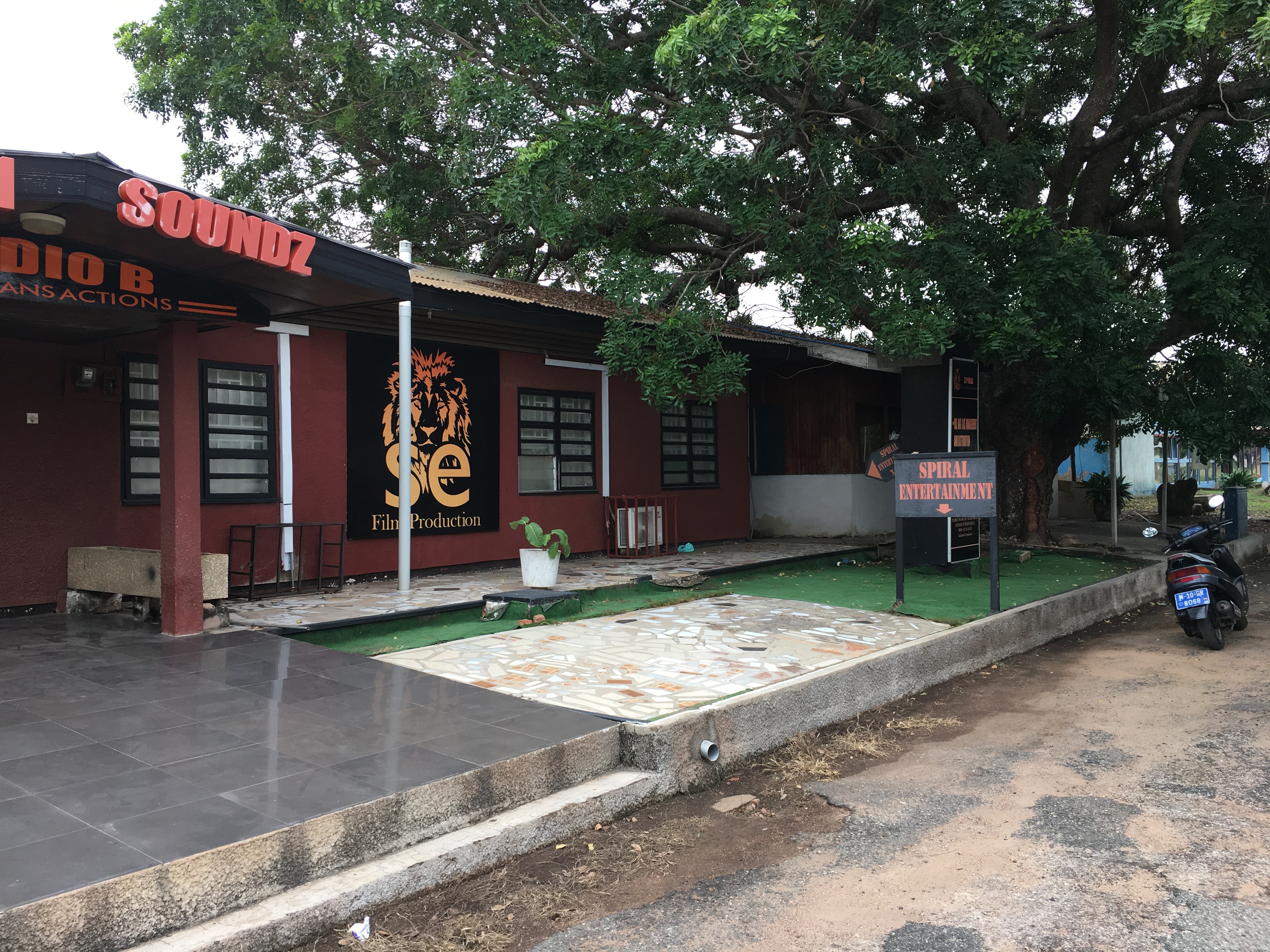

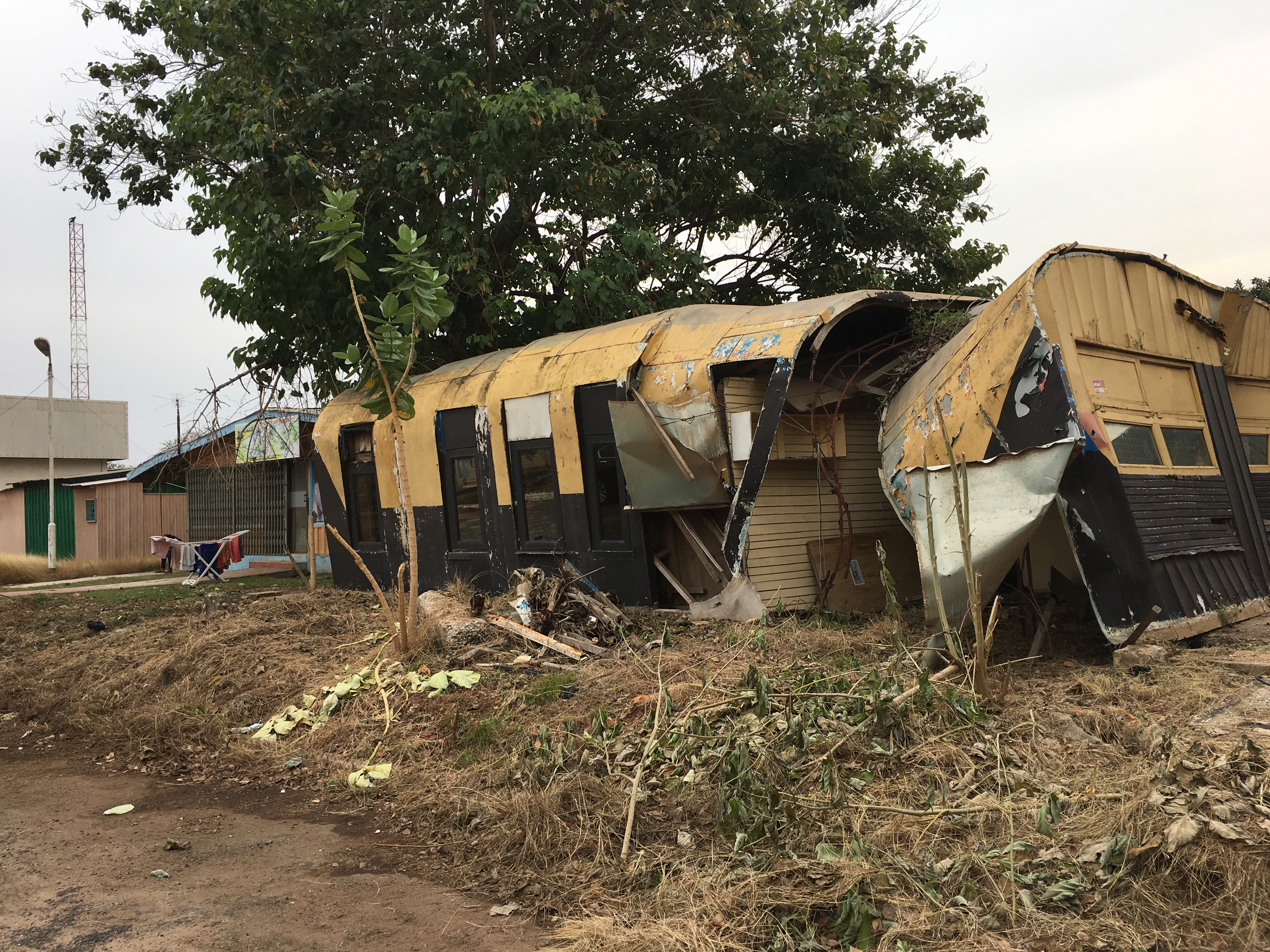

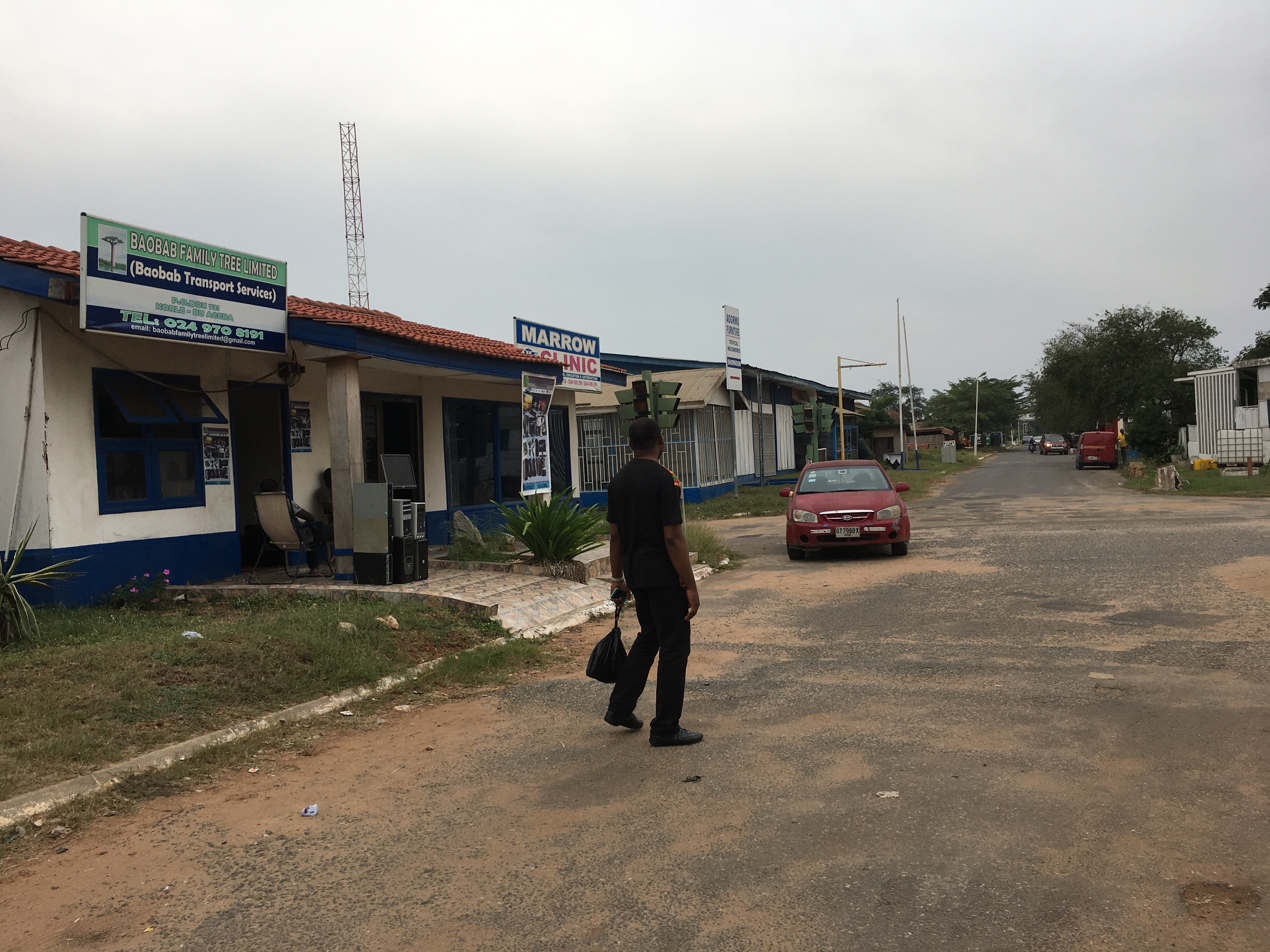

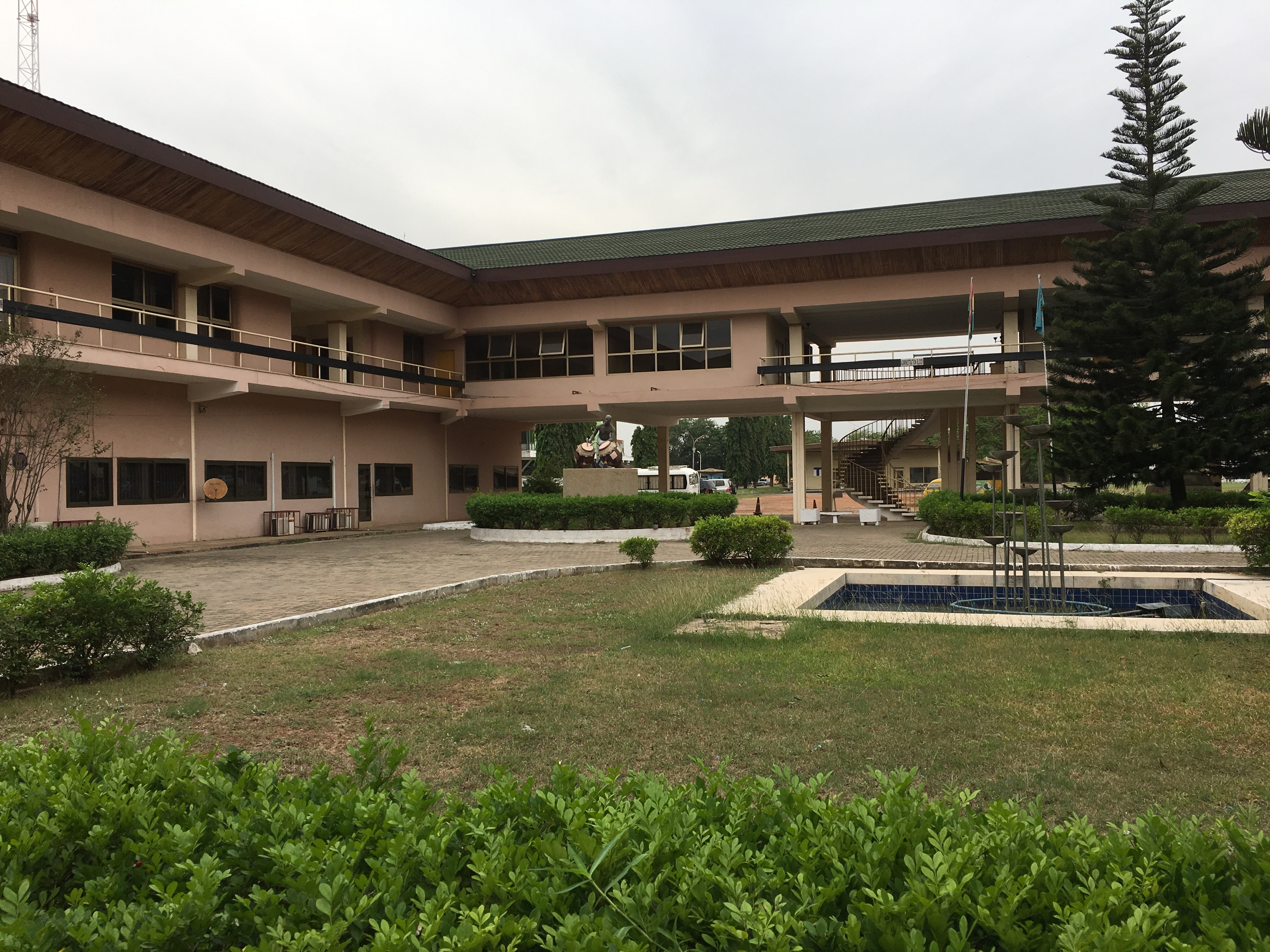

== The Africa Pavilion ==
The Africa Pavilion was designed by the Polish architects Jacek Chyrosz and Stanisław Rymaszewski. For the building, they chose a round form with an aluminum roof - a reference to two symbols of power in West Africa: the umbrella and the baobab tree. The aluminum sheets for the round roof of the Africa Pavilion were shipped from Britain. The iconic round roof collapsed in April 2007.

== Events ==
The Trade Fair Center has hosted numerous events both local and international. These include Trade Fairs, musical concerts etc. Some events include:

- 7th ECOWAS trade fair (2013)
- re:publica Accra (2018, https://re-publica.com/en/page/republica-accra%5B%5D)

Media related to Ghana Trade Fair Center at Wikimedia Commons
