= Pizzaman-Chickenman =

Ghanaian restaurant

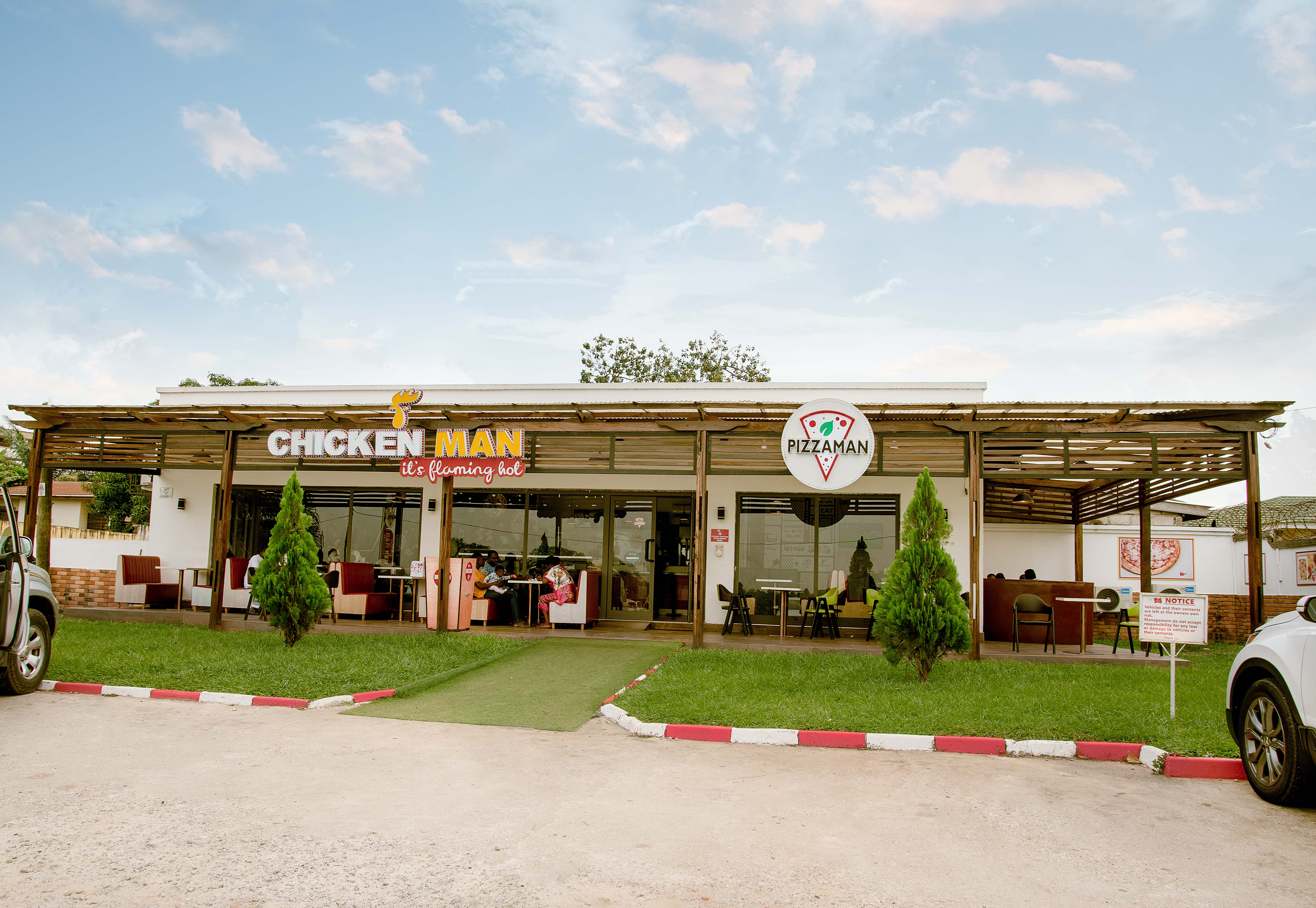
- Pizzaman-Chickenman's first branch at KNUST, Mango Road in Kumasi
- Industry: Foodservice
- Founded: January 2018; 8 years ago in Kumasi, Ghana
- Founders: Christian Boakye-Yiadom; Ebenezer Essuman-Amankawah
- Headquarters: Osu, Ghana
- Area served: Ghana
- Key people: Richard Nii Armah Quaye (Chairman)
- Products: Chicken wings; Dessert; Jollof; Pizza; Fried rice
- Services: Food delivery
- Parent: CEQA Food and Beverages Ghana Company Limited
- Website: https://ceqaltd.com

CEQA Food and Beverages Ghana Company Limited (popularly known as Pizzaman-Chickenman) is a Ghanaian fast-food outlet which serves pizza, chicken, Ghanaian jollof and fried rice across Accra and Kumasi. It has the largest chain of restaurants in Ghana. The company's Ahodwo branch is the first ever pizza joint that run for 24 hours in a week which served chicken, pizza and various rice meals in Ghana. As at September 2025, the company has over 89 branches across Ghana.

== History ==
The company was established in January 2018 on the KNUST Mango Road in Kumasi. In December 2021, the company partnered and were financed by Quick Angels Investor Company alongside over 32 companies in Ghana. Christian Boakye-Yiadom and Ebenezer Essuman-Amankawah started the company. Christian is currently the CEO of the restaurant whilst Ebenezer is also the Chief Operations Officer.

In December 2021 during the opening of new branches in Dansoman and Spintex, some Ghanaian artists like KiDi, DhopeNation, Mona 4Real, DJ Virusky graced the occasion.

In June 2022, Schardo Mitch and Nana Mitch became ambassadors for the company.

In September 2023, AMG Deuces was also unveiled as a brand ambassador for the company.

In June 2025, Mikki Osei Berko became a brand ambassador for the company. In October 2025, Kweku Smoke performed a theme song for the company during the introduction of the meal combo, the Playman Pack.

== Initiative ==
In August 2023, the company unveiled a project called The LunchTime Initiative which is to visit various workplaces to share lunch time moments with workers. They visited the Ghana National Fire Service and Glovo Ghana in Kumasi.

== Controversy ==
In May 2023, two employees of the company were arrested and jailed for 5-years each for stealing gallons of cooking oil and boxes of chicken wings from the warehouse of the company in Nyankyerenease, near Kumasi in Ghana. Abeiku Santana criticized the CEO over the jail term given to the employees. Richie, a marketer of the company also criticized Abeiku Santana for attacking the CEO of the company. Bullgod also criticized Abeiku Santana for his attack on the CEO.
