= List of Ghanaian musicians =

This is a list of notable past and present musicians in Ghana.

== Afrojazz ==
- Guy Warren
- Rebop Kwaku Baah

== Afropop ==
- KiDi
- Becca
- Fuse ODG
- Jay Ghartey
- Teddy Osei
- Osibisa
- Wendy Shay
- Dobble
- Yaw Ray
- Paa Kwasi

== Afrobeats ==
- Darkovibes
- Mugeez
- KiDi
- Kuami Eugene
- Kelvyn Boy
- Wendy Shay
- Gyakie
- Dobble
- Yaw Ray
- Paa Kwasi
- KOJOBLAK
- OliveTheBoy

== Dancehall ==
- Ebony Reigns
- Iwan
- Kaakie
- Samini
- Shatta Wale
- Stonebwoy

== Gospel ==
- Comfort Annor
- Bernice Ofei
- Bro. Philemon
- Danny Nettey
- Helen Yawson
- Joe Beecham
- Joe Mettle
- Kofi Owusu Dua Anto
- Nayaah
- Nii Okai
- Ohemaa Mercy
- Preachers
- QwameGaby
- Stella Aba Seal
- Tagoe Sisters
- Diana Hamilton
- Joyce Blessing

== Soul/ RnB ==
- Efya
- Cina Soul
- Amaarae
- Akwaboah Jnr

== Highlife ==
- A. B. Crentsil
- Akwaboah Snr
- Alex Konadu
- Amakye Dede
- Obuoba J.A. Adofo
- Ben Brako
- Bisa Kdei
- Paa Kwasi
- C.K. Mann
- Daddy Lumba
- E. T. Mensah
- Ebo Taylor
- K. Frimpong
- King Bruce
- Kojo Antwi
- Kofi B
- Koo Nimo
- Kwabena Kwabena
- Jerry Hansen
- Nana Acheampong
- Anna Nana Ama Dadzie
- Dobble
- Yaw Ray
- Kuami Eugene
- K.K Fosu
- Ofori Amponsah
- Quarme Zaggy
- Dada Hafco

== Hiplife ==
- Amerado
- Ayesem
- Ayigbe Edem
- Ball J
- Bice Osei Kuffour
- Dobble
- Buk Bak
- C-Real
- Castro
- Corp Sayvee
- D-Black
- Dead Peepol
- Efya
- EL
- Eno Barony
- Gasmilla
- Kesse
- M.anifest
- Medikal
- Nero X
- Okyeame Kwame
- Reggie Rockstone
- Ruff n Smooth
- Sarkodie
- Sherifa Gunu
- Strongman
- Sway
- Tinny
- Trigmatic
- Joey B
- Pappy Kojo
- Gurunkz
- R2Bees
- Kofi Kinaata
- Kwesi Arthur
- KiDi
- Kuami Eugene
- K.K Fosu
- Ofori Amponsah

== Ghanaian Drill ==
- Black Sherif
- Kwesi Arthur
- Pappy Kojo
- Yaw Tog

== Reggae ==
- Adam Ro
- Bobo Shanti
- Rascalimu
- Rita Marley
- Rocky Dawuni
- Samini
- Sheriff Ghale
- Stonebwoy
- Fancy Gadam

== Composers/others ==
- Abubakari Lunna
- Ephraim Amu
- Ken Kafui
- Philip Gbeho
