= List of people from Dagbon =

This is a list of prominent people who were born in Dagbon, lived for a significant period in Dagbon or were born to a Dagomba parent or parents.

== Education ==
- Haruna Yakubu
- R. P. Baffour
- Seidu Al-Hassan

== Music ==
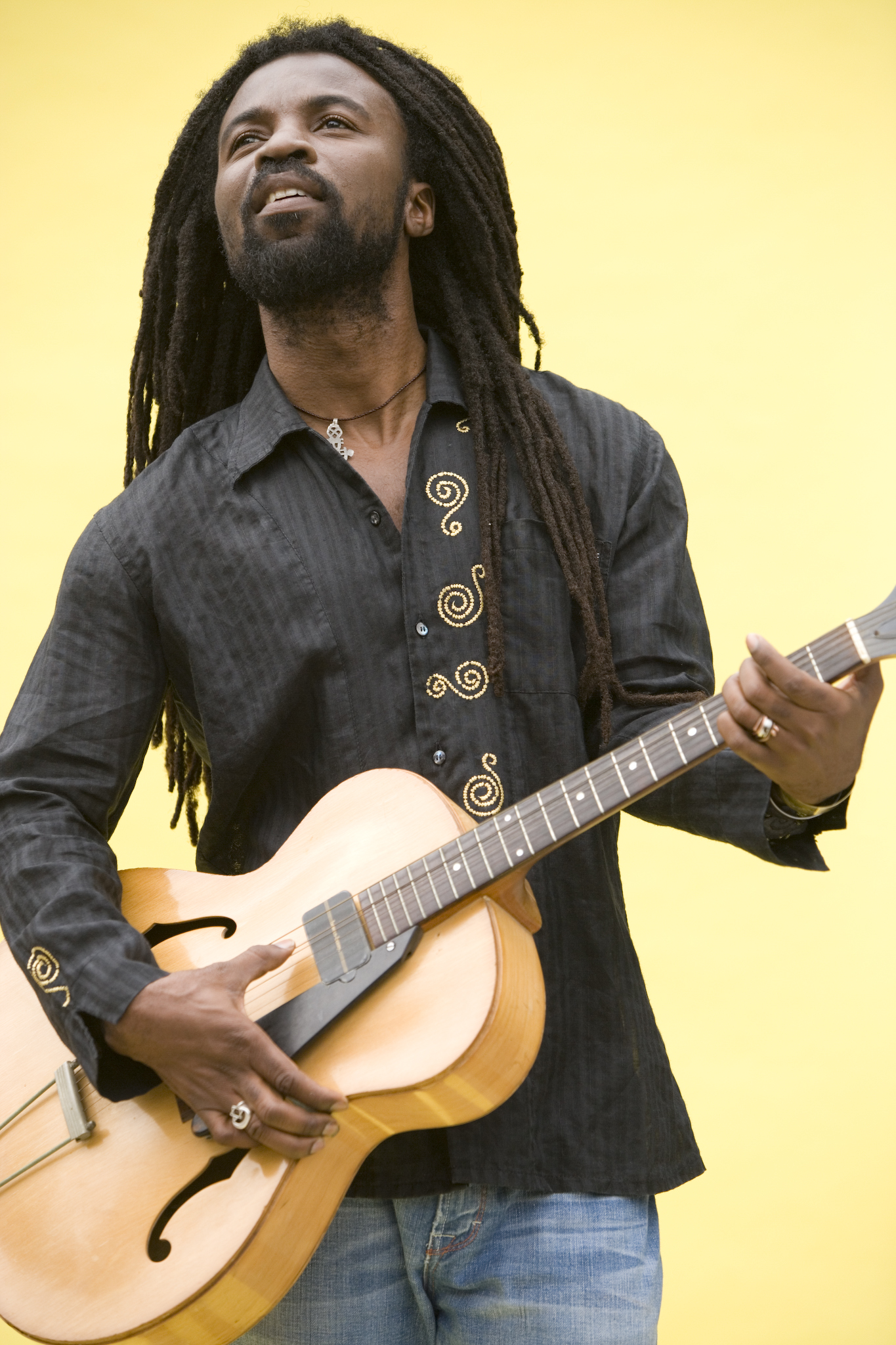
Rocky Dawuni

- Rascalimu
- Rocky Dawuni
- Sidiku Buari
- Sheriff Ghale
- Sherifa Gunu
- Fancy Gadam; afropop, dancehall and reggae musical artiste.
- Abubakari Lunna
- Sherif Abdul Majeed

== Journalism ==
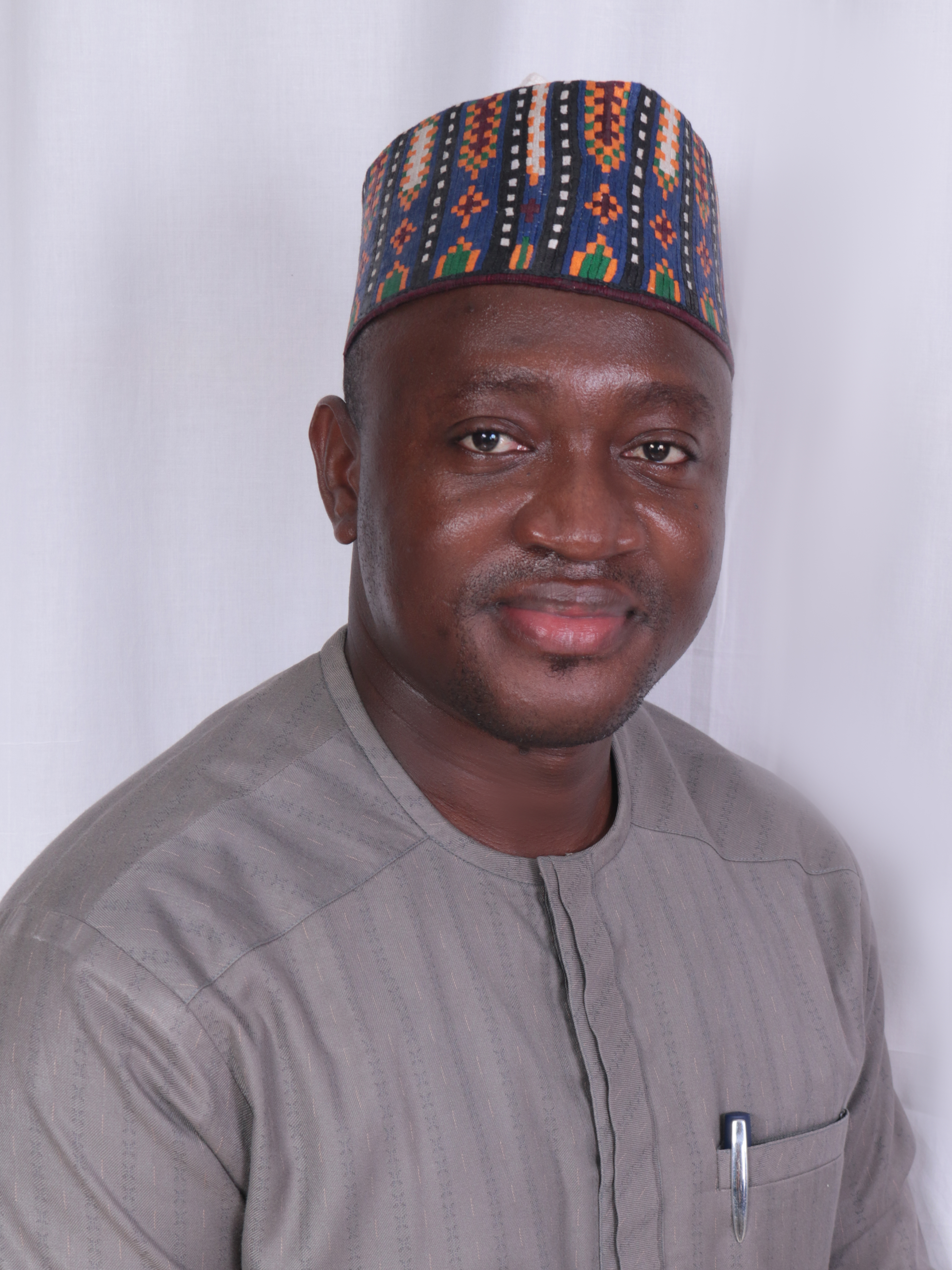
Alhassan Suhuyini

- Alhassan S. Suhuyini
- Mahama Shaibu

== Military & Police ==
- Bawa Andani Yakubu

== Politics ==
- Aliu Mahama
- Imoro Yakubu Kakpagu
- Muntaka Mohammed Mubarak
- Alhaji Muhammad Mumuni
- Ras Mubarak
- Haruna Iddrisu
- Inusah Fuseini
- Alhassan Suhuyini
- Abdul Aziz Fatahiya
- Abdul-Fatawu Alhassan
- Atta Issah
- Inusah fuseini
- Misbahu Mahama Adams
- Seidu Mahama Alidu
- Ibrahim Murtala mohammed

== Religious ==
- Yusuf Soalih Ajura
- Saeed Abubakr Zakaria
- Ibrahim Basha
- Mariam Alhassan Alolo
- Mustapha Baba Bawku

== Sport ==
- Abdul Majeed Waris
- Abukari Damba
- George Alhassan
- Hamza Mohammed
- Mubarak Wakaso
- Salifu Mudasiru
- Sherifatu Sumaila
- Mukarama Abdulai
- Abdul Rahman Baba
- Mohammed Kudus

== Technology ==
- Mohammed-Sani Abdulai, Computer Scientist and Informatics researcher.

== Other ==
- Yakubu II
