= Ibrahim Basha =

Islamic preacher

Islamic scholar Ibrahim Basha Iddris
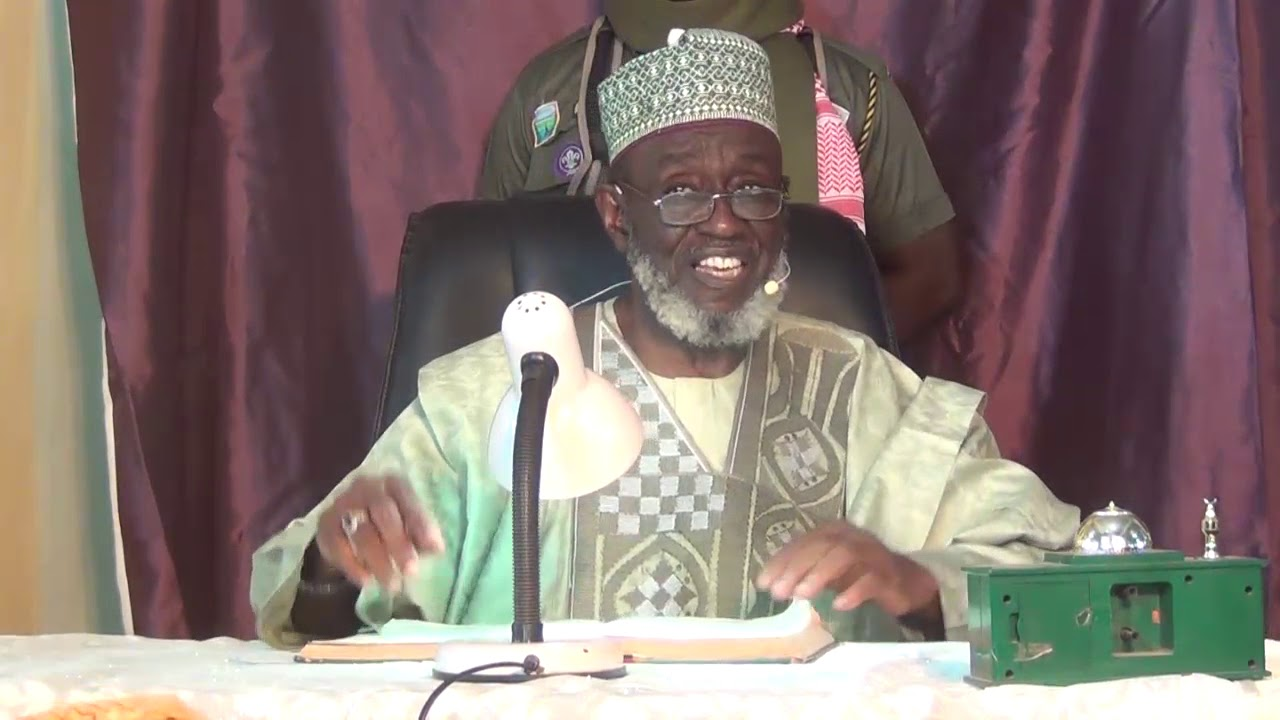
- Title: Sheikh Al-Hajj Afa

Personal life
- Born: Ibrahim; 1928 contested Kumasi
- Region: West Africa
- Other names: Sheikh Doctuur Bayaan, Afa Basha
- Occupation: Islamic Instructor

Religious life
- Religion: Islam
- Denomination: Sunni Islam
- Jurisprudence: Hanafi Maliki Shafi'i Hanbali
- Movement: Salafi

Ibrahim Basha Iddris also called Mallam Basha or Sheikh Bayaan, is a Ghanaian Islamic preacher, and one of the campaigners of the Sunni Islamic movement in Ghana. He founded Nuriyya Islamic Institute in Tamale in 1969 and is the leader of Masjidul Bayaan in Tamale.

He is widely considered to have been the initiator in transforming the traditional madrasas into Anglo-Arabic schooling and the pioneer of the creation of Ghana Islamic Education Unit.

== Biography ==
=== Early life ===
Ibrahim was born in Kumasi but took his initial studies in Takoradi at Khairiyya Islamic School. He was taught by Hajj Shuab, a renowned Dagomba Islamic scholar. Ibrahim was given the nod to teach his colleagues as an advanced student. Later, he moved to Kumasi to study under Sheikh Ahmad Nurideen.

=== Coming to Tamale and Time at Anbariyya Islamic Institute ===
Shiekh Basha occasionally visited his uncle Yusuf Soalih Ajura also known as Afa Ajura in Tamale. However, in the 1950s, he stayed permanently with Afa Ajura in Tamale and started teaching at the Anbariyya Islamic Institute. Notable amongst his students was Sheikh Saeed Abubakr Zakaria who is currently the leader of the Anbariyya Islamic Institute. Basha later left to form his own school.

=== Formation of Nuriyya Islamic Institute ===
In the 1960s, Basha left Anbariyya Islamic Institute. Gow, Olonisakin, & Dijxhoorn (2013) cited the lessening of Afa Ajura's Wahhabi doctrine, difference in interpretation as well as the infusion of secular education as the main cause. Subsequently, he established Madrasat Nuriyya in 1969 now Nuriyya Islamic Institute. Nuriyya Islamic Institute became one of the first Islamic schools to be transformed from teaching only Arabic to Anglo-Arabic.

== Controversies ==
Ibrahim has been alleged as being a Tijaniyyah and a Shi'a. However, he denied those charges. In his own account; he asserted that although he was taught by a scholar who happens to have practiced Tijaniyyah, he never succumbed to its practice that strayed from traditional Sunni. Furthermore, on the issue of being a Shi'a, he claimed that he was a friend to Shi'as but never practiced their movement.

Ibrahim is also alleged to be rival to the Anbariya Sunni Community as he has been severally accused of speaking against them in his sermons.
