= Anna Nana Ama Dadzie =

Ghanaian backing vocalist and composer (born 1979)

Anna Nana Ama Dadzie Nana Ama
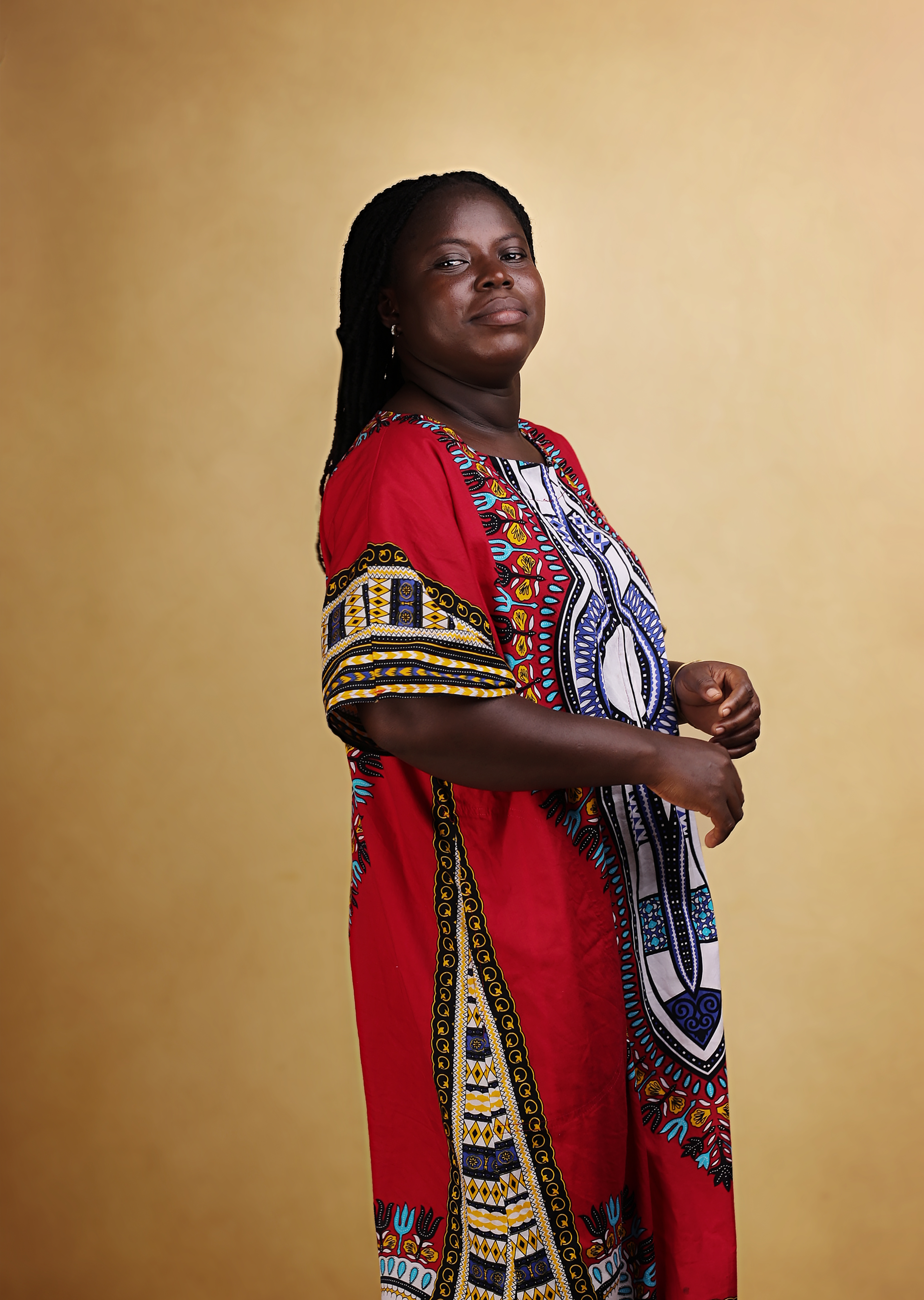

Background information
- Also known as: Nana Ama, Adadzeiwaa
- Born: October 20, 1979 (age 46); Dansoman
- Genres: Hiplife, Highlife
- Occupation: Background vocalist
- Instrument: Voice
- Works: Discovery of Terry Bonchaka
- Years active: 1998-present
- Spouse: Obofour Raphael

Anna Nana Ama Dadzie (born October, 20 1979) and known professionally as Nana Ama or Adadziewaa, is a veteran Ghanaian singer, composer and background vocalist.

== Early life ==
She was born in Dansoman, a suburb of Accra, Ghana. She completed her secondary education at Winneba Secondary School and later attended the National Symphony Orchestra in Ghana to continue her music studies.

== Personal life ==
Nana Ama is married to Obofour Raphel.

== Career ==
Anna began her career in 1999, after receiving vocal mentorship from Nesbit Hanson Addy. This led her to working initially on radio jingles and voice overs before her transition into her role as a full-time backing vocalist for producers like Hammer of The Last Two, Jay Q, Zapp Mallet and Morris Babyface.

She is credited for making the jingle for Top Radio in 1999

She performed as a backup singer during Stevie Wonder's concert in Accra in 2004. In 2006, she featured in Grace Ashy's theme song for the Ghana Black Stars World Cup Campaign in Germany.

== Notable backing vocal credits ==
Nana Ama's contributions are embedded into the golden era of Ghanaian hiplife and highlife music where she has contributed to more than 100 songs.

Year	Primary Artist	Song Title/Album	Genre	Significance
2002	Lord Kenya	Medo (ft Nana Ama and Swazy B)	Hiplife	Won Song of The Year at Ghana Music Awards (2001)
2002	Terry Bonchaka	Pulele	Hiplife	
2003	Buk Bak	Klu Brofo	Hiplife	Song of the Year at Ghana Music Awards 2003
2008	Blakk Rasta	Barack Obama	Reggae	
2008	Madfish	Yahooya (feat Batman and Nana Ama)	Hiplife	
2020	SSUE & Pat Thomas	Bombaya Fire	Reggae	

In October 2020, she launched her solo career and released her album, "The Lost Files of Nana Ama" in 2022.

As part of her advocacy, she acts as the Public Relations Officer for the Ghana Background Vocalists Association, (GHABVA).

== Impact and advocacy ==
Despite her monumental contribution to music in Ghana, Nana Ama has often highlighted the challenges faced by backing vocalists particularly the lack of fair compensation. She often hinted that the absence of royalty structures in Ghana hindered proper credits and the collection of royalties and publishing rights. She became a vocal advocate for the recognition and professionalization of session musicians and led the way for better conditions for her contemporaries. She has also advocated for the recognition of backing vocalists and other composers in the Ghana Music Awards.

== Recognition ==
In 2021, the 3Music Women's Brunch was honoured with a Lifetime Achievement Award for her contributions to the industry.
