= Batakari Festival =

Cultural event in Ghana

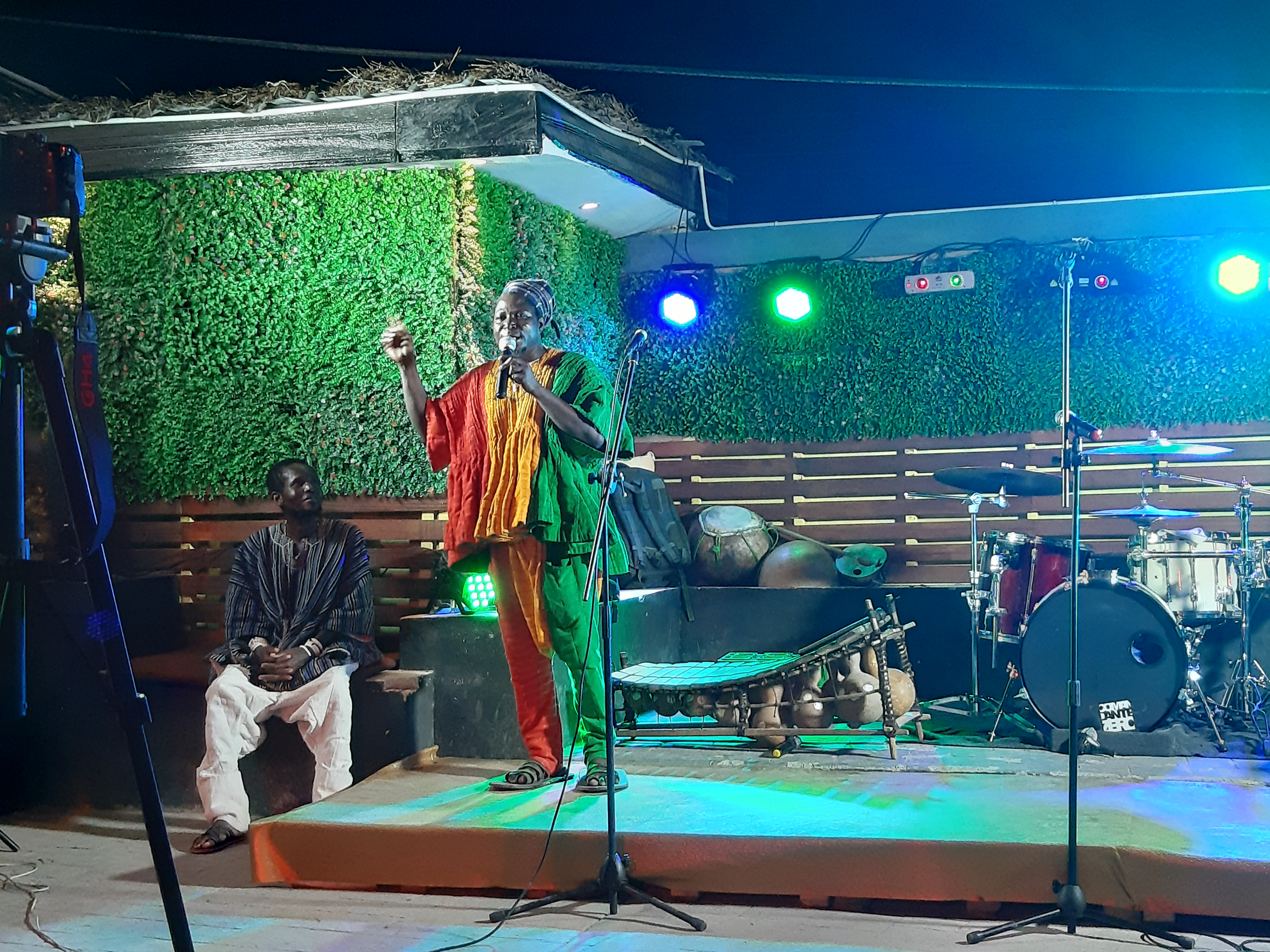
- King Ayisoba at the 2020 edition of the Batakari festival at Kona bar
- Status: Active
- Frequency: Annually
- Country: Ghana
- Years active: 13
- Founder: King Ayisoba

The Batakari Festival is a cultural event organised by King Ayisoba to showcase Batakari, a traditional handmade Ghanaian smock from the Upper East Region of Ghana. The inaugural event was held in 2013 and the festival has since become an annual event in Ghana.

== Background and Program ==
King Ayisoba developed this idea due to his love for Ghanaian Northern fashion. He said people in the past associated the locally woven clothe, Batakari with juju and occultism and the concert was his move to change people's stance and address the misconception about wearing Fugu or Batakari. He believed that propagating the wearing of the fashion through programs like his will consequently create jobs for people thereby reducing the rate of unemployment and also serve as a source income for the youth in Northern Ghana.

The festival is held on an annual basis in specific cities in Ghana at specific dates. In Accra, various venues have hosted the event, some of which include; the National Theater and Alliance Française. Guest artistes are invited to perform and showcase their Batakari attires, however, the main performers are King Ayisoba and his team of Kologo players. Some guest artistes that have been invited to grace the occasion include; Wiyaala, Wanlov the Kubolor, Kwaw Kese, Yaa Pono, Atongo Zimba and Zea from the Netherlands.

== See also ==
- Batakari day
- Ghanaian smock
