= Sorakiss =

Ghanaian musician

- Also known as: Sorakiss
- Born: Barbara Martha Psorakis
- Genres: Afrobeats
- Years active: 2018 – present

Barbara Martha Psorakis (born 11 April 1996), known by the stage name Sorakiss, is a Ghanaian singer and actress. In 2017 she was nominated for the Best New Act at Ghana Entertainment Awards (USA) which was won by Medikal.

== Education and early life ==
Sorakiss was born in Tema to Mr George Psorakis and Madam Elizabeth Frimpong. She enrolled in Ola Senior High School for her secondary school education but ended up moving to Datus International School where she completed. She continued to pursue Screenwriting and Directing at the National Film and Television Institute (NAFTI).

== Career ==
For Sorakiss, her career in music began whiles in secondary school. She wrote her first song titled "No Pain No gain" which gave her the chance to perform at Ghana national theatre. She also had two singles and two movies “Hell Bound” & “Teens Life” to her credit.

Her next single, 'My Honey’, which featured Akwaboah Jnr gave her the chance to perform at various stages including the 4syte TV Music Video Awards and Ghana DJ Awards She joined 4stye TV as a TV presenter in 2014.
