= KODA (singer) =

Ghanaian gospel musician (1978–2024)

- Born: Augustine Kofi Owusu Dua Anto; 15 December 1978; Sekondi-Takoradi, Ghana
- Died: 21 April 2024 (aged 45)
- Genres: Gospel; urban contemporary gospel
- Occupations: Singer; songwriter; music producer
- Instruments: Vocals; piano; keyboards; guitar
- Years active: 2010–2024
- Label: Elks Musik

Kofi Owusu Dua Anto (15 December 1978 – 21 April 2024), known mononymously as KODA, was a Ghanaian gospel singer, songwriter, record producer, and multi-instrumentalist from Takoradi.

== Early life and education ==
KODA fell in love with musical instruments at a tender age. His mother enrolled him in a music class at the age of 10 where he developed his skills to play the guitar. He went to the Kwame Nkrumah University of Science and Technology (KNUST) where he became the mass choir director of the university.

KODA was also the music director and instrumentalist of the "Music Wing of Baptist Students Union", "KNUST's Simply Jazz Crew", "God's Instruments" and a leading member of "Da Project" which was a legendary Ghanaian contemporary gospel group then. After tertiary education, he co-wrote, mixed, mastered and produced the exceptional album, Awurade Ei for KNUST's "God's Instruments" at KODED studios, Takoradi, Ghana. The album received massive recognition in the country. It had great hits such as "Awurade Ei" ("Se Woma Wonsa Soa"), "Tumi" and "Onyame" Ye D'awase".

== Music career ==
KODA also worked on Nii Okai's Moko Be and Gye W'ayeyi albums, gaining him prominence as a producer. KODA worked with many gospel artists in Ghana and internationally, including Nii Okai, Pastor Joseph Gyebi, Danny Nettey, Pastor Joe Beecham, Daughters of Glorious Jesus, Joyful Way Inc., Pastor Helen Yawson, Yaw Osei-Owusu, "Ike Nanor", Eugene Zuta, Jesse Jenkins, Diana Hamilton and Calvis Hammond. The Anointed is a music group formed by KODA and his friends based in Takoradi. The group has supported many gospel ministries in the country and overseas.

KODA has made four vocal and two gospel jazz albums, including Waye Wie, which had hits including "Waye Wie", "Zion's song", "Poma" and "Amen", and Nyame Beye.

His third album Black & White including the tracks "Guide Me O", "Nkwa Abodoo" and "Obiara Nte Se Wo", and the controversial "Nsem Pii". In 2016, he released an album OXYGEN, featuring the songs "Adooso", "Yaa Pae" and "Chimo".

In 2021, KODA released Keteke, his 6th vocal album. As a music tutor, he released two instructional DVDs on bass and lead guitar and three live DVDs of his major concerts; KODA live (2008), Black and White live (2013) and Oxygen Live (2016).

== Personal life and death ==
KODA was married to fellow musician Ewurama Dua Anto and together they had two sons and a daughter.

KODA died in the early hours of 21 April 2024, aged 45, after battling kidney disease for an extended period.

== Discography ==
=== Albums ===
Title	Album details
Nyame Beye (God'll do it)	Release year: 2006
Waye Wie (He's done it)	Release year: 2008
My Passion - Christian Jazz	Release year: 2008
Joy - Christian Jazz	Release year: 2008
Black & White	Release year: 2013
Oxygen	Release year: 2016
Hosanna	Release year: 2018
Keteke	Release year: 2021

=== Major singles ===
- Nkwaa Abodoo featuring Nacy
- Nsem Pii
- Adooso

== Awards and nominations ==
Year	Event	Prize	Recipient / Nominated work	Result	Ref
2015	Ghana Music Awards	Record of the Year	Nkwaa Abodoo	Won	
2014	Africa Gospel Music Awards	Producer of the Year	Himself	Won	
2013	Christian Community Music Awards	Song with a Cause	Nsem Pii	Won	
2012	Africa Gospel Music Awards	Producer of the Year	Himself	Nominated	
