= Becca (Ghanaian singer) =

Ghanaian singer (born 1984)

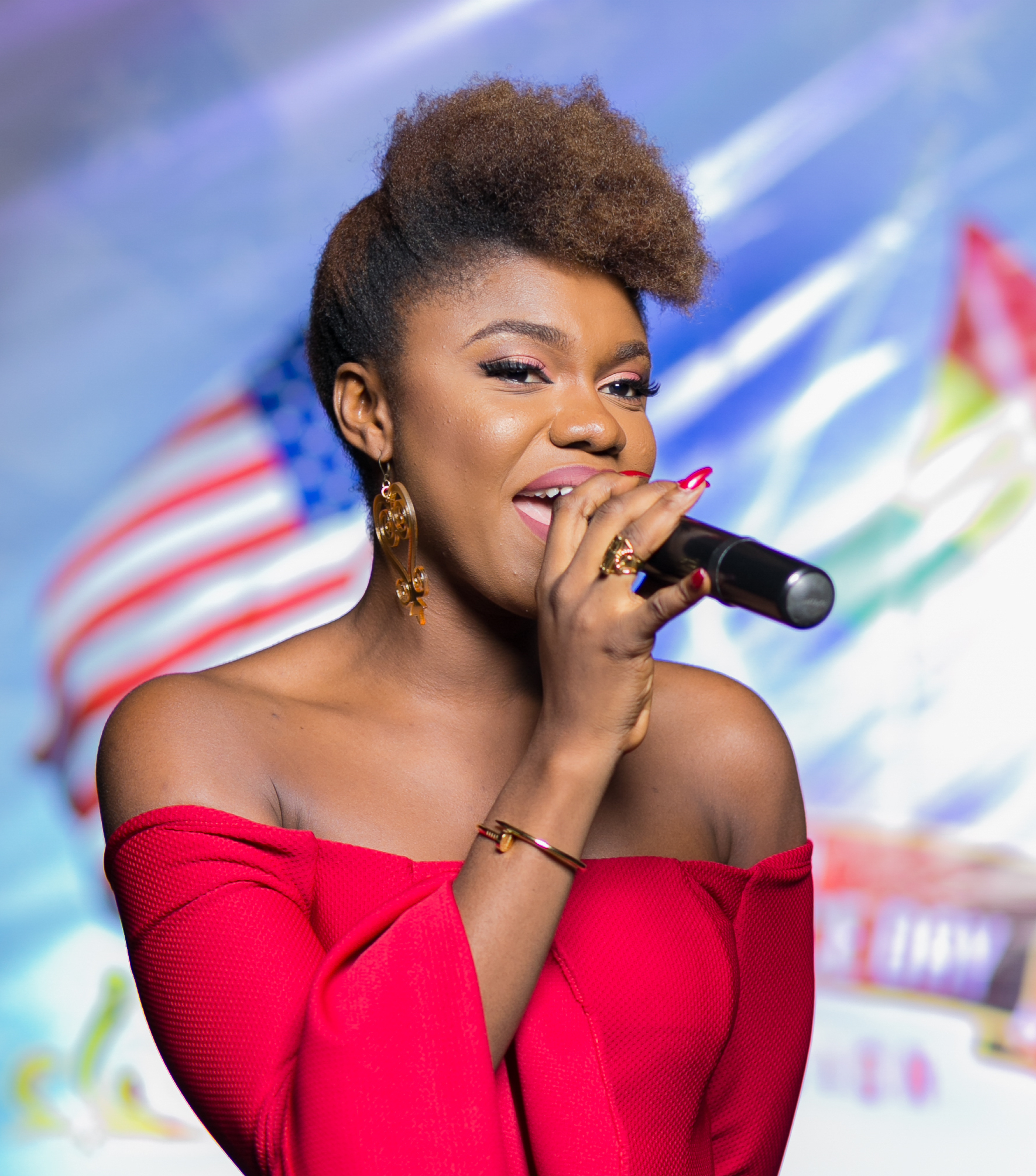
- Becca performing at the U.S Embassy in Accra during the celebration of America's 240th Birthday

Background information
- Born: Rebecca Akosua Acheampomaa Acheampong; 15 August 1984 (age 42); Kumasi, Ghana
- Origin: Accra, Ghana
- Genres: Afropop; R&B; highlife
- Occupations: Singer; songwriter; actress
- Instrument: Vocals
- Years active: 2007—present
- Label: Zylofon Media

Rebecca Akosua Acheampomaa Acheampong (born 15 August 1984), known mononymously as Becca, is a Ghanaian singer, songwriter and actress. She first gained recognition as a contestant on the second season of Mentor, an annual singing competition launched by TV3 Ghana. Her debut studio album, Sugar, was released in 2007. It earned her five nominations at the 2008 Ghana Music Awards, including Record of the Year for "You Lied to Me". On 16 May 2013, Becca released her second studio album Time 4 Me, which features collaborations with 2face Idibia, MI, King Ayisoba, Trigmatic, Jay Storm and Akwaboah. The album was certified two-times platinum in Ghana.

Becca's accolades include one Kora Award, one National Youth Achievers Award, four Ghana Music Awards, and three 4Syte TV Music Video Awards. In 2013, she headlined the annual Girl Talk concert, which started in 2011. Becca was ranked 94 on E.tv Ghana's 2013 list of the 100 most influential people in Ghana. In March 2021, 3Music Network included her on its list of the Top 30 Most Influential Women in Music. Becca's third studio album, Unveiling, was released on 18 August 2017.

== Life and music career ==
Rebecca Akosua Acheampomaa Acheampong was born in Kumasi, Ghana. She is the first girl and fifth born of nine children. Becca was quite active in church and school activities during her childhood. She attended Morning Star and Wesley Girls' High School, and took an interest in showcasing her vocal dexterity at talent shows held at the latter school. She graduated from Croydon College and became a child care and education worker. Becca relocated to Ghana and signed with Kiki Banson's EKB Records. She studied at the Ghana Institute of Management and Public Administration. Becca obtained a master's degree in brands and communication management from the University of Professional Studies (UPSA), and was made valedictorian.

=== 2007–2012: Sugar, Time 4 Me, and performances ===
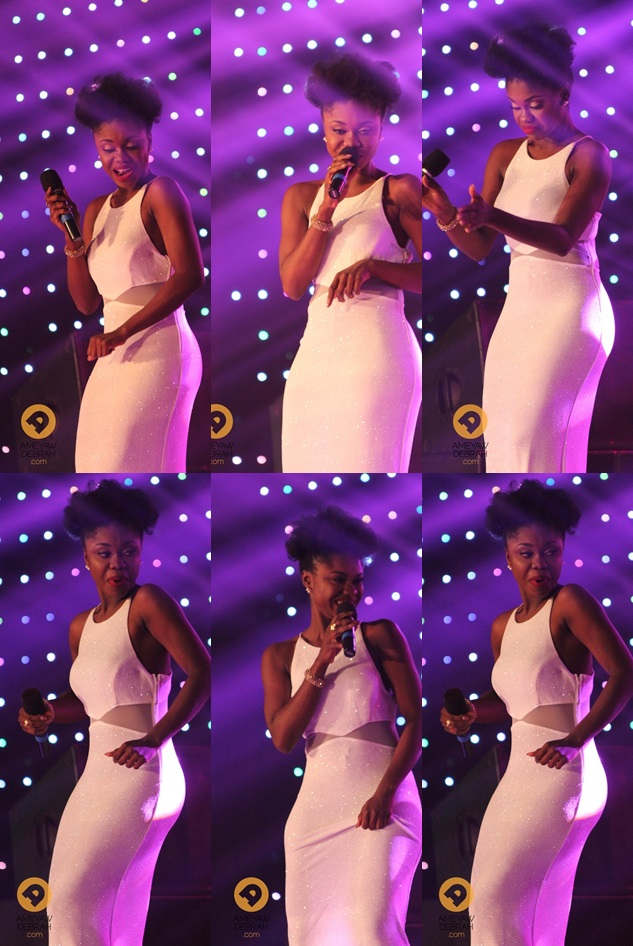
Becca performing at the Ovation Red Carol charity ball in December 2013

Becca started working on her debut studio album, Sugar, in 2007. The album comprises twelve songs and was recorded in English and Twi; it features guest artists such as Hugh Masekela and Kwabena Kwabena. The album's release was preceded by the single "You Lied to Me", which features vocals by Kwabena Kwabena. The accompanying music video for the song was filmed in Ghana. On 13 November 2007, Becca launched the album in Ghana and later promoted it in South Africa. Becca's second studio album, Time 4 Me, was released on 16 May 2013. She describes the album as a musical journey inspired by her thoughts, emotions and beliefs.

Time 4 Me comprises twenty songs and features guest vocals by 2face Idibia, M.I, King Ayisoba, Trigmatic, Jay Storm, and Akwaboah. It was supported by the singles "Forever", "Push", "Bad Man Bad Girl", "No Away" and "Follow the Leader". Ten thousand copies of the album were given to fans who bought the Thursday edition of Graphic Showbiz newspaper. Time 4 Me was certified two-times platinum in Ghana. Becca went on a nationwide campus tour to promote the album. Her 2011 single "Africa Woman", a melodic ode to the strength and character of African women, appeared as a bonus on the album. The music video for "African Woman", which was filmed in Ghana by Samad Davis, starts with a quote and transitions into landscape scenes of Becca.

In 2011, Becca released "Forever" and "Push" as the album's first two singles. "Push" features guest vocals by King Ayisoba and Trigmatic. The music video for "Push" was uploaded to YouTube on 17 May 2011, and features cameo appearances from John Dumelo, Yvonne Okoro and Yvonne Nelson. In February 2012, Becca released the album's third single "Bad Man Bad Girl", which features vocals by 2face Idibia and was recorded in the summer of 2011. The song's music video was filmed in Accra and other parts of Ghana. The M.I-assisted track "No Away" was released on 22 June 2012, as the album's fourth single. The song was recorded in Ghana and Nigeria and mixed in South Africa. The music video for "No Away" was recorded in South Africa and uploaded to YouTube on 12 August 2012. EKB Records and the liquor company Kasapreko Company Limited invested $50,000 in the video shoot, making it one of the most costly videos ever released by a Ghanaian musician. The video was unveiled during a ceremony at the XL Club in Accra.

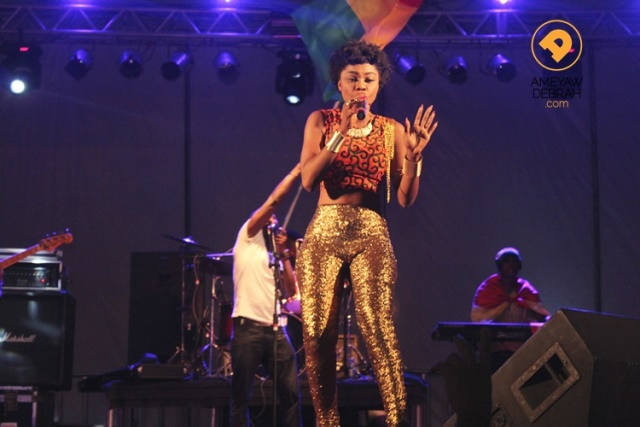
Becca performing at the Meet Ghana hub in Natal during the 2014 FIFA World Cup.

=== 2013–present: "Follow the Leader", "Move", and Unveiling ===
On 17 June 2013, Becca released the album's fifth single "Follow the Leader". On 25 June 2013, EKB Records released the music video for her song "Time 4 Me", which was filmed in Yokohama and Tokyo. Becca performed at the finale of MTN's Heroes of Change television series; the event was held at the Accra International Conference Centre. On 26 July 2013, she launched Time 4 Me and performed with recording engineer Kwame Yeboah that same day. On 20 December 2013, she headlined the third edition of the Girl Talk concert, which occurred at the National Theatre of Ghana.

On 12 April 2014, Becca released the single "Move", which features vocals by South African group Uhuru and debuted on Bola Ray's Drive Time show on Joy FM. The song was produced by Kaywa and written by Becca and Kiki Banson. The music video for "Move" was uploaded to YouTube on 1 May 2014, and features cameo appearances from Yvonne Chaka Chaka and Hugh Masekela. In a review for the website Flex Ghana, Kwame Dadzie said the song's rhythm is a replica of "Khona". On 24 March 2014, AllSports Ghana reported that Becca would perform before the kickoff of Ghana Premier League matches to promote the league.

Becca's third studio album, Unveiling, was released on 18 August 2017. It comprises a total of thirteen tracks, including three bonus tracks. The album features collaborations with Patoranking, Stonebwoy, Ice Prince, Bisa Kdei, Mr Eazi, Kofi Kinaata, and Joyce Blessing. Zylofon Music released Unveiling, which came out four years after Time 4 Me. On the record, Becca embraces Afropop music and expanded her artistry. The album was promoted in Lagos, Johannesburg, London, and New York.

== Artistry, humanitarian work, and endorsements ==
Becca's upbringing and surroundings influenced her musical and fashion style. She has established a rescue organization, which raises funds to help children affected by HIV/AIDS in Ghana. In 2014, she became a Goodwill ambassador for UNAIDS. On 1 September 2009, GLO Mobile Ghana unveiled her as one of its brand ambassadors. Moreover, the Ministry of Youth and Sports made her one of Ghana's official ambassadors at the 2014 FIFA World Cup.

== Gender discrimination ==
Becca was scheduled to sing Ghana's national anthem at the Baba Yara Stadium during the country's World Cup qualifier match against Zambia in September 2013. Unfortunately for her, she did not perform due to a directive by authorities in charge of the match. Becca expressed her dissatisfaction while speaking at the UN Cultural Night, which took place at the Alliance Française in Accra. A spokesperson for the Ghana Football Association told Graphic Showbiz they didn't know arrangements had been made for Becca to sing.

== Personal life ==
Becca is married to Nigerian entrepreneur and artist manager Oluwatobi Sanni Daniel; the couple's wedding was held in Accra on 18 August 2018. Becca has a daughter.

=== Relationship controversy ===
Becca was originally signed to EKB Records, which was owned by Kiki Banson, who also served as her manager. Banson's contentious divorce from his wife was centered around Becca. Banson allegedly divorced his wife in order to marry Becca. Becca's father reportedly disowned her because of her intentions to wed her manager.

== Discography ==
Studio albums

- Sugar (2007)
- Time 4 Me (2013)
- Unveiling (2017)

== Awards and nominations ==
Year	Event	Prize	Recipient	Result	Ref
2017	2017 Ghana Music Awards UK	Highlife Artiste of the Year	Herself	Nominated	
2014	City People Entertainment Awards	Musician of the Year (Female)	Herself	Nominated	
2013	4Syte TV Music Video Awards	Best Female Video	"Time for Me"	Nominated	
2013	City People Entertainment Awards	Musician of the Year (Female)	Herself	Nominated	
2012	4Syte TV Music Video Awards	Best Female Video	"No Away" (featuring MI)	Won	
2012	4Syte TV Music Video Awards	Best Photography Video	"No Away" (featuring MI)	Nominated	
2012	4Syte TV Music Video Awards	Best Collaboration Video	"No Away" (featuring MI)	Nominated	
2012	4Syte TV Music Video Awards	Overall Best Video	"No Away" (featuring MI)	Nominated	
2012	Ghana Music Awards	Artiste of the Year	Herself	Nominated	
2012	Ghana Music Awards	Afro-Pop Song of the Year	"African Woman"	Nominated	
2012	Ghana Music Awards	Best Music Video of The Year	"African Woman"	Won	
2012	Ghana Music Awards	Best Female Vocal Artiste	Herself	Nominated	
2012	National Youth Achievers Awards	Music	Herself	Won	
2011	4Syte TV Music Video Awards	Best Photography Video	"African Woman"	Nominated	
2011	4Syte TV Music Video Awards	Best Directed Video	"African Woman"	Nominated	
2011	4Syte TV Music Video Awards	Best Storyline Video	"African Woman"	Nominated	
2011	4Syte TV Music Video Awards	Overall Best Video	"African Woman"	Won	
2011	4Syte TV Music Video Awards	Best Collaboration Video	"Push" (featuring King Ayisoba & Trigmatic)	Nominated	
2011	4Syte TV Music Video Awards	Best Female Video	"Push" (featuring King Ayisoba & Trigmatic)	Won	
2011	City People Entertainment Awards	Ghana Female Musician of the Year	Herself	Nominated	
2010	4Syte TV Music Video Awards	Best Hi-Life Video	"Daa Ke Daa"	Nominated	
2010	4Syte TV Music Video Awards	Best Storyline Video	"Daa Ke Daa"	Nominated	
2010	4Syte TV Music Video Awards	Best Female Video	"Daa Ke Daa"	Nominated	
2010	4Syte TV Music Video Awards	Best African Act Video	"Daa Ke Daa"	Nominated	
2010	Ghana Music Awards	Highlife Song of the Year	"Daa Ke Daa"	Nominated	
2010	Ghana Music Awards	Record of the Year	"Daa Ke Daa"	Won	
2010	Ghana Music Awards	Best Female Vocal Performance	Herself	Won	
2010	Ghana Music Awards	Artist of the Year	Herself	Nominated	
2010	Kora Awards	Best African Prospect Award	Herself	Won	
2008	Ghana Music Awards	Artiste of the Year	Herself	Nominated	
2008	Ghana Music Awards	Discovery of the Year	Herself	Nominated	
2008	Ghana Music Awards	Best Female Vocal Performance	Herself	Nominated	
2008	Ghana Music Awards	Pop Song of the Year	"You Lied to Me" (featuring Kwabena Kwabena)	Nominated	
2008	Ghana Music Awards	Best Collaboration of the Year	"You Lied to Me" (featuring Kwabena Kwabena)	Nominated	
2008	Ghana Music Awards	Record of the Year	Sugar	Won	
2008	Kora Awards (Note: The 2008 Kora Awards took place on 11 April 2009. It was postponed to improve its delivery.)	Best Artist or Group Hope	Herself	Nominated	
2008	Kora Awards	Best Artist or Group of West Africa	Herself	Nominated	

== See also ==
- List of Ghanaian musicians
- List of Ghanaians
