= Black Prophet =

Ghanaian reggae artist

- Birth name: Kenneth Zonto Wilberforce
- Also known as: Black Prophet
- Born: April 3, 1977 (age 47); Accra, Ghana, Ghana
- Origin: Accra, Ghana
- Genres: Reggae, Roots Reggae
- Years active: 1998–present

Black Prophet, born Kenneth Wilberforce Zonto Bossman on 3 April 1977 in Accra, Ghana, is a Ghanaian reggae music composer and a member of the Rastafari movement.

== Career ==
Bossman appeared at a young age with the Ola Williams band, he released his debut solo album No Pain No Gain in February 1998 with his backing band, the Thunder Strike. It was not until the release of Legal Stranger in 2003 that Prophet gained national spotlight. In 2007, Prophet's "Doubting me" was named best reggae song of the year at the Ghana National Music Awards. The release of his second album attracted international attention as well. For the first time in his career, he visited the Netherlands and Sweden where he played at various festivals, including Oland Roots, Irie Vibes Festival and Afrika Festival Delft. He has worked and collaborated with various international reggae artists including Rita Marley, Pliers, Don Carlos, Yellowman, Steel Pulse, Lucky Dube, Alpha Blondy, Buju Banton and Dean Fraser, who produced a song on his latest album Tribulations in December 2010. The album features a duet with reggae icon Capleton.

== Personal ==
Black Prophet is a vegan. He is also a member of the Twelve Tribes of Israel Rastafari Movement.

== See also ==
- Sheriff Ghale
