= Sherifa Gunu =

Ghanaian musician

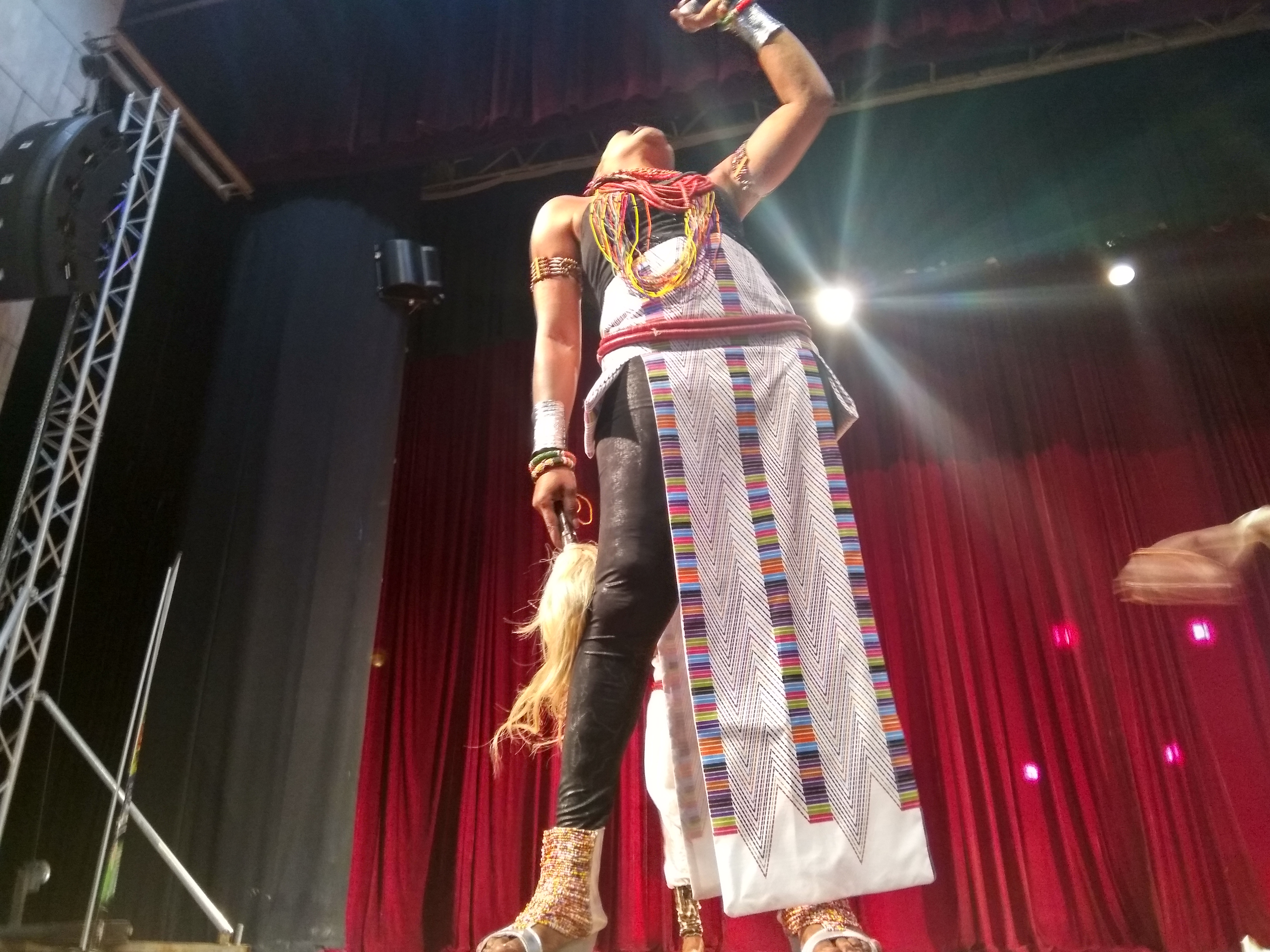
- Gunu in 2012

Background information
- Born: Sherifatu
- Origin: Savelugu, Ghana
- Genres: Soul, Africana
- Occupations: Singer-songwriter, dancer
- Instrument: Vocals

Sherifa Gunu is a Ghanaian singer and dancer whose work combines soul with traditional Ghanaian styles, which she describes as Africana. She was born into a royal family of the Kingdom of Dagbon in the Northern Region of Ghana, and took part in regional and national dance competitions before turning to music.

== Early life ==
Gunu was born in Savelugu, in the Kingdom of Dagbon in the Northern Region of Ghana, into a royal family. She left school at an early stage and later competed in both regional and national dance competitions.

== Musical career ==
Gunu became the Northern Regional dance champion and was first runner-up in the 1998 Embassy Pleasure, a national dance championship. She later took part in the 2003 Hiplife dance championship alongside King Ayisoba and Terry Bonchaka, finishing as first runner-up to Bonchaka, which led to a series of collaborations between the three. As many would describe her, Sherifa Gunu is a crowd shaker when it comes to singing and dancing.

In 2017, she released a single titled "Salamatu", which is also the title of one of her albums. She said the title was chosen to draw attention to the distinctiveness of some African names.

She has sung backing vocals for Kojo Antwi, Amakye Dede, Daddy Lumba, Nana Acheampong and Sarkodie.

== Performances ==
Gunu performed at the National Theatre for the first edition of Zongofest, a show honouring Zongo personalities and showcasing new talent. She also performed at a live band show at the Golden Tulip hotel in Accra during the launch of the networking event Corporate Wednesday.

== Awards and nominations ==
At the 2013 Vodafone Ghana Music Awards, held at the Alisa Hotel in Accra, Gunu won Traditional Artiste of the Year.

She was first runner-up at the 1998 National Dance Championship (the Embassy Pleasure) and at the 2003 Hiplife Dance Championship.

== Discography ==
=== Studio albums ===
- Dagbon (Tamale)
- Akwaaba Wo Africa
- African Woman
- Kuuku

== Personal life ==
Gunu is a Muslim and has two children.
