= Dansoman =

Coordinates: 5°33′N 0°16′W

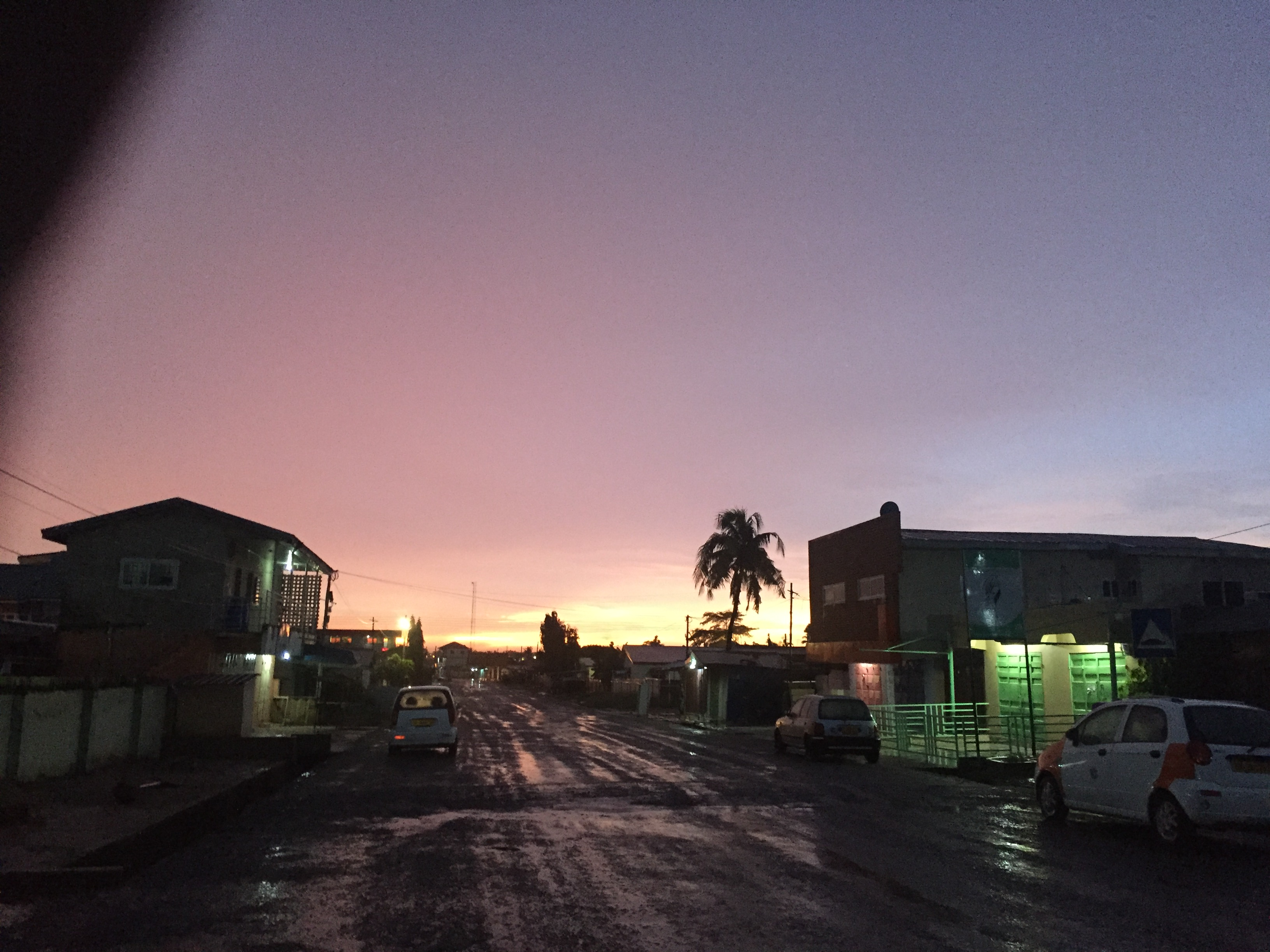
- Dansoman
- Nickname: DC
- Interactive map of Dansoman
- Country: Ghana
- Region: Greater Accra Region

Dansoman is a suburban town in the Greater Accra Region of Ghana, It is known as one of the largest estates in West Africa.

== History ==
Dansoman was founded by the late Nii Kojo Danso I in the late 1960s, and was named after him soon after (with "man" meaning town in Ga). When it was built, Dansoman was the largest planned urban settlement in the ECOWAS region.

Traditionally, the Dansoman stool is under the Ngleshie Alata Traditional Council located in Jamestown of the capital city, Accra.

Dansoman has played a pivotal role in the creative arts industry. The dansoman brand has been home to a lot of creatives both past and present, ranging from renowned actors, musicians and politicians. For example, Appietus, M3nsa, Terry Bonchaka, Samini, DJ Black, Fred Amugi, Alui Mahama and many more.

== Sport ==
Liberty Professionals, the local professional football club, play at the Carl Reindorf Park Stadium.

== Schools ==
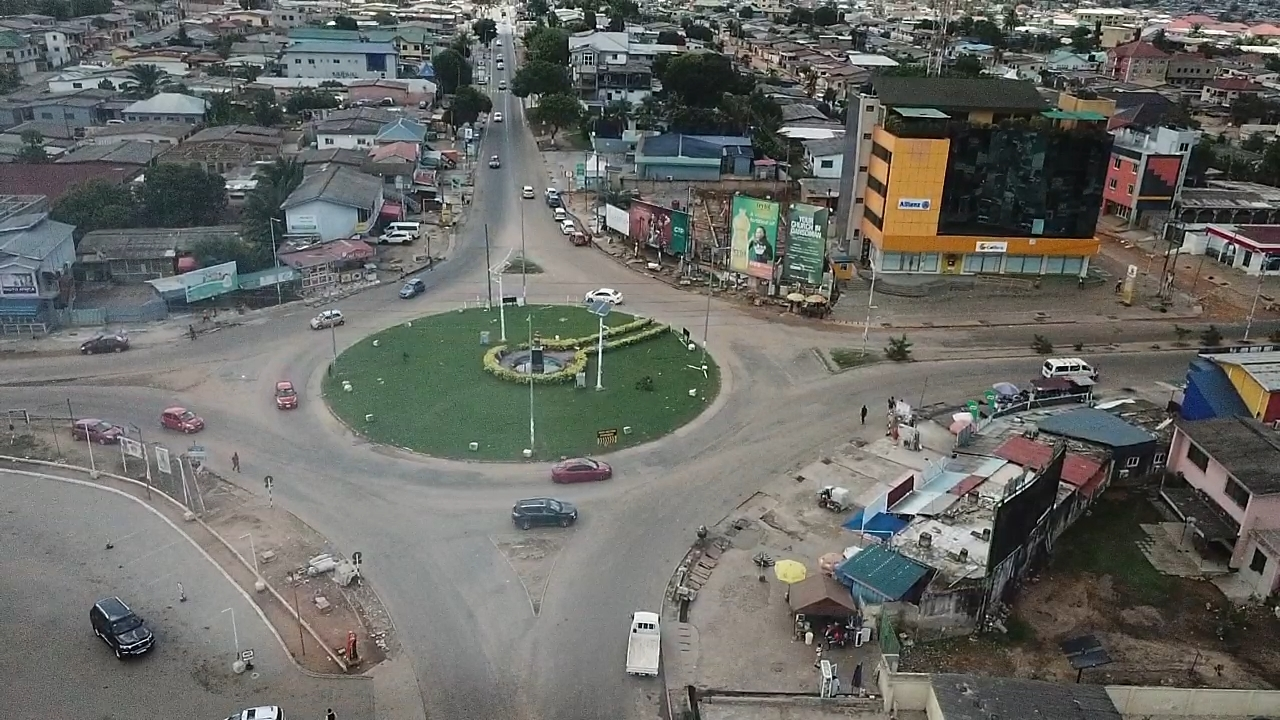
Dansoman Roundabout

Dansoman has several schools, including top schools such as May’s Educational Centre, Dayspring Montessori International School, Ebenezer Senior High, St. Margaret Mary Senior High and Wesley Grammar Senior High. Its junior high schools are Ave Maria School, Christian Home School, St. Bernadette Soubirious Primary School, St Martin de Porres School, Mt. Olivet Methodist Academy, Alpha Beta Christian College, and New Century Career Training Institute (NCCTI/NVTI).

=== Senior high schools ===
- Alpha Beta Christian College
- Dansoman Secondary School
- Ebenezer Senior High School
- Rising Star Senior High School
- Seven Great Princes Senior High School
- St. Margret Mary Senior High School
- Wesley Grammar School
- Dansoman Technical School
- NCCTI~NVTI: New Century Career Training Institute
- His Majesty Academy (Senior High School)

=== Junior high schools ===
- Christian Home School
- May’s Day Care & Educational Centre
- Debest Academy
- Dansoman Baptist Academy
- Top Class Education Center
- Datus Complex School
- Ted Academy
- Lospat School Complex
- Riis Memorial School
- Alpha Beta Christian College
- Kids Alliance Education Centre
- St. Martins De Porres
- Mother Mary's School
- St. Anthony's School
- St. Bernadette Soubirous School
- Step-By-Step Montessori School
- Regand international school
- Emmanuel Presbyterian Preparatory School
- St. Jude's School
- Ave Maria School
- Dansoman '1' Junior High School
- Dansoman '2' Junior High School
- Dansoman '3' Junior High School
- Dansoman '4' Junior High School
- Christian Home School
- Seven Great Princes Academy
- St. Anthony's Preparatory School
- St. Martin de Porres School"
- Star of The Sea School
- Mount Olivet Methodist Academy
- Oddarene School
- Kiddie Class Education Centre
- Most Holy Heart School
- Goodwill Preparatory School
- Bishop John Daly Anglican School
- Gbegbeyise Junior High School
- Riches of Glory Academy
- Royal Standard Learning Centre
- Christ Ambassadors School of Excellence
- Young Christian Int'l School
- Dayspring Montessori International School
- St. Augustine Anglican Basic School

== Churches ==
- Soka Gakkai International - Ghana, Dansoman.
- Winners' Chapel International, Dansoman
- Word Alive Chapel - Opposite Osofo Dadzie
- Royalhouse Chapel International (Datus School Complex)
- Bethel Baptist Church, Dansoman
- Bethesda Methodist Church, Mpoasei
- The Church of Pentecost Ebenezer Down Assembly
- Ebenezer Methodist Church, Dansoman
- Apostolic Church Ghana, Dansoman
- Emmanuel Presbyterian Church
- Assemblies of God Ghana - Exhibition
- Musama Disco Christo Church (M.D.C.C.)
- St. Augustine Anglican Church
- Star of The Sea Catholic Church
- Great Commission Church International(G.C.C.I)
- Action Chapel International
- Mt. Olivet Methodist Church
- St. Margaret-Mary Catholic Church
- The Church of Pentecost Gbegbeyise
- "Kingdom Covenant Ministres International, Dansoman
- Bread of Life Methodist Church
- Reverend J.C. Mensah Memorial Methodist Church
- Conquerors Chapel International
- Seventh-Day Adventist Church (SDA)
- International Central Gospel Church
- Grace Chapel
- Halel Community Church
- Deeper Life
- Watered Garden
- Evangelical Presbyterian Church of Ghana Dansoman(Shalom Parish)
- Akweibu Basic School
- Holy Family Catholic Church on Kwashieman Rd.
- Blessed schools complex
- May's Educational center
- Presbyterian Church of Ghana-Victory Congregation
- Presbyterian Church of Ghana-Emmanuel Congregation
- Christ Kingdom Charismatic Ministries International Dansoman Market
- Gospel Light International Church (GLIC) - Achievers' Cathedral

== Organizations ==
- ID Ghana is a microfinance institution.
- Gevibe Limited is a I.T Company.

== Notable residents ==
- N. A. Adjin-Tettey (born 1930), academic
- Daniel Agyei (born 1989), footballer, professional goalkeeper who has played for Liberty Professionals
- E. L (born 1989), musician, award-winning artist known for hits like "Koko"
- Comfort Asamoah (born 1960), politician
- Sam Korankye Ankrah (born 1960), minister
- Titus Awotwi Pratt (born 1947), bishop, former presiding bishop of the Methodist Church Ghana
- Fritz Baffour (born 1952), politician, former Minister for Information and National Orientation in Ghana
- Terry Bonchaka (1982–2003), musician, hiplife artist known for songs like "Pulele"
- Funny Face (born 1981), comedian, known for his role in the TV series Chorkor Trotro
- M3NSA (born 1981), musician, member of the FOKN Bois duo
- Kaakie (born 1991), musician, dancehall artist known for tracks like "Too Much"
- Ave Kludze (born 1966), engineer, NASA scientist recognized for his work in aerospace engineering
- Willy Kumado (born 2002), footballer
- Nana Ansah Kwao IV (born 1975), traditional leader, chief of Akwamu
- Yvonne Nelson (born 1985), actress, starred in films like House of Gold
- Ursula Owusu (born 1964), politician, Minister for Communications and Member of Parliament
- Ebony (1997–2018), musician, dancehall artist known for hits like "Maame Hw3"
- Samini (born 1981), musician, reggae and dancehall artist with albums like Dagaati
- Theresa Amerley Tagoe (1943–2010), politician, former Deputy Minister of Greater Accra Region
- Emmanuel Tagoe (born 1989), professional lightweight boxer
- Cindy Thompson (born 1980), musician, gospel singer known for the song "Awurade Kasa"
- Tic Tac (born 1980), musician, hiplife artist
- Trigmatic (born 1984), musician, rapper and songwriter
- Alfred Oko Vanderpuije (born 1955), politician, former Mayor of Accra
- Paapa Yankson (1944–2017), musician, highlife singer
