= Cindy Thompson =

Ghanaian gospel musician

- Also known as: Cindy Quainoo
- Born: Ghana
- Genres: gospel
- Occupation: Musician
- Instrument: Voice

Cindy Thompson (now Cindy Quainoo) is a veteran Ghanaian gospel musician. She shot to fame with her song "Awurade Kasa". The song was subsequently used for political gain by the New Patriotic Party in 2000.

== Music career ==
Thompson started singing at eight years old. She became an alto singer in her church choir and later in the national choir of the church. Her singing career begun with ministrations in Dansoman, before performing at functions, competitions, and church services. Cindy has five albums to her credit, notable among them being her 1998 "Onokwafo Nyame" album and 2000 "Cindy's Messiah" album. She has featured on a number of albums such as one by contemporary musician, Nana Kojo, titled "Woye Kronkron".

== Awards ==
Thompson has won a number of awards, including Gospel Song of the Year 2000, Gospel Album of the Year, Best Female Vocal Performance, Gospel Song of the Period (2000 - 2002), Gospel Album of the Period (2000 - 2002), Best Praise Song of the Period (2000 - 2002) and Outstanding Artist of the Year. She also received a National Award from former Ghanaian president John Agyekum Kuffour.

== Major Singles ==
- Awurade Kasa (meaning - 'God Speak')
- Dromo Sonn (meaning - 'It is All Grace')
- Anwawa Do (meaning - 'Wonderful Love')
- Nkunimdie (meaning - 'Victory')
- Makokyem Nyame (meaning - 'God, My Shield and Defender')
- Awurade Wo Ne Made Nyina (meaning - 'God You are My Everything')
- Kwankyerefo Jesus (meaning - 'Jesus the Shepherd')
- Nyame Aguama (meaning - 'The Lamb of God')
- Awurade Bohye (meaning - 'God's Promise')
- Eyi Ne Odo (meaning - 'This Is Love')
