= Batakari Day =

Ghanaian national holiday

National Batakari Day
- Observed by: Ghana
- Type: National
- Date: First Friday of every month
- Frequency: monthly

National Batakari Day (or simply Batakari Day) is a national day of celebration across Ghana, held on the first Friday of every month. Though not mandatory, everybody living in Ghana is expected to wear the Batakari smock to their various workplaces or schools. First declared on September 4, 2015, by the Ministry of Tourism, the day is meant to expose the culture of northerners as part of SADA's comprehensive development agenda for Ghana's three most deprived regions.

== See also ==
- Batakari Festival
- World Damba Festival
- National Sanitation Day
