= Ishmael Philemon Ackon =

Ghanaian singer

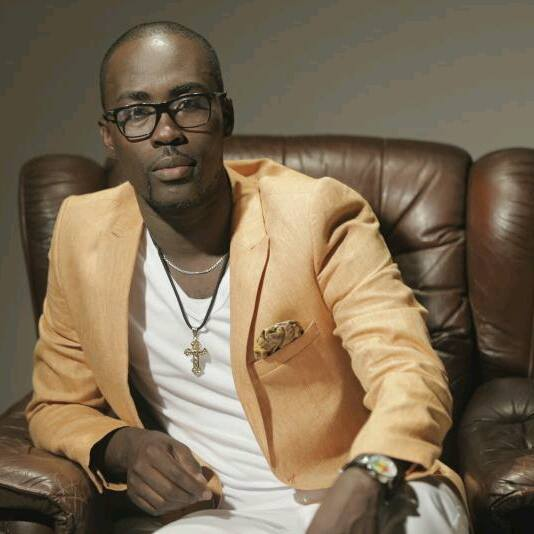
- Ishmael Philemon Ackon

Background information
- Birth name: Ishmael Philemon Ackon
- Born: October 15, 1980 (age 44); Kumasi, Ghana
- Origin: Ghana
- Genres: Gospel
- Occupation(s): Singer, songwriter, composer
- Labels: Ai-Phil Recordz GH
- Spouse: Mary Joy Yap Dugaduga

Ishmael Philemon Ackon is a Ghanaian gospel singer, songwriter and composer, known as Bro. Philemon.

== Early life ==
Ackon was born on 15 October 1980 in the suburbs of Kumasi in Manse, in Ghana. He enjoyed the influence of music through church. His parents, Beatrice Ivy Ackon and the late Reverend Emmanuel Eddie E. Ackon, were members of the Methodist Church.

== Personal life ==
Through the support of his parents Ackon became a Christian and took on the name Brother Philemon. He attended Saint John's Secondary School located in Sekondi, Ghana. After completing the early years of school he graduated from the University of Ghana and the University of Education, Winneba. Along with his music certificate he also holds a bachelor's degree in fine arts, having majored in theater management. Bro. Philemon has travelled to Hong Kong, Dubai, Ethiopia, Finland, Sweden, Denmark, UK, Belgium, Norway, Thailand and the Philippines. He currently resides in China with his wife Mary Joy Yap Dugaduga and children Beatrice Ivy-Joy Ackon and Trixie Efua-Otuah Ackon. They attend and worship at the Shenzhen International Fellowship. Bro Philemon is a worship leader at the Shenzhen International Fellowship which has 700 to 1000 membership.

== Professional life ==
Bro. Philemon has travelled to Hong Kong, Egypt, Dubai, Ethiopia, Finland, Sweden, Denmark, UK, Belgium propagating the gospel through music. His album, entitled M'asan Aban, has been released under the reputable Ai-Phil Recordz GH and is dedicated to his late father. The album has collaborations with noted Ghanaians in the music industry, including Morris Babyface with George Spartz on guitars, Alexandra, OJ of "Etse S3n" Fame, and Senam.

== Music ==
(M'asan Aba Album)

- "It Is Well" featuring Morris Babyface
- "Me Nsa Sa Da" (featuring OJ)
- "Ohen A Oreba" - The Coming King...
- "Sweetest Name" - Remix
- "Mobo Wo Dzin Featuring Morris Babyface
- "M'asan Aba
- "Mo Nsuro
- "Mogya Bi Featuring Alexandra Aboagye
- "I'm Thirsty (Cover of Joe Monto)

Single Release 2015

- "All The Glory
- "Meda W'ase
- "Fill Me Up Featuring Yayo

== Awards ==
- 2014 All Africa Music Awards Nigeria – Best Male Artist in African Inspirational Music
- 2014 Africa Gospel Music Awards Winner UK- Artist of the Year North Africa/Middle East/Asia
- 2013 Ghana Gospel Industry Awards Ghana
- 2013 Africa Gospel Music Awards UK winner
