= Akwaboah Snr. =

Ghanaian highlife musician (died 2023)

Background information
- Born: Kwadwo Akwaboah; Mampong Beposo, Ghana
- Died: 16 May 2023 Kumasi, Ghana
- Genres: Highlife
- Occupations: Singer, song-writer, Producer

Kwadwo Akwaboah (died 16 May 2023), popularly known as Akwaboah Senior (Snr.), was a Ghanaian singer-songwriter and record producer from Mampong Beposo. He was known for the popular song ''Awerɛkyekyerɛ'', ''Hini Me'' and many others. He was the father of the renowned Ghanaian musician Akwaboah Jnr.

== Life and career ==
Akwaboah Snr. was born in Mampong Beposo.

Akwaboah Snr. was a keyboardist who played for a lot of local and international bands like Oheneba Ntim Barima Band and others.

Akwaboah Snr. was also a talented guitarist who often played with some of Ghana's great musicians, including the Rex Owusu Marfo and the late C.K. Mann.

== Death ==
Akwaboah Snr. was diagnosed with glaucoma for some years, and died on 16 May 2023 at the Komfo Anokye Teaching Hospital in Kumasi, Ashanti Region of Ghana. His death was announced by his son Akwaboah Jnr. in an Instagram post where he shared a photo of his father with the caption: "RIP DADDY."

== See also ==
- List of Ghanaian musicians
