= Alpha Beta Christian College =

Coordinates: 5.54954386170979°N 0.26379606771744013°W

Alpha Beta Christian College (ABCC) is a private co-educational secondary school founded in 2004. It is located in Dansoman, Accra, Ghana, and offers the Cambridge International Programmes IGCSE (International General Certificate of Secondary Education) and A-Levels.

== Curriculum ==
ABCC offers the British curriculum in forms 1-3 (Pre-IGCSE), forms 4-5 (IGCSE) and Lower and Upper Sixth (A-Levels). In addition to standard academic subjects, ABCC also offers Sports, Art, PE, Foundations for Living, Leadership programmes, Community service and a Career and Counselling service.

== Accreditations and membership ==
ABCC is a CIE British Council Attached Centre and is also a member of the Association of Christian Schools International (ACSI). ABCC is also a member of the International Schools Sports Association of Ghana (ISSAG).
