= Ave Kludze =

American engineer

- Born: Hohoe, Ghana
- Education: Adisadel College; Swedru Secondary School
- Alma mater: Rutgers University (BSc); Johns Hopkins University (MSc); George Washington University (PhD)
- Scientific career
- Fields: Complex systems engineering and design
- Institutions: NASA

Ave K. P. Kludze Jr. is an American aerospace engineer and civil servant, specializing in complex systems engineering and design. He is a senior NASA Spacecraft Systems Engineer.

== Early life and education ==
Kludze was born in Hohoe, in the Volta Region of Ghana, the son of Anselmus Kludze, a legal reformer who served as a Justice of the Supreme Court of Ghana and Comfort Brempong who worked with the Bank of Ghana. He grew up in Dansoman-Sahara, a suburb of Accra. His love of science began at an early age; his parents once remarked that they were fearful to leave him at home in case he dismantled the radio. At friends’ houses, he would take apart their televisions to see how they worked. By his own admission, Kludze's fascination with aviation began with a trip to the airport in Accra as a young boy. His father had intended him to become a lawyer but supported him regardless in his ambitions.

He emigrated to the United States in the late 1980s with only a high school diploma from the Adisadel College in Cape Coast, Ghana and 'A' levels from Swedru Secondary School. Shortly after his arrival in the United States, he enrolled at Rutgers University where he set out to pursue a bachelor's degree in electrical engineering. He went on to complete a master's degree in systems engineering at Johns Hopkins University, followed by a PhD in systems engineering at George Washington University.

== Career ==
Kludze has held positions at various NASA Centers including the NASA Langley Research Center in Virginia and NASA/Goddard Space Flight Center in Maryland, where he became if not the first African, the first Ghanaian to ever fly (command and control) a Spacecraft in Orbit (including the ERBS and TRMM Spececrafts, etc. for NASA from a mission control center).

He designed the Human Locator System, which he called the "HuLos" in partial fulfillment of the requirements for his master's degree at the Johns Hopkins University. The HuLos uses nanotechnology (microscopic technology) and is intended to locate human beings anywhere on this planet using satellite communication, GPS and other technologies. What made the system unique at the time of its conception, though considered weird by even his advisor, were the miniaturized size and the concept of global location. The device is to be implanted under the human skull, skin bone or teeth and activated when required. The system as envisioned could be used e.g. in locating missing children, the elderly, stolen cars and hardened criminals. The thesis which contains the design is currently at the Johns Hopkins Applied Physics Laboratory.

In 2004, Kludze and a group of NASA engineers developed the Extravehicular Activity Infrared (EVA IR) camera for space-walking astronauts. The EVA IR camera was designed to fulfill a critical inspection need for the Shuttle Program; the on-orbit IR Camera can detect crack and surface defects in the Reinforced Carbon-Carbon (RCC) sections of the Space Shuttle's Thermal Protection System. This camera may help discover and prevent some of the problems leading to the disintegration of the Space Shuttle Columbia.

Kludze was selected to join the NASA Engineering and Safety Center (NESC), an organization created after the Columbia incident, as a systems engineering expert. Before joining the NESC, Kludze was the manager of NASA Langley's state-of-the-art Integrated Design Center (IDC) which he helped to develop. He was also the Traceability and Verification Manager for the CALIPSO spacecraft. His pioneering work in systems engineering has been published worldwide; he has a number of publications, several NASA and external awards and recognitions to his credit. Kludze is involved in several space initiatives including the implementation of the U.S. President's Space Exploration Vision to the Moon and Mars.beyond.

In 2002, Kludze was recognised and honoured at the Second Biennial Adisadel College Excellence Awards at a ceremony at the State House in Accra, by the Adisadel College Old Boys Association and the college. He was profiled on Cable News Network (CNN) and the British Broadcasting Corporation (BBC).
