= Yusuf Soalih Ajura =

Ghanaian religious leader (1890–2004)

Islamic scholar Yusuf Soalih Ajura

Personal life
- Born: Yusuf; 1890 contested Ejura, British Gold Cost
- Died: 22 December 2004 (aged 114) Tamale Ghana
- Resting place: Anbariyya Islamic Institute
- Region: West Africa
- Other name: Afa Ajura
- Occupation: Islamic Instructor; Political Activist

Religious life
- Religion: Islam
- Denomination: Sunni
- Jurisprudence: Hanbali
- Movement: Salafi

Yusuf Soalih also called Afa Ajura (1890–2004), was a Ghanaian Islamic scholar, a preacher, political activist, and the founder and leader of a sect in Ghana. Afa Ajura was a proponent of Sunni Islam shunning pre-Islamic pagan practices, and whom some have referred to as a precursor to Wahhabi reformism in Ghana. He established the Anbariyya Islamic Institute in Tamale in the 1940s. He died in Tamale on 22 December 2004. He was succeeded by Saeed Abubakr Zakaria in 2007 as leader of the Anbariya Sunni Community.

== See also ==
- Moulvi Abdul Wahab Adam
- Yaa-Naa Yakubu Andani II
