= Yaw Ray =

Ghanaian musical artist

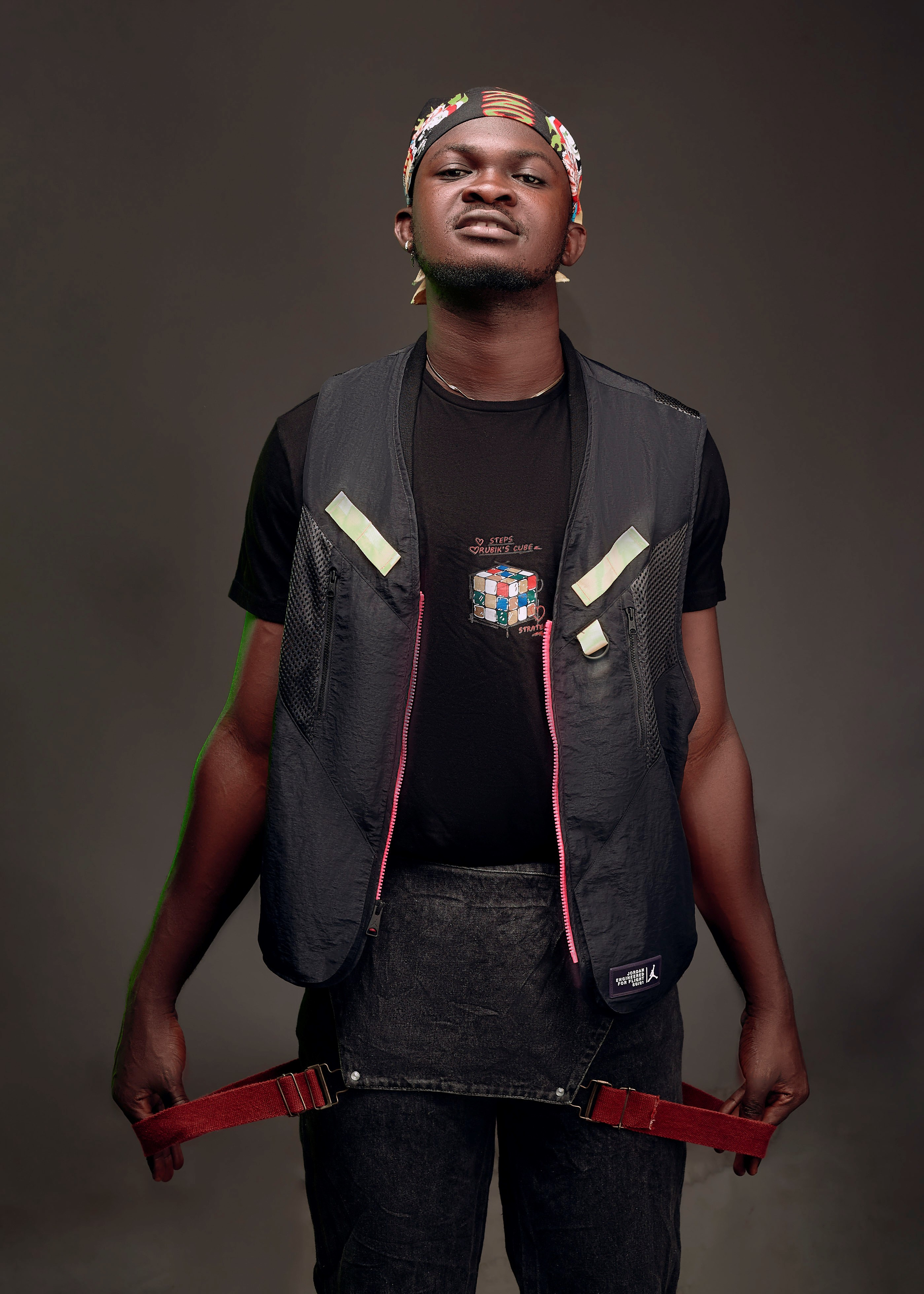
- Yaw Ray in the studio

Background information
- Born: Kingsley Agyapong Boateng; 15 September 1995 (age 30); Kumasi, Ghana
- Origin: Africa, Ghana
- Genres: Afro pop, Highlife, Afrobeats
- Occupations: Artist, Singer-songwriter
- Instruments: Vocals; guitar
- Years active: 2019–present
- Label: YawRay Music Group (YMG)
- Website: https://yawraymusicgroup.com/

Kingsley Agyapong Boateng (also known as Yaw Ray) is a Ghanaian artist, singer-songwriter and performer. He combines the genres of highlife, Afrobeats, R&B, and Dancehall in his music.

== Early life and education ==
Ray was born on 15 September 1995 and hails from Kumasi in the Ashanti Region of Ghana. He had his tertiary education at the University of Education, Winneba.

== Career ==
Ray began his music career as a rapper with his colleague in high school who later became a producer. They started recording demos using church instruments. In 2019, Ray was signed by Celebrity Barber records in a 5year contract. In 2023, he joined a new record label called YawRay Music Group (YMG).

=== Discography ===
- Delay not Denial
- Sugar
- Sika
- Boa me
- Anigye
- Everlasting
- Need
- Control
- Look at You
- Today

== Controversy ==
In September 2020, Ray said Kuami Eugene is used to sampling other people's music and not the originator of his songs after he was accused of imitating Eugene's music as well as his vocals.
