= QwameGaby =

Ghanaian gospel musician

- Born: QwameGaby; January 21, 1985 (age 40)
- Occupation: Gospel Musician
- Years active: 1985–present

QwameGaby is the stage name of Gabriel Kwame, a Ghanaian gospel singer and early proponent of the Ghanaian "Gospel" genre. He is employed by Tigo, a mobile network.

Born in Accra, he began making music in his early school days. He studied at the Accra Academy School and then attended the Institute of Professional Studies, now University of Professional Studies in Accra. There he attained the CIM qualification from the Chartered Institute of Marketing UK, and is currently a Chartered Marketer

== Recognition and musical style ==
QwameGaby began performing Ghana gospel music in June 2014 at the Kumasi Sports Stadium. His first hit single was "Wonderful God" featuring Cwesi Oteng, released in June 2014. His second hit single was "Ogya" featuring D Black and produced by DJbreezy, released in September 2014.

== Music videos ==
- Wonderful God
- Ogya

== Singles ==
- "Wonderful God featuring Cwesi Oteng".
- "Ogya featuring D Black and produced by DJbreezy".
