= Anbariya Sunni Community =

Islamic religious and cultural organization

Anbariya
- Anbariya Sunni Community
- Founder: Yusuf Soalih Ajura
- Coordinates: 9.414073°N 0.841773°W

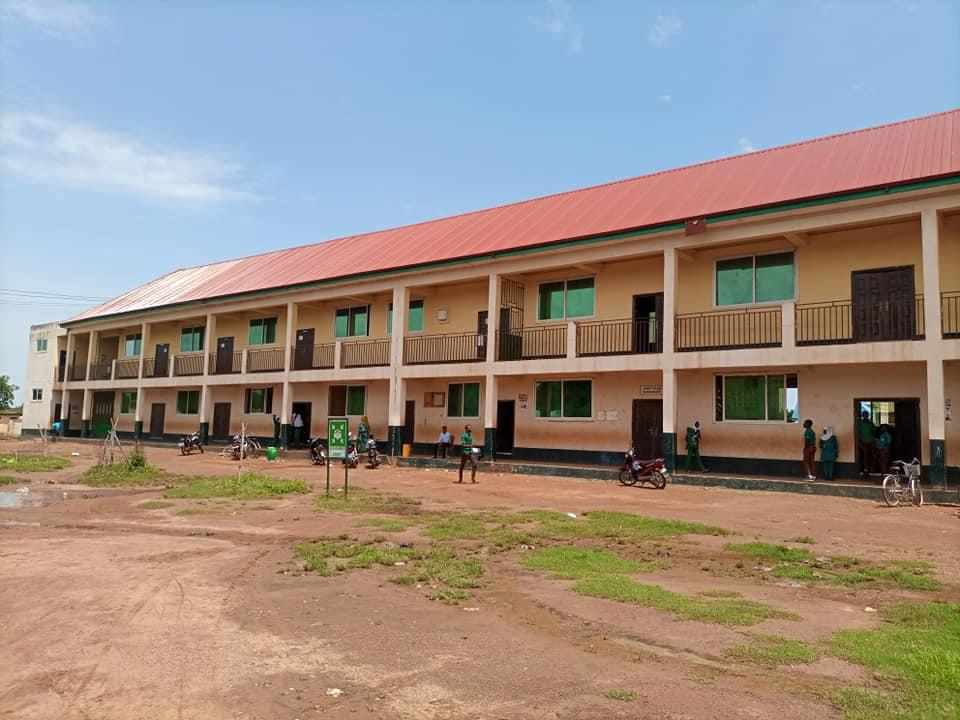
Main Campus of Anbariya Islamic Institute

Anbariya Sunni Community is an independent Islamic religious and cultural organization. It was founded by Yusuf Soalih Ajura and has its headquarters in Tamale, Ghana. It is headed by Saeed Abubakr Zakaria.

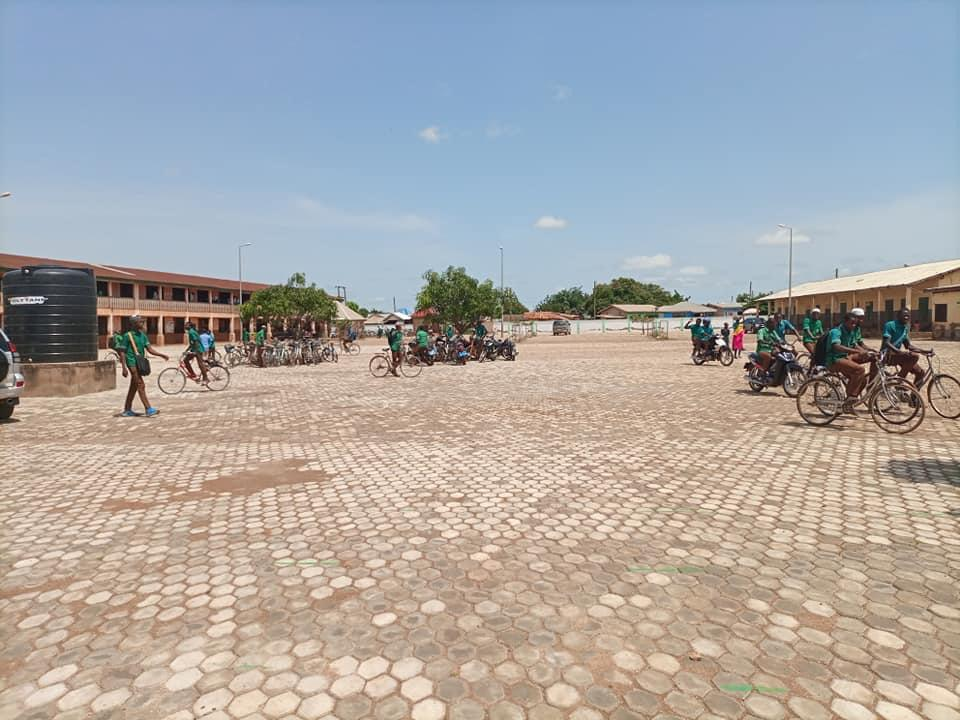
Campus of Anbariya Islamic Institute
