= Nii Okai =

Ghanaian gospel musician (born 1977)

- Born: Ernest Nii-Okai Okai; September 19, 1977 (age 48); Tema, Ghana
- Genres: Gospel, Urban contemporary gospel
- Occupations: Singer, song writer
- Instrument: Vocals
- Years active: (2004–present)
- Label: "House of Virtue"
- Website: www.niiokai.com

Nii Okai (Ernest Nii-Okai Okai, born September 19, 1977) is a Ghanaian Contemporary gospel singer and a choir leader.

== Early life and education ==
Nii Okai had his Secondary School education at Mfantsipim School in Cape Coast, Central Region of Ghana and furthered at the Kwame Nkrumah University of Science and Technology. He currently holds an MA in Mission and Theology.

Nii Okai in the mid 2010 set up "Nii Okai Ministries", a team of vagrant music missionaries based in Tema, Ghana.

== Music career ==
Nii Okai is currently the leader of "Harbour City Mass Choir" (H.C.M.C.), an inter-denominational music ministry based in Tema, Ghana. He came into the limelight when he released his first album "Moko Be". An 8-track music album produced by one of the great multi-talented instrumentalists in Ghana, KODA with its hit songs; "Woana Na" and "Moko Be". The album featured "Danny Nettey", "Nana Yaa Amihere" among others.

=== Nii Okai and "The Harbour City Mass Choir" ===
Nii Okai is the co-founder of "Harbour City Mass Choir" an inter-denominational music ministry based in Tema, Ghana with a clear purpose of impacting the youth through contemporary gospel music, school outreach programs, music ministry workshops as well as peer and social counseling.

Nii Okai has 5 albums to his credit. "Moko Be", "Hymnz Unlimited", "Worshipful", "Saving Hearts" and "Holy writings" which he received an award with the "Saving Hearts" album at the 16th edition of Vodafone Ghana Music Awards for Music for Development Award.

== Personal life ==
Nii is a professional banker and married to Yaa Okai. The couple has 3 children. He was a member of the "St. Paul's Methodist Church" in Tema. He is currently the lead pastor at International House of Virtue popularly known as the iChurch in Tema.

Nii Okai is known for his strong commitment to the cause of contemporary gospel music in Ghana and has worked with the likes of Kofi Dua Anto (KODA), Eugene Zuta, Danny Nettey, Diana Hopeson among others.

== Discography ==
=== Albums ===
Title	Album details
Moko Be	Release year: 2004
Worshipful	Release year: 2006
Hymnz Unlimited	Release year: 2009
Holy Writings	Release year: 2012
Saving Hearts	Release year: 2015
Yesu Hi	Release year: 2017

=== Major Singles ===
- Woana na
- Moko be Produced by KODA

== Awards and nominations ==
Year	Event	Prize	Recipient / Nominated work	Result	Ref
2015	Ghana Music Awards	Music for Development	Saving Hearts	Won	
2015	Christian Community Music Awards	Most Wanted Timeless Song	Himself	Won	
2014	Africa Gospel Music Awards	Artiste of the Year West Africa	Himself	Nominated	
2014	MTN/4syte TV Music Video Awards	Best Gospel Video	You Are Jesus	Nominated	
