= Comfort Annor =

Ghanaian musician (1949 – 2015)

- Born: Comfort Otubea; 1949; Adukrom, Eastern Region
- Died: 22 February 2015 (aged 66); Kumasi, Ghana
- Citizenship: Ghanaian
- Occupation: Gospel musician
- Title: Deaconess of Pentecost Church
- Children: 7

Comfort Annor (1949 – 22 February 2015) was a Ghanaian musician known for her soothing voice, which alternated between a mezzo-soprano and a contralto in the 1990s.

== Birth and death ==
Annor, also known as Ama Otu Be, was a Deaconess of the Church of Pentecost and hailed from Adukrom in the Eastern Region of Ghana. She had seven children.

Annor died on 22 February 2015 at the Komfo Anokye Teaching Hospital, aged 66. The cause was unpublicized, though she had liver and kidney ailments since October 2014.

== Songs ==
Comfort's songs include "Asaase Dahɔ Gyan", "W’awo Me ɔba", "Abraham Sarah", "Mewo Agyapadeɛ" and "Hena Na W’aye". Her major album is "Dom Hene", released in 2006 with ten songs.
