= King Ayisoba =

Ghanaian musician

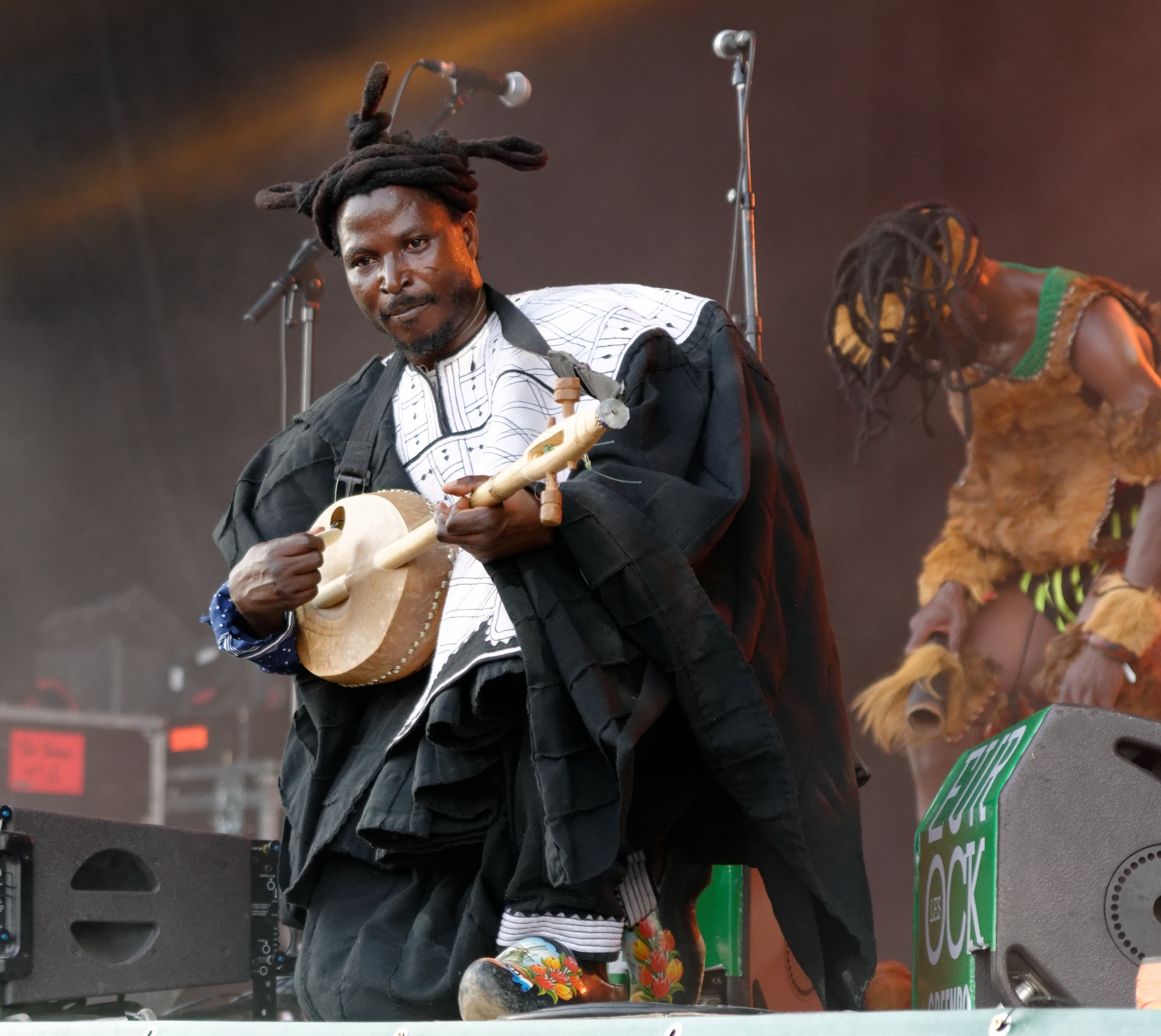
- King Ayisoba at Eurockéennes 2015

Background information
- Born: Albert Apoozore; Bongo Soe
- Occupation: musician
- Years active: 2005–present

King Ayisoba born Albert Apoozore (c. 1974) is a Ghanaian traditional musician known for his unique style of music alongside the kologo.

== Early life ==
Ayisoba was born in Bongo Soe in the Upper East Region of Ghana.

== Career ==
He used to play and sing along with the late Terry Bonchaka, before Terry's death.

== Discography ==
=== Studio albums ===
- 2006: Modern Ghanaians
- 2008: Africa
- 2012: Don't Do The Bad Thing
- 2014: Wicked Leaders
- 2017: 1000 Can Die
- 2023: Work Hard

== Awards ==
Year	Event	Prize	Result	Reference
2007	Ghana Music Awards	Song of the Year	Won	
2007	Ghana Music Awards	Traditional Song of the Year	Won	

== See also ==
- Batakari Festival
