= Kaakie =

Ghanaian dancehall musician

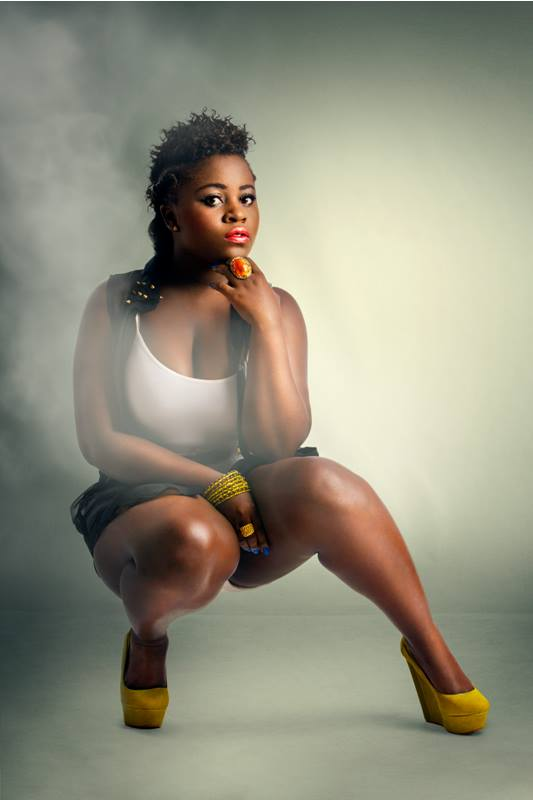

Background information
- Born: Grace Kaki Awo Ocansey; 28 March 1991 (age 35); Accra, Ghana
- Genres: Dancehall, Hiplife
- Occupation: Singer
- Years active: 2012–present
- Label: Xtra Large Music

Grace Kaki Awo Ocansey (born March 28, 1991), popularly known as Kaakie, is a Ghanaian dancehall artist. She signed her first record deal with Xtra Large Music. Kaakie grew up as a music lover who listened to various genres of music and did karaoke versions for many of the ones she cherished. At the university, an opportunity came for her to feature in one of the reality shows on TV called Stars Of The Future. She was part of the singing competition that run on Ghanaian TV for weeks; but got evicted along the way (she was rated 5th). From there, she met up with renowned Ghanaian Sound Engineer/Executive Producer, JMJ Baby (Joshua Raphaelson) – Courtesy Charter House – and she got signed to his record label – XTRA LARGE MUSIC.

== Education ==
Kaakie had her basic education at St. Martin De Porres Basic School in Dansoman, she continued to Achimota School where she was a member of the Scripture Union. Kaakie holds a BSc Midwifery degree from the University of Ghana. She earned her Master's degree from the Anglia Ruskin University in 2019.

== Personal life ==
Kaakie got married in a traditional ceremony on January 2, 2020.

== Awards and nominations ==
=== KORA Awards ===
Year	Recipient/Nominated Word	Award	Result
2016	Kaakie	Best Promising Female Artiste	Nominated

=== Ghana Music Awards ===
Year	Nominee / work	Award	Result
2013	Herself	Reggae and Dancehall Artiste of the Year	Won
2013	Herself	New Artiste of the Year	Won
2017	Herself	Best Reggae/Dancehall Song of the Year	Nominated

=== BASS Awards ===
Year	Nominee / work	Award	Result
2013	Herself	Best Female Vocalist	Won
