= Danny Nettey =

Ghanaian gospel musician (1968–2016)

- Born: Daniel Tetteh Nettey; 19 September 1968; Accra, Ghana
- Died: 15 July 2016 (aged 47) Accra, Ghana
- Genres: Gospel, Urban contemporary gospel
- Occupations: Singer, songwriter, organist
- Years active: (1995–2016)
- Website: www.dannynettey.com

Danny Nettey (19 September 1968 – 15 July 2016) was a Ghanaian musician and songwriter. He was best described as one of the pioneers of Contemporary Gospel music in Ghana.

== Early life and education ==
Danny was born in Accra where he developed the love for music at an early age. Danny Nettey was known for writing songs for most gospel artistes in the country and songs which were being ministered in his local church. He attended High school at Accra Academy where he became the music director and also the President of the local Scripture Union Fellowship.

== Music career ==
Beginning his music career, Danny Nettey started his own group, "Danny Nettey and Pals". This group sought to take gospel to the Secondary Schools and ministering in churches across West Africa through the word and song ministration. Danny Nettey had three albums to his credit, namely; "Positive Change", "This Time" and "I believe".

Through his music ministration, he travelled to the United Kingdom and United States and ministered on several platforms including performing on stage with; Bishop T. D. Jakes, Don Moen, Ron Winans, Bebe Winans, Ron Kenoly, Kirk Franklin, Lionel Peterson, Israel Houghton, and Alvin Slaughter.

Minister Danny Nettey mentored most gospel artistes in Ghana and graced several events including the "Joe Beecham Ministries" by Pastor Joe Beecham and Nii Okai's "Saving Hearts" album launch.

== Death ==
Nettey was found unconscious in the early hours of 15 July 2016. This was confirmed to Joy News' Nhyira Addo by family members. According to family, he was bubbly all night and had prayed with his family shortly before retiring to bed. He was discovered to be unconscious and was taken to hospital by his mother and brother, where the doctor pronounced him dead on arrival.

== Discography ==
=== Albums ===
Year	Title
1995	Positive Change
1996	This Time
2006	I Believe

=== Singles ===
- "God Alone"
- "Praise Jehovah"
- "I Worship You"
- "God is Good"
- "Metease a (If I live)"
