= Atongo Zimba =

Ghanaian musician and griot

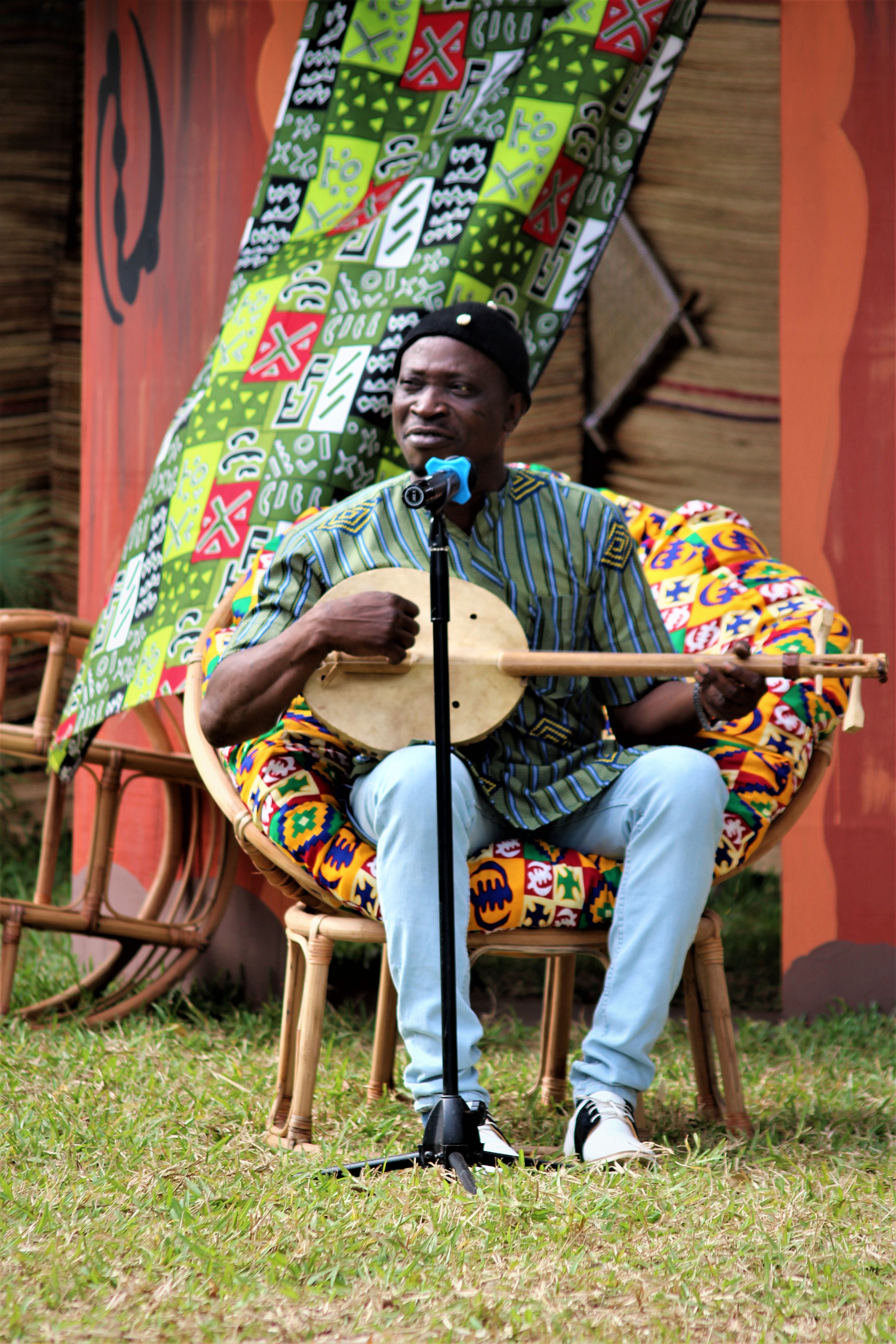

Background information
- Also known as: Ghanaian
- Born: 1967 (age 57–58)
- Origin: Ghana
- Genres: Highlife
- Occupation: Griot
- Years active: 1994-present
- Labels: Hippo Records

Atongo Zimba (born 1967) is a musician and griot from Ghana. His tours in Europe, South America and Africa include a benefit for the 2010 Haiti earthquake, at the Alliance Française in Accra. His 1994 album Allah Mongode was recorded in Switzerland. His album Barefoot in the Sand was nominated "African CD of the Year" in 2007 by Amsterdam television. His recording of "In Heaven There Is No Beer | No Beer in Heaven" was a major hit in Ghana in 2004.

== Discography ==
- Allah Mongode 1994
- Savannah Breeze 2005
- Barefoot in the Sand (October 2007)
- 'A to Z' Album
