= Nayaah (gospel singer) =

Ghanaian gospel musician

- Birth name: Nana Yaa
- Born: Accra, Ghana
- Genres: Gospel, Urban contemporary gospel
- Occupation(s): Singer, songwriter
- Years active: (2013–present)
- Website: www.nayaahministry.com

Nana Yaa, better known by her stage name Nayaah, is a Ghanaian Gospel singer and songwriter based in Luton, United Kingdom.

== Early life ==
She began singing when she was 10 years old in Accra, Ghana and has toured Ghana and Nigeria extensively.

== Awards and nominations ==
| Year | Event | Prize | Recipient / Nominated work | Result | Ref |
|---|---|---|---|---|---|
| 2017 | Africa Gospel Awards | Artists of excellence Europe | Herself | Nominated | |
| 2015 | Africa Gospel Awards | Discovery Artiste of the Year | Herself | Nominated | |
| 2015 | Praisetek Gospel Music Awards | Outstanding Praise and Worship Leader | Herself | Won | |
| 2014 | Prosperity Gospel Awards | Female Gospel Artiste of the Year | Herself | Won | |
| 2014 | Prestigious Africa Gospel Awards | Discovery of the Year | Herself | Nominated | |

== Discography ==
=== Albums ===
| Year | Title | Production credit | Ref |
|---|---|---|---|
| 2013 | God is not a man | Kwame Keys (Echoed Music) | |

=== Singles ===
| Year | Title | Production credit | Ref |
|---|---|---|---|
| 2017 | Pillar | Kwame Keys (Echoed Music) | |
| 2015 | You're Great | Kwame Keys (Echoed Music) | |
| 2014 | Worship Medley | Kwame Keys (Echoed Music) | |
| 2014 | God | Kwame Keys (Echoed Music) | |
