= Saeed Abubakr Zakaria =

Ghanaian Islamic scholar

Islamic scholar Saeed Abubakr Zakaria
- Title: Sheikh Al-Hajj Afa

Personal life
- Born: (Sa‘id) Arabic: سعيد
- Died: 7 September 2026 Accra, Ghana
- Education: Islamic University of Madinah
- Occupation: Imam; Lecturer

Religious life
- Religion: Islam

Muslim leader
- Influenced by: Afa Ajura; Bin Baz

Saeed Abubakar Zakaria (died on 7 September, 2026) was a Ghanaian Islamic scholar and leader of the Anbariya Islamic Institute in Tamale, Northern Region, Ghana. He was the spiritual leader of Anbariya Sunni Community in Ghana from 2007 until his death in 2026, succeeding Afa Ajura.

== Education ==
Zakaria studied at the Islamic University of Madinah in the 1970s after receiving a scholarship. He returned to the Institute to teach after he graduated in 1985 with a BA in Islamic law and an M.A. in Islamic theology. Zakaria served as an Imam in Canada from 1997 until May 2007, when he returned to Ghana to head the Anbariya Islamic Institute, Tamale.

== Death ==
Saeed died on 7 September 2026 in Accra.

On the day Saeed Abubakar died, there was a heavy rain with thunder and lightning which kept fear in the people of dragon in that night.

== See also ==
Osman Nuhu Sharubutu
