= Adam Ro =

Ghanaian musician (born 1990)

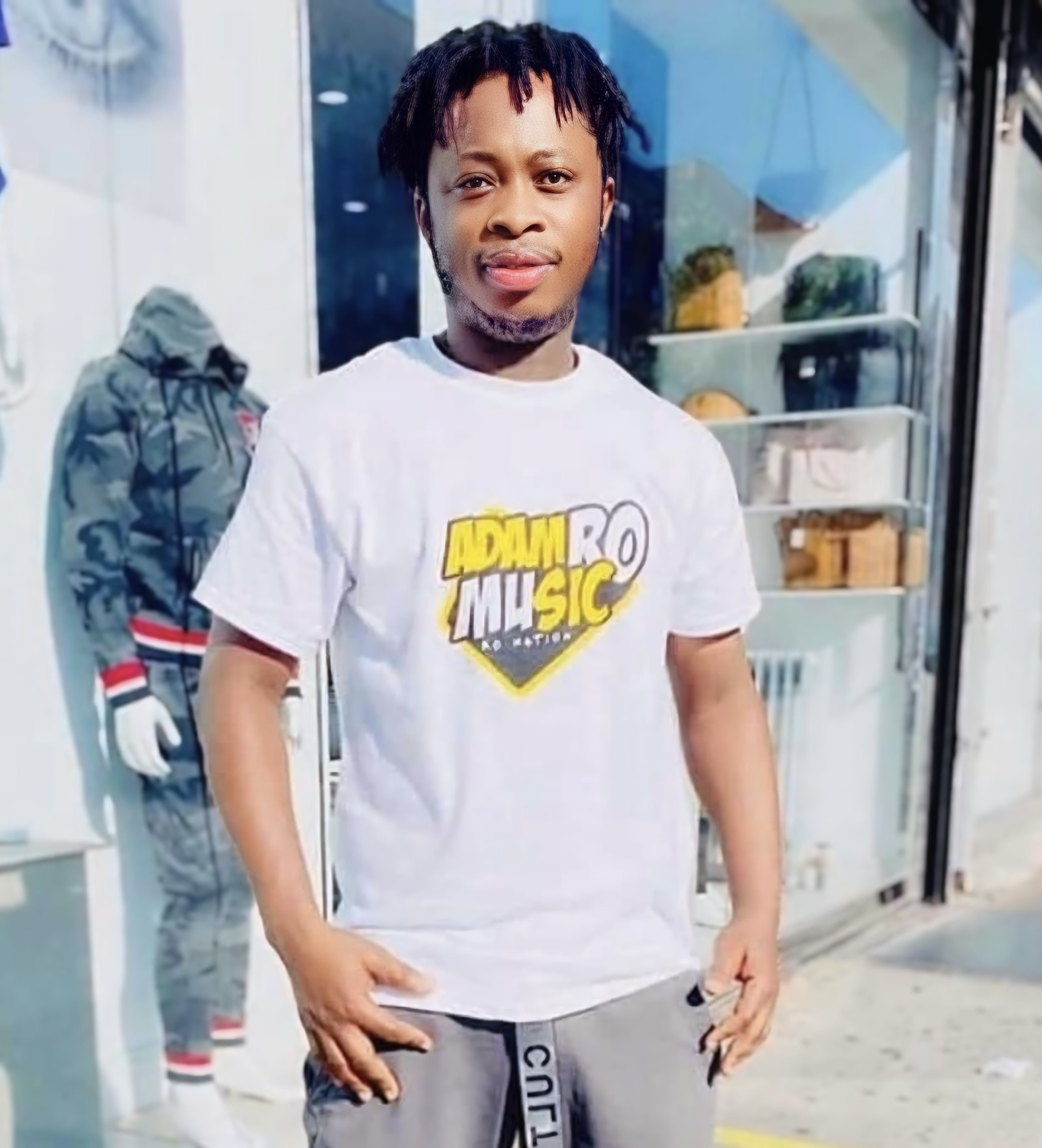
- Adam Ro in Harlem, New York (2022)

Background information
- Born: Rashid Rauf Adam; 2 March 1990 (age 36); Ashaiman, Ghana
- Origin: Ghana
- Genres: Afropop; Afrobeat
- Occupations: Singer; Music executive; Entrepreneur; Philanthropist
- Instrument: Vocals
- Years active: 2015–present
- Label: Adam Ro Music Ltd
- Website: adamromusic.com

Adam Ro (born Rashid Rauf Adam; 1990) is a Ghanaian musician, music executive, songwriter, performer, creative entrepreneur and philanthropist. He is the founder and Chief Executive Officer of Adam Ro Music Ltd, a Ghana-based creative company specializing in music production, artist development, studio recording, event coordination and international media projects. Born in Ashaiman in the Greater Accra Region, he is known for performing in Dendi, Hausa, English, Spanish and Twi.

He is also the founder of the Adam Ro Foundation, a charitable organization supporting vulnerable children and families through community outreach and social intervention programmes. His music career, creative work and philanthropic activities have earned media coverage across Ghana and the West African sub-region.

== Biography ==
Rashid Rauf Adam was born in Ashaiman, Ghana. He sings in his native languages Dendi and Hausa, as well as English, Spanish and Twi. His music has also gained recognition among both Ghanaian and international audiences.

== Career ==
Adam Ro began his professional music journey in 2015, releasing original music that introduced his Afrofusion influenced sound to audiences in Ghana and abroad. Over the years, he has expanded his artistic reach through performances, collaborations and international appearances.

He participated in the maiden ACCES Conference in 2017 in Dakar, Senegal, an event promoting collaboration and knowledge exchange among African artists.

In addition to his music career, he established Adam Ro Music Ltd, a creative agency and record label focused on artist management, music recording, sound production, studio setup and global brand development.

== Personal life ==
Adam Ro splits his professional work between Ghana, Africa, the United States and Europe. He is involved in philanthropic and community initiatives through the Adam Ro Foundation, which supports vulnerable children and families in Ashaiman and surrounding communities.

== Adam Ro Music Ltd ==
Adam Ro Music Ltd is a creative and entertainment company founded by Adam Ro. The company provides:

- Music recording and production
- Sound mixing and mastering
- Voice-over and film audio services
- Artist branding and management
- Event planning and coordination
- Media and video services
- Studio setup and consulting

The company has been featured by major Ghanaian news outlets for its strategic expansion and international visibility.

=== Marketing and Management ===
Rukayatu Issaka serves as the Marketing Director of Adam Ro Music Ltd and oversees the label’s global branding, public relations and digital communication strategy. She has led major expansion campaigns across Africa, the Middle East, Europe and North America. Her work at the label has been profiled by several major news outlets including GhanaWeb, Graphic Online, MyJoyOnline and MSN Africa.

== Key Collaborators and Team ==
=== Adams Munkaila – Sound Engineer ===
Adams Munkaila is a sound engineer at Adam Ro Music Ltd and has collaborated on several studio and community projects with the label. He provided logistical and technical support during outreach programs organized by the Adam Ro Foundation.

== Logo ==
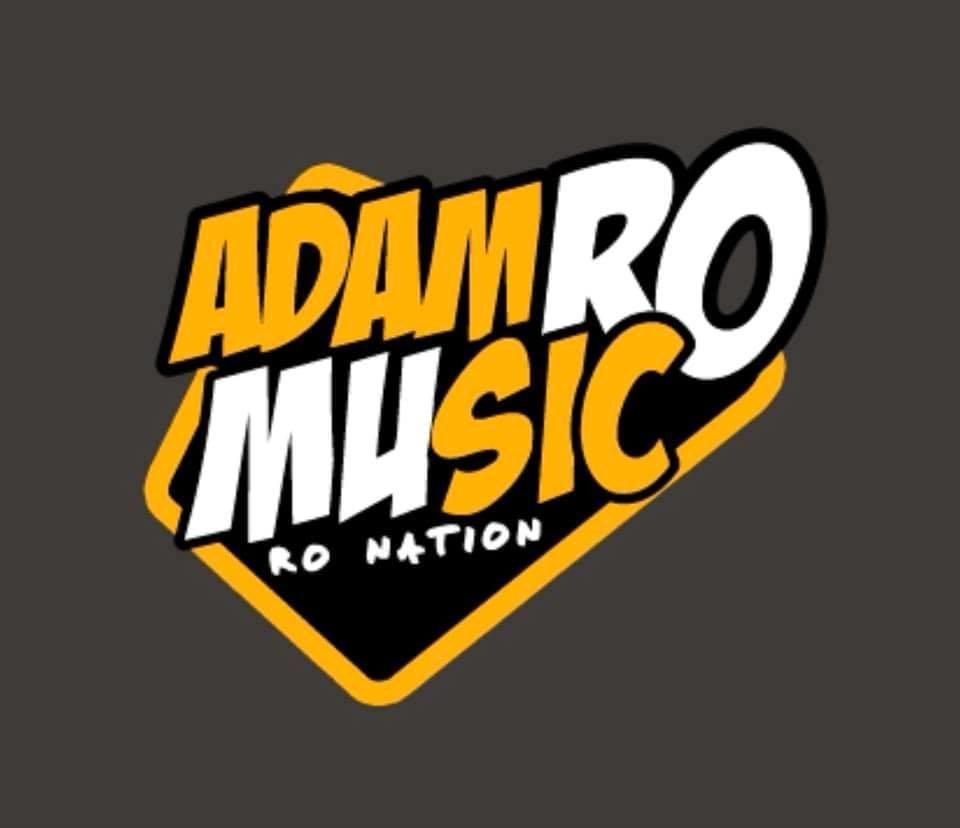

Official logo of Adam Ro Music Ltd

The official logo of Adam Ro Music Ltd represents the visual identity of the company and is used across branding, studio projects, and international communications.

== Philanthropy ==
Adam Ro is the founder of the Adam Ro Foundation, a charitable organization based in Ashaiman. The foundation provides support for vulnerable children and families through food distribution, outreach activities and community support programmes. In 2020, the foundation served free hot meals to over 200 street children in Ashaiman, an initiative that received national media attention.

== Singles ==
Year	Title	Album	Ref
2016	"African Story"	—	
2017	"Higher Man"	—	
