= Sheriff Ghale =

Ghanaian reggae artist

- Born: March 26, 1978 (age 48)
- Origin: Ghana
- Genre: Reggae
- Occupation: Singer

Mohammed Sheriff Yamusah (born March 26, 1978), known by his stage name Doobia Sheriff Ghale, is a Ghana-based international Reggae musician. He won the award for "Reggae Song of the Year" at the 2005 Ghana Music Awards for work from his album Sochira, which means 'crossroads' in Dagbani. Sherif Ghale is the founder of an NGO known as SABABAS which aim to promote cross-cultural music collaborations by providing opportunities to artist based in Northern Ghana.

== EDUCATION ==
Sheriff Ghale is obtained his Master of Philosophy in Music at the University of Ghana.

== WORK EXPERIENCE ==
1. Sheriff Ghale served as a District Culture Coordinator at Ghana Education Service from September 2000, till date.
2. He has since served as a tutor at the Tamale College of Education since April 2018 till date.

== Albums ==
- Sochira
- Nindoo

== See also ==
- Rascalimu
- Black Prophet
