= Morris Babyface =

Ghanaian music producer

Marx Morris Twumasi (born 21 January 1980), known as Morris Babyface or Morris D’Voice Lovit is a Ghanaian music producer, singer and songwriter who hails from the Ashanti Region of Ghana. Morris is known to have recorded most prominent artist in Ghana with the likes of Pat Thomas, Kojo Antwi, Obour, Ofori Amponsah, A. B. Crentstil, Kontihene, Okomfoo Kwadee, Esther Smith, Nana Ama, Obrafour, Lord Kenya etc.

== Life and career ==
Morris Babyface was born to the native palm-wine guitarist Kofi Twumasi of the Koo Nimo and his Adadammu fame. He is the senior brother of another legendary Ghanaian producer and Musician Roro Buddy whom he introduced into production. He has won the Ghana Music Awards' Best sound engineer twice and he is revered as one of the best keyboardist in Ghana.
