= Rascalimu =

Ghanaian-born American reggae musician

- Born: Carlos Alidu Mumuni; Tamale
- Genres: Reggae

Rascalimu (born Carlos Alidu Mumuni) is a Ghanaian-born American reggae musician.

== See also ==
- Sheriff Ghale
