= Teachers in Islam =

There are many concepts of teachers in Islam. Islam does not have an explicit hierarchy, thus the concepts and names for spiritual teachers and secular functions are often mixed and easily confused. A list of terms used in various Islamic traditions follows:

- The Marja is a label used by the Shia community, meaning source to follow.
- The most respected of the Marjas are entitled Allamah. This Persian name for teacher is also used by some Sunnis to denote a teacher of extraordinary respect.
- Ulema/Ulama is the title that indicates that the teacher has come to awareness of the consensus, the ijma, of the Umma. Umma is the universal community of all the followers of God as understood by the Muslim community (cf. Sangha, Ecclesia)
- Mufti is a someone who interprets or expounds Islamic law (Sharia and fiqh)
- Muhaddith is someone who has profound knowledge of the Haddith, and teaches by Narration, or storytelling.
- Hend is often the title of the teachers at the Madrasahs, Islamic schools. Mullah is a teacher in regard of being respected as a vicar and guardian of Qur'an and the Islamic traditions.
- Mawlawi is a Persian word for teacher meaning Master.
- Sheikh is sheikh is an Arabic honorific term that literally means Elder. It is a long historic debate in many cultures whether the elder in itself denotes the role and status of a teacher.
- Shaykh is the authenticated Quran teacher.
- Ayatollah is a high ranking title given to Shi'a clerics.
- Mujaddid is someone who is sent by God to aid the Umma and revive Islam at the beginning of every century.
- Marabout is a spiritual teacher of Islam as it is taught in the West Africa and Maghreb, The word comes from the Berber concept of Saint. The "marabout" is known as "Sayyed" (سيد) to the Arabic speaking Maghribians.
