= Akwaboah Jnr =

Ghanaian musician

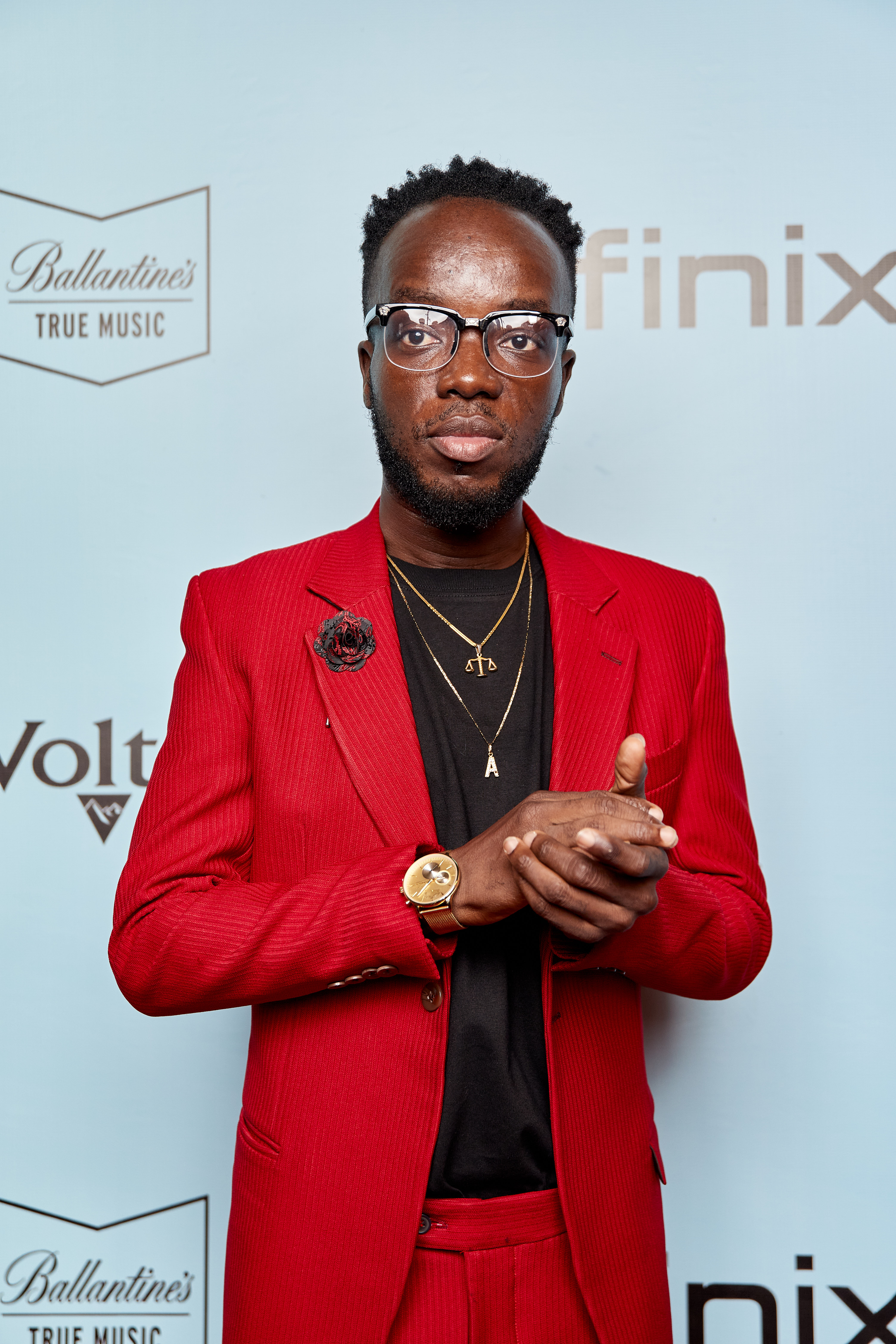

Background information
- Born: Gladstorm Kwabena Akwaboah Jnr. Mampong Beposo, Ghana
- Genres: Highlife, Hiplife
- Occupations: Singer, song-writer
- Years active: 2007–present
- Label: Sarkcess Music

Gladstorm Kwabena Akwaboah Jnr., known by his stage name Akwaboah Jnr., is a Ghanaian singer-songwriter and producer from Mampong Beposo. He is the son of highlife musician Kwadwo Akwaboah. He wrote "Daa Ke Daa" for Becca and "Ayeyi Ndwom" for DSP Kofi Sarpong. Both songs won their respective artistes' awards at the 2010 Ghana Music Awards, with Akwaboah subsequently being adjudged the "Song Writer for the Year" for "Daa Ke Daa".

Akwaboah, who is a master keyboardist, has played for a lot of local and international artistes including Hugh Masekela and John Legend. Akwaboah was signed unto Sarkcess music, a record label owned by Sarkodie. Akwaboah also produced and co-wrote Sarkodie's fourth album "Mary".

== Career ==
Having hailed from a family of musicians, Akwaboah Jnr. started his music career in his early teenage years. However, he first made headlines in 2009 when the songs that he had written, Ayeyi Ndwom for DSP Kofi Sarpong and Daa Ke Daa for Becca, won their respective artiste awards at the 2010 Ghana Music Awards. In the same year, Akwaboah Jnr. won the songwriter of the year award for the Daa Ke Daa song. Aside from being a songwriter, Akwaboah also serves as a judge on a popular Kid's program dubbed "Nsromma". Being a master keyboardist, Akwaboah Jnr. has had the honor of playing for both local and international artistes such as John Legend.

== Personal life ==
Akwaboah is married to Theresa Akwaboah; the event was held on 3 May 2024 in Accra.

== Discography ==
=== Studio album ===
- Matters of the Heart (2018)

== Annual concert ==
Akwaboah hosts the shades of love concert every year on February 14.

- Shades of Love 2019
- Shades of Love 2020

== Awards and nominations ==
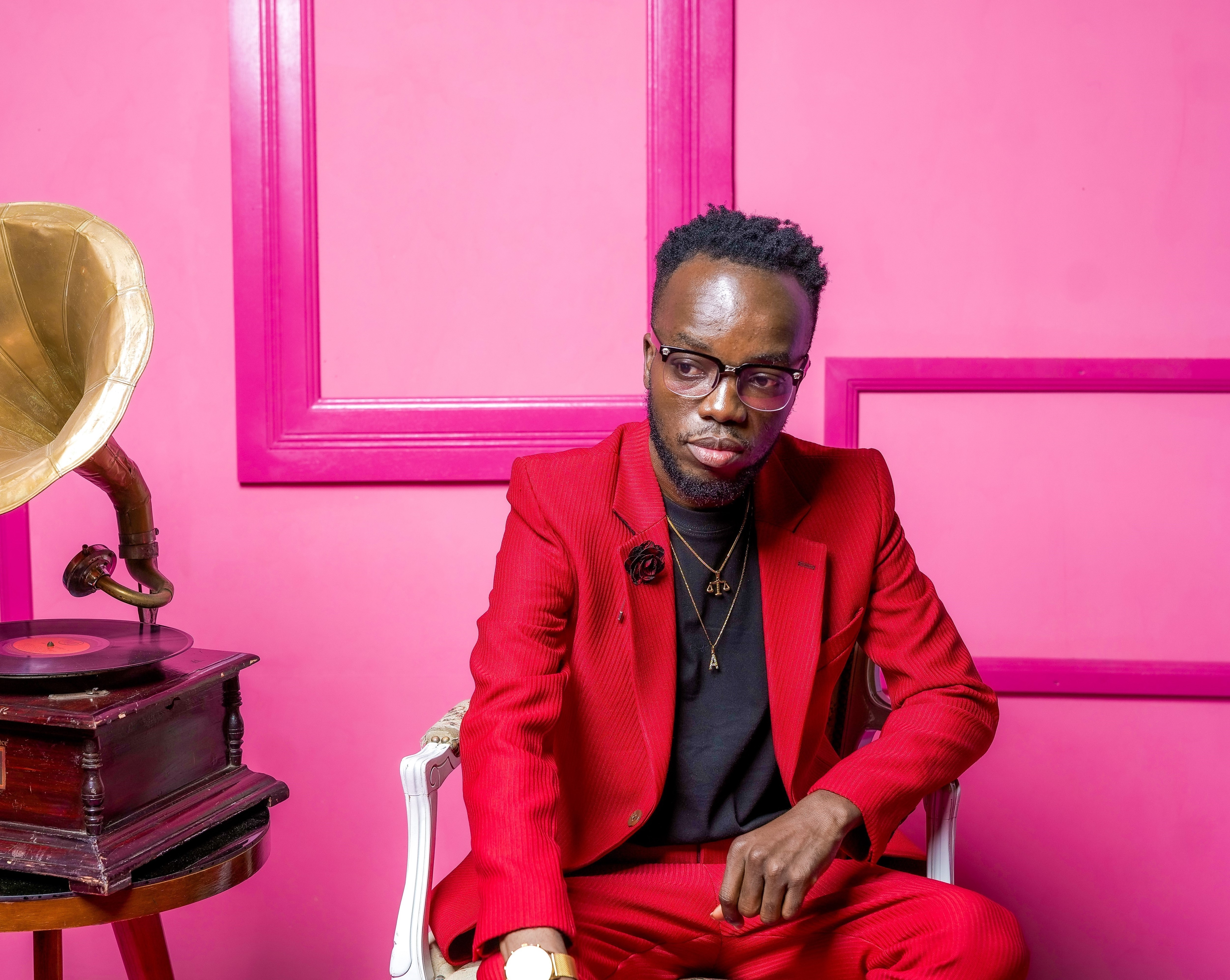
Akwaboah posing on the drip carpet at 3Music Awards 2022

=== Ghana Music Awards ===
Year	Nominee / work	Award	Result
2016	Himself	Best Male Vocal Performance	Nominated
2016	"Mewu" (Sarkodie featuring Akwaboah)	Best Collaboration of the Year	Nominated
2014	Himself	New Artist of the Year	Nominated
2013	Himself	Songwriter of the Year	Nominated
2010	Himself	Songwriter of the Year	Won

Highlife Song of the Year – 2019 Highlife Music Awards

Nominated for the Male Vocalist of the Year at the 2021 Vodafone Ghana Music Awards with his song 'Posti Me'
