= Alfa (title) =

Title of respect in Guinea

Alfa ou Alpha is a title given to distinguished figures in Guinea, particularly in the Kankan Region. It has become known in Guinea as a title of respect, especially amongst the Maninka and Fulbé and is commonly given to scholars and learned and religious military leaders.
