= Joe Beecham =

Ghanaian gospel musician

- Born: October 15; Sekondi-Takoradi, Ghana
- Origin: Ghana
- Genres: Gospel, Urban contemporary gospel
- Occupations: Singer, song writer
- Instrument: Vocals
- Years active: (1998–present)

Joe Beecham is a Ghanaian gospel singer, songwriter, choir master and a pastor at the Holy Fire Ministries in Takoradi.

== Early life and education ==
Joe Beecham was born in Sekondi-Takoradi, Ghana. He had his secondary education at St. John's School, Sekondi and afterwards proceeded to study at the Takoradi Technical University in the Western region of Ghana. He then pursued God's call to ministry.

== Music career ==
He entered the music scene in 1998 with the release of his first album, 'M'asem bi' and subsequently releasing four more albums.

=== Joe Beecham and the "Spirit of One" ===
Spirit of One was a Takoradi-based group then headed by Rev. Charlie Sam. They embarked on ministrations in schools, winning souls in the Western Region and its environs. They were also invited to minister in churches, at conferences and programmes.

Beecham worked with the group for years. The 'M'asem bi' album which was released in 1998, was backed by the Spirit of One group and had most hit songs including; ‘M’asem bi' [Asem bia mi kakyere wo], 'Se Me kae a' which gained massive airplay in the country.

=== Work ===
Beecham is a pastor and a choir leader at the Holy Fire Ministries in Takoradi. He has ministered to various congregations in most regions of Ghana and ministered internationally in Germany, the Netherlands, UK, USA and Italy.

On March 4, 2015, Beecham officially launched his ministry, "Joe Beecham Ministries" after years of hibernation in the music industry. The "Joe Beecham Ministries" (JBM) aims to "carry the message of hope and righteousness to humanity, and to affect our generation positively through anointed music and worship." organizing young people to reach out to the villages to spread the word through praise-and-worship workshops.

== Personal life ==
Beecham is married to Rita Beecham. He is the eighth and last child of his parents.

== Discography ==
=== Albums ===
Title	Album details
M’asem Bi	Release year: 1998
Egya Fa Kye hen	Release year: 2000
Mber Yi	Release year: 2002
Alone with God	Release year: 2006
Preachers Voice	Release year: 2009
Let the Fire Fall	Release year: 2016

=== Major Singles ===
- "Wo Ye Nyame"
- "Let the Fire Fall"
- "Okatamodo"
- "Meda w'ase"
- "M'asesa"
- "Bisa Ewurade"
- "Dabi [Medley]"
- "Sam yare"
- "I must desire"
- "Egya Fakye me"
- "Reflections"
- "Mbre Yi"
- "The Prayer Song"
- "Ao Yesu"
- "Se Mekae a"
- "Masem Bi"

== Awards ==
Joe Beecham has received several awards in his ministry including winning the first "New Artist of the Year" award during the maiden edition of the Ghana Music Awards in 1998 with the hit song "Asɛm bia me kakyirɛ wo".
