= Terry Bonchaka =

Ghanaian hiplife artist (1982 - 2003)

- Born: Terrence Nii Okang Mensah Adjetey'; March 23, 1982; Ghana
- Origin: Ghana
- Died: October 30, 2003 (aged 21)
- Genre: Hiplife
- Occupation: Musician
- Years active: 2001–2003

Terry Bonchaka (23 March 1982 – 29 October 2003) was a Ghanaian hiplife artist. His music was enjoyed across the country and he left a legacy behind with his Pulele hit song.

== Education ==
He had his basic education at Ewit Greenwich Classical Academy and secondary education at Adisadel College.

== Discography ==
List of songs over the period.

- Lomna Va
- Ghana Lady
- Pulele
- Ewurade
- I am Aware
- Asem Ben Ni
- Chichinappi

== Death ==
He died in a car accident while returning from a performance at a Hall week celebration that was held at Akuafo Hall University of Ghana. He was 21 years old.
