= Arrests of 21 Ghanaian LGBT+ activists =

Event in Ghana in May 2021

Arrest of 21 activists
- Date: 21 May – 11 June 2021
- Duration: 21 Days
- Venue: Ho Circuit Court
- Location: Ho, Volta Region
- Also known as: HO 21
- Cause: False accusation of a gathering by some Ghanaian youth to promote LGBTIQ activities in the society.
- Participants: 21
- Charges: Unlawful Assembly

On 20 May 2021, 21 LGBT rights activists in Ghana were arrested at a hotel in Ho, Ho Municipal District, during an assembly where the activists were discussing human rights treatment of LGBT+ people in the country. The arrests sparked international condemnation and the rise of a movement under the banner #ReleaseThe21 calling for their release and an end to state violence against the Ghanaian LGBT+ community. In the most recent court hearing, on 11 June 2021, the activists were granted bail on their fourth application. The case was dropped on 5 August 2021 on the basis of lack of evidence on the charge of unlawful assembly.

== Background ==
Homosexuality is illegal in many parts of Africa, and in Ghana, it has been criminalized since the 1860s. Although LGBT organizations exist, they are only allowed to discuss human rights but not promote or practice gay sex, which is punishable with up to three years' imprisonment.

In February 2021, a community center for the LGBT community had to close its doors amidst mounting pressure by religious groups and anti-gay organizations against sexual minorities. Actor Idris Elba along with British Vogue editor-in-chief Edward Enninful and model Naomi Campbell signed an open letter to the government of Ghana to address discrimination and legalize homosexuality in Ghana.

LGBT+ issues are often seen as part of a Western agenda trying to spread US or European values in the country, which has led to high levels of discrimination against LGBT+ people, including blackmail, extortion, and violent attacks.

In April 2018, President Nana Akufo-Addo, had to clarify statements made to news outlet Al Jazeera about gay rights in the country and after opposition party National Democratic Congress (NDC) asked him to clarify his stance, one of his office spokesmen said that the President would not be willing to legalize gay sex in Ghana and that there would be no changes to existing laws.

After the Accra LGBT center had to close, many Black celebrities showed sympathy to the Ghanaian gay community; among them actors Idris Elba and Michaela Coel and signed a letter under the hashtag #GhanaSupportsEquality. Human Rights Watch also condemned the raid and closure of the center. However, members of the organization such as Alex Kofi Donkor and others of LGBT+ Rights Ghana, have stated that they will not flee or leave Ghana and that they will continue for rights recognitions. Donkor stated that authorities had further limited their activities to only "health related" programs. Donkor also said that whilst mixed, the reaction of Ghanaians to the LGBT+ were not openly against them. Donkor also thanked singer Boy George for releasing a song in support of the gay Ghanaian community and he said that it is "heartwarming to see all this support" coming from the international community.

Following these statements made by Donkor, a group of MPs led by NDC's Sam Nartey George said that they would push along with other lawmakers to criminalize the promotion of LGBTQ+ rights. George wrote on social media that it was owed to the Ghanaian people to uphold "that which gives us identity as people" and asked for help to fight the "scourge and perversion that homosexuality presents". In response, LGBT+ Rights Ghana urged President Akufo-Addo to guarantee peace and safety for gay people in Ghana and that it was not within the organization's goals to legalize same-sex civil unions.

== Arrests and court proceedings ==
On 20 May 2021, a group of LGBT+ rights advocates (16 women and five men) held a meeting in the city of Ho in the southeastern Volta Region of Ghana. Meeting at a hotel for nurses and midwives, the group had met to share information on documenting LGBT+ rights violations in Ghana and had brought a number of flyers with them, including ones on "Coming out" and "All about Trans."

Shortly after the meeting began, police raided the hotel and arrested them under the anti-homosexuality laws, unlawful assembly and promoting LGBTQ+ agenda. This was seen as the latest crackdown on LGBT individuals in the country and the arrests were widely condemned as there are no legal parameters to forbid the assembly to discuss improvement of living LGBT+ people, according to organization Rightify Ghana, which also accused, along with an academic, of depriving the activists arrested, access to legal counseling.

Soon after the arrests, the hashtag #ReleaseThe21 went viral on Twitter in the country but the petition by an LGBT organization before the Ho City Circuit Court to immediately release them was refused.

The Ho City Police Department released a statement saying that the activists arrested "were advocating for LGBTQI activities" and further stated that "The command is cautioning the public, particularly parents, to be wary of activities of persons involved in this misbehavior and report them to the police".

They were first set to appear in court on 4 June 2021, where the charges against them were read and delayed their bail application for a few days. The activists' lawyers pointed that promoting LGBT rights is not a crime in Ghana. On 8 June 2021, the Ho City Court denied bail to all 21 activists and ordered the next hearing on the case for 16 June. One of the activists' lawyers, Julia Selman Ayetey, did not elaborate on why they were denied bail by the Ho City High Court and anticipated that they had already filed for the Circuit Court.

On 11 June 2021, the activists were released on an almost USD900 bail and their case is expected to resume on a later date.

On 16 June 2021, Circuit Court Judge Felix Datsomor granted the state prosecutor a postponement for further advice and instruction due to the case being stranded at the attorney general's jurisdiction.

On 5 August 2021, a court dropped the case for lack of evidence on the charges of unlawful assembly and cleared the 21 activists of further prosecution.

=== State sued for constitutional rights abuse ===
On June 14 2022, 4 out of the 21 activists previously detained for "unlawful assembly" filed a lawsuit against the Inspector General of Police and the Attorney General of Ghana for their unlawful arrest and detention. The activists were backed by Queer Ghana Education Fund (QuGEF) and the Coalition for SupportGH amongst other LGBTI+ organizations.

== Reactions ==
The United Nations strongly condemned the "arbitrary detention" of the activists and asked for their release through their departments of discriminations against LGBT+ people and arbitrary detentions. In its words of condemnation for the alleged arbitrary detainment and petition to respect the rights of LGBT+ people, the UN added and urged "The Government of Ghana (must) release them immediately and unconditionally."

The United States State Department also condemned the arrests and called on the government of Ghana to "uphold constitutional human rights protections" and called on all Ghanaians to respect the provisions under Ghana’s constitution that guarantee freedom of speech, expression, and peaceful assembly.

The European Union and aid donors to Ghana also asked the country for the immediate release of the activists and to respect their human rights and right of free assembly.

The World Bank and the news agency Thomson Reuters among other donors of aid to Ghana, asked the authorities to respect the rights of the activists and also called for their immediate release. The donors further stated that they were "closely monitoring (and) watching the developing situation".

After the bail was granted, Human Rights Watch urged the general prosecutor of Ghana to drop the charges against the 21 activists, saying that the case is a "stain on Ghana's reputation".

== See also ==
- Freedom of assembly
- Freedom of association
- Freedom of speech
- Ghanaian anti-LGBTQ bill
- Human rights in Ghana
- LGBTQ rights in Ghana
- Right to privacy
