= Coz Ov Moni 2 =

Coz Ov Moni 2 (FOKN Revenge)
- Directed by: King Luu
- Written by: FOKN BOIS
- Produced by: Panji Anoff
- Starring: Mensa Ansah; Emmanuel Owusu-Bonsu; Yaa Pono; Efya; Mutombo Da Poet; Macho Rapper; Simpol Tingz; Sister Deborah; Pope Skinny; Bryte; Awal; Hogof Theater; Kwame Appah; Moskito; Kwame Partan; Tilapia
- Edited by: King Luu
- Distributed by: Pidgen Music / Luu Vision
- Release date: 2013
- Running time: 63 minutes
- Country: Ghana
- Language: Pidgin English

Coz Ov Moni 2 (FOKN Revenge) - The World's 2nd 1st Pidgin Musical is a 2013 musical film produced by the FOKN BOIS and directed by independent Ghanaian filmmaker King Luu.

The film is a musical entirely spoken in Ghanaian Pidgin English, but subtitles are shown.

== Cast ==
- M3NSA
- Wanlov the Kubolor
- Yaa Pono
- Efya
- Mutombo Da Poet
- Macho Rapper
- Simpol Tingz
- Sister Deborah
- Pope Skinny
- Bryte
- Awal
- Hogof Theater
- Kwame Appah
- Moskito
- Kwame Partan
- Tilapia

== Release ==
The film premiered in Ghana on 23 December 2013 at Ghana's National Theatre in Accra, premiered in the United States on 21 February 2014 at Cantina Royale in New York City and in the United Kingdom on 24 September 2014 at Hackney Attic in London. The film was also presented at various film festivals, including the Africa International Film Festival (Tinapa), Durban Film Festival (Durban), Norient Musikfilm Festival (Bern) and Fantastic Fest (Austin). It was subsequently released on DVD, with a free download of the Soundtrack for every purchased copy of the movie.

== See also ==
- Coz Ov Moni (2010), The prequel
