= National Coalition for Proper Human Sexual Rights and Family Values =

The National Coalition for Proper Human Sexual Rights and Family Values is a Ghanaian anti-LGBT advocacy group. The group has advocated for conversion therapy, a practice that the scientific consensus has found is pseudoscientific and that has been described by the UN and the International Rehabilitation Council for Torture Victims as torture.

== Activities ==
=== Conversion therapy ===
In summer 2018, the group organised a conference titled "Exploring the myths surrounding LGBT rights," at which it claimed around 400 people had signed up to "undergo counselling after a sexual evangelism programme." At the conference, the group also stated its intention to set up a conversion therapy unit at the Korle-Bu Teaching Hospital and claimed that a recent speech given by British Prime Minister Theresa May in support of LGBT+ rights was part of a conspiracy to reduce the African population.

In July 2022, the group organised a workshop in Accra in which members of the Ghana Registered Nurses Association were presented with disinformation about LGBT+ health, including the promotion of conversion therapy.

=== Lobbying ===
In autumn 2019, the group successfully lobbied against the introduction of comprehensive sex education into the Ghanaian curriculum, arguing that it represented a plot to brainwash Ghanaians.

In mid-2021, the group lobbied in favour of the Ghanaian anti-LGBT bill. As part of its lobbying for the bill, the group's secretary-general Moses Foh-Amoaning stated that LGBT+ people who refuse to submit to conversion therapy "should be put in jail."

In May 2022, the group partnered with Advocates of Christ Ghana to launch a campaign aimed at appropriating the rainbow flag. Foh-Amoaning claimed that anyone who uses the flag to show support for LGBT+ rights "will be a target of the holy spirit, you will speak in tongues, the power of god will come after you."

=== Links to international hate groups ===
In 2019, the group collaborated with the American World Congress of Families, which has been designated an anti-LGBT hate group by the Southern Poverty Law Center. Together, they held a conference in Accra calling for the Ghanaian government to declare the country a "no-go area for the LGBT agenda", similar to the LGBT-free zones in Poland, and called for the creation of teams to design legal attacks on LGBT+ rights in Ghana. At the conference, presentations were also given that denounced abortion and women’s empowerment.

== Reception ==
Human rights organisation Rightify Ghana has described the Coalition as having "religious fundamentalist views and ideologies." LGBT+ rights organisation LGBT+ Rights Ghana has described the Coalition as aiming "to sow discord and incite violence against an oppressed minority group." Human Rights Watch has stated that the Coalition is composed of "elite members across the political, religious, cultural and academic sectors" and has "actively propagated hate speech against LGBTI people in the media."

== See also ==
- LGBT rights in Ghana
