= Deborah Owusu-Bonsu =

Ghanaian TV personality and musician

- Born: Deborah Vanessa Owusu-Bonsu; 1984 (age 41–42)
- Other names: Sister Derby, Sister Deborah, Deborah Vanessa
- Education: Wesley Girls' High School; Kwame Nkrumah University of Science and Technology (Bachelor's Degree); University of the Arts London (Master Degree)
- Occupations: Television presenter, model, musician
- Years active: 1994–present

Deborah Owusu-Bonsu (born 1984) better known by her stage name as Sister Derby or Sister Deborah is a Ghanaian television presenter, musician and model of Akan origin and a former presenter at e.tv Ghana.

== Early life and education ==
Deborah Vanessa Owusu-Bonsu was born in 1984 to an Ashanti father and a Romanian mother. Both of her parents were collectors of world music and art. She is a television show host, model, musician, and graphic artist. Owusu-Bonsu is the sister of popular hip life musician Wanlov the Kubolor who starred in the film Coz Ov MDeborah oni. Owusu-Bonsu attended Christ the King International School, then Wesley Girls' High School. She graduated with a Bachelor's Degree in Publishing Studies from the Kwame Nkrumah University of Science and Technology followed by a Master Degree in Book/Journal Publishing from the University of the Arts London.

== Professional career ==
In 2012, Owusu-Bonsu recorded and released a single (music) entitled 'Uncle Obama' referring to Barack Obama in which was covered by United States television network CNN. Owusu-Bonsu began hosting The Late Nite Celebrity Show program broadcast by television network e.tv Ghana that same year. She later moved to GHOne Television where she hosted Gliterrati for a brief period before handing over to Berla Mundi.

=== Ghana Jollof ===
West Africans often dispute amongst themselves about whose Jollof rice is better in the so-called Jollof Wars, a competition which is especially prominent between Nigeria and Ghana. In 2016 Owusu-Bonsu released "Ghana Jollof", which poked fun at the Nigerian version and at Nigerians for being proud of their version.

== Personal life ==
She dated rapper Medikal for three years, before breaking up in 2018.

== Activism ==
Owusu-Bonsu has been actively involved in sanitation and recycling campaigns using her music. In 2018, she made a call on the government of Ghana to ban the use of plastic bags. In 2020, during the COVID-19 pandemic, she and her brother (Wanlov the Kubolor) made nosemasks from recycled secondhand clothing to help reduce clothing waste from dumpsites and the sea.

Owusu-Bonsu has also been vocal about the rights of LGBT+ individuals in Ghana. In 2021, she spoke against the Ghanaian anti-LGBT bill and the shutting down of the LGBT+ Rights Ghana office. She also featured on Angel Maxine's Kill The Bill and Wo Fie, which used music to advocate for the rights of LGBT+ individuals in Ghana.

== Discography ==
=== Singles ===
Year	Title	Artist
2012	Uncle Obama	Sister Deborah ft (FOKN Bois)
2015	Kikoliko	Sister Deborah ft (Joey B)
2016	Ghana Jollof	Sister Deborah
2017	Sampanana	Sister Deborah ft (Medikal)
2018	Pure Water	Sister Deborah ft (Efya)
2018	Kakalika Love	Sister Deborah ft (Efo Chameleon)
2019	Libilibi	Sister Deborah ft (Yaa Pono)
