= Ko-Jo Cue =

Ghanaian rapper

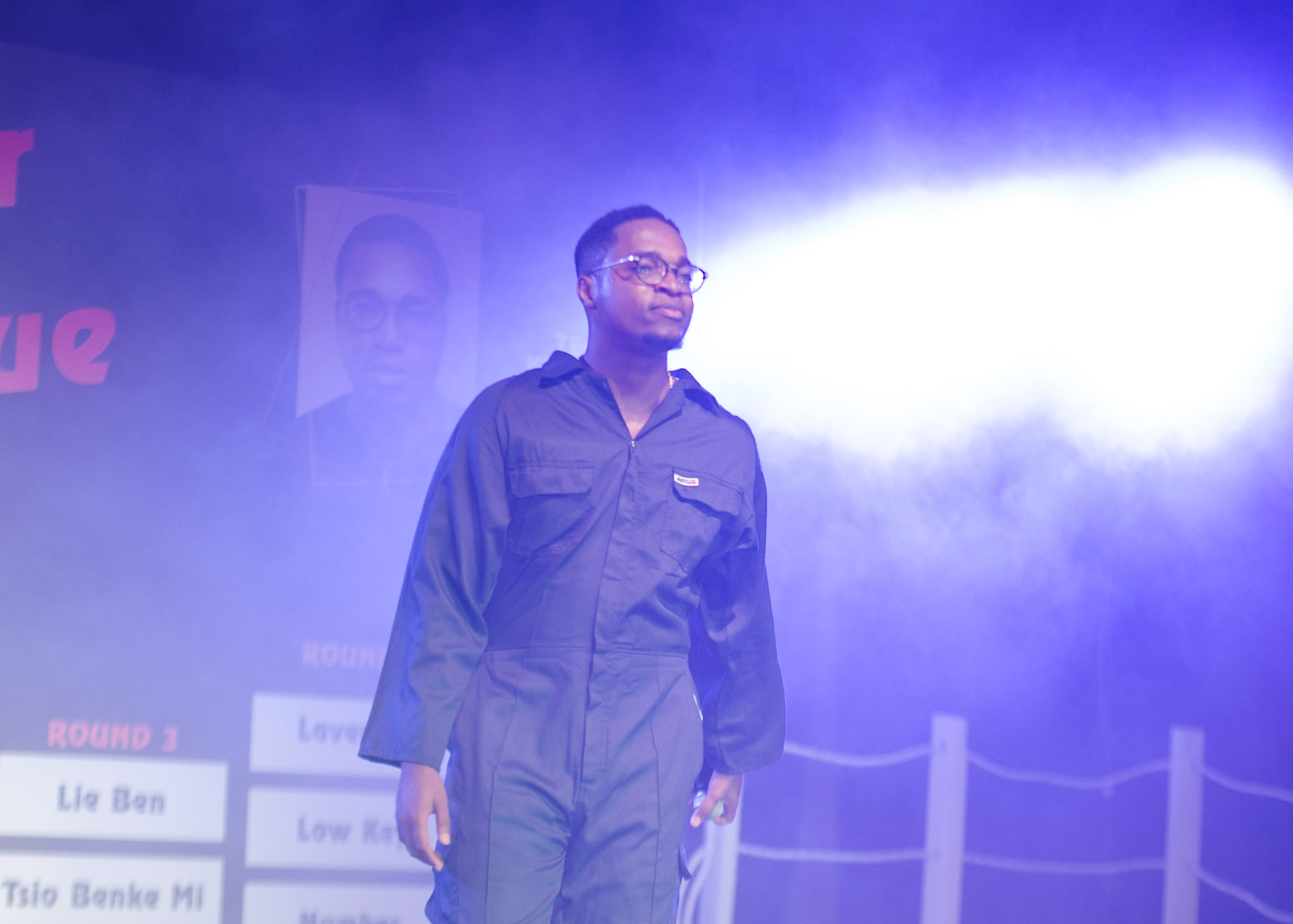
- Ko-Jo Cue performs at Alliance Francais

Background information
- Also known as: Young Daddy Lumba, PLK
- Born: Linford Kennedy Amankwaa; 27 May 1989 (age 37); Adum, Kumasi, Ghana
- Genres: Hiplife, Hip Hop, Afro-Pop, Afro-Fusion, Afrobeats
- Occupations: Rapper, Singer, songwriter, journalist
- Years active: 2010–present
- Label: BBnZ Live
- Website: www.kingcue.com

Linford Kennedy Amankwaa (born 27 May 1989), known by his stage name Ko-Jo Cue, is a Ghanaian Hip-Hop/Afro-Pop artiste from Kumasi, Ashanti Region.

== 1989–2009: Early life and musical beginnings ==
Amankwaa was born in Adum, a suburb of Kumasi, but he was mainly raised by his grandmother in Bantama, another suburb of Kumasi. Growing up in a house filled with his entire extended family and sleeping in a room with 5 cousins, an auntie and his grandmother, the values of family were instilled in him at an early age. These values are shared in most of his songs. At age 9, he fell in love with Ghanaian rap music when his cousin Rebel [who was an amateur dancehall artiste] introduced him to Obrafour's first album Pae Mu Ka. He wrote the lyrics to a particular track (Aden) down and learned to recite it over time. After succeeding, he decided to start writing his own rhymes as a means to escape his surroundings and share his thoughts with the world. In 2005, he gained admission to the Kumasi Anglican High School, which is famous for being the alma mater of musicians such as Okyeame Kwame, Lord Kenya and Noble Nketiah. It was here that he started seriously considering music as a career path. In 2008, he met two aspiring musicians, K-Wu and Kuul D (together known as Soulbrothaz), who introduced him to Macfancy, a 3rd year pharmacy student at KNUST who made beats in his spare time. The two hooked up and started recording in a bedroom studio owned by a fellow Nigerian student called Okechukwu, known as Drillmeister. Macfancy would produce instrumentals and mix the recordings afterwards. The two will go on to record over 10 songs (some of which made it onto his first mixtape), and Ko-Jo, operating under the name Jazzy Flo posted the songs on his Facebook and Reverbnation page, attracting the attention of Tallal Sangari, the C.E.O of Primitive Music, who offered the young upstart a deal. Under the guidance of Tallal Sangari, known as Tee, Ko-Jo Cue adopted his new moniker and started a journey to discover himself as an artist, beginning with the release of his first mixtape.

== Musical career ==
=== 2010–2011 Growing Pain ===
In January 2010, Ko-Jo Cue released the first installment in a series he called ‘Growing Pains’. The project,b ‘N.A.T.H.A.N,’ attracted the attention of the online community on Facebook as well as the major Ghanaian blogs and websites, most notable among them being Ghana Mixtapes and BigXGh. It was the first project of its kind by a Kumasi artiste, and it gained him regional recognition. Within the space of three months, he added two more installments, ‘N.O.N.A’ and ‘Now And Forever,’ with the latter earning him respect amongst the Ghanaian Hip-Hop community and the former spawning his first viral hit with a track titled ‘Head Nod’ produced by Peewee. The song made it onto radio rotation in his hometown and even caught the attention of Bradez and Okyeame Kwame (two of the biggest acts from his hometown at that time). He then took 2 more months to release the last instalment in the series, which he titled ‘The Wait’. The buzz generated by ‘Head Nod’ attracted artists out of his region, and soon he found himself working with acts like Kay-Ara, Klu, and Pappykojo. He also worked on a cover of Kwaw Kesse's ‘Poppin’ with Flowking Stone (one half of the Bradez). He kept his visual appearances minimal but managed to gather quite a cult following, which expanded as he collaborated with more artistes outside his region.

=== 2011–2012 Before We Shine ===
In January 2011, Ko-Jo Cue released Before We Shine and solidified his status as an underground king and earned a spot as one of Kumasi's top 5 rappers. The project earned him two viral hits with the songs ‘My Life’ (which earned rotation on DW radio) and the fan favourite ‘E No Be Say’. He performed at the maiden edition of the Asabaako Music Festival, which featured acts like Yaa Pono and Wanlov. He was also brought on-stage by Flowking Stone at a Vodafone street carnival in Asokwa-Kumasi. In March 2012, he released ‘Winning’ as the first single for the second instalment of Before We Shine. The song, which was produced by Klu, became the leading trending topic on Ghanaian Twitter for four hours, earning over 3,000 downloads in a week. It also received rotation on YFM. In June 2012, he released his first visual for the single titled ‘The Flood’. The video was directed by Jeneral Jay and received rotation on various national television stations, eventually landing on Channel O. In October 2012, he released another single titled ‘Lie Ben’ which featured Asem to commercial acclaim. The song served as his first nationally recognized song, surpassing ‘Head Nod’ and ‘Winning’ in downloads and radio rotation. He also announced the release date for the second installment of Before We Shine.

=== 2013 Before We Shine 2 ===
In January 2013, almost a year after the release of its first single, Ko-Jo Cue released the sequel ‘Before We Shine 2: The Cremation of Care’ to critical praise. The mixtape, which had 16 tracks (plus 2 bonus tracks), also featured artistes like Flowking Stone (Bradez), Edi-Young, Klu, Cabum, Kay-Ara and Trix. Production duties were handled by Klu, Kid Ziggy, Kuvie, Alberto, Cabum and Peewee. The buzz generated by the mixtape led to him being covered by most of the major Ghanaian entertainment newspapers. The ‘Communicator’ dubbed him ‘A Star in the making’ whilst the ‘Business & Financial Times Weekend’ called him ‘the voice of the new generation’. News One and Graphic Showbiz also covered the young upstart, enabling him to reach a wider audience. The media coverage didn't end there, as the video for the second single of the mixtape ‘Aden Koraa’ received regular rotation on the major television stations in Ghana. He was interviewed on Rapcity for GTV and appeared on ‘The DJ Black Cypher’ which aired on Viasat 1.

=== 2014 Corolla Music, BBnZ Live & The Shining ===
In April, he released a single called Corolla Music, it went viral, sparking a conversation about local hip-hop on YFM. The success of the song caught the attention of E.L who reached out to him so the two acts could collaborate. E.L also went an extra mile to secure a deal for him at BBnZ Live. In August, he released Low Key, the result of his collaboration with E.L and the single quickly became a favourite on radio playlists across the country. It also served as the first single to his then-anticipated mixtape The Shining. In September, he released The Shining as his first project on BBnZ Live. The project turned out to be more than a mixtape and felt more like a free album. It was downloaded more than 12000 times and earned critical praise from pundits and fans alike. Fellow artistes Wanlov, M3nsa, Dex Kwasi & M.anifest praised the project as one of the standouts of the year.

=== 2015 ===
==== Lavender ====
In July 2015, he released his biggest single to date, Lavender. The song, which featured his label mate E.L charted on 6 major radio stations. It was remixed by DJ Kess (the most famous Ghanaian female DJ), and he followed it with his first official video months later.

=== 2016–present ===
Ko-jo Cue recruited friend and StarBoy Worldwide singer Mr Eazi on "My Baybey" in June. Later in the year, he also teamed up with A. I am releasing "Tsioo Benke Mi," a world music(genre) record. These two records would go on to prove Ko-jo Cue as a versatile artist. On 10 December, MTVBase Africa, an international entertainment channel, listed Ko-jo Cue together with nine other Ghanaian acts in a Tweet as "the hottest MCs of the year." BMT Afrika, a Ghanaian urban, pop cultural platform, also placed Ko-jo Cue at number 10 on its Hottest MCs of 2016 list based on parameters including impact (year under review), lyrics, buzz, style and other factors that make them stand out from the crowd.

== Discography ==
=== Mixtapes and albums ===
Title	Year
Now and the Here-After Nigga (N.A.T.H.A.N)	2010
Now Or Never Again (N.O.N.A)	2010
Now and Forever	2010
The Wait	2010
Before We Shine	2011
Before We Shine 2	2013
The Shining	2014
Pen and Paper with Lil Shaker	2017
For My Brothers	2019
21 Memory Lane	2021
I'm Back	2023
Tontonte	2025
KANI: A Bantama Story	2025

=== Singles ===
Song title	Year
Head Nod	2010
Wining	2012
Lie Ben	2013
Corolla Music	2014
Low Key	2014
Lavender	2015
My Baybey (with Mr Eazi)	2016
Tsioo Benke Mi	2016
Asoɔden	2019
Island Love	2020
La Ti Do	2023
Free Throw	2023
001	2023
Abebrese	2025
Onipa Hia Mmoa	2025
