= Bra Kevin Beats =

Ghanaian musician

Kelvin Anom also known as Bra Kevin Beats in the entertainment space, is a Ghanaian rapper and known for the song Three Headed Beats and Riddle Riddle.

== Career ==
He was part of the Skillion group which was co-founded Jayso and T-Kube.The consisted of Joey B, Lil Shaker.

== Discography ==
- Wedding
- Nana Nyame
- Sit Up
- Pablo
- Mama Pray
- Three Headed Beast
- Riddle Riddle

== Awards ==
- He won two awards at the 4syte music awards in 2011
- He was nominated twice for the 2012 Vodafone Ghana Music Awards
