= Angel Maxine =

Ghanaian musician

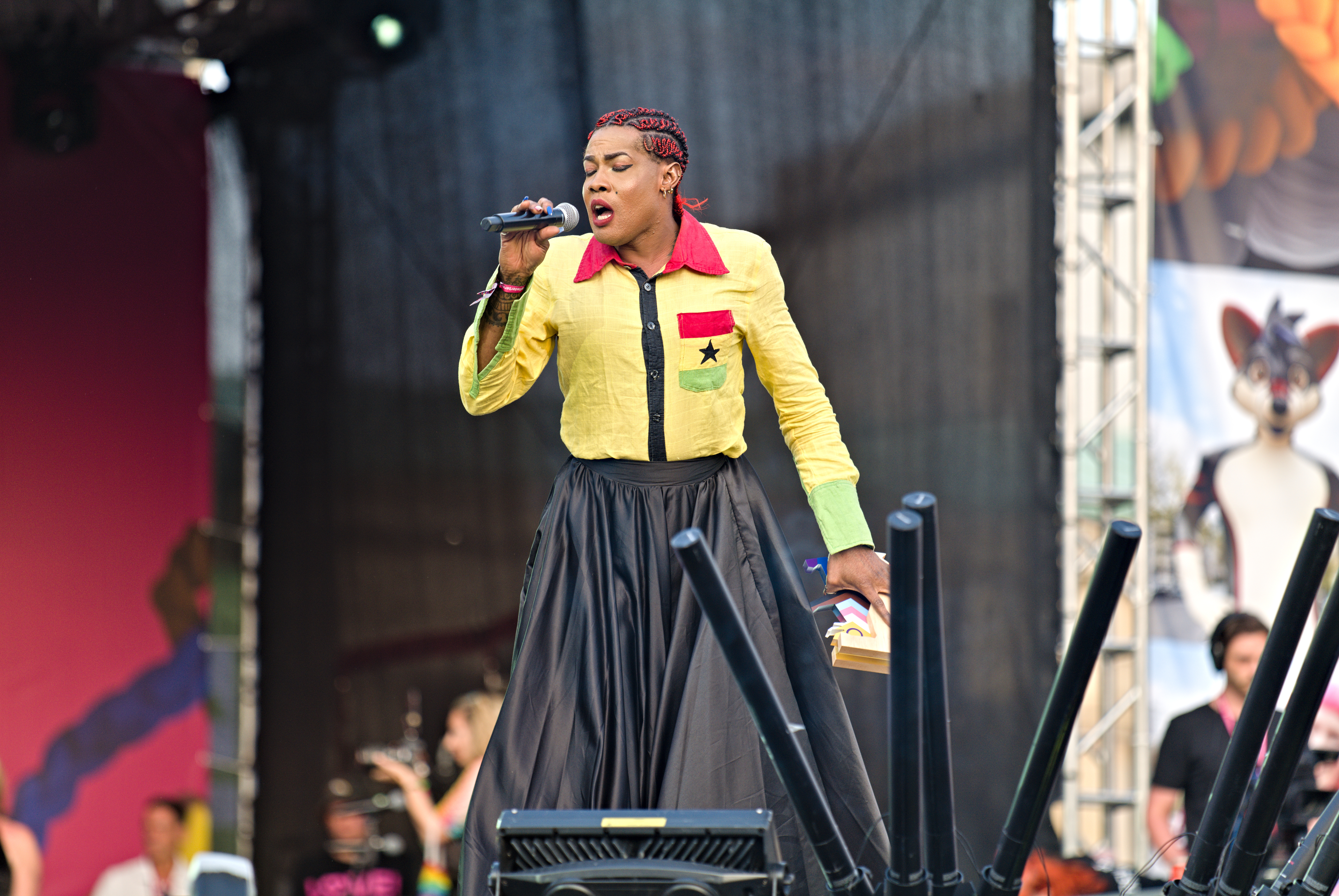
- Angel Maxine singing on the stage at the 2023 Christopher Street Day in Berlin after awarding the Soul of Stonewall Award.
- Education: University of Ghana
- Alma mater: Ghana Senior High School
- Known for: Musician, activist
- Movement: Activist for LGBT rights in Ghana

Angel Maxine Opoku is a Ghanaian musician. Maxine is known as the first openly transgender Ghanaian musician.

== Early life and education ==
Raised in the coastal city of Tema, Maxine says that her home was "deeply religious and musical" and was where she took to music at a young age. She attended the Ghana Secondary School in Koforidua for her senior high school education and later the University of Ghana for a food safety and nutrition degree. She later attended the Regional Maritime University. Angel grew up in the coastal city of Tema, as the daughter of a reverend and a prophetess.

== Music career ==
Angel started her music career in 2020 with her first single titled "Sweetness (D3d33d3)".

She released "Wo Fie" which featured Wanlov the Kubolor and Sister Deborah, whom she describes as "siblings, musicians, activists, and allies of the LGBTQ+ community." "Wo Fie", which means "your home," became a viral Pride Month hit in 2022. It became a number one trending video on TikTok.

Her song "Kill The Bill"", released in 2021, is a campaign song against the Ghanaian anti-LGBT+ bill.

Her latest single, titled "PrEP" is a song about a medication Pre-exposure prophylaxis for HIV prevention, which can be a preventative measure against contracting HIV. The song was released on 30 November 2022 to mark World AIDS Day and to help in the fight to end HIV/AIDS. In 2025, she released a new album titled "Kofi is a girl", telling how trans people in Ghana experience transphobia.

== Activism ==
Angel Maxine is an open advocate for LGBT+ rights in Ghana and has been vocal about her rejection of the proposed Ghanaian anti-LGBT bill which is before the Parliament of Ghana as of July 2022.

== Discography ==
=== Singles ===
Year	Title	Artist
2020	Sweetness (D3d33d3)	Angel Maxine
2021	Wo Fie	Angel Maxine, Wanlov the Kubolor and Sister Derby
2021	Kill The Bill	Angel Maxine featuring Wanlov the Kubolor and Sister Derby
2022	PrEP	Angel Maxine
2024	Trumu Scent	Angel Maxine feat Wanlov the Kubolor
