= Eudora Christina Dadson =

Ghanaian High Court Judge

Her Ladyship Justice Eudora Christina Dadson is a Justice of the High Court of Ghana and currently presides over the Human Rights Division of the High Court in Accra. She was appointed to the bench in December 2019. Prior to her appointment, she had served as Acting Deputy Registrar (Legal Services) at the Kwame Nkrumah University of Science and Technology (KNUST).

== Education ==
Justice Dadson obtained her Bachelor of Laws (LLB) degree from the University of Ghana. She proceeded to the Ghana School of Law where she earned her Barrister at Law professional certificate, which earnable her to qualify as a Barrister and Solicitor of the Supreme Court of Ghana. She later obtained her Master's degree in Development Policy and Planning from the KNUST.

== Career ==
She began her career in university administration at the Kwame Nkrumah University of Science and Technology in April 2010 as an Assistant Registrar. She had demonstrated exceptional competence and got promoted as a Senior Assistant Registrar in October 2010 where she served in the Legal and Welfare Service division. Her leadership qualities led to her appointment as Acting Deputy Registrar of the Legal and Welfare Services of the University in November 2016.

On December 17 2019, Former President Nana Addo Dankwa Akufo-Addo swore Mrs. Eudora Christiana Dadson into office as a Justice of the High Court of Ghana at Jubilee House. As a High Court Justice, she has presided over various divisions of the court, including the Family Law Division and currently the Human Rights Division in Accra.
