= IPappi =

Ghanaian record producer

- Born: Prince Fosu
- Origin: Kumasi, Ghana
- Occupations: Record producer, sound engineer
- Years active: 2007–present
- Publishers: Sony Music UK

Prince Fosu, professionally known as iPappi is a Ghanaian record producer and sound engineer who hails from Kumasi in the Ashanti region.

His major productions include "Ololo" by Stonebwoy featuring Teni and "Up and Awake" by Kojo Cue and Shaker featuring Kwesi Arthur.

== Early life and career ==
Prince Fosu is from Kuntenanse–Yaase in the Ashanti Region of Ghana. He began his music career in 2007 after deciding to pursue production professionally in his local community. He has secured a music publishing deal with Sony Music UK.
