= Henry Prempeh =

Henry Prempeh may refer to:

- Henry K. Prempeh (born 1912), Ghanaian judge
- Henry Kwasi Prempeh, professor of Law
