= Ghana Jollof =

Ghana Jollof can refer to:

- The style of jollof rice in Ghanaian cuisine
- "Ghana Jollof", a song about the Jollof Wars by Sister Deborah
