= Shaker (Lil Shaker) =

Ghanaian artist

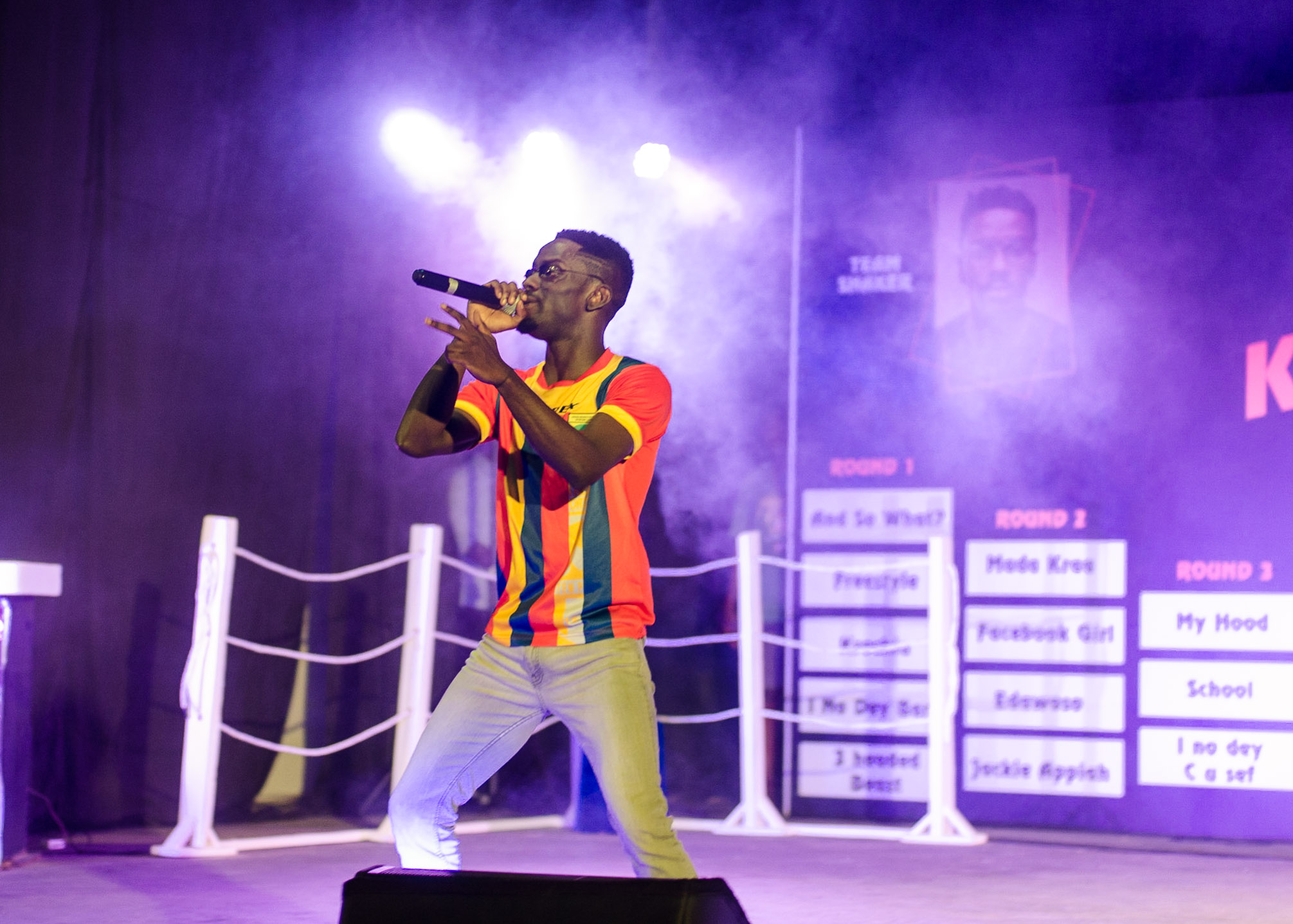
- Lil Shaker

Background information
- Born: Elikplim Yao Atiemo; Accra, Ghana
- Genres: Hip hop; RnB; afropop; Afrobeat
- Occupations: Recording artist; songwriter; Music Producer; performer
- Years active: 2004–present
- Labels: Current: BBnZ; Former: Skillions Records
- Website: www.bbnz-live.com

Elikplim Yao Atiemo (born in Accra, Ghana), better known by his stage name Shaker (Lil Shaker), is a Ghanaian recording artist, songwriter, producer and performer. He is currently signed to Ghana's biggest record label and multimedia company, BBnZ Live which also have artist like EL. He has hits like ‘I No Dey See U Saf’ and ‘Madakraa’ and also produced Sarkodie ‘Talk Of Gh’ and ‘Lies’.

== Early life ==
Elikplim Yao Atiemo was born in Accra, the capital of Ghana to Ghanaian parents and natives of the Volta Region. He started his musical career at age 15. He is currently signed to Ghana's biggest record label and multimedia company, BBnZ Live.

== Collaborations and influences ==
Shaker, has collaborated with artistes such as Sarkodie, EL, Raquel, Wanlov the Kubolor, Edem, Gemini and many others.

== Discography ==
=== Studio albums ===
- Burning Schedule
- Captain Hook
- Shaker

=== Major singles ===
- I no dey see u Sef featuring Sarkodie, Joey B, Raquel, Edem & Kevin Beats Produced by 'Magnom
- Konkonsa featuring Stargo Produced by B2
- Pray featuring EL Produced by E.L
- Hello featuring EL and DJ Mic Smith Produced by E.L
- Fi featuring EL and Raquel Produced by MagNom
- Krochia featuring Medikal Produced by 'Essencebeats
- Superstar featuring EL Produced by 'Peeweezel
- Falaa featuring EL Produced by 'B2
- Kontihene featuring Sakoaba Produced by 'Kuvie
- Licki LickiProduced by 'Shaker
- All My Money featuring Edem Produced by 'Gee Mix
- Two Thoozing featuring Edem & Gemini Produced by 'Shaker
- Pepper featuring Sarkodie Produced by 'Shaker
- Me P3 Kwan featuring Sarkodie Produced by 'NshonaMuzick
- KpoliKpo + So E Dey Produced by 'B2
- Bring Your Body ft Joey B Produced by 'B2
- My Friend ft Wanlov, Gemini, & E.L Produced by 'B2
- Handkerchief ft KO-JO Cue Produced by 'Magnom
- Edawoso Produced by 'MOG Beatz

== Record ==
In October 2015, Shaker joined Ko-Jo Cue, Cwesi Oteng and E.L at BBNZ Live.
