= LGBTQ rights in Ghana =

- Ghana
- Legal status: Male illegal since 1892 (as Gold Coast); Female de facto legal
- Penalty: Up to 3 years' imprisonment
- Gender identity: No
- Military: No
- Discrimination protections: No

Family rights
- Recognition of relationships: No recognition of same-sex unions
- Adoption: No

Lesbian, gay, bisexual, and transgender (LGBTQ) people in Ghana face significant challenges not experienced by non-LGBTQ residents. Sexual acts between males have been illegal as "unnatural carnal knowledge" in Ghana since the colonial era. The majority of Ghana's population hold anti-LGBTQ sentiments. Physical and violent homophobic attacks against LGBTQ people occur, and are often encouraged by the media and religious and political leaders. At times, government officials, such as police, engage in such acts of violence. Young gay people are known to be disowned by their families and communities and evicted from their homes. Families often seek conversion therapy from religious groups when same-sex orientation or non-conforming gender identity is disclosed; such "therapy" is reported to be commonly administered in abusive and inhumane settings.

Despite the constitution guaranteeing a right to freedom of speech, expression and assembly to Ghanaian citizens, these fundamental rights are actively denied to LGBTQ people. Pro-LGBTQ activism exists in Ghana, but such efforts are often thwarted by the Ghanaian government. Despite this, by 2016 attitudes in Ghana towards homosexuality were evolving and becoming more tolerant and accepting of LGBTQ rights. This situation deteriorated sharply in 2021.

In February 2024, with the support of the country's two major political parties, the Parliament of Ghana unanimously passed the Human Sexual Rights and Family Values Bill to criminalize identifying as LGBTQ in Ghana, with penalties of up to three years in prison. Funding or forming a LGBTQ-related group would be punished by up to five years in prison. The bill was forwarded to president Nana Akufo-Addo, who had said that if most Ghanaians wanted the legislation, he would not oppose it. However, he delayed signing it as two legal challenges were taken up by the Supreme Court. In December, the Supreme Court rejected both cases.

== History ==
Before colonialism came into Ghanaian society, issues around gender and sexuality were regarded as more complex than what is considered today. Many gender roles and relationships that existed were found deep in bed with local customs, traditions and interactions. For example, in the 18th and 19th century, Asante courts, male slaves served as concubines.

The Nzema people had a tradition of adult men marrying each other, usually with a 10-year age difference. These marriage were called agyale, "friendship marriages". The couple would observe all the social equivalents of heterosexual marriage, a bride price was paid and a traditional wedding ceremony was held. Among the Nankani, female marriages were observed for the continuous perpetuation of the lineage. Rose Mary Amenga-Etego states that these non-sexual woman-to-woman marriages were "the last desperate religion-cultural practice employed to reclaim and reinstate the male genealogical descent structure of the people".

The Fante people would believe that those, of either sex, with "heavy souls" were attracted to women, whereas those with "light souls" were attracted to men.

Homosexuality in Ghana was criminalized in 1892. During this time, Ghana was a British colony. The Offences Against the Person Act 1861, a British law that criminalized sodomy, was implemented in all British colonies.

== Legal status ==
Section 104(1)(b) of the Ghanaian Criminal Code of 1960 criminalizes "unnatural carnal knowledge" with the consent of adults, classifying it as a misdemeanor. Section 104(2) further defines "unnatural carnal knowledge" as "sexual intercourse with a person in an unnatural manner or with an animal." Based on the interpretation provided by Section 99, which defines penetration, "unnatural manner" has historically been understood to refer primarily to anal intercourse between men, although the law's wording has allowed for broader interpretation, including oral sex between persons of any gender. Misdemeanors in Ghana are punishable by a maximum of three years' imprisonment under Article 296(4) of the Criminal Procedure Code.

Although prosecutions under these sections have become relatively rare in the 21st century (Human Rights Watch, 2018), the law continues to serve as a basis for systemic discrimination, harassment, and abuse against LGBTQ+ individuals. Even in the absence of formal convictions, police forces have utilized the existence of anti-LGBTQ+ legislation to justify arbitrary arrests, detention without trial, and intimidation. Reports of police raids on private gatherings, extortion of LGBTQ+ individuals, and denial of legal protection when victims report crimes have been widely documented.

The broader social environment in Ghana remains deeply hostile to LGBTQ+ individuals, influenced by prevailing cultural, religious, and traditional norms that view homosexuality as immoral or "un-African." Public officials and religious leaders frequently make statements reinforcing stigma. A 2020 Afrobarometer survey found that over 90% of Ghanaians expressed negative views towards homosexuals, suggesting strong societal support for the continuation of criminalization.

Political leadership has consistently resisted calls to reform or repeal the existing laws. In 2011, then-President John Evans Atta Mills publicly rejected suggestions from UK Prime Minister David Cameron that countries criminalizing homosexuality might face cuts in foreign aid. Mills asserted, "as president, I will never initiate or support any attempt to legalize homosexuality in Ghana," emphasizing national sovereignty and moral values (Mendos, 2020). His stance reflected a broader pattern of resistance among Ghanaian politicians to external pressure regarding LGBTQ+ rights.

In recent years, discussions about decriminalization have occasionally surfaced, largely driven by civil society organizations and international human rights advocates. However, these discussions have often faced fierce backlash from conservative segments of the population and political elites. Rather than moving toward decriminalization, Ghana's legislature moved to reinforce anti-LGBTQ+ measures. In 2021, the "Promotion of Proper Human Sexual Rights and Ghanaian Family Values Bill" was introduced in Parliament. The bill seeks to not only maintain the criminalization of same-sex relations but also to criminalize public displays of LGBTQ+ identity, advocacy, and support. It proposes severe penalties, including up to ten years' imprisonment for individuals or organizations found promoting LGBTQ+ rights.

The 2021 bill has attracted widespread condemnation from international human rights organizations, including the United Nations, Amnesty International, and Human Rights Watch, who argue that it violates the rights to freedom of expression, association, and privacy guaranteed under international human rights law. Critics have warned that the proposed law would legitimize further violence against LGBTQ+ individuals and severely curtail the work of human rights defenders in Ghana.

Despite this international criticism, the bill has gained considerable support domestically, including endorsements from many religious institutions and traditional leaders.

In February 2024, Ghana's Parliament passed the bill, but it required presidential assent to become law. President Nana Akufo-Addo delayed signing, citing legal challenges and potential economic repercussions, including the risk of losing $3.8 billion in World Bank funding. The bill lapsed with the dissolution of Parliament before the 2024 general elections.

Moving forward in March 2025, a group of MPs reintroduced the bill as a private member's bill. President John Dramani Mahama expressed support for the bill's principles but preferred it to be introduced as a government bill with some further consultation with religious and traditional leaders.

In November 2025, the president of Ghana, John Mahama, hinted that he will definitely assent to the bill if passed by the Parliament of Ghana. He indicated his stance when he was addressing the Christian council of Ghana in Accra.

== Application to heterosexuals ==
While Ghana's criminal code criminalizes "unnatural carnal knowledge" under Section 104, which is often interpreted to include anal and oral sex, the law is not exclusively applicable to same-sex individuals. Technically, the statute also extends to heterosexual couples who engage in these acts. However, in practice, enforcement is overwhelmingly targeted at LGBTQ individuals. Heterosexual couples who engage in similar consensual sexual activities are rarely, if ever, prosecuted under this law.

Moreover, the Ghanaian Centre for Democratic Development (CDD-Ghana) notes that such laws are often used as tools of moral policing rather than as genuine criminal justice mechanisms. This disparity raises concerns about privacy rights and equal treatment under the law.

The law also applies to acts of anal or oral sex engaged in by individuals of different sexes. The state, however, "does not concern itself with this" because it is their private life, prompting allegations of hypocrisy.

Critics of the law maintain that this inconsistency is not only hypocritical but also reinforces stigma and exposes LGBTQ individuals to legal harassment, public shaming, and blackmail. The 2021 Human Rights Watch report on Ghana highlighted that the law "has been used more as a weapon of social control than a means of upholding public morality." .

== Relationship and family policy ==
Ghana does not recognize same-sex marriage or civil unions under its current legal framework. The 1992 Constitution of Ghana defines marriage as a union between a man and a woman, and there are no provisions in Ghanaian law that allow for the legal recognition of same-sex relationships. Article 39 of the Constitution further emphasizes the role of traditional values and cultural institutions, which often reinforces heteronormative frameworks and has been used to justify the exclusion of LGBTQ partnerships from legal recognition . Same-sex couples are explicitly excluded from the adoption process, as their relationships are not recognized, and the adoption system does not support joint applications from non-heterosexual partnerships. This lack of recognition leaves LGBTQ individuals in vulnerable legal and social positions, particularly in cases of long-term relationships or shared property.

According to the 2019 Afrobarometer survey, over 90% of Ghanaians expressed intolerance toward homosexuals, reinforcing the limited political will to advance LGBTQ rights, including family. These policies and legal exclusions continue to be a focal point of concern for human rights organizations, which argue that Ghana's approach violates the principles of non-discrimination and family life as enshrined in international human rights law, including the African Charter on Human and Peoples' Rights and the Universal Declaration of Human Rights.

== Discrimination protections ==
No broad legal protections exist for LGBT people against discrimination based on sexual orientation or gender identity in areas such as education, health, housing and employment.

== Living conditions ==
LGBTQ-identifying Ghanaians face a lot of discriminations in Ghanaian society. At the Accra International Airport, a sign states, "Ghana does not welcome paedophiles and sexual deviants." While not explicitly referencing the LGBTQ community, Ghanaians associate sexual deviance with the LGBTQ community. The situation for LGBTQ people deteriorated in 2021. In February, religious and political leaders forced an LGBTQ Centre to close in Accra. In May 2021, police arrested 21 people attending a human rights workshop in Ho city, Volta region. Later that same year, lawmakers proposed a bill containing extreme measures including prohibitions on any expression of non-binary gender or non-heterosexual identity. These could be liable to criminal penalties under the provisions. Human Rights Watch reported an increase in anti-LGBTQ rhetoric associated with the publicity surrounding the proposed laws, in a "climate in which discrimination and violence is already rife". As of June 2023, results of Parliament's consideration of the bill were not yet known.

According to a 19 August 2004 Afrol News report, Prince MacDonald‚ the leader of an organisation for gays, lesbians, bisexuals, and transsexuals in Ghana, commented that "there are lots and lots of people in our prison home who have been caught by this unfriendly law". He said that the "police beat and punish people who are found to be gays".

== Harassment and abuse ==
On 21 July 2011, Paul Evans Aidoo, the Western Region Minister, ordered all gay people in the west of the country to be rounded up and arrested and called on landlords and tenants to inform on people they suspected of being gay. Statements made by public leaders and officials have impact, and are often followed with violent acts towards the LGBTQ community.

Pearl, a 30-year old lesbian woman from Ghana, shares that Ghanaians take action into their own hands when dealing with the LGBTQ community. Pearl shares that in September 2009, she was taken to a conference room in her village, amongst 50 other villagers. In this room, Pearl was repeatedly asked if she was lesbian, and when she stated that she was not, village members beat her. Amongst these villagers was a young boy who wanted to burn her alive.

Similar experiences are shared by other LGBTQ Ghanaians. It is viewed as shameful and as a disgrace for people to have family members that identify as LGBTQ. Emelia, a thirty-year-old woman, shared that when her father discovered that she was lesbian, he beat her with his fists and a broken beer bottle. Similarly, Agnes, a 26-year-old, shared that when her father discovered her sexuality, he chased her out of her house with a machete, and threatened to murder her if she returned. The type of violence LGBTQ-identifying peoples face in Ghana is found not only in community settings, but also in familiar settings, such as one's family.

Violent mob attacks directed against LGBTQ people occur in Ghana. In 2012, a birthday party was violently interrupted by a mob, who claimed the party was a same-sex wedding. The police refused to arrest the attackers, and arrested some of the victims. In 2013, a gay man was subject to a manhunt, after Muslim officials threatened to burn or bury him alive because he was gay. In 2015, a group of lesbian women were "shit-bombed" and "pelted with stones" because they were gay.

On top of facing violence within their communities and homes, there are anti-gay vigilante groups that actively aim at discovering LGBTQ identifying peoples in their communities. A 10-person vigilante group had been monitoring a man, Ebenezer Okang, and one night visited his home to beat him, with the intentions of burning him alive. When asked if he had reported the event, Okang shared that it is difficult to seek protection in such situations, given Ghana's anti-LGBTQ laws and the police attitudes. According to Human Rights Watch, discrimination towards LGBTQ individuals is common in public and private, making it difficult for them to seek help.

In a rare incident in April 2017, police in Accra arrested two men who had blackmailed, extorted and abused a gay man, and who had threatened to post nude pictures of him. The police arrested the men and cooperated with the victim in finding them. Erasing 76 Crimes, an LGBTQ website, labeled the arrest a "rare exception" as police seldom intervene to protect LGBTQ people from violence, discrimination, and abuse.

Reports emerged in August 2018 of conversion therapy programmers run by religious leaders to "cure" LGBTQ people of their homosexuality. There is no reliable evidence that sexual orientation can be changed, and medical bodies warn that conversion therapy practices are ineffective and potentially harmful.

=== Police action ===
Ghana's police force sometimes protects members of the LGBTQ community. For example, in the town of Tamale, they aided gay men who were being blackmailed. On the other hand, police violence against LGBTQ-identifying individuals has been documented. One woman reported that, not only did her community members beat her when they discovered her sexuality, but she was also kicked in the mouth by a police officer.

Ghana's anti-gay laws may legally require the police to persecute LGBTQ citizens. In 2016, a lesbian couple, accused of having a wedding, was arrested by the police. Some LGBTQ groups, such as the Solace Initiative, provide LGBTQ citizens with human rights trained paralegals who can help defend them in court.

==== 2021 Arrests ====
On 20 May 2021 Ghanaian police in Ho, in the Volta region, assisted by security forces, raided and unlawfully arrested 21 people, including a technician, during a paralegal training workshop about how to document and report human rights violations against LGBTQ people. They were detained for 22 days, then released on bail, and charged with unlawful assembly, a misdemeanor. The case was later dismissed for lack of evidence of a crime. The activists said that eight police officers, accompanied by three journalists, forced their way into the conference room, and physically assaulted some participants.

== United Nations recommendations ==
The United Nations Human Rights Committee in October 2012 completed a Universal Periodic Review of the human rights situation in Ghana. The following recommendations were made to Ghana (the countries that initiated the recommendation are listed in brackets):

- Decriminalise same-sex relations between consenting adults (France, Slovenia and the Czech Republic)
- Promote tolerance about same-sex relations (Czech Republic) and combat homophobia (Slovenia and Belgium)
- Combat violence, stigmatization, and discrimination towards persons based on their sexual orientation (Portugal)
- Eliminate the crime of "unnatural sexual relations" and adopt measures to eradicate discrimination motivated by sexual orientation and gender identity (Spain)
- Ensure that the constitutional guarantee of equality and dignity are applied to LGBTQ persons. Ensure thorough and impartial investigation into all allegations of attacks and threats against individuals targeted because of their sexual orientation or gender identity (Norway)
- Consider which recommendations of the High Commissioner on sexual orientation and gender identity can be taken into account in the further detailing of government policies (Netherlands)
- Train police, first responders, the justice system, and social services officials to respect and fully protect the human rights of LGBTQ persons (United States)

Ghana rejected all of these recommendations.

== Public opinion ==
According to a 2017 poll carried out by International Lesbian, Gay, Bisexual, Trans and Intersex Association (ILGA), 60 percent of Ghanaians agreed that gay, lesbian and bisexual people should enjoy the same rights as straight people, while 30 percent disagreed. Additionally, 59 percent agreed that they should be protected from workplace discrimination. 51 percent of Ghanaians, however, said that people who are in same-sex relationships should be charged as criminals, while 34 percent disagreed. As for transgender people, 64 percent agreed that they should have the same rights, 62 percent believed they should be protected from employment discrimination and 55 percent believed they should be allowed to change their legal gender.

According to the Afrobarometer, Ghana places amongst the twenty least tolerable countries. When asked if they would care if they were neighbors to homosexual(s), only 11 per cent of respondents in Ghana reported that they would be fine with this. The continental average for African countries is 21 per cent.

When compared to other minority groups, such as people of a different ethnicity, different religion, foreign workers, or people infected with HIV/AIDS, Ghanaian citizens still reported having the most unfavorable feelings towards those who identify as a part of the LGBTQ community. With 89 percent of Ghanaians sharing that they strongly/somewhat dislike LGBTQ individuals, this makes them the most disliked group in the country of Ghana. Additionally, when examined as to who is being polled, all different demographics those of a different age, education, religion, living style (rural or urban), gender reported having a dislike towards homosexuals of 80 percent or more. However, when individuals are more in contact with those of an LGBTQ identity, they are prone to be more tolerant.

The Director of Interfaith Diversity Network of West Africa (IDNOWA), Davis Mac-Iyalla has said in a public hearing for the far reaching Anti-LGBTQ bill proposed in Ghana that the passing of the Anti-LGBTQI bill into law will codify the spirit of mob action, violence and vigilantism that exist in many parts of the country.

Nearly 90 percent of Ghanaians shared that they would report a daughter, relative, friend, or co-worker to the police if they knew that they were engaging in such behavior. Additionally, 86 percent of Ghanaians stated they would support legislation to criminalise those who are in same-sex relationships.

== Comments by public officials ==
Religious leaders and government officials view LGBTQ rights and advocacy as a new manifestation of Western colonialism. Religious leaders have used passages from the Bible, such as Leviticus 18:22 and Leviticus 20:13, to justify why they condemn homosexuality.

While serving as president of Ghana, the late John Evans Atta Mills vowed in 2011 not to legalise homosexuality despite UK Prime Minister David Cameron's threat to cut aid to Ghana because of its record on human rights for its gay population. In February 2017, the Speaker of the Parliament, Aaron Mike Oquaye called for amending the laws of Ghana to ban homosexuality entirely.

In November 2017, President Nana Akufo-Addo suggested that the legalisation of homosexuality in Ghana is inevitable and said he can foresee a change in the law. Akufo-Addo, who grew up in England, said that LGBTQ rights will evolve in Ghana as they have in the United Kingdom, but affirmed that LGBTQ rights were not part of the government agenda at the moment. In response, LGBTQ activists announced they would hold a peaceful march in Accra in December.

In August 2018, President Akufo-Addo stated that the government of Ghana would not legalise same-sex marriage or decriminalise homosexuality.

Many officials from government and church organizations are publicly against the LGBTQ community. In March 2020, the National Women's Organiser of the National Democratic Congress stated that homosexuals should be killed. Many pastors speak out against the LGBTQ community, such as Kofi Tawiah, Head Pastor of the Osu Church of Christ, who called on Ghanaian Christians to violently attack LGBTQ people. In his statement, Tawiah also stated that homosexuality should be treated with capital punishment.

The 2018 Human Rights Watch report noted that these types of comments made by government and public officials embolden homophobic acts of violence and discrimination towards the LGBTQ community.

In January 2025 when John Mahama returned as president of Ghana, he stated that he prefers the teaching of traditional family values through the Ghana's education system's curriculum instead of making anti-LGBTQ laws. Again, in November the same year, he stated that he is ready to sign anti-LGBTQ bill into law if Parliament pass and send it to him.

== Mental Health and Social Stigma ==
The mental health challenges faced by LGBTQ+ individuals in Ghana remain a deeply underreported and under-addressed issue. Social stigma, discrimination, and legal marginalization contribute significantly to poor mental health outcomes, including high rates of anxiety, depression, and suicidal ideation. Ghana's criminalization of same-sex relations, coupled with cultural and religious condemnation, has fostered an environment of fear, isolation, and internalized homophobia for many LGBTQ+ persons.

According to a report by Human Rights Watch, LGBTQ+ individuals in Ghana frequently face harassment, family rejection, and public humiliation, which significantly heightens psychological distress. The report notes that many LGBTQ+ Ghanaians "live in constant fear," and some have been driven to suicide due to the trauma associated with forced evictions, blackmail, and physical violence.

Some LGBTQ+ individuals also face severe mental health challenges due to stigmatization and discrimination in the workplace leading to social isolation. A study on self-harm among LGBTQ+ adolescents in Ghana found that they are at a significantly higher risk of suicidal ideation and self-harm compared to their heterosexual peer.

Research also highlights the limited availability of safe and affirming mental health services. Mental health professionals in Ghana are often not trained to work with LGBTQ+ populations and may hold prejudiced views themselves. The Ghana Mental Health Authority, despite its progressive 2012 Mental Health Act, has yet to fully implement inclusive policies that recognize the specific vulnerabilities of sexual and gender minorities.

International organizations have called on Ghana to incorporate mental health protections into broader human rights efforts for LGBTQ+ individuals. The United Nations Office of the High Commissioner for Human Rights (OHCHR) recommends that states take proactive steps to reduce the mental health risks for LGBTQ+ persons by eliminating discriminatory laws, offering mental health support services, and promoting public education campaigns to reduce stigma.

Due to fear of persecution, many LGBTQ+ individuals avoid seeking healthcare services, leading to barriers in accessing mental health and sexual health support. Reports also indicate that police brutality and arbitrary arrests of LGBTQ+ individuals contribute to psychological distress and increased vulnerability.

Several LGBTQ+ organizations, such as LGBT+ Rights Ghana, have attempted to create safe spaces and support systems for affected individuals. However, in February 2021, Ghanaian authorities shut down an LGBTQ+ community center in Accra, following threats from religious and political groups.

== Activism ==
LGBTQ activism had largely been anonymous in Ghana. However, in the year 1998, a young man named Cobbina MacDarling, who uses the pseudonym Prince Kweku MacDonald, became one of its voices. Prince works with the Gay and Lesbian Association of Ghana (GALAG) which was later transformed into a human rights organization known as the Centre for Popular Education and Human Rights (CEPEHRG). In recent years, there have been several grassroot LGBTQ groups which have come together to form a bigger movement under the name Coalition Against Homophobia, Transphobia and Biphobia in Ghana. These groups operate underground. There are a few LGBTQ groups in Ghana, most of whom operate secretly online. One such group is FOTHA-Ghana (Friends of the Heart Alliance - Ghana). Members of the group operate through the dark web. To be seen supporting the views and interest of gays, lesbians and bisexuals can easily result in the attack or probable lynching of its members. One of the groups that is public in its advocacy efforts is GALAG. Some of their work involves demystifying issues with the HIV/AIDS crisis. Despite Ghana having a low infection rate, the government's public campaign efforts on this health crisis typically present it as an issue for straight individuals. Most gay men acknowledged that they understood that HIV can be transmitted sexually, but they were unaware that it can be transmitted through anal sex as well. Ghana receives funding to combat HIV/AIDS, but they discount the health risk presented for LGBTQ individuals. GALAG, along with other LGBTQ advocacy groups, counteract the government's misinformation by specifically addressing it to the LGBTQ community, and by distributing and teaching of the usefulness of condoms and lube in preventing infection. In January 2021, LGBT+ Rights Ghana, a pro-LGBTQ rights organization opened its office in Accra amidst opposition from anti-LGBTQ rights groups. The office was raided and closed by National Security in late February 2021 due to opposition from locals, religions institutions, and politicians.

An issue with many activist groups is that their work is directly thwarted by the government. In September 2006, the BBC reported that the Ghanaian government had banned an LGBTQ rights conference that was alleged to be taking place on 4 September at the Accra International Conference Centre. Minister of Information and National Origin Kwamena Bartels said, "The government does not condone any such activity which violently offends the culture, morality ... and heritage of the entire people of Ghana."

In March 2020, a historic conference was to be held in Accra. The Pan Africa ILGA was aiming to hold its first conference in West Africa to develop strategies to improve LGBTQ rights, increase awareness of LGBTQ issues, and to protect queer youth in Africa. After Ghana faced backlash from religious organizations, President Nana Akufo-Addo banned the event, citing that it would be considered illegal for such an event to be held in Ghana, since they legally condemn and criminalise same-sex acts amongst adults.

In June 2022, Ghanaian LGBTQ rights activists filed lawsuits against the government for the government's current stance on LGBTQ rights and over allegations of abuse.

=== Anti-activism ===
LGBTQ advocacy efforts are often opposed and made illegal by the government, but anti-LGBTQ groups are embraced. In October 2019, the World Congress of Families, a US-based anti-LGBTQ group, held a conference in Accra, during which they encouraged Africans to adopt the practice of conversion therapy. These types of conferences are not the only types of anti-LGBTQ sentiments being shared and embraced in Ghana. It is also documented that vigilante groups go after the LGBTQ community in Ghana. Such groups spy, blackmail, and plan attacks on LGBTQ citizens, or those they suspect to be LGBTQ. Safety Empire is one of these vigilante groups, and in August 2015, they beat a young man they suspected to be gay in a town near the capital.

In 2018, the National Coalition for Proper Human Sexual Rights and Family Values, a Ghanaian anti-LGBTQ advocacy group, held a conference during which they asserted that approximately 400 individuals had registered for conversion therapy programs. The group has actively opposed comprehensive sex education and supported anti-LGBTQ legislation, claiming that LGBTQ individuals who reject conversion therapy should face incarceration.

On an international front, many external entities, such as the United Nations and other individual countries, speak in favor of LGBTQ rights. Groups that are pro-LGBTQ rights view these international statements unfavorably, since they are often viewed as statements that do not support their advocacy or efforts, and only reignite the hate and discrimination towards LGBTQ individuals. An example of this is former President Atta Mills vowing to never legalize homosexuality when urged by the United Kingdom. This brought the issue of homosexuality back to a national front, but not in a favorable position.

== Anti-LGBTQ bill update ==
A few months after the opening of the center and the backlash from both the government and citizens that followed, a draft for a new bill was leaked on the internet. This bill was introduced by the Ghanaian lawmakers, called Promotion of Proper Human Sexual Rights and Ghanaian Family Values Bill which aimed to criminalize LGBTQ+ people and people who advocate for LGBTQ+ rights in Ghana. The bill consists of several penalties that were proposed. For same sex relationships, public display of affection and support for LGBTQ+ rights. The law also seeks to ban transgender healthcare and dissolve LGBTQ+ organizations.

MP's said the bill was drafted in response to the opening of Ghana's first LGBTQ+ community center in the capital, Accra, in January 2021. However, police shut down the center after there had been many public protests, and pressure from religious groups, parties, and traditional leaders, mainly in the Christian faith.

Under this bill, public displays of same-sex affection and crossdressing would be punished with jail, it would be illegal to form LGBTQ organizations or to disseminate information perceived as supporting LGBTQ people or rights, certain kinds of healthcare would be banned, and "conversion therapy" could be mandated. It would be illegal even to identify as LGBTQ, and advocacy for LGBTQ rights could result in 5–10 years in prison. Same-sex marriage and adoption by same-sex couples would also be banned.

The memorandum of the bill claims that Ghana, its government, the majority of its citizens, its culture, and history completely disapprove of the LGBTQ community. The bill was presented before parliament in early August 2021. Ghana's parliament scheduled and reopen it in late October 2021, after which a vote may be held.

The Presbyterian Church of Ghana have been very vocal about their support for the new proposed Anti-LGBTQ+ bill that is currently before the Parliament of Ghana.

In February 2023, the Attorney-General and Minister of Justice approved the bill and stated that both the bill and an accompanying report would be formally sent to the House for debate "hopefully before the end of March."

In March 2023, Ghana's President Nana Akufo-Addo announced that "substantial elements" of the Anti-LGBTQ+ bill being considered by parliament "have been modified" following an intervention by the government.

As of September 2023, the bill was still advancing.

In February 2024, Ghana's Parliament passed the bill, but it required presidential assent to become law. President Nana Akufo-Addo delayed signing, citing legal challenges and potential economic repercussions, including the risk of losing $3.8 billion in World Bank funding. The bill lapsed with the dissolution of Parliament before the 2024 general elections.

In March 2025, a group of MPs reintroduced the bill as a private member's bill. President John Dramani Mahama expressed support for the bill's principles but preferred it to be introduced as a government bill with some further consultation with religious and traditional leaders.

The Human Sexual Rights and Family Values Bill 2025 was programmed to be reintroduced in the order paper for the first sitting in the third meeting of the Parliament of Ghana on Tuesday, October 21, 2025. That didn't happen after Parliament was adjourned early on that day.

In May 2026, the Parliament of Ghana passed the anti-LGBTQ+ bill sponsored by John Ntim Fordjour, which criminalises homosexuality and the promotion of LGBTQ+ activities. As part of the bill, identifying as lesbian, gay, bisexual, transgender or queer can result in a sentence of three years in prison. The three year sentence also applies to those who engage in homosexual relations. Under the bill, a three to five year prison will apply to the promotion, sponsorship or intentional support of LGBTQ activities. Those who identify as an "ally" of LGBTQ+ people may also face a prison sentence. Fordjour said the bill protects Ghanaian family and cultural values. Human Rights Watch condemned the bill, calling on Ghana's government to, "uphold the international legal protections that guarantee every Ghanaian equality, non-discrimination, freedom of expression, and privacy." The bill still needs to be signed by president of Ghana, John Mahama, before it becomes law. Mahama has indicated that he will support the bill's passage.

== Summary table ==
Same-sex sexual activity legal	No (Penalty: up to 3 years in jail)
Equal age of consent	No
Anti-discrimination laws in employment only	No
Anti-discrimination laws in the provision of goods and services	No
Anti-discrimination laws in all other areas (Incl. indirect discrimination, hate speech)	No
Same-sex marriages	No
Recognition of same-sex couples	No
Stepchild adoption by same-sex couples	No
Joint adoption by same-sex couples	No
LGBTQ people allowed to serve openly in the military	No
Right to change legal gender	No
Access to IVF for lesbians	No
Conversion therapy made illegal	No
Commercial surrogacy for gay male couples	No
MSMs allowed to donate blood	No

== See also ==
- Criminalization of transgender people
- Human rights in Ghana
- LGBTQ rights in Africa
- Saso people
