= Rightify Ghana =

Ghanaian LGBT rights organization

- Formation: February 2020
- Headquarters: Ghana
- Website: https://rightifyghana.org

Rightify Ghana is a Ghanaian organization that advocates for LGBT rights in Ghana. Rightify Ghana was established in February 2020 as a non-profit organization to advocate for the rights of LGBT+ Ghanaians.

The Ghanaian government has long denied LGBTQ+ Ghanaians respect, protection, and recognition. Rightify Ghana came together to raise awareness about the many challenges faced by the community – challenges neglected by the government at the policy level. The organization seeks to mitigate harm, identify solutions, and ultimately empower sexual and gender minorities across the country.

== Activism ==
Rightify Ghana has been one of the organizations leading efforts to advocate for the rights of LGBT+ Ghanaians and fight the Ghanaian anti-LGBT bill laid before the Parliament of Ghana.

In January 2022, Rightify Ghana launched a fundraiser to expand advocacy for LGBTQI+ people living in Ghana.

The second pillar of Rightify Ghana’s work is community empowerment, particularly capacity building and human rights education. In addition to facilitating healthcare education and access, such as that to HIV resources, Rightify facilitates psycho-social support services. This means providing counseling for community members on issues ranging from accepting one’s identity to confronting homophobia, to experiencing an existential crisis. These services aim to provide community members with the tools to live in harmony with their sexual orientation and gender identity – despite the many challenges of internalized homophobia, religious conflicts, family dynamics, etc.
