= Coz Ov Moni =

- Directed by: King Luu
- Written by: FOKN BOIS
- Produced by: Panji Anoff
- Starring: Mensa Ansah; Emmanuel Owusu-Bonsu
- Edited by: King Luu
- Distributed by: Pidgen Music / Luu Vision
- Release date: 2010
- Running time: 45 minutes
- Country: Ghana
- Language: Pidgin English

Coz Ov Moni - The First Pidgen Musical Film in the World is a 2010 musical film produced by the FOKN BOIS and directed by independent Ghanaian filmmaker King Luu.

The film is a musical entirely spoken in Ghanaian Pidgin English, but subtitles are shown.

== Synopsis ==
On a normal morning in Gbese, Accra, the FOKN BOIS (rapping duo M3NSA and Wanlov the Kubolor) wake up and plan to go clubbing with some lady friends after chasing an evasive debtor for their money. After getting the money, they set off to blow it off on food, partying and women with hilarious and dramatic consequences. While going through the day, the story highlights real struggles of ordinary young Ghanaians in modern Ghana in spite of the strong elements of humour. Their free-spirited and seemingly conceited attitude makes them a few enemies as the day progresses resulting in a dramatic ending.

== Cast ==
- M3NSA
- Wanlov the Kubolor
- Reggie Rockstone
- Samini
- Macho Rapper
- Mutombo Da Poet
- Mokin

== Release ==
The film premiered in Ghana on 15 May 2010 at Ghana's National Theatre in Accra, and premiered in the United Kingdom on 22 July 2010 at The Ritzy in London. The film was also presented at various film festivals, including the Rio International Film Festival (Rio de Janeiro), Pan African Film Festival (Los Angeles), Black Filmmakers International Film Festival (London), Pan African Film Festival (Cannes), and was the headliner Movie at African Weekender (Sussex). It was subsequently released as a double disc VCD/CD combination, with the film featured on the Video CD of disc 1, and the movie soundtrack featured on disc 2.

The soundtrack was then re-released once more as Kweku Ananse + FOKN BOIS present... Coz Ov Moni - The Remix EP, which featured entirely remixed songs off the Soundtrack by Ghanaian producer Kweku Ananse.

== Awards and honours ==
- Ghana UK-Based Achievement Awards: 1
  - Special Achievement Award: 2011

== See also ==
- Coz Ov Moni 2 (FOKN Revenge) (2013), The sequel
