= Ghanaian anti-LGBTQ bill =

Proposed anti-LGBT+ law in Ghana

Human Sexual Rights and Family Values Bill

Parliament of Ghana
- Long title: A Bill to provide for human sexual rights and family values and related matters.
- Territorial extent: Ghana

Legislative history
- Committee responsible: Legal and Parliamentary Affairs
- First reading: 2 August 2021
- Considered by the Legal and Parliamentary Affairs Committee: March 2023
- Second reading: 5 July 2023
- Third reading: 28 February 2024

Summary
- A bill to provide for human sexual rights and family values and for related matters
- Status: Expired

The anti-LGBTQ bill in Ghana, formally the Human Sexual Rights and Family Values Bill, is a pending law in Ghana that would introduce wide-ranging restrictions on LGBTQ rights. The bill was approved by the Parliament of Ghana on 28 February 2024 with bipartisan support and would only have come into effect if signed into law by then-President Nana Akufo-Addo, since succeeded as president by John Dramani Mahama. The bill lapsed with the dissolution of Ghana's parliament prior to the 2024 Ghanaian general election. In March 2025, a group of 10 MPs reintroduced it as a private member's bill, which must begin the parliamentary process again from the start; President Mahama said that while he supported the principle of the legislation, he would prefer it to be introduced as a government bill rather as a private member's bill. The anti-LGBTQ+ bill passed in Ghana's parliament in May 2026. The bill still needs to be signed by president of Ghana, John Mahama before it becomes law. Mahama has indicated that he will support the bill's passage.

== Background ==
Homosexuality in Ghana was first criminalised under the Offences Against the Person Act 1861, a law introduced during British rule. The Act was implemented in all British colonies. Following independence, Section 104 of the Ghanaian Criminal Code of 1960 criminalised "unnatural carnal knowledge."

== Summary ==
The long title of the draft law is "A Bill to provide for human sexual rights and family values and related matters."

Among the provisions of the most recent version of the bill are:

- 3 years imprisonment for identifying as lesbian, gay, bisexual, transgender or queer.
- Up to 3 years of imprisonment for engaging in homosexual relations.
- 3 to 5 year imprisonment for the promotion, sponsorship or intentional support of LGBTQ activities.
- Those who identify as an "ally" of LGBTQ+ people may also face a prison sentence.
- A requirement for citizens and institutions to "promote and protect proper human sexual rights and Ghanaian family values".
- 6 months to 1 year imprisonment for a "public show of romantic relations" between people of the same sex.
- 6 months to 1 year imprisonment for a "public show of romantic relations " with someone who has undergone gender reassignment or who cross-dresses.
- A ban on providing trans healthcare.
- Forced disbanding of all LGBT+ associations in Ghana, along with 6 to 10 years of imprisonment for anyone taking part in such an association.
- A ban on sponsoring LGBT+ groups.
- A clause that holds owners of digital platforms or physical premises in which LGBT+ groups organise equally guilty of promoting LGBT+ activities.
- Prohibition of same-sex marriage.
- Prohibition of marriage to people who have undergone gender reassignment.
- 6 to 10 years of imprisonment for anyone who teaches children about LGBT+ activities or teaches that there are more genders than the gender binary.
- A ban on adoption and fostering for LGBT+ potential parents.
- 6 months to 3 years imprisonment for anyone who harasses someone accused of being LGBT+.
- A clause allowing the government to extradite people convicted under the bill.

== Legislative history ==
=== First reading ===
In mid-June 2021, Speaker of the Parliament of Ghana Alban Bagbin stated that LGBT+ rights "should not be encouraged or accepted by our society" and that "urgent actions are being taken to pass a law to eventually nip the activities of [LGBT+] groups in the bud." Later that month, eight MPs in the Parliament proposed the Promotion of Proper Human Sexual Rights and Ghanaian Family Values Bill 2021. The eight MPs were Sam Nartey George, Della Sowah, Emmanuel Kwasi Bedzrah, Alhassan Suhuyini, Rita Naa Odoley Sowah, Helen Ntoso, and Rockson-Nelson Dafeamekpor, all of the National Democratic Congress, as well as John Ntim Fordjour of the New Patriotic Party. On 1 July, Alban Bagbin stated that he expected the law to be passed within six months, telling a prayer meeting of Ghanaian MPs that "the LGBT+ pandemic is worse than COVID-19."

On 2 August 2021, the bill passed its first reading in the Ghanaian Parliament, being referred to the Committee on Constitutional, Legal and Parliamentary Affairs.

=== Committee hearings ===
On 13 October 2021, the majority leader in Parliament Osei Kyei Mensah Bonsu said that the Parliament would ensure "careful balance" in assessing the bill.

On 5 November 2021, deputy majority leader Alexander Kwamina Afenyo-Markin announced that the Constitutional, Legal and Parliamentary Affairs Committee would begin hearing petitions in a week, estimating that "we are looking at 15 weeks for the hearings to be done."

On 12 November 2021, public hearings began on the bill in the Parliament of Ghana. On the first day of hearings, Henry Kwasi Prempeh of the Ghana Centre for Democratic Development spoke against the bill, saying that "merely because you see yourself as part of a momentary majority, does not entitle you to impose your will on even one individual in the society." Kyeremeh Atuahene of the Ghana AIDS Commission said that the bill risked criminalising anti-HIV/AIDS efforts in the country, and also pushing back against donor funding.

On 30 November 2021, Akwasi Osei of the Mental Health Authority Ghana spoke in support of the bill, saying that homosexuality was abnormal and that a majority of LGBT+ people in Ghana claimed to be queer because of peer pressure. That day, Commissioner of Human Rights and Administrative Justice of Ghana Joseph Whittal told the Parliament to "be careful on the bill." saying that Commission was neither for nor against the bill but that the bill risked putting advocates for human rights in danger of criminal prosecution.

On 6 December 2021, Moses Foh-Amoaning of the National Coalition for Proper Human Sexual Rights and Family Values spoke in support of the bill, saying LGBT+ people were "not well, and the law gives [health authorities] the power to restrain such people."

=== Second reading ===
On 5 July 2023, the Parliament of Ghana unanimously voted to grant the Bill a second reading, and agreed to minor amendments proposed by the Constitutional, Legal and Parliamentary Affairs Committee.

=== Third reading ===
On 28 February 2024, the Parliament voted unanimously to pass the law. The version that passed included shorter jail terms than an earlier version and a clause on conversion therapy was omitted. An attempt by Alexander Afenyo-Markin to amend the law to replace prison sentences with counselling and community service was heckled down by lawmakers. The bill will come into effect if President Nana Akufo-Addo signs it into law.

On 29 April 2024, a High Court in Accra dismissed a call to push President Nana Akufo-Addo to assent to the bill passed by parliament. Akufo-Addo had mentioned he would wait for the verdict of two Supreme Court cases challenging the constitutionality of the bill before making a decision.

=== Reintroduction of the bill ===
During the first sitting of the third meeting of the Ninth Parliament of the Republic of Ghana on Tuesday, October 21, 2025 the Human Sexual Rights and Family Values Bill 2025 was programmed on the order paper to be presented and read for its first time. This did not happen because the Parliament of Ghana was adjourned to the following day.

=== May 2026, passing of the bill in parliament ===
In May 2026, the Parliament of Ghana passed the anti-LGBTQ+ bill sponsored by John Ntim Fordjour, which criminalises homosexuality and the promotion of LGBTQ+ activities. As part of the bill, identifying as lesbian, gay, bisexual, transgender or queer can result in a sentence of three years in prison. The three year sentence also applies to those who engage in homosexual relations. Under the bill, a three to five year prison will apply to the promotion, sponsorship or intentional support of LGBTQ activities. Those who identify as an "ally" of LGBTQ+ people may also face a prison sentence. Fordjour said the bill protects Ghanaian family and cultural values. Human Rights Watch condemned the bill, calling on Ghana's government to, "uphold the international legal protections that guarantee every Ghanaian equality, non-discrimination, freedom of expression, and privacy." The bill still needs to be signed by president of Ghana, John Mahama before it becomes law. Mahama has indicated that he will support the bill's passage.

== Supreme Court challenges ==
On 8 May 2024, the Supreme Court of Ghana began proceedings for the case filed by a Ghanaian journalist, Richard Sky, against the bill. Presided by the Chief Justice, the proceedings ended with the lawyers of the journalist asked to submit a fresh motion to amend their reliefs. The case adjourned to 17 May 2024.

A separate challenge was filed by the lawyer Amanda Odoi.

On 18 December 2024, the Supreme Court dismissed both cases.

== Reception ==
=== Domestic reactions ===
==== Domestic opposition ====
Ghanaian human rights NGO Rightify Ghana called the bill "an attack on our fundamental human rights" stating that it would "steal our freedoms of speech and expression, right to privacy, freedoms of association and assembly, as well as rights to healthcare, employment, housing and others." The Humanist Association of Ghana called the bill an attempt "to further oppress the LGBTQI+ community as well as allies," stating that Ghana's international reputation "has taken a big hit."

Journalist Nana Ama Agyemang Asante said that she was "stunned by the contents, the crudeness of the language, and the cruelty behind [the bill]." On 4 October, 18 prominent Ghanaians co-signed a statement against the bill. The signatories included Takyiwaa Manuh, Akoto Ampaw, Kwame Karikari, Audrey Gadzekpo, Rose Mensah-Kutin, Emmanuel Gyimah-Boadi, Dzodzi Tsikata, Henry Kwasi Prempeh, and Raymond Atuguba.

The Liberal Party of Ghana announced opposition to the bill. Samia Yaba Nkrumah, the former Member of Parliament for Jomoro and former CPP chairperson, has urged President Akufo-Addo to refrain from giving assent to the Bill. She characterized the bill as a brutal, harsh, and unjust piece of legislation.

Ghana's finance ministry headed by Dr. Mohammed Amin Adam, Bank of Ghana (BOG) and the Ghana Revenue Authority has cautioned the president against endorsing a contentious anti-LGBT bill recently approved by parliament. The ministry has highlighted the potential risk, estimating that the country will forfeit a substantial $3.8 billion (£3 billion) in World Bank funding within the upcoming five to six years if the bill becomes law. The proposed legislation mandates a three-year prison sentence for individuals identifying as LGBT+ and a five-year imprisonment for those involved in promoting LGBT+ activities. Ghana is currently grappling with a significant economic downturn and received assistance from the International Monetary Fund (IMF) just last year. There are apprehensions that any deficiency in funding from the World Bank and other donors could disrupt the ongoing economic recovery efforts. On 12 March 2024, John Dramani Mahama, at the time opposition leader and former President (but since January 2025, the serving President once more), alleged that Akufo-Addo delayed signing the Anti-LGBTQ+ Bill over foreign aid dependency.

==== Domestic support ====
Among Ghanaian political parties, the New Patriotic Party, the People's National Convention, the National Democratic Congress, the Convention People's Party, the National Democratic Party, and the All People's Congress announced support for bill.

In August 2024, Ghana’s previous vice president Mahamudu Bawumia said that he would sign the bill into law if he became president, if the Supreme Court decided that the bill was “consistent with the Constitution.” Mahamdu sought to become Ghana’s president in the 2024 Ghanaian general election. The bill was protested in Ghana's capital city in September 2024.

Osagyefo Agyeman Badu II, President of Bono Regional House of Chiefs, stated that "chiefs in this country are strongly behind [the bill]" and threatened to "storm parliament with 10 000 people" if the bill was not passed.

Bishop of Asante Mampong and Archbishop for the Church of the Province of West Africa Cyril Kobina Ben-Smith said that the Anglican Church in Ghana would "do anything within our powers and mandate to ensure that the bill comes into fruition" and that the church considered "LGBT+ as unrighteousness in the sight of God." On 5 October 2021, the Christian Council of Ghana and the Ghana Pentecostal and Charismatic Council released a joint statement supporting the bill, saying that being LGBT+ was "alien to the Ghanaian culture and family value system, and as such, the citizens of this nation cannot accept it." Sheikh Aremeyaw Shaibu, spokesperson for the Chief Imam of Ghana, said that "this is the time to make the laws more stringent because of the force with which those activities are being promoted in our country" and saying that MPs supporting the bill "must never give up." The Ghana Catholic Bishops Conference, the Presbyterian Church of Ghana, and the Coalition of Muslim Organisations, Ghana also announced support for the bill. On 12 December 2023 the Ghana Catholic Bishop Conference reiterated its support for the bill, calling it "a step in the right direction".

In June 2022, after reactions by proponents of the bill, billboards in Accra and Tamale were pulled down for illegally promoting LGBTQ activities. Sam George, one of the proponents of the bill, called the erection of the billboards an action against the constitution of Ghana.

==== Other ====
On 24 October 2021, Ghanaian president Nana Akufo-Addo called for civil discussion on the bill, stating that "we will recognise the need for us to be tolerant of each other when there are opposing views. I think it will be a credit to Ghananian democracy if this matter is handled in the correct manner." On 28 October, Yaw Boadu-Ayeboafoh, chairman of the National Media Commission, stated that "sometimes sentiments are more than rationalism in the way that the debate goes" in reference to the bill.

=== International reactions ===
The Office of the United Nations High Commissioner for Human Rights said that "adopting the legislation in its current or any partial form would be tantamount to a violation of a number of human rights standards, including the absolute prohibition of torture."

Human Rights Watch LGBT+ director Graeme Reid said the bill was "so onerous it beggars belief" and that it "represents a witch-hunt against LGBT people in Ghana." Amnesty International called for the Ghanaian Parliament to "immediately withdraw" the bill, saying that it "gravely contravenes the principles of equality and non-discrimination, the rights to freedom of expression, association and privacy, and the prohibition of torture enshrined in the 1992 Constitution of Ghana and international human rights treaties ratified by the country."

Archbishop Emeritus of Cape Town Desmond Tutu compared the bill to apartheid, saying "I'm absolutely, utterly and completely certain that God wouldn't be homophobic." Archbishop of York Stephen Cottrell and Bishop of London Sarah Mullally condemned the bill. Archbishop of Canterbury Justin Welby initially said he was "gravely concerned" by the bill, however later apologised for the statement, saying that he had "no authority over the Church of Ghana, nor would I want any."

The bill has been linked by several commentators to the World Congress of Families, an American conservative Christian organisation designated by the Southern Poverty Law Center as anti-LGBTQ hate group. In 2019, the WCF had held a conference in Accra, where delegates had proposed forming legal teams to bring constitutional attacks on LGBT+ rights in Ghana.

== See also ==
- 2021 Ghana gay arrests
- Criminalization of transgender people
- Hungarian anti-LGBTQ law
- Russian gay propaganda law
- Anti-Homosexuality Act, 2023 – Ugandan law
