= M3NSA =

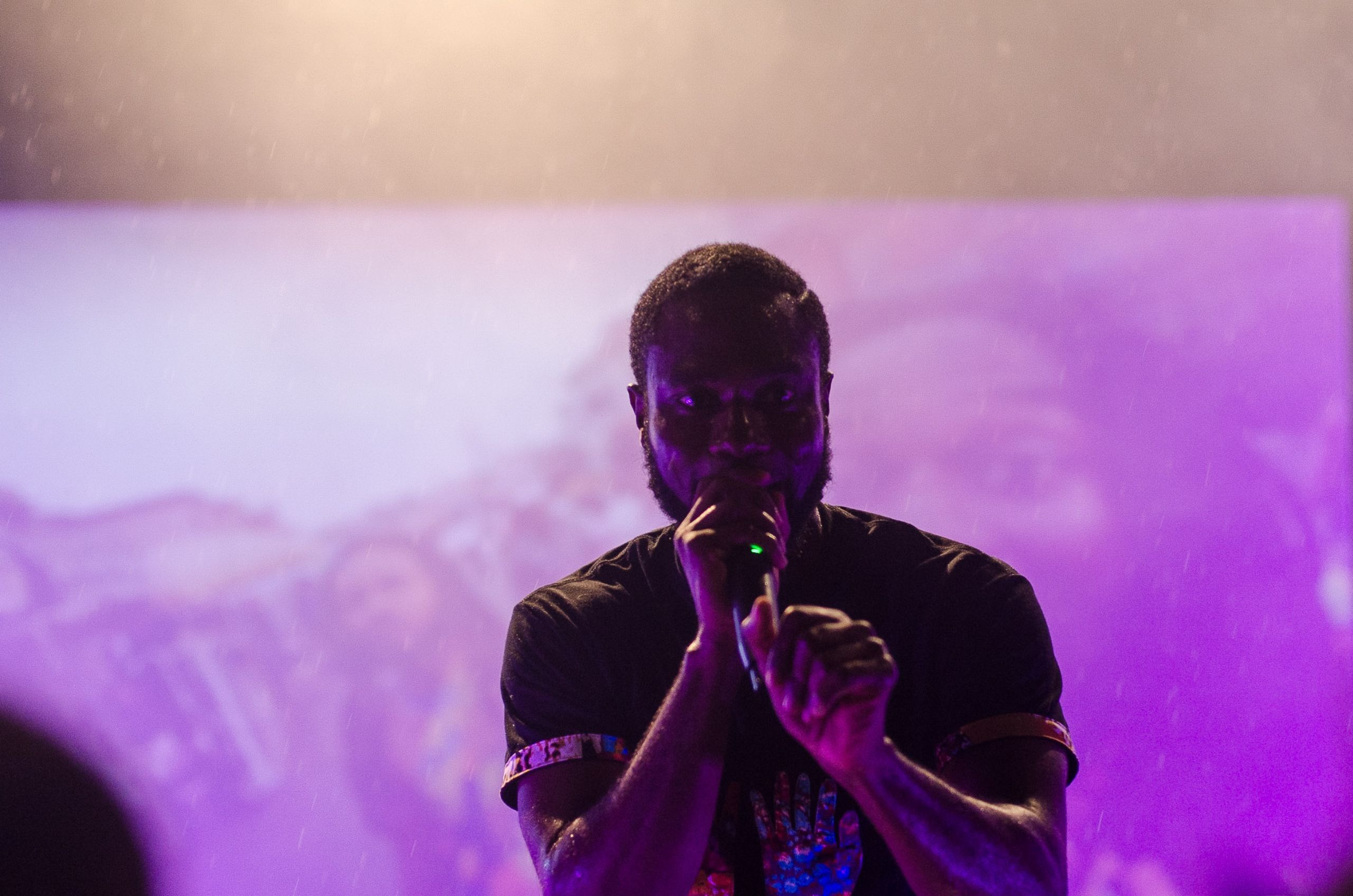
- M3nsa performing in Accra

Background information
- Born: Mensa Ansah; 1981 (age 44–45); Accra, Greater Accra Region, Ghana
- Genres: Hip Hop, Electronic, Highlife, Hiplife, Afrobeats
- Occupations: Producer, songwriter, rapper, filmmaker.
- Years active: 1997 – present
- Label: Independent
- Website: www.mensaansah.com

Mensa Ansah, better known as M3NSA is a British Ghanaian producer, composer, rapper, singer and filmmaker.

== Early life ==
M3NSA was born in 1981 at Accra, Ghana. He is the third son of Tumi Ebo Ansah, formerly a member of the Afro pop group, Osibisa.

== Musical career ==
M3NSA began as a member of The Lifeline Family. A group he founded and worked with as a rapper. After the group was disbanded, he ventured music production and begun producing music for Reggie Rockstone. He later begun producing music for various Ghanaian musicians, some of which include Samini, KK Fosu, Obour and Tic Tac.

As a music artiste, M3NSA has toured with musicians such as the Wu-Tang Clan, and The Roots.

== Discography ==
=== Solo albums ===
- 2001 - Rapublic
- 2004 - Daily Basses
- 2007 - Weather Report
- 2011 - No.1 Mango Street
- 2021 - Bondzie
- 2024 - FOLAH (Fear Of Love And Happiness)

=== FOKN Bois Albums ===
- 2010 - Coz Ov Moni OS - Movie Soundtrack
- 2011 - Coz Ov Moni - The Kweku Ananse Remix EP - EP
- 2011 - Coz Ov Moni - The DJ Juls Dw3t3i Remixes - EP
- 2011 - FOKN Dunaquest in Budapest - EP
- 2012 - FOKN Dunaquest in Budapest Remixes - EP
- 2012 - FOKN Wit Ewe - Album
- 2013 - Coz Ov Moni 2 (FOKN Revenge) OS - Movie Soundtrack
- 2016 - FOKN Ode to Ghana
- 2019 - Afrobeats LOL

== Personal life ==
M3NSA is a nephew to Kwaw Ansah, a film director, and Kofi Ansah, a fashion designer. He is also a cousin to the actor Joey Ansah.
