= Ghanaian Pidgin English =

Pidgin language

- kru brofo (Akan) kulu blofo (Ga)
- Native to: Ghana
- Region: West Africa
- Native speakers: 2,000 (2011)
- Language family: English Creole: Atlantic; West African Pidgin English; Ghanaian Pidgin English

Language codes
- ISO 639-3: gpe
- Glottolog: ghan1244
- Linguasphere: 52-ABB-be

Faisal Ali speaking in Ghanaian Pidgin about the language's Wikipedia project

Ghanaian Pidgin English (GhaPE) is a Ghanaian English-lexifier pidgin also known as Broken English and Kru English (kroo brofo in Akan) which, like other varieties of West African Pidgin English originated as a language of contact between colonizing British and African slave traders for the transatlantic slave trade.. GhaPE is a regional variety of West African Pidgin English spoken in Ghana, predominantly in the southern capital, Accra, and surrounding towns. It has strong influence from Received Pronunciation, as well as Ga and Akan, two languages indigenous to the Greater Accra region.

Compared to other West African creoles and particularly other West African Pidgin English varieties such as Nigerian Pidgin English, GhaPE is more restricted in social usage and seems to be more stigmatized. A contributing factor may be the relative importance and usage of other languages such as Standard Ghanaian English (SGE), Hausa, and Akan (particularly the Twi dialect) as lingua francas. Other researchers posit long-lasting language ideologies about prestige dialects as a reason for this difference. While GhaPE is generally intelligible with other varieties of West African Pidgin English, there are some significant lexical distinctions, particularly involving vocabulary coming from substrate languages, for instance, the words "biz" (which stands for "ask"), "kai" (which means "remember") and "gbeketii", meaning "in the evening", in the Standard Ghanaian English.

GhaPE can be divided into two basilectal and mesolectal varieties, which academically are referred to as "Town" and "Student" pidgin in newer literature, with "Student" pidgin first emerging as a term in 2002. They may also be referred to as "uneducated" or "non-institutionalized" pidgin and "educated" or "institutionalized" pidgin respectively. The basilectal Town pidgin is predominantly associated with casual conversation and lower/working class speakers.

Beginning in the 1960s and 1970s, male students in boarding and secondary schools began using GhaPE as a form of rebellion against strict educational language ideologies, as educators have attempted to ban the use of pidgin in schools several times. Additionally, these students used GhaPE to express solidarity and camaraderie and establish social groups, with female students and those seen as lacking proficiency in GhaPE being excluded from conversation. For many students, particularly those born outside of major cities like Accra or Tema, this was their first exposure to any form of GhaPE.

This usage of pidgin eventually morphed into the lexically distinct Student pidgin. Student pidgin is often acquired and used in institutions such as boarding schools and universities and are influenced by Standard Ghanaian English. While originally limited to educated male students, Student Pidgin has been increasingly picked up by young women and uneducated young adults, as well as even asserting influence on speakers of Town pidgin due to its association with wealth and education.

Women have been historically less likely to use GhaPE in public or professional settings to avoid the social stigma of illiteracy associated with GhaPE. Use of GhaPE has generally been limited to same-gender groups of similarly aged speakers, though increasingly the boundaries of what is and is not acceptable as speech are blurring. As early as 2008, GhaPE was observed in use in romantic contexts between men and women, and children of middle class families may acquire GhaPE from their fathers even before attending school. However, GhaPE is generally considered unacceptable in formal or traditional contexts, even by speakers who would otherwise use it socially with the same individuals.

Contemporary GhaPE, with influences from both Student and Town pidgin, is spoken by 20% of the population with 5 million speakers. Some of the settings in which GhaPE is commonly used include "educational institutions, work places, airports, seaports, drinking places, markets, on the radio, popular songs, and on political platforms", as well as in military or police forces and in casual, social settings. Over the years, some young Ghanaian writers have taken to writing literary pieces such as short stories in GhaPE as an act of protest. GhaPE has also seen expression in songs and movies and in advertisements.

Also, young educated men who were raised outside Accra and Tema very often do not know it until they come into contact with others who do at boarding-school in secondary school or at university. But that might be changing, as Accra-born students go to cities such as Ghana's second city Kumasi to study at university and so could help gain new diverse speakers for the language.

== History ==
The first European contact on the Gold Coast in West Africa was by Portuguese settlers in 1471 (15th century). A Portuguese pidgin was used in parts of Africa throughout the 16th and 17th centuries. This pidgin first developed when native speakers of West African languages were taken to Portugal in order to learn Portuguese for translating purposes during voyages. It is speculated that the Portuguese settlement on the Gold Coast may have been reason for the pidgin's continuation in West Africa. This Portuguese pidgin was used for 300 years along the Gold Coast "but probably never (developed) far beyond the jargon stage".

Nearly two-hundred years later the following their independence the Dutch "took over all of Portugal's possessions in West Africa by 1642" in the 17th century, however "few linguistic remnants" remained in West African Languages, dialects, or varieties. This could be because the Dutch did not settle amongst the West Africans they traded with.

The British colonized the Gold Coast of West Africa (now Ghana) in the 19th and 20th centuries from 1844 to 1957. The British had greater linguistic impact in West Africa as they were in greater contact with the indigenous people. GhaPE developed as masters required communication with their workers and was initially spoken by police corporals, watchmen, labourers, and domestic staff who were trying to keep pace with fast-paced English speakers.

Northern Ghanaians were some of the first to become pidgin speakers as they were late in accessing formal education and were employed by masters. "Migration of West Africans to and through Ghana in search of work" have impacted GhaPE development greatly in the last century. Migrant workers came to Ghana in the 1920s, and during a Nigerian oil boom that brought Ghanaian workers to Nigeria. Usage of GhaPE peaked in the 1980s as foreigners, including Ghanaians, were expelled from Nigeria. Nigerian settler influence has played a major role in the development and use of the language.

== Geographic distribution ==
=== Dialects and varieties ===
GhaPE is a variety of West African Pidgin English, signifying relationship with other regional pidgin varieties such as Nigerian Pidgin English. Though some word formations are regional in GhaPE, words are also sometimes borrowed from other regional varieties. GhaPE most commonly borrows "abi", "dey", and "ein" from Nigerian but uses its own word, "commot" frequently as well. Because of Nollywood influence, it is fairly common for Ghanaians to understand Nigerian Pidgin. Furthermore, unlike Nigerian pidgin, the use of Ghanaian pidgin is gendered.

Student Pidgin originated in prestigious Ghanaian all-male secondary schools in the 1960s–1970s, and there has been an ever-increasing number of female students now also using SP.

A particularly basic variety used by illiterate speakers is sometimes called "'Minimal Pidgin', (which was) sometimes used between Europeans and servants".

== Phonology ==
Phonology reflects the L1 of the speaker, in the case of GhaPE this includes Ghanaian languages from the Kwa language group.

For example, L1 speakers of Akan or Hausa replace /v/ with /b/ or /f/. Therefore, "seven" would be pronounced /sɛbɛn/.

== Grammar ==
=== Morphology ===
GhaPE has no standardized orthography; research into morphology, syntax and phonology is limited.

==== Derivation ====
Morphological processes of reduplication can derivate words in GhaPE. This process "affects verbs, nouns, attributive adjectives, time and manner adverbials, adverbs, and numerals". Reduplication can also show inflection by showing plurality of action amongst verbs.

==== Inflection ====
GhaPE nouns can also show plurality similar to substrate Ghanaian languages by adding the suffix -s.

==== Articles ====
- Definite article: dɛ
- Indefinite article: sɔm

Sometimes with singular nouns, the GhaPE indefinite article sɔm varies with the SGE "a" (/ɛ/), or is replaced with the Nigerian Pidgin English wan.

==== Pronouns ====
Ghanaian Pidgin English (GhPE) uses simplified, gender-neutral pronouns that function across subject, object, and possessive roles, often utilizing "am" for him/her/it and "dem" for plural subjects/objects. Key pronouns include I (I/me), you (you), e (he/she/it), wi (we), wona (you plural), and dem (they/them). The reflexive pronouns is formed by adding -sef "self" to the pronoun.

		Subject	Object	Reflexive pronouns	Possessive pronouns
1st	sg.	I I no know "I don't know"	me	masef "myself"	ma
1st	pl.	wi		wonasef "ourselves"	wona
2nd	sg.	you		jɔ̀sef "yourself"	yuh, jɔ̀
2nd	pl.	you		jɔ̀sef "yourselves", you menes "you guys"	
3rd	sg.	E or I (used for he, she, or it); E dey "He/she/it is there"	am (used for both singular him/her/it.)	einsef "himself, herself, itself"	ein
3rd	pl.	dem Dem see am "They saw him/her"		demasef "themselves"	dema

==== Tense, Aspect, and Mood ====
Grammatical distinctions related to tense, aspect, and mood are expressed through preverbal particles, which constitute a central component of GSPE morphology.

Aspect Markers
dey – progressive or habitual aspect

She dey read. "She is reading."

don – perfective or completive aspect

We don finish. "We have finished."

Tense Markers
go – future or irrealis

I go come tomorrow. "I will come tomorrow."

Modal Markers

fi(t) – ability or possibility

He fi(t) do am. "He can do it."

These particles may occur in combination, though ordering is constrained by usage conventions.

==== Negation ====
Negation in GSPE is analytic and typically expressed using the preverbal particle no or the negative perfect marker neva.

I no know. "I do not know."
She neva come. "She has not come."

Negation does not require auxiliary verbs or inflectional changes to the main verb.

==== Adjectives and adverbs ====
Adjectives and adverbs do not inflect for degree. Comparative and superlative meanings are expressed periphrastically using particles such as pass as comparative

This one good pass that one. "This one is better than that one."

Intensity may be expressed using adverbs such as too much or through reduplication.

==== Reduplication ====
Reduplication is a productive morphological strategy in GSPE and serves several semantic functions, including emphasis, intensity, repetition, and continuity.

small small "gradually"
quick quick "quickly, hurriedly"
talk talk "excessive talking"

This feature reflects substrate influence from Ghanaian languages, many of which employ reduplication extensively.

=== Syntax ===
==== Sentence Structure ====
The following example shows the declarative sentence structure SV(O).

A sabi buk.
I know book
"I am literate."

== Lexis ==
Amoako (2011) finds that most of the GhaPE lexis and some of its syntax comes from English, however it has likely been re-lexified by the more current Ghanaian English.

=== Examples ===
- "biz" (GhaPE) "ask"
- "kai" (GhaPE) "remember"
- "gbeketii" (GhaPE) "in the evening"

== Writing system ==
GhaPE is primarily spoken and, like many pidgins, is rarely written and has no standardized orthography.

== See also ==
- Coz Ov Moni - a musical film entirely in Ghanaian Pidgin English

== Bibliography ==
- Amoako, Joe K.Y.B. (1992). Ghanaian Pidgin English: In Search of Synchronic, Diachronic, and Sociolinguistic Evidence (PhD dissertation). University of Florida, Gainesville: University Press of Florida.
- Ewusi, Kelly Jo Trennepohl (2015). Communicational Strategies in Ghanaian Pidgin English: Turn-Taking, Overlap and Repair (PhD dissertation). Indiana University: Indiana University Press.
- Huber, Magnus (1 January 1995). "Ghanaian Pidgin English: An Overview". English World-Wide. 16 (2): 215–249. doi:10.1075/eww.16.2.04hub. ISSN 0172-8865.
- Huber, Magnus (1 January 1999). Ghanaian Pidgin English in its West African Context: a sociohistorical and structural analysis. Varieties of English Around the World. Amsterdam: John Benjamins Publishing Company. doi:10.1075/veaw.g24. ISBN 978-90-272-4882-4.
- Huber, Magnus (2004). "Ghanaian Pidgin English: morphology and syntax". In Schneider, Edgar W.; Burridge, Kate; Kortmann, Bernd; Mesthrie, Rajend; Upton, Clive (eds.). A handbook of varieties of English. Vol. Morphology and syntax. Mouton de Gruyter. pp. 866–73. ISBN 3-11-017532-0.
- Huber, Magnus (2004). "Ghanaian English: phonology". In Schneider, Edgar Werner; Burridge, Kate; Kortmann, Bernd; Mesthrie, Rajend; Upton, Clive (eds.). A handbook of varieties of English. Vol. Phonology. Mouton de Gruyter. pp. 842–65. ISBN 3-11-017532-0.
- Suglo, Ignatius G.D. (15 September 2012), Language Attitudes towards Ghanaian Pidgin English among Students in Ghana
- Yakpo, Kofi (7 August 2023), "The indigenization of Ghanaian Pidgin English", World Englishes, vol. 43, no. 1
