= Tyrone Marhguy =

Ghanaian student (born 2003)

Tyrone Iras Marhguy
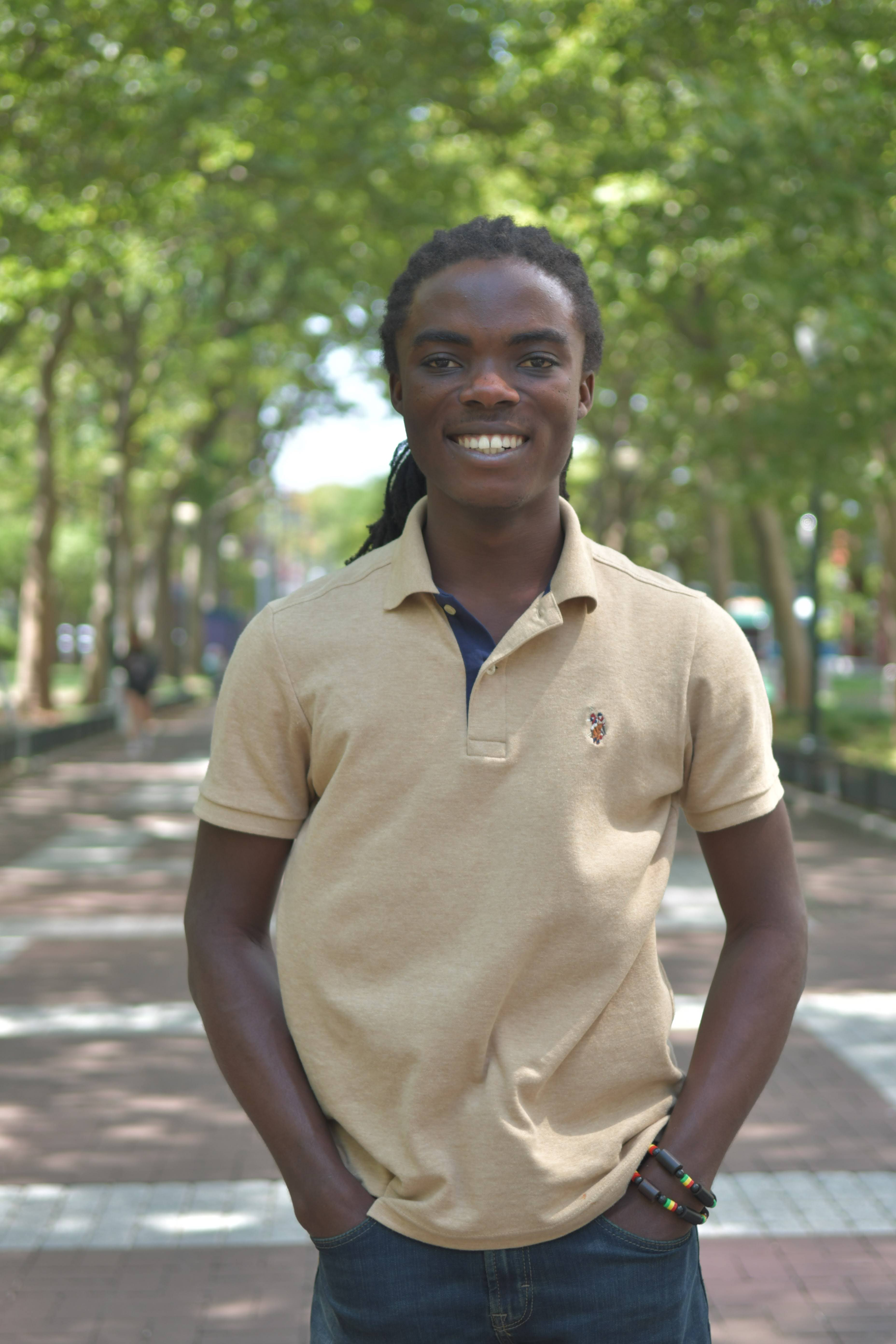
- Born: November 24, 2003 (age 22); Ghana
- Education: Achimota School, University of Pennsylvania
- Occupation: Student
- Known for: Achimota School admission case

Tyrone Iras Marhguy is a Ghanaian student known for a 2021 legal dispute with Achimota School, which denied him admission because he wore dreadlocks. The Accra High Court later ordered the school to admit Marhguy and another Rastafarian student, Oheneba Kwaku Nkrabea.

Marhguy later completed his secondary education at Achimota School and received eight A1 grades in the 2023 West African Senior School Certificate Examination (WASSCE).

== Education ==
Following the High Court's ruling, Marhguy enrolled at Achimota School, where he completed his secondary education.

In 2024, Marhguy received a full scholarship to study Computer Engineering at the University of Pennsylvania in the United States.

== Achimota School admission controversy ==
=== Background of admission denial ===
In March 2021, Achimota School denied admission to Tyrone Iras Marhguy because he wore dreadlocks. Marhguy's family said that the dreadlocks had religious significance and that requiring their removal would violate their religious beliefs. The school said that its regulations did not permit students to wear dreadlocks. Another Rastafarian student, Oheneba Kwaku Nkrabea, was also denied admission.

The fathers of both students, Raswad Menkrabea and Tereo Marhguy, publicly criticized the school's decision as violating their children's rights.

The Ghana Education Service initially directed Achimota School to admit the students but later withdrew the directive.

=== Public reaction ===
The admission dispute prompted public debate over religious freedom and school regulations. The National Association of Graduate Teachers (NAGRAT) publicly supported Achimota School's position, emphasizing adherence to school rules and discipline. The issue was also debated in the Parliament of Ghana.

=== Legal challenges ===
In response to the denial of admission, Tyrone Marhguy, through his father, filed a suit at the Human Rights Division of the Accra High Court on 31 March 2021. The lawsuit sought a declaration affirming Marhguy's right to education, right to dignity, and freedom to practice his religion, arguing that these rights were being violated by Achimota School's policy.

The suit named the board of governors of Achimota School and the Attorney-General as the primary respondents. In their defense, the Attorney-General's office argued that Marhguy's rights had not been infringed by the school's actions. Achimota School maintained that its regulations regarding hair were consistent with the Constitution of Ghana.

During the legal proceedings, an initial application for an ex parte injunction—which would have temporarily allowed Marhguy to be admitted to the school pending the outcome of the case—was dismissed by the court. The Attorney-General's department also raised a preliminary legal objection, challenging Marhguy's standing to bring the suit on the grounds that he had not yet submitted his admission forms and therefore could not be considered a student of the school.

=== Ghana High Court ruling in favor of Marhguy ===
On 31 May 2021, the Human Rights Division of the Accra High Court, presided over by Justice Gifty Agyei Addo, ruled in favor of Tyrone Iras Marhguy and Oheneba Kwaku Nkrabea, finding that Achimota School's decision to deny them admission on the basis of their dreadlocks was unconstitutional and a violation of their fundamental human rights, specifically their rights to education and dignity.

Justice Addo stated that there was no legal justification for restricting the students' right to education based on their religious practice of wearing dreadlocks. The court found that the Attorney-General's office had not provided a compelling legal reason to limit these rights and dismissed the argument that the students could not be considered for admission because they had not completed the necessary admission forms. Justice Addo described the suggestion that the students were not, in fact, students of the school as "preposterous".

The court ordered Achimota School to admit both students.

=== Appeal and aftermath ===
Achimota School appealed the High Court's decision. The Minister of Education publicly urged the school to reconsider the appeal.

Achimota School later withdrew its application for a stay of execution and allowed the students to enroll, while continuing to pursue its appeal.

== Academic achievements and projects ==
=== WASSCE results ===
Marhguy completed the 2023 West African Senior School Certificate Examination (WASSCE), receiving eight A1 grades.

=== International competitions ===
In 2023, MyJoyOnline reported that Marhguy was Ghana's top scorer and a gold medalist in the American Mathematics Olympiad. The same report said that he won a silver medal in the Vanda Science International Olympiad.

=== Engineering project ===
In 2026, GhanaWeb and 3Music reported that Marhguy had built an 8-bit arithmetic logic unit (ALU) as a personal engineering project.
