= Wanlov the Kubolor =

Ghanaian musician

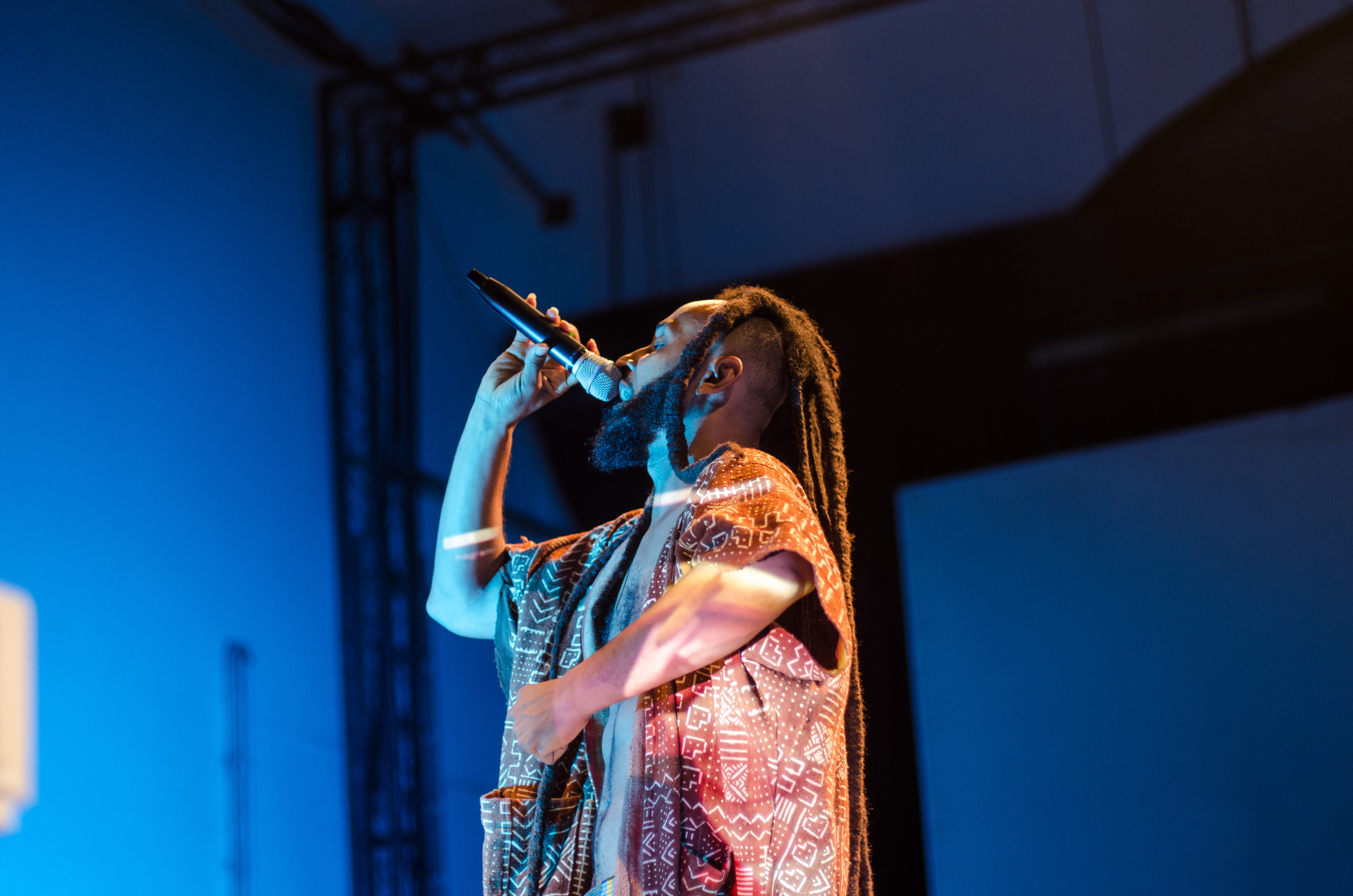
- Wanlov performing at a concert

Background information
- Born: Emmanuel Owusu-Bonsu; Ploiești, Romania
- Origin: Ghanaian Scalo Kay
- Genre: Afro Pop
- Occupations: Musician, Singer, Rapper
- Years active: 2007 – present
- Label: Fokn Inc

Emmanuel Owusu-Bonsu, known by his stage name Wanlov the Kubolor (born September 8, 1980) is a Ghanaian-Romanian musician and film director born to an Akan father and a Romanian mother. Kubolor is a Ga word that essentially means truant, but can be understood to be a wanderer or vagabond. He is the brother of the television show host, model, and musician Deborah Owusu-Bonsu.

== Early life ==
Kubulor's parents moved to Ghana before he was a year old, and he grew up in an artistic household where both parents were avid collectors of music and had an interest in the arts. He attended Adisadel College. It was while he was at Adisadel that he began rapping his favourite lyrics with high school friends and performing the local circuit in Cape Coast and Takoradi. It was here that his enduring musical partnership with the songwriter M3NSA was formed. He then moved to the United States for college in 2000 where he attended the University of Mary Hardin Baylor. He dropped out after two years of studying computer science and business administration, to dedicate himself fully to his musical career.

== Musical career ==
Kubulor released his debut album "Green Card" in late 2007 on his return to Ghana after a 7-year stay in the USA. Wanlov the Kubolor has collaborated with Gyedu-Blay Ambolley, Ghana's rap pioneer/Highlife legend, and Reggie Rockstone, the godfather of Hiplife, among other artists worldwide.

He has campaigned for the cause of OAfrica, a charity for out-of-home children and various similar causes, in particular, those linked to ecology or pollution in Ghana. In 2017, he told members of Blogging Ghana that he "is considering making a third installment to his Ghanaian Pidgin-English musical Coz Ov Moni".

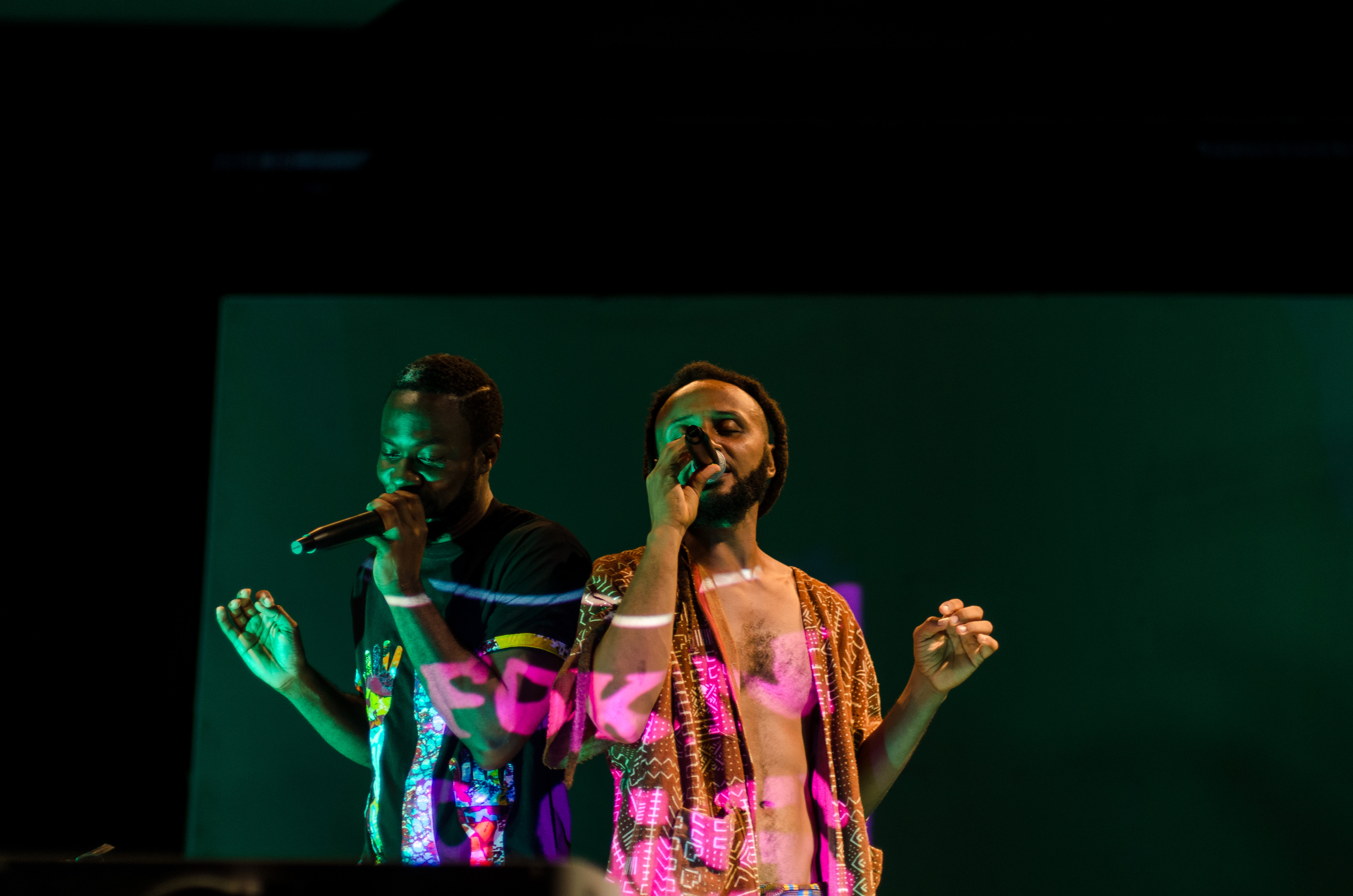
Fokn Bois performing at a concert

== Discography ==
=== Solo albums ===
- 2007 – "Green Card"
- 2010 – "Yellow Card – Stomach Direction"
- 2012 – "Brown Card – African Gypsy"
- 2017 – "Orange Card: Fruitopian Raps"

=== FOKN Bois Albums ===
- 2010 – “Coz Ov Moni” OS – Movie Soundtrack
- 2011 – “Coz Ov Moni – The Kweku Ananse Remix EP” – EP
- 2011 – “Coz Ov Moni – The DJ Juls Dw3t3i Remixes” – EP
- 2011 – "FOKN Dunaquest in Budapest" – EP
- 2012 – "FOKN Dunaquest in Budapest Remixes" – EP
- 2012 – “FOKN Wit Ewe” – Album
- 2013 – “Coz Ov Moni 2 (FOKN Revenge)” OS – Movie Soundtrack
- 2016 – "FOKN Ode to Ghana"
- 2019 – "Afrobeats LOL"

== Awards ==
- 2006 WCS International Song Contest – Winner (World) – "Human Being"
- 2006 International Songwriting Competition – Finalist (World) – "Never Die"
- 2007 Peacedriven Songwriting Award – Runner Up – "Human Being"
- 2008 Ghana Music Awards – Nominated for Discovery Of The Year, Record Of The Year (Smallest Time), Video Of The Year (Kokonsa), & Hip-hop Song Of The Year (Kokonsa)

== Activism ==
He is an activist for the rights of LGBT+ people in Ghana. In 2021, when the Ghanaian anti-LGBT bill was introduced, he spoke against the intent of the bill. He collaborated with Angel Maxine and Deborah Owusu-Bonsu to use their music as a form of activism against homophobia in Ghana.

He is also an activist against plastic waste Ghana.

In September 2023, He alleged that Sam George, one of the lead proponents of the Ghanaian anti-LGBT bill, was sponsored to push such laws in Ghana. He further claimed a linkage between the Ghanaian parliamentarian and the World Congress of Families.
