= Human rights in Ghana =

Human rights are "rights and freedoms to which all humans are entitled". Proponents of the concept usually assert that everyone is endowed with certain entitlements merely by reason of being human.

Ghana is a sovereign country in West Africa. It was a British colony until 6th March 1957, when it became the first country south of the Sahara to gain independence. The fundamental rights of a Ghanaian have been enshrined in the Chapter 5 of the 1992 Constitution. Amongst some of the rights protected under the 1992 constitution includes, protection of right of life, personal liberty, slavery and forced labour, protection of privacy of home and other property and protection of fundamental human rights and freedom. It also provides for women and child rights, economic and educational rights. Not only these but also, rights of the sick, rights of disabled people and property rights of spouses.

== LGBT rights ==
LGBT rights in Ghana are heavily suppressed. Physical and violent attacks against homosexual people are common, often encouraged by the media and religious and political leaders. Reports of young gay men being kicked out of their homes are also common. Despite the Constitution guaranteeing a right to freedom of speech, of expression, and of assembly to Ghanaian citizens, these fundamental rights are actively denied to LGBT people, especially for those who are homosexual.

== Religious freedom ==
The 1992 Constitution depicts that Ghana is a secular state and allows freedom of religion. In the preamble of the constitution, it reads “In the name of the Almighty God, We the people of Ghana in the exercise of our inalienable rights….“ This is also evident in the Ghana population Census report, Christianity accounts for 68.8% of the population, followed by Islam (15.9%) and traditional religion (8.5%). Only 6.1% of respondents claimed to have no religious affiliations. The remaining 0.7 percent of the population is made up of smaller religious groups, such as Buddhism and Eckankar. The right to religion belief and practice is guaranteed under Article 21(1)(c) of the 1992 Constitution, although while the freedom to believe is essentially unrestricted, the exercise of the belief is subject to restrictions in the interest of public safety, morality, etc. This is protected by the International Covenant on Civil and Political Rights' (ICCPR) Article 18 guarantee. Article 26 of the Constitution, which enables the exercise of customary practices with the qualification that any customary practice that violates the rights of any individual will be forbidden.

Although the constitution and law provide for freedom of speech and press, the government sometimes restricts those rights. In 2010, the police arbitrarily arrest and detain journalists. Some journalists practise self-censorship. In 2012, the constitution prohibits arbitrary interference with privacy, family, home, or correspondence, and the government respects these prohibitions in practice.

In 2002 the government of Ghana censored Internet media coverage of tribal violence in Northern Ghana.

In 2023, the country was scored 3 out of 4 for religious freedom. A notable example is Tyrone Marhguy, whose 2021 legal dispute over religious expression in school admissions was widely reported in international media.

== Prison conditions ==
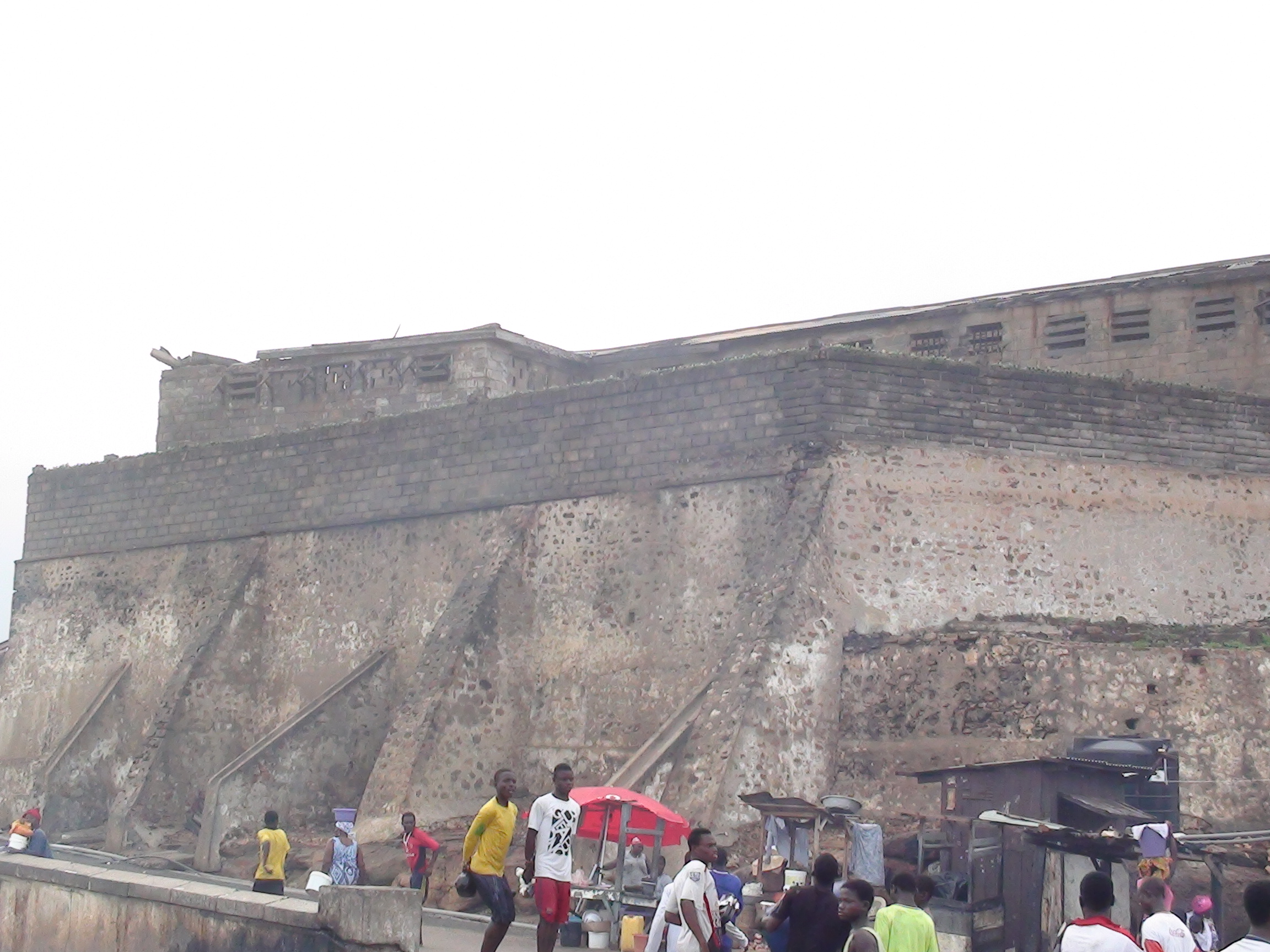
The almost 400 years old James Fort Prison in Accra was in use as a prison until 2008. It was originally built for 200 slaves, but housed over 740 male and female prisoners.

Squalid conditions, poor food, and overcrowding in Ghana's prisons were called "cruel, inhuman and degrading treatment," by the UN in 2013. The extent of prison overcrowding is estimated to be higher than the government's official figures. Prison authorities use a system where inmates known as "black coats" whip other misbehaving prisoners with canes.

== Historical situation ==
The following chart shows Ghana's ratings since 1972 in the Freedom in the World reports, published annually by Freedom House. A rating of 1 is "most free" and 7 is "least free".^{1} In the 2020s, the Freedom in the World reports are rated from 1 to 4.

There also follows a list of treaties agreed by the government authorities.

| Year | Political Rights | Civil Liberties | Status | President^{2} |
| 1972 | 6 | 6 | Not Free | Kofi Abrefa Busia |
| 1973 | 7 | 6 | Not Free | Ignatius Kutu Acheampong |
| 1974 | 7 | 5 | Not Free | Ignatius Kutu Acheampong |
| 1975 | 7 | 5 | Not Free | Ignatius Kutu Acheampong |
| 1976 | 7 | 5 | Not Free | Ignatius Kutu Acheampong |
| 1977 | 6 | 5 | Partly Free | Ignatius Kutu Acheampong |
| 1978 | 5 | 4 | Partly Free | Ignatius Kutu Acheampong |
| 1979 | 4 | 4 | Partly Free | Fred Akuffo |
| 1980 | 2 | 3 | Free | Hilla Limann |
| 1981 | 6 | 5 | Not Free | Hilla Limann |
| 1982^{3} | 6 | 5 | Not Free | Jerry Rawlings |
| 1983 | 6 | 5 | Not Free | Jerry Rawlings |
| 1984 | 7 | 6 | Not Free | Jerry Rawlings |
| 1985 | 7 | 6 | Not Free | Jerry Rawlings |
| 1986 | 7 | 6 | Not Free | Jerry Rawlings |
| 1987 | 7 | 6 | Not Free | Jerry Rawlings |
| 1988 | 6 | 6 | Not Free | Jerry Rawlings |
| 1989 | 6 | 5 | Not Free | Jerry Rawlings |
| 1990 | 6 | 5 | Not Free | Jerry Rawlings |
| 1991 | 6 | 6 | Not Free | Jerry Rawlings |
| 1992 | 5 | 5 | Partly Free | Jerry Rawlings |
| 1993 | 5 | 4 | Partly Free | Jerry Rawlings |
| 1994 | 5 | 4 | Partly Free | Jerry Rawlings |
| 1995 | 4 | 4 | Partly Free | Jerry Rawlings |
| 1996 | 3 | 4 | Partly Free | Jerry Rawlings |
| 1997 | 3 | 3 | Partly Free | Jerry Rawlings |
| 1998 | 3 | 3 | Partly Free | Jerry Rawlings |
| 1999 | 3 | 3 | Partly Free | Jerry Rawlings |
| 2000 | 2 | 3 | Free | Jerry Rawlings |
| 2001 | 2 | 3 | Free | Jerry Rawlings |
| 2002 | 2 | 3 | Free | John Kufuor |
| 2003 | 2 | 2 | Free | John Kufuor |
| 2004 | 2 | 2 | Free | John Kufuor |
| 2005 | 1 | 2 | Free | John Kufuor |
| 2006 | 1 | 2 | Free | John Kufuor |
| 2007 | 1 | 2 | Free | John Kufuor |
| 2008 | 1 | 2 | Free | John Kufuor |
| 2009 | 1 | 2 | Free | John Kufuor |
| 2010 | 1 | 2 | Free | John Atta Mills |
| 2011 | 1 | 2 | Free | John Atta Mills |
| 2012 | 1 | 2 | Free | John Atta Mills |
| 2013 | 1 | 2 | Free | John Dramani Mahama |
| 2014 | 1 | 2 | Free | John Dramani Mahama |
| 2015 | 1 | 2 | Free | John Dramani Mahama |
| 2016 | 1 | 2 | Free | John Dramani Mahama |
| 2017 | 1 | 2 | Free | John Dramani Mahama |
| 2018 | 1 | 2 | Free | Nana Addo Dankwa Akufo-Addo |
| 2019 | 2 | 2 | Free | Nana Addo Dankwa Akufo-Addo |
| 2020 | 2 | 2 | Free | Nana Addo Dankwa Akufo-Addo |
| 2021 | 2 | 2 | Free | Nana Addo Dankwa Akufo-Addo |
| 2022 | 2 | 2 | Free | Nana Addo Dankwa Akufo-Addo |

| Year | Political Rights | Civil Liberties | Overall score | Status | President^{2} |
| 2023 | 4 | 3 | 80% | Free | Nana Addo Dankwa Akufo-Addo |

| Treaty | Organization | Introduced | Signed | Ratified |
| Convention on the Prevention and Punishment of the Crime of Genocide | United Nations | 1948 | - | 1958 |
| International Convention on the Elimination of All Forms of Racial Discrimination | United Nations | 1966 | 1966 | 1966 |
| International Covenant on Economic, Social and Cultural Rights | United Nations | 1966 | 2000 | 2000 |
| International Covenant on Civil and Political Rights | United Nations | 1966 | 2000 | 2000 |
| First Optional Protocol to the International Covenant on Civil and Political Rights | United Nations | 1966 | 2000 | 2000 |
| Convention on the Non-Applicability of Statutory Limitations to War Crimes and Crimes Against Humanity | United Nations | 1968 | - | 2000 |
| International Convention on the Suppression and Punishment of the Crime of Apartheid | United Nations | 1973 | - | 1978 |
| Convention on the Elimination of All Forms of Discrimination against Women | United Nations | 1979 | 1980 | 1986 |
| Convention against Torture and Other Cruel, Inhuman or Degrading Treatment or Punishment | United Nations | 1984 | 2000 | 2000 |
| Convention on the Rights of the Child | United Nations | 1989 | 1990 | 1990 |
| Second Optional Protocol to the International Covenant on Civil and Political Rights, aiming at the abolition of the death penalty | United Nations | 1989 | - | - |
| International Convention on the Protection of the Rights of All Migrant Workers and Members of Their Families | United Nations | 1990 | 2000 | 2000 |
| Optional Protocol to the Convention on the Elimination of All Forms of Discrimination against Women | United Nations | 1999 | 2000 | 2011 |
| Optional Protocol to the Convention on the Rights of the Child on the Involvement of Children in Armed Conflict | United Nations | 2000 | 2003 | 2014 |
| Optional Protocol to the Convention on the Rights of the Child on the Sale of Children, Child Prostitution and Child Pornography | United Nations | 2000 | 2003 | - |
| Convention on the Rights of Persons with Disabilities | United Nations | 2006 | 2007 | 2012 |
| Optional Protocol to the Convention on the Rights of Persons with Disabilities | United Nations | 2006 | 2007 | 2012 |
| International Convention for the Protection of All Persons from Enforced Disappearance | United Nations | 2006 | 2007 | - |
| Optional Protocol to the International Covenant on Economic, Social and Cultural Rights | United Nations | 2008 | 2009 | - |
| Optional Protocol to the Convention on the Rights of the Child on a Communications Procedure | United Nations | 2011 | 2013 | - |

== See also ==
- Internet censorship and surveillance in Ghana
- Women in Ghana

== Notes ==
1.Note that the "Year" signifies the "Year covered". Therefore the information for the year marked 2008 is from the report published in 2009, and so on.
2.As of January 1.
3.The 1982 report covers the year 1981 and the first half of 1982, and the following 1984 report covers the second half of 1982 and the whole of 1983. In the interest of simplicity, these two aberrant "year and a half" reports have been split into three year-long reports through interpolation.
