= Criminalization of transgender people =

Classification of transgenderism as a criminal offence

Criminalization of transgender people is the use of criminal law to punish trans people for their gender expression or for activities that would not be punished if committed by cisgender individuals. Examples include bathroom bills that make it illegal for trans people to use the bathroom associated with the gender that they present as, criminalization of gender-affirming healthcare, anti-crossdressing laws, and enforcement of criminalization of homosexuality against transgender people.

== Ghana ==
In Ghana in May 2026, an anti-LGBTQ+ bill passed in the country's parliament, which criminalises identifying as lesbian, gay, bisexual, transgender or queer and can result in a sentence of three years in prison. As part of the bill those who identify as an "ally" (i.e. a supporter) of LGBTQ+ people could also be sentenced to prison. The bill has been sharply criticised by international organisations. Human Rights Watch condemned the bill, calling on Ghana's government to, "uphold the international legal protections that guarantee every Ghanaian equality, non-discrimination, freedom of expression, and privacy." As of 30 May 2026, the bill still needs to be signed by president of Ghana, John Mahama before it becomes law. Mahama has indicated that he will support the bill's passage.

== See also ==
- Gender self-identification
- Human rights
- Legal recognition of non-binary gender
- Legal status of transgender people
- LGBTQ people in prison
- LGBTQ rights by country or territory
- Right to personal identity
- Transgender inequality
- Transgender rights movement
- Transphobia
