= Henry Kwasi Prempeh =

Ghanaian lawyer

- Born
- Education: University of Ghana; Baylor University; Yale Law School
- Occupation: Lawyer
- Title: Executive Director, Ghana Centre for Democratic Development
- Predecessor: Prof E Gyimah-Boadi

Henry Kwasi Prempeh (born July 17) is a Ghanaian lawyer, educationalist, and the current executive director of the Ghana Center for Democratic Development (CDD-Ghana).

== Education ==
Prempeh graduated with a BSc admin. degree from the University of Ghana. He obtained a master's degree in business administration (MBA) from Baylor University. In 1993, he graduated from Yale Law School, where he served as notes editor on the Yale Law Journal.

== Career ==
After graduating from law school, Prempeh worked in private practice as a law firm associate. He worked at O'Melveny & Myers LLP and later Cleary, Gottlieb, Steen and Hamilton in Washington, D.C. In 1998, he was appointed to be a board member of the newly formed Ghana Center for Democratic Development (CDD-Ghana) and later served as the director of legal policy and governance from 2001 to 2003.

In 2003, Prempeh became a professor at Seton Hall University School of Law in Newark, New Jersey. He remained there until 2015, after securing tenure in 2008.

From 2010 to 2011, he was a visiting professor at the newly established law school at the Ghana Institute of Management and Public Administration (GIMPA) in Accra. He has written and consulted on the issues of constitutionalism, governance, legal policy, and democracy in Ghana and the rest of Africa. He was selected as a Reagan-Fascell Democracy Fellow by the National Endowment for Democracy in 2011. As of 2018, he was a member of the Ghana Law Reform Commission.

On February 1, 2018, Prempeh was appointed as the new executive director for the Ghana Centre for Democratic Development (CDD-Ghana), after the retirement of the previous director, E. Gyimah-Boadi.

== See also ==
- Ghana Center for Democratic Development (CDD-Ghana)
- Afrobarometer
