= LGBT+ Rights Ghana =

Ghanaian organization

- Formation: July 13, 2018; 8 years ago
- Founder: Alex Kofi Donkor
- Headquarters: Accra
- Location: Ghana
- Region served: West Africa
- Official language: English
- Executive Director: Alex Kofi Donkor
- Website: https://www.lgbtqrightsgh.org/

LGBT+ Rights Ghana is a Ghanaian organization that advocates for LGBT rights in Ghana. The organization has engaged in some forms of activism including creating the Ghana Gay Blackmail List to combat the blackmail and extortion of gay men. In 2021, the organization opened its office in Accra which led to public outrage and opposition from anti-LGBT organizations in Ghana. LGBT+ Rights Ghana's Executive Director is Alex Kofi Donkor.

== Activism ==
LGBT+ Rights Ghana was founded in 2018 as a cyber activism blog. In 2020, it created a social media page called "Ghana Gay Blackmail List" to fight blackmailing and extortion of gay men by cataloguing blackmailing incidents and providing a link for LGBT persons who have been blackmailed to submit reports. Alex Kofi Donkor, Executive Director of LGBT+ Rights Ghana stated that the page was created after many LGBT Ghanaians were assaulted, threatened at gunpoint, and robbed by blackmailers, but received no assistance from the police.

In 2021, LGBT+ Rights Ghana opened its office in Accra and invited some diplomats, celebrities, activists, and LGBT+ persons to the event which was also intended to raise funds. This event caused outrage across the country. Additionally, there was opposition from anti-gay organizations which called on the government to shut down the organization and asked for the Inspector General of Police to arrest all persons associated with the organization. In response, LGBT+ Rights Ghana issued a statement asserting that LGBT persons in Ghana are entitled to human rights, including freedom of association. On 25 February, their centre was shut down by police.

In March 2021, the organization condemned the public request to criminalize LGBT rights activism in Ghana.

In June 2022, LGBT+ Rights Ghana has its billboards pulled down for being considered criminal, according to some members of parliament. The organization promises to take legal action against the illegal pulling down of its billboards.
