= 2019 Ghana Music Awards =

20th VGMA
- Date: May 18, 2019
- Location: Fantasy Dome; Accra, Ghana
- Country: Ghana
- Hosted by: Kwami Sefa Kayi; Berla Mundi
- Website: ghanamusicawards.com

The 20th edition of the Vodafone Ghana Music Awards was held on 18 May 2019 at the Grand Arena in Accra. The event was co-hosted by Kwami Sefa Kayi, who hosted from 1999 to 2007, and Berla Mundi.

== Performers ==
Artist(s)	Song(s)
Burna Boy	"Apata"
Kuami Eugene; Amakye Dede	"Never Dey Carry Last" "Wish Me Well" "Kwani Kwani" "Zoblazo" (Meiway) "Sokoo Na Mmaa Pe"
Medikal	"Too Risky" "Wrowroho" "Omo ada" "Father"
Efya	
Kula	"Amen" "MUSIGA High School"
Kwesi Arthur; Kofi Mole; Quamina MP	"Woara" "Mensah"; Wiase Ye De
KiDi	"Adiepena" "Thunder" "Don't Keep Me Waiting"
Sarkodie; Kofi Mole; Amerado; Frequency; CJ Biggerman; O' BKay	"Biibiba" "Can't Let You Go"
King Promise	"CCTV"
Adjetey Anang	Poem
Barima Sidney; Adwoa Smart	"Apuskeleke" "W'asei" "Scent No" "Obiaa Nnye Obiaa" "African Money"
Samini	"Gyae Shye" "Linda" "Where My Baby Dey" "Samini"
Alison Hinds	"Roll it Gal"

== Presenters ==
- John Dumelo
- Chief Dele Mamudu
- KiDi
- Cynthia Quarcoo Jumu
- Patricia Obo-Nai
- Nana Ansah Kwao
- Shirley Ayorkor Botchway
- Nacee
- Lydia Forson
- James Gardner
- Kiki Benson
- Diana Hopeson
- Abeiku Santana
- Zapp Mallet
- Lovin C
- Obour
- Nathaniel Attoh
- Mariam Owusu Poku - Miss Malaika Ghana 2018
- Zynnel Zuh
- Salma Mulmin
- Qojo Qupid

== Winners and nominations ==
Winners highlighted in Bold

Artiste of the Year	Highlife Song of the Year
Joe Mettle; Sarkodie; Stonebwoy; Shatta Wale; Kuami Eugene; King Promise	Dada Hafco – 'Yebewu Nti'; KiDi – 'Thunder'; **Shatta Wale – "My Level"**; Kumi Guitar – "Betweener'; Kwesi Arthur – "Woara"; King Promise featuring Sarkodie & Mugeez – "CCTV"; Adina – 'Killing Me Softly'
Hiplife Song of the Year	Gospel Song of the Year
Medikal featuring King Promise – "Ayekoo"; Sarkodie featuring King Promise – "Can't Let You Go"; Quamina MP featuring Kwesi Arthur & Yung C – "Wiase Ye De" (Remix); DopeNation – "Eish"; Flowking Stone – "Blow My Mind"; Stonebwoy featuring Medikal, Kwesi Arthur & Darko Vibes – "Kpoo Keke"; **Yaa Pono featuring Stonebwoy – "Obiaa Wone Master"**; Strongman featuring Kuami Eugene – "Baby Girl"	Joyce Blessing – "I Swerve You"; KODA – "Hosanna"; I. K. Aning – "Bobolebobo"; Joe Mettle – "My Everything"; Obaapa Christy – "W'asua Me"; Bethel Revival Choir – "Agba Dza"; **Diana Hamilton – "Mo Ne Yo"**
Reggae/Dancehall Song of the Year	Afropop Song of the Year
Maccasio – "Dagomba Girl" feat Mugeez; **Shatta Wale – "Gringo"**; Stonebwoy – "Top Skanka"; Samini – "Obaa"	King Promise featuring Wizkid – "Tokyo"; **Guilty Beatz featuring Mr Eazi, Pappy Kojo & King Promise – "Akwaaba"**; Kwesi Arthur featuring KiDi – "Don't Keep Me Waiting"; Article Wan featuring Patapaa – "That Thing"; Wendy Shay – "Uber Driver"; DJ MicSmith – "Yenkor" feat Kwesi Arthur; MzVee featuring Yemi Alade – "Come and See My Moda"; Shatta Wale featuring SM Militants – "Thunder Fire"
Hip hop Song of the Year	Sound Engineer of the Year
Medikal featuring Sarkodie & Omar Sterling – "How Much" (Remix); Sarkodie featuring Amerado, Kofi Mole, Tulenkey, Yeyo, 2Fingers, Frequency, LJ, O'Bkay & CJ Biggerman – "Biibi Ba"; KoJo Cue featuring Worlasi, Kwesi Arthur, Shaker, Kay-Ara, Temple & C-Real – "Wole" (Remix); **Kwesi Arthur – "Anthem"**; Joey B – "Stables" featuring La Meme Gang; R2Bees featuring Kwesi Arthur, King Promise, Darkovibes, B4bonah, Humble Dis, Spacely, Medikal & Rjz – "Boys Kasa"	**Francis Osei (Akwaboah – "Hye Me Bo)**
Reggae/Dancehall Artist of the Year	Highlife Artist of the Year
**Stonebwoy**; Epixode; Samini; AK Songstress; Shatta Wale	KiDi; **Kuami Eugene**; Akwaboah; King Promise; Adina
Songwriter of the Year	Record of the Year
Fuse ODG – "Bra Fie"; Teephlow – "Forgive"; Akwaboah – "Hye Me Bo"; **King Promise – "CCTV"**; Trigmatic – "Where We Dey Go"; Stonebwoy – "Tomorrow"	Fuse ODG featuring Damain Marley – "Bra Fie"; **Akwaboah – "Hye Me Bo"**; Okyeame Kwame – "Made In Ghana"; Trigmatic – "Where We Dey Go"; Stonebwoy – "Tomorrow"
Best Video of the Year	Hiplife/Hiphop Artist of the Year
Joey B featuring La Meme Gang – "Stables" (Director David Duncan); KoJo Cue & Shaker featuring Kwesi Arthur (Director E. Kumodzi) – "Up & Awake"; Kirani Ayat – "Guda" (Dir David Nico-Sey); M.anifest featuring King Promise Director Makere Thekiso – "Me Ne Woa"; Shatta Wale – "Gringo" (Director Sesan); Fuse ODG featuring Damain Marley (Director Edgar Stevens) – "Bra Fie"; Sarkodie featuring Amerado, Kofi Mole, Tulenkey, Yeyo, 2Fingers, Frequency, LJ, O'Bkay & CJ Biggerman – "Biibi Ba" (Director Babs); **MzVee featuring Yemi Alade – "Come and See My Moda" (Director Xbills Ebenezer)**	Patapaa; **Medikal**; Sarkodie; Kwesi Arthur; R2Bees; La Meme Gang
Male Vocalist of the Year	Female Vocalist of the Year
King Promise; **KiDi – "Thunder"**; Akwaboah; Luigi Maclean	eShun; **Efya – "Hold Me Down"**; Cina Soul; Adina; MzVee; Diana Hamilton
Group of the Year	Rapper of the Year
R2Bees; DopeNation; La Meme Gang; **Bethel Revival Choir**	**Medikal**; M.anifest; Teephlow; Sarkodie; Obibini
Best Collaboration of the Year	African Artist of the Year
Adina featuring Kuami Eugene – "Killing Me Softly"; Sarkodie featuring King Promise – "Can't Let You Go"; King Promise featuring Sarkodie & Mugeez – "CCTV"; GuiltyBeatz featuring Mr Eazi, Pappy Kojo & Patapaa – "Akwaaba"; MzVee featuring Yemi Alade – "Come and See My Moda"; Yaa Pono featuring Stonebwoy – "Obiaa Wone Master"; **Stonebwoy featuring Medikal, Kwesi Arthur, Darko Vibes & Kelvyn Boy – "Kpoo Keke"**; DJ Vyrusky featuring Kuami Eugene & Mayorkun – "Never Carry Last"	Davido; Wizkid; Mr Eazi; Sauti Sol; Cassper Nyovest; **Burna Boy**
Best New Artist of the Year	Song of the Year
Quamina MP; Kelvyn Boy; Eddie Khae; **Wendy Shay**; La Meme Gang; DopeNation	King Promise featuring Sarkodie & Mugeez – "CCTV"; Eddie Khae – "Do the Dance"; Isaac Kwabena Aning – "Akwaaba"; Guilty Beatz featuring Mr Eazi, Pappy Kojo & Patapaa – "Akwaaba"; Kidi – "Thunder"; Kuami Eugene – "Wish me Well"; Sarkodie featuring King Promise – "Can't Let You Go"; Stonebwoy featuring Medikal, Kwesi Arthur, Darko Vibes & Kelvyn Boy – "Kpoo Keke"; Shatta Wale – "My Level"; Kwesi Arthur – "Woara"; MzVee featuring Yemi Alade– "Come and See My Moda"; Tic featuring Kuami Eugene– "Kwani Kwani" (Part 2)
Album of the Year	Best African Collabo
**Kuami Eugene – Rockstar**; Akwaboah – Matters of the Heart; Wendy Shay – Shay on You; Diana Hamilton – IBelieve; Samini – Untamed; Shatta Wale – Reign	DopeNation featuring Olamide – "Naami" (Remix); **Guilty Beats featuring Mr Eazi, Patapaa & Pappy Kojo – "Akwaaba"**; Too Fan featuring Patoranking & Sarkodie – "My Girl" Remix; King Promise featuring Wizkid – "Tokyo"; Stonebwoy featuring Casper Nyovest – "Wame"; MzVee featuring Yemi Alade – "Come and see my Mother"; Shatta Wale featuring Olamide – "Wonder"
Instrumentalist of the Year	Producer of the Year
Unda Beats; **Mizter Okyere**; Enoch Owuraku; Emmanuel Bludo	Kaywa; Killbeatsz; **Kuami Eugene**; DDT; MOG Beats
Artiste of the Decade Award
Becca; Efya; Joe Mettle; No Tribe and Nacee; Okyeame Kwame; R2Bees; Samini; **Sarkodie**; Shatta Wale; Stonebwoy

== Special awards ==
- Best Traditional Artiste of the Year: Kwan Pa Band
- Lifetime Achievement Award:

- Prof. Kofi Abraham
- Obouba J. A. Adofo
- Mary Ghansah

- Unsung category: Kula

== Disturbance and break in the show ==
At the 2019 Vodafone Ghana Music Awards a fracas broke out on stage between two Ghanaian reggae and dancehall artistes Stonebwoy and Shatta Wale. Stonebwoy was announced as winner for the Reggae and Dancehall Artistes for the year. Whiles receiving his award on stage, Shatta Wale and his team approached the stage which resulted in the brawl and putting the event on hold for a few minutes for calm to prevail. During the confrontation Stonebwoy was seen wielding a gun on stage during the disturbance that night. The show was continued after the two musicians were ushered out of the room by the security at the venue. The event continued with a performance by fellow reggae and dancehall artistes from Ghana Samini. The incident further prevented the event organizers from announcing the winners for the Vodafone Most Popular Song of the Year and Artiste of the Year. The two musicians Stonebwoy and Shatta Wale has been later invited by the Ghana Police Service for interrogation.
