= The Atuu Show =

Ghanaian TV programme

The Atuu show is a Ghanaian television program hosted by Abeiku Santana on United Television (UTV). It's a chat program on television that features interviews with celebrities and well-known figures in the entertainment sector.

== Interviewed ==
- Nana Ama mcbrown
- Abraham Attah
- Jocelyn Dumas
- Obaapa Christy
- Kuami Eugene
- KiDi
- Piesie Esther
- Mzbel
- Rosemond Brown
- Tracy Boakye
- Fred Amugi
- Efia Edo
- Sista Afia
- Xandy Kamel
- Ebony Reign
- Nii Sika Brown
- Okyeame Kwame
- Yvonne Nelson
- Daina Asamoah
- John Boye
- Kwadwo Nkansah
- Afia Schwarzenegger
- Guru
- Emelia Brobbey
- Benedicta Gafah
- Kwame A Plus
- Patapaa
- Wanlov the Kubolor
- Nikki Samonas
- Doris Sakeitey
- Shatta Wale
- Samini
- maame serwaa
- Ebony Reign
- Wendy shay
- King Promise
- Big Akwes
- Diana Antwi Hamilton
- Archbishop Salifu Amoako
- Dope Nation
- Nana Opoku Kwarteng
- Eazzy
- Bukom Banku
- Tacha
- Kofi Mole
- Bismark The Joke
- Eno Barony
- Timothy Bentum
- Joyce Blessing
- Omar Sheriff Captan
- Vicky Zugah
- Adina Thembi
- Kelvin Bwoy
- StrongManBurner
- Biggie Boss Oteele
- Kwaku Twumasi
- Lord Kenya
