= Xbills Ebenezer =

Ghanaian music video director and filmmaker

- Born: Annor Ebenezer; 17 April 1987 (age 39); Kukurantumi, Eastern Region, Ghana
- Education: Ofori Panin Senior High School
- Occupations: music video director, Filmmaker
- Years active: 2007–present
- Known for: founding Xpress Philms
- Parent(s): Miss Juliet Gladys Osafo (mother); Mr Fred K. Annor (father)
- Website: xpressphilmsgh.com

Xbills Ebenezer (born Annor Ebenezer) is a Ghanaian music video director and filmmaker. He is the founder and CEO of Xpress Philms, a production company that specialises in production of film, television, and music video. Xbills has directed music videos for recording artists across an array of genres including,Kuami Eugene, Bisa Kdei, Kidi, Shatta Wale, Becca, Kofi Kinaata, Edem, Eazzy, Gurunkz, VVIP, Adina, Obrafour, Dobble, Mzvee, AK Songstress, Keche, Tic Tac, Wendy Shay, Mr Drew, Dopenation, Sarkodie, Lasmid, Jupitar, Stonebwoy and more.

== Life and career ==
Ebenezer was born to Miss Juliet Gladys Osafo and Mr Fred K. Annor on 17 April 1987 in Kukurantumi-Akim town in the Eastern Region of Ghana. He was the second last of the six siblings. He began school at Asafo-Akim and later joined Ofori Panin Senior High School where he studied Visual Arts. At Ofori Panin Senior High School, Xbills Ebenezer won the Best Visual Arts student in his class for a couple of times. Inspired by the colorful and artistic nature of the Michael Jackson culture during his high school days, he began singing to beats and miming to songs. He dreamed of creating fictional movies that could be as wild, and more horrible than Michael Jackson's. As young as he was, he would sketch movies on pieces of paper in pictorial forms; which were well understood by anyone who read them. These pictorial forms equally had good literary elements. He started full-time music video production in 1997, and his breakthrough video was Gurunkz "Lapaz Toyota" which was shot in 2011.

== Videos directed ==
This is a list of music videos directed by Xbills Ebenezer. Over 37 music videos are currently listed here.

Year	Video	Artist
2011	"Lapaz Toyota"	Gurunkz
2012	"Seke"	Dr. Slim feat. Dobble
2013	"Boys Abre/Alkayida"	Gurunkz
2014	"Obaa Jackie Chan"	Gurunkz
2014	"Here We Go Again"	Edem
2014	"Pum Pum"	TicTac feat Edem
2014	"Mpaebo"	Gurunkz
2014	"Mama Ne Dada"	D2
2014	"Nkwadaa Nkwadaa"	Gurunkz
2014	"Baba God"	Gurunkz
2014	"Pooley Swag"	Gurunkz
2014	"Aboa Onni Dua"	Obrafour
2014	"Pimpinaa"	Obrafour
2014	"Enemies"	Jupitar
2014	"Skolom"	VVIP
2015	Otan Hunu	Dobble
2016	"Bie Gya"	Shatta Wale
2016	"Hello"	Akwaboah Jnr feat Sarkodie
2016	"Beshiwo"	Becca (Ghanaian singer) feat Bisa Kdei
2016	"Life"	Bisa Kdei feat Patoranking
2016	"Na Na"	Eazzy feat Stonebwoy
2016	"Meba Be Tia Wo"	Gurunkz
2016	"Hw3"	Becca (Ghanaian singer) feat Bisa Kdei
2016	"Susuka"	Kofi Kinaata
2016	"Mansa"	Bisa Kdei
2016	"PumPum"	RudeBwoy Ranking
2016	"Kakai"	Shatta Wale
2016	"Holiday"	AK Songstress
2016	"Baby"	Petrah feat Reekado Banks
2016	"Fefeefe"	EL
2016	"One Tin"	Eazzy
2016	"Kpakposhito"	Eazzy
2016	Hello	Akwaboah feat. Sarkodie
2017	"Boom Boom"	Kuami Eugune
2017	"Mawuli"	2Fresh4God
2017	"Feeling"	Kurl Songz feat Ebony Reigns
2017	"Bronya"	Wutah
2017	"Rewind"	MzVee feat Kuami Eugene
2017	Daavi	Mzvee
2017	We Run Dem	MzVee ft Article Wan
2018	"Come And See My Moda"	MzVee feat. Yemi Alade
2018	Mamee	Efya ft. Mr Eazi
2018	Bend Down	MzVee feat. Kuami Eugene
2019	Dw3	Mr Drew ft Krymi & Sarkodie
2019	Fire Burn	Kwamz & Flava Feat. Sarkodie
2019	Shooo (Remix)	Kwamz & Flava Feat. Medikal & Joey B
2019	Weather	Sista Afia ft Medikal & Quamina MP
2020	"Enjoyment"	KIDI
2020	No Dulling	Keche Feat. Kuami Eugene
2020	Let Me Know	Mr Drew
2020	Turn Up	Kuami Eugene
2020	Wedding Song	Wendy Shay feat. Kuami Eugene
2020	Pray For The World	Wendy Shay
2020	Duna	Eazzy Feat Quamina Mp
2020	Here For You	Vanilla Karr
2020	Bestie	Queen Ayorkor Ft. Kelvyn Boy
2020	Paper	Sista Afia feat. Victor AD
2021	Mood	Mr Drew
2021	Shoulder	Adina feat. Mr JazziQ
2021	Dollar On You	Kuami Eugene
2021	Today	DopeNation
2021	Shuperu	Mr Drew feat. KiDi
2021	S3k3	Mr Drew feat. Medikal
2021	Good Mood	Keche ft Fameye
2021	Mind Your Business	Dopenation
2021	Amen	Kuami Eugene
2021	Abodie	Captain Planet (4x4) feat. Kuami Eugene
2022	''Metua''	Amerado feat. Kuami Eugene
2022	"Friday Night"	Lasmid
2022	"Sweetie"	Kwabena Kwabena
2022	"Jo"	FBS feat. Mr Drew
2022	Blow	Mona 4Reall
2022	Picture	Akwaboa ft. Medikal
2022	All day	Highly spiritual music
2023	Cryptocurrency	Kuami Eugene Feat. Rotimi
2023	Love You	Bisa Kdei feat. KiDi
2023	Something Must Happen	Keche
2023	Carry Go	Sista Afia
2023	My Darling	Akwaboah Feat. Kwabena Kwabena
2023	Fate	Kuami Eugene
2023	Love Again	Kyei Nwon
2023	Falling	Fati Music ft. Kuami Eugene
2024	Monica	Kuami Eugene
2024	Daniella	Theo Ranks
2024	Party	Kyei Nwom
2024	More of You	Benedicta Kumi
2024	Odogwu	FBS ft. Afronita & Siifa
2024	Ose Ompe	Akwaboah
2024	Sum) mi (Love me)	Mr. Drew ft. Medikal
2024	Sexxy Red	STR Gwalla
2025	Happy	Freddy Blaze
2025	Welcome to Africa	Medikal
2025	Amen	MOG Music
2025	Instagram	Kuami Eugene
2026	I will	Slik

== Awards ==
Year	Award Ceremony	Award Presented	Nominated work/Recipient	Result	Ref
2024	Telecel Ghana Music Awards	Best video and best Director of the year	Himself	Won	
2016	4syte TV Music Video Awards	Best Edited Video of the Year	Guru – Samba	Won	
2019	Ghana Actors and Entertainers Awards	Best video director of the year	Himself	Won	
2021	4syte TV Music Video Awards	Best video director of the year	Himself	Won	
2020	Vodafone Ghana Music Awards	Best music video of the year 2019	MzVee ft. Yemi Alade – come and see my mother	Won	
