= Maccasio =

Ghanaian musician

- Also known as: Maccasio
- Born: Sherif Abdul Majeed; 6 April 1995 (age 31); Tamale, Ghana
- Origin: Tamale
- Genres: Afro pop, Hip hop, hiplife
- Occupations: Rapper, Songwriter
- Years active: 2014-present
- Label: 69 Entertainment/Zola Music
- Member of: Zola Music
- Spouse: Ihsan (married 2025–present)

Sherif Abdul Majeed, (born April 6, 1995) known by his stage name Maccasio, is a Ghanaian Hip Hop, Hiplife, and Afropop recording artist and entrepreneur. He is from the Kingdom of Dagbon, in the Northern Region of Ghana. Maccasio raps and sings in his native language Dagbani with the ability to mix it with terms in English and Twi. He has performed on stages with artists such as Davido, Shatta Wale, Samini, Stonebwoy, Medikal and VVIP.

Maccasio has been working with Apprise Music Distribution, a music selling platform for his online music distribution and monetization.

Maccasio was awarded a plaque for his achievement with Apprise Music Distribution.

== Musical career ==
Maccasio realized his music talent at the age of 14. He raps mainly in his native language Dagbani with a blend of English, Hausa and Twi. His signature tune Anye kan laraa is one of the most popular signature tune in the northern region. Maccasio has three albums to his credit.

Maccasio launched his debut album Boussu in March 2014. His second album, Oshihila Nkpe was launched in 2015 at the Picona Gardens.

His third studio album dubbed Ninsala was launched on 19 August 2017 at the Tamale Sports Stadium. Maccasio hosted Shatta Wale at the Tamale Stadium during his 'Too big concert' in Tamale, an event that saw the stadium filled to capacity.

Maccasio released his 4th album Zero to hero on 4th January 2019

Maccasio's 5th album was released on 3 November 2022

Maccasio was the headline artist for the 'Northern explosion concert'on February 25, 2017. A pre-independence concert he hosted at the Accra sports stadium. The show saw performance from big international acts such as Sherifa Gunu, Kofi Kinaata Guru, Rudeboy, and Dr Cryme.

Maccasio pulled a crowd of nearly 18,000 fans to the Tamale Stadium during his peace concert in Tamale.

Maccasio filled up the Bokum boxing arena with total shut down concert on October 28, 2018, with a capacity of 4,000 in attendance. He filled the Bokum arena again with outstanding 4,000 fans with his kings concert on February 5, 2022.

Maccasio's planned musical concert with Mr. P of PSquare fame was cancelled in July 2026 following the passing of the overlord of Dagbon - Yaa Naa Mahama Abukari II.

== Endorsements ==
In 2016, Maccasio signed a one-year deal as the ambassador for Giant malt for the Northern sector of Ghana. The singer also has a five-year deal as an ambassador for Modern Security Consult Ghana. In April 2022, he signed an eight-month deal with Infinix Mobile to become its ambassador for the Northern sector.

== Discography ==
- 2014: Bousu
- 2015: O Shihila Nkpe
- 2017: Ninsala
- 2020: Zero 2 Hero
- 2022 Glory

== Major singles ==
- Pad Featuring Morgan Produced by BlueBeatz
- That Girl Featuring Patapaa Produced by Ojah Drumz
- Lyrical Stamina Featuring Stone Brain Produced by Tizzle
- Mma[MOM] Featuring Ahmed Adams Produced by MOG Mixed by Tizzle
- Dagomba Girl Featuring Mugeez (R2bees) Produced by MOG Mixed by PossiGee
- Too Big Featuring Shatta Wale Produced by Da Maker
- Inside Featuring Zeal (VVIP) Produced by DJ Breezy
- Work Featuring Kofi Kinaata Produced by KinDee
- 69 Fans Produced by Blue Beatz
- Igwe Produced by Blue Beatz
- NINSALA prod by tizzle
- make am ft shatta wale

== Videography ==
Year	Title	Director	Ref
2018	That Girl Featuring Patapaa	Joe Gameli	
2018	Lyrical Stamina Featuring Stone Brain	Joe Gameli	
2018	Mma[MOM] Featuring Ahmed Adams	Joe Gameli	
2018	Dagomba Girl Featuring Mugeez (R2Bees)	Salifu Abdul Hafiz	
2017	Bohasi (Questions)	Joe Gameli	
2017	Thank You	Joe Gameli	
2017	Ninsala	Joe Gameli	
2017	Long John	Joe Gameli	
2017	No Puncture Featuring Kawastone	Joe Gameli	
2017	Inside Featuring Zeal(VVIP)	Salifu Abdul Hafiz	
2016	Fired	MNC Films	
2016	Work Featuring Kofi Kinaata	Prince Dovlo	
2016	Tinaaba 1	Steve Gyamfi	
2016	One Boy One Girl	Abdul Razak Marvelous	
2016	Oshihilankpe	Steve Gyamfi	
2016	Waa (Dance)	Somed Cent	

== Awards and nominations ==
=== West Africa Awards ===
Year	Nominee / work	Award	Result
2019	Himself	Next Rated Artist Of The Year	

=== 3RD TV Music Video Awards ===
Year	Nominee / work	Award	Result
2019	Best Afro Pop Video	Make Am Ft Shatta Wale	

=== Ghana Music Awards SA ===
Year	Nominee / work	Award	Result
2019	Himself	Hip-life Artist Of The Year	
2019	Himself	Best Rapper Of The Year	

=== Ghana Music Awards UK ===
Year	Nominee / work	Award	Result
2019	Dagomba Girl	Raggae/Dancehall Song of the Year	Won

=== Vodafone Ghana Music Awards ===
Year	Nominee / work	Award	Result
2019	Dagomba Girl	Raggae/Dancehall Song of the Year	Nominated

=== 3Music Awards ===
Year	Nominee / work	Award	Result
2019	Himself	Fan Army of The Year	Nominated

=== Ghana Music Awards SA ===
Year	Nominee / work	Award	Result
2018	Himself	PROMISING ARTIST OF THE YEAR	Won

=== 3RD TV Music Video Awards ===
Year	Nominee / work	Award	Result
2018	Himself	BEST AFRO POP VIDEO	Won

=== 3Music Awards ===
Year	Nominee / work	Award	Result
2018	Himself	Breakout Act of The Year	Won
2018	Himself	Facebook Star of The Year	Nominated

=== People's Celebrity Awards ===
Year	Nominee / work	Award	Result
2017	Himself	Favourite Social Media Personality	Won
2017	Himself	Favourite Male Musician of the Year	Nominated
2017	Too Big	Favourite Song of the Year	Nominated

=== Northern Entertainment Awards (NEA) ===
Year	Nominee / work	Award	Result
2017	Himself	Overall Artiste of The Year	Nominated
2017	Himself	Artiste Of The Year	Nominated
2017	Himself	Best Rapper Of The Year	Won
2017	Ko Nin Neey	Best Collaboration	Won
2017	Too Big	Most Popular Song	Nominated

=== Northern Music Awards (NMA) ===
Year	Nominee / work	Award	Result
2016	Himself	Highlife/Hiplife Artiste of the Year	Nominated
2016	Himself	Best Rapper of the Year	Won
2016	Oshihilankpe	Most Popular Song of the Year	Nominated
2016	Himself	Artist of the Year	Nominated

Ghana Northern Music Awards (GNMA)

Year	Nomineee / Work	Award	Result
2025	Himself	Overall Artiste of the Year	Won
2025	Mani	Rapper of the Year	Nominated
2025	Himself	Fanbase of the Year	Won
2025	Wedding Day	Collaboration of the Year	Nominated
2025	Mani	Hip Hop Song of the Year	Nominated
2025	Corner There	Viral Video of the Year	Won
2025	Wedding Day	Most Popular Song of the Year	Nominated
