= Salifu =

Salifu is a West African masculine given name and surname. Notable people with the name include:

== Given name ==
- Salifu Adam Braimah (1965–2026), Ghanaian politician
- Salifu Dagarti (1931–1964), Ghanaian police officer and presidential bodyguard
- Salifu Abdul Hafiz (born 1990), Ghanaian film and music video director
- Salifu Ibrahim (born 2000), Ghanaian footballer
- Salifu Jatta (born 1995), Gambian footballer
- Salifu Joel (born 1967), Nigerian teacher and politician
- Salifu Mudasiru (born 1997), Ghanaian footballer
- Salifu Saeed, Ghanaian politician
- Salifu Yakubu (1919–??), Ghanaian politician and diplomat

== Surname ==
- Ameen Salifu (born 1965), Ghanaian politician
- Amidu Salifu (born 1992), Ghanaian football midfielder
- Imoru Salifu, Ghanaian politician
- Latif Salifu (born 1990), Ghanaian football player
- Mary Salifu Boforo (1951–2025), Ghanaian Member of Parliament
- Moro Salifu (born 1998), Ghanaian professional footballer
- Razak Salifu (born 1988), Ghanaian football midfielder
- Seidu Salifu (born 1993), Ghanaian football player
