= Ofori Amponsah =

Ghanaian music artist

- Born: Samuel Ofori Amponsah; 2 March 1974 (age 52); Agogo, Ashanti Region, Ghana
- Genres: Hiplife, Highlife
- Occupation: Singer-songwriter
- Years active: 1999–present
- Label: 4 Reez Westside Entertainment

Samuel Ofori Amponsah (born March 2, 1974), also known by the name Mr. All 4 Real, is a Ghanaian singer-songwriter from Agogo, Ashanti Region, Ghana. Throughout his career, he has released fourteen solo albums, the most recent being "Million Dollar," which was released in 2020. He is regarded as one of Ghana's best 21st-century highlife musicians.

He won seven awards in one night at the 2006 VGMA awards, including 2005 Artist of the Year, and has a combined total of 17 Ghana Music Awards nominations, making him one of the highest nominated artists. Samuel Ofori Amponsah performed internationally in London, New York, Chicago, and Sierra Leone. His music has a heavy R&B influence. He has collaborated with the likes of Kofi Nti, Barosky, K. K. Fosu and Daddy Lumba. Some of his most popular songs are "Asew", “Lady,” “Emmanuella,” "Odwo", and “Otoolege.”

== Early life ==
Samuel Ofori Amponsah was born March 2, 1974, to Johnson Kwadwo Ofori and Georgina Nkansah, in Agogo, Ashanti Region, Ghana. He is known to be an advocate for education and was enrolled in school before the age required. He began his education at an Agogo practice school and later attended Konongo Odumase Senior High School, where he found his passion for writing poetry. His poems were later used in his songs, most notably in his song "Asew." He dropped out of school and later met music bigwig Daddy Lumba, gaining access into the music industry. At an early age, he discovered his love for music. He began writing at the age of 13 after being inspired by the talented music legend Michael Jackson, which may account for his R&B style of music.

== Music ==
=== 1999-2004: Early career ===
Amponsah started working with Daddy Lumba in 1999. He gained entry into the music industry when he collaborated with Daddy Lumba on the album Wo Ho Kyere. Although he earned a shot in the limelight for this collaboration, his career did not fully launch until 2000. He released his first album with Owusek Productions in 2001, titled Asew, which had eight tracks, plus a bonus instrumental of the song "Asew." He later released the albums Meprawo and Rakia in 2002 and 2004.

=== 2005-10: Recognition ===
In 2005, Amponsah released his single "Otoolege," which was included in the album of the same name. He collaborated with producer Appietus and musicians K.K. Fosu, Kofi Nti, and Barosky on the song. Amponsah won big the next year at the Ghana Music Awards with seven awards. "Otoolege" won him 2005 VGMA Artist of the Year.

In early 2006, he was set to perform for Ghanaian President John Kufuor, but reportedly failed to show up for the event. He made a public apology to the president and the people of Ghana for the mishap. He later performed for the president's 68th birthday in December of that same year.

He performed a big show in Liberia in 2007 to an overwhelming crowd of fans. Some have compared his presence in Liberia to the presence of Michael Jackson. He met with Mayor Ophelia Huff Saytumah of Monrovia, Agriculture Minister Solomon Hedd-Williams, and Presidential Special Assistant Madina Wiesseh while in Liberia. In the same year, he released three albums: The Return of Kofi B, Emmanuella, and Odwo. After 2007, he released four albums in the span of three years.

=== 2013-16: New image ===
In 2013, Amponsah made the decision to leave secular music. He released a gospel album in 2014 called The Gospel According to Ofori. His decision included becoming a pastor. He founded the Family of Faith and Love Ministries to spread the word of God. It wasn't long before he switched back to secular music, claiming he would save souls through his love songs. After announcing his decision to go back to secular music, he began rehearsing and preparing his fans for a new experience and new image for his future performances. He was reported to have spent a month in seclusion at his home in order to focus on preparing for his stage performances.

The 2015 release of his single “Alewa” earned him a nomination for 2015 Highlife Artist of the Year and 2015 Highlife Song of the Year. The song was in collaboration with Sarkodie, a fellow Ghanaian music artist and rapper. The pair performed the song at the 2015 Rapperholic concert. “Alewa” is featured on Amponsah's album Songs of Solomon, which includes the hits “Not Falling,” “Serious,” and “Wonkoaa.” The eleven-track album features music producers Kaywa, Appietus, and Bodo Staiger.

=== 2016-Present: Comeback ===
In 2016 Amponsah released several singles including "Fab3gye" with Paa Kwasi and Atom (produced by Appietus), and "TinTin" in collaboration with Samini.

On April 21, 2017, Amponsah released yet another love song, "Seventeen," featuring the vocals of Kwabena Kwabena. The song was produced by Kaywa. His second release of 2017 was "Dangerous," a collaboration with singer Akwaboah Jnr and Black Nayaka, produced by Cedi Gh.

== Politics ==
In December 2017 Amponsah announced that he will likely enter politics and seek a parliamentary Asante Akim seat in the 2020 election.

== Controversy ==
=== "Pastor Alewa" ===
After moving from secular music to more spiritual music, Amponsah claimed making hit gospel music was more difficult than making secular music. He later returned to secular music and faced criticism for his actions. After releasing “Alewa,” featuring Sarkodie, he has been called “Pastor Alewa.” His manager, Frank Agyekum, claimed Amponsah wanted to go back to making love songs.

A fellow artist, Criss Waddle, openly criticized Amponsah, questioning his religious calling. Sound engineer, Morris D’voice, had a different opinion as he defended Amponsah and called for more acceptance for the musician.

He performed his first show after coming back to secular music in 2015.

=== Bible verse ===
More controversy and criticism ensued after Amponsah failed to recite a single bible verse in an interview with Bola Ray on Starr 103.5 in 2015. He later claimed memorizing bible verses is meant for children and that he learned bible verses from the heart.

=== Suicide hoax ===
Amponsah also made news on Valentine's Day 2015 when he was connected to a suicide hoax. His management released a statement after the false suicide report, stating Amponsah was alive and claimed the report was not a publicity stunt and that they would open an investigation into the report.

== Collaborations ==
Amponsah has collaborated with many artists. His earliest collaboration was with Daddy Lumba for Lumba's album Wo Ho Kyere. His song "Odwo" from the album of the same name featured Samini, formerly known as Batman Samini, a Ghanaian reggae and dancehall artist. He also created the songs "Otoolege" and "Rakia" with artists K.K. Fosu and Kofi Nti. Barosky was also featured on "Otoolege." Other collaborations include Voltage, Dobble, and D-Black, for the songs "Chemistry," "Alomo," and "Aben Dada." One of his 2016 singles, "Alewa," which garnered much attention, featured Sarkodie.

Title	Artist	Year
Woho Kyere	Daddy Lumba	1999
"Rakia"	KK Fosu, Kofi Nti	2004
"Otoolege"	Appietius (producer), K.K. Fosu, Barosky, Kofi Nti	2005
"Koforidua Flowers"	Kofi B	2007
"Odwo"	Samini	2007
"Emmanuella"	Appietus (producer)	2007
"Chemistry"	Voltage	2010
"Alewa"	Sarkodie	2015
"Alomo"	Dobble	2016
"Aben Dada"	DJ Breezy (producer) D-Black	2016
"Tintin"	Samini	2016
"Fabegye Gulf"	Appietus (producer) Paa Kwasi (Dobble), Atom	2016
"Seventeen"	Kaywa (producer) Kwabena Kwabena	2017
"Dangerous"	Cedi Gh (producer) Akwaboah Jnr	2017
"You Make Me Wonder"	Peewezel (producer) Dr. Pushkin	2023

== Discography ==
=== Albums ===
Title	Album details
Woho Kyere (with Daddy Lumba)	Released: 1999
Taxi Driver (Collaboration album with Kofi B)	Released: 2000
Asew	Released: May 20, 2001 Owusek Productions
Meprawo	Released: June 11, 2002 Owusek Productions
Rakia	Released: March 7, 2004 4 Reez Westside Entertainment
The Return of Kofi B (Collaboration album with Kofi B)	Released: March 30, 2007 4 Reez Westside Entertainment
Otoolɛgɛ	Released: October 30, 2005 4 Reez Westside Entertainment
Odwo	Released: October 15, 2007 Supermusic
Emmanuella	Released: March 30, 2007 4 Reez Westside Entertainment
Paul Anatem	Released: December 5, 2008 Supermusic
Ayefro Ntefere	Released: March 7, 2010 4 Reez Westside Entertainment
Khala	Released: August 27, 2010 4 Reez Westside Entertainment
The Gospel According to Ofori	Released: October 20, 2014 4 Reez Westside Entertainment
Songs of Solomon	Released: December 4, 2015 4 Reez Westside Entertainment
Million Dollar	Released: September 11, 2020 4 Reez Westside Entertainment

== Videography ==
Title	Producer
"Seventeen" (2017)	4 Reez Westside Entertainment Kenn Ayiah (Director)
"TinTin" (2016)	4 Reez Westside Entertainment
"Emmanuella"	4 Reez Westside Entertainment
"Otoolege"	4 Reez Westside Entertainment
"Lady"	4 Reez Westside Entertainment
"Sardine"	
"Odwo"	Supermusic
"Cinderella"	
"Abelle"	4 Reez Westside Entertainment
"Broken Heart"	4 Reez Westside Entertainment
"Odo Nwom"	4 Reez Westside Entertainment
"Rakia"	4 Reez Westside Entertainment
"Sampson and Delilah"	
"Chemistry"	4 Reez Westside Entertainment
"Hello"	4 Reez Westside Entertainment
"Nyame Asem"	4 Reez Westside Entertainment
"Khala"	4 Reez Westside Entertainment
"Puduo"	4 Reez Westside Entertainment
"Asew"	Owusek Productions
"Bohobio"	

== Filmography ==
Title	Year	Featured song
Delilah	2009	"Samson and Delilah"

== Awards and nominations ==
=== Ghana Music Awards ===
Title	Song	Award Year	Status
Artist of the Year	"Otoolege"	2006	Won
Song of the Year	"Otoolege"	2006	Won
Most Popular Song of the Year	"Otoolege"	2006	Won
Album of the Year		2006	Won
Highlife Artist of the Year	"Otoolege"	2006	Won
Highlife Song of the Year	"Otoolege"	2006	Won
Best Collaboration of the Year	"Rakia"	2006	Won
Highlife Artist of the Year	"Alewa"	2016	Nominated
Highlife Song of the Year	"Alewa"	2016	Nominated

=== MTV Africa Music Awards ===
Title	Song	Award Year	Status
Listener's Choice Award	"Odwo"	2008	Nominated
