= Kay Bryn =

Ghanaian Musician

Evans Abraham Atta, known professionally as Kay Bryn (born July 6) is a Ghanaian afrobeats musician and songwriter.

== Early life ==
Kay was born to Ghanaian parents but moved to London in 2015 where he became a runway model and featured on at the London Fashion week.

== Musical influence ==
He mentions Okyeame Kwame, Daddy Lumba, and Ofori Amponsah as the musicians who influence his sound.

== Career ==
Kay began his career at an early age but it wasn't until the release of his maiden single, Rain on Me in 2020. This was quickly followed by the release of other singles Sherry Coco, Muse and Baa Sumo Mi in 2021. The later earned him a nomination for the 'Afropop Song of the Year" at the Western Music awards in that year . He was also nominated in the "Best New Artiste" category but lost out to eventual winner, Naana Blu.

In 2022, he released a single Hyira Me and featured DopeNation in 2022 and tackled infidelity in modern relationships with his single, Pack and Go.

In the year 2021, he was nominated in the UK Based Uncovered category at the Ghana Music Awards UK. The following year, he was nominated in UK-Based New Artist of the Year at the same award show.

== Career recognitions ==
Year	Event	Prize	Recipient	Result	Ref
2021	Western Music Awards	Afropop Song of the Year	"Baa Sumo Mi"	Nominated	
2021	Western Music Awards	Best New Artist	"Himself"	Nominated	
2022	Western Music Awards	Western Diaspora Artist of the Year	"Himself"	Nominated	
2024	Ghana Music Awards UK	UK-Based Afrobeats/Afropop Artiste of the Year	"Himself"	Nominated	
2024	Ghana Music Awards UK	UK-Based Afrobeats/Afropop Song of the Year	"Fresh Boy"	Nominated	
2024	Ghana Music Awards UK	UK-Based Artiste of the Year	"Himself"	Nominated	
