= Breaking news (disambiguation) =

Breaking news interrupts scheduled programming to report the latest details of a current event.

Breaking news may also refer to:

== Film and television ==
- Breaking News (2004 film), a Hong Kong film directed by Johnnie To
- Breaking News (2012 film), a Kannada film by Nagathihalli Chandrashekar
- Breaking News (American TV series), a 2002 American drama series
- Breaking News (Pakistani TV series), a 2023 Pakistani television series
- Breaking News, the title that Australian TV series Frontline was known as when it aired on PBS in the United States

== Music ==
- Breaking News (album), by Samini, 2015
- "Breaking News" (song), by an artist credited as Michael Jackson, 2010
- "Breaking News", a song by Half Man Half Biscuit from Cammell Laird Social Club, 2002
- "Breaking News", a song by Shinee from Boys Meet U, 2013
- "Breaking News (Skit)", a song by Eminem from The Death of Slim Shady (Coup de Grâce), 2024

== Other uses ==
- Breaking News (horse), an American Saddlebred show horse

== See also ==
- Breaking the News (disambiguation)
- Broken News, a 2005 British satirical comedy series
- "Toronto's breaking news", a slogan used by the television news channel CP24
