= Aftown =

Music download and streaming service

aftown
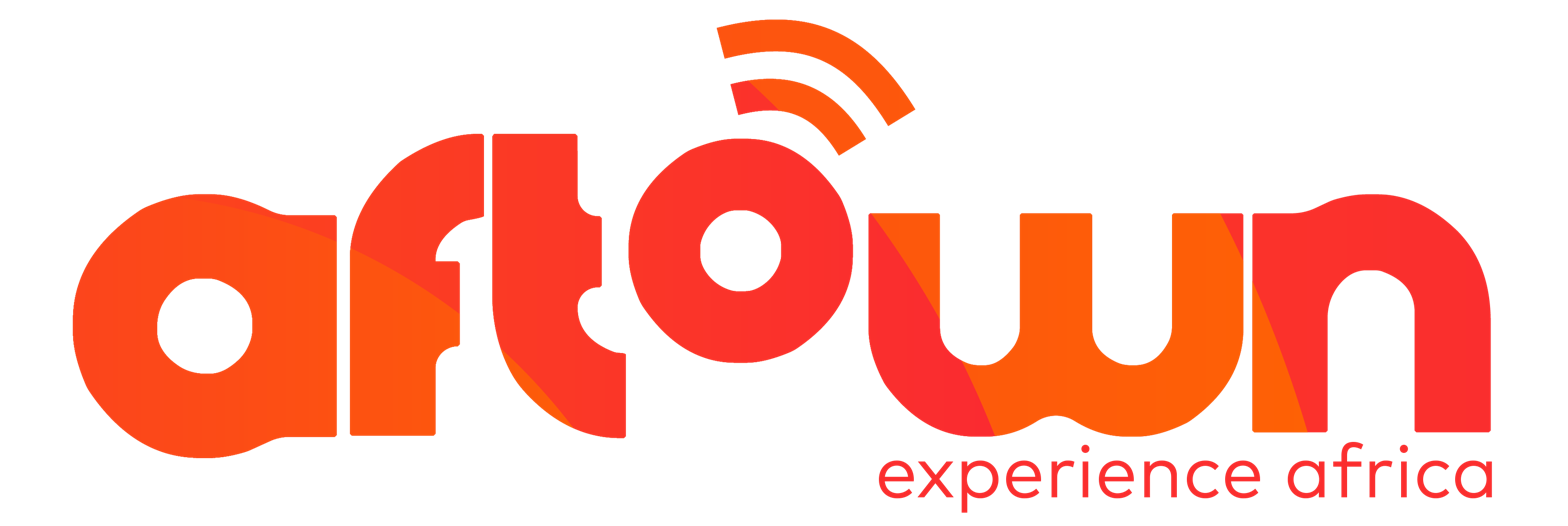
- Website type: Music Streaming
- Available in: English
- Headquarters: Accra, Ghana
- Country of origin: Ghana
- Industry: Music, Podcasts, Radio and Videos
- Services: Music streaming
- Website: aftownmusic.com
- Commercial: Yes
- Registration: Required
- Launched: October 21, 2016; 10 years ago
- Current status: Active
- Native clients on: Web, Android, iOS
- Written in: PHP, React Native

aftown is an Internet-based music download and streaming service. Aftown as a company consists of two main platforms: streaming and downloads. The aftown app is free and generates revenue through premium subscriptions and advertisement from free users.

It is currently the top indigenous music streaming and download site in West Africa.

== History ==
In September 2016, the technation team had a collaboration with M.anifest to release his album "No Where Cool " album on 15ghana.com, an eCommerce website. The album upon release sold over a thousand copies all over the country within a week. The sale of M.anifest's album presented several challenges especially in regard to delivery since the project involved the sale CDs. These challenges and the overall success of the project led the technation gh team to come up with the idea for aftown coined from the words Africa and Town.

In October, 2016 aftown was officially launched. Upon its launch aftownmusic had its first major sales from Sonnie Badu's album "Soundz Of Afrika". Aftown went on to sell albums from top Ghanaian artists like Sarkodie, MzVee, Akan, M.anifest, Joe Mettle, EL, Stonebwoy, Okyeame Kwame, Adomaa, Teephlow.

Aftown generated about GHC 80 000 in artist revenue in its first year.

Due to feedback from aftown users, a streaming platform was introduced in June 2017. Aftownmusic's first big project was with Akan's album "Onipa Akoma" which was a huge success .

== Business Model ==
Aftownmusic is a free music streaming platform. Revenue is generated from premium subscriptions and advertisements for free users. Aftown encourages users to support indigenous artists by avoiding piracy and streaming local content .Artistes gain revenue from their total play counts.

=== Accounts And Subscriptions ===
| Type | ads | Videos | Offline Download | Ability To Create Playlist | Library | radio |
|---|---|---|---|---|---|---|
| Aftown for Free | Yes | No | Yes | Yes | Yes | Yes |
| Aftown Premium | No | Yes | Yes | Yes | Yes | Yes |

Aftownmusic has two distinct apps on both android and iOS for premium and free streaming. The premieum app which has no ads is called aftownmusic premium and the free one is called aftown -Discover and stream new music for free. Both apps are available on google store and the app store.

The free accounts in aftownmusic have perpetual existence, however users can move to premium at any time. The duration for premium accounts vary and users can choose between daily, weekly, monthly and yearly packages.

The payment methods available on aftownmusic include Mobile Money (available on all Ghanaian network providers), Credit/Debit Cards, and MTN Mobile Airtime.

== Industry Initiatives ==
Aftownmusic has hosted several workshops with musicians all over the country in a bid to educate them about branding and revenue making streams. Aftown has also worked with several local artists to produce EPs and concerts.

=== aftown Referrals ===
aftown Referrals allows bloggers and anyone place a special link to their web pages that redirects to aftown's digital shop. When a purchase is made via this unique link the bloggers get a cut of each sale.

=== The aftownshow ===
Currently, aftownmusic has a music show on DGN TV. The aftownshow plays a chart of the top 10 most streamed songs on aftownmusic. There is also the listening session, where guests are invited to listen to random songs and give their comments. Mainstream and upcoming artists are invited for an interview to talk about their works and themselves. The aftown show was cancelled and replaced with a brand new show dubbed aftown BUZZ!

=== aftownBUZZ! TV Show ===
aftownBUZZ is a DGN program focused on entertainment news.

=== MTN Partnership ===
In January 2019, MTN Ghana invited aftownmusic to its 3rd MTN digital Music Conference to help local artists monetize their music. Aftown was introduced to artists as a platform for revenue generation. The event was held in 3 major cities in Ghana.

In February of the same year, aftownmusic in collaboration with MTN Ghana introduced an alternative payment method for MTN subscribers. MTN subscribers can choose to pay using their MTN airtime at a subsidized price.

=== aftown For Brands ===
Aftown for brands seeks to create an avenue for brands and businesses to advertise their products and services to its users. The ads are only visible to free users. The ads presented on aftownmusic are in the form of audio and pictures. Aftown for brands also offers artist promotion packages for artists to promote their works across the platform.

=== aftown studio ===
This free service by aftown provides artists with templates to advertise their music on all social media platforms.

=== aftown version 3 launch ===
The new app, dubbed aftown 3.0, included news feature for press, reward points for users and artists, expanded playlist curation options, and new avenues for artists to promote their music and increase revenue. The new app presents a composite music ecosystem, featuring an interface that resembles social media profiles with stylized features for signups, sharing, and uploads.

== Platforms ==
Aftownmusic has apps available for Android and iOS. Aftownmusic also features a web player, for those who are unable to – or do not want to – download an app.
