= Salifu Abdul Hafiz =

Ghanaian musical artist

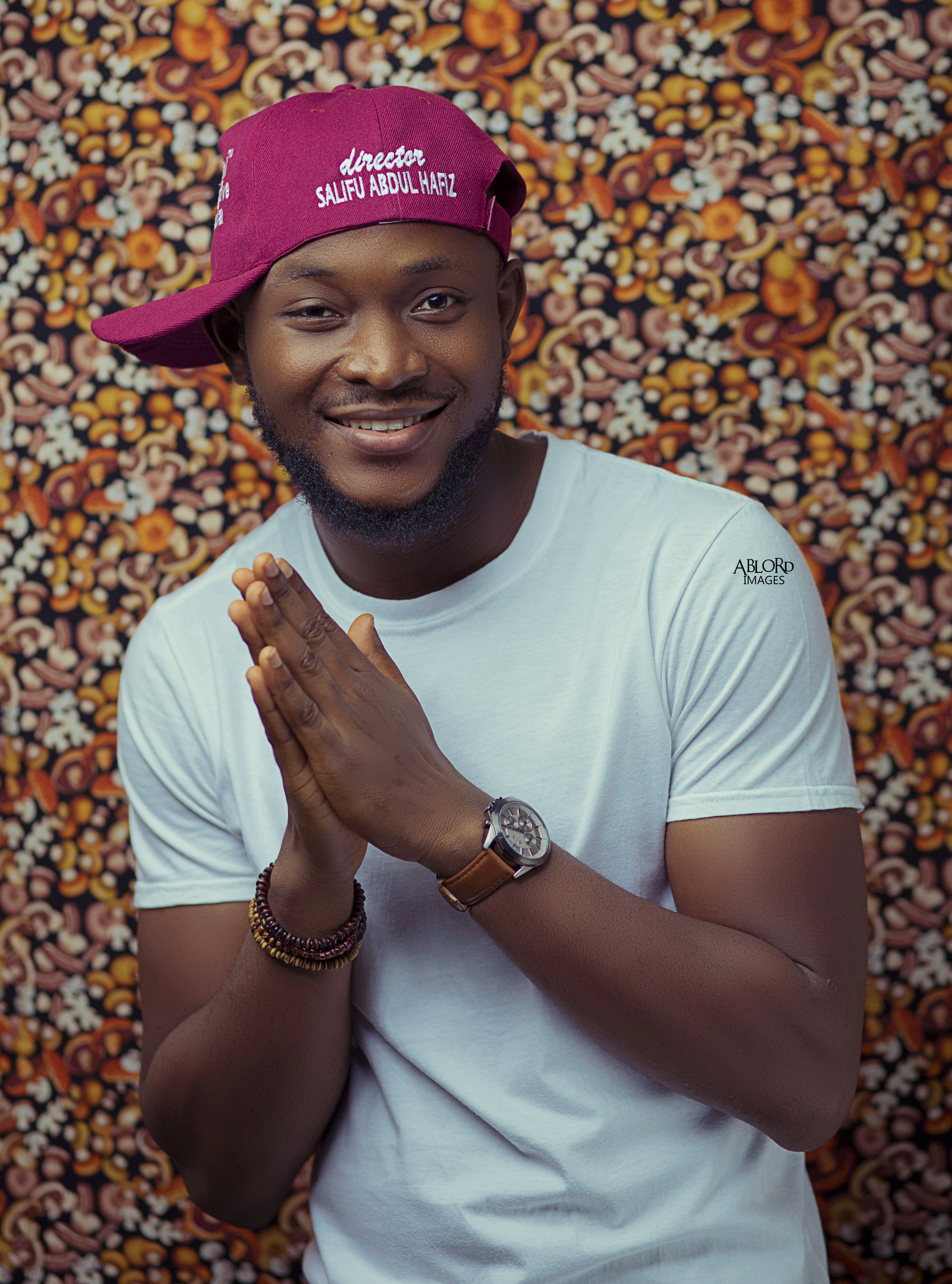
- Salifu Abdul Hafiz in 2018

Background information
- Born: Salifu Abdul Hafiz; 3 March 1990 (age 36); Accra, Ghana
- Origin: Abetifi - Kwahu
- Occupations: Cinematographer, music video director
- Years active: 2011-present
- Website: dcmedialive.com

Salifu Abdul Hafiz (born March, 1990) is a Ghanaian Film/Commercial and Music Video Director who has shot and directed several music videos for artiste like Dobble, Mr. Eazi, Obrafour, Sarkodie, Guru, Maccasio, Medikal, Teephlow, YPEE and many other artiste across the globe.

He is the founder and creative director of a renowned Ghanaian video production company, Digital Creative Media formerly known as DC FILMS PRODUCTION. They’ve produced content for international brands like USAID, IDH, DECATHLON, BETWAY, TULLOW OIL, CAL BANK and many others.

== Life and career ==
Salifu Abdul Hafiz grew up in Abetifi-Kwahu where he started basic school through to senior high at Abetifi Presbyterian Senior High School.

After high school in 2009, he worked in an internet cafe as a cafe attendant and was later promoted to be the manager of the branch. Whiles working in the cafe, he learned sound engineering and video editing which motivated him to take a career in the field of multimedia. He produced demos for himself and up-and-coming artistes, including making covers of songs.

He relocated to Accra the capital city of Ghana to pursue his dreams in 2010.

He enrolled in Takoradi Technical University then Takoradi Polytechnic to pursue Commercial Art in 2012. Whiles in school, Hafiz did photo shoots, shot events, promotional adverts and music videos which aired on national TV.

He interned with NKACC a company owned by multiple awarding winning Ghanaian director, Nana Kofi Asihene who trained and nurtured him to the beginning of his career as a video director. He shot music videos for up-and-coming artistes.

He was invited to have an album listening with E.L, a multiple award-winning Ghanaian musician/songwriter and producer. E.L gave Hafiz the opportunity to shoot a music video for a song he featured Ghana's rap legend Obrafour after which they collaborated on many other projects including ‘Kaa Bu Ame'.

Salifu Abdul Hafiz has shot documentaries and adverts for brands like USAID, IDH, Betway, YES Ghana, Decathlon, Tullow Oil, CalBank amongst many others.

He has directed music videos for the likes of Mr. Eazi, E.L, Sarkodie, Obrafour, Guru, Dobble, Maccasio, GuiltyBeatz, King Promise, Mugeez (R2Bees), Joey B, YPEE, Nana Yaa, Cent Remmy, IWAN, TheWord, D-Flex, Teephlow, YPee and many others.

In 2017, Salifu Abdul Hafiz filmed Mr. Eazi’s Dettyworld Tour.

== Awards and nominations ==
=== 4syte Music Video Awards ===
Year	Nominee / work	Award	Result
2019	Poverty	Best Dancehall Video	Nominated

=== 3RD TV Music Video Awards ===
Year	Nominee / work	Award	Result
2019	Himself	Best Video Director	Won
2019	Poverty	Best Male Reggae / Dancehall Video	Won
2019	Company	Best Production Company	Nominated

=== MAYA Awards ===
Year	Nominee / work	Award	Result
2019	Himself	Best Music Video Director	Nominated

=== Greater Accra Music Awards ===
Year	Nominee / work	Award	Result
2019	Himself	Best Music Video Director of the year	Nominated

=== Eastern Music Awards ===
Year	Nominee / work	Award	Result
2018	Himself	Best Music Video Director of the year	Won

=== Ghana Music Awards SA ===
Year	Nominee / work	Award	Result
2018	Meye Guy Remix	Best Music Video	Nominated
2018	Moesha	Best Collaboration	Nominated

=== 3RD TV Music Video Awards ===
Year	Nominee / work	Award	Result
2018	Himself	Best Video Director	Nominated
2018	Company	Best Production Company	Won

=== Northern Entertainment Awards ===
Year	Nominee / work	Award	Result
2018	Himself	Best Music Video	Won
2018	Himself	Best Music Director	Won

=== UN Plural Plus Youth Video Festival ===
Year	Nominee / work	Award	Result
2018	Himself	Signis Award	Won

=== Ghana Music Awards UK ===
Year	Nominee / work	Award	Result
2017	BOOZE N BOOBS	Best Music Video	Nominated

=== Ghana Tertiary Awards ===
Year	Nominee / work	Award	Result
2014	Himself	Most Influential Student in Film Making	Won
