= Émile Ackermann =

French Modern Orthodox rabbi

Emile Ackermann

Personal life
- Born: Strasbourg, France
- Spouse: Myriam Ackermann-Sommer
- Education: Yeshivat Hakotel; Yeshivat Chovevei Torah
- Known for: Co-founding Ayeka
- Occupation: Rabbi, author

Religious life
- Religion: Judaism
- Denomination: Modern Orthodox Judaism

Emile Ackermann is a French Modern Orthodox rabbi and author. He is the co-founder of Ayeka, a Modern Orthodox Jewish community in Paris, which he established with his wife, Myriam Ackermann-Sommer.

== Early life and education ==
Ackermann was born in Strasbourg, France, and grew up in an Orthodox Jewish family. He studied at Yeshivat Hakotel in Jerusalem before pursuing university studies in France. He subsequently attended Yeshivat Chovevei Torah in New York, where he received rabbinical ordination in 2023.

== Rabbinical career ==
Ackermann and his wife founded Ayeka in Paris, a congregation associated with Modern Orthodox Judaism. Their work emphasizes Jewish education, the study of religious texts and women's participation in Jewish learning.

Ackermann has also taken part in public discussions about secularism in France, antisemitism and religious identity.

In 2023, he published N'oublions pas qui nous sommes, a book discussing Modern Orthodox Judaism and the place of religion in contemporary French society.

== Personal life ==
Ackermann is married to rabbi Myriam Ackermann-Sommer, with whom he leads the Ayeka community in Paris.
