= Paa Kwasi =

Ghanaian musical artist

- Also known as: Paa Kwasi
- Born: Nana Kwasi Aryeh; Ghana
- Origin: Axim, Western Region
- Genres: highlife; hiplife; afrobeats
- Occupations: singer; songwriter; performer
- Years active: 2010–present
- Label: BigAyehMedia
- Website: paakwasi.com

Paa Kwasi (born Nana Kwasi Aryeh), is a Ghanaian Highlife singer, songwriter, and performer from the Western Region of Ghana. He was a former lead member of the music group Dobble.

== Musical career ==
Paa Kwasi became well known as part of the music group Dobble. The group won "Most Popular Song of the Year" at the 2017 VGMAs with their song "Christy".

After Dobble broke up, he began a solo music career. Kwasi said that he has achieved more success than when he was with Dobble. In 2017, he performed live for over 3,000 people at Baba Yara Stadium, helping him to grow his solo career.

His song "Abe" (also written as "Abɛ" in Twi) became popular and won "Highlife Song of the Year" at the RTC Western Music Awards.

In 2018, he signed a five-year music contract with a Ghanaian football player.

Later, after releasing the song "Y3 Brodada," he was praised by well-known highlife musician Obouba J.A. Adofo.

== Controversies ==
In 2018, a public disagreement between Paa Kwasi and Kumi Guitar attracted criticism, with many viewing it as unnecessary and unhelpful to the music industry.

== Appearances ==
He has also been featured by Obrafour on the song "Odo Electric", Mzbel on "Mmo", Dada Hafco on "Bedi Anko", and Quarme Zaggy on a track titled "Highlife".

== Discography ==
=== Albums/EPs ===
- Highlife (2020)
- FaceOne (2021)
- Kwasi (Ep) (2021)
- Songs of Paa Kwasi (2021)
- Expression (2022)
- Gud Mood the Deluxe (2024)
- Afrosounds EP (2024)

=== Singles ===
- "Nipa Dasani" (2016)
- "Wack Mc" (2016)
- "Abɛ" ("Abe") (2017)
- "Enhye Wo" (2020)

== Videography ==
Year	Title	Director	Ref
2016	Nipa Dasani	DCFilms	
2016	Awuor	Steve Gyamfi	
2018	Hun	Xbills Ebenezer	
2018	I Don't Care	Prince Dovlo	

== Awards and nominations ==
Year	Oganaziation	Award	Work	Result	Ref
2018	RTC Western Music Awards	Highlife Song of the Year	"Abe" ("Abɛ")	Won	
2018	RTC Western Music Awards	Highlfe Artist of the Year	Himself	Nominated	
