= Baba Spirit =

Ghanaian comedian (died 2022)

- Born: 1981; Northern Region
- Citizenship: Ghana
- Occupations: Comedian, Actor, Media personality

Francis Yaw Ofori (popularly known as Baba Spirit) (1981 – 8 September 2022) was a Ghanaian comedian, comic actor, MC and media personality. In 2017, he made headlines in the media when he proposed to fight Ayittey Powers in a boxing match.

== Career ==
He began his career as an actor and shot to fame in 2017. He was the former host of 'Broken News' on Adom TV. In 2018, he fought Ayittey Powers in a boxing fight at the Bukom Boxing Arena in Accra which was publicized. He also featured in a music video by Dada Hafco.

== Death ==
He died on Thursday 8 September 2022 after he was diagnosed with low blood count. He died from an illness in the Ashanti Region after he was admitted in Kotoku hospital aged 41.
