= Mizter Okyere =

Ghanaian saxophonist and producer

Daniel Okyere Donkor popularly known with his stage name Mizter Okyere is a Ghanaian saxophonist, video editor and producer. In 2019, he was awarded the Best Instrumentalist of the Year at the Vodafone Ghana Music Awards, got honored at 2019 3G Awards New York, won best instrumentalist at 2019 Ghana Music Awards Europe

== Early life and career ==
Mizter Okyere was born in Kumasi in the Ashanti Region of Ghana and the first of three children. He completed St. Mary's Anglican JHS and upon completion, he furthered his education at NIIT and Soul Food ICT College where he studied Networking and Computer Programming.

== Career ==
Mizter Okyere who was formally called Bigdee started his music career from church as an instrumentalist and through that established his own recording studio Bigdee Beat Studio currently called Mizter Okyere Music Studio.

== Notable performances ==
Mizter Okyere has performed on stages like African Development Bank Annual Meeting 2022 in Ghana Accra, Rhythms on the Runway, Takoradi Music Awards, African Legends Night, Rapperholic, Vodafone Ghana Music Awards, Ghana Meets Naija, Miss Universe Ghana, Easter Comedy Show, MMC Live, Ghana Beverage Awards, Glo Mega Music Show, Bhim Concert, Glitz Style Awards,> Emy Awards Africa, NPP Loyal Ladies Cook Out and has also performed alongside Samini, Sarkodie, Stonebwoy, Becca, Kofi Kinata .

== Award and nomination ==
Year	Award ceremony	Prize	Nominated work	Result	Ref
2018	Ghana Music Awards UK	Uncovered Artiste of the Year	Himself	Nominated	
2019	Ghana Music & Arts Awards Europe	Instrumentalist of the Year	Himself	Won	
2019	3G Awards	Instrumentalist of the Year	Himself	Won	
2019	Vodafone Ghana Music Awards	Instrumentalist of the Year	Himself	Won	
2020	Vodafone Ghana Music Awards	Instrumentalist of the Year	Himself	Nominated	
