= Ayeka =

Ayeka may refer to:

- Ayeka Masaki Jurai, a Tenchi Muyo! character
- Ayeka, a 2014 almum by Barima Sidney
