= Breaking the News =

Breaking the News may refer to:

- Breaking the News (1912 film), an Australian melodrama film
- Breaking the News (2023 film), an American documentary film
- Breaking the News (2015–), a news comedy panel show hosted by Des Clarke on radio via BBC Radio Scotland and on television via BBC Scotland
- Breaking the News (painting), an 1887 painting by John Longstaff

== See also ==
- Breaking news (disambiguation)
