= Myriam Ackermann-Sommer =

First woman to be ordained as an Orthodox rabbi in France (born 1996)

Rabbi Myriam Ackermann-Sommer
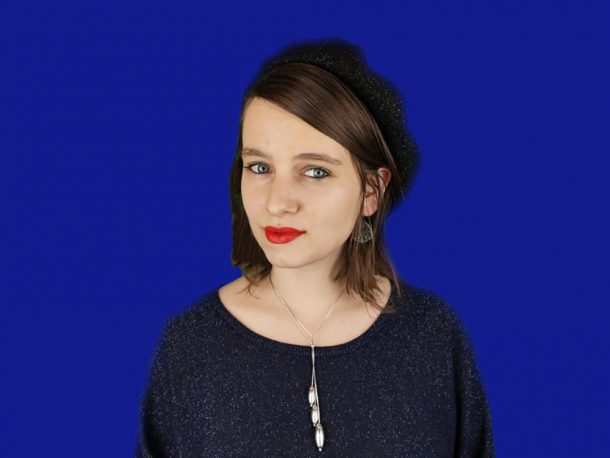
- Ackermann-Sommer in 2020

Personal life
- Born: 1996 (age 29–30) Perpignan, France
- Spouse: Émile Ackermann
- Children: 2
- Education: École normale supérieure
- Relatives: Alexis Blum (uncle)

Religious life
- Religion: Judaism
- Denomination: Modern Orthodox Judaism

Jewish leader
- Yeshiva: Yeshivat Maharat

Myriam Ackermann-Sommer (born 1996) is a French teacher and rabbi. She became the sixth woman to be ordained rabbi in France and the first from Modern Orthodox Judaism in 2023.

== Early life and education ==
Ackermann-Sommer was born in 1996 in Perpignan, France, the daughter of a non-observant Proetstant father and a non-observant Jewish mother. Her uncle is Rabbi Alexis Blum, from whom she adopted the enthusiasm for studying sacred texts.

In 2015 Ackermann-Sommer went to Paris to study at the École normale supérieure. She later emigrated to the United States to study at the Yeshivat Maharat religious school in New York, as she was unable to attend Orthodox schools in France that offered classes for women. In New York, Ackermann-Sommer set up a Talmud study group. She is qualified to teach English and obtained a master's degree in American Jewish literary studies.

== Rabbinical career ==
Since 2022, she has been co-leading the Ayeka modern Orthodox congregation in Paris with her husband, Emile Aickermann.

She was ordained as a rabbi after completing her rabbinical studies at Yeshivat Maharat alongside her husband, Emile Aickermann, in June 2023 in New York. Aickermann-Sommer became the sixth female rabbi in France, but the first to come from a more traditional sector of Judaism, and both became the first married Orthodox rabbis.

Both opened a YouTube channel and Myriam presents the podcast Daf Yummy where she comments on the day's Talmud passage for 15 minutes.

== Views ==
Despite criticism from within the community itself, Ackermann-Sommer has consistently advocated for the traditionalist Orthodox community to be open to contemporary issues such as feminism – indeed, she identifies as a feminist and calls for greater participation of women in Jewish life– and environmentalism. Referring to the LGBTI community, she noted in a 2020 interview that it is not merely a question of ‘tolerance’ but of integrating the community. She also talks about “democratising access to the Torah”.

== Personal life ==
She married lawyer Émile Ackermann in 2022, with whom she have a daughter.
