= Breaking News (album) =

Studio album by Samini
- Released: December 3, 2015
- Recorded: 2014–2015
- Genre: Dancehall; reggae; hiplife
- Label: High Grade Family
- Producer: Brainy Beatz (exec.); JMJ; Magnom; Gafacci; JR; Masta Garzy; Musicman TY

Singles from Breaking News
- 1. "New Style'" Released: October 8, 2015; 2. "Ye Ko Paapi ft KK Fosu" Released: September 23, 2015; 3. "Violate ft Popcaan" Released: September 21, 2014

Breaking News is a smooth mix of musical genres, melodious interface of the African music form Highlife, with the Jamaican music forms dancehall and reggae as well as the American styling of hip hop. Samini calls this the hybrid world music presentation. Breaking News, also known as the #ThePeoplesAlbum, features top notch artiste like Busy Signal, Popcaan, both from Jamaica and Ice Prince, Tiwa Savage, Stonebwoy, Phyno, Seyi Shay and many more. Credits to the lead guitarist Owura K.

This album was predominantly produced by Brainy Beatz, with additional work from JMJ, Gafacci, Masta Garzy, Musicman TY, Magnom and JR. Three Official Single from the album were officially released, "New Style'", "Violate" ft Popcaan and "Ye Ko Paapi" respectively.

== Track listing ==
No.	Title	Writer(s)	Producer(s)	Length
1.	"Breaking News"	Emmanuel Andrews Samini	Brainy Beatz	3:55
2.	"Ye Ko Paapi" (featuring KK Fosu)	Emmanuel Andrews Samini; KK Fosu		3:10
3.	"Alhaji One"	Emmanuel Andrews Samini	JMJ	3:37
4.	"Salute"	Emmanuel Andrews Samini	JMJ	3:46
5.	"Wedding Day" (featuring Ice Prince)	Emmanuel Andrews Samini; Panshak Zamani	Masta Garzy	3:54
6.	"Say No More" (featuring Phyno)	Emmanuel Andrews Samini	Brainy Beatz	3:30
7.	"Party Away" (featuring Stonebwoy)	Emmanuel Andrews Samini; L.E.Satekla	Brainy Beatz	3:23
8.	"No More Guns" (featuring Busy Signal)	Emmanuel Andrews Samini	Brainy Beatz	3:12
9.	"Nighy & PJ"	Emmanuel Andrews Samini	Brainy Beatz	3:57
10.	"Omg" (featuring Tiwa Savage)	Emmanuel Andrews Samini; Tiwatope Savage	Brainy Beatz	3:26
11.	"Violate" (featuring Popcaan)	Emmanuel Andrews Samini	Magnom	3:05
12.	"Bubble It"	Emmanuel Andrews Samini	Gafacci	3:47
13.	"Zingolo" (featuring Joey B & Pappy Kojo)	Emmanuel Andrews Samini	JR	3:52
14.	"Higher"	Emmanuel Andrews Samini	Brainy Beatz	3:05
15.	"That's Ma Girl"	Emmanuel Andrews Samini	Musicman TY	3:30
16.	"Allo Saa" (featuring VVIP)	Emmanuel Andrews Samini; VVIP	Brainy Beatz	3:49
17.	"Ride or Die"	Emmanuel Andrews Samini	Brainy Beatz	3:19
18.	"Tunnuppppp" (featuring Seyi Shay)	Emmanuel Andrews Samini	Brainy Beatz	3:44
