= Vicky Zugah =

Ghanaian actress

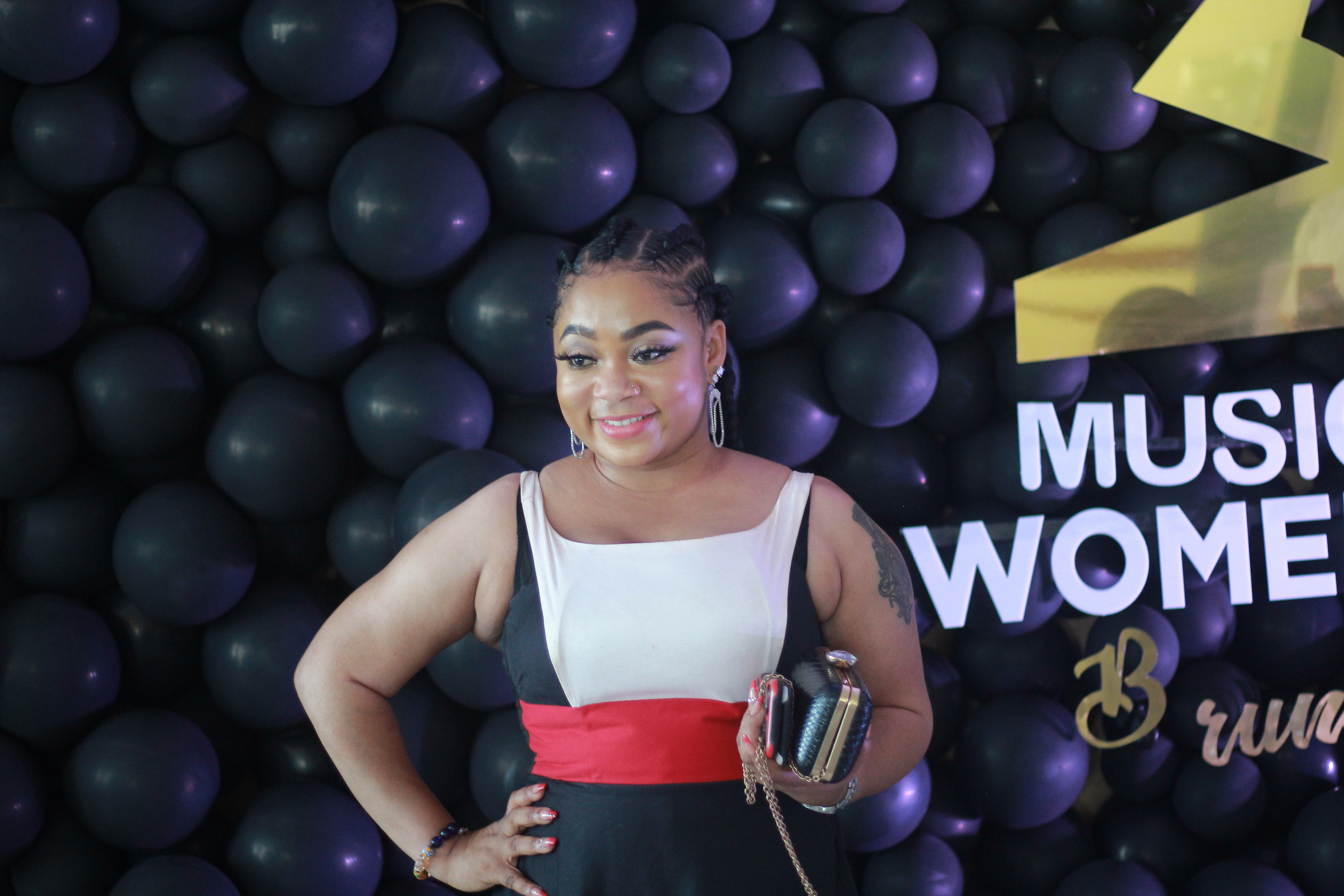
- 3Music Women’s Brunch
- Born: Victoria Zugah; 11 October 1983 (age 42); Ave-Dakpa
- Occupation: Actress

Victoria Zugah (born 11 October 1983) better known as Vicky Zugah is a Ghanaian female actress and celebrity who hails from the Volta Region of Ghana.

== Early life ==
She is the third daughter of Mr. Komla Zugah and Miss Beatrice Patu from the Volta Region.

== Career ==
Her acting career started when her friends told her she has the ability to act and that she has all features that qualifies her to become an actress, so she had an opportunity to feature in her first movie which she starred alongside Jackie Appiah and the late Suzzy Williams. Her first movie Trokosi became her breakthrough movie and she believe that she was lucky. She loves to learn from her peers and experienced actors in the industry in other to improve upon her acting skills.

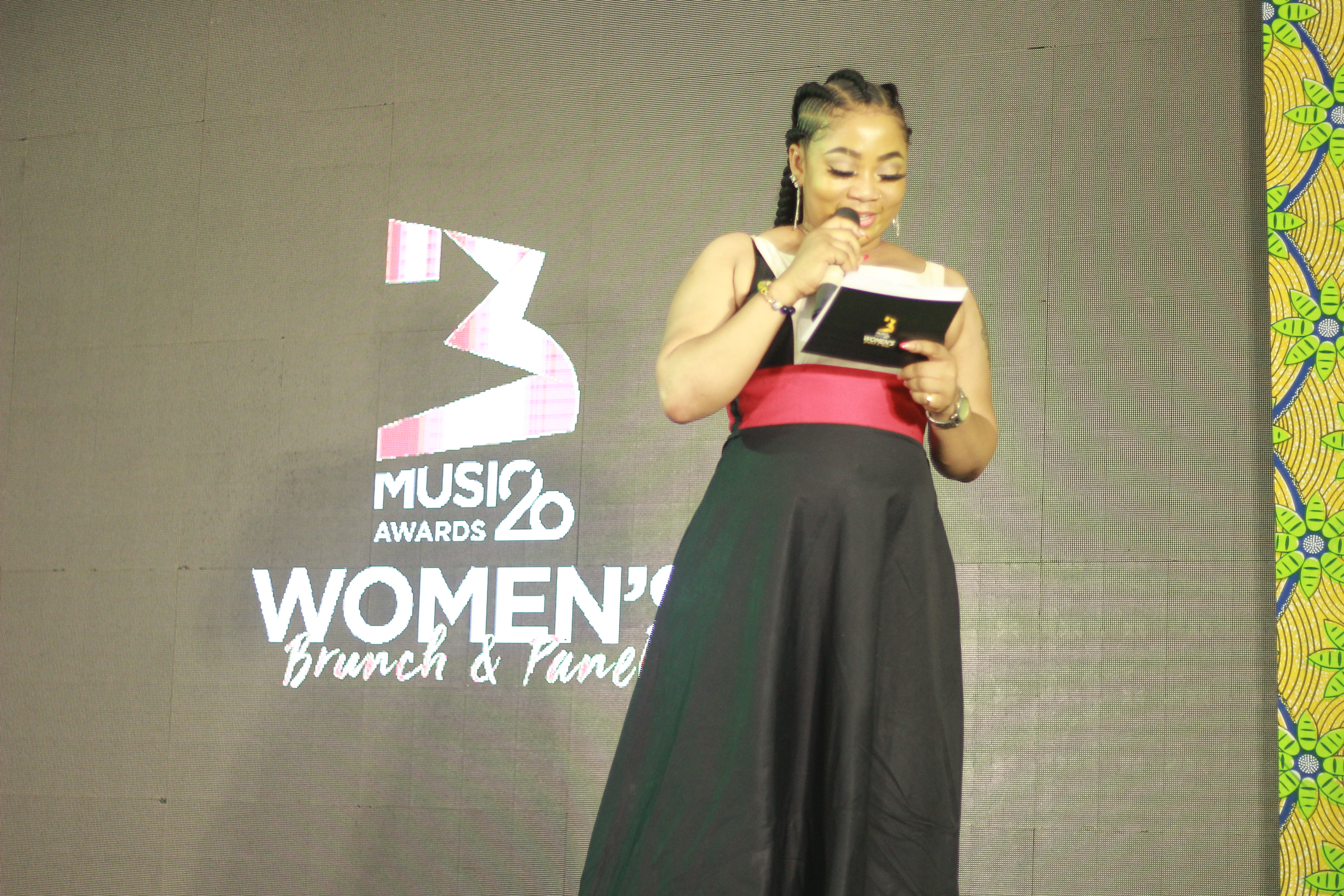
Vicky Zugah, 3Music Women's Brunch, 2020

== Filmography ==
List of movies and television programs she has appeared in over the years.

- The Atuu Show
- The Recruitment (2023)
- Beyond Critical (2022)
- Inner woman (2019)
- Trokosi
- Total Exchange
- Cross My Heart (2007)
- My Darling Princess (2008) as Lola
- June 4
- Araba Lawson
- Big Girl Club
- Girls Connection (2008) as Mabel
- True Colour
- Pretty Queen
- Tears of Womanhood
- The Return of Beyonce (2006) as Angel
- The Bible
- The King with No Culture (2018) as Ashantua
- Oyaw No
- Agatha
- Act of Shame
- Mummy's daughter
