= Ofori Panin Senior High School =

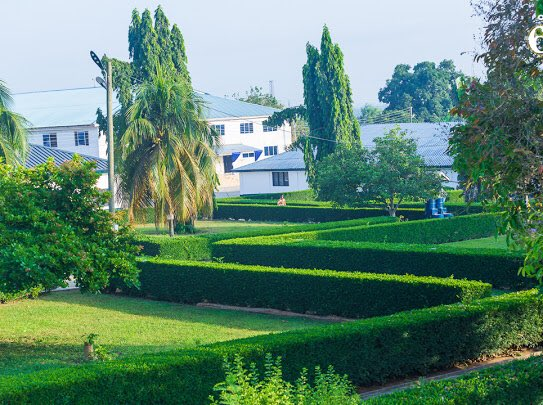

Location
- P. O. Box 11; Tafo -Kukurantumi. Tafo; Eastern Region; Tafo 00233; Ghana
- Coordinates: 05°37′38″N 00°12′49″W

Information
- School type: High School Co-educational Boarding / Residential
- Motto: Dwen na Som (Think and Serve)
- Religious affiliation: Non-denominational Christian
- Established: 22 September 1961
- Founder: Dr Kwame Nkrumah
- Educational authority: Ministry of Education
- Chairperson: Opanin Charles Arthur, Chairperson of Board of Governors
- Head teacher: Mr Ernest Antwi Gyimah
- Chaplain: Rev. Eric Aforo .
- Grades: Forms 1–3 (10th – 12th grades)
- Gender: Co-ed (Boys/Girls)
- Age range: 14 to 19 years
- Education system: Senior High School
- Classes offered: Visual Arts, Home Economics, Science, General Arts, Business
- Campus: Ofori Panin School
- Campus type: Residential garden-style Setting
- Houses: 8
- Colours: Blue and White
- Song: OPASS, Our Alma Mater
- Nickname: OPASS
- Publication: Mpaninfoɔ
- Alumni: OPASS Alumni Association
- Website: www.oforipaninshs.com

Ofori Panin Senior High School (OPASS) is a co-educational second cycle institution at Kukurantumi in the Eastern Region of Ghana. Ofori Panin School (formerly Tafo-Kukurantumi Senior High school, now nicknamed OPASS), is a co-educational boarding school located at Tafo in Akyem, Eastern Region, Ghana. The school was founded in 1961 by Kwame Nkrumah. The foundation stone of the building was laid on 19 May 1962 by Hon. Kofi Asante Ofori Attah, M.P. for Akim Abuakwa and Minister of Justice at that time. An alumnus/alumna of Ofori Panin is known as an "Opassian".

The motto of the school is "Dwen Na Som" meaning "Think and Serve", a reference to the founders' expressed philosophy that starting in the context of school life, male and female, everyone should serve with a thoughtful mind and be ready and willing to serve yourself, your school, family, nation and the world at large. The school crest was designed using the leopard, a torch, a cutlass and a tree. The leopard signifies strength and intelligence, a torch, which shows light and brightness on the path to victory, a cutlass that represents the farming community of Akim Abuakwa, a tree signifying the rain forest of Akyem Abuakwa which provides fertile land for the production of timber and cocoa, the backbone of Ghana's economy.

== Principals and heads ==
Name	Tenure of office
Mr. Kwaku Adwedaa, B.Sc.	1961–1963
Mr. S. T. Ampofo, B. A. (Hons)	1963–1976
Mr. E. Twum-Danso, B.A. Legon (Acting)	1976–1977
Mr. G. A. Gyimah, B.A. Legon	1977–1991
Mr. K. Amo-Dako, B.A. Ed.	1991–2003
Mr. K. Kyei-Brobbey, B Sc. (Hons) Dip (Agric), Dip. Ed.	2003–2012
Rev. Kent Badu	2012–2014
Dr. Edmund K. Fianu Dip. ED., BA(Hons), M.A DT.	2014–2017
Mrs Charlotte Asante	Aug 2017 – Oct 2017
Mr. John K. Beantey (Jnr)	2017–2020
Mr. Ernest Antwi Gyimah	2020-

== Notable alumni ==
- Kwaku Danso-Boafo – Cabinet Secretary & Former Ghana's High Commissioner to the United Kingdom and Ireland and Ambassador to Cuba with concurrent accreditation to Jamaica, Trinidad and Tobago, Nicaragua and Panama
- Dorothy Yeboah-Manu – microbiologist and Director of Noguchi Memorial Institute for Medical Research at the University of Ghana
- Justice Julius Ansah – Former Supreme Court judge
- Patrick Darko Missah – director general of the Ghana Prisons Service
- Mohammed Boakye Agyemang – Former MP for Ejisu-Juabeng Constituency
- Kwakye Darfour – Ghanaian politician and a member of the New Patriotic Party in Ghana
- Xbills Ebenezer – music video director, and filmmaker
- Nii Amasah Namoale – Ghanaian politician
- Nana Mitch – Ghanaian Snapchat lens creator, creative director, editor and content creator
- Henry Harding – Ghanaian film actor
- Dj Black (Ghanaian DJ) – Ghanaian disc jockey and media personality
- Atsrim Sitsofe Philip – Sports Broadcaster
- Patrick Osei-Agyeman (alias Countryman Songo) – Sports Broadcaster
- Kwami Fortune - Ghanaian Blogger
