= Joyce Blessing =

Ghanaian gospel musician

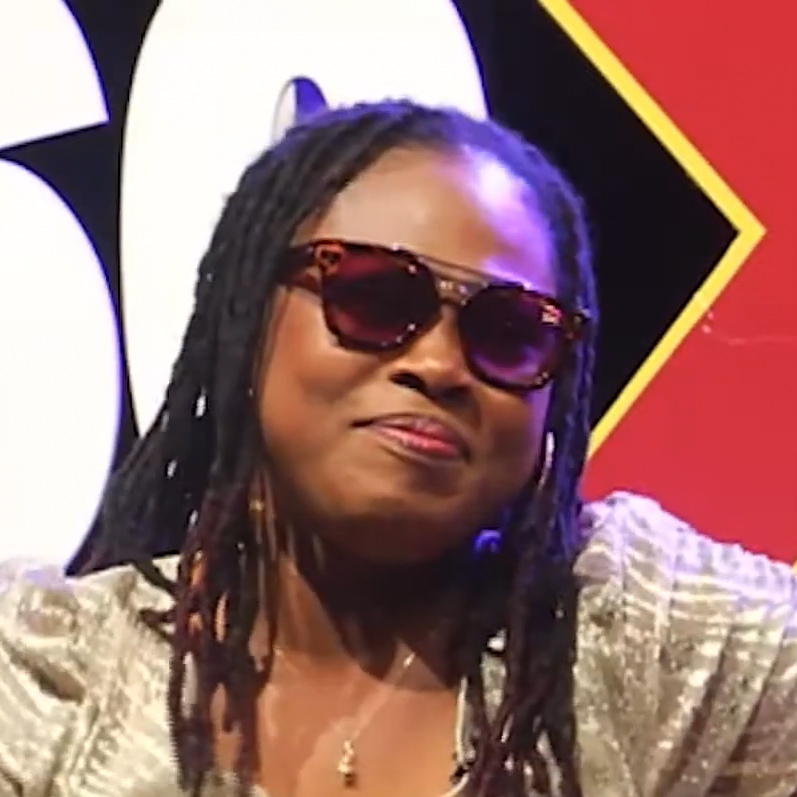
- Joyce in 2021

Background information
- Born: Joyce Akosua Twene
- Origin: Ghana
- Genre: Gospel
- Occupation: Singer
- Years active: 2007–present

Joyce Akosua Twene also known as Joyce Blessing is a Ghanaian and African gospel musician.

== Early life and education ==
Joyce Akosua Twene known popularly as Joyce Blessing was born to Mr Christopher Kwabena Twene and Mrs Gladys Yaa Kyewaa on 15 May at Accra, Ghana. Joyce is the fourth child of her parents. She grew up with other siblings who were all raised by their mother in Kumasi, the Ashanti Region of Ghana where she had her primary school and Junior High School education .

== Music career ==
Joyce began singing in the church at the age of 14 and would often attend musical concerts held at her vicinity.

She improved her live performance artistry during her time as the youngest member of the “See Them Band” group in Kumasi. She played for five years while being a backing vocalist for the likes of Evangelist Diana Asamoah, Jewel Ackah, Mary Ghansah, Ernest Opoku Jnr, Aseibu Amanfi and other musicians in Ghana.

Joyce started ministry in 2007 with showbiz name Joyce Tuffuor and recorded her first album, dubbed "Obi Ntu Nyame Fo", which translates to English as "Nobody Advises God".

Joyce shot to fame in the year 2013 with a new showbiz name Joyce Blessing. She released her song "Monko Moakyi", a single from her Heavy Price album which became one of her most popular songs. The album included other hits, such as Kantamanto Nyame, Blessed Be The Lord, and Nyame Aguamma. This was under the management of Media Excel Productions in collaboration with DaveJoy Productions. Blessing won six awards at the Ghana Gospel Industry Awards, organized by Adom FM.

She also made her first entry into the ultimate Ghana Music Awards in 2014 where she grabbed nominations for Gospel Song of the Year, Best Female Vocal Performance, Gospel Artiste of the Year, Album of the Year and Best Collaboration of the Year categories, with her “Heavy Price” album which she won the Best Gospel Album of the year with Heavy Price.

In April 2017 SHE released her album 'AGYEBUM' which earned her several nominations in the 2017 National Gospel Awards where she won the Best Praise Song of the Year Award and again won an award at the 2017 4syte Music Video Awards for the Best Gospel Music Video of the Year with her visuals shot for the “Lord’s Prayer single”.

In 2018, Blessing took the lead among other gospel musicians in Ghana with copping nominations in all awards organized in Ghana. She recently won the Gospel artiste of the year at Ghana Entertainment Awards USA, Ghana Music Awards South Africa Gospel Artiste of the Year and grabbed three awards at the recent BAMA Awards in Ghana, making a sum of 22 awards copped in just five years in ministry, an achievement no Ghanaian gospel musician has been able to attain so far.

She again grabbed nominations for Gospel Song of the year and Gospel Artiste of the Year at the Vodafone Ghana Music Awards, three Music Awards and more.

In 2019, Blessing has nominations for Hippo Music Awards based in Uganda and six nominations at MAWA 2019 in Nigeria and won an award with her latest Repent single at Maranatha Global Worship Music Awards In Kenya.

She currently has 24 awards and six albums to her credit.

As part of her gospel ministry, she has set up a charity foundation which donates to the deaf and blind, accident victims, and mentally challenged people in Ghanaian society.

== Awards and nominations ==
Year	Event	Prize	Recipient / Nominated work	Result	Ref
2018	Ghana Music Awards UK	Gospel Song of the Year	Boot 4 Boot	Nominated	
2018	Ghana Music Awards UK	Gospel Artiste of the Year	Herself	Nominated	
2018	3Music Awards	Gospel Act of the Year	Herself	Nominated	
2018	3Music Awards	Female Act of the Year	Herself	Nominated	
2014	Vodafone Ghana Music Awards	Gospel Song of the Year	Nyame Egwamaa	Nominated	
2014	Vodafone Ghana Music Awards	Best Female Vocal Performance	Herself	Nominated	
2014	Vodafone Ghana Music Awards	Gospel Artiste of the Year	Herself	Nominated	
2014	Vodafone Ghana Music Awards	Album of the Year	Heavy Price	Won	
2014	Vodafone Ghana Music Awards	Best Collaboration of the Year	Herself ft. Jewel Ackah	Nominated	
2013	Ghana Gospel Industry Awards	Album of the Year	Heavy Price	Nominated	
2013	Ghana Gospel Industry Awards	Song of the Year	Monko Mo Akyi	Nominated	
2013	Ghana Gospel Industry Awards	Artiste of the Year	Herself	Nominated	
2013	Ghana Gospel Industry Awards	Popular Video of the Year	Monko Mo Akyi	Nominated	
2013	Ghana Gospel Industry Awards	Collaboration of the Year	Herself ft. Jewel Ackah	Nominated	
2013	Ghana Gospel Industry Awards	Female Vocalist of the Year	Herself	Nominated	
2024	Telecel Music Awards	Gospel Song Of The Year	Victory	Nominated	

== Discography ==
=== Albums ===
Year	Title	Ref
2007	Obi Ntu Nyame	
2012	Promise and Fail	
2014	Heavy Price	
2017	Agyebum	
2023	Victory	

=== Major Singles ===
- Monko Mo Akyi
- Mensei Da
- Heavy Price
- I Swerve You
