= Quamina MP =

African music artist

- Born: Emmanuel Kwamina Amonoo; September 11, 1993 (age 32); Accra, Ghana
- Genres: Hip hop, Afrobeat, Hiplife
- Occupations: Artiste, Record producer
- Years active: 2017 – present

Emmanuel Kwamina Amonoo (born September 11, 1993) also known by the stage name Quamina MP is a Ghanaian musician and record producer.

== Early life ==
Quamina MP was born on the 11th of September in Takoradi. He lived and was brought up in Mankessim where he had his basic education. He attended St Marys Senior High School for his secondary education. He then proceeded to Ghana Communication Technology University for his tertiary education in which he had to drop out due to his parents' low financial status.

== Music career ==
Quamina learnt how to create beats around 2014 to support his choice to pursue music fulltime after dropping out of university. In 2017, he met Ground Up Chale, a talent recruiting and music managing platform which gave him his big break in the music industry in Ghana with the song Wiase Y3d3.

He lost his dad in November 2020 to a road accident after they were travelling together.

== Notable performances ==
Quamina MP has performed at Rapperhorlic Concert, Afrochella, Detty Rave, Bhim Concert, Tidal Rave, Ghana Rocks, Vodafone Ghana Music Awards, Ghana hall Party(London) Ghana music awards (London) and Ghana Independence Party (Manchester).

== Discography ==
=== Singles ===
- Quamina MP - Wiase Y3d3
- Quamina MP - Ohia Y3 Forkin
- Quamina MP - Wo Y3 Guy
- Quamina MP - Change Your Style
- Quamina MP - Amanfuor Girls
- Quamina MP - Party
- Quamina MP - Feel Okay
- Quamina MP - Back To Sender Feat Kofi Kinaata
- Quamina MP- Before you go X Camidoh ft Mix Master Garzy(2024)

=== EP ===
- African Print EP
- Bongo EP

== Awards and nominations ==
Year	Organization	Recipient/Nominated work	Award	Result	Ref
2019	2019 Vodafone Ghana Music Awards	Wiase Y3 D3 Remix featuring Kwesi Arthur & Yung C	Hiplife Song Of The Year	Nominated	
2019	2019 Vodafone Ghana Music Awards	Wiase Y3 D3	New Artiste Of The Year	Nominated	
2020	2020 Vodafone Ghana Music Awards	Amanfour Girls	Hiplife/Hip Hop Artiste Of The Year	Nominated	
2020	2020 Vodafone Ghana Music Awards	Amanfour Girls	Most Popular Song Of The Year	Nominated	
2020	2020 Vodafone Ghana Music Awards	Amanfour Girls	Hiplife Song Of The Year	Nominated	
2020	2020 Vodafone Ghana Music Awards	Amanfour Girls Remix feat Medikal	Best Collaboration Of The Year	Nominated	
2020	3 Music Awards	Amanfour Girls	Hiplife Song Of The Year	Won	
2020	3 Music Awards	Amanfour Girls feat Medikal	Best Collaborations	Nominated	
2022	2022 Vodafone Ghana Music Awards	Enjoyment Minister D-Black Feat Quamina MP, Stonebwoy	Collaboration Of The Year	Won	
