= Dobble (music duo) =

Ghanaian music duo

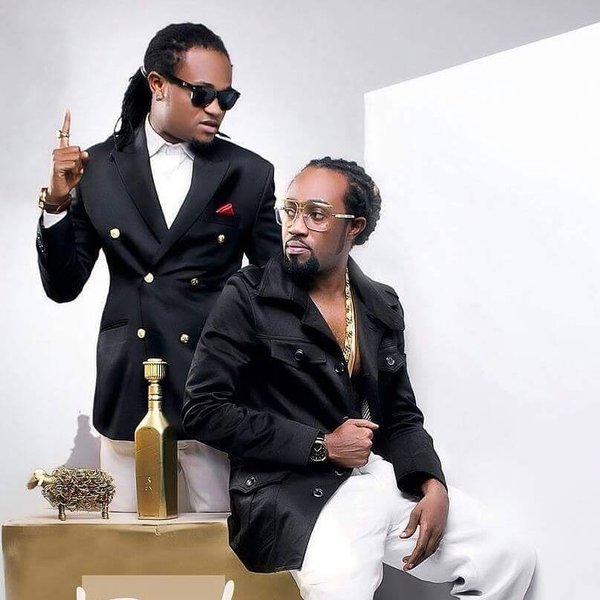
- Dobble in 2016

Background information
- Origin: Accra, Ghana
- Genres: highlife; hiplife; afrobeats; afro-pop; Azonto
- Years active: 2010–2016
- Labels: Phibi, Empire Records
- Past members: Paa Kwasi; Nana Yaw
- "Christy" VGMAs Most Popular Song of the Year (2017)

Dobble was a Ghanaian hiplife and highlife duo based in Accra, Ghana. The group is composed of Paa Kwasi (Nana Kwasi Aryeh), and Nana Yaw (Gideon Edu Gyamfi). They won most popular song of the year with their hit song titled "Christy" at the 2017 VGMAs now Telecel Ghana Music Awards (TGMAs).

== Career ==
Dobble released countless hits and performed on several big stages. Some of their hits songs include Walai Talai, Otan Hunu, Eee Mana, Gud Mood, Spark Ma Moto, 'Deepest Side' featured Shatta Wale, 'Wat Can Come Can Come' also featured Bisa Kdei, and among others.

Their release "Walai Talai", became an instant hit under Phibi Records and they became one of the biggest music duos in Ghana.

However, it became obvious that they no longer attended events as a unit after one member, Nana Yaw, boycotted all events and told friends privately that he was readying himself for a solo project, this led the group to break up but continue to win the Most Popular Song of the Year with their hit song 'Christy' at Vodafone Ghana Music Awards in 2017.

== Discography ==
=== Singles ===
- "Walai Talai" (2010)
- "Ee Mana" (2012)
- "Wop3 Eyi" (2012)
- "Ole Seke" (2013)
- "Gud Mood" (2014)
- "Tres Bien" (2015)
- "Christy" (2016)

== Awards and nominations ==
Year	Organization	Award	Work	Result
2013	Vodafone Ghana Music Awards (VGMA)	Vodafone Song of the Year	"Ole Seke" (with Dr. Slim)	Nominated
2013	Vodafone Ghana Music Awards (VGMA)	Best Collaboration of the Year	"Ole Seke" (with Dr. Slim)	Nominated
2013	Vodafone Ghana Music Awards (VGMA)	Song of the Year	"Ole Seke" (with Dr. Slim)	Nominated
2017	Vodafone Ghana Music Awards (VGMA)	Most Popular Song of the Year	"Christy"	Won

== Videography ==
Year	Title	Director	Ref
2010	"Walai Talai"	Take 2 Films	
2012	"Ee Mana"	Luu Vision	
2013	"Spark Ma Motor"	Xbills Ebenezer	
2013	"Wop3 Eyi"	–	
2013	"Apology"	–	
2013	"Guerro"	Steve Gyamfi	
2014	"Gud Mood"	Xpress Phlims	
2015	"Otan Hunu"	Xbills Ebenezer	
2015	"Ghetto Pressure"	Salifu Abdul Hafiz	
2016	"Christy"	Steve Gyamfi	
