= Dada Hafco =

Ghanaian highlife musician

- Also known as: Dada Hafco
- Born: Terry Asare Boamah; Ghana
- Origin: Ghana
- Genres: Highlife
- Occupation: Musician

Terry Asare Boamah, known by the stage name Dada Hafco, is a Ghanaian high-life musician. His song Yebewu Nti was nominated in the 2018 Vodafone Ghana Music Awards as the Highlife Song of the Year. He was also nominated for the Highlife Artiste of the Year in the VGMA for two years in a row.

== Early life and career ==
He hails from Eastern region. He performed on stage with artistes such as Nero X and Efe Keys. He was formally of a group called Mframa before going solo.

== Discography ==
- Yebewu Nti feat. Baba Spirit and Yaw Dabo
- Our Story feat Fameye
- 'Are you your girlfriend's boyfriend'
- Playboy feat Akwaboah
- Awerekyekyere and
- Hini Me
- Bedianko feat Paa Kwasi
- Friends
- Afutuo
- Fall Down
- Mayentena

== Awards ==
He won Highlife Song of the Year at the Eastern Music Awards in Koforidua.

== Nominations ==
Year	Organization	Category	Nominated work	Result	Ref
2021	VGMA	Best Highlife Song of the Year	Play boy ft Akwaboah Jnr	Nominated	
2021	VGMA	Best Highlife Artiste of the Year	Himself	Nominated	
