= Salifu Dagarti =

Ghanaian police officer (c.1931–1964)

Salifu Dagarti (c. July 1931 — 2 January 1964) was a British trained Ghanaian police officer and presidential bodyguard who shielded Kwame Nkrumah with his body on the fifth attempt to assassinate Nkrumah since he came to power in 1957.

== Incident ==
A police constable on guard outside the residence of Ghana's president, Kwame Nkrumah, fired five gunshots at him in an assassination attempt. Constable Seth Ametewee invaded The Flagstaff House in Accra and missed with his first shot. Nkrumah's bodyguard, Salifu Dagarti, shielded the President with his body and was mortally wounded.
