= Teephlow =

Ghanaian hiphop artist

- Also known as: Phlowducator, Mr bar for bar, Ay3 Ready Ah
- Born: Lukeman Ekow Baidoo; 20 June 1991 (age 35); Kotokuraba, Cape Coast, Ghana
- Genres: Hip hop; Hiplife
- Occupations: Rapper, songwriter, producer, singer, philanthropist
- Instrument: Vocals
- Years active: 2012–present
- Labels: TeePhlow Music/ Revolve Music, The Last Two Music Group
- Website: teephlowmusic.com

Lukeman Ekow Baidoo (born 20 June 1991), who performs under the stage name Teephlow, is a Ghanaian award-winning hip hop recording artist. He was first noted at the maiden edition of the 2012 "Next Big Thing in GH Hip Hop" Talent Hunt Show. He released his debut single, The Warning, in 2014 featuring Sarkodie.

== Early life ==
Teephlow last of six children was born in Kotokuraba, a township in Central Region capital Cape Coast to Mr Mohammed Baidoo an educationist and Mrs Khadija Baidoo, a businesswoman. He attended Ekumfi T.I Ahmadiyya Senior High School and earned a BSC Quantity Surveying and Construction Economics from the Kwame Nkrumah University of Science and Technology.

== Musical career ==
=== 2012–15: Early beginnings ===
Teephlow began his music career in his tertiary days, rapping on campus building a strong fanbase at the Kwame Nkrumah University of Science and Technology. He gained national recognition during the Maiden Edition of the "Next Big Thing in Gh Hip-Hop" where he came out as the first runner-up. He was signed by Ghanaian producer Hammer of the Last Two Music Group, after the talent hunt show. He had a first taste of exposure when Hammer featured him on Kwaw Kese's song "Swedru Agona"and released his first single "The Warning" under the Last Two Label in 2014. . Teephlow is currently with TeePhlow Music/Revolve records which is his own creation and is managed by his blood brothers Ibrahim Kwame Baidoo ( Artist Manager) who has been his road manager since 2013 and Hameed Baidoo ( Brand and Creative Development). He has Kwame Asante as his official DJ and Elorm Beenie as the project publicist.

=== 2016–17: Phlowducation EP ===
In 2017, Teephlow released his debut tape “The Phlowducation EP” with Production from SnowBeatz, Possigee, Carl Zeus, Two Bars, and Seshi as well as guest appearances from Reggie Rockstone, Edem, Epixode, FlowkingStone, Worlasi, BigBen and Novo. The EP which was launched at the Coconut Grove Regency Hotel in Accra.

Teephlow won his first award, "Record of the Year" from the 8th song “State of the Art” of the Phlowducation EP at the 2018 Vodafone Ghana Music Awards.

== Last Two Departure ==
In December 2016, he parted ways with The Last Two Label and signed a 4-year management deal with Spyder Lee Entertainment. However he's currently under his own creation by name TeePhlow Music/ Revolve Records.

=== Tracklist ===
Track	Title
1	Dues
2	Honeymoon
3	Weather No
4	Shine
5	Ash3daa
6	Riding
7	Phlowducation
8	Money
9	Amen
10	Hosanna
11	God Bless You
12	Handkerchief
13	Koomi
14	Sei Hor
15	Dab on DeM
16	Outside
17	Dede
18	The Warning
19	Enter
20	State of the Art
21	Preach
22	Red Velvet
23	Forgive
24	Blessing
25	Gemini
26	Fetu

== Awards and nominations ==
List of awards and nominations received by Teephlow
Year	Event	Prize	Nominated work	Result	Ref
2019	Ghana Entertainment Awards USA	Best Hiplife/ Rap Act		Nominated	
2019	Vodafone Ghana Music Awards	Rapper of The Year	Preach	Nominated	
2019	Vodafone Ghana Music Awards	Song Writer of The Year	Forgive	Nominated	
2018	Vodafone Ghana Music Awards	Record of the Year	State of the Art	Won	
2018	Vodafone Ghana Music Awards	Best Rapper of the Year	State of the Art	Nominated	
2018	Vodafone Ghana Music Awards	Hip-hop Song of the Year	State of the Art	Nominated	
2017	Central Music Awards	Best Rapper Of The Year	Phlowducation	Won	
2016	Central Music Awards	Male Artiste of the Year	Self	Won	
2016	Central Music Awards	Best Music Video of the Year	The Warning feat Sarkodie	Nominated	
2016	Central Music Awards	Song of the Year	Weather No	Won	
2016	Central Music Awards	Best Rapper of the Year	Self	Won	
2015	Jigwe Awards	Discovery of the Year	JIGWE Discovery of the Year	Won	

== Competition ==
- 2012: Next Big Thing in GH Hip Pop: 1st Runner Up
