= KK Fosu =

Ghanaian musician

- Born: Kaakyire Kwame Fosu; February 14, 1981 (age 44)
- Origin: Ghana
- Genres: Highlife; hiplife
- Occupation: Musician
- Instrument: Vocals

Kaakyire Kwame Fosu (born 14 February 1981) is a Ghanaian hiplife musician known by stage name KK Fosu.He is known for songs like "Suudwe", "Anadwo Yede" among others.

== Life and career ==
KK Fosu started music at a tender age with a junior school choir back in Secondary School. He joined a live band group named "Soundz Unlimited" where he played for two years. He was later signed by DKB Productions.

KK Fosu has released five albums titled "Sudwe", "Anadwo Yede", "6'oclock", Akonoba" and "Toffee". He has worked with musicians like Obrafour, Obour, Reggie Rockstone and several others.

== Demonstration ==
In September 2020, KK Fosu led a demonstration together with the Mangoase Youth Association over the bad state of roads in Mangoase, Adawso and Tinkong roads.

== Accident ==
It is reported that on May 25, 2024, he was involved in an accident that claimed one person's life and left him with a bone fracture in his leg while on their way to a concert with a colleague musician named Bless.
