= Epixode =

Ghanaian musician and fine art painter (born 1990)

- Born: Theophilus Nii Arday Otoo; 16 March 1990 (age 36); Jamestown, Accra, Ghana
- Genres: Reggae, Dancehall, Highlife
- Occupations: Singer, songwriter, painter, creative director
- Instrument: Vocals
- Years active: 2010–present

Theophilus Nii Arday Otoo (born 16 March 1990), known professionally as Epixode, is a Ghanaian reggae–dancehall singer, painter, and creative director.

== Early life ==
Epixode was born and raised in Jamestown, Accra, where he was exposed to traditional Ghanaian music through his mother, a cultural music performer. He began writing and performing music in his early teens, winning local dancehall competitions by the early 2010s.

== Career ==
Epixode's style blends reggae, dancehall, highlife, and Afrobeats, using English, Ga, Twi, and Jamaican patois. His singles include Atia, Stubborn Souljah, Too Much, Wahala Dey, and Efie Nsem.

In 2023, he performed at the Afro Summer Jam in Switzerland. He also performed at the Reggae Geel in Belgium, and headlined the Highlife Konnect Concert in Zurich in 2023. He has also stated publicly that he sees himself as part of a movement to revive Ghanaian highlife music.

=== Notable collaborations ===
- Stonebwoy – collaborated on Jehovah

== Awards and recognition ==
=== Vodafone Ghana Music Awards ===
- 2021: Winner – Best Reggae/Dancehall Artiste of the Year
- 2024: Winner – Reggae/Dancehall Song of the Year
- TGMAs 2025 Music for Good Award winner

=== International Reggae and World Music Awards ===
- 2021: Nominated – Best African Entertainer

== Artistry ==
Epixode is a trained visual artist. He has designed album art, stage visuals, and promotional graphics, and is credited with creating the SM logo for Shatta Wale. He also advocates for preserving Ghana's music heritage through cataloging and archiving artist works. In 2024, he launched a cultural initiative coaching underserved youth in arts and music.

== Discography ==
=== Singles and EPs ===
- Atia (Hi Life Rendition) featuring Kwabena Kwabena (2022)
- Jehovah featuring Stonebwoy (2022)
- Stubborn Souljah (2023)
- Obra (Nyame Bra) featuring Santrofi (2023)
- Millions (2025)
- Agbo (2025)
- Chop n' Go (2024)
- Obi Girl (2024)
- Chooboi (2024)
- Nyash featuring Krus Band (2024)
- Efie Nsem with Krus Band (2024)

=== Albums / EPs ===
- Atia – The Archive (2022)
