= Barima Sidney =

Ghanaian musician and entrepreneur (b. 1977)

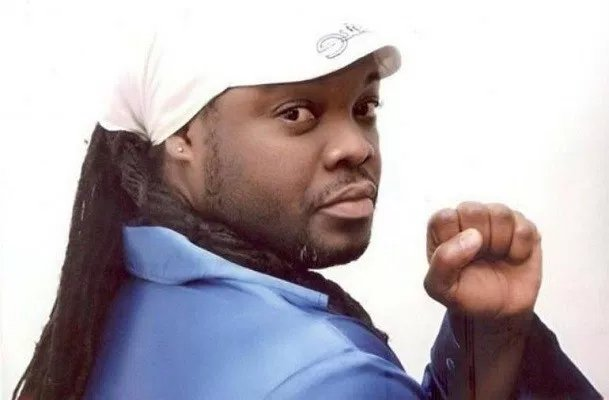

Background information
- Also known as: Rap Ninja
- Born: Sidney Kofi Ofori; 3 June 1977 (age 49); Accra, Ghana
- Origin: Accra, Ghana
- Genres: Hiplife; Revolutionary song
- Occupations: Rapper; Entrepreneur
- Years active: 1996–present
- Labels: Goodies Music; Squadi-yie Entertainment

Sidney Kofi Ofori is a Ghanaian hiplife recording artist and entrepreneur known by the stage name Barima Sidney.

He was born in Accra, Ghana, and spent his formative years schooling there. He went to Harvard College and then West African Secondary School where he finished in 1996. He also attended the Institute of Professional Studies (I.P.S.), where he earned a Diploma in Business Studies, marketing (social option).

== Life and music career ==
Since 2001, Sidney has contributed to the Ghanaian music industry with his songs on socio-political issues and has performed in Ghana and abroad.

=== 2001–2003 ===
Sidney gained his early fame in 2001 when he released his debut album, Tinana. The album did very well, and was followed by his sophomore album, Akofna (2003). It featured the controversial song "Abuskeleke." The song became an anthem, and was used to describe short, skimpy or provocative dresses. Sidney describes its meaning as "good investment," which has also been thought to mean investing in prostitution.

=== 2013–2017 ===
Fɔrso Ye No Saa was released in 2012 with two hit tracks: "Enkɔ yie" and "Awuchie Kpɔngɔ." His singles as a solo artist started with "Ebobɔba (Gadindim Gadem)" in 2012, and "Ebobɔba Reloaded" in 2013.

=== Mutashi Movement ===
On February 27, 2016, Sidney formed a non-partisan group called "Mutashi Movement" with the motto "Arise for the Future." The aim of the group was to educate the youth about their rights, freedoms, and role in democracy. The group organized a series of activities including "Total Support for Black Stars" and the It's your Right to Vote campaign, as well as partaking in the Chalewote Festival 2016.

== Recognition and musical style ==
Sidney often raps in his native language Twi, and is considered a controversial and political rapper due to his songs critical of political parties and leaders. He became the first Ghanaian hiplife artist to perform with a live band in Ghana with his performance named "HIP LIVE." "Abuskeleke" was his first hiplife song to be sung live, and as a result was branded the title track of his 2003 album. "Scɛnti Noo," or "Scent Noo," was a controversial hit song that talked about immoral professions.

== Politics ==
Sidney has been very active in politics, branding himself as a strong supporter of certain political parties. In 2003, "Scɛnti Noo" was used as a campaign song by the New Patriotic Party during their tangle with the National Democratic Congress, an opposition party which was then in power, over its rights in the run-up to Ghana's 2004 election. Though the song was released in 2003, it gained popularity in 2004; "Scɛnti Noo" was New Patriotic Party candidate John Kuffour's slogan on which he rode to victory.

The controversy with Sidney's music grew with his 2004 album Obiaa Nye Obiaa, which addressed the debate about equality in society. There was a break after this album where he researched for a year on how to break through in Francophone countries with his music. He released the album Africa Monie in the latter part of 2007. This breakthrough led him to tour and perform in several African countries like Benin, Cameroon, and Chad.

African ruling parties who used "Africa Monie" as a campaign song include Burkina Faso's Congress for Democracy and Progress; Equatorial Guinea's Democratic Party; Côte d'Ivoire's Rally of the Republicans; and just recently, Nigeria's All Progressives Congress. These political parties all followed the lead of Ghana's National Democratic Congress, which unofficially used the song in the campaign against President Kuffuor's regime to win the 2008 Presidential Election.

=== Humanitarian work ===
Liberian President George Weah assigned Sidney to spearhead a massive campaign on the Ebola hemorrhagic fever outbreak. The campaign theme song dubbed: "Ebola; Africa must stand and fight together" was recorded under the cover of Lionel Peterson's "Peace" song. The song was played on BBC World Service to raise awareness on the outbreak of the deadly virus, Ebola hemorrhagic fever.

Sidney was also part of the Child Soldier Campaign, which was launched in Liberia in 2003. "Give them the Pen, and not the Gun" is a song which he dedicated to all child soldiers in the world, especially in Africa. It features Dr. Kaunda, his lyrical partner, and King Ayisoba, a traditional musician.

== Notable performances ==
In 2004, Sidney kicked off his tour in Africa. He performed in several different countries and cities in Africa, including Liberia, Togo, Equatorial Guinea, Nigeria, Chad, Mali, Ivorian Coast, Burkina Faso, and Benin. He also performed at the Afro-pop Festival in Amsterdam in 2004 and toured in some cities and states in Italy including Modena, Napoli, and Brescia. In the United Kingdom, Sidney has performed in London, Milton Keynes, Luton, Leeds, and in Germany he toured around Cologne, Hamburg, and Stuttgart. Barima Sidney has toured in most European countries, including Switzerland.

== Discography ==
Studio albums

- Tinana (2001)
- Abuskeleke (2002)
- Scent no (2003)
- Obia nye Obiaa (2004)
- Africa Monie (Africa Money, 2007)
- Fɔrso (Awuchie Kpongor 2012)
- Donkomi (2013)
- Ayeka (2014)

== Awards and nominations ==
Year	Event	Prize	Recipient	Result	Ref
2017	Ghana Music Awards UK	Most Popular Song of the Year	''Onaapo", "Time Aso"	Won	
