= Patapaa =

Ghanaian hiplife musician

- Also known as: Patapeezy, Patapaa Amisty,
- Born: Daniel Oduro; Central Region
- Genres: Hiplife, Afrobeats
- Occupation: rapper
- Instrument: vocals
- Years active: 2015–present

Justice Amoa, popularly known as Patapaa is an African hiplife musician and a songwriter based in Ghana.

He is the first child in a family of three children and was born in Swedru, Central Region. He is best known for his 2017 debut single "One Corner", which was nominated for the Most Popular Song of the Year category and song of the Year category at the 2018 Vodafone Ghana Music Awards. Before gaining fame with "One Corner", he had released several other songs, including "Akwaaba", "Pozo", and "Na Abon", among many others, but they didn't gain much popularity.

“One Corner” was also nominated as the Song of the Year at the 2018 Vodafone Ghana music awards. In 2018, he was featured on an African international hit titled Akwaaba by one of Ghana's finest producers Guiltybeatz including Mr Eazi and Pappy Kojo.

In 2019 during the Central Music Awards which was held at the Center for National Culture in Cape Coast, Patapaa won the Artist of the Year for the Central Music Awards.

== Awards and nominations ==
Year	Nominee / work	Award	Result
2018	One Corner	Song of the Year	Nominated
2018	One Corner	Hip - Life Song of the Year	Nominated
