= Mary Ghansah =

- Born: Mary Ghansah; May 13, 1959 (age 66)
- Genres: Gospel
- Occupations: Singer, songwriter

Mary Ghansah (born May 13, 1959) is a veteran Ghanaian gospel musician and ordained reverend minister. She is best known for her worship career which spanned over 40 years.

== Personal life ==
Mary, was born to Mr Joseph Ghansah and Madam Elizabeth Anderson in Tema. She is the eldest among five siblings.

After undertaking her basic education in Tema at Tema Aggrey Road School, Mary continued to Kwahuman Secondary School, Nkawkaw and Breman Essikuma Secondary School, Breman Essikuma, for her secondary education. She later became a telephone receptionist after training with P&T Engineering College of Ghana (currently the Ghana Technology University College-Tesano). After acquisition of a Bachelor of Arts (BA) Degree in Theology with Glory Leadership Institute, Sakumono an affiliate of Trinity College, Legon. Mary was awarded in 2012 an honorary doctorate degree by New Covenant International University, Florida, USA.

At an early age of 15 years, Mary begun her music career by joining the singing group of Power House Evangelistic Ministry. Other ministrations over the years with para-church organizations and on her own in Ghana, other African countries (Côte d'Ivoire, Togo and Nigeria) and internationally (in United States of America, France, the Netherlands, Belgium and England), have influenced her music career. Mary is currently credited with over 20 albums, some of which are her own and others classified as spiritual songs from orthodox, Pentecostal and charismatic churches across the nation.

Mary is married to Carl Kwaku Wiafe.

== Awards ==
In 2017, Mary was awarded with the Evergreen Gospel Honour by MUSIGA. She later received a Lifetime Achievement Award in 2019 at the 20th edition of the Vodafone Ghana Music Awards

== Major singles ==
- Okokroko (meaning-Mighty One)
- Onyame nnae (meaning-God does not sleep)
- Agyenkwa Jesus (meaning-Jesus the Saviour)
- Onyame ye ɔdɔɔ (meaning-God is Love)
- Onipa bɛn po ni wo (meaning-What kind of person are you)
- What a friend
- Onyame sɛ ayeyi (meaning - God deserves the praise)
- Enkaa Ekyire (meaning-It is not late)
- Sweet Jesus
- Oguamma Wo Fata (meaning - Worthy is the Lamb)
- Wo Yɛ Onyame (meaning - You are GOD)
