= Eazzy =

Ghanaian musician

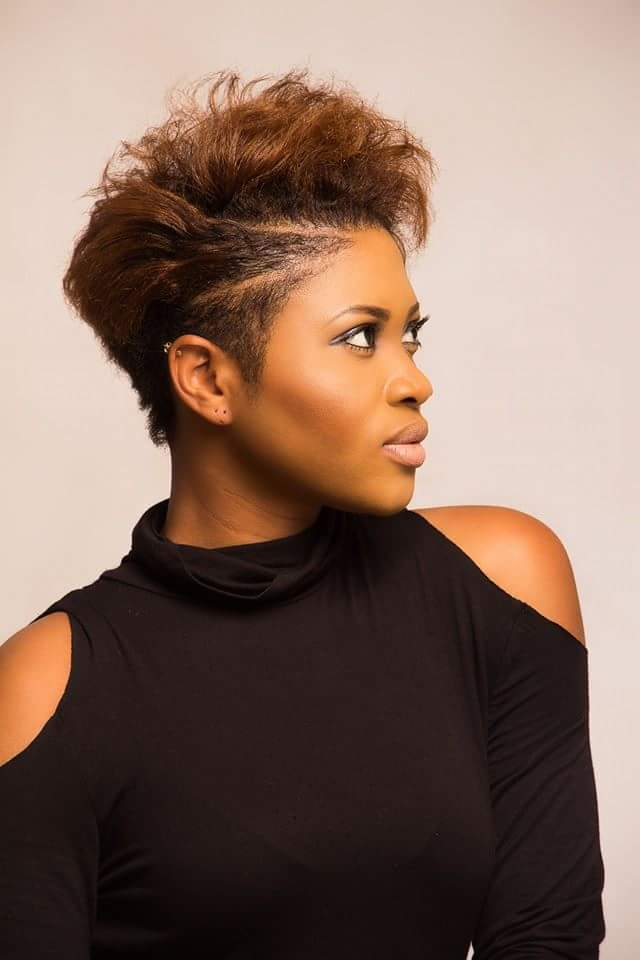

Background information
- Born: Mildred Ashong; 1 August 1986 (age 40); Accra, Ghana
- Genres: Afrobeats; Hip hop
- Occupations: Singer; Songwriter
- Years active: 2010–present
- Label: Eazzy Music / Africori Distribution
- Website: www.eazzymusic.com

Eazzy is the professional name of Mildred Ashong (born August 1, 1986), a Ghanaian singer, rapper, and songwriter.

== Early life ==
Mildred Ashong attended St. Anthony's Junior and JSS School, Mfantsiman Secondary, Institute of Languages, University of Professional Studies, and the Chartered Institute of Marketing (UK). She graduated in Birmingham, England, with a postgraduate diploma in Chartered Marketing in November 2008.

== Career ==
After a year in the music industry, she released her debut album Twinkle in August 2010. It was supported by the three singles: "Bo Wonsem Ma Me", "Wengeze", and "One Gal". The songs earned her two nominations at the 2010 4Syte Music Video Awards, as well as five nominations at the 2011 Ghana Music Awards.

Her collaboration with Richie on the song "One Gal" earned her the award for Best Story Line Video of the Year at the 2011 4Syte Music Video Awards.

In 2012, Eazzy and Lynx Entertainment annulled their business contract and mutually parted ways. She signed with UK-based Africori Distribution in 2014.

Her second album Against All Odds was released on iTunes in 2014. It features the hit singles "Go Go Wind", "Scream", and "Bad to da Bone", the latter featuring vocals from Edem. She hosted the Ghana Music Awards in 2014 and 2015. She was an official judge for The Next Big Thing, a hip hop talent series, and later served as a judge on seasons 4, 5, 7, and 8 of MTN Hitmaker.

She has released several hit singles including "Kpakposhito", "Nana" featuring Stonebwoy, "Forever" featuring Mr Eazi, "Power" featuring Shatta Wale, and the solo Hiplife/Afrobeats single "Obaa Gbemi".

== Personal life ==
Eazzy is in a relationship with Ghanaian rapper Medikal. The couple welcomed their first child, a son named Space Frimpong, on October 17, 2025.

== Discography ==
- Twinkle (2010)
- Against All Odds (2014)
- Solo EP (2019)
- Singles:
  - "Wengeze"
  - "One Gal"
  - "Bo Wonsem Ma Me"
  - "Kpakposhito"
  - "Nana" (feat. Stonebwoy)
  - "Forever" (feat. Mr Eazi)
  - "Power" (feat. Shatta Wale)
  - "Obaa Gbemi"

== Awards ==
- Best Story Line Video of the Year – 4Syte Music Video Awards (2011)
- Best Female Video of the Year – 4Syte Music Video Awards (2016)
- Best Fashion Icon – Ghana Kids Choice Awards
