= DopeNation =

Ghanaian musical duo

- Also known as: B2, Twist
- Born: Michael Boafo; Tony Boafo; Accra, Ghana
- Origin: Saltpond, Central Region, Ghana
- Genres: Afrobeat, Hip hop, Hiplife, Afropop
- Occupations: Recording artist, Sound engineer, Record producer, Performer
- Instruments: Keyboard, sampler
- Years active: 2016–present
- Members: B2; Twist

DopeNation is a Ghanaian musical duo of identical twin brothers, composed of Micheal Boafo popularly known as B2, and Tony Boafo known as Twist. They are best known for producing hit songs such as Kpuu Kpaa by Shatta wale, Wow by Joey B ft EL, Sebgefia by Joey B and EL, Poison by Ebony Reigns, Forever by Eazzy ft Mr Eazi, Nana Ama by Pappy Kojo, among others and chunning out hits for themselves as Artists.

== Early life ==
The twins were born in the Accra and grew up in Abeka, a community in Accra. They later moved to Takoradi where they had their junior and senior education at Ghana Secondary Technical School and Sekondi College. During this period, the twins developed their interest in music. They later returned to Accra to further their tertiary education in the University of Ghana and Ghana Technology University College.

== Production career ==
DopeNation was introduced to music production in 2012 by musician and producer E.L in Accra who nurtured their talents. They have been credited with producing songs for Ghanaian artists including E.L, Shatta Wale, Joey B, Pappy Kojo, Eazzy, Flowking Stone, Olamide, Tekno, Fameye among others.

In 2021, they discovered and introduced visually impaired singer, Adelaide The Seer, to the music scene as her official producers, going on to release the singles, “Wire Me” and “What a God“ among others.

== Music career ==
DopeNation released their first single, “Bebia Ye Shi” in 2016, released “Uh Huh” in 2017 as a follow-up. On 2 April 2018, they released the highly acclaimed self-produced single, “Eish”

"Naami", which was their next song, had Nigerian musician Olamide and disc jockey DJ Enimoney, winning them Sound City MVP Group of the year in Africa award. In 2021, a collaborative E.P titled “Music and Dance” with Ghanaian dance duo, Dancegod Lloyd and Afrobeast of DWP Academy was released.

DopeNation was nominated for Music Producer Honor of the Year at the 2017 Ghana Music Honors Awards

== Discography ==
Year	Title	Featured artist	Album	Ref
2022	Kpanla		Non-Album Single	
2022	Bird	Laa Lee, DopeNation & Gold Up	Non-Album Single	
2022	You Can't See Me		DopeNation Can Rap	
2022	NDC vs NPP		DopeNation Can Rap	
2022	Gboza		Non-Album Single	
2021	Today		Non-Album Single	
2021	What A God	Adelaide The Seer	Non-Album Single	
2021	Wire Me	Adelaide The Seer	Non-Album Single	
2021	Music and Dance		Non-Album Single	
2021	Zenabu	Dancegod Lloyd x Afrobeast x DWP Academy	Non-Album Single	
2021	Mind Your Business		ATTA	
2021	ATTA		ATTA	
2021	CEO	Medikal	ATTA	
2020	Thank God	Kofi Kinaata		
2019	Zanku		Non-Album Single	
2019	Chairman			
2019	Confam	Medikal	Non-Album Single	
2018	Ibi Tins	Quamina Mp, Eddie Khae, Twitch, Kofi Mole, Tulenkey	Non-Album Single	
2018	Nobody	BVR Album		
2018	Naami	DopeNation x Olamide x Enimoney	Non-Album Single	
2018	Eish		Non-Album Single	
2018	Vibely		Non-Album Single	
2018	Ayeyi	E.L ft DopeNation	Non-Album Single	
2017	Uh Huh		Non-album single	
2016	Another One	Luther and Gemini	Non-album single	
2016	Bebia Ye Shi		Non-album single	

=== Albums & EPs ===
- Atta Album - 2021

=== Production discography ===
Year	Artiste	Song/Album	Producer	Ref
2018	Phabrick ft DopeNation (B2 and Twist)	Vamia We	B2	
2018	Edem	Fokoloyor	B2	
2018	Supa	Ghana 2pac	B2	
2018	Dahlin Gage	Potato	B2	
2018	Lady Pearl	Energizer	B2	
2017	Eazzy	Power ft. Shatta Wale	Twist	
2017	Ruby Chelsea	Sampelele	B2	
2017	Flowking Stone	Away Bus	B2	
2017	Ak Songstress	Bossu ft. Luther	B2	
2017	Tinny	Bugatti ft. Zeal	B2	
2017	Shatta Wale	Shut up ft. Pope Skinny	B2	
2017	Shatta Wale	Aplanke	B2	
2016	Shatta Wale	Kpuu Kpa	B2	
2016	Pappy Kojo	Nana Ama	Twist	
2016	Eazzy ft Mr Eazi	Forever	B2	
2015	Joey B	Wow ft. E.L	B2	

== Videography ==
Year	Title	Director	Ref
2018	Naami	Esianyo Kumodzi	
2018	Eish	Esianyo Kumodzi	
2017	Uh Huh	Esianyo Kumodzi	
2016	Bebia Ye Shi	Esianyo Kumodzi	

== Awards and nominations ==
=== Ghana Music Awards ===
Year	Recipient / Nominated work	Award	Result	Ref
2021	Thank God	Hiplife Song of the Year	Nominated	
2020	Zanku	Afrobeat Song of the Year	Won	
2020	DopeNation	Best Group of the Year	Won	
2018	DopeNation	Unsung Artiste of the year	Nominated	

=== Ghana Music Awards UK ===
Year	Recipient / Nominated work	Award	Result	Ref
2018	DopeNation	Uncovered Artiste of the Year	Nominated	

=== Ghana Tertiary Awards ===
Year	Recipient / Nominated work	Award	Result	Ref
2017	Twist	Most influential student sound engineer	Won	
2016	B2	Most influential student sound engineer	Won	

=== Ghana Music Honours ===
Year	Recipient / Nominated work	Award	Result	Ref
2021	B2	Music producer of the Year	Nominated	

=== SoundCity MVP Awards ===
Year	Recipient / Nominated work	Award	Result	Ref
2020	DopeNation	Group of the Year	Won	

=== Global Music Awards ===
Year	Recipient / Nominated work	Award	Result	Ref
2021	DopeNation	Group of the Year	Won	

=== Africa Business & Art Awards Europe ===
Year	Recipient / Nominated work	Award	Result	Ref
2019	DopeNation	Group of the Year	Won	

=== 3Music Awards ===
Year	Recipient / Nominated work	Award	Result	Ref
2020	DopeNation	Group of the Year	Won	

=== Western Music Awards ===
Year	Recipient / Nominated work	Award	Result	Ref
2021	DopeNation	Hip Life artiste of the Year	Won	
2020	DopeNation	Group of the Year	Won	

=== Fame Awards ===
Year	Recipient / Nominated work	Award	Result	Ref
2016	B2	Best sound engineer	Won	
