= Guru (Ghanaian rapper) =

Ghanaian rapper, real estate developer, entrepreneur and fashion designer

Guru Nkz Nana Yaw Yeboah Adjei
- Also known as: Guru Nkz
- Born: Maradona Yeboah Adjei; May 7, 1987 (age 39); Accra, Ghana
- Genres: Hip hop; Afrobeats; Azonto; Hiplife
- Occupations: Rapper; Songwriter; Performer; CEO Money Yard Real Estate; CEO City Cottage Real Estate; CEO Nkz Yard Restaurant; Fashion Designer
- Years active: 2007–present
- Label: NKZ Music
- Website: gurunkz.com

Maradona Yeboah Adjei (born May 7, 1987), also known by his stage name Guru Nkz, is a Ghanaian rapper, real estate developer, entrepreneur, and fashion designer. He served as the 67th SRC President of the University of Ghana. He is known for his contemporary hip-hop rap style that blends English with Ghanaian indigenous languages. Guru Nkz's breakthrough came in with his feature on the song "Kasiebor" with Obrafuor and "Bra be hwe" with Sarkodie in 2009. In 2011, he had his first major hit song "Lapaz Toyota", which charted on Ghanaian music charts.

== Early life and education ==
Guru was born on 7 May 1987 in Accra, and grew up in the small town of Nkoranza, in the Brong/Ahafo Region of Ghana. As an adolescent, he attended the Reverend John Teye Memorial Institute and studied at a secondary school in Apam. He continued his education at NIIT and at IPMC, studying architecture and computer networking. Afterwards, he attended Zenith College in Accra to study marketing.

Guru did not pursue music as a career until he found himself performing at large events while in school, like Miss SSS, a national contest in Ghana. He also made appearances on national radio programmes. Guru was the first artist to win the WAPPI Talent Discovery Program in 2008, a national contest seeking underground music artists.

On 18 September 2024, Guru won the Students’ Representative Council (SRC) presidential election at the University of Ghana.

== Music career ==
Guru recorded his first mixtape video with Ghanaian music artist Sarkodie in late 2009. His first major feature, was on Obrafour's song "Kasiebo", where he was named best featured artist by the 4Syte TV Music Video Awards. He came out with his first studio album, Platform, which also featured Sarkodie. Platform received six Vodafone Ghana Music Award nominations.

In 2011, he released the single "Lapaz Toyota". Influenced by the Azonto style sounds, the song became a hit. It was referenced by politicians during campaigns and played at the Big Brother Africa finals. The video for the song was awarded the best male act by the City People Entertainment Awards. The same year, he also released the single "Karaoke".

In 2013, Guru came out with six singles: "Amen", "Azonoto Boys", "Abena", "Nkwada Nkwada" and "Alkayida (Boys Abre)". "Alkayida (Boys Abre)" came under fire from the government when some officials claimed it "promoted terrorism" because of the similarity of the song's title to terrorist organization Al-Qaeda. Guru refuted the ban, claiming it was a song meant to encourage hard work, not violence, saying: "Ghana is a peaceful country, so why would I do a song to promote violence? I thought carefully about the song before coming out with it."

In 2015, Guru collaborated with Sarkodie on the song "Baggy Jeans". At the 2015 Ghana Music Awards, he received a nomination for hip-hop artist of the year and best hip-hop song of the year for "Pooley Swag". He was described by hip-hop artist Jidenna, as one of the greatest hip-hop artists in Africa, along with WizKid, Don Jazzy, and Akon. In spite of several nominations for music awards, including four major categories in the 2015 4Syte Music Video Awards, Guru has yet to win any, causing some to wonder if there is some inner industry turmoil.

In 2018, Guru released his album Journey of Judah, featuring Harrysong, Sarkodie, Lil Shaker, and Ofori Amponsah.

== Discography ==
Songs	Year
Who Born Dog	2021
