= Samini =

Ghanaian dancehall musician

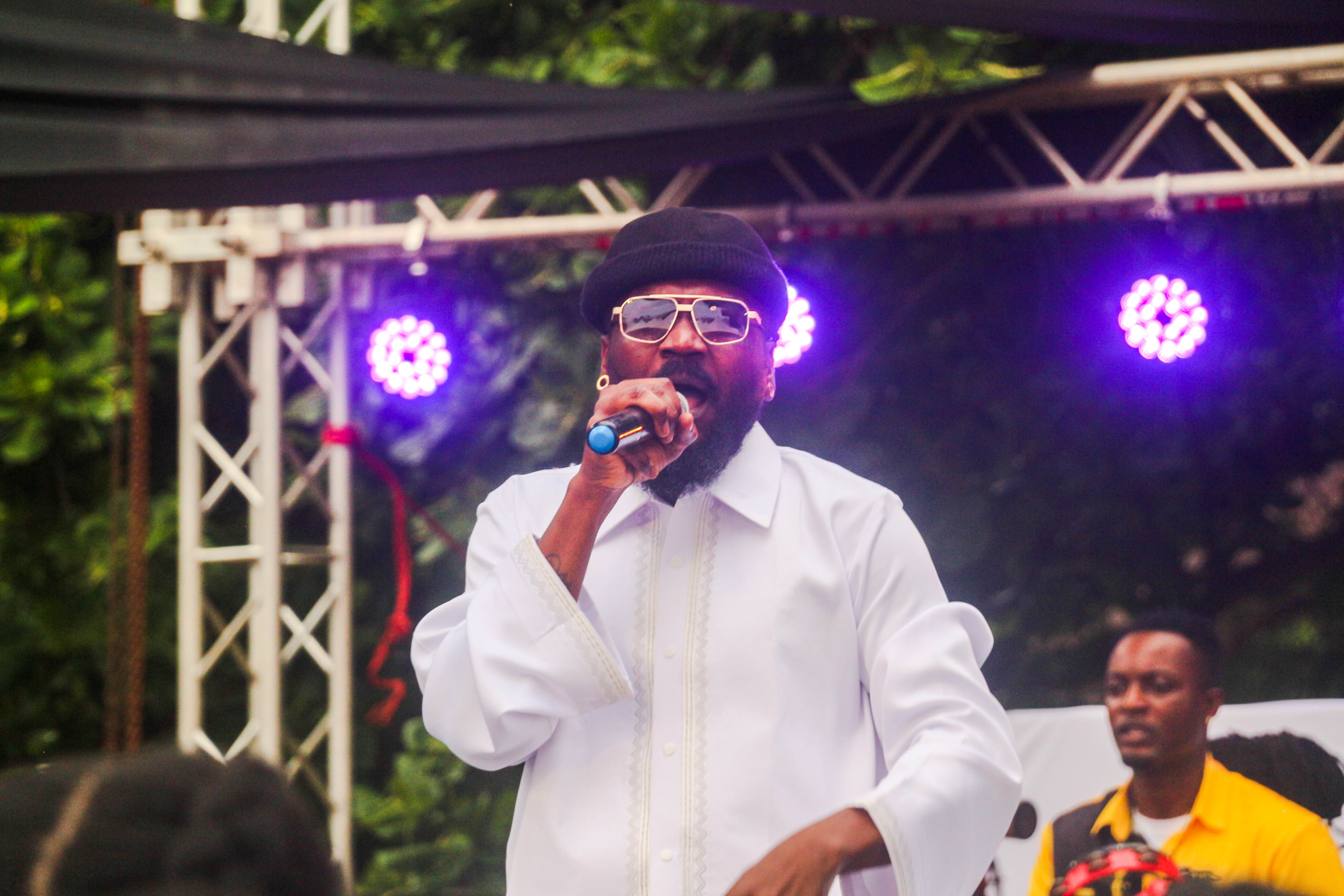

Background information
- Also known as: Samini, Batman Samini
- Born: Emmanuel Andrews Samini; 22 December 1981 (age 44); Accra, Ghana
- Origin: Dansoman, Accra, Ghana
- Genres: Dancehall, reggae, hip-life
- Occupations: Rapper, raga, singer, actor, entrepreneur
- Instruments: Vocals, Acoustic
- Years active: 1999–present
- Label: High Grade Family

Emmanuel Andrews Sammini (born 22 December 1982, in Accra, Ghana), known by his stage name Samini (formerly as Batman Samini), is a Ghanaian reggae and dancehall recording artist from Wa, Ghana. His genre of music is a melodious mixture of high life, dance hall, reggae and hip-hop. He terms his brand of music "African dance hall". He signed his first record deal with Ashanti International. Samini started his record label after he left the aforementioned label.

Samini has released seven studio albums, with all being highly successful on the commercial market. Samini's success and recognition began when his first single, Linda, was released and subsequently appearing on other successful singles by other artists.

On 13 December 2018, Samini was en-skinned as a Chief in his home town. The title given to him by the WaNaa (Paramount Chief of Wa) is `Pebilii Naa’, which means `King of the Rocks’ in Wa.

Samini holds a bachelor's degree in Project Management from Ghana Institute of Management and Public Administration (GIMPA). He served as President of GIMPA Students Representative Council (SRC) during his final year at the institution.

After completion, Samini had his first major performance at the 'Re-ignition Concert' at the Kwame Nkrumah Mausoleum in Accra. He said that "it felt great, it's a good way to come back, it's a good way to get started again after a three and a half year break of active music."

== Background information ==
Sammini started singing in a church choir at the age of 14 and became a professional musician after a musical collaboration with another musician in 1999. His debut studio album, Dankwasere, was released in 2004; it topped the local music charts for weeks and won two awards at the Ghana Music Awards. The album was supported by the single "Linda". He has performed alongside Sean Paul, Akon, Kevin Little, Shaggy, Wayne Wonder, Damian Marley, Beenie Man, Jay-Z, Chaka Demus & Pliers, Culture (Joseph Hill), and Steel Pulse. He collaborated with Steel Pulse and Etana from Jamaica. He has received international recognition and toured the UK, Germany, Italy, Canada, and the Netherlands.

He received international recognition when he won the "Best African Act" at the 2006 MOBO Awards. After releasing his second self-titled studio album, Samini, he won three awards at the then 2007 Vodafone Ghana Music Awards. In February 2008, Samini won the "African Artiste of the Year" award at The Headies. His third studio album, Dagaati, was released in 2008. After launching his 7th studio album on 22 December 2018 titled UNTAMED he won the Reggaeville 2018, Album of the Year.

== Personal life ==
Samini was born to Mr G.A. Samini and Theresa Nusala, who were residing in Dansoman when Samini was only 9 years old. The names of his children are Haile Micaiah Yidaana Gansonye Samini, Ayana Samini, Toyila Samini, Emmanuel Andrew Tafari Samini Jnr, and Yelisung Samini.

== Discography ==
=== Studio albums ===
- Dankwasere (2004)
- Samini (2007)
- Dagaati (2008)
- C.E.O (2010)
- Next Page (2013)
- Breaking News (2015)
- Untamed (2018)
- Origin8a(2026)

== Singles ==
- Tsoobi featuring Rowan, Senario & Razben
- Good Vibes

Year	Title	Album	Ref
2016	Party Away		
2019	tshoobi		{{usurped|1=[https://web.archive.org/web/20200121063319/https://www.dcleakers.com/high-grade-family-ft-samini-senario-razben-rowan-tsoobi-prod-by-brainybeatz/]}}
2019	Hallelujah		
2019	Celebration		[https://www.reverbnation.com/play_now/31397778]

== Videography ==
Year	Title	Director	Ref
2015	Enkasa As featured artist	—N/a	
2016	Ye Ko Paapi	—N/a	
2015	New Style	—N/a	
2017	My Own	—N/a	
2018	Obaa	—N/a	
2019	tsoobi	Slingshots	

== Awards and nominations ==
Samini awards and nominations
Awards and nominations
Award	Wins	Nominations
Ghana Music Awards	9	16
MTV Europe Music Awards	0	1
MTV Africa Music Awards	1	2
IRAWMA Awards	1	1
Bass Awards	3	3
MOAMA Awards	0	1
Ghana DJ Awards	0	1
Black Canadian Awards	0	1
Channel O Music Video Awards	1	4
The Headies	1	1

=== MOBO Awards ===
Year	Nominee / work	Award	Result
2006	Himself	Best African Act	Won

=== The Headies ===
Year	Nominee / work	Award	Result
2010	Himself	Best African Act	Won

=== Channel O Music Video Awards ===
Year	Nominee / work	Award	Result
2011	Himself	Most Gifted Reggae Dancehall Video Artist	Won

=== Bass Awards ===
Year	Nominee / work	Award	Result
2013	Himself	Kwame Nkrumah Award (Artiste of the Year)	Won
2013	Himself	Best Performer(Reggae/Dancehall)	Won
2013	Himself	Best Dancehall Artiste	Won

=== MTV Africa Music Awards ===
Year	Nominee / work	Award	Result
2009	Himself	Best Performer	Won

=== Ghana Music Awards ===
Year	Nominee / work	Award	Result
2005	Himself	Artiste of the Year	Won
2005	Himself	HipLife Artist of the Year	Won
2007	Himself	African Magic Artiste of the Year	Won
2007	Himself	Pop Song of the Year	Won
2007	Himself	Record Song of the Year	Won
2011	Himself	Album of the Year	Won
2021	Himself	Reggae Dance-hall Song of The Year	Nominated

=== Nominations ===
- 2006 MTV Europe Music Awards 2006 – Best African Act
- 2008 MTV Africa Music Awards – Best Performer
- Black Canadian Awards 2014– Best International Act
- Ghana Music Awards 2014– Artist of the Year
- Ghana Music Awards 2014– Reggae Dance hall Song (scatter bad mind)
- Ghana Music Awards 2011– Artist of the Year
- Ghana Music Awards 2011 – Afro Pop Song of the Year
- Ghana Music Awards 2011– Album of the Year
- Ghana Music Awards 2012– Reggae Song of the Year
- IRWM Awards- Best African Entertainer
- Bass Awards 2013– Most Popular Dance hall Song
- Bass Awards 2013– Best Collaboration (Time Bomb ft wiz kid)
- Bass Awards 2013– Best Dance hall Music Video
- MOAMA Awards 2010– Best African album
- Ghana DJ Awards- Song of the Year 2010
- Ghana Music Awards UK 2018 – Reggae/Dance hall song of the year
- Ghana music awards UK 2019-Special recognition award
- Ghana Music Awards 2020-Reggae/Dance hall artist of the year
- Ghana Music Awards 2021- Reggae/Dance hall song of the year
