= List of record labels from Ghana =

Lists of record labels in Ghana cover record labels associated with marketing of music recordings and music videos. The list is organized by name, founder and signed artists.

Name	Founder	Signed Acts	Date Founded
Lynx Entertainment	Richie	Richie, ASEM, Irene Logan, OJ Blaq, Eazzy, Zigi, Jayla, MzVee, KiDi, Kuami Eugene and DopeNation	2006
Highly Spiritual Music	Kaywa	Kurl Song, Mr Drew, Krymi, Yaw Berk, Rashelle Blue, King Maaga and Lasmid	
Sarkcess Music	Sarkodie	Sarkodie, Akwaboah and Strongman	
MicBurnerz Music	Azee Ntwene (real name Joseph Jenkins Mensah)	Strongman and Amerado	
Worldwide Music	Dr. Abdul Abass Mohammed		2022
Burniton Music	Stonebwoy	Stonebwoy, Kelvyn Boy and OV	
GroundUp	Glen Gyan	Kwesi Arthur, Kofi Mole, Quamina MP, Twitch	
Living Life Records	Rabby Jones & Sean Lifer	Jay Bahd, O'Kenneth, Bra Benk, Skyface, Kawabanga, Reggie, City Boy, Kwaku DMC, Sean Lifer	
BBnz Live	Alvin Bekoe & Kwame Blay	E.L, Kojo Cue, Lil Shaker, DJ Juls	
Shatta Movement Records	Shatta Wale	Shatta Wale, Militants (Natty Lee, Captan, Addi Self, Joint 77), Ara-B	
RuffTown Records	Bullet	Ebony, Wendy Shay, Kiki Marley, Brella and Fantana	
Black Avenue Music	D Black	DBlack, Wisa Gried, S3fa, Dahlin Gage, Freda Rhymz, Ms Forson, Nina Ricchie, Osayo, DJ Breezy and Kobla Jnr	2008
Audio Flow Records	Dodzi Viku	Boy Faya	2022
Trust Music Records	Frank k. Harrison		2019
WAYon Recordings	Kay Study (real name Issah Mohammed)	Kay Study	2025
2 Fine Music	RG Qluck Wise	RG Qluck Wise	2025

== See also ==
- Music of Ghana
