= Kweku Flick =

Ghanaian musician (born 2001)

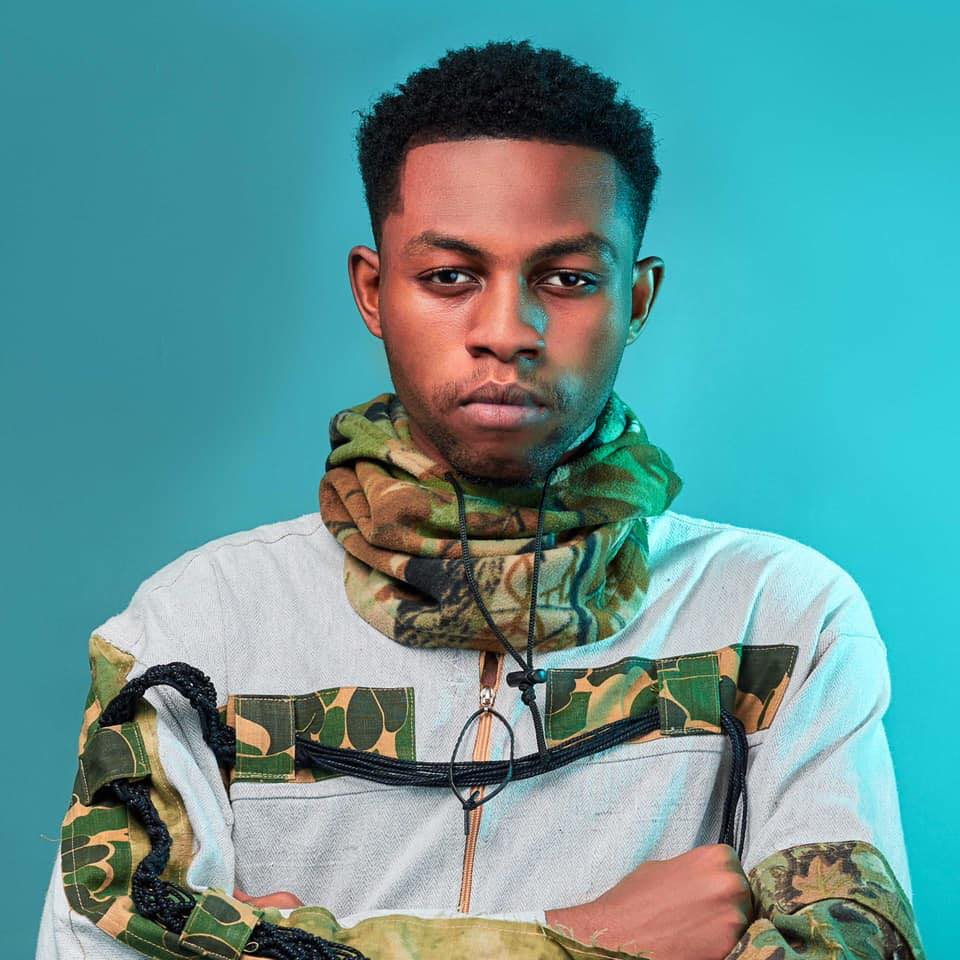

Background information
- Born: Andy Osei Sarfo; 16 May 2001 (age 25); Kumasi, Ghana
- Genres: Hip hop, Highlife, Drill, Afrobeats
- Occupations: singer, songwriter, performer
- Years active: 2020-present
- Label: BKC Music

Andy Osei Sarfo (born 16 May 2001), professionally known as Kweku Flick is a Ghanaian musician and songwriter from Abrepo. His path to stardom was paved by the release of his track titled "Money" in 2020.

== Early life and education ==
Kweku originates from Mampong, a town in the Ashanti region. He is a member of a five-sibling family. He commenced his primary schooling at Saint Georges in Kumasi and proceeded with his junior high education at Pentecost Preparatory School. In 2020, he concluded his secondary education at St. Hubert Seminary School.

== Career ==
Kweku Flick introduced his debut single titled "Awake", followed by a subsequent track named "Money", propelling him to prominence both in Ghana and various global regions. He has engaged in collaborations with fellow artists such as Sista Afia, Yaw Tog, Sarkodie, Amerado, Strongman, Black Sherif, Kofi Jamar and Kojo Cue. In 2020, he was featured on a song titled "Ahodwo Las Vegas" by Shatta Wale.

Kweku Flick was joined by Smallgod to release a song titled "Blackstars" for the Ghana national football team ahead of the 2022 FIFA World Cup in Qatar, the song had an impressive response from Ghanaian and the football players especially Mohammed Kudus.

== Recognition ==
Kweku Flick frequently croons in his mother tongue, Twi, which is a language indigenous to Ghana. He is recognized as a "versatile artist" owing to his command over a range of musical genres and styles. He mostly introduces his songs with the term PAW' which according to him mean 'Prayers Always Work'. Ace Ghanaian musician Obrafour has also expressed his admiration for his craft. He has gained multiple nominations at the Ghana Music Awards and 3Music Awards.

== Discography ==
=== Singles ===
- Money
- Awake
- Bye Bye
- No Sleeping ft Kuami Eugene
- Ewiase
- Awake
- New Year
- Holding On
- Happy Day
- Blackstars (World Cup Anthem) with Smallgod
- Rastaman
- Attack ft Strongman
- Adwuma N'asi ft Kojo Cue
- Survival

=== Albums ===
- King of Melodies.

== Awards and nominations ==
Year	Award Ceremony	Category	Nominated work	Result	Ref
2023	Ghana Music Awards UK	Hiplife / Hiphop Song Of The Year	Ewiase	Nominated	
2023	Vodafone Ghana Music Awards	Best Hiplife Song Of The Year	Ewiase	Nominated	
2021	Vodafone Ghana Music Awards	Best New Artist Of The Year	Himself	Nominated	
2021	Vodafone Ghana Music Awards	Best Hiphop Song Of The Year	Money	Nominated	
2021	3Music Awards	Breakthrough Artist Of The Year	Himself	Nominated	
2021	3Music Awards	Song Of The Year	Money	Nominated	
2021	3Music Awards	Hiplife/Hiphop Artist Of The Year	Himself	Nominated	
2021	3Music Awards	Hiphop Song Of The Year	Money	Nominated	
2021	Ghana Music Awards USA	New Artist Of The Year	Himself	Nominated	
2021	4Syte TV Music Video Awards	Most Popular Video	Money	Nominated	
