= Reign (album) =

Shatta Wale album

Studio album by Shatta Wale
- Released: October 13, 2018
- Recorded: 2017–2018
- Length: 53:00
- Label: Zylofon Music; Shatta Movement Empire
- Producer: Nana Appiah Mensah (exec.); Charles Nii Armah Mensah (also exec.); MOG; Da Maker; Damage Muzik; Shawerz Ebiem; DJ Milzy

Shatta Wale chronology
After the Storm (2016)	Reign (2018)

Singles from Reign
- 1. "Gringo" Released: April 27, 2018; 2. "Amount" Released: July 23, 2018; 3. "Mind Made Up" Released: October 10, 2018

Reign is the third studio album by Ghanaian artist Shatta Wale, released on October 13, 2018, by Zylofon Music and Shatta Movement Empire.

== Background ==
Prior to the release of Reign, Wale embarked on a media tour to promote its launch. During one of his interviews, Wale made comments which rapper Sarkodie did not like, so Sarkodie released the diss track "Advice" directed at Wale as a result. The diss track generated heated debate, with some pundits predicting it would have a negative impact on the album launch, but the launch at the Fantasy Dome in Accra was considered successful, with thousands of fans attending. Some also criticized the diss track as an attempt to dampen the praise Reign was receiving.

== Commercial performance ==
Reign debuted at number 6 on the Billboard Top World Albums Chart october ,2018 .... it is a debut (NEW) Album which can only be traced by image saved, {THE WEEK'S MOST POPULAR WORLD MUSIC ALBUMS CHARTS, BASED ON MULTIMETRIC CONSUMPTION, BLENDING TRADITIONAL ALBUM SALES, STREAMING ...} .

== Track listing ==
No.	Title	Writer(s)	Producer(s)	Length
1.	"Don't Baby My Baby"	Nii Armah Mensah	MOG	3:09
2.	"Bend Over"	Nii Armah Mensah	MOG	3:52
3.	"Squeeze"	Nii Armah Mensah	MOG	3:12
4.	"I Regret"	Nii Armah Mensah	DJ Milzy	3:18
5.	"If I See"	Nii Armah Mensah	MOG	3:45
6.	"Give Dem Something"	Nii Armah Mensah	MOG	3:03
7.	"Crazy"	Nii Armah Mensah	MOG	3:28
8.	"Amount"	Nii Armah Mensah	MOG	3:00
9.	"Wonders" (featuring Olamide)	Nii Armah Mensah; Olamide Adedeji	MOG	3:35
10.	"Rosalinda"	Nii Armah Mensah	MOG	2:44
11.	"Sister Sister"	Nii Armah Mensah	MOG	3:57
12.	"Mama Stories"	Nii Armah Mensah	Damage Muzik	3:39
13.	"Gringo"	Nii Armah Mensah	Da Maker	3:39
14.	"My Mind Is Made Up"	Nii Armah Mensah	Da Maker	2:51
15.	"Caesar"	Nii Armah Mensah	Da Maker	2:31
16.	"Exodus"	Nii Armah Mensah	Da Maker	2:04
17.	"One Way Style"	Nii Armah Mensah	Shawerz Ebiem	3:29
Total length:				53:00
