= Richie Mensah =

Ghanaian singer-songwriter

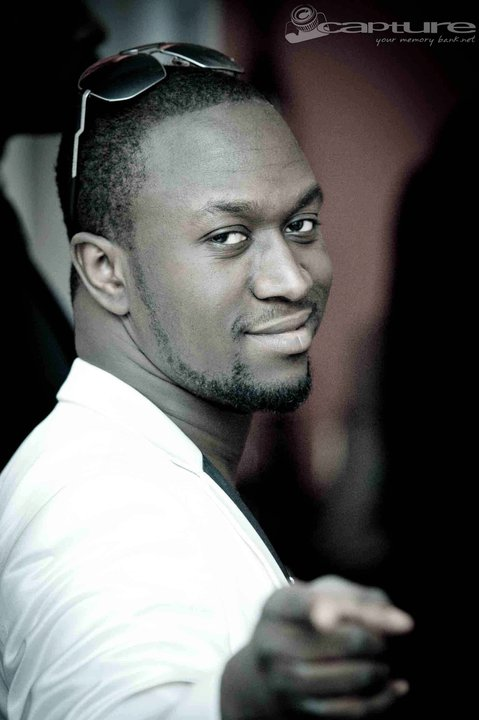
- Richie Mensah

Background information
- Born: Richard Mensah; 17 May 1986 (age 40)
- Origin: Accra, Ghana
- Genres: R&B, Hiplife
- Occupations: Singer-songwriter, record producer
- Years active: 2007–present
- Label: Lynx Entertainment
- Website: richiemensahgh.com

Richie Mensah (born 17 May 1986), better known by his stage name Richie, is a Ghanaian singer-songwriter and record producer. After producing records for several artists, Richie set up Lynx Entertainment record label and released his debut album All of Me on the label in 2008. He has since then gone on to win several awards both as a singer and record producer and is fast establishing himself as one of the biggest names in the Ghanaian music industry. In 2025, the Grammy names him as a voting Academy member for the 68th Awards.

== Early life ==
Richie was born in Accra, Ghana, and started performing at the age of six with his brother and sister at local variety shows. He decided to embark on a career in music while studying science at Achimota Senior High School, Accra. Richie graduated from Achimota Senior High School in 2003 and started producing records while studying computer software engineering at NIIT, Accra.

== Music career ==
=== Establishing Lynx Entertainment ===
Richie set up Lynx Entertainment in 2006 and became the first artist signed to the record label. He went on to sign ASEM, OJ Blaq, Irene Logan, Eazzy, Zigi and MzVee as well as producing for and collaborating with Tinny, Okyeame Kwame, VIP, Praye, Bradez, Irene and Jane, Obour, Becca and several other big names in the Ghanaian music industry. He also worked on Originality the third album of Nigerian R&B star Faze. The artistes on the record label have had critical and commercial success with songs such as "Frema", "Pigaro", "Runaway", "Wengeze", "No More Kpayor", "You Say Wey Tin" and "One Gal" with the label winning the "record label of the year" award at the Ghana Music Awards in 2009. In 2010, the artistes on the Lynx Entertainment record label Richie, ASEM, OJ Blaq, Eazzy and Zigi collaborated on Africa's Moment, which was featured on Hello Afrika, Sony Music's release in conjunction with the 2010 FIFA World Cup in South Africa. The song was also featured in the Vodafone advert that staged the first ever flashmob in West Africa. Lynx Entertainment released Back 2 Zero in July 2011. The album featured all the artistes on the record label as well as several renowned Ghanaian musicians such as Gyedu Blay-Ambolley, Tinny, V.I.P, Okyeame Kwame, Efya, Trigmatic, Sonni Balli, EL, Jael Wiafe, Ayigbe Edem and Iwan.

=== 2008–present: producer and recording artiste ===
After producing songs for several African artistes, Richie released his debut album All of Me in 2008. The album featured hit singles "Frema", "When I Get You" and "Dirty Dance". The release of this album established Richie as one of the hottest R&B stars on the Ghanaian music scene and led to award nominations at the 2009 Ghana Music Awards for "Discovery of the Year", "Best Male Vocal", "Hip Hop Song of the Year", "Afro Pop Song of the Year" and "Collaboration of the Year". He won the award for ‘Producer of the Year’ at the ceremony, his record label Lynx Entertainment won "Record Label of the Year" and "Woso", a song by Okyeame Kwame, which he produced and featured on won "Hip Hop Song of the Year" and "Video of the Year". He also won "Male Music Star of the Year" award at the 2009 Joy FM's Nite with the Stars. Richie again won the award for "Producer of the Year" at the 2010 Ghana Music Awards and "Simple", a song he produced for the Ghanaian music duo Bradez, won "Most Popular Song of the Year" at the Ghana Music Awards in 2010 and "West African Song of the Year" at the 2010 Museke Online African Music Awards. His second album UKNR was released in May 2010 and featured hit singles "Yaaro", "Asa Fofro" featuring SK Blinks, "Ma Nim Ton" featuring Tinny and ‘Intoxicated’ featuring Sway which was nominated for "Hip Hop Song of the Year" at the 2011 Ghana Music Awards. In February 2012, Richie released "Changing Faces", the first single from his third album also titled Changing Faces.

Richie continues to nurture young talent and has established "Lynx School of Arts", a performing arts school in Ghana for talented people looking to enter the entertainment business

In 2012, he signed an all female group called D3 to his Lynx Entertainment record label. The group, released hit singles such as 'Good Girls Gone Bad' and 'Gyani Gyani' before splitting at the end of 2013 due to educational commitments of the young group members. The lead singer of the group, MzVee was subsequently signed to the record label as a solo artiste and went on to release three albums under the label, Reveelation in 2014, Verified in 2015, and DaaVee in 2017 to commercial and critical acclaim.

Richie is also a mentor on MTN's Hitmaker, Ghana's largest music talent show The show launched in 2012 is now in its ninth season.

He also has two afrobeats stars, KiDi and Kuami Eugene, signed to his label.

In January 2017, Richie was appointed Director of Music and Industry Standards by the Musicians Union of Ghana (MUSIGA) to work with MUSIGA's newly established Membership and Business Development Office and lead on their industry standardization efforts.

=== Recording Academy membership ===
In October 2025, Richie Mensah was officially named a voting member of the Recording Academy (the organization behind the Grammy Awards), giving him the ability to vote on Grammy nominations and awards.

== Masterminds Podcast ==
In the 2025, Richie created and began hosting Masterminds, a podcast centered on personal development, creativity, leadership, and financial literacy.The podcast features a mix of solo episodes and interviews, in which Richie discusses topics such as mindset, discipline, personal responsibility, and financial awareness, often drawing on his experiences across the entertainment and business sectors. Masterminds is distributed on major digital platforms and forms part of Richie’s broader work in mentorship and education.

== Discography ==
Albums

- All of Me (2008)
- UKNR (2010)

Singles

- Frema – 2007
- When I Get You (ft Asem) – 2008
- London (ft Adina) – 2009
- Intoxicated (ft Sway) – 2010
- Yaaro – 2010
- Asa Fofro (ft SK Blinkz) – 2010
- Changing Faces – 2012
- This is Love – 2012

== Production discography (this includes the following) ==
- Adina – Why
- Adina – Araba album (produced 9 of the songs on the album)
- Afriyie (Wutah) – Love of My Life
- Asem – Give Me Blow
- Asem – Pigaro
- Asem – No More Kpayor
- Asem – Manager
- Asem – School Dey Be
- Asem ft Sway – Suuliya
- Asem – 2010 Fylla
- Asem ft VIP – Ebi Your Own
- Becca ft Samini – Fire
- Black Prophet ft Asem – Behave
- Bradez – Simple
- Chase – Finally
- Chase ft Efya – Give Me Your Heart
- D3 – Good Girls Gone Bad
- Dela ft Asem and Richie – Got Me Bound
- Eazzy – Bo Wonsem Mame
- Eazzy – Wengeze
- Eazzy ft Richie – One Gal
- Eazzy ft Jupitar – Gogo wind
- Echo ft Tinny – Golo Golo
- Efya – Little Things
- Efya – Best in Me
- Irene – Runaway
- Irene – Kabilla
- Irene and Jane – Heated Up
- Lynx ft Asem, Tinny, Okyeame Kwame, Edem, 5Five – Swagger Like Us
- Lynx ft All Stars – Yen Ara Asaase Ni
- Lynx ft Asem, Richie, Zigi, Eazzy, Guru – Fire
- Jay Ghartey ft Tinny – Go Hard All Day
- KiDi – Say You Love Me (co-produced)
- KiDi – Say You Love Me skit
- KiDi – Thunder (co-produced)
- KiDi – For Better For Worse (co-produced)
- KiDi ft Adina – One Man
- Kuami Eugene – Boom Bang Bang (co-produced)
- Kuami Eugene – Ebeyeyie
- Kuami Eugene – Heaven
- Kuami Eugene – Rockstar
- Kuami Eugene – Son of Africa
- Kuami Eugene – Show Body
- Kuami Eugene ft Eddy Kenzo – Give It To Me
- Kwaku T – Kwaku Tutu
- Kwaw Kese ft Prof Jay – Who Be You
- Lady Prempeh ft Asem n Richie – Odo Yi Wohe
- Mimi ft 4x4 – Leave Me Alone
- MzVee ft VVIP – Borkor Borkor
- MzVee ft Stonebwoy – Natural Girl
- MzVee ft Shatta Wale – My Everything
- MzVee ft Pappy Kojo – Mensuro Obia
- MzVee ft Efya – Abofra
- MzVee – Come and See My Moda
- Obour ft Okyeame Kwame n Richie – Killing The Game
- OJ Blaq ft Asem n 4x4 – Chale Wote
- OJ Blaq – Biggie Boy Lover
- Okyeame Kwame ft Richie Woso
- Praye – Wonkoa
- Richie – Frema
- Richie – Yaaro
- Richie – Changes Faces
- Richie ft Asem – When I Get You
- Richie ft Adina – London
- Richie ft Sway – Intoxicated
- Ruff and Smooth – Azingele
- Scientific – Africa Unite
- Shatta Wale ft MzVee – Dancehall Queen
- Stonebwoy – Can't Cool
- Stonebwoy ft MzVee – Come Over
- Tiffany – Fake London Boy
- Tinny – Incomplete
- Tinny ft Asem, Richie, Okyeame Kwame – Ringtone
- Tinny ft Samini n 2Face – Now You Know
- VIP – I Think I Like Am
- Zigi – U Say Weytin
- Zigi ft Sonniballi – Amanda
- Zigi ft Eazzy – Let's Get it Started

== Awards and nominations ==
Year	Organisation	Award	Work	Result
2009	Ghana Music Awards	Discovery of the Year	Himself	Nominated
2009	Ghana Music Awards	Best Male Vocal Performance	Frema	Nominated
2009	Ghana Music Awards	Afro Pop Song of the Year	Frema	Nominated
2009	Ghana Music Awards	Collaboration of the Year	Woso	Nominated
2009	Ghana Music Awards	Producer of the Year	Himself	Won
2009	Ghana Music Awards	Record Label of the Year	Lynx Entertainment	Won
2009	Joy FM's Nite with the Stars	Male Music Star of the Year	Himself	Won
2010	Ghana Music Awards	Producer of the Year	Himself	Won
2010	4syte Music Video Awards	Best Male Video	When I Get You	Nominated
2010	4syte Music Video Awards	Best Male Video	When I Get You	Nominated
2010	4syte Music Video Awards	Best Choreography	When I Get You	Nominated
2010	4syte Music Video Awards	Best Collaboration	The Game	Nominated
2011	Ghana Music Awards	Hip Hop Song of the Year	Himself	Nominated
2011	4syte Music Video Awards	Best Editing	Intoxicated	Nominated
2011	4syte Music Video Awards	Best Choreography	Asa Fofro	Won
2011	4syte Music Video Awards	Best Collaboration	One Gal	Nominated
2021	Ghana Music Awards	Sound Engineer of the Year	Himself	Won
2021	Ghana Music Awards	Producer of the Year	Himself	Won
2022	Exclusive Men of the Year Africa Awards	Young Achiever	Himself	Won
