= Shatta (disambiguation) =

Shatta was a Palestinian village in Beit She'an Valley.

Shatta may also refer to:

== People ==
=== First name ===
- Shatta Rako, stage name of Rexford Kojo Amoah (born 1979), Ghanaian musician and graphic designer
- Shatta Wale, stage name of Charles Nii Armah Mensah Jr. (born 1984), Ghanaian musician and record producer

=== Last name ===
- Ahmed Kamel Shatta (1961–2016), Egyptian track and field athlete
- Khalid Shatta (born 1989), Norwegian–Sudanese visual artist

== Other uses ==
- Shatta (condiment), a hot sauce in Levantine cuisine
- Shatta Movement Records, a Ghanaian record label founded by Shatta Wale

== See also ==
- Shata
- Shutta
