= Touch It (Kidi song) =

2021 Song by Kidi

Song by KiDi

from the album Golden Boy
- Released: 5 May 2021
- Genre: afropop
- Length: 2:45
- Label: Lynx Entertainment
- Songwriter: KiDi
- Producers: KiDi, Richie Mensah, Jack Knight

"Touch It" is a single by Ghanaian Afropop artist Kidi. It was released on 5 May 2021 by Lynx Entertainment and distributed by MadeInENY, a subsidiary of EMPIRE as the lead single for his Golden Boy Album. It also debuted at number 20 on the Billboard World Digital Song Sales chart.

== Composition ==
Touch It is an upbeat and energetic Afropop track combining catchy melodies and infectious rhythms. The song takes inspiration from Caribbean reggaeton and moombahton and revolves around happiness, attraction, and desire themes. The song was written by Kidi, who also co-produced it with Richie Mensah, and Jack Knight.

The music video was directed by Rex and premiered on YouTube on May 12, 2021.

== Reception ==
Within three days of release, the video amassed 1 million views on YouTube. It also was certified platinum in India after selling 120,000 copies and is the most streamed Ghanaian song on Spotify.

== Recognition ==
The song received the "Best Reggae Dancehall Song of the Year" award at the 2022 Ghana Music Awards. It won the award for the "Best Reggae Dancehall Song of the Year" category at the 2022 3Music Awards. It was nominated in the Outstanding International Song category of the NAACP Image Awards but lost out to Essence.

== Extensions ==
The influence of the song led to the creation of two extensions for the song.

=== Remix With Tyga ===
After the success of the original, Kidi released a remix for Touch It with a feature from American rapper, Tyga. The audio was released on 15 February 2022 with the video following suit on 16 February 2022.

=== Remix With Tulsi Kumar ===
With Touch It gaining platinum status in India, Kidi and Tulsi Kumar collaborated for the song, Shut Up. It was the Indian rendition of Touch It, with a video shot in Kerala and released on December 17, 2022. The song was composed by Tanishk Bagchi, Jack Knight, and Soundmanlos.

== Release history ==
Region	Date	Format	Notes
Worldwide	5 May 2021	Digital Streaming and digital download	Date released to streaming platforms.
Worldwide	12 May 2021	Video	
Worldwide	15 February 2022	Digital Streaming and digital download	The release date for Touch it Remix with Tyga
Worldwide	Feb 16, 2022	Video	The release date of the official video for Touch It Remix with Tyga
