= Scrip T =

Ghanaian Afro-pop musician

- Born: Gabriel Asare; 7 February 1993 (age 33); Kumasi, Ghana
- Origin: Nottingham, England
- Genres: Afro-pop, Hiplife, Highlife, Hip-hop
- Occupations: Musician; Registered General Nurse
- Years active: 2019–present

Scrip T (born Gabriel Asare, 7 February 1993) is a Ghanaian Afro-pop and hip hop musician based in Nottingham, England. He also works as a Registered General Nurse in the United Kingdom.

== Early life ==
Gabriel Asare grew up in Buokrom Estate, Kumasi, in the Ahwiaa Kwabere East District of the Ashanti Region. He went to Airport International School and later Osei Kyeretwie Senior High School (OKESS), where his classmates voted him Entertainment Prefect.

His elder brother Junior PSL first got him recording seriously. While still in school he linked up with Narkim PSL and Pappy to form PSLmuzik, and the group put out their first freestyle recording in 2012. He later trained as a nurse in Ghana before moving to Nottingham.

== Career ==
=== Music ===
In 2018 Scrip T released "Gimme Joy", a collaboration with Ghanaian rapper Strongman Burner. The following year he was nominated for Unsung Artiste of the Year at the Vodafone Ghana Music Awards.

In 2024 he put out Lost Files, a ten-track album spanning hip-hop, highlife, and Afrobeats. Pulse Ghana covered the release, noting the album grew out of a setback in which Scrip T lost his original recordings and had to rebuild the project from scratch. That same year he recorded "Selfish" with Kuami Eugene. Adom Online reported the track received heavy airplay and led to stage appearances within Ghanaian communities across the UK.

His single "Am Ghostin'" was picked for the BBC Introducing East Midlands playlist, his first appearance on BBC radio.

=== Nursing and community work ===
Scrip T runs an OSCE (Objective Structured Clinical Examination) training programme for African nurses in the UK. Adom Online reported his third cohort passed at a 98% first-sitting rate. He has said: "Empowering others is not just a gesture; it's a responsibility."

== Discography ==
=== Albums ===
Year	Title	Notes
2024	Lost Files	10-track album

=== Extended plays ===
Year	Title	Notes
2024	Songs for Her	Debut EP

=== Selected singles ===
Year	Title	Notes
2018	"Gimme Joy"	Features Strongman Burner
2023	"Nobody (Speed Up)"	
2024	"Selfish"	Features Kuami Eugene
2024	"Selfish (Speed Up)"	Features Kuami Eugene
2025	"Am Ghostin'"	Featured on BBC Introducing East Midlands
2025	"Me Myself & I"	
2025	"Africans Take Over"	

== Awards and nominations ==
Year	Award	Category	Result
2019	Vodafone Ghana Music Awards	Unsung Artiste of the Year	Nominated
