= The Golden Boy (KiDi album) =

2021 Afropop album by Ghanaian artist KiDi

Studio album by Kidi
- Released: June 23, 2021
- Genre: Afrobeats
- Length: 36:30
- Label: Lynx Entertainment

The Golden Boy is the second studio album by Ghanaian singer and songwriter Kidi. It was released on June 23, 2021, under Lynx Entertainment and distributed by MadeInENY, a subsidiary of Empire Distribution.

== Tracklist ==
The album consists of thirteen tracks. The track listing is as follows:

1. Golden Boy (Intro)
2. Birthday Riddim
3. Touch It
4. Magic
5. Cyclone
6. Dangerous
7. Send Me Nudes
8. Mon Bebe
9. So Fine
10. Spiritual (featuring Kuami Eugene and Patoranking)
11. Like A Rockstar
12. Ping Pong
13. Bad Things

== Awards ==
- Album of the Year - Ghana Music Awards 2022
