= MzGee =

Ghanaian media personality

Gloria Akpene Nyarku
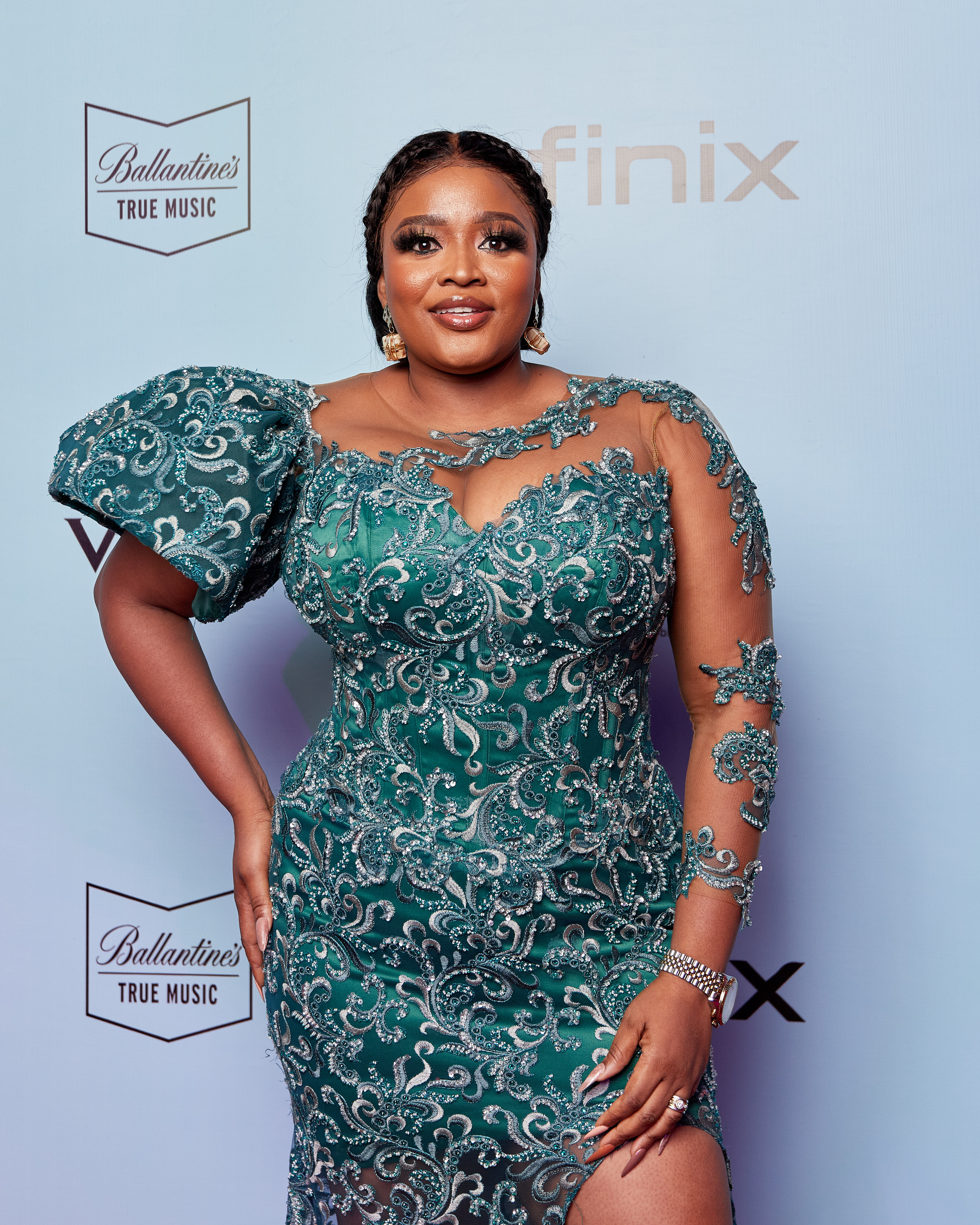
- Born: Gloria Akpene Nyarku
- Occupations: Radio and TV Personality
- Years active: 2005–present

Gloria Akpene Nyarku (commonly known as MzGee) is a Ghanaian media personality, journalist and broadcaster. She was formerly at Multimedia Group and previously hosted shows such as Mentor and ShowBuzz on TV3 and 3FM under Media General. In 2019, she was claimed to be the first and only female member on the 3Music Awards Board. In March 2021, she was among the Top 30 Most Influential Women in Music by the 3Music Awards Women's Brunch.

== Career and education ==
She began her media career in 2005 at Eagle FM at CCTU. In 2008, she later moved to Skyy TV and Pravda radio. She contested in a reality program on TV3 called Hottest Host during her national service days. She did her internship at TV3 before continuing her education at GIMPA. She joined Multimedia in 2014 and was a panelist and later hosted the Campus Show and Day Break on Hitz FM. In 2018, she launched a TV show called Gee Spot on Joy Prime and was attended by MzVee, KiDi, Ben Brako among others.

In November 2019, she left Multimedia and joined the Media General where she is currently the host of ShowBuzz and also a presenter and producer on TV3 and 3FM.

She is claimed to have covered many programs such as the Ghana Music Awards and the African Movie Academy Awards.

After two-years stint with Media General, the parent company of TV3 announced MzGee's resignation in a press statement released on October 15, 2021.

== Awards ==
- TV Entertainment Presenter of the Year, Ghana Arts and Entertainment Awards 2020.

== Personal life ==
She was married to Raymond Acquah in October 2017. The couple used to be co-workers at Multimedia Group. In 2025, MzGee announced on social media that they got divorced two years ago and asked to be referred to as Gloria Akpene Nyarku instead of Gloria Akpene Nayku-Acquah.

== Controversy ==
In July 2020, she interviewed a lawyer called Maurice Ampaw over allegations he said concerning Castro's family. The lawyer described her questions as 'foolish' and later threatened to take her on.
