= Sarkcess Music =

Ghanaian independent record label

- Founded: 2014
- Founder: Sarkodie
- Status: Active
- Genre: Various (Hip-hop, Hiplife, Afrobeats)
- Country of origin: Ghana
- Location: Accra

Sarkcess Music is a Ghanaian independent record label founded in 2014 by rapper and entrepreneur Sarkodie. According to published sources, the label has signed acts such as Akwaboah in 2016.

== History ==
Sarkodie launched the label in 2014. In March 2016 the label announced the signing of singer Akwaboah. In April 2019, rapper Strongman left the label following the expiration of his contract.

== Operations and roster ==
The label is based in Accra, Ghana, and has released albums and singles by Sarkodie and other artists under its imprint. It has been cited in academic work on Ghana’s music industry as one of the Ghanaian labels engaged in hip-hop and hiplife production. In 2023 the founder stated that he still pays artists who left the label, noting ongoing royalty arrangements.
