= Music of Ghana =

There are many styles of traditional and modern music of Ghana. The best known modern genre originating in Ghana is Highlife. For many years, Highlife was the preferred music genre until the introduction of Hiplife and many others.

== Traditional music ==
The traditional musicology of Ghana may be divided geographically between the open and vast savanna area of northern Ghana inhabited by Ghanaians of Gur and Mande speaking groups and the southern forested and coastal areas, inhabited by Ghanaians speaking Kwa languages such as Akan.

- The northern musical traditions belong to the wider Sahelian musical traditions. It features a mix of melodic composition on stringed instruments such as the kologo lute and the gonjey fiddle, wind instruments such as flutes and horns, and voice; with polyrhythms clapped or played on the talking drum, gourd drums or brekete bass drums. The tradition of gyil music (balafon) is also common, especially in northwestern Ghana around Wa and Lawra. Music in the northern styles is mostly set to a minor pentatonic or chromatic scale and melisma plays an important part in melodic and vocal styles. There is a long history of either griot or praise-singing traditions.
- The music of the coast is associated with social functions, and relies on complex polyrhythmic patterns played with drums and bells as well as harmonized song. Drums and dance are often linked, and the tradition of royal talking drums fontomfrom (distinct from the northern talking drum) means music is widely used for communication of both tangible and esoteric topics. The most well known of southern Ghanaian drum traditions is the kete and adowa drum and bell ensembles. Music can also be linked to traditional religions. An exception to this rule is the Akan tradition of singing with the Seperewa harp-lute which had its origins in the stringed harps of the north and west.

== Gold Coast period ==
During the Gold Coast era, the area was a hotbed of musical syncretism. Rhythms especially from gombe and ashiko, guitar-styles such as mainline and osibisaba, European brass bands and sea shanties, were all combined into a melting pot that became high-life.

== Mid-20th century and the invention of Ghanaian pop ==
Ghana became an independent nation in 1957. The music of Ghana often reflects a Caribbean influence, yet it still retains a flavour on its own. While pan-Ghanaian music had been developed for some time, the middle of the 20th century saw the development of distinctly Ghanaian pop music. High-life incorporated elements of swing, jazz, rock, ska and soukous. To a much lesser extent, Ghanaian musicians found success in the United States and, briefly, the United Kingdom with the surprise success of Osibisa's Afro-rock in the 1970s.

=== Guitar-bands in the 1930s, 1940s, 1950s and 1960s ===
In the 1930s, Sam's Trio, led by Jacob Sam (Kwame Asare), was the most influential of the high-life guitar-bands. Their "Yaa Amponsah", three versions of which were recorded in 1928 for Zonophone, was a major hit that remains a popular staple of numerous high-life bands. The next major guitar-band leader was E. K. Nyame, who sang in Twi. Nyame also added the double bass and more elements of the Western hemisphere, including jazz and Cuban music on the recommendation of his producer and manager E. Newman-Adjiri. In the 1960s, dance high-life was more popular than guitar-band high-life; most of the guitar bands began using the electric guitar until a roots revival in the mid-1970s.

=== Dance high-life in the 1930s, 1940s, 1950s and 1960s ===
Dance highlife evolved during World War II, when American jazz and swing became popular with the arrival of servicemen from the United States and United Kingdom. After independence in 1957, the socialist government began encouraging folk music, but highlife remained popular and influences from Trinidadian music. E. T. Mensah was the most influential musician of this period, and his band The Tempos frequently accompanied the president. The original bandleader of The Tempos was Guy Warren, who was responsible for introducing Caribbean music to Ghana and, later, was known for a series of innovative fusions of African rhythms and American jazz. Ebo Taylor, King Bruce, Jerry Hansen (musician) and Stan Plange also led influential dance bands during the 1950s and 1960s. By the 1970s, however, pop music from Europe and the US dominated the Ghanaian scene until a mid-1970s roots revival.

=== 1970s: Head revival ===
By the beginning of the 1970s, traditionally styled highlife had been overtaken by electric guitar bands and pop-dance music. Since 1966 and the fall of President Kwame Nkrumah, many Ghanaian musicians moved abroad, settling in the US, and UK. High-life bands arose like Sammy Kofi's (also known as Kofi Sammy). In 1971, the Soul to Soul music festival was held in Accra. Several legendary American musicians played, including Wilson Pickett, Ike and Tina Turner and Carlos Santana. With the exception of Mexican-American Santana, these American superstars were all black, and their presence in Accra was seen as legitimizing Ghanaian music. Though the concert is now mostly remembered for its role as a catalyst in the subsequent Ghanaian roots revival, it also led to increased popularity for American rock and soul. Inspired by the American musicians, new guitar bands arose in Ghana, including Nana Ampadu & the African Brothers, The City Boys and others. Musicians such as C. K. Mann, Daniel Amponsah and Eddie Donkor incorporated new elements, especially from Jamaican reggae. A group called Wulomei also arose in the 1970s, leading a cultural revival to encourage Ghanaian youths to support their own countryman's music. By the 1980s, the UK was experiencing a boom in African music as Ghanaian and others moved there in large numbers. The group Hi-Life International was probably the most influential band of the period, and others included Jon K, Dade Krama, Orchestra Jazira and Ben Brako. In the middle of the decade, however, British immigration laws changed, and the focus of Ghanaian emigration moved to Germany.

The Ghanaian-German community created a form of highlife called Burger-highlife. The most influential early burgher highlife musician was George Darko, whose "Akoo Te Brofo" coined the term and is considered the beginning of the genre. Burgher highlife was extremely popular in Ghana, especially after computer-generated dance beats were added to the mix. The same period saw a Ghanaian community appear in Toronto and elsewhere in Canada. Pat Thomas is probably the most famous Ghanaian-Canadian musician. Other emigres include Ghanaian-American Obo Addy, the Ghanaian-Swiss Andy Vans and the Ghanaian-Dutch Kumbi Salleh. In Ghana itself during the 1980s, reggae became extremely popular.

=== Hip-life ===
By the late 1990s, a new generation of artists created a new genre of music called Hiplife. The creator of this style is Reggie Rockstone, a Ghanaian musician who dabbled with hip-hop in the United States before finding his unique style. Hiplife basically was hiphop in the Ghanaian local dialect mixed with elements of the traditional High-life. Ace music producer Hammer of The Last Two unveiled artistes including Obrafour, Tinny and Ex-doe who further popularized the Hiplife music genre respectively. Hiplife has since proliferated and spawned stars such as Reggie Rockstone, Sherifa Gunu, Ayigbe Edem, Samini and Sarkodie. Producers responsible for steering this genre to what it is today were Hammer of The Last Two, Ball J, EL and Jupitar Dancehall Artiste.

== Hip hop ==
Ghanaian hip hop is a subculture and art movement which developed in Ghana during the late 1990s. The hiphop genre came into existence in Ghana through Reggie Rockstone, who is known as the hiplife father and other notable musicians such as Jayso and Ball J. It first came to Ghana as Hiplife where Reggie Rockstone introduced a fusion of hiphop beats with African sounds to create a whole new genre known as Gh hiphop.

== Afro beats ==
In the late 2000s, a new generation of artists introduced the Afrobeats genre into the Ghana music scene which is mostly referred to as Afro-pop. 4x4 and Fuse ODG among others popularized it and it has become part of the Ghanaian music culture.

== Marches ==
The Twelfth of July is an annual main parade of the Orange Order celebrated by the Grand Lodge of Ghana.

Ghana Armed Forces Central Band, are a marching band, which performs at state functions and represents Ghana internationally. Marching bands also include various school and cadet bands, such as the KNUST Regimental Band.

== See also ==
- Gh hiphop
- Ghanaian hip hop
- Azonto
- List of record labels in Ghana
- Rhythm in Sub-Saharan Africa
- Sub-Saharan African music traditions
