= Shata =

Shata may refer to:

== Places ==
- Shata, Egypt, a city in Damietta Governorate, Egypt

== People ==
=== Last name ===
- Mamman Shata (1923–1999), Nigerian singer
- Mohammed Shata (born 1950), Nigerian politician
- Pnina Tamano-Shata (born 1981), Israeli lawyer, journalist and politician

== See also ==
- Shatta
