= KiDi =

Ghanaian singer-songwriter

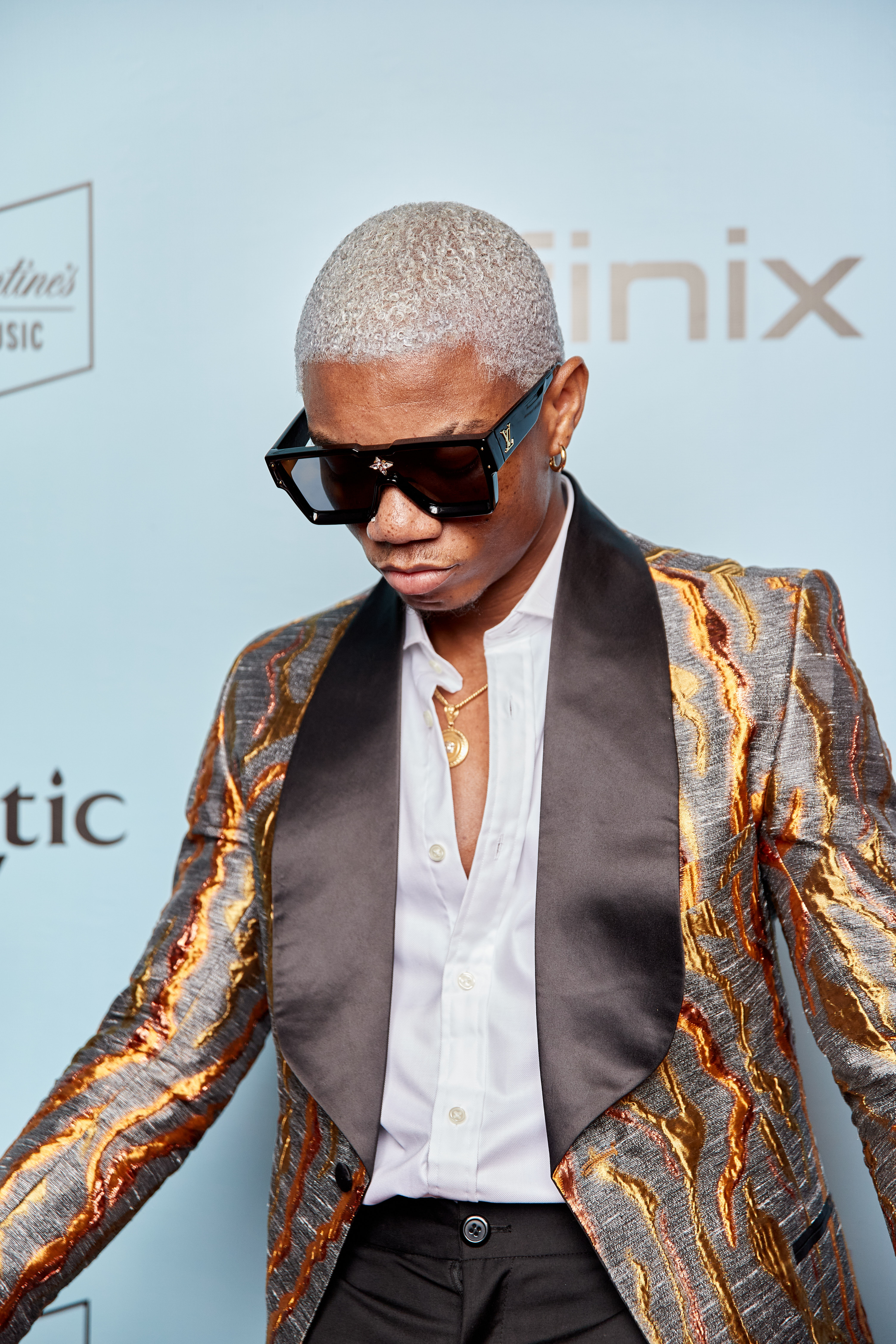
- KiDi at 3 Music Awards

Background information
- Also known as: Sugar Daddy, Golden Boy, and Gyal dem Sugar
- Born: Dennis Nana Dwamena; 18 August 1993 (age 33); Accra, Ghana
- Genres: Afrobeats, Afro pop, highlife
- Occupations: Singer, songwriter, producer
- Instruments: Piano, guitar
- Years active: 2016–present
- Label: Lynx Entertainment Empire Distribution
- Website: Lynx Entertainment Website (Official)

KiDi (born 18 August 1993), known in real life as Dennis Nana Kwaku Boadi Dwamena, is a Ghanaian singer, songwriter, and producer.

== Early beginnings and breakthrough ==
While studying Economics and Information Studies at the University of Ghana, KiDi's love for music led him to perform on Moonlight Café – a music production that supports upcoming artists and gives them a platform to display their talents on University Campuses in Ghana. He also recorded covers of popular songs.

In 2015, KiDi joined the MTN Hitmaker competition. He went on to win the competition and was later signed to Lynx Entertainment. KiDi shot to prominence in 2017 when he released "Say You Love Me" a song he not only composed but also arranged and produced. KiDi established himself as one of the fastest-rising stars in Ghana when he released yet another chart-topper titled "Odo" in July 2017, the remix with Nigerian artist Davido and Mayorkun in December 2017, and Adiepena in April 2018.

== Artistry ==
KiDi has mounted several stages including 2017 Rapperholic Concert, Ghana Music Honors 2017 Edition, December to Remember 2017, S Concert 2017, the 61st Ghana Independence Celebration Show in March 2018 at the Indigo 02 in London. He has performed on the same stage as many award-winning African artists including Sarkodie, Samini, Shatta Wale, MzVee, WizKid, Tiwa Savage, Efya, and Patoranking.KiDi has also produced several tracks for other artists and co-produced with award-winning Ghanaian producer, Richie Mensah. He has also written for Ghanaian acts including the award-winning MzVee and Adina and has collaborated with artists such as Tic tac, Ko-Jo Cue, Magnom and Kwesi Arthur. KiDi received 6 nominations at the 2018 Vodafone Ghana Music Awards including ‘Best New Artiste’, ‘Afro-pop Song of the Year’ and ‘Male Vocalist of the Year’ and went on to win the award for ‘High-life Song of the Year’ at the awards in April 2018. He was crowned as the Artiste of the 5th Edition of the 3Music award and TGMA 2022. KiDi currently has 2 studio albums and 2 EPs. His debut album, Sugar was released on 31 May 2019. He also released a movie the same year with the album name (Sugar) in Accra, Kumasi, and the UK.

KiDi released the Blue EP in 2020 as a build-up to the release of his second studio album, The Golden Boy. The Blue EP featured tracks such as "End in Tears", "Say Cheese" and One Man which featured Adina.

In 2021, KiDi released his second studio album, The Golden Boy which won the "Album of the Year Award" at the 2021 Vodafone Ghana Music Awards. It included hits like "Mon Bebe", "Cyclone" and Touch It, which broke the record for the most streamed Ghanaian song on Spotify.On 24 August 2026, KiDi unveiled the tracklist for his 15-track album Where Do We Go From Here, scheduled for release on 27 August 2026. The album includes collaborations with Sarkodie on "IDK", Lasmid on "Signature", AratheJay on "Lonely" and Kwesi Arthur on "Crucified", alongside previously teased singles "Babylon" and "Signature".https://ghanaweekend.com/2025/08/25/kidi-unveils-15-track-album-where-do-we-go-from-here/

== Personal life ==
=== Education ===
He attended St. Anthony's School in Accra for his primary education, where he excelled academically. He then continued his secondary education at Accra Academy. After completing high school, Dennis was accepted into the University of Ghana, Legon, to pursue a degree in Economics and Information Studies. In 2016, the singer graduated.

KiDi is from Kwahu Abetifi.

KiDi has a son called Zane.

== Awards and nominations ==
Year	Organization	Award	Work	Result	Ref.
2017	4syte Music Video Awards	Best Discovery Video	Ɔdɔ	Nominated	
2018	Ghana Music Awards	Highlife Song of the Year	Ɔdɔ	Won	
2018	Ghana Music Awards	Afropop Song of the Year	Say You Love Me	Nominated	
2018	Ghana Music Awards	Highlife Artiste of the Year	Himself	Nominated	
2018	Ghana Music Awards	Best Male Vocalist	Ɔdɔ	Nominated	
2018	Ghana Music Awards	Best New Artiste	Himself	Nominated	
2018	Ghana Music Awards	Song of the Year	Ɔdɔ	Nominated	
2018	Ghana Music Awards (UK)	Artist of the Year	Himself	Nominated	
2018	Ghana Music Awards (UK)	Highlife Artist of the Year	Himself	Nominated	
2018	Ghana Music Awards (UK)	Best Male Vocalist	Ɔdɔ	Nominated	
2018	Ghana Music Awards (UK)	Highlife Song of the Year	Himself	Nominated	
2018	Ghana Music Awards (UK)	Best New Artist of the Year	Himself	Nominated	
2018	3Music Awards	Male Act of the Year	Himself	Nominated	
2018	3Music Awards	Breakout Act of the Year	Himself	Nominated	
2018	3Music Awards	Song of the Year	Ɔdɔ	Nominated	
2018	3Music Awards	Most eventful Snapchat channel	Himself	Won	
2018	AFRIMA	Best Artiste Duo or Group in Africa Contemporary	Himself	Won	
2019	Ghana Music Awards	Highlife Artist of the Year	Himself	Nominated	
2019	Ghana Music Awards	Best Male Vocalist	Himself	Won	
2019	Ghana Music Awards	Song of the Year	Thunder	Nominated	
2019	Ghana Music Awards	Highlife Song of the Year	Thunder	Nominated	
2019	3Music Awards	Best Male Vocal Performance	Fakyɛ Me (meaning-Forgive Me)	Won	
2019	3Music Awards (UK)	Highlife Act of the Year	Himself	Nominated	
2019	3Music Awards (UK)	Album	Sugar	Nominated	
2019	4syte TV Music Video Awards	Best Edited Video	Cinderella	Nominated	
2019	4syte TV Music Video Awards	Best Male	Adiepɛna	Nominated	
2019	4syte TV Music Video Awards	Best Highlife	Adiepɛna	Nominated	
2019	4syte TV Music Video Awards	Best Collaboration	Mr. Badman	Nominated	
2020	Ghana Music Awards	Highlife Artist of the Year	Himself	Nominated	
2020	Ghana Music Awards	Afrobeats Song of the Year	Mr Badman	Nominated	
2020	Ghana Music Awards	Male Vocalist of the Year	Himself	Nominated	
2020	Ghana Music Awards	Best Collaboration of the Year	Ɔhemaa (with Kuami Eugene)	Nominated	
2020	Ghana Music Awards	Best Collaboration of the Year	Mr Badman (ft Kwesi Arthur)	Nominated	
2020	Ghana Music Awards	Album of the Year	Sugar	Won	
2020	Ghana Music Awards	International Collaboration of the Year	Cinderella (ft Mayorkun & Peruzzi)	Nominated	
2020	Ghana Music Awards	International Collaboration of the Year	Sugar Daddy (ft Mr Eazi)	Nominated	
2020	Ghana Music Awards	Most Popular Song of the Year	Mr Badman	Nominated	
2021	3Music Awards	Artist of the Year	Himself	Won	
2021	3Music Awards	EP of the Year	BLUE	Won	
2021	3Music Awards	Song of the Year	Enjoyment	Won	
2021	3Music Awards	Afro Beat Song of the Year	Enjoyment	Won	
2021	Vodafone Ghana Music Awards	Artiste of the Year	Himself	Nominated	
2021	Vodafone Ghana Music Awards	Afrobeat/Afropop Song of the Year	"Say Cheese"	Won	
2021	Vodafone Ghana Music Awards	Most Popular Song of the Year	"Say Cheese"	Nominated	
2021	Vodafone Ghana Music Awards	Most Popular Song of the Year	"Enjoyment"	Nominated	
2021	Vodafone Ghana Music Awards	Afrobeat/Afropop Artist of the Year	Himself	Won	
2021	Vodafone Ghana Music Awards	EP of the Year	"Blue"	Won	
2021	Vodafone Ghana Music Awards	Collaboration of the Year	"One Man" (ft Adina)	Nominated	
2021	Vodafone Ghana Music Awards	Best Male Vocal Performance	Himself	Nominated	
2021	Vodafone Ghana Music Awards	Best Highlife Song	"Enjoyment"	Won	
2022	The Headies Awards	Best West African Artiste of the Year	KiDi	Nominated	
2022	Vodafone Ghana Music Awards	Artiste of the Year	Himself	Won	
2022	Vodafone Ghana Music Awards	Album of the Year	The Golden Boy	Won	
2022	Vodafone Ghana Music Awards	Video of the Year	Mon Bebe	Won	
2022	Vodafone Ghana Music Awards	Afrobeats/AfroPop Artiste	Himself	Won	
2022	Vodafone Ghana Music Awards	Best Reggae/Dancehall Song of the Year	Touch It	Won	
2022	Vodafone Ghana Music Awards	Most Popular Song of the Year	Touch It	Won	
2022	Vodafone Ghana Music Awards	International Collaboration of the Year	Spiritual ft. Kuami Eugene, Patoranking	Nominated	
2022	Vodafone Ghana Music Awards	Best Male Vocal Performance	Bad Things	Nominated	
2022	Vodafone Ghana Music Awards	Best Afrobeats Song	Mon Bebe	Nominated	
2024		Collaboration of the year	"Liquor" – KiDi ft. Stonebwoy	Won	
2024	3Music Awards	Afrobeats/Afro Pop Song of the Year	"Likor"	Nominated	
2024	3Music Awards	Best Collaboration of the Year	"Likor"	Won	
2024	3Music Awards	Song of the Year	"Likor"	Nominated	
2024	3Music Awards	Afrobeats/Afro Pop Act of the Year	Himself	Nominated	
2024	3Music Awards	Best Male Vocal Performance	"I Lied"	Won	
2024	Ghana Music Awards UK	Most Popular Song of the Year	"Likor"	Nominated	
2024	Ghana Music Awards UK	Best Collaboration of the Year	"Likor"	Won	
2024	Ghana Music Awards UK	Best Collaboration of the Year	"Bambalika"	Nominated	
2024	Ghana Music Awards UK	Male Vocalist of the Year	"I Lied"	Nominated	
2024	Ghana Music Awards UK	Best Afropop Song of the Year	"I Lied"	Nominated	
2024	Ghana Music Awards UK	Best Afrobeats Song of the Year	"Likor"	Nominated	
