= Black Avenue Music =

Ghanaian independent record label

- Founded: 2009
- Founder: D-Black
- Status: Active
- Genre: Various (Hip hop, Hiplife, Afrobeats)
- Country of origin: Ghana
- Location: Accra

Black Avenue Music is a Ghanaian independent record label and entertainment imprint founded in 2009 by musician-entrepreneur D-Black (Desmond Kwesi Blackmore). The label operates from Accra and has been active in artist development, music production and release activities.

== History ==
The label was established in 2009 by D-Black. Over time, Black Avenue Music signed a number of artists including DJs and producers, and in 2018 the imprint was awarded Best Record Label at the Ghana-Naija Showbiz Awards. In December 2024 it was reported that artist S3fa (also known as Sefadzi Abena Amesu) officially exited Black Avenue Music after six years with the label.

== Operations and impact ==
Black Avenue Music has released music spanning genres such as hip hop, hiplife and afrobeats, and has been involved in both local Ghanaian markets and broader West African audiences. The label celebrated its 15-year anniversary in September 2024, marking what it described as “fifteen years of excellence” in Ghana’s music industry.
