= MzVee =

Ghanaian Dancehall musician

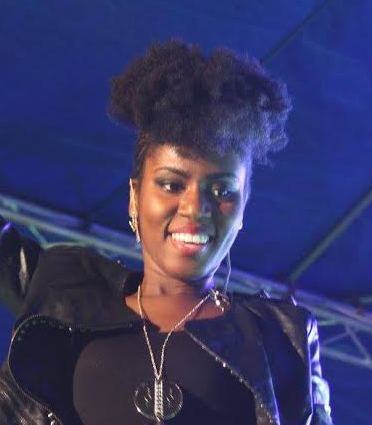
- MzVee

Background information
- Born: Vera Hamenoo-Kpeda; 23 June 1992 (age 34); Accra, Ghana
- Genres: Afro pop, hiplife, R&B, dancehall
- Occupation: Singer
- Years active: 2012–present
- Website: mzveegh.com

Vera Hamenoo-Kpeda (born 23rd June 1992), better known as MzVee, is a Ghanaian singer and songwriter. Her debut solo album features several hit singles including 'Borkor Borkor (meaning – Slowly), 'Natural Girl' and 'Dancehall Queen'. MzVee was signed to the record label Lynx Entertainment and was the winner of the New Artiste of the Year award at the 2015 Ghana Music Awards. She parted ways with lynx Entertainment in the year 2019. She is currently a solo artist.

== Early life ==
MzVee was born in South La Estates, Accra to Ernest Hamenoo-Kpeda, a businessman, and Florence Hamenoo-Kpeda, a caterer. She hails from Keta in the Volta Region of Ghana. She has two older sisters and a brother and attended St Martin de Porres School in Dansoman, Accra in her early years. She moved on to St. Mary's Girls' Senior High School where she studied Home economics. She was studying Business administration at Ghana Telecom University, later in 2016, she abandoned school.

== Music career ==
=== 2012 – 2013: Early beginnings ===
MzVee first burst onto the Ghanaian music scene in the summer of 2012 as the lead singer of Lynx Entertainment's girl band D3. The band had popular hits like "Good Girls Gone Bad" and "Gyani Gyani" before disbanding at the end of 2013 due to the young members' educational commitments.

=== 2014 – 2016: Breakthrough ===
MzVee launched her solo career with debut single ‘Borkor Borkor’ released in January 2014. She followed this with hit single ‘Natural Girl’ and went on to win the 'Unsung Artiste Award' at the 2014 Ghana Music Awards. Her debut album was released in November 2014 and features collaborations with several award-winning artistes such as Stonebwoy, VIP, Shatta Wale, Richie Mensah, M.anifest and Didier Awadi.

Following the success of her award-winning debut album, MzVee released her second album titled Verified in November 2015 to rave reviews. The album has earned MzVee 7 nominations at the 2016 Ghana Music Awards including 'Album of the Year' and 'Record of the Year' for the single 'Abofra' which features Efya. Her highly anticipated third album DaaVee was released in May 2017.

=== 2017– 2019: Hiatus ===
MzVee took a two-year break from the Music Industry from 2017 to 2019. In an interview with TV3 on Monday, 5 January 2020, she revealed that her reason for leaving the music industry was a massive depression which she was going through. This has dismissed pregnancy rumors that some people were saying is the reason for her absence from the Music Industry. Throughout the two-year period MzVee found help from her friend Efya who kept supporting and encouraging her until she overcame depression. She has announced that as of 2020 she is back to music and will be releasing a single she has titled "Sheriff".

=== 2020 – 2021: inVeencible ===
One other thing MzVee said when she returned from her depression-induced hiatus from music was that she will be releasing two albums. However, she obviously could not release the two albums as she promised due to the COVID-19 pandemic.

She rather managed to release one album dubbed inVeencible. The album which featured Sarkodie, Mugeez, Efya, Medikal, Kelvyn Boy, Kojo Funds, as well as Falz and Navy Kenzoo, was released on 11 December 2020. In March 2021, she partnered with TRACE TV to release her music video for her song 'You Alone'.

=== 2022: 10 Thirty ===
On 24 June 2022, MzVee released her fifth album, titled 10 Thirty inspired by her 10th year as a musician and to celebrate turning 30 years. 10 Thirty, a ten–tracked album featured Nigerian musicians, Bella Shmurda, Yemi Alade, Tiwa Savage and Ghanaian musicians Stonebwoy and Kofi Kinaata.

== Musical style and recognition ==
MzVee being interviewed at the 2017 Wave Concert

MzVee's music contains elements of afropop, R&B and dancehall and her strong vocal abilities earned her a nomination for 'Female Vocalist of the Year' at the 2015 Ghana Music Awards and the award for 'Most Promising Act' at the 2015 Ghana Music Honors. She is regarded as one of the stars of Ghana's dancehall scene and received the award for 'Best Female Vocalist of the Year' at the 2015 Ghanaian dancehall awards, BASS awards. Her trademark natural African hair and hit single ‘Natural Girl’ has made her an inspiration to young girls across Africa who want to celebrate their natural look.

MzVee was nominated for the BET Awards 2015, in the 'Best International New Artist' category.

In October 2015, MzVee was appointed the World Bank Ambassador for their 'End Extreme Poverty Campaign'. She released the official campaign song titled 'End Poverty' and became a World Bank #Music4Dev Guest Artist; a role which has been held in the past by a number of award-winning artists including D'Banj and Fally Ipupa.

MzVee was named in MTV Base's list of the top African artists to watch out for in 2016. This list featured the breakthrough hit makers of 2015 on the African continent. She has also been nominated in the ‘Best Urban Artist’ category at the 2016 KORA Music Awards and received 7 nominations at the 2016 Ghana Music Awards including Songwriter of the Year with Richie Mensah and Efya, Album of the Year and Best Female Vocalist.

On 20th May 2016, MzVee was nominated for the BET Awards 2016 – Best International Act: Africa category and became the first Ghanaian female musician to be nominated for a major BET Award. She was also nominated in the Best Female category in October 2016 for the MTV Africa Music Awards.

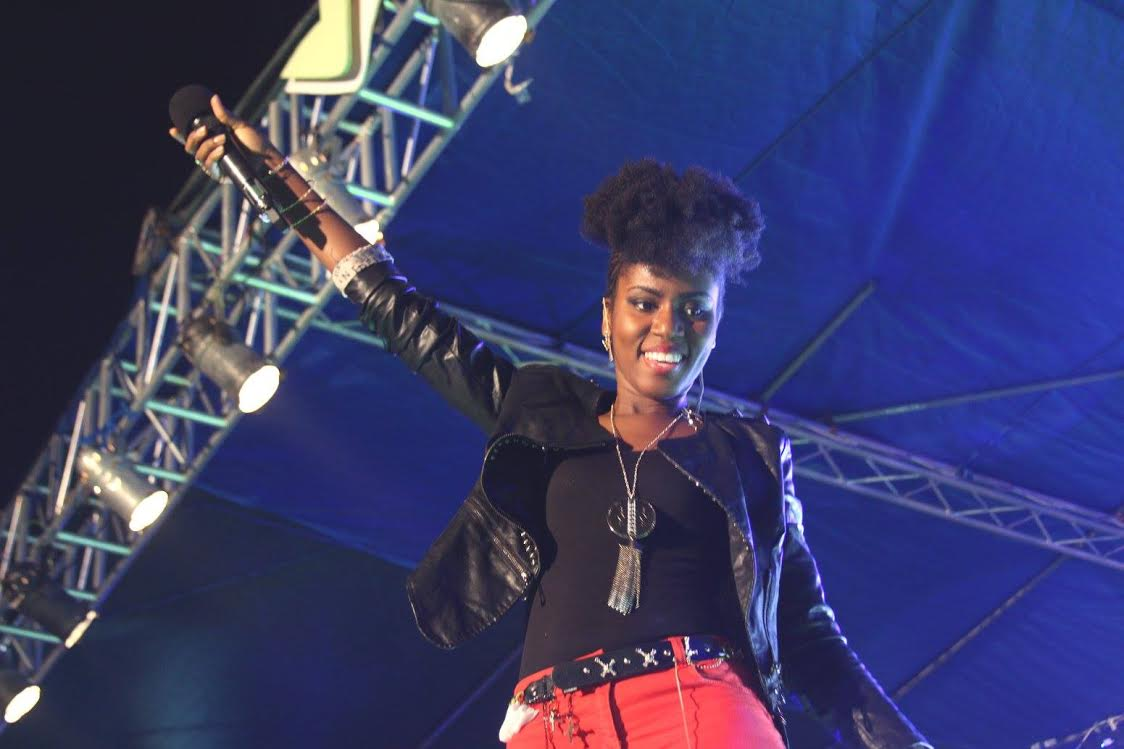
MzVee singing at a concert

MzVee continues to receive both critical and commercial acclaim for her work and was awarded the Best Female Artist Honour at the Ghana Music Honours on 4 March 2017. She was also nominated for Reggae/Dancehall Artiste of the Year, Best Female Vocalist and Overall Artiste of the Year at the 2017 Ghana Music Awards. She is the first Ghanaian musician to be featured on the Grammy's 'Press play at home' platform.

====== ===Album=== ======
- POM (2024)
- Re-Vee-Lation (2014)
- Verified (2015)
- DaaVee (2017)
- InVeecible (2020)
- 10 Thirty (2022)

== Controversies ==
=== Ebony Reigns ===
In 2017 when MzVee went silent for a while after the release of her “Daavi” album, that same year the late Ebony Reigns became very hot which made some social media nitizens claim MzVee’s career has been ended in the heat of Ebony Reigns. But in an interview MzVee debunks every single claim about her career being dead due to the reign of Ebony and gives reasons as to why she was on a low at the time Ebony rose with hits after hits.

=== Zee TM ===
In 2020, Zee TM a Ghanaian music group accused singer MzVee of using a beat that belonged to them without seeking their consent. Adekid, a member of the Zee TM group in an interview with MzGee on 3FM expressed surprise on how an A-List brand like MzVee would use their beat without doing the needful.

== Awards and nominations ==
Year	Organization	Award	Work	Result
2014	Ghana Music Awards	Unsung Artiste of the Year	Herself	Won
2014	4syte Music Video Awards	Best Discovery	Herself	Won
2015	Bass Awards	Best Female Vocal Artist	Herself	Won
2015	Ghana Music Honors	Most Promising Act	Herself	Won
2015	Ghana Music Awards	Artiste of the Year	Herself	Nominated
2015	Ghana Music Awards	Reggae/Dancehall Artiste of the Year	Herself	Nominated
2015	Ghana Music Awards	Best New Artiste of the Year	Herself	Won
2015	Ghana Music Awards	Album of the Year	Re-Vee-Lation	Nominated
2015	Ghana Music Awards	Reggae Dancehall Song of the Year	Natural Girl	Nominated
2015	Ghana Music Awards	Best Female Vocal Performance	My Everything	Nominated
2015	BET Awards	Best New International Artist	Herself	Nominated
2016	KORA Music Awards	Best Urban Artist	Hold Me Now	Nominated
2016	Ghana Music Awards	Album of the Year	Verified	Nominated
2016	Ghana Music Awards	Songwriter of the Year	MzVee, Richie Mensah and Efya	Nominated
2016	Ghana Music Awards	Best Female Vocalist of the Year	Hold Me Now	Won
2016	Ghana Music Awards	Reggae Song of the Year	Hold Me Now	Nominated
2016	Ghana Music Awards	Afro Pop Song of the Year	Abofra	Nominated
2016	Ghana Music Awards	Record of the Year	Abofra	Nominated
2016	Ghana Music Awards	Reggae/Dancehall Artist of the Year	Herself	Nominated
2016	BET Awards	Best International Act Africa	Herself	Nominated
2016	Nigerian Entertainment Awards	African Female Artist (Non-Nigerian)	Herself	Nominated
2016	AFRIMMA	Best Female West Africa	Herself	Nominated
2016	MTV Africa Music Awards	Best Female	Herself	Nominated
2017	Ghana Music Honours	Reggae/Dancehall Artist Honour	Herself	Nominated
2017	Ghana Music Honours	Best Female Artist Honour	Herself	Won
2017	Ghana Music Honours	People's Choice Artist Honour	Herself	Nominated
2017	Ghana Music Awards	Reggae/Dancehall Artiste of the Year	Herself	Nominated
2017	Ghana Music Awards	Best Female Vocalist	Nobody Else	Nominated
2017	Ghana Music Awards	Overall Artiste of the Year	Herself	Nominated
2017	4syte Music Video Awards	Best Female Video	Rewind	Nominated
2017	4syte Music Video Awards	Best Choreography Video	Rewind	Nominated
2017	BASS Awards	Artiste of the Year	Herself	Nominated
2017	BASS Awards	Reggae Song of the Year	Nobody Else	Nominated
2017	BASS Awards	Performer of the Year	Herself	Nominated
2017	BASS Awards	Female Vocalist of the Year	Nobody Else	Nominated
2017	BASS Awards	Reggae Collaboration of the Year	Nobody Else (feat. Black Prophet)	Won
2017	BASS Awards	Dancehall Artiste of the Year	Herself	Nominated
2017	BASS Awards	Reggae Video of the Year	Nobody Else	Nominated
2018	Ghana Music Awards	Female Vocalist of the Year	Herself	Nominated
2018	Ghana Music Awards	Reggae/Dancehall Artiste	Herself	Nominated
2018	Ghana Music Awards	Reggae/Dancehall Song of the Year	Rewind	Nominated
2018	Ghana Music Awards	Collaboration of the Year	Sing My Name (feat. Patoranking)	Nominated
2018	Ghana Music Awards	Afropop Song of the Year	Sing My Name (feat. Patoranking)	Nominated
2018	Ghana Music Awards	Album of the Year	Daa-Vee	Nominated
2019	Ghana Music Awards	Best Music Video of the Year	Come and see my Moda" ft Yemi Alade Directed by Xbills Ebenezer	Won
2021	Ghana Music Awards	Best Reggae Dancehall Song of the Year	Sheriff	Nominated
2021	Ghana Music Awards	Best Music Video of the Year	Baddest Boss	Won
2021	Ghana Music Awards	Album of the Year	Inveecible	Nominated
