= 2 Fine Music =

Ghanaian independent record label

- Founded: 2025
- Founder: RG Qluck Wise
- Status: Active
- Genre: Various
- Country of origin: Ghana
- Location: Accra

2 Fine Music is an independent Ghanaian record label founded in 2025 by musician RG Qluck Wise.

== History ==
In late 2025, RG Qluck Wise officially launched 2 Fine Music, signalling his transition from performer to label executive. The label is based in Accra, Ghana, and aims to support Ghanaian artists through production, distribution and artist‐development services.

In October 2025, the label released the single “My Love For You” by its founder RG Qluck Wise, which became available on all major music streaming platforms.

On 15 November 2025, 2 Fine Music released a new single titled “Oshedu” by RG Qluck Wise.
