= Shatta Movement Records =

Ghanaian independent record label

- Founded: 2013 (approx.)
- Founder: Shatta Wale
- Status: Active
- Genre: Reggae, Dancehall, Hiplife
- Country of origin: Ghana
- Location: Accra

Shatta Movement Records is a Ghanaian independent record label founded by Ghanaian dancehall artist Shatta Wale (real name Charles Nii Armah Mensah Jr).

== History ==
Shatta Wale began operating his own recording and release activities under the Shatta Movement brand following his re-emergence under that stage name in 2013. The label has been identified in trade listings as part of the broader Shatta Movement Empire, along with sister imprints such as SM 4 LYF.

In December 2015, the label Shatta Movement Records reportedly expressed interest in signing Ghanaian rapper Maccasio from Tamale to its roster.

== Operations and focus ==
The label is based in Accra, Ghana, and has released recordings by its founder. It operates in genres including dancehall, reggae and hiplife. The label has also issued public statements under its imprint, for example regarding controversies involving its founder.
