= Gringo (Shatta Wale song) =

Single by Shatta Wale
- Released: April 27, 2018
- Genre: Dancehall; reggae
- Length: 1:43
- Label: Zylofon Music
- Songwriter(s): Shatta Wale
- Producer(s): Da Maker

Shatta Wale singles chronology
"Taking Over" (2017)	"Gringo" (2018)	"Mama Stories" (2018)

Music video
- "Gringo" on YouTube

"Gringo" is a song recorded by reggae-dancehall singer Shatta Wale. It was released by Zylofon Music on April 27, 2018, together with its music video. The song was produced by Da Maker. In less than 48 hours after being released, the song reached number 4 on the US iTunes Top 100 reggae songs chart. It was also a number one song on Ghana's iTunes Singles Chart.

== Background ==
In January 2018, a snippet of the song went viral on social media. Wale is seen in a video dancing to the song while cruising in his car. Fans questioned him on his social media until he later confirmed it as a single from his album Reign, and that he would only release the song after he had finished shooting the video.

== Music video ==
Directed by Sesan Ogunro, a UK-based Nigerian video producer. The film is set in the 1880 and focuses on the character 'El Shatta', who is able to win the heart of Jasmine, the beautiful girlfriend of the corrupt sheriff known as Snake Eye. It was shot in the province of Blanco, Texas, at the Buggy Barn Museum and with over 20 professional actors.

== Critical reception ==
"Gringo" received positive reviews from music critics, with many praising Shatta Wale for releasing a dancehall song to maintain his commercial dominance. Olamide and other acts from Nigeria and Ghana praised Wale on Twitter, with some also performing their own rendition. In an interview, Wale elaborated on why he chose "Gringo" as the song title and the concept of the short film accompanying the audio: "it's a Mexican term meaning foreigner. People saw Shatta Wale as a foreigner. This is a stranger who came to conquer the music industry in Ghana and made history in dancehall music. I wanted to break barriers for everyone to know who Shatta Wale is."
