= Fadama, Central African Republic =

Fadama
- Location in Central African Republic
- Coordinates: 5°43′34″N 22°45′43″E
- Country: Central African Republic
- Prefecture: Mbomou
- Sub-prefecture: Bakouma
- Commune: Bakouma

Fadama is a village located 3 km from Bakouma in Mbomou Prefecture, Central African Republic.

== History ==
FPRC burned around 40 houses in Fadama when they retreated from Bakouma in January 2019. In September 2022, the villagers sought refuge in a nearby bush due to the rumor of an attack in Bakouma.

CPC invaded Fadama in April 2024, causing the residents to flee from the village. An armed group clashed with FACA in Fadama on 9 October 2024. The government forces killed two rebels and injured the others.

== Education ==
There is a school in the village.
