= After the Storm (Shatta Wale album) =

After The Storm

Studio album by Shatta Wale
- Released: April 29, 2016
- Recorded: 2015–2016
- Genres: Reggae, dancehall
- Length: 74:15
- Label: Shatta Movement Music Production

Shatta Wale chronology
| Cloud 9 (2017) | After The Storm (2016) | Shatta Wale (2017) |

Singles from After The Storm
- 1. "Reality" Released: April 20, 2015; 2. "Baby (Chop Kiss)" Released: August 18, 2015; 3. "Like A King" Released: December 29, 2015; 4. "Hol'It" Released: September 29, 2015; 5. "Kakai" Released: October 31, 2015

After The Storm is a studio album by Ghanaian reggae-dancehall singer Shatta Wale, released by Shatta Movement Music Production on April 29, 2016. Upon its release, it was made available for digital download. On 6 May 2016, the 22 songs, 1 hour and 18 minutes long album was made available for purchase on iTunes.

== Commercial performance ==
Following the release of the album, Shatta Wale announced he was going to go on a European tour but he later cancelled it and only performed at indigo, at The O2 in London on August 26. The 'After the Storm' US tour kicked off on July 1, 2017 in New York at the PlayStation Theater and Massachusetts at the Hanover Theater on July 8.

== Track listing ==
All tracks are written by Shatta Wale.

| No. | Title | Length |
|---|---|---|
| 1. | "Intro" | 3:54 |
| 2. | "For the Money" | 3:28 |
| 3. | "What You Want" | 2:59 |
| 4. | "Mahama Paper" | 3:55 |
| 5. | "Baby Chop Kiss" | 3:20 |
| 6. | "Kakai" | 3:38 |
| 7. | "Bie Gya (Open Fire)" | 3:15 |
| 8. | "If I Collect" | 3:12 |
| 9. | "Am OK" | 3:15 |
| 10. | "Reality" | 4:15 |
| 11. | "Chairman" | 2:29 |
| 12. | "Champion" | 4:19 |
| 13. | "Dancehall King" | 3:50 |
| 14. | "Lock the City" | 3:16 |
| 15. | "Hol'It" | 3:49 |
| 16. | "Money and Dancehall" | 3:04 |
| 17. | "Like a King" | 3:09 |
| 18. | "Kill Dem Wit Prayers" | 4:28 |
| 19. | "Tell Me a Lie" | 3:15 |
| 20. | "Ayele" | 3:33 |
| 21. | "Too Much Chemikal" | 4:21 |
| 22. | "Afta Di Storm" | 3:31 |
| Total length: | | 74:15 |

== Release history ==
| Region | Date | Format | Label |
|---|---|---|---|
| Ghana | 2016 | CD, Digital download | Shatta Movement Music Production |
