= Lynx Entertainment =

Ghanaian record label

- Founded: 2006
- Founder: Richie Mensah
- Genre: Hiplife, hip-hop, rap, R&B
- Country of origin: Ghana
- Location: Accra
- Official website: lynxghana.com

Lynx Entertainment is a Ghanaian record label founded in 2006 by the producer and singer-songwriter Richie Mensah.

== History ==
The label launched the solo careers of Ghanaian musicians Richie, ASEM, Irene Logan, OJ Blaq, Eazzy, Zigi, Jayla, MzVee, KiDi, Kuami Eugene and DopeNation. Lynx Entertainment has also produced hit singles for several Ghanaian artistes including Tinny, Okyeame Kwame, VIP, Praye, Bradez, Irene and Jane, Obour, Becca, Reggie Rockstone, Efya, Trigmatic, Sonni Balli, EL, Jael Wiafe, Rayoe, Edem and Iwan.

In 2010, the label's artistes Richie, ASEM, OJ Blaq, Eazzy and Zigi collaborated on "Africa's Moment", which appeared on Hello Afrika, Sony Music's release in conjunction with the 2010 FIFA World Cup in South Africa. The song was also used in the Vodafone advert which staged the first ever flashmob in West Africa.

Lynx Entertainment released Back 2 Zero in July 2011. The album has all of the artistes on the record label as well as renowned Ghanaian musicians such as Gyedu Blay-Ambolley, Tinny, V.I.P (group), Okyeame Kwame, Efya, Trigmatic, Sonniballi, EL, Jael Wiafe, Edem and Iwan. The album includes a remake of the Ghanaian folk song "Yen Ara Asase Ni" which was originally composed by Ephraim Amu. The remake has 11 of Ghana's top musicians and was adopted as a peace song before the 2012 general elections in Ghana.

The record label introduced a new girl band D3 to the Ghanaian music scene in summer 2012. The band, made up of three members aged 16, 19 and 20, released hit singles such as "Good Girls Gone Bad" and "Gyani Gyani". They split up at the end of 2013 because of educational commitments.

MzVee, the lead singer of the group, went on to launch a solo career under the management of Lynx Entertainment and quickly became a household name in Ghana. She won the Unsung Artiste Award at the 2014 Ghana Music Awards in May 2014, and released her first solo album, Reveelation, in November 2014. This was followed in November 2015 by her second album, Verified, and her third studio album, DaaVee, in May 2017.

Lynx Entertainment while in its career created afrobeats music like KiDi and Kuami Eugene, and is a leading record labels in Africa.

== Artistes ==
| Act | Year signed | Albums released under Lynx Entertainment |
|---|---|---|
| Richie | 2006 | 2 |
| ASEM | 2006 | 2 |
| OJ Blaq | 2006 | 1 |
| Irene Logan | 2007 | 1 |
| Eazzy | 2009 | 1 |
| Zigi | 2010 | 1 |
| MzVee | 2014 | 3 |
| KiDi | 2016 | 2 |
| Kuami Eugene | 2016 | 2 |
| DopeNation | 2019 | 0 |
| Adina | 2022 | 0 |
| Jayla | 2013 | 0 |

== Discography ==
| Year | Information |
|---|---|
| 2008 | Richie - All of Me Released: August 2008 Singles: "Frema", "When I Get You", "Dirty Dance" |
| 2008 | ASEM - Better Late Than Never Released: August 2008 Singles: "Give Me Blow", "Pigaro", "Sulliya" |
| 2009 | Irene Logan Released: February 2009 Single: "Runaway" |
| 2009 | OJ Blaq - Biggie Boy Lover Released: October 2009 Singles: "Biggie Boy Lover", "Chale Wote", "Target" |
| 2010 | Richie - UKNR Released: May 2010 Singles: "Ma Nim Ton", "Yaaro", "Intoxicated", "Asa Fofro" |
| 2010 | ASEM - No More Kpayor Released: March 2010 Singles: "2010 Fylla", "No More Kpayor" |
| 2010 | Eazzy - Twinkle Released: August 2010 Singles: "Bo Wonsem Ma Me", "Wengeze", "One Gal" |
| 2011 | Lynx Entertainment - Back 2 Zero Released: July 2011 Singles: "African Moment", "Tonor 4 Me", "Go Hard All Day", "Let's Get It Started", "Yen Ara Asase Ni" |
| 2011 | Zigi - Prince of Pop Released: October 2011 Singles: "U Sey Wey Tin", "Amanda", "Let's Get It Started" |
| 2012 | D3 Singles: "Good Girls Gone Bad", "Gyani Gyani" |
| 2014 | MzVee - Reveelation Released: November 2014 Singles: "Borkor Borkor", "Natural Girl", "Carpenter", "Revolution", "Dancehall Queen", "My Time", "Reveelation" |
| 2015 | MzVee - Verified Released: November 2015 Singles: "Abofra", "Hold Me Now", "Mensuro Obia", "End Poverty" |
| 2017 | MzVee - DaaVee Released: May 2017 Singles: "Rewind", "Daavi", "We Run Dem", "Sing My Name" |
| 2018 | Kuami Eugene - Rockstar Released: December 2018 Singles: "Angela", "Confusion", "Wish Me Well", "Walaahi" |
| 2019 | KiDi - Sugar Released: May 2019 Singles: "Adiepena", "Thunder", "Mr Badman", "Sugar Daddy" |
| 2020 | KiDi - Blue EP Released: May 2020 Singles: "Say Cheese", "One Man" |
| 2020 | Kuami Eugene - Son of Africa Released: October 2020 Singles: "Open Gate", "Wa Ye Wie", "Show Body", "Amen" |
| 2021 | KiDi - Golden Boy Released: June 2021 Singles: "Spiritual", "Touch It" |
