= Zigi =

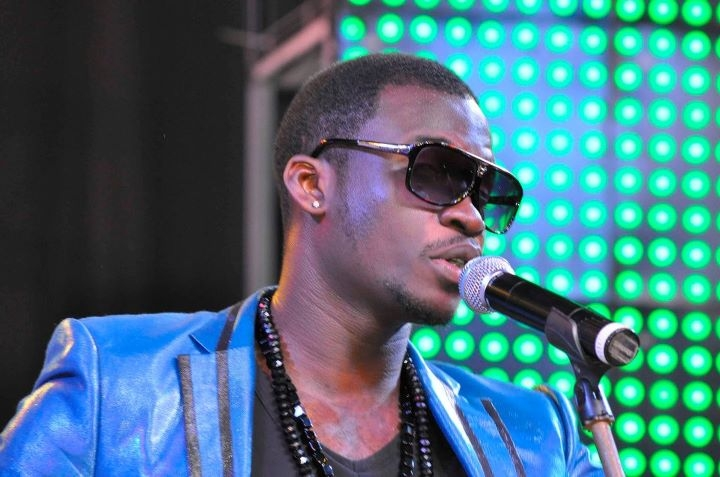
- Zigi at the 2011 4syte video music awards

Background information
- Born: Kweku Sarpong Plahar; 26 October 1988 (age 37)
- Origin: Accra, Ghana
- Genres: R&B, Hiplife
- Occupation: Singer
- Years active: 2010 – present
- Label: Lynx Entertainment

Kweku Sarpong Plahar (born 26 October 1988), better known by his stage name Zigi, is a Ghanaian singer.

== Biography ==
Zigi began his career in the entertainment industry as a break dancer before going on to model for Smirnoff, MTN, and Canoe Magazine. He signed to Lynx Entertainment Record Label in 2009 and released his debut album ‘Prince of Pop’ in 2011. The album featured hit singles U Sey Wey Tin and Amanda and earned him the nomination for ‘Discovery of the Year’ at the 2011 4syte Music Video Awards.

Zigi received three nominations at the 2012 Ghana Music Awards for 'Best New Artiste of the Year', 'Afro-Pop Song of the Year' and 'Most Popular Song of the Year'. He went on to win the award for 'Afro-Pop Song of the Year' at the ceremony on 14 April 2012.
