= Kuami Eugene =

Ghanaian musician (born 1997)

- Also known as: RockStar
- Born: Eugene Kwame Marfo; 1 February 1997 (age 29); Oda, Ghana
- Genres: Afro pop, Highlife, Afrobeats
- Occupations: Singer, record producer
- Instruments: Vocals; keyboard; guitar
- Years active: 2016–present
- Label: Empire
- Website: www.lynxghana.com

Eugene Kwame Marfo (born February 1, 1997), who goes by the stage name Kuami Eugene is a Ghanaian High-life and Afrobeat singer-songwriter and record producer. He was signed to Lynx Entertainment and Empire Distribution and is known for several songs, including "Angela", "Wish Me Well", "Ohemaa", "Wa Ye Wie" and many others. He won the Unsung and New Artist awards in 2017 and 2018 from the Ghana Music Awards respectively, and the Ghana Music Awards UK. He also received the Most Promising Artist in Africa award from AFRIMA / LYNXGHANA. In 2019, Kwame Eugene received 7 nominations at the Ghana Music Awards and went on to win the awards for Album of the Year, Producer of the Year, and Highlife Artist of the Year. He was crowned Artist of the Year and High-life Artist of the Year at the 2020 Ghana Music Awards.

== Early life ==
Kuami Eugene was born to Alex and Juliana Marfo in Akim Oda, Ghana. His interest in music led him to sing in the church from a young age where he also learned how to play the drum, keyboard, and guitar. He attended the Salvation Army Senior High School located at Akim-Wenchi. The young artist, who grew up in the environs of Fadama, a suburb of Accra furthered his education at Ghana Telecom University.

== Music career ==
His breakthrough happened when he took part in the MTN Hitmaker competition. Kuami Eugene was a contestant in season 5 of the reality competition show MTN Hitmaker in Ghana in 2016, where he finished third overall. He was signed shortly afterward to Lynx Entertainment and has gone on to release several singles. In 2017, Angela reached one million views on YouTube, the most for any music artist on that label, and was indicated to be in rotation among the top 10 songs in Ghana. He is a featured artist in "Adwenfi" by DJ Vyrusky and Shatta Wale. In 2018, he released a continuation of the story line in the "Angela" song called "Confusion". And in June 2018, he released the single "Wish Me Well" out of pain, in response to the negative comments he received on social media.

On 25 December 2017, he performed at Sarkodie's annual Rapperholic Concert . That same year, he performed at Ghana Music Honors 2017 Edition, December to Remember 2017, Concert 2017, and at the 61st Ghana Independence Celebration Show at Indigo 02 in London. Kuami Eugene has gone on to perform on many more stages including at Oh My Festival in Amsterdam, Afrobeats to the World concert at the PlayStation Theatre in New York City, and Afronation in Ghana.

In May 2022, Kuami Eugene released his single 'Take Away' and performed at the 2022 Afrochella in Ghana. Kuami Eugene has maintained his relevance over the years, releasing hit songs every year, and some of the latest of these include "Monica", "Canopy", "Problem", and "Showdown".

In November 2022, Kuami Eugene released another song titled ‘Single’ after signing to the Empire Distribution, an American record label. This was his first song after signing and transitioning officially from Lynx Entertainment. "I feel nice", another single also was released in December of the same year under Empire Distribution.

=== Producer ===
Eugene has produced a number of songs either for himself or his fellow artists. Below are some of the songs he has produced;

- Bebe by Akasii.
- Paradise by Mysstel.
- Fa Meko by Emelia Brobbey.

== Recognition ==
Legendary High-life artist Amakye Dede crowned Kuami Eugene as his successor in high-life music at the 20th edition of the Vodafone Ghana Music Awards.

On the 21st Vodafone Music Awards held at Accra International Conference Centre, Kuami Eugene won the Artiste of the Year, beating Sarkodie, Medikal, Kofi Kinaata and Diana Hamilton.

== Controversies ==
=== Song theft allegations ===
In October 2021, a notable incident emerged within the music scene as Bhadext Cona, a musician, publicly accused Kuami Eugene of engaging in song plagiarism. The genesis of this controversy can be traced back to Bhadext Cona's original intention to collaborate with Kuami Eugene on her track titled "Bolga." However, she alleges that instead of honoring the collaborative project, Kuami Eugene repurposed the song and transformed it into his solo release, which he named "Bunker."

== Discography ==
=== Singles ===
| Title | Year | Album |
|---|---|---|
| "Ɛbɛyɛyie" | 2017 | Non-album singles |
| "Fadama Boy" | 2017 | Non-album singles |
| "Hiribaba" (featuring MzVee) | 2017 | Non-album singles |
| "Boom Bang Bang" | 2017 | Non-album singles |
| "Angela" | 2017 | Rockstar |
| "Confusion" | 2018 | Rockstar |
| "Wish Me Well" | 2018 | Rockstar |
| "Wish Me Well remix" (featuring Ice Prince) | 2018 | Non-album singles |
| "Meji Meji" (featuring Davido) | 2018 | Non-album singles |
| "Walaahi" | 2018 | Rockstar |
| "No More" (featuring Sarkodie) | 2019 | Rockstar |
| "Ohemaa" (featuring KiDi) | 2019 | Non-album singles |
| "Obiaato" | 2019 | Non-album singles |
| "Turn Up" | 2020 | Non-album singles |
| "Ghana We Dey" (featuring Samini & Shatta Wale) | 2020 | Son of Africa |
| "Open Gate" | 2020 | Son of Africa |
| "Son Of Africa" | 2020 | Son of Africa |
| "Show Body" (featuring Fals) | 2020 | Son of Africa |
| "Marry Me" | 2020 | Son of Africa |
| "Dance Hard" (featuring Zlatan) | 2020 | Son of Africa |
| "Will You" | 2020 | Son of Africa |
| "Give It To Me" (featuring Eddy Kenzo) | 2020 | Son of Africa |
| "Beifour" (featuring Sarkodie & DJ Mensah) | 2020 | Son of Africa |
| "Amen" | 2020 | Son of Africa |
| "Scolom" (featuring Prince Bright) | 2020 | Son of Africa |
| "Wa Ye Wie" (featuring Obaapa Christy) | 2020 | Son of Africa |
| "Mama" | 2020 | Son of Africa |
| "Ewurade" | 2020 | Son of Africa |
| "Fire Fire" | 2022 | Fire Fire |
| "Take Away" | | Take Away |
| "Monica" | 2023 | Love and Chaos |
| "Rags To Riches" | 2023 | Love and Chaos |
| "Fate" | 2023 | Love and Chaos |
| "Yolo" | 2023 | Love and Chaos |
| "Energy" (featuring Guchi) | 2023 | Love and Chaos |
| "Puerto Rico" | 2023 | Love and Chaos |
| "Cryptocurrency" (featuring Rotimi) | 2023 | Love and Chaos |
| "Abena" | 2023 | Love and Chaos |
| "Single" | 2023 | Love and Chaos |
| "No Promo" | 2023 | Love and Chaos |
| "Best Part" (featuring Magixx) | 2023 | Love and Chaos |
| "Favorite Girl" | 2023 | Love and Chaos |
| "Anyway" (Weezy & BackRoad Gee) | 2023 | Love and Chaos |
| "Do Better" | 2025 | Do Better |
| "Do Better remix" (featuring RG Qluck Wise) | 2025 | Do Better |
| "Lamine Yamal" | 2025 | |

=== As featured artist ===
Below are some of the singles Kuami Eugene has been featured on.

List of singles, showing title and year released with selected chart positions
| Title | Year | Chart positions | | | | | | | | | | Certifications | Album |
| Title | Year | AUS | FRA | GER | NLD | NOR | NZ | SWE | SWI | UK | US | Certifications | Album |
|---|---|---|---|---|---|---|---|---|---|---|---|---|---|
| "Rewind" (MzVee featuring Kuami Eugene) | 2017 | – | – | – | – | – | – | – | – | – | — | | Daavi |
| "Adwenfi" (DJ Vyrusky featuring Shatta Wale & Kuami Eugene) | 2017 | – | – | – | – | – | – | – | – | – | — | | Non-album singles |
| "Killing Me Softly" (Adina featuring Kuami Eugene) | 2018 | – | – | – | – | – | – | – | – | – | — | | Non-album singles |
| "Kwani Kwani" (Tic featuring Kuami Eugene) | 2018 | – | – | – | – | – | – | – | – | – | — | | Non-album singles |
| "Baby Girl" (Strongman featuring Kuami Eugene) | 2018 | – | – | – | – | – | – | – | – | – | — | | Non-album singles |
| "New African Girl" (Fuse ODG featuring KiDi & Kuami Eugene) | 2018 | 90 | – | – | – | – | – | – | – | – | — | | Non-album singles |
| "Back To Sender" (DJ Breezy featuring Kuami Eugene, Darko Vibes & Kwesi Arthur) | 2018 | – | – | – | – | – | – | – | – | – | — | | Non-album singles |
| "Bend Down" (MzVee featuring Kuami Eugene ft issa Alpha Amadu koroma) | 2018 | – | – | – | – | – | – | – | – | – | — | | Non-album singles |
| "Drogba (Joanna) – new Africa remix" (Afro B featuring Mayorkun, Kuami Eugene, KiDi & Frenna) | 2018 | – | – | – | – | – | – | – | – | – | — | | Non-album singles |
| "Never Carry Last" (DJ Vyrusky featuring Mayorkun & Kuami Eugene) | 2018 | – | – | – | – | – | – | – | – | – | — | | Rockstar |
| "Eternity" (Jupiter featuring Kuami Eugene) | 2018 | – | – | – | – | – | – | – | – | – | — | | Non-album singles |
| "Baby" (DJ Vyrusky featuring KiDi, Shatta Wale & Kuami Eugene) | 2019 | – | – | – | – | – | – | – | – | – | — | | Non-album singles |
| "E No Be My Matter" (Okyeame Kwame featuring Kuami Eugene) | 2019 | – | – | – | – | – | – | – | – | – | — | | Made in Ghana |
| "Nothing I Get (remix)" (Fameye featuring Kuami Eugene, Medikal & Article Wan) | 2019 | – | – | – | – | – | – | – | – | – | — | | Non-album single |
| "Honey" (Sarkodie featuring Kuami Eugene) | 2019 | – | – | – | – | – | – | – | – | – | — | | Black Love |
| "Take Me Away" (Stonebwoy featuring KiDi & Kuami Eugene) | 2019 | – | – | – | – | – | – | – | – | – | — | | Non-album singles |
| "No Dulling" (Keche featuring Kuami Eugene) | 2020 | – | – | – | – | – | – | – | – | – | — | | Non-album singles |
| "Love Nwantiti (Ah Ah Ah)" (CKay featuring Joeboy and Kuami Eugene) | 2020 | 8 | 1 | 6 | 1 | 1 | 2 | 4 | 1 | 3 | 29 | ARIA: Gold; BPI: Platinum; RIAA: Gold; RMNZ: Gold | Non-album singles |
| ''Metua'' (Amerado featuring Kuami Eugene) | 2021Issa koroma | _ | _ | _ | _ | _ | _ | _ | _ | _ | _ | | Non-album singles |

== Awards and nominations ==
| Year | Organization | Award | Recipient or nominee | Result |
|---|---|---|---|---|
| 2024 | Telecel Ghana Music Awards | International Collaboration of the year | Cryptocurrency | Nominated |
| 2022 | 3Music Awards | Artist of the Year | Himself | Nominated |
| 2022 | 3Music Awards | Best Collaboration of the Year | Biibi Besi (Kwame Yogot ft. Kuami Eugene) | Nominated |
| 2022 | 3Music Awards | Best Collaboration of the Year | Yeeko (Okyeame Kwame ft. Kuami Eugene) | Nominated |
| 2022 | 3Music Awards | Best Collaboration of the Year | Happy Day (Sarkodie ft. Kuami Eugene) | Nominated |
| 2022 | 3Music Awards | Hiplife Song of the Year | Abodie (Captain Planet (4×4) ft. Kuami Eugene) | Nominated |
| 2022 | 3Music Awards | Hip-Hop Song of the Year | Yeeko (Okyeame Kwame ft. Kuami Eugene) | Nominated |
| 2022 | 3Music Awards | Afrobeats/Afropop Song of the Year | ''Dollar on You'' | Nominated |
| 2022 | 3Music Awards | Highlife Act of the Year | Himself | Nominated |
| 2022 | 3Music Awards | Song of the Year | Biibi Besi (Kwame Yogot ft. Kuami Eugene) | Nominated |
| 2022 | 3Music Awards | Song of the Year | Yeeko (Okyeame Kwame ft. Kuami Eugene) | Nominated |
| 2022 | 3Music Awards | Song of the Year | Happy Day (Sarkodie ft. Kuami Eugene) | Nominated |
| 2022 | 3Music Awards | Producer of the Year | Himself (Rockstar Made it) | Nominated |
| 2022 | 3Music Awards | Video of the Year | Spiritual (KiDi ft. Kuami Eugene, Patoranking) | Nominated |
| 2021 | Vodafone Ghana Music Awards | Artiste of the Year | Himself | Nominated |
| 2021 | Vodafone Ghana Music Awards | Highlife Song of the Year | "Open Gate" | Nominated |
| 2021 | Vodafone Ghana Music Awards | Most Popular Song of the Year | "Open Gate" | Nominated |
| 2021 | Vodafone Ghana Music Awards | Highlife Artist of the Year | Himself | Won |
| 2021 | Vodafone Ghana Music Awards | Album of the Year | "Son of Africa" | Nominated |
| 2021 | Vodafone Ghana Music Awards | International Collaboration of the Year | "Show Body" (ft Falz) | Nominated |
| 2021 | Vodafone Ghana Music Awards | Collaboration of the Year | "Happy Day" (Sarkodie ft Kuami Eugene) | Won |
| 2021 | Vodafone Ghana Music Awards | Best Music Video | "Open Gate" | Nominated |
| 2021 | 3Music Awards | Artist of the Year | Himself | Nominated |
| 2021 | 3Music Awards | Highlife Act of the Year | Himself | Won |
| 2021 | 3Music Awards | Album of the Year | "Son of Africa" | Nominated |
| 2021 | 3Music Awards | Song of the Year | "Open Gate" | Nominated |
| 2021 | 3Music Awards | Afrobeats/Afropop of the Year | "Open Gate" | Nominated |
| 2021 | 4syte TV Music Video Awards | Best Highlife Video | "Open Gate" | Nominated |
| 2021 | 4syte TV Music Video Awards | Most Popular Video | "Open Gate" | Won |
| 2021 | 4syte TV Music Video Awards | Best Male Video | "Open Gate" | Nominated |
| 2021 | 4syte TV Music Video Awards | Best Special Effect Video | "Turn Up" | Won |
| 2021 | 4syte TV Music Video Awards | Best Storyline | "Open Gate" | Nominated |
| 2021 | 4syte TV Music Video Awards | Most Influential Artist | Himself | Won |
| 2021 | 4syte TV Music Video Awards | Best Edited Video | "Open Gate" | Nominated |
| 2021 | 4syte TV Music Video Awards | Best Directed Video | "Open Gate" | Nominated |
| 2021 | 4syte TV Music Video Awards | Overall Best Video | "Open Gate" | Nominated |
| 2020 | Vodafone Ghana Music Awards | Artiste of the Year | Himself | Won |
| 2020 | Vodafone Ghana Music Awards | Highlife Song of the Year | "Obiaato" | Nominated |
| 2020 | Vodafone Ghana Music Awards | Best Video of the Year | "Obiaato" | Nominated |
| 2020 | Vodafone Ghana Music Awards | Highlife Artist of the Year | Himself | Won |
| 2020 | Vodafone Ghana Music Awards | Male Vocalist of the Year | Himself | Nominated |
| 2020 | Vodafone Ghana Music Awards | Best Collaboration of the Year | "Ohemaa" (ft KiDi) | Nominated |
| 2020 | Vodafone Ghana Music Awards | Most Popular Song of the Year | "Obiaato" | Nominated |
| 2020 | 3Music Awards | Highlife Song of the Year | "Walaahi" | Nominated |
| 2020 | 3Music Awards | Highlife Artist of the Year | "Obiaato" | Won |
| 2019 | Vodafone Ghana Music Awards | Artist of the Year | Himself | Nominated |
| 2019 | Vodafone Ghana Music Awards | Highlife Artist of the Year | Himself | Won |
| 2019 | Vodafone Ghana Music Awards | Producer of the Year | Himself | Won |
| 2019 | Vodafone Ghana Music Awards | Album of the Year | Rockstar | Won |
| 2019 | Vodafone Ghana Music Awards | Song of the Year | "Wish Me Well" | Nominated |
| 2019 | Vodafone Ghana Music Awards | Highlife Song of the Year | "Wish Me Well" | Nominated |
| 2019 | Vodafone Ghana Music Awards | Best Collaboration | "Never Carry Last" | Nominated |
| 2019 | 3Music Awards | High-life Act of the year | Himself | Won |
| 2019 | 3Music Awards | High-life Song of the year | "Wish Me Well" | Won |
| 2019 | Ghana Music Awards UK | Highlife Song of the Year | "Wish Me Well" | Won |
| 2019 | Ghana Music Awards UK | Highlife Artist of the Year | Himself | Won |
| 2019 | Ghana Music & Arts Awards Europe | Highlife Song of the Year | "Wish Me Well" | Won |
| 2019 | Ghana Music & Arts Awards Europe | Highlife Artist of the Year | Himself | Won |
| 2019 | Ghana Music & Arts Awards Europe | Artist of the Year | Himself | Won |
| 2018 | 4syte Music Video Awards | Best Story line Video | "Angela" | Nominated |
| 2018 | Ghana Music Awards | High-life Song of the Year | "Angela" | Nominated |
| 2018 | Ghana Music Awards | Song of the Year | "Angela" | Nominated |
| 2018 | Ghana Music Awards | Best Male Vocalist | Himself | Nominated |
| 2018 | Ghana Music Awards | High-life Artist of the Year | Himself | Won |
| 2018 | Ghana Music Awards | Best New Artist | Himself | Won |
| 2018 | Liberia Music Awards | Best International Artist | Himself | Nominated |
| 2018 | Ghana Music Awards UK | Best New Artist of the Year | Himself | Won |
| 2018 | AFRIMA | Most Promising Artist in Africa | Himself | Won |
| 2024 | Ghana Music Awards | Best Highlife Artiste of the Year | Himself | Won |
| 2024 | 3Music Awards | Afrobeats/Afro Pop Song of the Year | "Cryptocurrency" | Pending |
| 2024 | 3Music Awards | Afrobeats/Afro Pop Song of the Year | "Cryptocurrency" | Pending |
| 2024 | 3Music Awards | Afrobeats/Afro Pop Song of the Year | "Monica" | Pending |
| 2024 | 3Music Awards | Viral Song of the Year | "Monica" | Pending |
| 2024 | 3Music Awards | Album of the Year | Love & Chaos | Pending |
| 2024 | 3Music Awards | Artiste (MVP) of the Year | Himself | Pending |
| 2024 | 3Music Awards | Best Collaboration of the Year | "Broken Heart" | Pending |
| 2024 | 3Music Awards | Best Collaboration of the Year | "Cryptocurrency" | Pending |
| 2024 | 3Music Awards | Highlife Song of the Year | "Yolo" | Pending |
| 2024 | 3Music Awards | Highlife Act of the Year | Himself | Pending |
| 2024 | 3Music Awards | Hiplife Song of the Year | "Yahitte Remix" | Pending |
| 2024 | 3Music Awards | Producer of the Year | Broken Heart, Monica, Cryptocurrency, Victory | Pending |
| 2024 | 3Music Awards | Song of the Year | "Monica" | Pending |
| 2024 | 3Music Awards | Video of the Year | "Cryptocurrency" | Pending |
| 2024 | 3Music Awards | Video of the Year | "Broken Heart" | Pending |
| 2024 | Ghana Music Awards USA 2024 | Artist of the Year | Himself | Nominated |
| 2024 | Ghana Music Awards USA 2024 | Highlife Artist of the Year | Himself | Nominated |
| 2024 | Ghana Music Awards USA 2024 | Most Popular Song of the Year | "Monica" | Nominated |
| 2024 | Ghana Music Awards USA 2024 | Most Popular Song of the Year | "Yahitte Remix" | Nominated |
| 2024 | Ghana Music Awards USA 2024 | Best Collaboration of the Year | "Yahitte Remix" | Nominated |
| 2024 | Ghana Music Awards USA 2024 | Best Collaboration of the Year | "Broken Heart" | Nominated |
| 2024 | Ghana Music Awards USA 2024 | Best Collaboration of the Year | "Cryptocurrency" | Nominated |
| 2024 | Ghana Music Awards UK | Artist of the Year | Himself | Pending |
| 2024 | Ghana Music Awards UK | Highlife Artist of the Year | Himself | Pending |
| 2024 | Ghana Music Awards UK | Most Popular Song of the Year | "Monica" | Pending |
| 2024 | Ghana Music Awards UK | Best Collaboration of the Year | "Yahittie (Remix)" | Pending |
| 2024 | Ghana Music Awards UK | Best Music Video of the Year | "Fate" | Pending |
| 2024 | Ghana Music Awards UK | Best Music Video of the Year | "Broken Heart" | Pending |
| 2024 | Ghana Music Awards UK | Best Music Video of the Year | "Cryptocurrency" | Pending |
| 2024 | Ghana Music Awards UK | Best Afrobeats Song of the Year | "Otello" | Pending |
| 2024 | Ghana Music Awards UK | Best Afrobeats Song of the Year | "Broken Heart" | Pending |
| 2024 | Ghana Music Awards UK | Best Afrobeats Song of the Year | "Monica" | Pending |
| 2024 | Ghana Music Awards UK | Best Highlife Song of the Year | "Monica" | Pending |
| 2024 | Ghana Music Awards UK | Producer of the Year | "Monica" | Pending |
| 2024 | Ghana Music Awards UK | Best Hiplife Song of the Year | "Y'ahite (Remix)" | Pending |
