= OJ Blaq =

Ghanaian actor and musician (1983–2023)

- Born: Andy Nii Akrashie; 1983; Accra, Ghana
- Died: 17 August 2023 (aged 39–40)
- Citizenship: Ghana
- Occupations: Actor, Rapper

Andy Nii Akrashie (1983 – 17 August 2023) known professionally as OJ Blaq, was a Ghanaian actor and musician. His first album, The Blaq Mixtape, which came out in 2006, made him famous and got him a lot of attention. As time went on, he kept releasing new songs, and one of his most popular ones, "Chalewote," became a big hit.

== Life and career ==
Akrashie was born in Accra. He had his senior high school education at Achimota School and held a diploma certificate in travel and tourism at Zane Investments. He gained significant recognition in his role as Marlon 'T' on the popular television show, SUNCITY, which became a beloved show in households across Africa, Europe, and the United States.

In 2021, OJ Blaq was diagnosed with kidney disease. He underwent dialysis treatment and was awaiting a kidney transplant. OJ Blaq died on 17 August 2023, at the age of 40.
