= Strongman (rapper) =

Ghanaian rapper

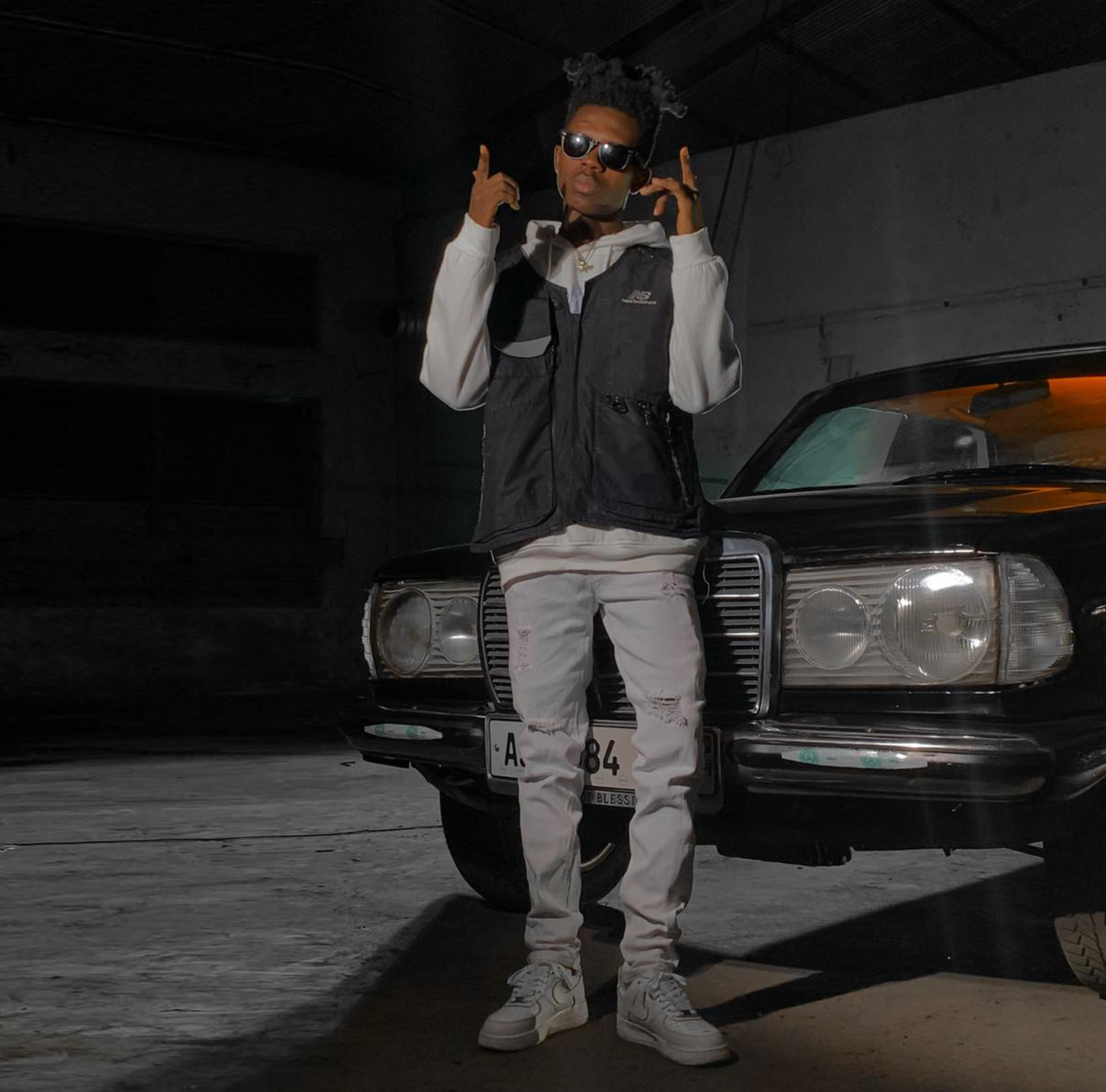
- A picture of Strongman at a video shoot in Kumasi

Background information
- Also known as: Strongman Burner & Strong Gee
- Born: Osei Kwaku Vincent; 1993/02/10
- Origin: Kumasi, Ghana
- Genres: Hip hop; hiplife; Afrobeats
- Occupations: Rapper; songwriter
- Years active: 2012-
- Label: Strong Empire

Osei Kwaku Vincent, also known as Strongman, Strongman Burner or Strong Gee is a Ghanaian rapper. He was recognized for winning the maiden edition of the Next Big Thing in GH Rap music which was a rap competition in Ghana.

== Education ==
Strongman attended T.I. Ahmadiyya Senior High School, Kumasi and later further his education to the tertiary level by attending the University of Cape Coast.

== Discography ==
List of Strongman's songs.

- Big Boy
- Pilolo
- Bossu
- Baby Girl
- Don't Try
- Wahali
- Transformer
- Immortal
- Odasini
- Nana Ama
- Still Nigga
- Crazy For You
- Ups & Down
- 21st Century
- The Second Coming
- Vision
- Kings of Gods
- Monster
- Obi Pe
- Girl Kasa
- Nkokra
- Twa Wo Nan Ase
- Mmaa
- Dose
- Onoaa Na Mepe
- Paid My Dues
- My Vibe
- Mene Woaa
- Paper
- Hooks & Lines
- You Ain't Seen Nothing Yet
- Old School
- No Diss
- Whine
- Obra (2024)
- Akroma(2024)
- Party ft Fameye (2024)

=== Album ===
- God And Rap(2024)

== Awards/Achievements ==
He won the Focus fm Freestyle Friday in 2010, Kfm Freestyle Saturday in 2011 and The Next Big Thing In Ghanaian Hip-hop in 2012 under MicBurnerz Music label headed by Azee Ntwene. He was the best rapper for the Ghana Music Awards SA.

Year	Ceremony	Nominee/work	Award	Results	Cite
2024	Telecel Ghana Music Awards	Dear God-Strongman	Best RaP Performance	Won	

== Performance ==
He was among the musicians to perform on the first day at the 2020 VGMA Awards night.
