= Shatta Wale =

Ghanaian reggae-dancehall artist (born 1984)

- Shatta Wale in 2023

Background information
- Also known as: Bandana
- Born: Charles Nii Armah Mensah Jr. 17 October 1984 (age 42); Accra, Ghana
- Genres: Highlife; hiplife; reggae; dancehall; Afrobeats
- Occupations: Singer; songwriter; record producer; actor; sound engineer
- Instruments: Vocals; keyboard
- Years active: 2004–present
- Labels: Shatta Movement Records; Zylofon Music

Charles Nii Armah Mensah Jr., (born 17 October 1984) known by his stage name Shatta Wale, formerly Bandana, is a Ghanaian reggae-dancehall artist.

== Early life and education ==
Charles Nii Armah Mensah Jr. was born in Korle Gonno from Accra, Ghana at the Police Hospital on 17 October 1984 to Charles Nii Armah Mensah Snr and Elsie Evelyn Avemegah. His father is a politician, businessman and legal practitioner.

He attended Seven Great Princes Academy at Dansoman, a suburb in Accra, where he demonstrated an affinity for arts and acted in a popular drama series, By the Fireside, at the National Theatre of Ghana. He continued to the Winneba Secondary School, where he obtained his second cycle education.

At the start of his career, he was called Doggy.

== Career ==
Wale started with the stage name "Bandana" after senior high school, and released the hit track "Bandana from Ghana" in 2004.

Wale's 2004 recording "Moko Hoo" was nominated for a Ghana Music Award.

His sudden rise to fame happened at the 2013 VGMA awards, when he threw lyrical insults to the VGMA (now Telecel Ghana Music Awards), because he said they had robbed him of the Dancehall Artist of the Year award. Although the song had vulgar lyrics, it was anticipated by the media, which created his musical breakthrough.

His biggest hit in 2013, "Dancehall King," gained significant radio airplay in Ghana. His primary source of revenue is hosting events, which attract thousands of young Ghanaians.

In 2014, he peaked at number 38 on E.tv's "Top 100 Most Influential Ghanaian" Awards chart. He has since then appeared on the chart every year.

In 2015, Wale asked not to be nominated in the Vodafone Ghana Music Awards even though he could have won the Artiste & Song of the year for the second time running with his hit songs "Dancehall Commando" featuring Sarkodie, "Party all night long" featuring Jah Vinci, "Wine Ya Waist" featuring Davido, and "Korle Gonno" among many hit songs he released the preceding year. Because of an impending court case with the organisers of the awards, Charter House Productions Ltd, for allegedly making defamatory remarks against the CEO of Charter House in a video he uploaded on his Facebook page.

His best-known singles are "Dancehall King", "My Level" and "Taking Over". "Dancehall King" earned him the Artiste of the Year at the 2014 edition of the Vodafone Ghana Music Awards.

Wale is also an actor, and appeared in the films Never Say Never, The trial of Shatta Wale and Shattered Lives.

He was ranked "Most Influential Musician" on social media in 2017. He made a record-setting as a dancehall artist to have won 11 awards at the 2019 3 Music Awards ceremony.

In 2019, Wale had a collaboration with Beyoncé titled "Already" on her album The Lion King: The Gift, which was nominated for a Grammy Award.

In 2021, he was nominated for two awards and won the 'Best Virtual Entertainer of the Year' Award at the International Reggae and World Music Awards (IRAWMA).

Wale released a song in January 2024 titled "Balloon", with an accompanying video.

He performed at Vybz Kartel's Freedom Street concert in Jamaica.

On April 10, 2025, Wale hosted Nigerian TikTok influencer Peller at his mansion in Ghana, sparking viral online attention through their collaborative videos and promotional appearances, particularly in connection with Shaxi, his ride-hailing company.

== Concerts ==
Wale was the first Ghanaian to organize a digital concert on YouTube, which was dubbed the Faith Concert. This was organized to bring hope to Ghanaians and his global audience at large during the fight against the COVID-19 pandemic. He was selected by the Ministry of Communications, Ghana, alongside highlife musician Kuami Eugene as the headline artistes for the COVID-19 app virtual launch concert held on Monday April 13, 2020.

On 31 December 2024, Vybz Kartel invited Wale to perform at his Freedom Street Concert in Jamaica, due to the love and support he had shown him over the years, even when Vybz Kartel was in prison. The show featured top international artistes like Busta Rhymes, Chronic Law, Shawn Storm, Masicka, Bounty Killer, Jah Vinci, Rvssian, Spice, and Popcaan.

On 18 October 2025, Wale hosted "Shatta Fest 2025 x Shattabration: The King Calls" at Black Star Square in Accra, drawing tens of thousands of fans for a free all-night concert. The event featured performances by top Ghanaian artists and tributes, marking his birthday celebration with support from MoMo Fest, Shaxi, and Charterhouse.

== Awards and recognition ==
The Mayor of Worcester, Joseph Petty, presented Wale with the key to the city on 8 July 2017.

On 18 March 2018, Wale was presented an honoree award for his contribution to reggae in Ghana at the 37th Annual Chicago Music Awards (CMA), in conjunction with the 36th International Reggae & World Music Awards (IRAWMA).

On 24 April 2025, Wale was recognized at the University of Ghana's Brands and Marketing Masterclass, where his brand and marketing skills were studied.

Shatta Wale in 2026 has won many awards including Best African Dancehall Entertainer and Concert of the Year for his event, Shatta Fest at the 43rd IRAWMA.

== Endorsements ==
In 2014, Wale became a brand ambassador for Guinness Ghana Breweries. and as the brand ambassador for Rush Energy Drink.

In September 2017, Kasapreko Company Limited, producers of several alcoholic and non-alcoholic beverages in Ghana, unveiled Wale as their newest brand ambassador for Storm Energy Drink. 19 July 2023, Kasapreko Company Limited (KCL) renewed Wale's ambassador deal.

On 17 November 2017, Wale signed a deal with Boss Baker Beef Roll as the brand ambassador. Infinix Ghana, a smartphone company, on September 11, 2019, announced Shatta Wale as its brand ambassador.

== Philanthropy ==
On June 12, 2024, Wale supported the "Buzstop Boys" in a community clean up exercise at Alajo in Accra and donated some amount through his foundation to the organization to keep up with their environmental initiatives.

== Accra Invasion Project ==
On 16 September 2024, Wale announced the Accra Invasion Project (AIP), an initiative to discover and support talented individuals in Accra, the capital of Ghana. The project has since promoted nine artists: Papillon Blood, Shattonzy, Zicoranking, JoeQuaye, Blakid, Boy Cray, Kinjunia, Dosted Gennah, and Sanaa, the only female among them.

== Controversies ==
In October 2021, Wale allegedly created a hoax that he was shot and was receiving treatment. He later turned himself in to the police. He was arrested by the Ghana Police Service for allegedly involved in the creation and circulation of information to create fear and panic. He was remanded into prison custody for a week. On Tuesday, 26 October 2021, Shatta Wale was granted a GH¢100,000 self-recognizance bail at today's hearing. The case has been adjourned to November 9, 2021. A fortnight after the artist was released on bail, he got caught in another confrontation with the Police as he stormed out of meeting with celebrities called at the behest of Ghana's Police Chief. Shatta Wale complained of unfair treatment at the meeting after all his colleagues were allegedly allowed to use their phones and he was not. He later reported to the meeting, he is Currently in Jail in US.

In June 2025, Ghana's Economic and Organised Crime Office (EOCO) seized Wale’s 2019 Lamborghini Urus during a search at his Trassaco Valley residence. The operation followed a request from the U.S. Federal Bureau of Investigation (FBI) in connection with Nana Kwabena Amuah, a Ghanaian convicted in the United States for money laundering and fraud.

Wale voluntarily surrendered the car, but denied links to criminal activity, claiming he bought it for US $150,000 without knowledge of its alleged origins. He later accused EOCO's executive director of intimidation and abuse of power.

EOCO described the operation as professional and identified Wale as a person of interest while awaiting a U.S. request to repatriate the vehicle under a mutual legal assistance treaty.

On 20 August 2025, Wale was detained after voluntarily appearing at the EOCO for questioning related to the Lamborghini, which U.S. authorities said may be linked to proceeds from a $4 million fraud case. He was held overnight and released the next day on bail. His bail conditions initially required GH₵10 million with two sureties, but these were later revised to GH₵5 million with continued obligations to report regularly to EOCO. Wale's legal team stated they were cooperating with authorities, and he remains a person of interest in the ongoing investigation.

== Feuds ==
Being a controversial artiste in the Ghana music industry, Wale has had arguments with many of his fellow artistes, such as:

- Stonebwoy: In 2018, Stonebwoy was asked about Shatta Wale's claim that Stonebwoy had refused to collaborate with him. Stonebwoy responded by saying that Shatta Wale had suggested that Stonebwoy was responsible for his mother's death in 2015. Shatta Wale denied the allegations in an interview. The beef escalated when Shatta Wale and his crew went up on stage to congratulate Stonebwoy after he won the Vodafone Ghana Music Awards for Dancehall Artiste of the Year. This led to Stonebwoy pulling out a gun on stage.
- Sarkodie: Shatta Wale has commented on his beef with Sarkodie, saying that if he replies to Sarkodie, Sarkodie's mother will beg him to stop making music.

In 2023, Wale and Kwadwo Sheldon of Kwadwo Sheldon Studios (KSS) went into entertainment beefing. The source of this beef was a comment made by Sheldon: "In his songs, Shatta Wale portrays himself as a gangster, yet he contacted the police following an online dispute". Sheldon said in an interview that he was reported to the IGP of Ghana, George Akuffo Dampare by Wale on charges of belittling his work. On May 3, 2024, upon Wale arriving at the London airport before his performance at Indigo at The O2, Wale visibly snubbed Sheldon, who had extended his hand in greeting.

== #OccupyJulorbiHouse ==
Wale joined the discussion surrounding the OccupyJulorbiHouse protest, expressing his disapproval of the arrest of demonstrators who were marching towards Jubilee House on September 21. His criticism of the arrests garnered support from many of his fans, some of whom suggested that he should create a song dedicated to President Akufo-Addo.

== Personal life ==
Wale has a son with Ghanaian socialite Michelle Diamonds. He proposed to Diamonds on stage at the launch of his Reign album in 2018, but they separated in 2019 over domestic violence issues.

Wale and his girlfriend, Maali, announced the birth of their first child, a girl. They made their relationship public in 2023 after sharing photos and videos. This is Wale's fifth child but his first with Maali.

During an October 2023 interview with the BBC's Stefania Okereke, Shatta Wale expressed regret for not pursuing a career in law. He said he was considering becoming a lawyer in the future, when he feels "financially ready", despite his music career, as law was his initial aspiration.

== Discography ==
=== Studio albums ===
- Green Times Mixtape (2014)
- Answers (The Hybrid) (2014)
- After the Storm (2016)
- Reign (2018)
- Wonder Boy (2019)
- Manacles of a Shatta (2020)
- Maali (2023)
- Konekt (2024)
- Shatta and Fans Album (2024)
- African King (2026)

=== Singles ===
Year	Title	Album	Ref.
2016	Aroma	Currency Year Mixtape	
2016	Like You	After the Storm	
2015	Reality	Unknown	
2016	Kill Dem with Prayers	Unknown	
2016	Kakai	Unknown	
2016	Longtime	After the Storm	
2016	Dancehall King (Part 2)	After the Storm	
2017	Haters	Unknown	
2017	Affi Di Money	Unknown	
2017	Shame On You	Unknown	
2017	Disaster	African Takeover	
2017	Patoranking	African Takeover	
2018	Zylofon	Unknown	
2018	True Believer	Unknown	
2018	Ego Taya Dem	Unknown	
2018	Storm	Unknown	
2018	Shito	Unknown	
2018	Performer	Unknown	
2018	Thunder Fire	Unknown	
2018	Don't Baby My baby	Reign	
2018	Bend Over	Reign	
2018	Squeeze	Reign	
2018	I Regret	Reign	
2018	If i See	Reign	
2018	Give Dem Something	Reign	
2018	Crazy	Reign	
2018	Amount	Reign	
2018	Wonders	Reign	
2018	Rosalinda	Reign	
2018	Sister Sister	Reign	
2018	Mama Stories	Reign	
2018	Gringo	Reign	
2018	My Mind Is Made Up	Reign	
2018	Caesar	Reign	
2018	Exodus	Reign	
2018	One Way Style	Reign	
2018	My Level	Unknown	
2019	Shatta with 9 (feat. 9TYZ)	Unknown	
2019	Packaging (feat. Medikal)	Unknown	
2019	Run 4 yuh life	Unknown	
2019	No Look	Unknown	
2019	Weather Forecast	Unknown	
2019	I Hate Nonsense	Unknown	
2019	Borjor	Unknown	
2020	Miss Money	Unknown	
2020	Ahodwo Las Vegas ft Kofi Jamar, Amerado, Ypee, Kweku Flick, King Paluta, Phrimpong & Phaize	Unknown	
2020	Party with the Stars (Feat. Munga Honorable, Tifa)	Unknown	
2022	Born Crey	Unknown	
2022	Bess Lyf ft Jupitar	Unknown	
2022	Fear Mi	Unknown	
2022	On God	Unknown	
2022	Shoulder	Unknown	
2022	Hunter	Unknown	
2024	2024	Unknown	
2024	Designer	Unknown	
2024	Who say	Unknown	
2024	Blessings ft Amerado	SAFA	
2025	Jo Lese	Unknown	
2025	Street Crown	Voice of the Crown	

== Videography ==
Year	Title	Director	Ref.
2020	Hajia Bintu (feat. Ara B & Captan)	Shatta Wale & PKMI	
2019	Island	Yaw Skyface	
2019	Crazy	sesan	
201	My level	Sesan	
2018	Gringo	Sesan	
2018	Bullet Proof	Sesan	
2017	Nobody Go Talk	Rex	
2017	Life Changer	Rex	
2017	Waitti	Will Drey	
2017	Ayoo	Sire Chopperson	
2017	Taking Over	Sire Chopperson	
2016	Shatta Story	Mexx Studio	
2016	Krom Aye Shi (Town Make Hot)	Lex MacCarthy	
2016	Too Sweet	Will Drey	
2016	Story to Tell	Prince Dovlo	
2016	Too Much Chemical	Prince Dovlo	
2016	Kill Dem with Prayers	Lex MacCarthy	
2016	Kakai	Xpress Philms	
2016	Baby (Chop Kiss)	Lex MacCarthy	
2013	Every Body Like My Tin	PressPlay Vidz	48
2015	Gather Around	Lex MacCarthy	49

== Filmography ==
Year	Title	Role	Ref.
2016	Shattered Lives	—N/a	
2014	Never Say Never	—N/a	
2018	The Trial of Shatta Wale (Kejetia Vs Makola)	Shatta Wale	
2023	Serwaa		

== Awards and nominations ==
Year	Event	Prize	Recipient	Result	Reference
2013	Ghana Music Awards	Reggae Dancehall Song of the Year – Shatta City	Shatta Wale	Nominated	
2014	Channel O Music Video Awards	Most Gifted Ragga Dancehall Video	"Everybody Likes My Ting"	Nominated	
2014	4Syte TV Music Video Awards	Best Reggae/Dancehall Video	"Everybody Likes My Ting"	Won	
2014	4Syte TV Music Video Awards	Most Popular Video	"Everybody Likes My Ting"	Won	
2014	2014 Nigeria Entertainment Awards	African Artiste of the Year		Won	
2014	African Muzik Magazine Awards	Best Male West Africa		Nominated	
2014	African Muzik Magazine Awards	Best Dancehall Artiste		Nominated	
2014	Ghana Music Awards	Artiste of the Year		Won	
2014	Ghana Music Awards	Best Collaboration of the Year	"Hot Cake"; Pope Skinny feat. Shatta Wale	Nominated	
2014	Ghana Music Awards	Reggae/Dancehall Song of the Year	"Hot Cake"; Pope Skinny feat. Shatta Wale	Nominated	
2014	Ghana Music Awards	Reggae/Dancehall Song of the Year	"Fever"; D2 feat. Shatta Wale	Nominated	
2014	Ghana Music Awards	Reggae/Dancehall Song of the Year	"Dancehall King"	Won	
2014	Nigerian Entertainment Awards	African Artiste of the Year		Won	
2014	BASS Awards	Best Performer of the Year		Won	
2014	BASS Awards	Best Collaboration of the year	D2 ft. Shatta Wale – "Fever"	Nominated	
2014	BASS Awards	Best Collaboration of the year	Shatta Wale ft. D Black – "Ina the Party"	Nominated	
2014	BASS Awards	Best Video Dancehall	"Like My Thing"	Won	
2014	BASS Awards	Dancehall Artiste of the Year	Shatta Wale – "Enter the Net"	Won	
2014	International Reggae and World Music Awards	Best New Entertainer	Shatta Wale	Won	
2014	Jigwe Awards	Jigwe Musician of the Year	Shatta Wale	Won	
2014	Ghana DJ Awards	DJ's Song of the Year	Shatta Wale – Dancehall King	Won	
2015	African Entertainment Awards	Best African Reggae / Dancehall Artiste	Shatta Wale	Nominated	
2015	African Muzik Magazine Awards	Best Dancehall Artiste	Shatta Wale	Nominated	
2015	Swish HQ UK Awards	Best Song	Shatta Wale & Sonni Bali	Nominated	
2015	International Reggae and World Music Awards	Best Music Video – You Can't Touch Me	Shatta Wale	Nominated	
2015	3G Awards	Publisher's Choice Award	Shatta Wale	Won	
2015	MOBO Awards	Best African Act	Shatta Wale	Nominated	
2015	GN Bank Awards	People's Choice Male Musician	Shatta Wale	Won	
2016	Blogging and Social Media Awards	Artiste with the Best Social Media Presence	Shatta Wale	Won	
2016	Golden Movie Awards Africa	Golden Discovery	Shatta Wale	Won	
2016	Africa Europe DJ Awards (Italy)	Best Song of the Year – Kakai	Shatta Wale	Won	
2016	Nigeria Entertainment Awards	African Male Artiste of the Year	Shatta Wale	Won	
2016	Afrimma Awards	Dancehall Artiste of the Year	Shatta Wale	Won	
2016	Africa Youth Choice Awards	Artiste of the Year	Shatta Wale	Nominated	
2016	City People Entertainment Awards	Ghana Musician of the Year Award – Male	Shatta Wale	Won	
2016	Africa Entertainment Awards – US	Best Dancehall Artiste	Shatta wale	Won	
2016	International Reggae and World Music Awards	Best African Song/Entertainer – Chop Kiss	Shatta wale	Won	
2016	International Reggae and World Music Awards	Best Music Video -Chop Kiss	Shatta Wale	Nominated	
2016	Ghana Kids Choice Awards	Best Dancehall Icon of the Year	Shatta Wale	Won	
2016	African Royal Awards	Best International Act	Shatta Wale	Won	
2016	Ghana DJ Awards	DJ's Song of the Year – Kakai	Shatta Wale	Won	
2016	African Entertainment Legends Awards	African Dancehall Act of the Year	Shatta Wale	Nominated	
2016	Ghana Music Awards UK	Music Producer of the Year	Shatta Wale (Da Maker)	Won	
2016	Ghana Music Awards UK	Most Popular Song – Kakai	Shatta Wale	Won	
2016	Ghana Music Awards UK	Most Popular Song – Chop Kiss	Shatta Wale	Nominated	
2016	Ghana Music Awards UK	Reggae / Dancehall Song of the Year – Kakai	Shatta Wale	Nominated	
2016	Ghana Music Awards UK	Reggae / Dancehall Song of the Year – Hol' It	Shatta Wale	Nominated	
2016	Ghana Music Awards UK	Reggae / Dancehall Artiste of the Year	Shatta Wale	Won	
2016	Ghana Music Awards UK	Album of the Year	After the Storm – Shatta Wale	Nominated	
2016	Ghana Music Awards UK	Artiste of the Year	Shatta Wale	Nominated	
2016	Ghana Music Awards UK 2018	Raggae/Dancehall song of the Year	Shatta Wale	Nominated	
2016	WatsUp African Music Video Awards	Best West African Video	Chop Kiss – Shatta Wale	Nominated	
2016	WatsUp African Music Video Awards	Best African Male Video	Chop Kiss – Shatta Wale	Nominated	
2016	WatsUp African Music Video Awards	Best African Performance	After The Storm – Shatta Wale	Nominated	
2016	WatsUp African Music Video Awards	Best African Reggae/Dancehall Video	Chop Kiss – Shatta Wale	Won	
2016	4Syte Music Video Awards	Best Reggae/Dancehall Video	Shatta Wale	Won	
2016	4Syte Music Video Awards	Most Popular Video	Shatta Wale	Nominated	
2016	4Syte Music Video Awards	Best Directed Video	Shatta Wale	Nominated	
2016	4Syte Music Video Awards	Best Story Line Video	Shatta Wale	Nominated	
2016	4Syte Music Video Awards	Best Male Video	Shatta Wale	Nominated	
2016	4Syte Music Video Awards	Most Influential Artiste	Shatta Wale	Won	
2016	Ghana Peace Awards	Art for Peace of the Year	Shatta Wale	Won	
2016	muzato emmerson Music Awards	People Choice of the Year	Shatta Wale	Won	
2016	Africa Youth Awards	Musician of the Year	Shatta Wale	Nominated	
2016	Jigwe Awards	Jigwe Musician of the Year	Shatta Wale	Nominated	
2017	Ghana Music Honours	Best Producer	Shatta Wale	Won	
2017	Ghana Music Honours	People's Choice Award	Shatta Wale	Won	
2017	Ghana Naija Showbiz Awards	Best Male Act	Shatta Wale	Won	
2017	Ghana Entertainment Awards USA	Best Song	Shatta Wale-Kakai	Won	
2017	EMY Africa Awards	Man of the Year – Entertainment	Shatta Wale	Nominated	
2017	Ghana Entertainment Awards USA	Best Entertainer	Shatta Wale	Won	
2017	African Pride Awards	Artiste of the Year	Shatta Wale	Won	
2017	Ghana Events Awards	Best Event Set Up	Shatta Wale (After the Storm Concert)	Won	
2017	Ghana Music Awards UK	Afro Beats Artiste of the Year	Shatta Wale	Won	
2017	Ghana Music Awards UK	Collaboration of the Year	Shatta Wale ft Addi sef, Captan & Joint 77	Won	
2017	Ghana Music Awards UK	Artiste of the Year	Shatta Wale	Won	
2017	Ghana Music Awards UK	Afro Pop Artiste of the Year	Shatta Wale	Won	
2017	Ghana Music Awards UK	Reggae/Dancehall Artiste of the Year	Shatta Wale	Won	
2017	Eastern Music Awards	Most Influential Artiste of the Year	Shatta Wale	Won	
2017	African Entertainment Awards (US)	Best Dancehall Artiste	Shatta Wale	Won	
2017	People's Celebrity Awards	Favourite Male Musician	Shatta Wale	Won	
2017	People's Celebrity Awards	Ultimate People's Celebrity	Shatta Wale	Won	
2017	4Syte Music Video Awards	Most Popular Video	Shatta Wale- Taking Over	Won	
2017	Soundcity MVP Awards Festival	Best Male MVP	Shatta Wale	Nominated	
2017	Soundcity MVP Awards Festival	African Artiste of the Year	Shatta Wale	Nominated	
2017	Soundcity MVP Awards Festival	Digital Artiste of the Year	Himself	Nominated	
2018	3 Music Awards	Song of the Year	Ayoo	Won	
2018	3 Music Awards	Song Writer of the Year	Shatta Wale	Won	
2018	3 Music Awards	Facebook Star of the Year	Shatta Wale	Won	
2018	3 Music Awards	Male Act of the Year	Shatta Wale	Won	
2018	Ghana Music Awards	Best Collaboration of the Year	Taking Over	Won	
2018	Ghana Music Awards	Dancehall Artiste of the Year	Shatta Wale	Nominated	
2018	Ghana Music Awards	Dancehall Song of the Year	Dem Confuse	Nominated	
2018	Ghana Music Awards	Hiplife Song of the Year	Ayoo	Nominated	
2018	Ghana Music Awards	Song of the Year	Taking Over	Nominated	
2018	African Entertainment Awards (US)	Best Dancehall Act	Shatta Wale	Won	
2018	Ghana Entertainment Awards (US)	Best Song	Taking Over	Won	
2018	Ghana Entertainment Awards (US)	Best Collaboration	Taking Over	Won	
2018	Ghana Entertainment Awards (US)	Best Entertainer	Shatta Wale	Won	
2018	Ghana Entertainment Awards (US)	Best Reggae/Dancehall Act	Shatta Wale	Nominated	
2019	Ugandan Music Excellence Awards	Best African Music Video	Shatta Wale	Won	
2019	3 Music Awards	Viral Song of the Year	Shatta Wale-Gringo	Won	
2019	3 Music Awards	Highlife Song of the Year	Shatta Wale	Nominated	
2019	3 Music Awards	Reggae Dancehall Song of the Year	Shatta Wale-Gringo	Won	
2019	3 Music Awards	Digital Artiste of the Year	Shatta Wale	Won	
2019	3 Music Awards	Fan Army of the Year	Shatta movement-Shatta Wale	Won	
2019	3 Music Awards	Reggae Dancehall Act of the Year	Shatta Wale	Won	
2019	3 Music Awards	Music Video of the Year	Shatta Wale-Gringo	Won	
2019	3 Music Awards	Album of the Year	Shatta Wale-Reign Album	Nominated	
2019	3 Music Awards	Song of the Year	Shatta Wale-My Level	Won	
2019	3 Music Awards	Male Act of the Year	Shatta Wale	Won	
2019	Vodafone Ghana Music Awards	Artiste of the Year	Shatta Wale	Pending	
2019	Vodafone Ghana Music Awards	Highlife Song of the Year	Shatta Wale-My Level	Won	
2019	Vodafone Ghana Music Awards	Reggae Dancehall Song of the Year	Shatta Wale-Gringo	Won	
2019	Vodafone Ghana Music Awards	Afro Pop Song of the Year	Shatta Wale – Thunder Fire feat SM Militants	Nominated	
2019	Vodafone Ghana Music Awards	Reggae Dancehall Artiste of the Year	Shatta Wale	Nominated	
2019	Vodafone Ghana Music Awards	Best Video of the Year	Shatta Wale – Gringo (Dir Sesan)	Nominated	
2019	Vodafone Ghana Music Awards	Vodafone Most Popular Song of the Year	Shatta Wale-My Level	Pending	
2019	Vodafone Ghana Music Awards	Album of the Year	Shatta Wale-Reign Album	Nominated	
2019	Vodafone Ghana Music Awards	Best African Collaboration	Shatta Wale ft Olamide	Nominated	
2019	Vodafone Ghana Music Awards	Artiste of the Decade	Shatta Wale	Nominated	
2019	Ghana Music Awards UK	Reggae Dancehall Artist of the Year	Himself	Won	
2019	Ghana Music Awards UK	Popular Song of the Year	"My Level"	Won	
