= List of Ghanaians =

This list of notable Ghanaians includes people who were born in Ghana and people who are of Ghanaian ancestry, who are significantly notable for their life and/or work.

== University academics ==
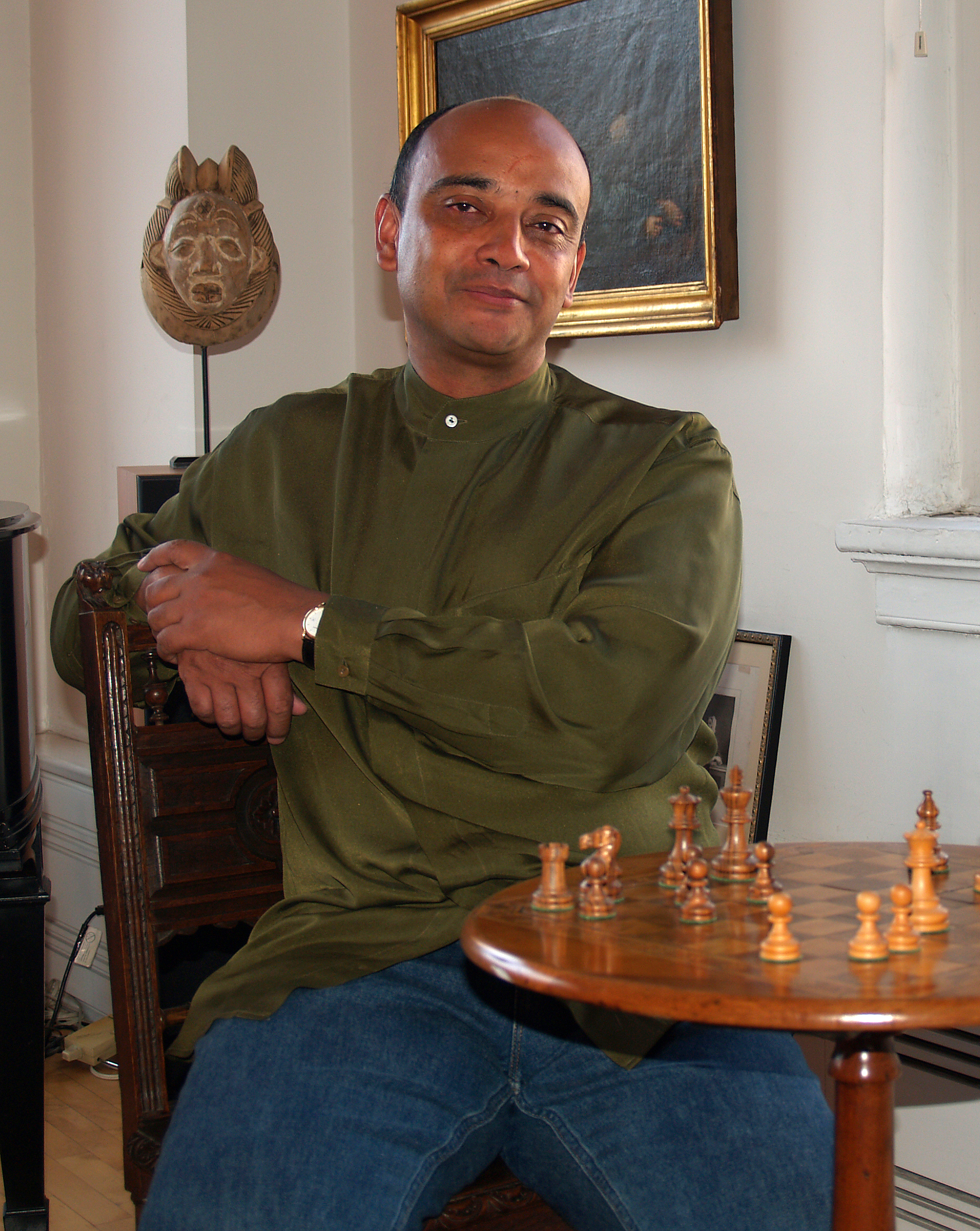
Kwame Anthony Appiah

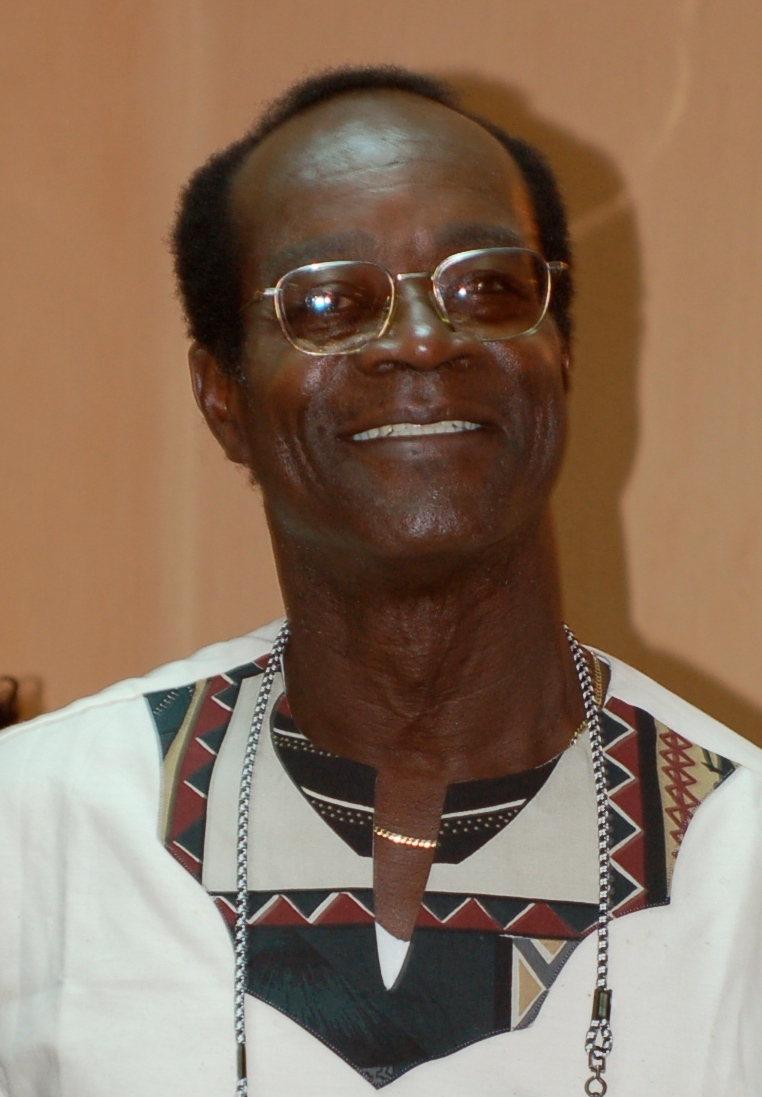
George Ayittey

- Mohammed-Sani Abdulai - president of Lakeside University College
- William Emmanuel Abraham - Philosopher - Author and Vice-Chancellor of the University of Ghana
- Kwasi Kwarfo Adarkwa - Academic and the past Vice Chancellor of the Kwame Nkrumah University of Science and Technology
- James Emman Kwegyir Aggrey - Intellectual, missionary and teacher
- Francis Allotey - Mathematical physicist
- Joseph Amenowode - Academic and politician
- Aba Andam - Nuclear physicist and lecturer at Kwame Nkrumah University of Science and Technology
- Kwesi Akwansah Andam - Author - civil engineer and former Vice Chancellor of Kwame Nkrumah University of Science and Technology
- Kwame Anthony Appiah - Philosopher and novelist
- George Ayittey - Economist and author
- Robert Patrick Baffour - Academic - mechanical engineer and First Vice Chancellor of the Kwame Nkrumah University of Science and Technology
- Nathaniel Boso - Academic and international marketing strategist
- George C. Clerk - Botanist
- Nicholas T. Clerk - Academic public administrator and Presbyterian Minister
- Philip Gbeho - Teacher and composer of the Ghana National Anthem
- Akua Kuenyehia - Academic and Lawyer who served as Judge of the International Criminal Court and former Dean of the Faculty of Law University of Ghana
- Fred McBagonluri - Academic - author and inventor
- Daniel Asua Wubah - Academic and President of Millersville University

== Arts ==
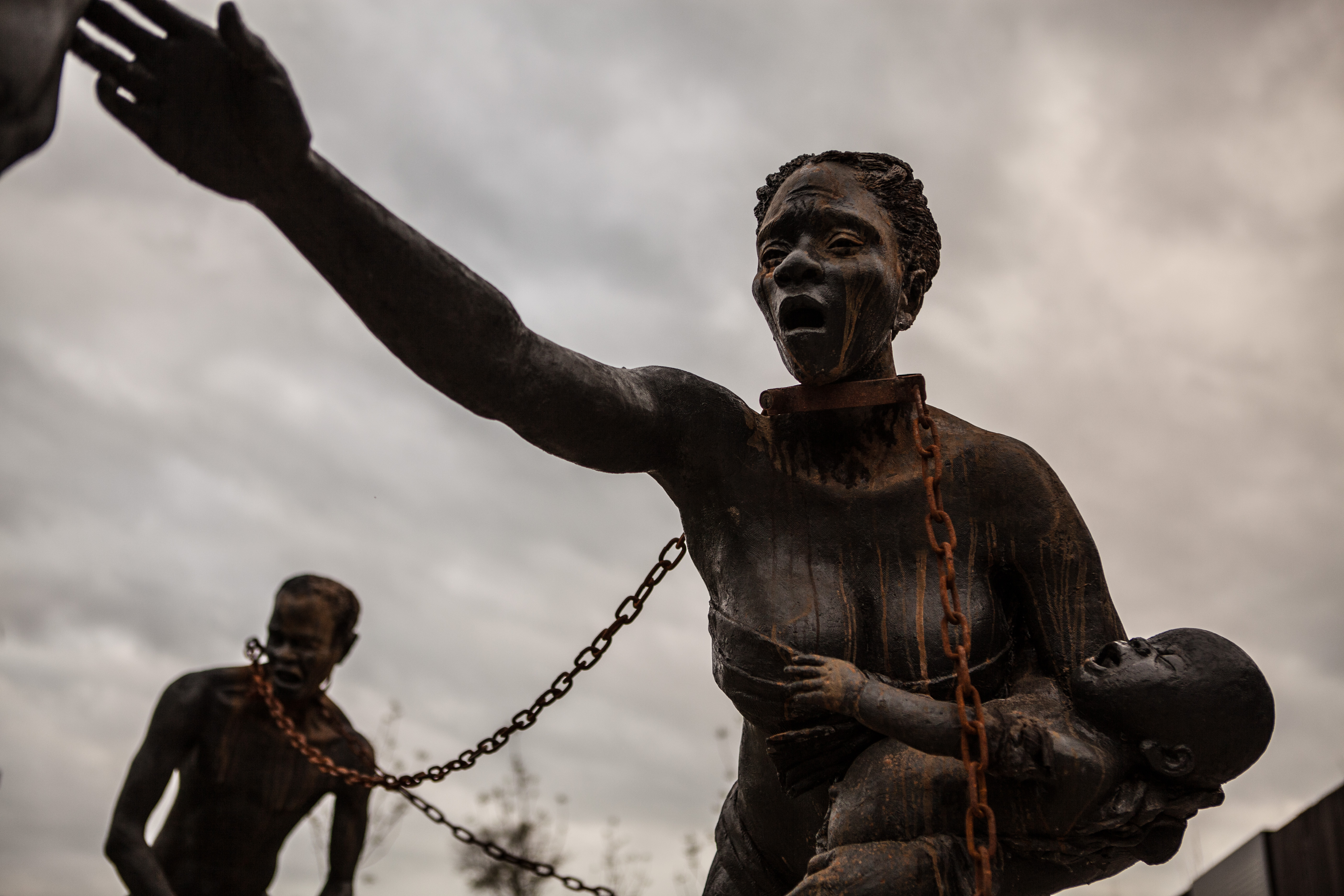
Nkyinkim by Kwame Akoto-Bamfo at the National Memorial for Peace and Justice in Montgomery, Alabama.

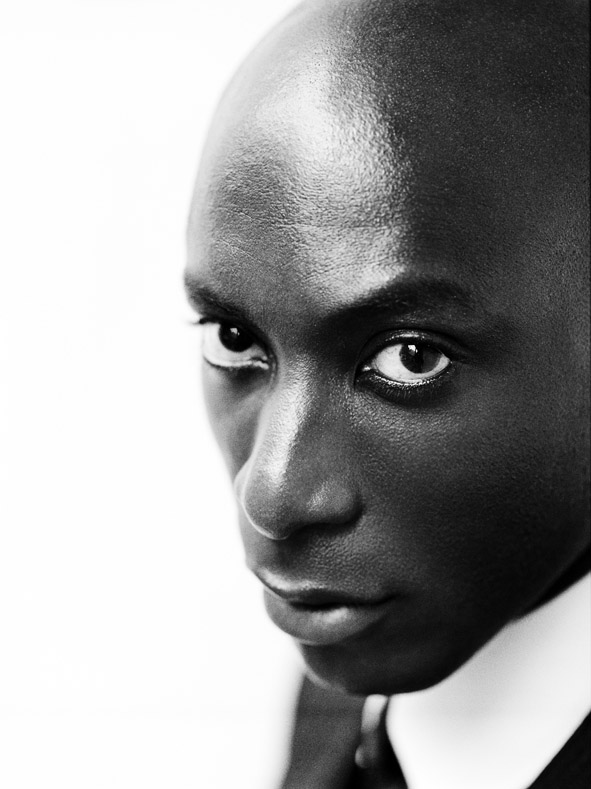
Ozwald Boateng

=== Sculpture and painting ===
- Bright Tetteh Ackwerh - Sculptor
- Ben Agbee - Artist
- Eric Adjetey Anang - Sculptor
- El Anatsui - Sculptor
- Owusu-Ankomah - Painter
- Nana Oforiatta Ayim - Art historian, curator, filmmaker, writer
- Kwame Akoto-Bamfo - Sculptor
- Serge Attukwei Clottey - Artist
- James Cudjoe - Painter
- Godfried Donkor - Painter and mixed-media artist
- Kimathi Donkor - Painter
- Ablade Glover - Painter
- Amon Kotei - Artist and designer of the coat of arms of Ghana
- Wiz Kudowor - Artist
- Theodosia Okoh - Artist and designer of the Flag of Ghana
- Rikki Wemega-Kwawu - Artist
- Lynette Yiadom-Boakye - Painter

=== Architecture ===
- David Adjaye - Architect
- Theodore S. Clerk - Urban planner and first Ghanaian professionally certified architect
- Elsie Owusu - Founding chair of the Society of Black Architects
- Harry Sawyerr - Architect

=== Dance ===
- Obo Addy - Drummer and dancer

=== Fashion ===
- Joyce Ababio - Fashion designer and educator
- Virgil Abloh - Fashion designer
- Adwoa Aboah - Supermodel
- Nana Akua Addo - Model and film producer/actress
- Kofi Ansah - Fashion designer
- Chloe Asaam - Fashion designer and sustainable fashion advocate
- Aisha Ayensu - Fashion designer and founder of Christie Brown
- Ozwald Boateng - Fashion designer
- Edward Enninful - Former Editor-in-Chief of British Vogue magazine
- Hilda Akua Frimpong - Model
- Joe Casely-Hayford - Fashion designer
- Akpene Diata Hoggar - Miss Universe Ghana, and Activist
- Claudia Lumor - Fashion magazine publisher and fashion show producer
- Charlotte Mensah - Hairstylist founder of hair lounge
- Ruth Quarshie - Model and winner of Miss Universe Ghana 2017
- Sam Sarpong - Supermodel
- Kate Tachie-Menson - Model

=== Photography ===
- Felicia Abban - Ghana's first female professional photographer
- Philip Kwame Apagya - Photographer
- James Barnor - Hon. FRPS Photographer and Holder of The Order Of The Volta
- Prince Gyasi - Visual artist and founder of non-profit Boxedkids

== Business ==
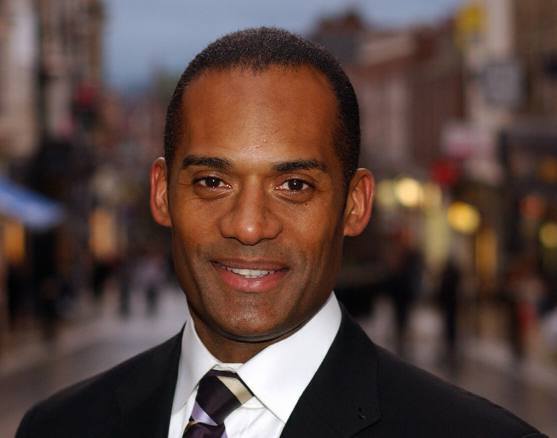
Adam Afriyie

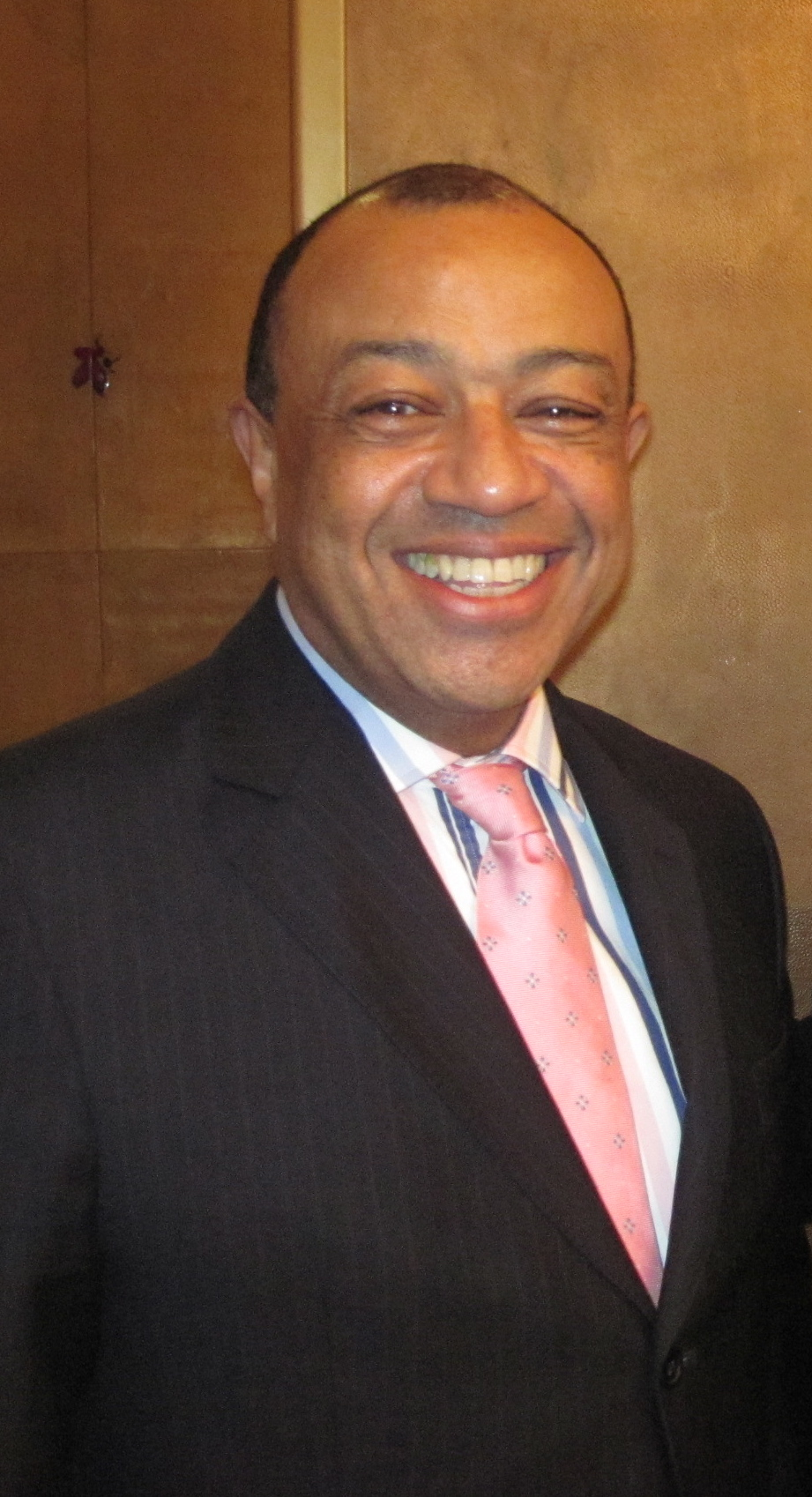
Lord Paul Boateng

- Adam Afriyie - Former member of parliament for Windsor and member of the British Conservative Party
- George Afriyie - Businessman and owner/President of Ghanaian club Planners Athletic Club
- Roland Agambire - Entrepreneur and former chief executive officer of Agams Holdings and the chairman and chief executive officer of the information and communications technology company Rlg Communications
- Prince Kofi Amoabeng - Former Military Officer and businessman
- Abena Amoah - Deputy Managing Director of the Ghana Stock Exchange.
- K. Y. Amoako - International civil servant for the United Nations and businessman
- Anne Amuzu - Computer scientist and co-founder of technology company Nandimobile Limited
- Joyce Aryee - Businesswoman and politician
- Yvette Adounvo Atekpe - Businesswoman and Regional Managing Director of Internet Solutions
- Marufatu Abiola Bawuah - Managing director/chief executive officer of United Bank for Africa
- Lord Paul Boateng - British Labour Party politician and the UK's first black cabinet minister
- Bernice Dapaah - Social entrepreneur and founder/chief executive officer of the Ghana Bamboo Bike Initiative
- Dzigbordi Kwaku-Dosoo - Founder and CEO of DCG Consulting Group and Allure Africa
- Sam E. Jonah - Businessman
- Patricia Obo-Nai - Engineer and the first Ghanaian to become chief executive officer of Vodafone Ghana
- Kate Quartey-Papafio - Businesswoman
- Georgette Barnes Sakyi-Addo - Businesswoman
- Akua Sarpong-Ayisa - Entrepreneur and founder of the floral company "Unique Floral"
- Winnifred Selby - social entrepreneur/president of the EPF Educational Empowerment Initiative and co-founder of the Ghana Bamboo Bike Initiative
- J. K. Siaw - Industrialist/philanthropist and establisher of Tata Brewery Ltd
- Elizabeth Wyns-Dogbe - Chartered insurer and an associate member of The Chartered Insurance Institute UK
- Adowarim Lugu Zuri - Founder and manager of Wazuri Ghana Limited

== Other educators ==
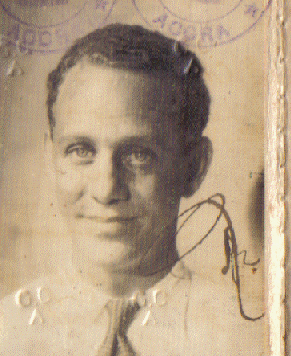
Beattie Casely-Hayford

- Stephen Adei - Educationist, writer, economist and motivational speaker
- Gottlieb Ababio Adom - Teacher, journalist and Church Minister
- James Emman Kwegyir Aggrey - Intellectual, Missionary, and teacher
- Richard Appiah Akoto - Educationalist
- Francis Allotey - Mathematical physicist
- Kofi Annan - Former secretary-general of the United Nations, Nobel peace prize winner and chancellor of the University of Ghana
- Ernest Aryeetey - Emeritus Professor at the Institute of Statistical, Social and Economic Research (ISSER), Former Secretary-General of the African Research Universities Alliance (ARUA) and vice-chancellor of the University of Ghana
- Kofi Awoonor - Professor and diplomat
- Patrick Awuah - Founder and president of Ashesi University
- Edward S. Ayensu - Economist, scientist and former chairman of the Council for Scientific and Industrial Research
- George Ayittey - Economist, author, professor and President of the Free Africa Foundation
- Emmanuel Yaw Benneh - Law Professor
- Kwesi Botchwey - Professor and lawyer
- Beattie Casely-Hayford - Engineer
- Gus Casely-Hayford - Curator and cultural historian
- Alexander Worthy Clerk - Missionary and teacher
- Carl Henry Clerk - Teacher and Church Minister
- Jane E. Clerk - Teacher and education administrator
- Nicholas Timothy Clerk - Missionary and Clergyman
- Priscilla Kolibea Mante - Neuropharmacologist, researcher and lecturer from Kwame Nkrumah University of Science and Technology
- John Atta Mills - Former president of the Fourth Republic of Ghana and university professor of law
- Marian Asantewah Nkansah - Ghana Academy of Arts and Sciences recipient and environmental chemist
- Mavis Owureku-Asare - Food scientist and CEO of Impact Food Hub
- Percy Sackey - Teacher

== Judiciary ==
- Mabel Agyemang - Chief Justice of the Supreme court of The Gambia
- Daniel Francis Annan - Judge
- Joyce Bamford-Addo - Judge and barrister
- Amanda Akuokor Clinton - C.E.O of Bitcoin Exchange Africa and the founding partner of the law office of Clinton Consultancy
- V. C. R. A. C. Crabbe - Former Judge of the Ghana Supreme Court
- Samuel Azu Crabbe - Barrister and former 5th Chief of Justice of the republic of Ghana
- Jones Dotse - Former supreme court judge of Ghana and The Gambia
- Cynthia Lamptey - Lawyer and public servant, former Director of Public Prosecutions
- Thomas Mensah (lawyer) - Judge and President of Permanent Court of Arbitration
- Sandra Opoku - Lawyer and first female Director of Tema Port
- Emmanuel Charles Quist - Barrister and judge, first African Speaker of the Gold Coast legislative assembly
- Georgina Theodora Wood - First female Chief Justice of Ghana

== Diplomats ==
- Elizabeth Adjei
- Kofi Annan - Former secretary-general of the United Nations, Nobel peace prize winner and chancellor of the University of Ghana
- K. B. Asante
- Elsie Addo Awadzi
- Paul Boateng
- Mohamed Ibn Chambas
- Pauline M. Clerk
- Anita Kiki Gbeho
- Akua Kuenyehia
- Amon Nikoi
- Charlotte Osei
- Nathan Quao
- Genevieve Delali Tsegah

== Film actors and directors ==
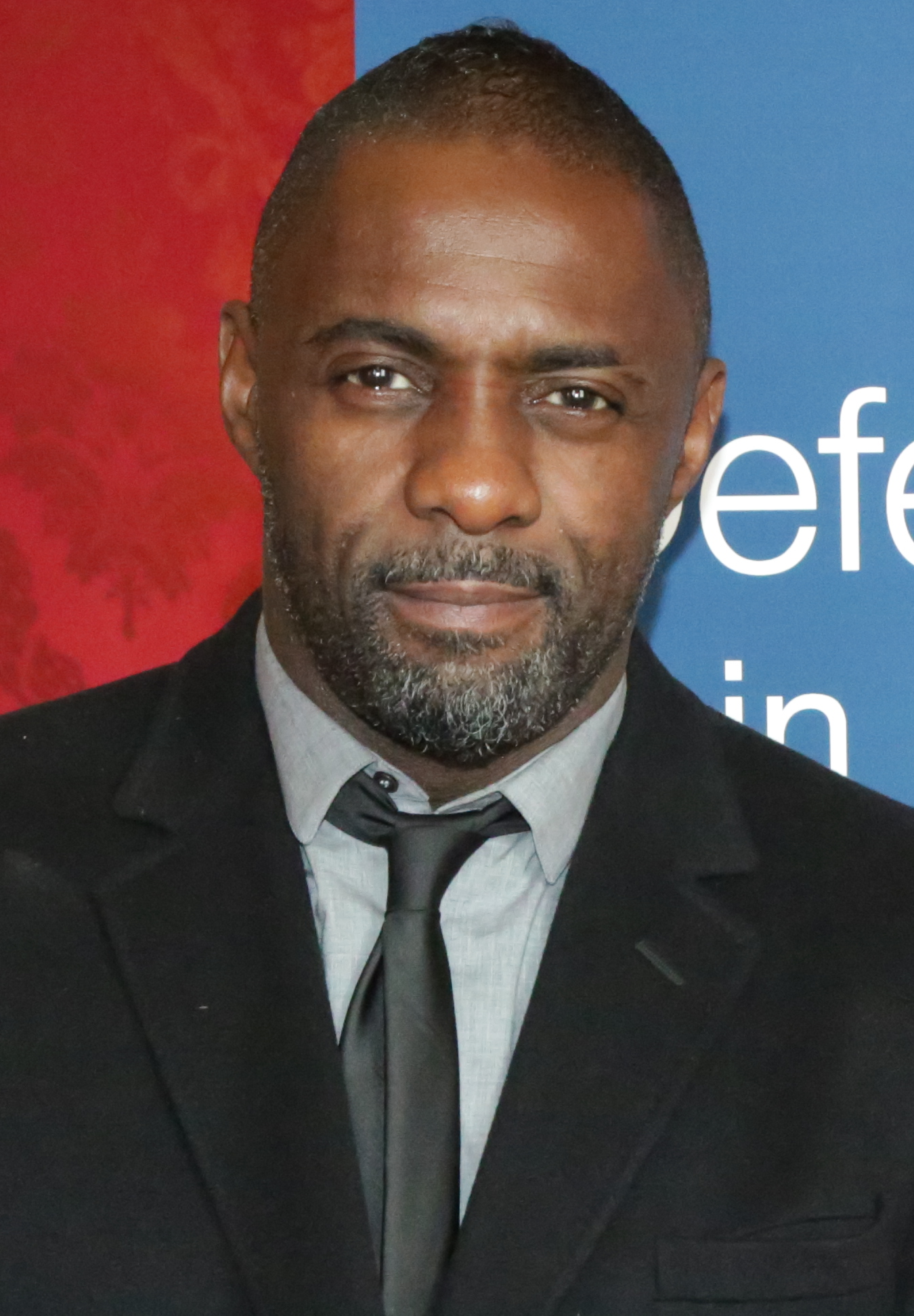
Idris Elba

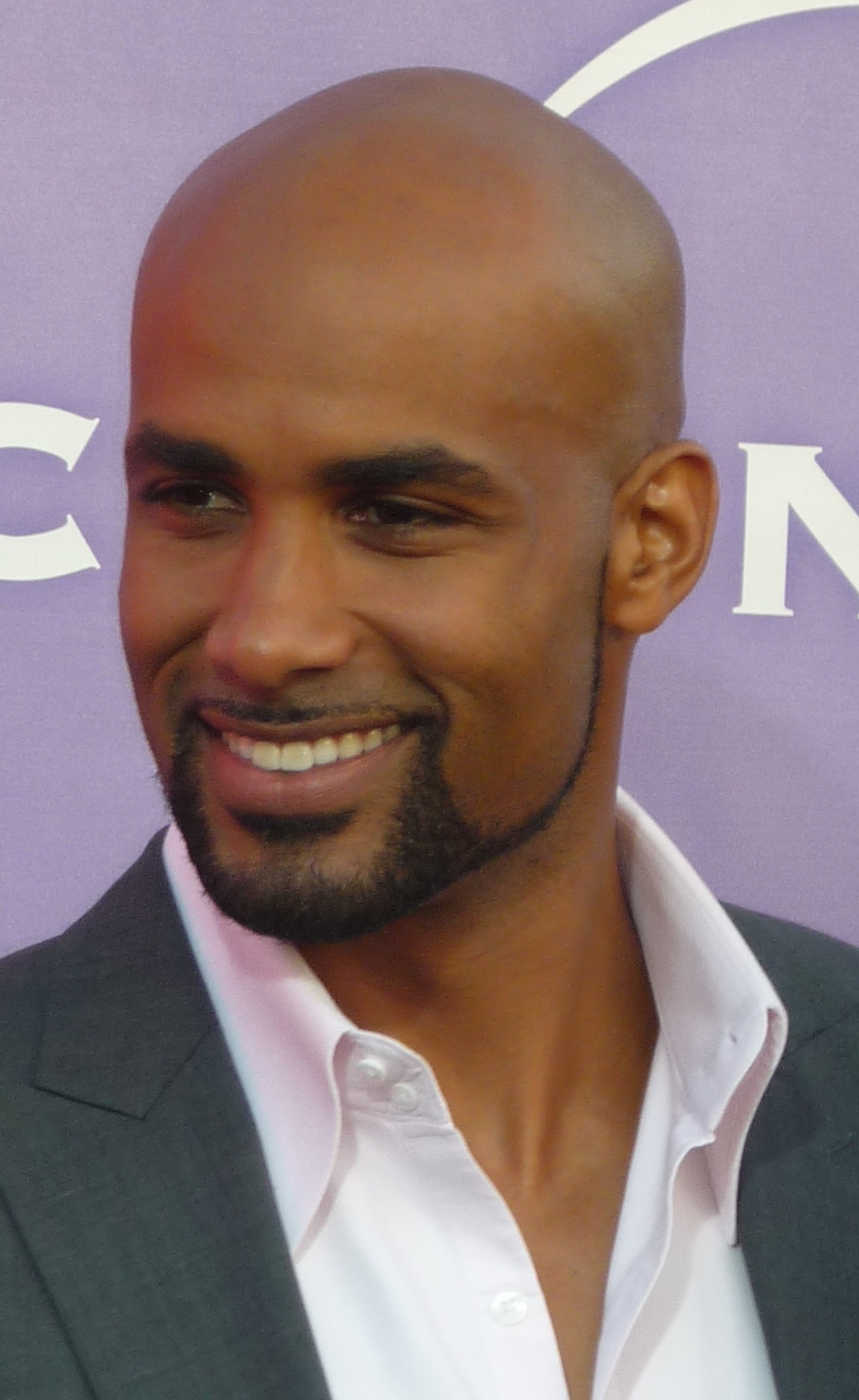
Boris Kodjoe

- Ama K. Abebrese
- Kofi Adjorlolo
- Freema Agyeman, actress
- John Akomfrah, film director and screenwriter
- Mac Jordan Amartey
- Jackie Appiah, actress
- Amma Asante, Ghanaian-British film writer and director
- Chris Attoh, actor
- Diaana Babnicova, actress
- Yaba Badoe, filmmaker and writer
- Clara Amoateng Benson
- Thelma Buabeng
- Nadia Buhari, actress
- Akosua Busia, actress
- Paul Danquah, Ghanaian-British actor
- Michael Dapaah
- Leila Djansi
- David Dontoh
- Joselyn Dumas, actress
- John Dumelo, actor, politician
- Idris Elba, actor
- Nii Odartei Evans, actor, producer, voiceover artist
- Boris Kodjoe, actor
- Dayan Kodua
- Anita Kuma
- Peter Mensah, actor
- Majid Michel, actor
- Yvonne Nelson, actress
- Sika Osei
- Nii Kwate Owoo
- Kwesi Owusu
- Kwame Owusu-Ansah
- Hugh Quarshie, actor
- Socrate Safo, director
- Bob Santo
- Hailliote Sumney
- Van Vicker, actor
- Zynnell Zuh

=== Comedians ===
- Kofi Adu (Agya Koo), actor and comedian
- Michael Blackson, comedian
- Abusuapanin Judas, actor and comedian
- Jacinta Ocansey, comedian
- Bob Santo, actor and comedian

== Journalists ==
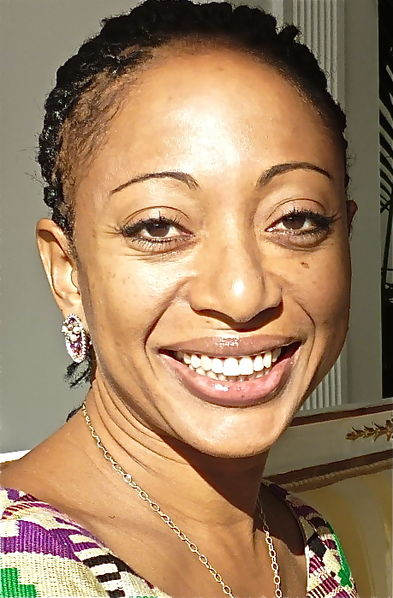
Samia Nkrumah

- Jemila Abdulai
- Edward Adeti, journalist
- David Ampofo
- Nana Aba Anamoah, journalist
- Anas Aremeyaw Anas, journalist
- Nathaniel Attoh, journalist
- Bernard Avle, journalist
- Manasseh Azure Awuni, journalist
- Kweku Baako Jnr, journalist
- Juliet Bawuah
- Kojo Akoto Boateng, journalist
- Seth Kwame Boateng, journalist
- Seth J. Bokpe, journalist
- Robert Nii Arday Clegg, journalist
- Solomon Joojo Cobbinah, investigative journalist
- Akua Sena Dansua, journalist
- Ameyaw Debrah, blogger and journalist
- Emmanuel K. Dogbevi, journalist
- Kofi Adu Domfeh
- Komla Dumor, journalist
- Cameron Duodu, journalist, broadcaster, writer
- Ekow Eshun, journalist and broadcaster
- Natalie Fort, journalist
- Afua Hirsch, journalist
- Akpene Diata Hoggar, blogger
- Ahmed Hussein-Suale, investigative journalist
- Mustapha Inusah, a.k.a. Attractive Mustapha - journalist
- Nana Kwadwo Jantuah, journalist
- Isaac Kaledzi, journalist
- Kwami Sefa Kayi, journalist
- Asare Konadu
- Anita Kuma
- Edward Oppong Marfo, journalist
- Kent Mensah, journalist
- Emma Morrison
- Gamal Nkrumah, journalist, Pan-Africanist and editor
- Samia Nkrumah, journalist
- Pearl Akanya Ofori, journalist
- Jessica Opare-Saforo
- Brigitte Perenyi
- Kwaku Sakyi-Addo, journalist

== Military figures ==
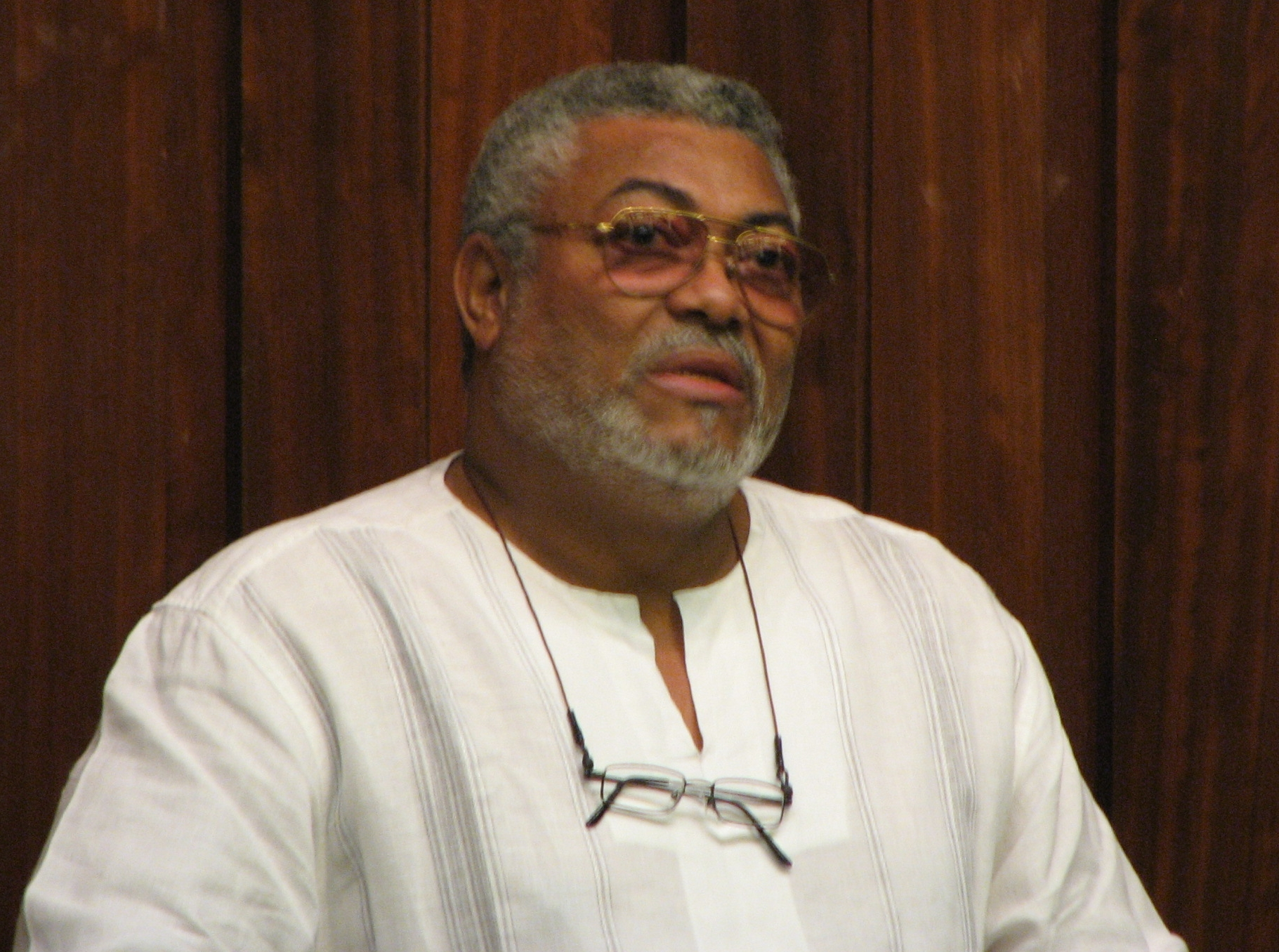
Jerry John Rawlings

- Sarah Aba-Afari, first woman in the police service in both Ghana and Africa to earn a PhD
- Akwasi Afrifa, soldier and former politician and head of state of Ghana
- Native Officer Ali, Native Officer of the Gold Coast Constabulary and Head of the Hausa Community.
- Joseph Arthur Ankrah, soldier and second head of state of Ghana
- David Animle Hansen, Ghana Navy Chief of Naval Staff
- Emmanuel Kwasi Kotoka, lieutenant general; commissioned as a lieutenant in 1954 and seconded to the British army on the Rhine
- Rosamond Asiamah Nkansah (born 1930), first Ghanaian policewoman
- Jerry Rawlings, former president of the Republic of Ghana and Ghana Air Force fighter pilot

== Physicians and surgeons ==
- Oblempong Nii Kojo Ababio V, dental surgeon and traditional ruler
- Nancy Abu-Bonsrah, neurosurgeon
- Beatrice Wiafe Addai, medical officer and surgeon
- Kwame Addo-Kufuor, medical doctor
- Raphael Armattoe, doctor, poet, politician
- E. A. Badoe
- John Bilson
- Kofi Boahene
- Ellen Boakye
- Peter Bossman, doctor
- Alexander A. Clerk, sleep medicine specialist and psychiatrist
- Matilda J. Clerk, physician
- Charles Odamtten Easmon, surgeon
- Emmanuel Evans-Anfom, physician and academic
- Kwabena Frimpong-Boateng, cardiothoracic surgeon
- Ernest James Hayford
- Afua Adwo Jectey Hesse
- Emmanuel A. Kissi
- Jacob Kwakye-Maafo, physician and surgeon
- Edward Mahama
- Frederick Nanka-Bruce
- David Ofori-Adjei
- Susan Ofori-Atta
- Benjamin Quartey-Papafio, first Ghanaian to obtain an MD degree
- Bernard Ribeiro, Baron Ribeiro, surgeon and former president of the Royal College of Surgeons of England
- Fred T. Sai, academic and family health physician

== Politics ==
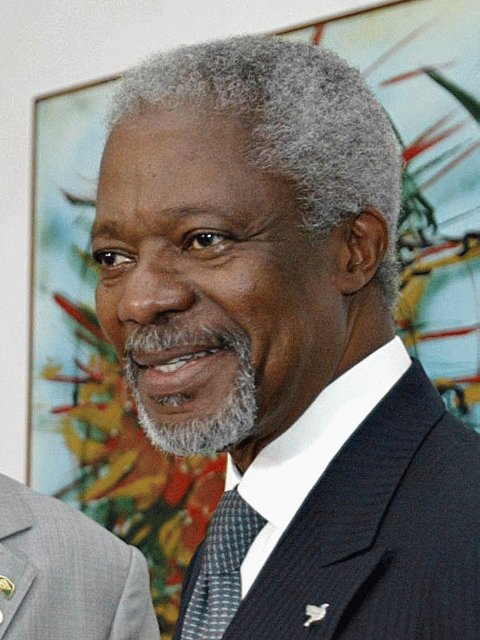
Kofi Annan

- K. Abaka-Quansah, former MP
- Ako Adjei, nationalist politician and one of The Big Six
- Felicia Adjei - Member of Parliament for Kintampo
- Justice Samuel Adjei - Former deputy Brong Ahafo Regional Minister
- Nana Ama Dokua Asiamah-Adjei - Former deputy minister of Trade & Industry of Ghana
- Akwasi Afrifa - Former president
- Adam Afriyie, British Conservative Party politician and businessman
- Edward Akufo-Addo, former president and one of The Big Six
- Nana Akufo-Addo, current president of the Republic of Ghana
- Reginald Reynolds Amponsah
- Joseph Arthur Ankrah, former president
- Kofi Annan, 7th UN Secretary-General
- Emelia Arthur - Former deputy Western Regional Minister
- San Nasamu Asabigi - Former deputy Northern Regional Minister
- William Ofori Atta, politician, founding member of the United Gold Coast Convention, one of The Big Six
- Kwadwo Baah-Wiredu, former MP and finance minister
- Prosper Douglas Bani, former chief of staff
- Albert Adu Boahen
- Lord Paul Boateng, British Labour Party politician, member of House of Lords, solicitor, barrister and businessman
- Peter Bossman, Slovenian politician
- Ama Bame Busia
- Kofi Abrefa Busia, prime minister and author
- J. B. Danquah, statesman, pan-Africanist, scholar, historian and one of The Big Six
- Obuobia Darko-Opoku
- Joyce Akoh Dei
- Ambrose Dery, MP and minister
- Victor Gbeho, diplomat
- J. E. Casely Hayford, journalist, author, lawyer, educator, and politician
- Haruna Iddrisu, MP and minister
- Abu Kasanbata
- John Kufuor, former president of Ghana, Global Ambassador against Hunger for UN World Food Programme (WFP)
- Ken Kwaku (born 1946), corporate governance expert
- Kwasi Kwarteng, British Conservative Party politician
- Fiifi Kwetey, MP and minister
- Alan John Kyerematen
- John Mahama
- Lucy Awuni Mbun
- Abena Durowaa Mensah
- Tina Gifty Mensah
- John Atta Mills, former president of the Republic of Ghana
- Mubarak Mohammed Muntaka
- Cynthia Mamle Morrison
- Janet Nabla
- Paa Kwesi Nduom
- Kojo Oppong Nkrumah, politician, journalist
- Justina Owusu–Banahene, Bono regional minister
- Kwame Nkrumah, founder of Pan-Africanism, leader of Ghana and its predecessor state, the Gold Coast and one of The Big Six
- Emmanuel Obetsebi-Lamptey, politician, one of the founders and leaders of the United Gold Coast Convention and one of The Big Six
- Jake Obetsebi-Lamptey
- Nii Amaa Ollennu, chairman of the Presidential Commission and acting president of Ghana during the Second Republic from 7 August 1970 to 31 August 1970
- Aaron Mike Oquaye
- Victor Owusu
- Nana Akua Owusu Afriyie
- Naana Eyiah Quansah
- Jerry Rawlings, former president
- Charles Wereko-Brobby

== Sports ==
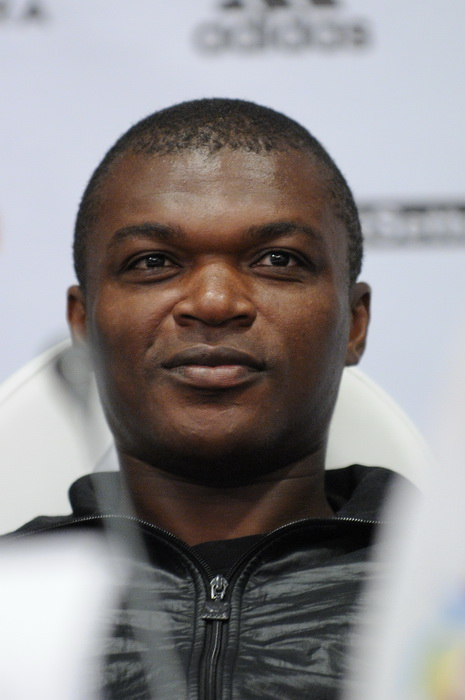
Marcel Desailly

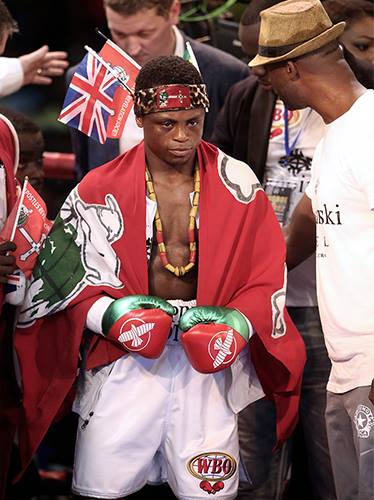
Isaac Dogboe

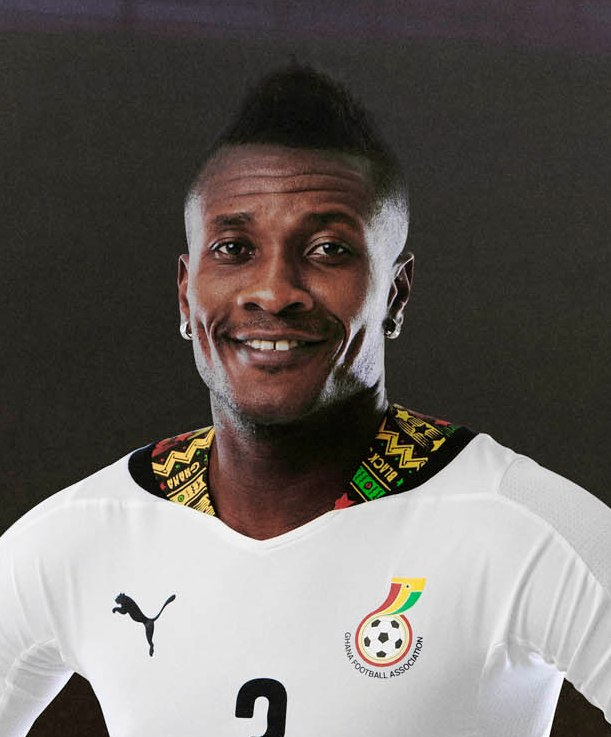
Asamoah Gyan

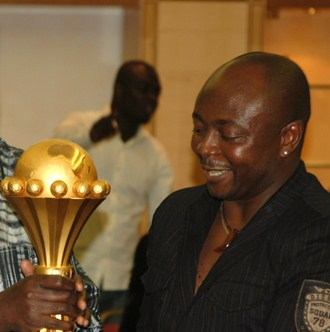
Abedi Pele

- Osumanu Adama - World champion boxer
- Azume Adams - Footballer
- Joseph Addai - American football player
- Freddy Adu - footballer
- Harry Aikines-Aryeetey - Sprinter, World, Commonwealth and European championship medalist
- Vida Anim - Athlete
- Ezekiel Ansah - American football player
- Stephen Appiah - Footballer, former captain of The Black Stars and Serie A, Supercoppa Italia winner
- Kwadwo Asamoah - Former footballer and Serie A, Supercoppa Italia winner
- Anita Asante - English Footballer
- André Ayew - Footballer, CAF player of the year and Coupe de la Ligue-Trophée des Champions winner, Ghana's most capped national team player
- Kwame Ayew - Footballer
- Jordan Ayew - Footballer, Ligue 1 - Coupe de la Ligue - Trophée des Champions winner
- Abdul Rahman Baba - Footballer
- Mario Balotelli - Footballer, UEFA Champions League - Premier League - Golden Boy winner
- Ben Bentil - Ghanaian basketball player
- Myron Boadu - Footballer
- Jérôme Boateng - Footballer, World Cup - UEFA Champions league - UEFA Club world cup - UEFA super cup winner
- Kevin-Prince Boateng - Footballer, Serie A - Supercoppa Italiana - La Liga winner
- Bernard Dong Bortey - Footballer
- Brian Brobbey - Footballer, Eredivisie - UEFA European Under-17 Championship winner - Ajax Player of the Year (Rinus Michels Award)
- Joshua Clottey - Former world champion boxer
- Memphis Depay - Footballer, La Liga - Supercopa de España - UEFA European Under-17 Championship winner
- Marcel Desailly - Footballer, captain of the France national football teamFIFA World Cup, UEFA Super Cup - UEFA champions league and FA Cup winner
- Isaac Dogboe - World champion boxer
- Jérémy Doku - Footballer, Premier League - FIFA Club World Cup winner
- Michael Essien - Footballer, CAF player of the year - Premier League - FA Cup - UEFA Champions League winner
- Habiba Atta Forson - Football administrator and former track and field athlete
- Timothy Fosu-Mensah - Footballer, UEFA Europa League winner
- Jeremie Frimpong - Footballer, Bundesliga - DFB-Pokal - DFL-Supercup winner
- Ignisious Gaisah - Athlete (Long jump), World indoor - World outdoor - Commonwealth Games and euro championships winner
- Hafiz Gariba - Footballer
- Kim Grant - Footballer
- Asamoah Gyan - Footballer AKA 'Baby Jets', African footballer of the year, Ghana all all-time top goalscorer and top African goalscorer in the history of the World Cup
- Callum Hudson-Odoi - Footballer, UEFA Champions League - UEFA Europa League - UEFA Super Cup - FIFA Club World Cup winner
- Juliana Kakraba - Footballer
- Kofi Kingston - Professional WWE wrestler
- Rev Osei Kofi - Reverend and AFCON 1965 Winner and joint top goalscorer
- Nana Yaw Konadu - World champion boxer
- Abigail Kwarteng - High jumper
- Lydia Mato - Middle-distance runner
- John Mensah - Footballer
- Nathan Mensah - Basketball center for Maccabi Tel Aviv
- Pops Mensah-Bonsu - Basketball player
- Azumah Nelson - World champion boxer
- Eddie Nketiah - Footballer, FA Cup, FA Community Shield, EFL Championship winner
- Kwame Nkrumah-Acheampong - Skier
- Winnifred Ntumi - Weightlifter
- David Oduro - Footballer
- John Paintsil - Footballer
- Thomas Partey, Footballer, La Liga - UEFA Super Cup - UEFA Europa League winner and Ghana player of the year
- Abedi Pele - Footballer, AFCON - UEFA Champions League - French Division 1 winner, African footballer of the year and AFCON golden ball winner
- Jarell Quansah - Footballer, Premier League and EFL cup winner
- Clement Quartey - Olympic boxing silver medalist
- Ike Quartey - Former world champion boxer
- Abdul-Rasheed Saminu Athlete(sprinter), Olympian and Ghana 100m record holder (9.86) and former world number 1
- Kofi Sarkodie - Footballer
- Charles Asampong Taylor - Footballer
- Danny Welbeck - Footballer, Premier League - Club World Cup - FA Cup winner
- Arthur Wharton - The first black professional association football player in the world
- Iñaki Williams - Footballer, La Liga African MVP - Copa del Rey - Supercopa de España winner
- Nico Williams - Footballer, UEFA Euro Championships - Copa del Rey winner
- Cadman Evans Yamoah - High Jumper, African games winner
- Rachel Yankey - Footballer
- Rose Yeboah - High Jumper, African games - African championships winner and NCAA T&F Championships runner up and Ghana's women's high jump record holder
- Tony Yeboah - Footballer, Former leeds United player

== Media ==
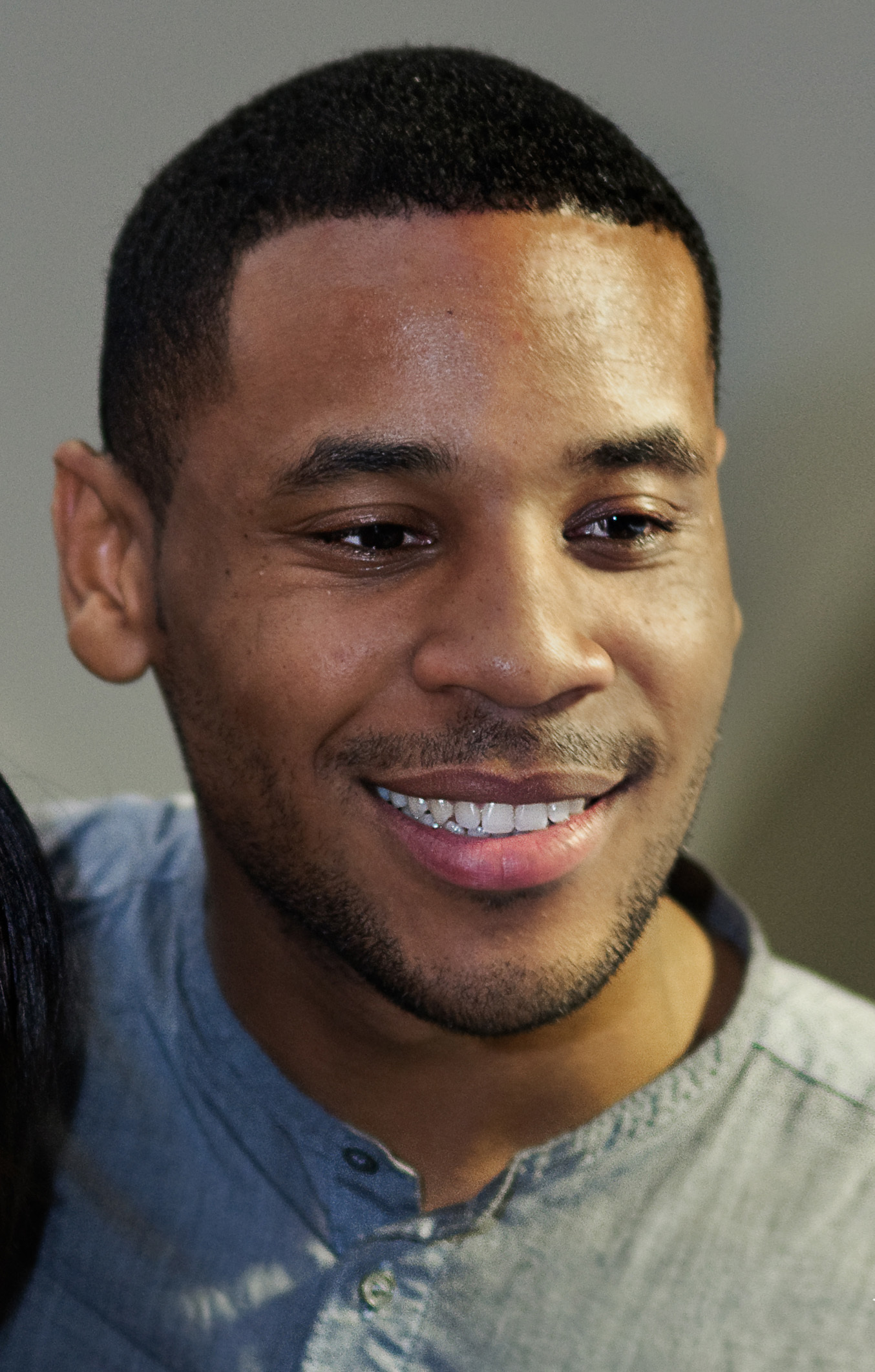
Reggie Yates

- Dzifa Affainie
- Nana Aba Anamoah, media personality
- Anas Aremeyaw Anas
- Terry Baddoo, journalist and television news presenter
- Margaret Busby, editor and publisher, founder of Allison & Busby
- Ameyaw Debrah, blogger, publisher celebrity blogger
- Marcel Desailly, pundit and former footballer
- Afua Hirsch, journalist and television news presenter
- Ras Kwame, DJ and radio presenter
- Ras Mubarak, media consultant
- Oral Ofori, digital storyteller
- Deborah Owusu-Bonsu, television presenter
- Amoaning Samuel, blogger and radio personality
- June Sarpong, television presenter
- Nana Yaa Serwaa Sarpong, media personality and entrepreneur
- Mahama Shaibu
- Alhassan Suhuyini, broadcast journalist
- Reggie Yates, television presenter
- Scofray Nana Yaw Yeboah, Golden City Business Magazine

== Writers and poets ==
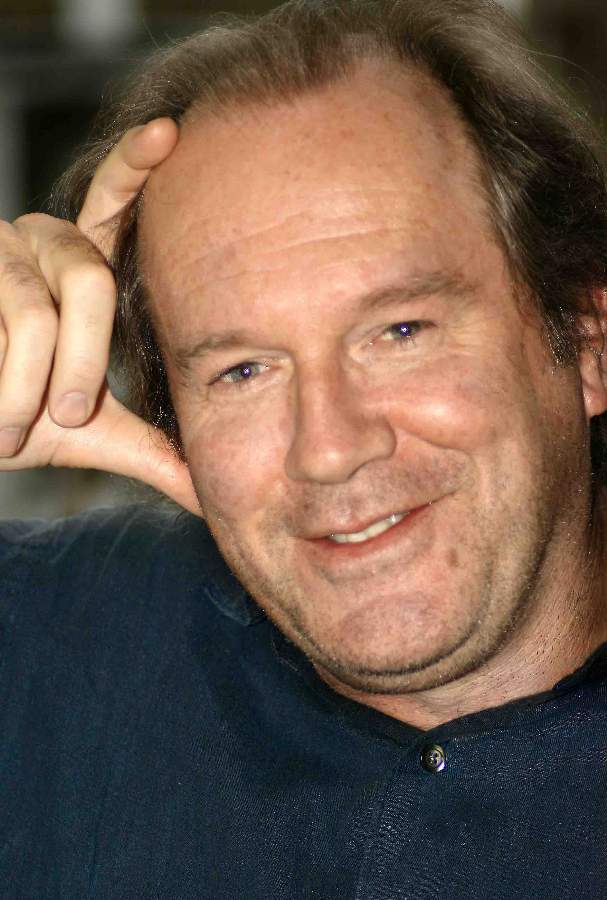
William Boyd

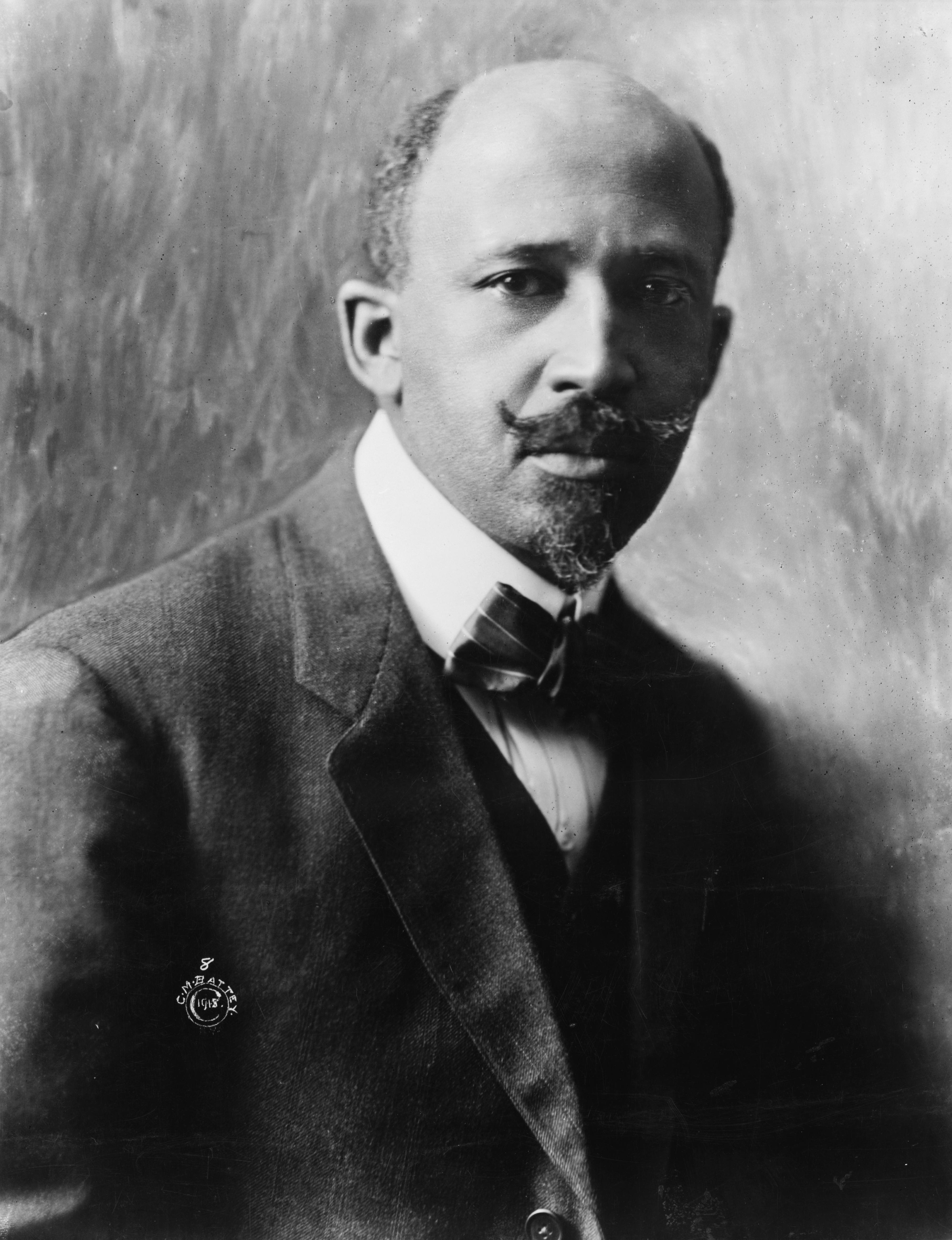
W. E. B. Du Bois

- Nana Achampong, novelist, poet and academic
- Ama Ata Aidoo, writer
- Mohammed Naseehu Ali, writer and musician
- Kofi Anyidoho, poet and academic
- Ayi Kwei Armah, novelist and social critic
- Ayesha Harruna Attah, writer
- Kofi Awoonor, poet and academic
- Empi Baryeh
- John Benibengor Blay
- William Boyd, novelist and screenwriter (born in Accra)
- Roseanne A. Brown, fantasy and Young adult fiction novelist
- Mabel Dove Danquah, journalist, political activist and creative writer
- Amma Darko, novelist
- Kwame Dawes, poet, editor and critic
- Joe de Graft, playwright and dramatist
- Portia Dery
- Amu Djoleto, poet and educator
- W. E. B. Du Bois, author, editor, sociologist, historian, civil rights activist and Pan-Africanist
- Kodwo Eshun, writer, theorist and filmmaker
- Yaa Gyasi, novelist
- Henneh Kyereh Kwaku, poet, editor, health communication scholar
- Kojo Laing, novelist
- Lesley Lokko, novelist and architect
- Atukwei Okai, poet, cultural activist and academic
- Francis Ernest Kobina Parkes, poet
- Nii Parkes, author, publisher and social commentator
- Taiye Selasi
- Efua Sutherland, playwright, poet and dramatist

== Musicians ==
- Akosua Agyapong
- Amaarae
- Amerado
- Kojo Antwi
- Kwesi Arthur
- Manon Bannerman
- Becca
- Lethal Bizzle
- Adeline Ama Buabeng
- C-Real
- Castro
- A. B. Crentsil
- Darkovibes
- Rocky Dawuni
- Amakye Dede
- Rocky Dawuni
- Donae'o
- E.L
- Efya
- Ethel Eshun
- Kuami Eugene
- Joey B
- Kojo Funds
- Fuse ODG
- Jay Ghartey
- Sherifa Gunu
- Bisa Kdei
- Kesse
- KiDi
- Kofi Kinaata
- KODA
- Pappy Kojo
- Daddy Lumba
- Medikal
- Meek Mill
- Moliy
- Vic Mensa
- Nayaah
- Koo Nimo
- Nii Okai
- Osibisa
- R2Bees
- Kojey Radical
- Dizzee Rascal
- RAYE
- Ebony Reigns
- Reggie Rockstone
- Bree Runway
- Samini
- Sarkodie
- Wendy Shay
- Black Sherif
- KOJOBLAK
- Kweku Smoke
- Esther Smith
- Stonebwoy
- Stormzy
- Sway
- Tempa T
- Trey La
- Tricky
- Shatta Wale
- Wan-O
- Guy Warren - a.k.a. Kofi Ghanaba
- Wiyaala
- Stevie Wonder
- Karter Zaher

== Gospel artists ==
- Joe Beecham
- Daughters of Glorious Jesus
- Piesie Esther
- Diana Hamilton
- Joe Mettle
- Helen Yawson

== Activists ==
- Juliana Dogbadzi
- Abena Dugan
- Stella Saaka
- Afi Azaratu Yakubu

== Inventors and innovators ==
- Alice Mamaga Akosua Amoako
- Alexander Anim-Mensah
- Herman Chinery-Hesse
- Ave Kludze
- Fred McBagonluri
- Thomas Mensah
- Bright Simons

== Others ==
- Efua Asibon
- Felicia Edem Attipoe
- Maudlyn Akosua Awuku, women's rights advocate
- Dr Ray Beat, record producer and sound engineer
- Harriet Bruce-Annan (born 1965), humanitarian
- John Collins, UK born-Ghanaian guitarist, harmonica player and percussionist
- Daniel Yaw Domelevo, Auditor-General of Ghana
- Ruth Ama Gyan-Darkwa
- Ama Hemmah
- Eva Mends, economist
- Molly Germaine Prempeh
- Scofray Nana Yaw Yeboah, transformational coach, mBIT Master Coach, corporate trainer, consultant, author, and columnist.
- DJ Zel
- Etika, YouTuber & Streamer

== See also ==
- Ghanaian Americans
- Ghanaians in the United Kingdom
- Gold Coast Euro-Africans
- White Ghanaian
- List of historical Ghanaian traditional rulers
- List of Ghanaian actors
- List of Ghanaian filmmakers
- List of Ghanaian musicians
- List of writers from Ghana
