= Richard Appiah Akoto =

Ghanaian educationist

- Other name: Owura Kwadwo Hottish
- Education: UNICAF University (scholarship, 2018)
- Occupations: Educationist, ICT teacher
- Employer: Betenase M/A Junior High School
- Known for: Teaching ICT without computers; viral blackboard lesson (2019)

Richard Appiah Akoto (also nicknamed Owura Kwadwo Hottish), is a Ghanaian educationist at Betenase M/A Junior High School who received attention for his innovative approach for teaching students Information and Communications Technology (ICT) without a computer.

In 2019, he shared of photo of himself on Facebook sketching the features of Microsoft Word on a blackboard to teach students in his class that went viral highlighting issues with the Ghanaian educational system. Since the event, Akoto's school have been given financial and technology support, particularly from Microsoft, and from others around the world. Akoto has spoken at global conferences on the challenges teachers face teaching ICT in the Ghanaian educational system.

== Career life ==
He is an ICT teacher at Betenase M/A Junior High School in the town of Sekyedomase, which is about two and half hours drive from Kumasi, Ghana. He has been at post in the school for 6 years, and was 33 at the time of the photo. In September 2018, he was given a full scholarship to pursue a master's degree in education with UNICAF University.

== Microsoft intervention ==
His photo caught the attention of global tech entrepreneur and the CEO of Apps Tech, Rebecca Enonchong who tweeted it to Microsoft after which Microsoft pledged to support his students with computers and enroll him in the Microsoft MCE program. At the Microsoft education exchange organised in Singapore, he was given a standing ovation by hundreds of participants.

== Donations ==
Donations of laptops started pouring in from Microsoft, individuals and organizations for his school. An IT laboratory was also built for the school.
