= Amoaning Samuel =

Ghanaian blogger and radio personality

Barimah Amoaning Samuel
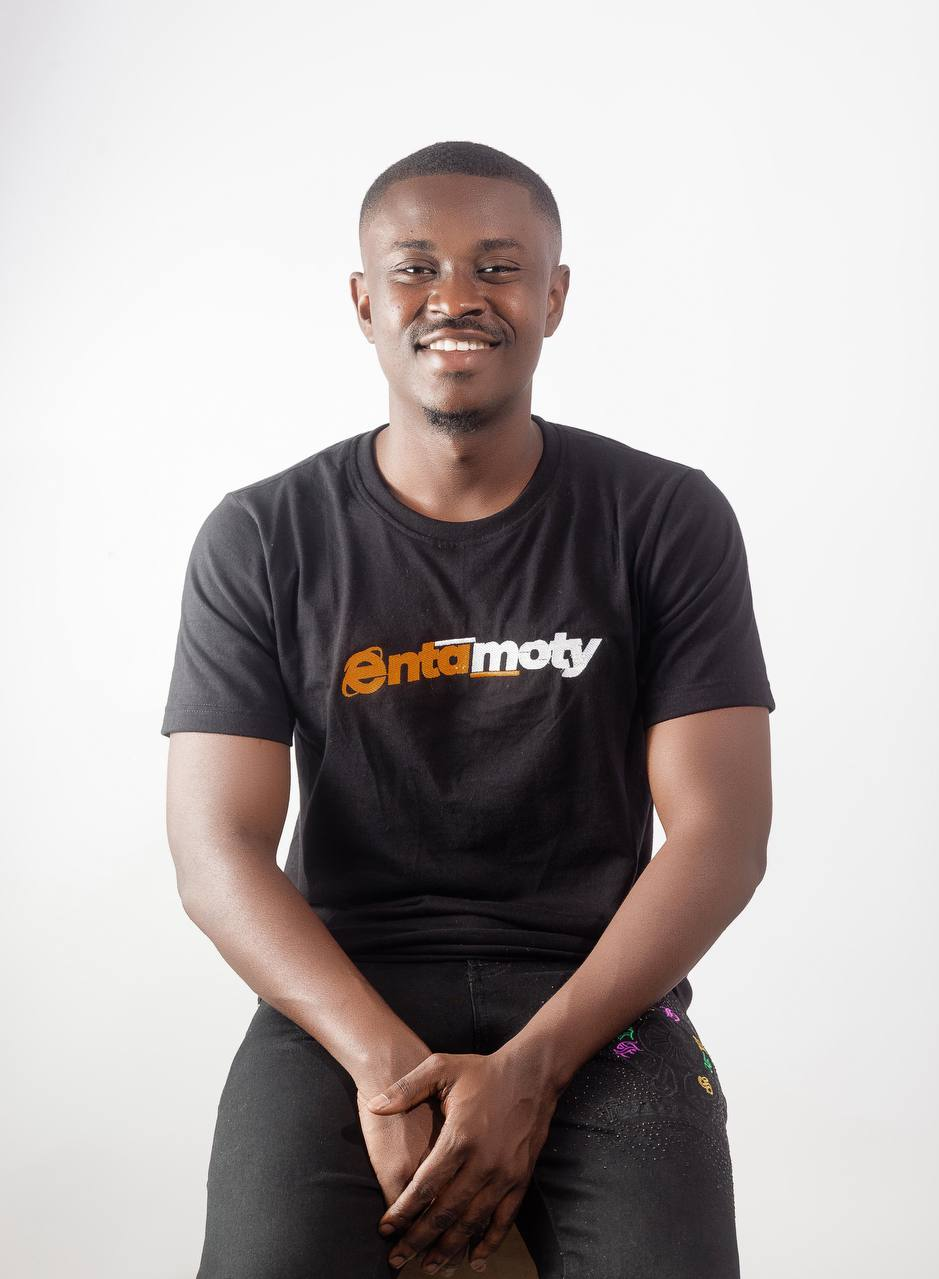
- Samuel Amoaning wearing Entamoty Media merchandis
- Born: Amoaning Samuel; 10 June 1995 (age 31)
- Education: Ghana Media School
- Career
- Show: Entamoty Live
- Station: Class FM
- Network: 91.3 FM
- Country: Ghana

Barimah Amoaning Samuel is a Ghanaian blogger and radio personality. He was the host of Entamoty Live on Class FM in Accra.

== Career ==
Amoaning Samuel was born in the Central Region of Ghana. He studied Broadcast Journalism at the Ghana Media School and is the founder of Entamoty Media Limited.

As a radio personality, Amoaning highlighted the dangers of social vices, including revenge porn and drug abuse. His advocacy against revenge porn includes a push towards the criminalization of the act by the lawmakers of Ghana. Joining the fight against drug abuse, he has been reported on different media championing a call for ban on the use of Tramadol.

In 2021, Amoaning started the Zeepay YT Creators Festival in collaboration with ICS Africa and as part of the Government of Ghana's Beyond the Return campaign. The initiative developed further to equip female creators and youth with digital skills to close Ghana's unemployment rate gap.

== Recognition ==
In 2018, Barimah was voted among the top 50 most influential bloggers in Ghana; an annual ranking organised by Avance Media, a Ghanaian media and public relations agency. He was one of 18 speakers at the TEDxAccra series of African thought-leadership events dubbed Africa Dialogues in 2017.

In 2019, Barimah was nominated for both Male Entrepreneur and Overall Entrepreneur of the year at the Achievers Summit and Awards. He also emerged winner of the popular vote for the Blogger of the Year at the Social Media and Entertainment Awards in July 2019.

In 2020, Barimah won Digital Marketer of the Year at the Youth Excellence Awards ceremony. He was listed among the 50 Most Influential Young Ghanaians for the second time by Avance Media in 2021, and won the Vlogger of the Year award on behalf of Entamoty Media at the Ghana Most influential Youth Awards that same year.
