= Eva Mends =

Ghanaian economist

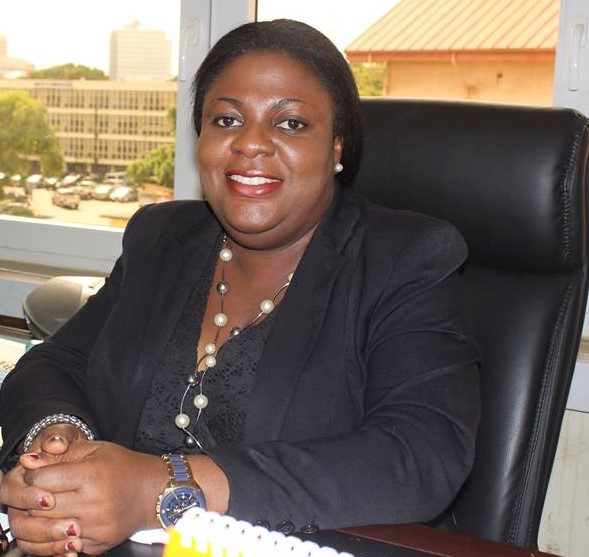
- Education: University of Ghana, Ghana Institute of Management and Public Administration, Harvard University and Duke University
- Alma mater: University of Ghana
- Occupation: Economist. Coordinating director of the Ministry of Finance
- Board member of: Head of The Americas Desk in 1998, Head of Budget Development in 2006 and Group Head of Public Financial Management reforms in 2013,

Eva Esselba Mends is a Ghanaian economist. She was the first Ghanaian female to be appointed director of budget at the Ministry of Finance in Ghana. She was appointed into office in May 2017 by the government.

== Education ==
She attended the University of Ghana, where she acquired a degree in Political Science with Economics. Furthermore, she holds an executive master's degree in Public Administration from Ghana Institute of Management and Public Administration (GIMPA). At the Harvard and Duke Universities, she took some short courses.

== Career ==
Mends joined the Finance Ministry as a national service person in 1991 and since then she has served in various capacities including, Head of The Americas Desk in 1998, Head of Budget Development in 2006 and Group Head of Public Financial Management reforms in 2013. In May 2017, she was appointed director of budget at the Ministry of Finance, a position she held until January 2019. She is known to have led major reforms that include gender responsive budgeting, Programme Based Budgeting and the development of the new Public Financial Management Act. She is currently a coordinating director of the Ministry of Finance. She is the second woman to occupy that position.
