= Georgette Barnes Sakyi-Addo =

Ghanaian businesswoman

President of [[Association of Women In Mining Africa]]
- Incumbent
- Assumed office 28 November 2019
- Preceded by: Mélody Kweba

President [[Accra Mining Network]]
- In office 2015–2020
- Succeeded by: Samuel Torkornoo

President [[Women In Mining Ghana]]
- Incumbent
- Assumed office 2015

Executive director [[Georgette Barnes Limited]]
- Incumbent
- Assumed office 2009

Personal details
- Born: Georgette Baaba Barnes
- Height: 1.67 m (5 ft 6 in)
- Spouse: Kwaku Sakyi-Addo
- Children: 3
- Education: Holy Child High School, Ghana; University of Ghana
- Occupation: Mining Entrepreneur; Gender Advocate

Georgette Barnes Sakyi-Addo is a Ghanaian entrepreneur in the mining industry. She is the founder and executive director of Georgette Barnes Ltd., a Ghanaian drilling and mining supplies company based in Ghana.

== Education ==
She holds a BA in French and Linguistics, and a Graduate Diploma in Communications from the University of Ghana. She was awarded an honorary DSc by the University of Mines and Technology.

== Career ==
=== Accra Mining Network ===
When the mining industry suffered a downturn in 2012, Sakyi-Addo co-founded the Accra Mining Network with Samuel Torkornoo, Raymond Kudzawu-D'Pherdd, and Joseph Djan Mamphey. In 2015, she used that as a blueprint to form Women In Mining Ghana.

She is President of Women in Mining (WIM) Ghana and co-founder of the Accra Mining Network. She was President of Accra Mining Network from 2015 to 2020.

=== Women in Mining Ghana ===
In 2015 she established Women in Mining Ghana (WIM), as a limited company. Its main purpose is to serve as an advocacy body for women working in the mining sector (Industry, Academia and Government) by offering training, mentorship, networking and research projects. She is its current President.

=== Association of Women in Mining in Africa (AWIMA) ===
In November 2019, she was elected as the president of the Association of Women In Mining Africa (AWIMA).

=== Contemporary activities ===
Sakyi-Addo was featured among Women In Mining in Nigeria and the subregion: a monograph with interviews by Fatima Ibrahim Maikore. Sakyi-Addo was also a speaker at the 2022 EU-African Union Business Forum. She was a speaker at the Fire Site Chat of the Kenyan Gem and Jewelry Fair. She gave the opening remarks at the DRC Africa Business Forum 2021 on the social, environmental and governance challenges of battery-related industrial activities. The forum looked at fostering the development of battery, electric vehicle and renewable energy, industry value chain and market in Africa.

She was one of the judges of the Amazon Challenge of Artisanal Mining Challenge in 2020. Conservation X Labs led this event, to make artisanal mining more responsible for people and the planet. The winners were Jeffrey Beyer, Charles Espinosa, Alejandra Laina, Itai Mutemeri, and Marcello Veiga.

== Awards and honors ==
- 2021 Ghana Chamber of Mines Award.
- 2020 University of Mines and Technology (UMaT), Doctor of Science Degree (Honoris Causa)
- 2018 Female Entrepreneur of the Year by Invest in Africa (IIA).
- 2016 100 Global Inspirational Women Mining - by Women in Mining(UK).

== Publications ==
- Kansake, Bruno Ayaga; Sakyi-Addo, Georgette Barnes; Dumakor-Dupey, Nelson Kofi (March 2021). "Creating a gender-inclusive mining industry: Uncovering the challenges of female mining stakeholders". Resources Policy. 70 101962. Bibcode:2021RePol..7001962K. doi:10.1016/j.resourpol.2020.101962.
- Orleans-Boham, H.; Sakyi-Addo, G.B.; Tahiru, A.; Amankwah, R.K. (April 2020). "Women in artisanal mining: Reflections on the impacts of a ban on operations in Ghana". The Extractive Industries and Society. 7 (2): 583–586. doi:10.1016/j.exis.2020.03.004.
- Bansah, Kenneth J.; Dumakor-Dupey, Nelson K.; Sakyi-Addo, Georgette B. (February 2017). Digging for survival: female participation in artisanal and small-scale mining in the Tarkwa mining district of Ghana. SME Annual Meeting. pp. 19–22.
