= Nancy Abu-Bonsrah =

Ghanaian neurosurgeon

- Born: Ghana
- Education: Mount Saint Mary's University; Johns Hopkins University
- Occupation: Neurosurgeon
- Known for: First black female neurosurgeon
- Scientific career
- Fields: Neurosurgery

Nancy Abu-Bonsrah is a Ghanaian neurosurgeon who was the first black female to graduate from Johns Hopkins School of Medicine's neurosurgery program, the school "where the medical discipline of neurological surgery was founded." She was accepted to train at Johns Hopkins in 2017 and graduated in 2024.

== Early life and education ==
Abu-Bonsrah was born in Ghana and moved to Maryland when she was 15. She studied chemistry and biochemistry at Mount Saint Mary's University in Maryland. Then she went to Johns Hopkins University School of Medicine to study medicine. She is the first doctor in her extended family.

Her desire to study neurosurgery was the result of shadowing a neurosurgeon when she visited Ghana when she was a junior in college.

"Usually when I think about brain surgery, I think the brain is sacred and you don't touch it or do anything to it, but to see them do these remarkable surgeries, and have good outcomes was something that impressed me." She also noticed how "overwhelmed" the surgeons appeared to be, saying: "There were countless patients that they had to see and there are so few of them. I thought it would be nice to combine my interest in this field with an opportunity to provide service back to my country and other countries that don't have as much surgical infrastructure."

== Personal life ==
She is married to Kwabena Yamoah, who received his M.D. from University of Maryland School of Medicine. Abu-Bonsrah is a Seventh-day Adventist.

== Awards ==
- Neurosurgeon Research and Education Foundation (NREF) Directed Residency Scholarship award 2021
- Hopkins Neurosurgery Department Irving J. Sherman Traveling Fellowship Award in 2021.
- Johns Hopkins Bloomberg Public Health Practice Awards.2022
- Association for Academic Surgery/Association for Academic Surgery Foundation (AAS/AASF) Global Surgery Research Award in 2022.
- Hopkins Neurosurgery Department Louise Eisenhardt Award in 2023.
