= Lucy Awuni Mbun =

Ghanaian politician

Hon. Lucy Awuni Mbun
- President: John Dramani Mahama

Personal details
- Born: Ghana
- Party: NDC

Lucy Awuni Mbun is a Ghanaian politician and a former deputy Upper East Regional Minister of Ghana. She was appointed by President John Evan Atta Mills and served till January 2013.
