= Karter Zaher =

Ghanaian-Canadian musical artist

Khodor Zaher Khodor Zaher
- Also known as: Karter Zaher (KZ)
- Born: Ottawa, Ontario, Canada
- Genres: hip hop, R&B, soul
- Occupations: Songwriter, rapper, singer
- Website: www.kzaher.com

Kodor Zaher known by his stage name Karter Zaher ("KZ") is a Lebanese Canadian singer, songwriter, rapper and author.

== Early life and education ==
Zaher was born and raised in Ottawa, Ontario and attended Carleton University, where he met Jae Deen and both started the "Deen Squad" movement. He is a Muslim.

== Career ==
Karter Zaher is a co-founder of the music duo Deen Squad that launched in 2015, along with his partner Jae Deen. The band received notable recognition for adding an “Islamic“ twist to mainstream billboard hits - such as "God’s Plan" by Drake, "Havana" by Camila Cabello, and more. Their story was covered by BBC, CNN Arabia, The Fader and other news media.

The Deen Squad band reached over 200 million views by creating “Halal Remixes”.

Zaher was influenced to write and rap by listening to Tupac and Eminem. He played a major role in developing Deen Squad since January 2015 but after his manager Sami Abboud shut him out of the company in May 2019, he became a solo artist and started his own record label named Holy Sound.

Zaher and his band performed for Canada's 150th year celebration in Toronto and was supposedly the opening act for Justin Bieber on his purpose tour in Dubai.
