= Abu Kasanbata =

Ghanaian politician

Hon. Abu Kasanbata
- President: John Dramani Mahama

Personal details
- Born: Mampong, Ghana
- Party: NDC

Abu Kasanbata is a Ghanaian politician and the deputy Upper West Regional Minister of Ghana.
