= Seth Bokpe =

Ghanaian investigative journalist

Seth J. Bokpe
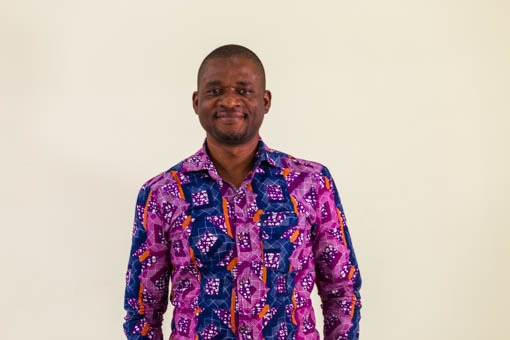
- Born: Seth J. Bokpe; Accra
- Education: Ghana Institute of Journalism; George Washington University; Bloomberg Media
- Occupation: Investigative journalist
- Employer: Media Foundation for West Africa
- Known for: Investigative journalism
- Website: https://thefourthestategh.com/ & https://www.fact-checkghana.com/

Seth Joseph Bokpe is a Ghanaian investigative journalist and the Associate Editor of The Fourth Estate, the public interest and accountability investigative journalism project of the Media Foundation for West Africa (MFWA), and a fact-checker with Fact-Check Ghana. He previously worked with the Graphic Communications Group, Ghana's biggest newspaper publishing company.

== Education ==
Seth earned a Bachelor of Arts in Communication Studies from the Ghana Institute of Journalism and is certified as a Balanced Scorecard Professional by George Washington University. He is also an alumnus of the Bloomberg Media, Africa.

== Career ==
Seth J. Bokpe currently serves as the Associate Editor at The Fourth Estate, a non-profit, public-interest journalism project established by the Media Foundation for West Africa (MFWA). Seth's investigative works mainly center around anti-corruption, environmental, and health journalism. Additionally, he works as a fact-checker for FactCheck Ghana, a fact-checking initiative under MFWA's umbrella. Prior to joining the MFWA, he worked as the News Editor for The Ghana Report, a news portal. Seth worked with the Africa Watch Magazine, as well as freelance for the One World Magazine in the Netherlands. Seth started his career at the largest newspaper in Ghana, the Graphic Communications Group, where he dedicated a decade of service, following a brief stint at the Ghana Broadcasting Corporation.

== Work ==
Bokpe has written and produced anti-corruption stories in the form of in-depth articles. Some of them include:

=== Akufo-Addo’s First & Second Term: 27 ministers who didn’t declare assets at all ===
Seth J. Bokpe story revealed the lack of compliance among Ghanaian politicians with the country’s Asset Declaration Law, Act 550. The law, per the 1992 Constitution, mandates public office holders, including Metropolitan, Municipal, and District Chief Executives (MMDCEs), Ministers, Members of Parliament, presidential staffers, judges, and heads of state institutions, to declare their assets within specific timeframes. The exposé shed light on the widespread non-compliance by public officials, prompting a significant response.

Following the revelations, 294 political appointees hastily declared their assets and liabilities. There was, thus, a surge in declarations among ministers, legislators, and heads of state institutions.

== Awards ==
Seth has received several awards including:

Media awards
Year	Award	Result
2014	Telecommunication Rural Reporting	Won
2016	Komla Dumor Most Promising Journalist of the Year	Won
2017	Best Agriculture report	Won
2018	Environment (Print) Best Transport and Road Safety	Won
2020	Best News Reporting (Print)	Won
2022	Anthony Akoto Ampaw Democracy and Good Governance	Won
2023	Anthony Akoto Ampaw Democracy and Good Governance	Won
2024	Anthony Akoto Ampaw Democracy and Good Governance	Won
2025	Media Freedom Coalition (MFC) Awards	Won

|2025 |Runner-up African Investigative Journalist of the Year https://test.qstar.co.za/south-africas-dewald-van-rensburg-named-2025-african-investigative-journalist-of-the-year/
