= Natalie Fort =

Ghanaian news anchor

- Born: 24 July 1995 (age 31)
- Citizenship: Ghana
- Education: Ghana international school
- Occupations: News anchor, Television personality, journalist
- Employer: GHone Television
- Organization: Fort foundation
- Awards: Awarded by the United nations with the Gold star order of the companion honour Excellent personality merit award in 2017

Natalie Fort is a news anchor and a Ghanaian television personality.

== Early life and education ==
Fort was born on 24 July 1995 and attended Ghana International School, Merton International School, the Royal Academy of Music and Accra Film School. She began her career as a fashion model and represented Ghana in 2011 at the Miss Princess World Competition in Czech Republic. She is the founder of Fort Model Management and Fort Foundation. She was awarded by the United Nations with the Gold Star Order of the Companion Honour and also accorded the Excellent Personality Merit Award in 2017.

== Career ==
Natalie is a Senior Broadcast Journalist, News Anchor, and Foreign Affairs Correspondent. She began her broadcasting career with the TV3 Network of Media General, where, within less than a year, she rose to become one of the network’s lead news anchors, anchoring the flagship prime-time bulletin News 360. During her tenure, she worked on the International & General News Desk and hosted Women’s Take on 3FM (92.7), a program examining women’s influence on governance and public leadership in Ghana. She then resigned on 5 April 2021 and had a deal with EIB Network's GHOne Television. This announcement was made by Nana Aba Anamoah, the General Manager of GhOne Television in a video shared on her Instagram page.

She currently serves as Senior Broadcast Journalist and Foreign Affairs Correspondent with GHOne TV and Starr FM, subsidiaries of EIB Network, Africa’s fastest-growing media group. She is also the host and executive face of the award-winning The Natalie Fort Show, which was named TV Development Show of the Year (2023) by the Radio and Television Personality (RTP) Awards for its contribution to development discourse, thought leadership, and impactful television programming. She has been a key anchor in the coverage of three general elections in Ghana, earning the trust of senior political leaders, policymakers, diplomats, and private-sector executives.
