= Dr Ray Beat =

Ghanaian record producer

- Also known as: Dr Ray Beat
- Born: Nana Yaw Nkrumah; Accra, Ghana
- Origin: Breman Asikuma, Ghana
- Genres: Hip hop; Hiplife; Dancehall; Afropop; Afrobeats; Azonto
- Occupations: Record producer, sound engineer
- Instrument: Piano
- Years active: 2008–present
- Label: Talent House Records

Nana Yaw Nkrumah born in Accra, professionally known as Dr Ray Beat is a Ghanaian record producer and sound engineer, who produces music ranging from Afrobeat, Hip hop, Hiplife, Azonto, Dancehall and Afropop. He also produced for Guru, Kwaw Kese, Kofi Kinaata and more.

== Early life ==
Dr Ray Beat was born in Accra, raised and started his education at Agona Ododen in the Breman Asikuma District.

== Career ==
He started working as a record producer officially in 2008. He has since worked with and produced several Ghanaian artistes such as Atumpan and Kofi Kinaata. He was nominated for Producer of the Year at the 2016 Vodafone Ghana Music Awards for his production on Atom's 2015 hit song "Yewo Krom".

=== Discography ===
Year	Album/Song	Artist	Credit
2015	Y3 Wo Krom	Atom & Kwaw Kese	Music Producer
2014	Oh Azaay	Kofi Kinaata	Music Producer
2014	Street Popping	Guru & Ennwai	Music Producer
2016	I love you	Kwaw Kese & Abena Akuaba	Music Producer

== Accolades ==
Year	Event	Prize	Recipient	Result	Ref
2016	Ghana Music Awards UK	Producer of the Year	Himself	Nominated	
2016	Vodafone Ghana Music Awards	Producer of the Year	Himself	Nominated	
2017	Ghana-Naija Showbiz Awards	Producer of the Year	Himself	Nominated	
2021	Face Of Ghana Youth Awards	Producer Of The Year	Himself	Won	
2021	Best Song of the year	Top Entertainment Awards Ghana	Himself	Won	
2021	Producer of the year	Greater Accra Music Awards (GAMA)	Himself	Won	
2021	Sound Engineer / Producer of the year	Ghana Entertainment Choice Awards	Himself	Won	
2021	Global Music Awards Africa	Sound Engineer Of The year	Himself	Won	
