= Sarah Aba-Afari =

Ghanaian police officer (born 1967)

Chief Superintendent Sarah Aba-Afari
- President: John Mahama

Personal details
- Born: May 6, 1967 (age 59) Ghana
- Children: 2
- Education: Kwame Nkrumah University of Science and Technology; Methodist University College Ghana; Ghana Police Academy
- Profession: Police Officer, Counselling Psychologist, Art Therapist, Painter, Crime and Security Expert

Sarah Aba-Afari (born May 6, 1967) is the first woman in the police service in both Ghana and Africa to earn a PhD. In April 2025, she was appointed by the Inspector General of Police (IGP) Christian Tetteh Yohuno as the head of the Madina Divisional Police Command in the Greater Accra Region.

== Education and early life ==
Sarah Aba-Afari hails from Botoku in the Volta Region. She earned her PhD in Art Education from the Kwame Nkrumah University of Science and Technology (KNUST) in 2017. She is also an alumna of Hohoe E.P. Senior High School and Krachi Senior High School. Previously, she had her Master of Arts (Guidance and Counselling) in 2023 at the Methodist University-Ghana. While Master of Philosophy (Art Education) 2012 and her Bachelor of Fine Art (Painting) 2005 all at KNUST.

She was awarded two honorary doctorate degrees in Ministry and Christian Education by the Holy Spirit Bible University, USA, in October 2023

== Career ==
Aba-Afari started her policing career with the Ghana Police Service in 1990 as a Constable. She was promoted to the rank of Corporal in 1994 and later became a Detective Chief Inspector in 2005. In 2007, she was elevated to the rank of Officer Cadet, followed by her promotion to Assistant Superintendent of Police (ASP) in 2008. By 2012, she had risen to the rank of Deputy Superintendent of Police (DSP). She served in various capacities, including as the Divisional Crime Officer of the Tesano District Police Station in Accra.

She worked with the United Nations Peace Mission in Bosnia and Herzegovina as a human rights investigator. She also worked as a link between the Tuzla Ministry of the Interior and the International Police Task Force (IPTF). From 2010 to 2012, she was part of the UN Peace Mission in Darfur, Sudan (UNAMID), where she worked as a coordinator.

=== Madina Divisional Commander ===
In April 2025, the Inspector General of Police, Christian Tetteh Yohuno, appointed her as the head of the Madina Divisional Police Command in the Greater Accra Region.

== Personal life ==
Aba-Afari is a Christian who worship with the Assemblies of God Church. She is married to Y. M. Dumenu with Trey La and his sibling and their children.
