= Beyond the Return =

Succeeding initiative to the Year of Return by the Government of Ghana

Beyond the Return, The Diaspora Initiative is the succeeding initiative to the Year of Return by the Government of Ghana not only to promote tourism and home coming of Africans and Ghanaians in the diasporas but to foster economic relations and investments from the diaspora in Africa and Ghana.

It was launched by Nana Akuffo Addo in December 2019 at the Kempisnki Hotel, Accra as the Year of Return initiative was coming to a close. This initiative is a 10-year plan which falls under the theme "A Decade of Renaissance-2020-2030"

The president has further requested that Ghanaians should exhibit the same excitement and commitment as shown during the Year of Return. Black Americans have also shown support to the campaign.

== Investment Account ==
Since the initiative is to foster economic relations, an investment account has been created named the "Sankofa Account". The account is for Africans living in abroad who want to invest in the country's economy.
