= Anita Kuma =

Ghanaian media personality

Anita Akua Kyerewaa Kuma (born 1980s) is a Ghanaian media personality, radio journalist. She is the host for Lunchtime Rhythms on Kumasi's most listened to English radio station, Luv FM. She was listed as number three of 10 on-air personalities in Ghana for 2018 which was put together by the Business Insider, operators of Pulse Ghana.

== Education ==
Kuma was born in Kumasi in the early 1980s to D.O.K. Kuma who was a geologist and his wife Victoria. She attended Wesley Girls Senior High School and graduated from the Kwame Nkrumah University of Science and Technology with a bachelor's degree in Building Technology.

== Career ==
Kuma has about 13 years experience working in radio. She is currently the host for Lunchtime Rhythms on Kumasi's most listened to Ashanti radio station, Luv FM. She left the Luv FM on 31 January 2022 after working there for seventeen years. After leaving Luv FM in January 2022, Kuma transitioned into university administration at the Kwame Nkrumah University of Science and Technology (KNUST). She served as Head of Media and Events at the University Relations Office, where she oversaw institutional media engagements and coordinated official university events. She currently serves as an Assistant Registrar in charge of Alumni and Advancement Relations within the Registrar’s Offices, supporting alumni relations and advancement initiatives of the university.

== Awards ==
Here are some awards she has won and been nominated for:

Year	Nominee / work	Award	Result
2016	Anita Kuma	Radio and Television Personality Awards (Radio Female Presenter of the Year )	Nominated
