= Ama Hemmah =

Suspected Ghanaian witch

- Born: 1937
- Died: 21 November 2010 (aged 72)

Ama Hemmah (1937–2010) was a Ghanaian woman who was burned to death on suspicion of being a witch.

== Immolation ==
Around 10:00 am on 20 November 2010, at Tema Site 15, evangelical pastor Samuel Fletcher Sagoe visited his sister, Emilia, where he saw Hemmah sitting in his sister's bedroom while Emilia's children were at school. Sagoe raised an alarm, which attracted the attention of Samuel Ghunney and others in the neighborhood. According to Mr. Augustine Gynening, Assistant Commissioner of Police, Hemmah was purported to be a witch. Hemmah was then allegedly tortured into a confession of witchcraft by a group of five people, at which point they allegedly attempted to exorcise the evil spirit in Hemmah by dousing her in kerosene and setting her on fire. Members of the group claim they poured anointing oil on the woman, which accidentally caught fire.

A student nurse, Deborah Pearl Adumoah, came to her rescue and sent her to the Community One Police Station. Hemmah was transferred to Tema General Hospital, where she died the following day. She was 72 years old.

== Suspects ==
The suspects are Samuel Ghunney, a 50-year-old photographer; Samuel Fletcher Sagoe, 55; Emilia Opoku, 37; Nancy Nana Ama Akrofie, 46; and Mary Sagoe, 52.

== Public response ==
Although belief in witchcraft is relatively common in Ghana, the public was shocked and outraged at Hemmah's murder. Stephen Yeboah, Hemmah's son, told The Daily Graphic, "Our mother was never a witch and had never suffered any mental disorder throughout her life, apart from exhibiting signs of forgetfulness and other symptoms of old age." In a statement issued by the Head of Public Relations at the Commission for Human Rights and Administrative Justice (CHRAJ), Comfort Akosua Edo, said, "The Commission finds the action of the perpetrators of this atrocious crime as very barbaric and one that greatly dims the nation's human rights record...It is, indeed, very disheartening that some men of God, whose responsibility it is to help save lives, could rather orchestrate the killing of innocent souls, all in the name of God." The statement called on all Ghanaians to refuse involvement in mob attacks on those accused of witchcraft.

== Witchcraft in Ghana ==
In many parts of Africa, black magic, or witchcraft, is blamed for illnesses, deaths, droughts, fires, or other natural disasters. In the northern region, women who are suspected or accused of witchcraft are often forcibly or violently exiled from their communities to witch camps where they face deplorable conditions, such as limited or insufficient access to food, water, housing, and healthcare. Many face continued abuse. Reasons vary for the accusations: they are often elderly and widows, incapable of bearing children, or otherwise defy gender roles and norms; some suffer from mental disorders or physical disabilities, or engage in eccentric behavior; some are simply victims of personal jealousies. Professor Dzodzi Tsikata of the University of Ghana said, "The camps are a dramatic manifestation of the status of women in Ghana. Older women become a target because they are no longer useful to society."

In 2014, through the Ministry of Gender, Children, and Social Protection, the Ghanaian government initiated a move to shut down all witch camps and reintegrate the women back into society; however, these camps still remain due to the endemic superstition around witchcraft and the complications reintegration poses to accused women.
