= Maudlyn Akosua Awuku =

Ghanaian women's rights advocate

Maudlyn Akosua Awuku is a Ghanaian women's rights advocate. She is the founder and CEO of GEWE Network, and Anijie Global Foundation. In 2022 she was a delegate of the UN Women UK delegation to the Commission on the Status of Women (CSW) for the sixty-sixth session in New York.

== Education ==
Awuku holds a degree in Sociology and Political Studies from the Kwame Nkrumah University of Science and Technology. She also holds an Executive MBA in Leadership and Management from the Accra Business School, an Msc. in Project Management from the University of Salford, Manchester, and a Diploma in French Language Studies.

== Career ==
Awuku's work has focused on assisting black and underprivileged populations to achieve gender equality in the United Kingdom. Her work as the founder of the GEWE Network is focused on promoting gender equality and inspiring women to assume positions of political and civic leadership. As the founder of Anijie Global Foundation in Ghana, her organization has been dedicated to implementing projects that contribute to attaining the Sustainable Development Goals.

== Awards ==
- Young Achievers Award at the UK House of Commons
- Nominated for the 2023 Forty under 40 UK Awards under Community Development.
- Salford University Alumni Achievement Awards 2023.
