= Mahama Shaibu =

Ghanaian radio journalist

Mahama Saibu
- Born: Tamale, Ghana
- Occupations: Freelance journalist; Lecturer

Mahama Shaibu born and raise in Tamale, the northern part of Ghana, is a broadcast journalist who once work with Zaa Radio -Tamale and Joy FM -Accra, both in Ghana. He was a part-time lecturer at the International institute of journalism in Tamale.

He is a Ghanaian broadcast journalist with Zaa Radio - Tamale and Joy FM - Accra, both in Ghana.

He contested but lost the Tamale Central Constituency parliamentary elections in 2012 as an independent candidate. He is an executive assistant at Savannah Accelerated Development Authority (SADA) and a spokesperson for the Andani Royal Family.
