= Alice Mamaga Akosua Amoako =

Ghanaian digital social entrepreneur

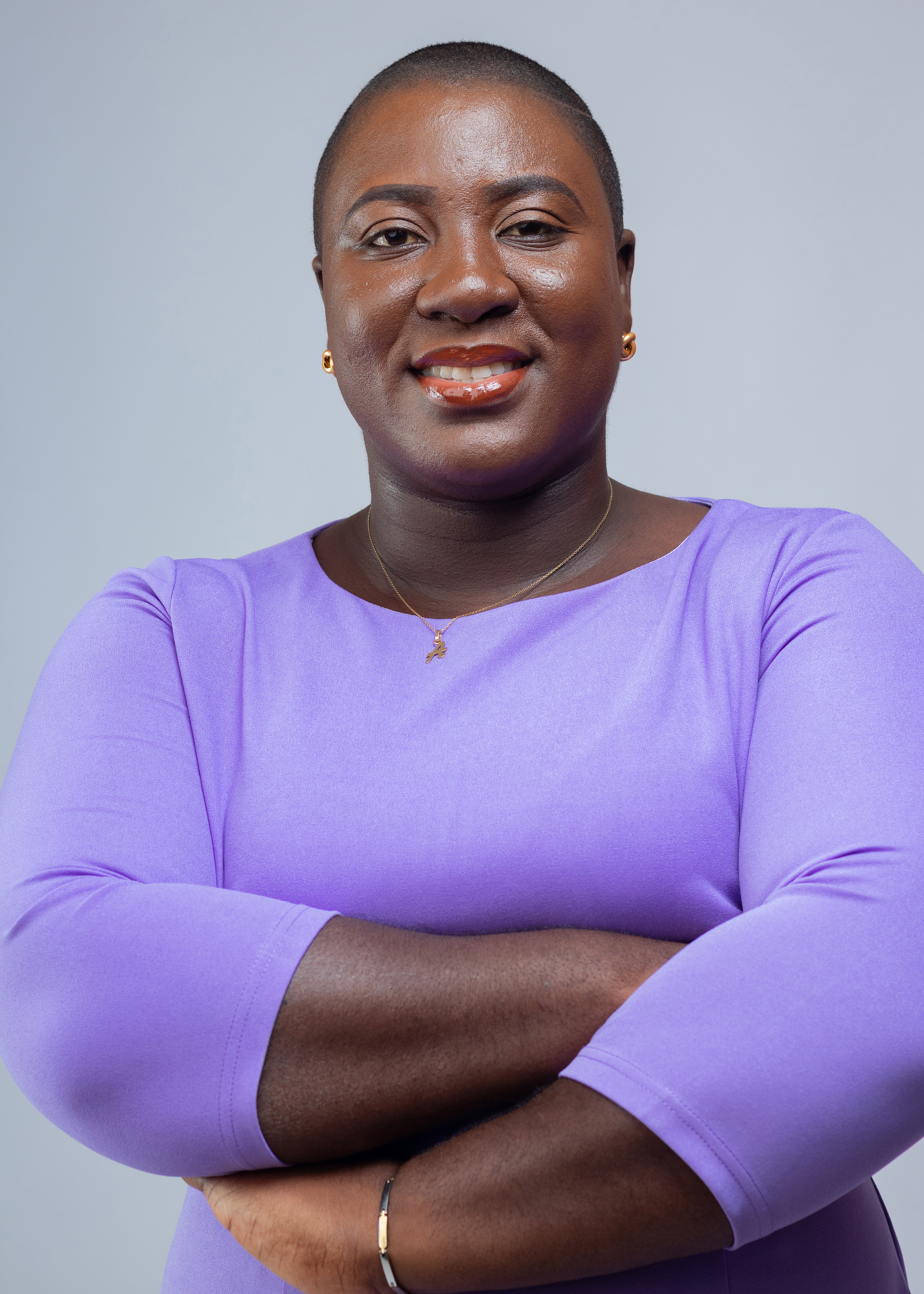
- Alice Mamaga Akosua Amoako
- Education: Ghana Telecom University College
- Occupation: Social entrepreneur
- Years active: 2014–present
- Known for: Co-creator of Autism Aid app
- Title: Founder, Autism Ambassadors of Ghana

Alice Mamaga Akosua Amoako is a Ghanaian social entrepreneur and the founder of Autism Ambassadors of Ghana. She is one of the developers of the Autism Aid app.

== Early life and education ==
At the age of 13, Amoako joined a youth radio program called 'Curious Minds', with encouragement from her mother. Amoako attended Ghana Communication Technology University and received her Bachelor of Information Technology in 2015.

== Career ==
In 2014, Amoako founded the Autism Ambassadors of Ghana, an autism awareness organisation focused on promoting autism awareness and improving the lives of autistic people through technology.

Amoako worked with Solomon Avemegah to co-develop an Android application, Autism Aid, which provides alternative and augmentative communication and healthcare resources for autistic children living in Ghana and West Africa.

Amoako is a member of the national committee of the United Nations Convention on the Rights of Persons with Disabilities. In 2016, she was part of a panel at the World Youth Summit of Girl Guides. She also represented Ghana at the Global Social Hackathon in Sweden.

== Awards ==
Awards
Year	Award	Notes
2014	Digital Change-Makers	With Solomon Avemegah
2017	Coca-Cola Young Achievers	
2018	mYouth Challenge	National and continental winner
2019	Startupper of the Year	One of three winners
