= Solomon Joojo Cobbinah =

Ghanaian journalist

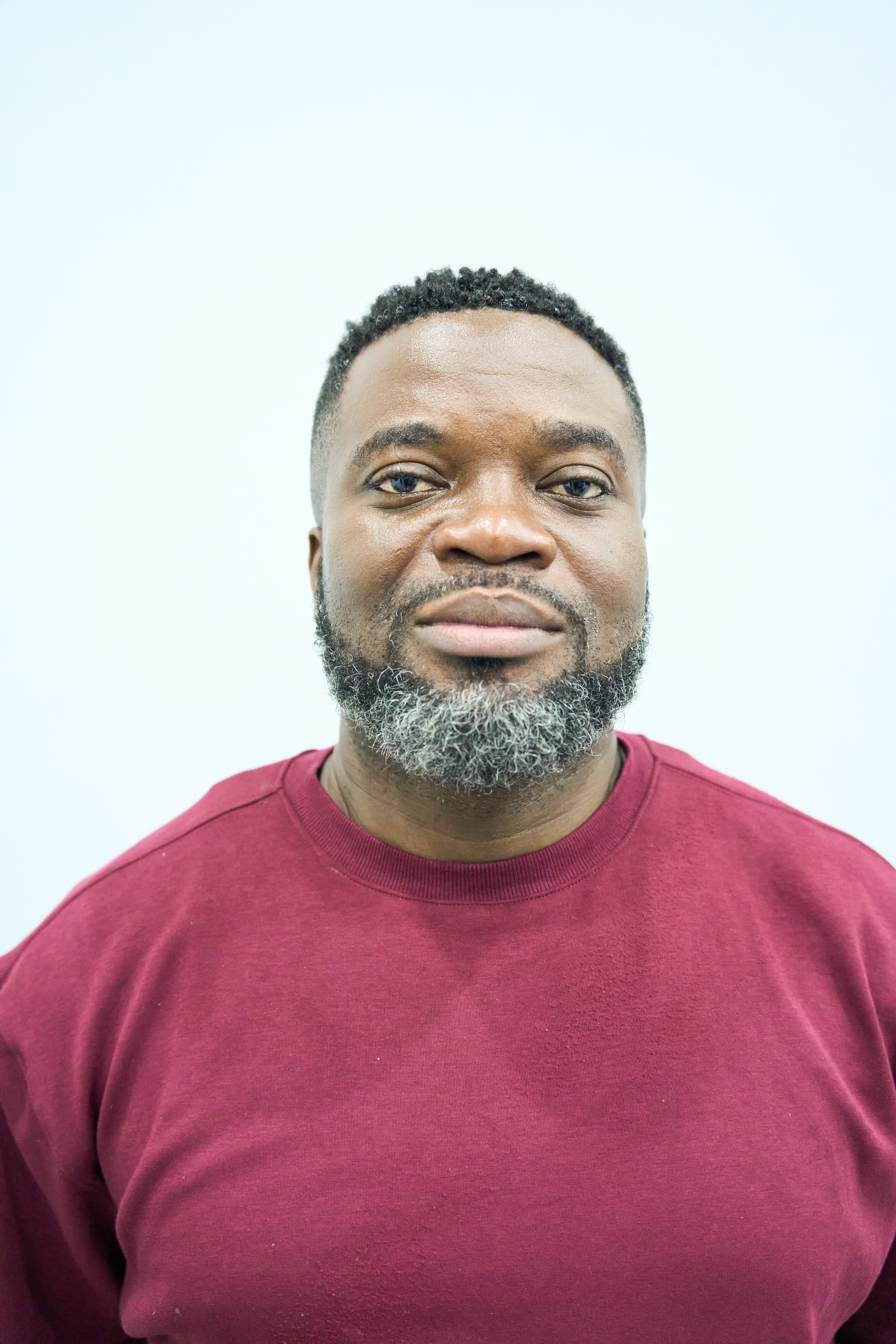
- Born: Solomon Joojo Cobbinah
- Other name: Joojo Cobbinah
- Citizenship: Ghana
- Education: Ghana Institute of Journalism
- Occupation: Journalist
- Years active: 2008 - present

Solomon Joojo Cobbinah (commonly known as Joojo Cobbinah) is a Ghanaian investigative journalist and human rights advocate. He is currently an Associate Editor at The Fourth Estate, a nonprofit, public interest, and accountability investigative journalism project of the Media Foundation for West Africa.

== Education ==
Cobbinah attended Accra Academy for his senior high school education before attending the Ghana Institute of Journalism where he obtained a Bachelor of Arts in communications in 2008. He later pursued postgraduate studies at the University of Pretoria in South Africa, earning an Master of Philosophy in Human Rights and Democratisation in Africa through the Centre for Human Rights.

== Career ==
Cobbinah began his journalism career with TV3 Ghana, where he reported mainly on health and social issues. He later joined the Joy News as a features editor, producer, and investigative reporter. His work has highlighted challenges faced by vulnerable communities, including forced evictions, child rights, and access to healthcare. He later joined the EIB Network, which included GHOne TV, Starr FM and Kasapa FM, as the Group Managing News Editor.

In addition to newsroom reporting, Cobbinah has collaborated with human rights organisations and international advocacy groups, producing reports and engaging in strategic litigation. He is currently an Associate Editor at The Fourth Estate, an investigative journalism project in Ghana. At The Fourth Estate, the journalist has contributed to investigations that have led to public debate and official responses from state institutions. Among his works is the Medical Kalabule investigation, an investigative series that uncovered allegations of extortion and unethical practices at the Greater Accra Regional Hospital (Ridge). The story led to the constitution of a committee to investigate the findings. Subsequently, the Ministry of Health announced new financing measures and payment controls in public hospitals.

== Litigation and Advocacy ==
=== Arrests and Press-Freedom Incidents ===
Cobbinah and colleagues were at times arrested or charged while covering forced evictions in Accra. In one instance, he and other reporters were charged with “offensive conduct” following demolition coverage, a move criticised by civil society and press freedom advocates. Later court rulings described the actions of some public officials as unlawful interference with journalists’ rights.

=== Constitutional and Human-Rights Cases ===
- Accra Metropolitan Assembly case — Cobbinah was a named applicant in a constitutional and human rights suit against the Accra Metropolitan Assembly (AMA) following demolitions linked to his reporting.
- River Offin cases — Working with the Institute for Human Rights and Development in Africa (IHRDA), Cobbinah filed communications on behalf of schoolgirls in Ashanti Region communities along the River Offin, alleging state violations of the African Charter on the Rights and Welfare of the Child.

== Awards and nominations ==
Media awards
Year	Award	Result	
Vera Chiwa Award	2018	Impactful and Courageous Journalism	Won
Article 19 Press Prize	2019	Overall winner - As If We Weren't Humans	Won
Ghana Journalism Awards	2022	Documentary - Searching for Witch Hunters	Won
