= Amanda Akuokor Clinton =

Ghanaian lawyer

Amanda Akuokor Clinton is the C.E.O of Bitcoin Exchange Africa and the founding partner of the law office of Clinton Consultancy, an African-wide boutique consultancy. She specializes in corporate law, market-entry, crisis management and litigation. She has represented international corporate clients in Africa and offers regulatory navigation and government affairs services. In Ghana, she has assisted commercial clients to build major projects in Accra, buy out banks and represented, among others, investors of Menzgold Ghana Limited, TCL Ghana Limited and Gold Coast Securities Limited. She has also represented the Ghana Football Association as they made formal responses to the government of Ghana and FIFA. She is the first female presidential aspirant of the Ghana Football Association.

== Education ==
Amanda Clinton was called to the English Bar in 2006 and the Ghanaian Bar in 2009 and between 2002 and 2003, she acquired a master's degree in African Politics from the University of London.

== Career ==
Clinton is a market entry and litigation expert who specializes in Commercial Law and Crisis Management throughout Africa. She worked in the Office of Ghana's Attorney-General for 42 months. During her time at the Attorney-General's office, one of the cases she worked on was a case involving Kosmos Oil Company and oil spill that occurred in 2010. She founded Clinton Consultancy firm which has offices in Ghana, Sierra Leone Nigeria and Egypt.

In 2018, she was contracted by some clients of the defunct gold dealership firm, Menzgold to represent them in court as they fight to retrieve their monies from the company. Prior to that, she represented the Ghana Football Association to ensure that the institution was not legally grounded by the government and FIFA.

== Ghana Football Association ==
=== Presidential Elections ===
In 2019 Clinton contested in the presidential elections of the Ghana Football Association (GFA), making her the first female presidential aspirant. On 25 October 2019, she lost the elections to Kurt Okraku emerging as the GFA president-elect. At the end of the elections she showed her appreciation to Accra Hearts of Oak as they were the club that nominated and supported her quest to become the first female GFA president.
