= Beatrice Wiafe Addai =

Ghanaian medical officer

Beatrice Wiafe Addai is a Ghanaian physician, breast surgeon, and cancer advocate. She is the founder and president of Breast Care International (BCI) and the chief executive officer of Peace and Love Hospitals in Ghana. Her work has focused on breast cancer management, cancer prevention, screening, health education, and improving access to cancer care. She has also participated in international research collaborations on breast cancer and has held leadership and advisory positions in cancer and public health organizations.

== Education ==
Wiafe Addai received her early education at Mpraeso Presbyterian Primary School in the Eastern Region of Ghana. She continued her secondary education in Ghana before pursuing medical studies abroad. She worked for a period at Atibie Hospital before obtaining a government-sponsored scholarship to study medicine in the Soviet Union.

In 1982, she was among a small group of Ghanaian students selected to study medicine at Zaporozhye State Medical University (now Zaporizhzhia State Medical University) in the Ukrainian Soviet Socialist Republic. She completed her studies in general medicine and graduated with an M.D. degree in 1989.

== Career ==
=== Medical career ===
Wiafe Addai began her medical career at Komfo Anokye Teaching Hospital in Kumasi. She subsequently trained in general surgery and developed a professional focus on breast cancer management.

In 2002, she founded Peace and Love Hospitals, a healthcare organization providing medical services in Ghana. She also founded Breast Care International, a nongovernmental organization focused on breast health and cancer awareness.

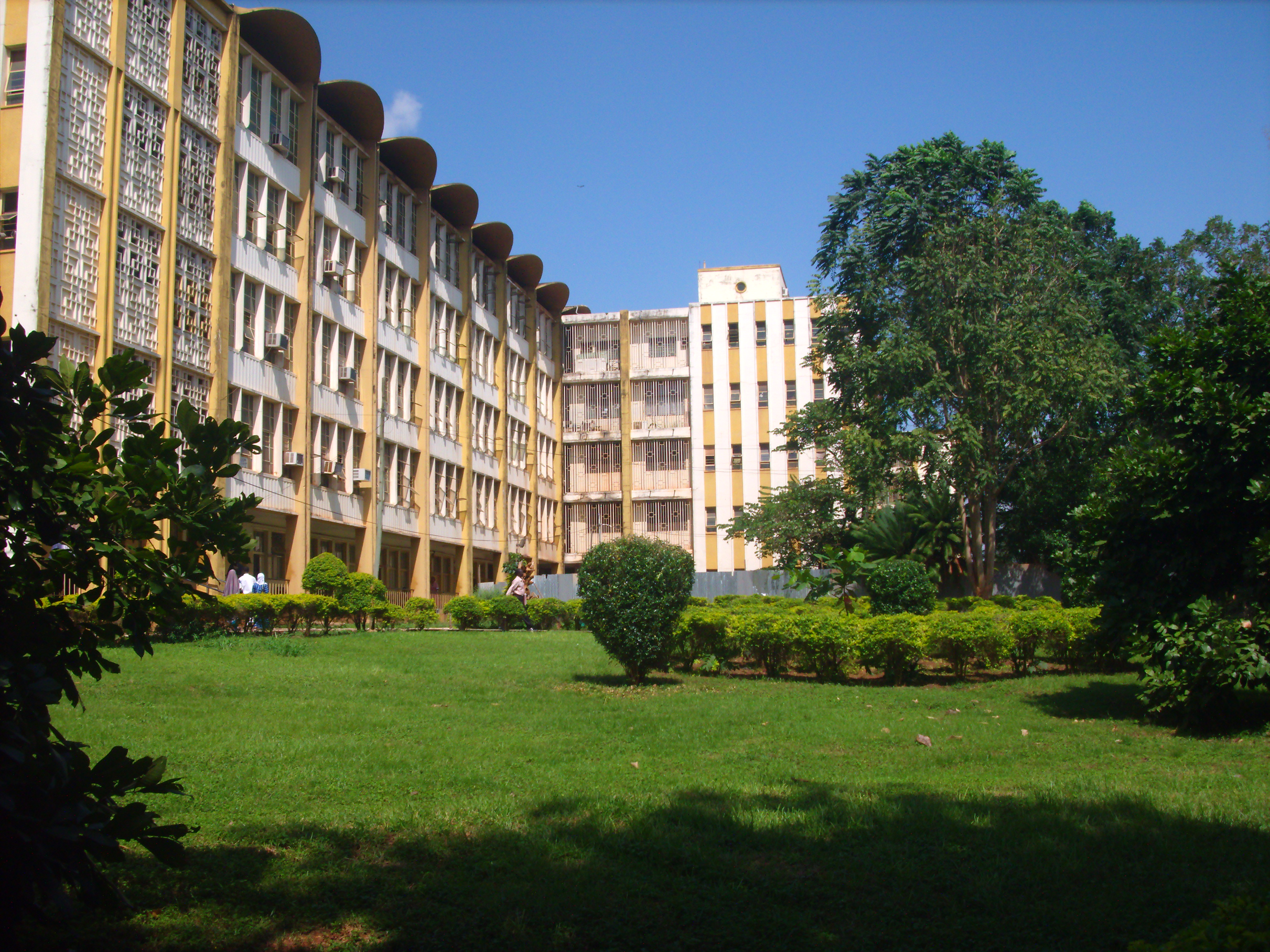
The hospital where Dr. Wiafe Addai was employed in from 1989-Unknown

=== Peace and Love Hospitals and Breast Care International ===
Wiafe Addai established Peace and Love Hospitals and Breast Care International in 2002. BCI's activities have included breast-cancer education, screening, patient support, and community outreach. A study published in the International Journal of Cancer examined the impact of a BCI breast-cancer awareness programme in rural Ghana.

=== Research and international work ===
Wiafe Addai has been involved in research on breast cancer in Ghana, including the Ghana Breast Health Study, a collaborative project involving Ghanaian institutions and the United States National Cancer Institute. She was a member of the research team and co-authored publications based on the study.

Her research contributions have addressed breast-cancer risk factors, diagnostic delays, cancer genetics and the epidemiology of breast cancer among Ghanaian women. This work has examined genetic, environmental and other factors associated with the disease.

=== Other works and advocacy ===
Wiafe Addai has held leadership positions in cancer research, prevention and public-health organizations. She chaired the Ghana Race for the Cure, an initiative associated with Susan G. Komen, and participated in breast-cancer awareness programmes in Ghana.

Within the African Organisation for Research and Training in Cancer (AORTIC), she has served as vice-president for West Africa and president-elect. She has also chaired the Ghana Non-Communicable Diseases Alliance and served as chairperson of the Ghana Cancer Board. She is a member of the Medical Advisory Council of Direct Relief.

=== Cancer centre project ===
Wiafe Addai has been involved in the development of the Otumfuo Osei Tutu II Comprehensive Cancer Center of Excellence near Ejisu. The centre was established as a project to expand access to cancer diagnosis and treatment in Ghana, with provisions for research and professional training.

== Selected publications ==
- Mena, Marisa; Wiafe-Addai, Beatrice; Sauvaget, Catherine; Ali, Ibrahim A.; Wiafe, Seth A.; Dabis, François; Anderson, Benjamin O.; Malvy, Denis; Sasco, Annie J. (2013-08-29). "Evaluation of the impact of a breast cancer awareness program in rural Ghana: A cross-sectional survey". International Journal of Cancer. 134 (4): 913–924. doi:10.1002/ijc.28412. ISSN 0020-7136. PMID 23913595.
- Brinton, Louise; Figueroa, Jonine; Adjei, Ernest; Ansong, Daniel; Biritwum, Richard; Edusei, Lawrence; Nyarko, Kofi M.; Wiafe, Seth; Yarney, Joel; Addai, Beatrice Wiafe; Awuah, Baffour; Clegg-Lamptey, Joe Nat (2016-12-26). "Factors contributing to delays in diagnosis of breast cancers in Ghana, West Africa". Breast Cancer Research and Treatment. 162 (1): 105–114. doi:10.1007/s10549-016-4088-1. ISSN 0167-6806. PMC 5290196. PMID 28025716.
- White, Kaitlin E.; Booker, Quiera; Titiloye, Nicholas; Edusei, Lawrence; Brinton, Louise; Wiafe, Beatrice; Adjei, Ernest; Figueroa, Jonine (2024-09-21). "Abstract A036: Hair relaxers use and breast cancer risk by tumor estrogen receptor status: Results from the Ghana Breast Health study". Cancer Epidemiology, Biomarkers & Prevention. 33 (9_Supplement): A036. doi:10.1158/1538-7755.disp24-a036. ISSN 1538-7755.
- Nyante, Sarah J.; Biritwum, Richard; Figueroa, Jonine; Graubard, Barry; Awuah, Baffour; Addai, Beatrice Wiafe; Yarney, Joel; Clegg-Lamptey, Joe Nat; Ansong, Daniel; Nyarko, Kofi; Wiafe, Seth; Oppong, Joseph; Boakye, Isaac; Brotzman, Michelle; Adjei, Robertson (2019-04-16). "Recruiting population controls for case-control studies in sub-Saharan Africa: The Ghana Breast Health Study". PLOS ONE. 14 (4) e0215347. Bibcode:2019PLoSO..1415347N. doi:10.1371/journal.pone.0215347. ISSN 1932-6203. PMC 6467449. PMID 30990841.
- Figueroa, Jonine; Lynn, Brittny C. Davis; Edusei, Lawrence; Titiloye, Nicholas; Adjei, Ernest; Clegg-Lamptey, Joe-Nat; Yarney, Joel; Wiafe-Addai, Beatrice; Awuah, Baffour; Duggan, Maire A.; Wiafe, Seth; Nyarko, Kofi; Aitpillah, Francis; Ansong, Daniel; Hewitt, Stephen M. (2019). "Reproductive Factors and Risk of Breast Cancer by Tumour Subtypes Among Ghanaian Women: A Population-Based Case-Control Study". SSRN Electronic Journal. doi:10.2139/ssrn.3426075. ISSN 1556-5068.
- Wu, Zeni; Byrd, Doratha A.; Wan, Yunhu; Ansong, Daniel; Clegg-Lamptey, Joe-Nat; Wiafe-Addai, Beatrice; Edusei, Lawrence; Adjei, Ernest; Titiloye, Nicholas; Dedey, Florence; Aitpillah, Francis; Oppong, Joseph; Vanderpuye, Verna; Osei-Bonsu, Ernest; Dagnall, Casey L. (2022-10-15). "The oral microbiome and breast cancer and nonmalignant breast disease, and its relationship with the fecal microbiome in the Ghana Breast Health Study". International Journal of Cancer. 151 (8): 1248–1260. doi:10.1002/ijc.34145. ISSN 0020-7136. PMC 9420782. PMID 35657343.
- Ahearn, Thomas U.; Choudhury, Parichoy Pal; Derkach, Andriy; Wiafe-Addai, Beatrice; Awuah, Baffour; Yarney, Joel; Edusei, Lawrence; Titiloye, Nicholas; Adjei, Ernest; Vanderpuye, Verna; Aitpillah, Francis; Dedey, Florence; Oppong, Joseph; Osei-Bonsu, Ernest Baawuah; Duggan, Máire A. (2022-08-02). "Breast Cancer Risk in Women from Ghana Carrying Rare Germline Pathogenic Mutations". Cancer Epidemiology, Biomarkers & Prevention. 31 (8): 1593–1601. doi:10.1158/1055-9965.EPI-21-1397. ISSN 1055-9965. PMC 11284919. PMID 35654374.
- Nair, Shuait; Ngwa, Wilfred; Addai, Beatrice Wiafe; Addai, Abena O.; Oti, Benjamin Asante (2025). "The role of a national cancer registry in effective implementation and monitoring of the Global Breast Cancer Initiative (GBCI) framework in Ghana: a narrative review". Translational Breast Cancer Research. 6: 20. doi:10.21037/tbcr-24-60. PMC 12104953. PMID 40421150.
