= San Nasamu Asabigi =

Ghanaian politician

Hon. San Nasamu Asabigi
- President: John Dramani Mahama

Personal details
- Born: Ghana
- Party: NDC

San Nasamu Asabigi is a Ghanaian politician and a former deputy Northern Regional Minister of Ghana. He was appointed by President John Evan Atta Mills and served till January 2013.
