= Mavis Owureku-Asare =

Ghanaian food scientist

- Citizenship: Ghana
- Education: Kwame Nkrumah University of Science and Technology
- Occupation: food scientist
- Employer: Impact Food Hub
- Organization: Kasmalink Consult
- Spouse: Elhanan Owureku-Asare
- Awards: African Women in Agricultural Research and Development Fellow, 2012 recipient, Norman E. Borlaug International Agricultural Science and Technology scholarship award.

Mavis Owureku-Asare is a Ghanaian food scientist. She researched the use of solar dehydration to preserve tomatoes. She conducted research showing that poor quality foods were sold in some Ghanaian markets. She was previously the CEO of Impact Food Hub, a leading Consultancy for Agribusinesses in Ghana.She is the founder of kasmafoods, a leading food processing company in Ghana. She was a principal research scientist at the Biotechnology and Nuclear Agriculture Research Institute of the Ghana Atomic Energy Commission. She is a fellow of the Norman E. Borlaug Leadership Enhancement in Agriculture Program (LEAP) and a recipient of the African Women in Agricultural Research and Development (AWARD).

== Education ==
Owureku-Asare holds a PhD in Food Science and Technology from the Kwame Nkrumah University of Science and Technology. She is a visiting scholar at Purdue University, West Lafayette Indiana USA.

She obtained her BSc in Nutrition and Foodscience and Mphil degree in Foodscience from the University of Ghana. She attended Wesley Girls' Senior High School in Cape Coast. She is certified in the FSPCA Preventive Controls Course for Human Food from the USDA.

== Career ==
She is the founder of Impact Food Hub, an agribusiness consultancy that provides tailored support services and products for agribusinesses to help them produce food brands that can compete globally. She is the Executive director of Kasmafoods, a food processing company based in Ghana. She is also a board member of Ghana-India Trade Advisory Chamber (GITAC).

== Research ==
She studies practical agricultural technologies and solutions that help smallholder farmers and improve the livelihoods of women in Ghana. One of her efforts focused on developing improved solar drying technologies for the post-harvest management of agricultural produce with a focus on tomatoes.

She researched the quality of foods sold in Ghanaian markets and discovered that foods sold in five markets (Agbogbloshie, Dome, Kaneshie, Makola and Okaishie) in Ghana contained poor nutrients. The foods examined in this research included tomatoes, oranges, pineapples, garden eggs, cocoyam leaves, shrimp and fish powder. It was revealed that fruits such as oranges were displayed in the sun and on the floor, which affects the vitamin C content of the fruit. Likewise, she found that due to the market conditions, substances like lycopene and other antioxidants in tomatoes were destroyed. Her research also revealed that 98% of palm oil on sale was adulterated with cancer-causing agents and groundnut paste was mixed with dried cassava powder.

== Personal life ==
Owureku-Asare is married to Mr Elhanan Owureku-Asare. She has mentored many female scientists and Girls in STEM in Ghana.

She likes to travel, swim, play golf and basketball. She worships at the Agape New Testament Church located at East Legon. She is a member of Joyfulway Incorporated, a leading Contemporary Gospel Music Ministry in Ghana.

== Awards and recognition ==
- African Women in Agricultural Research and Development Fellow
- 2012 recipient, Norman E. Borlaug International Agricultural Science and Technology scholarship award.
- 2015 Norman E. Borlaug Leadership Enhancement in Agriculture Program (LEAP)
- OWSD Early Career fellow
- 2020 Aspen New Voices fellow
