= Afi Azaratu Yakubu =

Ghanaian media personality

- Born: Northern Region of Ghana
- Citizenship: Ghanaian
- Occupation: media personality
- Known for: veteran media personality, documentary producer and an activist

Afi Azaratu Yakubu is a veteran media personality, documentary producer and an activist. For her work with peace and sustainable development issues in Africa in general and Ghana in particular, she received the 2006 Edberg Award in Sweden and the 2013 Martin Luther King Jr. Award for Peace and Social Justice.

== Early life and education ==
She was born in the Northern Region of Ghana. The Northern Region of Ghana has one of the highest levels of illiteracy and poverty in the country. She attended St. Francis Xavier University.

== Career ==
Afi Azaratu Yakubu has worked as a researcher, women's rights and peace advocate since 1994. She co-founded the Women United Against Conflict and the Savanna Women Development Foundation. She is also the founder and executive director for the Foundation for Security and Development in Africa (FOSDA), a local non-governmental organisation. Through FOSDA she has implemented a variety of projects focused on reducing threats to human safety and security in Ghana and across the West African sub-region. For instance, since 2000 FOSDA led a campaign on action against the misuse of small arms and light weapons in West Africa. She was appointed as the new Executive Secretary of Small Arms Commission.

== Awards ==
Yakubu's key works with women's rights and peace has earned her awards and recognition including:

- 2004 - Dagbon Personality of the year
- 2006 - Edberg Award in Sweden for her work with peace and sustainable development issues in Africa in general and Ghana in particular.
- 2013 - Martin Luther King Junior Award for Peace and Social Justice from the United States of America Embassy, in recognition for her work in promoting peace and security in the Northern Region of Ghana.
