= Kofi Adu Domfeh =

Ghanaian journalist and climate advocate

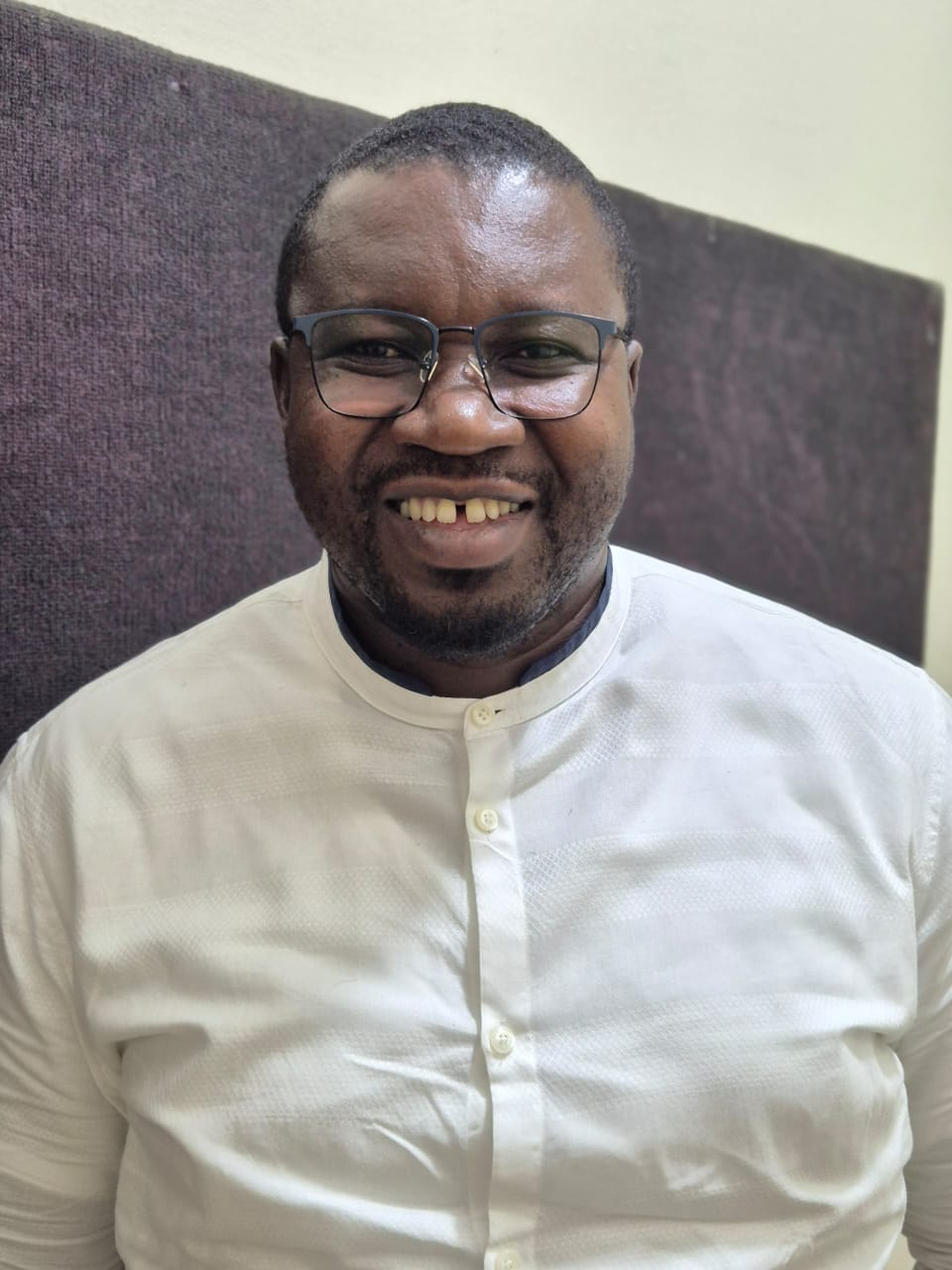
- Born: Kofi Adu Domfeh; July 21, 1978 (age 48); Kumasi
- Education: Kwame Nkrumah University of Science and Technology
- Occupation: Journalist
- Employer: Multimedia Group Limited
- Known for: Environmental journalism
- Website: https://www.myjoyonline.com/ and https://www.adomonline.com/

Kofi Adu Domfeh (born on 21 July, 1978) is a Ghanaian journalist, media trainer, and environmental advocate. He serves as the news editor for Multimedia Group Limited's Nhyira FM and Luv FM and heads the Science and Technology Desk. Since 2025, he has been serving as the Ghana Journalists Associtation's Ashanti Region Chairman.

== Early life and education ==
Domfeh is a native of Offinso in the Ashanti Region. He grew up in Kumasi, later moved to Nigeria, and eventually returned to Ghana. He holds a master's degree in Development Planning and Management, and a degree in Social Work and Sociology all from the Kwame Nkrumah University of Science and Technology (KNUST), obtained in 2014. He also studied Business Economics and Commerce at Cambridge International College in 2017, Journalism at the Nigerian Institute of Journalism in Ogba-Ikeja, and Advertising at the Institute of Business Management and Journalism. He is an alumnus of T.I. Ahmadiyya Senior High School.

== Career ==
He began his career as a business journalist at Luv FM and rose through the ranks to become an assistant editor. He later joined Media General, where he served as the Northern Sector Bureau Chief, before returning to the Multimedia Group Limited as the editor of its Kumasi branch (Nhyira FM and Luv FM).

Domfeh reports on agriculture, climate change, and related issues. He has also served as Ghana Correspondent for WRENmedia and is currently the Ghana Bureau Chief for AfricaClimateReports.com.

He has worked with Amnesty International on media and human rights training.

=== CLAP Gh ===
He founded the Climate Livelihoods and Agriculture Platform (CLAP Gh) in March 2020 as a collaborative initiative promoting community action on climate issues. The platform builds synergy among science, environment, and agriculture to address climate change and support sustainable development. It also contributes to efforts in climate mitigation and adaptation.

== Awards and recognition ==
Domfeh has won several awards. some of them include:

- He won the 2015 APO Energy Media Awards in Dubai, UAE
- He emerged Overall Winner in the 2015 IFEJ-Flamingo Awards for Business and Financial Journalism in Ghana
- In 2014, he won the African Climate Change and Environment Reporting (ACCER) Awards in Kenya

== Personal life ==
Kofi Adu Domfeh is married to Jennifer Asantewaa Domfeh, and they have two children.
