= Scofray Nana Yaw Yeboah =

Ghanaian author and speaker

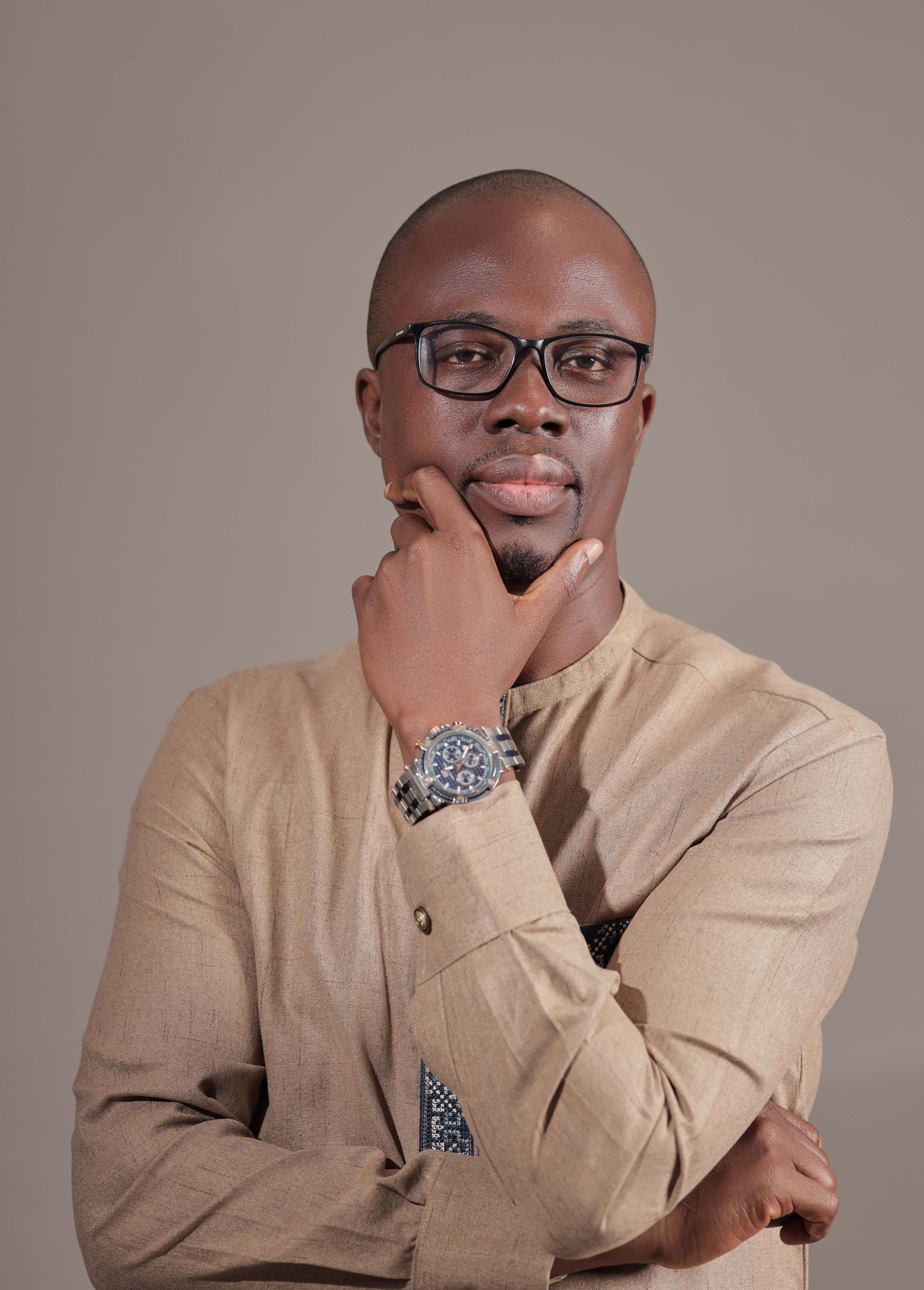
- Born: September 13, 1980 (age 46); Adweso, Eastern Region, Ghana
- Education: Institute of Commercial Management
- Occupations: Transformational Executive Coach, Writer and Author

Scofray Nana Yaw Yeboah (born 13 September 1980) is a Ghanaian transformational executive coach, writer, author, and columnist. He is also a media analyst and consultant. He is the president of the Ghana chapter of the International Coaching Federation. He is a member of the mBIT International. He is also a trained facilitator at the Institute of Healing Memories in Cape Town, South Africa. He was recognised as one of the Most Influential Young Ghanaians in 2015 and 2016.

== Early life ==
Scofray was born on September 13, 1980, at Adweso in the Eastern Region of Ghana. His father was Mr Ebenezer Yaw Otu and his mother, Victoria Abena Kwakyewaa. He comes from Akropong Akuapem in the Eastern Region of Ghana.

== Education ==
Scofray attended the St. Dominic's Catholic School in Adweso for his basic education in 1995.

From January 1996 to December 1998, he attended Koforidua Senior High Technical School in Koforidua, Ghana. He had served as the president of the old students association up until 2020. He proceeded to the City and Guilds of London Institute, where he studied microcomputer technology and electrical-electronics engineering. He is a certified professional trainer by IAPPD United Kingdom.

In May 2021, he obtained a certificate in ontological mindfulness and ecological coaching from Ideal Coaching Global, San Francisco, California-USA.

In 2022, he completed his certificate training in mBIT Master Coaching from the NeuroCoach Institute in South Africa. He holds Graduate Diploma in Management Studies and Advanced Diploma in Leadership studies from the Institute of Commercial Management (ICM) in UK. He is a member of National Society of Black Engineers.

== Career ==
Yeboah works in different fields like; he is a brand expert, corporate trainer and the lead consultant at Zoweh Global Consult. He has attained the Advanced Certification in Team Coaching (ACTC) credential from the International Coaching Federation. In 2024, he became the world's first black professional mBIT trainer in Africa.

Currently, he is the president of the International Coaching Federation (ICF), Ghana Chapter. The ICF is the largest professional coaching body in the world. In 2025, he became Ghana's first International Coaching Federation's (ICF) Master Certified Coach (MCC) with over 3500 hours of coaching.

== Awards and recognition ==
- He was honored as a fellow of Crans Montana Forum in 2019.
- Presently, he holds distinction of being the first black male mBIT Master Coach Master Coach in Africa.
- Yeboah was nominated in the Special Recognition category of the Africa Youth Award in 2016.
- Yeboah was recognized as the first Ghanaian and African to have graduated from Ideal Coaching Global in San Francisco, California in the USA.
- Yeboah was recognized as the first African OME Systemic Thinking Executive Coach, who has completed the Advanced Training for Executive Coaching.
- He was recognized as one of the Most Influential Young Ghanaians in 2015 and 2016.
- Yeboah has been recognized by Speakers Bureau Africa as one of Ghana's top 100 Speakers.

== Books ==
Scofray has authored four books and over 100 publications on various news platforms.

- Branding 360
- Art of Life
- Transformational Pearls
- Christian Corporate Model

=== Other publications ===
- Building a Corporate Coaching Culture using PASCAD core skills for resilience and job satisfaction
- Goal-Setting; the benefits of getting it done with a professional coach
- The fourth component lagging in women and youth empowerment in Africa
- Neuroscience and mBraining: A catalyst to influence the impact of emotional intelligence on leadership
- Leadership-Executive & Team Coaching: A Systemic Intervention to stimulate employee well-being and company growth
- Coaching impact on mastermind through mBraining for self-mastery and corporate growth (Part I)
- Language and our words:…birthing peak performance and growth
- Executive coaching impact and influence on strategic decision-making by C-suite
- Some Samaritans Worthy of Appreciation in little Isaac amputation story
- Coaching impact on job satisfaction, work-life balance, and customer experience
- Why great achievers hire coaches
- Midland Savings and Loans saga; The reality of Ghana's Customer Care Service
- Letter to Christiane Amanpour; The rage of Ghanaians was not against Moesha
- What happens when c-suites and chros lack emotional intelligence
- Why every 21st Century CEO and Leader must acquire
