= Elizabeth Wyns-Dogbe =

Ghanaian chartered insurer

- Citizenship: Ghanaian
- Occupation: Chartered Insurer
- Organization: SIC Life Insurance Company ( Managing Director)
- Known for: Leadership in Insurance Industry
- Awards: Female Traiblazer of African Insurance Industry (2019), Marketing woman of the year (2018)

Elizabeth Wyns-Dogbe is a Ghanaian chartered insurer and an associate member of The Chartered Insurance Institute UK. She was named one of the "Female Trailblazers of the African Insurance Industry" by the African Insurance Bulletin at the 2019 African Insurance Organization conference in South Africa. In 2018, she was honoured as the Marketing Woman of the Year by the Chartered Institute of Marketing Ghana.

== Education ==
Wyns-Dogbe graduated from the Kwame Nkrumah University of Science and Technology with a bachelor's degree in Materials Science and Engineering. She also holds a master's degree in Business Administration (Finance) from The Graduate School of Business of Central University College. She also holds a PhD in Theology from Immanuel Bible Institute and Seminary, Brooklyn in the United States.

== Career ==
Wyns-Dogbe is currently the managing director of SIC Life Insurance Company, a state-owned life insurer in Ghana. She was appointed into office in 2017. Prior to this, she worked as the general manager of UT Life Insurance and the life operations manager at KEK Insurance Brokers Limited.

== Personal life ==
She is a Christian and Reverend Minister with Jesus Generation Ministries.
