= Percy Sackey =

Percy Sackey (born 10 September 1993) is a Ghanaian teacher at Obo-Kwahu in the Eastern region of Ghana who became famous on Instagram for using dance as a medium to inspire his pupils. He is a songwriter, a singer, performer and an actor.

== Education ==
Sackey had his high school education at Mpraeso Senior High School in Kwahu. While in high school he was the entertainment prefect. He proceeded to Abetifi Teachers Training College in Kwahu where he had his teacher trainee education.

== Dancing Teacher ==
Sackey's video of him dancing with his students broke social media and earned him many likes and followers and article by BBC. He uses dance as a medium to encourage his pupils to be confident and build on their talent.
