= Ghana Music Awards =

Awards event in Ghana

- Current: 2024 Ghana Music Awards
- The VGMA plaque for the "Artist of the Year" (2020–2023)
- Awarded for: Outstanding work in the Ghanaian music industry
- Country: Ghana
- Presented by: CharterHouse
- First award: 1999; 27 years ago
- Website: https://ghanamusicawards.com/

Television/radio coverage
- Network: GHOne TV; GTV; TV3; Akwaaba Magic; Formerly: DStv Channel 155; GOtv Channel 110

The Ghana Music Awards, also known since 2024 by the sponsored name Telecel Ghana Music Awards (TGMAs), formerly Vodafone Ghana Music Awards (VGMAs), is an annual music awards event in Ghana established in 1999 by a local event organizer and planner company known as Charter House to originally and primarily celebrate the "outstanding contributions of Ghanaian musicians to the growth and expansion of its associated industry".

Usually held between April and June, the event is broadcast locally on GHOne TV, GTV and/or TV3 and outside Ghana on Akwaaba Magic on satellite TV platform DStv and terrestrial TV platform GOtv. Prior to the launch of the Akwaaba Magic channel in 2021, the event was broadcast outside Ghana on channels 155 and 198 on DStv and on channel 110 on GOtv.

== Trophy ==
The Ghana Music Awards trophy has been awarded in different forms over the years, with the current one unveiled before the 2019 edition of the event. It consists of a gold star-shaped plaque with a circular hole and strings on opposite faces, mimicking a guitar.

=== Artist of the Year ===
The Artist of the Year award is the highest and most prestigious of the awards given at the event given to the artist(s) adjudged by the CharterHouse, the GMA Board and the general public as having the highest audience appeal, radio play, online streaming and popularity. The artist(s) must have a released hit single or album during the year under review to be eligible. Past and present Artist of the Year award winners:

- 1999: Akyeame (Okyeame Quophi and Okyeame Kwame)
- 2000: Daddy Lumba
- 2001: Kojo Antwi
- 2002: Lord Kenya
- 2003: Kontihene
- 2004: V.I.P
- 2005: Bice Osei Kuffour
- 2006: Ofori Amponsah
- 2007: Samini
- 2008: Kwaw Kese
- 2009: Okyeame Kwame
- 2010: Sarkodie
- 2011: V.I.P
- 2012: Sarkodie
- 2013: R2Bees
- 2014: Shatta Wale
- 2015: Stonebwoy
- 2016: E.L
- 2017: Joe Mettle
- 2018: Ebony Reigns
- 2019: Unannounced (Cause by fight between Shatta Wale and Stonebowy) (Note: As a result of an ignition of a questionable brawl between the entourages of Stonebwoy and Shatta Wale.)
- 2020: Kuami Eugene
- 2021: Diana Hamilton
- 2022: KiDi
- 2023: Black Sherif
- 2024: Stonebwoy
- 2025: King Promise
- 2026: Black Sherif

== Locations ==
The inaugural ceremony in 1999 was held at the National Theatre of Ghana in Accra, and was held there until 2004, when it moved to the Accra International Conference Centre (AICC). With the exception of the 2010, 2011 and 2012 editions of the event, which were held at the Dome of the AICC, the event since the move to the AICC was held at its Main Hall until 2018. Since 2019, the event has been held at the Grand Arena (then/previously the New Dome) still at the AICC. The 2026 edition was scheduled to be held at the Palms Convention Centre within the La Palm Royal Beach Hotel. Organisers later changed the venue to the Grand Arena of the Accra International Conference Centre.

Ghana Music Awards dates and locations
#	Year	Date	Venue	Host(s)	Reference(s)
1	1999		National Theatre of Ghana	Kwami Sefa Kayi	
2	2001		National Theatre of Ghana	Kwami Sefa Kayi	
3	2002		National Theatre of Ghana	Kwami Sefa Kayi	
4	2003	8 March	National Theatre of Ghana	Kwami Sefa Kayi	
5	2004	13 March	National Theatre of Ghana	Kwami Sefa Kayi	
6	2005	1 May	National Theatre of Ghana	Kwami Sefa Kayi	
7	2006	4 March	National Theatre of Ghana	Kwami Sefa Kayi	
8	2007	6 May	National Theatre of Ghana	Kwami Sefa Kayi	
9	2008	25 April	National Theatre of Ghana	Samini and Doreen Andoh	
10	2009	4 April	Main Hall of the Accra International Conference Center (AICC)	Bice Osei Kuffour, Samini and Dentaa	
11	2010	10 April	Main Hall of the Accra International Conference Center (AICC)	Kwasi Kyei Darwkah (KKD)	
12	2011	25 February	Main Hall of the Accra International Conference Center (AICC)	Chris Attoh and Doreen Andoh	
13	2012	13 April	The Dome of the AICC	Chris Attoh and Benson Ohene Boateng	
14	2013	18 May	The Dome of the AICC	Mildred Ashong (Eazzy) and Kofi Okyere Darko (KOD)	
15	2014	26 April	The Dome of the AICC	Mildred Ashong (Eazzy) and Kofi Okyere Darko (KOD)	
16	2015	11 April	The Dome of the AICC	Nathaniel Attoh and Joselyn Dumas	
17	2016	7 May	The Dome of the AICC	Chris Attoh, Naa Ashorkor and DJ Black	
18	2017	8 April	The Dome of the AICC	Anita Erskine	
19	2018	15 April	The Dome of the AICC	John Dumelo & Berla Mundi	
20	2019	18 May	The New Dome/Grand Arena of the AICC	Kwami Sefa Kayi & Berla Mundi	
21	2020	28 & 29 August	The New Dome/Grand Arena of the AICC	Day 1 – Giovani Caleb & Sika Osei Day 2 – KOD & Berla Mundi	
22	2021	25 & 26 June	The New Dome/Grand Arena of the AICC	Day 1 – Giovani Caleb and AJ Akuoko-Sarpong Day 2 – Berla Mundi, Giovani Caleb and Sika Osei	
23	2022	9 April	The New Dome/Grand Arena of the AICC	AJ Akuoko-Sarpong	
24	2023	6 May	The New Dome/Grand Arena of the AICC	Berla Mundi	
25	2024	1 June	The New Dome/Grand Arena of the AICC	Chris Attoh and Naa Ashorkor	
26	2025	10 May	The New Dome/Grand Arena of the AICC	Naa Ashorkor (main host), AJ Sarpong (co-host), and Foster Romanus (co-host)	
27	2026	9 May	The New Dome/Grand Arena of the AICC	Naa Ashorkor, AJ Akuoko–Sarpong, Giovani Caleb and Godwin Namboh (red carpet), Regina Van Helvert (red carpet)	

== COVID-19 consequences ==
In 2020, the event's precursor, the nominees jam, scheduled for 4 April at Jackson Park in Koforidua, was initially postponed and then cancelled to comply with a national directive on public gathering due to the COVID-19 pandemic in Ghana.

== See also ==
- List of Ghanaian awards
