= 2023 Ghana Music Awards =

- Awarded for: Outstanding achievement in the Ghanaian music industry in 2022
- Sponsored by: Vodafone, Yango
- Date: May 6, 2023
- Venue: Grand Arena of the Accra International Conference Centre, Accra
- Country: Ghana
- Presented by: Naa Ashorkor; James Gardiner; Berla Mundi; Fiifi Coleman; Chrystal Kwame-Aryee
- Website: ghanamusicawards.com

Television/radio coverage
- Networks
- TV3 (within Ghana) (Note: Accessible outside Ghana via DStv and GOtv.); Akwaaba Magic (outside Ghana) (Note: Only accessible via DStv and GOtv.)
- Runtime: 3 hours 45 minutes

The 24th edition of the Vodafone Ghana Music Awards was held on the 6th May, 2023 at the Accra International Conference Centre (AICC) in the Grand Arena. The awards is to recognize the works of artiste in the year under review. The awards show was organized by Charter House and broadcast by TV3 as a locally partner in Ghana and international media outlets Akwaaba Magic.

== Performances ==
Artist(s)	Song(s)	Link(s)
Piesie Esther and All Stars	Wayε Me Yie Rendition with All Stars	
Kidi	Blessed, I Lied, Champagne	
DSL	Boys Pe Cho, Happy Day	
Epixode	Atia	
Lasmid	Friday Night	
Black Sherif	Sad Boys Don't Fold, Konongo Zongo, Oh Paradise, Soja	
Gyakie	Scar, Far Away, Something	
King Promise	Terminator, Baby I'm Jealous, Anadwo, Chop Life	
Ofori Amponsah	Hello Hello, Emmanuella, Otoolege, Odwo	
Sarkodie	No Pressure, Country side	
Pheelz	Finesse, Electricity	
Medikal	Scarce, Stubborn Academy	
Kwabena Kwabwena	Afraid To Lose You, Adult Music	

== Presenters ==
- Berla Mundi
- James Gardiner
- Naa Ashorkor
- Fiifi Coleman
- Chrystal Kwame-Aryee

== Winners and nominees ==
This is the list of winners for the 2023 edition of the event.

Artiste of the Year	Best New Artiste of the Year
Black Sherif; Stonebwoy; Sarkodie; King Promise; Camidoh; Kidi; Piesie Esther; Joe Mettle	Lasmid; Djay; Malcom Nuna; Jay Bhad (disqualified); Ewuraabena; Dj Azonto; Chief One
Best Hiplife Song of the Year	International Collaboration of the Year
Friday Night – Lasmid; Stubborn Academy – Medikal; Anadwo – Jay Bahd; Abonten – DJ Breezy ft Kwesi Authur, Mugeez, Stonebwoy, Black Sherif & Smallgod; Grace – Amerado ft. Lasmid; Ewiase – Kweku Flick; Labadi – Sarkodie ft King Promise	Sugarcane Rmx– Camidoh ft. King Promise & Mayokun; Touch it Remix – Kidi ft Tyga; Ten Toes – King Promise ft. Omah Lay; Blessed – Kidi ft. Mavado; Dumebi – MzVee ft. Yemi Alade; Run to you – King Promise ft Chance the Rapper & Vic Mensa; Better days – Sarkodie ft. Buju
Best Afropop Song	Best Highlife Song
Therapy – Stonebwoy; Survivor – Wendy Shay; Oil in my head – Black Sherif; Gboza – Dopenation; Ten toes – King Promise ft Omah Lay; Take away – Kuami Eugene; Blessed – Kidi ft Movado; Thank you – Fameye	Down flat – Kelvyn Boy; Atia –Epixode ft Kwabena Kwabena; My Proposal AK – Songstress; Adi Dede – Adina; Adom – Kwesi Authur; Have Mercy – Kofi Kinaata
Best Afrobeats Song	Afrobeats/Afropop Artiste of the Year
Sugarcane Rmx – Camidoh ft King Promise & Mayokun; Something – Gyakie; Champagne – Kidi; Balance it – Djay; Ginger – King Promise; Jo – FBS ft Mr. Drew	King Promise; Camidoh; Gyakie; Kidi; Wendy Shay; Kelvyn Boy
Best Collaboration of the Year	Unsung Act
Country side – Sarkodie ft Black Sherif; Jo – FBS ft Mr Drew; Atiaa – Epixode ft Kwabena Kwabena; Grace – Amerado ft Lasmid; Abonten – DJ Breezy ft Kwesi Authur, Mugeez, Stonebwoy, Black Sherif & Smallgod; Tegbe Tegbe – Bethel Revival Choir ft Edwin Dadson; Labadi – Sarkodie ft King Promise	DSL; Niashun; Aya Ramzy; Tsa Qa; Maya Blu; Boi Jake
Best Gospel Artiste	Audio Engineer of the Year
Piesie Esther; Joe Mettle; Perez Muzik; Diana Hamilton; Celestine Donkor; MOG Music	Far Away – Altra Nova: Yaa Asantewaa – Chopz; Beginning Again – Qube; Hewale lala – Perez Muzik; Therapy – Supa Dups; Country Side – Possigee; Far Away – Altra Nova
Best Reggae/Dancehall Song	Best Highlife Artiste
Atia - Epixode; A Go dey – Konkara Jahvybz ft Kelvyn Boy; 33N1 – Raskuuku; Don’t forget me – Black Sherif; Never Bow Down ft Blvk H3ro – Rocky Dawuni; Eyes on you – Maccasio ft Stonebwoy	Kofi Kinaata; Akwaboah; Kuami Eugene; Abiana
Best Reggae/ Dancehall Artiste	Best Music Video
Stonebwoy; Raskuuku; Rocky Dawuni; Epixode; Samini	Konogo Zongo – Black Sherif; Therapy – Stonebwoy; Waye me yie – Piesie Esther; Gidigba – Stonebwoy; Labadi – Sarkodie ft King Promise; Touch it Rmx – Kidi ft Tyga; Best Side – Scott Evans; Afraid to lose you – Kwabena Kwabena
Record of the Year	Song writer of the Year
Far away – Gyakie; Yaa Asantewaa – King Promise ft Frenna; Beginning Again – Adomaa; Hewale lala – Perez Muzik; Therapy – Stonebwoy; Country Side – Sarkodie ft Black Sherif	Hewale lala – Perez Muzik; Piesie Esther – Waye me yie; Paradise – Black sheriff; Thank You – Fameye; My Meditation – Diana Hamilton; This Far – Ewurabena
Best Male Vocal Performance	Best Hiplife/HipHop Artiste of the Year
Perez Muzik; Camidoh; Kyei Mensah; Stonebwoy; King Promise	Sarkodie; Black Sherif; Kwesi Arthur; Kofi Jamar; Medikal; Amerado; Strongman
Best African Artiste of the Year	Best Afrobeats/Afropop Artiste Nominees
Asake; Arya Star; Burnaboy; Kizz Daniel; Libianca; The Therapist	King Promise; Camidoh; Gyakie; Kidi; Wendy Shay; Kelvyn Boy
Producer of the Year	Best Female Vocal Performance
Mog Beatz; Atown; Phantom; Shadrach Yawson; Guilty Beatz; Kill Beatz; Liquid Beatz; Samnsey	Niella; Piese Esther; Enuonyam; Cina Soul; Abiana; Adomaa
Vodafone Most Popular Song of the Year	Best Rap Performance Nominees
Kweku the traveller – Black Sherif; Sugarcane Rmx – Camidoh ft King Promise & Mayokun; Country Side – Sarkodie ft Black Sherif; Friday Night – Lasmid; Down flat – Kelvyn Boy; Something – Gyakie; Survivor – Wendy Shay; Blessed – Kidi ft. Mavado; Therapy – Stonebwoy; Waye me yie – Piesie Esther	Obiaa boa - Amerado; Scarface – Medikal; Goated – Strongman; 5 August 6 – Lyrical Joe; Teephlow – 6feet
Best Hip-hop Song	Album of the Year
Kwaku The Traveller – Black Sherif; Amerado – Obiaa boa; Sarkodie – Country side ft Black Sherif; Malcolm Nuna -Benzo; Kwesi Authur – Drama; Medikal – Scarface	5 Star – King Promise; The Villain I Never Was – Black Sherif; Jamz – Sarkodie; My Diary – Gyakie; Son of Jacob – Kwesi Authur; The Kadosh – Joe Mettle
Best Gospel Song of The Year	
Wayε Me Yie – Piesie Esther; My Meditation – Diana Hamilton; Kadosh – Joe Mettle; Hewale Lala – Perez Muzik; Tegbe Tegbe – Bethel Revival Choir (Edwin Dadson); This Far – Awura Abena; Mala – MOG Music; Final Say – Celestine Donkor	
