= Andoh =

Andoh is a surname. Notable people with the surname include:

- Adjoa Andoh (born 1963), British actress
- Ama Pomaa Andoh (born 1975), Ghanaian politician
- Brite Andoh (born 1999), Ghanaian footballer
- Chief Kweku Andoh (1836–1898), British colonial army officer
- Dominic Kodwo Andoh (1929–2013), Ghanaian Roman Catholic archbishop
- Doreen Andoh, Ghanaian radio personality
- Enoch Andoh (born 1993), Ghanaian footballer
- Frank Andoh (born 1986), Ghanaian footballer
