= AJ Akuoko-Sarpong =

Ghanaian media personality (born 1991)

Akuoko-Sarpong
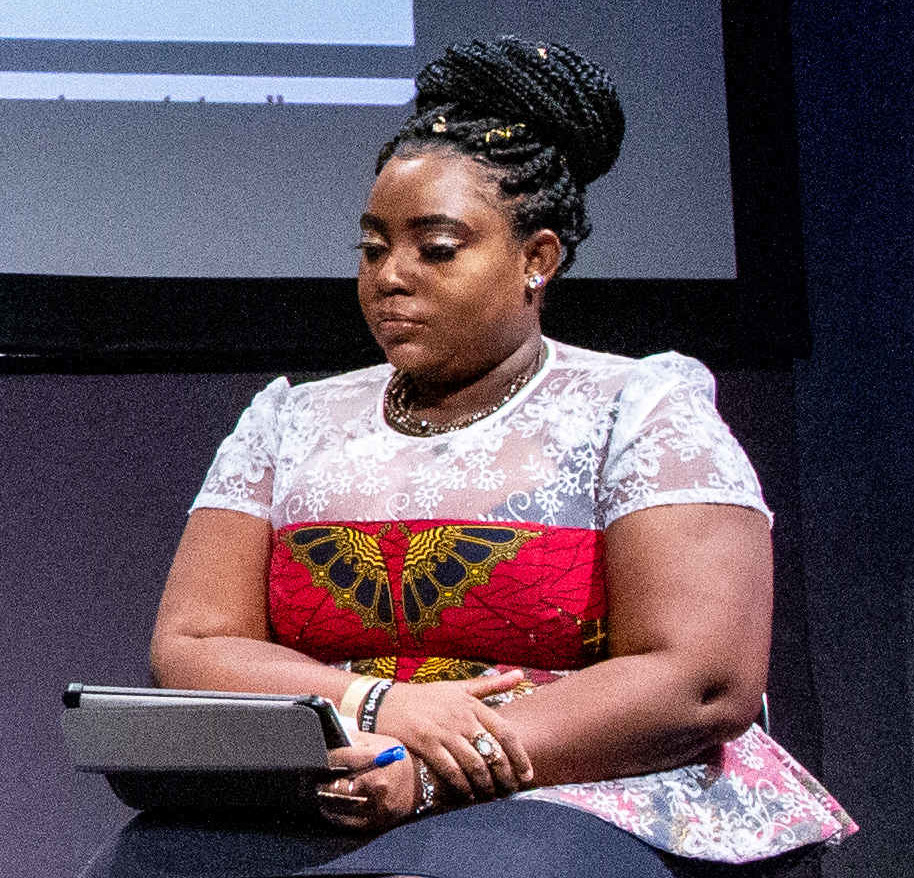
- Akuoko-Sarpong at Re publica 19 in 2019
- Born: October 28, 1991 (age 34)
- Other name: AJ Sarpong
- Citizenship: Ghanaian
- Education: University of Ghana; Ghana Institute of Management and Public Administration
- Occupation: Broadcaster
- Employer: Media General
- Organization: TV3

Nana Adjoa Akuoko-Sarpong, also known as AJ Akuoko-Sarpong (born 28 October 1991), is a Ghanaian media personality who currently works for Media General owners of TV3 Ghana and its affiliates. She formerly worked for Citi FM and TV. She is also an event compere, content producer and developer, and voice-over artist.

== Early life ==
AJ Akuoko Sarpong was born to Nana Kwame Akuoko-Sarpong, the paramount chief of the Agogo Traditional Area and Omanhene of the Agogo Traditional Area and Alice Afful Asamah as the last of 15 children. She grew up in Ghana and the UK.

She hails from Asante Akyem Agogo in the Ashanti Region of Ghana.

== Education ==
Akuoko-Sarpong started her education at Sacs Kindergarten; from there, she went on to Alsyd Academy, later to Englebert School —in Accra, the capital of Ghana.

She moved to Akosombo International in the Eastern Region and later to Galaxy International School, where she changed from the Ghanaian system of education to the Cambridge System of the United Kingdom. She was home schooled for her A levels.

Akuoko-Sarpong received her first degree in Political Science and Theatre Arts from the University of Ghana, Legon.

She holds two master's degree; the first is on Master's Degree in Journalism from the Ghana Institute of Journalism; and her second master's degree at the University of Professional Studies, Accra (UPSA) with a master's degree in Brands and Communication Management.

== Career ==
Akuoko-Sarpong has over 13 years of experience in television and radio production and presentation, as well as event production, MCing, and media concept development.

=== Time at ghanamusic.com, YFM and EIB Network ===
AJ began her career working at Ghanamusic.com, where she took on the responsibilities of associate editor and on-air presenter for the website's events coverage. She was the host of the weekly music countdown show as well as interviewed many stars such as award-winning rapper and actor Ludacris, American music star Lloyd, British rap sensations Sway and Donae, South African music group Jozi, Nigerian Sensations D'banj, D'prince, Wande Coal, 2face Idibia, Neato-C, YQ, Int. Deejay Neptune, Ikechwuku, K-Switch, Desmond Elliot, Ramsey Nouah, Steele, Lynxx, Dede Mabiake, DenreleEdun, Dj Exclusive and many others. Also, this includes Ghanaian acts ranging from Samini, Sarkodie to Ghanaian hip-life legend, Reggie Rockstone, at many events across the years.

Whilst at Ghana music.com, she also worked at YFM Ghana from 2010 to 2014 as a Friday night segment presenter, amongst a myriad of part time industry based jobs.

After the merger of GHOne TV into the EIB Networks in 2015, she worked with the EIB Networks specifically, Starr FM, Live FM and GHOne TV as a presenter, producer and host of the Weekly Girl Talk Show, Tales from the Powder Room, Live from the Capital Radio Show on Live FM amongst many other shows across the network.

She continued working in lifestyle and entertainment, hosting a daily entertainment segment on GH One TV's morning show until Jan 2017, and later on its radio counterpart, Starr FM's Mid-Morning show, The Zone with Naa Ashorkor. She was also the host of the award-winning talk show “Tales from the Powder Room” on GHOne — a program that sparked conversations around social issues women face in their everyday lives. On the radio front, she hosted the show *Live from the Capital*, where she engaged in candid, unconventional conversations with African celebrities.

AJ has been a content producer since 2014 and in her role as content producer for the then independent GHOne TV, she was required to build bespoke TV shows and content for the channel's growing and demanding viewership, with her key role being to ensure that each show would resonate with the African viewer while meeting international standards. She has produced shows such as Tales from the Powder Room, Friday Night Live, as well as assisted in the production of reality shows such as ‘It Takes Two,’ Miss Maliaka Beauty Pageant, and "Guess Who’s Coming for Dinner Cooking" among others. And also for radio, she produced two seasons of the highly successful, female empowerment Radio Program and event, The Starr Woman Project for Starr 103.5 FM. She went on to develop shows at EIB, such as 12 Days of Christmas TV Show, NX Entertainment Segment on GH Today Breakfast Show.

=== Time at Citi FM/TV ===
Before joining Citi FM in 2017, she was a presenter with EIB Network where he hosted Tales from the Powder Room on GHOne TV. As of August 2021 she, works as a broadcast journalist at Citi FM and Citi TV.

After 5 years as Senior Presenter and Producer at GHONE TV and 2 Years at EIB Networks in 2017, she moved to the Citi Breakfast Show on Citi FM with Bernard Avle. After a year on the Citi CBS, she progressed to host the mid-morning show “Brunch in the Citi” in 2018 on Citi FM, every weekday from 10 a.m. to 2 p.m.

She once hosted Hall of Fame on Citi TV and syndicated on ABN TV in London and the Host of Music Reality Show, Voice Factory on Citi TV. She was also the Host of the Chat on Citi TV. She is currently the host of Ghana's longest running relationship talk show in Ghana, Sister Sister on Citi TV.

AJ has also being an event MC, and she has hosted a number of events, including Ghana Music Honor 2017, Ghana Events Awards 2017, Ghana Music Awards Red Carpet 2018, December to Remember Concert 2017/2018, Miss Communicator 2017, DSTV I Factory Showcase, IPMC 25th Anniversary, First Choice 20th Anniversary, the Office of the 2nd Lady of Ghana in collaboration with UNFPthe A Dinner against SGBV, Enteand the rtainment Achievement Awards 2021, among others.

=== Time at Media General ===
AJ currently works with Media General owners of TV3 Ghana, 3FM, Onua FM and other affiliates after she left Citi FM and TV in 2023.

== Honours and awards ==
In early 2017, Sarpong was honored by students of the Elizath Sey Frances Hall of the University of Ghana, Legon.
