= 2016 Ghana Music Awards =

- Date: July 5, 2016
- Location: Accra International Conference Center; Accra, Ghana
- Country: Ghana
- Hosted by: Chris Attoh
- Acts: Wizkid; Sarkodie; Stonebwoy; E.L; R2Bees
- Most awards: E.L

Television/radio coverage
- Network: GHOne TV

The 2016 Ghana Music Awards was the 17th edition of the Ghana Music Awards which was held on May 7, 2016, at the Accra International Conference Center in Accra, Ghana and was hosted by Chris Attoh, DJ Black and Naa Ashorkor. E.L was the biggest winner at the event, taking home a total of five awards including the coveted 'Artiste of the Year' with Sarkodie and Bisa Kdei won four awards each. These musicians, alongside Stonebwoy, Efya, R2Bees, Wizkid, Joe Mettle and Adomaa, performed at the event.

== Performers ==
The following artistes performed at the 2016 Ghana Music Awards:

- Sarkodie
- Wizkid
- Stonebwoy
- Efya
- Joe Mettle
- Adomaa
- Bisa Kdei
- Kofi Kinaata
- E.L

== Nominees and winners ==
Below is the list of winners for the popular music categories.

- Artiste of the Year – E.L
- Afropop Song of the Year – "Minaa Bo Po" by E.L
- Hiplife/Hip Hop Artiste of the Year – E.L
- Producer of the Year – E. L
- Music video of the Year – Shelele by E.L
- Hip Hop Song of the Year – Hand to Mouth by Sarkodie
- Rapper of the Year – Sarkodie
- Record of the Year – Sarkodie ft. Pat Thomas – Bra
- Reggae/Dancehall Artiste of the Year – Stonebwoy
- Reggae/Dancehall Song of the Year – Go Higher by Stonebwoy
- Highlife Artiste of the Year – Bisa Kdei
- Highlife Song of the Year – Mansa by Bisa Kdei
- Most Popular Song of the Year – Mansa by Bisa Kdei
- Album of the Year – Bisa Kdei
- Best Group of the Year – VVIP
- Collaboration of the Year – VVIP ft Sena Dagadu
- SongWriter of the Year – Kofi Kinaata
- Best New Artiste of the Year – Kofi Kinaata
- Gospel Song of the Year – Nicholas Omane Acheampong (Aposor)
- Hiplife Song of the Year – "Yewo Krom" by Atom
- Gospel Artiste of the Year – SP Kofi Sarpong
- Best Female Vocalist of the Year – MzVee
- Best Male Vocalist of the Year – Pat Thomas
- African Artiste of the Year – Wizkid
- Peace Song Winner – New Generation Gospel Ministers
- Traditional Artiste of the Year – Tesa Music Group
- Lifetime Achievement Award – AB Crentsil
- Sound Engineer of the Year – Kaywa
- Music for Development Award – Gasmilla
- Instrumentalist of the Year – Justice Williams (Shikome)
