= List of programs broadcast by TV3 (Ghana) =

List of Activities

This is a list of television programs currently and formerly broadcast by the Ghanaian television channel TV3.

== Current programming ==
Show name	Host	Premiere date	Production house	Ref
Date Rush (season 6)	Giovani Caleb; Anita Akua Akuffo	3 January 2022	Adesa Production Limited	
Family Feud (season II)	Steve Harvey	31 April 2020	Rapid Blue	
Sport Station	Thierry Nyann	2011	TV3 Production	
Talented Kidz	Dj Switch; Mara Yayra; Nakeeyat Dramani	31 January 2021	TV3 Production	
New Day	Bella Mundi; Mzgee	2019	TV3 Production	
Music Music	Chrystal Kwame Aryee	1 May 2021	TV3 Production	
The Day Show	Bella Mundi	2019	TV3 Production	

== Former programming ==
=== Children ===
Year	Show
2011-2016	LazyTown
2011-2016	Ben 10
2011-2016	Generator X
2011-2016	Barney & Friends
2011-2016	The Lion King's Timon & Pumbaa
2011-2016	Conan the Adventurer
2011-2016	Teen Wolf
2011-2016	Betty's Voyage
2011-2016	Aladdin
2011-2016	Power Rangers
2011-2016	Max Steel
2011-2016	Tommy and Oscar
2011-2016	Cedric the Crow

=== Series ===
Year	Show	Ref
2018	Desperate Housewives	
2021	Black Money Love	
2020	Wildflower	

=== Reality ===
Year	Show	Ref
2021–present	Date Rush	
2007-2021	Ghana's Most Beautiful	
2012-2021	MTN Hitmaker	
