= Anita Erskine =

Ghanaian TV and radio presenter

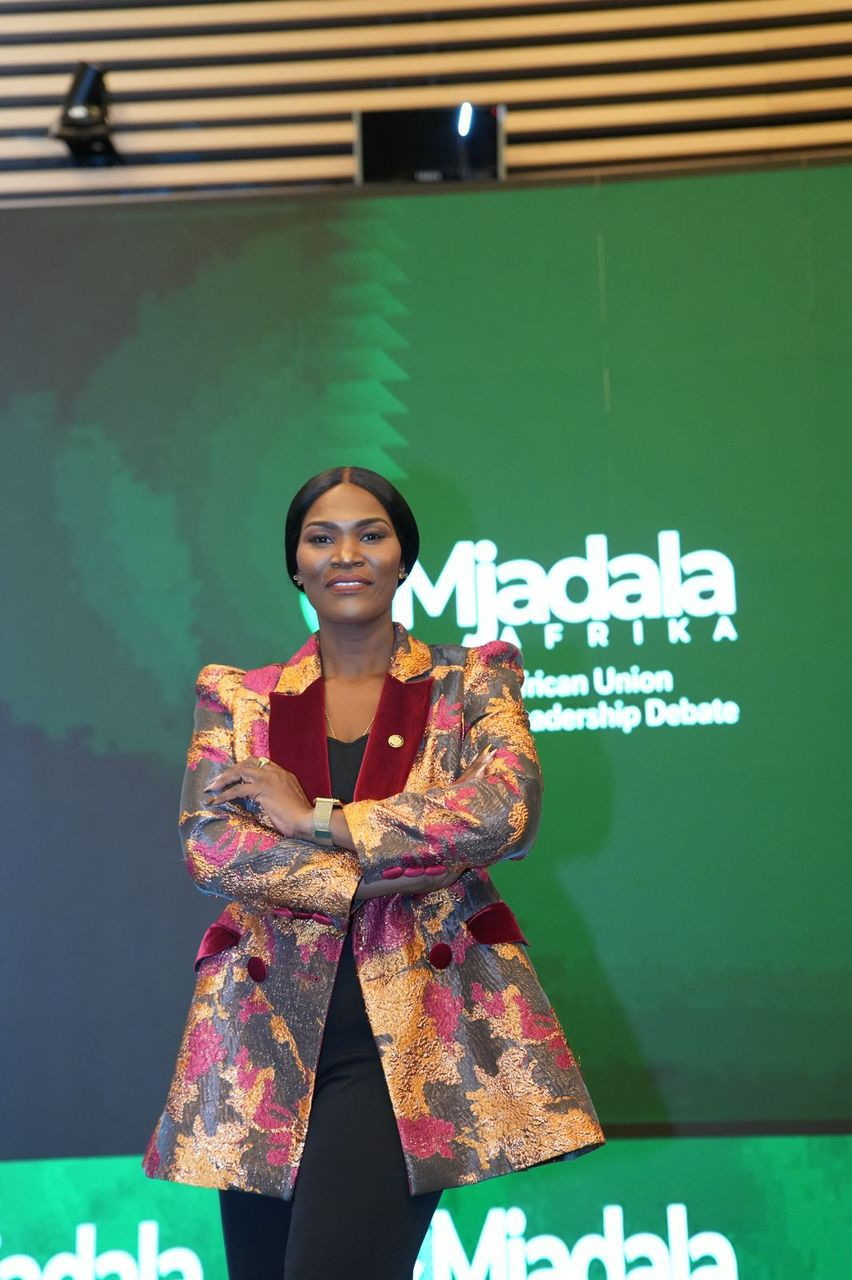
- Erskine as moderator of the African Union's Mjadala Afrika Leadership Debate 2024
- Born: Anita M. V. Erskine; 3 December 1978; Jerusalem, Israel
- Citizenship: Ghana
- Education: McMaster University; Trent University
- Occupations: Media and communications entrepreneur, broadcaster, talk show host
- Years active: 1998–present
- Notable work: Anita Erskine's Sheroes, formerly Sheroes of Our Time
- Children: 2
- Parents: Lt. Gen. Emmanuel Erskine (father); Rose Anastasia Erskine (mother)
- Website: www.theanitaerskine.com

Anita Erskine (born Vered - Marian Anita Erskine; 3 December 1978) is a Ghanaian media and communications entrepreneur, broadcaster, and talk show host who broadcasts in both English and French. She is also a professional compère, actress and girls' education advocate. She is the executive producer and host of Anita Erskine's Sheroes (formerly Sheroes of Our Time), which airs on the Anita Erskine Network on YouTube, and also on Akwaaba Magic on DSTV. She is the official host and an advisor of Africa's Business Heroes (formerly Africa Netpreneur Prize Initiative), the Jack Ma Foundation's flagship philanthropic entrepreneur program in Africa.

== Early life and education ==
Erskine was born in Jerusalem, Israel, to former Ghanaian soldier and politician, Lieutenant General Emmanuel Erskine and Rose Anastasia Erskine. She was raised in Ghana, and in her late teens moved to Canada.

She had her primary education at Christ the King International School and her secondary education at Ghana International School. Erskine holds a master's degree in Communications Management from McMaster University in Hamilton, Ontario, Canada, and a bachelor's degree in Cultural Studies from Trent University in Peterborough, Ontario, Canada.

== Career ==
Erskine's first TV show appearance on Ghanaian TV was in 1998, when she hosted the Bold and Beautiful Omnibus talk show on Metro TV. In Canada, she worked as an administrative assistant and then as a radio show host at FLOW 93.5 in Toronto. In 2006, she became the host of TV3's Mentor. After an audition in 2007, she became the Ghanaian correspondent for MNET's Studio 53. Later in 2009, while on maternity leave, she started to work at Viasat 1 in Ghana as the lead producer for the station's own programming. Upon her exit from Viasat 1 and Modern African Productions, she became the host of Ifactory Live's Pamper Your Mum, Cooking With and Making of a Mogul.

Between 2007 and early 2009, Erskine was the corporate communications director of Tigo (owned by Millicom), taking roles in Ghana and the Democratic Republic of Congo.

She came back to Viasat 1 to host The One Show in 2014. At the same time, she also hosted +233 Discovery, which was developed by the Discovery Learning Alliance – now Impact Ed International.

In 2015, she became the co-host for Accra-based Starr FM's Starr Drive with Bola Ray and then with Giovani Caleb. She resigned from the group in November 2017 to focus on building her social impact initiatives and strategic communications firm.

In June 2016, she founded her communications consultancy, Erskine Global Communications (formerly Anita Erskine Media). She created one subsidiary, Bosslady Productions.

Since 2020, Erskine has worked as a communications specialist to promote global awareness and policy change toward sustainable development through speaking engagements and event hosting. She has hosted high-level dialogues, international conferences, summits, award ceremonies, product launches, and diplomatic receptions. Her notable appearances include the Mjadala Afrika Leadership Debate 2024 at the African Union headquarters, the African Continental Free Trade Area (AfCFTA) Business Forum in Kigali, the Qatar Africa Business Forum in Marrakech, the ECOWAS Bank for Investment and Development Business Forum in Lomé, and the Global Financing Facility at UNGA 79 in New York. She has also hosted the Afreximbank Group annual meetings and the AfriCaribbean Trade and Investment Forum in Nassau.

== Host and moderator roles ==
- Co-moderator – African Union’s Mjadala Afrika Leaders Debate 2024 – Addis Ababa
- Co-host – Qatar Africa Business Forum 2024 – Marakech
- Host – GUBA Awards 2024 – London
- Host – Black Star Awards – New York
- Moderator – ECOWAS Investment Bank President’s Roundtable – Accra
- Host – 5G Launch – Accra
- Moderator – GITEX GLOBAL Fintech Surge – Dubai
- Host – AfCFTA’s Biashara Afrika – Kigali
- Host – Forward Africa Leaders Symposium – New York
- Host – How Countries are Reimagining and Renewing Global Commitments to Primary Health Care – New York
- Co-host – Rebranding Africa Awards Gala – Brussels
- Host – Digital With Purpose Summit – Cascais
- Host – EurAfrican Forum – Cascais
- Host – SDGs Action Summit – Accra
- Moderator – 31st Afreximbank Annual Meetings (AAM2024) – Nassau
- Host – Afreximbank Pan African Finance Awards – Nassau
- Moderator – GITEX Africa – Marakech
- Moderator – 3i Summit – Accra
- Co-host – Opening and closing ceremonies for 13th All African Games – Accra
- Co-host – Africa Prosperity Dialogues Presidential Dialogues – Ghana

== Awards ==
- 2024 Avance Media, 100 Most Influential African Women
- GUBA Award for Iconic Voice in Media and Advocacy – 2024
- Top 20 LinkedIn Creators – Ghana 2024
- Top 100 Career Women Africa in 2024
- The 50 Most Impactful Voices 2023
- 100 Most Influential Women in Africa
- 100 Most Inspirational Women in Ghana
- 100 Most Influential People in Ghana
- POWER INFLUENCER : Who is Who in Ghana
- Radio and TV Personality (RTP) – Radio Female Presenter of the Year (2017)
- Outstanding Contribution To Women Empowerment – 40 under 40 2017
- Protector of Women and Girl Child Rights Award – African Women Intercultural Dialogue 2017
- Women Mean Business Honors - Legendary Award Winner – 2016
- TV Hostess of the Year – City People Awards – 2015
- TV Female Entertainment Host of the Year 2014 – Radio and TV Personality (RTP)
- Best Supporting Actress – Ghana Movie Awards 2012
- Best Actress – Ghana Movie Awards 2013
- Best Supporting Actress – Ghana Movie Awards 2014
