= Harold Amenyah =

Ghanaian actor, TV personality, Businessman

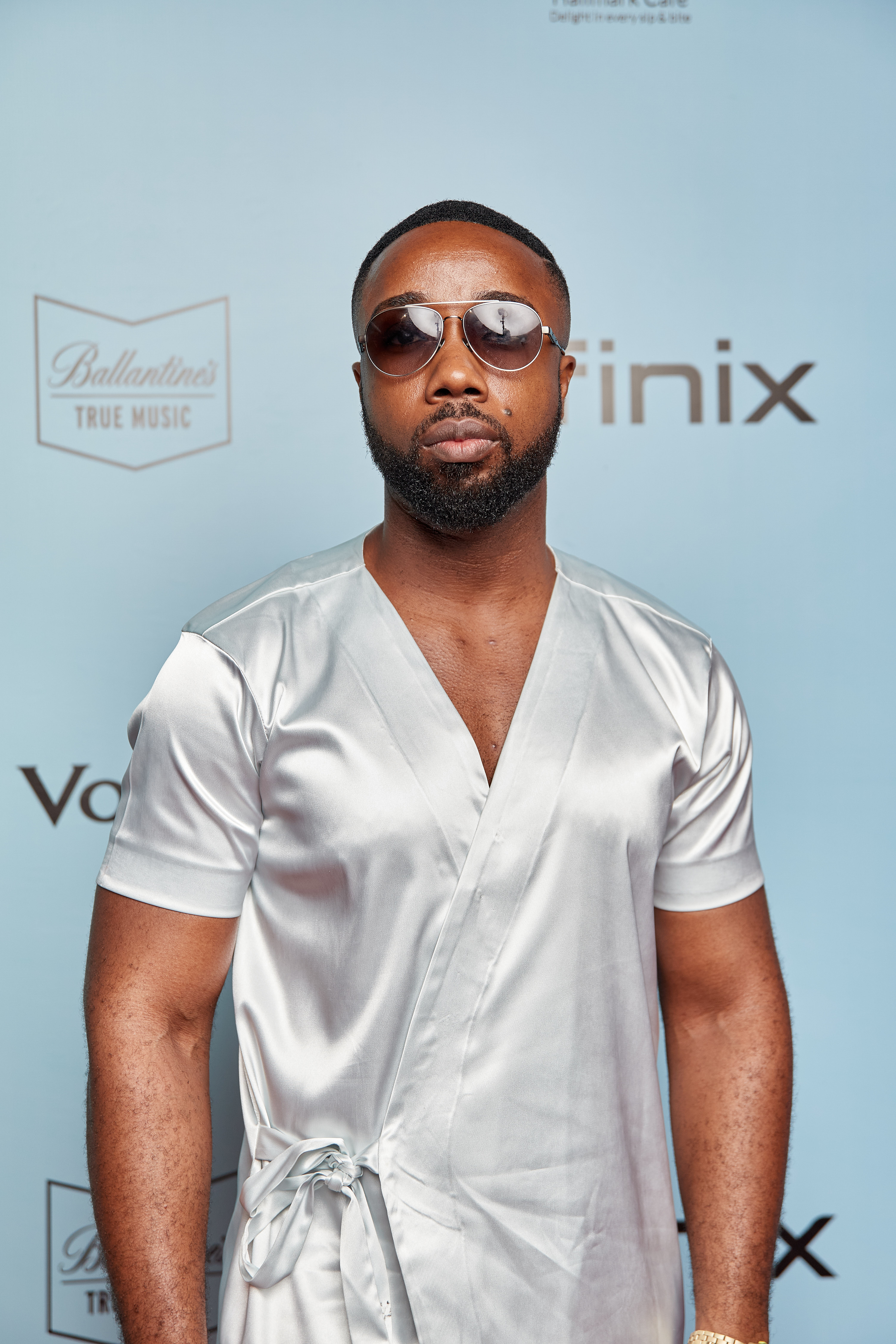
- Born: Harold Amenyah; Osu in Accra, Ghana
- Citizenship: Ghanaian
- Education: University of Ghana, Mfantsipim School
- Occupations: actor, fashion icon, tv personality, tv host, businessman
- Years active: 2012–present
- Known for: Xoxo, Sadia, A Sting in a Tale, 4play Reloaded, Wedding night, etc
- Notable work: Xoxo, Sadia
- Awards: 2015 Ghana Movie awards winner of Best dressed male celebrity, 2018 Ghana Movie awards Nominee of Supporting actor in a Drama, 2018 EMY awards Nominee of man of the year
- Website: Official website

Harold Amenyah is a Ghanaian actor, TV personality, Fashion icon, TV Host and Businessman who has worked as a brand influencer for popular brands including telecommunication giant Tigo.

== Education ==
Amenyah was born at Osu in Accra, Ghana, he schooled at Mfantsipim School for his secondary education. He then moved on to University of Ghana where he studied and earned a bachelor's degree in Economics and Mathematics.

== Career ==
He made his acting debut starring in a 2012 TV series " Xoxo".

Amenyah moved on to feature in several Ghanaian movies and series both in Akan and English such as Xoxo, 4play Reloaded, Honour my tears, A Sting in a Tale, Wedding Night, Every Woman Has A Story, Sadia and Eden. Amenyah became a household name after his commercial for Telecommunication company, Tigo debuted " Drop that Yam" which also featured Ghanaian actress Naa Ashorkor.

In 2019, through the Ministry of Tourism, Arts and Culture and a Barbados movie production company, Amenyah and other Ghanaian actors were selected to star in a Year of return 2019 movie titled "Joseph". He played the character Nii.

== Selected filmography ==
=== Films ===
- A Sting in a Tale (2009)
- 4play Reloaded (2010)
- Anniversary (2015)
- Honour my tears (2015)
- Every Woman Has A Story (2015)
- Wedding night (2016)
- Joseph (2019)

=== Television ===
- 2012, Xoxo (Ghanaian TV series)
- 2017, Sadia (Ghanaian TV series)
- 2020, Eden (Ghanaian TV series)
- 2023, Every Woman Has a Story
- 2024, 13 Kinds of Women

== Awards ==
- 2015 Ghana Movie Awards – Winner of Best Dressed Male

Celebrity

- 2018 Ghana Movie Awards – Nominee of Supporting Actor in a Drama

Series

- 2018 EMY Africa Awards – Nominee of Man of the Year Style

category
