= Public Property =

Public Property may refer to:

- Public property, property that is dedicated to public use
- Public Property (play), a 2009 play by Sam Peter Jackson
- Public Property (film), a 2017 film directed by Tope Alake and Ashionye Michelle Raccah
