= DJ Switch (Ghanaian DJ) =

Ghanaian disc jockey (born 2007)

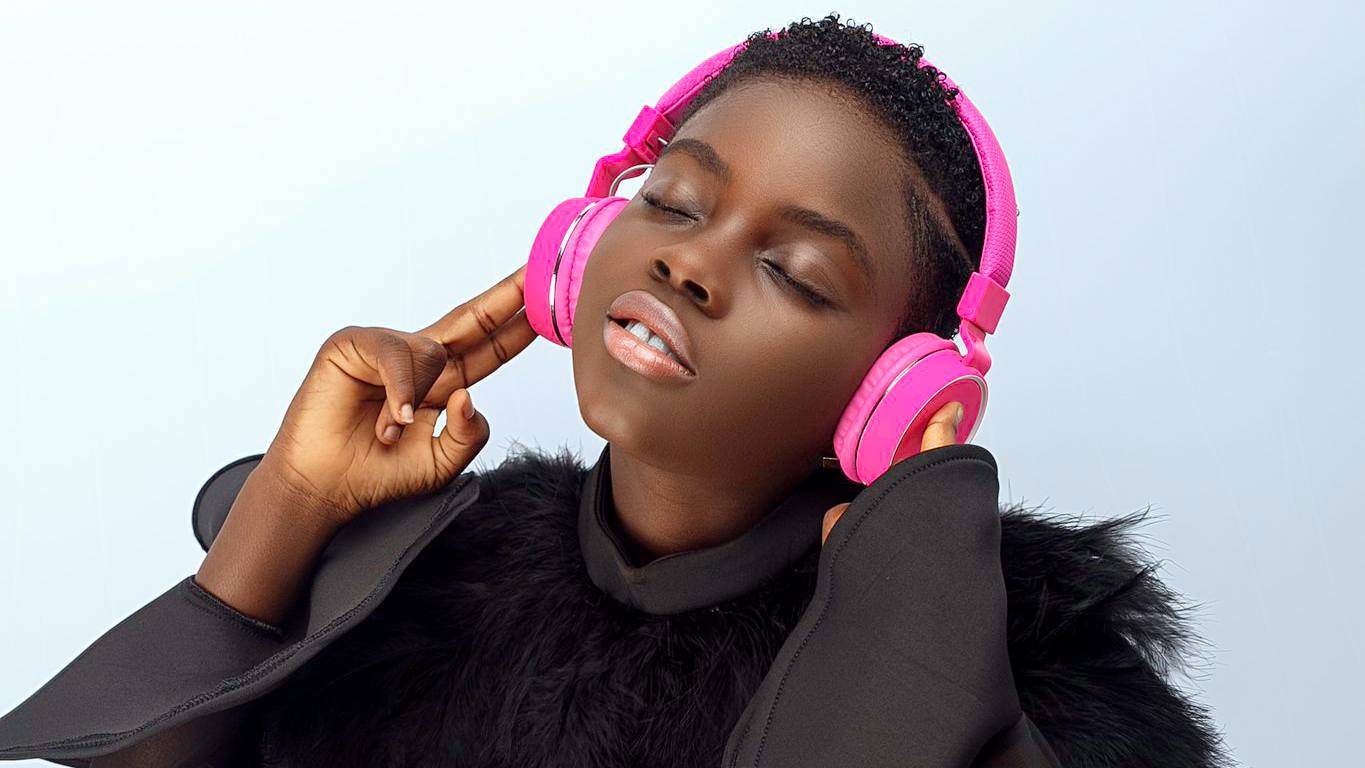
- Born: 12 December 2007 (age 18); Dadieso, Western Region, Ghana
- Occupations: Dancer; singer; motivational speaker; disc jockey; poet; actress
- Years active: 2017–present

Erica Armah Bra-Bulu Tandoh (born December 12, 2007) known by the stage name DJ Switch, is a young Ghanaian disc jockey.

== Biography ==
She is an entertainer who sings, raps, dances and hosts TV shows. She currently hosts Talented Kidz program on TV3. She does poetry, is an actress and delivers motivational speeches.

She is the second child and the only girl among five siblings. She hails from Dadieso in the Western North Region of Ghana and attends Talented Royals International School at Weija in Accra.

Her career took off when she was seven years of age. She claims she is adept at switching people's moods from sad to happy, hence the name DJ Switch.

In June 2018, Erica became the youngest person to win Ghana's annual DJ award. In 2019 Roc Nation, Jay-Z's entertainment company, acknowledged her skills and featured her on their social media for Black History Month and in 2020 she was listed among Top 100 child prodigies from all around the world and won Global child Prodigy Awards in the DJ category. In 2021, she co-hosted the 12th season of Talented Kidz. Her dream is to be a gynecologist, so she can enhance the process of childbirth for women in her community. She is managed by the American talent agency Buchwald.

== International performances ==
In September 2018, she opened the Bill and Melinda Gates' Foundation's annual Goalkeepers event in New York City, as the warm up act to French President Emmanuel Macron. In May 2019, she was in New York to perform at the NGO ''Room to Read''s gala with Wyclef Jean also on the bill. In June 2019, she performed at the World Bank Africa Society Symposium at the World Bank office in Washington. She performed at the 32nd Ordinary Session of the AU Assembly of Heads of State and Government in February 2019. In June 2019, she made an appearance at the Women Deliver Conference 2019 in Vancouver.

== Ambassadorial deals ==
On July 29, 2019, she became the brand ambassador for BrainWise, a product of the pharmaceutical firm Zutron.

== Songs ==
In November 2019, she released a song by the title "Success".

== Awards and acknowledgement ==
- Winner of Talented Kids in 2017.
- Winner of Best Discovery DJ of the year 2018 Ghana DJ Awards.
- Winner, DJ of the Year at the 2019 Ghana DJ Awards.
- Winner, Best Female DJ of the year 2019 Ghana DJ Awards.
- Global Child Prodigy Awards 2020.
- 49 on InStyle Magazine's list of 50 most influential women who are change makers with global impact (2020).
- Part of a list of 74 Exemplary Ghanaians acknowledged in "Those Who Inspire Ghana" book(2020).
- Young DJ Of The Year 2020.
- Best Young Entertainer of the Year in the 2021 edition of the International Reggae and World Music Awards (IRAWMA).

== Philanthropy ==
After DJ Switch won the TV3 Talent Kidz 2017, she was interviewed by many media houses and she kept repeating she would like to use some of the monies she gets from playing at events and her DJ Switch Foundation to support the less privileged in society. In October 2019, she made a donation of 50 desks, 4 sets of tables and chairs to the students and teachers of A.M.E Zion Junior High School at Brafoyaw in Cape Coast, Ghana. The donations were received by the DCE Hon. Aba Hagan of Abora Asebu Kwanman Kese on behalf of the school.

== See also ==
Official website.
