= Sakyi =

Sakyi is a surname. Notable people with the surname include:

- Moses Sakyi (born 1981), Ghanaian footballer
- Kwaku Sakyi-Addo, Ghanaian journalist
