= Krobo Girls Senior High School =

Krobo Girls' Presbyterian Senior High School
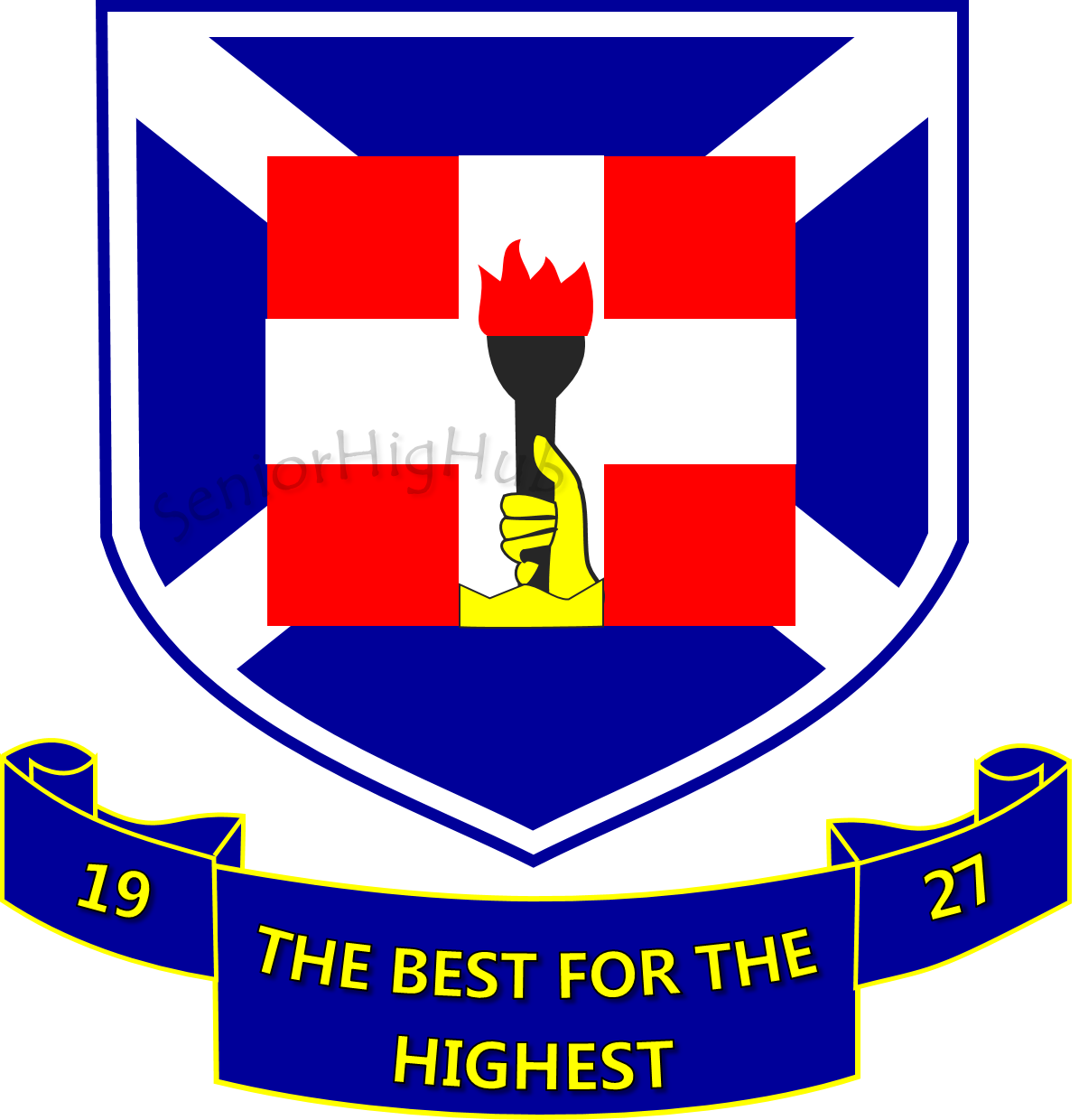

Location
- P. O. Box 47 Odumasi Krobo; Eastern Region; Somanya; Ghana

Information
- Other name: KROGISS
- Type: Public high school
- Motto: The Best For The Highest
- Religious affiliation: Christianity
- Denomination: Presbyterian
- Established: 1927; 99 years ago
- Founder: Scottish missionaries
- Oversight: Ministry of Education
- Headmistress: Bernice Noel Mensah-Akutteh
- Staff: 80 teachers
- Gender: Girls
- Age: 14 to 18
- Enrollment: 2,000
- Average class size: 50
- Language: English
- Campus type: Residential
- Houses: Cairns House Agnes Akoto House Lamont House Dencal House Neuk House St.David’s House
- Colours: Blue and white
- Slogan: "Krobo Is Shining"
- Affiliation: Presbyterian Boys' Senior High School; Pope John Senior High School and Minor Seminary
- Alumni: Portia Gabor Akumaa Mama Zimbi
- Website: www.krobogirls.com

Krobo Girls' Presbyterian Senior High School, popularly known as KROGISS, is an all -female second cycle institution in Odumasi Krobo in the Eastern Region of Ghana.

== History ==
The school was founded in March 1927 by Scottish missionaries, as a middle school for girls. A two-year teacher training college for women was added to the girls' school in 1944 on an experimental basis under the accelerated plan of the government.

The college was constituted a Certificate B Teacher Training College for women in 1951 under the management of the Presbyterian Church of Ghana.

In 1962, the two-year teacher training college was changed to a four-year Certificate A Teacher Training College for women. In September 1973, the Krobo Girls Middle School was phased out while the training college was converted to a girls' secondary school, under the consolidation of the Teacher Education Programme by the Ministry of Education.

== National Science and Maths Quiz ==
On October 22, 2025, Krobo Girls defeated St. Francis Xavier Junior Seminary and Business SHS, to qualify for a place in the one-eighth stage of the competition.

In 2018, the school reached its first-ever semi-final stage at the National Science and Maths Quiz, led by contestants Jemima Opokua Obeng and Harriet Fiagbor. Jemima was later adjudged the Best Female Contestant of the 2018 competition.

== Notable alumni ==
- Portia Gabor, journalist, news anchor at TV3 Ghana
- Docia Kisseih

{nurse, midwife and educator}

- Akumaa Mama Zimbi, television and radio broadcast journalist at Multimedia Group Limited
- Nana Akua Mensah-Abrorampah

{PR Specialist. Award Winning Broadcast Journalist TV3}

- Tracy Asante Osei

{Fashion Designer;Wife of Ken Asante Osei the son of Ghanaian businessman Osei Kwame Despite

- Leah Brown-Wagadu

{Beauty Queen;Winner of Miss Malaika Ghana 2016}
