= Jennifer Anne Myers Ahmed =

Ghanaian judge

Jennifer Anne Myers Ahmed is a Ghanaian judge. In 2025, John Mahama sworn her in as a Justice of the Court of Appeal along with 20 others.

== Biography ==
In 2008, she presided over the case of Ibrahim Zubairu, an NDC parliamentary candidate who was dragged to court on human trafficking charges.

In 2013, she issued a bench warrant in an Accra Circuit Court for the arrest of Hamamat Montia which was later rescinded.

In 2015, she was the judge involving the case of the Let My Vote Count Alliance and the Ghana Police. She also presided over the case involving Papa Poku Sarpong, a businessman who defrauded a radio morning show host.

In 2016, she was sworn in as a Judge to the High Court by Georgina Theodora Wood along with 13 others.

In 2023, she was designated by Gertrude Torkornoo to Land Court 3 within the Law Court Complex in Accra to operate during the legal vacation.

In 2025, she presided over a case involving the Paramount Chief of Yilo Krobo Traditional Area known as Nene Oklepeme Nuer Anorbah Sasraku.
