= Docia Kisseih =

Ghanaian nurse, midwife and educator

Docia Kisseih

Docia Angelina Naki Kisseih (1919–2008) was a Ghanaian nurse, midwife and educator. She was the first Ghanaian to be the country's Chief Nursing Officer after British colonial rule ended. She was influential in pioneering developments in nursing and nursing education, and in her fifties she began university lecturing while studying to become the first nurse in Ghana with a doctoral degree. She also took on leadership roles in a number of professional organisations.

== Early life and education ==
Born on 13 August 1919 at Krobo Odumase, Manya Krobo, her early education was at local Presbyterian schools that had been established by European missionaries: first an infant school and then Krobo Girls Middle School. In her teens she sometimes accompanied her grandmother, a midwife, when she went to deliver a baby. She spent three years at Achimota School where she obtained her Cambridge Higher School Certificate in 1938, and in 1940 she enrolled at the Korle Bu maternity hospital for three years of nursing training with an emphasis on midwifery. There had been cultural barriers that discouraged young women in Ghana from becoming nurses, while being a midwife was more easily acceptable. The first State Registered Nurses’ Training College was opened in Ghana in 1945.

== Career ==
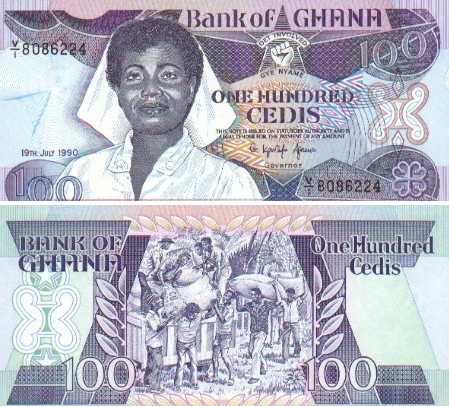
Docia Kisseih on old 100 cedis note

In 1943 Kisseih embarked on more than thirty years of professional nursing and further training. Since nursing education in Ghana was not yet fully developed, in order to be eligible for senior posts under colonial rule she had to spend some time in the 1950s training for further qualifications in England. In 1961 she was made Chief Nursing Officer of the newly independent Ghana: her job title inherited from the earlier British system. Kisseih wanted to work towards having some university graduates within the nursing profession. As a first step a two-year "post-basic" diploma program to train nursing educators and administrators was established in 1963 through a threeway agreement between the World Health Organization (WHO), UNICEF and the Ghanaian government. It attracted nurses from other English-speaking countries in the region as well as from within Ghana. At the same time she oversaw a move away from the traditional British hospital-based system to a more community-based kind of healthcare better suited to Ghanaian society. She developed a new curriculum for nurses, sponsored by the WHO, which emphasised public health and community nursing care with good support for maternal and child health. Kisseih also established a scholarship fund for some nurses to train abroad until a more in-depth education was available locally.

Between 1975 and 1981 she was a lecturer in the Department of Nursing of the University of Ghana while also preparing for her 1980 doctorate at Boston University in the US, which made her the first nurse in Ghana with a post-graduate degree. 1980 saw the beginning of the first four-year bachelor's degree in nursing at the university's Legon campus. She "transformed and modernised nursing education" with "strong imaginative leadership and initiative", according to the citation accompanying an honorary Doctor of Laws degree conferred on her 89th birthday. It went on to say she had been determined that standards should be high after the post-independence departure of qualified nurses from overseas.

Kisseih was the founder and first president of the Ghana Registered Nurses Association (GRNA) formed in 1960 by a merger of two other nursing bodies, one led by her. She also served on the National Health Planning Committee and the Nurses and Midwives Board. She was an African representative to, and a worldwide committee member of, the International Council of Nurses and was their vice-president from 1973 to 1977. She was also involved in voluntary organisations like the Ghana Red Cross Society, the Girl Guides, the St. John Ambulance Association, the St John's Council of Ghana and the Manya Krobo Youth Congress. She was honoured by the state in 1984 and in 1986 her portrait was put on the 100 cedi banknote.

Her honorary degree was conferred ceremonially at Docia Kisseih's home because of her frailty and she died later that month, in August 2008. In 2015 the GRNA instituted a series of lectures to be called the Dr Docia Kisseih Memorial Lectures.
