= Portia Gabor =

Ghanaian journalist

Portia Solomon Gabor
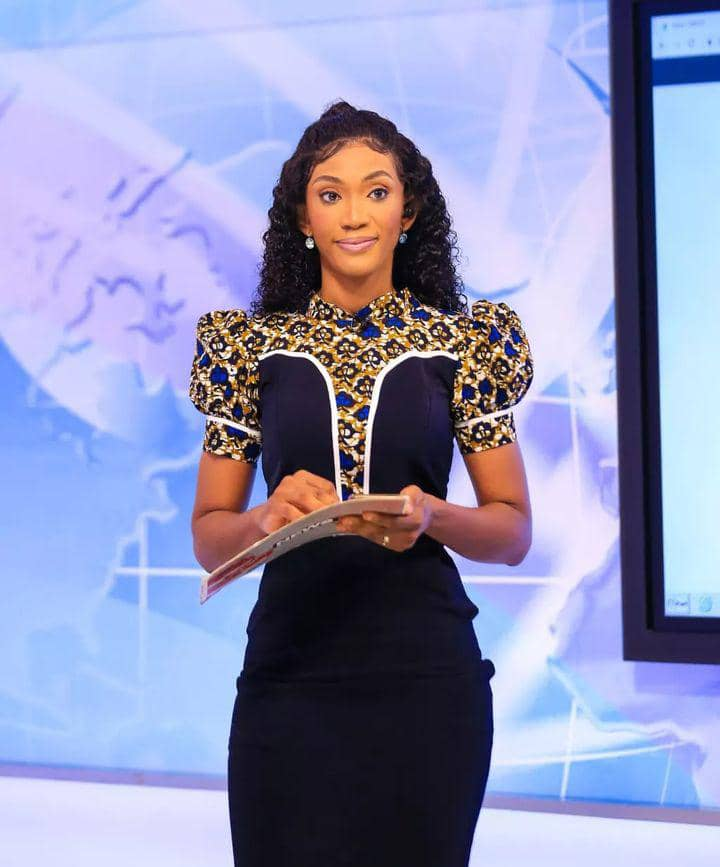
- Occupations: News anchor, voice actor, media personality
- Years active: 2002–present
- Employer: Media General
- Organization: TV3 Ghana

Portia Solomon Gabor (née Portia Solomon; born April 27) is a Ghanaian broadcast journalist, news anchor, producer, voice actor and media personality who currently works with TV3.

She was adjudged the Journalist of the Year at the 26th GJA Awards organized by the Ghana Journalists Association (GJA).She is well-known for her investigative reporting and health journalism. With her story “Beggar’s Paradise” and “Wealth for Health,” Portia Gabor won Best in Television News Reporting and Best in Health Reporting, respectively, and was awarded Journalist of the Year.

== Early life and education ==
She was born to Mrs. Audrey Arde-Acquah and Mr. Seth Solomon. She grew up in Accra, Ghana. Portia Gabor had her nursery education at Aglow Children's Centre in Madina and later the University of Ghana Basic School Legon.

She attended Krobo Girls Senior High School and continued to study psychology at the University of Ghana but began with a Diploma in Communication from African University College of Communications (AUCC).she did her service at the Information Services Department

She has a Masters in Development Communication from the Ghana Institute of Journalism.

== Career ==
Portia joined TV3 Ghana, a division of Media General,in September 2002 after completing her university education. She began her career as a reporter and later became a news anchor, producer, and editor for feature programmes and documentaries

Throughout her career, Gabor has specialized in investigative journalism and health reporting, contributing to coverage of public health, environmental issues, and social development in Ghana.

To raise awareness of issues impacting Ghanaians, she has made several trips to various villages around the nation.She has interviewed a wide range of people, including the Queen of Denmark and the average Ghanaian. Portia took part in the US Department of State's 2018 International Visitor Leadership Programme

At the Kanda-based television station, Portia is the editor for features as together with documentaries.

== Awards and recognition ==
Year	Awarding Body	Award/Category	Result
2010	Ghana Journalists Association	Best Television News Reporting {Beggar's Paradise}	Won
2010	Ghana Journalists Association	Best Health Reporting ( Wealth for Health)	Won
2010	Ghana Journalists Association	Best Report on Development Journalism for Furthering the MDGs.	Won
2011	CNN Multichoice Africa Journalist Awards	Drug Trafficking in Rural Africa(Highly Commended ).	Highly Commended
2017	Ghana Journalists Association	Best Television News Reporter	Won
2018	Ghana Journalists Association	Best Environment Reporter	Won
2019	Merck More Than a Mother Awards	Report on Infertility	Won
2019	Ghana Journalists Association	Female Journalist of the Year	Won
2019	Ghana Journalists Association	Best Road safety and Transport Reporter	Won
2020	Ghana Journalists Association	Best Science Reporting.	Won
2020	Ghana Journalists Association	Special Award for COVID-19 reporting	Won
2022	Ghana Journalists Association	Journalist of the Year	Won
2022	MTN Heroes of change	Media Hero Recognition	Honoured
