= Sika Osei =

Ghanaian actress

Sassy Sika Osei
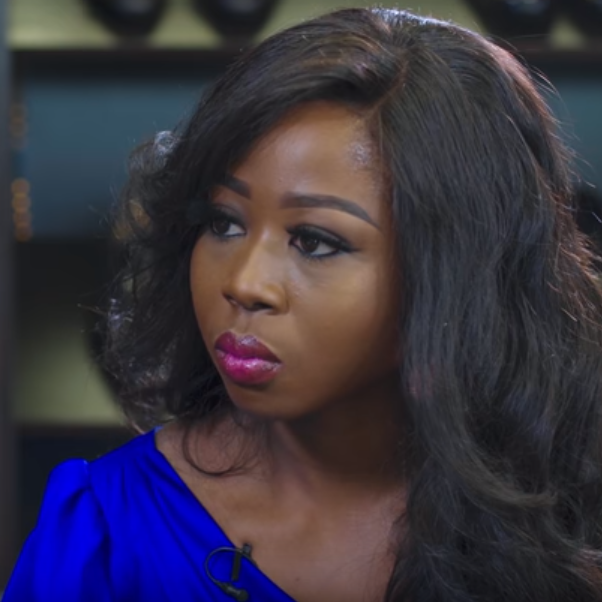
- Sika Osei in April 2019 on Fashion Insider
- Born: 1985 (age 40–41); Ghana
- Education: University of Ghana
- Occupations: Actress, producer, model
- Known for: DStv's Studio 53 extra, NadiTV's Fashion Insider
- Notable work: Guilty, 3N
- Spouse: Sele Douglas
- Awards: Golden Movie Awards

Sassy Sika Osei (born 1985) is a Ghanaian actress, producer and TV personality who has worked as a brand influencer for popular brands including L’Oreal Paris and Woodin. She is currently the co-host of popular TV shows and red carpet events which includes The Ladies Circle on TV3, DStv's Studio 53 extra, NdaniTV's Fashion Insider, 2019 VGMA red carpet experience, Channel O News Live in Accra and Glitz Africa Fashion Week for Star Gist on DStv.

== Education ==
Osei was born in Ghana but due to her mother's occupation, a diplomat of the United Nations, she had to live in various countries including South Africa, US and India. On returning to Ghana, she schooled at SOS and earned a bachelor's degree in art from the University of Ghana. She proceeded to Ghana Institute of Management and Public Administration (GIMPA) where she studied law.

== Career ==
Osei's work revolves around acting, producing movies and hosting shows and events. She was the first female presenter of Phamous TV, a popular lifestyle and entertainment show. As of 2017, she was the face of Habiba Shea Butter after she was name brand ambassador for Ghandour Cosmetics Limited, a Cosmetic Giant. In 2016, she co-hosted the African Fashion and Design Week in Nigeria. In 2019, she co-hosted the VGMA red carpet experience, with Giovani Caleb. Currently, she co-hosts popular TV shows including DStv's Studio 53 extra and Fashion Insider by NdaniTV.

== Personal life ==
On 22 October 2021, Osei married Sele Douglas in Accra, Ghana. She gave birth in 2024

== Filmography ==
- Grey Dawn (2015) as Flora Davies
- The Counselor (2015)
- 3 Nights Ago (2016) as Ewurama
- In Line (2017) as Bella
- Hustle
- Public Property (2017)
- Bad Luck Joe (2018) as Zuri Turkson
- Sidechic Gang (2018) as Fella
- Joseph (2020) as Abena
- Little Problems (2021) as Pokua
- Single Not Searching (2022) as Kisi
- Nine (2023) as Lauren
- Sink or Swim; the perilous journey (2017)

As producer

- Guilty (2015)
- 3NA (2016)

== Awards ==
- 2018 Golden Movie Awards – In Line won the Best Comedy award
- 2019 Golden Movie Awards – Bad Luck Joe nominated Best Comedy award
- Africa Movie Academy Awards 2018 – Sidechic Gang nominated for Best Actress in a Leading Role
- Lagos 30 Under 40 Award – nominated
