= Sheroes of Our Time =

Ghanaian women's interest weekly talk show

- Genre: Women's interest Talk
- Created by: Anita Erskine
- Presented by: Anita Erskine
- Country of origin: Ghana
- Original language: English
- No. of episodes: 50

Production
- Executive producer: Owusua DaCosta
- Producer: Gifty Appiah
- Production locations: Ghana, Nigeria, Canada, United States, United Kingdom, People's Republic of China
- Running time: 30 minutes

Original release
- Network: Akwaaba Magic on DSTV
- Release: September 3, 2018

Sheroes of Our Time is a Ghanaian women's interest weekly talk show hosted by Anita Erskine on DSTV in English language. Broadcast on Akwaaba Magic channel 150, the show airs every Thursday at 6:00 PM (West Africa Time) and lasts 30 minutes.

== Program history ==
The pre-recorded 30-minute educative talk show focus on discussions on positive socio-economic advancement issues in Ghana and the African continent at large. Through the introduction of new Ghanaian only content channel on DSTV, as of March 2021 the show began airing on Akwaaba Magic channel 150. The first season of the show began airing on September 3, 2018, on DSTV channel Fox Life Africa 126, first episode was released on September 3, 2018, and guest was former Ghanaian politician and minister Joyce Aryee.

=== Host ===
- Anita Erskine (2018–present)

== List of guests ==
- Joyce Aryee
- Eugenia Tachie-Menson
- Mrs Omotade Alalade
- Fatimatu Abubakar
- Philomena Esinam Afi Antonio Addo
- Stacy Mawuenam Ameyowi
- Chineyenwa Okoro Onu
- Muhammida El Muhajir
- Dr. Neh Onumah
- Mavis Bermudez
- Victoria Naashika Quaye
- Comfort Lamptey
- Priscilla Ikos Usiobaifo
- Nachula Wilson
- Lina Wolley
- Valeria Worlagbor
- Eugenia Bankoh
- AlbertNana Akyaa Akosa
- Margarete Afriye
- Lana Captan
- Mabel Suglo
- Amma Gyampo
- Bukky Williams
- Abiodun Essiet
- Efua Adabie
