= Kwami Sefa Kayi =

Ghanaian media personally

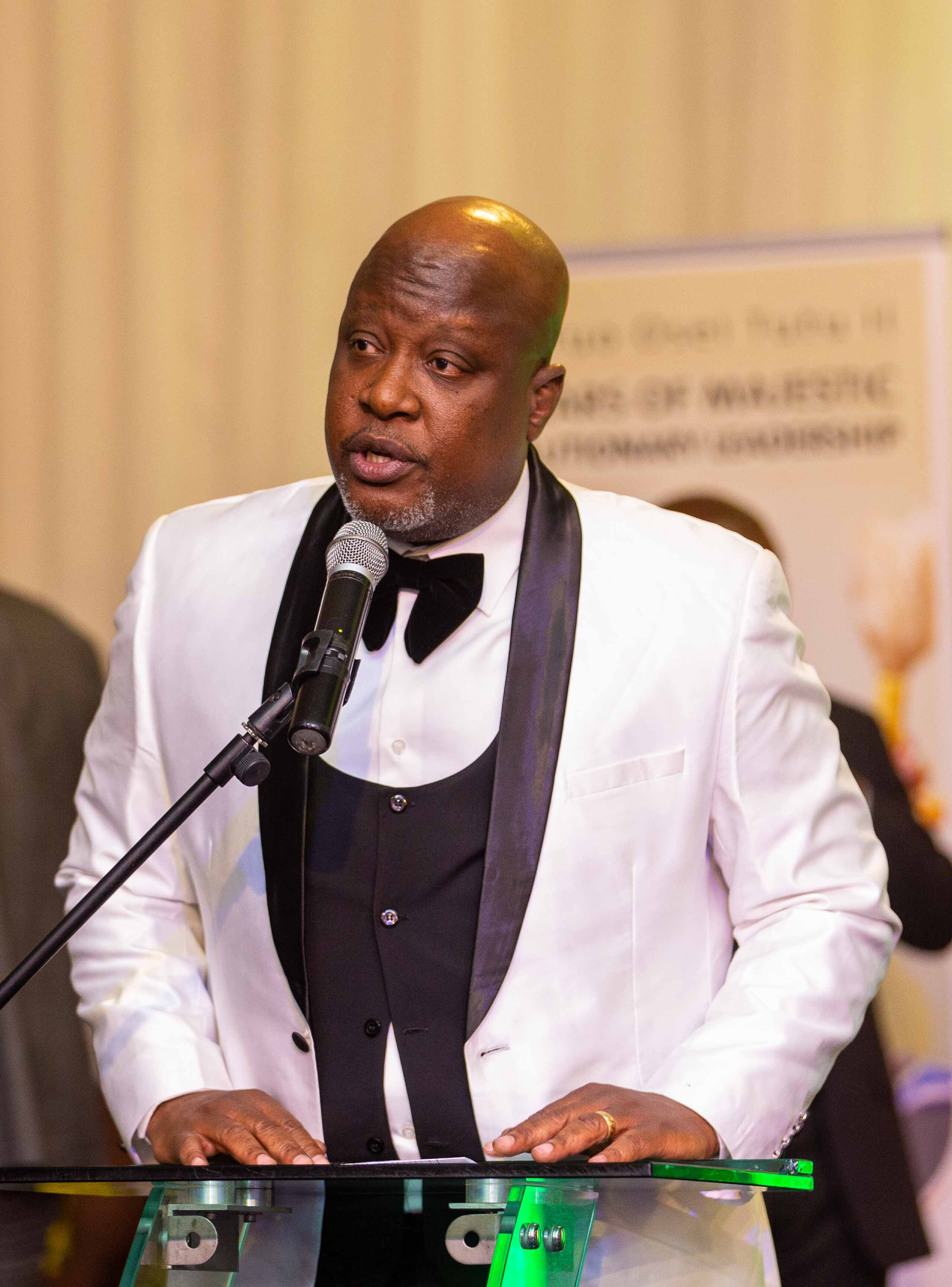
- Born: June 20, 1970 (age 56)
- Other name: Chairman General
- Citizenship: Ghanaian
- Education: Okuapeman Secondary School; Kofi Annan International Peacekeeping Training Centre
- Occupation: Broadcaster
- Employer: Despite Media Group
- Organization: Peace FM (Ghana)
- Spouse: Barbara Ewuradwoa Kayi
- Children: A son and 4 daughters

Kwami Sefa Kayi (born 20 June 1970) also known as Chairman General is a Ghanaian media personality, broadcast journalist and public speaker. He is currently the host of Peace FM's morning show popularly known as “Kokrokoo”.

== Personal life and education ==
Kayi completed his secondary school education at the Okuapeman Secondary School in Akropong Akuapem. Sefa Kayi gained an Executive Master of Arts in Conflict, Peace and Security (EMCPS) programme from the Kofi Annan International Peacekeeping Training Centre (KAIPTC) in 2018.

== Career ==
Kayi is a broadcast journalist, public speaker and a Master of Ceremony. He is currently the host of Peace FM's morning show popularly known as “Kokrokoo. Kwami Sefa Kayi on August 6, 2021, was sworn in as a board member of the National Petroleum Authority.

== Entertainment ==
He hosted the maiden edition of Ghana Music Awards until 2007. In 2019 he co-hosted the 20th VGMA with Berla Mundi.

Here are some awards his show has won:

== Awards and recognition ==
Radio and Television Personalities Awards RTP Personality Of The Decade 2010–2020.

== Philanthropy ==
He is the owner of Kokrokoo Foundation which was established in 2015. In April 2019, the foundation donated incubators worth $100,000.00 to help curb the mortality rate of children born pre-term.

Year	Nominee / work	Award	Result
2013	Radio Morning Show Host of the Year	Radio and TV Personality Awards	Won
2014	Radio Morning Show Host of the Year	Radio and TV Personality Awards	Won
2015	Radio Morning Show Host of the Year	Radio and TV Personality Awards	Won

The 'Project 100' drive was conceived in 2014 and had the aim to provide at least 100 incubators to a number of health institutions in the country. As of April 2021, 35 incubators had been provided.
