= Asaase Radio =

Radio station in Accra, Ghana

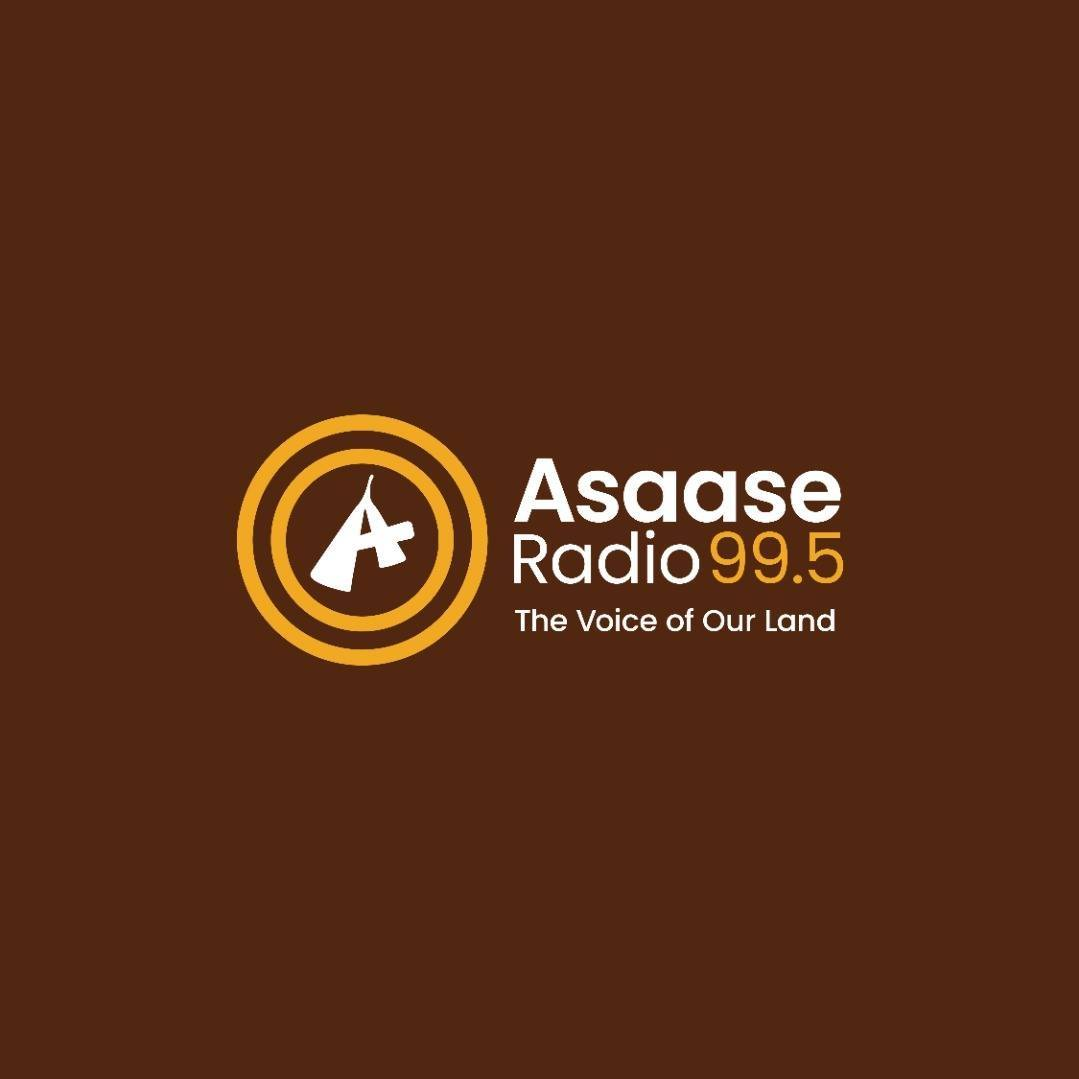
- Accra; Ghana
- Broadcast area: Greater Accra Region and beyond
- Frequencies: 99.5 MHz, 98.5, 99.7, 100.3, 107.3

Programming
- Languages: English, Twi/Fante
- Format: Local news, African news, talk, sports, lifestyle, politics and entertainment

Ownership
- Sister stations: Asaase 98.5 Kumasi (98.5 MHz), Asaase 99.7 Tamale (99.7 MHz), Asaase 100.3 Cape Coast (100.3MHz), Stone City Radio (Ho, 90.70 MHz), AsaasePa (Accra, 107.3MHz)

History
- First air date: 14 June 2020

Links
- Website: Asaaseradio.com

Asaase Radio is a privately owned radio station with headquarters in Accra, the capital of Ghana, broadcasting in English on 99.5 MHz from Cantonments. It has sister stations in Kumasi (98.5 MHz), Tamale (99.7 MHz) and Cape Coast (100.3 MHz) as well as an Akan-language affiliate, AsaasePa (107.3 MHz), also broadcasting from Accra. Asaase 99.5 began official transmission on 14 June 2020.

Among the shareholders and board members of Asaase Broadcasting Company are Gabby Asare Otchere-Darko (chairman; senior partner, Africa Legal Associates), the senior journalist Elizabeth Akua Ohene, Kojo Opoku Agyeman (professor of literature at University of Cape Coast), Nkiru Balonwu, the respected journalist Kojo Mensah, Joseph Ofori-Atta and Ebow Brew-Hammond (Africa Legal Associates).

The station operates under the tagline “The Voice of Our Land”.

== Programmes and events ==
The Asaase Breakfast Show with Ekow Essilfie

Sunday Night (the station’s launch programme with Kwaku Sakyi-Addo in 2020)

Asaase Café with Naa Dzama in Accra, Naa Klordey in Kumasi, YAD in Tamale and Egyirba in Cape Coast

Rush Hour with Elvis Crystal

TownHall Talk with Kojo Mensah

The Forum with Wilberforce Asare (previously hosted by Kwaku Agyeman-Budu)

Yaad Settingz with King Lagazee

Asaase Sound Clash

== Notable presenters ==
- DJ Ace
- Caroline Sampson (2020-25)
- Kennedy Mornah (2020-22)
- Kojo Mensah
- Kwaku Sakyi-Addo
- Tommy Annan Forson (2022-24)
- Obomengniibaa Nana Akua (AsaasePa 107.3)
- Bonohene of Atumpan (AsaasePa 107.3)
- Professor Kofi Abotsi (2020-24)
- Elvis Crystal
- Naa Ashorkor Mensah-Doku (2020-23)
- Kwaku Nhyira Addo (2021-25)

== Asaase Sound Clash ==
Asaase Radio organised its maiden Asaase Sound Clash on Saturday 12 September 2020, between the two great dancehall rivals, '''Shatta Wale''' and '''Stonebwoy'''.

== Shutdown by the NCA ==
On 12 June 2025, the National Communications Authority (NCA) shut down Asaase Radio and over 60 other radio stations, citing various regulatory breaches. The station resumed broadcast the same day after intervention by President John Mahama.
