= Poisoned Bait =

Ghanaian drama series

Poisoned Bait is a Ghanaian drama television series which debuted on IROKOtv on February 14, 2015, and Africa Magic in 2015. The 30 minute series is directed by Leila Djansi and produced by Turning Point Media and licensed to IROKOtv. It stars Gideon Okeke, Marie Humber, Mary Remmy Njoku, Adjetey Anang, John Dumelo, Ama K. Abebrese and Edward Agyekum Kufuor.

The show centers around Ariel, a struggling literary manager, her best friend, Betty and Ariel's first love, Bernard, her ex who arrives into Ghana from Egypt on the day of her wedding sending her once peaceful life out of control.

== Main cast ==
- Marie Humber as Ariel Morrisson, a literary manager, whose life begins to take twists and turns when her first love, Bernand shows up on her wedding day as she is about to wed her decent boyfriend. Ariel's husband is Brother Henry, but, Bernand intends on tearing them apart.
- Mary Remmy Njoku as Betty, Ariel's best friend and only client whose book on marriage creates a juxtaposition between her own marriage.
- Gideon Okeke as Bernand, Ariel's first love who returns to Ghana on the day of her wedding after 12 years and the CEO of ARITEX LTD. Upon his return from Egypt, he is determined to win Ariel back.
- Adjetey Anang as Henry, Husband to Ariel. Henry is threatened by the return of Bernand.

== Recurring cast ==
- Ama K. Abebrese
- Naa Ashorkor Mensah Doku
- Maame Dokuno, Bex
- Edward Kuffour
- David Dontoh
- Luckie Lawson
