= Akumaa Mama Zimbi =

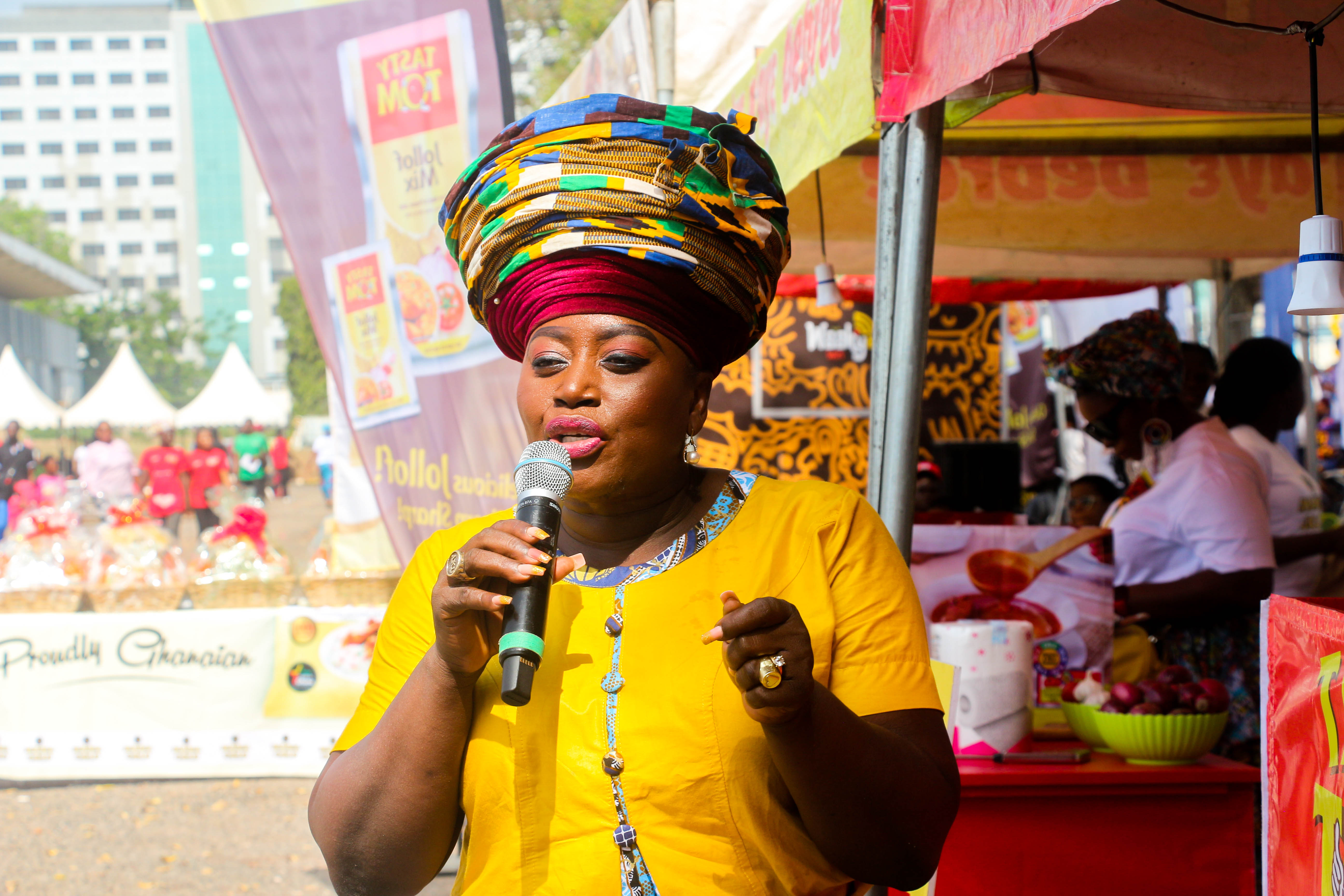
- Born: Ghana
- Website: www.mamazimbi.org

Akumaa Mama Zimbi, also known professionally as Dr. Joyce Akumaa Dongotey-Padi, is a Ghanaian television and radio broadcast journalist, women's rights activist, blogger, marriage counselor, and actress in Ghana. Akumaa is known for her fascinating, yet sexually stimulating, ways of expressing "Medaase" (Thank you). Her exceptional way of wearing her headgear also comes off as a distinct Akumaa brand.

== Early life and education ==
Akumaa was born on 25 November. She attended Krobo Girls Senior High School. She further went to Ghallywood Academy of Film Acting. She also went to the Ghana Institute of Journalism.

Little is known about Akumaa's early life as well as her family and educational background. However, it is known that her father is a policeman and her husband is a businessman to whom she has been married for over twenty-four years.

== Professional life ==
Akumaa emerged as a celebrated actress in the early 1990s when she featured in the popular Cantata Show as a "house girl." This show was hosted by the Ghana Television Station. Her interest in broadcast journalism, precisely in radio, began in the early 2000s. In her interview with Deloris Frimpong Manso, Akumaa stated that Rosemary, a very good friend of hers, encouraged her to visit Joy FM, the Tema branch, in the year 2000 to discuss her interest in working with this popular Ghanaian radio station as a radio presenter. Although Akumaa possessed very little to zero background in broadcast journalism, her popularity as an actress together with her acumen as an eloquent speaker allowed Joy FM to offer her an opportunity to learn on the job. Looking up to radio and TV personalities such as Father Bosco, Akumaa applied her personal principles of hard work, discipline, and humility at her workplace and over a period of about eighteen years, rose through the ranks. Presently, she is a host for the Odo Ahomaso Show, which offers critical advise on relationship and marital issues on Adom TV in Ghana.

If the name "Akumaa" or "Mama Zimbi" resonates as a household name in Ghana, the reasons can best be attributed to Dr. Dongotey-Padi's early contributions to the Cantata Show and her continuous interventions in people's relationship matters. For her position as a mentor, marriage counselor, and an expert on relationship/marriage issues, Akumaa identifies as #IAmTheSexDoctor, #IAmTheBestEver, and a "Relationship Doctor."

== Personal life ==
Akumaa is a Christian. She is married with 6 children.

== Philanthropy ==
Beyond her work as a television and radio host, Akumaa runs a foundation, Mama Zimbi's Foundation, founded in 2004 that is committed to caring for and empowering underprivileged women, especially widows, and children in Ghana and reviving marriages. Through this foundation, Akumaa is able to reach out to widows and their needy children while educating adolescents and the youth on their sexual and reproductive health. In 2007 Mama Zimbi's Foundation launched the Widows Alliance Network (WANE) integrates economic, social, sustainable and cultural transformation tools into an educational package to alleviate the untold hardships widows experience in Ghana.

== Awards and recognition ==
Radio and Television Personalities Awards Radio Development Show Host Of The Year 2019–2020. She received two National Awards

== Filmography ==
- Cantata
