= Ghana Chamber of Telecommunications =

The Ghana Chamber of Telecommunications is an umbrella organization that regulates and promotes the interests of telecommunication companies in Ghana. The Chamber is an advocacy body established to shape telecommunications policy, legislation, and regulation, while promoting research to advance the sector. It was registered in 2010 and formally inaugurated in 2011.

Kwaku Sakyi-Addo was the Chief executive officer for the first six years of its existence. He resigned in April 2017. Ing. Kenneth Ashigbey took over the reins and resigned in May, 2025.

== Past and current chief executive officers ==
Name of the CEO	Date
Sylvia Owusu-Ankomah	2025-date
Ing. Kenneth Ashigbey	2017-2025
Kwaku Sakyi-Addo	2011-2017
