= Kwaku Sakyi-Addo =

Ghanaian journalist

Kwaku Addo Sakyi-Addo is a journalist from Ghana, who was the country correspondent for both Reuters and the BBC between 1993 and 2007. He currently hosts a political talk show on Asaase Radio in Accra.

== Education ==
Kwaku Sakyi Addo received his elementary education at Aburi Presbyterian Boys' Boarding School and his secondary education at Achimota School. He proceeded to the University of Ghana's School of Communications. He was sponsored by the Thompson Foundation to study at the University of Wales in Cardiff. He has also taken courses at the International Institute of Journalism in Berlin and was a one-time Chevening Scholar. He is currently a Permanent Fellow of the World Press Institute at Macalester College in St. Paul, Minnesota, United States.

== Career ==
Sakyi Addo's journalism career began in 1984. He was the editor-in-chief of the Ghanaian Chronicle between 1993 and 1994. He was also a BBC World Service correspondent between 1994 and 2007.

He was well known for presenting Ghana's long-running radio series, The Front Page. The programme started on 6 July 1995 and the last episode was on 30 April 2010. He first met and interviewed Komla Dumor for the BBC during the early stages of Dumor's broadcasting career. They later worked together at Joy FM during the time when Sakyi-Addo presented the Front Page programme.

His work has been published in The Economist, The Washington Post and Newsweek.

International figures who have been interviewed by Sakyi-Addo include Kofi Annan, past Secretary-General Boutros Ghali, Jimmy Carter, former Prime Minister of Israel Yitzhak Shamir, former British Cabinet Minister Lord Carrington, Bono, and Larry King of Larry King Live.

Between 2016 and 2018, Sakyi-Addo hosted The Lounge, which was a live radio and television talk show on Starr FM and GHOne TV. He was also the executive producer and host of Kwaku One-on-One on GTV and TV3 Ghana for ten years.

In 2011, he became the founder and Chief executive officer of the Ghana Chamber of Telecommunications, a position he held until he was appointed chairman of the board of the National Communications Authority.

In June 2020, Sakyi-Addo was back on radio with the a new talk show called Sunday Night on a new FM radio station in Accra called Asaase Radio. He interviewed Jerry Rawlings, former President of Ghana, who disclosed a lot about events surrounding the 15 May 1979 uprising and the 4 June 1979 coup d'état.

He is a Fellow of the African Leadership Initiative, a forum for continental leaders to define the next threshold for visionary leadership in Africa affiliated with the Aspen Institute.

== Awards ==
In 2008, he was inducted into the Order of the Volta, Member Division, the Republic of Ghana's second highest state honour. He has won Ghana's Journalist of the Year Award twice.
