= Miss Malaika Ghana =

Ghanaian pageant show

- Genre: Reality; Beauty Pageant
- Country of origin: Ghana
- Original language: English
- No. of seasons: 13

Production
- Producer: Charter House Productions

Original release
- Network: TV3 Ghana, GHOne TV
- Release: 2003 – present

Miss Malaika Ghana is a beauty pageant, reality show which first aired in Ghana in 2003. The show is produced by Charter House Productions and airs on Ghana television station TV3 as well as DSTV channel Africa Magic. The pageant is produced as a 12- to 13-week reality show. It was the first beauty pageant show to be aired as a reality series in Ghana.

== Show overview ==
From the conception of the show 2002, it has been presented to the audience as a reality TV show which allows for the viewers to vote for their favorite contestant to be crowned Miss Malaika Ghana. Each week, the contestants are given tasks to perform which range from performances to organizing events. This is then assessed by a panel of judges who have a certain degree of power in selecting successful candidates and eliminating others.

== Judges ==
Before the pageant was produced as a reality television series, with viewers voting for their favourite contestants, Ghana's Miss Malaika's representative was handpicked by judges. Since the show began in 2003, it has included judges known as the godmothers. The duty of the godmothers are to instruct and teach the contestants on conduct and beauty amongst other things. These godmothers are Mrs Kay Bentsi-Enchill who's been on the show for 3 years and Mary-Anne Sekyi, who's has 6 years worth of experience. The 2010 finale judging panel of the event also included, Ghanaian actors John Dumelo and Jackie Appiah, as well as Paul Adom Otchere.

== Requirements for entry ==
The pageant is open to single females between the ages of 18 or those who would turn 18 the present year and 26. Hopeful contestants need to be a sizes 10 and 14 and must be of "Ghanaian" origin. Other requirements are that the ladies are high school graduates, have no breast implants and no height restrictions.

== Controversy ==
During the 2011 pageant, there was controversy as to whether the winner Geraldine Partington deserved the crown. A lot of Media houses accused the judges of rigging the scores in favor of Geraldine. This was because, during the final questions, there was a tie in the scores and so the remaining two finalists[Geraldine and Alexandra] had to answer a final question. During the answering of the questions, Alex answered hers better than Geraldine but Gerry was given the crown because she was more pretty than Alex. This made the show receive a lot of backlash from fans who were disappointed that the show wasn't staying true to their values. It nearly made the show lose its credibility as one of the most prestigious Beauty Pageants in Ghana. Because of the controversies that surrounded the 2011 Pageant, the following year saw an esteemed Panel of Judges including renowned radio Personality Kwame Sefa Kayi, Deputy Minister of Tourism Dzifa and officials from the Miss Malaika Organization who are also Godmothers, Mrs Kay Bentsi-Enchill and Mary-Anne Sekyi. They were called to judge so there wouldn't be a repeat from last year.

== Winners of the competition ==
Year	Winner
2003	Thelma Tawiah
2004	Melissa Mensah
2005	Patricia Akuamoah
2006	Hamamat Montia
2007	Laurie Naa Lamiley Lawson
2008	Tamara Aku Dzormeku
2009	Gezelle Addae
2010	Ama Nettey
2011	Geraldine Partington
2012	Bridget Sharon Cofie
2013	Naa Oyoe Quartey
2014	Eirene Binabiba
2015	Kuukua Korsah
2016	Leah Brown
2017	Pearl Nyarko
2018	Mariam Owusu-Poku
2019	Phylis Vesta Boison
2020	Jasmine Djang
2021	Ama Tutuwaa
2022	Zakiya Ahmed
2023	Lady Nana Yaa Nyarko
2024	Lucille Naa Kwaley King
2025	Akosua Arhin
