= Frank Andoh =

Ghanaian footballer

Personal information
- Full name: Franklin Andoh
- Date of birth: September 21, 1986 (age 40)
- Place of birth: Maknesim, Ghana
- Height: 6 ft 2 in (1.88 m)
- Position: Goalkeeper

Team information
- Current team: Tudu Mighty Jets
- Number: 30

Senior career*
Years	Team	Apps	(Gls)
2006	Ashanti Gold S.C.		
2007–2010	Kessben F.C.		
2011–	Tudu Mighty Jets		
- * Club domestic league appearances and goals

Franklin "Frank" Andoh (born September 21, 1986, in Mankesim) is a Ghanaian footballer, who currently plays for Tudu Mighty Jets.

== Career ==
Andoh played Ashanti Gold SC. He moved in 2007 to Kessben F.C., After the resolution of Kessben F.C. signed in December 2010 with Tudu Mighty Jets FC.

== International ==
In 2006 Andoh was called up to Ghana U-20 team
