= Hamamat Montia =

Ghanaian model and a former Miss Malaika queen

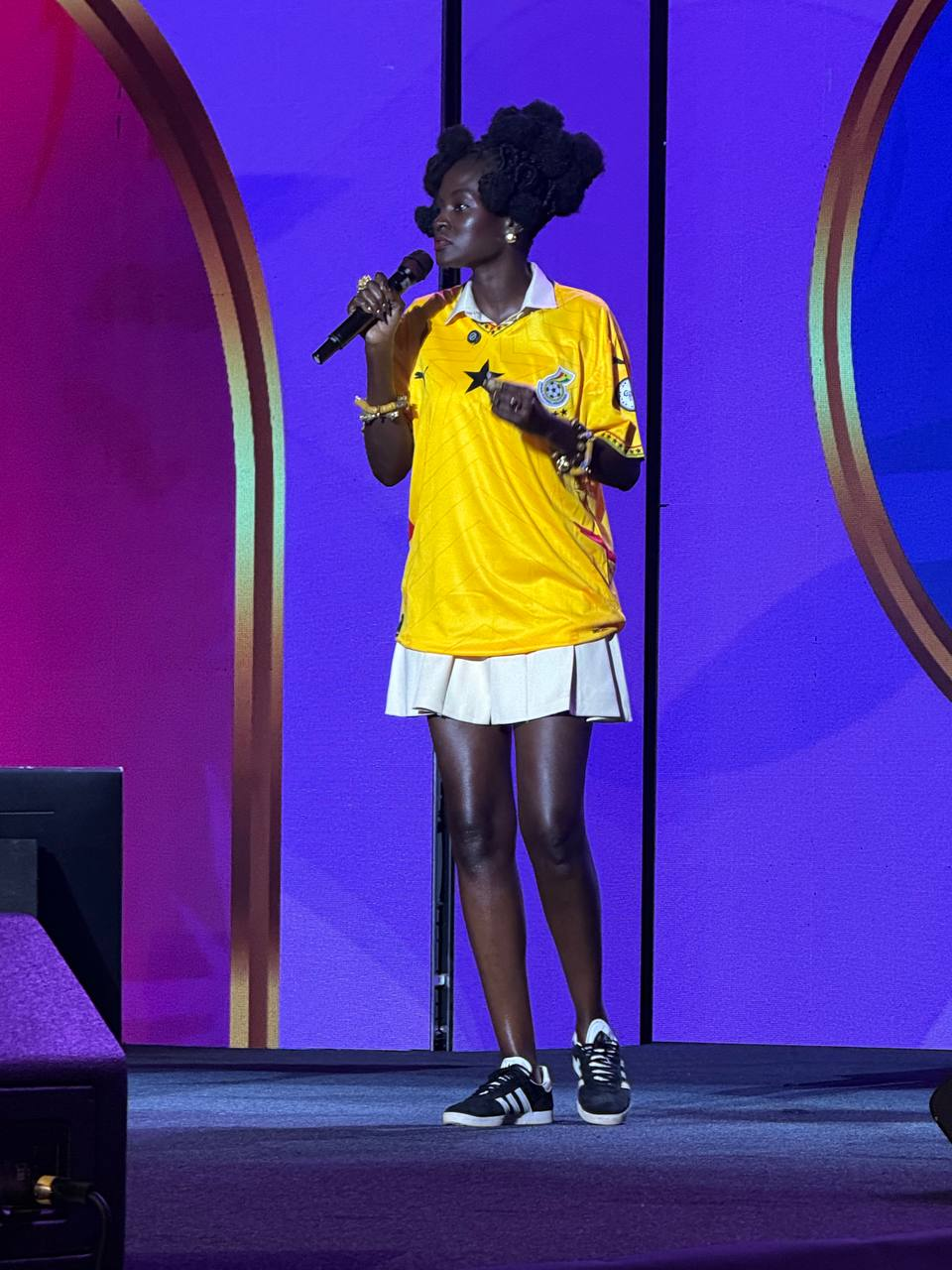
- Hamamat speaking at the 8th National Women's Summit and Expo
- Born: Hamamat Montia; 22. July 1988; Bolgatanga, Ghana
- Education: High School Education at Achimota School, in Ghana
- Occupations: Model, entrepreneur
- Years active: 2006-present

Hamamat Montia (22. July 1988) is a Ghanaian model, entrepreneur and cultural advocate. She is a former Miss Miss Malaika queen and Model of Africa Universe. Beyond modeling, she is known for promoting Ghana’s shea butter industry, founding the Shea Butter Museum, and supporting women-led production in northern Ghana.

== Early life and education ==
Montia was born in Ghana and hails from the Northern Region. She spent part of her early life in rural communities, where she was exposed to traditional practices, including shea butter production. These experiences has influenced her entrepreneurial and advocacy work. She attended Achimota School for her secondary education.

== Career ==
Montia began her career as a model and was crowned Miss Malaika Ghana in 2006 and Model of Africa Universe in 2007. Following her modeling career, she transitioned into entrepreneurship, focusing on the shea butter industry. She later established the Shea Butter Village and the Shea Butter Museum, initiatives that promote locally produced products and traditional methods of production, and serve as educational and tourism platforms.

== Recognition and ambassadorial appointment ==
In February 2026, Montia was appointed as Ghana’s Cultural Ambassador for Shea Butter by the Ministry of Tourism, Culture and Creative Arts. The role recognises her long‑standing advocacy and entrepreneurial work in promoting Ghanaian shea butter as both a cultural heritage product and an economic asset. The appointment is linked to her efforts in supporting women‑led shea‑butter cooperatives and sustainable production practices, as well as her involvement in initiatives such as the Shea Butter Museum, which seeks to preserve and promote Ghana’s shea‑butter tradition. The government framed the position as a way to highlight indigenous knowledge, support local producers, and position Ghana’s shea‑butter sector on international markets.

== Personal life ==
She is a mother of two daughters and one son.
