= Public Property (film) =

2017 Nigerian film

- Directed by: Tope Alake; Ashionye Michelle Raccah
- Starring: Ashionye Michelle Raccah; Femi Jacobs; Kiki Omeili; Okey Uzoeshi; Omowunmi Dada
- Release date: 2017
- Running time: 90 minutes
- Country: Nigeria

Public Property is a 2017 Nigerian film directed by Tope Alake and Ashionye Michelle Raccah.

== Plot ==
A young man plays fast and loose with women before dumping them. He tries it with another woman and gets into trouble because he has never met a lady who would give him a hard time before.

== Cast ==
- Ashionye Michelle Raccah
- Femi Jacobs
- Kiki Omeili
- Okey Uzoeshi
- Omowunmi Dada
- Paul Adams
- Sika Osei
