= Galaxy International School, Accra =

Galaxy International School

Location
- (3 Campuses); Greater Accra Region; Accra; Ghana
- Coordinates: 5.6715°N 0.1289°W

Information
- School type: Preschool, Primary, High School
- Motto: Excellence Reigns
- Established: 2001
- Status: Active
- School district: Accra Metropolis
- Authority: Ministry of Education
- Oversight: Ghana Education Service
- Gender: (Boys/Girls)
- Website: www.galaxy.edu.gh

Galaxy International School is an international school located in Accra, Ghana.

The school has three campuses, a secondary school located in Ashaley Botwe, a primary school and preschool located in East Legon, all in Accra.

== History ==
Galaxy International School was established in 2001 in Accra Ghana to provide day and boarding facilities to children living in Ghana and children of foreigners based and living outside Ghana. The school currently has 450 students from over 47 countries in attendance.
