= Berla Mundi =

Ghanaian media personality

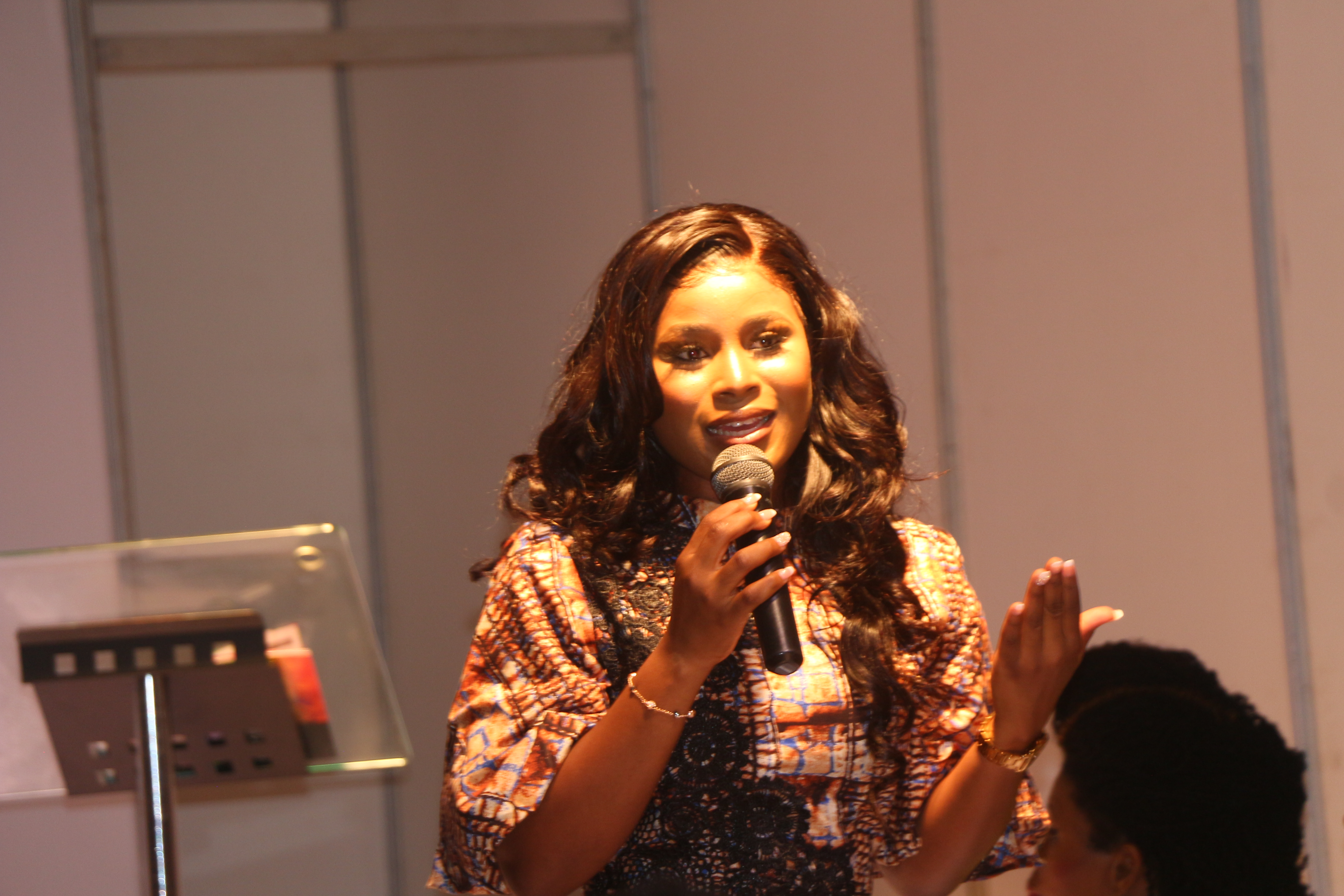
- Mundi in 2020
- Born: Berlinda Addardey; 1 April 1988 (age 38)
- Education: Achimota School; University of Ghana; Ghana Institute of Journalism
- Occupations: Broadcaster, Journalist
- Years active: 2013–present
- Known for: Miss Malaika, VGMA

Berlinda Addardey, popularly known as Berla Mundi, (born 1 April 1988) in the Greater Accra Region of Ghana to the parent Mama Ruby Mundi of Accra. She is a Ghanaian media personality, women's advocate and voice artist. In 2019, she co-hosted the 20th VGMA with Kwami Sefa Kayi. She has co-hosted the VGMA for six consecutive times.

== Education ==
Berla is an alumna of St. Theresa's School, Achimota School and the University of Ghana where she studied linguistics and psychology for her first degree.

She studied French at Alliance Franҫaise. She also studied at the Ghana Institute of Journalism. She also holds a certification from Harvard Business School Executive Education on Developing Yourself as a Leader.

== Career ==
Berla Mundi began her media career after becoming the second runner-up at the 2010 Miss Maliaka beauty pageant. After which she proceeded to co-host the event and later became a judge in the same pageant. She also worked with GHOne TV a subsidiary of the EIB Network for five years. She is currently with TV3 Ghana a subsidiary of Media General Ghana Limited. Berla hosted reality shows and corporate events. She hosted Africa's first syndicated show on DSTV, Moment with MO. She was recognized as the most influential Ghanaian in 2017 by Avance Media. In 2017 she won The Most Stylish Media Personality at the Glitz Style Awards Founded by Claudia Lumor.

Mundi is known for her advocacy for girls and women's rights. She launched a mentoring and career guidance project in 2018, for young women.

She established the Berla Mundi foundation in 2015. In June 2019, Mundi was featured in the Visual Collaborative electronic catalog, under the Polaris series. She is also the founder of the B.You project.

She's worked with international organisations such as Samsung, Global citizen festival and others.

She has co-hosted events in Ghana and abroad such as Miss Malaika, MTN Hitmaker, Global Citizen Festival, VGMA's, Grammy Africa Nominee Brunch, Gitex Africa.

== Personal life ==
Berla Mundi is married to David Tabi where they had their wedding on 5 January 2024 in a private ceremony in Accra.

=== Shows hosted ===
Year	Title	Network
2013 - 2016	Rhythmz Live	GHone
2017	Glitterati	GHone
2018	The Late Afternoon Show	GHone
2014 - 2018	Miss Malaika	GHone
2017 - present	MTN Hitmaker	GHone, TV3
2018 - 2020	Vodafone Ghana Music Awards (VGMA)	GHone, DSTV, TV3...
2019 - present	New Day- Morning show	TV3
2019 - present	The Day Show	TV3
2020 - present	COVID-19 360	TV3
2022	Global Citizen festival - Accra	Global Citizen
2024	66th Grammy's African Nominee Brunch	Grammy

== Awards and recognition ==
- Best female events MC – Ghana Events Awards (2017).
- TV female entertainment show host of the year. – RTP Awards (2018)
- Favorite TV presenter – Peoples choice celebrity awards (2017).
- Media Personality of the year – Glitz Style Awards (2018).
- Most Influential Media Personality- Avance Media (2020).
- Ghana Woman of the Year, Young Star Award(2020).
- TVET Ambassador.
- Speaker - Global Citizen Now conference

== See also ==
- The Giovani's prank game
- Berla helps young Susan get scholarship and support
- She organized the b.you conference under her career guidance project for young women
