= DJ Black =

Panamanian recording artist (born 1972)

- Born: Ricardo Alexander O’Neil Weeks; 2 July 1972 (age 54)
- Origin: Panama City, Panama
- Genre: Reggaeton
- Occupations: Rapper, music executive, Director of Culture (Panama)
- Years active: 2005-present
- Label: Moreno Music Group
- Website: www.djblack507.com

Ricardo Alexander O’Neil Weeks (born 2 July 1972), better known by his stage name DJ Black or DJ Negro, is a Panamanian recording artist, songwriter, producer and music executive. In 2008 DJ Black wrote the smash hit "Chucha Su Madre" which was the number one record in Panama for several months. Since 2008, DJ Black's song "Chucha Su Madre" has been the subject of both controversy and praise. It went straight to number 1 in the Panama radio and video charts and was featured in Carnival 2008. Due to its use of the words "Chucha Su Madre"(which in English translation means "Mother Fucker") the government of Panama censored the song. This action meant that DJ Black was unable to claim the official "El Rey De Carnival" crown. Despite this fact, DJ Black performed the song for millions; and the single itself continues to set records for most often played track on Panamanian radio. Due to his rising popularity among the country's common communities, DJ Black has recently been appointed by President Ricardo Martinelli to be the Director/Minister of Culture

== Music career ==
DJ Black began his career at 14 years old in the mid 80's as founder and member of the dance group "The World Condition" consisting of 6 members, including DJ Black, Johnny, Sambo, Juny, Nel, and Chichi. In the 90's, DJ Black returned to music but this time as a rapper recording the songs Sinforoso, La Ingrata, El Celular, Baile Del Pique and Vengo Caliente, which gained him a lot of notoriety throughout Panama. In 2005, DJ Black recorded "Ratata" (the remix of the Wisin & Yandel hit song "Rakata") which spoke about how Panamanian Reggaeton acts don't get the same amount of attention as Puerto Rican artists even though Reggaeton was started in Panama. DJ Black recorded the song alongside fellow Panamanian rapper Danger Man who would later be shot and killed.

=== "Chucha Su Madre" ===
After a couple years of absence, he returned with the controversial hit song "Chucha Su Madre" which would become his biggest hit to date. The song speaks of the political corruption and poor treatment of the lower class in Panama. Chucha Su Madre has broken many records including most nationwide spins and was eventually censored due to its lyrics but still continues to get airplay in Panama, Colombia, Costa Rica and Ecuador. With the success of Chucha Su Madre, DJ Black gained the attention of many people outside of Panama including the U.S. which landed him several meetings with reps from MTV and G-Unit Records. He is still in the midst of negotiations with other companies. (Chucha Su Madre was released as a digital download in the U.S. as of 3 September 2010.) In May 2012, Complex Magazine named "Chucha Su Madre" as the #3 song on its list of Top 10 Most Disrespectful "Your Mother" songs of all time.

=== "Los Locos Somos Mas" ===
In 2009 DJ Black wrote another hit record "Los Locos Somos Mas" which became the slogan for the campaign of Panamanian Presidential candidate Ricardo Martinelli. The song helped Martinelli win the presidency and earned DJ Black the position of Director of Culture in the Panamanian government.

== Personal life ==
DJ Black has one son (Kevin Weeks) and previously served in Panama as the government's Director/Minister of Culture. He is also Vice President of Moreno Music Group, along with relative, business partner and CEO, Cesar Moreno.

== Discography ==
=== Mixtapes ===
- 2010: El Rey De 507
- 2008: Sencillos y Otras

=== Compilation albums ===
- 2000: PANJAM 2000 - various artists

== Charts and sales ==
Year	Single	Chart positions			Certifications (Panama)
Year	Single	Panamanian Top 40	Colombian Charts	Ecuadorian Charts	Certifications (Panama)
2008	"Chucha Su Madre"	1	40	38	Gold
2009	"Los Locos Somos Mas"	21	--	--	--
