= Giovani Caleb =

Ghanaian media personality

- Born: Caleb Elolo Adjomah; 27 May 1988 (age 38)
- Education: Bishop Herman College, University of Ghana
- Occupations: Television and radio personality, MC
- Years active: 2008–present
- Spouse: Belinda Boadu

Caleb Elolo Adjomah (born 27 May 1988) popularly known as Giovani Caleb is a Ghanaian television personality and radio personality. As Master of Ceremonies, he has also hosted events, including the Ghana Club 100 Awards, MTN Hitmaker, the AFRIMA Music Village show (2018), 2019 Ghana Business Awards and the Vodafone Ghana Music Awards Red Carpet show.

== Education ==
Caleb completed his second cycle education at the Bishop Herman College and graduated from the University of Ghana with a bachelor's degree in Psychology and Linguistics. He also holds a Diploma (HRM) from the Institute of Commercial Marketers-UK.

== Career ==
Caleb started his career in the media industry on radio in 2008 with Radio Univers when he was in his second year in the University of Ghana. He joined Global Media Alliance and rose through the ranks to become the programs manager for YFM. He landed his first role as a TV presenter on Late Nite Celebrity Show on eT.V Ghana. He then moved to EIB Network's Live FM in 2015. He was the host of Starr Drive on Starr FM before leaving to join Media General's TV3 Network and host of 3FM Drive. He was later joined by Berla Mundi as a co-host. Giovani Caleb later became the host of Ghana's most popular show now 'Date Rush'.

== Giovani's prank game ==
Giovani's prank game is a prank call led by Giovani Caleb with assistance from Berla Mundi on the 3FM Drive which won the Best Radio Program of the Year at the 2019 RTP Awards. The game is targeted at siblings, celebrities and relationships. Notable victims include Joey B, Kwabena Kwabena, Naa Ashorkor, Ameyaw Debrah, and Israel Laryea.

== Personal life ==
Caleb is married to Belinda Boadu with kids.

== Ambassador roles ==
Caleb is the brand ambassador for Malta Guinness and a supporter of the UNCHR's Luquluqu Tribe. He also worked as a social media influencer of brands such as Jumia, South Africa Tourism, Hyundai Ghana and Infinix Note 7.

== Awards and nominations ==
Year	Ceremony	Award	Recipient	Result	Ref
2019	Ghana Music & Arts Awards Europe	Radio presenter of the Year	Himself	Nominated	
2019	National Communication Honors	Radio Host of the Year	Himself	Nominated	
2019	National Communication Honors	Radio Program of the Year	3FM Drive	Nominated	
2019	RTP Awards	Best Radio Program of the Year	3FM Drive	Won	
2019	EMY Africa Awards	The Pav Ansah Communicator Award	Himself	Won	
2019	Ghana Entertainment Awards	Male TV Personality of the Year	Himself	Nominated	
2018	EMY Africa Awards	Man of the Year (Communication)	Himself	Nominated	
2018	Ghana Event Awards	Best Male MC	Himself	Won	
2018	RTP Awards	Best Entertainment Host of the Year	Himself	Nominated	
2017	RTP Awards	Late Afternoon Show Host of the Year	Himself	Won	
2016	RTP Awards	Late Afternoon Show Host of the Year	Himself	Won	
2015	RTP Awards	The Late Night Celebrity Show	Himself	Nominated	
