= Doreen Andoh =

Ghanaian media personally

- Born: 5 July 1972
- Occupation: Broadcaster Journalist

Doreen Andoh is a Ghanaian radio personality, brand ambassador, occasional TV personality, and events host. She has been in radio for more than 30 years hence she is one of the longest serving presenters on the Ghanaian scene.

She is currently the presenter for Cosmopolitan Mix, a mid-morning radio show on Joy FM and she is often described as the queen of Ghanaian radio.

== Awards ==
Doreen was the first woman to receive the Best Presenter of the Year award in 2001. She has been awarded the status of the Queen of the Airwaves by Leading Ladies' Network, and in 2013 she won outstanding female presenter at the Ghana Women's Awards.
