= Akwaaba Magic =

Ghanaian digital satellite and general entertainment channel

- Country: Ghana

Programming
- Language: English
- Picture format: 16:9 (576i, SDTV); 1080i (HDTV)

Ownership
- Owner: MultiChoice (Canal+ S.A.)
- Sister channels: M-Net; SuperSport; Africa Magic; Maisha Magic; Zambezi Magic; Pearl Magic; Channel O

History
- Launched: 8 March 2021; 5 years ago

Links
- Website: akwaabamagic.dstv.com/West/home

Availability

Terrestrial
- DStv: Channel 150

Akwaaba Magic is a Ghanaian digital satellite and general entertainment channel. Owned by pay-TV operator M-Net, the 24 hour channel offers a mix of locally produced content for the Ghanaian market ranging from Drama, Telenovela, Comedy, Music, Documentaries as well as Reality Shows. MultiChoice has announced in September 2020 that the channel will roll out on its DStv pay-TV satellite service in 2021.

In February 2021, DStv confirmed that Akwaaba Magic will launch and would be broadcast in high-definition from 9 March 2021.

== Programs ==
- Dede
- Inside Out
- Rollie and Andy: Magic in Us
- Sankofa
- Sheroes of Our Time
