= Naa Ashorkor =

Ghanaian media personality and actress

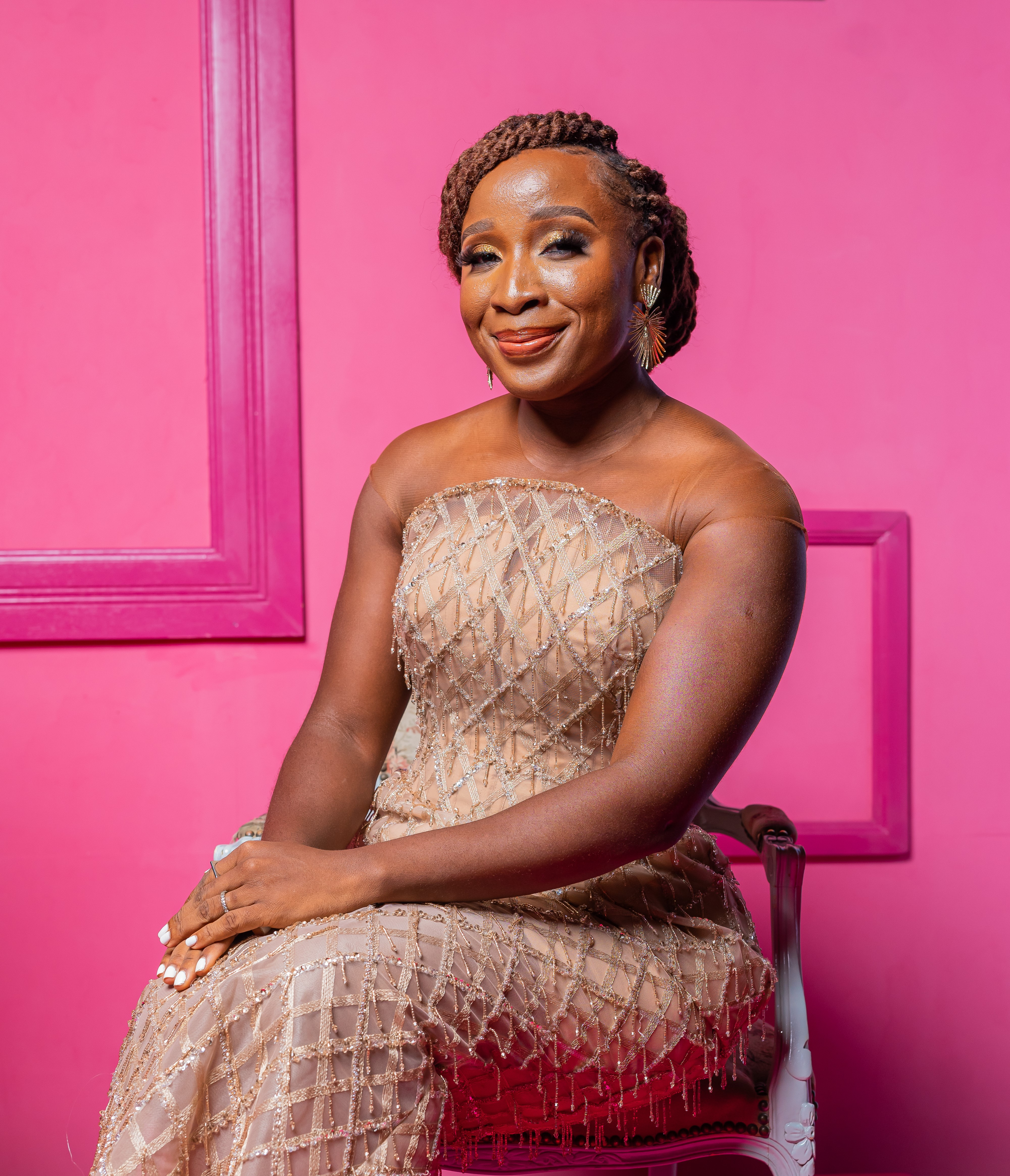
- Naa Ashorkor at 3Music Awards 2022
- Born: Nisirine Naa Ashorkor Mensah-Doku; 24 November 1988 (age 37)
- Occupations: Broadcast journalist and actress
- Years active: 2009–present
- Employer: Media General
- Organization: TV3 Ghana
- Spouse: Ahuma Cabutey Adodoadji

Naa Ashorkor (born 24 November 1988), also known as Nisirine Naa Ashorkor Mensah-Doku, is a Ghanaian actress, media personality and theatre director who works at Media General Limited, the parent company of TV3 Ghana.

Before joining the Media General Limited, she worked with Asaase Radio, an Accra-based radio station. She is known for starring in The Perfect Picture (2009) and Iroko TV's Poisoned Bait.

In 2010, she won Best Actress at the Africa Movie Academy Awards for her role in The Perfect Picture. Ashorkor also starred alongside Yvonne Okoro, Joselyn Dumas, and John Dumelo.

== Career ==
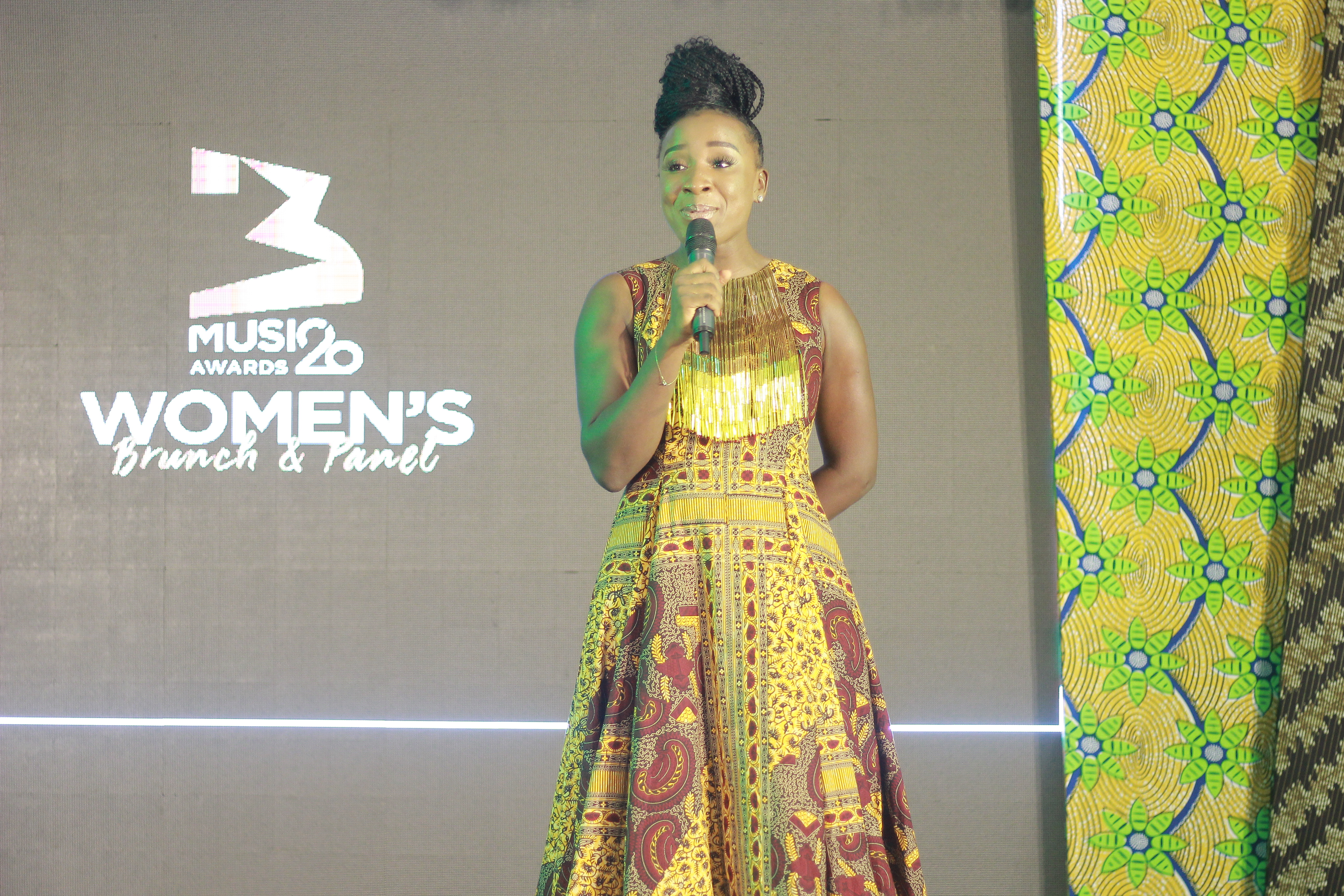
Ashorkor hosting the 3Music Awards Women's Brunch 2020

Ashorkor, along with Chris Attoh, hosted the 2016 Vodafone Ghana Music Awards. She also hosted the Miss Malaika Ghana pageant for eight years. Askorkor began working as a presenter with Starr 103.5 FM where she hosted the mid-morning show titled The Zone.

In 2008, she made her film debut in Scorned, directed by Shirley Frimpong-Manso.

She was a presenter with the Multimedia Group from 2017 to 2020, where she hosted Showbiz A-Z and Strong and Sassy. She moved to Asaase Radio at the end of June 2020 and began hosting the shows Between Hours and Just Us. In March 2021, she hosted the 3Music Awards.

She is a businesswoman who runs Jaarno, a digital food market, and April Communications, a theatre production company.

Ashorkor serves as a brand ambassador for Unilever Ghana and Verna Mineral Water. She is also associated with DKT International Ghana as the Lydia Contraceptives brand ambassador.

Ashorkor has appeared in several television commercials, including Tigo Ghana's "Drop That Yam" and the Yensor Nkoaa commercials.

On 1 June 2024, she co-hosted the 25th Telecel Ghana Music Awards with Chris Attoh.

== Stage performances and directorial work ==
Ashorkor has been involved in Ghana's modern stage movement, with performances and directorial ventures that explore complex social themes.

In June 2024, Ashorkor made her directorial debut with The Legend of Aku Sika written by Professor Martin Owusu.

She performed a solo role in the Spanish monologue Five Hours with Mario on the international stage.

She also directed and starred in Beyond the Walls, a prison theatre production staged at Ghana's National Theatre. The play focusses on the lives of incarcerated women and advocates for rehabilitation through the arts.

=== Recognition ===
In addition to accolades for her work in film and broadcasting, Ashorkor has received recognition for her artistic contributions on both local and international platforms. She is known for championing stories that center women's voices, health, and empowerment.

== Personal life ==
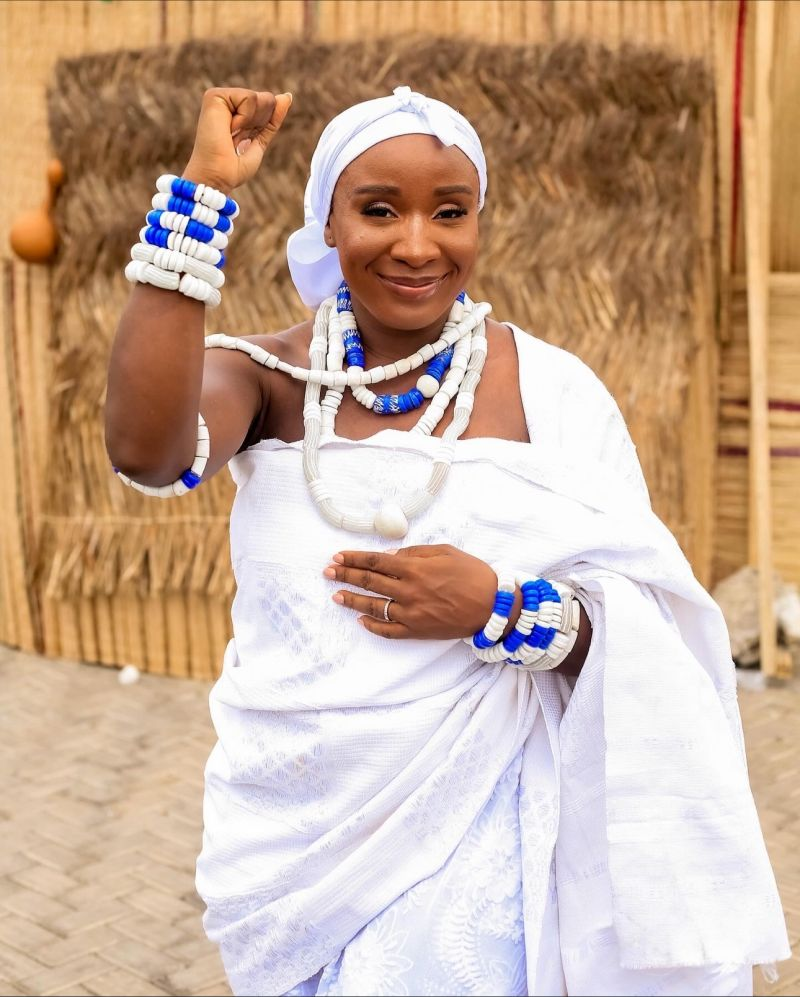
Ashokor

Ashorkor married her long-time partner Ahuma Cabutey Adodoadji, in 2014. On 15 August 2017, she announced the birth of her first son through news outlets and social media. She announced the birth of her second son on 1 July 2019.

== Filmography ==
Film

Year	Title	Role	Notes
2025	For Love and Country	Dorothy Annan	Lead role
2024	Evor	Lawyer Jean Asiamah	Drama
2023	Nine	News Anchor	Fantasy thriller
2020	Adam The First	Bintu	Supporting role
2020	Aloe Vera	Veranda	Supporting role
2019	The Perfect Picture - Ten Years Later	Akasi Duah	Supporting role
2015	One More Day	Joe	Supporting role
2014	Letter From Adam	Kabuki	Supporting role
2014	Poisoned Bait	Kadijah	Supporting role
2010 - 2013	Adams Apples	Kukuaa	Lead role
2010	Checkmate	Naana	Supporting role
2009	Double	Zulaika	Supporting role
2009	The Perfect Picture	Akasi	Lead role. Won 3 African Movie Awards for Lead Role, Best Performer by Actor in Supporting Role & Best Director
2008	Scorned	Soraya	Supporting role

Television

Year	Title	Roles	Notes
2022	3Music Awards 2022	Herself (co-host)	Television special
2021	3Music Awards 2021	Herself (co-host)	Television special
2020	Exclusive Men of the Year (EMY) Awards	Herself (host)	Television special
2017	Peoples Celebrity Awards	Herself (host)	Television special
2017	3rd Edition of the American Ghanaian Chicken Recipe Competition	Herself (host)	Television special
2016	Exclusive Men of the Year (EMY) Awards	Herself (host)	Television special
2016	Vodafone Ghana Music Awards	Herself (co-host)	Television special
2015	Just The Law	Herself (host)	Law show
2013	African Movie Academy Awards	Herself (host)	Television special
2012 - 2017	Tales From the Powder Room	Herself (host)	Girl talk & discussion series
2010 - 2012	Miss Malaika Grand Finale	Herself (host)	Television special
2011 - 2012	Close Up Salsa Fiesta	Herself (host)	Reality television series
2009 - 2016	Guess Who's Coming for Dinner	Herself (host)	Reality television series
2009 - Date	Miss Ghana	Herself (host)	Beauty pageant

Stage

Year	Title	Notes
2025	Beyond the Walls	Director
2024	Legend of Aku Sika	Directorial debut
2024	Five Hours with Mario	Lead role, director
2023	The Gods Are Not To Blame	Lead role, producer. Re-adaptation of the original Greek classic Oedipus Rex, authored by Nigeria's Ola Rotimi
2017	Bukom	Producer
2017	Prison Graduates	Producer. Political satire
2016	Dinner For Promotion	Supporting role. Comedy
2015	Don't Dress For Christmas	Lead role. Comedy
2015	Medicine For Love	Lead role, producer. Comedy
2013	Love Concert	Lead role
2012	His Birth In The 21st Century	Lead role. Re-adaptation of the birth of Jesus Christ
2011	Run For Your Wife	Lead role. Adult comedy play
2010	The Vagina Monologues	Lead role. Episodic play

Radio

Year	Title	Network	Notes
2017– 2020	Strong and Sassy	Joy 99.7 FM	Female talk show
2017– 2020	Showbiz A to Z	Joy 99.7 FM	Weekend show. Entertainment review and analysis
2014 - 2017	The Zone	Starr 103.5 FM	Mid-morning show
