= TV3 Ghana =

Private, free-to-air television broadcaster in Ghana

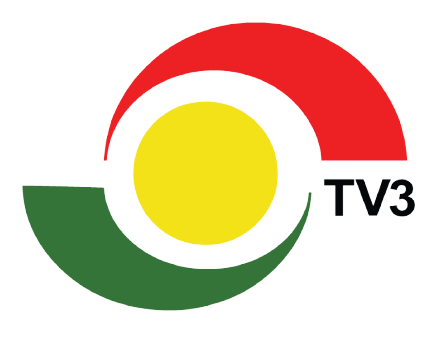
- Country: Ghana
- Broadcast area: Ghana
- Network: TV3 (1997–2011)
- Headquarters: Accra, Ghana

Programming
- Language: English

Ownership
- Owner: Media General Ghana Limited
- Key people: Beatrice Agyemang; Augustine Dickson

History
- Launched: 1st October, 1997; 29 years ago

Links
- Website: http://www.3news.com

TV3 is a Ghanaian free-to-air television network in Ghana. Launched in 1997 by Malaysian television company Sistem Televisyen Malaysia Limited, TV3 airs and produces a variety of television programmes, dramas and reality television and entertainment shows. It was taken over by a Ghanaian company called Media General Ghana Limited in 2011.

TV3 Ghana established itself as the most watched free-to-air television station in Ghana, having achieved 65% nationwide penetration at end-2006 and aiming to reach 90% by 2008. TV3 is a privately owned TV station in Ghana.

However, TV3 has experienced major competition in the likes of Metro TV which has succeeded not only in broadcasting its network to all the regions in the country but it also struck a deal with South Africa's MultiChoice allowing it to be broadcast throughout Africa. Despite this, TV3 remains popular for its showing of Mexican telenovelas, Korean series and music and a variety of local and foreign movies.

== History ==
The channel was created in 1996 by TV3 (Malaysia)'s overseas unit Amity Valley Sdn Bhd from the takeover of the Ghana Film Unit for the price of US$1.4 million over a period of fifteen years, divesting the unit from the government. The GFU had existed as far back as 1948. Broadcasts started the following year.

By December 2001, TV3 (Malaysia)'s Amity Valley was pressuring Eddie Addo to buy almost a third of the channel's shares. In 2002, TV3 started broadcasting to Kumasi and expanded its broadcasting hours.

== Programming ==
=== Current ===
==== News ====
- Newday
- News Central
- Weekend Central
- News 360
- Ghana Tonight
- The Key Points
- Hot Issues

==== Reality ====
- Date Rush
- Talented Kidz
- Mentor
- Ghana's Most Beautiful

==== Sports ====
- Sports Station
- Sports Daily
- GPL Xpress

=== Overseas ===
- Beauty and the Beast

==== Comedy ====
- Home Improvement
- Family Feud Africa (localised version, hosted by U.S. host Steve Harvey)

==== Children's ====
- Aladdin
- Barney & Friends
- Dennis the Menace
- Dennis and Gnasher
- Basket Fever
- Betty's Voyage
- Cedric the Crow
- Conan the Adventurer
- Dennis and Gnasher
- G.I. Joe: A Real American Hero (1983 TV series)
- Legends of the Hidden Temple
- The Lion King's Timon & Pumbaa
- Max Steel
- Ocean Girl
- Postman Pat
- Power Rangers
- Roughnecks: Starship Troopers Chronicles
- Return to Jupiter
- Talented Kids
- Teen Wolf
- Teletubbies
- Thunderstone
- Tweenies
- Tommy and Oscar
- Ben 10
- Generator Rex
- LazyTown

==== Drama ====
- Desperate Housewives
- Hill Street Blues

== Staff ==
=== Present ===
- Berla Mundi
- Giovani Caleb
- Noella Donkor
- Alfred Akrofi Ocansey
- Bernice Awenlie Abu-Baidoo
- Portia Gabor
- Naa Ashorkor Mensah-Doku
- AJ Akuoko-Sarpong
- Anita Akua Akuffo
- Cookie Tee
- Roland Walker
- Regina Van-Helvert
- Sika Osei
- Martin Asiedu-Dartey
- Helen Appiah-Ampofo
- Noble Crosby Annan
- Keminni Amanor
- Eric Mawuena Egbeta
- Beatrice Adu
- Godwin Namboh
- Grace Amoah Agyemang
- Mutala Yakubu
- Owuraku Ampofo
- Bill Eshun
- Aniella Allotey
- Akosua Adjei
- Asieduwaa Afanyi

=== Past ===
- Bridget Otoo
- Nana Aba Anamoah
- Komla Adom
- Wendy Laryea
- Josephine Antwi Adjei
- Godwin Asediba
- Gideon Aryeequaye
- Paul Adom Otchere

== See also ==
- Media of Ghana
- TV3 - former sister television station in Malaysia
