= List of radio stations in Greater Accra Region =

Eighty-two FM radio stations operate in the Greater Accra Region of Ghana.

List of radio stations in Greater Accra Region
Name	Frequency (MHz)	Type	Owner	Location
Rainbow Radio	87.5	Commercial	Omega 3 Communication Limited	Adabraka
De Youngi FM	87.7	Community	De Youngi FM	Oyarifa
Atlantis Radio	87.9	Commercial	Mascott Multi-Services Limited	Accra
Magic 88.1 FM	88.1	Commercial	Magic Broadcasting Limited	Accra
	88.3	Commercial	Impact Media Limited	Accra
Sunny 88.7 FM	88.7	Commercial	Sky Broadcasting Company Limited	Accra
R FM	88.9	Commercial	Resurrection Broadcasting Limited	Accra
Prime FM	89.1	Commercial	Primetime Media Investment Limited	Abelemkpe
Radio France Internationale	89.5	Public foreign	Radio France Internationale	Accra
Max FM	89.7	Commercial	Imax Media Limited	Santeo
Pluzz FM	89.9	Commercial	Dear Mama Joint Limited	West Hills Mall
Mothers FM	Online Radio	Accra	The Mothers Media	North Ridge Accra
Radio Gold	90.5	Commercial	Network Broadcasting Limited	Accra
Breeze FM	90.9	Commercial	Ad-Libs Multimedia Co. Ltd.	McCarthy Hill
	91.1	Community	Legon Cities Radio LBG	Bawleshie
Class FM	91.3	Commercial	Great FM Limited	Accra
Guide Radio	91.5	Commercial	Press Xpress Limited	Accra
Live FM	91.9	Commercial	Quest Fine Limited	Accra
Sweet Rhythms FM	92.1	Commercial	A and P Multimedia, formerly First Eye Enterprise	Accra
Ahotor FM	92.3	Commercial	Universal Company Limited	Accra
Soyeya FM	92.5	Community	Soyeya FM	Ashaiman
3 FM	92.7	Commercial	Aewaha Company Ltd.	Accra
Kessben FM	92.9	Commercial	Trinity FM Limited	Accra
Radio XYZ	93.1	Commercial	XYZ Broadcasting Limited	Accra
Amanie FM	93.3	Community	Amanie Community Radio Station	Laterbiokorshie
Radio Ada	93.3	Community	Ghana Community Broadcasting Services	Ada
Vision 1 FM	93.5	Commercial	Vision 1 FM Limited	St Johns
Hot FM	93.9	Commercial	F. P. Communications Limited	Accra
Sweet Melodies FM	94.3	Commercial	Sweet Melodies FM Ltd.	Accra
Asempa FM	94.7	Commercial	Bell Communications Limited	Accra
Whiz FM	94.9	Commercial	1962 Media Investment Limited	Accra
Onua FM	95.1	Commercial	Victory Broadcasting	Accra
Uniiq FM	95.7	Public	Ghana Broadcasting Corporation	Accra
Wontumi Radio	95.9	Commercial	Wontumi Multimedia Limited	Accra
Radio Latenu	96.1	Community	Latenu Development Association	Labadi
PentVars Radio	96.1	Campus	Pentecost University College	Accra
	96.1	Community	Cob-A Foundation	Sege
Obonu FM	96.5	Public	Ghana Broadcasting Corporation	Tema
Citi FM	97.3	Commercial	Omni Media Company Limited	Accra
Radio GIJ	97.7	Campus	Ghana Institute of Journalism	Accra
Valley View Radio	97.7	Campus	Valley View University	Oyibi
	97.7	Community	Potters Media Foundation	Prampram
	97.7	Community	Osu Christianborg FM LBG	Osu
Power 97.9 FM	97.9	Commercial	Authentic Media Company Limited	Accra
Voice of America	98.1	Public foreign	Voice of America Service	Accra
	98.3	Community	Supreme Broadcasting LBG	Kasseh
Happy FM	98.9	Commercial	Global Media Alliance	Accra
Marhaba FM	99.3	Commercial	Marhaba Multimedia Limited	Nima
Asaase Radio	99.5	Commercial	ABC Radio Limited	Accra
Joy FM	99.7	Commercial	Multimedia Broadcasting Co. Ltd.	Accra
	99.9	Commercial	Semanhyia Communication Limited	Accra
Accra FM	100.5	Commercial	Gender Awareness Foundation	Accra
Neat FM	100.9	Commercial	Tower FM Limited	Accra
Dadi FM	101.1	Commercial	Dadi FM Company Limited	Accra
BBC Radio	101.3	Public foreign	BBC	Accra
	101.5	Commercial	Mfitiase FM Limited	Accra
Okay FM	101.7	Commercial	Paradise Vision Estates Ltd.	Accra
Zed 101.9 FM	101.9	Commercial	Zion Hill Multimedia Limited	Accra
SECOND CHANCE FM	102.1	Commercial	Second Chance Community Media Limited	Accra
Kasapa FM	102.5	Commercial	Sunshine Radio Limited	Accra
(Not on air)	102.7	Commercial	Jasil Media Limited	Accra
Angel FM	102.9	Commercial	Angel Broadcasting Services Limited	Accra
Top FM	103.1	Commercial	Top FM Limited	Accra
Starr FM	103.5	Commercial	Access World Broadcasting Co. Ltd.	Ringroad
Hitz FM	103.9	Commercial	Pearl Communications Ltd.	Accra
Peace FM	104.3	Commercial	Despite Company Limited	Accra
Plan B FM	104.5	Commercial	Free Minds Communications Limited	Tema
Atinka FM	104.7	Commercial	Sena Radio Limited	Accra
	104.9	Community	McDan Foundation	Kasseh
Radio Emashie	105.1	Community	Radio Emashie	Pokuase
	105.1	Community	Ahemaa Community Radio	Pig Farm
No.1 FM	105.3	Commercial	Agricult Company Limited	Accra
Goodlife FM	105.5	Commercial	Goodlife Broadcasting Company Limited	Accra
Radio Universe	105.7	Campus	University of Ghana	Accra
	106.1	Commercial	Hashcom Ghana Limited	Accra
Adom FM	106.3	Commercial	Aero Communications Ltd.	Accra
DLFM (Ghana)	106.9	Commercial	Bravo Multimedia Limited	Accra
Oman FM	107.1	Commercial	Oman FM Limited	Accra
(Not on air)	107.3	Commercial	123 FM Limited	Accra
Ezzy FM	107.5	Commercial	Azz Limited	Accra
Kingdom FM	107.7	Commercial	Mediawave Plus Communications Limited	Accra
YFM Ghana	107.9	Commercial	K & N Investments Ltd.	Accra

== See also ==
- Media of Ghana
- List of newspapers in Ghana
- List of radio stations in Ghana
- Telecommunications in Ghana
- New Media in Ghana
- National Communications Authority
