= Erastus Asare Donkor =

Ghanaian journalist (born 1976)

- Born: November 10, 1976 (age 49)
- Other name: Erastus
- Citizenship: Ghanaian
- Education: Christian Service University College (B.A.); Institute of Commercial Management (Diploma)
- Occupation: Broadcaster
- Employer: Multimedia Group Limited
- Organization: Nhyira FM
- Spouse: Maadwoa Okyerewa Osae

Erastus Asare Donkor (born 10 November 1976) is a Ghanaian broadcast, investigative, and environmental journalist known for his reporting on the impacts of illegal mining and climate change in Ghana. He is an Assisting News Editor with Multimedia Group Limited (Luv/Nhyira Fm, Joy/Adom FM, Joynews/Adom Tv, Myjoyonline.com and others) Donkor has received awards for his journalism, including the Journalist of the Year award from the Ghana Journalists Association at the PAV Ansah GJA awards.

== Education ==
He completed his secondary education at Konongo-Odumase Senior High School, followed by a Bachelor of Arts in Communication and Public Relations from Christian Service University College and a Master of Arts in Communication at the University of Cape Coast (UCC). He also earned a Diploma in Journalism from the Institute of Commercial Management.

== Career ==
Erastus Asare Donkor began his media career with Kapital Radio in Kumasi, where he worked as a reporter, news anchor, producer, and news editor. He later served as editor-in-chief at Radio Xtacy. He is currently a reporter and assisting editor with JoyFM, JoyNews, and Luv FM, all subsidiaries of Multimedia Group Limited.

== Controversies ==
In October 2024, Erastus Asare Donkor and two other staff members of the Multimedia Group Limited were reportedly attacked by armed individuals at a mining site near Asumenya, close to Manso Nkran in the Ashanti region. The attackers allegedly claimed to be associated with Edelmetallum Resources Limited.

== Personal life ==
He married Adwoa Okyerewa Osae in 2018.t They have three children.

== Awards ==
Year	Nominee / work	Award	Result
2022	Erastus Asare Donkor	Ghana Journalists Association (GJA), Journalist of the Year	Won
2023	Erastus Asare Donkor	PAV Ansah Communication Award, Communicator of the year	Won
2024	Erastus Asare Donkor	Order of the Volta, Member,	Won
