= Adom =

Adom may refer to:

- Ancient Domains of Mystery (ADoM), 1994 roguelike video game
- Adom (name), a list of people with the name

== Ghana ==
- Adom FM, Ghanaian radio station
- Adom Praiz, annual gospel music concert in Accra, Ghana
- Adom TV, Ghanaian television station operated by Multimedia Group Limited

== Israel ==
- Darom Adom, annual Israeli festival
- Magen David Adom, Israel's national emergency medical, disaster, ambulance and blood bank service
- Red Color, also known in Hebrew as Tzeva Adom, is an early warning radar system of the Israel Defence Forces
