= Presbyterian Boys' Senior High School =

Boarding senior high school for boys

Presbyterian Boys' Secondary School

Location
- Legon; Greater Accra; Ghana; 05°39′48″N 0°10′28″W

Information
- Type: Public high school
- Motto: Latin: In Lumine Tuo Videbimus Lumen
- Religious affiliation: Presbyterian Church
- Established: 1938; 88 years ago
- Founder: Presbyterian Church of the Gold Coast
- Head of school: David Odjija
- Faculty: 90
- Grades: Senior secondary years 1-3
- Gender: Boys
- Age: 14 to 19
- Enrollment: 3,000
- Campus type: Suburban
- Houses: 15
- Color: Blue
- Mascot: Ɔdadeɛ (Baobab); Presecan
- Nickname: Blue Magicians/Presecans
- Website: preseclegon.edu.gh

Presbyterian Boys' Secondary School (PRESEC, Legon) is a secondary boarding school for boys. It is located in Legon, Accra, Ghana. It was founded in 1938, under the auspices of the Presbyterian Church of the Gold Coast. The Basel missionary-theologian, Nicholas Timothy Clerk (1862–1961), who served as the first Synod Clerk of the Presbyterian Church of the Gold Coast from 1918 to 1932, used his tenure to advocate for the establishment of the secondary school. The school has ties with its sister schools, Aburi Girls' Senior High School and Krobo Girls Senior High School.

The school's crest has a shield with the Presbyterian symbol (the St Andrew Cross-Scottish flag with the Swiss flag embedded and a burning torch in the middle) with the motto of the school, "In Lumine Tuo Videbimus Lumen", meaning "In Thy Light We Shall See Light", scrolled beneath the shield. The school was originally located in Odumase - Krobo in the Eastern Region of Ghana before moving to its current location in Legon, in 1968.

The school anthem is "Happy Are We", written by J. L. Anang and transcribed by Stephen Appiah Danquah. The school is a nine-time Ghana National Science and Maths Quiz winner. The alumni of the school are referred to as "Ɔdadeɛ". The school is often referred to as a science school but even though majority of the students are science students the school offers other programs like Business, Agricultural science, Visual arts and General Arts.

== History ==
=== Odumase campus (1938–1968) ===
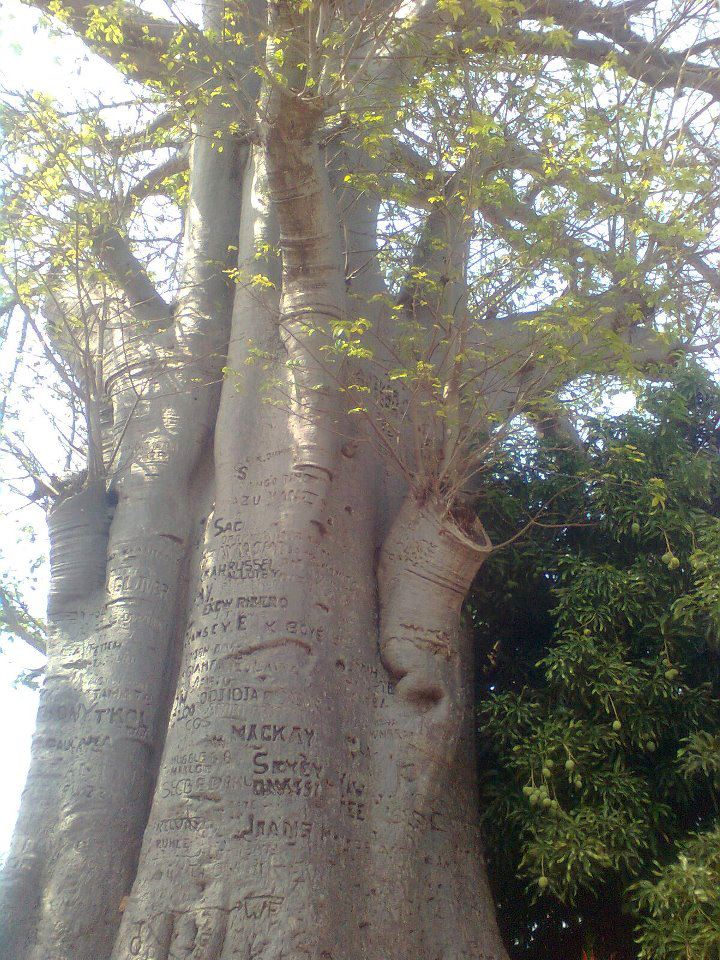
ɔdadeɛ" (baobab tree)

The school was started in Odumase after an educationist of the Presbyterian Church of the Gold Coast, E. A. W. Engmann, continued to lobby and push for the establishment of a church boys' school, after N. T. Clerk had retired from his church position. This effort came to fruition in 1938 with the first group of 16 boys and four teachers. Engmann was the first headmaster.

The Odumase campus housed German missionaries, then a primary school and then a government survey school before becoming the Presbyterian Boys' Secondary School.

One of the traditions of the school is the "ɔdadeɛ" (baobab tree) located on the campus. An alumnus of the school is referred to as "Ɔdadeɛ". The baobab tree is a Ghanaian symbol of knowledge, resourcefulness and strength. New students were traditionally initiated at the feet of this tree clad in bedsheets and powdered faces. PRESEC was located here until 1968 when it was moved to its current location at Legon, Mile 9.

=== Legon campus (1968 to date) ===
In September 1968, the new campus at Legon just north east of the University of Ghana campus at Mile 9, received its first set of students. At the new campus, it continued as a boys' boarding secondary school until the mid-1970s when the sixth form was upgraded to the National Science College. Female students were admitted into the sixth form in small numbers from September 1975. They continued to be part of the student body until June 1996 when the last batch left.

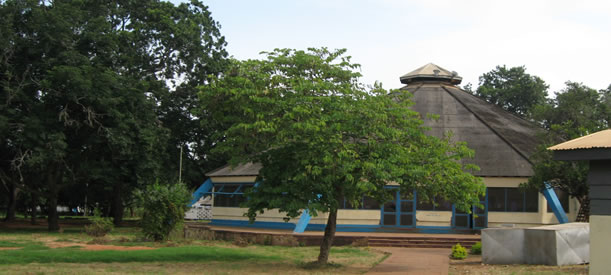
PRESEC dining hall

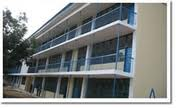
Classroom facilities of the Presbyterian Boys' Secondary School

The Legon campus started with four student boarding houses. Three were named after notable Presbyterian leaders as Kwansa House, Clerk House and Engmann House. The fourth was named Akro House after the people of Krobo Odumase. The next two houses to be built were Riis House and Labone House. With the completion of the National Science College buildings, Ako-Adjei House and Owusu-Parry House were added (the latter named after the first Senior Prefect). Another house, House 9, admitted its first residents in September 2010 as well as a new house, House 10.

== Campus ==
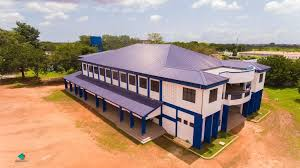
PRESEC Legon Assembly Hall

=== Houses ===
- Kwansa House
- Clerk House
- Engmann House
- Akro House
- Riis House
- Labone House
- Ako-Adjei House
- Owusu-Parry House
- House 9
- P. T. A. House
- The 14 City
- Ofori Sarpong House (House 15)

== Extracurricular activities ==
=== Alliance ===
Presbyterian Boys' Secondary School, PRESEC has an ongoing alliance with their fellow Presbyterian Girls' school, Aburi Girls' Secondary School, ABUGISS. The alliance is known as PRE-GISS.

=== Odadeɛ Radio ===
In December 2021, the 1981 year group of the alumni of the school launched an internet radio station called Odadeɛ Radio to serve both the school and its alumni and others worldwide. It is claimed that this is the first Senior High School in Ghana to have its own radio station. The station was established to generate increased interest by the students in media studies fields such as journalism, news reporting, photography and media management. It is also to support educational activities of the school and the mentorship programmes of the alumni. The first manager of the radio station is John Addo-Fening of the 1981 alumnus who is also the Chief Executive Officer of Rite 90.1 FM radio station.

== Awards and recognition ==
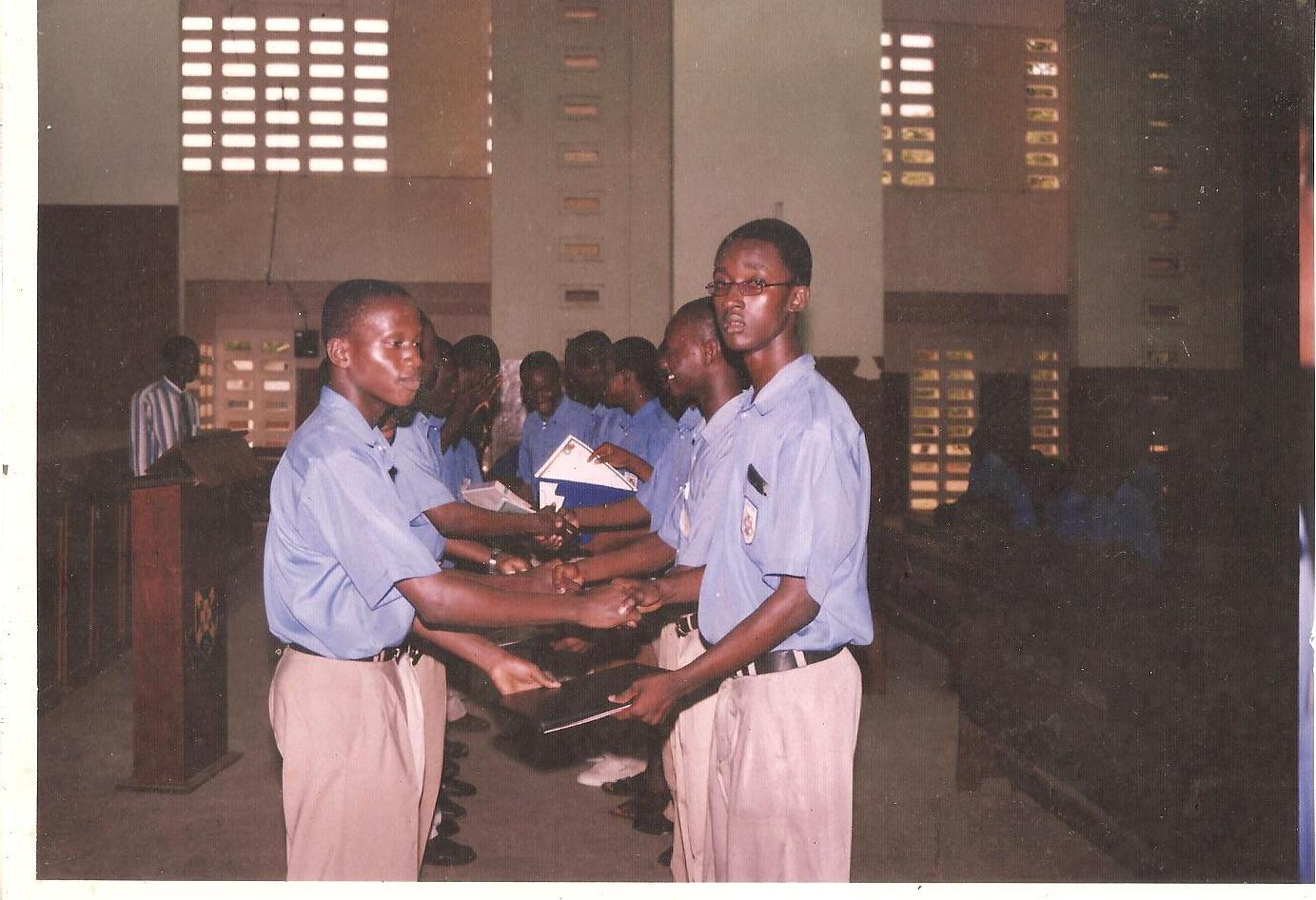
2002 Civic Education Club handing-over ceremony

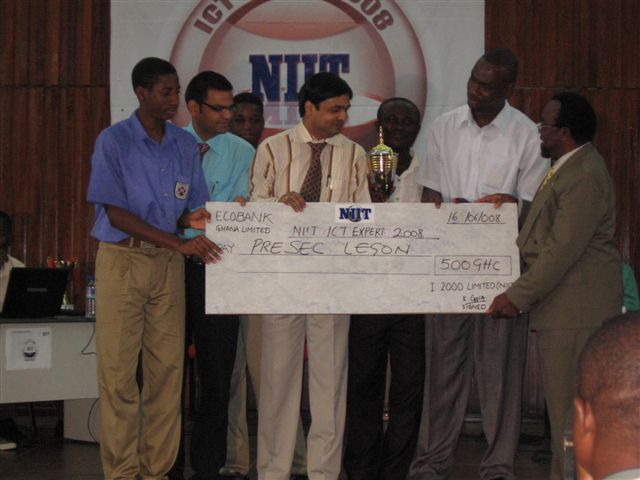
PRESEC wins NIIT, 2008.

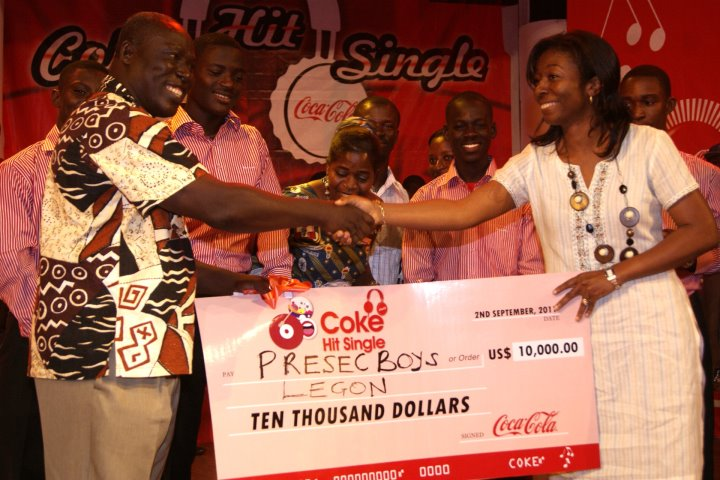
PRESEC wins Coke Hits, 2011

Initial PRESEC, Legon emblem

=== 1990s ===
- PRESEC regularly had one of the best GCE O-level and A-level results prior to the change of the national examination system to the BECE and WASSCE.
- In 1995, the school won the second edition of the Ghana National Science and Maths Quiz competition. PRESEC Southern Sector Champions, defeated Opoku Ware School, Northern Sector Champions in the Final of Finals.
- In 1999, the school won four of the seven WAEC (West African Examinations Council) Excellence Awards for the best individual performances in the final examinations for over 500 secondary schools.

=== 2000s ===
- In 2002, at the National Constitution Quiz organized by the National Commission for Civic Education, PRESEC Civic Education Club emerged winners of the competition.
- In 2003, PRESEC repeated the feat of 1995 by defeating Opoku Ware School in the National Science and Maths Quiz competition. A student from that winning team was later adjudged the overall best performance in the WAEC (West African Examinations Council) SSSCE examinations that year.
- On 1 July 2006, the school won the National Science and Maths Quiz for a third time. The school was given the competition trophy for keeps. PRESEC defeated St. Peter's Secondary School, then defending champions, in the final.
- On 16 June 2008, PRESEC emerged winners of the National Title of NIIT ICT Expert 2008 in Kumasi, after beating the regional champions: St. James Seminary SHS, Sunyani (Brong-Ahafo), Opoku Ware School, Kumasi (Ashanti Region), St. Augustine's College, Cape Coast (Central Region) and Baidoo Bonsoe SHS, Takoradi (Western Region) with 78 schools competing also at the regional levels.
- On 8 July 2008, PRESEC won the National Science and Math Quiz for a fourth time. The school defeated Opoku Ware School in the final. This was the third time PRESEC had defeated Opoku Ware in the final.
- On 24 June 2009, not only did PRESEC win the quiz competition for the fifth time, but they also became the first school ever to successfully defend their title as National Champions. PRESEC defeated Achimota School in the final.

=== 2010s ===
- In 2010, two PRESEC students represented Ghana and won a bronze medal at the International Junior Science Olympiad (IJSO) held in Abuja, Nigeria, out of 35 countries across the world.
- In 2010, a student was honoured at the WASSCE 2009 Excellence Awards Ceremony, as Best Candidate in the General Science Programme, the National Best Candidate and then the Overall Best Candidate in West Africa; and a student was Overall Best in the Business Programme.
- On 13 May 2011, the school won the VRA 50th Anniversary Inter-Schools Debate Competition beating Mfantsipim School in the finals of the competition.
- In September 2011, the school won the Sprite Ball Inter-Schools Basketball Championship, defeating defending champions, Achimota School 10-8 in the finals.
- On 2 September 2011, the school won the maiden edition of the "Coke Hit Single". The competition featured musical talents from 32 senior high schools who vied for the ultimate title of "Coke Hit Single" - Best high school musical talents in Ghana.
- In March 2013, during the WASSCE 2012 Excellence Awards, a student was judged the Overall Best Candidate in the General Arts Program in the West African Examinations Council's examinations (West African Examinations Council) conducted throughout the West African sub-region; in a year where the Council recorded its highest number 'ever' of candidates meeting its minimum eligibility criterion for the excellence awards, that is 8 grade A1s - (530 candidates out of the total 174,385 candidates who sat for the May/June WASSCE in 2012).
- 2016 - The Speaker of Parliament of Ghana, Aaron Mike Ocquaye (Class of 1962), as well as 15 Members of Parliament who are alumni, were elected to the 7th Parliament of the Fourth Republic.
- In December 2019, a PRESEC student represented Ghana and won Silver Medal at the International Junior Science Olympiad (IJSO) in Doha, Qatar - the first time a Ghanaian had won Silver Medal at the Olympiad; until then, previous medalists from Ghana had won Bronze.

=== 2020s ===
- On 8 October 2020, the school won the National Maths and Science Quiz contest for the sixth time by beating Adisadel College and Opoku Ware Senior High School in the finals.
- In March 2022, Mr Kwame Brako Asante was adjudged the overall best WASSCE candidate in Ghana and won the 2nd prize in West Africa at WAEC's 2021 International Excellence Awards.
- On 26 October 2022, PRESEC defeated Prempeh College and Adisadel College to win the NSMQ competition for the seventh time.
- In March 2023, Ato Kwamena Quansah was named the best business student in the 2022 WASSCE.
- PRESEC won The Sharks Quiz competition in 2020 and 2023.
- On 30 October 2023, PRESEC defeated Achimota School and Opoku Ware School to win the NSMQ competition for the eighth time.
- In March 2025, Mr Benedict Ofori Debrah was adjudged the second runner-up in the 2024 WASSCE exams.
- On 7 October 2025, PRESEC won the 6th edition of the Energy Commission’s Renewable Energy Competition beating Ahantaman Girls’ SHS, who took the second place, Ola Girls’ SHS, Kenyasi taking the third position, Dabokpa Technical Institute taking the fourth position, Adidome SHS taking the fifth position and Damongo SHS who was the sixth.
- On 10 September 2026, PRESEC won its ninth NSMQ trophy after defeating Accra Academy and St. Augustine's College.

== Notable alumni ==
=== Politics, government, and public policy ===
- Bryan Acheampong - Member of Parliament for Abetifi since July 2016
- Collins Adomako-Mensah - Member of Parliament for Afigya Kwabre North
- J. B. Danquah Adu - Member of Parliament for Akim Abuakwa North
- Kwadwo Agyei-Addo - Former Member of Parliament for Fanteakwa
- Lt. Gen. F. W. K. Akuffo - Head of State of Ghana (5 July 1978 – 4 June 1979)
- Vice Admiral Seth Amoama - Chief of the Defence Staff of the Ghana Armed Forces since January 2021.
- Michael Paul Ansah - Minister of State in the third republic
- Eugene Arhin- Director of Communications at the Presidency (2017-)
- Theodore Obo Asare Jnr - Economist and Member of Parliament for Akan Bowiri in the first republic
- Mark Assibey-Yeboah - Economist and Member of Parliament for New Juaben South 6th and 7th parliament, Chairman of the 7th Parliament's Finance Committee
- Kwaku Boateng - Minister of Education and Minister of Interior in the first republic
- Kwesi Botchwey - Ghana's longest-serving Minister of Finance (1982–1995), Chairman of Ghana National Gas Development Task Force
- Fuseini Issah - Member of Parliament - Okaikwei North since January 2017
- Lawrence Kpabitey Kodjiku - Regional Commissioner for the Ashanti Region (1975-1977), Regional Commissioner for the Greater Accra Region (1977-1979), Regional Commissioner for the Northern Region (June 1979-August 1979), and formerly Ghana's ambassador to Israel.
- Eric Oduro Osae - Director General of the internal audit agency of Ghana and Dean of Institute of Local Governance
- Bernard Okoe-Boye - Member of Parliament - Ledzokuku Constituency in the Greater Accra Region, Deputy Minister of Health
- Aaron Mike Oquaye - Speaker of the 7th Parliament of the 4th Republic (2017–2021), former Minister of Communication (2005–2009)
- Mike Oquaye Jnr - diplomat
- Oseadeeyo Kwasi Akuffo III - Omanhene (or paramount chief) of the Akuapem traditional area (Okuapeman) in Ghana
- Kofi Portuphy - former National Coordinator, National Disaster Management Organization and former National Chairman-National Democratic Congress
- Erasmus Isaac Preko - Member of parliament during the first republic, Minister of Fuel and Power (1965 – 1966)
- Andrews Kwabla Puplampu - Minister for Lands (1965 – 1966)
- Samuel Sarpong - Ashanti and Central Regional Minister (2014 - 2016)
- Bright Simons - IMANI Ghana and 2012 World Economic Forum (WEF), Young Global Leader (YGL)
- Alex Tettey-Enyo - former Minister of Education
- Daniel Nii Kwartei Titus Glover - Member of Parliament for Tema East since 2013
- Samuel Okudzeto Ablakwa - Member of Parliament - North Tongu, former Deputy Minister of Education (2013–2016), Minister of Foreign Affairs ( 2025 - )
- Ato Ulzen-Appiah - Director of the GhanaThink Foundation and named amongst most influential young Africans
- Kobla Mensah Wisdom Woyome - Member of Parliament for South Tongu
- Christian Tetteh Yohunu - Inspector General of Police

=== Academia ===
- Gilbert Ansre - Professor of Linguistics, University of Ghana and Bible translation expert
- Ernest Aryeetey - Vice-Chancellor of University of Ghana (2010–2016)
- E. Bamfo-Kwakye - Vice-Chancellor of Kwame Nkrumah University of Science and Technology (KNUST) (1974–1983)
- Kwabena Boahen - Professor of Bioengineering and Neuromorphic Engineering, Stanford University
- George C. Clerk - pioneering Ghanaian botanist and phytopathologist
- Nicholas T. Clerk - Ghanaian academic, administrator and Presbyterian minister, former Rector of GIMPA
- John Owusu Gyapong - vice chancellor of the University of Health and Allied Sciences
- Eric Yirenkyi Danquah - founding director of West Africa Centre for Crop Improvement (WACCI) and winner of the World Agriculture Prize (WAP)
- Bill Puplampu - Vice Chancellor of the Central University

=== Arts and entertainment ===
- Augustine Abbey - owner of Great Idikoko Ventures and President of Film Producers Association of Ghana
- Kwame Akoto-Bamfo - sculptor
- John Apea - actor and movie director
- Dancegod Lloyd - Ghanaian dancer and choreographer.
- Kwaku Sintim-Misa - Ghanaian actor, political satirist, and host of Thank God it's Friday

=== Sports ===
- Ezekiel Ansah - American football defensive end
- Reuben Ayarna - footballer, Defensive Midfielder for the Kuopion Palloseura in Finland
- Benjamin Azamati-Kwaku - Member of the Ghana 4×100 relay team and International Champion
- Isaac Kissi - footballer
- Andrew Owusu - international triple jump champion

=== Corporate, business, and finance ===
- Jonathan Herbert Frimpong-Ansah - former governor of the Bank of Ghana
- Lucy Quist - first Ghanaian woman to become the CEO of a multinational telecommunications company in Ghana
- Patricia Obo-Nai - CEO of Vodafone Ghana
- Kris Senanu - Ghanaian Kenyan business executive

=== Law ===
- Nene Amegatcher - active Justice of the Supreme Court of Ghana (2018–2023)
- Kofi Barnes - Judge of the Ontario Superior Court of Justice in Canada
- Benjamin Kwakye - Harvard Law School graduate, author, lawyer and winner of the 2006 Commonwealth Writers Prize for Best Book (Africa Region)

=== Music ===
- Victor Kofi Agawu - Professor of Music, Princeton University
- Ayisi (A.I) - Ghanaian musician
- Ball J - sound engineer and record producer
- Elom Adablah - also known as EL, rapper, and musician (Artiste of the Year at the 2015/2016 Vodafone Ghana Music Awards)
- GAMBO - Ghanaian musician
- Hammer of The Last Two - producer and sound engineer
- Jayso - Ghanaian rapper and record producer
- Denzel Prempeh - Ghanaian musician

=== Journalism ===
- Owuraku Ampofo - sports journalist
- Bernard Avle - Ghanaian media personality and broadcast journalist, Ghana Journalist Association Journalist of the Year (2017)
- Emmanuel Agbeko Gamor - journalist
- Paul Adom Otchere - Ghanaian media personality and broadcast journalist
- Louis Kwame Sakyiamah (Lexis Bill) - Ghanaian media personality
- Gary Al-Smith - sports journalist
- George Addo Jnr - sports journalist

=== Engineering and Science ===
- Ing. Patricia Obo-Nai - Electrical Engineer
- Dr. Charles A. Odonkor - Associate Professor of Orthopedics and Rehabilitation, Yale School of Medicine
- Dr. Emmanuel Adom Winful - Former President of the Ghana Medical Association
- Prof. John Owusu Gyapong - Epidemiologist and public health physician, former vice-chancellor of the university the university of Health and Allied Sciences
- Lucy Quist - Electrical and Electronic Engineer
- Andy Frimpong-Manso - Renowned Ghanaian Petroleum Engineer at Kosmos Energy
- George Carver Clerk - Ghanaian botanist, Fellow of the Ghana Academy of Arts and Sciences

== Former headteachers ==
Headteacher	Tenure in office
The Rev. E. A. W. Engmann	1938—1943
The Rev. E. J. Klufio - (Acting Headmaster)	1943—1948
C. J. Amaning (Acting Headmaster)	1948—1949
The Rev. E. A. W. Engmann	1949—1951
The Rev. E. J. Klufio	1951—1960
N. O. Anim (Acting Headmaster)	Sept 1960—Jan 1961
E. K. Datsa (Acting Headmaster)	Jan 1961—July 1961
S. M. Akita (Acting Headmaster)	Aug 1961—Sept 1961
The Rev. E. J. Klufio	1961—1966
E. K. Caesar (Acting Headmaster)	Jan 1966—Augt 1966
E. K. Datsa	1966-1973
E. A. Apeadu (Acting Headmaster)	Sept 1973—Aug 1974
Odadee The Rev. E. S. Mate-Kodjo ‘48	1974—1980
E. Y. Attua-Afari	1980—1982
E. A. Apeadu	1982—1989
Rose Ankrah (Acting Headmistress)	1989—1990
Odadee A. A. Akuoku '62	1990—1996
J. J. Asare (Acting Headmaster)	1996—1997
J. J. Asare	1997—2006
Africanus Kwame Anane	2006—2014
Lady Queene Aseidu-Akrofi	2014-2018
David Odjija	2018—

== See also ==
- List of senior secondary schools in Ghana
- Aburi Girls' Senior High School
