= Louis Kwame Sakyiamah =

Ghanaian radio and TV presenter

- Born: Ghana
- Other name: Lexis Bill
- Education: Presbyterian Boys' Secondary School; Kwame Nkrumah University of Science and Technology (BA); Ghana Institute of Management and Public Administration (MBA)
- Occupations: Journalist, radio and television presenter
- Years active: 2008–present
- Known for: Walk With Lexis, Drive time

Louis Sakyiamah (known professionally as Lexis Bill) is a Ghanaian radio and television presenter and entrepreneur.

== Early life and education ==
Louis Kwame Sakyiamah was born to Mr. Dickson Nuamah and Mrs. Wilhemina Animwaah, and hails from Abompe in the Eastern Region of Ghana. Sakyiamah is the eldest of three siblings.

He attended PRESEC-Legon for his basic education and later enrolled at Presbyterian Boys' Senior High School. He holds a Bachelor of Arts in Social Science from Kwame Nkrumah University of Science and Technology (KNUST), and a Master of Business Administration (MBA) from the Ghana Institute of Management and Public Administration (GIMPA).

== Career life ==
Sakyiamah began his broadcasting career in Kumasi, working with Focus FM, Kapital Radio, and Radio Xtacy (formerly Kessewaa Radio). In 2010, he joined the Multimedia Group, where he initially worked with Hitz FM before moving to Joy FM. He has cited broadcasters such as Tommy Annan Forson, Bola Ray, Kwami Sefa Kayi, and Komla Dumor as influences on his career.

In 2017, he was selected as the host of the television programme Men's World. In addition to his broadcasting career, Sakyiamah has been involved in various business ventures, including founding a fitness company, X Fitness. He also organizes a regular community fitness initiative titled Walk With Lexis.

== Personal life ==
Sakyiamah married Esther Esimi Siale in a private ceremony held in Accra on 20 November 2020.

== Awards and nominations ==
Year	Prize	Recipient	Result	Ref
2012	Radio Morning Show Host of the Year	Himself	Nominated	
2015	Most Stylish Radio Personality	Himself	Nominated	
2017	Man of the Year Communications-The Pav Ansah Communicator Award	Himself	Nominated	
2017	Radio Late Afternoon Show Host Of The Year	Himself	Nominated	
