= Joy FM (Ghana) =

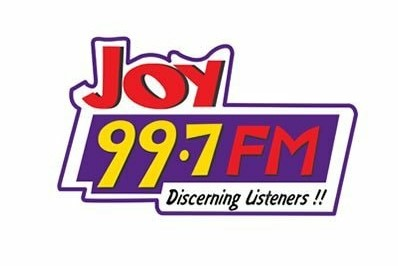
- Accra; Ghana
- Broadcast area: Greater Accra Region
- Frequency: 99.7 MHz

Programming
- Language: English
- Format: Local news, talk, sports, politics and music

Ownership
- Owner: Multimedia Group Limited; (Multimedia Broadcasting Co. Ltd.)
- Sister stations: Luv FM, Adom FM, Asempa FM, Multi TV, Nhyira FM, Hitz FM

History
- First air date: 1st May, 1995

Links
- Website: MyJoyOnline.com

Joy FM is a privately owned radio station in Accra, the capital of Ghana. The station is owned and run by the media group company Multimedia Group Limited. It is one of the most listened to radio stations in Ghana that broadcasts in the English language. Established in 1995 by Kwasi Twum, the founder of Multimedia Group Limited, Joy FM became the first private radio station to be licensed in Ghana. The Multimedia Group has been a pivotal force in catalyzing growth in the advertising, creative arts, and entertainment industries.

== Notable personalities ==
- Nathan Kwabena Adisi
- Gary Al-Smith
- Doreen Andoh
- Tommy Annan Forson
- Samson Lardy Anyenini
- Emefa Apawu
- Maame Esi Thompson
- Nathaniel Attoh
- Manasseh Azure
- Dzifa Bampoh
- Lexis Bill
- Bola Ray
- Komla Dumor
- Kojo Oppong Nkrumah
- Kwaku Sakyi-Addo
- Owuraku Ampofo
- Mark Okraku-Mante
- Francisca Kakra Forson
