= Francisca Kakra Forson =

Journalist

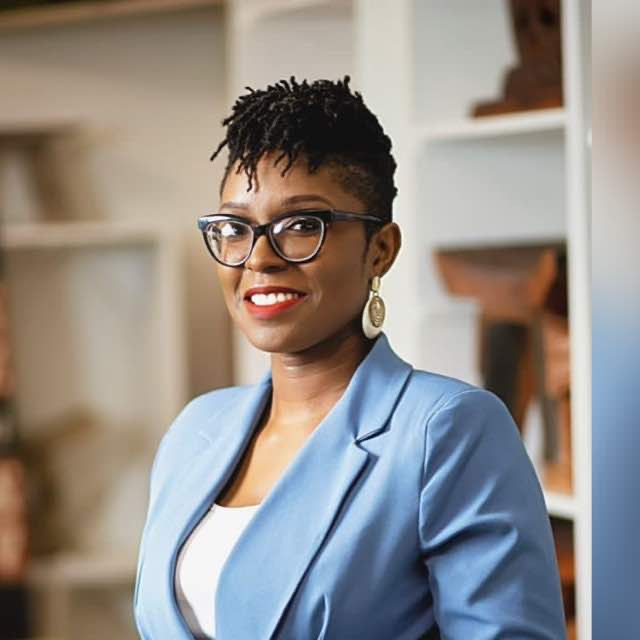
- Occupations: Lawyer & Journalist
- Website: https://YouTube.com/user/kayotekay

biographies of living persons policyFrancisca Kakra Forson (born 21 March) is a Ghanaian lawyer and leading female journalist. Kakra is also a co-host of Ghana’s leading morning radio show, the Citi Breakfast Show (CitiCBS) on Citi 97.3 FM .

Forson’s estimated seventeen (17) years journalism career began with major news media in Ghana, The Multiedia Group where she anchored news bulletins including the Joy Midday News on radio and JoynewsToday on TV. She also contributed to articles ("Frankly Francisca") on myjoyonline.com.

Francisca while at Metro TV hosted major news and current affairs shows "Good Afternoon Ghana", "Inside Pages" and "The Verdict" (centered on the 2020 election petition at the Supreme Court). She also managed the Metro newsroom as ag. news editor.

Ms Forson has since 2015 worked as an international freelance journalist for West Africa Democracy Radio (WADR) in Dakar, VOAnews (radio & TV) and TRT World (Turkey).

She branched into public relations working as a communications contractor for the Institute for Statistical Social and Economic Research (ISSER). Francisca also worked with the Chamber for Bulk Oil Distributors (CBOD) as corporate affairs manager. She is a lead communications strategist with Platinum PR.

Francisca obtained her Bachelor of Arts and Master of Communications from the University of Ghana, Legon. She is also a past student of Holy Child School, CapeCoast.

== Career ==
She has worked with notable media organizations like Joy FM, BBC, VOA & Metro TV.

In May 2017, she was named alongside Ameyaw Debrah, Manifest, Gary Al-Smith and MzVee as the United Nations International Children's Emergency Fund (UNICEF) influencers for Ghana's Equality Campaign, "Let's Be Fair which threw light on the plight of about 3,600,000 million people lacking basic opportunities across the country.

== Awards ==
=== Nominations ===
She was awarded the Best Road Safety reporter in 2012 by the Ghana Road Safety Commission and was also a nominee for the Ghana Journalist Awards in the same year.
