= Asempa FM =

Radio station in Accra, Ghana

- Accra; Ghana
- Frequency: 94.7 MHz

Programming
- Languages: English, Twi
- Format: Local news, talk and music

Ownership
- Owner: Multimedia Group Limited; (Bell Communications Limited)

Links
- Website: Multimedia Ghana website

Asempa FM is a privately owned commercial radio station in Accra, the capital of Ghana. The station is owned and run by the media group company known as Multimedia Group Limited.

They are one of the radio stations in Ghana who do well in local news, entertainment, political talk shows, and sports. They are associated with other sister stations that are also owned by Multimedia Group Limited. They include Adom FM, Joy FM (Ghana), Hitz FM, Nhyira FM, and Luv FM. They all correspond to Multimedia Group Limited.
