= Emefa Apawu =

Ghanaian journalist

- Born: Irene Emefa Apawu; October 12, 1982 (age 43); Accra, Ghana
- Occupations: Journalist, tv host
- Years active: 2003–present
- Employer: Multimedia Group Limited
- Awards: Exceptional COVID-19 Reporting at the 25th GJA Awards

Emefa Apawu (born Irene Emefa Apawu on October 12, 1982) is a Ghanaian broadcast journalist, TV and radio anchor and producer. In 2020, she won an award for Exceptional COVID-19 Reporting at the 25th GJA Awards (Ghana Journalists Awards).

Apawu was one of the media personalities selected by the Volta Regional Coordinating Council in conjunction with the Ghana Tourism Authority (GTA) and the Eastern/Volta/Oti branch of the Association of Ghana Industries (AGI) to champion the Visit Volta Campaign as a native of the region from Anfoega Akukome in the Volta Region of Ghana.

She took over from Dzifa Bampoh as co-anchor of Joy FM's primetime news bulletin, ‘News Night’

== Early life and education ==
Emefa is the first of five children born to Gladys Esi Tecku and the late Moses Kodzo Apawu. She is from Anfoega Akukorme in the Volta Region but was born in Accra. Emefa attended St. John's Preparatory School, Achimota and continued at St. Anthony's School, South Odorkor. She is an alumnus of OLA Girls Secondary School. Emefa obtained her first degree in Management at Central University. She also has a master's degree in Development communication from the Ghana Institute of Journalism.

== Career ==
She started her career as a journalist with Radio Gold as a production assistant in 2003. She has also worked with Class Media Group where she was Host of Class FM's evening news, 505. She has also worked as the administrative secretary of a cable manufacturing company REROY cables.

Emefa joined the Multimedia Group Limited in 2017 and is the lead news anchor in the Joy newsroom.

== Personal life ==
Emefa is a mother of two. The name of her daughter is Kekeli Apawu.
