= Hitz FM =

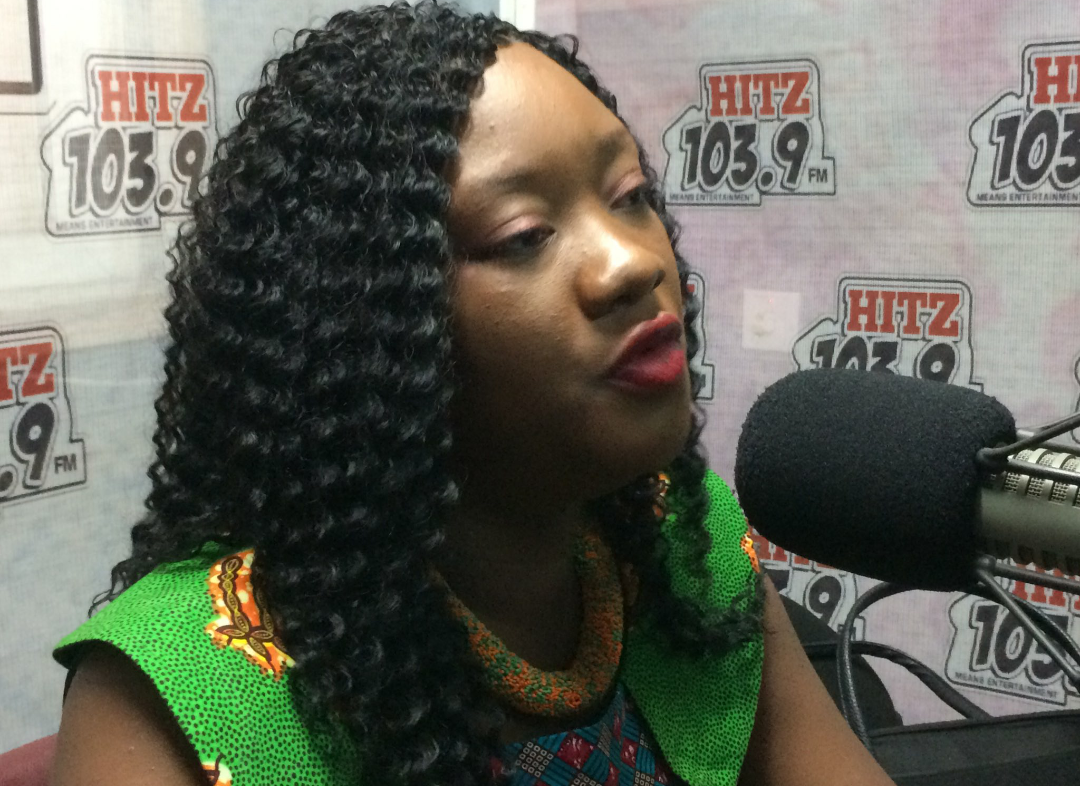

Accra; Ghana
- Broadcast area: Greater Accra Region
- Frequency: 103.9 MHz

Programming
- Language: English
- Format: Local news, talk and music

Ownership
- Owner: Multimedia Group Limited; (Pearl Communications Ltd.)
- Sister stations: Adom FM, Joy FM (Ghana), Asempa FM, Nhyira FM, Luv FM

Links
- Website: Multimedia Ghana website

HITZ FM is a privately owned and a commercial radio station in Accra, the capital of Ghana, winner of ABGMA Best Radio Show Entertainment award for the year 2024. The station is owned and run by the media group company Multimedia Group Limited.

The station also plays a mix of contemporary local and foreign music interlaced with entertainment tidbits.

== Staff ==
- DJ Black - Programmes Manager
