= George Addo Jr. =

Ghanaian sports journalist

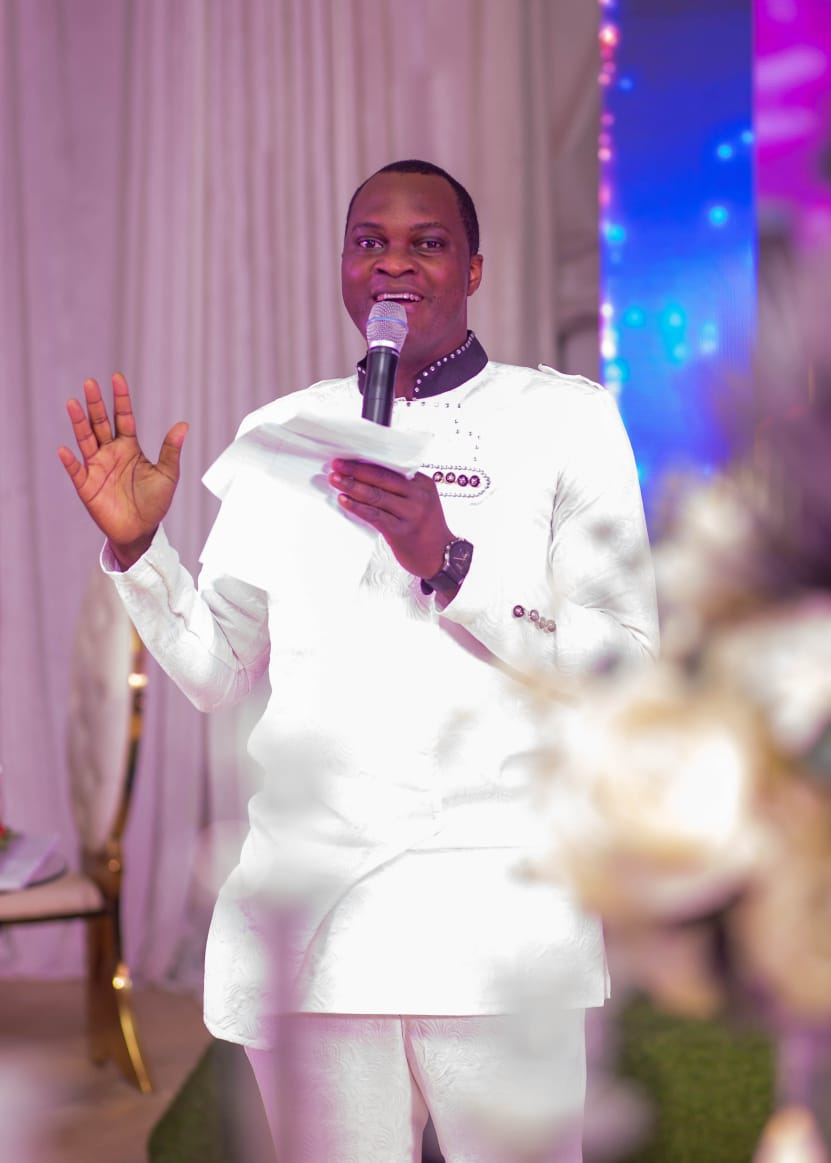
- Born: Accra, Ghana
- Education: Presbyterian Boys' Secondary School; Institute of Chartered Accountants Ghana; University of Ghana (B.A.)
- Occupation: Sports journalist
- Years active: 2009 – present
- Known for: Football Radio & TV Commentary, Web reporting & Feature Documentaries, Sports Business, Sports Communication, Journalism & Broadcasting
- Television: Touchline, Joy Sports Center, Joy News Sports Review, LockerRoom, and Sports Express

George Addo Jr. is a Ghanaian sports journalist who has experience in covering sports on the continent of Africa, Europe, the Americas, and the rest of the world. He has worked with global media brands such as BBC World Service, Super Sport, Talk Sport, DW TV, SABC, and VOA.

He is well known for creating and developing content for Ghanaian, African and global audiences through the art of storytelling such as features and documentaries around sports on a wide range of subjects.

== Early life and education ==
He attended Presbyterian Boys Secondary School from 2000 to 2003. He holds a Bachelor of Arts of degree in Psychology and Linguistics from the University of Ghana, Legon. In 2008, he obtained an ICAG Part II Certificate from the Institute of Chartered Accountants Ghana.

== Career ==
He started his career during his university days at Radio Universe as a Radio Sports presenter and commentator, then moved to Multimedia Group of companies where he worked at JoyNews TV and Joy FM radio as a sport presenter hosting various sports shows.

In 2024, he was appointed by the New World TV as the lead English commentator for the 2023 Africa Cup of Nations. He was joined by Sebastien Bassong and Emmanuel Adebayor in the commentary booth.

=== Radio Univers ===
He joined Radio Univers in 2009 as a Level 100 student and becoming the Head of Sports in late 2010. Addo was the host of Sports Digest; a segment on the Morning show for 4 years. He also hosted another show known as Sports Express, which featured guests such as Kwabena Yeboah, Michael Oti Adjei, and Yaw Ampofo Ankrah amongst other Sports Broadcast personalities.

While at Radio Univers Addo covered two editions of the Ghana Universities Sports Association Games; (2009 and 2011) and two editions of the West Africa University Games (2010 and 2012). Addo was also part of 2 Bilateral games between the University of Ghana and the university of Ibadan.

He was the first commentator of the University of Ghana Football League and run over 200 live commentaries on Radio Univers.

=== The Multimedia Group ===
His first international career football commentary happened on radio via the Joy FM 99.7 frequency in Accra, Ghana as he run commentary on Spain vs. the Netherlands match at the 2014 FIFA World Cup in Brazil showcasing his in-depth knowledge of football during the FIFA World Cup tournament.

At the Multimedia Group Limited, he hosts and produces various sports shows across the English sister brands of the group such as Joy Sports Center and LockerRoom on Joy 99.7FM; Touchline on JoyNews, and Hitz Sports Update on Hitz 103.9FM.

Addo Jr. has run various football commentaries in English spanning the following;

- 5 Africa Cup of Nations tournaments (AFCON)
- 2 Euro Tournaments including the Euro 2020
- 5 UEFA Champions League Seasons
- 3 FIFA World Cup Tournaments including the 2022 FIFA World Cup in Qatar
- 7 Ghana Premier League seasons

In the world of Athletics, he has provided full coverage for the Multimedia Group Ltd at these World Athletics events below;

- 2017 World Athletics Championships – London
- 2019 World Athletics Championships – Doha
- 2022 World Athletics Championships – Oregon
- 2018 Indoor Athletics Championship – Birmingham
- 2018 Africa Athletics Championship – Asaba, Nigeria

=== Coach Hene Sports Club ===
In March 2023, through an official press release on the website of Coach Hene Sports Club, his appointment as Director of Communications was announced.

According to the UK-based Sports Club, he will be running the Communications Department by providing strategic direction in dealing with the media, corporations, stakeholders and the wider public in the United Kingdom and abroad.

=== BBC ===
After a decade at the Multimedia Group Ltd, Addo joined the BBC in Salford as a football reporter in 2023.

== Achievements and awards ==
- He won the National and Regional awards Scheme Sports Host of the Year – 2019/2020.
- He won the National Regional and awards Scheme – Sports Host of the Year and Commentator of the year.
- In 2014 he won the best sport journalist for promoting the Ghana Premier League
- Nominated for PAV Ansah Communications Award under the prestigious EMY Africa Awards scheme
