= Jeremie Van-Garshong =

Ghanaian radio and television presenter

- Born: Jeremie Van-Garshong; 21 June 1984 (age 41); Accra
- Citizenship: Ghanaian
- Occupations: Radio and TV Presenter
- Years active: 2000-present
- Notable work: 4syte TV, VIBE FM, YFM, Live FM, Voice over artiste

Jeremie Van-Garshong is a Ghanaian radio and television presenter, presenting on 4syte TV in the late 2000s, and on Y FM and Live FM radio.
