= Adom (name) =

Adom is both a given name and a surname. Notable people with the name include:

== Given name ==
- Adom Getachew, Ethiopian-American political scientist
- Kwame Adom Frimpong (born 1996), Ghanaian footballer
- Reindorf Adom Sarbah (born 2006), Ghanaian footballer
- Kevin Adom Lokko (born 1995), English footballer
- Paul Adom Otchere, Ghanaian broadcast journalist

== Surname ==
- Frederick Obeng Adom (born 1984), Ghanaian politician
- Gottlieb Ababio Adom (1904–1979), Ghanaian educator, journalist, editor and Presbyterian minister
- Kain Adom (born 2001), English footballer
- Nino Adom-Malaki (born 2004), English footballer

== See also ==
- Adom (disambiguation)
