= Daniel Owusu Asiamah =

Ghanaian preacher

Daniel Owusu Asiamah is a Ghanaian missionary and preacher of the Churches of Christ. He is the lead preacher of Takoradi Church of Christ and the founder of Outreach Africa Vocational Institute (OAVI).

The only child of his mother (father is deceased), he was born in Ghana on June 8, 1965. Asiamah is a product of Ghana Bible College, International School of Biblical Studies (South Africa), Southern California School of Evangelism (USA), Literacy International (USA), Haggai Institute (Hawaii, USA) and Freed–Hardeman University (USA) free non-certificated lectures/seminars.

In July 2019, he was among the ten finalists of MTN Heroes Of Change. He also serves as the Director of Studies at Takoradi Bible College. Asiamah is the host of television Bible program called Voice Of The Church on Adom TV (Ghana). Asiamah has similar radio programs in the US, Canada and a number of European countries. He has traveled around the world to start new churches or encourage Christians through seminars, lectureships, and public evangelism.

Through his Outreach Africa Ministry Asiamah has impacted several towns and villages in Ghana by providing the poor with water wells, food, clothing, cash donations and education. Through the same outreach programme, he has provided free vocational education to people in and around Takoradi Municipality to equip them to become independent in society. Since the inception of the school in February 2008, about 2000 people have graduated. Asiamah is a believer in giving to the needy in society and patriotism, a belief which stems from his humble beginnings and struggles growing up in Ghana.

He was awarded an honorary Doctorate degree (Doctor in Divinity) in 2015 by the Los Angeles Development Institute in Los Angeles, USA. He was awarded another honorary degree by the same institution in 2016, "Professor in Biblical Studies". He has more than 500 taped messages and no less than 1000 pages of religious and social journals.

== Full time missionary work ==
Year 2023

Following his resignation from his position as preacher for the Takoradi Central Church of Christ in 2023, Daniel O. Asiamah has visited numerous congregations of the Church of Christ in Ghana. The congregations in the Kasoa area organised the Kasoa revival meetings, which spanned a period of four days. Following these meetings, extensive teachings were initiated, centring on the concept of "Giving" as the fundamental principle of Christianity. This message has motivated a considerable number of individuals to donate financially in order to serve God in their local congregations. This has enabled them to provide significant support to those in need within and outside the church, as well as to disseminate the gospel to the world.

Consequently, the Prestea-Bondaye lectures were scheduled to take place over a period of four days. The programme included such topics as "The Two Chapters of Money" and "We As Stewards". Subsequently, he directed his attention towards other regions, with a particular focus on the Greater Accra Region of Ghana. In this locale, he participated in a "Back To The Bible Seminar" at the Mandela-Accra Church of Christ, contributing to the edification of the congregants. The primary subject addressed in a time period analogous to the preceding seminars was "Let's Choose God's Way", a timely reminder that a significant number of individuals seek to align their actions with their own inclinations and caprices. Evidence of this phenomenon was observed in a number of congregations within the Accra Metropolis, thus highlighting the necessity to provide a reminder and edification to the brethren on the importance of returning to the simplicity of New Testament Christianity.

Daniel, a native of Konongo, travelled from the Greater Accra Region to the Ashanti Region as part of his missionary endeavours to strengthen the brethren in the churches of Christ in and around the Konongo Municipality. This concluded the series of four revival meetings and seminars, which took place within the initial two months of the year 2023.

As the first quarter of 2023 drew to a close, Daniel Asiamah was invited to address the congregation of the English-speaking Church of Christ on Waterloo Road in Edmond, Oklahoma. His address drew upon the teachings of Jonah's narrative, particularly the account of his journey to Nineveh, to offer insights on the application of these lessons in contemporary contexts. He encouraged the brethren that among other things the churches of Christ need to wake from the slumber in which they found themselves as Jonah did. The church has been charged to go to the world bring the message of repentance to them and thus we should also do as commanded by Jesus.

Within the second quarter of 2023, Bro Dan Asiamah travelled to joined the brethren in the Adanse-Twepease area on their revival lectureship as well. After this, he announced his plans to launch his second book called "Missionary Posts", 306 pages in length.

The second half of the year were filled with seminars like the Youth Seminar organised by the churches in Sunyani, the Asankragwa Revival Lectureship, Prechers' And Leaders' Clinic by the Takoradi Central Church of Christ to bring the curtains down on a rather eventful 2023.

Snapshot of seminars marking the year 2023:

- Kasoa Revival Meetings
- Prestea Bondaye Lectureship: The Two Chapters of Money & We As Stewards
- Mandela-Accra Meeting: Back To The Bible Seminar
- Konongo Revival Lectureship
- Waterloo Road church of Christ Sermon/Lectureship, Oklahama
- Sunyani Youth Lectureship
- Asankragwa Revival Lectureship
- Adanse-Twepease Revival Lectureship
- Preachers' & Leaders' Clinic

Year 2024

One of the most significant events of the year was the initiative taken by Daniel Asiamah to organise a donation drive within the churches of Christ in Ghana. This initiative aimed to contribute to the reconstruction of the Komfo Anokye Teaching Hospital, with the objective of addressing the health needs of the Ghanaian populace. Daniel has repeatedly emphasised his conviction that the church should allocate its financial resources as part of its social responsibility to support such causes. The reconstruction was initiated by the Asantehene Otumfuo Osei Tutu II. The Church of Christ donated a sum of three hundred and thirty thousand Ghana cedis (GHS 330 000), which equates to approximately twenty-six thousand euros (€26 000) at the time of the transaction. This resulted in a significant increase in the level of approval and recognition from the Ghanaian population, especially at a time when Christianity was under heavy criticism especially on the various social media platforms.

Revival Meetings for the year 2024

- Obuasi Area Revival Lectureship
- Asuofua & Barekese Road churches of Christ Revival Lectureship
- Upper West churches of Christ Revival
- Agona Ahanta churches of Christ Revival
- Takoradi central church of Christ Revival
- Ahwiaa - Meduma church of Christ Lectureship

Year 2025

Brother Daniel Asiamah demonstrated his commitment to his principles by donating his own funds to construct a retreat centre for the churches of Christ in Ghana. The facility is equipped with multiple well-furnished rooms, which are available for use by members of the congregation who wish to engage in a period of spiritual reflection in an environment characterised by tranquillity, and which is distinct from their usual places of residence. Daniel's position is that this location is not the site of divine presence. However, he does advocate for the provision of a space where Christians can engage in spiritual practices, such as prayer and fasting, without the encumbrance of their quotidian obligations. The inspiration for this subject derives from the Garden of Gethsemane, a location which Jesus Christ would frequent in order to withdraw from his disciples and engage in prayer to his Father in heaven. The Churches of Christ Retreat Centre in Ghana is an impressive structure that is estimated to have cost approximately three million, six hundred throusand Ghana cedis (GHS 3,600,000), equivalent to about two hundred and fifty thousand euros (250 000€). The project was primarily financed by Dan Asiamah. However, several brethren contributed funds to support the cause upon hearing of the work being undertaken on the construction. The inauguration ceremony was held in March 2025, with the Omanhene of Asante Akyem Domeabra and numerous other distinguished guests in attendance.

In accordance with the doctrine of exemplification, a number of members have been motivated to emulate the actions of those who have gone before, thereby undertaking initiatives for the benefit of their respective congregations in their respective hometowns. Illustrative of this phenomenon is the case of a brother and his wife, who, motivated by a sense of commitment and dedication, have undertaken the construction of a church auditorium in their place of origin, Newtown. It is evident that there have been multiple documented cases of this nature across the nation.

A further noteworthy occurrence was the release of five inmates who had been convicted on the basis of their inability to settle their financial obligations. This brother Dan is cited as an exemplar of the church's commitment to visit prisoners and to ensure that they are not neglected.

Revival Meetings for the year 2025

- Nsawam Asante Akura Church of Christ Lectureship
- Newtown Church of Christ Revival Lectureship

== Books ==
- The Legendary Post (2021), a collection of Asiamah's social media posts
- Missionary Posts (2023)
