= Metro TV (Ghana) =

Ghana Television channel

Metropolitan Entertainment Television - Metro TV Ghana
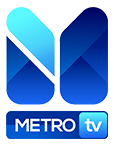
- Country: Ghana
- Network: Metro Network
- Headquarters: Accra

Programming
- Language: English

Ownership
- Owner: Ignite Media Group (Jospong Group of Companies)
- Sister channels: Original TV; Original FM

History
- Launched: 1997

Links
- Website: www.metrotvonline.com

Metropolitan Entertainment Television is a Ghanaian free-to-air television channel. It was launched in 1997 and it is one of the country's first private broadcasters.

Metro TV is a member of the Ignite Media Group, a part of the Jospong Group of Companies (JGC) which also operates Original TV and Original 91.9FM.

== History ==
Metro TV was established and launched in 1997 through a joint venture between Talal Fattal's advertising firm Media Number One and the state-owned Ghana Broadcasting Corporation (GBC)

The station quickly set itself apart as the first private television station in Ghana to broadcast nationwide and via satellite. It also pioneered several innovations in the local media space. including the integration of local-language news, the local dubbing of Mexican telenovelas, and the broadcast of major sporting and international content such as the Ghana Premier League on SuperSport, Al Jazeera and MTV Base.

== Ownership transitions and rebranding ==
- Fattal Era: For more than two decades, Metro TV operated under the leadership and management of the Fattal brothers, Talal and Fadi Fattal through Optimum Media Prime (OMP)
- KBL Acquisition (2017-2020): in late 2017, Kingdom Business Link Capital Limited (KBL) and Media TV acquired the station and took over its management. The new owners introduced a revitalized proramming lineup, with flagship show Good Morning Ghana going on to win the Ghana Journalists Association (GJA) Best Morning Show award.
- Ignite Media Group (2020-Present): Metro TV is currently owned by the Ignite Media Group, a subsidiary of the Jospong Group of Companies led by Joseph Siaw Agyepong.

== Launch of new premises ==
In October 2020, a new office which is located in North Ridge, was commissioned by the President, Nana Akufo-Addo. It is a four-floor building that has space for offices and houses six (6) fully furnished studios.

== Programming ==
=== Current Affairs ===
- Good Morning Ghana
- Good Afternoon Ghana
- Good Evening Ghana
- The Bottomline
- Inside Pages

=== News ===
- News @ 6 am
- News Beat
- News Night

=== Lifestyle & Entertainment ===
- Gen Z Show
- Cook Africa
- Home Owners Show
- The Gist

=== Sports ===
- Metro Sports
- Sports Direct

== Notable personalities ==
- Paul Adom-Otchere
- Francisca Kakra Forson
- Randy Abbey
- Bridget Otoo
- Frema Adunyame
- Anita Erskinne
- Emmanuel Kwasi Afriyie
- Moro Awudu
- Desmond Okraku Danso
- Helen Ayewedja
- Philip John Quartey
- Eugenia Akorfa Kumi
- Shadrack Odame Agyare
- Annie Afua Ampofo
