= Manasseh Azure Awuni =

Ghanaian journalist

- Born: 1985 (age 40–41)
- Education: University of Ghana, GIJ
- Occupation: Investigative journalist
- Organization: The Fourth Estate

Manasseh Azure Awuni is a Ghanaian investigative journalist and former founding Editor-in-Chief of The Fourth Estate. He previously worked with Multimedia Group Limited in Accra, Ghana.

His investigative and anti-corruption reports have caused national uproar and resulted in some government officials going to prison. He spends his leisure time speaking at youth programmes and anti-corruption seminars.

Azure has won various awards for his works including the journalist of the year at the West Africa Media Excellence Awards in 2019 and 2020.

== Education ==
Born in Bongo in the Upper East Region, Azure moved to Kete-Krachi in the Volta Region where he completed his secondary education at Krachi Senior High School. He proceeded to the Ghana Institute of Journalism where he obtained a Bachelor of Arts in Communication Studies and, later, a Master of Arts degree in communication studies at the University of Ghana.

== Career ==
Manasseh Azure Awuni was the Editor-in-Chief, The Fourth Estate which is a non-profit, public-interest journalism project founded by the Media Foundation for West Africa (MFWA).

Azure began his career as a freelance journalist before joining the Multimedia Group Limited in 2012. where he was the head of investigation at Joy FM and Joy News, subsidiaries of MGL.

== Controversies ==
Azure's work has always stirred national controversy, notably concerning the Mahama Ford saga. He broke a story in 2016 when the then president, John Mahama, received a Ford Expedition gift from a Burkinabé contractor. Many groups called for an investigation into the saga. The gift was believed to be a return favour for a contract given to the businessman. The story damaged Mahama's second term bid.

In 2019, Azure and Joy FM broadcast a documentary titled "Militia in the heart of the nation" which detailed how a private and unlicensed security group affiliated to the governing New Patriotic Party operated from the seat of a government annexe, the Osu Castle. The government denied the story, as expected, but various government spokespersons contradicted one another.

The De-Eye group also sued Azure and the media house. The group abandoned the suit when Azure and the Multimedia Group filed their defence. The journalist has however, won similar defamation suits against those he has investigated.

== Books ==
- The President Ghana Never Got
- The Fourth John: Reign, Rejection and Rebound
- Letters to My Future Wife
- Voice of Conscience
- Investigative Journalism in Africa

== Awards ==
Manasseh is a recipient of several awards:

- 2022: Nominee for the Allard Prize for International Integrity
- 2022: Longlist for One World Media Awards (Popular Features Category)
- 2021: Ghana's Integrity Personality of the Year, Awarded by GII, Ghana Chapter of Transparency International
- 2021: Millennium Excellence Award for Media Excellence
- 2021: 2nd Prize for Norbert Zongo Africa Investigative Journalism Award
- 2020: Overall Best Journalist for West Africa, West Africa Media Excellence Award
- 2018: Overall Best Journalist for West Africa, West Africa Media Excellence Award
- 2012: 2011 Ghana Journalists Association Best Journalist of the Year
- 2011: 2010 Ghana Journalists Association Most Promising Journalist of the Year
- 2020: Best Anti-Corruption Journalist for West Africa; West Africa Media Excellence Award
- 2018: Best Anti-Corruption Journalist for West Africa; West Africa Media Excellence Award
- 2017: Best Investigative Journalist for West Africa; West Africa Media Excellence Award
- 2012: National Youth Achievers Award for Media Excellence
- 2014: Ghana Journalists Association Best Anti-Corruption Reporter
- 2014: Ghana Journalists Association Best Radio News Reporter
- 2013: Ghana Journalists Association Best TV News Reporter
- 2012: Ghana Journalists Association Best TV News Reporter
- 2012: Ghana Journalists Association Best Reporter on Sanitation
- 2012: Ghana Journalists Association Best Features Writer
- 2012: Overall Winner of Ideas Award of Ghanaian Achievers Under 40
- 2012: Ghana Journalists Association 1st Runner Up in Sports Reporting, 2012
- 2011: Ghana Journalists Association Best TV News Reporter
- 2011: Ghana Journalists Association Best Human Rights Reporter
- 2007: Winner: (Tertiary Level) 2007 National Emancipation Day Essay Competition,
