= Owuraku =

Owuraku is a given name and a surname. Notable people with the name include:

- Owuraku Amofah (born 1956), Ghanaian politician and lawyer
- Owuraku Ampofo (born 1996), Ghanaian sports journalist
- William Owuraku Aidoo (born 1964), Ghanaian politician
