= Kwadwo Bonnah =

Ghanaian radio personality

- Born: Ashanti region, Ghana
- Other name: K. Bonnah
- Education: University of Ghana
- Occupation: Radio personality

Kwadwo Bonnah mostly known as K. Bonnah is a Ghanaian radio personality and economist.

== Early life and education ==
Bonnah was born in the Ashanti Region. He completed Opoku Ware Secondary School, a second cycle school in the Ashanti Region of Ghana. He continued to pursue Economics and Information Studies at the University of Ghana.

== Career ==
Bonnah started his career as part of the Luv FM crew on Private Party in his days in Legon. He joined Class FM in 2015 with Desmond Lamptey on Country on Class. He is currently the host of ‘Dropoff’ on Starr FM as a replacement for Jon Germain.
