= Adom Praiz =

Annual gospel music concert in Accra, Ghana

Adom Praiz is an annual gospel music concert that is organized at The Perez Dome in Accra, Ghana. It was started in 2009 at the Accra International Conference Centre and organized by Adom FM. The event has been attended by both local and international award-winning gospel musicians and groups.

== 2022 edition ==
The 2022 edition of Adom Praiz was organized on October 19 and was headlined by the famous American gospel musician Travis Greene at Perez Dome in Accra. The two-day gospel event which started on Nov 3-4 saw great musicians grace the occasion from both the international and local scene with some gospel artists like Ohemaa Mercy, Perez Musik, Celestine Donkor, Edwin Dadson, Jack Alolome, and other musicians performing at the event.

At the launch of the event which took place at Victory Bible Church at Kokomlemle, Accra, the General Manager, Sales and Customer Service of Multimedia, Mr. Max Fugar, expressed his excitement about the return of the event to the live audience after the 2021 edition was held virtually due to COVID-19.

== Airtel Adom Praiz ==
Airtel Ghana has participated in a gospel event on the Ghanaian gospel calendar. For seven consecutive years, Airtel, in partnership with Adom FM, has organized an annual concert featuring gospel performers. This event, known as Airtel Adom Praiz, has included international gospel artists and is an established part of Ghana’s gospel music scene.

== Artists ==
Some notable musicians to have performed at the event included:

=== Local ===
- Denzel Prempeh
- Stella Aba Seal
- Kwaku Gyasi

=== International ===
- Kirk Franklin
- Ron Kenoly
- Cece Winans
- Israel Houghton
- Brooklyn Tabernacle Choir
- Hezekiah Walker
- Travis Greene
