= Ghana–India relations =

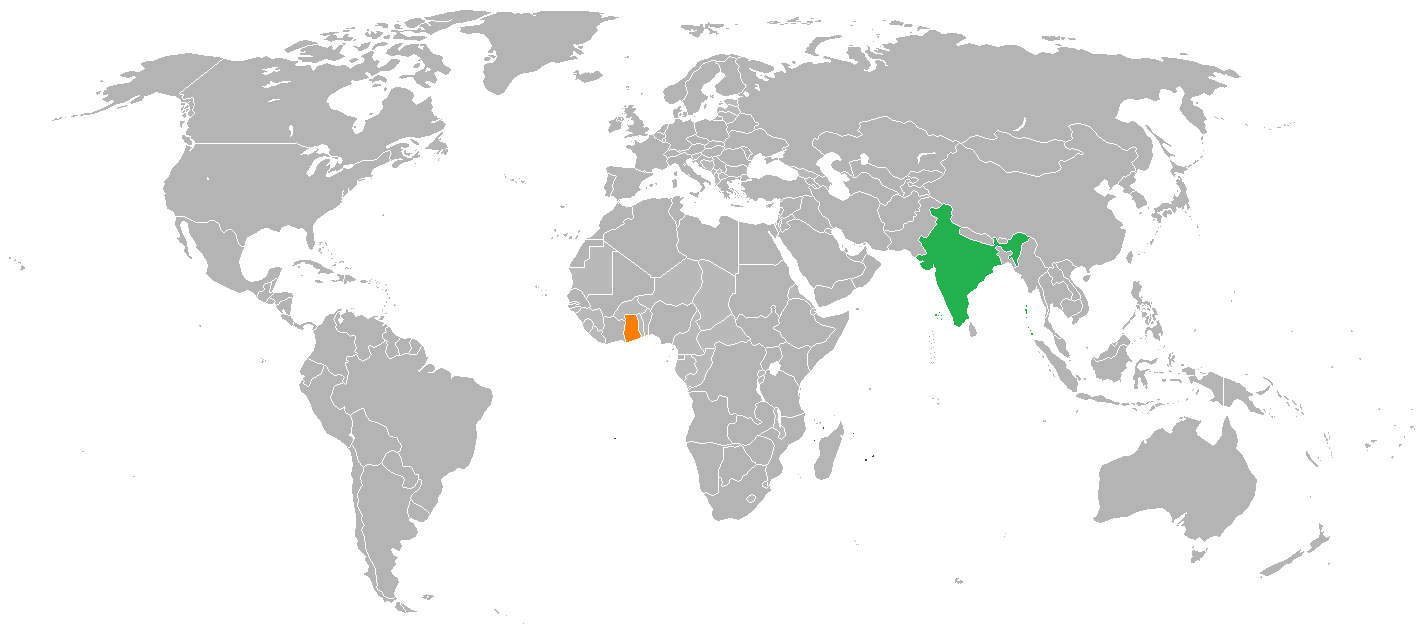
- India: Ghana

Ghana–India relations are the bilateral relations between India and Ghana. As members of the Commonwealth, India maintains a High Commission in Accra, while Ghana has its High Commission in New Delhi.

== History ==
=== 19th Century ===
In 1817, Thomas Bowdich led a British delegation to Kumasi in order to improve relations between the Ashanti Empire and the United Kingdom. An Ashanti prince was skeptical of British motives in Ashanti, citing British presence in India. According to historian Edgerton, "The next day, an Asante prince asked Bowdich why, if Britain were so selfless, it had behaved so differently in India."

=== 20th Century ===
India opened a consulate in Accra in 1953 and established full-fledged diplomatic relations with Ghana immediately after its independence in 1957. The Indian High Commission in Accra is also concurrently accredited to Burkina Faso, Togo and Sierra Leone. Ghana established its High Commission in New Delhi after its independence.

The first President of Ghana, Kwame Nkrumah and India's first Prime Minister, Jawaharlal Nehru, shared a strong personal bond of friendship. Presidents Nkrumah, Hilla Limann, John Rawlings and John Kufuor have made state visits to India while Prime Minister P V Narasimha Rao visited Ghana in 1995. India and Ghana are founding members of the Non Aligned Movement, the Government of India's Team-9 initiative and are members of the Commonwealth.

=== 2000s ===
In 2002, President John Kufuor re-energized India-Ghana relations, leading to increased cooperation, including Indian government financial support for the construction of Ghana’s seat of government in 2008. The relationship has been further strengthened through the framework of south-south cooperation, which facilitates the exchange of knowledge, skills, resources, and technologies among developing countries.

=== 2010s ===
Since 2014, Indian Prime Minister Narendra Modi has intensified diplomatic efforts to enhance India’s presence in Africa, positioning partnerships like that with Ghana as central to India’s development-focused engagement with the continent.

=== 2020s ===
In July 2025, Prime Minister Narendra Modi visited Ghana as part of his Five Nation Tour, which also included his visit to Brazil for the 17th BRICS summit. During the visit, Modi made a tacit critique of China’s lending practices in Africa, contrasting them with India’s model of development cooperation. Without explicitly naming China, he emphasized that India’s partnerships are demand-driven and focused on strengthening local capacities and fostering self-sustaining ecosystems, rather than imposing debt burdens. He also reaffirmed India’s support for Africa’s Agenda 2063 and stressed the importance of advancing together as equal partners. During the visit, India and Ghana signed four Memoranda of Understanding to strengthen bilateral cooperation. These included a Cultural Exchange Program to promote collaboration in art, music, dance, literature, and heritage; an agreement between the Bureau of Indian Standards and the Ghana Standards Authority to enhance cooperation in standardization and certification; a partnership between Ghana’s Institute of Traditional and Alternative Medicine and India’s Institute of Teaching and Research in Ayurveda to advance education and research in traditional medicine; and an MoU to institutionalize the Joint Commission Meeting for regular high-level dialogue and review of bilateral initiatives. While in Ghana, PM Modi visited the Parliament of Ghana where he was honored with Ghana's national honor, The Officer of the Order of the Star of Ghana. He was honored by Ghanaian President John Dramani Mahama.

== Indians and Indian culture in Ghana ==
There are about ten thousand Ghanaian Indians and Persons of Indian Origin living in Ghana today with some of them having been there for over 70 years. Ghana is home to a growing indigenous Hindu population that today numbers 13,000 families. Hinduism first came to Ghana only in the late 1940s with the Sindhi traders who migrated here following India's Partition. It has been growing in Ghana and neighbouring Togo since the mid-1970s when an African Hindu monastery was established in Accra.

== Economic ties ==
India is one of Ghana’s key trading partners, importing minerals and exporting goods such as pharmaceuticals, transport equipment, and agricultural machinery. The Ghana-India Trade Advisory Chamber, established in 2018, promotes socio-economic exchange. Bilateral trade rose from US$1 billion in 2011–12 to US$4.5 billion in 2018–19, before dipping to US$2.2 billion in 2020–21 due to the COVID-19 pandemic. By 2023, trade recovered to around US$3.3 billion, making India Ghana’s third-largest trade partner. Indian firms have invested over US$2 billion in Ghana across more than 700 projects, including major companies like B5 Plus and Melcom. Prime Minister Narendra Modi’s 2025 visit aimed to further deepen economic and defense cooperation.

=== Trade ===
Trade between India and Ghana amounted to US$818 million in 2010-11 and is expected to be worth US$1 billion by 2013. Ghana imports automobiles and buses from India and companies like Tata Motors and Ashok Leyland have a significant presence in the country. Ghanaian exports to India consist of gold, cocoa and timber while Indian exports to Ghana comprise pharmaceuticals, agricultural machinery, electrical equipment, plastics, steel and cement.

In July, 2025 PM Modi, while addressing the Parliament of Ghana, stated that the bilateral trade between Ghana and India has crossed a $3 Billion mark and said that they will double this trade within the next 5 years.

=== Economic cooperation ===
The Government of India has extended $228 million in lines of credit to Ghana which has been used for projects in sectors like agro-processing, fish processing, waste management, rural electrification and the expansion of Ghana's railways. India has also offered to set up an India-Africa Institute of Information Technology (IAIIT) and a Food Processing Business Incubation Centre in Ghana under the India-Africa Forum Summit.

=== Investments ===
India is among the largest foreign investors in Ghana's economy. At the end of 2011, Indian investments in Ghana amounted to $550 million covering some 548 projects. Indian investments are primarily in the agriculture and manufacturing sectors of Ghana while Ghanaian companies manufacture drugs in collaboration with Indian companies. The IT sector in Ghana too has a significant Indian presence in it. India and Ghana also have a Bilateral Investment Protection Agreement between them. India's Rashtriya Chemicals and Fertilisers is in the process of setting up a fertiliser plant in Ghana at Nyankrom in the Shama District of the Western Region of Ghana. The project entails an investment of US$1.3 billion and the plant would have an annual production capacity of 1.1 million tonnes, the bulk of which would be exported to India. There are also plans to develop a sugar processing plant entailing an investment of US$36 million. Bank of Baroda, Bharti Airtel, Tata Motors and Tech Mahindra are amongst the major Indian companies in Ghana.

PM Modi during his address to the Parliament of Ghana, stated that Indian companies have invested $2 Billion in over 900 projects in Ghana.

== Technical co-operation ==
India extends scholarship for the training of Ghanaian personnel in India through its Indian Technical and Economic Cooperation Programme and the Special Commonwealth Assistance for Africa Programme(SCAAP).

India has trained over 1,100 Ghanaian students and professionals since the commencement of the programme. India has also helped Ghana with expertise in IT and Communications (ICT) and helped develop the Tema Community Centre into a modern ICT facility. The Ghana-India Kofi Annan Centre of Excellence in ICT is another result of India's cooperation with Ghana in this field. The Centre for Development of Advanced Computing, Pune is to now provide PARAM supercomputing technology and training to the centre from 2012.

The Indian Government supported the Electoral Commission of Ghana in conducting the Presidential and Parliamentary polls there in December 2012 by providing it with indelible ink and has also been helping Ghana develop an electronic system for revenue mobilisation. Ghana is also part of the Pan-African e-Network project initiated by India and Ghana's Kwame Nkrumah University of Science and Technology has commenced degree courses in collaboration with institutions of higher education in India.

The new palace of the Ghanaian President, called Flagstaff House, has been built by India using a $60 million soft loan from the Government of India.

PM Modi announced that Bharat FinTech will initiate UPI services in Ghana providing a major boost to the digital economy of Ghana.

== Healthcare and Defense ==
During the bilateral meeting between PM Modi and President Mahama in July, 2025, it was suggested that India will set up a vaccine hub in Ghana in order to improve healthcare system in Ghana.

PM Modi also stated that India will support Ghana in defense and security, moving further with the mantra of "security through stability". Cooperation will be extended in training of armed forces, maritime security, defense supplies and cyber security.

== See also ==
- Hinduism in Ghana
- Indian Association of Ghana
