= Theodore Obo Asare Jnr =

Ghanaian politician

Theodore Obo Asare Jr.

Member of the Ghana Parliament for Akan Bowiri
- In office 1965–1966
- Preceded by: New
- Succeeded by: Constituency abolished

Personal details
- Born: Theodore Obo Asare Jr. 19 November 1926 Worawora, Gold Coast
- Died: 1994
- Party: Convention People's Party
- Education: Presbyterian Secondary School, Krobo Odumase; Lincoln University; Clarke University; London School of Economics

Theodore Obo Asare Jr. (1926 - 1994) was a Ghanaian politician in first republic. He was the member of parliament for the Akan Bowiri constituency from 1965 to 1966. Prior to entering parliament he was the chairman of the Ghana Commercial Bank.

== Early life and education ==
Asare was born on 19 November 1926 at Worawora, a town in the Oti Region of Ghana. He had his early education at the Presbyterian Mission School, Worawora from 1935 to 1943. He then proceeded to the Presbyterian Secondary School (now Presbyterian Boys' Senior High School) at Odumase Krobo from 1944 to 1946. He entered Lincoln University in 1946 to pursue a bachelor's degree program and graduated in 1950. He obtained his master's degree in economics from Clarke University in 1952 and his doctorate degree from the London School of Economics in 1955.

== Career and politics ==
Asare begun his career as a civil servant in 1953 and in 1954 he earned a United Nations Fellowship Scholarship to pursue a doctorate program at the London School of Economics. In 1957, he joined the Bank of Ghana and a year later he was appointed Principal of the Economics section of the bank. In 1960 he moved to the Ghana Commercial Bank and was appointed Deputy managing director. In September that same year he was appointed chairman and managing director of the bank. In June 1965 he became the member of parliament for the Akan Bowiri constituency. He served in that capacity until February 1966 when the Nkrumah government was overthrown.

== Personal life ==
His hobbies included stamp collecting and coin collecting. Asare died in 1994, aged 68.

== See also ==
- List of MPs elected in the 1965 Ghanaian parliamentary election
