= Dzifa Bampoh =

Ghanaian journalist

Dzifa Gbeho Bampoh
- Education: University of Ghana, Achimota School
- Occupations: News anchor, broadcaster, journalist, PR practitioner
- Years active: 1997–present
- Known for: News anchor

Dzifa Gbeho Bampoh also known in media circles as Dzifa Bampoh is a Ghanaian journalist, communications and media personality. Dzifa is currently the Manager, Corporate Communications for the Ghana Grid Company LTD (GRIDCo) the "Operator" of Ghana’s National Interconnected Transmission System (NITS) where in addition to her communications portfolio, she is in charge of the company’s Brand, CSR and Corporate Communications.

Dzifa worked in three of Ghana’s media houses, Head of News at 3Fm and TV3, Editor and Broadcast Journalist at the Multimedia Group Limited Joy FM and the Ghana Broadcasting Corporation (GBC) where she used the name Dzifa Gbeho at GTV (Ghana), Uniiq FM, and the defunct GAR.

== Early life and education ==
Dzifa started her basic education in Nigeria attending Fountain School, Surulere, Lagos State from 1980 to 1987 with two years of secondary school at Federal Government Girls' College, Abuloma, Port Harcourt, Rivers State Nigeria. She then proceeded to Achimota School from 1989 to 1995 for O’ and A’ Level education.

Dzifa then proceeded to the University of Ghana in 1997 for a Bachelor of Arts Degree in English & History and then a Master of Arts in communication in 2006. She has also been trained with the DW Akademie in Bonn, Germany (September–November 2006) & Reuters (Nairobi, 2004).

== Career ==
=== Journalism ===
Dzifa has spent 20 years as an active media practitioner with a focus on Radio Broadcast Journalism from 1997 to 2017.

Dzifa started her career at the Radio Section of the Ghana Broadcasting Corporation (GBC) from 1997 to 2005, hosting the "UniiQ Breakfast Drive" (2002–2005) and GTV Youth Show, "Next Level" (from 2003 to 2004).

She then moved to the Multimedia Group Limited (Joy FM) from 2005 to 2017, playing various roles from editor in 2013–2017. Anchor for News Analysis Programme "Newsnite" from 2007 to 2017, Election Programme "Joint Caucus" in 2016 and Home Affairs from 2006 to 2012. Dzifa led Joy News Security Desk from 2015 to 2017 and was a presidential affairs correspondent from 2006 to 2008.

Dzifa is currently the head of general news 3Fm and TV3. She leads the radio & TV team providing guidance for news and current affairs. She also hosts, "First Take", a news analysis show on 3Fm, exclusive interview content and "Key Points" for TV3.

On Friday 8 July 2022, Dzifa joined GRIDCO after resigning from TV3.

=== Corporate communications and public relations ===
Dzifa was the Communications and Investor Relations Manager for Tullow Ghana from 2017 to 2020 in charge of corporate communication, media and investor relations strategy.

After an 18month stint at Media General’s TV3 and 3FM from March 2021 to July, 2022 Dzifa returned to corporate life on Monday 1 August 2022, when she joined the Ghana Grid Company Limited (GRIDCo).

== Awards ==
Dzifa is the recipient of the Women's Excellence Award – Media 2017, RTP's Radio Newscaster of the Year Award 2014 & 2011 as "Newsnite Anchor", CIMG Programme of the Year 2007 for JOY FM's "Home Affairs", and 2003 National Youth Council Youth Media Presenter for GTV's "Next Level".
