= Ato Ulzen-Appiah =

Ghanaian social entrepreneur and blogger

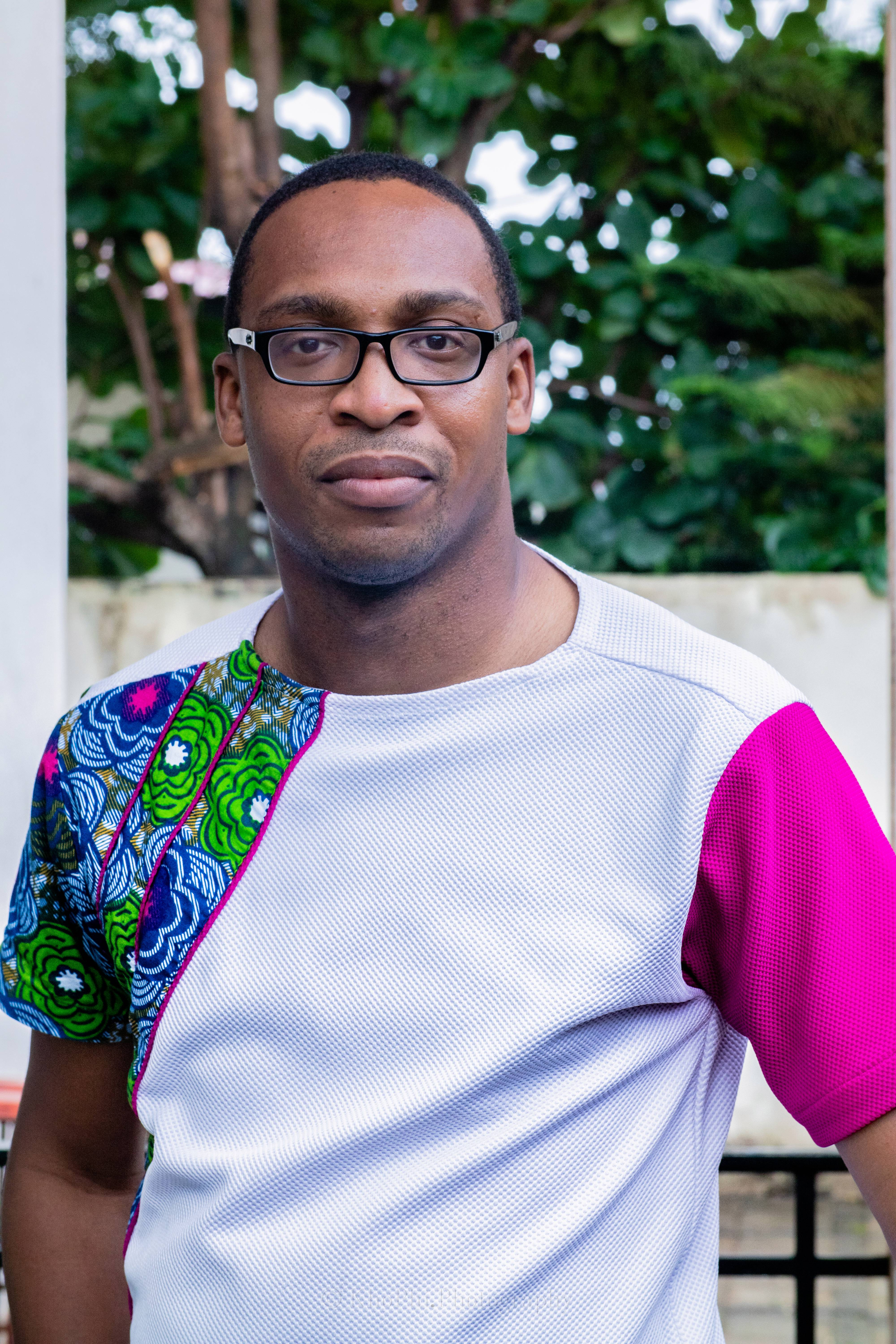
- Born: Ato Ulzen-Appiah; Syracuse, NY, United States
- Education: PRESEC Legon, Massachusetts Institute of Technology, Stanford University,
- Occupation(s): Civil Engineer, Consultant, and Social Entrepreneur
- Years active: 2009–present
- Spouse: Tracy Ulzen-Appiah

Ato Ulzen-Appiah (born 31 December 1983 in Syracuse) is a social entrepreneur, consultant, blogger and director of the GhanaThink Foundation who was named African Male Youth of the Year 2018. Barcamp Ghana, Junior Camp Ghana, Ghana Volunteer Program (National Volunteer Day), Komseko, are GhanaThink Foundation programs that champion the youth to take up volunteer roles in Ghana. Ato is an ardent social media user and mentors a lot of the youth.

== Early life and education ==
Ulzen-Appiah hails from Elmina but grew up in Kumasi, Ghana. He started his basic education at Kwame Nkrumah University of Science and Technology Primary School in Kumasi. He then proceeded to the Presbyterian Boys' Senior High School (PRESEC) for his secondary education. He later went to the Massachusetts Institute of Technology (MIT) for his bachelor's degree in Civil Engineering and master's degree in Construction and Engineering Management from Stanford University.

== Career ==
Ulzen-Appiah is currently the director of the GhanaThink Foundation which mobilises and organises talent for the primary benefit of Ghana. He started his professional career at Google as a program manager building sustainable tech communities in Africa, overseeing scores of tech events around the continent. He then joined Rancard as product manager building new revenue services off its platform, in charge of payments and content hosting. He co-founded Museke.com an African music website, with a focus on lyrics. He is a member Global Shapers Alumni of the World Economic Forum Accra hub. He has been on a lot of panels discussing the future of Africa and the new digital age using social media. He was a judge on the Seedstars Accra startup challenge.

Ulzen-Appiah works as a program manager at the Kosmos innovation center. In his role, he assists agribusiness startups to launch their businesses and also offer advisory services in the Kosmos innovation challenge which is a flagship program of the Kosmos innovation center.

In 2014, Ulzen-Appiah served as a guest panelist on Digital Media and Entertainment, during the 16th Annual Africa Business Conference at the Harvard Business School. He shared the panel with Solo Nnanna (A marketing manager for Viacom International) and Award-winning technologist Ade Olufeko. The panel was moderated by Uzodinma Iweala the Editor-in-Chief of Ventures Africa
