= Collins Adomako-Mensah =

Ghanaian politician

Hon. Collins Adomako-Mensah MP
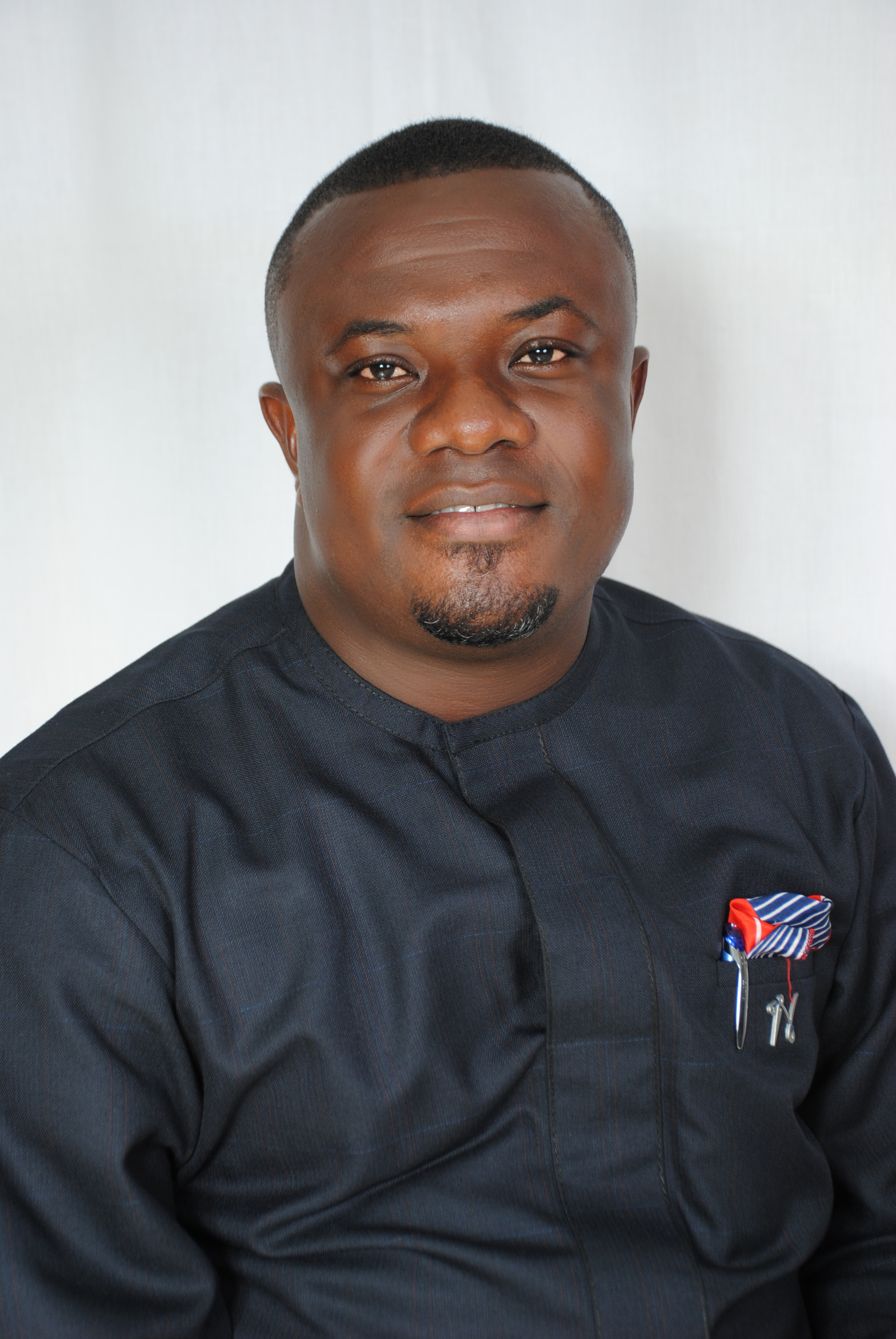

Member of Parliament for Afigya Kwabre North Constituency
- Incumbent
- Assumed office 7 January 2021
- Preceded by: Nana Amaniampong Marfo

Personal details
- Born: 2 November 1983 (age 42) Boaman-Maase
- Party: New Patriotic Party
- Occupation: Politician
- Profession: Financial Analyst
- Committees: Finance Committee, Health Committee

Collins Adomako-Mensah (born 2 November 1983) is a Ghanaian politician and member of the New Patriotic Party. He represents Afigya Kwabre North Constituency in the 8th parliament of the 4th Republic in Ghana.

== Early life and education ==
Adomako Mensah was born on 2 November 1983 and hails from Boaman Maase in the Ashanti Region. He attended the Presbyterian Boy's Senior Secondary School, Legon for his secondary school education. He was awarded a Bachelor of Arts degree in banking and finance and an Executive Master of Business Administration in 2007 and 2016 respectively and Master of Arts in economics at the University of Ghana (Legon).

== Career and politics ==
Adomako-Mensah has worked with financial institutions such as GCB, Fidelity bank as deputy manager, associate member of chattered institute of banking and relationship manager and member of the New Patriotic Party. During the 2020 NPP parliamentary primaries Adomako-Mensah contested for the Afigya Kwabre North seat against the then MP, Nana Marfo Amaniampong and won. In the 2020 Ghanaian general elections, Adomako- Mensah won the seat with 20,441 votes representing 65.75% as against his opponent Emmanuel Jackson Agumah of the NDC who polled 10646 representing 34.25% of votes cast.

In November 2021, Adomako-Mensah donated mathematical sets and other stationery to candidates in the Afigya Kwabre North Constituency in the Ashanti region.

=== Committees ===
Adomako-Mensah is a member of the finance committee and also a member of the health committee.

== Personal life ==
Adomako-Mensah is a Christian. He is the nephew of Albert Kan-Dapaah.

== Controversy ==
In 2020, he was alleged to have been involved in a GHS264,094 theft. He transferred some amount belonging to the Gen X Trading Company Limited to his company called AND Financial Services when he was the client service officer for the company. He did it between 2016 and 2017 without their permission and knowledge.
