= John Apea =

Ghanaian actor

- Born: London
- Education: University of Oxford University of Cambridge Stanford University
- Occupations: Ghana Head of Mission for Commonwealth Enterprise and Investment Council (CWEIC); CEO of eTranzact Ghana
- Known for: Home Sweet Home, Run baby Run
- Board member of: Chair for Interstandard Group Board Member for Commonwealth Human Rights Office Africa
- Awards: AMAA best screenplay for a film, Africa Movie Academy Awards in 2008, including the awards for Best Picture, Best Director and Best Screenplay.

Signature
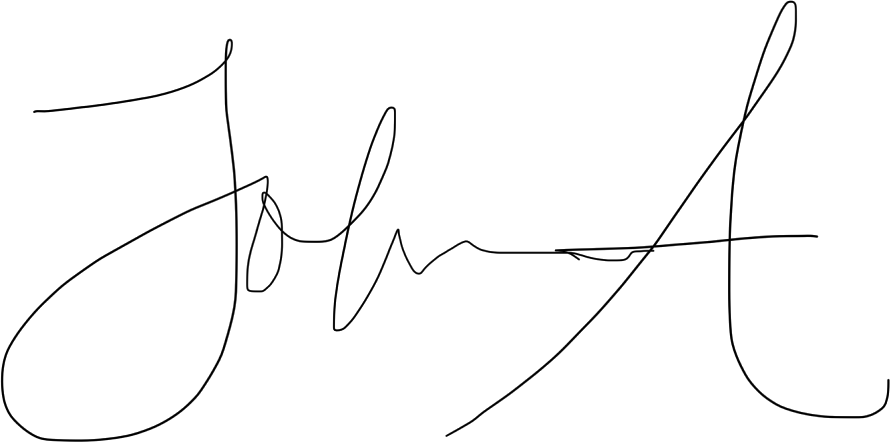

John Apea is the Ghana head of mission for the Commonwealth Enterprise and Investment Council (CWEIC). Co – currently, he is the chief executive officer of eTranzact, Ghana’s oldest and biggest Fintech organisation.

He is the previous Africa regional coordinator of The Royal Commonwealth Society and has extensive experience across communication, business and entrepreneurship. Current and previous roles include: special adviser, SCL Group and principal partner with Interstandard Group and PTE Banyubang. He has also worked in senior roles with the UK Office for Civil Society, advised senior leaders and Governments across Africa and executive produced award-winning media projects.

Apea holds graduate and postgraduate qualifications from the University of Oxford, the University of Cambridge and the University of York, in the United Kingdom. Apea is a Fellow of the Royal Society of Arts (UK) and a member of the Institute of Directors (UK).

He started his early career as an actor in Ghana. In 2008 he won the Africa Movie Academy Award for Best Screenplay for the film Run Baby Run in which he also featured as the lead actor.

Run Baby Run received eight nominations and won four awards at the Africa Movie Academy Awards in 2008, including the awards for Best Picture, Best Director and Best Screenplay.

== Early life, education and career ==
Apea was born to Rev. Dr. Emmanuel Apea Snr., a former diplomat and UN ambassador; and Emma Elizabeth Apea, a primary school teacher.

Apea studied at Presbyterian Boys' Senior High School and has degrees from University of York and the University of Oxford. He was one of the lead actors in the popular Ghanaian television series, Home Sweet Home and lead character in multiple award-winning film Run Baby Run (2006 film).

He is currently the chief executive officer (CEO) of eTranzact Ghana, one of the leading providers of mobile banking and payment services. Previously, Apea worked as the senior strategist to data and technology giants SCL Group and Cambridge Analytica and was Africa regional director for the Royal Commonwealth office. In this position, Apea had oversight across 19 African countries, and together with British High Commissions, planned all royal and Commonwealth-related events and promoted business opportunities within the African region.
