= Frema Adunyame =

Ghanaian broadcaster and journalist (born 1981)

Frema Adunyame (born 20 October 1981) is a Ghanaian broadcaster and journalist currently serving as the Head of Events & Partnership at Citi FM and Channel One TV (formerly Citi TV).

== Early life and education ==
Frema was born in Effiduase, near Ejisu in the Ashanti Region in October 20th, 1981. She completed St. Monica's Senior High School in Asante Mampong in 1999. She pursued graduate studies at the University of Ghana, earning a Master of Arts in Marketing StrategyShe was also named the only female valedictorian of the school of graduate studies during the graduation in 2025. She also earned her first degree from the same University in the School of Performing Arts. She was posted to TV3 for her National Service from 2006 to 2011 after which she started anchoring the news at eTV between 2011 and 2013. At a point she was the host of Good Morning Ghana on Metro TV from 2014 to 2018. She then officially joined Citi FM in 2018.

Prior to that, her first step into the media was a role as a panel member on GBC’s Garden City Radio, Kumasi. She then moved to Radio Mercury as a news presenter and later worked with Invisible FM (now Nhyira FM) and Fox FM, both based in Kumasi, in the Ashanti Region. Before joining Citi TV, part of the Citi FM group owned by Omni Media Limited on July 10, 2018, Frema spent four years at TV3 as a senior news anchor and reporter, after which she also worked with ETV News and Metro TV.

== Awards and recognition ==
- Outstanding media performance Sept 2025 at the Ghana Arts and Entertainment Awards.
