= Afigya Kwabre North (Ghana parliament constituency) =

Constituency in Ghana

- constituency for the Parliament of Ghana
- District: Afigya Kwabre North District
- Region: Ashanti Region of Ghana

Current constituency
- Created: 2012
- Party: New Patriotic Party
- MP: Collins Adomako-Mensah

Afigya Kwabre North is one of the constituencies represented in the Parliament of Ghana. It elects one Member of Parliament (MP) by the first past the post system of election. Afigya Kwabre North is located in the Afigya Kwabre North District of the Ashanti Region of Ghana.

== Boundaries ==
The Afigya Kwabre North constituency is located entirely within the boundaries of the Afigya Kwabre North District in the Ashanti Region. The district itself was inaugurated on 15 March 2018.

== Members of Parliament ==
| First elected | Member | Party |
|---|---|---|
Created 2012
| 2012 | Nana Amaniampong Marfo | New Patriotic Party |
| 2016 | Collins Adomako-Mensah | New Patriotic Party |

Nana Amaniampong Marfo of the New Patriotic Party was the first ever elected MP for this constituency in the 2012 Ghanaian general election. He retained his seat in the 2016 Ghanaian general election.

== Elections ==
2016 Ghanaian general election: Afigya Kwabre South
| Party | Candidate | Votes | % | ±% |
|---|---|---|---|---|
| New Patriotic Party | Nana Amaniampong Marfo | 17,978 | 71.52 | +2.18 |
| National Democratic Congress | Kwaku Agyekum Asare | 6,689 | 26.61 | +2.15 |
| Convention People's Party | Frank Opoku | 204 | 0.81 | 0.00 |
| Progressive People's Party | Francis Boadu | 197 | 0.78 | −3.45 |
| People's National Convention | Joyce Oduro | 68 | 0.27 | −0.20 |
| Majority | | 11,289 | 44.91 | +0.03 |
| Turnout | | 59,186 | 76.00 | −10.70 |
| Registered electors | | 33,353 | | — |

2012 Ghanaian general election: Afigya Kwabre South
| Party | Candidate | Votes | % | ±% |
|---|---|---|---|---|
| New Patriotic Party | Nana Amaniampong Marfo | 17,597 | 69.34 | — |
| National Democratic Congress | Alex Yaw-Poku | 6,207 | 24.46 | — |
| Progressive People's Party | Daniel Atta Asenso Peprah | 1,073 | 4.23 | — |
| Convention People's Party | Duah Hubert | 205 | 0.81 | — |
| National Democratic Party | Francis Boadu | 175 | 0.69 | — |
| People's National Convention | Joyce Oduro | 120 | 0.47 | — |
| Majority | | 11,390 | 44.88 | — |
| Turnout | | 25,644 | 86.70 | — |
| Registered electors | | 29,575 | | — |

== See also ==
- List of Ghana Parliament constituencies
