= Santeo =

- Town
- Location within Ghana
- Coordinates: 5°42′0″N 0°50′0″W
- Country: Ghana
- Region: Greater Accra Region
- District: Kpone Katamanso
- Time zone: GMT
  - Summer (DST): GMT

Santeo is a small town located in the Kpone Katamanso District in the Greater Accra Region of Ghana. The town shares boundary with Ashaiman and Tema. In 2018, a 4-unit classroom at a cost of Gh₡425,000 was donated by a group of Indians to promote education in Santeo.
