= Dancegod Lloyd =

Ghanaian dancer and choreographer

- Born: Laud Anoo Konadu; 25 May 1992 (age 34)
- Education: Presbyterian Boys' Senior High School
- Occupation: dancer
- Career
- Current group: Dance Grow Live Academy

Laud Anoo Konadu (born 25 May 1992), known professionally as Dancegod Lloyd, is a Ghanaian dancer, dance coach, and choreographer. He is a co-founder of the dance school, DWP academy, and founder of Dance Grow Live Academy (DGL Academy). In 2020, he performed in Beyonce's "Already" music video, which featured Shatta Wale. In 2023, he featured in a major commercial by Fly With Dubai in the United Arab Emirates.

== Early life ==
Laud Anoo Konadu was born on 25 May 1992 in a town called Kibi in the Eastern region of Ghana. He had his basic school education at Solidarity International School and later attended Presbyterian Boys Senior High School in Accra. He is born to Mr. Theophilus Konadu, his father and Mrs. Agnes Konadu, his mother.

== Career ==
He has performed in several music videos, including "Already" by Beyonce, "See Brother" by Patoranking, and "Shoo" by Kwamz and Flava.

In 2017, Dancegod and his former manager, Quables, and former dance partner, Afro Beast, initiated a charitable group called "Dance With Purpose Academy," which was aimed at helping young, talented dancers on the street.

== Original dances ==
Shoo — is a song by Kwamz and Flava but Dancegod Lloyd is credited to have created the dance steps.

== Discography ==
=== Singles ===
- "Sika" featuring Medikal
- "Corner Der" X DWP Academy, Afrobeast
- "Eheati" X DWP Academy, Afrobeast

== Music video appearances ==
- "Already" by Beyonce, Shatta Wale, Major Lazor (2019)
