= Eugene Arhin =

Ghanaian administrator and businessman

Director of Communications at the Presidency
- Incumbent
- Assumed office January 2017
- President: Nana Akufo-Addo

Personal details
- Born: Ghana
- Party: New Patriotic Party
- Spouse: R. Arhin
- Children: 5
- Education: Presbyterian Boys' Secondary School; Kwame Nkrumah University of Science and Technology University of Ghana business School
- Profession: engineer and communications specialist.

Eugene Arhin is a Ghanaian politician. He is a member of the New Patriotic Party and the former Director of communications at the office of the then President of Ghana, Nana Addo Dankwa Akufo-Addo.

== Education ==
Arhin is an alumnus of Presbyterian Boys' Secondary School, Legon, where he acquired his secondary school education. He furthered his education at the Kwame Nkrumah University of Science and Technology (KNUST) with a Bachelor of Science degree in Materials Engineering in 2006.

== Career ==
He worked as a teaching assistant for his mandatory one year national service at the Department of Materials Engineering. He also worked at the Danquah Institute, a think tank named after J. B. Danquah, as a research analyst.

=== Political life ===
In January 2017, he was appointed the Director of Communications at the Flagstaff House by President Nana Akufo-Addo. Prior to his appointment in 2017, He served as the press secretary to Nana Akufo-Addo for two years. In January 2021, after the re-election and investiture of Nana Akufo-Addo, he was reappointed by the President to his position.
