= Ghanaian Indian =

Ghanaian citizens of Indian origin

Ghanaian Indians
Total population
- Around 4,000

Regions with significant populations
- Ghana

Languages
- Mainly: Hindi; English (Ghanaian English); French; Also: Tamil; Bengali; Malayalam; Telugu; Punjabi; Sindhi; Gujarati; Akan (Note: To gain Ghanaian citizenship one is required to be able to speak and understand the Akan language.); other languages of Ghana

Religion
- Mainly: Hinduism; Christianity; Islam; Also: Sikhism; Jainism; Irreligion; Atheism

Related ethnic groups
- Indians; Indian diaspora

Ghanaian Indians (French: Indiens ghanéens; Akan: Nkɔmbɔtwetwe India Gaana) are Ghanaians citizens of Indian origin or descent. Many Ghanaian Indians are descendants of those who migrated from India following India's partition in 1947.

== History ==
=== Origins ===
The Indo-Aryan peoples and Sindhis, who were the first Indians to arrive in Ghana, initially came as merchants and shopkeepers, and gradually, in the 1950s and 1960s, ventures into manufacturing industries such as garments, plastics, textiles, insecticides, electronics, the pharmaceuticals, optical goods, etc. Some Indians who have lived in Ghana for most of their lives have acquired Ghanaian citizenship. Some families are now in the fourth generation in Ghana. Ghanaian Indians tend to have a higher income than the general population.

As far as records show, the first Indian (Sindhworki), Bhai Boolchand, landed on the shores of the ‘Gold Coast’ in the year 1890. Nearly twenty years later, in the year 1919, the first Sindhi company was established by two brothers, namely Tarachand Jasoomal Daswani and Metharam Jasoomal Daswani. They opened a store in the market place in the city of Cape Coast (which was the capital city in those days) in the year 1919, under the name of Metharam Jassomal Brothers. Their business flourished and branches were opened in Accra and Kumasi.

Few years later, the two brothers separated and whilst Bhai Metharam Jasoomal continued his business under ‘Metharam Brothers’, Bhai Tarachand Jasoomal operated his business under the name ‘Bombay Bazaar’. These were the first two Indian companies that were established in Ghana then the ‘Gold Coast’. In the 1920s, two more Indian firms were established under the name of Lilaram Thanwardas and Mahtani Brothers, and this trend continued in the 1930s and 1940s with the birth of several more Indian companies, namely T. Chandirams, Punjabi Brothers, Wassiamal Brothers, Hariram Brothers, K. Chellaram & Sons, G. Motiram, D. P. Motwani, G. Dayaram, V. Lokumal, Glamour etc. Soon after, as these companies were bringing in new expatriate staff, some staff left their employers, and ventured on their own and more and more companies opened up.

After 1947, the ‘Gold Coast’ attracted the attention of some Indian multinational companies, and big names like Chanrai, Bhojsons, K. A. J. Chotirmal, Dalamals, A. D. Gulab opened branches in Ghana. The employment of Ghanaians by these founding companies has also helped to lessen the burden of unemployment in the country. This amply demonstrates the level of commitment India has in the developmental agenda of Ghana. Indians not only invest in the manufacturing and commercial sectors of Ghana, but also in the financial sector. Bank of Baroda, one of the biggest and most reputable banks in India recently established a branch in Ghana and is to expand its operations in other parts of the country.

Most of the Indians who arrived in Ghana in 1947 and shortly afterwards acquired Ghanaian citizenship, which is granted without any discrimination. Social interaction between Ghanaian Indians and other Ghanaians is fairly widespread. There are partnerships between them in business deals and also mixed marriages. Ghanaians freely attend Indian social and cultural functions. The Ghanaian Indian community makes occasional donations to various worthy causes. Ghanaians have been quite appreciative of the role being played by Ghanaian Indians in the overall development of Ghana, and also for their culture and understanding towards others.

== Culture ==
The Ghanaian Indians are socially active. In Accra, they have set up an Indian association and an Indian social centre, both of which function from the premises of an Indian temple that has been constructed by the Ghanaian Indian community in Accra. Various social and cultural programs are organised there, as well as festivals to mark important religious days. Every Thursday and Sunday, Ghanaian Indians gather for their Kirtans and poojas. The temple also hosts a Yoga centre and Radhasoami (Beas) satsangs.

The Indian community has played, and continues to play, a key role in many fields. The Indian association has a representation on many governmental boards, institutions, and charitable organizations in Ghana. Many Indians have lived over 50 years in Ghana – the oldest residents have been in Ghana since 1939 – and they see Ghana as their first home.

== Education ==
Ghanaian Indians have high educational attainment. Well-to-do Ghanaian Indian families send their children to the Ghana International School, while others prefer less expensive schools. Some Ghanaian Indians send their children to India or other countries for their education.

Currently, there is one Indian School in Ghana—The Delhi Public School (DPS) in Tema, established in September 2010. It is affiliated to the Central Board of Secondary Education and the International General Certificate of Secondary Education, and is run by Delhi Public School Society, a New Delhi-based, private, registered non-profit.

== Economics ==
Many Ghanaian Indians are wealthy individuals and well off. They are either independent business people with business branches all over Ghana, or employees of various local companies, such as economic services and petroleum companies. Some are also owners of Ghanaian hotel chains, telecommunications and electronics companies etc. Major Indian companies and multinational conglomerates in Ghana include Tata Group, Bharti Airtel, Tech Mahindra and Bank of Baroda. Others work as doctors, medical technologists, and nurses in hospitals in Ghana.

== See also ==
- Indian Association of Ghana
- Ghanaian people
- Ghana–India relations
