= Gary Al-Smith =

Ghanaian sports journalist

Gary Al-Smith is a Ghanaian sports journalist who reports locally and for international media – with a focus on African football. He is also a global shaper and a UNICEF ambassador. He initially worked with Citi FM. However, he moved and is currently with Multimedia Group Limited radio station Joy FM based in Accra in the greater Accra Region of Ghana. He does stories for Guardian, BBC, CNN, the New York Times and SuperSport.
