= Kasapa FM =

- Accra; Ghana
- Broadcast area: Greater Accra Region
- Frequency: 102.5 MHz

Programming
- Languages: English, Twi
- Format: Local news, talk, sports, politics and music

Ownership
- Owner: Kwabena Duffuor
- Sister stations: Live FM, Starr FM (Ghana)

History
- First air date: December 2014

Links
- Website: kasapafmonline.com

Kasapa FM is a privately owned urban, lifestyle radio station, which focuses on music, entertainment/lifestyle-led talk programmes and sports. Kasapa FM is a multilingual radio station that broadcasts from 1st Floor of platinum Tower, Accra, the capital of Ghana, and can be listened both on 102.5 FM and online. The station is owned by former Ghana Finance Minister Kwabena Duffuor.
