= Indian Association of Ghana =

Organization

- Formation: 27 March 1939
- Type: Indian Merchants Association
- Website: Indian Association of Ghana

The Indian Association of Ghana (IAG) is a merchant association that has a long colourful history. In 1939, the first ever Indian Merchants Association in West Africa was formed in the ‘Gold Coast’. In fact, this was the first body created in the entire West African Region by Indian traders - Metharam Brothers, Bombay Bazaar, Lilaram Thanwardas, Mahtani Brothers, T. Chandiram, K. Chellaram, Hariram Brothers, Wassiamal Brothers, G. Motiram, Punjabi Brothers and D. P. Motwani. These were the founding members of what the Indian Association is today, and they elected Mr. K. W. Mahtani as their first President, and Mr. N. T. Daswani as their first Secreatary. The Constitution and by-laws were carefully drafted years later by Mr. P. K. Mahtani and Mr. Heman Dadlani. That same Constitution is still in force, though it has been amended in the year 2000, and further amended in the year 2006, to suit the present times.

== History of the IAG ==
Indians in Ghana are amongst the most respected community. The Indo-Ghana ties have been in existence for more than 100 years now and the Indo-Ghana relationship has always been warm and friendly. The strong foundation was further solidified by India's first Prime Minister Jawaharlal Nehru and Ghana's first President Kwame Nkrumah, two great leaders who enjoyed a special kind of friendship and a similar vision. Both were influential and instrumental in the formation of the Non-Aligned Movement (NAM) in 1961. Ghana has a relatively small but growing vibrant Indian Community, compared to South Africa. Though at present there are Indians from all communities and walks of life, the majority of those who first came to Ghana in early 20th Century were from the Sindhi community.

== Projects ==
The bond between Ghana and India is very historic since the times of Nkrumah and Nehru. There is a Jawaharlal Nehru road and the first building on that road is the Indian Ambassador's residence. It is of significance to note that the Flagstaff House which served as the office of President Nkrumah was located near India House, the residence of the High Commissioner of India. Coincidentally, when the current government deemed it prudent to build a presidential palace, it chose the same place for that wonderful architectural edifice designed from India.

=== Economy of Ghana ===
Indians are currently one of the biggest investors in Ghana and it is expected that this trend will continue. The Ghana Investment Promotion Council recently reported that India has the highest new large projects in Ghana. It shows the confidence that India has in Ghana's economy. The trade between India and Ghana has continued to expand every year. Companies such as TATA, Indian Farmers Fertiliser Cooperative Limited (IFFCO), etc. have their subsidiaries in Ghana.

=== Ambassador ===
The “Peace Ambassador”, Lok Bandhu Karki, a young man from Nepal, abandoned the comfort of his home on December 7, 2004, to cycle around the world for the sake of peace. The Indian Association volunteered to cover all expenses related to his stay in Ghana.

== See also ==
- Ghanaian Indian
