= Vision 1 FM =

Accra; Ghana
- Frequency: 93.5 MHz

Programming
- Language: Akan

Ownership
- Owner: Vision 1 FM Limited

Links
- Webcast: Listen live (via TuneIn)
- Website: http://www.vision1fm.com/

Vision 1 FM is a privately owned radio station in Accra, the capital of Ghana. The radio station is known for its Christian based programs and donations to the needy.
