= Stella Aba Seal =

Ghanaian female gospel musician

- Born: Stella Dugan; Eastern Region, Ghana
- Genre: Gospel
- Occupations: Singer, songwriter
- Instruments: Vocal
- Years active: (1980–present)

Stella Aba Seal is a Ghanaian female gospel musician.

== Early life ==
Stella was born to Mr. Theophilus Seal of British and Cameroonian parentage and Madam Violet Addo from Anum Boso in the Eastern Region of Ghana.

== Education ==
Stella started her basic education at the Accra New Town 4 School in Accra New Town, a suburb of Accra, and then proceeded to Kotobabi 2 Middle School also in Kotobabi, a suburb of Accra. She furthered her education at Accra Polytechnic, where she trained as a secretary after her GCE ‘O’ levels in 1981 at the City Secondary and Business College at Caprice in Accra. She received IATA Basic Certification in Passenger Handling, Sales, and Reservations from the Ghana Airways Training School. Also trained in dressmaking at Kalbs School of Fashion.

== Breakthrough in music ==
Although her debut album You Are In My Heart received little attention, her second album, Daadaa Nyinaa, propelled her to national recognition in the early 1990s and established her as one of Ghana’s leading gospel musicians.

In 2026, Seal spoke publicly about workplace sexual harassment, recounting that she had lost two jobs after rejecting inappropriate advances from employers. She urged women to report such misconduct and advocated for safer workplaces.

Seal has publicly called for stronger respect for copyright and intellectual property, urging musicians to obtain permission before recording or performing songs by other artists.

== Personal life ==
Seal was previously known as Stella Dugan, her marital name. She has three children with her ex-husband. Dugan reverted to her maiden name after her divorce.
