= Nana Amaniampong Marfo =

Ghanaian politician (born 1957)

Member of the Ghana Parliament for Afigya Kwabre North Constituency

Personal details
- Born: 6 March 1957 (age 69)
- Party: New Patriotic Party
- Education: University of Ghana

Nana Amaniampong Marfo (born 6 March 1957) is a Ghanaian politician and member of the 6th Parliament of the Fourth Republic of Ghana.

== Education and early life ==
Marfo obtained his GCE O-level certificate from Tetrem School and his GCE A-level from St. Augustine's College, Cape Coast. He earned a BSc Admin in Finance and Management and MBA in Marketing at the University of Ghana.

== Personal life ==
Marfo hails from Tetrem-Afigya in the Ashanti Region of Ghana. He is married with two children.

He is a Christian (Baptist).

== Politics ==
Marfo is a Ghanaian politician and a member of the Seventh Parliament of the Fourth Republic of Ghana representing the Afigya-Kwabre North Constituency in the Ashanti region of Ghana on the ticket of the New Patriotic Party.

=== 2012 election ===
Marfo first contested in the 2012 Ghanaian general election on the ticket of the New Patriotic Party for Afighya-Kwabre North in the Ashanti region of Ghana and won the election with 17,597 votes, representing 69.34% of the total votes. He won the election over Alex Yaw-Poku of the National Democratic Congress, Daniel Atta Asenso Preprah of the PPP, Duah Hubert of the Convention People's Party, Francis Boadu of the NDP and Joyce Oduro of the PNC. They obtained 6,207 votes, 1,073 votes, 205 votes, 175 votes and 120 votes respectively out of the total votes, equivalent to 24.46%, 4.23%, 0.81%, 0.69%, and 0.47% respectively.

=== 2016 election ===
Marfo contested for Afighya-Kwabre North parliamentary seat in the 2016 Ghanaian general election on the ticket of New Patriotic Party and won the election with 17, 978 votes representing 71.52% of the total votes. He won the election over Kwaku Agyekum Asare of the National Democratic Congress who polled 6,689 which is equivalent to 26.61%, the Convention people's party parliamentary candidate Frank Opoku had 204 votes representing 0.81%, the parliamentary candidate of the PPP Francis Boadu had 197 votes representing 0.78% and PNC parliamentary candidate Joyce Oduro polled 68 votes which is equivalent to 0.27% of the total votes.

During the 2020 NPP primaries, Marfo lost the election to Collins Adomako Mensah to represent the New Patriotic Party in 2020 Ghanaian general election.

== Employment ==
After completing his studies at the University of Ghana in 1989, Marfo worked as a national service personnel at National Mobilization. From 1991 to 1994 he was a Senior Superintendent at the Ghana Education Service (GES). A year after leaving GES, he was appointed senior manager of the Ghana Commercial Bank working as the SME head of the Northern Sector. He served in that capacity from 1995 to 2012. From 2009 to 2012 he doubled as a lecturer at the University College of Education.
