= Paul Adom Otchere =

Ghanaian journalist

- Born: Accra, Ghana
- Education: Presbyterian Boys' Senior High School; University of Ghana; University of London
- Occupation: Broadcast journalist
- Years active: 1999–present
- Notable credit(s): Good Evening Ghana, Metro TV (Ghana)

Paul Adom Otchere is a Ghanaian broadcast journalist and the host of Good Evening Ghana - a current affairs TV program in Ghana. He served as a board member of the National Communications Authority before he was appointed as chairperson of board of Ghana Airports Company Limited.

== Early life and education ==
Otchere grew up in Burma Camp (Accra, Ghana) where his father served, first as an infantry lieutenant with the 3rd Battalion and later as a finance officer with the army's pay corps. His early education was at Garrison Primary School in Burma Camp; his secondary education was at Presbyterian Boys' Senior High School. He later gained admission to the University of Ghana where he graduated with a Bachelor of Arts in Politics and Classics. He then studied law, obtaining an LLB from the same university. He also studied at the University of London’s School of Oriental and African Studies where he was awarded a Master of Science in Development Economics.

== Broadcast career ==
Otchere worked as a news reporter in the late 1990s and was awarded 'Best News Reporter' in 2001 by the Ghana Journalists Association. He covered the 2001 United Kingdom general election working as a news reporter for the BBC.

He is the producer and the host of one of Ghana's longest political talk show Good Evening Ghana where he has interviewed notable Ghanaians.

== Award ==
He won Best News Reporter in 2021 organized by Ghana Journalist Association

== Personal life ==
He married Rosemary Adom Otchere on 30 December 2005. His wife received appointment from President Akufo-Addo as the new Deputy Chief Executive of the Ghana Export-Import (EXIM) Bank.
