= Live FM =

- Accra; Ghana
- Broadcast area: Greater Accra Region
- Frequency: 91.9 MHz

Programming
- Language: English
- Format: Local news, talk, sports, politics and music

Ownership
- Owner: Kwabena Duffuor; (Quest Fine Limited)
- Sister stations: Kasapa FM, Starr FM (Ghana)

History
- First air date: September 2003

Links
- Website: livefmonline.com

Live FM is a privately owned urban, lifestyle radio station, which focuses on entertainment and sports content in the talk show genre. Live FM broadcasts from Feroah Avenue, Adabraka, Accra, the capital of Ghana, on 91.9 FM and online. The station is owned by former Ghana Finance Minister Kwabena Duffuor.
