= Denzel Prempeh =

Ghanaian born gospel musician and pastor

- Denzel Prempeh

Background information
- Born: Denzel K. O. Agyeman-Prempeh; 17 April; Accra, Greater Accra, Ghana
- Origin: Ejisu, Ashanti region
- Genres: Gospel; contemporary Christian; urban contemporary gospel; inspirational/worship
- Occupations: Pastor, singer, songwriter, preacher
- Instruments: Vocals, songwriter, keyboard
- Years active: 2010–present
- Label: HeartBeatMusic
- Website: www.revdenz.com

Denzel Prempeh born 17 April, is a Ghanaian gospel musician and pastor. He joined the Love Project Choir in 2006 under the leadership of Danny Nettey, and served as a reverend minister at Destiny Chapel in Adenta, Accra. In 2010, he founded the HeartBeatMinistries, a worldwide Christian outreach ministry which has HeartBeatMusic, a non-denominational Christian mission music group, under which he has released projects and engages in revival meetings of worship.

== Early life and education ==
Denzel studied at the University of Ghana, where he joined the Chosen Vessel Choir, and subsequently became the musical director of the University's Mass Choir. In 2006, he joined the Love Project Choir, led by Danny Nettey.

== Career ==
In 2010, Denzel founded the Christian music group Heartbeat Music (HBM), based in Ghana and off shoot of HeartBeatMinistries. His program, Touching God's Heart (TGH), was awarded the Best Event Management System award by SHINE Awards in 2017. Heartbeat Music Worldwide has organized various Christian music events over the years. In 2017, the Heartbeat Foundation was established to support families of individuals with cerebral palsy.

In June 2025, Denzel launched the 15th edition of his annual Touching God's Heart worship concert, an event on Ghana's gospel calendar with participation from gospel musicians who align with the event's purpose.

== Personal life ==
Denzel Agyeman-Prempeh is married to Maame Abena Agyeman-Prempeh and has two daughters. He was a pastor at Destiny Chapel in Adenta, Accra.

== Discography ==
List of Live Albums
Year	Title	Ref
2014	Tent Experience	
2015	A Sound From Heaven	
2020	Deeper Touch	

List of Extended Plays
Year	Title	Ref
2017	Jesus Medley	

=== Major singles ===
- "Sweet Holy Spirit"
- "Obiaa Enihor feat. KODA"
- "Meni Obiaa (I Have No One)"
- "Ayeyi (Praise)"

=== Live Recording Concerts ===
- (2011) The Worship Concert
- (2012) A Heart of Worship
- (2013) Tent Experience
- (2014) A Sound From Heaven
- (2015) Wordship
- (2015) JUWA (Just As We Are)
- (2015) ROTAB (Revelations of the Alabaster Box)
- (2016) Dipped in Grace
- (2017) A Deeper Touch
- (2017) Victory (TGH-UK)
- (2017) Testify (TGH-USA)
- (2018) The Potter and Clay Experience
- (2019) The Wilderness Experience
