= Owuraku Ampofo =

Ghanaian sports journalist

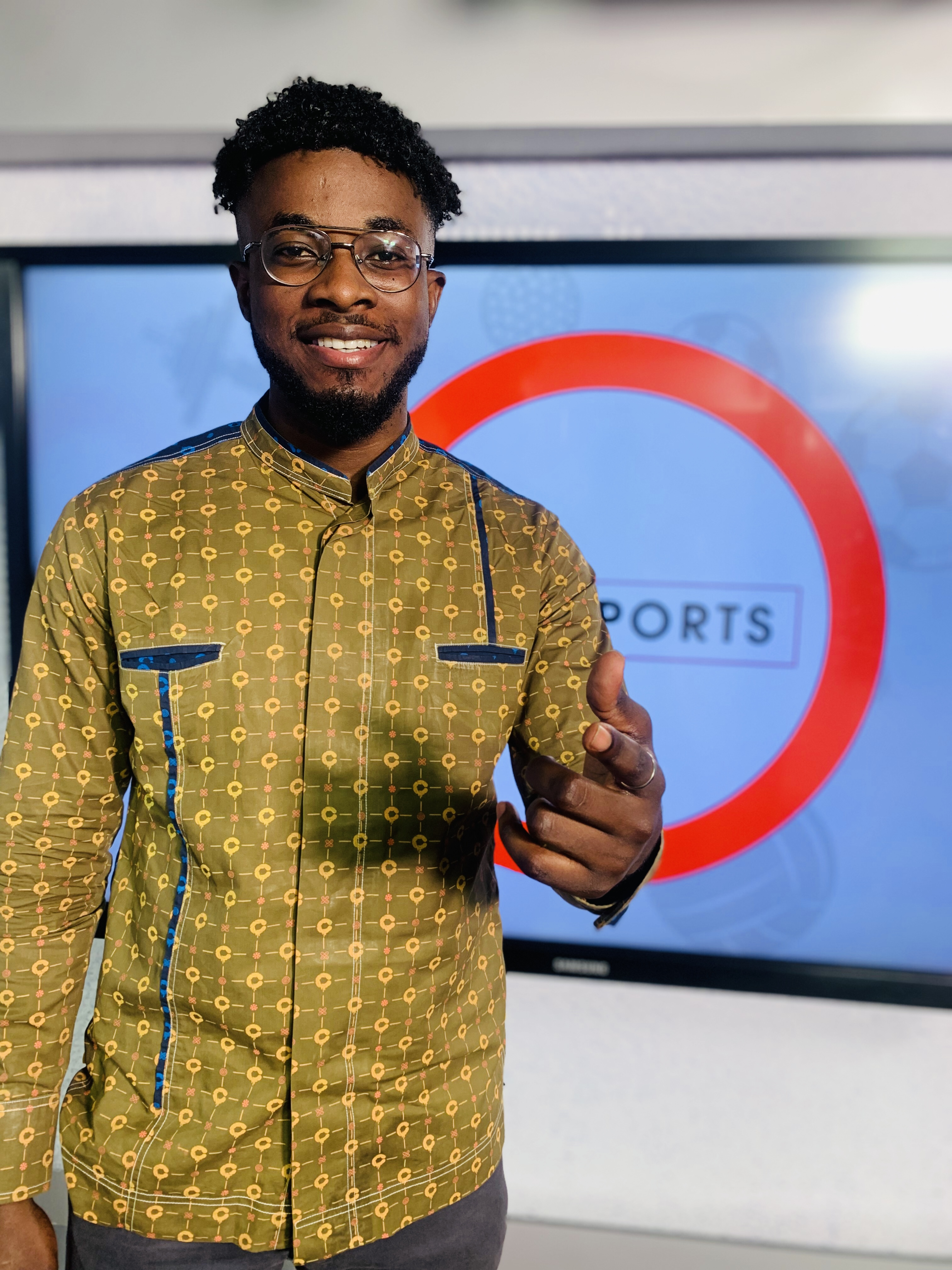
Owuraku Ampofo presenting at Joy News Ghana

Owuraku Ampofo is a Ghanaian sports journalist and writer known for his use of data in journalism. He is former presenter of Prime Sport on Joy News and the current sports anchor at TV3 Ghana and also the Acting Head of Sports at 3sports.

== Early life and education ==
Owuraku Ampofo was born on October 9, 1996 in Ghana. He is Akan and grew up in Koforidua, a city in the Eastern Region of Ghana. From 2009 to 2011, Ampofo attended Faith Montessori School for his general studies. He earned a bachelor’s degree in Computer Science at the esteemed Ashesi University. He is also an alumnus of Presbyterian Boys' Secondary School where he had his high school education.

== Career ==
During his time in college in 2018, Owuraku started out as a football player, competing for Koans FC in the Ashesi League's third division. Before interning and starting his full-time job as a sports journalist at Joy FM (Ghana), he started off writing for sports start-ups like the Ghana Fans blog, Sportskeeda, and others. In 2017, he began working there full-time. Owuraku resigned from his role as host of Prime Sport at Joy News in 2022 to join TV3 Ghana the same year. He is Ghana's Flashscore manager.

== Recognition ==
In 2019, he was one of 100 invitees to a conference supported by the British Council. He was named the Ubora Sports Man of the Year during his time at Ashesi University. In 2021, Owuraku was announced as one of Avance Media's 50 Most Influential Young Ghanaians.

In 2022, Owuraku Ampofo was named sports influencer of the year 2022 at the Pulse Influencer Awards.
