= Luv FM =

Radio station in Kumasi, Ghana

Kumasi; Ghana
- Broadcast area: Ashanti Region
- Frequency: 99.5 MHz

Programming
- Language: English
- Format: Local news, talk and music

Ownership
- Owner: Multimedia Group Limited

History
- First air date: 1995

Links
- Website: Multimedia Ghana website

Luv FM is a privately owned radio station in Kumasi, the Ashanti Region of Ghana. The station is owned and run by the media group company Multimedia Group Limited.
