= Nhyira FM =

- Kumasi; Ghana
- Broadcast area: Greater Accra Region
- Frequency: 104.5 MHz

Programming
- Languages: English, Twi
- Format: Local news, talk and music

Ownership
- Owner: Multimedia Group Limited

Links
- Website: Multimedia Ghana website

Nhyira FM is a privately owned radio station in Kumasi, the Ashanti Region of Ghana.

The station is owned and run by the media group company Multimedia Group Limited. Nhyira is a Twi word meaning 'blessing'.
