= Adom FM =

Radio station

Coordinates: 5°34′37.49″N 0°12′50.79″W

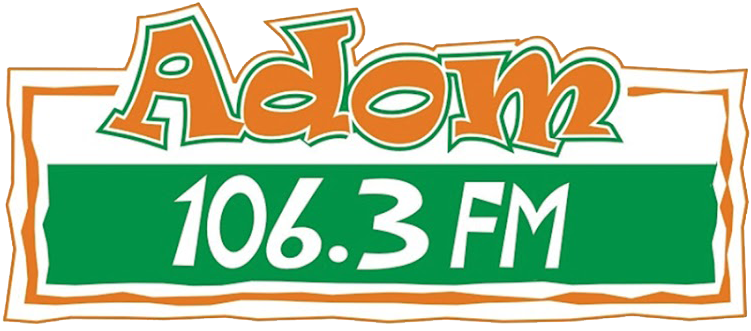
- Accra; Ghana
- Broadcast area: Greater Accra Region
- Frequency: 106.3 MHz

Programming
- Languages: English, Twi
- Format: Local news, talk and music

Ownership
- Owner: Multimedia Group Limited; (Aero Communications Ltd.)

Links
- Website: Multimedia Ghana website

Adom FM is a privately owned radio station in Accra, the capital of Ghana. The station is owned and run by the media group company Multimedia Group Limited. The word adom means 'grace' in Twi.

Adom FM organizes the annual gospel music concert Adom Praiz.
