= Multimedia Group Limited =

Media group in Ghana

Coordinates: 5.565308°N 0.207195°W

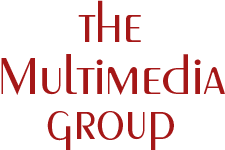
- Type: Privately held company
- Industry: Media
- Founded: Accra
- Founder: Kwasi Twum
- Headquarters: Ghana
- Area served: Worldwide online
- Products: Joy FM; Joy News; Joy Prime; Luv FM; Adom TV; Adom FM; Asempa FM; Nhyira FM
- Website: multimediaghana.com

The Multimedia Group is a media group in Ghana. It was established in 1995 and has six radio stations, four television stations, two news websites and a satellite television network, Multi TV.

The group has won several local and international awards for its leadership in information communication in Ghana and the world. Its pioneer radio station, Joy FM was adjudged the second best radio station on the African continent by the British Broadcasting Corporation in 2006.

== Services ==
Multimedia Group was established in 1995 by Ghanaian entrepreneur Kwasi Twum. The first radio station went on air in 1995 starting with 12 employees. The media group was started in Accra, Ghana.

=== Radio stations ===
Multimedia Group owns six radio stations in the Ashanti Region and Greater Accra Region. The stations are:

- Joy FM
- Luv FM
- Nhyira FM
- Asempa FM
- Hitz FM
- Adom FM

=== Television stations ===
The group operates Joy News, Joy Prime, Joy Learning and Adom TV.

== Affiliations ==
The group has affiliations with several radio stations in Ghana and thirteen in Europe.

== Staff ==
The group employs about 400 staff with about two thirds being permanent. Four percent of the group's annual turnover is invested in staff capacity development.

In December 2021, general manager of The Multimedia Group’s Joy Brands (Joy FM, My Joy Online, JoyNews, Hitz FM and Joy Prime) Elvis Kwashie died.

== Awards ==
The group through its media houses has several awards including:

- Charted Institute of Marketing Ghana (CIMG) Award for Media Organization of the Year 2008 – Multimedia Group
- CIMG Award for Best Morning Show of the Year 2008 – Joy FM
- Ghana Journalists Association Programme of the Year - Joy FM's Super Morning Show
- CIMG Award for Best Digital Media of the Year 2019 – My Joy Online
- CIMG Award for Best New Media Commercial Awards of the Year 2019 – My Joy Online
- CIMG Award for Radio Programme of the Year 2019 – Joy FM's Super Morning Show
- CIMG Award for Media Organization of the Year 2019 – Multimedia Group
