= Ghana Journalists Association =

Association

The Ghana Journalists Association (GJA) is the umbrella organization to which all journalists in Ghana belong. The current president is Mr Albert Kwabena Dwumfour. Established on August 15, 1949, it advocates for media professionalism, press freedom, ethical journalism, and journalist welfare. The association is one of the recognized media organizations represented on the National Media Commission and has its headquarters at the Ghana International Press Centre in Accra.

Ghana Journalists Association (GJA) has become the umbrella organization representing Ghanaian journalists. It is registered as a professional association and listed as one of several bodies on the board of the National Media Commission.

In May 2021, the GJA, Ghana Independent Broadcasters Association and the Private Newspaper Printers Association of Ghana urged the National Security to apologize to the management of Citi FM and Citi TV due to the alleged assault and maltreatment of Caleb Kudah and the invasion of the media house.

Albert Dwumfour, the president of the Ghana Journalists Association (GJA), delivered a speech addressing the concerning rise in threats and attacks targeting journalists while they perform their duties. The address took place at the Ghana International Press Center in Accra on July 18, 2023.

Mr. Albert Kwabena Dwumfour, the president of the Ghana Journalists Association (GJA), has revealed intentions to introduce the "See Something, Say Something to a Journalist" campaign. The primary objective of this initiative is to promote the reporting of suspicious activities or information by individuals to journalists, with the aim of supporting the efforts of security agencies.

The speaker emphasized their distinct initiative aimed at supporting security agencies by disseminating information on crimes and attacks against journalists, separate from national security efforts.

== Awards and recognition ==
PRESIDENT	TERM OF OFFICE	PROFESSION	NOTES
Kabral Blay-Amihere	1992-1996	Journalist	Former Ghana High Commissioner to Sierra Leone
Gifty Affenyi-Dadzie	1996-2003	Journalist	First Female GJA President
Ajoa Yeboah-Afari	2003-2007	Journalist	Veteran Journalist
Ransford Tetteh	2007-2013	Journalist	Former editor of the Daily Graphic
Affail Monney	2013-2022	Journalist	Media Advocate
Albert Kwabena Dwumfour	2022-present	Broadcast Journalist	Current President

== Notable people ==
- Albert Kwabena Dwumfour, president of the association.
- Georgina Ama Ankumah, broadcast journalist, news presenter with GBC as the Ashanti Regional Correspondent
- Maltiti Sayida Sadick, journalist, media personality and news achor
- Nana Aba Anamoah, General Manager of GHOne TV and Starr 103.5 FM
- Della Russel Ocloo, reporter at Graphic Communications Limited in the Tema Municipality.
- Diana Ngon, Northern Regional correspondent of Citi News
- Eunice Akoto Attakora-Manu, broadcast journalist, news presenter with Pure FM
- Alice Aryeetey, broadcast journalist and news reporter who currently works with GHOne TV.
- Auguster Asantewa Boateng, broadcast journalist
- Vivian Kai Lokko, media personality, journalist and business anchor at Citi FM
- Dzifa Bampoh, journalist, communications and media personality, Senior Editor at 3Fm and TV3
- Audrey Gadzekpo, media practitioner
- Regina Asamoah, broadcast journalist
