= Edward Adeti =

Ghanaian investigative journalist

- Born: Edward Adeti; Accra, Ghana
- Occupations: Investigative journalist, Journalist
- Known for: Media Without Border
- Website: https://mwbonline.org/

Edward Adeti is an investigative journalist with dual nationality - Ghanaian and Nigerian. He is known for his extensive on work on anti-corruption. Adeti is a journalist with Media Without Borders. In September 2024, he was crowned the P.V. Ansah Journalist of the Year 2023 at the 28th Ghana Journalists Association (GJA) Media Awards.

== Career ==
Edward Adeti work became known in Ghana during his time as the Upper East Regional correspondent for Starr FM and GhOne, both radio and television owned by Excellence In Broadcasting (EIB) Network. He later joined The Fourth Estate, a project of the Media Foundation for West Africa (MFWA). Currently, Adeti has formed his own media firm named Media Without Borders. Prior to these roles, he also gained working experience with the Daily Dispatch newspaper.

== Prosecution ==
Edward Adeti faced threats from Shaanxi Mining company after he exposed an alleged bribery attempt by the company's Managing Director, Charles Taleog Ndanbon. Adeti reported that Ndanbon had offered him a bribe of GH₵5,000 and a motorbike, presumably to drop a story he has worked on concerning the company and a high court judge, Jacob Boon, in 2018. The exposé later led to Rockson Bukari resigning from the government of President Nana Addo Dankwa Akufo-Addo on April 29, 2019. The story on the bribery scandal also resulted in the disqualification of the high court judge from a case involving Shaanxi and Cassius, an Australian mining company. It was widely reported that the judge was also demoted as a result of the investigative story.

=== Defamation Suit ===
Edward Adeti faced a defamation lawsuit from BONABOTO, an organization based in Bolgatanga, the Upper East Regional capital. The suit stemmed from Adeti's publication titled "BONABOTO's Chair Assaults Starr Reporter." In their legal action, BONABOTO sought an apology, a retraction of the story, and GH₵20,000 in damages from the journalist. However, in an unexpected turn of events, the Bolgatanga Circuit Court ruled in favor of Adeti. The presiding judge awarded the journalist GH₵4,000 in damages against the plaintiff, BONABOTO.

BONABOTO also lodged a complaint with Ghana's National Media Commission (NMC) in 2020, claiming Adeti wrote a false story that the organization's former chairman, Francis Atintono, was arrested by police for narcotics activities. The NMC exonerated Adeti after the commission's investigation proved that the organization's chairman was once arrested and detained by police for narcotic activities.

=== Court fined Adeti Gh₵33,000.00 for defamation ===
A Bolgatanga Magistrate Court ruled against Edward Adeti in a defamation case 2018, imposing a total fine of GH₵33,000. The case came from a story Adeti published concerning Madam Hajira Ibrahim, wife of a former Upper East Regional Director of Health Services, Dr Kofi Issah.

Presiding Magistrate Osman Abdul-Hakeem ordered Adeti to pay GH₵20,000 in compensation for defamatory comments broadcast on January 29, 2017, via Bolgatanga-based A1 Radio and its nationwide affiliates. The court further mandated an additional GH₵10,000 for natural damages resulting from the defamation, plus GH₵3,000 in legal costs.

== Notable works ==
Adeti has conducted a number of investigative projects across Ghana and other African nations, often collaborating with international investigative organizations. His portfolio of work includes the following:

=== Stealing from the Sick ===
Edward Adeti uncovered a critical issue at Bolgatanga Regional Hospital, exposing a syndicate responsible for drug shortages. His work revealed how this criminal network disrupted the hospital's medication supply, potentially costing lives. The investigation detailed the syndicate's operations within the hospital's supply chain, highlighting the severe consequences of corruption in healthcare.

=== Cash for justice ===
Edward Adeti uncovered findings that corroborate public allegations of corruption within the Attorney-General's Department. This government body is primarily responsible for representing the state in legal proceedings, prosecuting individuals charged with crimes, and providing legal counsel to government departments. However, widespread complaints from the general public suggest that certain criminal elements within the Attorney-General's Department are obstructing justice by accepting bribes to help crime suspects evade punishment. Adeti's investigation sheds light on these concerning practices, adding weight to the existing accusations of misconduct within this crucial legal institution.

=== Clinician dumps baby in morgue 'alive' ===
Investigative journalist Edward Adeti uncovered a disturbing case of medical negligence where a clinician mistakenly declared a baby dead and placed the still-living infant in a morgue. The error was discovered when signs of life were later detected in the child. Adeti's report exposed this critical mistake, raising concerns about medical protocols, accountability, and the quality of healthcare. The investigation prompted discussions on improving practices for verifying deaths, especially in infants, and highlighted the importance of thorough medical examinations.

=== Torture on gallows:The gruesome ordeal of a Kassena-Nankana farmer ===
In a shocking incident in Yua, a border town in Northern Ghana, Atanga Ayamga fell victim to a brutal mob attack based on unfounded accusations of grave desecration. The assailants tied Ayamga to an improvised gallows and severely beat him, intending to kill him to prevent him from reporting the torture. Although Ayamga survived, he was left with a paralyzed hand, impacting his livelihood. In an attempt to cover up their crime, the attackers consulted shrines in Ghana and Burkina Faso, both of which declared Ayamga innocent. Law enforcement arrested thirteen individuals, including a local assembly member, but some suspects remain at large. The incident has sparked calls for justice and highlighted the dangers of mob violence in remote communities.

=== Blood gold ===
Through this reports he highlighted the abuses that are reportedly being perpetrated by some Asian mining companies against the indigenous people of Talensi. In 2022, he co-authored a series of reports with Eryk Bagshaw, an Australian journalist, and some other international journalists at The Sydney Morning Herald and The Age in Australia, turning the spotlight on human rights abuses in Talensi. One of such international reports, dubbed Blood Gold, revealed how a Chinese company reportedly stole millions of dollars in gold from Ghana and caused the deaths of several Ghanaians. Blood gold attracted a number of award nominations globally. The investigative piece won the First Place in Best Use of Visual Journalism and Storytelling Tools at the 2023 Global Media Awards organised by the International News Media Association (INMA) in New York, USA.

== Awards and nominations ==
Media awards
Year	Award	Result	
Ghana Journalism Award	2024	P.V. Ansah Journalist of the Year 2023	Won
Ghana Journalism Award	2023	Crime/Court	Won
Article 19 Press prize Awards	2019	Third prize winner Corruption at the Attorney General’s office in Upper East Region	Won

== Personal life ==
Edward Adeti is married with three children
