= Alice Aryeetey =

Ghanaian broadcast journalist

- Citizenship: Ghanaian
- Education: Ghana Institute of Journalism
- Occupations: News anchor, broadcaster
- Employer: EIB Network
- Organization: GHOne TV
- Children: 1

Alice Aryeetey is a Ghanaian broadcast journalist and news reporter who currently works with GHOne TV. She won the Best TV News Reporter of the Year Award at the 2019 Ghana Journalists Association awards.

== Early life and education ==
Aryeetey graduated with a BSc. degree in Communication Studies from the Ghana Institute of Journalism.

== Career ==
Aryeetey began as a journalist and deputy news editor of GHOne TV since 2016. She also leads a group of volunteers who help families with children living with disabilities.

In 2021, she was selected for the 2021 Mandela Washington fellowship.

== Awards and recognition ==
Aryeetey was the first journalist to be recognized and awarded by the Ghana Federation of Disability Organizations through their Disability Excellence awards scheme and she won the Best TV News Reporter and Best SDGs Reporter at the 2019 Ghana Journalists Association (GJA) awards. She was also nominated by the Thomson foundation and the Foreign Press Association for the 2018 Young Journalist Award in the UK and was named the Most Promising Young Journalist of the year in Ghana by the Ghana Journalists Association (GJA). In 2017, she won the Best Journalist in producing TV reports on Education. She also won the GJA award for Best Journalist in reporting on disability.

Aryeetey received an award from GJA for reporting on Disability In 2021, she was selected for the 2021 Mandela Washington Fellowship

== Personal life ==
Aryeetey is married with a child.
