= Serwaa =

Serwaa is both a Ghanaian feminine given name and surname. Notable people with the name include:

== Given name ==
- Serwaa Amihere (born 1990), Ghanaian journalist
- Nana Afia Kobi Serwaa Ampem II (1907–2016), Ghanaian queen
- Ophelia Serwaa Amponsah, Ghanaian footballer
- Serwaa Annin, Ghanaian politician
- Barbara Serwaa Asamoah, Ghanaian lawyer and politician
- Nana Yaa Serwaa Sarpong (born 1983), Ghanaian media personality and entrepreneur

== Surname ==
- Akosua Serwaa (born 1981), Ghanaian middle-distance runner
