= Kwame Adinkra =

Ghanaian broadcast journalist

Luther King Kwame Adinkra, popularly called Kwame Adinkra or Apotiti Mati, is a Ghanaian broadcast journalist, singer, philanthropist and a public speaker. He was formerly the host and chief operating officer manager for Angel Broadcasting Network. He is currently the Morning Show Host on Pure FM.

== Education ==
He holds PhD in Visual Communication Design, master of philosophy in communication design, and a Bachelor of Arts degree in graphic design from Kwame Nkrumah University of Science and Technology.

== Life and career ==
He was the host of the morning show on Angel fm and moved to Abusua fm. He is currently the host of a morning show on Pure Fm. He is in the position of a business manager at the Kumasi-based Pure FM.

He respects tradition and culture and has a firm root at the Manhyia Palace. He is a serving member of the five-member planning committee formed Otumfuo Osei Tutu II, king of Asante, to work on the modalities of Otumfuo Charity Foundation Teachers Award.

He has featured as a prominent judge on reality shows on TV such as TV3 Mentor, Ghana's Most Beautiful and the maiden edition of Coca-Cola Hit Single. He was the chairman of the entertainment committee of the Kumasi Venue Organizing Committee of CAN 2008. His team of producers includes Eunice Akoto Attakora-Manu, Evans Osei-Bonsu and Kwame Tanko will as head of his production team.

== Controversy ==
Kwame was suspended by the EIB Media Network for his failure to appear on his morning show program, Abusua Nkomo on Kumasi-based Abusua FM. It was claimed it was due to failure in settling arrears in his salaries. It was also claim it was because of him agreeing a deal with Pure FM whilst still working as a staff of the network.

== Awards ==
- 2015 Best Morning Show Host, Radio and Television Personality Awards (RTP).
