= Abofour =

Coordinates: 7°08′N 1°45′W

- Interactive map of Abofour
- Country: Ghana
- Region: Ashanti Region

Abofour is a town in the Offinso Municipality in Ashanti Region of Ghana. It is the second largest town in the Municipality after the Offinso township. It is in fact one of the most populated townships in the Ashanti REGION of Ghana. Though Offinso is the Municipal capital, Abofour undoubtedly is the economic hub of the municipality by the virtue of having one of the largest markets in the country.

== History ==
It was founded around the year 1700 by a hunters called Bala and Atampo who was named by the Asantes as obofour Takyi who was Atampo and Obofour Ogya was Bala the fearless hunter.Who allied with then Asantehene Otumfuo Osei Tutu to overthrow the Denkyera. 'Abofour,' means 'The hunters'.

== Demographics ==
The town has a population of about 35000, with a slight majority (49%) belonging to the Ashante ethnic group. The rest of the population are mainly of Northern descent;Hausa, Mande (Wangara), Mossi, Mamprusi, Wala, Dagaare, Dagomba, Kusasi, Tem (Kotokoli, Chamba, Kusuntu, Balanka and other dialects spoken by mid and Northern parts of Togo and Benin Republics) and some few Eves.

== Education ==
St. Jerome Secondary School is a Catholic Unit institution assisted by the government. The town has about twelve public basic schools and about five private basic schools. The school is a second cycle institution.

== Economy ==
Abofour has daily markets in almost each of its suburbs, but the main market day is on Thursdays. The market is attended by people from all walks of life and from different directions across Ghana and the neighboring countries as well. It is perhaps the fourth largest in Ghana but in third in Ashanti region terms of size and patronage especially. Until 2017, the market used to operate along the main Kumasi-Techiman highway which used to endanger traders and passers by. It also used to cause unnecessary vehicular traffic. Sometimes the traffic is so heavy that those who ply the road spend hours in the 'artificial gridlock'. In November 2017, the government of Ghana relocated it to avoid such problems and also enable the completion of a redevelopment. Currently, the new market is highly attended by people from all parts of Ghana and even neighboring countries.

It is one of the country's largest maize-producing areas. On the market day, thousands of tonnes of maize are carted to different parts of the country, including Kumasi, Takoradi, Cape Coast, Obuasi, and Accra, among others. Niger, Burkina Faso and Mali also welcome loads of articulator trucks from the same market. Plantain, cassava, yams and large quantities of fruits and vegetables are also grown in large scale by farmers in the town and its surrounding villages.

== Infrastructure ==
It has a branch of Otuasekan Rural bank. Abofour has a police station with about ten officers.

The town is connected to the national power grid, driven by the main power line that carries electric power to the northern part of Ghana as well as Burkina Faso.

Pipe-borne water is unavailable and water is drawn from groundwater.

== Geography ==
The town is about 45 km and about an hour's drive from Kumasi, the regional capital. It is located along the main Kumasi-Techiman highway, a first-class road that links the Southern and northern parts of the country and neighboring countries such as Burkina Faso, Mali, Niger and northern Togo.

The town is drained by the Ode and Opro rivers and their tributaries. Abofour hosts one of the largest forest reserves in Ghana, namely Afram Head Waters and the Opro forest reserves.

== Governance ==
The town is headed by the traditional ruler whose title is Nana Abofohene. The Abofohene is Nana Ofobiri Ti( II), an ex-serviceman and former chief of staff under the N.R.C government of General Kutu Acheampong. Second in command is the Kontihene, Nana Osei Darko. Nana Kofi Agyeman is the Nifahene, Nana Owusu Amponsah is the Akwamuhene, and Nana Kwaku Owusu Antwi is the Benkumhene.

Traditionally this town is part of the Offinso Traditional area, which is traditionally ruled by Offinsomanhene Nana Wiafe Akenten (III).

The town has four electoral areas (councils), each headed by an assembly member. Assembly members are elected through popular elections, and serve a minimum of one four-year term. The electoral areas are Abofour Junction, represented by Anthony Ohene-Peprah. The other areas are Buasi-Asuboi, Wawasee, and Dumasua.

== Notables ==
Notable citizens include:

- Hon. Dr. Isaac Yaw Opoku is the current member of parliament. He is serving his 2nd term in office.
- Ben Abdallah Banda, former member of parliament for Offinso South Constituency
- Barbara Serwaa Asamoah, current deputy general secretary of National Democratic Congress (NDC) and former deputy minister for lands and forestry in Mills-Mahama administration.
- Salifu Ibrahim, Ghanaian footballer

== Health care ==
The town has a health centre which is located along the main Kumasi-Techiman Highway, and it is currently under the care of a medical superintendent. The centre handles emergency cases, maternity care, and general outpatient services.
