= Serwaa Amihere =

Ghanaian journalist (born 1990)

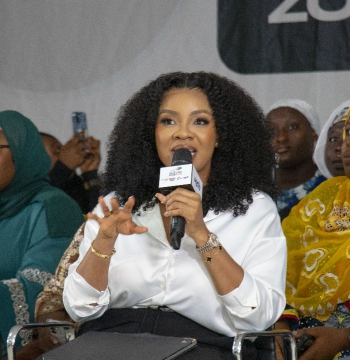
- Serwaa Amihere - GhOne Journalist
- Born: March 8, 1990 (age 36)
- Citizenship: Ghanaian
- Education: Yaa Asantewaa Secondary School Methodist University College Ghana Ghana Institute of Management and Public Administration
- Occupations: News anchor, broadcaster, media personality, Legal Practitioner
- Employer: EIB Network AMOR Contraceptive Flora Tissues
- Organizations: GHOne TV; Serwaaamihere Foundation
- Children: 1
- Parents: Mr Frank Yeboah (father); Mrs Lydia Tetteh (mother)
- Awards: 2018 Most Influential Young Media Personality at Advance Media - (Nominated); 2018 Best TV Female News Anchor at Radio and Television Personality Awards; 2018 Producer of the Year at Golden Movie Awards; 2019 & 2020 Female TV Newscaster of the Year at Radio and Television Personality Awards; 2020 TV Personality of the Year at National Communication Awards

Serwaa Amihere (born 8 March 1990) is a Ghanaian broadcast journalist, news presenter who currently works with GHOne TV, and attorney. She is the host of Cheers, a weekend sports show telecast on GHOne TV.

Serwaa started her career as the producer of the award-winning current affairs show, State of Affairs hosted by Nana Aba Anamoah. She won the Television Female Newscaster of the Year Award at the 2018 Radio and Television Personality Awards.

She was called to the Ghana Bar Association in October 2025, becoming a Barrister and Solicitor of the Supreme Court of Ghana.

== Early life and education ==
Serwaa was born on 8th March 1990 as the first born to Frank Yeboah and Lydia Tetteh. She attended Yaa Asantewaa Secondary School and proceeded to study Banking and Finance at the Methodist University College, Ghana.

She also graduated with Second-Class Upper Honours from the Law Faculty of the Ghana Institute of Management and Public Administration (GIMPA) in Ghana.

== Career ==
Serwaa is a news anchor on GHOne TV and the first Ghanaian to win RTP Awards' Best TV Newscaster of the Year three consecutive times. She is the first brand ambassador of AMOR Contraceptive. She is an ambassador of Flora Tissues and also the C.E.O of Oh My Hair Beauty Parlor and Office and Co.

In 2025, she opened a new building for Oh My Hair and Office and Co with her sister, Mavis, popularly known as Mami. The structure at East Legon, Accra, serves women with their modern day beauty needs.

On 10th October, 2025, she announced on her social media accounts that she had graduated from the Ghana School of Law and had qualified as an attorney. The announcement attracted a massive public attention and traction, as her legal education had largely remained private. She accompanied the announcement with photographs of herself in legal regalia.

== Awards and recognition ==
Year	Event	Prize	Result
2018	RTP Awards	Best TV Female News Anchor	Won
2018	Avance Media	Most Influential Young Media Personality	Nominated
2018	Golden Movie Awards	Producer of the Year	Won
2019	RTP Awards	Female TV Newscaster of the Year	Won
2020	RTP Awards	Female TV Newscaster of the Year	Won
2020	National Communication Awards	TV Personality of the Year	Won

== Controversy ==
In April 2024, Amihere issued an apology after an intimate video of her went viral on social media.

== Personal life ==
Serwaa Amihere is also known for her charitable endeavors. She launched Serwaa Amihere Foundation, a charity/nonprofit organization to make impact in the lives of people.

Serwaa Amihere is currently single but a mother to a daughter named Naana.
