= Sadick =

Sadick is a given name and a surname. Notable people with the name include:

Given name:

- Sadick Abubakar (born 1998), Ghanaian professional footballer
- Sadick Adams (born 1990), Ghanaian professional footballer

Surname:

- Lena Sadick, former Hong Kong international lawn and indoor bowler
- Maltiti Sayida Sadick, Ghanaian journalist, media personality and news anchor
- Mujaid Sadick (born 2000), aka Mujaid, Spanish professional footballer
- Sydney Sadick (born 1994), American on-air fashion and entertainment commentator

== See also ==
- Ammar Mosque and Osman Ramju Sadick Islamic Centre, mosque and Islamic centre in Wan Chai, Hong Kong
