= Maltiti Sayida Sadick =

Ghanaian journalist

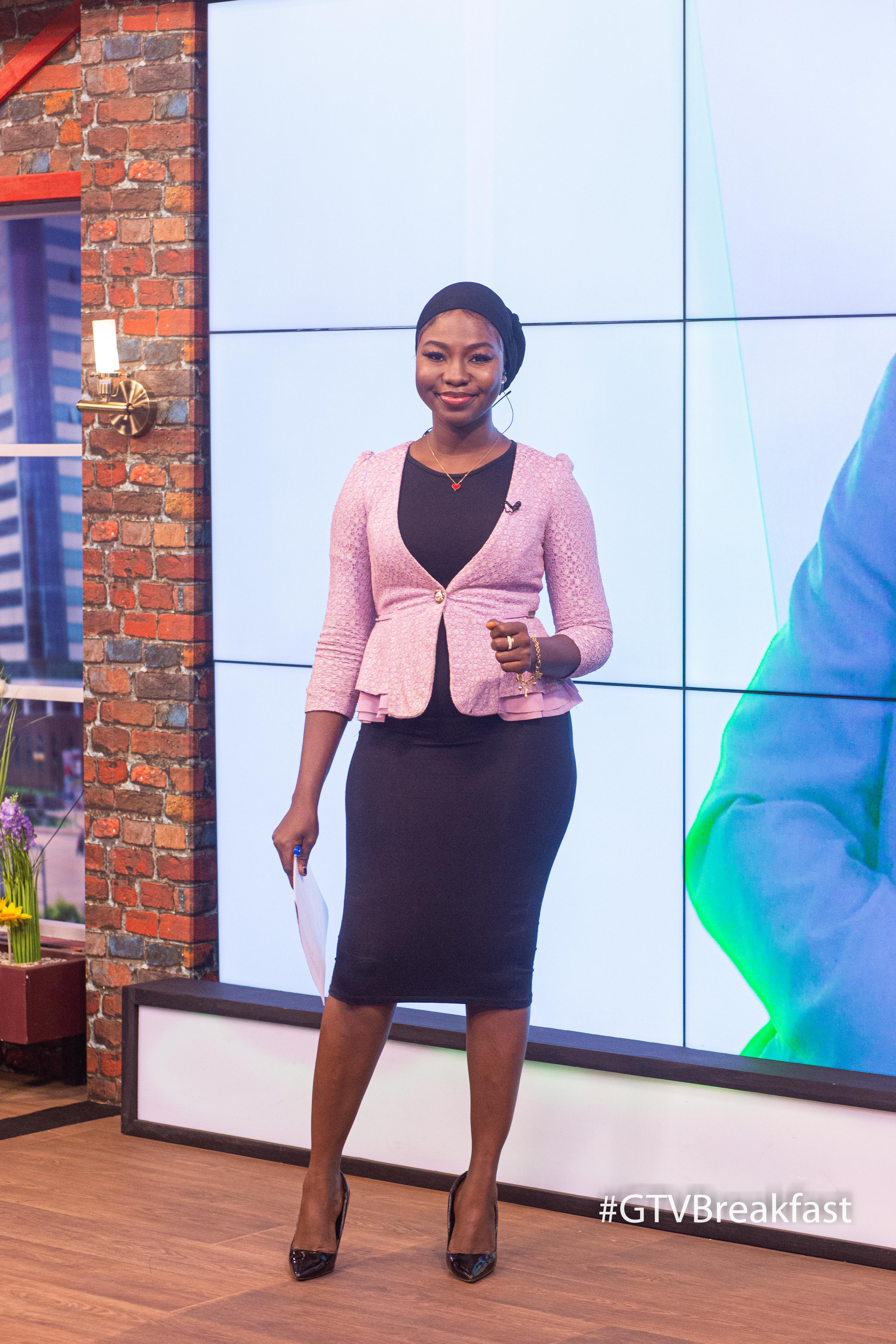
- Education: Ghana Institute of Journalism
- Occupations: News anchor, Broadcaster, Journalist
- Known for: Maltiti Care International

Maltiti Sayida Sadick is a Ghanaian journalist, media personality and news anchor. In 2019, she was awarded the Most Promising Journalist by the Ghana Journalists Association. She also received a Media Star award by Hyperlink Media Awards in 2019. She was a member of the #FixTheCountry movement organized by the Economic Fighters League.

== Education ==
She attained a Bachelor of Arts (BA) Degree in Mass Communication Studies from the Ghana Institute of Journalism (GIJ).

== Career ==
She worked at Sagani TV. She is a broadcast journalist at EIB Network. In 2021, she was selected for the 2021 Mandela Washington Fellowship to participate in a professional development training in leadership in Civic engagement. She was among 32 Ghanaians chosen by YALI who applied for the flagship program.

== Awards and honors ==
She was the first runner up of 'The Next TV Star'.

She won the Most Promising Journalist at the first edition of the Ghana Journalists Association (GJA) awards in the Northern region in 2019.

She was also awarded a Media Star medal by Hyperlink Media Awards in 2019 for her news report on health and education in the Northern Region of Ghana.

== Foundation ==
Her foundation called Maltiti Care International is claimed to provide free surgeries for women with fistula in the Northern part of Ghana. The foundation partnered with the National Youth Authority to visit senior high schools in the rural areas of Northern region to empower young girls.
