= Umaru Sanda Amadu =

Ghanaian broadcast journalist (born 1987)

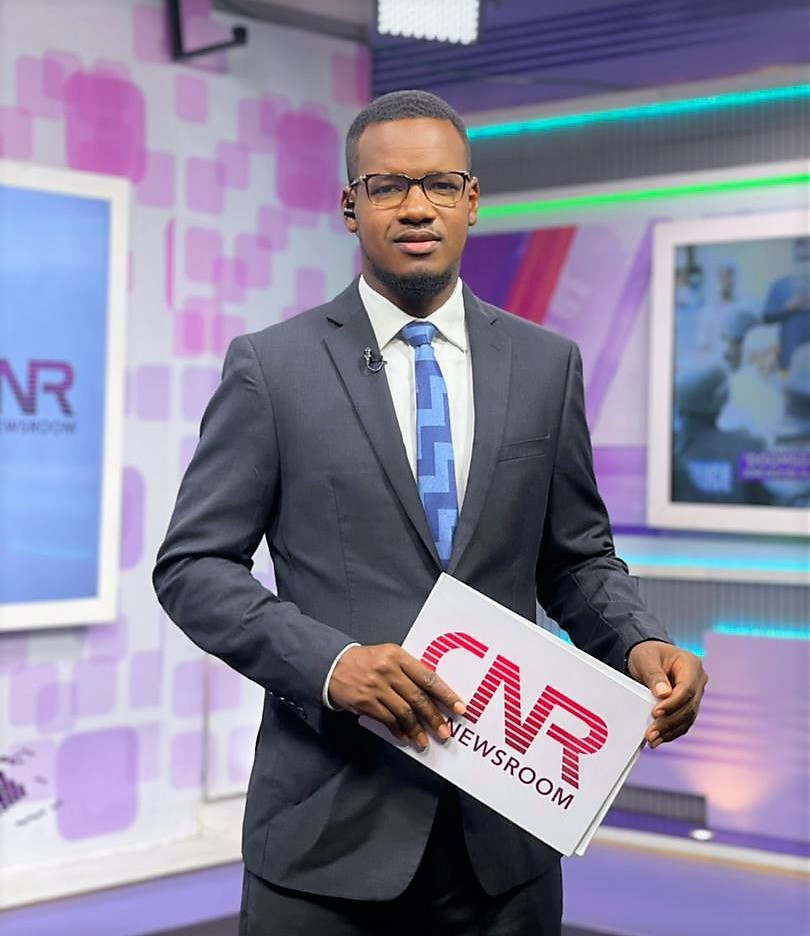
- Umaru Sanda Amadu at Citi TV
- Born: Umaru Sanda Amdu; 2 February 1987; Accra, Ghana
- Other name: Cowboy Journalist
- Education: Ghana Institute of Journalism
- Occupation: Broadcast journalist
- Years active: 2010–present
- Known for: Citi FM (97.3) (radio) Ghana

Umaru Sanda Amadu is a Ghanaian media personality and broadcast journalist on Citi FM and ChannelOne TV [formerly Citi TV] conglomerate. He anchors news bulletins including Eyewitness News on radio and CitiNewsroom on TV. He also hosts the weekly FaceToFace personality-driven discussion show on Citi TV. Umaru Sanda is known in the media fraternity as the 'cowboy journalist'; taking inspiration from his days as a herdsman before joining the media profession. He is the youngest of seven children – three brothers and four sisters – who did not have formal education.

== Education ==
Umaru Sanda Amadu completed his basic education at the Asutsuare Junction D/A Basic School located in the Shai Osudoku District then Dangme West of the Greater Accra Region. Upon graduating in 2003, he was awarded a district scholarship to pursue high school education at Tema Secondary School.

He then proceeded to the Ghana Institute of Journalism for a diploma in communication studies (2008–2010) after completing Tema Secondary School in 2006. Umaru later furthered his study again with Ghana Institute of Journalism (GIJ) where he obtained a Bachelor of Arts Communications [Journalism option] in a top-up program between 2012 and 2014.

== Career ==
Umaru Sanda started journalism as an intern in the newsrooms of Ashiaman-based Sena Radio and Accra-based TV3. In 2010 he joined Citi FM as a national service personnel where he has served in various roles – producer of Eyewitness News, Citi Breakfast Show, Citi Prime News, and the weekend news analysis show The Big Issue, which he later served as an anchor.

The 'cowboy journalist' also wrote for the now defunct The Globe newspaper which was owned by the same organization, as well as its online portal citifmonline.com and citinewsroom.com.

He anchors major news bulletins including Eyewitness News on radio and CitiNewsroom on TV. He also anchors the weekly personality-driven discussion show FaceToFace on Citi TV.

He was crowned the winner of the Citi TV/Citi FM's in-house writing competition instituted by the management. It was on any topic of choice on the Citi TV/Citi FM's Heritage Month held in March, 2023.

== Awards ==
- He has several awards to his name listed below:

Media awards
Year	Award	Result
2012	Radio for Peace Building – Africa award held in Kigali Rwanda for his documentary titled The Fulani Revealed.	Won
2012	Road Safety Awards, Ghana's National Roads Safety Commission	Won
	Best SDG Reporter 17th Ghana Journalists Association Awards	Won
2014	Water, Sanitation and Hygiene (WASH) Media Awards organized by the Stockholm International Water Institute SIWI of Sweden and the Water Supply and Sanitation Collaborative Council (WSSCC)	Won
2017	Radio Personality of the Year at the Muslim Achievers Awards 2017	Won
2023	State honor for the fight against COVID-19	Won
