= Grace Alache Jerry =

Nigerian disability-activist, human rights advocate, a musician and beauty pageant

- Citizenship: Nigerian
- Occupations: Human Right activists, beauty pageant, musician
- Awards: Miss Wheelchair Nigeria

Grace Alache Jerry is a Nigerian disability-activist, human rights advocate, a musician and beauty pageant queen who was awarded the Miss Wheelchair Nigeria. Jerry is the executive director of Inclusive Friends Association. She has performed in concerts within and outside Nigeria. She is a 2015 Mandela Washington Fellow and was honored by President Barack Obama.
