= Nathan Kwabena Adisi =

Ghanaian media personality

Bola Ray
- Born: Nathan Kwabena Anokye Adisi; 1 March 1977 (age 49)
- Education: African Child School; Accra Academy; University of Ghana Business School; Central University; Università Cattolica del Sacro Cuore
- Occupations: Media personality Entrepreneur
- Years active: 2003 – present
- Known for: Music Music, Star Chat
- Title: Chief Executive Officer, EIB Network Group
- Spouse: Dorcas Adisi
- Children: 3

Nathan Kwabena Anokye Adisi (born 1 March 1977), popularly known as Bola Ray, is a Ghanaian radio and television personality and entrepreneur who is the CEO of media conglomerate, EIB Network Group since 2014 and also CEO of Empire Entertainment.

== Early life and education ==
Nathan Kwabena Anokye Adisi was born on 1 March 1977 to Gladys Adisi. Adisi attended African Child School for his basic elementary and Accra Academy for his secondary school education. He then studied at the University of Ghana Business School, where he obtained a Diploma in Public Administration and he pursued a Bachelor of Science Degree in Business Administration from Central University. In 2015, he graduated with an MBA in Global Business and Sustainability from the Catholic University of the Sacred Heart of Milan (ALTIS) and the Catholic Institute of Business and Technology (CIBT).

== Career ==
He joined Top Radio after Radio Universe, where he hosted Top City Jam while still a student at the University of Ghana. He was the first African and Ghanaian to host Top of the Pops on BBC Radio. In 2003, he moved to Joy FM to become the host of the Drive Time Show for 11 years, leading it to be recognized as the most influential drive time show on radio in Ghana. He was also co-host of live musical show Music Music on TV3 during this period. He appeared on TV3 on Saturday evenings with co-host Stacy Amoateng for this programme, which featured live performances by leading Ghanaian musical artistes with their hit songs.

He co-founded and became EIB Network Group chief executive officer with the purchase of GHOne Television and some Ghanaian radio stations. He was the first host of the celebrity interview programme Starr Chat on Starr FM, an EIB Network Group owned radio station. On this programme, he has hosted Ghanaian political figures, businessmen, clergy, foreign ambassadors to Ghana, and academics. He went on to become the presenter of Revealed With Bola Ray, a TV programme that focuses on luxury and lifestyle and which airs on GHOne Television. In 2025, Nathan Kwabena Anokye Adisi, together with renowned actress, Joselyn Dumas, was named as a Brand Ambassador for GoldBod Jewellery, a subsidiary of the Ghana Gold Board.

== Gold Board Ambassador ==
Bola Ray was on Tuesday, October 28, 2025 appointed as brand ambassador for the newly founded only gold purchased board, Ghana Gold board jewellery.

== Personal life ==
Bola Ray is married to Dorcas Adisi and together they have two sons, Pharrel and Marcel, and a daughter.

== Awards ==
- 2015 - Best Radio Personality (RTP Awards)
- 2015 - Radio Late Afternoon Show Host of the Year (RTP Awards)
- 2015 - Most Influential Young Ghanaian - 2nd Most Influential Personality (Avance Media)
- 2015 - GUBA Media and Entertainment Award (GUBA Awards)
- 2016 - Man of the Year – Communication (Exclusive Men of the Year (EMY) Awards)
- 2017- Individual Philanthropist of the year (NPF-G)
- 2018- Most Influential Entertainment Personality of the year(Shine Publications)
- Radio and Television Personalities Awards RTP Personality Of The Decade 2010–2020.
- 2019 - Duke of Edinburgh award
- 2021 - 1st Vice-Chair Of India-Africa Trade Council
