= Etse Sikanku =

Ghanaian political scientist

Godwin Etse Sikanku
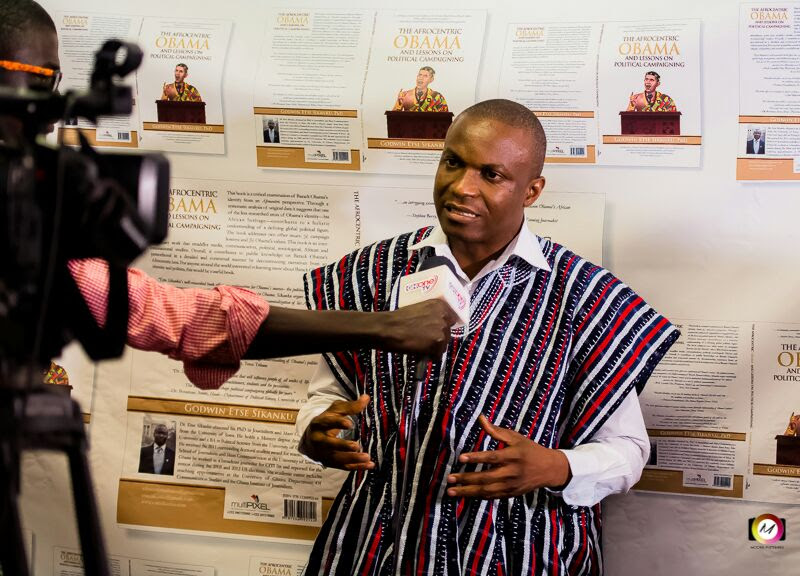
- Education: University of Ghana (BA); University of Iowa (PhD)
- Employer: Ghana Institute of Journalism
- Known for: Political Communication
- Title: Dean at the School of Journalism, University of Media Arts and Communication.

Godwin Etse Sikanku is a Ghanaian political scientist, author, lecturer and Dean at the School of Journalism, University of Media, Arts and Communication. He is best known for his book on Barack Obama, titled The Afrocentric Obama and lessons on political campaigns.

Sikanku received a Bachelor of Arts in political science and sociology from the University of Ghana. He then attended the University of Iowa, receiving a master's degree in journalism and communication studies from the University of Iowa, as well as a Doctor of Philosophy in journalism and mass communication.

== Awards ==
- Outstanding reportage on developmental issues, United Nations Population Fund (UNFPA) Media Awards, Accra-Ghana, 2006
- Society of Professional Journalist award for top college newspaper, Iowa State Daily staff, 2008
- Outstanding Teaching Assistant, University of Iowa Office of Residential Life, 2009
- John F. Murray award for outstanding doctoral student (research), University of Iowa School of Journalism and Mass Communication, 2011
- Leon Barnes Scholarship, University of Iowa School of Journalism and Mass Communication, 2011
- Best research paper for the Freedom of Expression and Political Communication Interest Group at the upcoming 2023 Western States Communication Association conference in Arizona, USA.
