= Voice Factory =

Reality show

Voice Factory is a reality show by Citi FM and Citi TV in Ghana, that initially started in 2009 on Citi FM and in 2019 the fourth edition of the reality show was telecast live on the television. The reality show is a singing competition, that brings together a number of contestants (singers, rappers and gospel acts) to compete for an ultimate price. Contestants are usually between the ages of 18 and 24.

Voice Factory aims to transform the musical careers of selected contestants, from various part of the country. These contestants will showcase and compete against each other for the ultimate prize and a chance to become music star. Contestants will embark on a thrilling journey, navigating through 12 weeks of themed competitions such as Reggae/Dancehall, Rhythm and Blues, Soul, Pop, Afro-pop/Hiplife, Highlife, Inspirational Gospel, Duet (Team-Up), Face-Offs, Acoustic Night, and Artiste Night.

Duration: contestants usually go through 12 themed weeks on various music genres.

== Winners ==
| Name | Season | Year | Link | Status |
|---|---|---|---|---|
| Cielo Bee | 5 | 2023 | | Won |
| Genevieve Antwi-Nuamah (Araba) | 4 | 2019 | | Won |
| Natasha Odoi | 3 | 2016 | | Won |
| Melody Wilson | 2 | 2010 | | Won |
| Fritz Hehetror | 1 | 2009 | | Won |
