= Eunice Attakora-Manu =

Ghanaian journalist

Eunice Akoto Mansa Attakora-Manu
- Education: Ghana Institute of Journalism
- Occupations: News anchor, broadcaster, journalist

Eunice Akoto Mansa Attakora-Manu is a Ghanaian broadcast journalist, news presenter and producer who currently hosts Women Affairs on Pure FM.

== Early life ==
She was born in Kumasi to Nana Attakorah Manu, Chief of Brengo near Asante Mampong, and to Madam Vida Mensah. She attended Primary School at Brengo, and progressed to St Paul RC JSS, Mampong, and later switched to St Anne's Anglican JSS Kumasi before entering St Monica's SHS Mampong.

== Education ==
She attended the Ghana Institute of Management and Public Administration (GIMPA), where she obtained a certificate of advanced public relations in 2008; it was followed up with a certificate in broadcast journalism in 2006 at the Ghana Institute of Journalism. She has subsequent certificates in advertising, communication and public relations.

Between 1998 and 2000, she was an intern at Abura Printing Press Kumasi, Publishers of The Pioneer, Ghana's first independent newspaper. She would become its first full-time reporter.

She became the first female regular panelist on Daybreak Kapital, a current affairs program on Kapital Radio - a Kumasi-based radio station - somewhere between 2001 and 2003, as well as the first female regular panelist on Maakye (A popular current affairs program on Fontomfrom TV).

== Career ==
She was formerly the producer of Kwame Adinkra, who is the host of Abusua Nkommo on Kumasi-based Abusua FM which is a subsidiary of the EIB Network. She was claimed to have been retrenched by the management in less than 2 years due to a "restructuring exercise". Award-winning Morning Show host, Kwame Adinkra had described his former Producer, Akoto Mansa Attakora-Manu as number one and the best thing to have ever happened to him as far as the show is concerned.

She is currently working at Pure FM, a Kumasi-based radio station and a subsidiary of the Angel Broadcasting Network (ABN Ghana) which has Angel FM as its mother station. She is the producer of Kwame Adinkra at the radio station after he moved to Pure FM. Due to her experience in the industry, there are numerous of praise showered on her by former and currents colleagues. Notably the appraisers are Kwame Adinkra, who describe her number one and the best thing to happen to him since the show climax.

== Philanthropy ==
She is the CEO of an NGO called the Vida Victoria Foundation. They donated an amount of 11,000 cedis towards the surgery of a girl who got burnt and her body injured in Wa in the Upper West region. The money was claimed to have been raised through her Facebook page Her foundation donated items to the inmates of Central Destitute Infirmary at Bekwai-Amoafo in the Bekwai Municipality of the Ashanti Region.

She and her colleagues presented some amount to a student to aid her fund her education in a teacher training college.
