= Diana Ngon =

Ghanaian journalist

- Occupations: News anchor, Broadcaster, Journalist
- Known for: News Anchor

Diana Ngon is a Ghanaian journalist, communications and media personality. Diana is currently the Northern Regional correspondent of Citi News. She won the 'Best Sensitive Peace Reporter' at the Ghana Journalists Association Awards of the Northern region of Ghana.

== Career in journalism ==
Diana is currently at Citi FM and Citi TV as an author and journalist in Tamale in the Northern region of Ghana. She reported on the 'Anufos and Konkombas set up peace committee.

== Awards ==
In September 2019, Diana won the 'Best Sensitive Peace Reporter' at the first edition of the Ghana Journalists Association Awards in the Northern region.

== Notable works ==
Diana has written articles such as:

- How COVID-19 has unsettled the 'holy' month of Ramadan.
- Sand winning activities threatening White Volta.
- School Feeding Program; Pupils Study Hungry Over Poor Food Quality.
