= Stacy Amoateng =

Ghanaian media personality and actress

- Citizenship: Ghanaian
- Occupations: TV Presenter/Producer; Actress; Content creator; Media Consultant; Events Consultant; Philanthropist
- Years active: 1999 – present
- Known for: Restoration with Stacy talk show , Music Music entertainment show, Taxi Driver, I sing of a well, Incomplete, cross my heart
- Spouse: Daniel Kofi Amoateng
- Children: Calista Meusique Amoateng, Beyonce Afia Dankwah Amoateng, Josiah Ian Amoateng
- Awards: RTP awards TV program of the year, Shine awards TV program of the year

Stacy Amoateng (Anastasia Manuela Amoateng) is television presenter/producer, media consultant, philanthropist and actress from Ghana. She founded a charitable organisation to support women and children in need and has been recognised for her work via a Ghana Peace Award.

== Career ==
Amoateng started her television career in 2000 acting in television series Taxi Driver. In 2002, she hosted talk show Talk Ghana on Tv3. She co-hosted Music Music on TV3 Ghana in 2002 with Bola Ray and resigned in 2012. Amoateng has acted in movies such as I Sing of a Well, Incomplete, Consequences, and Cross my Heart. She also hosted In Touch Africa and In Vogue.

Amoateng is the CEO of Platinum Networks, which produces a television series she hosts, Restoration. She is the executive director of Emklan Media, a content management, and multimedia production firm.

She is the founder of Showbiz Honours, an awards scheme for celebrities who give back to the society, and The Restoration With Stacy Foundation, which gives focus to empowering women and young girls with a campaign called The Luv Project. The Luv Project gives support to women and girls going through various forms of abuse. She raised Ghc 40,000.00 for plastic surgery for a woman whose partner poured acid on her. She supports needy children in school, gives accommodation to single mothers and counsels young girls on how to be empowered and live their dreams to the fullest. She does these by touring schools and having sessions with the students.

=== Recognition ===
- Humanitarian Award 2019- World Philanthropist Forum
- TV program of the year 2019- African Gospel Awards
- Personality of the year 2018 - RTP Awards
- Female Presenter of the year 2018 - RTP Awards
- TV Program of the year (Restoration with Stacy) - RTP Awards
- TV Presenter of the year 2018 - Shine Awards
- TV Program of the year 2018 - Shine Awards
- GOLD Award for Media Excellence 2018 - Foklex Media Awards
- Humanitarian Service Laureate 2017 - Ghana Peace Awards
- TV Developmental show of the year 2017- RTP Awards
- Ultimate Woman 2016 for her excellence in Media and Humanitarian courses.
- Most Entertaining Female Presenter 2016 - RTP Awards
- Most Entertaining Female Presenter 2015 - RTP Awards
- Honorary Degree in Media Relations 2015 - Achievers university College, Spain
- Most Entertaining Female Presenter 2011 - RTP Awards
- Royalty of Sunyani for her Excellence in Media.
- Ghana Peace Awards Humanitarian Service Laureate, 2017
- Winner, “TV Development Show Host Of The Year 2016-2017', RTP Awards, 2017
- RTP Personality awards 2018
- RTP Personality Of The Year 2019–2020.
- Radio and Television Personalities Awards TV Development Show Host Of The Year 2019–2020.

== Personal life ==
On 28 May 2005 Stacy married broadcaster, creative director and musician Daniel Kofi Amoateng (Quophi Okyeame). They have three children, two girls, Calista Meusique Amoateng, Beyonce Afia Dankwah Amoateng and a boy, Josiah Ian Kobby Amoateng.
