= Isaac Kaledzi =

Ghanaian entrepreneur, journalist (born 1985)

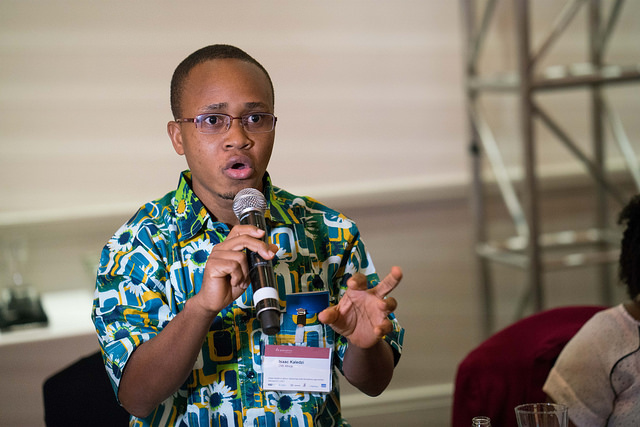
- Isaac Kaledzi speaking at an event in Cape Town, South Africa
- Born: Isaac Dzidefo Yao Kaledzi; 26 December 1985; Accra, Ghana
- Other name: Dzidefo Yao
- Citizenship: Ghana
- Education: University of Ghana
- Alma mater: Nungua Senior High School
- Occupations: Entrepreneur, Broadcast journalist, Radio personality, Blogger
- Years active: 2004-present
- Known for: Radio Univers (Radio) Ghana, Citi FM (97.3) (Radio) Ghana., Radio XYZ 93.1 (Radio) Ghana., Starr FM Ghana, Deutsche Welle Bonn, Germany, and Africa Feeds Media Limited, Ghana
- Spouse: Nana Ama Akyiaa Kaledzi
- Children: 1
- Parents: George Dodzidenu (father); Vida Binda (mother)
- Website: www.africafeeds.com

Isaac Kaledzi (born December 26, 1985) is a Ghanaian entrepreneur, broadcast journalist, radio personality, and blogger who is the founder and CEO of Africa Feeds Media Limited, a Pan-African media brand. He currently works for Deutsche Welle as their African correspondent while being based in Ghana. He previously worked for the Ghanaian radio station Starr FM Ghana as an editor.

== Early life ==
Kaledzi began his early education at Teshie Estate Preparatory School at Teshie-Nungua Estate, in Accra. He continued at the Nungua Senior High School, where he started his high school education in 2001. In 2004 he took a course in journalism at the Radio Broadcasting Development Foundation (RABODEF) after his high school education, shortly after that he proceeded to the University of Ghana, Legon where he studied philosophy and Russian language, graduating in 2008.

== Personal life ==
Kaledzi was born in Ghana's biggest city and capital, Accra, to George Dodzidenu and Vida Binda (all nationals of the Republic of Ghana). His hometown is Denu in the Volta Region of Ghana.

Kaledzi married his wife, Nana Ama Akyiaa Kaledzi, in December 2015. Nana Ama is a fashion entrepreneur and owner of "Akyia Collection", a fashion accessories business headquartered in Ghana.

Kaledzi and Nana Ama have two children, a daughter called Gabriella Esenam Afi Kaledzi and a son called Eliel Elorm Yao Kaledzi.

== Journalism career ==
Kaledzi started his journalism career at Radio Univers, a campus radio station at the University of Ghana. He worked with the campus-based radio station between 2004 and 2010. He later worked with Citi (97.3 FM) as a producer of the Citi Breakfast Show and as a broadcast journalist between 2010 and 2012. Kaledzi then joined Radio XYZ (93.1FM) as head of production and deputy head of news, where he worked between 2012 and 2014. He also joined Accra-based Starr FM in 2014 and left the station in 2018. In 2011, Kaledzi was employed by Deutsche Welle in Germany as an African correspondent based in Ghana.

== Awards ==
Kaledzi was awarded the Best Rural Reporter in Ghana in 2012 by the Ghana Journalists Association.
