= Zone Three 6 =

Ghanaian 24-hour music channel

Zone three 6
- Country: Ghana
- Broadcast area: Ghana
- Headquarters: Accra, Ghana

Programming
- Picture format: 1080i (HDTV) 720i

Ownership
- Owner: Zone Three 6 Network Limited

History
- Launched: 2013

Links
- Website: http://www.zonethree6.tv

Zone three 6 is a Ghanaian 24-hour music channel from Zone Three 6 Network Limited. They are focused on curating music and engaging youth in social conversation. They are a multi-genre, multi-platform network that offers breaking music news, videos, artist interviews, exclusive performances, and original programming on Ghanaian Digital platforms.

== History ==
Zone three 6 aired its first episode on 13 October 2013 on GHOne TV, as a 36 minutes edutainment television show.

They champion the youth, nurture their creativity and stand up for the issues they believe in by using the music the youth produces.

Zone Three 6 has represented Ghana on a couple of platforms like Channel O Music Video Awards 2014, MTV Africa Music Awards 15 & 16, IARA 2017, One Africa Music Festival 2017 and 18 in the United Kingdom, New York and Dubai.

In June 2021, Zone three 6 started airing as a free to air satelitte channel which is available to users in Ghana, parts of West Africa, Asia and the Middle East.

== Awards ==
- Best Campus TV Show in 2015
