= Nana Ama Agyemang Asante =

Ghanaian journalist

- Occupations: Journalist & Writer

Nana Ama Agyemang Asante is a Ghanaian journalist, editor and writer. Beginning in 2012 she worked as deputy online editor of Citi FM's web portal. She also co-hosts the “Citi Breakfast Show” at the Accra-based radio station Citi FM, together with Bernard Avle.

== Biography ==
As a journalist covering politics, gender and business, Nana Ama Agyemang Asante has been speaking truth to power and holding governments accountable for years. She has provided a feminist perspective on national issues and debates on radio. Her views on feminism has made her a target for anti-feminists in Ghana. That’s not stopped her from using her platforms to fight for the oppressed. Nana Ama is a fellow at the Reuters Institute for the Study of Journalism at the University of Oxford, and the National Endowment for Democracy in Washington, D.C. Her most recent work was the Ghanaian Women Expert project, which tracked the number of women experts interviewed in Ghanaian media.

== Education ==
She completed her tertiary education at the University of Cape Coast where she studied Sociology and Economics.

== Career ==
Nana Ama Agyemang Asante started her journalistic career in 2006 as a broadcast journalist with the radio station Joy FM. From 2011 to 2012 she worked with Journalists for Human Rights (JHR), an NGO which was founded in Canada, where she served as the country director for Ghana.

The radio program “Citi Breakfast Show” (#CitiCBS), in which Nana Ama Agyemang Asante regularly participates, was awarded with a number of prizes over the years.

M24, an African entertainment network, named Nana Ama Agyemang Asante “Radio Personality of the Year” in 2015 for her persistent efforts in speaking truth to power.

In 2017, she was awarded a “Reagan-Fascell Democracy Fellowship” by the National Endowment for Democracy (NED), which allowed her to spend several months in Washington, D.C. to compile a report on the possibilities of the media to louden Ghanaian women's voices in the public sphere.
