= Bernard Avle =

Ghanaian media personality

Bernard Koku Avle
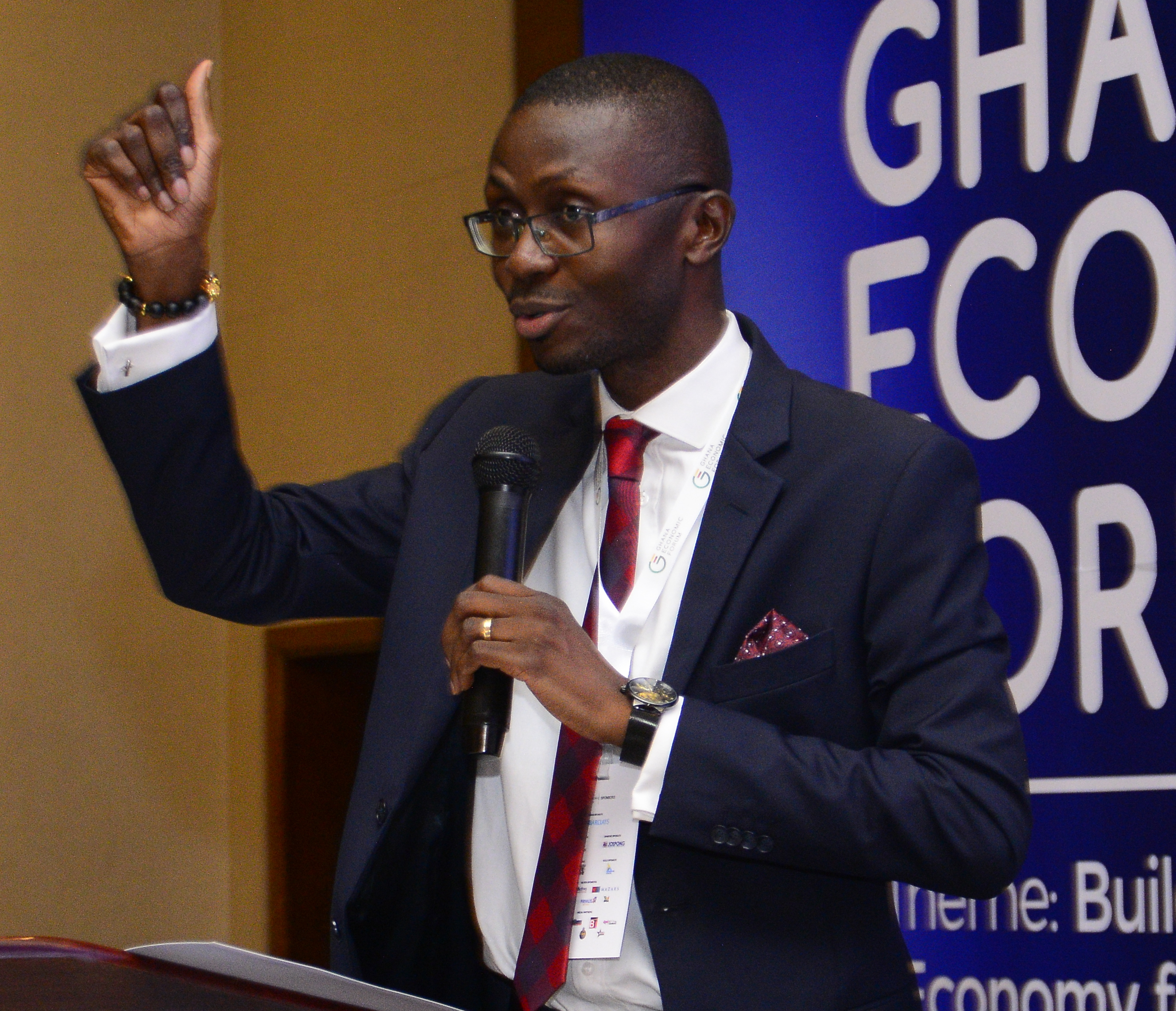
- Born: May 20, 1981 (age 45)
- Other name: Ben Koku
- Citizenship: Ghanaian
- Education: University of Ghana (B.A.); Warwick Business School (MBA)
- Occupation: Broadcaster
- Employer: Omni Media
- Organization: Citi FM
- Spouse: Justine Avle
- Children: 5

Bernard Koku Avle also known as Bernardino Koku Avle (born 20 May 1981) is a Ghanaian media personality, broadcast journalist, public speaker. He is the current host of Citi FM's morning show The Citi Breakfast Show and the host of the Point Of View Show on ChannelOne. He also moderates and facilitates local and international conferences occasionally.

== Education ==
He completed his basic education at the University of Ghana Primary School Legon. He went to the Presbyterian Boys' Senior High School for his secondary education. He then got admission into the University of Ghana, Legon where he obtained a Bachelors of Arts in Economics with distinction. He further went to the Warwick Business School in the UK as a Chevening Scholar to obtain his MBA in Marketing.

== Career ==
He is a broadcast journalist and also General manager at Citi FM, one of Ghana's most influential radio stations. He is also a member of the governing council of the Global Marketing Network in Ghana. As a founding director of iJourno Africa, he trains and creates opportunities for participants to practice citizen journalism and equip them with tools to cover local issues. He hosts many programs on Channel One TV and Citi FM notably The Point of View and other series such as EdTech Mondays a partnership program supported by Mastercard Foundation and MEST Africa .

Galamsey

In 2017, Bernard Avle together with Citi Fm launched a campaign against illegal small scale mining also known as Galamsey which has destroyed Ghana's water bodies over the years. The Ghana Chamber of Mines gave his show an excellence award for the work he did for Galamsey. In May 2020, Bernard Avle expressed worry at the number of people permitted by the Ministry of Information to address the public in their regular press briefings.

== Personal life ==
Bernard Avle was married to the late Justine Avle with four children. The couple tied the knot in 2011.

== Awards ==
Here are some awards his shows have won:

Year	Nominee / work	Award	Result
2015	Citi Breakfast Show	Chartered Institute of Marketing Ghana (CIMG) Radio Programme of the Year	Won
2013	Citi Breakfast Show	Chartered Institute of Marketing Ghana (CIMG) Radio Programme of the Year	Won
2007	Citi Breakfast Show	BBC Africa Radio Awards Interactive/Talk Show of the Year	Won
2018	Bernard Avle	Ghana Journalists Association (Journalist of The Year – 2017)	Won
2018	Citi Breakfast Show	Ghana Journalists Association (Best Radio Morning Show – 2017)	Won
2019	Citi Breakfast Show	Ghana Journalists Association (Best Radio Morning Show – 2018)	Won
2019	Citi FM	Ghana Journalists Association (Best Radio Station (English) – 2018)	Won
