= Yaa Asantewaa Girls' Senior High School =

Location
- Ashanti Region; Kumasi; Ghana; 6.6966°N 1.6999°W

Information
- Type: Public high school
- Motto: Love and Service
- Denomination: Methodist, Presbyterian
- Founded: 1960; 66 years ago
- Founder: Kwame Nkrumah
- Status: active
- Sister school: Kumasi Wesley Girls SHS
- Oversight: Ministry of Education
- Headmistress: Mrs. Felicia Asamoah Danquah
- Gender: Girls
- Age: 14 to 18
- Enrollment: 4087
- Classes offered: General Science, Business, Home Economics, Agric Science, General Arts, Visual Arts
- Language: English
- Houses: 11
- Colours: Blue; White
- Alumni: Adehyeɛ
- Website: www.yagshs.edu.gh

Yaa Asantewaa Girls' Senior High School (YAGSHS) is a public high school for girls in Tanoso in the Atwima Mponua District in Kumasi in the Ashanti Region of Ghana.

== History ==
Yaa Asantewaa Girls' Senior High was established in 1951 by Ghana's first President Dr. Kwame Nkrumah. The school was founded in 1960 with funds from the Ghana Education Trust. Yaa Asantewaa is named after the Queen mother of Ejisu Yaa Asantewaa who led a war against the British Colonialists.

== Mission ==
To mould Resilient ladies fit for responsible adult life through holistic Education

== Vision ==
A learning centre of excellence for resilient girls in an ever-changing world

== Alliance ==
Yaa Asantewaa Senior High maintains an ongoing alliance with their boys' school, Prempeh College called Amanadehye.

== Notable alumnae ==
- Serwaa Amihere, broadcast journalist and news presenter
- Ellen Boakye, cardiologist for children
- Efya, singer and songwriter
- Efe Grace, singer and songwriter
- Nana Akosua Konadu, broadcaster, CEO and founder of Enak Consult
- Nana Yaa Serwaa Sarpong, media personality
