= Christopher Opoku =

Ghanaian sports journalist

- Born: Christopher Opoku; Glasgow, Scotland
- Other names: Christopher Columbus
- Occupation: Sports journalist

Christopher Opoku (1974–2017), also known as Christopher Columbus, was a Ghanaian sports journalist.

== Early life ==
Christopher was born to Mr. K.O. Opoku and Akose Ofori-Mensah in 1974. He attended Kwame Nkrumah University of Science and Technology (KNUST).

== Career ==
He started his career as a sports journalist at Luv fm, He also worked at Metro TV from 2009 to 2013, then he later moved to GTV and Citifm, Business and Financial Times, Happy Sports, worked with Footy-Ghana as Managing Editor, he did punditry for various stations like Multi TV and was the administrative director of Ghana League Club Association (GHALCA). Because of his command of the English language he covered the 2000 CAF Nations Cup and other tournaments.

== Achievements ==
He was named best commentator and sports journalist in 2008 and 2009.

== Death ==
He died at age forty-two of cancer. He left behind a spouse and three daughters.
