= Africa Feeds Media Limited =

Pan-African Media Group

Africa Feeds Media Limited is a pan-African media group in Ghana founded by Isaac Kaledzi. The company was officially launched in January 2017. In that same year, the group partnered with Germany's international broadcaster, Deutsche Welle (DW). As a result, a live TV feed from DW was broadcast on the news portal, africafeeds.com.

== News Portal ==
The news portal, africafeeds.com is a subsidiary of the Africa Feeds Media Group. The news portal which was launched in November 2016, provides its readers in Africa and beyond with the latest and relevant news about Africa and the world in general.
