= Kent Mensah =

Ghanaian online journalist, radio personality, and blogger

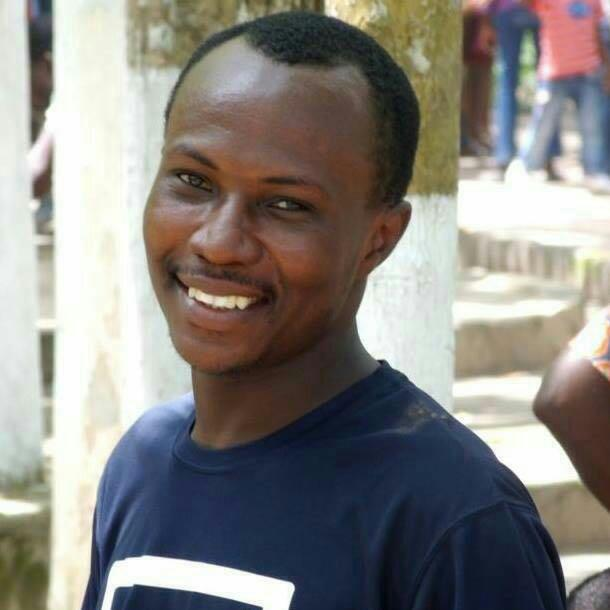
- Kent Mensah at Goal
- Born: Kent Mensah; Accra, Greater Accra Region, Ghana
- Education: University of Education, Winneba
- Occupation(s): Online journalist, radio personality, blogger
- Years active: 2009–present
- Known for: Citi FM, Goal.com Ghana, Aljazeera Africa, and Starr FM Ghana.

Kent Mensah is a Ghanaian online journalist, radio personality, and blogger who used to work for Starr FM Ghana and former Chief Editor of Goal Ghana.

== Early life ==
Mensah began his early education at Edentrom Preparatory School at Adabraka, in Accra. He continued at the St. Thomas Aquinas Senior High School where he started his high school education in 1998. After his high school education, he attended the University of Education, Winneba where he studied a Program in Communication Science. He continued his Education at Jayee Institute. Later he went to the International Institute of Journalism in Germany to study online journalism.

== Career ==
Mensah joined Citi FM as a reporter in 2012 and was made a chief editor of Goal Ghana after the launch in Ghana in July 2012. He later joined Starr FM Ghana after it was launched in 2014 by former Ghanaian Finance Minister, Kwabena Duffuor.

== Lets Goal Ghana campaign ==
In June 2014, Mensah joined key influencers online journalists which include Dentaa Amoateng, Tempa T, Ameyaw Debrah and Jeanette Kwakye to launch the Lets Goal Ghana! Me Firi Ghana's campaign which attracted so many people globally.

== Recognition ==
In 2010, Mensah was covered by the AfricaFiles Magazine in recognition to his "The Child Alert" program which was launched in 2007 to advocate for child rights in Ghana.
