= Georgina Ama Ankumah =

Ghanaian journalist

- Occupations: News anchor, Broadcaster, Journalist
- Known for: News Anchor

Georgina Ama Ankumah is a Ghanaian broadcast journalist and news presenter who currently works with GBC as the Ashanti Regional Correspondent. She is also the Ashanti Regional Secretary of the GJA.

== Career ==
Georgina is the Ashanti Regional Secretary of GJA and also trainer of IFJ.
