= Vivian Kai Lokko =

Ghanaian broadcast journalist

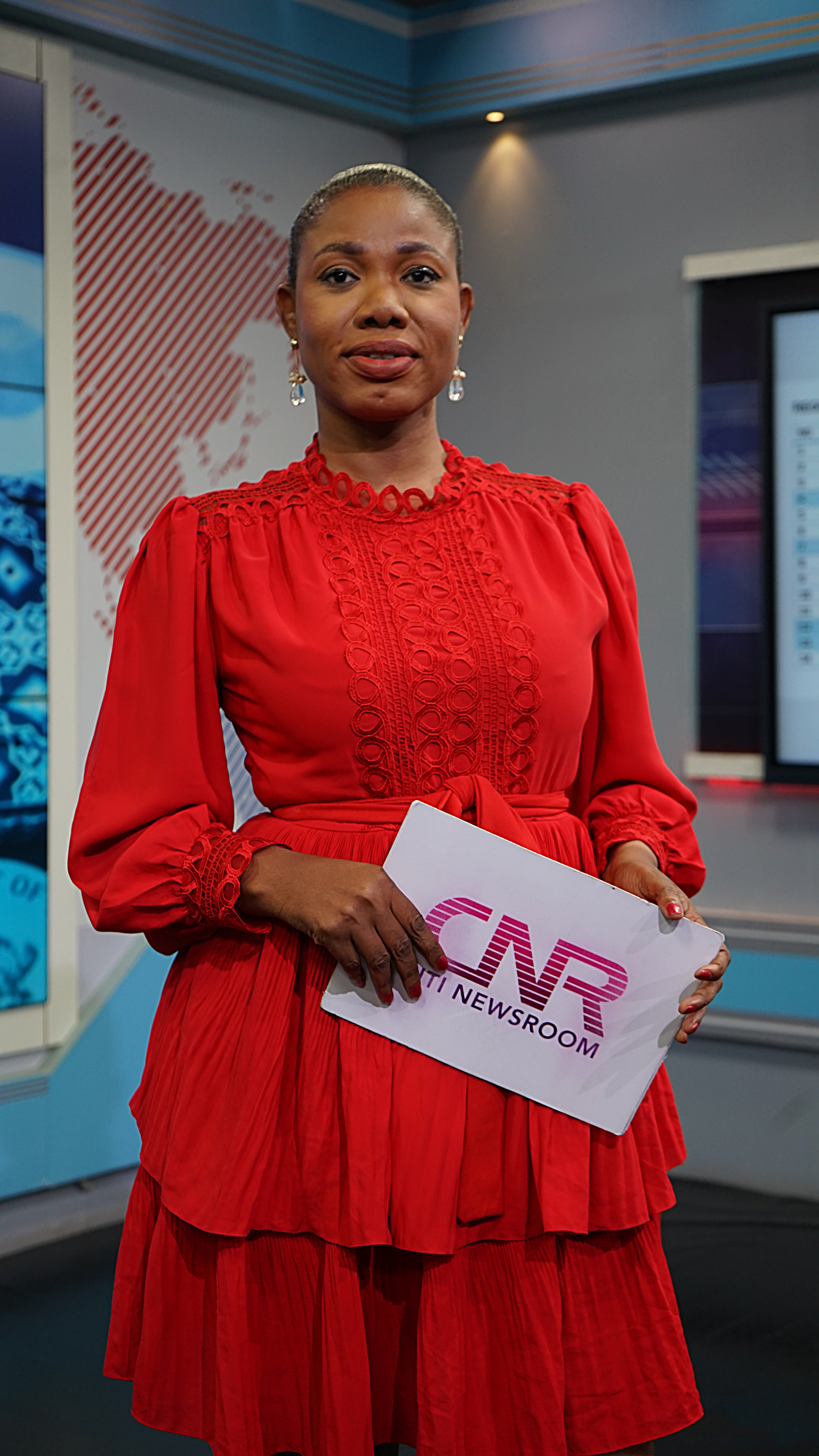
- Vivian Kai Lokko
- Born: January 15; Accra, Ghana
- Other name: Her Lokkoship
- Education: University of Ghana
- Occupation: Broadcast journalist
- Years active: 2010–present
- Known for: Citi FM (97.3) Citi TV Ghana

Vivian Kai Lokko (born 15 January) was a Ghanaian media personality, journalist and business anchor at Citi FM and Channel One TV (formerly Citi TV), which she has resigned from after 17 years. She was claimed to be the only Ghanaian journalist that was nominated by the American Embassy in Washington to cover the hosting of about 50 African leaders by former US President Barack Obama. In 2013, she won the overall Business Journalist of the Year for radio in Ghana.

== Early life and education ==
Vivian was born on 15 January and was known as Vivian Kai Mensah until she got married in 2015. She graduated with a BA in Political Science and Theater Arts from the University of Ghana. She further went to the Gordon Institute of Business Science in the University of Pretoria in South Africa.

== Career ==
She formerly served as the Head of News at Citi TV where she anchored Citi News Room and Citi FM where she anchored Citi Business News. Vivian Kai Lokko was the Head of News at Citi TV and Citi FM.

Vivian is also the CEO of a fashion brand Kailia Nicholas

== Awards and nominations ==
She was nominated by the American Embassy to cover the hosting of about 50 African leaders by US President Barack Obama in Washington.

In October 2014, she was also nominated to cover the Global African Investment Forum hosted by the Daily Mail and David Cameron.

In 2014, Vivian was nominated for the Radio Newscaster of the Year category during the 2014 Radio and Television Personality Awards.

Vivian has covered annual meetings of MultiChoice Africa, Standard Bank of South Africa and other meetings in Mauritius and South Africa.

She was awarded the 'Most Outstanding Female Media Personality' at the Feminine Ghana Achievement Awards in March 2018.

== Personal life ==
Vivian is married to Evans Nii Nortey Lokko in 2015.

== Legacy ==
It was during her leadership Citi FM won the Best Business Radio station in 2012 and 2013. She is claimed to be among 'Top 50 Ghanaian Journalists' by Avance Media.
