= Regina Asamoah =

Ghanaian journalist

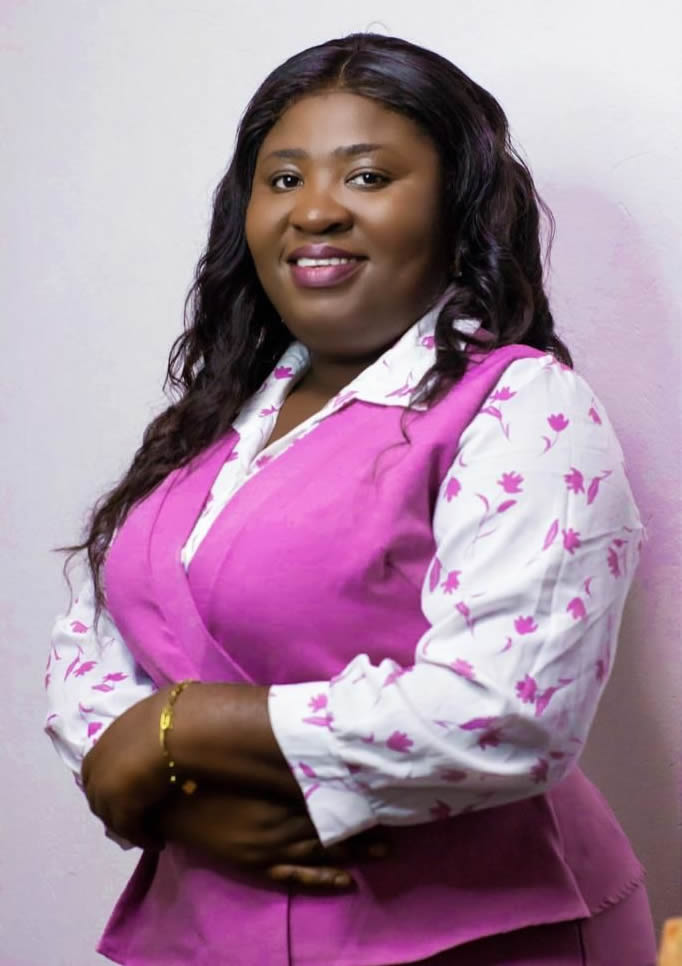
- Occupations: Journalist; Gender activist; Documentary filmmaker; Advocate
- Years active: 2009–present
- Organization: Missing Children Ghana
- Known for: Founder of Missing Children Ghana
- Awards: Ghana Journalists Association Best Female Journalist of the Year (2019)

Regina Asamoah is a Ghanaian journalist, gender activist, and advocate. She is the founder and executive director of Missing Children Ghana, a nonprofit organization focused on rescuing and reuniting missing children with their families. She is also an advocate for gender based violence victims and has initiated several projects to educate and support victims.

== Career ==
Regina Asamoah is a journalist affiliated and has worked with local Ghanaian TV station Atinka TV, covering issues on social issues related to children and women. Her works a journalist has created awareness on issues related to child trafficking, and the plight of missing children in Ghana. She was awarded the Ghana Journalist Association best female Journalist of the Year Award in 2019.

== Missing Children Initiative ==
Her Missing Children initiative established in 2019 is geared towards finding and reuniting missing children with their families. Through this initiative, more than 300 missing children in Ghana have been reunited with their families. The initiative also advocates for better frameworks to protect Children in Ghana.
