= Della Russel Ocloo =

Ghanaian journalist

- Occupations: News reporter, Broadcaster, Journalist, PR Practitioner
- Known for: News Anchor

Della Russel Ocloo is a Ghanaian journalist, communications and media personality. Della is currently the reporter at Graphic Communications Limited in the Tema Municipality. She was also a convenor of a demonstration against the Nana Akufo-Addo's government named the 'FixTheCountry'.

== Career in journalism ==
She is the Tema regional reporter for the Daily Graphic.

== Assault ==
In August 2019, she was assaulted by some members of Glorious Wave International Church at Sakumono for reporting on a protest that was conducted against Badu Kobi, the church's pastor. She was threatened during the coverage. The police were later called, and she got arrested. She was asked to delete the images she took of the scene of the activities of the church.

== Personal life ==
Della Russell is married.

== Honours and awards ==
In June 2018, she won the 'Reporter of the Year' in the Ghana Shippers Awards that was organized by the Ministry of Transport, the Globe Productions, Graphic Communications Group and the Ghana Shippers Authority.
