= CitiTrends (radio show) =

Ghanaian radio show

- Running time: 30 minutes (7:00 pm – 7:30 pm)
- Country of origin: Ghana
- Language: English
- Home station: Citi FM 97.3
- Hosted by: Philip Ashon
- Original release: February 24, 2015
- Website: citifmonline.com
- Podcast: cititrending.tumblr.com

CitiTrends also known as #CitiTrends is a 30-minute radio show which airs on Citi FM and focuses on technology solutions available in Ghana, especially new media in Ghana. It is one of the few radio shows dedicated to technology in Ghana.

The show has featured award-winning Fast Company-listed Leti Arts, Wikipedians in Ghana, Facebook's Konstantinos Papamiltiadis, Worldreader, and TEDx Accra.
