= Samuel Attah-Mensah =

Ghanaian media personality

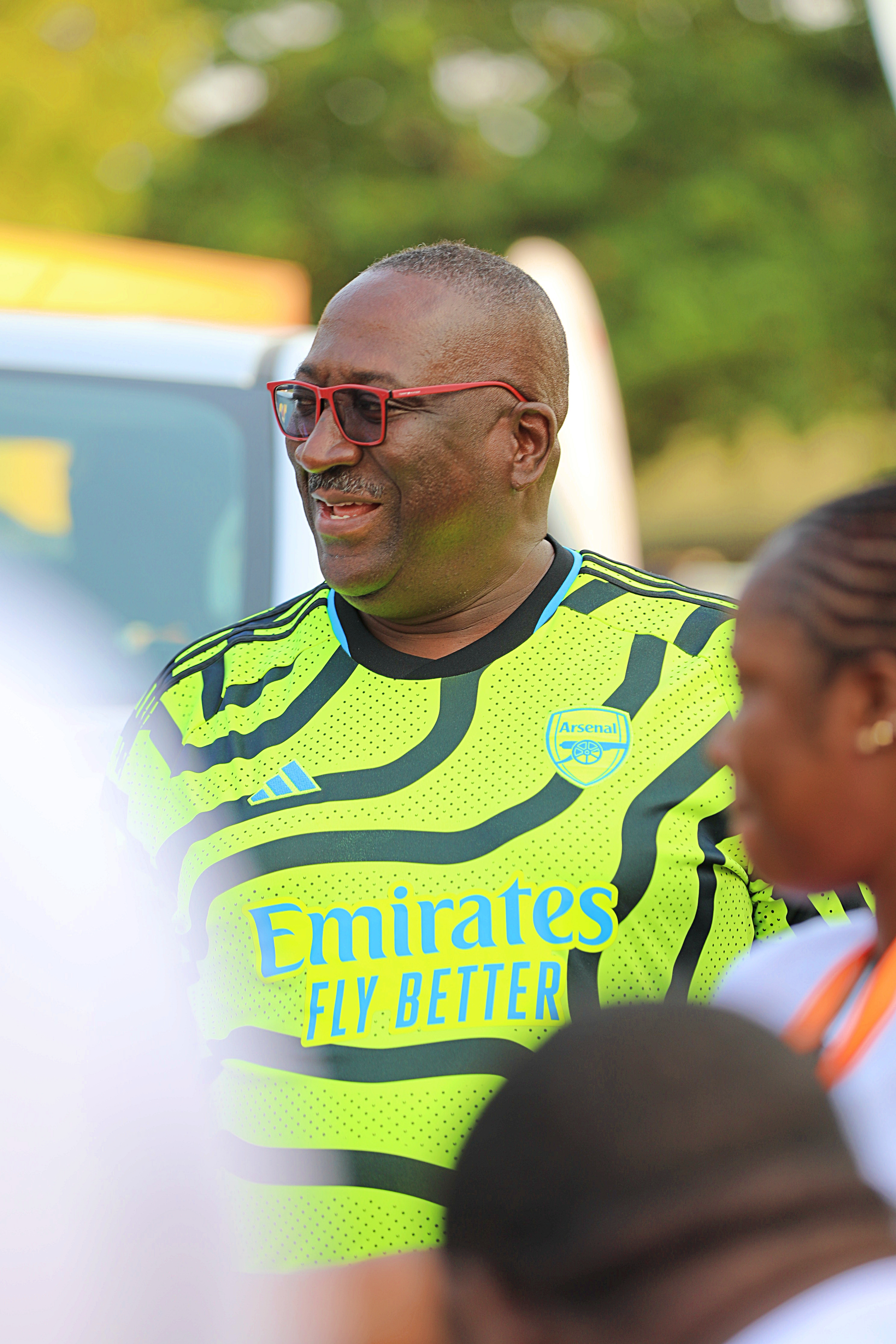
Samuel Attah-Mensah

Samuel Attah-Mensah, also known as 'Sammens', is a Ghanaian media personality, business man and lecturer. He is the managing director of award-winning Accra-based English speaking radio station Citi FM. He is also the Vice President of Ghana Independent Broadcasters Association (GIBA). He is a Fellow of the third class of the African Leadership Initiative-West Africa and a member of the Aspen Global Leadership Network.

== Education ==
In 1992, Attah-Mensah graduated from the Kwame Nkrumah University of Science and Technology (Ghana) with a first degree in Computer Science and an MBA from the University of Leicester, UK. Before that, he had attended Hecta School in Akyem Oda, and State Experimental in Kumasi.

== Early life ==
Attah-Mensah was born at Tema in Ghana. He holds a first degree in computer science from the Kwame Nkrumah University of Science & Technology and an MBA from Leicester University in the UK. He has served as panel member of the Association of International Broadcasters and was the vice president of Ghana Independent Broadcasters Association (GIBA).

== Career ==
Attah-Mensah started his career as an I.T. systems officer with the then ICL Computers and Digitronix Systems, combining systems work with sales and marketing. He then ventured into media, first as a passion and then later building a career out of it. Attah-Mensah also worked as a Market Development Manager for Coca-Cola West Africa in Liberia and Sierra Leone, where he was involved in rebuilding Coca-Cola's presence in these countries after civil wars.

In 2015 Atta-Mensah was known to have prayed the Supreme Court of Ghana to step in after the country's Speaker of Parliament Edward Doe Adjaho refused to take the mandatory oath of office, before acting as head of state, when the president John Dramani Mahama and his vice were away on official assignments.

On 13 April 2018, Attah-Mensah was appointed by the presidency as head of the Coastal Development Authority to be assisted by four deputies. After less than six months in office, he resigned as the head of the Coastal Development Authority. Attah-Mensah is also on the board of Starwin Products Ltd. and Member of Africa Leadership Initiative. He has close to 15 years of experience in general, marketing and media management and he is the managing director of Omni Media Ltd, the operator of Citi 97.3 FM and Citifmonline.com.

He also served as Programmes Director at Multimedia Broadcasting, where he oversaw the setting up of a number of radio stations in Accra, Kumasi and Tema, all in Ghana. He was honoured with a Special Recognition Award at the 13th Gong Gong Awards organized by the Advertising Association of Ghana.

== Bureau of National Investigations issue ==
In 2014, Samuel Atta-Mensah was picked up by the Bureau of National Investigations (BNI) for questioning after the publication of a story on citifmonline.com about a 12 kg cocaine drug bust at Heathrow Airport, involving a Ghanaian woman. Despite his release, the national security agency was heavily criticized for what many believed was an extreme move.
