= National Democratic Congress (Ghana) =

Political party in Ghana

- Abbreviation: NDC
- Leader: John Mahama
- Chairperson: Asiedu Nketia
- General Secretary: Fifi Kwetey
- Founder: Jerry Rawlings
- Founded: 28 July 1992; 34 years ago
- Headquarters: Adama Ave, Adabraka, Accra
- Student wing: TEIN
- Ideology: Social democracy
- Political position: Centre-left
- International affiliation: Progressive Alliance; Socialist International
- Colors: Green, White, Red, Black
- Slogan: Unity, Stability and Development
- Anthem: "Arise, Arise for Ghana"
- Parliament: 184 / 276
- Pan-African Parliament: 3 / 5

Election symbol
- The Umbrella with the Head of a Eagle at the Tip

Party flag

Website
- www.ndc.org.gh

The National Democratic Congress (NDC) is a social democratic political party in Ghana, founded by Jerry Rawlings, who was Head of State from 1981 to 1993. He became the President of Ghana from 1993 to 2001. Following the formation of the Provisional National Defence Council (PNDC), which ruled Ghana following the military coup d'état on 31 December 1981, there was pressure from the international community to restore democracy. The NDC was formed as the ruling party ahead of elections in 1992, in which Rawlings was elected president, and in 1996 Rawlings was re-elected as the NDC candidate. Rawlings' second term ended in 2001.

The NDC lost the presidency in the 2000 election, and it was not until the 2008 election, that they regained it with John Atta Mills as its candidate. They established the 1992 constitution.

The NDC party symbol is an umbrella with the head of a dove at the tip. The party colors are red, white, green, and black, with the party slogan or motto as "Unity, stability, and development." Internationally, the NDC is a member of the Progressive Alliance and Socialist International.

On 9 December 2012, the Electoral Commission of Ghana declared NDC candidate John Mahama to be president-elect after a hotly contested race in which he won 50.7% of the votes cast.

== History ==
The National Democratic Congress was founded by Jerry Rawlings, who had been the military leader of Ghana since 1981. In 1992, the NDC led the successful transition to multi-party competition, an example of authoritarian-led democratization. The NDC won the 1992 and 1996 elections.

=== 2000 elections ===
The 2000 election was the first presidential election since 1992 that an incumbent president was not on the ballot. Jerry Rawlings' eight-year tenure had expired as per the Constitution of Ghana. John Atta Mills became the presidential candidate of the National Democratic Congress at a special delegate congress held in Ho in the Volta Region. He was popularly acclaimed the presidential candidate of the party for the 2000 presidential election. Vice-president John Atta Mills lost in 2000 to the New Patriotic Party's John Kufuor after two rounds of voting.

=== 2004 elections ===
In the 2004 elections, the party's manifesto called for "A Better Ghana". John Atta Mills ran again for the NDC in the 2004 presidential elections with his running mate Muhammad Mumuni. He won 44.6% of the vote, but lost to the New Patriotic Party. In the general elections held on 7 December 2004, the party won only 94 of the 230 seats.

=== 2008 elections ===
On 21 December 2006, Mills was overwhelmingly elected by the NDC as its candidate for the 2008 presidential election with a majority of 81.4%, or 1,362 votes. Ekwow Spio-Garbrah was second with 8.7% (146 votes), Mahama Iddrisu was third with 8.2% (137 votes), and Edward Annan was fourth with 1.7% (28 votes). In April 2008, John Mahama was chosen as the party's vice-presidential candidate. On 3 January 2009, Mills was certified as the victor of the 28 December 2008 run-off election and became the next president of Ghana.

=== 2012 transfer of power and elections ===
President John Atta Mills died, after a short illness, in the afternoon of 24 July 2012 while still in office. Vice President John Mahama of the NDC was sworn in as president that evening. The NDC picked Mahama for their presidential candidate and sitting vice president Paa Kwesi Amissah-Arthur as their vice-presidential candidate for the 2012 elections.

=== 2016 primaries ===
In November 2015 after securing an overwhelming 1,199,118 out of a total of 1,286,728 votes representing 95.10% party members in the presidential primaries, President John Mahama was endorsed to lead the NDC in the 2016 general elections.

=== 2020 elections ===
In February 2019, John Mahama was confirmed as the candidate of the opposition National Democratic Congress to contest in the 2020 elections, the incumbent president Nana Akufo-Addo who unseated Mahama in a 2016 election, capitalizing on an economy that was slowing due to falling prices for gold, oil and cocoa exports. He won the National Democratic Congress primaries by securing an overwhelming 213,487 votes representing 95.23 percent of the total valid votes cast with the other six contenders managing with about 4 percent of the votes.

On 25 June 2020 the NDC led by its General Secretary Asiedu Nketiah, lost a case in the Supreme Court of Ghana in which the party had sought to achieve the inclusion of old Voter ID cards in the Electoral Commission's compilation of a New Voter's Register, among other reliefs.

In the 2020 elections, 18 members of the party who sought to run as independent candidates lost their membership. All who endorsed the forms of the candidates and participated in their campaigns were also expelled.

=== 2024 elections ===
During the 2024 Ghanaian general election, the NDC candidate, former President John Mahama, won a majority of votes, enough to win without a runoff. The incumbent NPP candidate Mahamudu Bawumia conceded defeat the morning after election night. Mahama's running-mate Jane Naana Opoku-Agyemang became the first woman to be elected as vice president of Ghana. During the 2024 parliamentary elections, the NDC won a landslide victory, winning 184 out of 276 seats.

== Governments formed ==
Since the NDC was formed, it has formed two governments following elections, and a third following the death of President Mills. The list of governments is as follows:

- Rawlings government (1993–2001)
- Mills government (2009–2012)
- Mahama government (2012-2017 -2025-2029)

== National Executives ==
The National Democratic Congress holds elections every four years to elect its national executives.

=== 2018 to present ===
The National Democratic Congress held its national delegates conference on 17–19 November at the Ghana International Trade Fair Centre, La, Accra. Below is the full list: National Chairman – Samuel Ofosu-Ampofo, First Vice Chairman – Chief Sofo Azorka, Second Vice Chairperson Sherry Ayitey, Third Vice Chairman – Alhaji Said Sinare, General Secretary – Johnson Asiedu-Nketia, First Deputy General Secretary – Madam Barbara Serwaa Asamoah, Second Deputy General Secretary – Peter Boamah Otokonor, National Organiser – Joshua Hamido Akamba, First Deputy National Organiser – Kobby Barlon, Second Deputy National Organiser – Chief Hamilton Biney Nixon, National Communications Director – Sammy Gyamfi, First Deputy Communications Director – Kwaku Boahene, Second Deputy National Communications Director – Godwin Ako Gunn, The National Zongo Caucus Coordinator – Alhaji Mamah Mohammed, The National Executive Committee Members: Madam Evelyn Enyonam Mensa, Alhaji Adramani Haribu, Sheriff Abdul Nasiru, Alhaji Babanlame Abu Sadat and Mr William Wilson Agbleke, National Youth Organiser – George Opare Addo, First Deputy National Youth Organiser – Edem Agbana, Second Deputy National Youth Organiser – Ruth Dela Sedoh, National Women's Organiser – Hanna Louisa Bissiw, First Deputy National Women's Organiser – Maame Efua Sekyi Addo, Second National Women's Organiser – Madam Abigail Elorm.

== Death of the Founder ==
The NDC decided to hold a vigil in memory of JJ Rawlings, the founder of the party who died on 12 November 2020 at the Korle-Bu Teaching Hospital.

== Election results ==
=== Presidential elections ===
Election	Candidate	First Round		Second Round		Result
Election	Candidate	Votes	%	Votes	%	Result
1992	Jerry Rawlings	2,327,600	58.4%	—		Elected ✓
1996	Jerry Rawlings	4,099,758	57.4%	—		Elected ✓
2000	John Atta Mills	2,895,575	44.8%	2,728,241	43.3%	Lost ✗
2004	John Atta Mills	3,850,368	44.6%	—		Lost ✗
2008	John Atta Mills	4,056,634	47.9%	4,501,466	50.1%	Elected ✓
2012	John Mahama	5,574,761	50.7%	—		Elected ✓
2016	John Mahama	4,713,277	44.4%	—		Lost ✗
2020	John Mahama	6,213,182	47.36%	—		Lost ✗
2024	John Mahama	6,591,790	56.42%	—		Elected ✓

=== Parliamentary elections ===
Election	Votes	%	Seats	+/–	Position	Result
1992	1,521,629	77.5%	189 / 200	▲189	▲1st	Supermajority government
1996	4,099,758	57.4%	133 / 200	▼56	1st	Supermajority government
2000	2,691,515	41.2%	91 / 200	▼42	▼2nd	Opposition
2004	3,505,074	40.8%	94 / 230	▲3	2nd	Opposition
2008	3,776,917	44.1%	116 / 230	▲22	▲1st	Majority government
2012	5,127,671	46.4%	148 / 275	▲32	1st	Majority government
2016	4,560,491	42.2%	104 / 275	▼44	▼2nd	Opposition
2020	6,094,478	46.2%	137 / 275	▲32	2nd	Opposition
2024	6,224,054	53.0%	184 / 276	▲47	▲1st	Supermajority government

Preceded by Provisional National Defence Council (military government)	Governments of Ghana; Rawlings government 1993–2001	Succeeded by Kufuor government (New Patriotic Party)
Preceded by Kufuor government (New Patriotic Party)	Governments of Ghana; Mills government & Mahama government 2009–2017	Succeeded by Akufo-Addo government (New Patriotic Party)
