= Nana Aba Anamoah =

Ghanaian TV personality (born 1976)

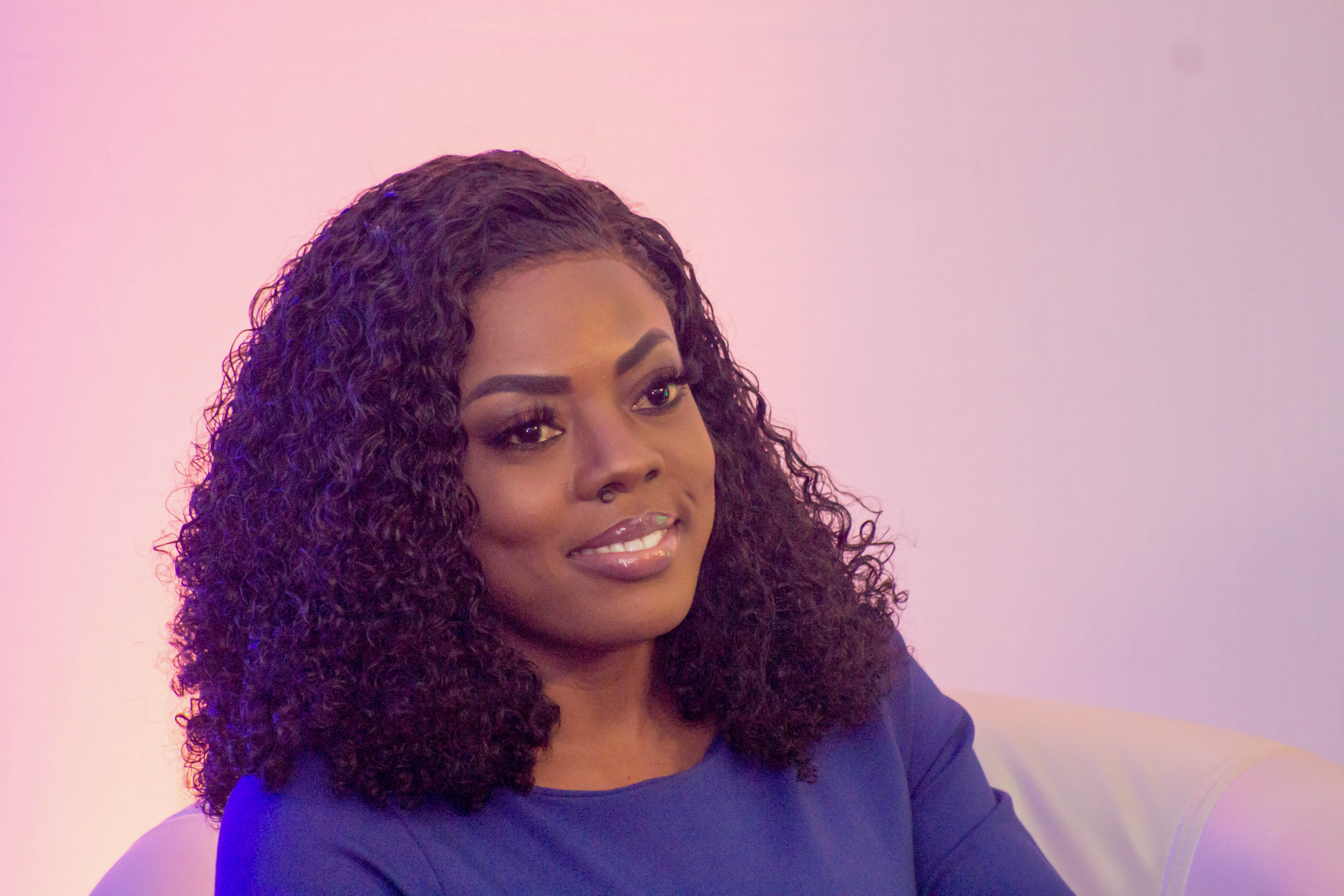
- Nana Aba Anamoah at the African Women Sports Summit
- Born: Rosemond Nana Aba McEwan-Anamoah; June 19, 1980 (age 46)
- Other name: Obaapa Anamoah
- Occupations: News anchor, broadcaster, media personality
- Years active: 2001–present
- Employer: EIB Network
- Organization: GHOne TV
- Children: 1

Nana Aba Anamoah (birth name: Rosemond Nana Aba McEwan-Anamoah, born on June 19, 1980) is a Ghanaian media personality. Until her resignation from TV3, she presented the news and hosted top shows, including The Divas Show. She is known as 'English Madam' on social media due to her fluency in the English language. She was the General Manager of GHOne TV and Starr 103.5 FM. She is currently the director of business development for EIB network. She is also the ambassador for women's football in Ghana.

Anamoah is a member of the Women's Premier League committee in Ghana. She is also a football fanatic who supports Manchester United and Accra Great Olympics.

== Education ==
Anamoah is a product of Ghana National College and has a background in Development Finance from the University of Ghana Business School. She also graduated in banking and finance at GIMPA. She has taken up Executive Education courses, including one in 21st Century Leadership from the Harvard Kennedy School (Harvard University).

== Awards ==
- TV Personality of the Year, RTP Awards (2017, 2019).
- TV Personality (Female), Glitz Africa Awards 2018.
- TV News Anchor of the Year (2004, 2008, 2012, 2017).
- TV Development Show Host of the Year, RTP Awards 2018.
- Excellence in Media Honors at the Ghana Women of the Year Honors 2019.

== Personal life ==
Nana Aba Anamoah is a Catholic. She gave up on her Medical School after knowing that she was pregnant. She is a mother of one, a son Jyotir, who attends school in the United States.

== Philanthropy ==
She is known for her charitable endeavors; on 25 January 2022, she launched Hearts Wide Open, a foundation established to serve as a support system for those in need of funding for medical emergencies, school fees etc.

In April 2023, Nana Aba supported a man financially who was offered a job in the United Kingdom but lacked funds to undergo medical checkup.
