= Nana Yaa Serwaa Sarpong =

Ghanaian media personality and entrepreneur

- Born: 30 June 1983; Kumasi, Ghana
- Education: University of Ghana Business School, Mountcrest University College, Ghana Communication Technology University
- Alma mater: Anhalt University
- Occupations: Media personality, entrepreneur
- Years active: 1999–present

Nana Yaa Serwaa Sarpong is a Ghanaian media personality and entrepreneur who was a programs and channels manager at Crystal TV and Multimedia Group. Currently, Sarpong is the General manager of EIB English and Akan Cluster which comprises Starr Fm, GHOne TV, Kasapa FM and Agoo TV. She is the President and Founder for Women in Sustainability Africa (WISA), an initiative focused on working on the closure of SDG related gender gaps in Africa.

== Education ==
Sarpong studied at Yaa Asantewaa Girls' Senior High School in Kumasi where she developed a keen interest in the media space. She was the host of a youth talk show "Conscious Vibes" which discussed social issues and challenges impacting the lives of young people. The show grew and extended unto Fox Fm in Kumasi where she co-hosted it with Opoku Opare.

Nana Yaa Serwaa Sarpong holds a joint MBA International Trade degree from Anhalt University, Germany and Ghana Communication Technology University, Ghana. She also holds an LLB from Mountcrest University College, Ghana. Nana Yaa possesses a BSc. Business Administration degree from the University of Ghana Business School and a Chartered Postgraduate Diploma in Marketing from CIM UK.

== Career ==
She started her career at Fontonfrom TV in 1999 and moved on to manage multiple TV stations like the three Crystal TV FTA Channels and Multimedia Group's Cine Afrik, 4Kids, The Jesus Channels, Joy prime until 2019.

Nana Yaa joined the Kludjeson International Group to lead, launch and manage Ghana’s first locally branded and assembled PC Brand in Ghana, as Project Manager of AKA Computers from 2006 to 2007.

In 2011, Nana Yaa Serwaa Sarpong joined Multimedia Group Ltd as Channel Manager of three brands: Cine Afrik, The Jesus Channel and 4KIDS Channel. All three channels eventually merged into Joy Prime Channel, which she set up and managed since March 2015. Her channels were nominated for several awards and won over 14 awards recognising the channels' brand strength, programs and partnerships with key events in Ghana.

She is now into consultancy and management of her NGO, League of Extraordinary Women. Nana Yaa Serwaa Sarpong is the owner and chief executive officer for Elohay Group, which specialises in trade, business process outsourcing, management of media platforms, advertising and events management.

In 2025, She launched Women in Sustainability Africa (WISA). An organisation that aims to focus on sustainable development issues by addressing the gender inequality and other gaps in the implementation of the SDGs in Africa.

In late 2025, Sarpong expanded her international advocacy by moderating key panels at the 80th United Nations General Assembly, focusing on Sustainable Development Goals (SDGs), media leadership, and global sustainability. Additionally, she addressed the United Kingdom House of Lords during the Global Education Summit, where she advocated for bold educational reforms aimed at fostering innovation and inclusivity within African education systems.

== Awards ==
- Best in Consultancy and Professional Service - Forty Under 40 Awards Ceremony, 2020
- Lifetime Achievement Citation for Excellence in Media Management Award - Radio and Television Personality (RTP) Awards, 2023.
- Media Personality of the Year Award - Ghana Leadership Awards, 2019
- Female Entrepreneur of the Year - Africa Women Economic and Leadership Forum and Awards (AWELFA) 2023, Cameroon
- Top 100 Achiever Alumini Award - Ghana Communication Technology University and Anhalt University, Germany
- Media Personality of the Year - Ghana Leadership Awards, 2019
- Outstanding Channel Manager - C-BAZE Awards 2018
- Outstanding Contribution to Kids Television and Entertainment - Ghana Kids Choice Awards, 2016
- Best in Marketing & Communications - Forty Under 40 Awards Ceremony, 2022
- Extraordinary leadership achievements and contribution to Ghana’s Media landscape and Social Change - Ghana Peace Awards, 2016
- Contribution to Social Impact & Development - Humanitarian Awards Global, 2021
