= TV3 Mentor =

Music Reality Show

TV3 Mentor is a music reality show organized by TV3. The reality show was the first reality show concerning music organized in Ghana.

== Awards ==
| Winner | Season |
|---|---|
| Kweku Bany | Mentor 2020 |
| Optional King | Mentor Reloaded |
| Roselyn Akosua Mantey | Mentor 7 |
| Lee Stone | Mentor 6 |
| Lamuel Ansah-Acquah | Mentor 5 |
| Kesse | Mentor 4 |
| Erico | Mentor 3 |
| Prince | Mentor 2 |
| Prince | Mentor 1 |
