= Rockson Bukari =

Ghanaian politician

The Honourable Rockson Bukari

Regional Minister
- Incumbent
- Assumed office February 2017
- President: Nana Akuffo-Addo
- Succeeded by: Paulina Abagaye

Personal details
- Born: Ghana
- Party: New Patriotic Party

Rockson Bukari is a Ghanaian politician and a member of the New Patriotic Party in Ghana. He was the Upper East Regional minister of Ghana. He was appointed by President Nana Addo Danquah Akuffo-Addo in January 2017 and was approved by the Members of Parliament in February 2017.
