= Auguster Asantewa Boateng =

Ghanaian journalist

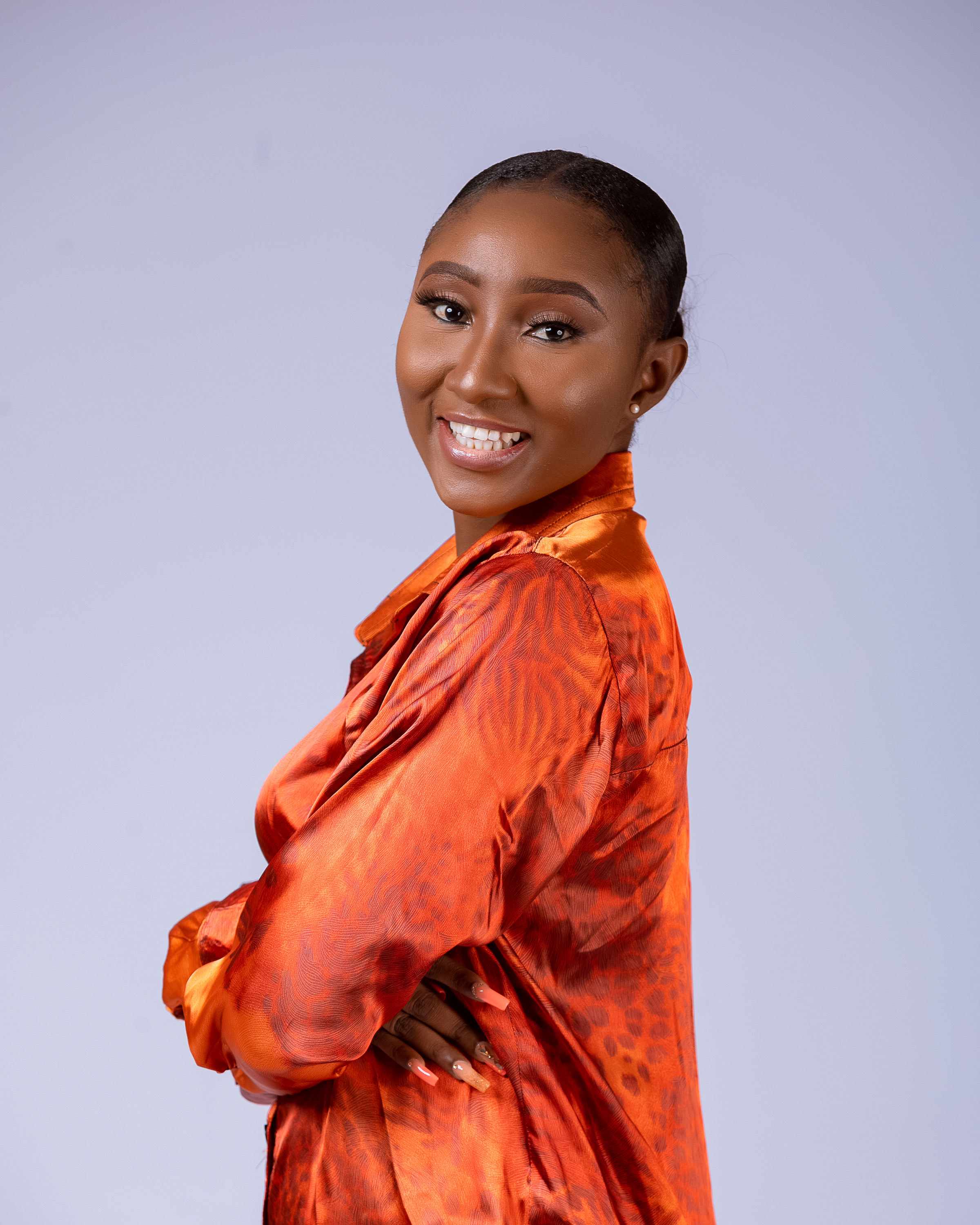
- Auguster Asantewa Boateng, media professional & social entrepreneur
- Occupations: News anchor, Broadcaster, Journalist
- Known for: News Anchor

Auguster Asantewa Boateng is a Ghanaian broadcast journalist, communication professional and social entrepreneur who currently works as director of SHE Media and chief editor of power house magazine.

== Career ==
Auguster is a journalist and chief executive officer of SHE Media and also a social entrepreneur in Ghana. She is also a gender activist.

== Awards and recognition ==
Auguster was awarded the 'Most Outstanding Female Personality in Education' award in 2018. In April 2021, She was appointed as The Federation of International Gender and Human Rights (FIGHR) Ambassador to Ghana.

== Other works ==
Auguster is the founder of a nonprofit and human right advocacy group called The Butterfly Effect. This group aims at promoting education among the deprived regions in Ghana. She is also a development counselor and life coach.
