= Sydney Sadick =

American entertainment commentator

- Born: February 2, 1994 (age 32); New York City
- Education: George Washington University
- Occupations: On-air fashion and entertainment personality
- Website: https://sydneysadick.com/

Sydney Kamin Sadick (born February 2, 1994) is an American on-air fashion and entertainment commentator. She regularly contributes to news and entertainment programs across the United States, including Hoda & Jenna, E! News, Inside Edition, NBC New York Live, Good Day New York, Good Day LA, Fox's Top 30, ABC's Good Morning Washington and ABC's The Jam Chicago. She is a former editor at the Daily Front Row and is a contributing writer to Hamptons Magazine.

== Early life ==
Sadick was born in New York City. She is the daughter of dermatologist Neil Sadick and Amy Kamin, former CEO of Endymed, Inc. She attended The Hewitt School from kindergarten through 12th grade. She earned her bachelor's degree in journalism from George Washington University, where she was a member of the AEPHI sorority.

== Career ==
Sadick's career began as a high school student at Harvard University's summer program, where she was required to start a blog as a requirement for a journalism course. The blog developed into Style Solutions, a daily fashion blog. Upon returning to New York City, she began interviewing celebrities and designers, including Rihanna.

While in college, Sadick held various internships including with Rachel Zoe, Inc. and O, The Oprah Magazine. Her next was an internship at the Daily Front Row in 2010, where she became an editor upon her graduation in 2016. She was responsible for writing articles both online and in print and has interviewed figures including Kim Kardashian, David Beckham, The Chainsmokers, Tom Brady, Sofia Vergara, Diane Von Furstenberg, Oscar de la Renta, Heidi Klum, Maria Sharapova, Carrie Underwood, and Kylie Jenner. She has covered the Met Ball, New York Fashion Week, and the CFDA Awards.

Sadick made her television debut on Amazon's digital show Style Code Live with host Franke Grande, where she was a style contributor. This led to being a regular contributor to NBC's New York Live, Fox's Top 30, and The Jam. She has also made appearances on Hoda & Jenna, E! News, Inside Edition, Doctor & the Diva, Good Morning Washington, Good Day LA, Good Day NY, and more. Sadick has also appeared on the Lifetime show Project Runway

Sadick was named a broadcast spokesperson for Olay's red jar products. She appeared in segments in taxi cabs across New York, Chicago, Los Angeles, Philadelphia. Washington DC, Dallas, New Orleans, Miami, and other cities. She also was featured in Direct TV segments.

Sadick has also hosted industry events and parties, including a Millennial Pink Party in the Hamptons.

== Other ventures ==
In addition to Sadick's television work, she works with brands to help drive sales and brand awareness. Her clients include Schutz, De Beers, Rebag, Furla, Ramy Brook, Kendra Scott, Intermix, Cutera, Alice and Olivia, and American Express Wardrobe App.

On September 15, 2020, Sadick released her first book, "Aim High: How to Style Your Life and Achieve Your Goals."

== Personal life ==
Sadick is married to Nick Adams and the couple resides in New York City. She divides her time between homes in the Hamptons and Palm Beach, Florida.
