= Emmanuel Badu Kobi =

Ghanaian pastor

Emmanuel Kobi Badu is a Ghanaian pastor, businessman, philanthropist and writer.

== Background ==
Born on 3 May in Ashanti Region of Ghana. He is the founder and general overseer of Glorious Wave Church International, president of Kingdom Bible College, Emmanuel Kobi Ministries, and the author of several publications and books including "Born for Glory" and " The Church Back to Eden”.

== Family ==
He is divorced from Gloria Sarfo who is also from Asante Region of Ghana.

His son, Daniel Kenneth Badu Kobi, born on 10 April 1998, died at the age of 19 after a short illness. He was a student of Ashesi University at the time of his death. The funeral was attended by high-ranking members of the society including former president John Dramani Mahama, Afia Schwarzenegger and other religious figures.

== Philanthropy and ministry ==
Kobi has given out more than 200 cars to people in Ghana, including celebrity musicians Obaapa Christy, Yaw Sarpong and Daddy Lumba. Counselor George Lutterodt was also a beneficiary.

Church members have given him cars, a house with a Jacuzzi and many other gifts. On 13 September 2016, Kobi donated $10,000 to veteran actor Abeiku Yyame at the Korle-bu teaching hospital. The actor was reported suffering from enlargement of the heart or cardiomegaly.

== Criticisms ==
In February 2019, Abronye DC of the ruling New Patriotic Party denounced Kobi as a "fake pastor", claiming he "consistently give[s] false prophecies".

In July 2019, Kobi was criticized in the Parliament of Ghana for derogatory language he used towards Ashanti and Fanti women. The Christian Council of Ghana also criticized his comments, describing them as "bigoted" and "unnecessary and lawless".
