= Barbara Serwaa Asamoah =

Ghanaian lawyer and politician

Hon. Barbara Serwaa Asamoah

Deputy Minister of Land and Natural Resources
- In office 2013–2017
- President: John Dramani Mahama

Personal details
- Born: Barbara Serwaa Asamoah
- Party: National Democratic Congress
- Occupation: Lawyer

Barbara Serwaa Asamoah (born 18 February) is a Ghanaian lawyer and politician. She is a member of the National Democratic Congress (NDC) and is the current deputy General Secretary of the party.

In October 2025 she was sworn in as a board member of National Communications Authority (NCA).

== Politics ==
In 2013, she was nominated and appointed into office as the deputy Minister of Land and Natural Resources, a role she served in till her party, the National Democratic Congress lost the elections in 2016 and handed over to the next government in 2017. On the 19th of December, 2022, Barbara Serwaa Asamoah, the retained Deputy General Secretary of the National Democratic Congress (NDC), has dismissed claims that Samuel Ofosu-Ampofo's defeat at the National Delegates Congress was due to underperformance.
