= Young African Leaders Initiative =

US Department of State project

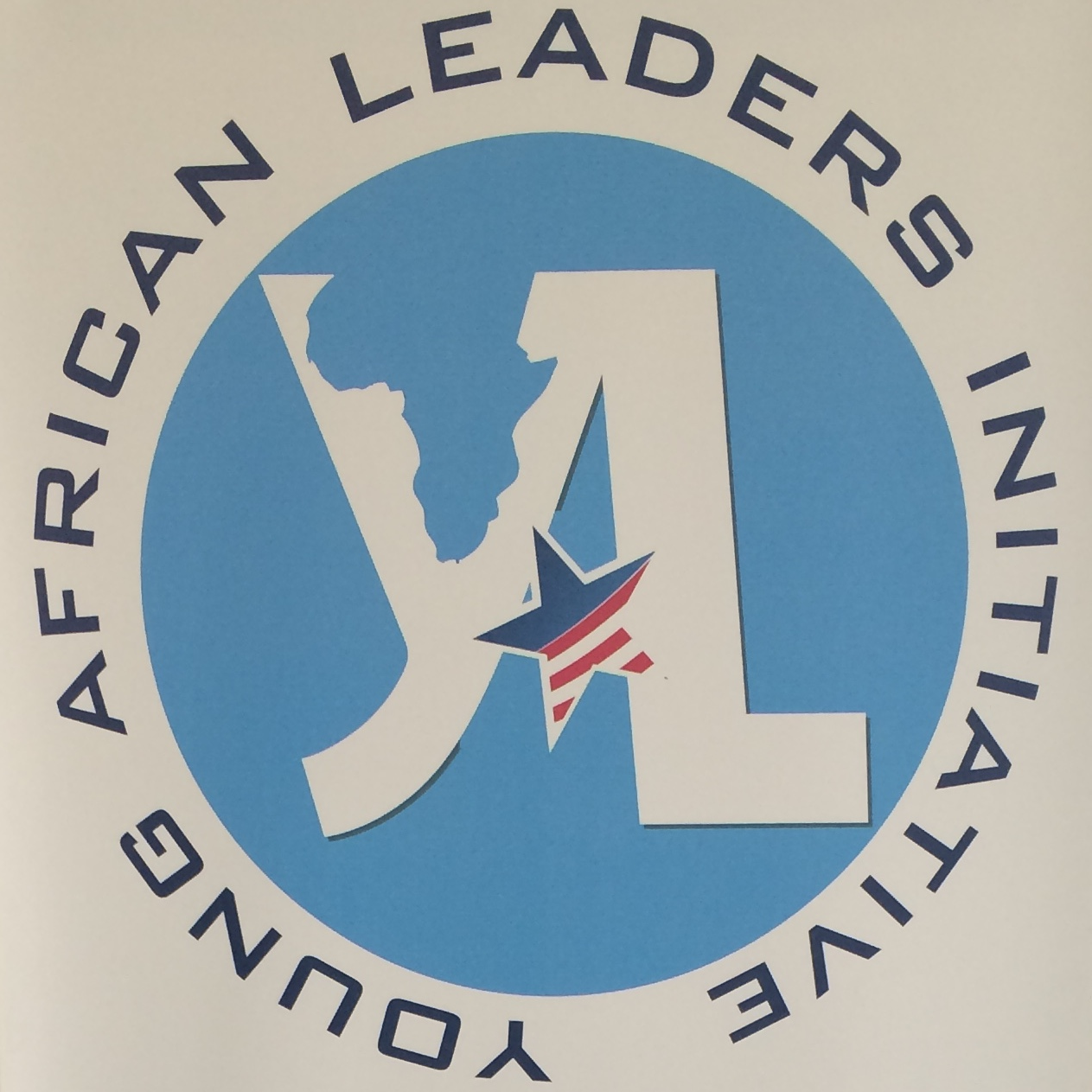
YALI logo

The Young African Leaders Initiative (YALI) is an initiative of the United States Department of State. It was started by President Barack Obama in 2010. YALI is a programme aimed at educating and networking young African leaders with activities including the Mandela Washington Fellowship that brings them to study in the United States for six weeks with follow-up resources and student exchange programs. In 2014, the program was expanded to include four regional "leadership centers" in Ghana, Kenya, Senegal and South Africa.

500 participants in the Mandela Washington Fellowship arrived in the United States on June 16, 2014. In 2019, there were 700 fellows.The Mandela Washington Fellowship will not take place in 2026. The Fellowship will continue to offer opportunities for Alumni.

== YALI Regional Leadership Center ==
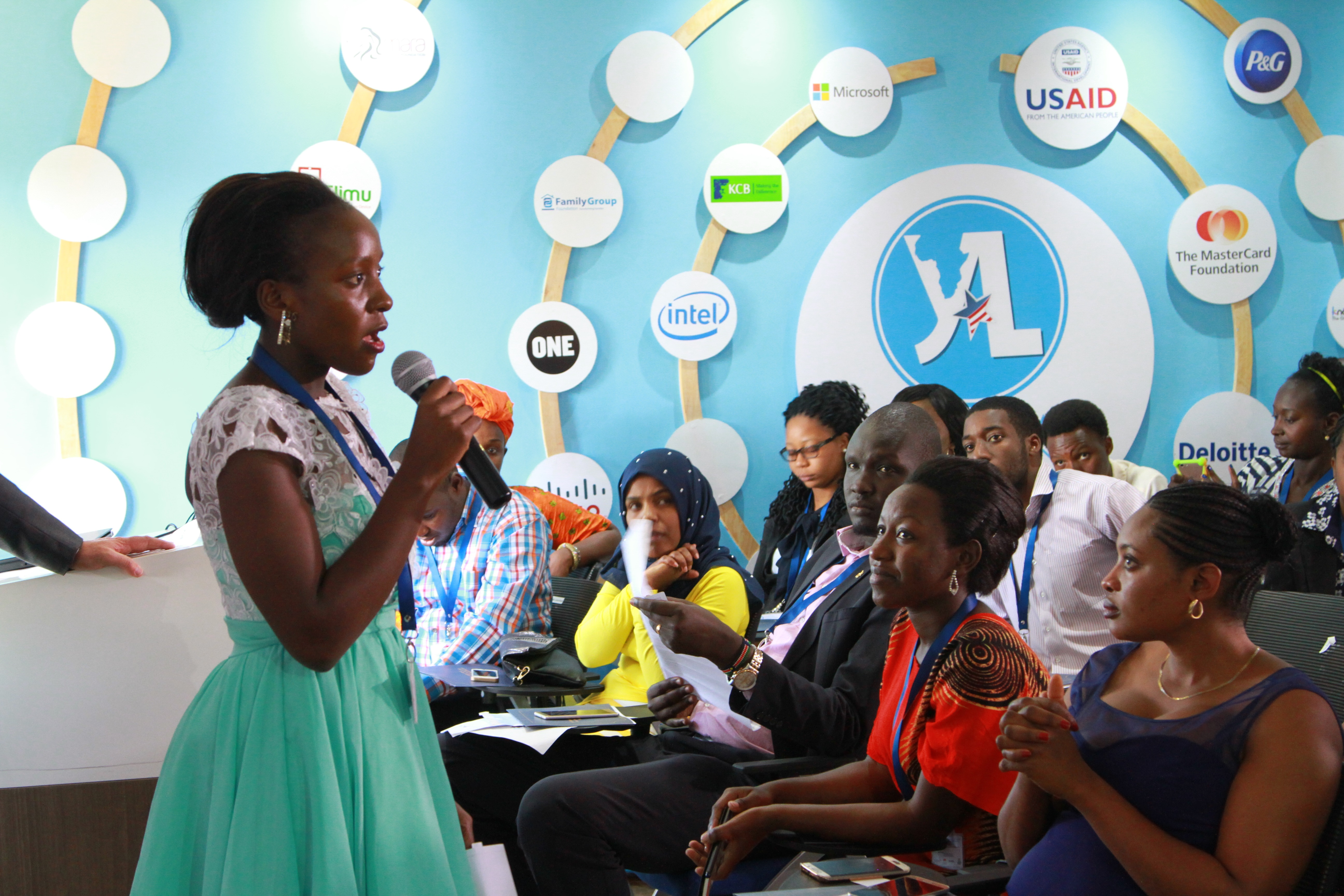
2017

As part of efforts to decentralize and to reach a large number of young leaders, the Young African Leaders Initiative program created regional leadership centers across the African continent known as the YALI Regional Leadership Center (RLC). Participants of the Regional Leadership Centers go through online and in-person training and are provided with professional development opportunities in these three track areas: Business and Entrepreneurship, Civil Society Management, and Public Policy and Management.

The Regional Leadership Center is located in West Africa, with centers in the Ghana Institute of Management and Public Administration (GIMPA), Accra, Ghana, and the Centre Africain d'Etudes Supérieures en Gestion (CESAG), Dakar, Senegal. The Accra Center has a satellite campus at the Administrative Staff College of Nigeria (ASCON), near Lagos, Nigeria. The center in Dakar, Senegal, is for French-speaking West Africans.

There is a YALI Regional Leadership Center for East Africans located at Kenyatta University, Nairobi, Kenya, which serves citizens of the following countries: Burundi, Central African Republic, Republic of Congo, Democratic Republic of the Congo, Djibouti, Eritrea, Ethiopia, Kenya, Rwanda, Somalia, South Sudan, Sudan, Tanzania and Uganda.

The Southern African Regional Leadership Center is at University of South Africa (UNISA) School of Business Leadership (SBL), near Pretoria, South Africa, with a satellite campus at Universidade Eduardo Mondlane, Maputo, Mozambique, for Portuguese speakers.

== YALI Rwanda chapter ==
YALI Regional leadership centre East Africa Alumni has a chapter in Rwanda, the mission of which is "to empower young leaders in Rwanda and East Africa to develop the skills, knowledge, and networks needed to drive sustainable development and social change."
