= Citi FM =

Private radio station in Accra

- Accra; Ghana
- Broadcast area: Greater Accra Region
- Frequency: 97.3 MHz

Programming
- Language: English
- Format: Local and International news, talk, sports, politics, culture and music

Ownership
- Owner: Omni Media Limited; (Omni Media Company Limited)

History
- First air date: 2004

Links
- Website: www.citinewsroom.com

Citi FM is a privately owned radio station in Accra, the capital of Ghana. Omni Media Limited owns and runs the station. The station was adjudged the best English-speaking Radio Station in Ghana, at the 25th Ghana Journalists Associations' (GJA) Awards ceremony.

== Citi Breakfast Show (#CitiCBS) ==
The Citi Breakfast Show is Citi FM's flagship morning talk show that airs from 6:15 am to 10 am with Bernard Avle as the host. Bernard and his team have gained public respect in the last decade by exploring, questioning and presenting a morning show that delves into current affairs and matters of importance often overlooked in the excited babble of socio-political news.

The hashtag #CitiCBS has won recognition for its nationally relevant work in promoting Ghanaian business and economy, ending Galamsey, and more. The Citi Breakfast show was adjudged the Best Radio Morning Show of the year (English category) in Ghana in 2019 and 2020.

Citi radio and its sister television station, CitiTv have undertaken campaigns such as 'Eat Ghana Rice', 'About Town' and 'Road Safety Campaign' which have gained public acceptance and have contributed greatly to public awareness and education.

== Awards and recognition ==
Radio and Television Personalities Awards Radio Station Of The Year 2019–2020.

== Notable presenters ==
- Bernard Avle
- Samuel Attah-Mensah
- Vivian Kai Lokko
- Kent Mensah
- Kokui Selormey
- Christopher Opoku
- Nana Ama Agyemang Asante
- Kojo Akoto Boateng
- Sandister Tei
- Nana Boakye-Yiadom (journalist)
- Umaru Sanda Amadu
- Richard Dela Sky
- Caleb Kudah

== Programs ==
- CitiTrends
