= University of Media, Arts and Communication =

Public university in Ghana

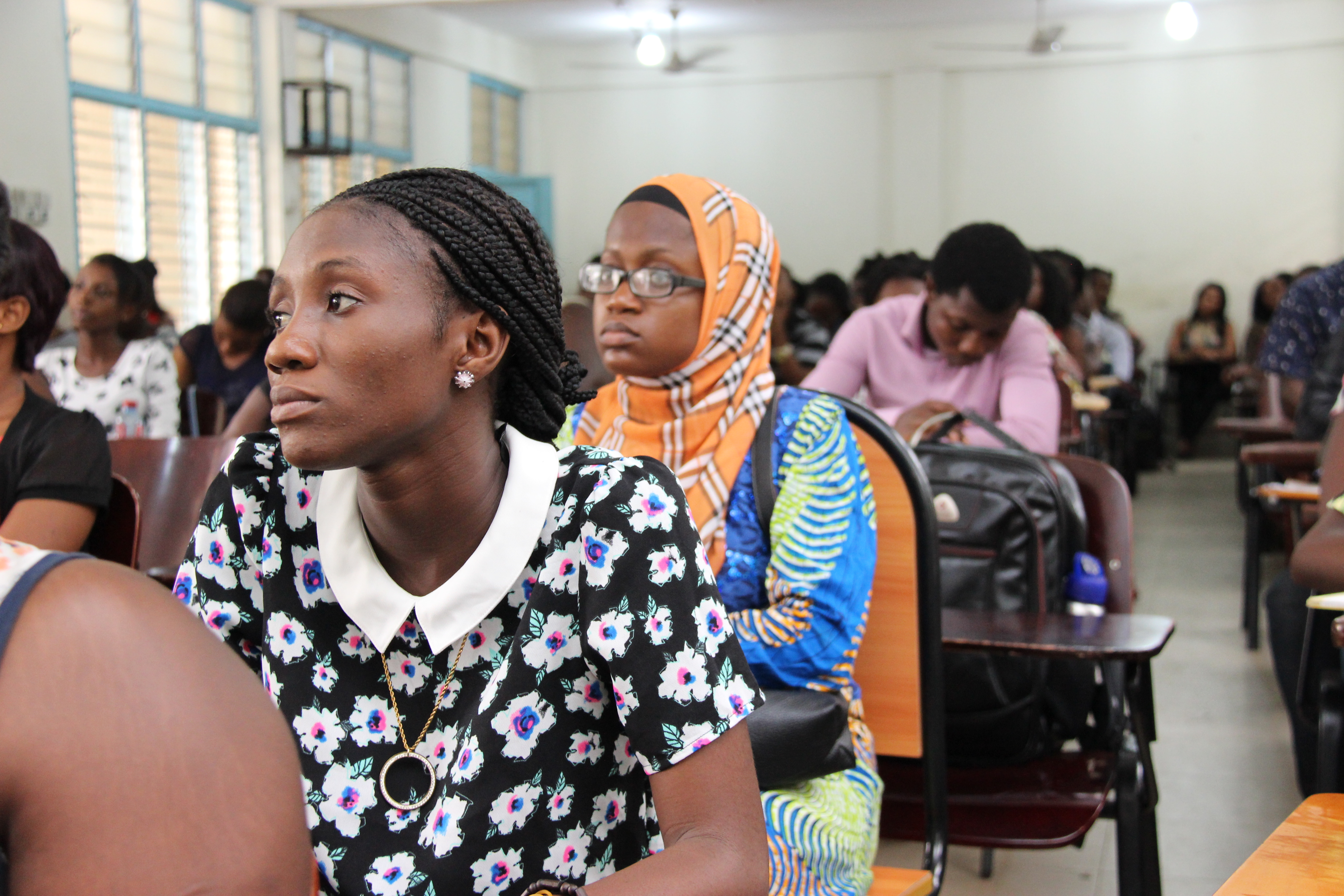
Participants of a Wikipedia presentation at GIJ in 2017

The University of Media, Arts and Communication-Institute of Journalism (UniMAC-IJ), formerly the Ghana Institute of Journalism (GIJ), is a public university in Ghana. The University is a merger of the erstwhile Ghana Institute of Journalism, the National Film and Television Institute, established and the Ghana Institute of Languages. The institute is accredited by the National Accreditation Board.

UniMAC-IJ has campuses in Accra at Ringway, Osu, and North Dzorwulu.

UniMAC-IJ is connected to a religious non-denominational Christian group known as Campus Christian Family (CCF)and has the GIJ chapter, where services are held on both campuses.

== History ==
The Ghana Institute of Journalism was established on 16 October 1959 (66 years ago) by Kwame Nkrumah, the first president of Ghana. The school was formally called the School of Journalism and was a department at the Accra Technical Institute (now Accra Technical University). The first principal and journalism tutor was Richard McMillan. The university's library is named in his honour.

The school became the Ghana Institute of Journalism in 1974 (52 years ago). The school received its presidential charter establishing it as a university in 2009. Ghana Institute of Journalism (GIJ), National Films and Television Institute (NAFTI), and Ghana Institute of Languages (GIL) were merged as a University by an act of Parliament (Act 1059) in 2022.

== Chancellor and Vice Chancellor ==
Name Eric Opoku Mensah 2024	Duration
Kwamena Kwansah-Aidoo	2018–2022
Modestus Fosu	2018
W.S.K Dzisah	2014–2018
David Newton	2009–2014
Kweku Rockson	2006–2009
David Newton	1993–2006
Kojo Yankah	1984–1993
Kwame Duffour	1983–1984
Kabral Blay Amihere	1982–1983
R. Quartey	1979–1982
G. F. Dove	1973–1978
Fred Agyeman	1969–1973
Martin Tay	1968–1969
W.G. Smith	1965–1966
Cecil Forde	1963–1965
Sam Arthur	1962–1963

The University is in the face of a transition

The Richard McMillan Library

== Programmes ==
The school runs Diploma, Bachelor of Arts, and Masters programmes.

- The Diploma Programme is a two-year programme consisting of communication, social sciences, and arts subjects.
- The Bachelor of Arts programme is a four-year programme with options of specializing in either Journalism or Public Relations.
- The Masters Programmes is a one-year programme with options to specialize in Public Relations, Journalism, Media Management, and Development Communication.
- A two-year B.A. in Communication Studies Top-Up Programme for Diploma graduates.

== Faculties/Departments ==
- Faculty of Integrated Communication Sciences
- Faculty of Journalism & Media Studies
- Faculty of Public Relations, Advertising & Integrated Marketing
- School of Graduate Studies and Research (SoGSaR)
- School of Alternative Learning

== Controversies ==
The management of the university was labeled as "insensitive" to the hardship caused by the COVID-19 pandemic, after the school increased its facility user fees for the 2020/21 academic year. It led to a protest on social media and the decision was later reversed.

The management of the institution asked students who paid their fees late to defer their courses for the academic year. The students protested and accused the management as "unfair" and "insensitive" as they were not aware of the consequences. Some students were denied access to the two campuses of the institution. The management later allowed the students to register for their end-of-semester exams.

== Amnesty for non-graduating students ==
In November 2020, students who had not been able to graduate since 2013, were given the opportunity by the academic board to register and complete their programmes. This was to be done within three years.

== See also ==
- List of universities in Ghana
