= RTP Awards =

Annual radio and television awards ceremony in Ghana

Radio and Television Personality Awards
- Awarded for: Excellence in Ghanaian radio and television
- Country: Ghana
- Presented by: Big Events Ghana
- First award: 2011

The Radio and Television Personality (RTP) Awards are an annual awards ceremony for radio and television in Ghana.

The RTP Awards, organized by Big Events Ghana, were first announced in January 2011. The first RTP awards were held in June 2011 at the Banquet Hall, State House, Accra. The event was hosted by Ama K. Abebrese and Felix Vander Pullin.

The 9th edition, hosted by actor James Gardiner and talk show host Cookie Tee, was held at the Accra International Conference Centre on October 12 2019.
