= GHOne TV =

Ghanaian television station

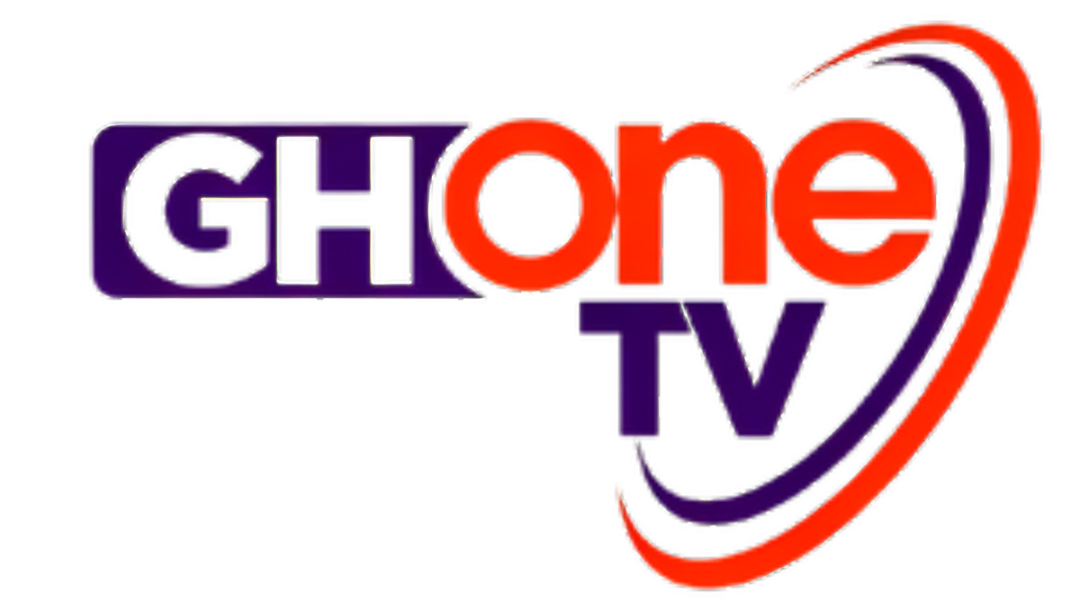
- Type: Private
- Industry: Media
- Headquarters: Platinum Place, Ridge, Accra,
- Parent: EIB Network

GHOne TV is a Ghana-based entertainment TV channel, whose content includes lifestyle, music, fashion, series, children's programs, comedy, and tourism. It is now owned by Excellence In Broadcasting (EIB) Networks, which has broadcaster Bola Ray, as its CEO. The station was formerly owned by Charter House Productions. According to a survey conducted by GeoPoll, GHOne is the 5th most watched TV station in Ghana. Nana Yaa Serwaa Sarpong is the current General Manager of the station She took after Nana Aba Anamoah who was promoted to Group Head of Business Development for the mother company Excellence In Broadcasting (EIB) Network.

== Summary ==
GHOne TV is a Ghanaian television station that offers a mix of news, entertainment, and lifestyle programming. Based in Accra, it is part of the EIB Network, a media conglomerate in Ghana that also owns Starr FM (Ghana), Kasapa FM, Agoo TV and several other media outlets. GHOne TV is known for its engaging talk shows, dramas, reality shows, and news programming. It has built a reputation for addressing social issues, airing investigative reports, and promoting local content that resonates with a broad audience in Ghana. Some of its flagship shows include GHOne News Tonight, Gen Z Manifesto and “Rhythmz Live.”

== Original Programming ==
- GHOne Newsroom
- GHOne News Tonight
- State of Affairs
- Rhythmz Live
- Toast
- Duvet
- The Game
- Starr Chat
- Gen Z Manifesto
- Election Hub (during election years in Ghana)
- Focus on Africa (from BBC News)
- GHToday
