= Issah Adam Yakubu =

Ghanaian soldier and Chief of Naval Staff of the Ghana Navy

Issah Yakubu
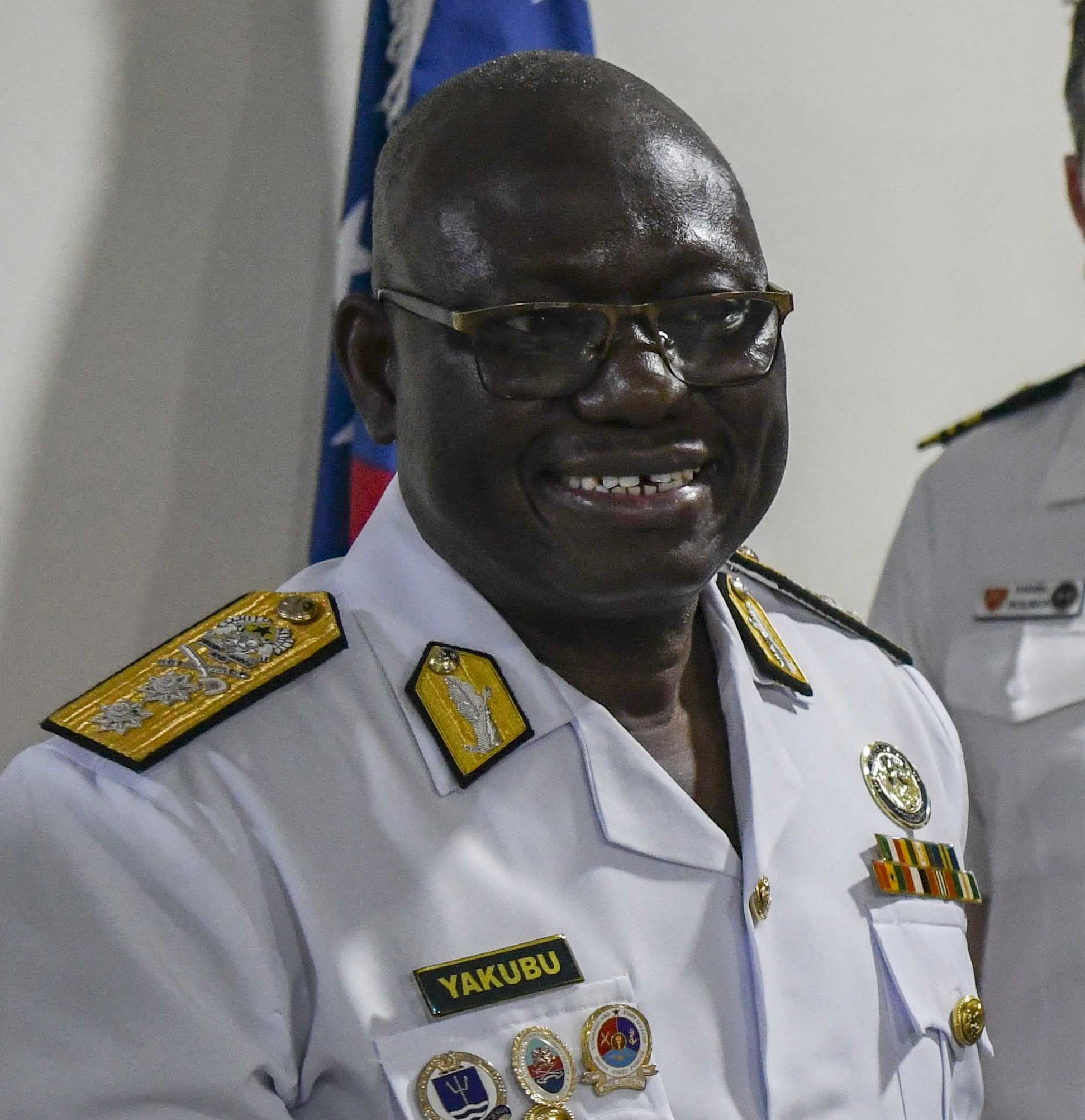
- Born: March 10, 1965 (age 61); Tamale, Northern Region, Ghana
- Education: Ghana Military Academy; Armed Forces Command and Staff College (AFCSC); Salve Regina University; Ghana Institute of Management and Public Administration
- Military career
- Branch: Ghana Navy
- Service years: 1991–present
- Rank: Rear admiral
- Commands: Chief of Naval Staff

Vice Admiral Issah Adam Yakubu (born 10 March 1965) is a Ghanaian military officer currently serving as the Chief of the Naval Staff (CNS) of the Ghana Navy. He assumed the position on 5 February 2021, following his appointment by then President of Ghana and Commander-in-Chief of the Ghana Armed Forces. Vice Admiral Yakubu was confirmed as the 18th Chief of the Naval Staff by then President on 4 March 2021.

== Early life and education ==
Yakubu was born on 10 March 1965 in Tamale, in the Northern Region of Ghana. He completed his Ordinary Level and Advanced Level Certificates at the Tamale Secondary School (now Tamale Senior High School) in 1984 and 1986, respectively. In 1987, he enlisted in the Ghana Armed Forces and underwent training at the Ghana Military Academy as part of Regular Career Course Intake 29. He was commissioned into the Ghana Navy as an Executive officer in 1991.

Yakubu furthered his education with various courses and programs both in Ghana and abroad. He completed the International Midshipmen and International Sub-Lieutenants Courses at the Britannia Royal Naval College, Dartmouth, and the School of Maritime Operations, Portsmouth, in the United Kingdom. In 1996, he attended the Junior Staff Course at the Armed Forces Command and Staff College (AFCSC) in Nigeria. He later completed his Senior Command and Staff Course at the Ghana Armed Forces Command and Staff College (GAFCSC) in Accra, where he emerged as the best Naval student. He also attended courses at the Naval War College in Rhode Island, US, the Coast Guard Training Centre in Virginia, USA, and the Resilience Centre of Cranefield University, UK.

Yakubu holds a Master of Arts Degree in International Relations from Salve Regina University in the United States and a Post-graduate Diploma in Public Administration from the Ghana Institute of Management and Public Administration.

== Military career ==
After his commissioning into the Ghana Navy in 1991, Yakubu held various appointments throughout his career. He served as an Administrative Officer at the Naval Base Sekondi and as a Watch-Keeping Officer on board Ghana Navy Ships (GNSs) ACHIMOTA and YOGAGA. He also served as the Executive Officer on GNS SEBO. During this period, he participated in the military intervention in Liberia and Sierra Leone as part of the ECOWAS Ceasefire Monitoring Group (ECOMOG).

He later served as the Officer-in-Charge of the Communications School at the Basic and Leadership Training School at the Naval Base in Tema and as the Officer-in-Charge of Naval Cadet Training at the Regional maritime academy. In 2001, he became the first Executive Officer of GNS ANZONE and sailed the ship on its maiden voyage from Alaska, USA, to Ghana. He also served as a Military Observer with the United Nations Mission in Ethiopia and Eritrea (UNMEE) and as the Commanding Officer of GNS ANZONE.

Yakubu held instructional positions as a Directing Staff at the Ghana Armed Forces Command and Staff College (GAFCSC) in Accra and at the Armed Forces Command and Staff College (AFCSC) in Nigeria. He also served as the Chief Instructor of the Naval Faculty at GAFCSC. In 2011, he commanded the ex-German Navy warship, which was later renamed GNS YAA ASANTEWAA, and sailed it on its maiden voyage from Germany to Ghana.

Yakubu has also held several staff appointments at the Naval Headquarters, including Director of Naval Administration and Acting Chief Staff Officer. In May 2017, he was promoted to the substantive rank of Commodore and appointed as the Chief Staff Officer. He later served as Ghana's Defence Attaché to London, UK, before assuming the position of Chief of Staff at the General Headquarters of the Ghana Armed Forces.

Yakubu assumed command as Chief of the Naval Staff on 4 March 2021. He was succeeded by Rear Admiral Godwin Livinus Bessing on 24 March 2025.

== Achievements and honours ==
Throughout his career, Yakubu has received numerous awards and honours. He has been recognized for his exceptional performance and professionalism on various international courses and peacekeeping operations. Notably, he was awarded the Rear Admiral Joseph C. Strasser International Leadership Prize during his attendance at the Naval War College in Rhode Island, US. He has also been honoured with medals for his participation in peace operations such as the ECOWAS Ceasefire Monitoring Group (ECOMOG) in Liberia and the United Nations Mission in Ethiopia and Eritrea (UNMEE).

== Personal life ==
Yakubu is married and has children. In his leisure time, he enjoys reading, swimming, and playing golf.

== Publications ==
Yakubu is an avid researcher and has authored numerous papers on maritime security and strategy. He is also a co-author and co-editor of the official history of the Ghana Navy, titled History of the Ghana Navy: A Case for a Credible Naval Force for National Development.

== See also ==
- Ghana Navy
- Chief of Naval Staff (Ghana)
- Ghana Armed Forces

Military offices
Preceded by Seth Amoama	Chief of Naval Staff; 4 March 2021 &–	Succeeded by Seth Amoama
