= Stephen Obimpeh =

Ghanaian politician

Hon. Stephen Obimpeh

Member of parliament for North Dayi
- In office 7 January 1993 – 6 January 2001
- Preceded by: Parliament suspended
- Succeeded by: Akua Sena Dansua

Chief of Naval Staff
- In office June 1979 – December 1981
- Preceded by: Commander Ken Dadzie
- Succeeded by: Captain J. W. Boateng

Personal details
- Born: Stephen George Obimpeh; 26 September 1941 (age 85) North Dayi, Volta Region Ghana
- Party: National Democratic Congress
- Education: Ghana Military Academy
- Occupation: Politician
- Profession: Navy Officer

Commodore Stephen Obimpeh is a Ghanaian politician and former officer in the Ghana Navy. He served as Chief of Naval Staff of the Ghana Navy from June 1979 to December 1981. formal minister of Agriculture as well as formal minister of Health.

== Early life and education ==
He was born on 26 September 1941 at Vakpo in the Volta Region of Ghana. He had his primary education at Vakpo and his secondary education at the Ghana Secondary Technical School (GSTS) in Takoradi. He was admitted in the Ghana Military Academy in 1961 and was further trained at the Britannia Royal Naval College Dartmouth, U.K. He was commissioned into the Ghana Armed Forces in 1963. He got a master's degree in Maritime Strategy and Management at the Naval Command Course, Naval War College, Newport, Rhode Island in the United States of America in 1978.

== Career ==
Stephen Obimpeh is a former member of the first and second parliament of the fourth republic of Ghana. He served for North Dayi constituency. He is a Naval Officer. He is a President of the Association of Retired Naval Officers.

== Political life ==
From 1986 to 1992 he served as the PNDC Secretary for Agriculture. From 1993 to 2000 he served as the Member of Parliament for North Dayi constituency in the parliament of Ghana during which time he served as the chairman of the Finance Select Committee of the Ghanaian Parliament. He also served as the Ghanaian Minister for Health from 1993 to 1996. He again served as Minister of Agriculture from 1996 to 1997.

During the 2000 election campaign in Ghana, he was appointed as campaign manager for the election Campaign of John Evans Atta Mills who lost the election to the John Kufuor. Atta Mills later won the election in 2008 but died as president on 24 July 2012.

He later served as senior presidential advisor at the Office of the President of Ghana. He also served on various boards including as Chairman of the Public Procurement Authority and chairman of the governing board of the Veterans Administration. He also served on other boards including Ghana Railways and Ports Authority (1972–1973), Ghana Armed Forces Staff College Control Board (1979–1981), Ghana Nautical College Council (1978–1981) and Board of Governors World Maritime University, Malmo, Sweden (1983–1994)

=== Member of parliament ===
Stephen Obimpeh was first elected as member of the first parliament of the fourth republic on the ticket of the National Democratic Congress during the 1992 Ghanaian parliamentary election. He represented again in 1996 Ghanaian general election which he won the seat with 39,445 votes representing 91.7% of the share. He defeated Vincent Wilson Bulla of the People's Convention Party who obtained 2,634 votes representing 6.1% of the share and Augustine Yawo Adjei of the New Patriotic Party who obtained 944 votes representing 2.2% of the share. He lost the seat in 2000 Ghanaian general election to Akua Sena Dansua of the National Democratic Congress who won the seat with 23,962 votes out of 32,785 total valid votes cast. This was equivalent to 73.8% of the total valid votes cast.

== Honours ==
He was made a Companion of the Order of the Volta in 2016 for his contribution to the development of the country.

In 2019, During the celebration of the West African Security Services Association (WASSA), Obimpeh urging the maritime personnel to stay on the right side of the law all the time, he now gave a call on the personnel and officers to continue to work tirelessly to keep Ghana's maritime domain safe and secure.

In 2014, He supported VASEC, a secondary School at his town in the Volta Region.

== Personal life ==
He is a Christian.

Military offices
Preceded by Commander Ken Dadzie	Chief of Naval Staff; Jun 1979 – Dec 1981	Succeeded by Captain J. W. Boateng
