= Benjamin Ohene-Kwapong =

Ghanaian military officer

Rear Admiral Benjamin Ohene-Kwapong was a Ghanaian naval personnel and served in the Ghana Navy. He served as Chief of Naval Staff of the Ghana Navy from July 1985 to June 1990.

Military offices
Preceded by J. K. Oppong	Chief of Naval Staff; Jul 1985 – Jun 1990	Succeeded by Tom Annan
