= Seth Amoama =

Ghanaian chief of Naval staff

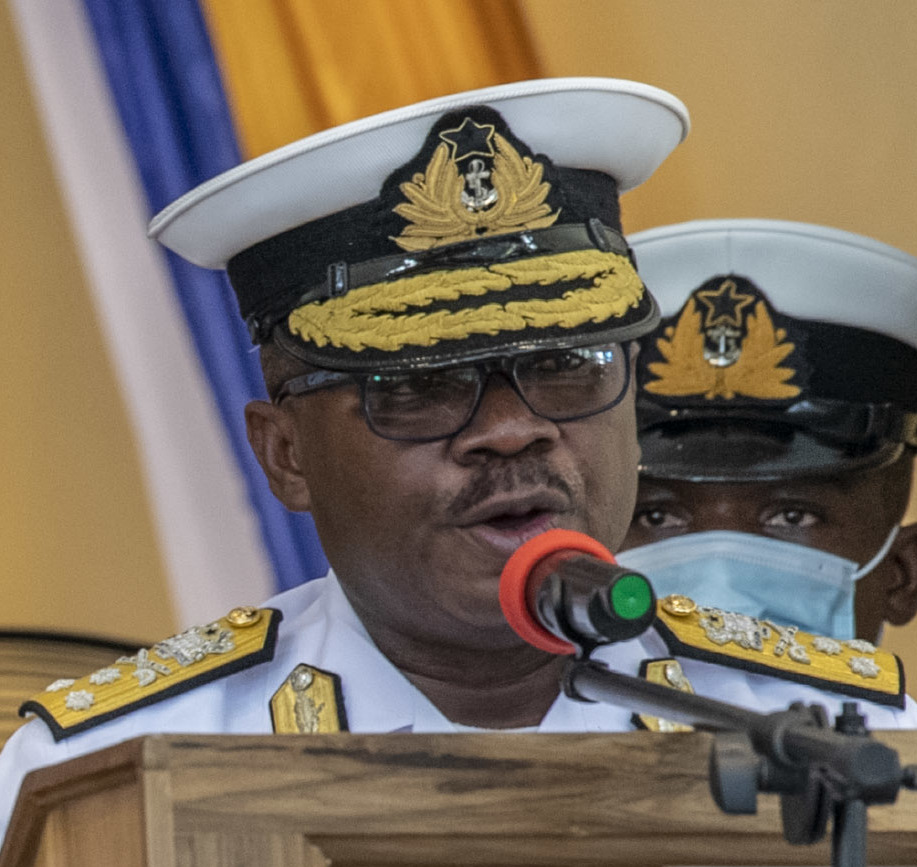
- Amoama in 2021
- Born: 18 March 1959 (age 67)
- Education: Naval War College; Rhode Island | University of Ibadan
- Military career
- Allegiance: Ghana Armed Forces
- Branch: Ghana Navy
- Service years: 1981 to 2024
- Rank: Vice Admiral
- Commands: Chief of the Defence Staff; Commandant, Ghana Armed Forces Command & Staff College; Flag Officer Commanding, Eastern Naval Command

Vice Admiral Seth Amoama (born 1959) was the Chief of the Defence Staff of the Ghana Armed Forces. He was appointed by President Akufo Addo in January 2021 and retired effective January 2024. He replaced Lieutenant General Obed Akwa, who retired at the start of February 2021. Prior to that he was the Chief of Naval Staff of the Ghana Navy appointed since 2019.

== Early life and education ==
Vice Admiral Seth Amoama, had his secondary school education at Oda Secondary School for his GCSE O, Levels and proceeded to Presbyterian Boys' Senior High School for his A, Levels. He was enlisted into the Ghana Armed Forces as a Naval Cadet in 1981 and had his initial training at the Ghana Military Academy (GMA). While at GMA, he was sent to the Pakistan Naval Academy on 1 August 1982, to continue with his training and was commissioned into the Executive Branch of the Ghana Navy in December 1984. He was a proud winner of the sword of honour on graduation in Pakistan.

Vice Admiral Amoama's military training and qualifications include; International Sub-Lieutenant Course at Britannia Royal Naval College, Dartmouth, UK. He attended the Ghana Armed Forces Command and Staff Courses both Junior and Senior Divisions at Teshie, Accra and was the best all-round graduate on both courses. He was a member of the Naval Staff Course, Class 53 at US Naval War College, Newport Rhode Island graduating with distinction. He graduated from the Nigerian Defence College in August 2013 as the best all-round graduate.

The Chief of the Defense Staff is an alumnus of the Galilee Institute of Management in Israel and holds a Master of Science Degree in Strategic Studies from the Political Science Department of University of Ibadan, Nigeria.

== Career ==
He has held numerous appointments in the Ghana Armed Forces both afloat and ashore. He was the Watch Keeping Officer onboard Ghana Navy Ships SEBO, ACHIMOTA and YOGAGA at different times in his career. He also served as Commanding Officer onboard Ghana Navy Ships DZATA (Oct 91 – Feb 94) and ACHIMOTA (Jul 08 – Mar 09).

Between March 2002 and March 2003, the Chief of the Defense Staff served as Directing Staff at the Junior and later Senior Division of the Ghana Armed Forces Command & Staff College. He was later seconded to the United Nations Headquarters as Military Planning Officer at the Department of Peacekeeping Operations from February 2005 to May 2008. Vice Admiral Amoama was the Director of Administration at the Naval Headquarters (1 Apr 09 – 31 Jul 13), Military Assistant to the Chief of the Defence Staff (1 Aug 13 – 31 Jul 14) and later the Chief Staff Officer at the Naval Headquarters (1 August 14 – 28 February 16). He also served as the Flag Officer Commanding, Eastern Naval Command from 1 Mar 16 to Jun 16. Until his appointment as the Chief of the Naval Staff, he was the Commandant of the Ghana Armed Forces Command & Staff College from 1 July 2016 to 3 January 2019.

Vice Admiral Amoama has some peacekeeping experience, having served as UN Military Observer in Rwanda (1995–1996), UN Liaison Officer in Lebanon (1997–1998), and UN Staff Officer in Sierra Leone (2001–2002). Vice Admiral Amoama was appointed as High Commissioner to Nigeria on June 24, 2024.

== Personal life ==
He is married to Victoria with three children. He likes music and flowers.

Military offices
Preceded by Lt. Gen. Obed Akwa	Chief of the Defence Staff; 2021 to 2024	Succeeded by Maj. Gen. Thomas Oppong-Peprah
Preceded by Rear Admiral Faidoo	Chief of Naval Staff; 2018-2021	Succeeded by Rear Admiral Yakubu
