= A. R. S. Nunoo =

Ghanaian Chief of Naval Staff from 2004 to 2009

A. R. S. Nuno
- Military career
- Allegiance: Ghana
- Rank: Rear Admiral
- Commands: Chief of the Defence Staff

Rear Admiral Arthur Riby Sampa Nuno is a retired Ghanaian military officer. He served as Chief of Naval Staff of the Ghana Navy from May 2005 to March 2009 and as the acting Chief of Defence Staff of the Ghana Armed Forces from 28 January 2009 to 31 March 2009.

Military offices
Preceded by Lieutenant General Joseph Boateng Danquah	Chief of Defence Staff; 2009	Succeeded by Lieutenant General Peter Blay
Preceded by John Gbenah	Chief of Naval Staff; May 2005 – Mar 2009	Succeeded by Matthew Quashie
