= J. K. Oppong =

Sailor in the Ghana Navy

Commodore J. K. Oppong was a Ghanaian sailor and served in the Ghana Navy. He served as Chief of Naval Staff of the Ghana Navy from March 1982 to July 1985.

Military offices
Preceded by J. W. Boateng	Chief of Naval Staff; Mar 1982 – Jul 1985	Succeeded by Benjamin Ohene-Kwapong
