= Chief of Naval Staff (Ghana) =

Ghanaian navy heads

Chief of the Naval staff
- Naval Ensign of Ghana
- Incumbent; Rear Admiral Godwin Livinus Bessing since 24 March 2025
- Ghana Navy
- Style: Admiral/Sir
- Reports to: Chief of Defence
- Seat: Navy HQ, Burma Camp
- Appointer: President of Ghana
- Term length: No fixed length
- Formation: January 1959
- First holder: D. A. Foreman

The Chief of the Naval Staff is the head of the Naval operations and the administrative head in the Ghana Navy. The current Chief of Naval Staff is Rear Admiral Godwin Livinus Bessing.

== List of officeholders ==
No.	Picture	Chief of Naval Staff	Took office	Left office	Time in office	Ref.
1	D. A. Foreman	Commodore; D. A. Foreman (1910–1967)	Jan 1959	Jun 1961	2 years, 5 months	
2	David Animle Hansen	Rear Admiral; David Animle Hansen (1923–2008); First Ghanaian Chief of Naval Staff	Sep 1961	Jun 1967	5 years, 9 months	
3	Michael Otu	Air Vice Marshal; Michael Otu (1925–2006)	Jun 1967	Mar 1968	9 months	
4	Philemon Quaye	Commodore; Philemon Quaye (1924–2010)	Apr 1968	May 1972	4 years, 1 month	
5	Joy Amedume	Commodore; Joy Amedume (?–1979)	May 1972	Jan 1973	8 months	
6	Chemogoh Kevin Dzang	Commodore; Chemogoh Kevin Dzang (1941–2009)	Feb 1973	Aug 1974	1 year, 6 months	
7	G. Bedu-Addo	Commodore; G. Bedu-Addo	Aug 1974	Jul 1975	10 months	
(6)	Chemogoh Kevin Dzang	Rear Admiral; Chemogoh Kevin Dzang (1941–2009)	Jul 1975	Jun 1977	1 year, 11 months	
(5)	Joy Amedume	Rear Admiral; Joy Amedume (?–1979)	Jun 1977	Jun 1979	2 years	
8	Ken Dadzie	Commander; Ken Dadzie	Jun 1979	Jun 1979	0 months	
9	Stephen Obimpeh	Commodore; Stephen Obimpeh (born 1941)	Jun 1979	Dec 1981	2 years, 5 months	
10	J. W. Boateng	Captain; J. W. Boateng	Jan 1982	Mar 1982	2 months	
11	J. K. Oppong	Commodore; J. K. Oppong	Mar 1982	Jul 1985	3 years, 4 months	
12	Benjamin Ohene-Kwapong	Rear Admiral; Benjamin Ohene-Kwapong	Jul 1985	Jun 1990	4 years, 11 months	
13	Tom Annan	Rear Admiral; Tom Annan	Jun 1990	Sept 1996	6 years, 3 months	
14	E. O. Owusu-Ansah	Vice Admiral; E. O. Owusu-Ansah	Oct 1996	Mar 2001	4 years, 6 months	
15	John Gbenah	Rear Admiral; John Gbenah	Mar 2001	June 2005	4 years, 3 months	
16	Arthur Nunoo	Rear Admiral; Arthur Nunoo	May 2005	Mar 2009	3 years, 10 months	
17	Matthew Quashie	Rear Admiral; Matthew Quashie (1951–2020)	Apr 2009	Mar 2013	3 years, 11 months	
18	Geoffrey Mawuli Biekro	Rear Admiral; Geoffrey Mawuli Biekro (born 1952)	Mar 2013	15 January 2016	2 years, 10 months	
19	Peter Faidoo	Rear Admiral; Peter Faidoo	15 January 2016	21 December 2018	2 years, 11 months	
20	Seth Amoama	Rear Admiral; Seth Amoama	21 December 2018	5 February 2021	2 years, 1 month	
21	Issah Yakubu	Vice Admiral; Issah Yakubu	5 February 2021	24 March 2025	5 years, 7 months	
22	Godwin Livinus Bessing	Rear Admiral; Godwin Livinus Bessing	24 March 2025	Incumbent	1 year, 5 months	
