= Tom Annan =

Rear Admiral Tom Annan was a Ghanaian naval personnel and served in the Ghana Navy. He served as Chief of Naval Staff of the Ghana Navy from June 1990 to September 1996.

Military offices
Preceded by Benjamin Ohene-Kwapong	Chief of Naval Staff; Jun 1990 – Sept 1996	Succeeded by E. O. Owusu-Ansah
