= J. W. Boateng =

Captain J. W. Boateng was a Ghanaian naval personnel and served in the Ghana Navy. He served as Chief of Naval Staff of the Ghana Navy from January 1982 to March 1982.

Military offices
Preceded by Stephen Obimpeh	Chief of Naval Staff; Jan 1982 – Mar 1982	Succeeded by J. K. Oppong
