= E. O. Owusu-Ansah =

Vice Admiral E. O. Owusu-Ansah is a Ghanaian naval personnel and served in the Ghana Navy. He served as Chief of Naval Staff of the Ghana Navy from October 1996 to March 2001.

Military offices
Preceded by Tom Annan	Chief of Naval Staff; Oct 1996 – Mar 2001	Succeeded by John Gbenah
