= Ken Dadzie =

- Born: Ghana
- Military career
- Allegiance: Ghana
- Branch: Ghana Navy
- Rank: Commander
- Commands: Chief of Naval Staff

Commander Ken Dadzie was a Ghanaian soldier and a member of the Ghana Navy. He served as Chief of Naval Staff of the Ghana Navy from 6 June 1979 until July 1979 when he was replaced by Commodore Stephen Obimpeh.

== See also ==
- Ghana Navy
- Chief of Naval Staff (Ghana)
