= John Gbenah =

Rear Admiral John Kozo Gbenah was a Ghanaian naval personnel and served in the Ghana Navy. He served as Chief of Naval Staff of the Ghana Navy from March 2001 to June 2005. He also served an acting CDS under President Kuffour’s tenure. After his retirement, he became Ghana’s ambassador to Zimbabwe between 2006-2009. He is a native of Kpedze todze in the Volta Region of Ghana.

Military offices
Preceded by E. O. Owusu-Ansah	Chief of Naval Staff; Mar 2001 – June 2005	Succeeded by Arthur Nuno
