= David Animle Hansen =

Ghanaian naval officer

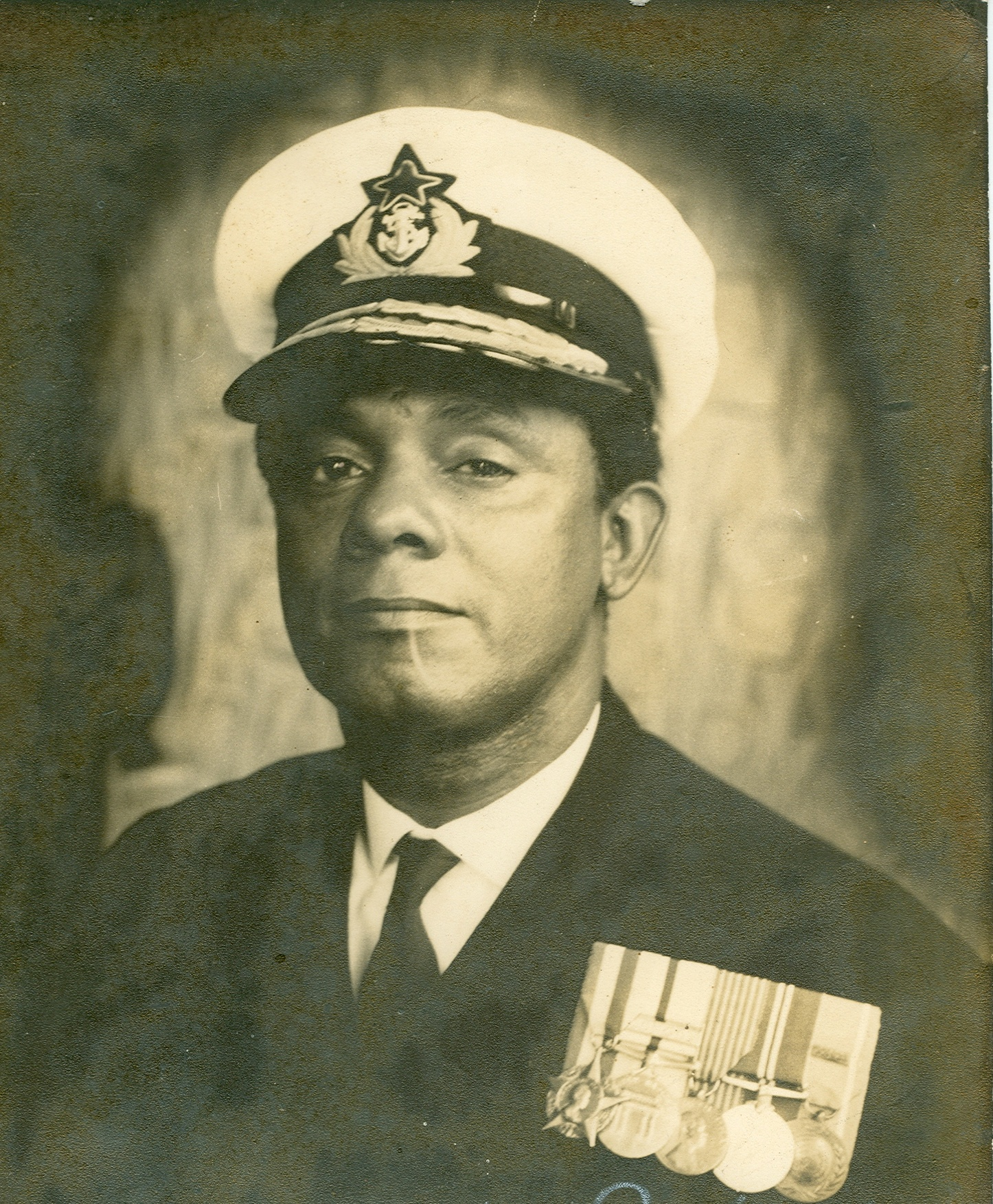
- Rear Admiral David Hansen
- Born: 17 May 1923; Ghana
- Died: 28 January 2008 (aged 84)
- Military career
- Allegiance: Ghana
- Branch: Ghana Navy
- Rank: Rear Admiral
- Commands: Chief of Naval Staff
- Known for: First Ghanaian Chief of the Naval Staff

Rear Admiral David Animle Hansen (17 May 1923 – 28 January 2008) was a Ghanaian naval officer who served as Chairman of the Greater Accra Regional Administrative Committee from 1966 to 1967 in the National Liberation Council regime and as Commander of the Ghana Navy from 1962 to 1967. He was the first Ghanaian to be appointed head of the Ghana Navy. He was also the founding director of the National Vocational Training Institute (NVTI), and held this office from 1970 to 1980.

== Early life and education ==
David Hansen was born on May 17, 1923, in Jamestown, Accra, to John William Kojo Hansen and Joanna Nora Hansen. He began schooling at Accra Royal School and continued to the Osu Presbyterian Senior School. He had his high school education at Accra Academy where he graduated in 1942.

Hansen worked briefly at Ghana Post before enlisting into the army two years after his high school graduation. Hansen trained at the Eaton Hall Officer Cadet School in the United Kingdom in 1950.

In 1951, he attended the platoon weapon training course at Hythe in Kent. Hansen underwent the platoon commander's course at Warminster in 1954 and the following year trained at the Infantry Signal School. In 1959, Hansen was enrolled and trained at Staff College, Camberley.

== Military career ==
Following his secondary education and brief work experience, he enlisted in the Gold Coast Regiment in 1944. On January 20, 1951, Hansen was commissioned a lieutenant in the Royal West African Frontier Force after a training course. In 1958, he became one of the first officers of the Ghana Regiment, when the Gold Coast gained independence.

In 1960, he was made a grade II staff officer in the Office of the Chief of General Staff at the army headquarters. He was made responsible for organizing the expansion of the Ghana Army in 1960. Hansen was also appointed Secretary to the Chiefs of Staff Committee before being later appointed military assistant to the president. He consequently moved to the Flagstaff House to work as military assistant to Kwame Nkrumah.

In July 1960, Hansen was appointed Lieutenant Colonel and posted to the Third Battalion in Congo which he commanded until January 1961. During his command of the Third Battalion in Congo, he was recalled to accompany President Kwame Nkrumah to the United Nations in New York. He was then selected to transfer from the Ghana Army, to be an officer of the new Ghana Navy under A. G. Forman.

In September 1961, Hansen was appointed as the first Ghanaian Commander of the Ghana Navy with the rank of Commodore.

In 1966, after Nkrumah's overthrow, the National Liberation Council appointed Hansen as Chairman of its Greater Accra Regional Administrative Committee. In 1967, Hansen was re-assigned as Military Attache to Ghana's High Commission in Britain. In March 1970, he retired from the Ghana Navy with the flag rank of Rear Admiral.

== Honours ==
The Ghana Navy ship GNS Hansen was named after him.

Military offices
Preceded by Commodore D. A. Foreman	Chief of Naval Staff; September 1961 – June 1967	Succeeded by Air Vice Marshal Michael Otu
