= A. G. Forman =

British naval officer (1910–1967)

Commodore A. G. Forman CBE
- Military career
- Allegiance: United Kingdom; Ghana
- Branch: Royal Navy; Ghana Navy
- Rank: Commodore
- Commands: Chief of Naval Staff

Archibald George Forman CBE (1910–1967) was a British naval officer who became the first Chief of Naval Staff of the Ghana Navy.

== Ghana Navy service ==
Forman was born in Brentford on 20 June 1910. At age 17, he was an acting sub-lieutenant in the Royal Navy. In 1931, he became a sub-lieutenant and promoted as a lieutenant two years after (1933). In 1941, he became Lieutenant Commander and commanded HMS Airdale and HMS Lookout (G32). He was mentioned in dispatches in 1942, and became a Commander at the end of 1943, where he commanded HMS Garth (L20). In 1950, he was made Commodore. Retiring from active Navy service in July 1959, he was seconded to the newly created Ghana Navy. Kwame Nkrumah, then the Ghana president, granted him a presidential commission as a Ghana naval officer with the rank of Commodore and appointed him Chief of Naval Staff. This was after the navy had been established in 1959.

After Nkrumah assumed the title of Supreme Commander in September, he replaced Commodore Forman with Lieutenant-Colonel Daniel Hansen. As Captain A. G. Forman he received a CBE in 1962.

Military offices
Preceded by Ghana Navy established 1959	Chief of Naval Staff; 1959 – 1961	Succeeded by David Animle Hansen
