= Ghana Military Academy =

Military academy in Ghana

Ghana Military Academy (GMA)
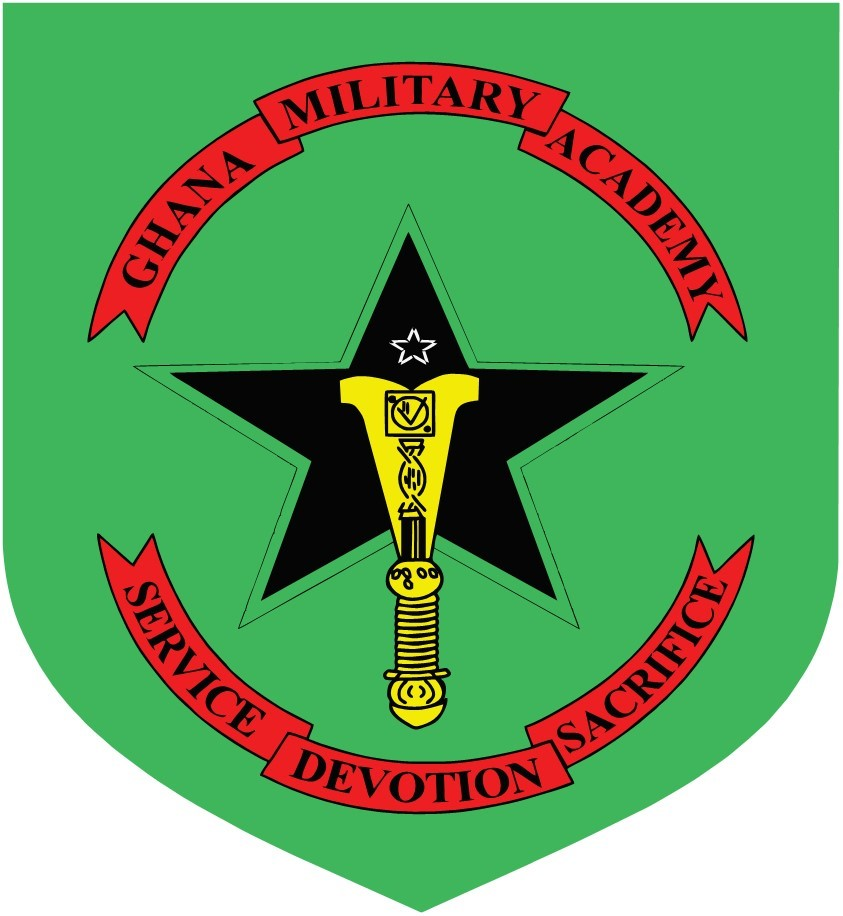
- Motto: Service·Devotion·Sacrifice
- Type: Military Academy
- Established: 1960
- Commandant: Major General Cornelius Komla Lithur
- Location: Teshie, Accra, Ghana
- Campus: Whistler Barracks
- Colors: Green and White

The Ghana Military Academy is the military academy of the Ghana Armed Forces. It offers basic military training to officer cadets from the Ghana Army, Ghana Navy and the Ghana Air Force. The academy is based in Teshie in the Greater Accra Region.

Entrance into the Ghana Military Academy is through a rigorous selection process. Eligible applicants must be Ghanaian citizens, medically fit, and possess at least a degree. The selection process involves an online application, Basic Fitness Test (BFT), Officer Leadership Test (OLT), written examination, medical screening, and interviews with senior military officers. Successful candidates undergo a comprehensive training program, lasting 15-24 months for Regular Cadets or 6-8 months for Short Service Commission, leading to their commissioning as officers in the Ghana Armed Forces. Most Ghanaian officers, as well as other men and women from overseas, are trained at the academy.

== History ==
The Ghana Military Academy (GMA) was founded on April 1, 1960, following years of dependence on foreign military academies to train Ghanaian officers for the armed forces. The Academy evolved from the Regular Officers Special Training Schools (ROSTS), which were established at MATS, Teshie, in 1953.

ROSTS provided six months of preparatory training for selected cadets from British West African colonies, including Nigeria, the Gold Coast, Sierra Leone, and The Gambia, before sending them to the UK or other countries for further officer training and commissioning. In 1961, the Ghanaian government arranged for a Joint Military Training Team from Britain and Canada to assist with training until qualified Ghanaian personnel could take over. Thus, the Academy had a combination of British, Canadian, and Ghanaian staff until this support ended in 1974.

Since then, the Academy has been staffed entirely by Ghanaians, who continue to develop capable leaders for the Ghana Armed Forces and other neighboring African nations such as Benin, Burkina Faso, Guinea, The Gambia, Liberia, Nigeria, Sierra Leone, Togo, and Uganda. Over 5,500 Ghanaian officers have graduated from the Academy since its inception, with some having retired and others currently serving in various roles within the armed forces and the broader society. The first commissioning ceremony took place on September 30, 1961, for 35 officer cadets, which included 14 from Intake 1 and 21 from Intake 2.

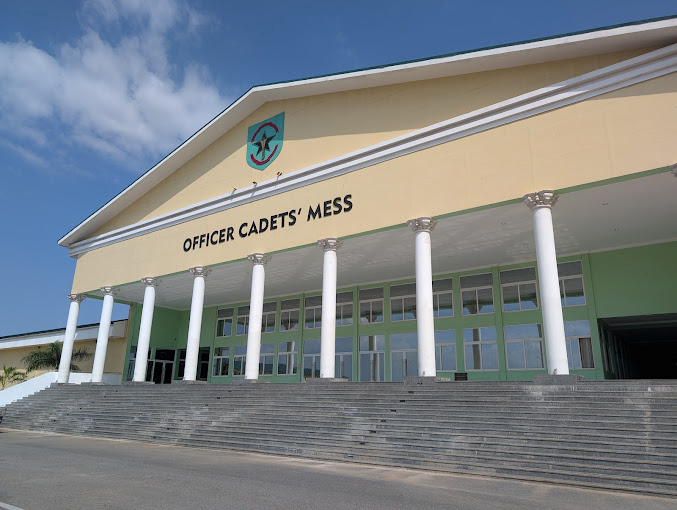
Officer Cadets' Mess of the GMA

At the request of the Ghanaian government, the British government assigned an officer at a time for two-year duty tours to help implement a revised course syllabus for the Regular Officer Training Programme. The last British Military Assistance Team officer departed in December 1994, concluding ten years of training support. The Ghana Armed Forces expresses its gratitude for the significant assistance received from the British and Canadian governments in developing the Academy into a premier training institution.

In 2010, the Academy celebrated its Golden Jubilee, marking a significant milestone with various events, culminating in a parade reviewed by His Excellency Prof. John Evans Atta Mills, President of Ghana and Commander-in-Chief of the Armed Forces. Notable attendees included three former Heads of State—Presidents Yakubu Gowon and Olusegun Obasanjo from Nigeria and President Jerry John Rawlings of Ghana, all of whom are Academy alumni.

Another important change has been the increase in educational requirements for entry into the Academy, raising the minimum qualification from a senior high school certificate to a first degree

Currently, GMA offers two courses: the Regular Career Course (RCC) and the Short Service Commission/Special Duties Course (SSC/SD). The training duration has been adjusted from 22 months to 15 months for the RCC and from 8 months to 6 months for the SSC/SD in line with this policy change. Additionally, a Special Medical Intake (SMI) is occasionally conducted to address staffing shortages in the Ghana Armed Forces Medical Services.

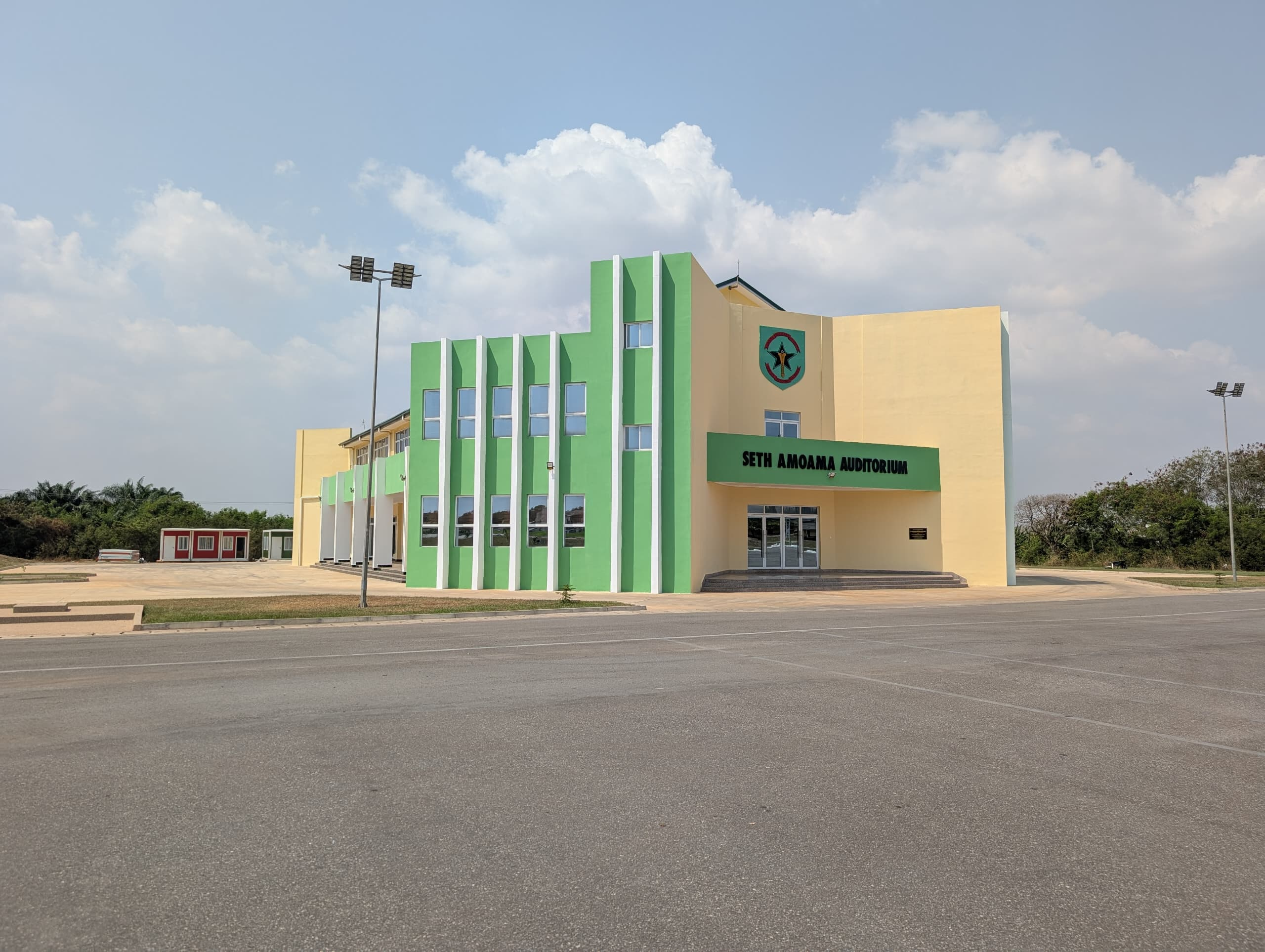
Seth Amoama Auditorium

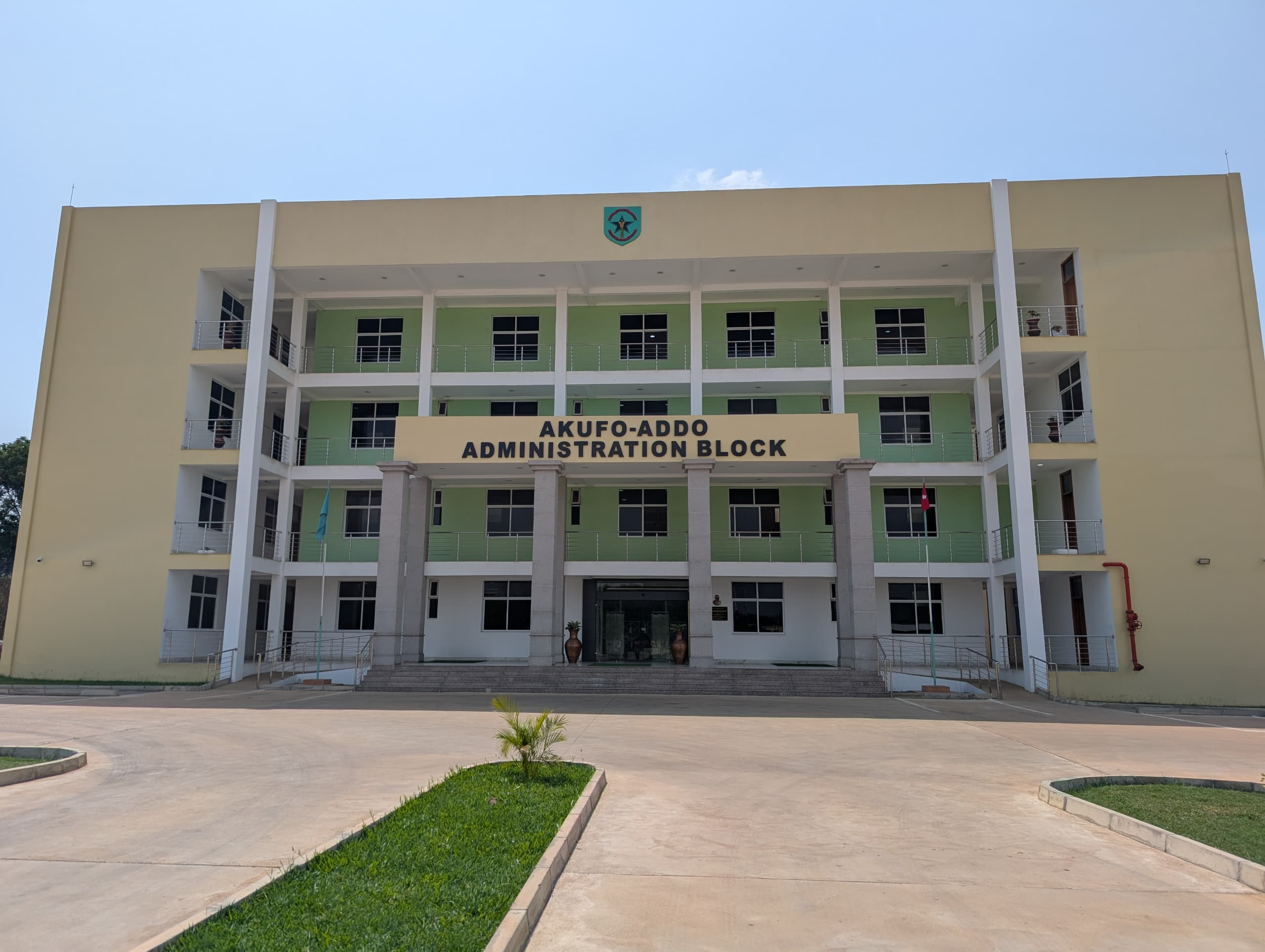
Administration Block of GMA

== Selection ==
The selection process for the Ghana Military Academy is rigorous and competitive.
Entry into the Ghana Military Academy involves meeting eligibility criteria, including citizenship, age, education, medical, and physical fitness requirements. Once eligible, candidates can apply to join the academy. Following a review of their applications, candidates are invited to sit for a written examination assessing their knowledge in math, English, and general knowledge. Successful candidates undergo a Basic Fitness Test (BFT), followed by the Outdoor Leaderless Test (OLT) to evaluate leadership potential and problem-solving skills. Those who pass then undergo medical screening to evaluate their physical fitness to ensure they meet military medical standards.
Finally, successful candidates are vetted and interviewed by the selection board to assess their leadership potential and motivation. The selection board reviews candidates' performance and selects the best candidates for admission to the Ghana Military Academy.

== Mission ==
The mission of the Ghana Military Academy is to produce leaders of character for the defence of Ghana.

== Objectives ==
1.To give the Officer Cadet a broad view of the military profession as a whole, and his responsibility as a servant of his State.

2. To develop in the Officer Cadet the spirit of patriotism, loyalty to and love for his nation.

3. To develop in the Officer Cadet the essential military characteristics of leadership and management, sense of discipline and sense of duty.

4. To develop physical fitness in the Officer Cadet.

5. To lay down the foundation of military and academic knowledge upon which the studies of future arms of Service can be built.

== Organisation Of The Academy ==
The Ghana Military Academy has in overall command a Commandant, usually an officer of the rank of Major General or equivalent. After him is a Deputy Commandant of the rank Brigadier-General (Brig-Gen) or equivalent. The Academy Sergeant Major (ASM), is a Master Warrant Officer or equivalent.

=== Organisation Of Courses ===
The Academy runs the following courses for cadets:

a. Standard Military Course (SMC) which is for 24 weeks.
The SMC is a tri-Service Course. It involves a minimum of 24 weeks of basic military training (this includes 6 weeks Induction Training referred to as Ginger Period). Cadets are required to Pass-Off the Square after completion of the induction period. The transition from SMC to RCC will be marked by a Change of Status Parade.

b. Regular Career Course (RCC) which is for 48 weeks.
The Regular Career Course (RCC) is a comprehensive training program for officer cadets at the Ghana Military Academy. Cadets undergo rigorous training averaging between 15 and 24 months which equips them with the necessary knowledge, skills, and values to become effective leaders in the Ghana Armed Forces. The curriculum covers various aspects, including military tactics and strategy, leadership and command, and military law and administration.
The Regular Course is tri-Service during the SMC phase. Following this phase, the Army, Navy, and Air Force Cadets complete their proper special service training at GMA. Regular Career Course training includes two weeks of jungle training at the Jungle Warfare School in Achiase, Eastern Region. The cadets also undertake a week mountaineering in Amedzofe, Volta Region.
Upon successful completion of the RCC, officer cadets are commissioned as Second Lieutenants in the Ghana Armed Forces, with a minimum service commitment of around 10-15 years.

c. Short Service Commission and Special Duty Course (SSC/SD) which is for 26 weeks.
The Short Service Commission and Special Duties Course is a six-month program for direct entry professionals and servicemen whose services are needed by the Armed Forces as specialist officers. Under the updated training regime, the course begins in February and ends in August of the same year.

d. Special Medical Intake (SMI) which is for 12 weeks
The Special Medical Intake (SMI) course is a specialized training program designed for medical professionals who wish to join the military. This training program is a compressed version of the Special Duties and Short Service Commission Course. It comprises twelve (12) weeks of normal military training designed to enhance the officer cadets' leadership abilities, physical fitness, and military demeanor, among other attributes.

These programs consists of a four-week induction "Ginger" phase . The training regime consists of classroom lessons and field exercises at Bundase, Aburi Mountains, and the Michel Camp-Zenu-katamanso-Gbatsona general areas. The cadets practice conventional warfare with additional tactical drills conducted on the plains of the Michel camp. At Achiase, the Jungle Warfare School offers an introduction to jungle operations.
Barracks tutorials in Drill, Basic Officer Training, Leadership Training, Tactics, Physical Training, Field Craft, Service Writing, Military Law, Map Reading, Voice Procedure, Organisation and Roles of the Ghana Armed Forces and Administration in Peace and War.Unlike some other national military academies such as West Point in the United States, the Royal Military College of Canada in Canada or the Nigerian Defence Academy in Nigeria, GMA is not a university. As a requirement, prospective cadets must already possess a Bachelors degree.

=== Organisation Of The Cadet Body ===
The Cadet body is organised into a Cadet Battalion which is commanded by a Commanding Officer Cadet Battalion who is responsible through the Course Commanders and the Svc Chief Instructors for training and administration of the cadet body. They are assisted by Officers Commanding, Course Officers, Platoon Commanders and Platoon Non Commissioned Officers.
The cadet body is divided into companies for administrative and training purposes. Officers Commanding, Course Officers, Platoon Commanders, Company Sergeant Majors (CSMs) and Platoon Non Commissioned Officers are assigned to each company as follows:

a. The companies are designated Abyssinia, Burma, Chiringa, and when required Duala. For the ease of instruction, field training/exercises, command and control, cadets are further organised into Platoons. Each Platoon's strength is not more than 35 cadets. The platoons are designated 1st Platoon, 2nd Platoon, 3rd Platoon, 4th Platoon in that order.
b. Irrespective of the Course or Intake, cadets are assigned to companies upon entry into the Academy. Membership of company may change from time to time due to changes in strengths, appointments, or other exigencies.

== Cadet Appointments ==
=== Ranks and Organisation ===
The Ghana Military Academy bestows appointments on outstanding senior cadets to aid in the overall leadership of the cadet body. The appointments are typically made during a change of status ceremony and include; Senior Under Officer (SUO), Junior Under Officer (JUO), Cadet Sergeant Major (CSM),Cadet Company Quartermaster Sergeant (CCQMS), Cadet Sergeant (C/Sgt),Cadet Corporal (C/Cpl). These appointees may be identified by their epaulet(tte)s. Typically, golden insignia on a red background.

Cadet Appointments

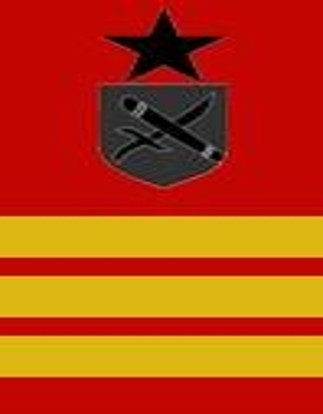
Senior Under Officer (SUO) Insignia

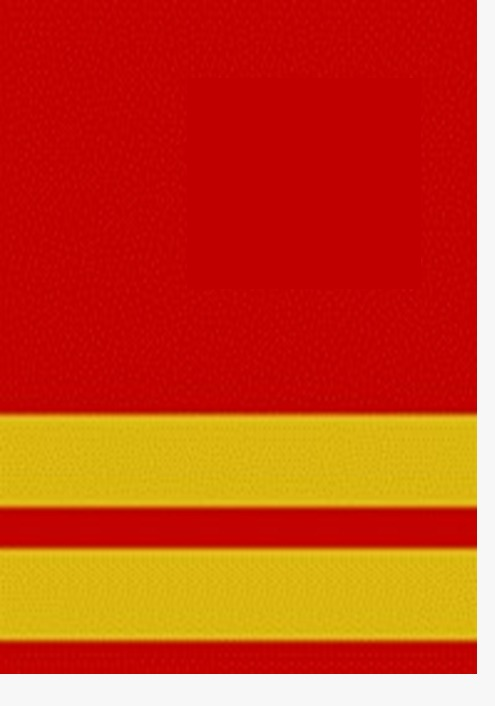
Junior Under Officer (JUO) Insignia

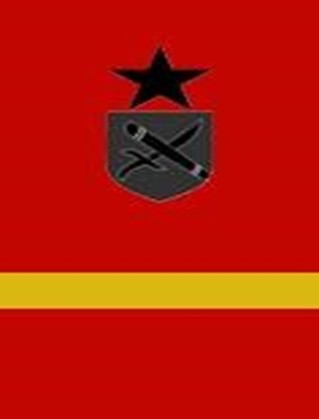
Cadet Sergeant Major (CSM) Insignia

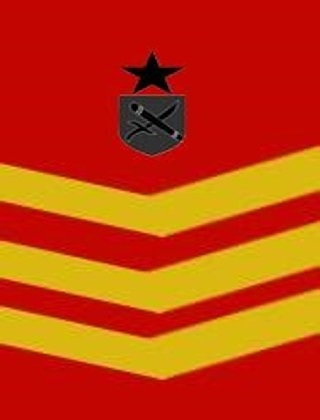
Cadet Company Quartermaster Sergeant (CCQMS) Insignia

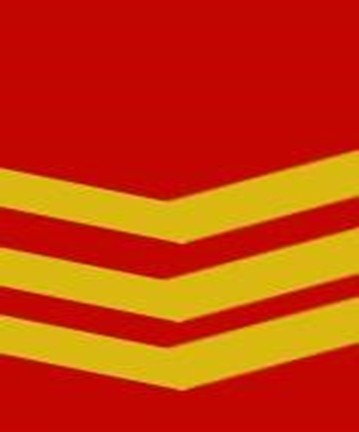
Cadet Sergeant (C/Sgt) Insignia

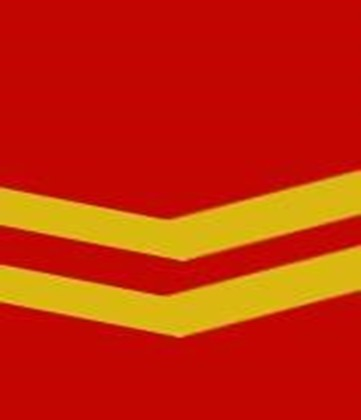
Cadet Corporal (C/Cpl) Insignia

Senior Cadet Ranks (Regular)

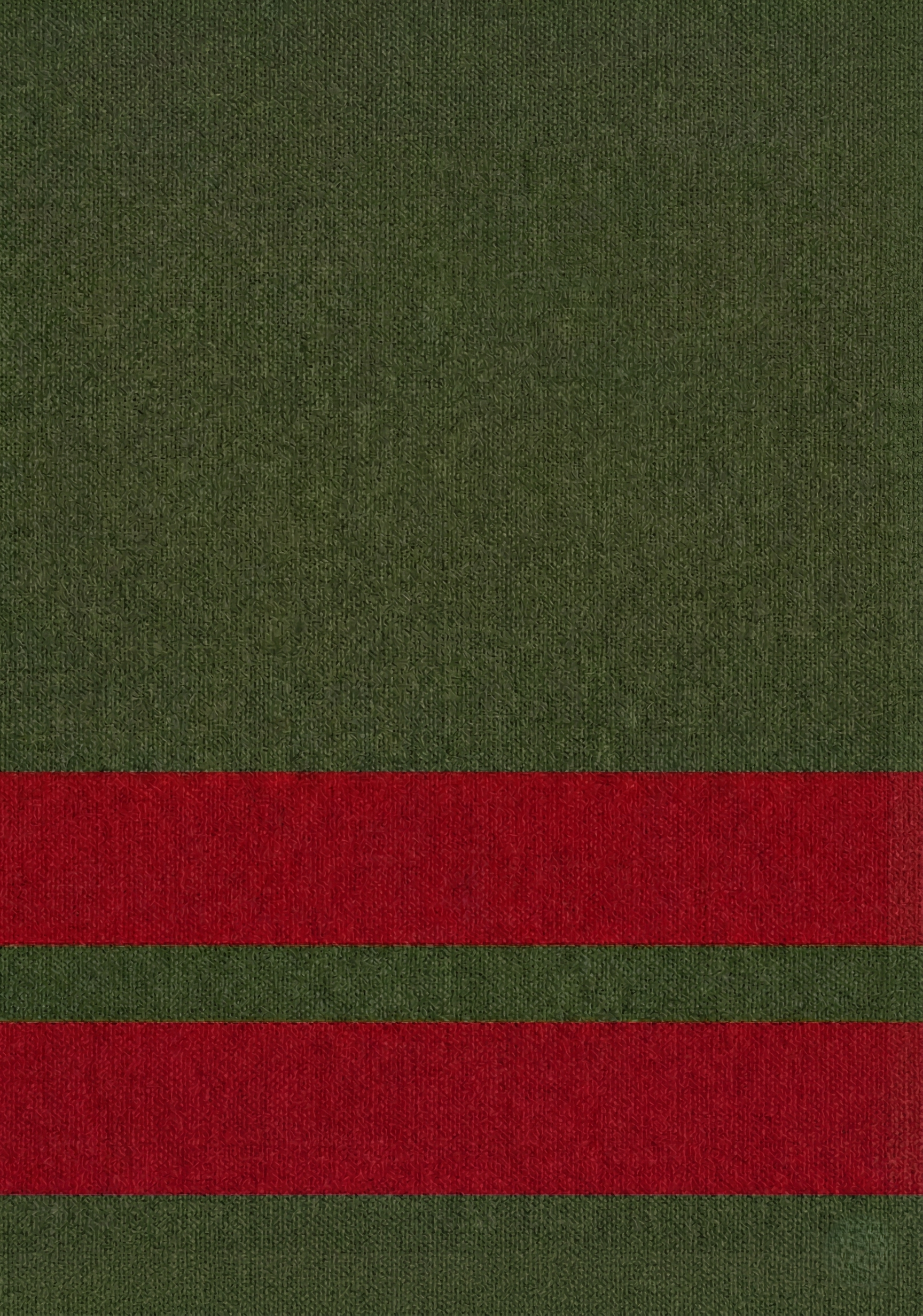
Army Senior Cadet Regular

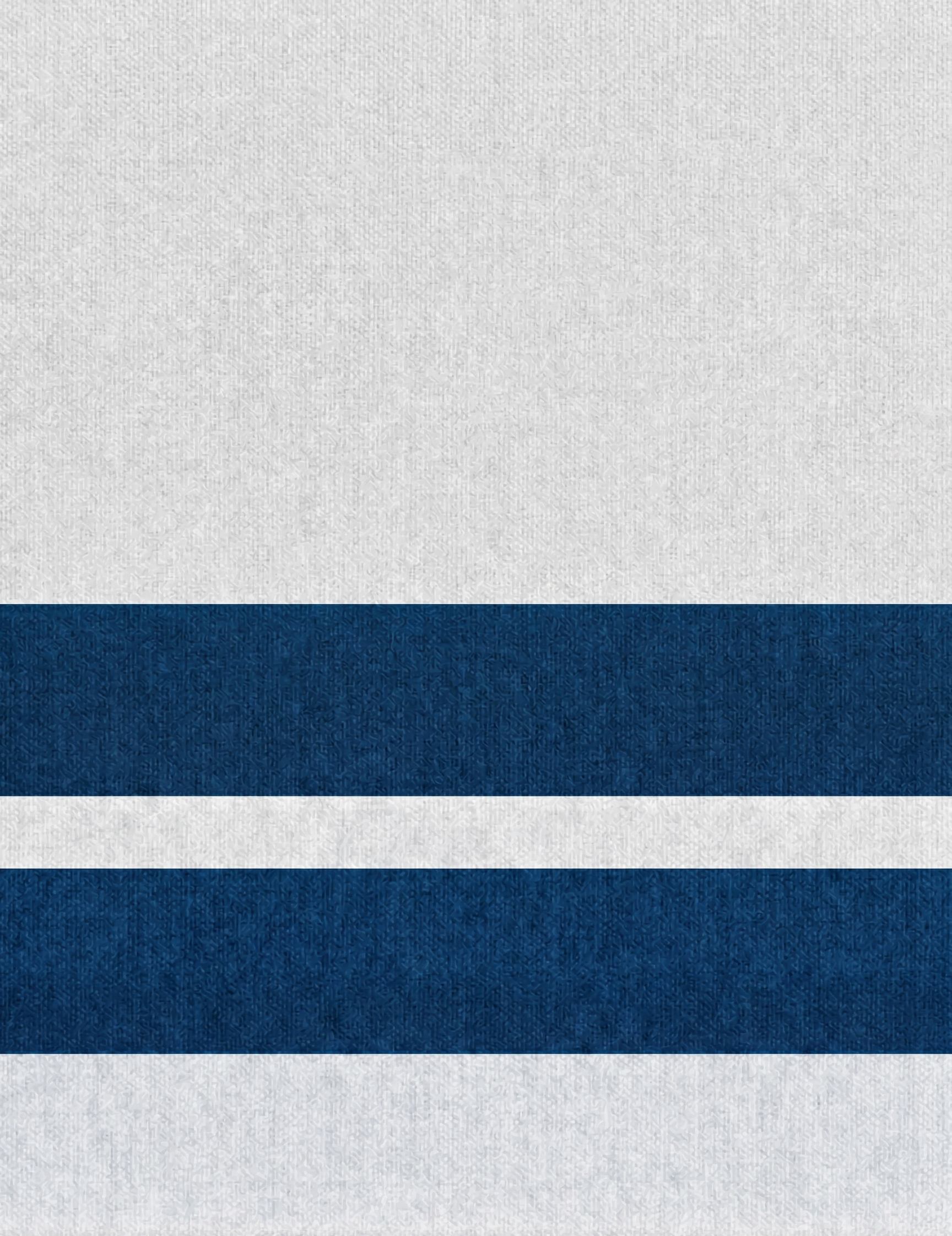
Navy Senior Cadet Regular

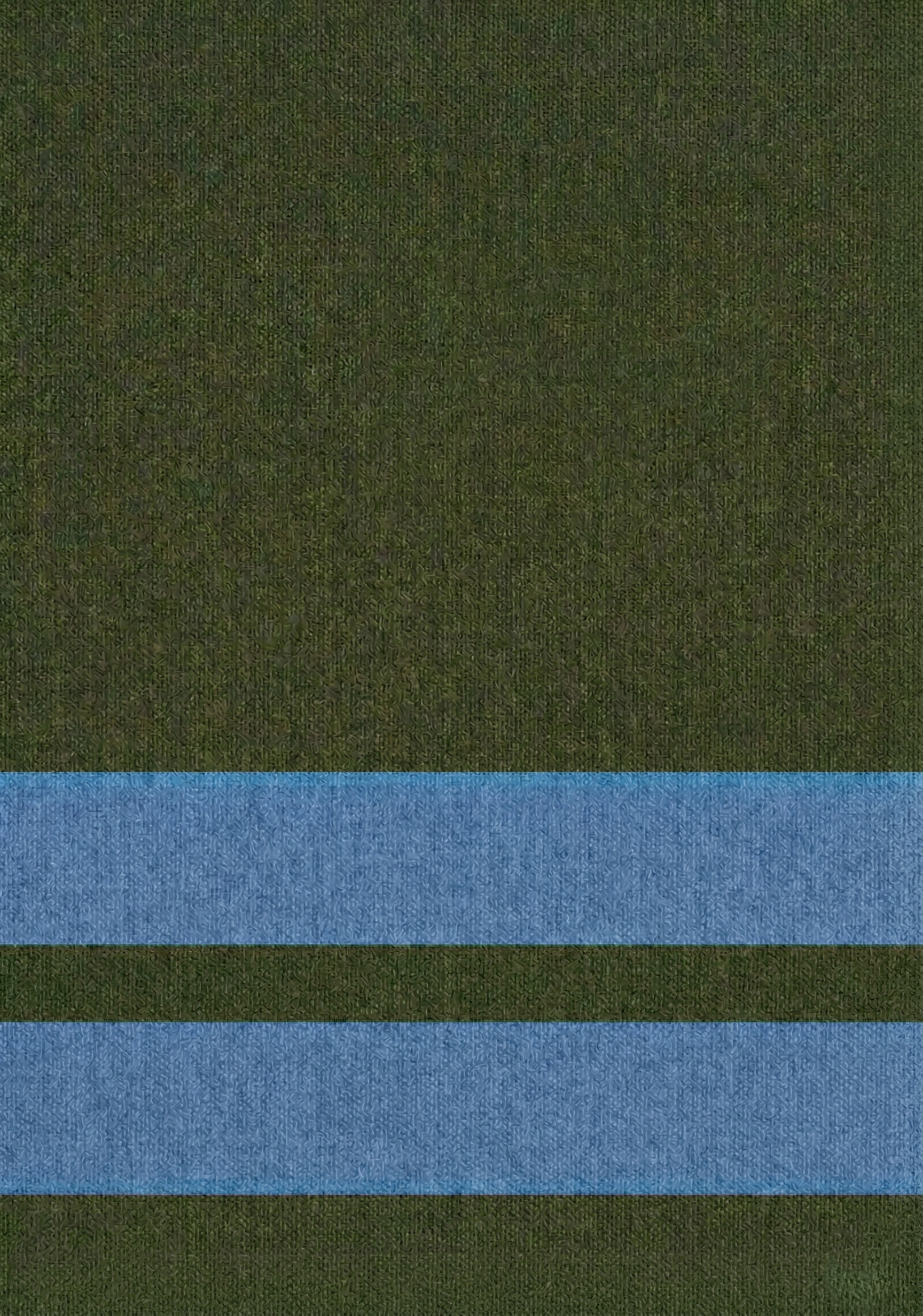
Airforce Senior Cadet Regular

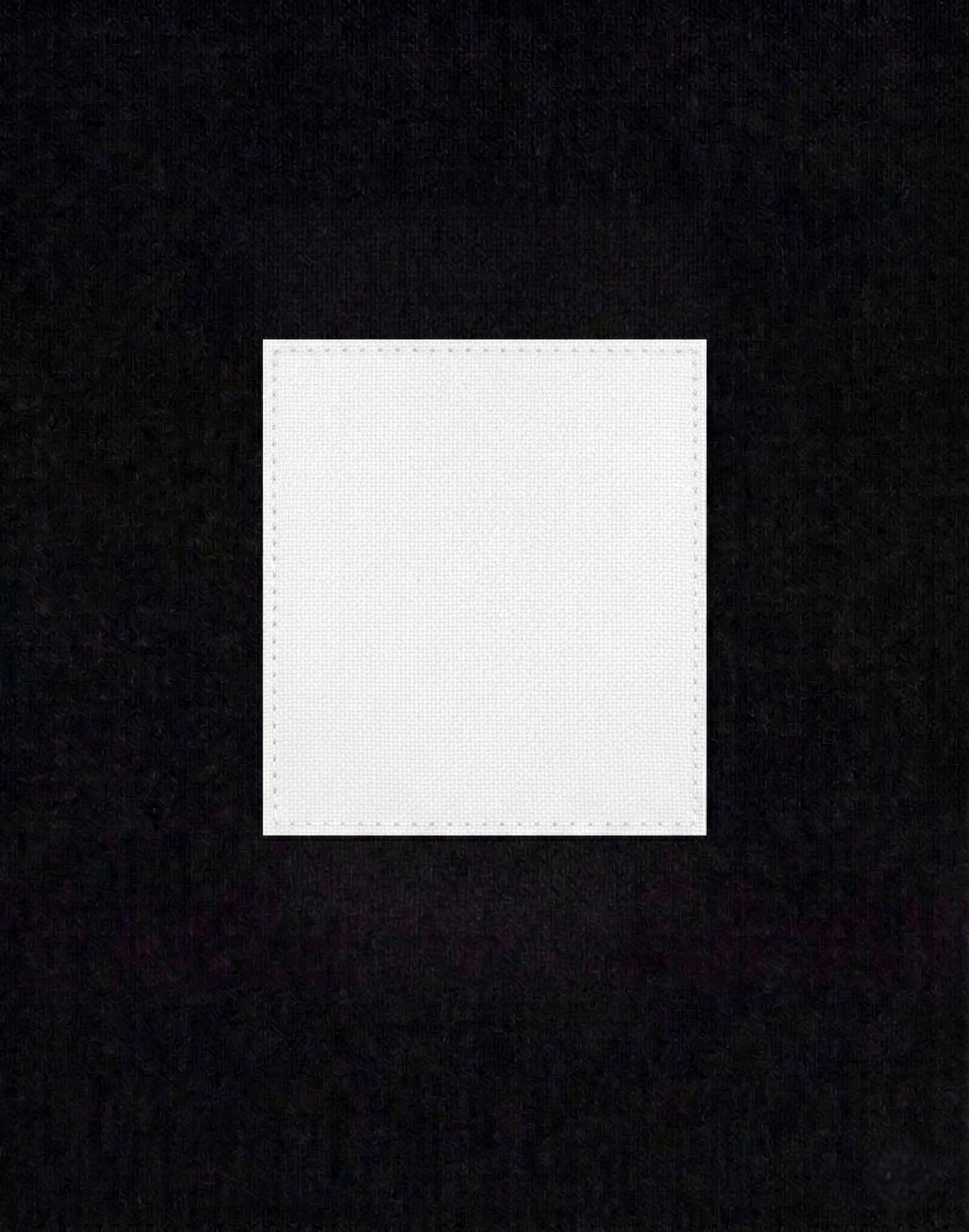
Navy Midshipman

Junior Cadet Ranks (Regular)

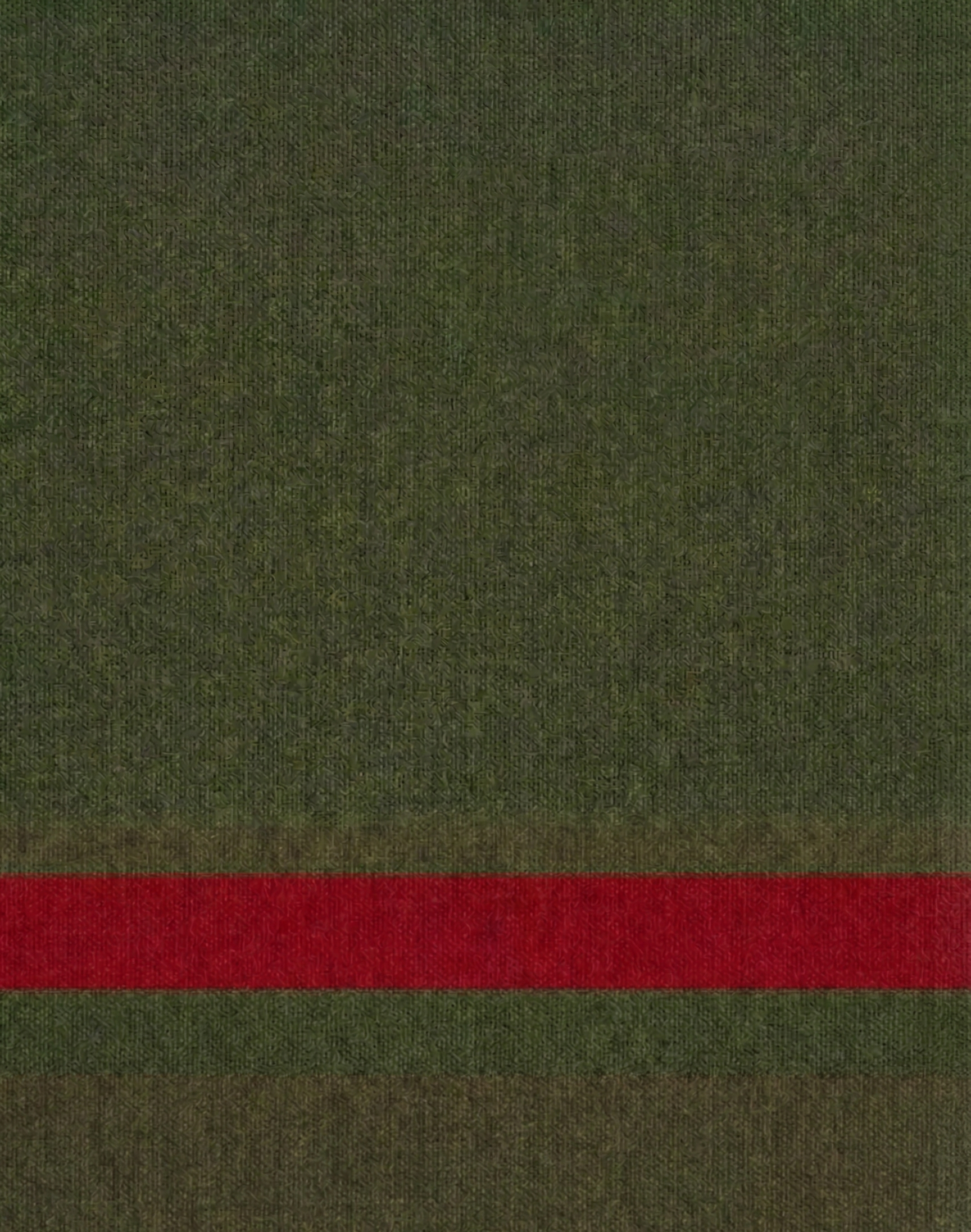
Army Junior Cadet Regular

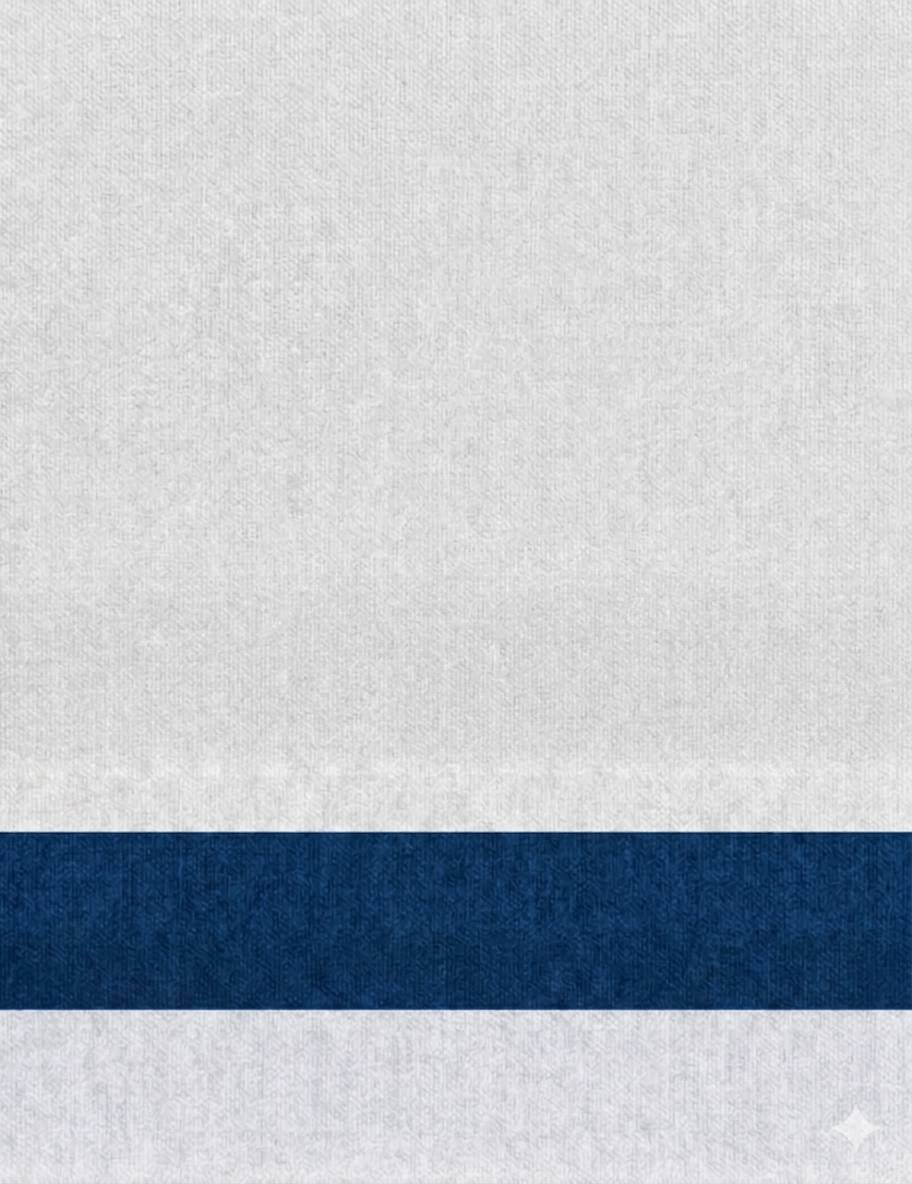
Naval Junior Cadet Regular

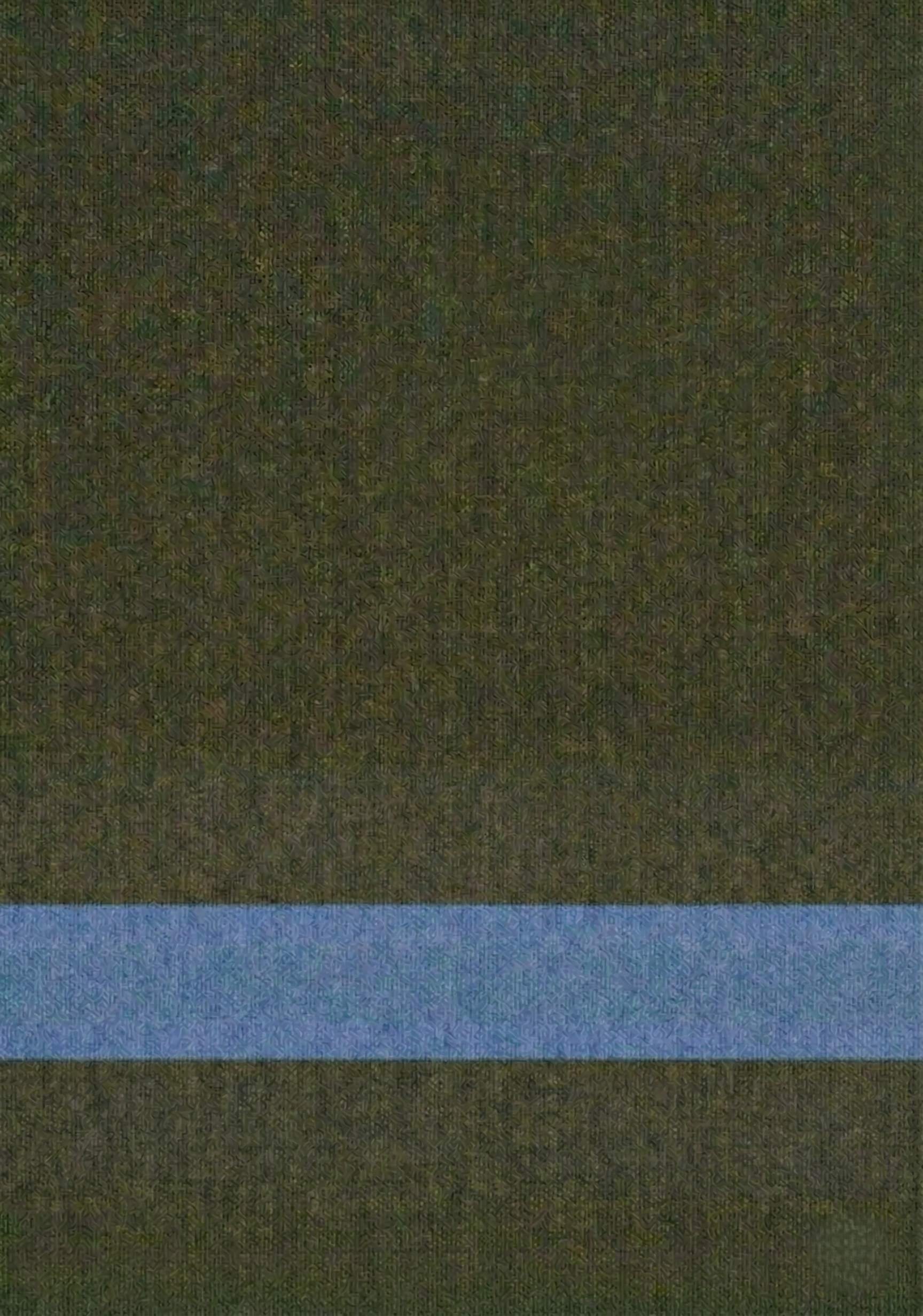
Airforce Junior Cadet Regular

Senior Cadet Ranks (Short Service)

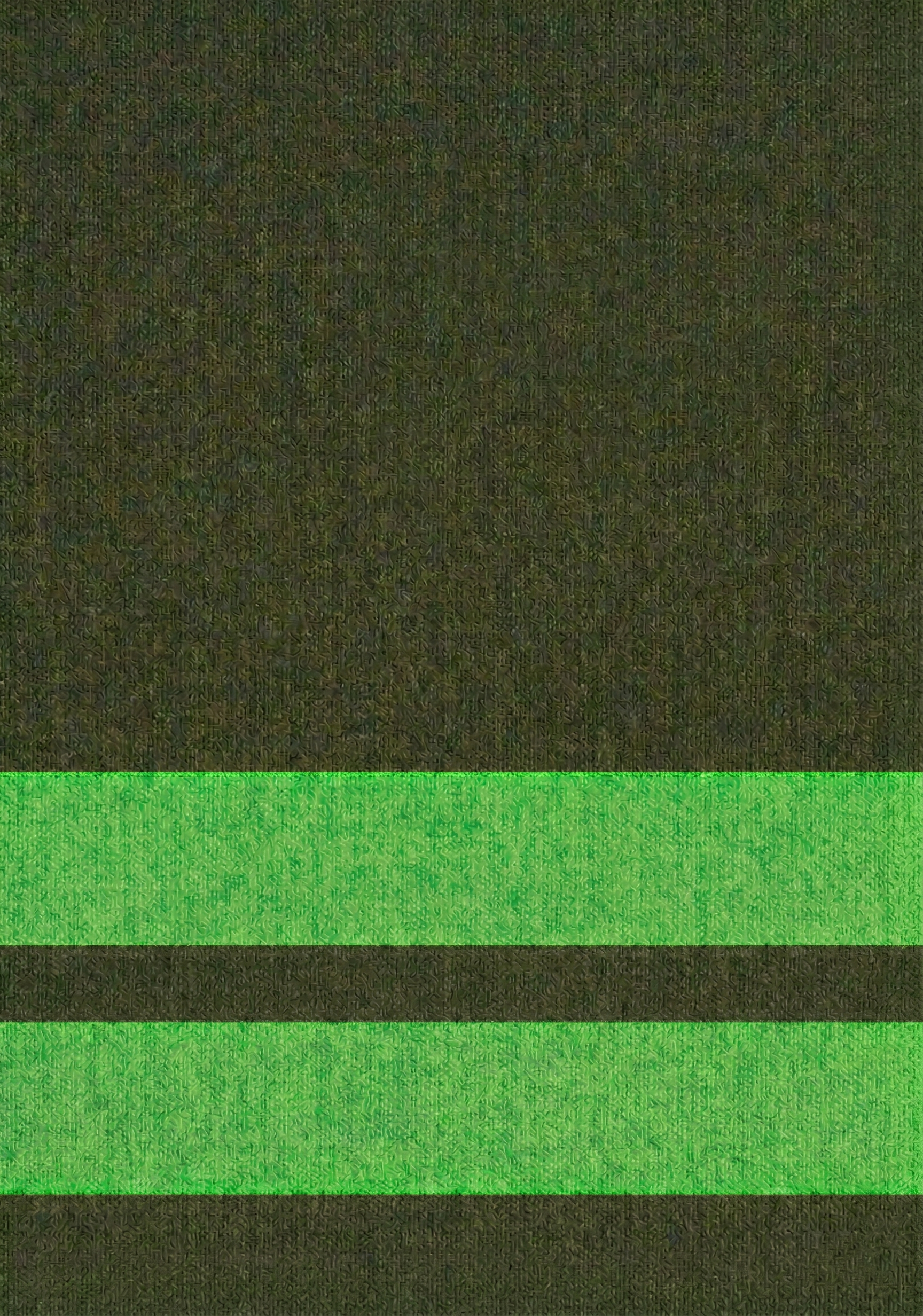
Army Senior Cadet Short Service

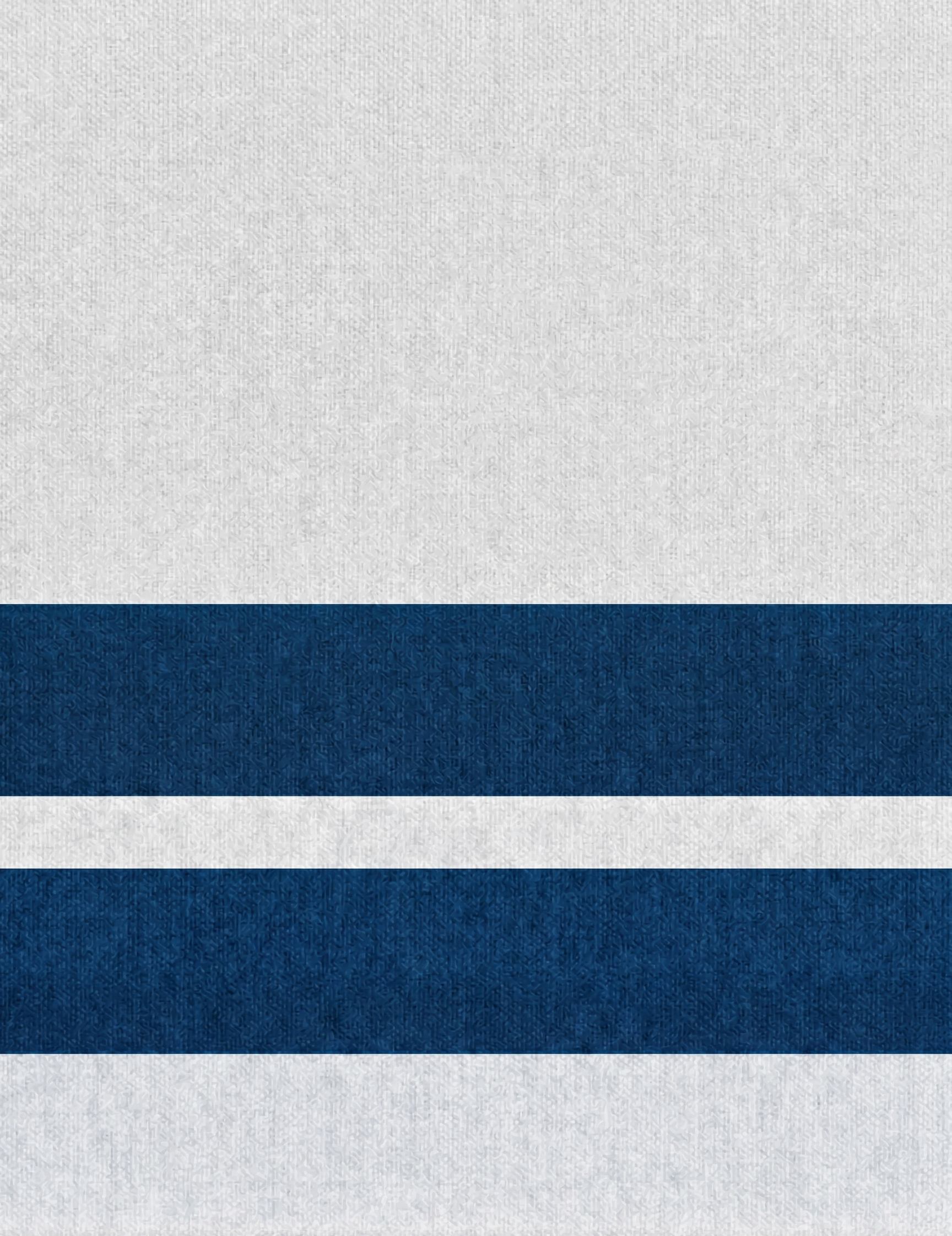
Navy Senior Cadet Short Service

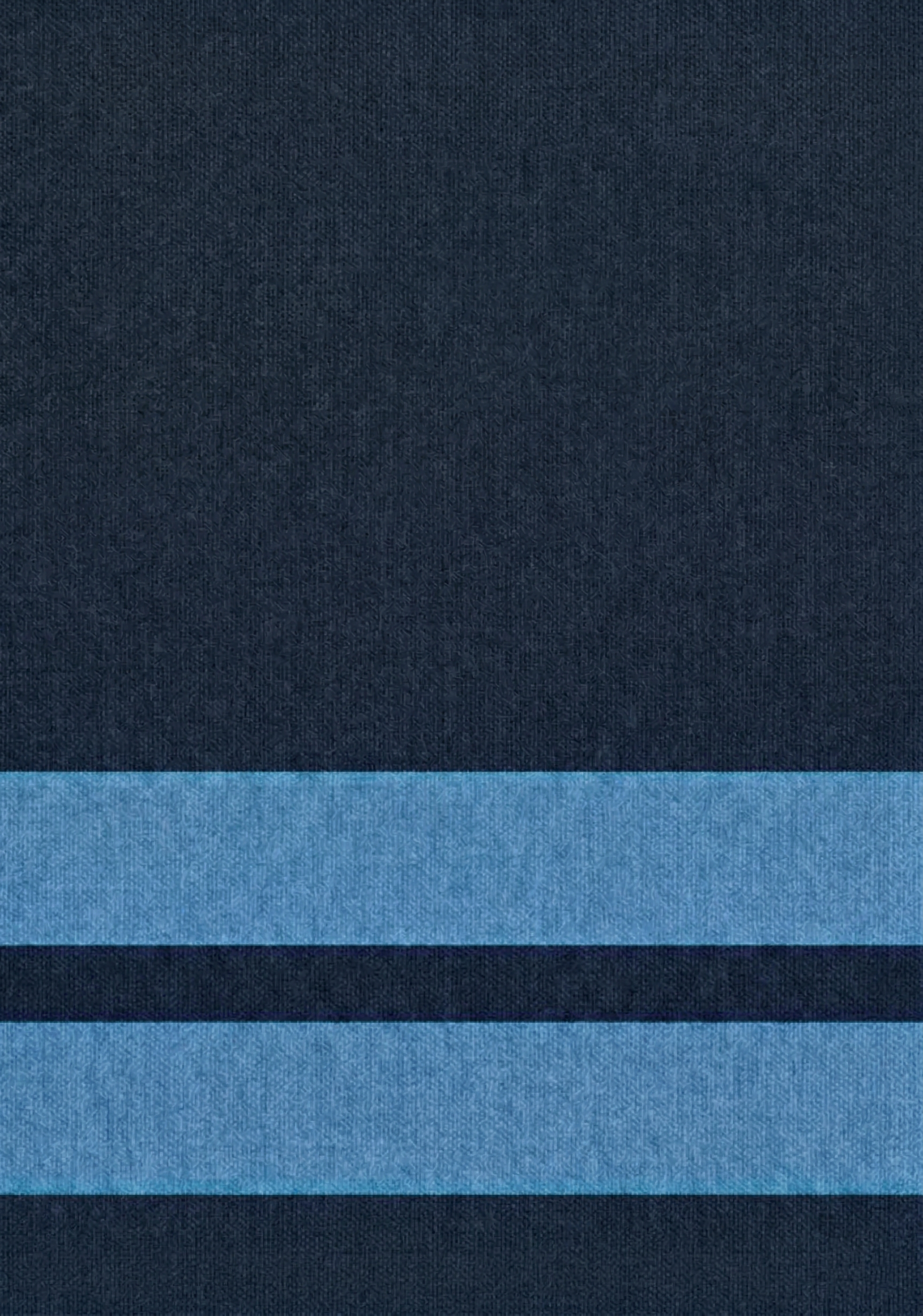
Airforce Senior Cadet Short Service

Junior Cadet Ranks (Short Service)

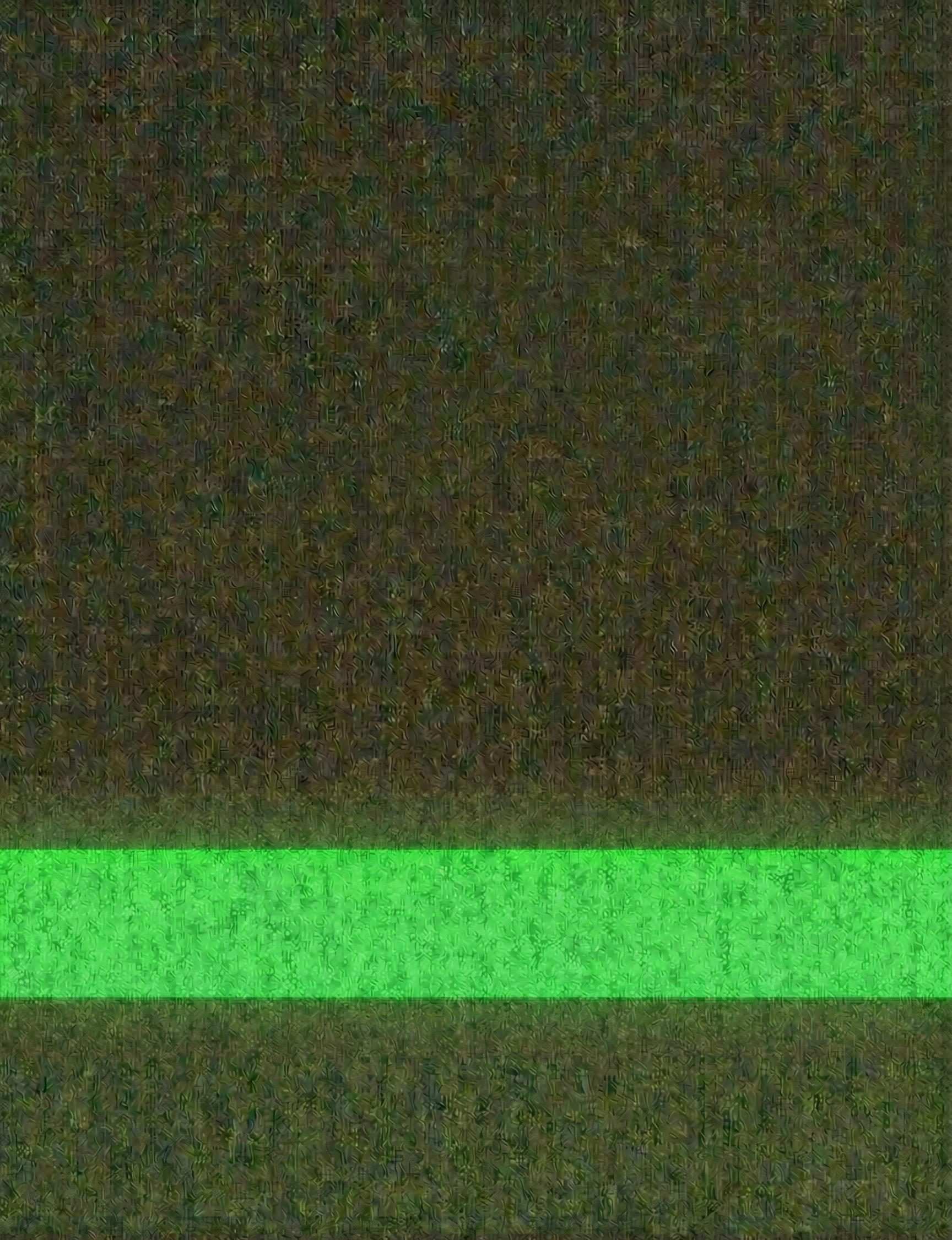
Army Junior Cadet Short Service

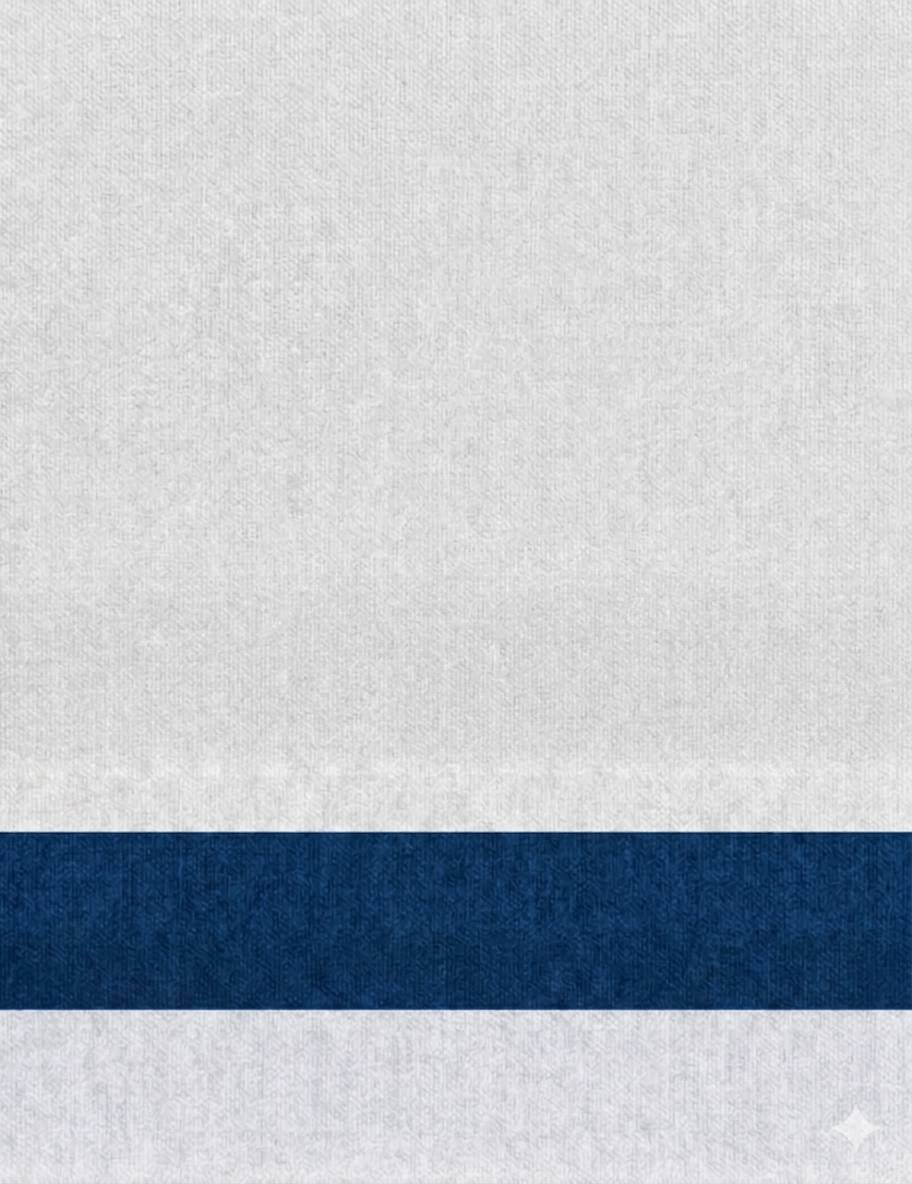
Naval Junior Cadet Short Service

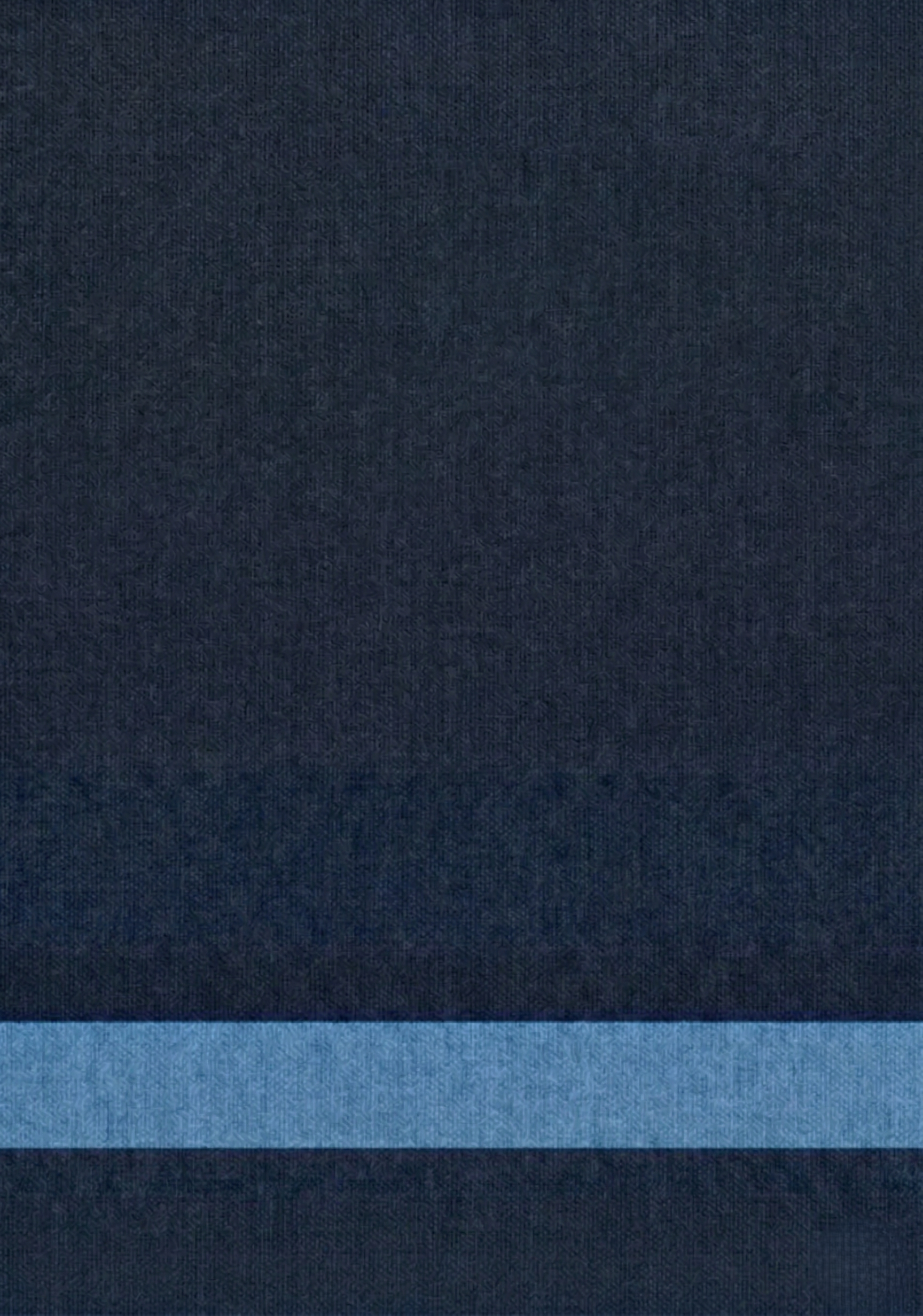
Airforce Junior Cadet Short Service

== GMA Anthem ==
Lyrics
1. Hail the Ghana Military Academy
Training grounds of the Ghana Armed Forces Command.
Service Devotion and Sacrifice.
Service to Ghana our mother land
Here to learn, obey, command and lead.
Will your anchor hold the training ground?

Safety, honour and welfare of your country first.
The comfort of the men you command next and yours last.
GMA's mission to produce leaders of character.

2. We shall not fail this course
Future of the Ghana Armed Forces Command.
We will train with all our might.
No sky too high, sea too rough and land too tough.
Here to learn to obey command and lead
Will your eyes behold the graduation scroll.

Composed by
Col Francis Kweku Ennin (Rtd)

== GMA Colours ==
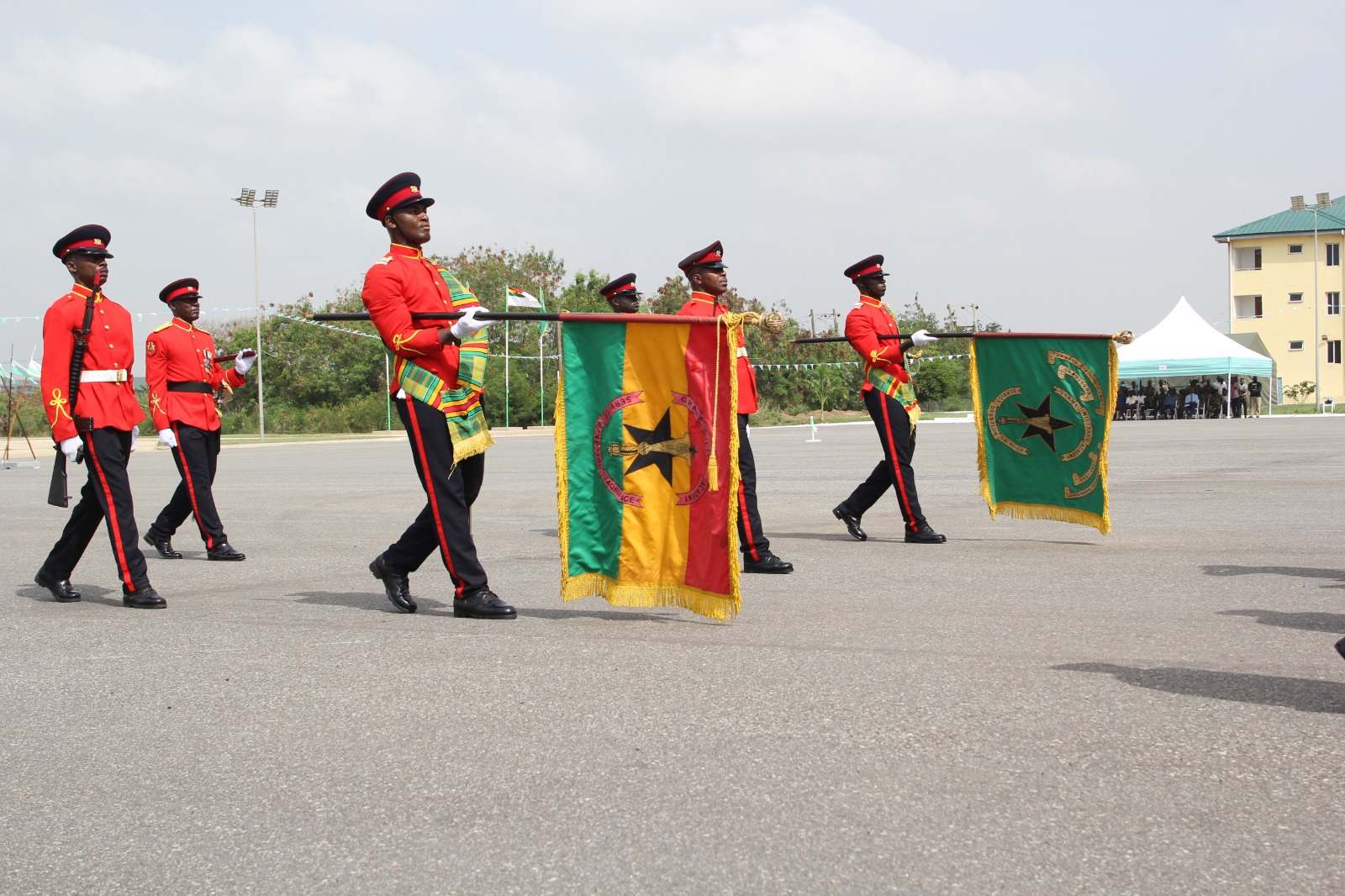
Ghana Military Academy Colours

The National and GMA Colours were presented to the Academy on 17 August 1985 on the occasion of the school's Silver Jubilee by then Commander in Chief, former President Jerry John Rawlings. The colours were received on behalf of the unit by then Cadet Sergeant Gyasensir Christopher, now Brig Gen Christopher Gyasensi (Rtd), Ghana's Former Defence Attache to South Africa, and Cadet Sergeant Major Aryee Moses, also now Brig Gen Moses Mohammed Aryee (Rtd), the immediate Past General Officer, commanding Northern command. The colours were presented during the time of Regular Career Course 25 and Short Service Course 24.

== GMA Parade square ==
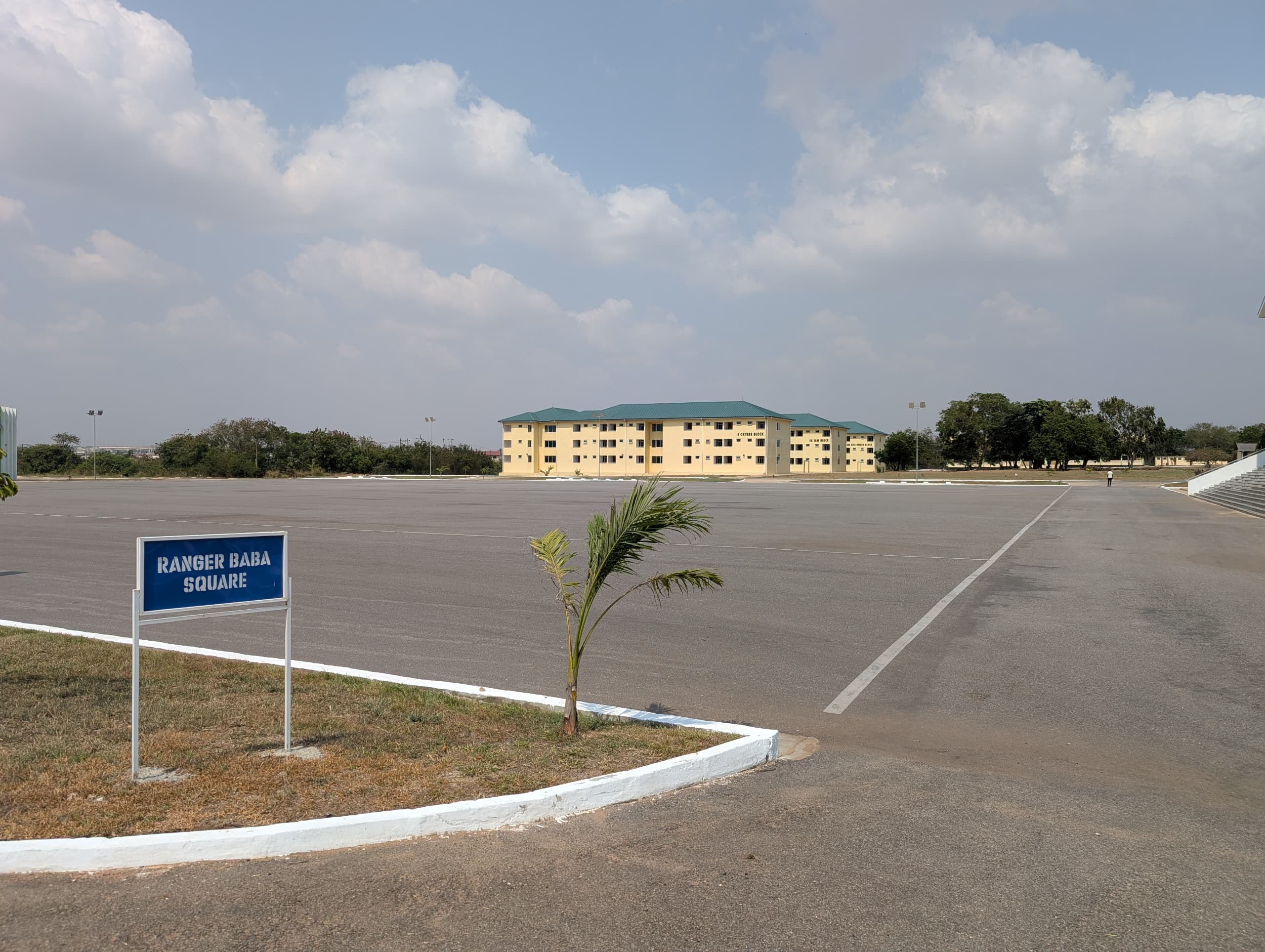
GMA Parade Square

Ranger Baba Square

The Ghana Military Academy Parade square was completed on 15 September 2020 as part of the Ghana Military Academy upgrade project. The space was formerly a decorated fountain and flag post for the forecourt of the Old Officer Cadets Mess.

== Awards ==
=== Sword Of Honour ===
The award (sword) is given to the Overall Best Cadet in a Regular intake. The candidate must demonstrate academic performance over the period and be the first in order of merit. He must demonstrate high standard of leadership, discipline, and command respect from the Cadet body. He must also possess personal drill, turnout, and military bearing, with a good fitness level.

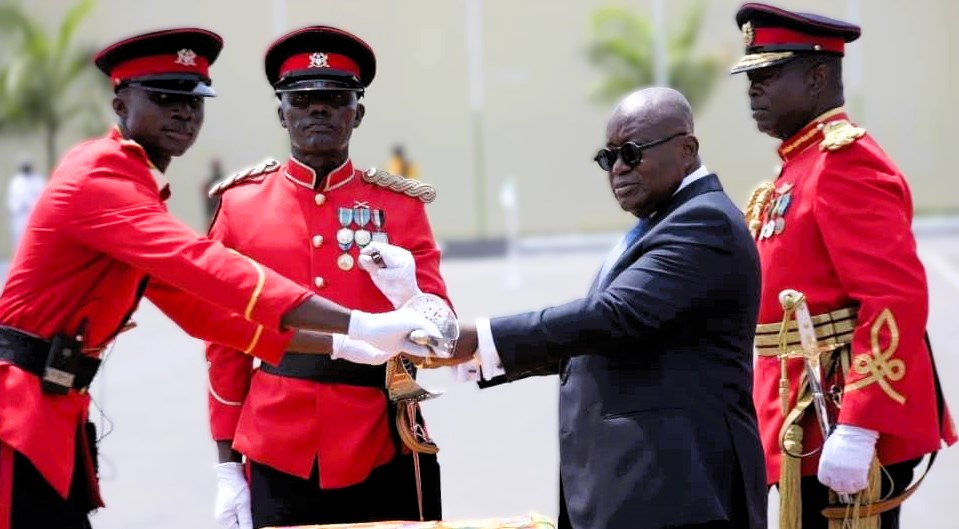
Sword Of Honour Award

The Sword of Honour is the personal sword of the late Col Emmanuel Osei Owusu of Regular Career Course I and the first Senior Under Officer (SUO) of the Academy. He was the Parade Commander of the first graduation parade held for RCC intakes 1 and 2 and was presented with the Sword of Honour for emerging as the overall best cadet during his training. He donated the sword to GMA on the occasion of the Silver Jubilee Anniversary of the Academy in 1985. The sword is used by graduation parade commanders and then returned to a vault in the ante room after the parade.

=== Chief of the Defence Staff Award ===
The award is given to the Overall Best Cadet in a Short Service Commission/Special Duty intake, based on academic achievement, leadership, discipline, respect, personal drill, turnout, and military bearing.The award must be given to only a Short Service Commission/ Special Duty graduating intake.

=== Military Cane Award ===
The Cadet, adjudged as the second overall best in an intake, is awarded the Military Cane Award. This award recognizes a Cadet's leadership, understanding, and physical fitness, as well as their outstanding turnout, military bearing, and conduct, all of which contribute to their overall academic order of merit.

=== Academic Cane Award ===
The Academic Cane Award is awarded to a Regular Cadet who ranks third in merit, demonstrating all necessary qualities for sword of honour and military cane selection, including good turnout, drill performance, physical fitness, good academic performance, leadership traits, and character during training.

=== Chief Of The Army Staff (COAS) Award ===
Chief of the Army Staff Award is given to the best Regular Army cadet during the Service Terms. During the Service Terms, he must rank first among the Army cadets in terms of merit. He must command respect from the Cadet body and exhibit a high level of discipline and leadership. He must be zealous and enthusiastic about field work and Tactical Exercise Without Troops (TEWT), that are characterized by the training. This award is given based on results pertaining to just army subjects completed by only army cadets. Only graduating cadets from Regular Career Courses are eligible for this award.

=== Sextant Award ===
The Sextant Award, also known as the Chief of the Naval Staff Award, is given to the best regular Naval Cadet. The award is based on hard work, confidence, good bearing qualities, distinction in the Fleet Board oral examination. as well as physical fitness and swimming skills. The award is given to those who excel in naval subjects and place first among Midshipmen at the end of their course. This award is only available to Regular Career Course graduating intake.

=== Eagle Award ===
The Eagle Award, also known as the Chief of Air Staff's Award, is the highest honor in the Air Faculty for the Overall Best Regular Flight Cadet during training. It is awarded to the most meaningful contributions during classroom and field exercises, and is only given to graduates of a Regular Career Course. Results from Air Force subjects are used as criteria.

=== Leadership Award ===
The Leadership Award is given to a cadet who demonstrates exceptional leadership qualities, including hard work, maturity, respect, resourcefulness, and foresight. Additionally the cadet must exhibit exceptional result-oriented behavior and have the ability to mobilise the cadet body and prepare them toward any pending exercise even when not in appointment. This award is given separately to graduates of Regular Career Course and Short Service Course/Special Duty, and is applicable to both regular and special duty graduates.

=== Best in Tactics Award ===
The Best in Tactics Award is earmarked to Regular Army Cadets who demonstrate an in-depth understanding and application of Army tactics and practical field exercises during faculty terms. He must excel in tactical lessons and exercises, perform well in faculty TEWTs.He must be observed to make salient and laudable tactical submissions during discussions. This award is given separately for Regular Career Course and short Service Course/Special Duty graduating intake

=== Best in Drill Award ===
The Best in Drill Award is given to the Cadet who excels in both written and practical drill. He must demonstrate good mutual and individual foot drill, excellent military bearing, and turnout. He/she must also place first in practical drill examinations and have a strong understanding of drill through written examinations in the course of training. This award is given separately to a Regular Career Course and Short Service Course/Special Duty

=== Best Shot Award ===
The Best Shot Award is given to the best cadet in all disciplines of Skill at Arms. It requirement includes, remarkable weapon handling and marksmanship abilities. He must be marksman during the Annual Personal Weapon Test and must have registered good performance during Individual Battle Shot. The award is given separately for Regular Career Course and Short Service Course/Special Duty.

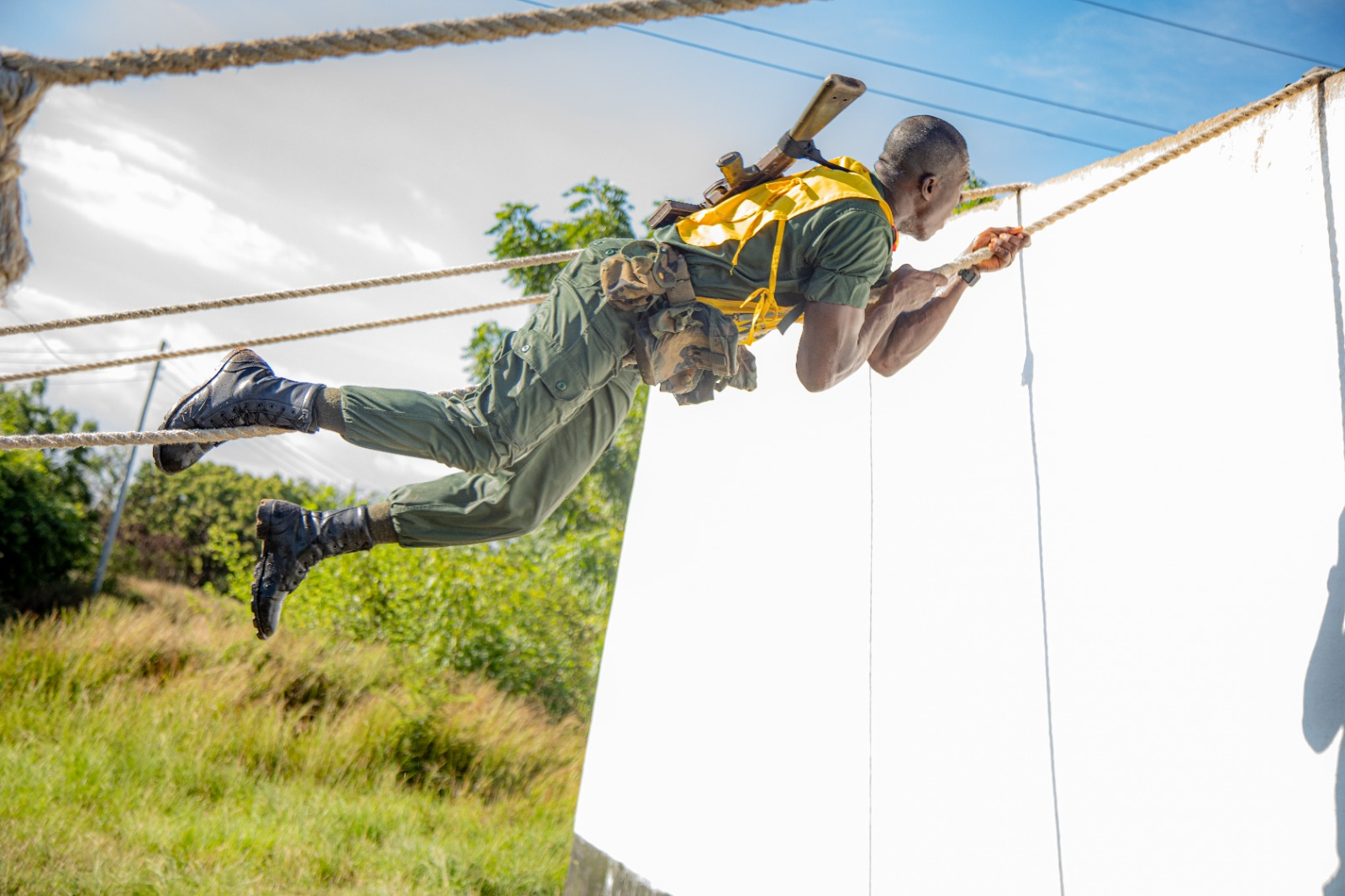
A Cadet during Physical Training

=== Best in Physical Training Award (Male) ===
The Best in Physical Training (PT) award is given to the male cadets who greatly excels in physical training, passing all tests and showing consistent improvement. They must demonstrate an appreciable understanding of physical training by completing all physical training test conducted at the military academy, that is, Junior Steeple Chase, Combat Fitness Tests, and Senior Steeple Chase Competitions. This award is given separately to Regular Career Course and Short Service Course/Special Duty.

=== Best in Physical Training Award (Female) ===
The Best in Physical Training (Female) award is given to a female cadet who has excelled greatly in Physical Training, passing all her physical training tests and showing consistent improvement. She must also demonstrate an appreciable understanding of Physical Training by successfully completing all physical training test conducted in the military academy tests, that is, Junior Steeple chase, Combat Fitness Tests and Senior Steeple Chase Competitions. This award is given separately to Regular Career Course and Short Service Course/Special Duty.

=== Commandant’s Company Award ===
The Commandant's Company Award is given to the Overall Best Company that emerges first in Inter Company Competitions during training. The competitions assessed include Junior Steeplechase, Senior Steeplechase, Boxing, Military Skills Competition, Team Battle Shoot and any other competition determined by the commandant. Companies will be assessed on teamwork, endurance, tact, and ability to accomplish tasks/missions within a given period. This award can be given to Regular Career Courses and Short Service Commission/Special Duty Courses.
