= Ghana Navy =

Naval warfare branch of Ghanaian armed forces

- Emblem of the Ghana Navy
- Founded: 29 July 1959 (66 years, 9 months)
- Country: Ghana
- Type: Navy
- Role: Naval warfare
- Part of: Ghana Armed Forces
- GN HQ: Accra, Greater Accra, Ghana
- Colors: Ultramarine, Iceberg and Blue-Gray
- Engagements: First Liberian Civil War
- Website: Official website

Commanders
- Chief of the Naval Staff: Rear Admiral Godwin Livinus Bessing

Insignia
- Naval Ensign 1957−1964 1966−present

- Naval Ensign 1964−1966

The Ghana Navy (GN) is the naval warfare organizational military branch of the Ghanaian Armed Forces (GAF). The Ghanaian Navy, along with the Ghanaian Army (GA) and Ghanaian Air Force (GHF), make up the Ghanaian Armed Forces (GAF) which are controlled by the Ghanaian Ministry of Defence (MoD).

== History ==
The nucleus of the Ghana Navy is the Gold Coast Naval Volunteer Force formed during World War II. It was established by the colonial British administration to conduct seaward patrols to ensure that the coastal waters of the colony were free from mines. Following Ghana's attainment of independent nationhood on 6 March 1957 from the UK, the country's military was reorganized and expanded to meet its new challenges. A new volunteer force was raised in June, 1959 with headquarters at Takoradi in the Western Region of Ghana. The men were drawn from the existing Gold Coast Regiment of Infantry. They were under the command of British Royal Navy officers on secondment. On 29 July 1959, the Ghana Navy was established by an Act of Parliament. The force had two divisions based at Takoradi and Accra respectively. On 1 May 1962, the British Navy formed the Royal Navy Element of the British Joint Services Training Team, thus changing the nature of its relationship with the Ghana Navy. The first Chief of the Naval Staff was Captain D. A. Foreman, a retired British Naval Officer. He was granted a Presidential Commission as a Ghana naval officer in the rank of commodore. In September 1961 Nkrumah terminated the employment of British officers in the armed forces: the first Ghanaian to become Chief of the Naval Staff was Rear Admiral David Animle Hansen, who was transferred from the Ghana army to head the navy. On September 14 1990, the GNS Achimota was hit by NPFL artillery while on a fact-finding mission near Monrovia. As a result, 2 Ghanaian sailors and 3 Nigerian nurses were killed, and the Ghanaian Air Force retaliated with airstrikes.

== Organization ==
The Ghana Navy command structure consists of the Naval Headquarters at Burma Camp, Accra. There are three operational commands, the Western Naval Command at Sekondi, the Eastern Naval Command at Tema and The Naval Training Command at Nutekpor-Sogakope in the Volta Region.

=== Western Naval Command ===
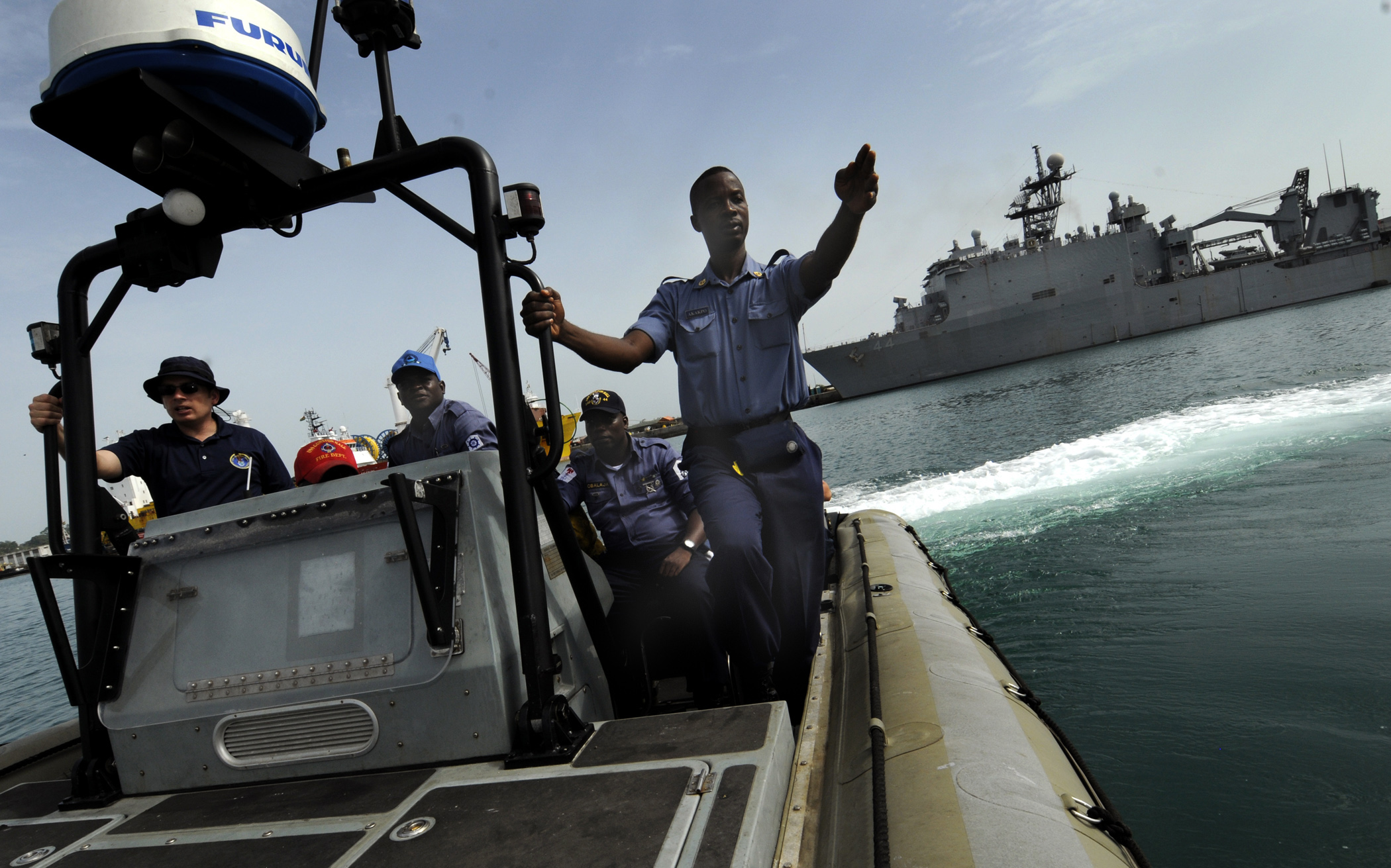
Ghana Navy sailor a in rigid-hulled inflatable boat

The command comprises the following elements:

- HQ Western Naval Command
- Ghana Navy Fleet
- The Naval Dockyard Complex
- Ghana Navy Stores Depot
- Naval Base, Sekondi – West Command
- The Naval Trade Training School

=== Eastern Naval Command ===
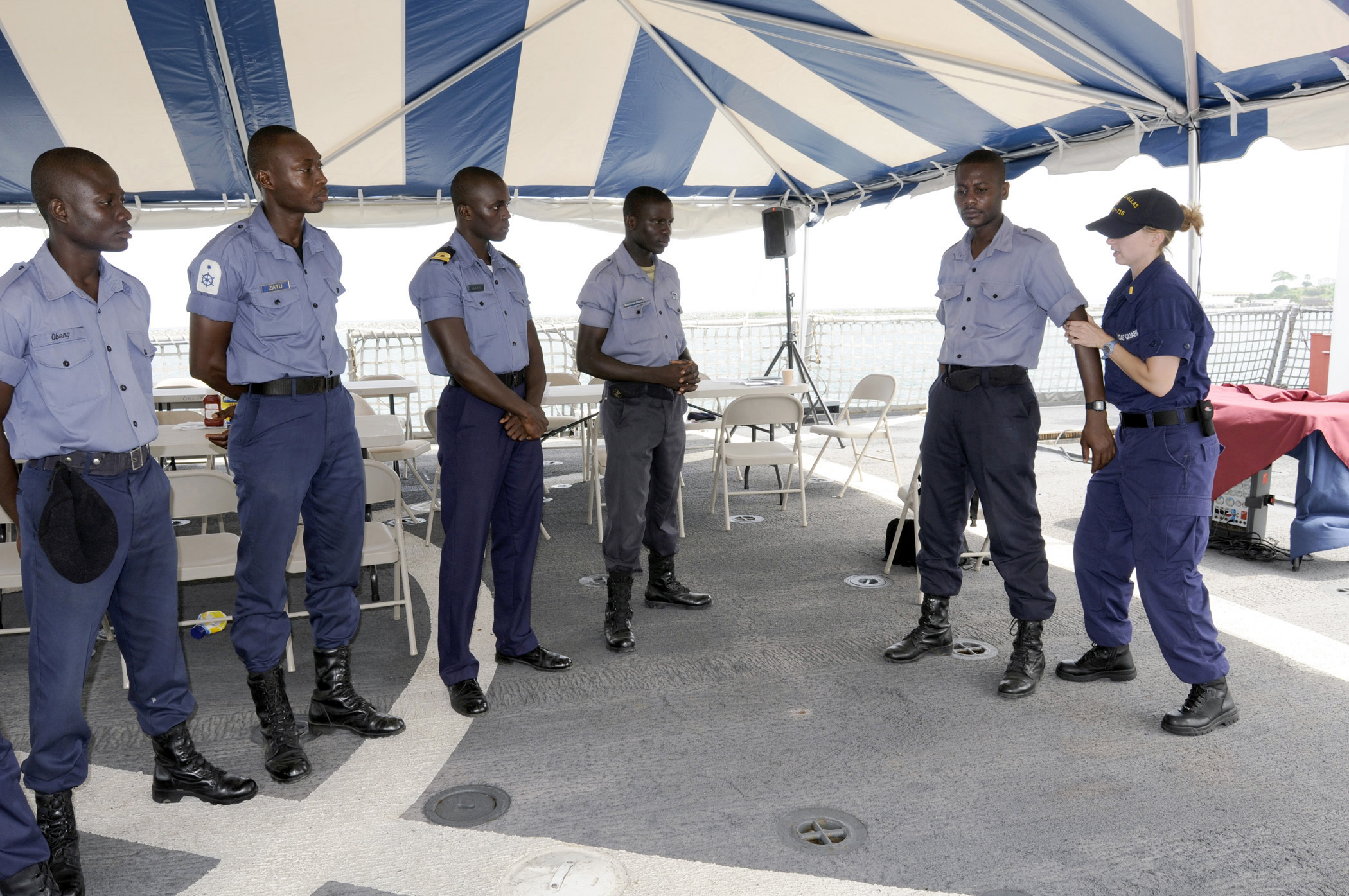
Members of the Ghanaian Navy learning maritime law-enforcement tactics

The command comprises the following elements:

- HQ Eastern Naval Command
- Basic and Leadership Training School
- Naval Base, Tema
- Ghana Navy Band, Tema

=== Departments ===
The navy is organized into the following departments.

- Operations
- Administration
- Training
- Logistics (Supply)
- Technical
- Intelligence and
- Research and Development

== Roles ==
The Ghana Navy fulfills a broad range of roles. These include:

- The monitoring, control and surveillance of fishing activities
- Maritime Presence in the West African Waters and Naval Support in the Region and Crises Areas when requested
- Surveillance, Effective Patrol and Control of Ghana's Territorial Waters and Economic Zone
- Evacuation operations of Ghanaian and other nationals from troubled spots
- Fighting and checking criminal activities such as piracy/armed robbery at sea, smuggling of illicit drugs, stowaways and dissident activities
- Disaster and humanitarian relief operations, search and rescue, and other mercy missions at sea
- Assisting civil authorities such as the Ghana Police, the Volta River Authority, the Electoral Commission, Ghana Ports and Harbours Authority

== Equipment ==
=== Current active naval vessels ===
==== Snake-class patrol vessels ====
46.8m patrol vessels ordered from China's Poly Technologies subsidiary of China Poly Group Corporation in 2011 and delivered to GN (Ghana Navy) in October 2011. The boats were commissioned 21 February 2012.

Name	Pennant	Builder	Launched	Commissioned	Status
GNS Blika	P34	Qingdao Qianjin Shipyard, China	1 April 2011?	21 Feb 2012	Active
GNS Garinga	P35	Qingdao Qianjin Shipyard, China	1 April 2011?	21 Feb 2012	Active
GNS Chemle	P36	Qingdao Qianjin Shipyard, China	1 April 2011?	21 Feb 2012	Active
GNS Ehwor	P37	Qingdao Qianjin Shipyard, China	1 April 2011?	21 Feb 2012	Active

==== Balsam-class patrol ships ====
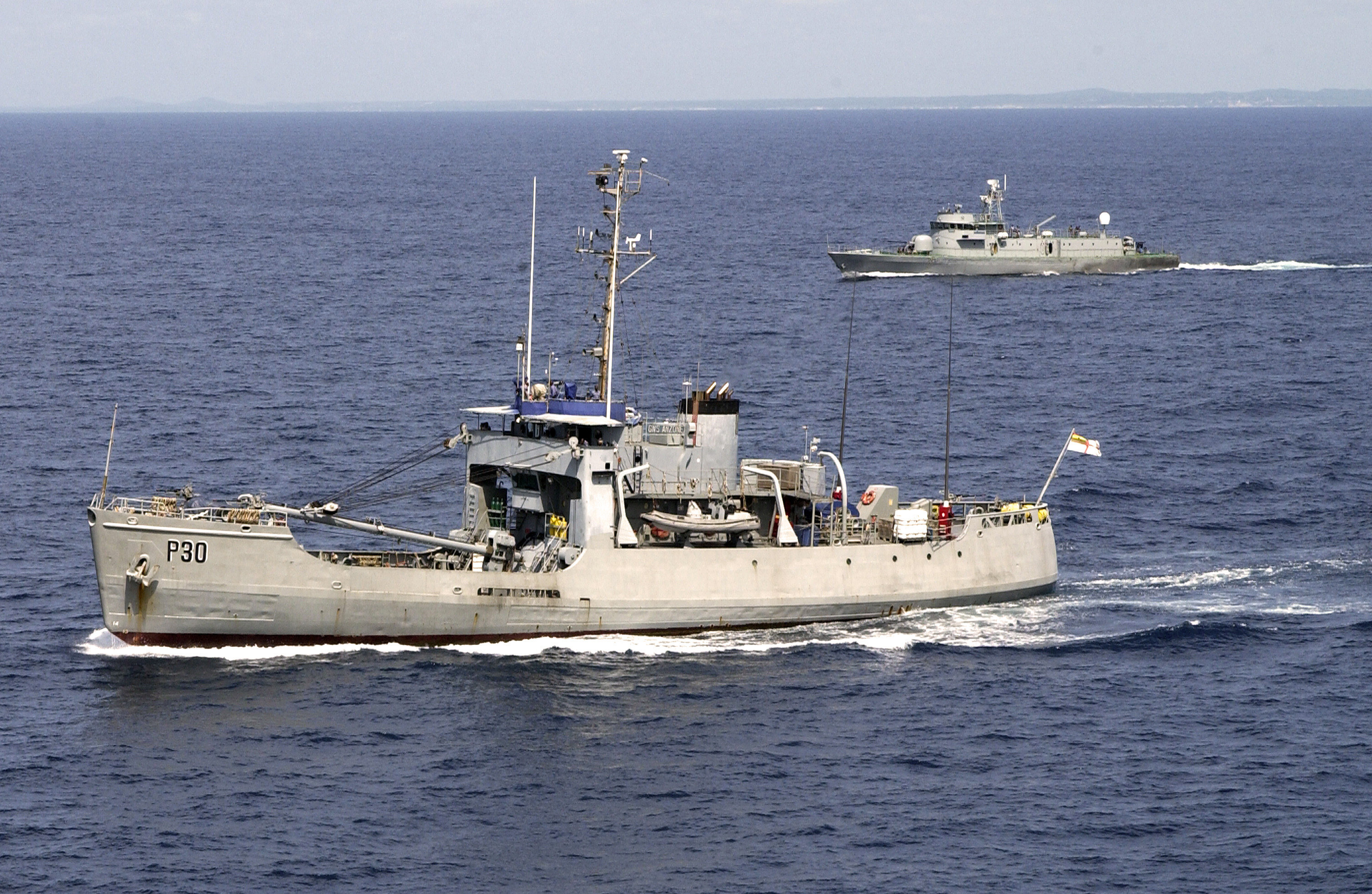
The patrol ship GNS Anzone (P30) with GNS Achimota (P28) in the Gulf of Guinea in October 2005.

U. S. Coast Guard vessels. After serving the USCG for 57 years, Woodrush was decommissioned on March 2, 2001, and sold to GN (Ghana Navy) to serve as GNS Anzone P30.

Name	Pennant	Builder	Launched	Commissioned	Transferred	Status	ex
GNS Anzone (~shark)	P30	Marine Iron & Ship Builders	28 April 1944	22 September 1944	2001	Active	USCGC Woodrush (WLB-407)
GNS Bonsu (~whale)	P31	Marine Iron & Ship Builders	31 December 1943	26 July 1944	2001	Active	USCGC Sweetbrier (WLB-405)

==== Chamsuri-class patrol boat ====
Republic of Korea Navy vessels. Chamsuri means 'Sea Dolphin'.

Name	Pennant	Builder	Launched	Commissioned	Transferred	Status	ex
GNS Stephen Otu	P33	Korea Tacoma, Hyundai Heavy Industries, Hanjin Heavy Industries		July 1980	21 January 2011	Active	PKM 237

==== Albatros-class fast attack craft ====
German navy. Purchased in 2005 at $36 million for the two ships.

Name	Pennant	Builder	Launched	Commissioned	Transferred	Status	ex
GNS Sebo (~leopard)	P27	Fr Lurssen Werft GmbH & Co	19 September 1979	2 May 1980	2010	Active	
GNS Dzata (~lion)	P31	Fr Lurssen Werft GmbH & Co	19 September 1979	4 December 1979	2010	Active	

==== Warrior-class/Gepard-class fast attack craft ====
German navy S74 Nerz and S77 Dachs. Purchased at $37 million for the two ships.

Name	Class	Type	Pennant	Builder	Launched	Commissioned	Transferred	Status	ex
GNS Yaa Asantewaa	Gepard-class	Fast attack craft		Fr Lurssen Werft GmbH & Co		14 July 1983	31 July 2012	Active	
GNS Naa Gbewaa	Gepard-class	Fast attack craft		Fr Lurssen Werft GmbH & Co		22 March 1984	31 July 2012	Active	

==== River Class ====
Name	Pennant	Type	Builder	Launched	Commissioned	Transferred	Status
GNS Pra		offshore patrol vessel	Penguin Ship Yard		22 February 2022		Active
GNS Densu		offshore patrol vessel	Penguin Ship Yard		22 February 2022		Active
GNS Volta		offshore patrol vessel	Penguin Ship Yard		22 February 2022		Active
GNS Ankobra		offshore patrol vessel	Penguin Ship Yard		22 February 2022		Active

==== USCG Defender-class boat ====
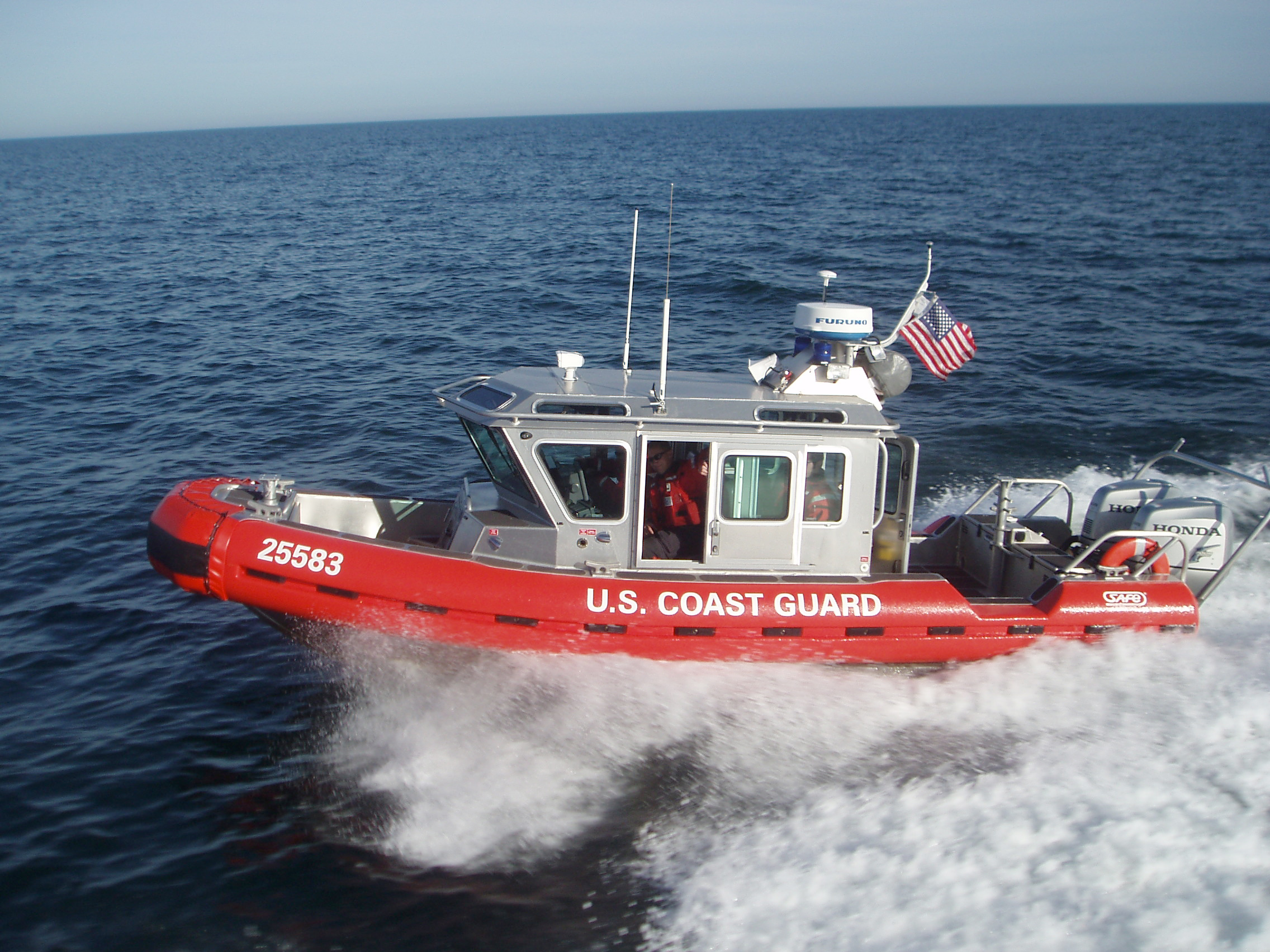
USCG Defender-class boat

U. S. Coast Guard. In 2008, the Ghana Navy acquired three such boats from the US Navy. They were handed over to the GN Western Naval Command in Sekondi-Takoradi. On 13 March 2010, presented four additional boats.

==== Others ====
- GNS Achimota (P28) – Flagship of the Ghana Navy. German built FPB 57-class patrol ship (Launched: 14 March 1979, commissioned: 27 March 1981)
- GNS Yogaga (P29) – German-built FPB 57-class patrol ship (1979)
- GNS David Hansen – Named after David Animle Hansen, first Ghanaian Chief of Staff of the Ghana Navy. A single 20 m-long ex-US Navy PB Mk III inshore patrol craft that was built in the 1970s and transferred to Ghana in 2001.
- NAVDOCK 1 – Ghana's first indigenous landing craft.
- On 10 December 2010, the Ghana Navy received six new speedboats with complete accessories from Ghana Red Cross to facilitate its rescue mission in the country. The accessories included six Yamaha outboard motors, life jackets, life lines, first aid equipment and maintenance tools.
- GNS Achimota (2024) - Largest ship in the Ghana Navy. Built by Kurinoura Shipbuilding in Yawatahama, Ehime Prefecture, Japan (Commissioned 23 December 2024)

=== Past naval vessels ===
The initial fleet of the navy consisted of two Ham-class minesweepers, GNS Yogaga and GNS Afadzato. They were recommissioned on 31 October 1959. They were joined by four T43-class minesweepers from the Soviet Union between 1961 and 1964, three Komar-class missile boats between 1967 and 1970 and one more in 1980, and two Yurka-class minesweepers in 1981–82. In 1965, a frigate was ordered by the government of President Nkrumah, intended to also serve as the presidential yacht. The warship was laid down by Yarrow Shipbuilders in Scotland under the name Black Star, but when Nkrumah was deposed in a coup in the following year, the project was cancelled. The ship was eventually bought by the Royal Navy, commissioned as HMS MERMAID, and then sold to Malaysia as the KD Hang Tuah.

== Future plans ==
The Ghanaian Defence Minister, Lieutenant General J. H. Smith, announced in June 2010 that over 10 ships would be acquired as part of a short-term plan to re-equip the navy, and defend Ghana's exclusive economic zone.

== Rank structure ==
=== Officers ===
The GN officers in descending order of seniority:

Rank group	General / flag officers				Senior officers			Junior officers
Ghana Navy
Ghana Navy	Admiral	Vice admiral	Rear admiral	Commodore	Captain	Commander	Lieutenant commander	Lieutenant	Sub lieutenant

=== Ratings ===
The GN ratings in descending order of seniority:

Rank group	Senior NCOs			Junior NCOs	Enlisted
Ghana Navy					No insignia	No insignia
Ghana Navy	Chief petty officer	Petty officer first class	Petty officer second class	Leading seaman	Able seaman	Ordinary seaman
