= Joe Baidoo-Ansah =

Ghanaian politician

Hon. Joe Baidoe-Ansah

Member of the Ghana Parliament for Kwesimintsim Constituency
- In office 7 January 2012 – 6 January 2017
- Preceded by: Joseph E.K. Abekah
- Succeeded by: Constituency split

Member of the Ghana Parliament for Effia/Kwesimintsim Constituency
- In office 7 January 2001 – 6 January 2012
- Preceded by: Constituency split
- Succeeded by: Joseph Mensah

Personal details
- Born: 28 January 1964 (age 62) Ghana
- Party: New Patriotic Party

Joe Baidoo-Ansah is a journalist, communications specialist, human rights advocate and activist, and a politician who served as a member of parliament in Ghana from 2001 to 2017. A Member of the New Patriotic party from the Western Region and Central Region, he served as a Deputy Minister of Tourism and Diaspora Relations, Minister of Aviation, Minister for Trade Industry, private sector Development and the President's special Initiatives in the administration of President J. A Kufour. He was a member of Parliament and represented the Effia/Kwesimintsim constituency from 2001 until the constituency was split into the Effia constituency and the Kwesimintsim constituency in 2013. From 2013 to 2017, he represented the Kwesimintsim constituency in parliament.

In Parliament he served as the Chairman of the Committee on Youth, Sports and Culture, Chairman of the Communications Committee, Member of the Appointments Committee, Member of the Foreign Affairs committee, Deputy Ranking member of Committee responsible for Members holding office for Profit and Later Ranking Member for Committee on Government Assurances.

Before entering politics, Joe Baidoe-Ansah worked as Professional Journalist and was awarded the best Investigative Journalist in 1994 by the Ghana Journalist Association. He was a Communications Consultant and later became the executive director of the Ghana Committee on Human and Peoples Rights, an organization formed by him and other Convenors on 28 October 1991 in Accra. The others were Nana Akufo-Addo (Chairman), Mrs Veronica Ayikwei-Kwofie (Vice-chairperson), Joe Ghartey (Secretary), Ms. Yvette Dzeble (Treasurer), Mrs. Sylvia Cudjoe (Member), Kwesi Adu-Amankwah (Member) and Peter Blay- Arthiabah.

As a human Rights and Democracy activist, he also worked with the pro- democracy movement in Ghana and across Africa at the dangerous periods of dictatorships in the 80s and 90s, when people were killed and maimed for such activities. He was an organizer for the Movement for Freedom and Justice (MFJ) and worked together with Prof. Adu Buahen, Johnny Hanson, Akoto Ampaw, Kwasi Pratt, John Ndebugre, Sekou Nkrumah and others to end the Rawlings dictatorship. He served as a member of the Board for the Network for the Defense of Independent Media in Africa ( NDIMA) Kenya, Member of the outreach committee of the International Freedom of Expression Clearinghouse (IFEX), Toronto Canada, Member of the Continuation Committee of the All-Africa Human Rights Defenders conference, Johannesburg, among others.

He served as the Vice Chairman of the board of directors for The International Center for Not- for Profit Laws (ICNL) Washington DC (1999 to 2004) and later as an Advisory Council Member.

== Early life and education ==
Baidoe-Ansah was born on 28 January 1964. He hails from Asakae a town in the Western Region of Ghana. He obtained his master's degree in Human Rights from the University of London in 1997. He also has a master's of Arts in Conflict, Peace and Security from the Kofi Annan International Peacekeeping Center.

== Career ==
Baidoe-Ansah is a journalist by profession, a Human rights activist and specialist, and a communication, conflict and peace expert. He was the news editor for The Independent newspaper and later a freelance Journalist contributing to various news outlets. Prior to entering politics, he was the executive director of the Ghana Committee on Human and Peoples Rights (GCHPR).

== Politics ==
Baidoe-Ansah entered the parliament of Ghana as a Member of Parliament on 7 January 2001 representing the Effia/Kwesimintsim constituency on the ticket of the New Patriotic Party. He represented the constituency until 2013 when the constituency was split. He represented the Kwesimintsim constituency from 2013 to 2017.

While in parliament Baidoe-Ansah served on various committees, some of which include; the Appointment Committee, the Foreign Affairs Committee, the Chairman of the Youth and Sports Committee, Ranking Member of the Committee on Government Assurances and the Chairman of the Communications Committee. He became the Deputy Minister of Tourism and Diaspora Relation, Minister of Aviation, and Minister of Trade, Industry, Private Sector Development and President's Special Initiatives in President Kufour's government.

He was urged and tipped by many to contest for the position for the General Secretary of NPP.

=== 2000 Elections ===
Baidoe-Ansah was elected as the member of parliament for the Effia-Kwesimintsim constituency of the Western Region of Ghana in the 2000 Ghanaian general elections. He won on the ticket of the New Patriotic Party. His constituency was a part of the 9 parliamentary seats won by the New Patriotic Party in that election for the Western Region He was elected with 30,869 votes total valid votes cast. This is equivalent to 60.60% of total valid votes cast. He was elected over James Mike Abban of the National Democratic Congress, Joseph Evans Kwesi Abekah of the Convention Peoples Party, Andrew Ben Ackah of the Peoples National Convention and Fiifi Quainoo of the National Reform Party. These obtained 10,000, 8,021, 1,460 and 599 votes respectively of the total votes cast. These are equivalent to 19.60%, 15.70%, 2.90% and 1.20% respectively of total valid votes.

== Personal life ==
Baidoe-Ansah was married to the late Theresa Baidoe-Ansah, who passed on to eternity on 25 December 2019 together they had three children. He identifies as a Christian and a Catholic.
