= Ivan Beatz =

Ghanaian DJ and record producer

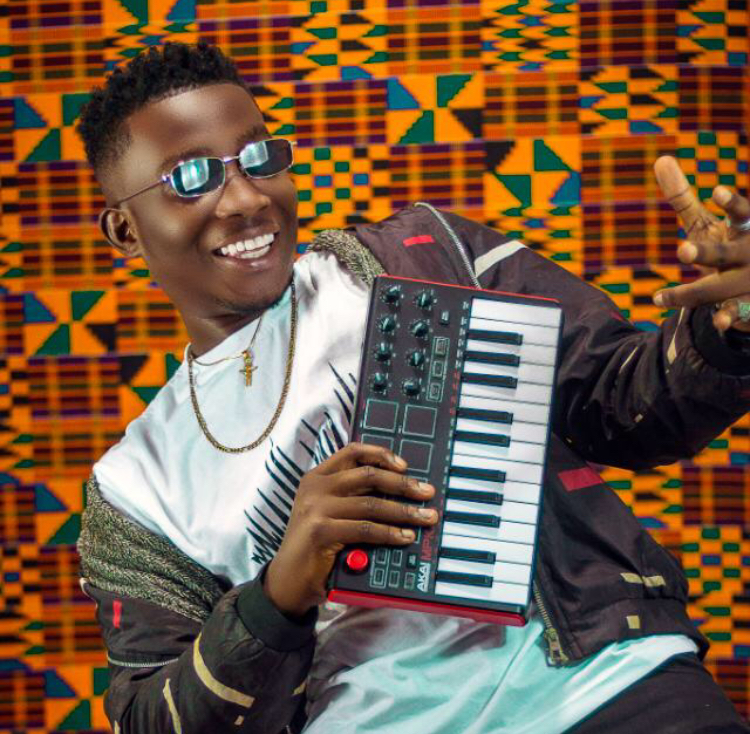

Background information
- Born: Accra
- Genres: Afro-pop, R&B, Hip hop, Afrobeat, Highlife, Hiplife, Rock Music, Fuji music
- Occupations: sound engineer, record producer and DJ
- Years active: 2014-Present
- Label: TYT Records

Ivan Beatz is a Ghanaian record producer, DJ, and composer from the Central part of Ghana. Afro-pop, Hip hop, Afrobeats, R&B, Rock, Hiplife, Fuji, and Highlife are some of his specialties.

Ivan has produced songs for a diverse range of artists, including Kwame Eugene, Bisa Kdei, Medikal, Amerado, Flowking Stone, Kwaw Kese, Sista Afia, Kelvyn Boy, Strongman, Fameye, MzVee, LAX, Feli nuna, Deon Boakye, Ayesem, Eye Judah, Opanka, Kurl Songz, Kingskid, Ras Kuku, French kiss DJ, and Eazzy.

In 2021, he was nominated for the Global Music Awards Africa in the "Producer of the Year" together with Mr Jassiq (South Africa), KillBeatz (Ghana), Scarfboy (Nigeria), MOG Beatz (Ghana), Dave Da Music Box (Ghana), Spon Key (Ghana) and Vinny Kay (Ghana).

== Early life and career ==
He started deejaying when he was a youngster and had some success. His interest in music began when he was a child, and his excitement has grown since then. He taught himself to play the keyboard, drums, and mastered Fruity Loops and other music production software applications at an early age. In 2014, he began professional music production and rose to prominence after creating "Cassanova" by French kiss DJ, which featured MzVee from Ghana and LAX from Nigeria. Ivan founded TYT Records in 2018 of which in an interview, disclosed that, TYT Records was founded with the goal of supporting up-and-coming performers and Ghanaian music.

He has worked on Hip-hop, High-Life, Dancehall, Afro-pop, Rock, and other genres. In an interview with "Modern day Ghana", he shared that, HighLife and Afro-pop have always piqued his interest. With these passions, he is more focused on enhancing the traditional Ghanaian sound that is increasingly bringing the country across borders. He produced Sista Afia's song "corner corner" featuring Kelvin Bwoy, which was nominated for the 2019 Vodafone Ghana Music Awards in the "Hi-Life Song Of The Year" category.

== Discography ==
- Sista Afia ft. Kelvin boy – corner corner
- Sista Afia ft. Kwame Eugene – Asuoden
- Bisa Kdei ft. Medikal – Netwerk
- Bisa Kdei - Are you Okay
- Ayesem ft. kurl songx – Relation plane.
- Amerado – Don't call me king
- Koby simple ft. Medikal – Dede.
- Opanka ft. Ras kuku – Chop Bet.
- Lyzzy Bae ft. Fameye – Slave wife.
- Abrewa Nana ft. Ayesem – Jah dey everywhere.
- . Boggy wenzday ft Eshun – Full stop.
- Show Boy – Kafuii.
- Frenchkiss Dj Ft Mzvee x L.A.X – Cassanova.
- Frenchkiss Dj Ft Felinuna – LIAP
- Showboy – Last Chance
- Sista Afia Ft Kelvyn Boy – Money man

== Awards and nominations ==
Year	Award	Category	Result	Ref
2021	Global Music Awards Africa	Nominated		
