= Corp Sayvee =

Ghanaian hiplife recording artist

- Also known as: Sayvee, Godogala man
- Born: Saviour Kwaku Adzika; 25 April 1984 (age 42); Takoradi, Ghana
- Origin: Anyako, Volta Region
- Genres: Hiplife
- Occupations: Singer, rapper, CEO, Facilities and Project Manager
- Instrument: Vocals
- Years active: (2003–present)
- Label: CorpNation
- Website: corpnationfoundation.org

Saviour Kwaku Adzika (born 25 April 1984), popularly known as Corp Sayvee, is a Ghanaian hiplife recording artist from Takoradi. He is well known for his single "Fantefo Na Brofoa".

== Early life ==
Corp Sayvee, the fourth of six children, was born and raised in Takoradi to parents Mr. and Mrs. Adzika. He first attended Naval Base Basic in Takoradi where he completed his Junior Secondary School level. He then gained admission into Ghana Secondary Technical School (GSTS). He is an alumnus of University of Ghana and Kwame Nkrumah University of Science and Technology.

== Music career ==
Sayvee became active in Ghana's music industry in 2003. He was signed to Hammer's music group, The Last Two in 2005.

In 2008, he launched his maiden album titled "Time to Love" in Takoradi. Corp Sayvee has worked with Ghanaian artists including Sarkodie, Jupitar, Castro, Kwabena Kwabena, Keche, Quata, Atsu Koliko, Nero X among others.

== Business career ==
Sayvee is the founder and CEO of the CorpNation Foundation, a non-profit which supports young entrepreneurs and researchers. Its activities has included the "Corp Tour", visits to secondary schools in order to educate students about topics such as savings, investments and work-life balance, and hosting events to promote peace.

In 2021, Sayvee was appointed by the Takoradi Technical University to serve on the advisory committee of the Communication And Media Section Programmes.

== Discography ==
=== Studio albums ===
Time to love (2008)

=== Singles ===
Year	Title	Album	Ref
2020	I Am The Only Me (ft. Mau At)	Single	
2020	Quarantine Love (ft. Nate A-Eshun)	Single	
2020	Komfo Pa (ft. Yaa Pono)	Single	
2018	Yolo (ft. Sarkodie, Ayesem & Nate A-Eshun)	Single	
2018	Fantefo na brofo (Remix) (ft. Patapaa, Ayesem)	Single	
2017	Love Forever (ft. Ahkan)	Single	
2017	See Me Rise (ft. Jupitar)	Single	
2016	Life (ft. Sarkodie)	Single	
2016	Obolo Lady (ft. Nero X)	Single	
2015	Body (ft. Ahkan)	Single	
2015	Toma Wondzi (ft. Singlet & Wanzam)	Single	
2014	Woei Soh (ft. Singlet)	Single	
2011	Today be today (ft. Singlet)	Single	
2010	1 Ghana (ft. Wanzam)	Single	
2008	You are a fool to me	Single	
2008	Fantefo na brofoa	Time to love	

== Videography ==
Year	Title	Director	Ref
2020	I Am The Only Me ft. Mau At	Nana Kofi Akromah (Skinny MC)	
2020	Gong Gong Dance ft. Yogot & Too Much	Nana Kofi Akromah (Skinny MC)	
2017	Love Forever	Benny Phame	
2016	Toma Wondzi ft. Singlet & Wanzam	Nana Kofi Akromah (Skinny MC)	
2016	Yaayi	Nana Kofi Akromah (Skinny MC)	
2016	Obolo Lady ft. Nero X	Nana Kofi Akromah (Skinny MC)	
2016	Woei Soh ft. Singlet	Nana Kofi Akromah (Skinny MC)	

== Awards and nominations ==
Year	Event	Prize	Recipient/Nominated work	Result	Ref
2019	RTC Western Music Awards	Collaboration of the year	Himself/YOLO	Won	
2018	RTC Western Music Awards	Hiplife artiste of the year	Himself	Nominated	
2018	RTC Western Music Awards	Hiplife song of the year	Love forever	Nominated	
2018	RTC Western Music Awards	Best Video of the year	Love forever	Nominated	
2017	RTC Western Music Awards	Best Video of the year	Obolo Lady	Won	
2017	RTC Western Music Awards	Hiplife artiste of the year	Himself	Nominated	
