= Ekow =

Ekow is a given name. Notable people with the name include:

- Ekow Benson (born 1989), Ghanaian footballer
- Ekow Duker, South African novelist
- Ekow Eshun (born 1968), Ghanaian-British writer, journalist and broadcaster
- Alfred Ekow Gyan, Ghanaian politician
- Ekow Mensah, Ghanaian social entrepreneur and speaker
- Ekow Quartey (born 1990), British actor
- Ekow Yankah, African American legal professor
