= Joseph Cudjoe (politician) =

Ghanaian politician

Hon. Joseph Cudjoe MP
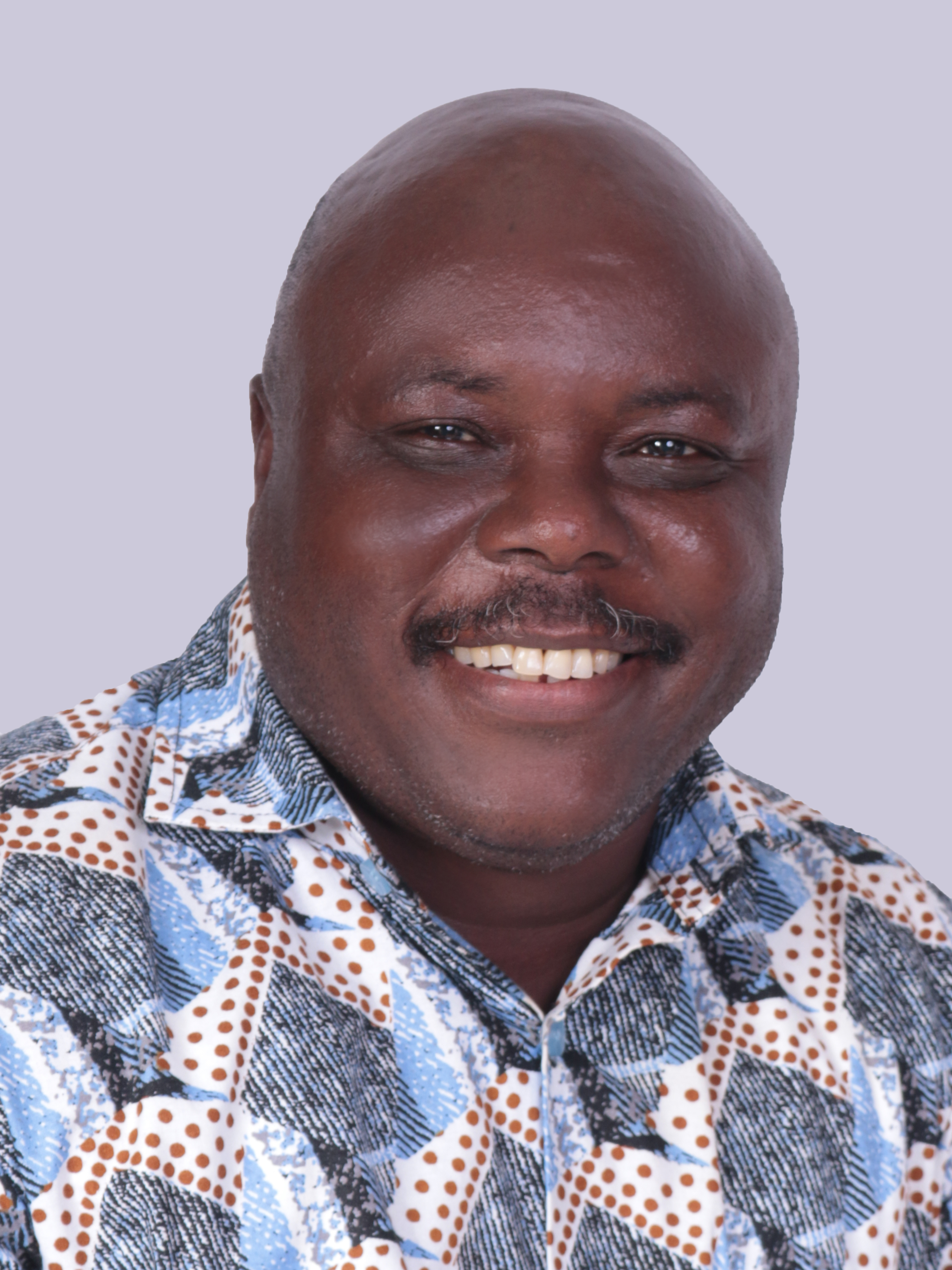

Member of the Ghana Parliament for Effia constituency
- Preceded by: Constituency split

Personal details
- Born: 2 October 1964 (age 61)
- Party: New Patriotic Party
- Spouse: married
- Children: 3
- Education: Kwame Nkrumah University of Science and Technology; University of Ghana
- Occupation: Politician
- Profession: Financial analyst

Joseph Cudjoe is a Ghanaian politician and member of the Seventh Parliament of the Fourth Republic of Ghana representing the Effia Constituency in the Western Region on the ticket of the New Patriotic Party.

== Early life and education ==
Cudjoe was born on 2 October 1964. He hails from Effia a town in the Western Region of Ghana. He received his Bachelor of Science degree in mathematics from the Kwame Nkrumah University of Science and Technology, Kumasi and his MBA in Finance from the University of Ghana.

== Career ==
Joseph Cudjoe started his career as a Mathematics Teacher at the Archbishop Porter Girls Secondary School from January 1995 to October 1995. Cudjoe worked as a lecturer at the Takoradi Technical University from 1995 to 2000. He later joined Eno International, LLC where he worked as a Financial Analysis & Planning Manager from 2000 to 2001. He became a Senior Consultant at SEM International Associates in April 2002 to October 2003 and then later the general manager at SEM International LTD from November 2003 to March 2004.From April 2004 until December 2012, Cudjoe was the Investment Manager for Ghana Cocoa Board.

== Politics ==
Cudjoe entered parliament on 7 January 2013 representing the Effia constituency on the ticket of the New Patriotic Party. He was elected once more to represent the constituency in 2016

In the parliamentary primaries of 2024 for the NPP, he was defeated in his attempt to represent the party by Isaac Nyarko Boamah.

== Personal life ==
Cudjoe is married with three children. He identifies as a Christian.
