= Takoradi Senior High School =

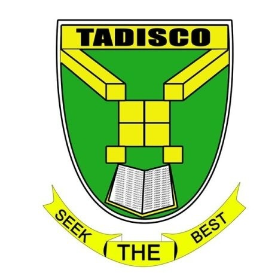

Location
- P. O. Box TD.150; Takoradi, Western Region; Ghana

Information
- Type: Public high school
- Motto: Seek the best
- Religious affiliation: Christianity
- Established: February 1958 (68 years ago)
- Founder: J E Eyeson
- Status: Active
- School district: Sekondi Takoradi Metropolitan Assembly
- Oversight: Ministry of Education
- Head teacher: Mr Akoto Bruce
- Grades: 8-20
- Gender: mixed
- Age: 14 to 18
- Classes offered: Business, general arts, general science, visual arts, Home econs
- Houses: 5
- Colours: Green and yellow
- Song: Our God the Ominipresent
- Nickname: The Seekers
- Affiliation: Tadolsa

Takoradi Senior High School (TADISCO) is a mixed sex second-cycle institution in Takoradi in the Western Region of Ghana.

== History ==
Takoradi Senior High School (popularly known as TADISCO) is a co-educational institute. Originally it was named Regional Secondary School. It is sited in West Tanokrom in the Effia-Kwesimintsim Municipal.it was established in 1958 as a private secondary school by Mr.J.E.Eyeson. Government took over the school at the end of November 1963 and absorbed it into the public system of education, it therefore became Takoradi Secondary School (TADISCO).

== Courses ==
- Business
- General Arts
- General science
- Visual Arts
- Home Economics
- Agriculture
- Computer Science

== Residential Status ==
Takoradi Senior High School operates as both a day and a boarding institution.

== Notable alumni ==
- Fiifi Adinkra, blogger
- Joseph Otsiman, actor, producer and radio presenter/DJ
- WillisBeatz, sound engineer, record producer and DJ
- Nero X, singer, songwriter
- Fiifi Buckman, lawyer and politician
- Paa Kwasi, musical artist and an entrepreneur.

== See also ==
- Christianity in Ghana
- Education in Ghana
- List of senior high schools in Ghana
