= Airport Ridge, Takoradi =

Airport Ridge
- Location in Ghana
- Coordinates: 5°3′N 1°47′W
- Country: Ghana
- Region: Western Region (Ghana)

Airport Ridge is a residential town in the Western region of Ghana. It is about 3 kilometres westwards from Takoradi the regional capital. The town under the Effia-Kwesimintsim constituency of Ghana. It where Takoradi Air Force Base is located

== Boundary ==
The town is bounded to the east by Takoradi Airport and city center, North by Lagos Town, west by Kwesimintsim, and on the South by Beach Road and the Atlantic Ocean.
