= Deon Boakye =

Ghanaian afropop musician

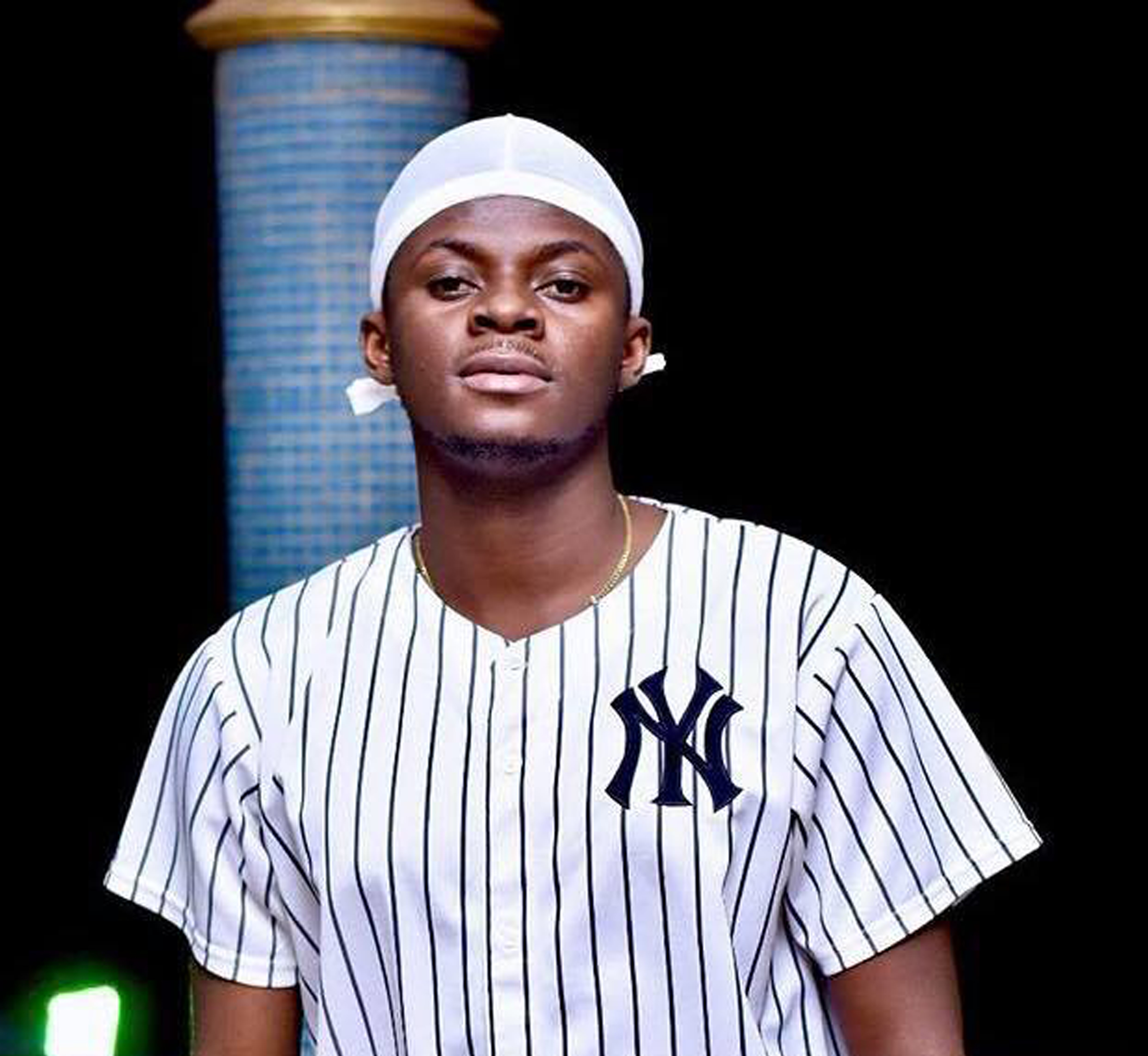
- A picture of Deon Boakye

Background information
- Also known as: Boakye
- Born: Gideon Adade-Boakye; 9 March; Kumasi, Ghana
- Genres: Afropop, Highlife, dancehall, Afrobeats
- Occupations: singer-songwriter, Graphic designer
- Years active: 2009–present
- Labels: Hardboy Music, High Grade Family
- Website: deonboakye.com

Gideon Adade-Boakye (born March 9), better known by stage name Deon Boakye, is a Ghanaian Afro-Pop singer, songwriter and graphic designer. He is known for his single DAB which features AMG's Medikal. In 2018 he signed to HardBoy Music and High Grade Family.

== Early life and music career ==
Deon was born in Kumasi. Inspired to make music by his love for it and the passion for music in his family. At the age of 7, his parents signed him up to study music at church and he further developed interest for music.

=== 2009–present ===
Deon's solo career started with the single ‘Allewa’, released in 2009 with a feature from Cabum. He came out with other singles like Dubai, New Year and Babiaa Awu. he was nominated for the 'Unsung Artiste Award' at the 2017 Ghana Music Awards. he has featured collaborations with several artists such as Medikal, Cabum, Ko-Jo Cue, M.anifest and more.

In September 2017, he released his 'Green' Lp. A 17 track LP, which features 16 artists: Strongman, Flowking Stone, Kojo-Cue, Medikal, Kofi Kinaata, Jason EL-A, Haywaya, Akiti Wrowro, Eno, Ayesem, Singlet, Cool Joe, Cabum, Afezi Perry, Joel Orleans, Ayesem and Projexx from Jamaica.

On 14 April 2018, Deon was announced as one of the newly signed acts to Samini's High Grade Family. The announcement came following Samini's performance at the Ghana Music Awards 2018.

== Singles ==
- "Ooosh"
- "Konongo Kaya" ft Strongman
- "You Do All"
- "Guy Guy" ft Kofi Kinaata, Kojo Cue & Cool Joe
- "Green LP"
- "Wavy"
- "Bebiaa Awu" ft KinG Prinz
- "Coded"
- "AWURE(wedding)"
- "Malaika"
- "Abena Rose"
- "Kekedzi"
- "Ma Ware"

== Videography ==
Year	Title	Director	Ref
2017	You Do All	Prince Dovlo	
2017	Wavy	Looksfx and Psyroskobe	
2017	DAB ft Medikal	Benn Koppoe	
2017	Ooosh	Benn Koppoe	
2018	Ma Ware	Benn Koppoe	

== Awards and nominations ==
=== Ghana Music Awards ===
Year	Nominee / work	Award	Result
2017	Himself	Unsung Artist	Nominated

== See also ==
- Music of Ghana
- List of African musicians
