= Fijai =

- Village
- Location in Ghana
- Coordinates: 4°57′17″N 1°44′55″W
- Country: Ghana
- Region: Western Region (Ghana)
- Time zone: GMT
  - Summer (DST): GMT

Fijai is a village in the Western region of Ghana. It is 11 kilometres from Takoradi, the region's capital. The village serves as a dormitory village for workers who work in and around the Takoradi metropolis.

== Boundaries ==
The village borders Nkroful to the east, Botumagyabu to the west, Effia to the north and Sekondi to the south.

== Notable place ==
The Fijai Secondary School, a co-educational second-cycle school, is in the village. For over fifty years, the school has produced men and women who are found in different industries in Ghana.
