= Adinkra =

Adinkra may refer to

- Adinkra symbols that represent concepts or aphorisms
- Adinkra symbols (physics) used in the supergravity theory
- Fiifi Adinkra (born 1987), Ghanaian blogger and publicist
- Joseph Narh Adinkra, Chief of Staff of the Ghana Army
