= Mavis Owusu-Gyamfi =

Ghanaian political economist

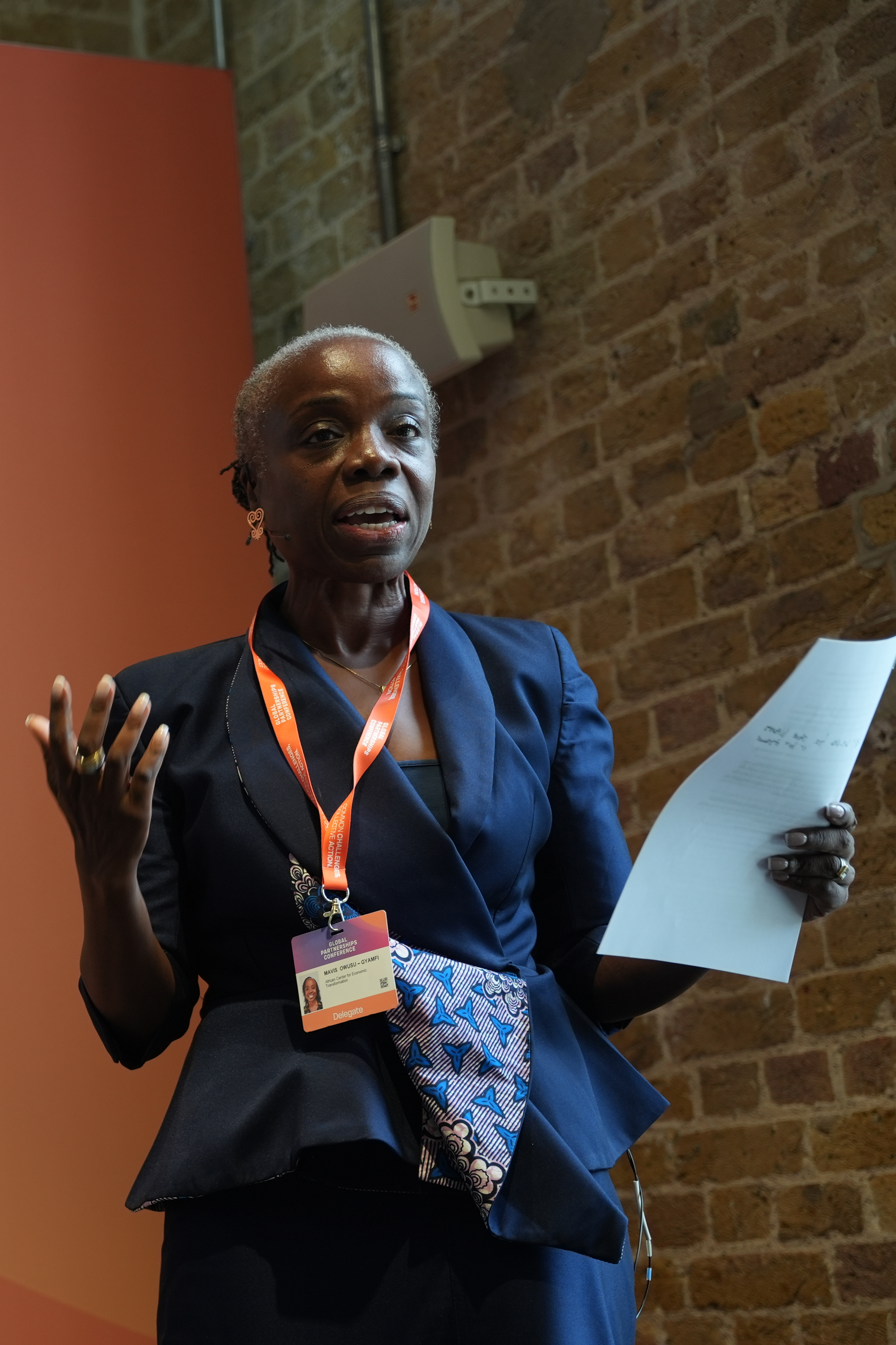
- Education: University of Sussex
- Occupation: economist

Mavis Owusu-Gyamfi is a Ghanaian political economist and international development specialist. She serves as the President and chief executive officer of the African Center for Economic Transformation (ACET), a policy institute focused on advancing economic transformation and sustainable development across Africa.

== Education and affiliations ==
Owusu-Gyamfi holds a Master of Philosophy (MPhil) from the University of Sussex.

She is also a Desmond Tutu Leadership Fellow, a fellowship of the African Leadership Institute, which recognizes emerging African leaders committed change across the continent.

== Career ==
Owusu-Gyamfi has more than twenty-five years of experience in economic and social policy development, working across Africa, Asia, and the Caribbean with international development organizations and government institutions.

Before becoming president and CEO of ACET, she served as Executive Vice President of the organization, a position created in June 2020, and began her role in July 2020. In that capacity, she played a key role in shaping ACET's strategic direction, strengthening partnerships, mobilizing resources for the institute's long-term sustainability, and expanding its research, advisory, and policy advocacy work.

Prior to joining ACET, Owusu-Gyamfi worked at the UK Department for International Development (DFID), where she led the development and implementation of private sector development strategies in several countries. She later served as Director of Investments at The Power of Nutrition, overseeing the organization's expansion across multiple African and Asian countries.

Owusu-Gyamfi also held the role of Director of Programme Policy and Quality at Save the Children UK, where she contributed to global programme strategy and implementation.

== Areas of expertise ==
Her work focuses on:

- Economic transformation and development policy
- Private sector development
- Poverty reduction strategies
- International development partnerships
