= Ekow Barnes =

Ghanaian Fashion Writer and Content Producer

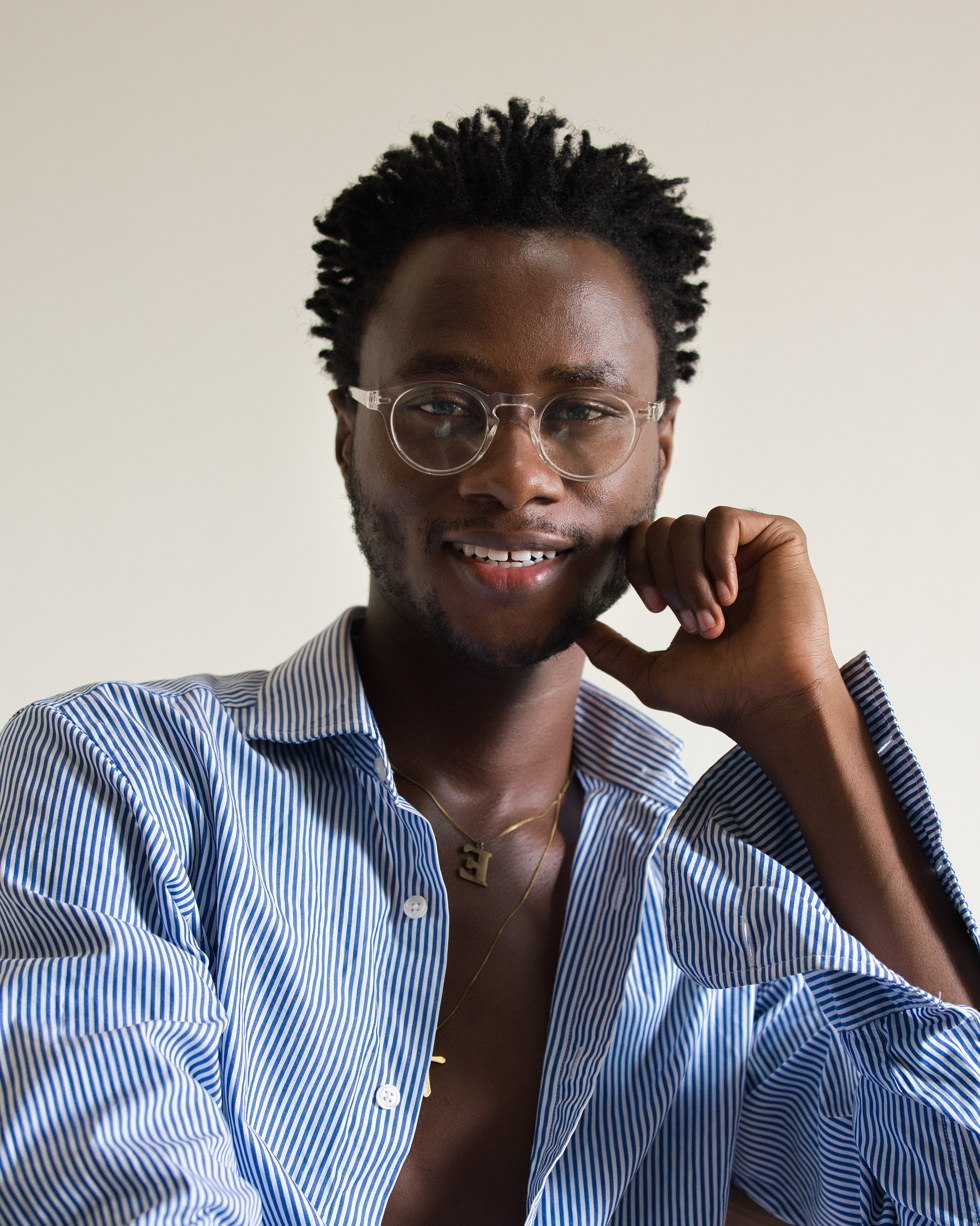
- Portrait of Ekow
- Born: Richmond Ekow Barnes; Accra, Ghana
- Education: Ghana Secondary Technical School; Bluecrest College
- Occupations: Fashion writer and Creative Content Producer

Richmond Ekow Barnes, also known as Ekow Barnes, is a Ghanaian fashion writer producing fashion content across Africa.

== Early life and education ==
Ekow Barnes was born in the Western Region of Ghana and attended the Ghana Secondary Technical School. He attended Bluecrest University College, where he earned a Bachelor of Arts degree in Public Relations and Image Management.

== Career ==
Barnes started his career at Strategic Communications Africa as a PR intern. Ekow later became a fashion consultant at Will & Barnes in Accra. He has also worked as a model for fashion brands.

Barnes has 20+ publications from different magazines and editorials across continents. He has worked on numerous projects involving brands including Facebook, Burberry, the airline Emirates, Mercedes Benz, Essence, Glamour Magazine, Uber, Chiip 0 Neal, and many others.

Barnes recently started a New Balance football boots campaign for Senegalese player Sadio Mane at the 2022 AFCON tournament in Cameroon.

In 2022, he co-founded the WB Group, a production company aimed to promote African creators though international brands.
