= Ayesem =

Ghanaian hiphop artist

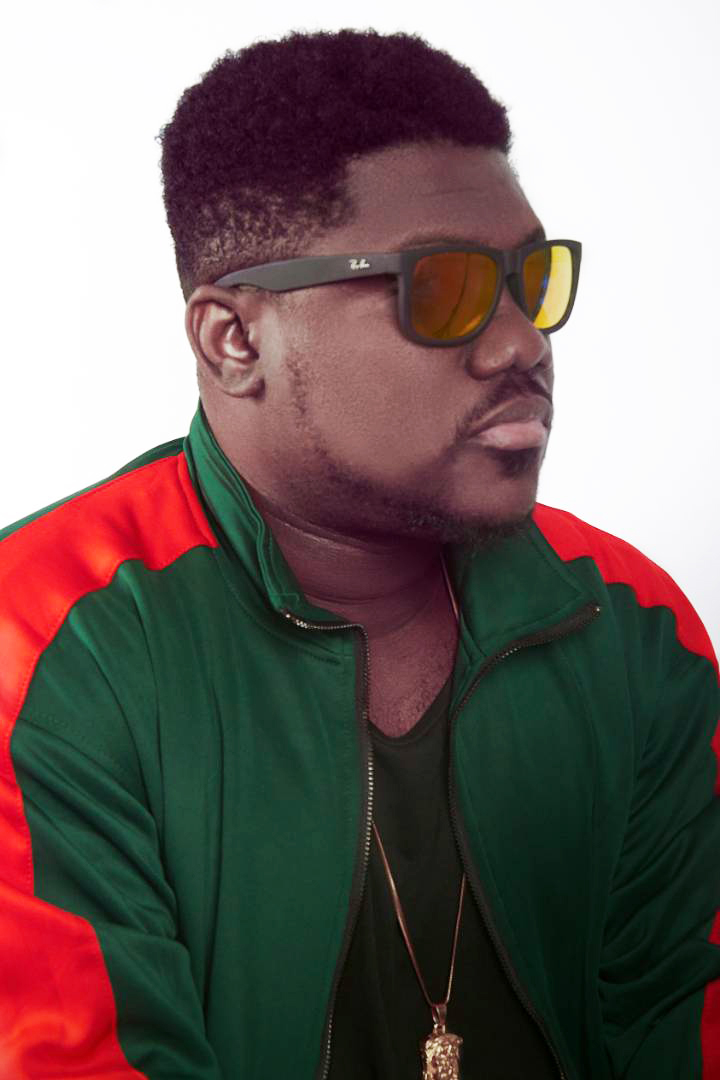

Background information
- Also known as: Sketches
- Born: Stephen Kwabena Siaw; 1 April 1986 (age 40); Takoradi, Ghana
- Origin: Ghana
- Genres: Hip hop, Hiplife
- Occupations: Rapper, Songwriter
- Instrument: Vocals
- Years active: 2006–present
- Label: Shocks Entertainment

Stephen Kwabena Siaw (born 1 April 1986), known by his stage name Ayesem, is a Ghanaian hip hop and hiplife recording artist from Takoradi. He is best known for his hit single, "Koti".

== Early life and education ==
Ayesem was born and raised in Takoradi, in the Western Region of Ghana. He attended Ghana Secondary Technical School, where he completed his senior secondary education. Ayesem then studied at Takoradi Polytechnic, graduating with a Higher National Diploma in 2013.

== Music career ==
He began his career as a member of the group 'Trinity' in 2006. He later formed a music group called '2Unit' with fellow musician Nero X. As a group, their songs received radio airplay in the Western and Central Region of Ghana.

Ayesem has collaborated with artists such as Castro, Old Solja, Kurl Songx, Kofi Kinaata, Epixode, and Singlet. Currently signed to Shocks Entertainment, Ayesem has worked with producers such as WillsBeatz and Ivan Beatz.

== Videography ==
Year	Title	Director	Ref
2018	Relationplane ft. Kurl Songx	Snares Films	
2018	Dede	Skinny MC	
2017	Difference ft. Epixode	Skinny MC	
2017	Satan ft. Singlet	Yaw Skyface	
2017	Koti	Nana Kofi Akromah	
2014	Checki Wo BP ft. Zeal (VVIP)	David Wincott	

== Awards and nominations ==
Year	Event	Prize	Recipient / Nominated work	Result	Ref
2018	Ghana Music Awards UK	Uncovered Artist of the Year	Himself	Won	
2018	Western Music Awards	Artist of the Year	Himself	Nominated	
2018	Western Music Awards	Most Popular W/R Song of the Year	Koti	Won	
2018	Western Music Awards	Highlife Song of the Year	Koti	Won	
2018	Western Music Awards	Hiplife Artist of the Year	Himself	Nominated	
2017	Western Music Awards	Hiplife Artist of the Year	Himself	Won	
2017	Western Music Awards	Most Popular Song of the Year	Satan	Nominated	
2017	Western Music Awards	Best Rapper of the Year	Himself	Won	
2017	Western Music Awards	Best Collaboration of the Year	Satan ft Singlet	Nominated	
2017	Western Music Awards	Best Music Video of the Year	Satan	Nominated	
2017	Central Music Awards	Most Popular Ghanaian Song of the Year	Koti	Nominated	

== Discography ==
=== Singles ===
Year	Title	Producer	Ref
2018	Smoke Dem	Methmix	
2018	Relationplane	Ivan Beatz	
2017	Dede	WillisBeatz	
2017	Koti	WillisBeatz	
2016	Difference ft Epixode	ChrisBeatz	
2014	Satan ft Singlet	WillisBeatz	
