= Ghana Senior High Technical School (Takoradi) =

Senior high technical school in Sekondi-Takoradi, Western Region, Ghana

Ghana Secondary Technical School
- GSTS

Location
- Pobee Biney Rd, Takoradi; Sekondi-Takoradi, Western Region; Ghana
- Coordinates: 04°53′52″N 01°44′59″W

Information
- Type: Secondary Technical
- Motto: Mente et Manu (With mind and hands)
- Established: 9 August 1909; 116 years ago
- Status: Active
- School district: Sekondi Takoradi Metropolitan Assembly (STMA)
- GES Category: A
- Headmaster: Rev. Kennedy Obeng
- Chaplain: Rev. Aaron Adabo (Methodist)
- Teaching staff: 50
- Grades: Form 1 to 3
- Gender: Boys
- Enrollment: 2700+
- Campus: Residential
- Houses: 1-Ritchie; 2-Vanderpuye; 3-Weston; 4-Opong (formerly Robinson); 5-Aryee; 6-Dodoo; 7-Kennedy; 8-Einstein; 9-Cobbinah; 10-Mensah; 11-Unnamed; 12-Unnamed
- Colors: Bright yellow walls with crimson structural members and fascia.
- Athletics: Track, field and courts
- Mascot: Mother Tesco - oldest and tallest tree on campus which has recently been cut down.
- Nickname: The Giants/Tescan
- Rival: St John's School.
- National ranking: 3
- Yearbook: The Tescan
- Affiliation: GSTS Alumni Association.
- Flagship society: Army (Infantry) Cadet Corps, est 1954.
- Traditional colors: Burgundy and white
- Uniform color: Tan
- Courses: General Science; Technical; General Arts; STEM
- Website: www.gsts.school

The Ghana Secondary Technical School is a science and technology-oriented high school located in Takoradi on the west coast of Ghana. It is the third oldest high school in Ghana — the oldest 'non-missionary' high school. The School was founded on 9 August 1909 in Accra as Accra Technical School and later changed to Government Technical School. It moved to its current site in Takoradi in 1939. In 1953, the name was changed to Government Secondary Technical School, and in 1970, it was given its current name. Former students of the school are known as Giants, and students in the school are called Tescans.

== History ==
The school was started in 1909 as a pure Technical School and was then sited at the former premises of the Accountant General (the current site of Kinbu Secondary Technical School in Accra). It was founded in response to the growing demand for technical education in the British colonies at that time.

In 1939, the school was moved to Takoradi. The first head was Mr. T. T. Gilbert. The first African head was Mr. J.W.L. Mills, who took up his post in 1958. A sixth-form was introduced in 1961.

The school's name changed from Government Secondary Technical School to Ghana Secondary Technical School in 1970.

For a brief period in the mid-nineteen-seventies students were admitted as part of military training. This started with Intake 15 of the then Military Academy and Training Schools. They underwent a combination of regular academic work with intermittent military training during holidays.

== List of principals and headmasters ==
Name	Designation	Tenure
Mr. H.A. Wright	Principal	1909–1916
Mr. Pickles	Principal	1917–1918
Mr. McLaren	Principal	1918–1938
Lt. Col. T. T. Gilbert	Acting Principal	1938–1946
Major T. C. Watkins	Acting Principal	1947–1953
Mr. A. A. Jones	Principal	1953–1954
Mr. F. E. Joselin	Headmaster	1955–1957
Mr. J. W. L. Mills	Headmaster	1957–1959
Mr. I. N. K. Atiase	Headmaster	1960–1961
Mr. S. N. Adu-Ampomah	Headmaster	1961–1965
Mr. D. V. Owiredu	Headmaster	1965–1968
Mr. R. W. Asiedu	Acting Headmaster	1968–1969
Mr. S. T. Lomotey	Acting Headmaster	1969–1970
Mr. B. W. De-Graft Johnson	Headmaster	1971–1973
Mr. A. R. Cudjoe	Headmaster	1973–1980
Mr. B. E. Godwyll	Headmaster	1980–1983
Mr. P. B. Tuwor	Headmaster	1983–1990
Mr. D. S. Gamor	Acting Headmaster	1990–1991
Mr. I. K. Adams	Headmaster	1991–1996
Mr. T. K. Mensah	Headmaster	1996–2013
Mr. A. Adams	Headmaster	2013–2015
Mr. S.K.Essel	Headmaster	2015 to 2021
Rev. Kennedy Obeng	Headmaster	2021-

== Achievements ==
- Winners of the 2012 National Science and Maths Quiz Competition(And two times runner up)
- Winners of the 62nd Independence Quiz Competition
- 2014 best WASSCE student was a Tescan.
- On 11 June 2018, 14 students from Ghana Secondary Technical School (GSTS) Takoradi represented Ghana Genius Olympiad hosted at Suny Oswego University in New York City, United States of America (USA) started from June 11 to 18, 2018.

=== Sports ===
- Winners of the Aggrey Shield in 1957 in Kumasi.
- 2009 National basketball champions at the National Milo Schools' Sports Festival in Kumasi.
- .
- Winners of zonal inter school athletics competition with close to 40 titles since the inception of the competition (regional record holder in highest number of wins).
- Soccer champions in Takoradi Zonal Inter School competition on more than seven occasions.* Winners of the 2015 Edition of the Osagyefo Cup.

=== Extra curricular activities ===
- First school in the Gold Coast to establish a cadet corps (in 1954).

=== NSMQ ===
In 2025, the Ghana Secondary Technical School (GSTS) from Takoradi achieved a remarkable feat by eliminating Presbyterian Boys’ Senior High School (PRESEC), Legon from the National Science and Maths Quiz (NSMQ). GSTS triumphed in the quarter-finals with 39 points, narrowly defeating PRESEC’s 38 points and Our Lady of Grace SHS’s 28 points. They were later edged out by the previous winners, Mfantsipim School.

== Notable alumni ==
Academics

- Kwesi Akwansah Andam — vice chancellor of Kwame Nkrumah University of Science and Technology
- Ebenezer Oduro Owusu — vice chancellor of University of Ghana
- Agyeman Badu Akosa — professor of Pathology, former Director of Ghana Health Service, politician and social commentator
- Yaw Yeboah — Former Dean of Engineering Penn State, Fmr. Dean, Professor Florida Dean of the College of Engineering at the Florida Agricultural and Mechanical University and Florida State University (FAMU-FSU), USA
- Rev. Dr. David Asante Dartey – Longest Serving General Secretary of The Christian Council of Ghana And Founding Principal for Wisconsin University.

Science and technology

- Ashitey Trebi-Ollennu — aerospace engineer at NASA and JPL
- Alexander Anim-Mensah — chemical engineer and inventor

Sports

- Augustine Ahinful — Football player

Politics and governance

- Fred Ohene-Kena — former Minister for Mines and Energy
- Mike Hammah — former NDC member of Parliament for Winneba (Effutu Constituency)
- Nana Akomea — Ghanaian politician (New Patriotic Party)
- Hon. Alfred Ekow Gyan — politician, former Deputy Western Regional Minister
- William Agyapong Quaitoo — member of Parliament for Akim Oda Constituency, former Deputy Minister for Agriculture
- Francis Edward Techie-Menson — politician, member of parliament and Minister of State during the first republic
- Richard Quarshigah — politician, member of parliament and Minister of State

Military

- Joseph Narh Adinkra — former Chief of Army Staff
- Tom Annan — former Chief of Naval Staff
- Stephen Obimpeh — former Chief of Naval Staff of the Ghana Navy, former minister of state
- Matthew Quashie — former Chief of Defence Staff of the Ghana Armed Forces
- Peter Kofi Faidoo — chief of naval staff

Others

- Odeneho Gyapong Ababio II — traditional ruler and chief
- DopeNation — Ghanaian musical duo
- Ayesem — Ghanaian rapper
- Corp Sayvee — Ghanaian hiplife artist
- K.Y. Amoako — founder of the African Centre for Economic Transformation
- David Anaglate — newsman and former GBC Director-General

== School Code ==
0040104
