= Nero X =

Ghanaian musician

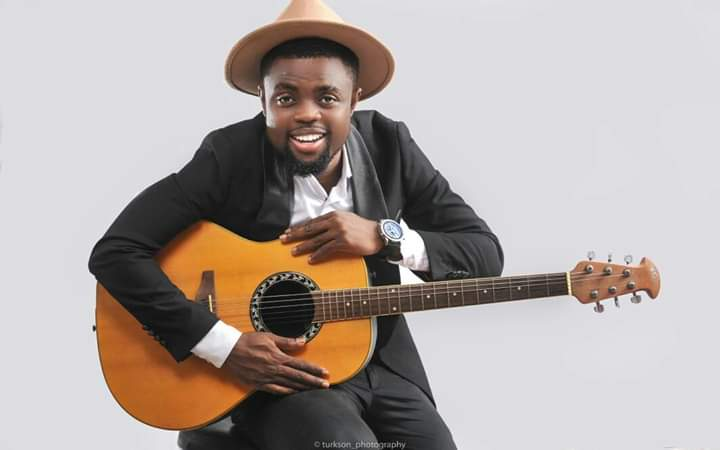

Background information
- Also known as: Nero X
- Born: Joseph Nkrumah Buabeng; Takoradi, Ghana
- Origin: Ghana
- Genres: Hiplife, Highlife, Afro pop
- Occupations: Songwriter; Performer; Instrumentalist
- Instruments: Vocals; Lead guitar; Drums
- Years active: 2006–present

Joseph Nkrumah Buabeng known professionally as Nero X is a Ghanaian singer and songwriter. He is best known for his hit single "Osey".

== Early life and education ==
Joseph Buabeng was born and raised in Lagos Town a suburb in the Western region of Ghana. Nero X attended Takoradi Secondary School and later attended Takoradi Technical University.

== Music career ==
He started his music journey in 2005 as a member of the group '2Unit' with fellow musician Ayesem. They would later contest in the Nescafe African Revelations reality show that same year. In 2010 Nero X emerged the second runner up of ‘Star Grab the Mic’ organized by Empire Entertainment.

In 2013, he won in the maiden edition of Viasat 1 TV's Born Starz. Nero X released his first single ‘Osey’ in 2015 which topped major Ghanaian music charts. He will go on to release Otan, Nyame Dadaw, Nyimpa Nua among others.

Nero X has worked with artistes such as Castro, Teephlow, Nana Quame, KK Fosu, Guru, Okyeame Kwame, FlowKing Stone, Tinny, etc.

== Videography ==
Year	Title	Director	Ref
2019	Jehovah	Mexxstudios	
2019	Be Thankful ft Teephlow	C-Links Media	
2018	S3 Asa	Nana Kofi Akromah	
2018	Okwan So Brebre ft K.K Fosu	Nana Kofi Akromah	
2018	Winner	Christopher Daniels	
2017	Yawa Dey	Mexx studios	
2017	Assom Ruff	Justice Kloutse	
2017	Secret	Nana Kofi Akromah	
2017	Peace and Love	HD Media Production	
2017	Nipa Nua	Yaw Skyface	
2016	Frema	Stanley Adjetey	
2015	Osey	Stanley Adjetey	
2015	Hosanna ft Yoggie Doggie	LAM, XVIC TV	
2015	Nyame Dadaw	Nana Kofi Akromah	

== Awards and nominations ==
=== Vodafone Ghana Music Awards ===
Year	Recipient / nominated work	Award	Result	Ref
2016	Himself	Highlife Artiste of the Year	Nominated	

=== RTC Western Music Awards ===
Year	Recipient / nominated work	Award	Result	Ref
2019	Winner	Best music video of the year	Nominated	
2019	Winner	Urban gospel song of the year	Nominated	
2019	Winner	Afropop song of the year	Nominated	
2019	Se Asa	Most popular regional song	Nominated	
2019	Moon lightning	Highlife song of the year	Nominated	
2019	Himself	Highlife artiste of the year	Nominated	
2019	Himself	Artiste of the year	Nominated	
2018	Himself	Highlife artiste of the year	Won	
2018	Himself	Highlife artiste of the year	Won	
2017	Osey	Most Popular song of the year	Won	

=== Ghana Music Awards UK ===
Year	Recipient / nominated work	Award	Result	Ref
2018	Himself	Highlife artiste of the year	Nominated	
2018	Himself	Highlife song of the year	Nominated	
2017	Frema	Highlife song of the year	Nominated	

=== MTN 4stye Music Video Awards ===
Year	Recipient / nominated work	Award	Result	Ref
2016	Hosanna	Best Gospel Video	Won	

== Discography ==
=== Major Singles ===
Year	Title	Production	Ref
2018	Winner	WillisBeatz	
2017	Yawa Dey	WillisBeatz	
2017	Osey	WillisBeatz	
2015	Nyame Dadaw ft Teephlow	Ephraimbeatz	
