= Alexander Anim-Mensah =

Ghanaian-American Chemical engineer, inventor and author

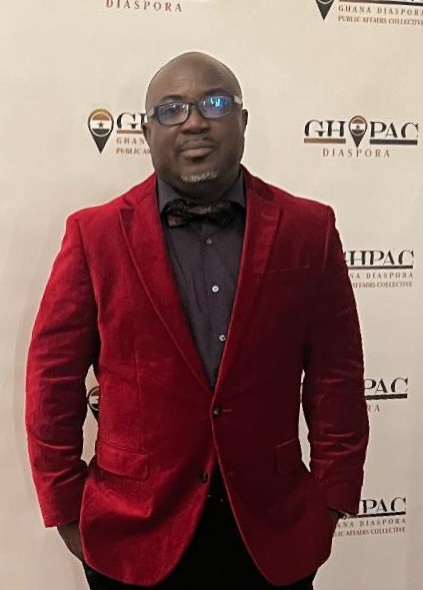
- Born: Takoradi, Ghana
- Education: Ghana Senior High Technical School (Takoradi); Kwame Nkrumah University of Science and Technology; Massachusetts Institute of Technology
- Occupation: Chemical engineer
- Known for: Contributions towards the field of membrane science and technology
- Honors: ITW's Distinguished Patent Fellow

Alexander Anim-Mensah, also known as Alexander Raymond Anim-Mensah, is a Ghanaian-American chemical engineer, inventor, and author. He is especially known for contributions he made towards the field of membrane science and technology. He is a recipient of the Illinois Tool Works' Distinguished Patent Fellow Award.

== Life and career ==
Anim-Mensah was born in Takoradi Ghana to two Kwahu parents. His late father, Kwame Anim-Mensah, was both a businessman and cocoa farmer while his late mother Kate Animah was a homemaker. He is one of thirteen children. He had his primary education at the Young Christian Preparatory School in Sekondi-Takoradi Ghana; and his secondary education at the GSTS where he obtained his Ordinary Level ("O") and Advanced Level ("A") certificates in Science and Technical education.

He obtained his PhD, MSc., and BSc in chemical engineering from the University of Cincinnati-Ohio, and also studied at North Carolina A&T State University, and the KNUST, respectively. Some of his numerous specializations include Technology, Operations and Value Chain Management Capability from the Massachusetts Institute of Technology Sloan School of Management. Intellectual Property Law & Policy from the University of Pennsylvania, Business Strategy from the University of Virginia Darden Business School, Global Energy Business from the University of Colardo, Marketing Mix Implementation from the IE Business School Madrid - Spain and Executive Certificates in both Advanced Project Management & Project Leadership from the University of Dayton - Ohio.

Anim-Mensah started his career with an internship in 1995 at the West African Mills Co LLC (WAMCO) and in 1997 at the Ghana Cement Works all in Takoradi Ghana. He obtained his chemical engineering bachelor's degree around 1998 at the KNUST and then taught science and math at the Takoradi Secondary School in Takoradi Ghana early in 1999 as part of a required one-year National service. At the end of his National Service he joined Ghana's Tema Oil Refinery as a process and environmental engineer in early 2000, processing crude oil and managing its waste products. He then left Ghana after a year to North Carolina to pursue his master's degree in chemical engineering specializing in liquid carbon dioxide (liq-CO_{2}) separation and recovery from process solutions without phase change enhanced by micelles in a crossflow microfiltration. In 2003 he enrolled at the University of Cincinnati-Ohio's PhD chemical engineering program specializing in membrane science & technology specifically assessing solvent resistant polymeric nanofiltration membranes for small molecule purification and solvent recovery for re-use and other specialties.

He has worked at Procter & Gamble Cincinnati-Ohio, Siemens Water Technologies-Colorado, Veolia Water Technologies-Ohio, and currently works as the engineer manager with ITW's Food Equipment Group in the Dayton, Ohio area. He obtained his PhD, MSc and BSc in chemical engineering from the University of Cincinnati-Ohio and studied at North Carolina A&T State University, Executive Certificate Construction Project Management from Columbia University, NY and then KNUST. He is a recipient of the Illinois Tool Works' Distinguished Patent Fellow Award.

Recipient of 2023 Black History & Lifestyle award, 2022 Award for Contribution Towards the Membrane Science & Technology Field.

== Research ==
His contribution included the use of acoustics, specifically ultrasonic time-domain reflectometry (UDTR) for real-time investigation of solvent resistant polymeric membranes behaviors under compaction or swelling in organic environment.

Anim-Mensah used this already known UDTR technique for real-time studying of these specific polymeric membranes mechanical behavior while permeated during separation. The UDTR technique allowed correlating real-time polymeric membrane behaviors especially to their compaction and/or swelling characteristics to their performance which he defined a membrane dimensionless number β as the logarithmic of the ratio of swelling to compaction (i.e. β = log (Ls/Lc)) as important parameter underlying many polymeric membranes performance in organic solvent separation. The swelling obtained from the real-time swelling (Ls) data while membrane is not permeated and allowed to swell until steady state and the compaction (Lc) data obtained in real-time when the swollen membrane is compacted during permeation under a transmembrane pressure. This swelling and compaction data as well as the ratio provides some insight in understanding these membranes performances as well as being helpful in the design and selection of polymeric membranes and their solvent for optimum separation performance in the organic solvent environment.

Anim-Mensah is involved in some thirty (30) inventions secured by US and international patents in areas including sensing, energy recovery, improved chemical & water use efficiencies, refrigeration & heat pumps, optimization, process & product improvements, waste minimization, and environmental impacts reduction.

In 2019, he was a recipient of the Illinois Tool Works Distinguished Patent Fellow Award He has co-written two books and some technical papers in the area of membrane science and technology In his book Prediction of Polymeric Membrane Separation and Purification Performances he showed mathematically how the logarithm of ratio of membrane swelling (Ls) and compaction (Lc) measured in real-time correlated well with the membrane performance data (i.e. rejection) provided some insights.

== Volunteer/educational engagements ==
As an innovation value chain processes and management specialist, Anim-Mensah was featured on the VOA NightLife Africa Radio on the subject of "How Effectively Harnessing of African Ideas is The Bedrock of African Industrialization". He was featured on "Africa Must Industrialize Now: The Urgency for Value Addition to Africa Products" Webinar by AfCFTA Policy Network which featured Thomas Mensah (engineer) of Ghana, and Alvin Alexander, system engineer and founder at Orion Applied Science & Technology OrionAST. The Doctor cofounded two NGOs all in Ghana with some like-minded colleagues, as a way of giving back to especially support the youths as part of his public educational activities to support them to take their ideas to make positive globe impacts. Among others, he serves on several boards and holds membership in organizations including serving as an External Advisory Board Member at the University of Cincinnati's Chemical and Environmental Engineering Program; and is on the board member of SAYeTECH Co. LLC, a small agriculture equipment business in Ghana
