= Sista Afia =

Ghanaian musician

- Also known as: Sista Afia
- Born: Franchesca Duncan Williams Gawugah; 8 November 1994 (age 31); Accra, Ghana
- Origin: Accra, Ghana; London, United Kingdom
- Genres: Alternative rock, indie rock, highlife and afrobeats
- Instrument: Vocals
- Years active: (2015–present)
- Label: Ace Kandi Records/BK Records

Franchesca Duncan Williams Gawugah (born 8th November 1994) known by the stage name Sista Afia, is a Ghanaian singer and songwriter from Accra. She gained recognition following the release of her single "Jeje", which features dancehall artist Shatta Wale and Afezi Perry.

== Early life and career ==
Sista Afia is an Afro-pop musician, and the niece of Ghanaian Bishop Nicholas Duncan-Williams. She grew up in Accra and Kumasi. She attended Reverend John Teye Memorial Institute before relocating to the UK to further in nursing studies.

Sista Afia returned to Ghana in 2015 to start her music career. She took inspiration from musician Bisa Kdei and collaborated on the song 'Kro Kro No'.

== Charity work ==
Sista Afia, founder of the Sista Cooks Foundation, has fed thousands of vulnerable children and women across the country over the years. She urged her fellow musicians to join forces in giving back to society and helping transform the lives of the underprivileged.

== Controversies ==
Sista Afia engaged in a physical banter with rapper Freda Rhymz after a lyrical banter.

== Singles ==
| Year | Title | Producer | Album | Ref |
|---|---|---|---|---|
| 2015 | Kro Kro Nofeaturing Bisa Kdei | | | |
| 2016 | Are You Ready | | Queen Solomon | |
| 2016 | Yiwani featuring Kofi Kinaata | | | |
| 2016 | Kofi | | | |
| 2016 | Jeje featuring Shatta Wale | | Queen Solomon | |
| 2017 | Bokoorr featuring Medikal | | Queen Solomon | |
| 2017 | Pass U | | | |
| 2017 | Obi Boy | | | |
| 2018 | Slay Queen | | Queen Solomon | |
| 2019 | "Conner Conner" featuring Kelvynboy | Ivan Beatz | | |
| 2019 | "Weather" featuring Medikal and Quamina MP | | Xbillz Ebenezer | |
| 2020 | "Paper" featuring Victor AD | | Xbillz Ebenezer | |
| 2021 | Sisi (Broken) | | N/A | |
| 2021 | Sista Afia & Kuami Eugene - ASUODEN | Ivan Beatz | | |
| 2024 | "2 Things" featuring Amerado | IzJoe Beatz | | |

== Awards and nominations ==
| Year | Event | Prize | Recipient / Nominated work | Result | Ref |
|---|---|---|---|---|---|
| 2021 | Vodafone Ghana Music Awards | Best Highlife Artiste | Herself | Nominated | |
| 2021 | Vodafone Ghana Music Awards | International Collaboration Of The Year | Paper ft Victor AD | Nominated | |
| 2021 | Vodafone Ghana Music Awards | Best Highlife Song of the Year | Party ft Fameye | Nominated | |
| 2019 | 3Music Awards | Female Woman of the year | Herself | Nominated | |
| 2020 | Ghana Music Awards | Hip-life song of the Year | Weather | Nominated | |
| 2020 | Ghana Music Awards | High-Life Song of the Year | Corner Corner | Nominated | |
| 2019 | 3Music Awards | Female Woman of the year | Herself | Nominated | |
| 2018 | 3Music Awards | Female act of the year | Herself | Nominated | |

== Videography ==
| Year | Title | Director | Ref |
|---|---|---|---|
| 2019 | Conner Conner ft Kelvynboy | Xbillz Ebenezer | N/A |
| 2018 | Sista Afia & Sarkodie studio session | | N/A |
| 2018 | Champion Atta | Steve Gyamfi | N/A |
| 2018 | Sista Afia performs at Despite and Special health fair 2018 | Satiango | N/A |
| 2018 | Slay Queen | Eddie Kumako | N/A |
| 2017 | Pass U | Yaw Skyface | N/A |
| 2017 | Bokoo ft Medikal | Prince Dovlo | N/A |
| 2017 | Jeje Featuring Shatta Wale | Yaw Skyface | —N/a |
| 2016 | Yiwani ft Kofi Kinaata | Prince Dovlo | N/A |
| 2016 | Are You Ready | Prince Dovlo | N/A |
| 2015 | Kro Kro No ft Bisa Kdei | Prince Dovlo | N/A |
| 2019 | Weather FtMedikal& Quamina MP | Xbillz Ebenezer | N/A |
| 2020 | Paper Ft Victor AD | Xbillz Ebenezer | N/A |
| 2020 | Sika ft Kweku Flick | Nestville Film | N/A |
