= K. Y. Amoako =

Ghanaian international civil servant (born 1944)

- Born: September 13, 1944 (age 82)
- Education: Ph.D. in Economics, University of California-Berkeley
- Occupations: Founder and President of ACET
- Organization: The African Centre for Economic Transformation (ACET)
- Known for: African development, Gender Inclusion and Empowerment, Policy Analysis, Thought Leader, Social Innovator

K. Y. Amoako (born September 13, 1944) is a Ghanaian international civil servant with a five-decade career in African development. He is a thought leader on policies and initiatives of governance and growth on the continent, and he has worked alongside development specialists to address African and global development issues.

Amoako is the Founding President of the African Centre for Economic Transformation (established 2008) and an author. Amoako founded ACET following his career at the World Bank beginning in 1974 until he became the Bank's Director for Education and Social Policy from 1992 to 1995. In 1995, he served as the Executive Secretary of the Economic Commission for Africa (ECA) at the rank of Under Secretary General of the UN. After his 10 years with the ECA, Amoako spent 2006 as a Distinguished African Scholar at the Woodrow Wilson International Center for Scholars.

== Personal life ==
Amoako is married to Philomena Amoako and has three daughters named Ama, Nana, and Mame. He also has four grandchildren: Jonah, Kofi, Mena, and Kare.

== Education and career ==
=== Education ===
Amoako completed his secondary education at the Ghana Secondary Technical School. He then obtained his B.A. (Hons) from the University of Ghana and his M.A. and Ph.D. in economics from the University of California at Berkeley. In recognition of his contribution to Africa's development, in 2003, he was awarded a Doctor of Laws degree, honoris causa, by the Addis Ababa University, and a Doctor of Letters degree, honoris causa, by the Kwame Nkrumah University of Science and Technology, Ghana, in May 2005.

=== World Bank ===
After obtaining a Ph.D. in economics from the University of California-Berkeley in 1974, Amoako began his career at the World Bank. At the time, the Bank employed few Africans, but it impacted much of the continent's destiny through lending policies that were not always favorable to Africa. Amoako became Division Chief for Country Programs in the Africa Region and also Division Chief for Sector Programs in the Latin America and Caribbean Region. Over a ten-year period, he helped improve Bank operations in several countries.

In the early 1990s, the Bank began to shift its focus by placing greater emphasis on poverty reduction and underserved but vital economic and social development issues, such as gender equality. To provide intellectual leadership in these areas, guide operational staff at the country-level, and collaborate more effectively with United Nations agencies and other development institutions, the Bank created the Department of Education and Social Policy in 1992. Amoako was appointed its first director. He led a group of 40 economists and sector specialists in producing major Bank policy papers on poverty, gender, social protection, labor markets, and education that were endorsed by the World Bank's Executive Directors.

=== United Nations Career ===
In 1995, then UN Secretary General Boutros Boutros-Ghali appointed Amoako as the Executive Secretary of the United Nations Economic Commission for Africa (ECA) at the level of Under-Secretary General. He gave Amoako a mandate to transform the institution into an influential voice for Africa and an effective player in global development. Within two years of his appointment, Amoako implemented sweeping reforms to remake the institution. Boutros-Ghali later commended the ECA for being “at the vanguard of reform in the United Nations.”

=== The Wilson Center/The Woodrow Wilson International Center ===
In 2006, K.Y. Amoako was awarded with the "Distinguished African Scholar Award", supported by the Open Society Institute, which brings senior African scholars or policymakers to the Woodrow Wilson Center in order to conduct research on topics of their choice. His research focused on "strengthening policy research institutions within Africa and their contribution to African development strategies".

=== The African Center for Economic Transformation ===
Amoako founded the African Center for Economic Transformation (ACET) in 2008 to help African governments transform their economies and address policy and institutional barriers to economic growth, with operations based in Accra, Ghana.

== Contributions to African and Global Development ==
Over the past twenty years, Amoako has served on many high-level commissions and task forces with other development experts and leaders. These task forces and commissions have tackled Africa's current and future challenges as well as global development issues. They include:

- Commission on HIV/AIDS and Governance in Africa—Chaired by Amoako, the commission was established in 2003 by Kofi Annan. The commission had a mandate to clarify the data on the impact of HIV/AIDS on state structures and economic development and to assist governments in consolidating the design and implementation of policies and programs to help govern the epidemic.
- Commission for Africa—Set up in 2004 and chaired by then British Prime Minister Tony Blair to promote development in Africa, the commission published its report, “Our Common Interest,” in 2005. Many of the recommendations were taken up by the G8 at its summit in Gleneagles later that year, and in other commitments made to Africa.
- Commission on Macroeconomics and Health— The Commission on Macroeconomics and Health (CMH) was established by then WHO Director-General Dr. Gro Harlem Brundtland in January 2000 to assess the contribution of health to global economic development. Prof. Jeffrey Sachs chaired the commission.
- International Task Force on Global Public Goods—Established in 2003 by the Swedish and French governments on the heels of the 2002 Monterrey International Conference on Financing for Development, the task force provided a definition of global public goods, identified global public goods critical for poverty reduction, and proposed recommendations to enhance their provision and financing.
- Commission on Capital Flows to Africa—Jointly assembled in September 2002 by the Corporate Council on Africa and the Institute for International Economics and chaired by James A. Harmon, former chairman of the US Export-Import Bank, the Commission published a “Ten-Year Strategy for Increasing Capital Flows to Africa” to help boost capital and private sector investment from the United States.
- High-Level Trade Experts Group—Set up by David Cameron and Angela Merkel to revitalize the Doha Round of trade talks and lobby for strong political commitment during the Seoul G20 summit to liberalize trade, the group was led by Peter Sutherland, the former Director-General of the WTO, and Jagdish Bhagwati, a renowned professor of economics at Columbia University.

Speaking at a meeting of African finance ministers in 1997, Amoako declared himself “an optimist for Africa”.

== Published works ==
=== Book: "Know the Beginning Well: An Inside Journey Through Five Decades of African Development" (2020) ===
The title of the book is based on an African proverb: "If you know the beginning well, the end shall not trouble you". The book draws on his five decades of experience to offer an account of the people, policies, and institutions that have shaped Africa's post-colonial development history with a goal of learning from the past to better inform the future. Amoako has lived this history, worked directly with governments and global leaders on issues that continue to affect African progress: financing sustainable development, moving beyond aid, industrializing and diversifying economics, closing the gender gap, getting regional integration right, and attaining accountable and transformative leadership. This book recounts the growth of Africa offers a hopeful vision of a transformed continent.

Amoako, K.Y. Know The Beginning Well: An Inside Journey Through Five Decades of African Development. Africa World Press, 2020.

== Other ==
He delivered the lecture "Politics, Economics and the Future of Ghana" on the occasion of the 10th Anniversary Memorial Lecture of the late Oyeeman Wereko Ampem 11 organized and held by the University of Ghana with support from the John A. Kufuor Foundation and the Atta Mills Foundation. He was the Guest Speaker at the Ghana Secondary Technical School Centenary Anniversary in October 2009.
