= Effia =

- Village
- Location in Ghana
- Coordinates: 4°56′N 1°46′W
- Country: Ghana
- Region: Western Region (Ghana)
- Time zone: GMT
  - Summer (DST): GMT

Effia is a village in the Western region of Ghana. It is about 10 kilometres from Takoradi, the regional capital.

== Boundaries ==
The village is bounded to the west and north by Effiakuma, to the east by Fijai, and to the south by Anaji.
