= Philip Fiifi Buckman =

Ghanaian politician

Philip Fiifi Buckman is a Ghanaian politician and a member for Kwesimintsim, Ghana. He is affiliated with the National Democratic Congress (NDC). He secured a decisive victory in the Kwesimintsim constituency in the year 2024. He was born on Wednesday, 28th February 1973.

== Education ==
Institution	Qualification	Completed
Ghana School of Law	Barrister at Law	07-2011
University of Ghana	Barchelor of Art	07-2000
Swedru Secondary School	Advanced level	07-1994
Takoradi Secondary School	Ordinary level	07-1990
