= WillisBeatz =

Ghanaian record producer

- Born: William Osafo; August 30, 1991 (age 34); Takoradi, Ghana
- Genres: Afro-pop, R&B, Hip hop, Afrobeat, Highlife, Hiplife,
- Occupations: sound engineer, record producer and DJ
- Instruments: Vocals, Digital audio workstation
- Years active: 2009–present

William Osafo, known professionally as WillisBeatz, is a Ghanaian-born sound engineer, record producer and DJ from Takoradi. He is best known for producing Shatta Wale's hit singles "Taking Over","Forgetti","Sponsor" by Ebony Reigns and "Osey" by Nero X. WillisBeatz was nominated in the " Best Music Producer of the Year" category at the 2017 Ghana Entertainment Awards (USA).

== Early life ==
WillisBeatz, was born on August 30, 1991, in Takoradi. At age 17, William already had love for music and started learning music productions using the Internet. He attended the Takoradi Senior High School.

== Production career ==
As a producer, WillisBeatz has been credited for working with most Ghanaian artists and producing hit songs like "'DON'T GO THERE", "TAKING OVER" and "FORGETTI" by Shatta Wale"Samba" by Gurunkz"Sponsor" by Ebony Reigns "Osey" by Nero X "Papabii" by Gallaxy and "Made In Taadi" by Kofi Kinaata.

== Awards and nominations ==
Year	Award ceremony	Prize	Recipient	Result	Ref
2017	Rush Western Music Awards	Music Producer of the Year	Himself	Won	
2017	Ghana Entertainment Awards, USA	Music Producer of the Year	Himself	Nominated	
2017	Ghana Music Awards, UK	Music Producer of the Year	Himself	Won	

== Production discography ==
=== Singles ===
- 2013
1. Castro: Jealousy
- 2014
1. Nero X: Osey
- 2015
1. Gallaxy: Papabi
2. Kofi Kinaata: Made it Taadi
- 2016
1. Shatta Wale: Nana vs Mahama
2. Shatta Wale: Don't Go There
3. Gurunkz: Samba
- 2017
1. Shatta Wale: Taking Over
2. Shatta Wale: Forgetti
3. Shatta Wale: Open N Close
4. Shatta Wale: Skin Pain
5. Shatta Wale: Freedom
6. Ebony Reigns: Sponsor
7. Ebony Reigns: Maame Hw3
8. Kofi Kinaata: Last Show
9. Shatta Wale: Umbrella
10. Koti: Ayesem
11. MzVee: Sing My Name
