= Isaac Yaw Boamah-Nyarko =

Ghanaian politician

Isaac Yaw Boamah-Nyarko is a Ghanaian politician and a member of the New Patriotic Party (NPP). He represents Effia constituency of the western region in the 9th Parliament of the 4th Republic of Ghana.

== Early life and education ==
He was born on 22 March 1979. He hails from Effiduase town in the western region of Ghana. He completed his O Level and A Level education at Adisadel College and Prempeh college in 1994 and 1996, respectively. He continued his tertiary education at the University for Development Studies (UDS) where he attained his Bachelor of Arts in integrated development studies in 2002 and Master of Sciences in development planning and management at Kwame Nkrumah University of Science and Technology in 2007.

He furthered his education at the University of London, where he attained a first university degrees in Bachelor of Law (LLB) and enhanced his experienced at the Ghana School of Law in 2012 and 2015 respectively.

== Career ==
He served as board secretary for Ghana Revenue Authority.
