= Prince Hamid Armah =

Member of Parliament for Kwesimintsim in the Western Region of Ghana

Member of Parliament for Kwesimintsim

Personal details
- Born: 6 October 1981 (age 45) Kwesimintsim
- Party: New Patriotic Party
- Profession: Politician; Educationist
- Website: princeharmah.com

Prince Hamid Armah (born 6 October 1981) is a member of the New Patriotic Party and the Member of Parliament for Kwesimintsim Constituency in the Western Region of Ghana.

He previously served as the Director General of the National Council for Curriculum and Assessment.

== Early life and education ==
Dr. Armah was born in Kwesimintsim in the Western Region of Ghana, where he had his basic education before proceeding to St John’s Secondary School in Sekondi. From there, he went to the University of Education, Winneba, where he obtained both his Bachelor’s and Master’s degrees in Mathematics Education.

He later earned a Doctor of Philosophy in Mathematics Education, with specialization in Curriculum, Pedagogy and Education Policy at the University of Aberdeen, UK. Also, Armah holds certificates in Quantitative Methods from the Doctoral Training Centres of the University of Edinburgh, the University of Manchester, and the University of Nottingham.

== Career ==
In January 2019, he was appointed as the Executive Secretary of the National Council for Curriculum and Assessment. Following the passing of the Education Regulatory Bodies Act 2019, he was appointed as the first (acting) Director General of the curriculum body.

== Political life ==
On June 20, 2020, he defeated then incumbent Member of Parliament, Mr Joe Mensah in the party’s parliamentary primary, polling 222 votes against his opponent’s 167. In December, he defeated two other challengers to retain the Kwesimintsim seat for the New Patriotic Party with 24,759 votes, well ahead of his closest contender, who polled 13,385. He is currently Vice Chairman of the Parliamentary Select Committee on Education and a member of the House Committee.

He has been appointed as the Deputy Minister-designate for the Works and Housing Ministry.
