= Joseph Mensah (politician) =

Ghanaian politician

Member of the Ghana Parliament for Kwesimintsim Constituency
- In office 2016–2020
- Preceded by: Hon. Joseph Badu Ansah
- Succeeded by: Dr. Prince Hamid Armah
- Majority: NPP

Personal details
- Born: 22 August 1957 (age 68)
- Party: New Patriotic Party

Joseph Mensah (born 22 August 1957) is a Ghanaian politician and former member of the Seventh Parliament of the Fourth Republic of Ghana representing the Kwesimintsim Constituency in the Western Region on the ticket of the New Patriotic Party.

== Education ==
He got a diploma in education and a B.A in Social Sciences from the University of Cape Coast, his Master's degree from the University of Antwerp, Belgium, and a member of the Chartered Institute of Logistics Transport.

== Personal life ==
He is a Christian.

== Career ==
Joseph Mensah held the following positions at the Ghana Ports and Harbours; operations manager from 2013 to 2016, human resource manager from 2005 to 2016, training manager from 1998 to 2013, and accounts supervisor from 2013 to 2016.

== Politics ==
Joseph Mensah is a member of New Patriotic Party and was the member of parliament for Kwesimintsim (Ghana parliament constituency) in the Western Region in Seventh Parliament of the Fourth Republic of Ghana.

=== 2016 election ===
Joseph Mensah contested for the Kwesimintsim constituency in the Western Region on the ticket of New Patriotic Party during the 2016 Ghanaian general election and won the election with 20,382 votes representing 64.50% of the total votes. He won the election over Augustine Arthur of National Democratic Congress, Nana Abakah of Convention People's Party, Samuel Kwabena Antwi of PPP and Richard Kwame Amissah of IND. They obtained 8,260 votes, 1,637 votes, 987 votes and 332 votes respectively. These is equivalent to 26.14%, 5.18%, 3.12% and 1.05% of the total votes respectively.

=== New Patriotic Party 2020 Primaries ===
Joseph Mensah contested the New Patriotic Party 2020 primaries to be elected as the parliamentary candidate for Kwesimintsim constituency but lost the election to Prince Hamidu Armah.
