= Effia (Ghana parliament constituency) =

Ghanaian constituency

Amenfi Central
- constituency for the Parliament of Ghana
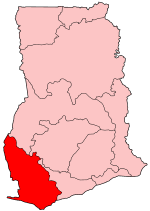
- District: Effia-Kwesimintsim Municipal District
- Region: Western Region of Ghana

Current constituency
- Party: New Patriotic Party
- MP: Isaac Yaw Boamah-Nyarko

Effia is one of the constituencies represented in the Parliament of Ghana. It elects one Member of Parliament (MP) by the first past the post system of election. Isaac Yaw Boamah -Nyarko is the member of parliament for the constituency. Sekondi is located in the Sekondi Takoradi Metropolitan Assembly of the Western Region of Ghana.

== Members of Parliament ==
Election	Member	Party
2016	Joseph Cudjoe	New Patriotic Party
2020	Joseph Cudjoe	New Patriotic Party
2024	Isaac Yaw Boamah-Nyarko	New Patriotic Party
