= Kwesimintsim (Ghana parliament constituency) =

Constituency in Ghana

Kwesiminstim
- constituency for the Parliament of Ghana
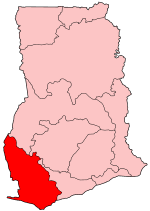
- District: Effia-Kwesimintsim Municipal District
- Region: Western Region of Ghana

Current constituency
- Party: National Democratic Congress
- MP: Philip Fiifi Buckman

Kwesimintsim is a constituency represented in the Parliament of Ghana. It elects one Member of Parliament (MP) by the first past the post system of election. Philip Fiifi Buckman is the member of parliament for the constituency. The Kwesimintsim constituency is located in the Effia-Kwesimintsim Municipality of the Western Region of Ghana.

== Members of Parliament ==
Election	Member	Party
2016	Joseph Mensah	New Patriotic Party
2020	Prince Hamid Armah	New Patriotic Party
