= List of awards and nominations received by Kofi Kinaata =

Kofi Kinaata awards and nominations
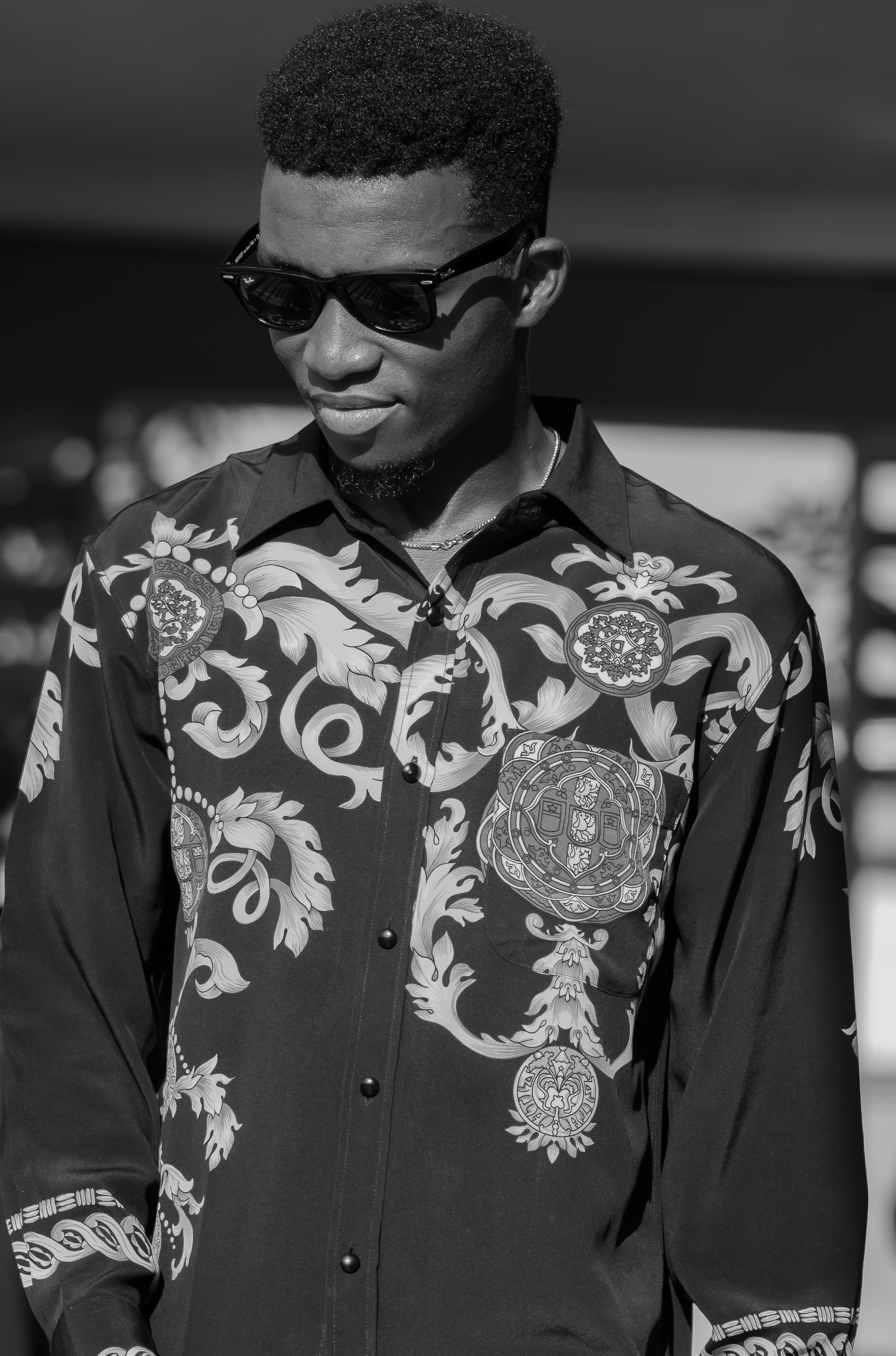
Awards and nominations
Award	Wins	Nominations
Africa Entertainment Legends Awards	0	1
All Africa Music Awards	0	1
Ghana Music Awards	11	5
Central Music Awards	1	1
Ghana Music Awards UK	1	1
Ghana Music Honors	1	1
Ghana Entertainment Awards	1	1
Western Music Awards	1	1
Ghana Event Awards	0	2
3 Music Awards	5	2
Ghana Tertiary Awards	1	1
Muse Africa	1	1
MTN 4Syte TV Music Video Awards	0	3
National Gospel Music Awards	1	1
Ghana Actors and Entertainers Awards	1	1
Ghana Music Awards UK	3	0
Ghana Music Awards USA	5	0
EMY Africa Awards	1	0
Youth Excellence Awards	1	0

Totals (Note: Certain award groups do not simply award one winner. They acknowledge several different recipients, have runners-up, and have third place. Since this is a specific recognition and is different from losing an award, runner-up mentions are considered wins in this award tally. For simplification and to avoid errors, each award in this list has been presumed to have had a prior nomination.)
- Wins: 33
- Nominations: 15

This is a list of awards and nominations received by Ghanaian highlife musician and songwriter Kofi Kinaata.

Kinaata has received multiple awards and nominations for his work in the Ghanaian music industry, particularly for his songwriting. He has won the Songwriter of the Year award multiple times at the Vodafone Ghana Music Awards, and has also been recognised for the social impact of his music, including receiving the Vodafone Green Award in 2021.

== Awards and nominations ==
=== Africa Entertainment Legend Awards ===
Year	Recipient / Nominated work	Award	Result	Ref
2016	Kofi Kinaata	Fast Rising Artist	Nominated	

=== All Africa Music Awards ===
Year	Recipient / Nominated work	Award	Result	Ref
2016	Kofi Kinaata	New Comer Award	Nominated	

=== Millenium Excellence Awards ===
Year	Recipient / Nominated work	Award	Result	Ref
2025	Kofi Kinaata	Youth in Entertainment	Won	

=== Ghana Music Awards ===
Year	Recipient / Nominated work	Award	Result	Ref
2016	Susuka	Writer of the year	Won	
2016	Kofi Kinaata	Best New Artiste of the Year	Won	
2017	Confession	Highlife Song of the Year	Won	Nyabor, Jonas (9 April 2017). "All award winners at 2017 VGMAs". Ghana News.
2017	Confession	Highlife Artiste of the Year	Won	Nyabor, Jonas (9 April 2017). "All award winners at 2017 VGMAs". Ghana News.
2017	Confession	Songwriter of the Year	Won	Nyabor, Jonas (9 April 2017). "All award winners at 2017 VGMAs". Ghana News.
2018	Last Show	Songwriter of the Year	Nominated	
2020	Kofi Kinaata	Highlife artiste of the Year	Nominated	"3Music Awards Ghana 2020: All the nominees". Music in Africa. 31 January 2020.
2020	Kofi Kinaata	Songwriter of the Year	Won	"3Music Awards Ghana 2020: All the nominees". Music in Africa. 31 January 2020.
2020	Kofi Kinaata	Artiste of the Year	Nominated	"3Music Awards Ghana 2020: All the nominees". Music in Africa. 31 January 2020.
2020	Things Fall Apart	Most popular song of the Year	Won	"3Music Awards Ghana 2020: All the nominees". Music in Africa. 31 January 2020.
2020	Things Fall Apart	Highlife song of the Year	Won	"3Music Awards Ghana 2020: All the nominees". Music in Africa. 31 January 2020.
2021	Behind the scenes	Songwriter of the Year	Won	
2021	Illegal Fishing	Vodafone Green Song Of the Year	Won	"See winners & nominees of 2021 Vodafone Ghana Music Awards". BBC News Pidgin.
2022	Thy Grace Pt.1	Best Highlife song	Won	"VGMA23: Check out the full list of winners - MyJoyOnline.com". www.myjoyonline.com. 2022-05-07.
2022	Thy Grace Pt.1	Songwriter of the year	Nominated	
2022	Kofi Kinaata	Best Highlife artiste	Nominated	
2023	Kofi Kinaata	Best Highlife Artist of the Year	Won	
2024	Kofi Kinaata	Best Highlife Artist	Nominated	
2024	Kofi Kinaata	Best Reggae Dancehall Song of the Year	Won	
2025	Saman	Songwriter of the Year	Won	
2026	It Is Finished	Best Highlife Artiste of the Year	Won	

=== Central Music Awards ===
Year	Recipient / Nominated work	Award	Result	Ref
2016	Susuka	Most popular song in Ghana	Won	

=== Ghana Music Awards UK ===
Year	Recipient / Nominated work	Award	Result	Ref
2016	Kofi Kinaata	Best New Act	Won	
2017	Kofi Kinaata	HIghlife Artiste of the Year		
2017	Never Again	Highlife Song of the Year	Nominated	

=== Ghana Music Honors ===
Year	Recipient / Nominated work	Award	Result	Ref
2017	Kofi Kinaata	Best Hiplife Act	Won	

=== Ghana Entertainment Awards ===
Year	Recipient / Nominated work	Award	Result	Ref
2017	Kofi Kinaata	Best Highlife Act	Won	

=== Western Music Awards ===
Year	Recipient / Nominated work	Award	Result	Ref
2017	Kofi Kinaata	Artiste of the Year	Won	

=== Ghana Event Awards ===
Year	Recipient / Nominated work	Award	Result	Ref
2017	Made in Taadi Concert	Regional Events of the Year	Nominated	
2019	Made in Taadi Concert	Regional Events of the Year	Nominated	

=== 3 Music Awards ===
Year	Recipient / Nominated work	Award	Result	Ref
2017	Team Move	Fan Army of the Year	Won	
2020	Kofi Kinaata	Hiplife/Hip Hop Act of the Year	Nominated	
2020	Things Fall Apart	Song of the Year	Won	
2020	Things Fall Apart	Highlife Song of the Year	Won	
2022	Thy Grace (Part 1)	Highlife Song of the Year	Won	
2022	Kofi Kinaata	Highlife Act of the Year	Won	
2022	Thy Grace (Pt.1)	Hiplife Song of the year	Nominated	

=== Ghana Tertiary Awards ===
Year	Recipient / Nominated work	Award	Result	Ref
2018	Kofi Kinaata	Music Excellence	Won	

=== Muse Africa ===
Year	Recipient / Nominated work	Award	Result	Ref
2019	Kofi Kinaata	Highlife Act of the Quarter	Won	

=== MTN 4Syte TV Music Video Awards ===
Year	Recipient / Nominated work	Award	Result	Ref
2019	Adam and Eve	Best Highlife	Nominated	
2019	Adam and Eve	Best Storyline	Nominated	
2021	Behind The Scenes	Best Highlife Video	Nominated	

=== National Gospel Music Awards ===
Year	Recipient / Nominated work	Award	Result	Ref
2019	Things Fall Apart	Hybrid Song of the Year	Won	

=== Ghana Actors and Entertainers Awards ===
Year	Recipient / Nominated work	Award	Result	Ref
2019	Kofi Kinaata	Hiplife Artiste of the Year	Won	

=== Western Showbiz Awards ===
Year	Recipient / Nominated work	Award	Result	Ref
2018	Kofi Kinaata	Western Best Male Artiste	Won	
2018	Kofi Kinaata	Indigenous Music Artiste	Won	

=== Ghana Music Awards USA ===
Year	Recipient / Nominated work	Award	Result	Ref
2020	Things Fall Apart	Most Popular Song of The Year	Won	
2020	Things Fall Apart	HighLife Song of The Year	Won	
2020	Kofi Kinaata	HighLife Artiste of The Year	Won	
2021	Behind the scenes	Highlife song of the year	Won	
2022	Kofi Kinaata	Artiste of The Year	Won	

=== EMY Africa ===
Year	Recipient / Nominated work	Award	Result	Ref
2022	Kofi Kinaata	Man of The Year	Won	

=== Youth Excellence Awards ===
Year	Recipient / Nominated work	Award	Result	Ref
2020	Kofi Kinaata	Music Act of the Year	Won	
