= Kingzkid =

Ghanaian Christian hip pop recording artist and songwriter

- Also known as: Kingzkid
- Born: Emmanuel Essuman Mensah
- Genres: Gospel Hip pop Afrobeat
- Occupation: Musician
- Years active: 2013–present

Emmanuel Essuman Mensah (born September 29, 1989), known as Kingzkid, is a Ghanaian Christian hip hop recording artist and songwriter. He is the first African Gospel Musician to win the Gospel Academy Awards Best International Act 2019 award.

== Music career ==
Kingzkid released his first album "Vindicated" in 2011 and "Metamorphosis" in 2014. He is the President of Gifted Music Records and Founder of "Amplified" a youth movement which also hosts an annual concert dubbed Amplified Concert which aims at winning souls for Christ.

He has collaborated and performed with numerous gospel musicians, including Mali Music, Tim Godfrey, Ohemaa Mercy Joe Mettle, MOG Music, Micah Stampley, Sinach, Denzel Prempeh, Nii Okai.

== Discography ==
=== Albums ===
- Vindicated (2011)
- Metamorphosis (2014)

Selected Singles

- I got my Jesus on
- He go do for you
- Thy kingdom come

== Awards and nomination ==
Year	Event	Award	Nominated work	Result	Ref
2019	Gospel Academy Awards	Best International Act	Himself	Won	
2019	Africa Gospel Awards	Hip pop song of the year	Himself	Won	
2015	4syte TV Music Video Awards	Best gospel video of the year	Himself	Won	
