= Yaw Skyface =

Ghanaian filmmaker

- Born: Isaac Adu Mensah; Feb 18, 1988 (age 38); Kwahu, Abetifi
- Origin: Eastern Region, Ghana
- Occupations: cinematographer, filmmaker, music video director
- Years active: 2009–present
- Website: apstairsmedia.com

Isaac Adu Mensah (born February 18, 1988), professionally known as Yaw Skyface, is a Ghanaian filmmaker, director and cinematographer. His debut film Door 2 Door was met with mostly positive reviews upon its release in 2017.

== Early life ==
Yaw was born in (Kwahu Abetifi, Eastern Region). He spent part of his childhood growing up in Takoradi, until his family moved to Accra. After graduating from Takoradi Polytechnic in 2008, he began working as a video director in 2009.

== Film directions ==
=== Filmography ===
- Door 2 Door (2017)

==== Music videos ====
Year	Artist	Song	Notes
2012	Iwan	"Miss You"	Co-director (with Apstairs)
2012	Nate A-Eshun	"Na Love"	Director
2013	Jah Kumbo	"Qualify"	Director
2014	Yaa Pono	"Amen"	Director
2014	Drilix	"Inferno"	Director
2014	Billy Banger	"Party 6"	Director
2015	Ebony Reigns	"Dancefloor"	Director
2015	Unyx	"Ekpi"	Director
2015	Emphraim	"Baby Alhaji"	Director
2015	Flexclusive & Dr Cryme	"Woman"	Director
2015	Donzy & Kofi Kinaata	"The Crusade"	Director
2016	Bisa Kdei	"JWE"	Director
2016	Donzy, Sarkodie& Piesie	"Club"	Director
2016	Bisa Kdei & Obrafour	"Samina"	Director
2016	Samini & Kofi Kinaata	"Mama Ghana"	Director
2016	Ebony Reigns	"Kupe"	Director
2016	Unyx	"Masi Mad"	Director
2017	Ebony Reigns	"Sponsor"	Director
2017	Joey B & King Promise	"Sweetie Pie"	Director
2017	Donzy & Spicer	"Heart Away"	Director
2017	Sista Afia & Shatta Wale	"Jeje"	Director
2017	Bisa Kdei	"Apae"	Director
2017	Asaase & Yaw Pono	"Julie"	Director
2017	Kofi Kinaata	"Confession"	Director
2017	Kofi Kinaata	"Last Show"	Director
2017	Kofi Kinaata	"Time No Dey"	Director
2017	Kelvyn Bwoy & Medikal	"Toffee"	Director
2017	Ebony Reigns	"Turn Up the Light"	Director
2017	Bisa Kdei & Reekado Banks	"Feeling"	Director
2018	Stephanie Benson	"All About Love"	Director
2018	Keche	"Next Level"	Director
2018	Bisa Kdei	"Hammer"	Director
2018	Strongman & Kuami Eugene	"Baby Girl"	Director
2018	DJ Mensah & Bisa Kdei	"Dancefloor"	Director
