= Kwesimintsim, Ghana =

Town in Western Region of Ghana

Coordinates: 4°54′N 1°47′W

Kwesimintsim
- Interactive map of Kwesimintsim
- Country: Ghana
- Region: Western Region (Ghana)

Kwesimintsim is a residential town in the Western region of Ghana. It is about 5 kilometres westwards from Takoradi the regional capital. The town under the Effia-Kwesimintsim constituency of Ghana.

== Boundary ==
The town is bounded to the west by Apremodo to the east by Takoradi to the North by Anaji and south by Airport Ridge.
