= Effiakuma =

- Town
- Location of Effiakuma in Western Region
- Coordinates: 4°55′26″N 1°45′44″W
- Country: Ghana
- Region: Western Region
- District: Stma District

Population (2013)
  - Total: 35,094
- Ranked 47th in Ghana
- Time zone: GMT
  - Summer (DST): GMT

Effiakuma is a residential town in the Western region of Ghana. It is about 10 kilometres from Takoradi, the regional capital. It was built in the early 1960s by the then-president of Kwame Nkrumah. There are about three general plans for the buildings in the town. The State Housing Corporation built the houses. Effiakuma is the forty-seventh most populous town in Ghana, with a population of 35,094 people. On the outskirts of the town is the settlement of Effiakuma Zongo (Zongo is a Hausa language term for a travelers' camp).

In March 2011, many Mossi Muslims who fled the conflict in Ivory Coast took refuge in the town.

== Boundary ==
The town is bounded to the west and North by Takoradi, to the east by Effia, and to the south by Anaji.
