= Fiifi Adinkra =

Ghanaian blogger

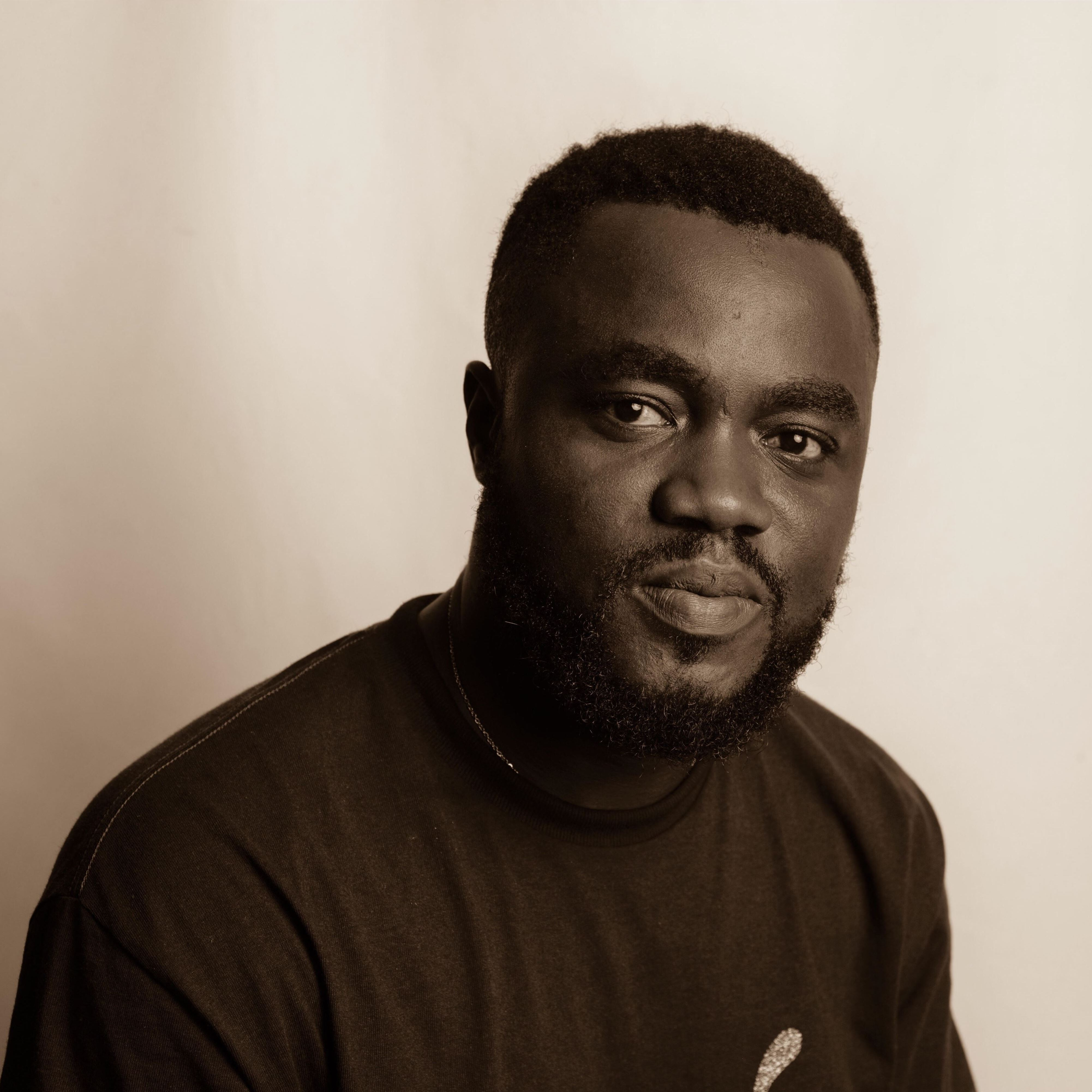
- Born: Prince Fiifi Cudjoe; Takoradi, Ghana
- Education: Takoradi Technical University
- Occupations: Blogger, freelance journalist, reporter, publicist
- Known for: celebrity gossip
- Website: www.fiifi.org

Prince Fiifi Cudjoe, popularly known as Fiifi Adinkra, is a Ghanaian blogger known for GhanaNdwom.net.

== Career ==
Adinkra is the founder of GhanaNdwom.net, an online show business hub in Ghana, and is also the CEO of Adinkra Metrix Multimedia LTD.

He has worked with Stonebwoy, Bisa Kdei, Gasmilla, Okyeame Kwame, Legendary Rechordz, and Chase.

In 2015, Adinkra was nominated for "Digital Personality Of The Year" and GhanaNdwom.net was nominated for "Best Music Platform" at the Swish HQ Ghana digital awards.

In 2017 and 2018, he was listed on GhanaTalk's Most influential Bloggers in Ghana and was ranked 5th on Avance Media's Top 50 Ghanaian Bloggers respectively.

== Awards and nominations ==
Year	Event	Prize	Nominated work	Result	Ref
2015	Swish HQ Ghana digital awards	Digital Personality Of The Year	GhanaNdwom.net	Nominated	
2019	Ghana Actors and Entertainers Awards	Best Blogger Of The Year	Himself	Nominated	
