= Global Music Awards Africa =

- Current: Global Music Awards Africa 2022
- Awarded for: Outstanding Achievement in the music industry
- Country: Ghana
- Presented by: Smart Focus Media
- First award: March 20, 2021
- Website: Official website

GMAA 3D Plaque

Global Music Awards Africa (also referred to as GMAA Awards or GMAA) is an annual award, presented by Smart Focus Media. GMAA honors outstanding musical accomplishments in Africa, with the goal to discover the next African star. The first edition was supposed to hold on 6 March 2021, at Accra International Conference Centre in Ghana. Due to COVID-19 regulations in Ghana, it was held virtually on 20 March 2021, at AICC. The most recent ceremony was held on 16 April 2022 at Lagos Oriental Hotel in Nigeria.

== History ==
On 6 February 2021, Global Music Awards Africa took to their social media to unveil a 3D picture of the official plaque.

On 19 March 2021, GMAA CEO Daniel Adofo told Music In Africa, “Our mission is to unite Africa through music. The scheme will also honor the hard work and dedication of various stakeholders in the music industry”. The event is composed of 30 categories.

== Notable moments ==
=== 2021: Ghana edition ===
On 23 March 2021, Gabriel Myers Hansen, a writer for Music in Africa, highlighted the ceremony. At the opening edition of GMAA, held on 20 March 2021 in Ghana. The Nigerian singer Bella Shmurda, had the highest award-winnings, with his song "Cash App", winning the Global Collaboration of the Year and Global Most Popular Song of the Year. South African musician Master KG, won Record of the Year with his song "Jerusalema". Ghanaian Singer Kuami Eugene, won Album of the Year with Son of Africa, studio album.

Nigerian singer Burna Boy won Global Artist of the Year. Tanzanian singer Nedy, won Songwriter of the Year. Ghanaian singer KiDi, won Global Male Vocalist of the Year. Nigerian DJ Cuppy won Global Female Vocalist of the Year, as Teni wins Global Female Act of the Year. According to Gabriel, "the former president of the Musicians Union of Ghana, Bice Osei Kuffour, hiplife veteran Reggie Rockstone, singer Nana Ama and Daniel Kofi Amoateng, were all presented with special recognition awards for their contribution to African music".

=== 2022: Nigeria edition ===
On 21 December 2021, the organizers opened the nomination portal, and was closed on 21 January 2022, shortly after it was recorded South African artists dominated the nominations, including the Hip Hop Artist of the Year category, dominated by South Africans, and Ghanaians, on 24 January 2022. At the second edition of GMAA, held on 16 April 2022 in Nigeria, the South African rapper Emtee won the Hip Hop Artist of the Year award. While the Nigerian musician Rema won "Afrobeat Artist of the Year".

Ghana singer Stonebwoy won 'Global Act of the Year', and his song "Greedy man", won 'Dancehall Song of the Year'. KiDi song "Touch It", won 'Record of the Year'. Album of the Year was won by the Nigerian singer Wizkid, for his fourth studio album Made in Lagos, while Naira Marley won 'Biggest Fanbase Award', while Mavin acts Ayra Starr bagged 'Female Artist of the Year', and DJ Big N won DJ of the Year. Mercy Chinwo won 'Gospel Artist of the Year', and the South African music group Mi Casa won 'Group of the Year'.

=== 2023: South Africa edition ===
On 22 May 2023, the organizers opened the nomination portal and closed on 4 June 2023, shortly after The South African revealed a multitude of South African artists dominating the nomination list.

== Award categories ==
The following are the present categories, unveiled on 21 December 2021.

=== Categorie(s) ===
- Gospel Artist of the Year
- Gospel Song of the Year
- Afrobeat Artist of the Year
- Afrobeat Song of the Year
- Dancehall Artist of the Year
- Dancehall Song of the Year
- Reggae Artist of the Year
- Collaboration of the Year
- Popular Song of the Year
- Male Vocalist of the Year
- Female Vocalist of the Year
- Male Act of the Year
- Female Act of the Year
- Songwriter of the Year
- Hip Hop Artist of the Year
- Rapper of the Year
- Album/EP of the Year
- Group of the Year
- Biggest Fanbase Award
- Best Breakthrough Act of the Year
- DJ of the Year
- Event Blogger of the Year
- Music Video Director of the Year
- Record of the Year
- Hi Life Artist of the Year
- Best International Act of the Year
- Instrumentalist of the Year
- Record Label of the Year
- Sound Engineer of the Year
- Producer of the Year
- Ghanaian Male Act of the Year
- Ghanaian Female Act of the Year
- Next Rated Ghanaian Act of the Year
- Emerging Ghanaian Act of the Year
- New Act of the Year
- Young Star of the Year
- Discovery of the Year
- Artist of the Year
