= Ekow Duker =

South African novelist

- Education: University of California, Santa Barbara (UCSB)
- Occupations: Engineer, Banker, Writer
- Writing career
- Language: English
- Notable awards: European Union Literary Award shortlisted for 2011/2012
- Website: ekowduker.com

Ekow Duker is a South African fiction author known for his works such as White Wahala. He gained attention as a finalist for the European Union Literary Award in 2011/2012. With an international education spanning Ghana, the United Kingdom, the United States, and France, Duker's diverse background has contributed to his distinctive storytelling. Beyond his writing career, he engages in corporate strategy and banking.

== Works ==
Ekow Duker self-published his first book, before being signed with Pan MacMillan.

=== Fiction ===
- White Wahala (2014)
- Dying in New York (2014)
- What will we do about Frikkie? (2015)

== Personal life ==
Ekow Duker married in 2009 and is a father to two children. In 2012, his wife, Thando Duker, died due to a liver condition. He later remarried to Bridget Duker.

Duker is a devout Christian and expresses these views in his writing.
