= Botumagyabu =

- Village
- Location in Ghana
- Coordinates: 4°56′46″N 1°44′20″W
- Country: Ghana
- Region: Western Region (Ghana)
- District: Shama District
- Time zone: GMT
  - Summer (DST): GMT
- Area code: 0322

Botumegyabu is a village in Shama District in the Western Region of Ghana near the town Sekondi. Botumegyabu is in the Essikado-Ketan constituency of the Western region of Ghana. It is mainly a dormitory village.
