= Kofi Kinaata =

Ghanaian musician

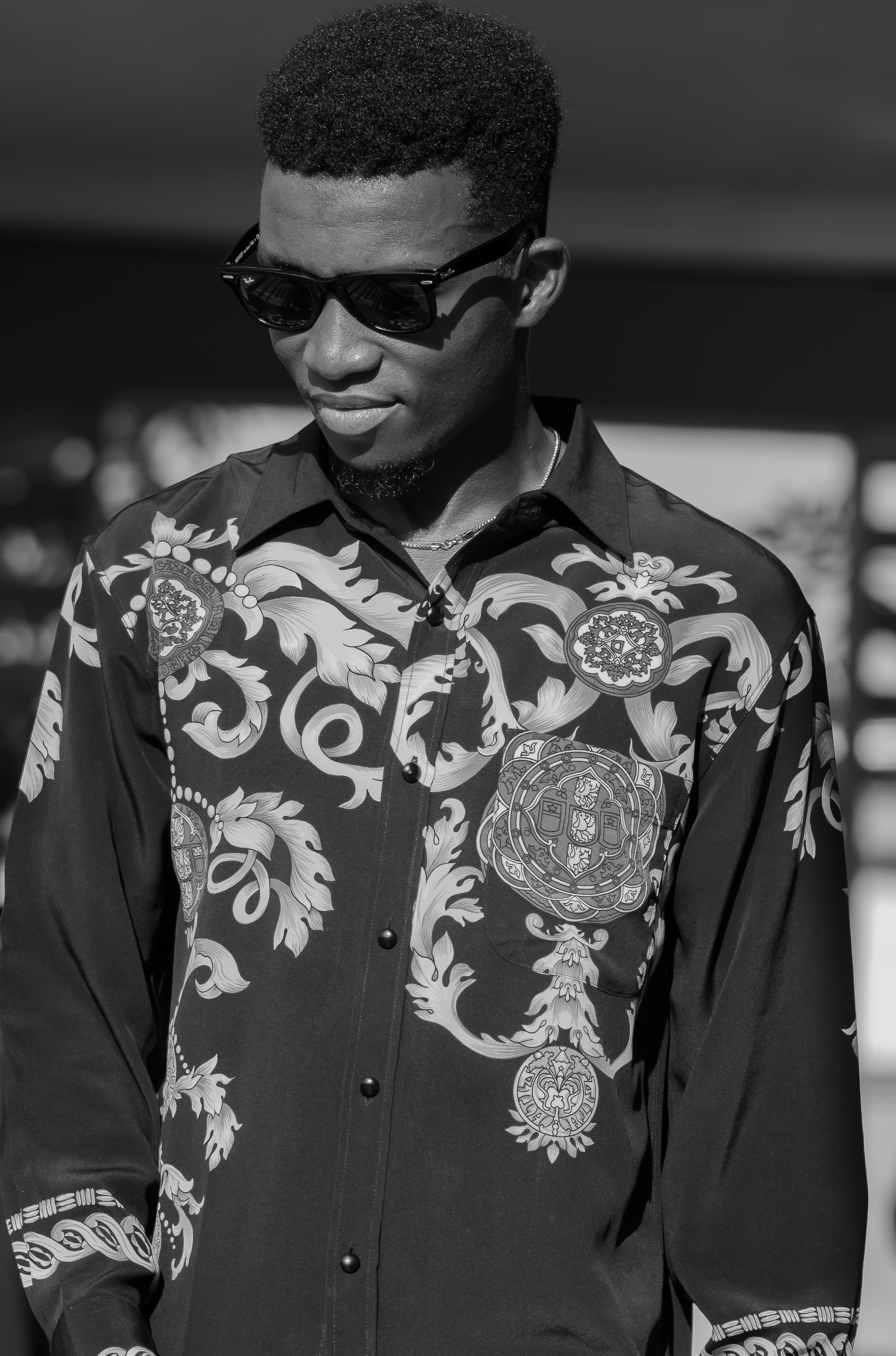
- Kofi Kinaata

Background information
- Also known as: Fante Rap God
- Born: Martin King Arthur; 15 April 1990 (age 36); Effiakuma – Takoradi, Ghana
- Genres: Highlife, Hiplife
- Occupations: Singer, rapper
- Instrument: Vocals
- Years active: (2009–present)
- Labels: Team Move Music; High Grade Family (former)
- Awards: Full list

Martin King Arthur (born 15 April 1990), popularly known as Kofi Kinaata, is a Ghanaian musician and songwriter from Takoradi. Known for his Fante rap and freestyle, he is often referred to by the moniker of Fante Rap God (FRG).

== Early life and education ==
Kofi Kinaata was born on 15 April 1990, and raised in Effiakuma, a residential town in Takoradi, in the Western Region of Ghana. He attended Nana Brempong Yaw School for his primary education and Takoradi Technical Institute for his secondary education.

== Music career ==
In 2009, Kofi Kinaata participated in the Melody FM (Kasahari) rap competition and emerged as first runner-up. He released his first single, "Obi Ne Ba" in 2011. In 2013, he became part of the High Grade Family, a music collective established by Samini, where he received mentorship and gained national prominence.

In December 2015, he released a song titled "Made in Taadi" which was praised by many Fante people due to the song's references to Ankos (a fancy dress and masquerade carnival), a festival the Fante hold every 24 December.

Kinaata is noted for his unique rhyme schemes and humorous rap style. In February 2020, Kinaata became the first artist to win the Hybrid Song of the Year Award at the Ghana Gospel Music Awards.

Kofi Kinaata has won Songwriter of the Year three times consecutively at the Ghana Music Awards. In September 2023, Kinaata performed at the Ghana Football Association (GFA) Awards.

In May 2024, Kinaata released his first EP, titled Kofi OO Kofi. The album contained seven tracks: "Auntie Ama," "Abonsam," "Saman," "Effiakuma Broken Heart ," "I don't Care," "Take Away" and "Overthinking."

=== Confession ===
Released in 2016, the song "Confession" is thought to have kick-started Kinaata's popularity. The song's lyrics were adapted by the English department of the Kwame Nkrumah University of Science and Technology for a Level 200 semester course (English Literature 263). In a final exam, the song (which is recorded in Kinaata's native Fante) was translated to English, and students were required to write a literary analysis of the lyrics.

In his last interview before he was relieved of duties as Coach of the Black Stars, Avram Grant told Bola Ray on Starr Chat that "Confession" was his favourite song.

Kinaata's "Confession" was used in 2017 as the theme song for the minority party (NDC) as a tease to the majority in parliament (NPP) to describe the state of the nation. Players of Ghana Black Stars further popularised the song by doing the "Confession dance" in goal celebrations at AFCON 2017 Tournament in Gabon.

The song received considerable playtime, helping Kinaata to win Song Writer of the Year and Best New Artist of the Year awards at the 2016 Ghana Music awards.

=== Things Fall Apart ===
Kinaata released another single, "Things Fall Apart," in 2019. The song saw streaming success across music platforms, and featured in the iTunes Ghana Top 100, Audiomack Ghana Top 20 and Boomplay AfroBeats charts for weeks. The song, produced by TwoBars, also featured on YouTube's Ghana trends with fellow celebrities such as Asamoah Gyan, Michael Essien, Kwami Sefa Kai, Phillip Osei Bonsu, Sadick Adams, KiDi, Efya, Berla Mundi, Joe Beecham rating it highly.

=== Collaborations ===
Kofi Kinaata has collaborated with other artists such as: Sarkodie, Shatta Wale, Samini, Stonebwoy, Kwesi Arthur, Jayso, Castro, Becca, Fancy Gadam, among others. His works on Odo Pa by Castro and Ghana Black Stars captain Asamoah Gyan were also widely received. Kinaata has credited Castro for being like a godfather to him, an inspiration who paved his smooth entry into Ghana's music industry. Obase Aboli, a Cameroonian musician, disclosed his interest to collaborate with Kinaata in a September 2021 interview. In March 2024, Kinaata featured on the song "Sika" by Okyeame Kwame.

=== Management ===
Samini and Tony Pun signed Kofi Kinaata to the Samini Music/ High Grade Family record label in 2013. Kofi Kinaata left the label in 2018 after his 5-year contract with management ended. Kinaata is currently an independent artist with his own label, "Team Move Music."

=== Made in Taadi concert ===
Kinaata's annual "Made in Taadi" concert is a major music event for the Western and Central Regions of Ghana. Both Kinaata's fans, and music lovers generally, have traveled from all over Ghana for this concert, which is usually held in Takoradi during Christmas. Over the years, the event has witnessed performances by acts such as: Stonebwoy, Sarkodie, Shatta Wale, Pappy Kojo, Joey B, Kwaw Kese, Medikal, KiDi, Edem. In 2019, the Made in Taadi concert was listed as one of the Top 100 Events in Ghana by Ghana Event Awards.

== Endorsements ==
Kofi Kinaata was made a brand ambassador of Good Day Energy Drink on 24 June 2021, at Lesfam in Madina, Accra. In May 2021, he was unveiled alongside Diana Hamilton as a Brand Ambassador of Enterprise Life. He is also a Goodwill ambassador for the UN's International Organization for Migration (IOM).

== Recognitions ==
=== Otumfuo Osei Tutu II ===
Kofi Kinaata received notable recognition from Asantehene Otumfuo Osei Tutu II during the General Conference of the Ghana Bar Association in Kumasi. In his speech, the Asantehene quoted the phrase "Obi nya way3" from Kinaata's hit song "Susuka" to highlight the importance of appreciating Ghana's unique identity, despite the challenges the country faces. He emphasized that many nations look up to Ghana and aspire to be like it, urging citizens to reflect on the meaningful lyrics in Kinaata's music. The Asantehene praised the wisdom found in the works of musicians like Kinaata, encouraging the public to take time to appreciate the insightful messages in their songs.

Following this recognition, Kofi Kinaata expressed his gratitude, noting that the mention by the Asantehene led to a significant increase in his social media following, streams, and overall engagement. Kinaata celebrated the recognition through several posts on social media, acknowledging the impact it had on his career. The Asantehene's commendation underscored the influence of Ghanaian music and the role of artists like Kinaata in shaping public perception and national pride.

== Videography ==
Year	Title	Director	Ref
2013	Odo Pa (as a featured artiste with Castro and Asamoah Gyan)	Nana Kofi Asihene	
2014	Oh Azaay	Prince Dovlo	
2015	Susuka	Xbills Ebenezer	
2015	The Crusade (with Donzy)	Yaw Skyface	
2016	This Year ft Samini	Prince Dovlo	
2017	Confession	Yaw Skyface	
2017	Last Show	Yaw Skyface	
2018	Single and Free	Snares	
2018	No Place Like Home	IOM Project	
2019	Illegal Fishing	Abass	
2019	Never Again ft Shatta Wale	Abass	
2019	Adam & Eve	Babs Direction	
2019	Things Fall Apart	Babs Direction	
2020	Never Again	Babs Direction	
2020	Behind The Scences	Two Bars	

== Discography ==
=== EPs ===
- 'Kofi OO Kofi' (2024)

=== Singles ===
Year	Title	Production	Ref
2014	Onnyi Chorus	Oilcity Vybez	
2014	Oh Azaay	Dr Ray	
2015	Made in Taadi	WillisBeatz	
2015	Susuka	Kin Dee	
2015	The Crusade (with Donzy)	Seshi	
2016	My Level	Kin Dee	
2016	Time No Dey	Kin Dee	
2016	Sweetie Pie	Kin Dee	
2017	Confession	Kin Dee	
2017	Last Show	WillisBeatz	
2017	Single and Free	WillisBeatz	
2017	Play	Dr Ray	
2018	Action Time	JMJ	
2018	No Place Like Home	Beatz Nation	
2018	Malafaka	Kin Dee	
2018	The Whole Show	Kin Dee	
2019	Illegal Fishing	BlaqKeyz	
2019	Never Again	Kin Dee	
2019	Adam and Eve	Shottoh Blinqx	
2019	Things Fall Apart	Two Bars	
2020	Behind The Scenes	Two Bars	
2023	Effiakuma Love	Two Bars	
2025	Aban Kaba	Seshi Dotse	
2025	It Is Finished	OTWoode	
2025	Have Mercy 2		
2026	10 over 10		
2026	For Nothing		
2026	Boot 4 Boot		
