= Effia-Kwesimintsim (Ghana parliament constituency) =

Ghana parliament constituency

Kwesimintsim
- constituency for the Parliament of Ghana
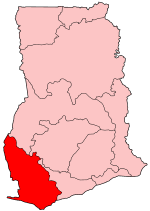
- District: Shama Ahanta East Metropolitan District
- Region: Western Region of Ghana

Current constituency
- Party: New Patriotic Party
- MP: Joseph Mensah

Joseph Mensah is the member of parliament for the constituency. He was elected on the ticket of the New Patriotic Party (NPP) and won a majority of 21,041 votes to become the MP.

== Members of parliament ==
=== 2024 Election Results ===
In the December 2024 general election, the New Patriotic Party (NPP) lost the seat to the National Democratic Congress (NDC). The incumbent, Dr. Prince Hamid Armah, was defeated by Philip Fiifi Buckman.

The final results were:

· Philip Fiifi Buckman (NDC): 15,927 votes (50.21%)

· Dr. Prince Hamid Armah (NPP): 13,317 votes (41.98%)

· Joseph Mensah (Independent): 1,835 votes

The total valid votes cast were 31,079.

=== Recent Events ===
· 2024 Candidates' Debate: Ahead of the 2024 elections, the Effia-Kwesimintsim Municipal Directorate of the National Commission for Civic Education (NCCE) organized a debate for parliamentary candidates. Mr. Philip Fiifi Buckman (NDC) and Mr. Joseph Mensah (Independent) participated, while the incumbent MP, Dr. Prince Hamid Armah (NPP), did not attend.

· Constituency Development: In September 2024, the then-MP, Dr. Prince Hamid Armah, commissioned two six-unit classroom blocks and two ultramodern kindergarten blocks for schools in the constituency. The projects were funded by the Ghana Accountability for Learning Outcomes Project (GALOP) and the Ghana Education Trust Fund (GETFund).

== See also ==
- List of Ghana Parliament constituencies
