= African Center for Economic Transformation =

- Abbreviation: ACET
- Formation: 2008
- Type: Think Tank
- Location: Accra, Ghana
- President: K.Y. Amoako
- Website: www.acetforafrica.org

The African Center for Economic Transformation (ACET) is a non-profit Accra-based think tank.

ACET economists, researchers, and support staff advise African governments—including Ghana, Liberia, Mozambique, Rwanda, and Sierra Leone—on economic matters. They produce reports and organizes meetings and conferences and other events to promote development in Africa through economic transformation (as opposed to growth). They advise on increasing FDI inflows, recommend export promotion policies and strategies, and steer education and skills development.

== History ==
ACET was founded in 2008 by K.Y. Amoako, a Ghanaian-born former United Nations Under-Secretary-General and head of the United Nations Economic Commission for Africa. Yaw Ansu became its chief economist. The organization began producing reports and providing advice and statistical information which led to the developing, negotiating, and administering of agreements between governments and petroleum and mineral companies. Shortly thereafter ACET staff published Looking East, an analysis of technology transfer opportunities created by Chinese investment in Africa.

In 2014 ACET produced and published an overall report entitled Growth with Depth: The 2014 African Transformational Report.

In 2015 the organization released the results of a study showing that Ghana's economy can be significantly strengthened through improvements in agriculture. That year its members also organized a conference, Mining Governance in Ghana.
