= Alfred Ekow Gyan =

Ghanaian politician (1964–2021)

Hon. Alfred Ekow Gyan

Deputy Minister of the Western Region
- In office 2013–2017
- President: John Dramani Mahama

Personal details
- Born: Ghana
- Party: National Democratic Congress

Alfred Ekow Gyan was a Ghanaian politician and member of Parliament for the Takoradi constituency in the Western Region of Ghana. He was a member of the National Democratic Congress of Ghana.

He died on September 1, 2021, after complications involving COVID-19
