= Effia-Kwesimintsim Municipal District =

District in Western Region of Ghana

- Municipal District
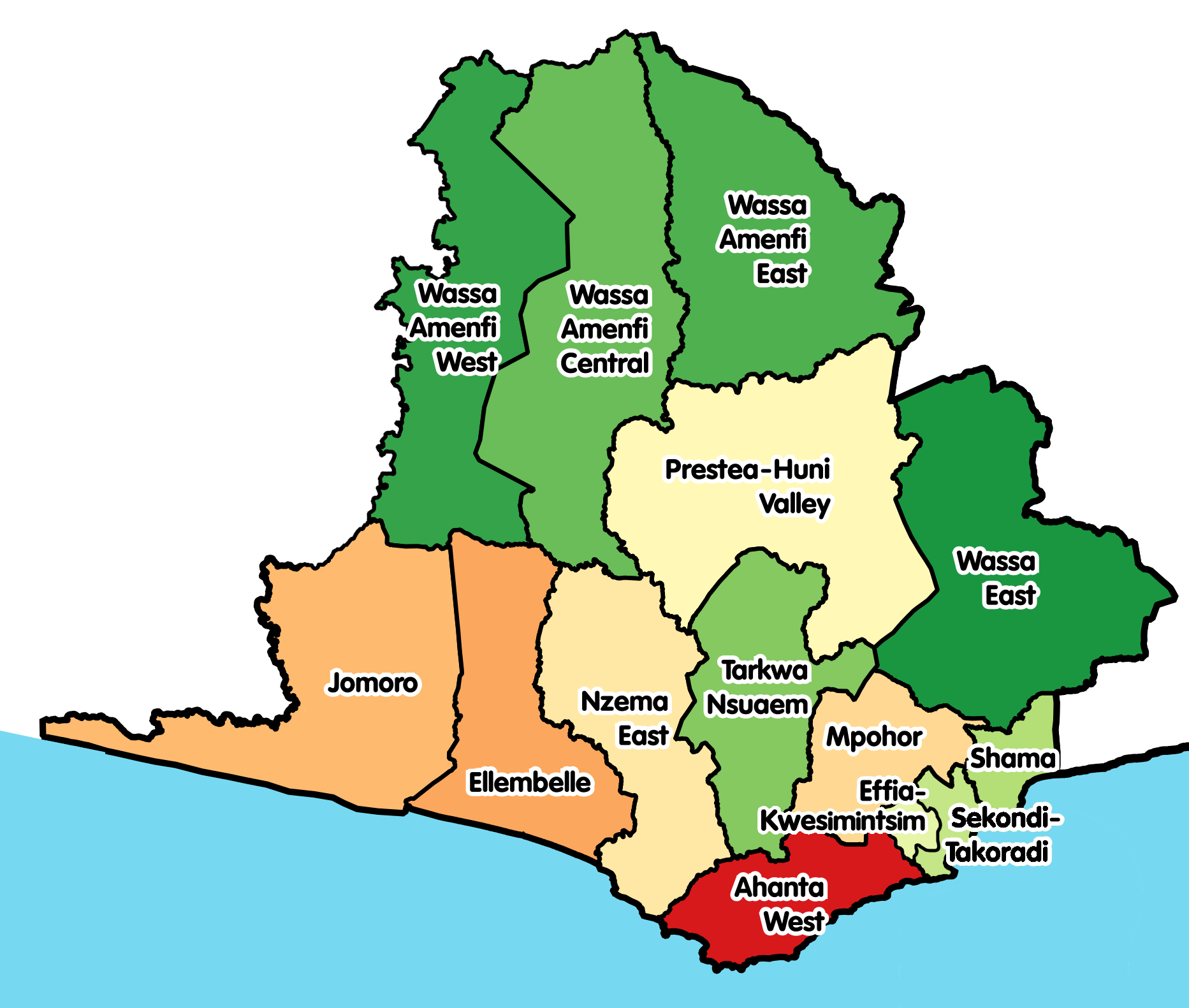
- Districts of Western Region

- Location of Effia-Kwesimintsim Municipal District within Western
- Coordinates: 4°54′52.2″N 1°47′15.36″W
- Country: Ghana
- Region: Western
- Capital: Kwesinmintsim

Area
  - Total: 50.77 km^{2} (19.60 sq mi)

Population (2021)
  - Total: 173,975
  - Density: 3,427/km^{2} (8,875/sq mi)
- Time zone: UTC+0 (GMT)
- ISO 3166 code: GH-WP-EK

Effia-Kwesimintsim Municipal District is one of the fourteen districts in Western Region, Ghana. it was formerly part of the then-larger Sekondi Takoradi Metropolitan District on 29 February 2008, until the western part of the district was split off to create Effia-Kwesimintsim Municipal District on 15 March 2018; thus the remaining part has been retained as Sekondi Takoradi Metropolitan District. The municipality is located in the southeast part of Western Region and has Kwesimintsim as its capital town.

Effia Kwesimintsim Municipal District has a Political and Administrative structure. The Political Structure is composed of the General Assembly of twenty three (23) members, comprising two (2) elected members and Seven (7) appointed members, the Metropolitan Chief Executive and two (2) Members of Parliament as members of the Assembly.

== Sources ==
- "Districts of Ghana". Statoids.
