= Anaji =

Town in Western region, Ghana

- Town
- Location in Ghana
- Coordinates: 4°54′16″N 2°6′51″W
- Country: Ghana
- Region: Western Region (Ghana)
- Elevation: 30 m (98 ft)
- Time zone: GMT
  - Summer (DST): GMT

== Introduction ==
Anaji is a town in the Western Region of Ghana. It is 10 kilometres from the centre of Takoradi, the regional capital.

== Boundaries ==
The town is bordered on the north by Namibia (a suburb of Takoradi), to the west by Kansaworodo, to the east by Nkroful and to the south by Effiakuma.

== Transportation ==
The transportation system in Anaji is feasible.

== Education ==
Some basic education schools in Anaji include the Nest School Complex and St. Peter's International School.
