= Takoradi Technical University =

Public university in Sekondi-Takoradi, Ghana

- Motto: Adwen, Akoma na Nsa ma mpuntu (Fante)
- Motto in English: "Skills combined with Wisdom accelerates development"
- Type: Public
- Established: 1954; 72 years ago
- Vice-Chancellor: Rev. Prof. Frank Eshun
- Location: Takoradi, Ghana, Africa; 4°54′34″N 1°45′22″W
- Website: http://www.ttu.edu.gh

Takoradi Technical University is a public tertiary education institution (university) located in Sekondi-Takoradi, the capital of the Western Region of Ghana. Takoradi Technical University sits in the Western Region of Ghana, where the sea breeze from the Atlantic Ocean mixes with the sound of busy classrooms and workshop machines. Takoradi Technical University was established as a government technical institute in 1954 and became part of the State Tertiary Education System.

Later, after the passage of the Polytechnic Law of 1992 (PNDCL 321), it was replaced by the Polytechnics Law (Act 745) in 2007. In 2016, the bill to convert six out of the 10 polytechnics (including Takoradi Polytechnic) into a fully fledged university received the unanimous approval of Ghanaian legislators.

== Logo ==
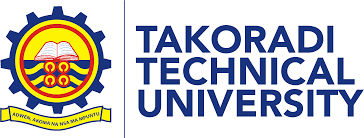
Logo of Takoradi Technical University

The university logo is intended to capture the essence of technical and vocational education. The circular nature of the logo symbolizes the completeness of the training and education nurtured at Polytechnic. The motto emblazoned around the edge reads: "Adwen, Akoma na Nsa ma mpuntu" literally "The brain (mind), heart, and hands (skills) engender development."

The interior of the logo is an open book set against a red gear against a yellow background. The interior is intended to symbolize the technical and vocational education and training provided by the university. The Adinkra symbol of "Ntesie" or "Mate masie" (literally, "I have heard and I have kept it") is a Ghanaian cultural symbol for learning, which is set on a blue background with yellow waves representing the location of the institution near the sea.

The royal blue colour that encircles the emblems in the logo represents the global appeal of education and that "the sky is the limit" for all students. The fire red colour symbolizes hard work and personal sacrifices, which drive success across all initiatives. The yellow colour encapsulates the wealth that results from the application of the skills and knowledge acquired through the education at the Takoradi Polytechnic.

== History ==
The Takoradi Technical University was established in September, 2016 as a result of the government's policy to convert Takoradi Polytechnic, among five other polytechnics, to the status of Technical University. In effect, since April 1954, Takoradi Technical University (formerly Takoradi Polytechnic) has existed as a government technical institute under the Ghana Education Service of the Ministry of Education. During that period, the institute offered programmes mainly at the Craft and Technician Certificate levels in commercial and technical subjects, awarding the Royal Society of Arts (RSA) and City and Guilds of London, United Kingdom. However, in 1990, the Ghana Education Service took over the awarding of the above-mentioned certificates.

As part of the Ghana Educational Reforms, which began in the 1980s, the Takoradi Technical Institute and five other similar institutions were upgraded by the Polytechnic Act 321 (PNDC Law 1993) to become part of the Ghana Tertiary Education System. The Polytechnics, per the law, began to offer Higher National Diploma (HND) programmers in the 1993/1994 academic year. These reforms mandated that the polytechnics complement the role of the universities to increase access to tertiary education for the training of middle- and higher-level manpower.

A bill proposed by the Ministry of Education and considered by the Cabinet of Government in 2014 was passed by Parliament as an Act in August 2016 with the assent of the President, converting some polytechnics into full-fledged technical universities. In view of that, the Takoradi Polytechnic Council adopted the name "Takoradi Technical University", which has been duly registered with the Registrar General's Department of Ghana. Currently, Takoradi Technical University has three (3) campuses: Effia Kuma (Takoradi), Butumagyebu (Sekondi), and Akatakyi (Agona-Nkwanta). The Akatakyi Campus is the largest of the three, with an acreage of 152.3.

== Corporate Partnerships ==
=== TTE Technical Training Group ===
The TTE Technical Training Group, a UK technical training school in the oil and gas industries, announced a major partnership in Ghana with Tullow Oil to establish a new training centre aimed at equipping local technicians for work in the oil, gas, manufacturing, and mining industries. The Minister of Education, Professor Jane Naana Poku-Agyemang commissioned a $6 million Technical Training Centre in Takoradi Polytechnic to train Ghanaian students in these fields on 21 June 2013. The centre, named "Jubilee Technical Training Centre", was co-sponsored by the Oil Jubilee Partners, Tullow Ghana Limited, Anadarko WCTP Company, Kosmos Energy, Ghana National Petroleum Company, and Sabre Oil/Gas Holding Limited. The centre is the first in West Africa to offer diploma-accredited qualifications to support industry and commerce in Ghana.

=== Accra Brewery Limited ===
As part of an effort to provide practical training for undergraduates as well as an effort to improve the institution's business relationships, Accra Brewery Limited signed a Memorandum of Understanding (MOU) with Takoradi Polytechnic. The MOU, which covers a four-year period, allows students to learn at the brewery.

== Awards and achievements ==
=== National SLB PetroChallenge 2024 ===
Takoradi Technical University (TTU) emerged as the winner of the 2024 National SLB PetroChallenge competition held in Accra, Ghana. The competition featured ten universities, including the University of Ghana, University of Mines and Technology (UMaT), Kwame Nkrumah University of Science and Technology (KNUST), and the University of Cape Coast. The TTU team, comprising Solomon Ayissah, David Nana Doffour Mensah, and Jacob Kwabena Amoeku from the Oil and Natural Gas Engineering Department, displayed exceptional skills to claim victory.

The team received six-month internships with SLB (Schlumberger), certificates of honour, a plaque, and Samsung tablets for their achievement. The event tested participants' knowledge of the oil and gas sector. TTU's Vice-Chancellor, Rev. Prof. John Frank Eshun, commended the team for bringing recognition to the university. He noted that the achievement affirmed TTU's leadership in petroleum education and training.

=== Best Regional Polytechnic ===
Takoradi Polytechnic was nominated as the Best Regional Polytechnic in Science and Education by the Europe Business Assembly (EBA), a vanity award. In a statement signed by EBA International Relations Manager Anna Gorobets, the award recognises the Polytechnic Institutes professionalism in teaching and learning, the quality of its researchers, the introduction and realization of international programmes, and the institution's contributions to national educational development. The statement added that the Rector of the Polytechnic will be presented with an award for the 'Best Manager of the Year' in the science and education field.

=== Best in Examination Ethics ===
In 2012, Takoradi Polytechnic was recognized by the Exam Ethics Marshals International (EEMI) as the best institution in examination ethics in Ghana. The Rector, Reverend Professor Daniel Agyapong Nyarko, was also honored as an Exam Ethics Master Marshal for his efforts in promoting transparency and integrity in examination practices.

=== Ranking ===
Takoradi Polytechnic was ranked the first among polytechnics in Ghana for the second time running by the world universities ranking body, Webomatics, the largest public research body known for its scientific methods in web ranking. The Polytechnic maintained its 2012 first position among polytechnics in Ghana and placed third in Sub-Saharan Africa, coming after Auchi Polytechnic and Yaba College of Technology.

== 70th Anniversary ==
Takoradi Technical University (TTU) launched its 70th Anniversary celebrations on April 18, 2024, marking seven decades of contributions to technical education. The event included the unveiling of an official logo, designed by alumnus Prince Asamoah Williams, symbolizing the university's growth, innovation, and societal impact. The Vice-Chancellor, Rev. Prof. John Frank Eshun, highlighted the institution's achievements and future aspirations, emphasizing unity as a key factor in its progress.

Dr. Dominic Kwesi Eduah, executive director of GNPC Foundation and a TTU alumnus, donated a laptop to the best graduating disability student and contributed funds to support the celebrations. The President of the TTU Alumni Association, Dr. Bruce Amartey, commended the university's achievements and its role in advancing technical education in Ghana.

== See also ==
- List of universities in Ghana
- Education in Ghana
