= Anko =

Anko may refer to:

== People ==
- Emperor Ankō (安康天皇; reigned c. 453-456), Japanese emperor
- Ankō Asato (安里 安恒; 1827–1906), karate master and contemporary of Itosu
- Ankō Itosu (糸洲 安恒; 1831–1915), father of modern karate
- Mabuni Ankō (摩文仁 安恒), a bureaucrat of the Ryukyu Kingdom.
- Majikina Ankō (真境名 安興, 1875-1933), Japanese scholar
- Anko van der Werff, (born 1975) Dutch lawyer and business executive
- Ankopaaingyadete (Anko), 19th-century Kiowa calendar artist

== Fictional characters ==
- Anko Mitarashi (みたらしアンコ), in the Naruto series
- Anko Uehara (上原 杏子), in the manga/anime Great Teacher Onizuka
- Anko Kitashirakawa (北白川 あんこ), in the anime Tamako Market
- Anko Koshi (虎視 餡子) / Koshian (こしあん), in the manga/anime My Deer Friend Nokotan
- King Anko, a sea serpent in the children's fantasy novel The Sea Fairies (1911) by L. Frank Baum
- Anko Uguisu, a private detective in the manga/anime Call of the Night

== Other ==
- Ankos Festival, an annual event celebrated
- Anglerfish, in Japanese
- Red bean paste, called Anko (餡こ or 小豆)) in Japanese
- Anko, in-house brand name of retail chain Kmart in Australia and New Zealand, and Zellers in Canada
