= Sekondi-Takoradi =

City in Western Region, Ghana

- City
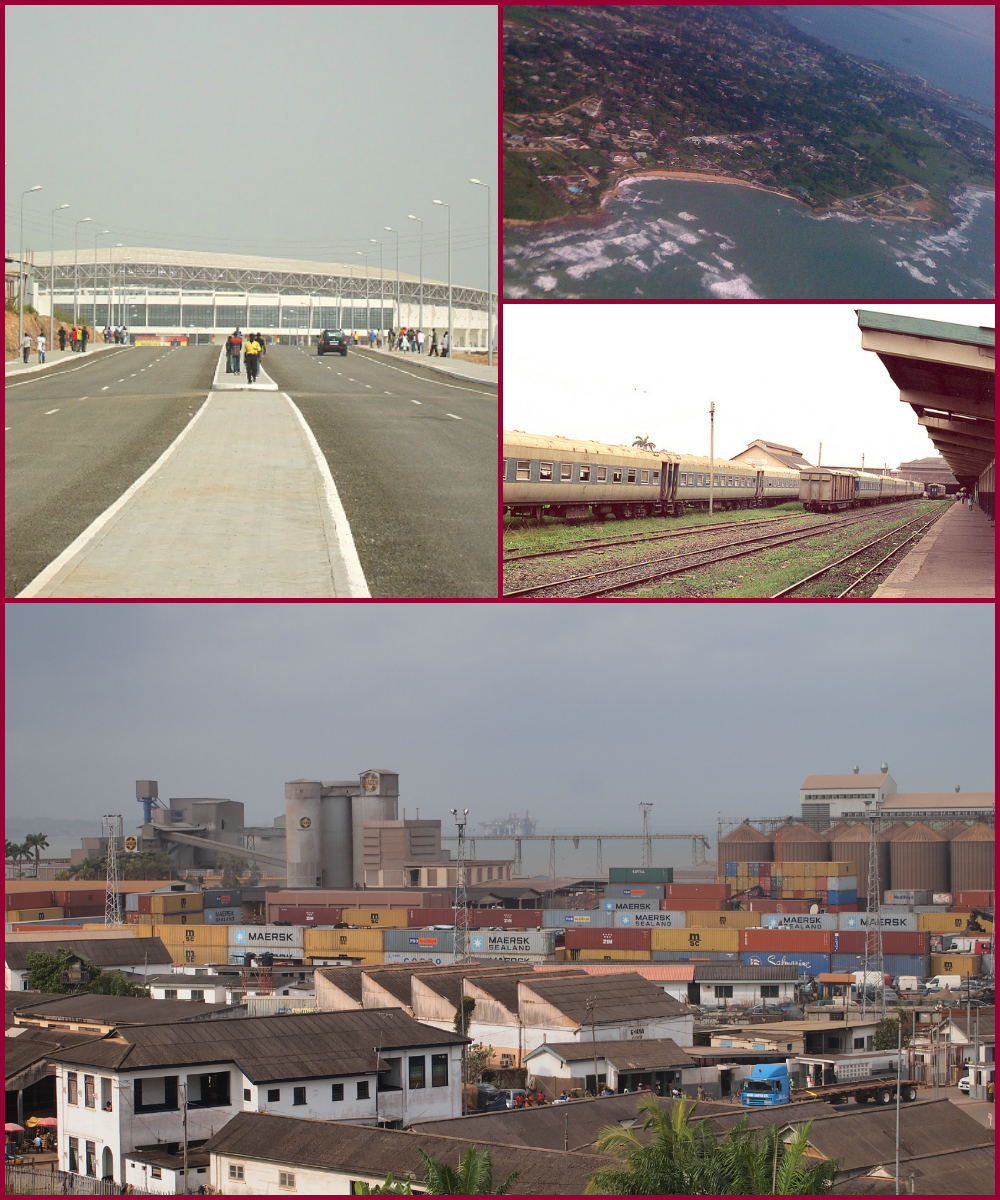
- Top left picture: Arterial road and highway with the Sekondi-Takoradi Stadium, First top right picture: Shoreline of Sekondi-Takoradi, Second top right picture: Railway station of Sekondi-Takoradi, Bottom picture: Sekondi-Takoradi harbour with intermodal containers and private housing estates.
- Etymology: Sekondi is derived from the word second while the name Takoradi is derived either from Ahanta expression Takora-adi (under the takore tree) or an amalgamation of Ntakorase (under the ntakor tree) and the Portuguese name for the settlement, taccarada)
- Nickname: Oil City
- Location of Sekondi-Takoradi in Western Region, Ghana Sekondi-Takoradi (Africa)
- Coordinates: 04°55′00″N 01°46′00″W
- Country: Ghana
- Region: Western Region
- District: Sekondi Takoradi Metropolitan
- Merged: 1946

Government
  - Type: Mayor-Council
  - Municipal chief: Lawyer Frederick F. Faidoo
- Elevation: 10 m (33 ft)

Population (2021)
  - Total: 104,847
  - Ethnicities: Ahanta; Fante; Nzema; Wassa
  - Religions: Christianity; Islam; traditional African religions
- Time zone: UTC+0 (GMT)
- Postal codes: WS000-WS792
- Area code: 031
- Climate: Aw
- Website: stma.gov.gh

Sekondi-Takoradi (/səˈkənˈdɪ tɑːˈkəˈrɑːˈdi/ seh-kon-DEE tar-ku-wh-DEE) is a city in Ghana comprising the twin cities of Sekondi and Takoradi. It is the capital of Sekondi-Takoradi Metropolitan District and the Western Region of Ghana. Sekondi-Takoradi is the region's largest city as well as an industrial and commercial center, with a population of 245,382 people, according to the 2021 census. Since 2025 the mayor of the city and the metropolitan area has been Frederick F. Faidoo, a lawyer. Kwabena Okyere Darko-Mensah is the current member of parliament for Takoradi and Armah Blay Nyameke for Sekondi.

Both cities developed from Dutch and English forts built around the 17th century in the early colonial and trading period. After a railway and a deepwater seaport was built in Sekondi and Takoradi in 1903 and 1928, both cities became important economic sectors in Ghana. They merged in 1946.

Leading industries in the city are timber, cocoa processing, plywood, shipbuilding, its harbour and railway repair, and recently, sweet crude oil and crude oil. The most common occupation in Sekondi-Takoradi is fishing. Sekondi-Takoradi lies on the main railway lines to Kumasi.

== History ==
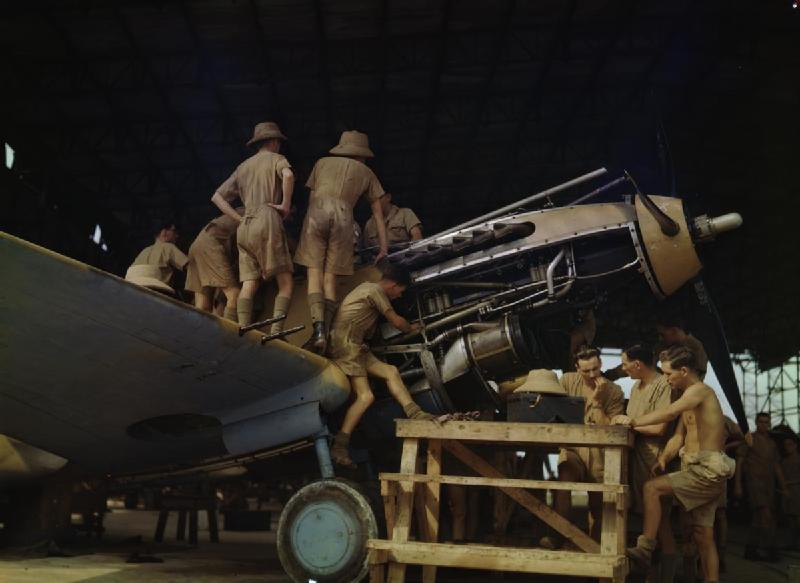
The Desert Air Force, 1943; Royal Air Force (RAF) airmen in tropical dress work on the Allison V-1710 Aircraft engine of a Tomahawk aircraft in a makeshift hangar. The photograph is believed to have been taken at RAF Takoradi.

=== Etymology ===
Sekondi is derived from the word second, after the settlement was chosen as the second location for a shallow water harbour. The name was previously spelled Secondee, and for Fort Sekondi, on the site of the city, the variant Zakonde was also used. There is not a consensus about the derivation of "Takoradi", there are at least two accounts. One accounts says it is an amalgamation of the local name Ntakorase, meaning under the ntakor tree and the Portuguese word for the slave post, "Taccarada", which merged into Takoradi through the versions Tacorrasi and Takoradze as the respective populations had trouble pronouncing the names. Before the arrival of the Portuguese, the city was also referred to as Amanfulkro (town of Amanful), a name that is still in limited use. According to another account, the name developed from the Ahanta expression Takora-adi (under the takore-dua (takore tree)). In some of the other Akan languages, there exist other versions - in Fante - Takora-adzi; in some of the Twi dialects it is Takora-asi. These versions are found as settlement names in other parts of the country - one close to Ataabadzi and one close to Akyem/in the region of the former Akyem and Kade, Ghana etc. The tree in question in both accounts is nowadays extinct.

=== Early settlement ===
Sekondi, the older and larger of the two towns, was the site of Fort Orange, Fort Witsen, and Fort Sekondi, all built in the 17th century by the Dutch. During this time, both the British and Dutch traders had such powerful influence in the town that effectively there were two corresponding political divisions: “British Sekondi” and "Dutch Sekondi”. Both European settlements essentially collapsed after the Dutch formally left in 1872.

The town prospered from a railroad built in 1903 to transport mineral and timber resources from the hinterland to the coast. In 1928, Ghana's first deepwater seaport was built in Takoradi.

==== World War II ====
During World War II, RAF Takoradi was an important staging point for British aircraft destined for Egypt. Spitfire fighter planes were shipped in crates from England to Takoradi, where they were assembled and flown via Nigeria and Sudan to Libya. 26 Squadron SAAF was also based in Takoradi during the conflict, flying anti-submarine and convoy protection patrols over the Atlantic. Some South African airmen are buried in the Takoradi European Public cemetery.

=== 20th century to present ===
The two cities amalgamated after the war, on 2 December 1946. On 20 November 1969, the city became the seat of the Roman Catholic Diocese of Sekondi–Takoradi.

== Economy ==
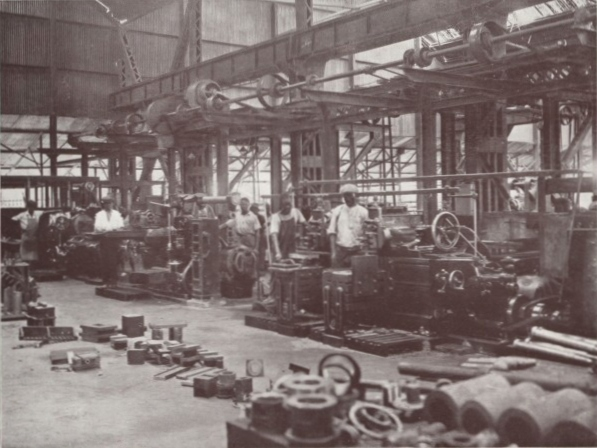
Mechanics in a railway station at Sekondi

The city is an important commercial center in Ghana with an industrialized economy. Its location on the coast makes it an essential hub for fishing and trading activities. The Albert Bosomtwi-Sam Fishing Harbour, located in Sekondi. It is one of the largest fishing ports in the region. Historically it was a center for the timber and cocoa industries as these resources were transported into the city for export. The Takoradi Harbour and the Takoradi Market Circle are also an important sector in the city's economy. The discovery of oil in the region in 2010 have resulted in Sekondi-Takoradi to be known as the "Oil City".

== Administration ==
The city has a mayor–council form of government. The mayor (executive chief) is appointed by the president of Ghana and approved by the town council, the Sekondi Takoradi Metropolitan Assembly. The current mayor as of 2021 is Abdul-Mumin Issah.

== Demographics ==
Historical population
Year	Pop.	±%
1970	143,982	—
1984	188,203	+30.7%
2000	260,651	+38.5%
2010	167,713	−35.7%
2021	104,837	−37.5%
Source: Ghana Statistical Service. (Note: Sources: 2000 census, 2010 census, 2021 census)

The population of Sekondi-Takoradi is 245,382 people, a -37.5% difference from the last census. Almost all of Sekondi-Takoradi's population is Christian, out of which 34.7% are Pentecostal/Charismatic, 25.6% are Protestant, and 14.3% are Catholic with the remaining 11.8% comprising numerous minor denominations. About 9% of the population is Muslim, 3.5% identifies as non-religious and 0.2% practices traditional African religions while the remaining 0.6% practices other religions. The major peoples found in the city are the Fante followed by the Ahanta, Nzema, Asante and Wassa people.

== Geography ==
=== Metropolitan area ===
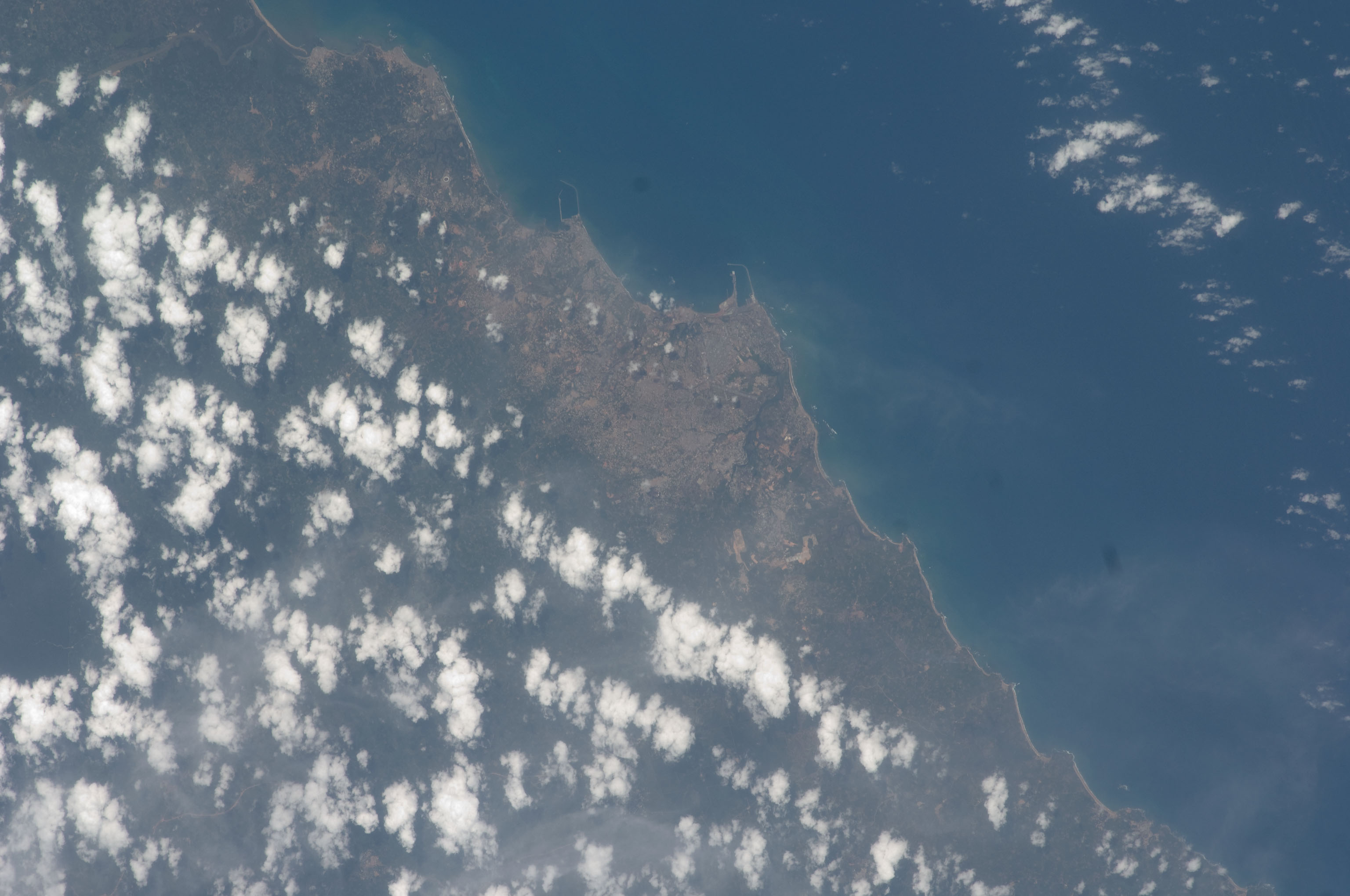
View of Sekondi Takoradi Metropolitan taken during ISS Expedition 18

Sekondi-Takoradi is located in the Sekondi Takoradi Metropolitan, which covers a land area of 191.7 km^{2} (74.0 sq mi). The metropolitan borders the Ahanta West District to the west, the Shama District to the east, the Wassa East District to the north and the Gulf of Guinea to the south.

=== Climate ===
Sekondi-Takoradi has a tropical savanna climate (Köppen climate classification: Aw), where it experiences a wet and dry season and the temperature being hot year-round. The average annual high is 28 °C (82 °F) while the average annual low is 22.2 °C (72.0 °F). The hottest time of year is from January to May, around the time the wet season begins.

The city receives a total amount of 126 mm (5.0 in) of rainfall throughout the year, with a distinct wet and dry season. The dry season is short, spanning from December to March while the wet season is between May and June. June, the wettest month, receives on average 346 mm (13.6 in). The relative humidity in the city is small and also erratic at times due to influence of sea and land breezes. The highest humidity is experienced in August after the rainy season and is the lowest in December.

==== Flooding ====
Based on a 2017 study, Sekondi-Takoradi and the metro as a whole is prone to flooding due to its proximity to the Anankwari, Kansawura and Whin rivers. In 2009 and 2011, more than 1,000 people were rendered homeless after heavy rainfall caused the rivers to overflow their banks to the neighbouring communities.

Climate data for Sekondi-Takoradi
Month	Jan	Feb	Mar	Apr	May	Jun	Jul	Aug	Sep	Oct	Nov	Dec	Year
Record high °C (°F)	35.0 (95.0)	35.5 (95.9)	35.0 (95.0)	34.6 (94.3)	34.6 (94.3)	32.3 (90.1)	31.8 (89.2)	30.4 (86.7)	31.2 (88.2)	32.0 (89.6)	34.5 (94.1)	34.2 (93.6)	35.5 (95.9)
Mean daily maximum °C (°F)	30.4 (86.7)	31.0 (87.8)	31.3 (88.3)	31.1 (88.0)	30.2 (86.4)	28.4 (83.1)	27.3 (81.1)	26.8 (80.2)	27.6 (81.7)	28.8 (83.8)	30.0 (86.0)	30.3 (86.5)	29.4 (84.9)
Daily mean °C (°F)	26.2 (79.2)	26.9 (80.4)	27.2 (81.0)	27.2 (81.0)	26.7 (80.1)	25.6 (78.1)	24.8 (76.6)	24.1 (75.4)	24.6 (76.3)	25.5 (77.9)	26.2 (79.2)	26.2 (79.2)	26.0 (78.8)
Mean daily minimum °C (°F)	21.8 (71.2)	22.6 (72.7)	23.1 (73.6)	23.2 (73.8)	23.1 (73.6)	22.8 (73.0)	21.8 (71.2)	21.1 (70.0)	21.7 (71.1)	22.1 (71.8)	22.2 (72.0)	22.1 (71.8)	22.3 (72.1)
Record low °C (°F)	16.1 (61.0)	18.3 (64.9)	20.6 (69.1)	20.6 (69.1)	20.0 (68.0)	19.4 (66.9)	17.2 (63.0)	16.1 (61.0)	17.8 (64.0)	18.9 (66.0)	18.9 (66.0)	16.1 (61.0)	16.1 (61.0)
Average rainfall mm (inches)	31 (1.2)	35 (1.4)	79 (3.1)	115 (4.5)	250 (9.8)	346 (13.6)	120 (4.7)	43 (1.7)	57 (2.2)	138 (5.4)	77 (3.0)	31 (1.2)	1,322 (51.8)
Average rainy days (≥ 0.3 mm)	3	4	7	10	17	19	13	11	13	14	10	5	126
Average relative humidity (%)	86	85	83	84	84	86	87	87	87	87	86	85	86
Mean monthly sunshine hours	207.7	209.1	229.4	216.0	192.2	132.0	148.8	133.3	126.0	195.3	243.0	229.4	2,262.2
Mean daily sunshine hours	6.7	7.4	7.4	7.2	6.2	4.4	4.8	4.3	4.2	6.3	8.1	7.4	6.2
Source: Deutscher Wetterdienst

== Transportation ==
Modes of transportation in Sekondi-Takoradi
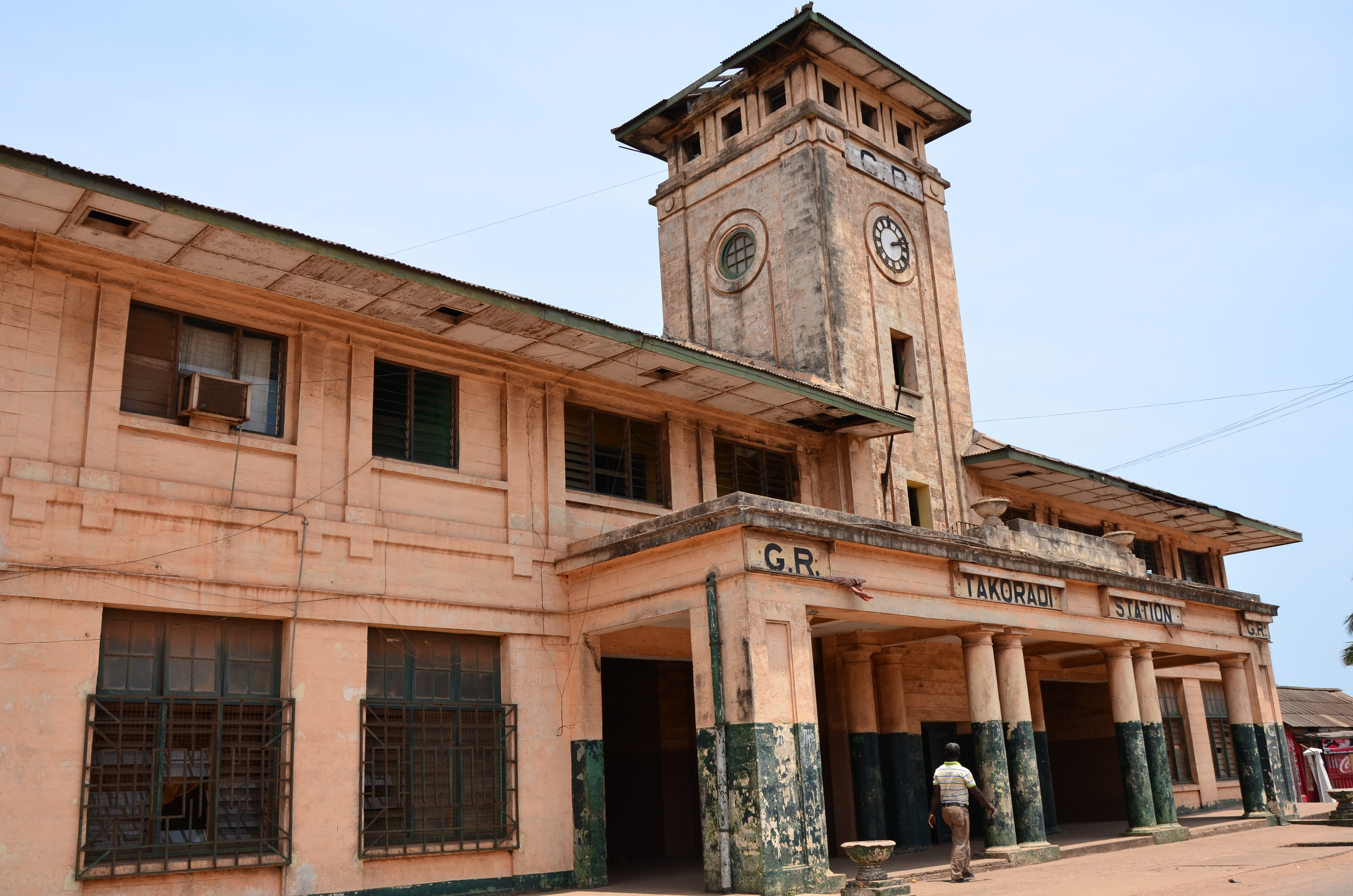
Takoradi railway station

Takoradi Airport

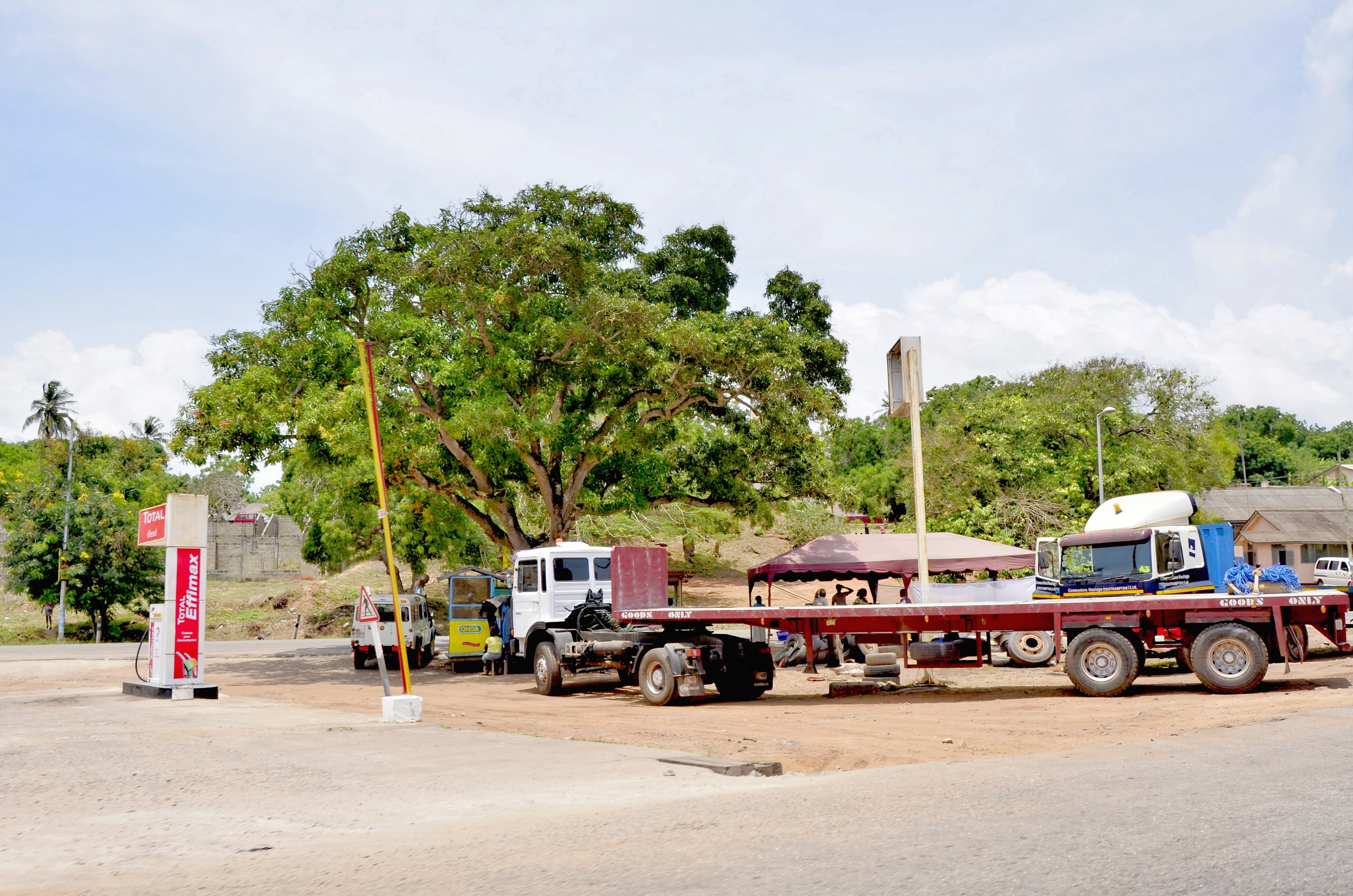
Trucks at a refilling station in Sekondi-Takoradi

Sekondi is well-connected to other parts of Ghana and neighboring countries through a network of roads and railways. The city's port is a vital transportation hub, with several shipping lines providing regular services to other West African countries and Europe. The Takoradi Airport (TDI), located about 5 km from Sekondi, provides air transportation to other parts of Ghana and international destinations. There are public transport connections from Takoradi to major cities, such as Accra, Kumasi, Mim, Cape Coast, Sunyani, Tamale, Tema, Ho, Wa, Bolgatanga, Elubo, Aflao, and Techiman.

== Culture ==
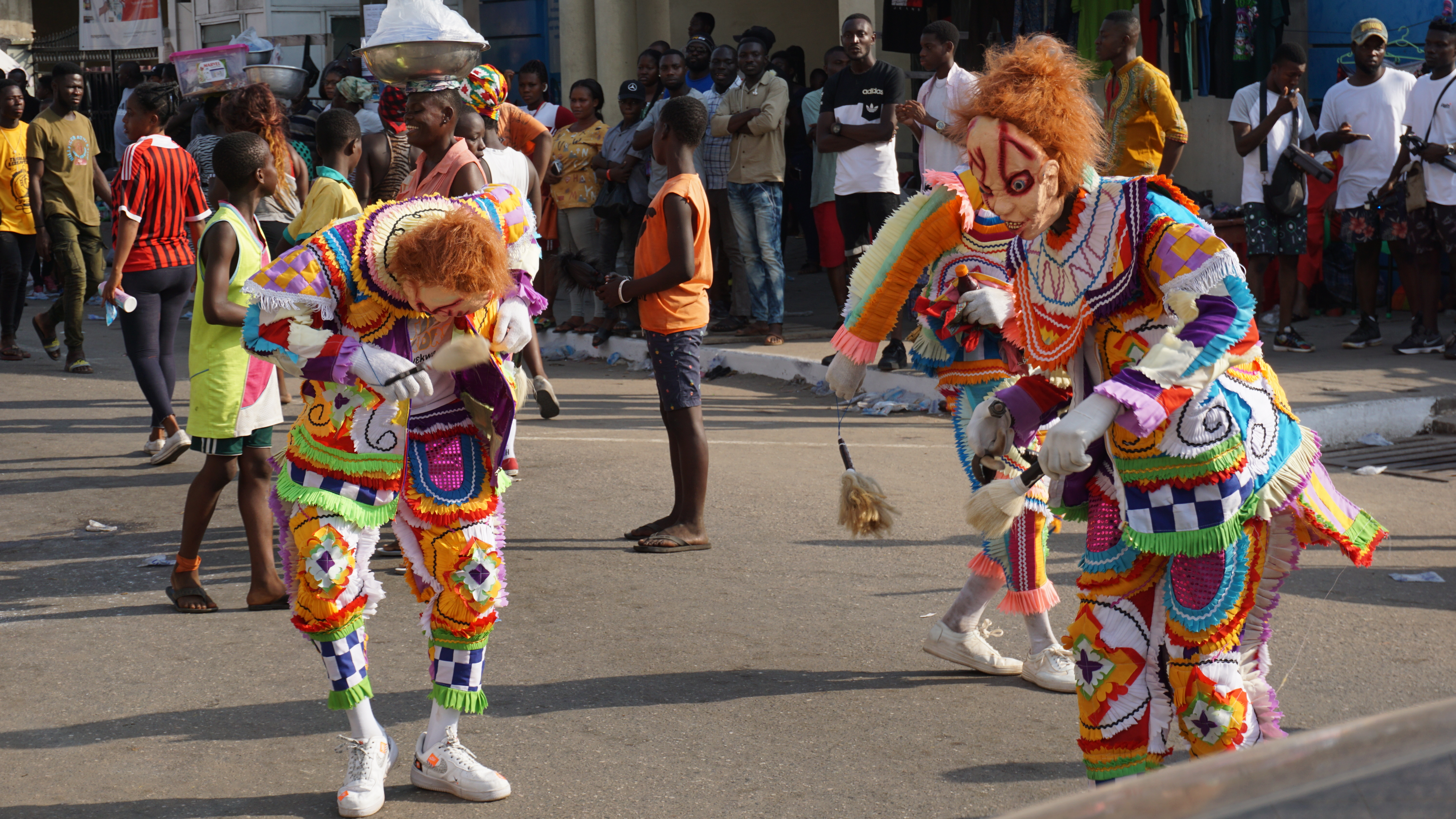
Masquerades Dancing in Takoradi during the Ankos Festival

Sekondi-Takoradi has a rich cultural heritage, and the city is home to several landmarks and tourist attractions. Fort Sekondi and the local railway museum are some notable structures originated from the colonial era. The city also have notable nightlife, with several pubs, restaurants and clubs popping out all across the city. Many annual festivals are celebrated in the city, including the Ankos Festival and the Kundum Festival.

== Healthcare ==
On 5 June 2024, Kwabena Okyere Darko-Mensah, the Western Regional Minister, commissioned a 60-bed polyclinic in New Takoradi, an upgrade from the original facility which was a Community-based Health Planning and Services (CHPS) program compound. (Note: CHPS hospitals are a national technique to help provide essential health services to communities who lack access to proper health care.)

== Education ==
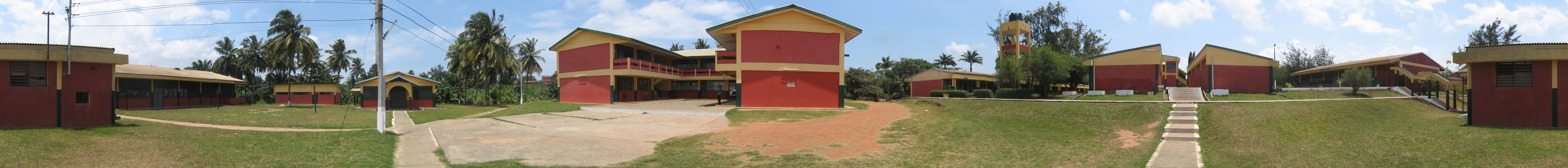
Panorama view of Takoradi Technical University campus center

The city has several secondary schools, colleges, and special schools. This is a list of senior high schools, colleges, and universities in the city:

Senior High Schools

- St. John's School
- Ghana Senior High Technical School
- Baidoo Bonsoe Senior High Technical School
- St. Mary's Boys' Senior High School
- Methodist senior high school
- Ahantaman Senior High School
- Fijai Secondary School
- Adiembra Secondary School
- Bompeh Senior High Technical School
- Archbishop Porter Girls Secondary School

Colleges/Universities

- Takoradi Technical University
- Nurses and Midwifery Training College
- Holy Child Teachers Training College
- Sekondi College

Takoradi Technical Institute houses a fab lab, equipped by the Massachusetts Institute of Technology (MIT), which is the first of its kind in Africa. The Western Regional Library was established in Sekondi in 1955.

== Sports ==
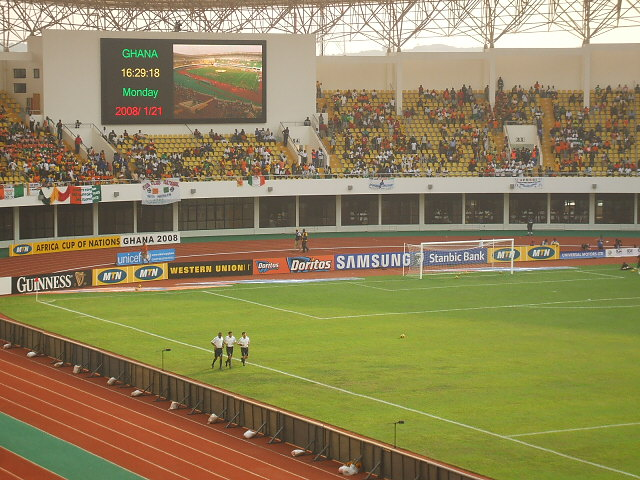
Interior design of Sekondi-Takoradi Stadium (2008)

Sekondi-Takoradi is home to two stadiums, Essipong Stadium and Gyandu Park. Notable sports teams based in the city are FC Takoradi, Sekondi Hasaacas, and Sekondi Wise Fighters.

== Media ==
As many as 114 internet service providers operate in the city, along with over 150 FM radio stations and 20 TV stations in the city. All of these services help with inter-communication around the residents.

== Sister cities ==
The following shows the cities Sekondi-Takoradi is twined with:

Country	City	County / district / region / state	Date (Note: Numbers in date column list the year of twinning)	Ref.
Italy	Palermo	Sicily	2021	
USA	Boston	Suffolk, Massachusetts	2001	
USA	Oakland	Alameda county, California	1975	

== Notable people ==
- Gyedu-Blay Ambolley, musician
- Ben Bentil (born 1995), basketball player for Hapoel Tel Aviv of the Israeli Basketball Premier League
- Esther Cobbah, communication specialist
- Joseph Henry Smith, ambassador of Ghana to the United States
- Mokowa Blay Adu-Gyamfi, former Ghanaian diplomat, current presidential advisor on HIV/AIDS at the Office of the President of Ghana
- Shasha Marley, musician
- Kiki Gyan, musician

== See also ==
- Takoradi Harbour
- List of railway stations in Ghana
- Bombei Festival
