= Sekondi Nurses and Midwifery Training College =

The Sekondi Nurses Training College is public tertiary health institution in the Sekondi in the Western Region of Ghana. The college is in the Sekondi Takoradi Metropolitan Assembly. The school is located at the Effia-Nkwanta Regional Hospital. The activities of the institution is supervised by the Ministry of Education. The University of Ghana awards a Diploma in Nursing after students from the institution have successfully completed a three-year nursing training programme. The institution is accredited by the National Accreditation Board. The Nurses and Midwifery Council is the regulates the activities, curriculum and examination of the. The council's mandate Is enshrined under section 4(1) of N.R.C.D. 117.
