= Fort Sekondi =

Fort in Ghana

- Part of British Gold Coast
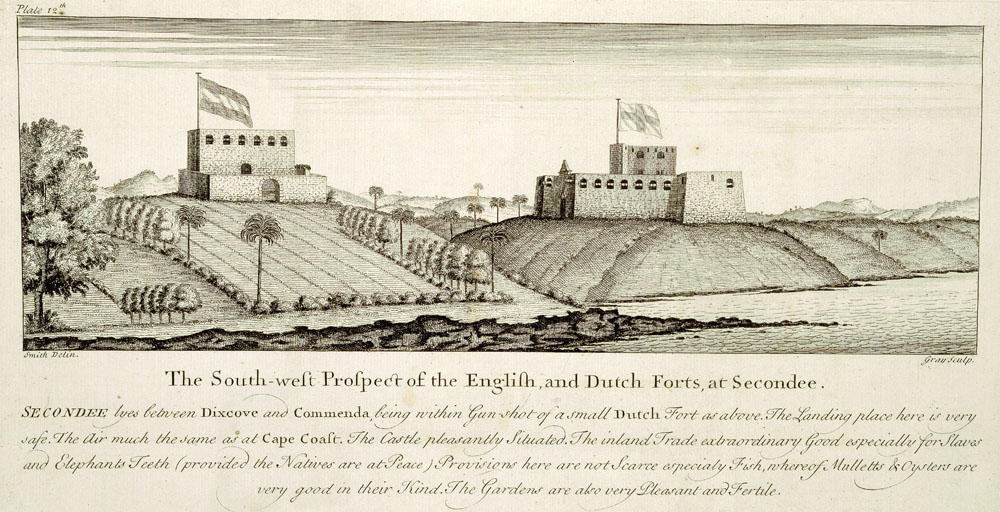
- Fort Orange (left) and Fort Sekondi (right)

Location
- Coordinates: 4.9415°N 1.7095°W

Site history
- Built: 1682

Garrison information
- Occupants: Britain (1682–1868); Netherlands (1868–1872)

Fort Sekondi, also Fort George, was an English fort on the Gold Coast (now Ghana), built in 1682 at Sekondi (earlier Zakonde and Secondee). It was close to the Dutch Fort Orange, which had been built in 1642. This first English building was small, according to William Claridge: "[...] at Sekondi [...] Captain Henry Nurse, Agent for the English (Royal African) Company, also built a fort there a few years later. Both these buildings were of about the same size and only a gun-shot apart". He said, "The Dutch Fort Orange was a very small place, being merely a square white house in a yard, mounting eight or ten guns on a terrace on the roof. The first English fort had been a very similar building [...]".

This English fort was destroyed on 1 June 1698, during the Dutch-Komenda war, and reduced to blackened outer walls. Although denied by the Dutch, reports and letters sent at the time indicated that the Dutch instigated the attack and that some plundered goods were taken from the English site to their Castle Orange next-door. The English made some attempts to rebuild their fort in 1700, but abandoned their effort because of hostility from the indigenous population.

A new second fort had been built before 1726 as it was drawn by William Smith (see picture top right), an African Company surveyor, and a floor plan given. In 1782 the fort was taken by the Dutch and destroyed. According to Claridge: "The only success scored by the Dutch during this war was the capture of the English fort at Sekondi, which they completely destroyed."

Though later transfers occurred, the fort was not rebuilt. It was transferred to the Dutch in 1868 as part of the Anglo-Dutch Gold Coast Treaty, a large trade of forts between Britain and the Netherlands. On 10 April 1872 the fort was transferred back to the United Kingdom as part of the Anglo-Dutch Treaties of 1870–1871.
