= Fort Orange, Ghana =

Fort Orange
- Fort Oranje
- Sekondi, Western Region, Ghana in Ghana
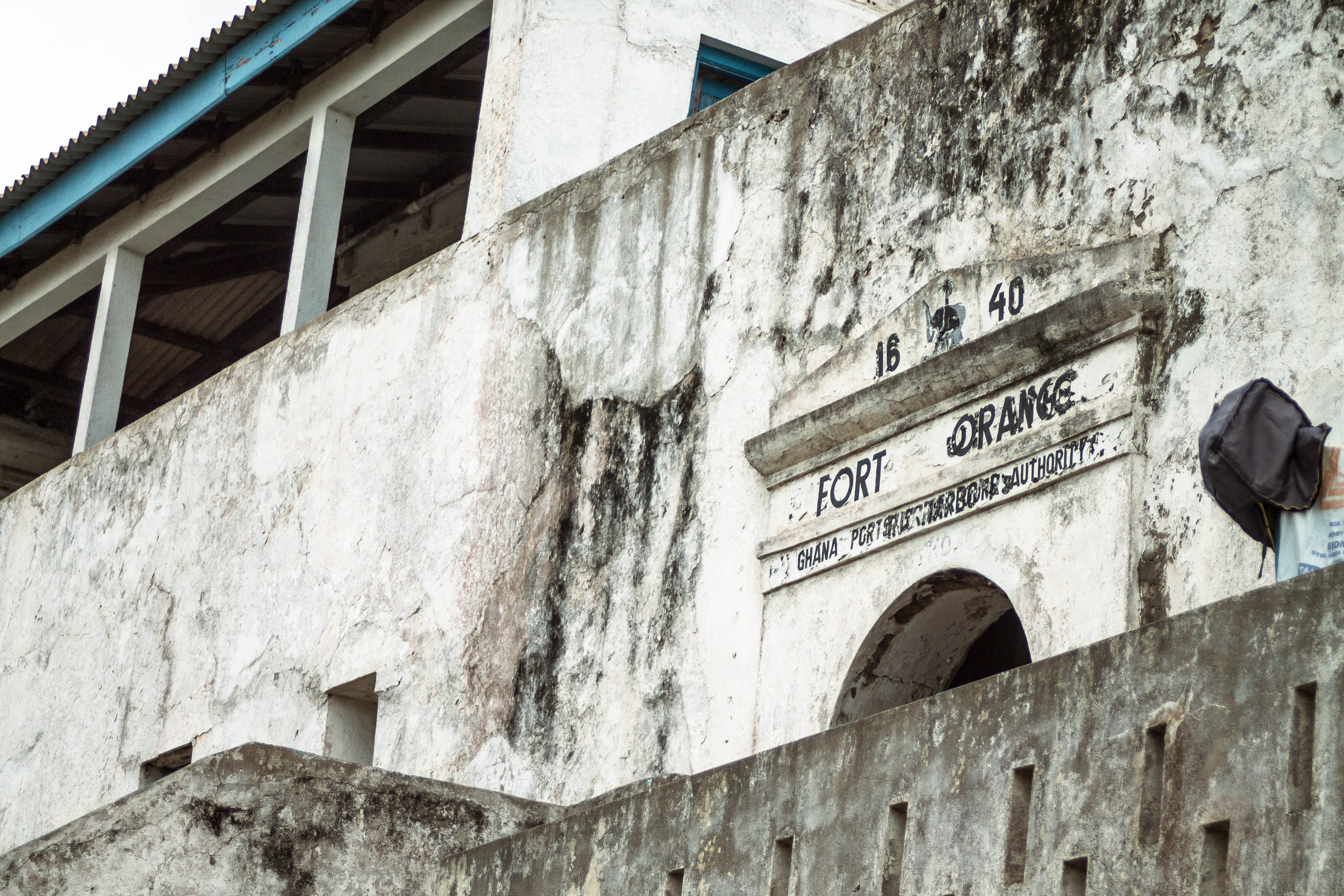

Site information
- Type: Coastal fort
- Owner: Ghana Museums & Monuments Board
- Controlled by: Netherlands (1642–1872)
- Open to the public: Yes
- Condition: Preserved / repurposed

Location
- Coordinates: 4.9357°N 1.7073°W
- Height: Approx. 12 m

Site history
- Built: 1642
- Built by: Dutch West India Company
- In use: 1642–1872
- Materials: Stone, brick
- Battles/wars: Attacked by Ahantas (1694), captured by Britain (1872)
- Events: Served as trading post and fort during Dutch Gold Coast period

Garrison information
- Current commander: N/A
- Garrison: Dutch West India Company
- Occupants: Netherlands (1642–1872)

UNESCO World Heritage Site
- Part of: Forts and Castles, Volta, Greater Accra, Central and Western Regions
- Criteria: Cultural: (vi)
- Reference: 34-008
- Inscription: 1979 (3rd Session)

Fort Orange (Dutch: Fort Oranje) is a fort located in Sekondi, Western Region, Ghana. Built by the Dutch in 1642, it was originally established as a trading lodge. The site was enlarged into a full fort in 1690 to support the growing European trade and to provide protection against local conflicts and rival European powers.

It is situated adjacent to the English-built Fort Sekondi, which was constructed in 1682. The fort was transferred to British control in 1872 along with the rest of the Dutch Gold Coast holdings, following the Anglo-Dutch treaty of that year.

== History ==
Fort Orange was first constructed as a lodge in 1642 by the Dutch West India Company to facilitate trade along the Gold Coast. During the 1670s, it operated as a trading post before being expanded into a fort in 1690. In September 1694, the fort was attacked by the Ahantas, which prompted reinforcement and remodeling of the structure to a full-fledged fortification by 1704.

== Current situation ==
Fort Orange used to serve as a lookout post but currently serves as a naval base for the Ghana Ports and Harbor Authority.

=== Significance ===
Fort Orange is part of the UNESCO World Heritage Site listing for the Forts and Castles of Ghana
