= Bombei Festival =

Festival in Ghana by the people of Ekyem Kofi in the Western region

Bombei Festival (Yam Festival) is an annual harvest festival celebrated by the chiefs and people of Ekyem Kofi near Sekondi in the Western Region of Ghana. It is usually celebrated in the month of July.

== Celebrations ==
During the festival, visitors are welcomed to share food and drinks. The people put on traditional clothes and there is durbar of chiefs. There is also dancing and drumming.

== Significance ==
This festival is celebrated to mark an event that took place in the past.
