= Takoradi European Public Cemetery =

Cemetery in Ghana

Coordinates: 4°54′21″N 1°46′28″W

Takoradi European Public Cemetery is in Ghana (previously known as The Gold Coast), situated north of the Takoradi Airport. It lies on the Takoradi-Axim road approximately 3 kilometres (1.9 mi) from the town centre next to the public cemetery. Burials here include two First World War Commonwealth graves, as well as 64 from Second World War which includes members of the South African Air Force 26 Squadron. There are five war graves from other nationalities and 25 non world war graves.
