= Ankos Festival =

Annual street carnival event in Ghana

Takoradi Masquerade Festival Ankos Festival
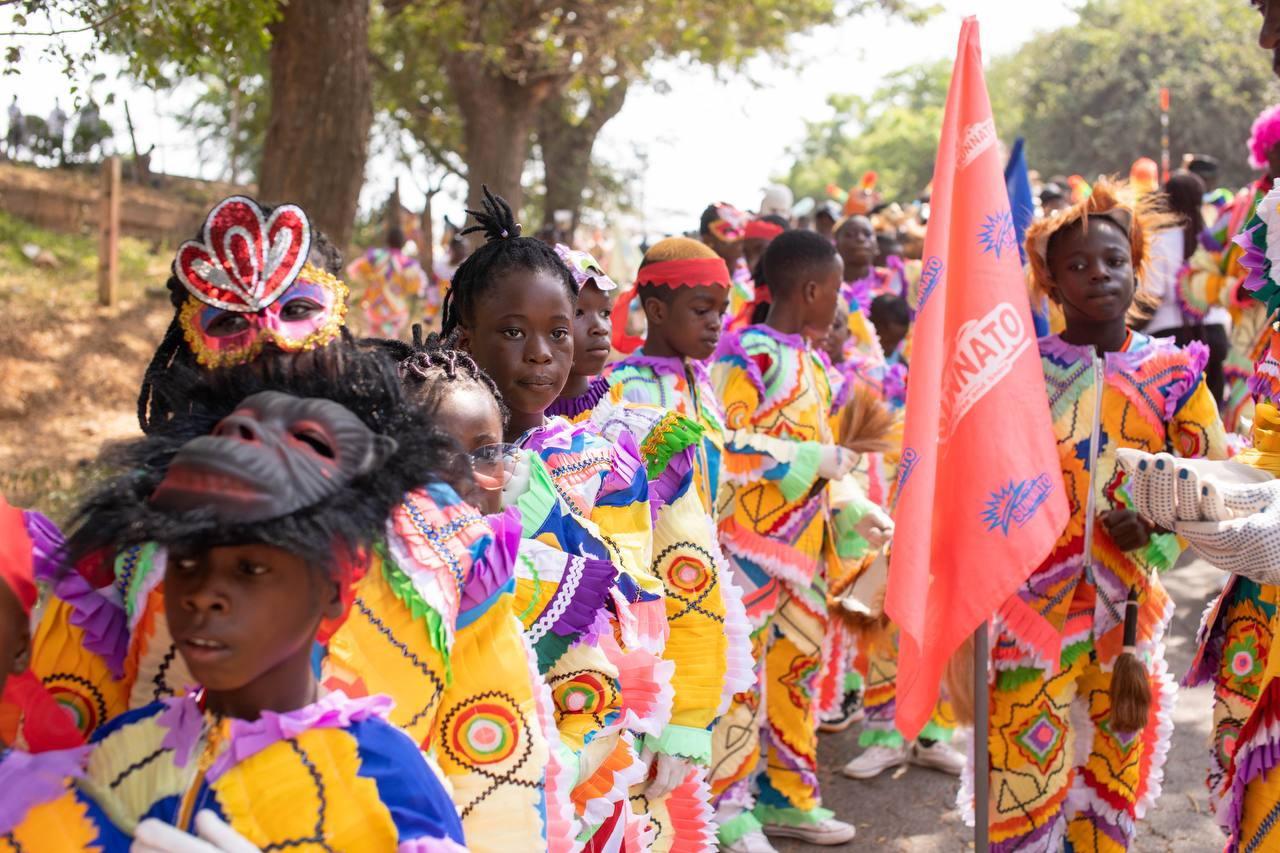
- Genre: Festival
- Frequency: Annually
- Location: Sekondi-Takoradi
- Coordinates: 04°55′00″N 01°46′00″W
- Country: Ghana
- Most recent: 26 December 2022
- Previous event: 24 December 2021
- Next event: 25 December 2025

The Ankos Festival also known as Takoradi street carnival or Masquerade Festival is an annual event celebrated by the people of Sekondi-Takoradi, Ghana. Its main attraction is dozens of groups of people or teams dressing in wild outfits who display their skills and arts via dance. The festival is usually celebrated from 24–26 December of every year, and is popular with tourists.

== Masquerades groups ==
These are the list of masquerades groups in Takoradi.

- Ankos
- Cosmos
- Holy Cities
- Nyanta Boys
- Iron Fighters
- Unity
- Missisipi
- Spain
- Sunnato
- Valencia
- Canadians
- Chinese
- Tumus
- Ohyewakomem
- Supreme
- Oil city
- Millionaires
- Unicon
- Addyzee
- USA
- Nyanta Boys and Girls
- Punch
- Gye Nyame
- Miami

== Ethnography ==
The various masquerades groups come together in the township of Takoradi to display their skills, culture and other arts to the general public through dancing and singing of various songs using brass band. The festival consist of different gender groups joining from various walks of life. It involves the young and the old who are much passionate about the culture and art during this festive moment. Their fancy outfit for the festival varies from one group to another. During the festival the brass band team play all kind of sounds, songs, melodies and tunes to spice up the festivity and also increase the excitement of various participant and watchers of the event who stand across the road, rooftops and balcony.

It is believed that the first fancy club set up was the Ankos Fancy Club

== The Year of Return ==
The Year of Return was to mark the return of black people from the diaspora to meet and learn about Ghanaian culture and partake in local traditions and so forth. The Year of Return had a massive impact on the Masquerade festival because it had a lot of tourists, the majority being black people from the diaspora trooping into Takoradi to celebrate the festival.

== Festival anthem ==
The song 'Made in Tadi' by Ghanaian highlife artiste, Kofi Kinaata is regarded as the anthem for this period. Born and bred in Effiakuma, one of the suburbs of Takoradi and home to some indigenes of the area, the song gives a trajectory of this event (that has grown to become a festival) and how things pan out during that period. It gives insight on how life in Takoradi during Christmas, and how people from all walks of life mark it. Made in Tadi also gives a record of some of the fancy clubs that take part in the festival.

== 2019 Artist ==
- Kofi Kinaata
- Quamina Mp

== Gallery ==
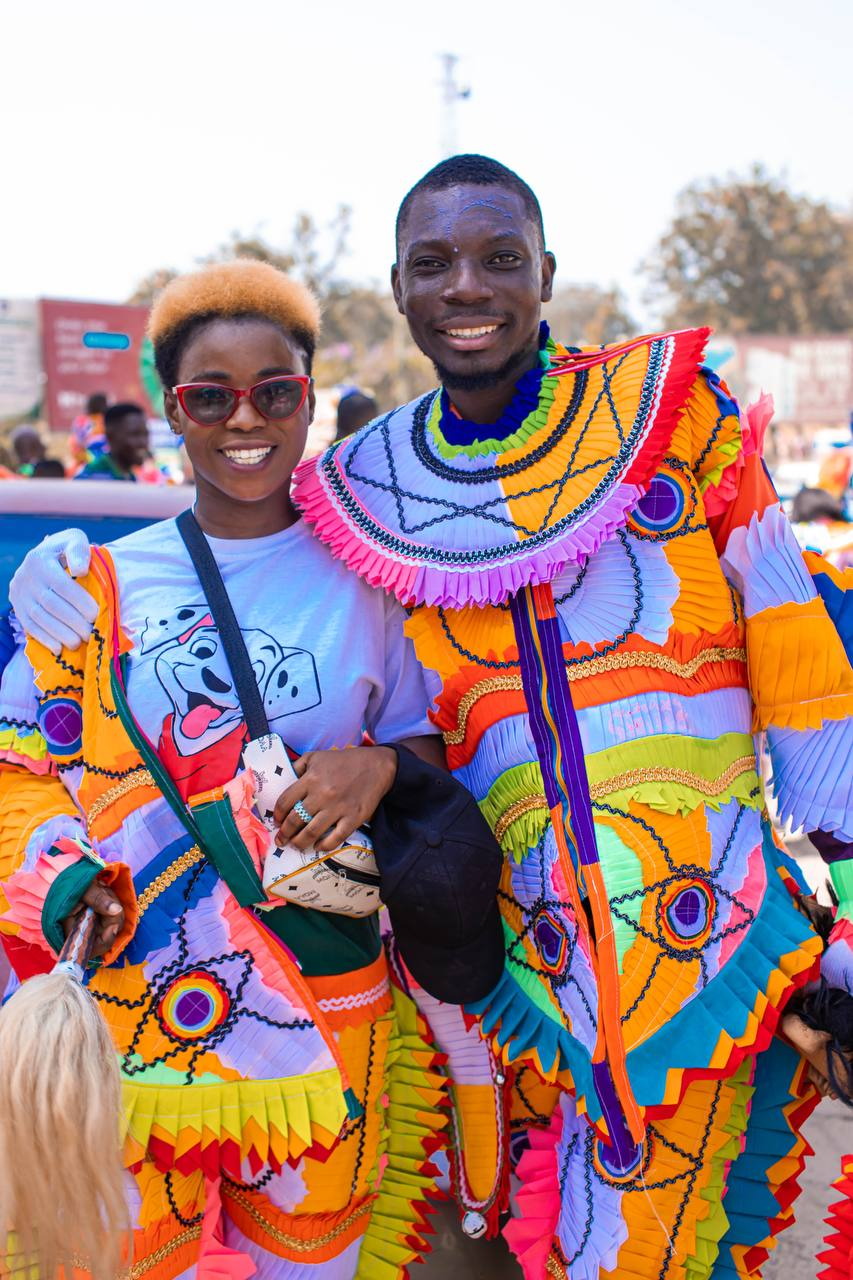

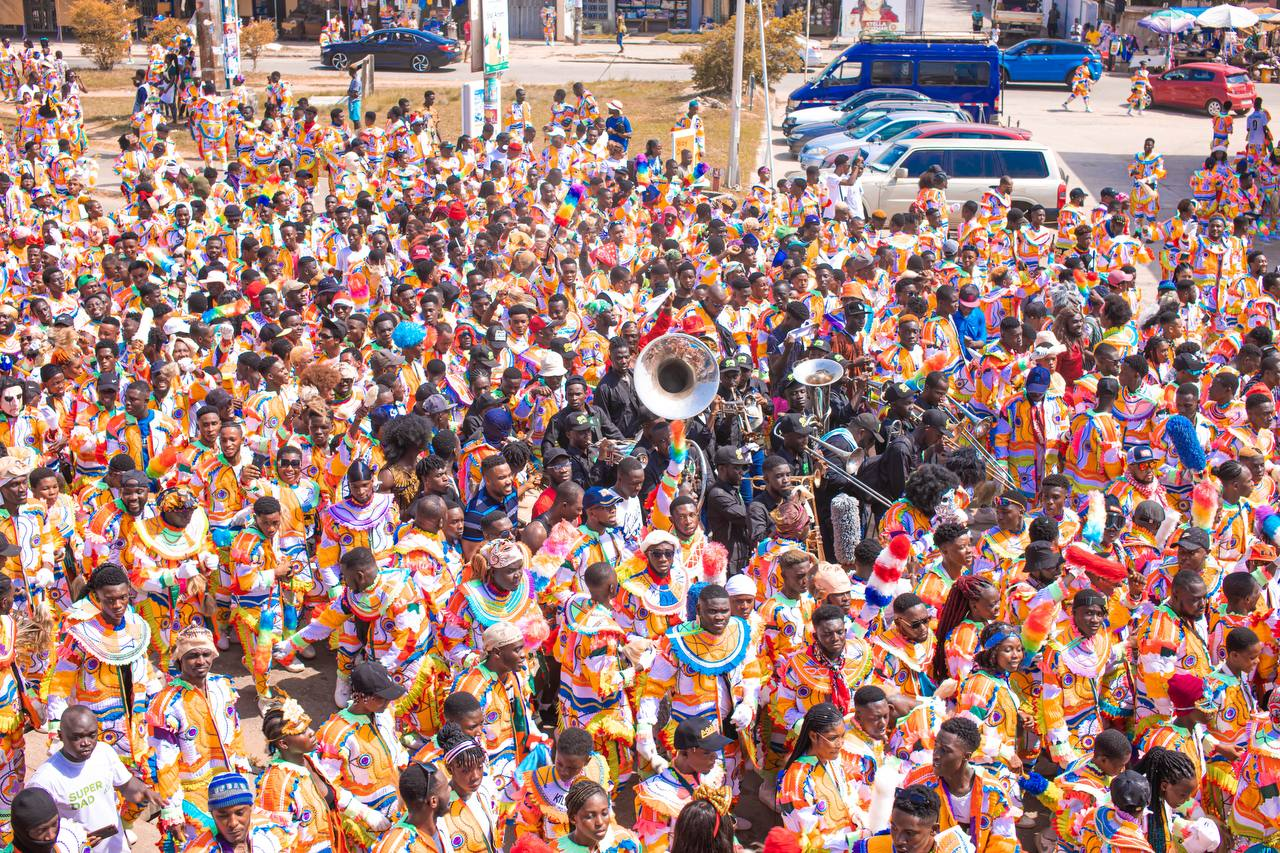

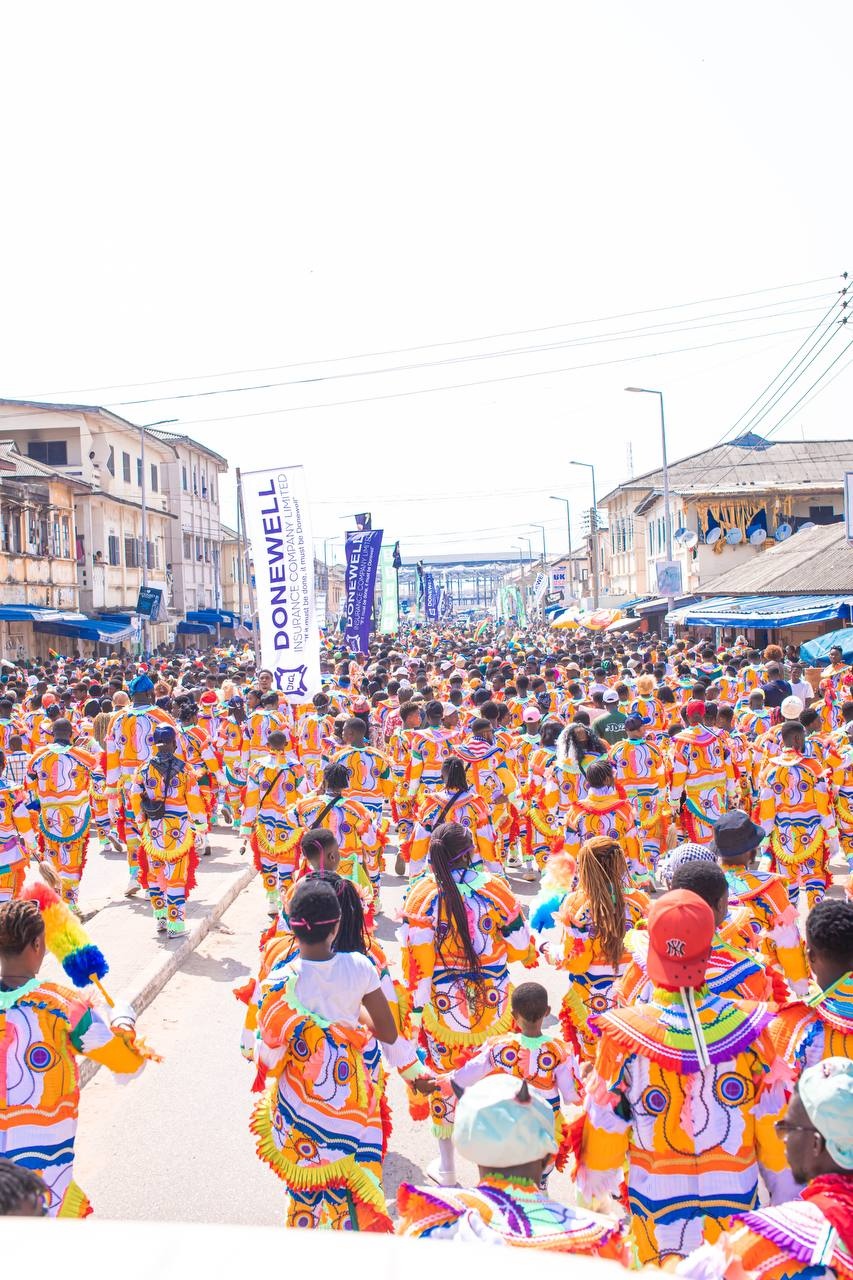

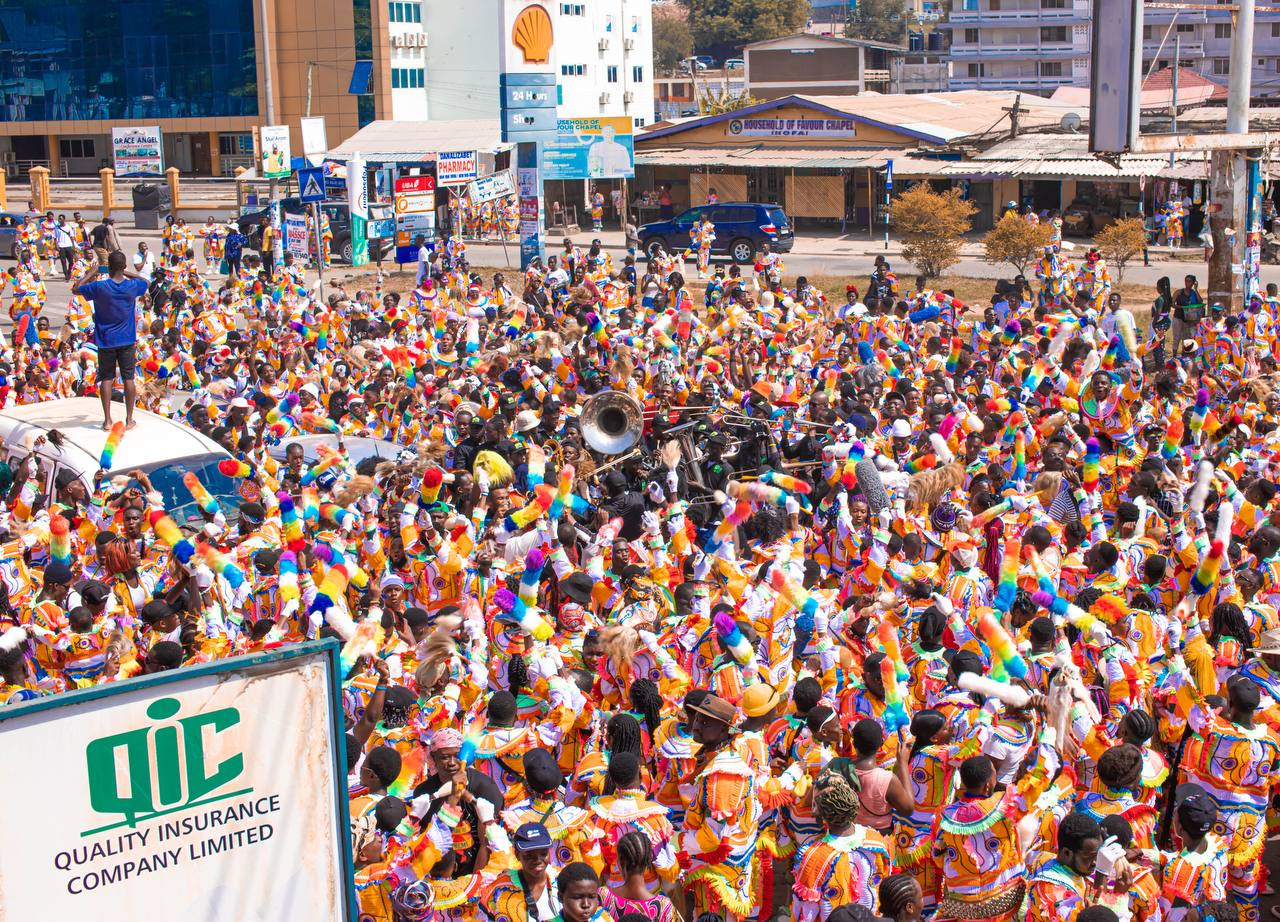

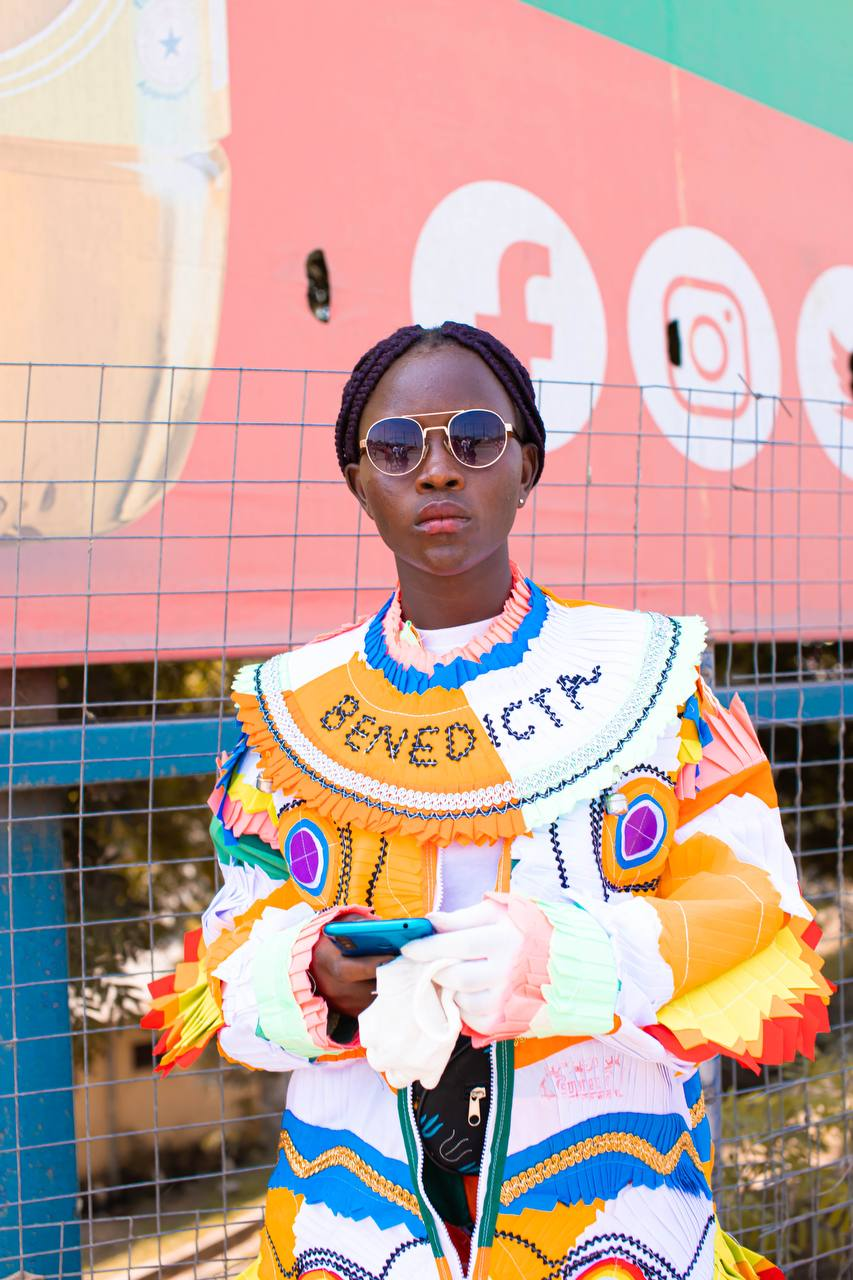

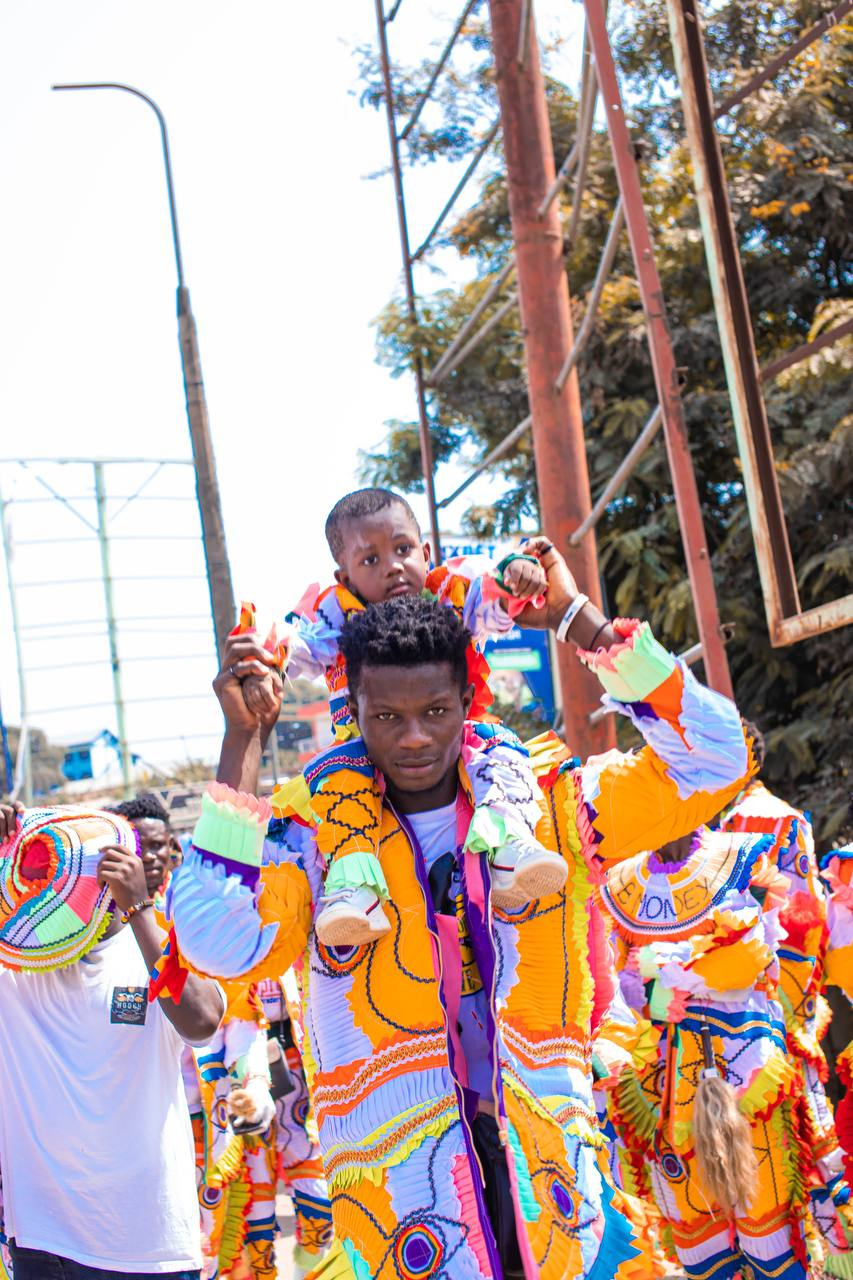

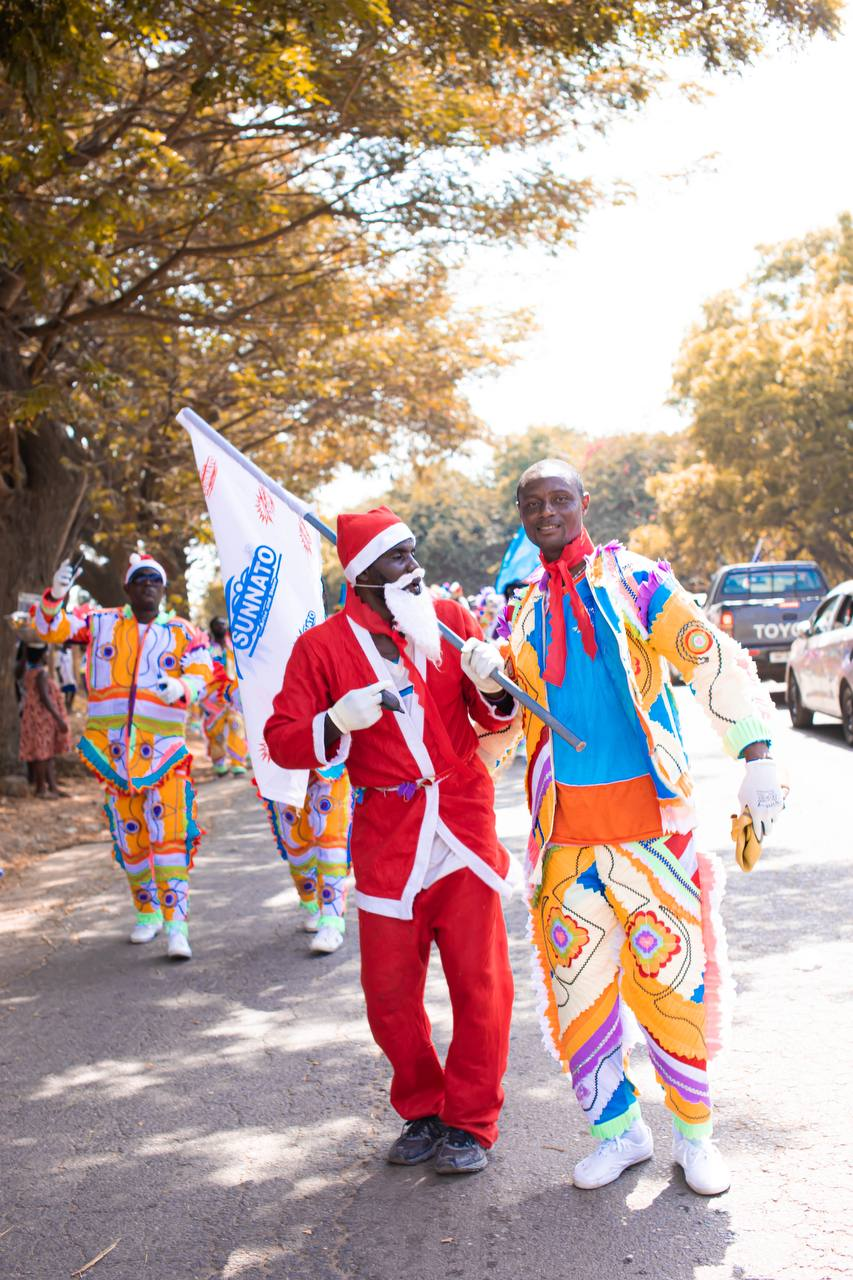

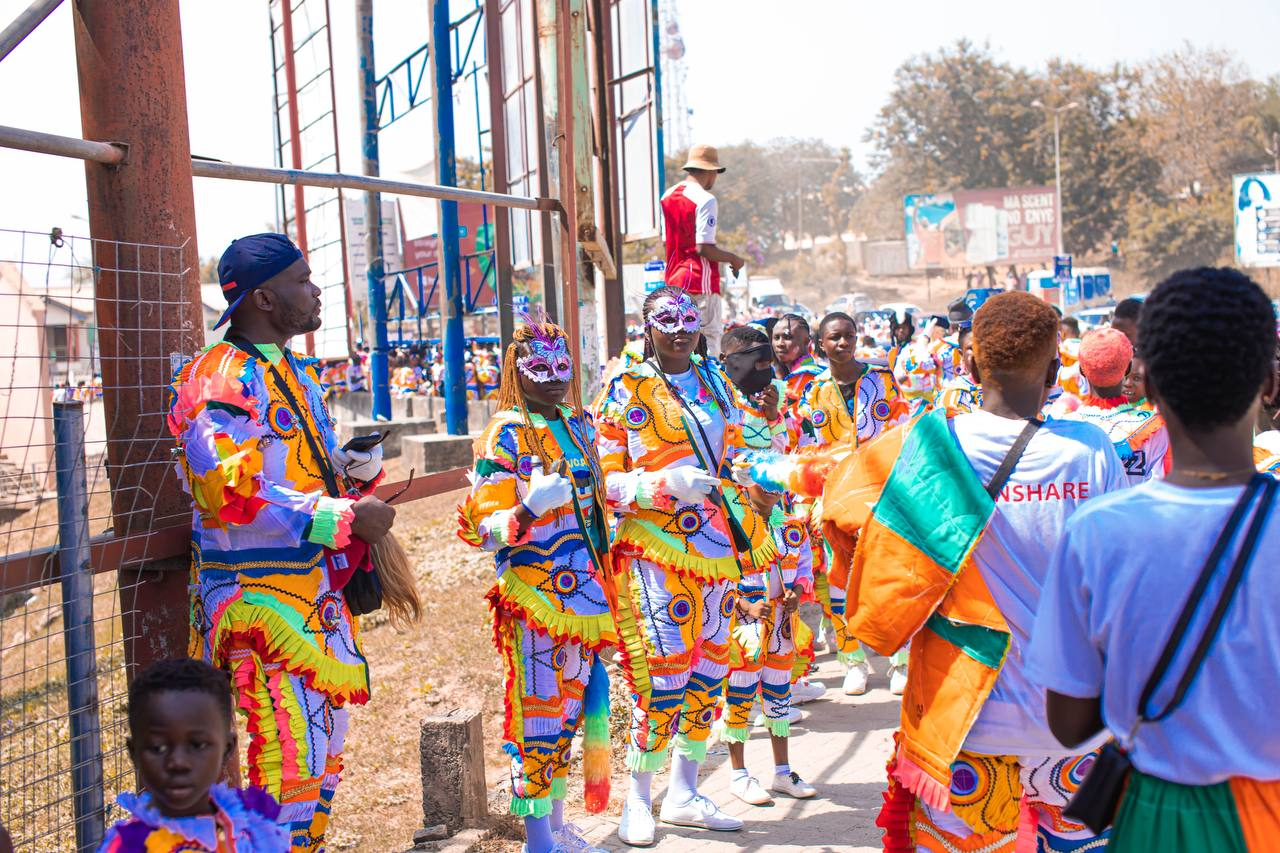

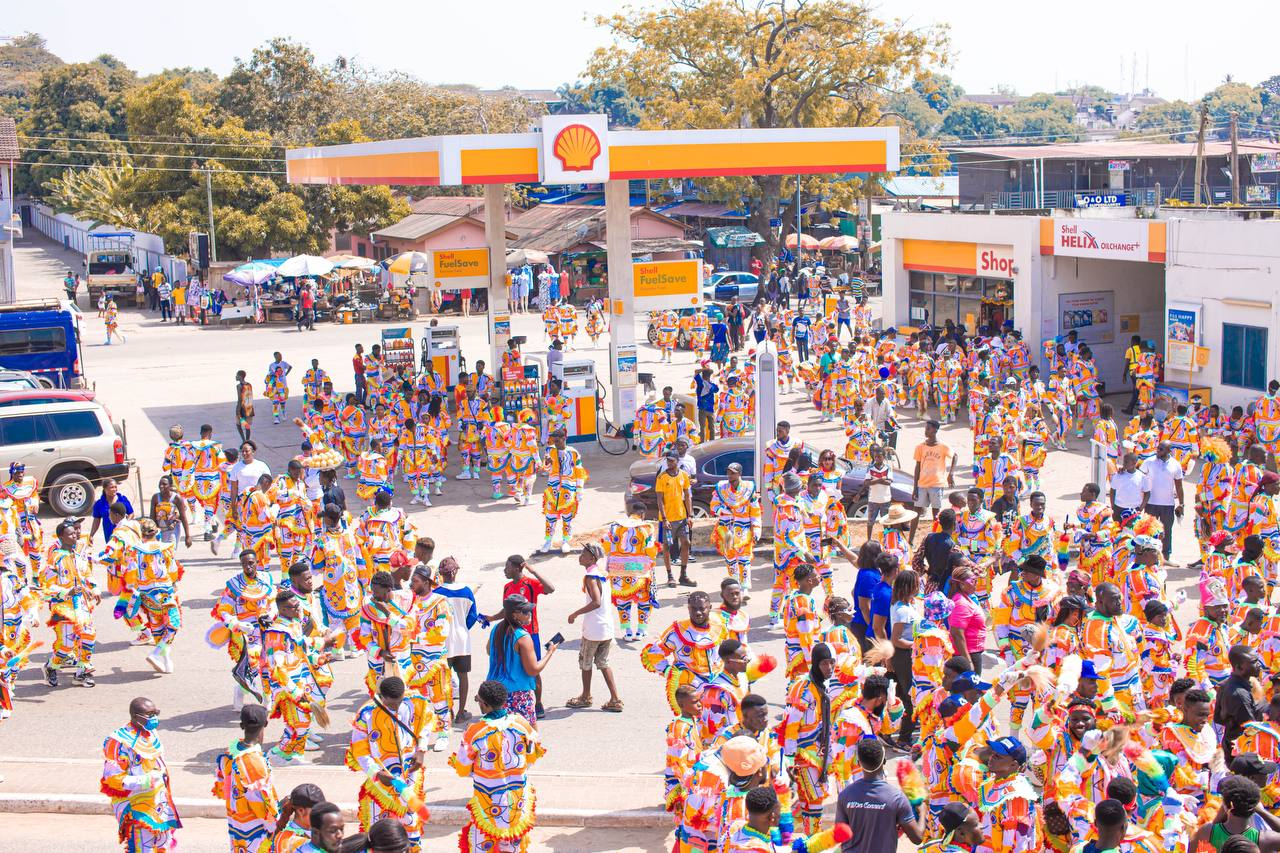

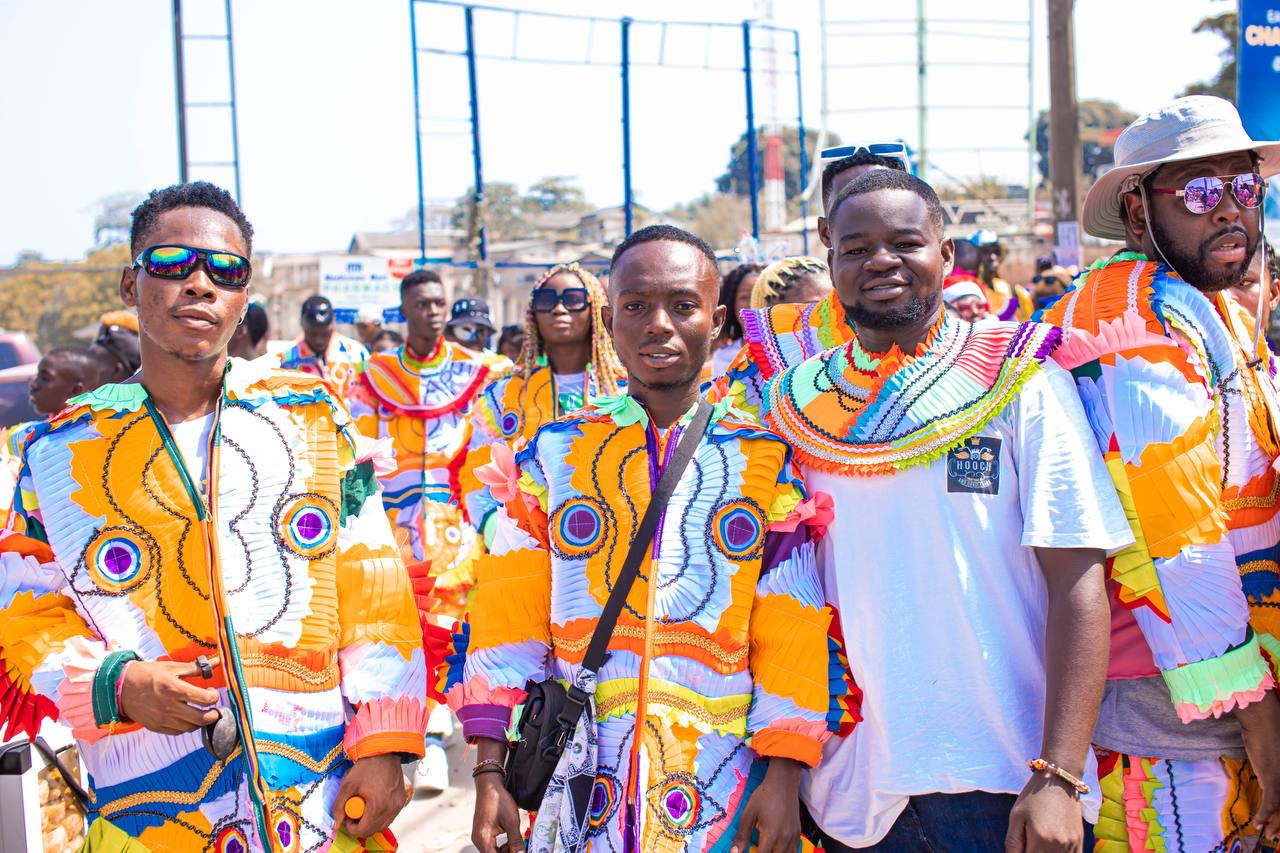

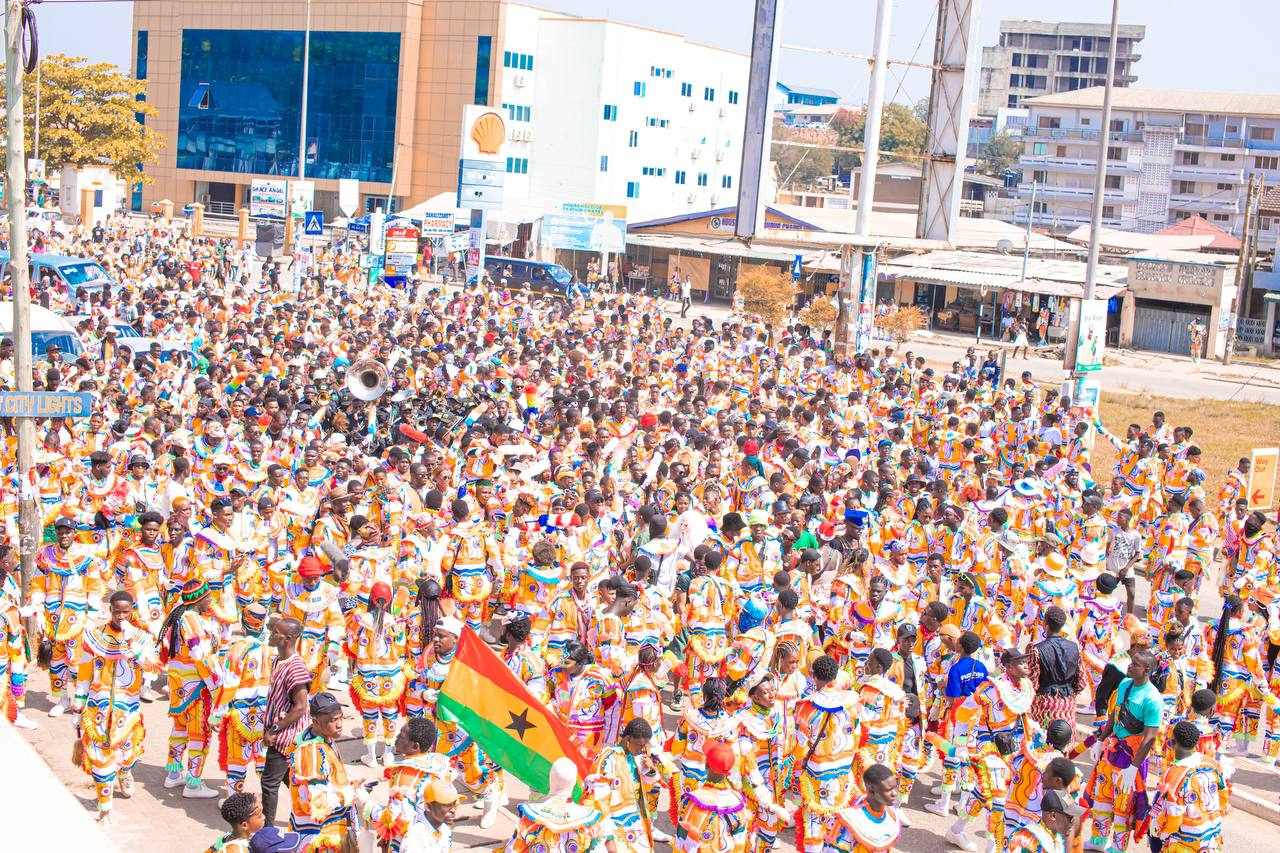

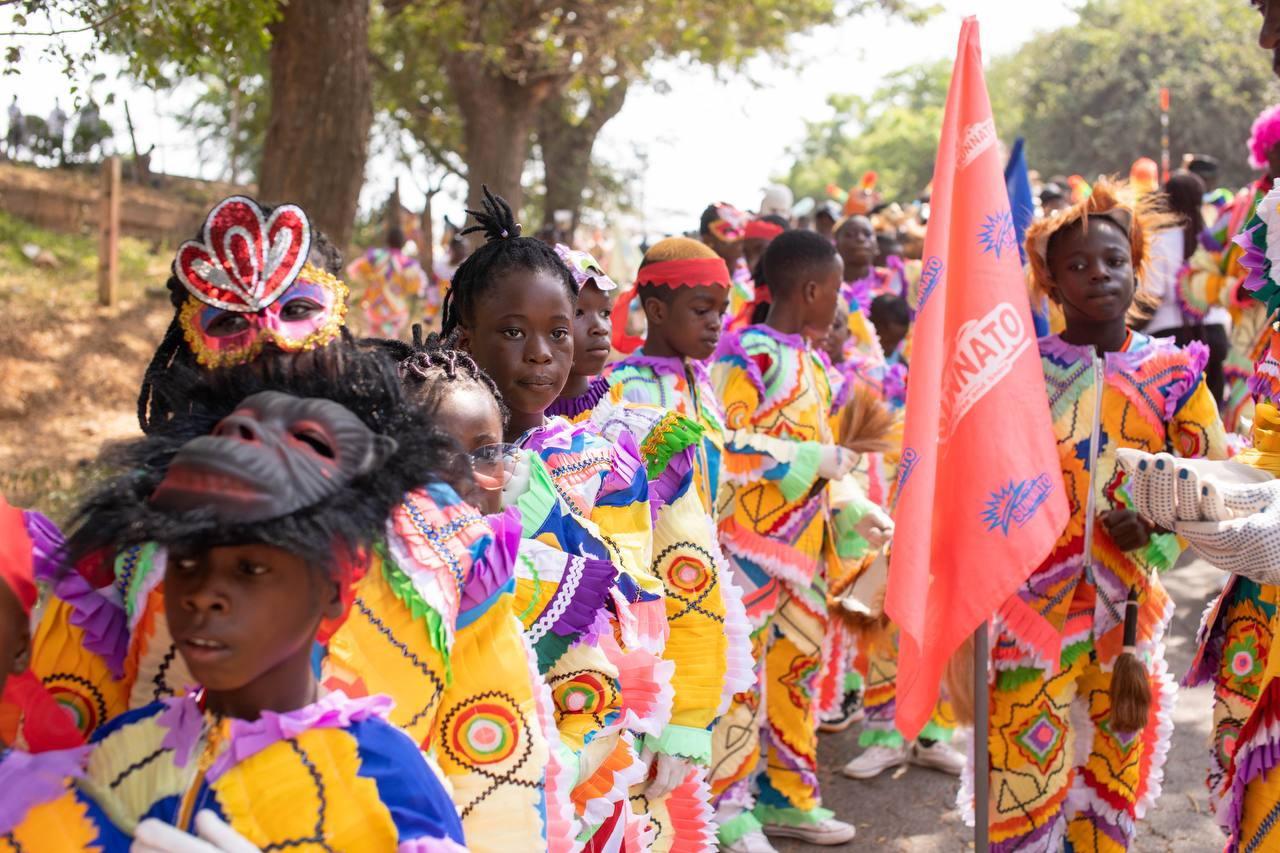

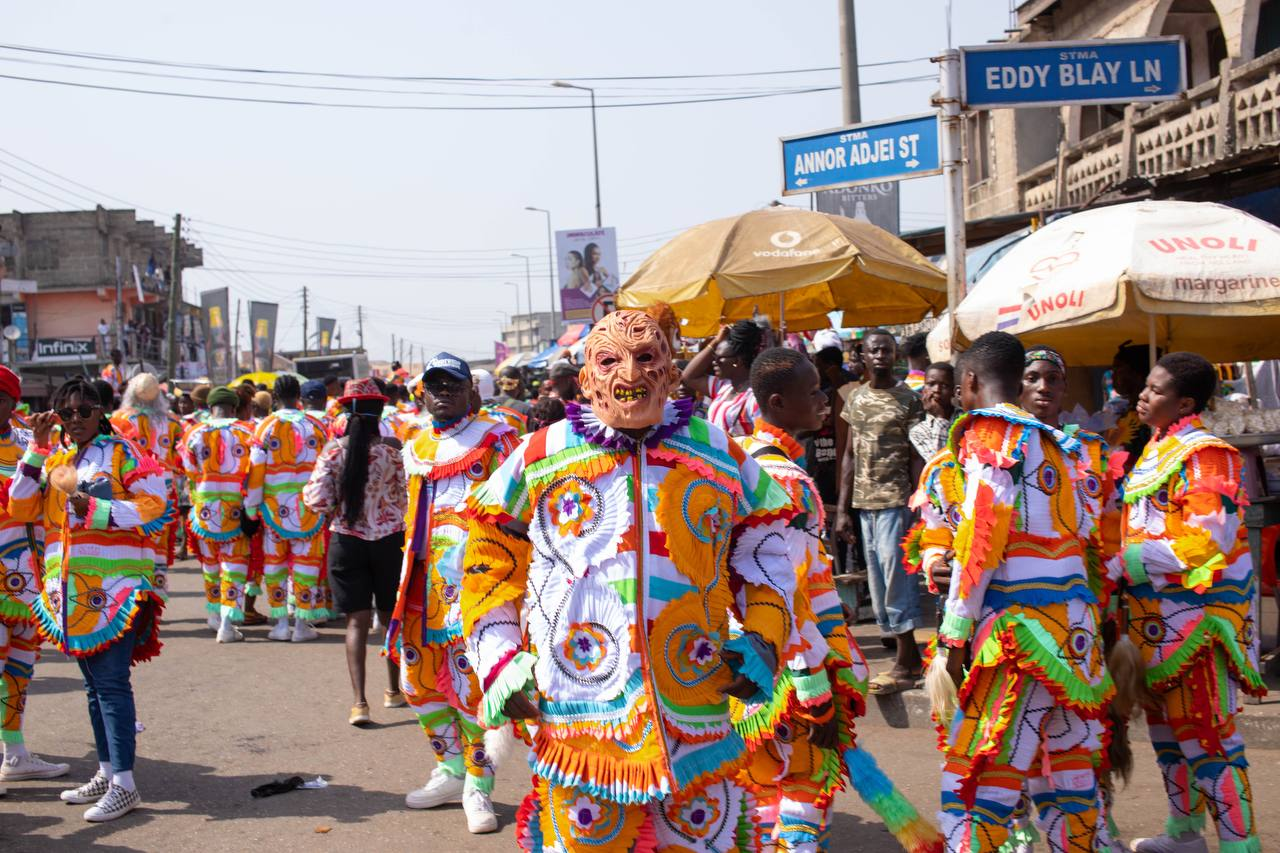

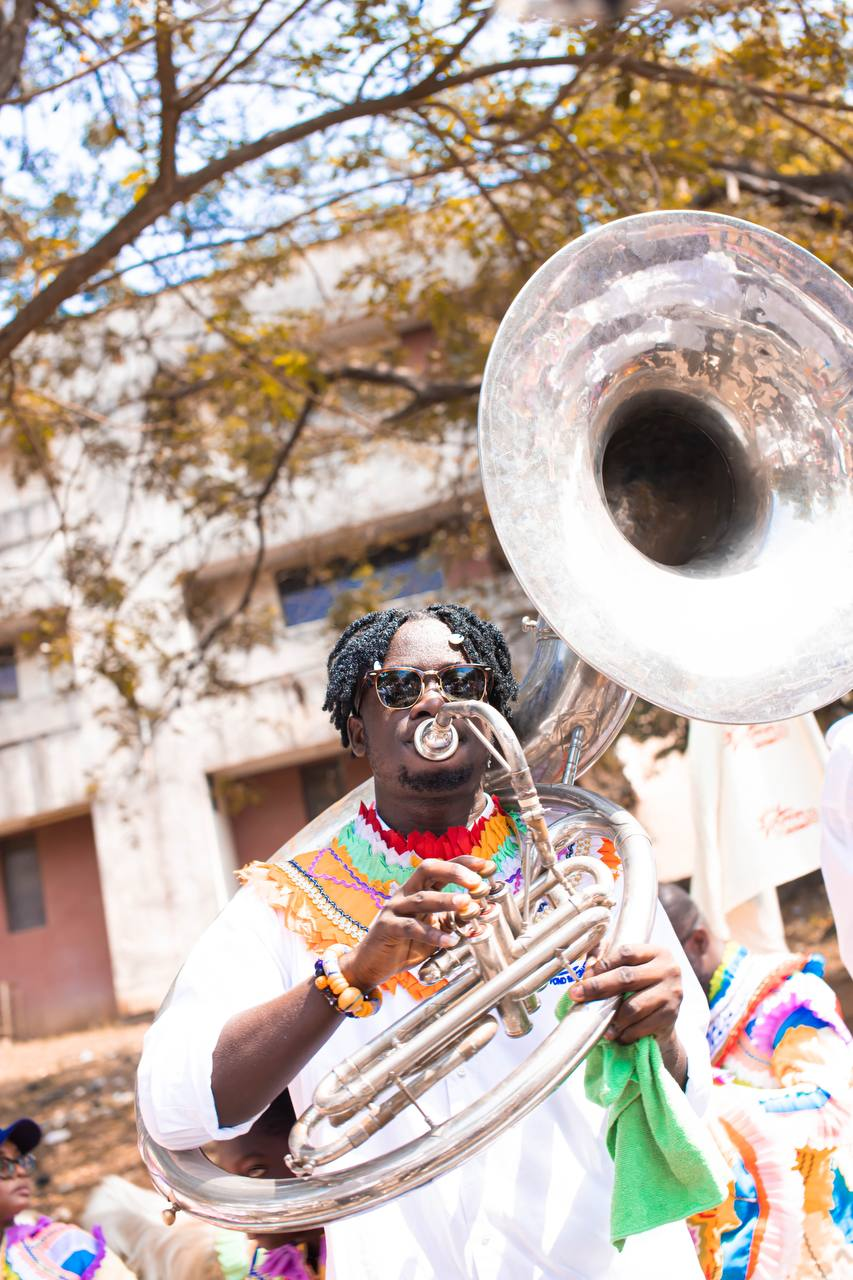

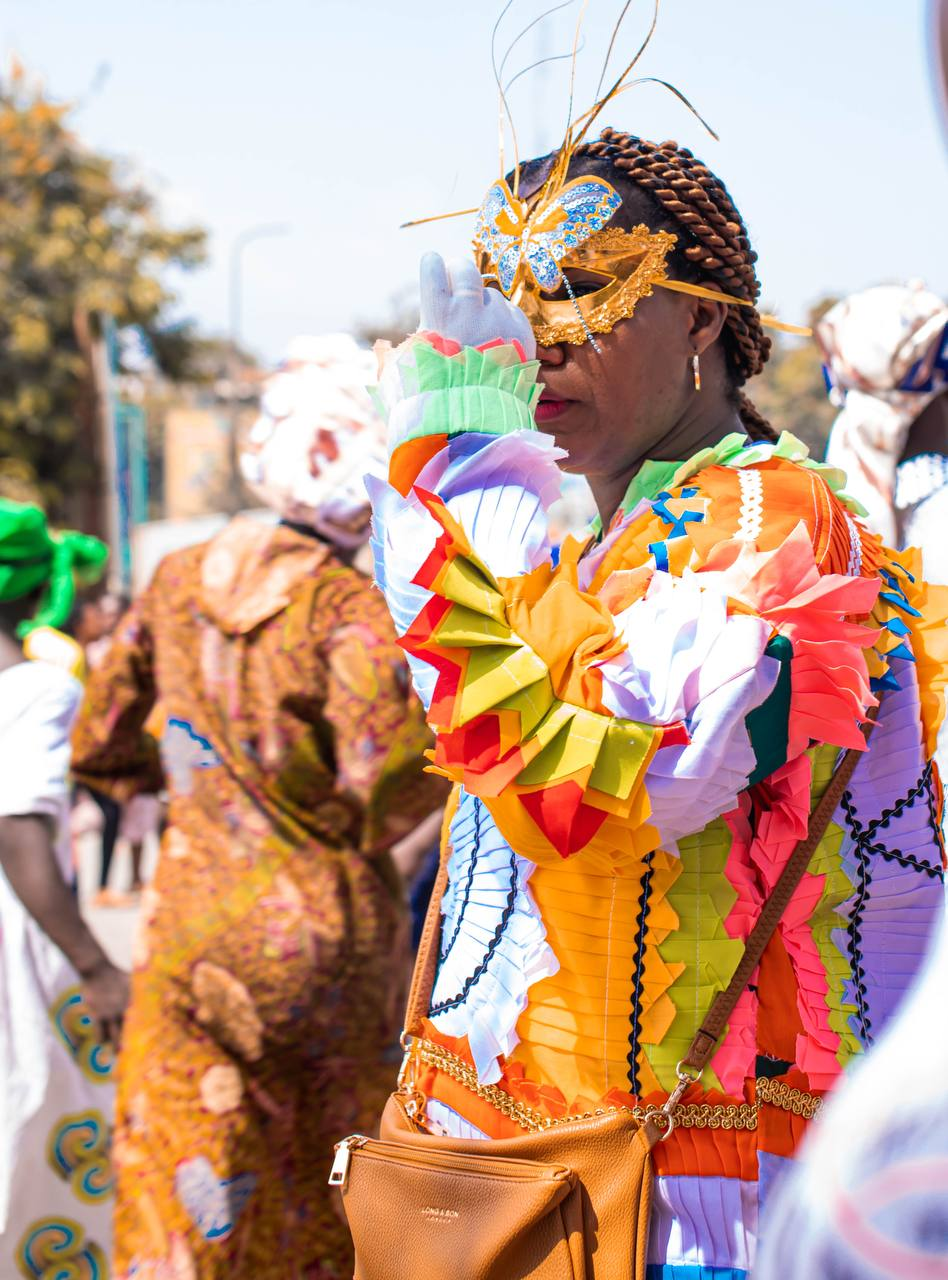

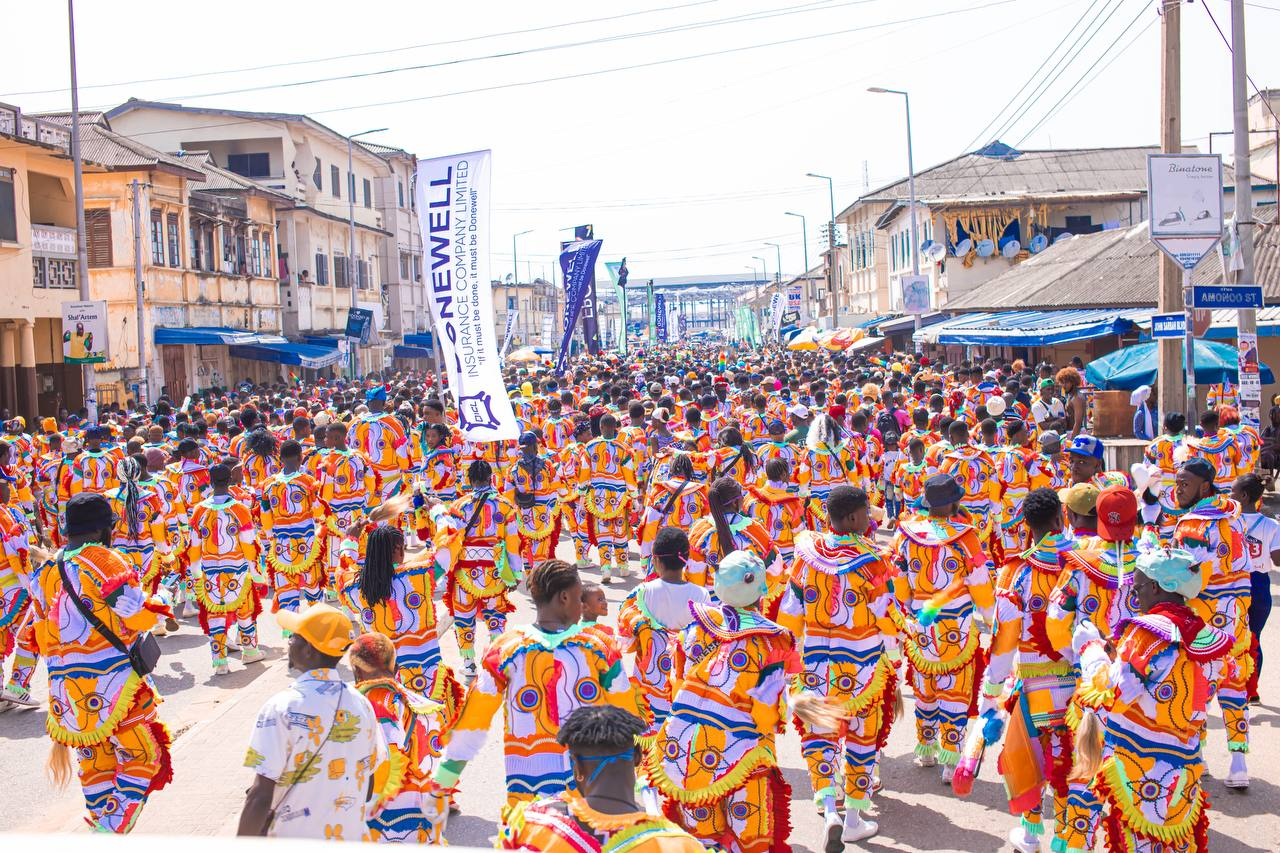

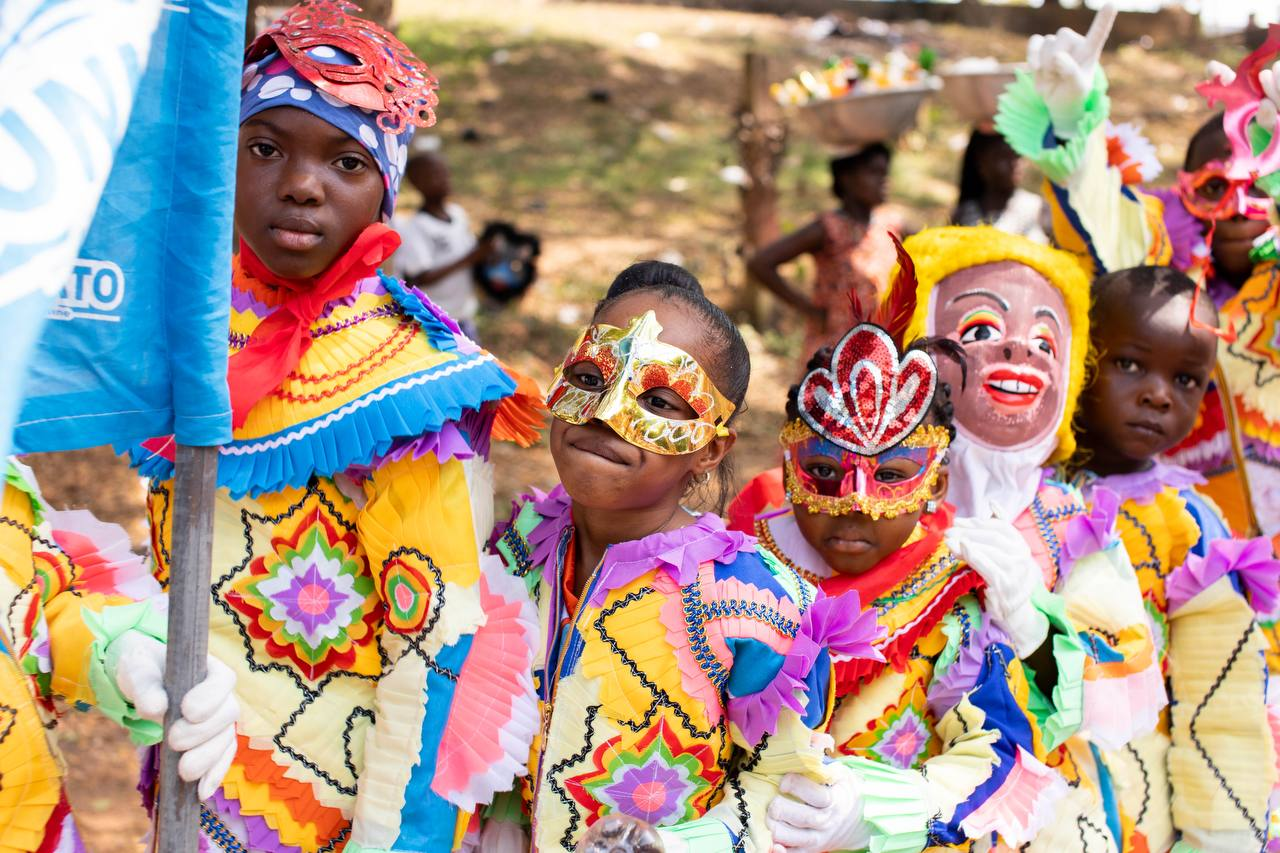

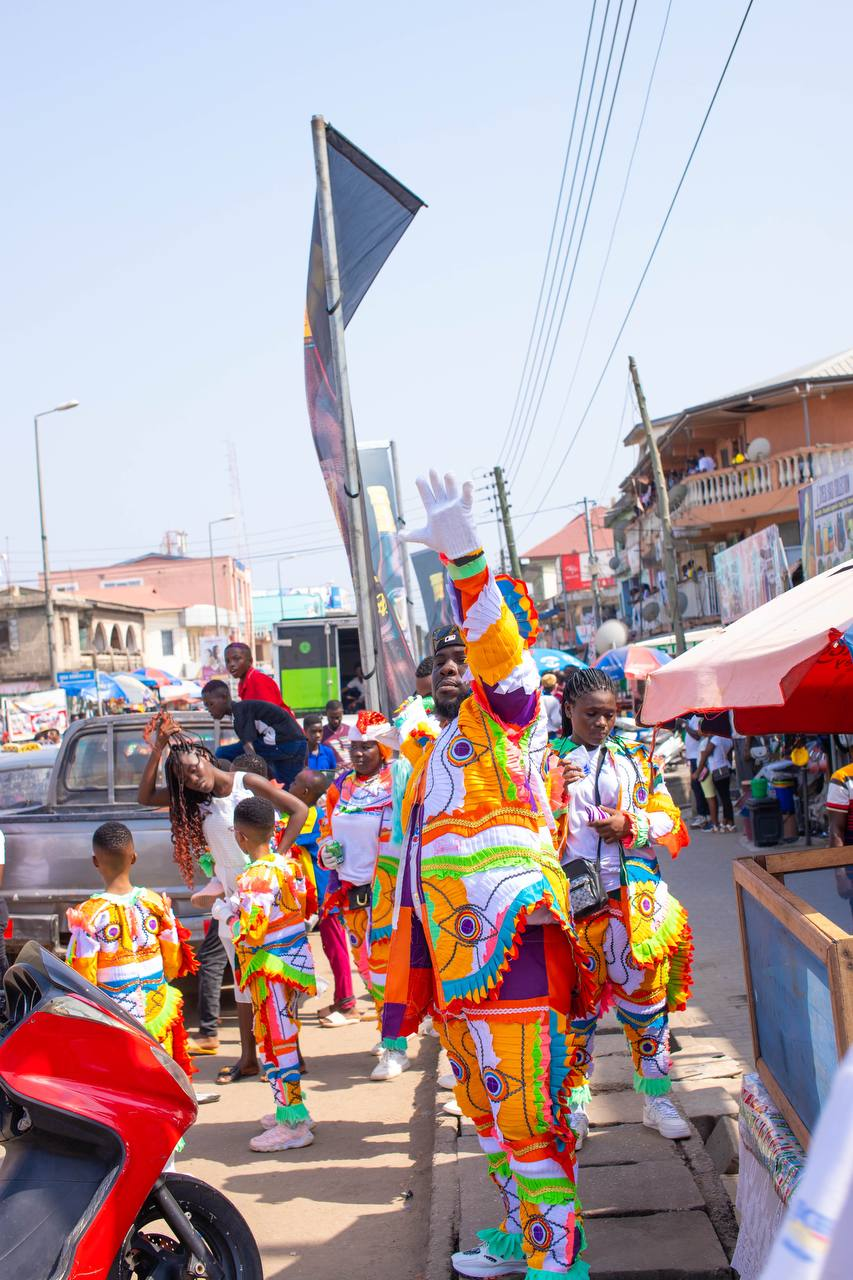

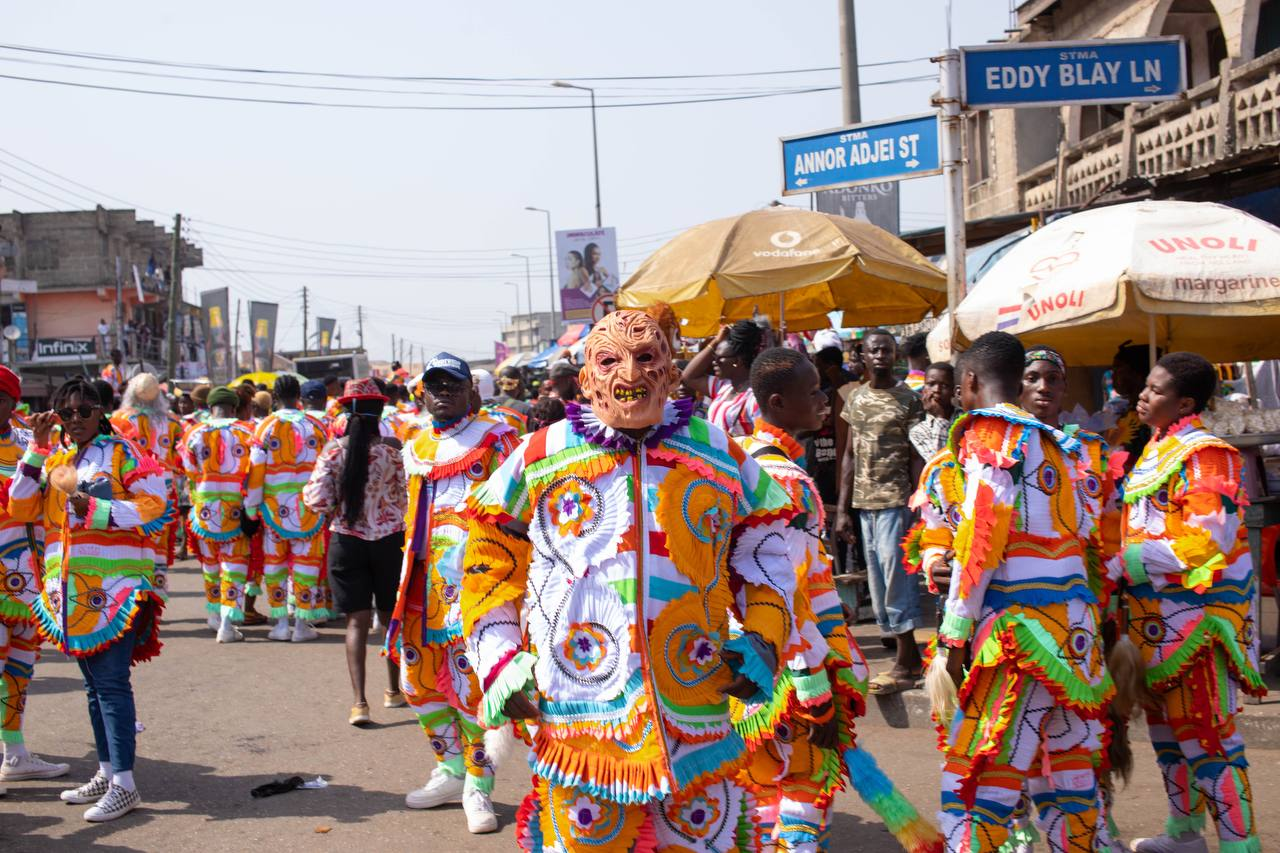

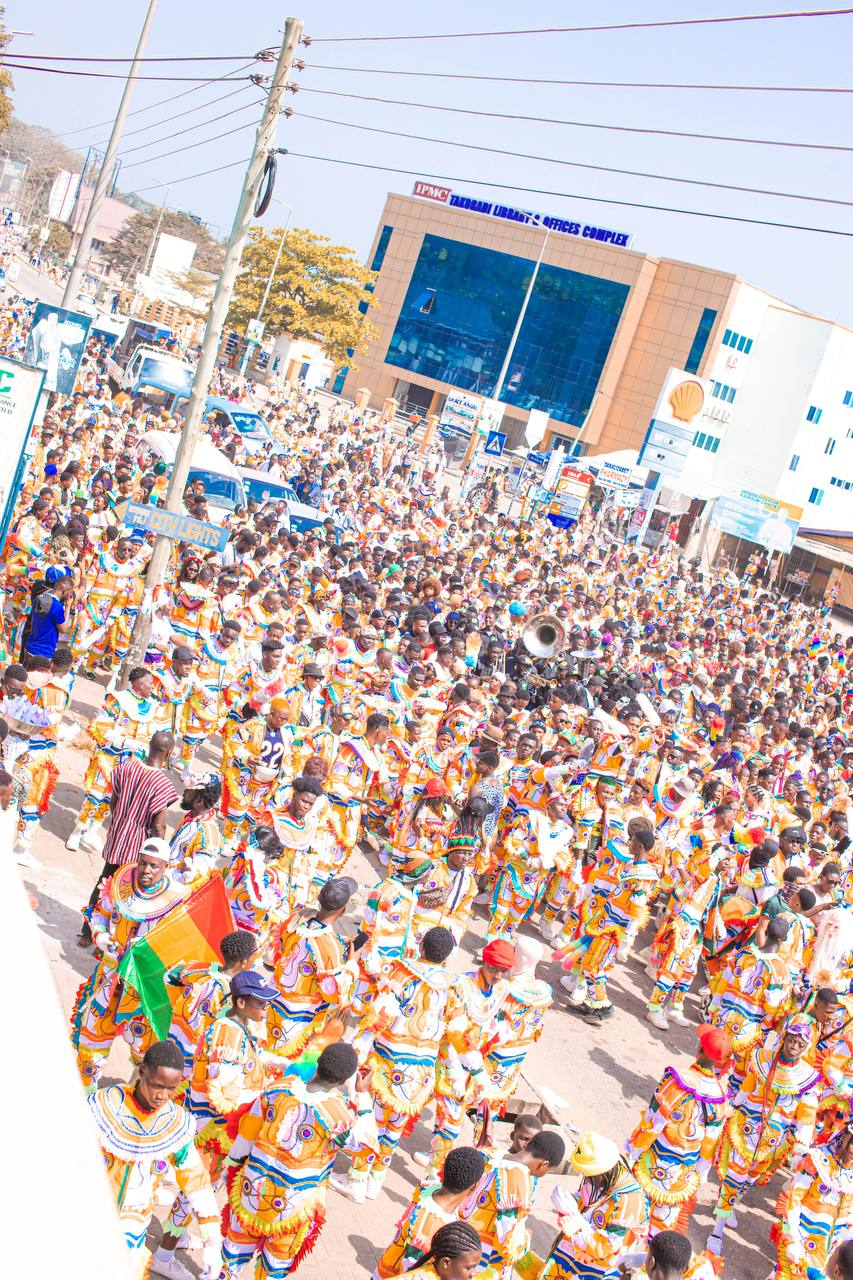
