= DJ Shiwaawa =

Ghanaian DJ

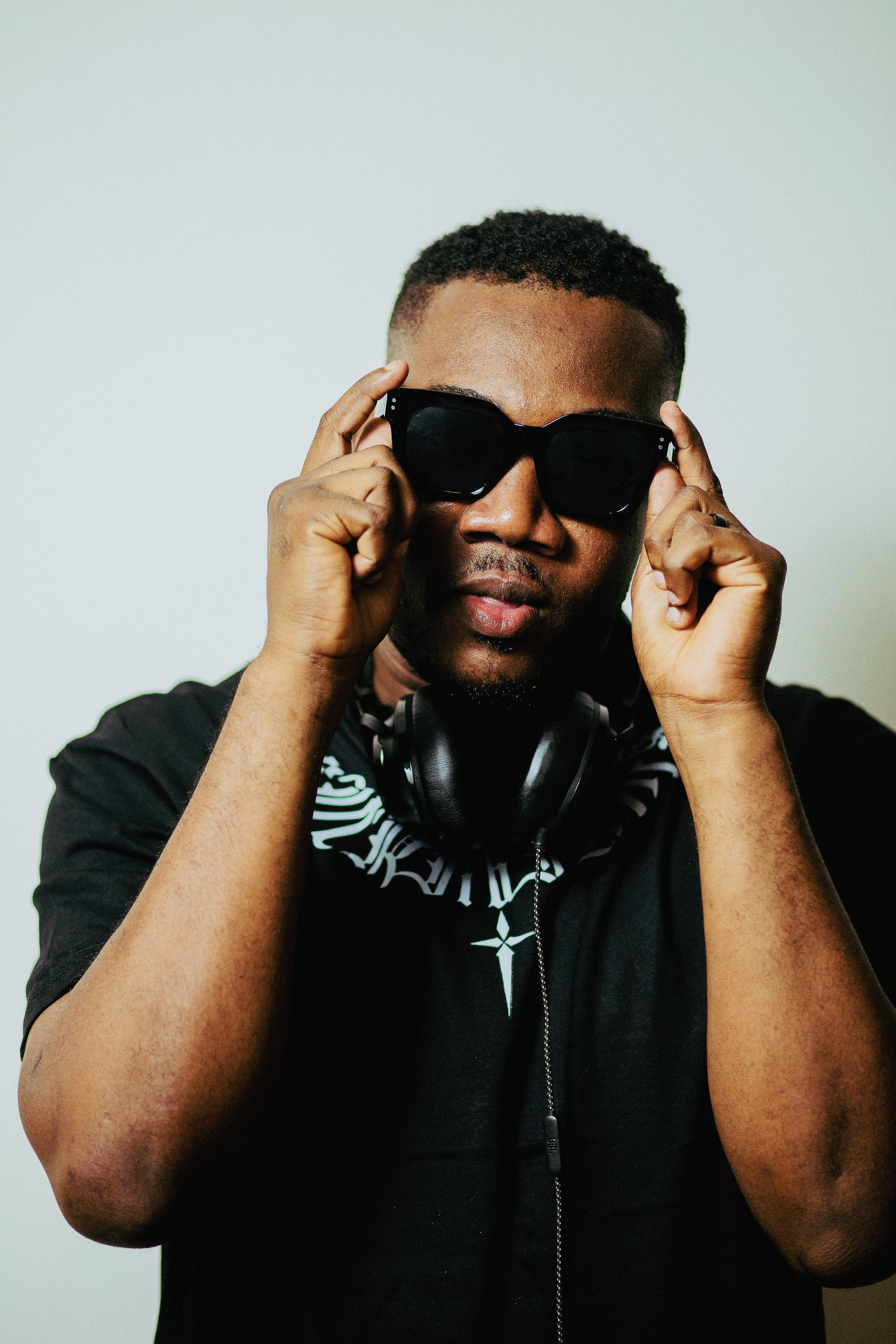
- Where the beats drop, DJ Shiwaawa rises

Background information
- Born: Terry Amoah Arthur; August 2
- Occupations: Disc Jockey, Songwriter, entrepreneur
- Years active: 2013 – present

Terry Amoah Arthur, popularly known as DJ Shiwaawa, is a Ghanaian disc jockey, entrepreneur, and performer, widely celebrated for his dynamic turntable skills and genre-spanning versatility. Active in the music industry since 2001, he has established himself as one of the most sought-after DJs in West Africa, particularly noted for his ability to mix across genres such as Afrobeats, R&B, Hip-Hop, Amapiano, Highlife, Funk and more. He won the Artiste DJ of the year in the 2018 edition of the Ghana DJ Awards while working with late Ebony.

== Career ==
DJ Shiwaawa began his DJ career at a young age, performing at his mother's bar, Sweet City, in Nyakrom while still in primary school.

He rose to prominence in the local music scene for his energetic performances and wide-ranging musical taste. In 2016, he gained significant recognition in the industry when he was nominated for Artist DJ of the Year and Discovery DJ of the Year at the Ghana DJ Awards. These nominations marked a significant milestone in his career, highlighting his rising influence and talent in the Ghanaian entertainment landscape.

He worked with RuffTown Records, serving as the personal DJ for the late Ebony Reigns. He also collaborated with the music group VVIP, working with them on various projects. Over the years, he has performed alongside or served as personal DJ for a number of notable Ghanaian artists, including Reggie Rockstone, Samini, VVIP, the late Ebony Reigns, Wendy Shay, Adina Thembi, Trigmatic, and Freda Rhymz.

His career has also extended into media, where he has worked with key media houses such as 4syte TV, Viasat 1 Television, Onua TV and Kwese Sports Television.

== Awards and recognition ==
- Ghana DJ Awards 2016 - DJ Discovery of the Year (Nominee)
- Ghana DJ Awards 2016 - Artist DJ of the Year (Nominee)
- Ghana DJ Awards 2018 - Artist DJ of the Year

== Performances and Tours ==
DJ Shiwaawa has played at major venues and events in Ghana and internationally. His global tour has seen him perform in countries such as Nigeria, Australia, Fiji, Samoa, and the Cook Islands. Notable venues include:

- Accra Sports Stadium, Ghana
- Eco Hotel, Lagos, Nigeria
- Gold Coast Performance at Queensland
- Kiza Lounge, Dubai, UAE
- The Argyle, Sydney, Australia
- Beach Club Wailoala, Fiji
- Hula Bar, Rarotonga

== Discography ==
DJ Shiwaawa has released several well-received tracks and collaborations, showcasing his production talents. These include:

- Agoro (feat. Adina Thembi)
- Nipples (with Sheldon The Turn Up)
- NBA (with Kwaysi)
- NSA (feat. Fameye, Amakye, Akiyana, Suzzblaqq)
- Body Call (feat. Scata Bada & Zeal)
- Dada Ewu Riddim
- Highness (feat. Danny Beatz)

== Advocacy and Projects ==
Beyond performance, DJ Shiwaawa is also involved in promoting Ghanaian and African music globally through his self-initiated projects. One of his notable initiatives is “Music Tourism,” a platform aimed at combining travel and live music experiences to showcase African music and culture to the world.

== Contact and Social Media ==
- Instagram: @djshiwaawa
- YouTube: @DJShiwaawa
- TikTok: @djshiwaawa
