= Quainoo =

Quainoo is a Ghanaian surname. Notable people with the surname include:

- Arnold Quainoo, Ghanaian military officer
- Bernard Quainoo (born 1987), Dutch footballer
- Ivy Quainoo (born 1992), German singer
- Margaret Quainoo (1941–2006), Ghanaian actress
- Solomon Quainoo, Ghanaian pilot
