= Kwaysi =

- Also known as: Ahkan, Osrane
- Born: Clement Foh Baah; 6 February 1988 (age 38); Accra, Ghana
- Genre: Afrobeats Afropop music
- Years active: 2008–present
- Label: Hitz in Motion Records
- Member of: Ruff n Smooth

Clement Foh Baah (born February 1988) is a Ghanaian musician and songwriter known as Kwaysi (previously known as Ahkan and Osrane). He is a member of the music group Ruff n Smooth with Ricky Nana Agyemang (aka Bullet), manager of Dancehall act Ebony Reigns.

== Music career ==
Osrane was discovered in 2001 with singles including Ohi Niwa and Suro Nipa. In early 2005, he had a breakthrough song dubbed 'Eye Asem' (Your Wife & Your Mother, song produced by Morris Babyface.) Osrane then met Bullet to form a group. That was the beginning of Ruff N Smooth where Etuoaboba took the name Bullet (Ruff) and Osrane took Ahkan (Smooth). They released their first single, Medi Wo Dwa which was remixed by Ebony Reigns as Hustle. Following "Medi Wo Dwa", they also released "Monalisa". Their third single "Swagger" became their first international hit.

== Solo projects ==
June 2017, Ahkan announced release of Barawo (Thief). Another single "Amina" talks about the barriers in inter-marriage in the world, especially Africa.

=== Collaborations ===
Ahkan has worked with artists including Bay C of T.O.K, the African dancehall artist Shatta Wale, Asumadu and Wizboy. He was featured on a release by Duke, former member of D2.

In July 2020 he featured Ablekuma Nana Lace, AY Poyoo and Shatta Bundle on the song Blessing.The song was mixed by Tom Beatz, produced by Citrus Beatz and hosted by DJ Xpliph
