= Koforidua Senior High Technical School =

Koforidua Secondary Technical School
- KSTS(SECTECH)
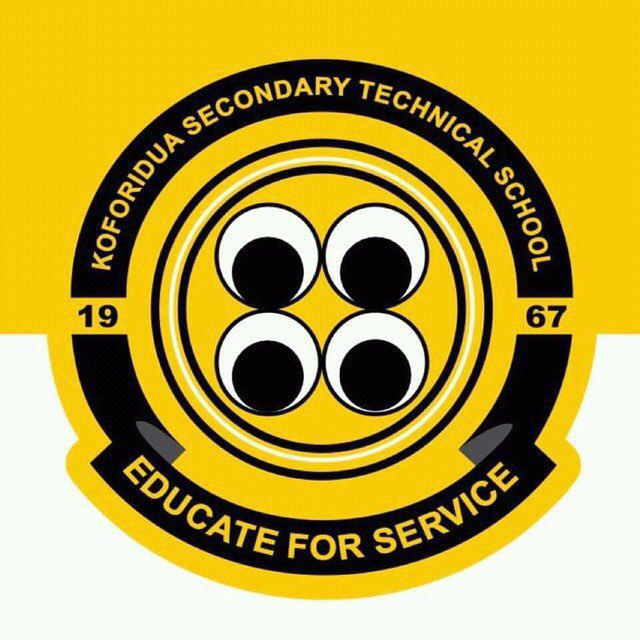
- Sectech Insignia

Location
- P. O. Box 436; Koforidua; Ghana
- Coordinates: 6°04′43″N 0°15′31″W

Information
- Type: co-educational boarding school
- Motto: Educate for Service
- Religious affiliation: Non-denominational Christian
- Established: 1967 (57 years ago)
- Founder: Dr. Kwame Nkrumah
- School board: Board of Governors
- School district: New Juabeng South Municipal
- Authority: Ministry of Education
- Oversight: Ghana Education Service
- Headmaster: Mr. Ofori Antwi
- Staff: 120 teachers
- Grades: Forms 1–3 (Grades 6-12)
- Gender: Mixed
- Age range: 14 to 19 years
- Enrollment: c. 2200+
- Language: English
- Campus: Galloway
- Campus type: Residential garden-style setting
- Houses: 4
- Colors: Yellow and Black
- Slogan: Akan: MMARIMA MMA Abusua Kɛseɛ!!
- Song: Mmarima Mma Arise and Shine!
- Mascot: OWL
- Nickname: EASTERN VARSITY
- USNWR ranking: Grade A
- Alumni: BARIMA BA (SECTECHAN)
- Courses: General Science; Technical; General Arts; STEM
- Website: koforiduashts.edu.gh

Koforidua Secondary Technical School, also called KSTS or SECTECH, is secondary technical School located in Koforidua in the Eastern Region of Ghana. As of December 2011, the school had over 2200, students.

== History ==
The school was established in 1967 by Dr. Kwame Nkrumah. It was the second secondary technical school after Ghana Secondary Technical School (GSTS) in Takoradi.

The school began as an all-boys school. Girls were later admitted for the first time in 1991, but only made up 5% of the student population in 2001. Till date the population of girls has not improved, therefore many people including students think it should be made a permanent all-boys school. The school taught mainly General Science and technical after its establishment but eventually added other courses over the years as it goes by. The school has a local rivalry with its neighbouring top schools Pope John Senior High School, Minor Seminary and Ghana Senior High School, Koforidua.

== Facilities ==
The Old Students association, named after the school slogan Mmarima Mma, began constructing a ¢7,000,000 assembly hall in 2018. The school has four houses and two other houses are under construction. The school has the nicest dining hall in Koforidua.

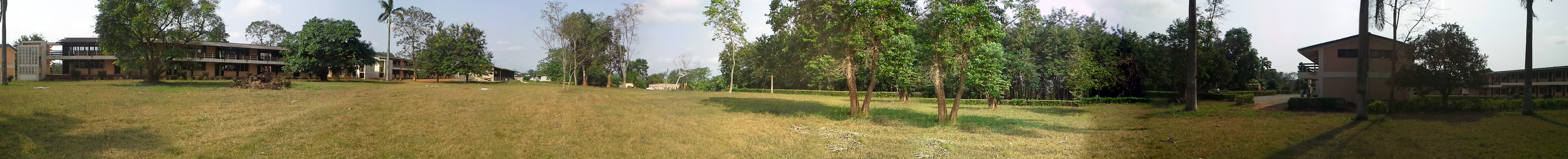
KSTS Panorama

== Academics ==
Academically, the school is well-noted. The school is classed among the Class A schools in Ghana.

In 2011 the first four-year program badge of the school set an unprecedented record in making the highest passes in the West African Senior High School Council Examination (WASSCE) with a maximum of 200 students getting A+ in all eight examinations. 488 students were registered for the WASSCE and 485 students passed in eight subjects. Making the school the 2nd best in the Eastern Region after St. Peters Senior High School. The school has made great improvements throughout the years. In 2012, the results were impressive bringing out more than 16 students scoring 8 A's in the WASSCE examinations and many more number of 7 A's.

== Notable alumni ==
- Emmanuel Ekow Amoako
- Solomon Quainoo — Ghanaian pilot
- DJ Aroma — Ghanaian DJ
- Vision DJ — Ghanaian DJ
- Prince Tagoe — Ghanaian footballer
- Scofray Nana Yaw Yeboah — Ghanaian writer
- Wutah Kobby — Ghanaian musician
- Samuel Nii Odai — vice chancellor, Accra Technical University
- Samuel Nuamah Donkor — politician and former MP for New Juaben North Constituency, former Minister of Health, former Ashanti regional minister
- Elder Mireku — gospel musician
- Kingsley Kojo Antwi — Ghanaian author and fine art photographer

== In Pictures ==
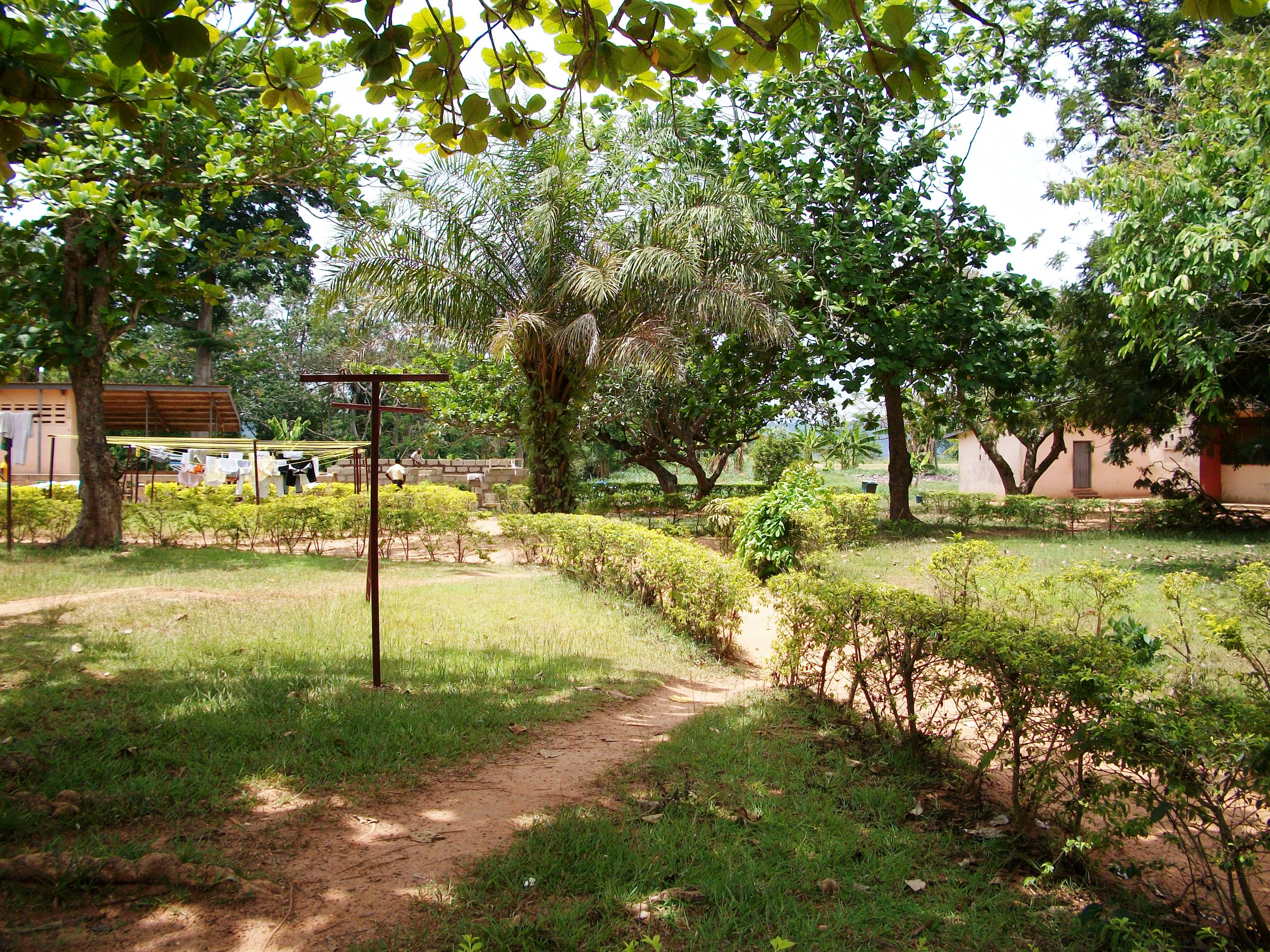
Conducive campus environment

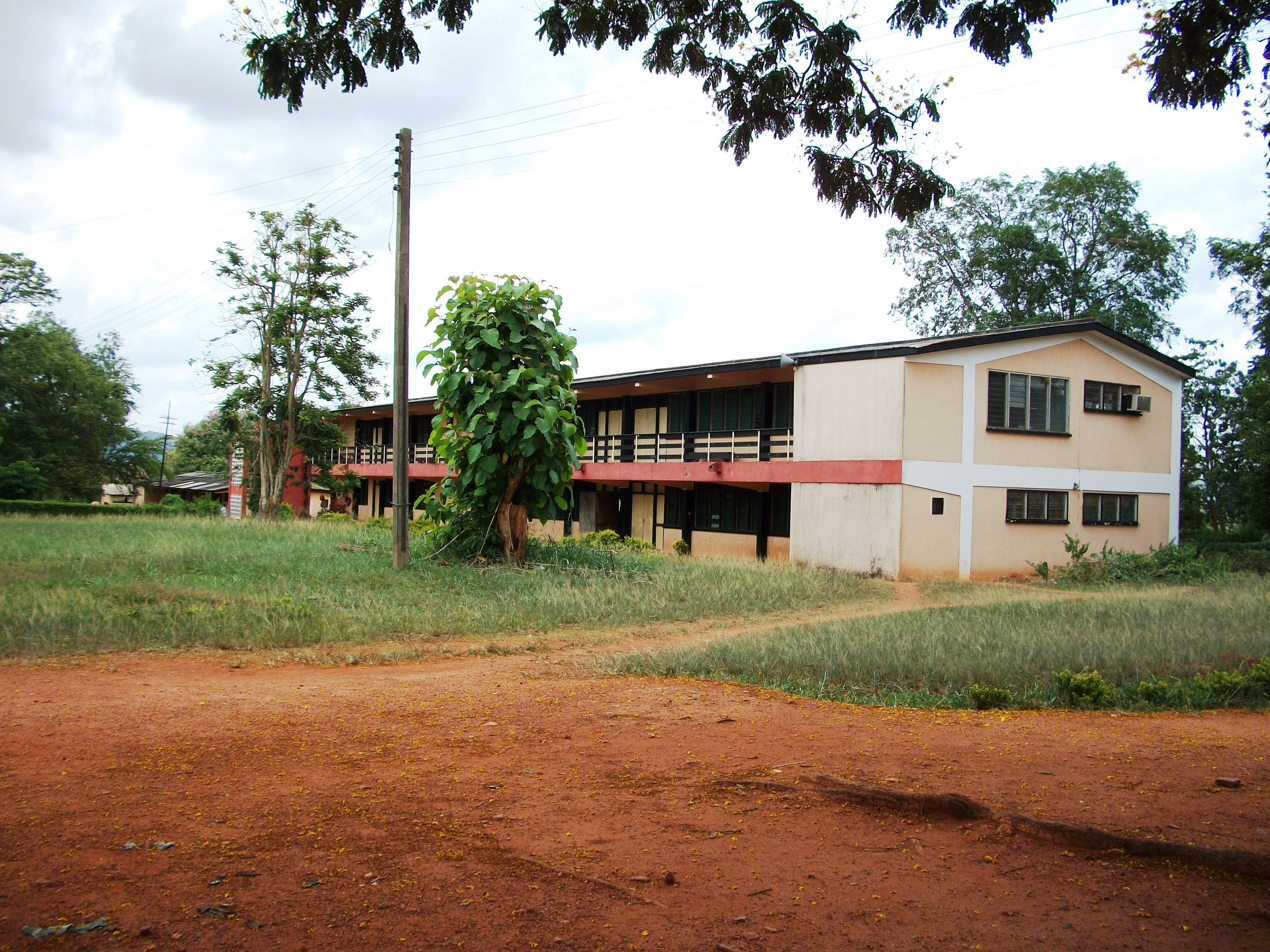
Science Laboratory Block

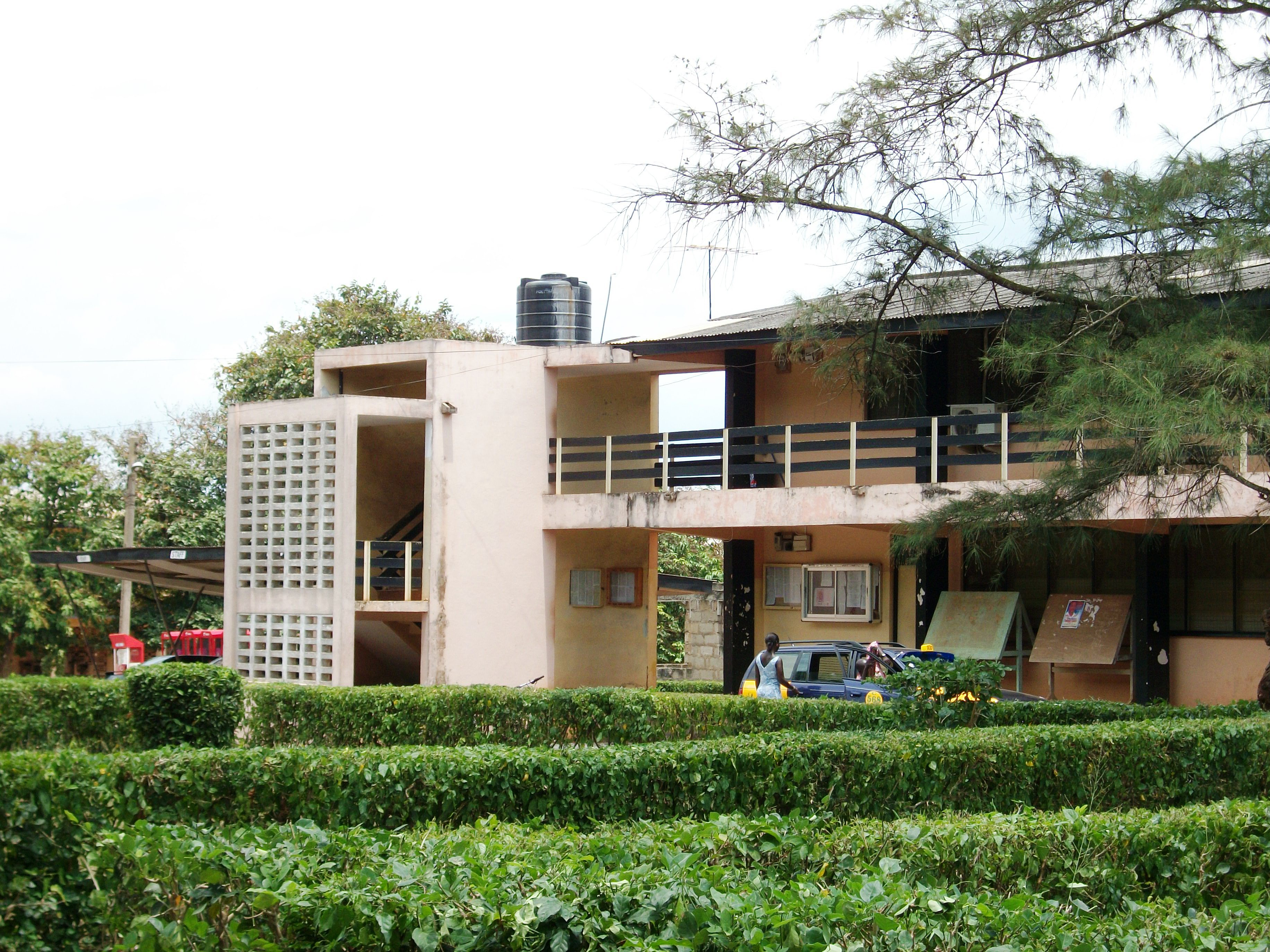
Administration Block
