= Odorgonno Senior High School =

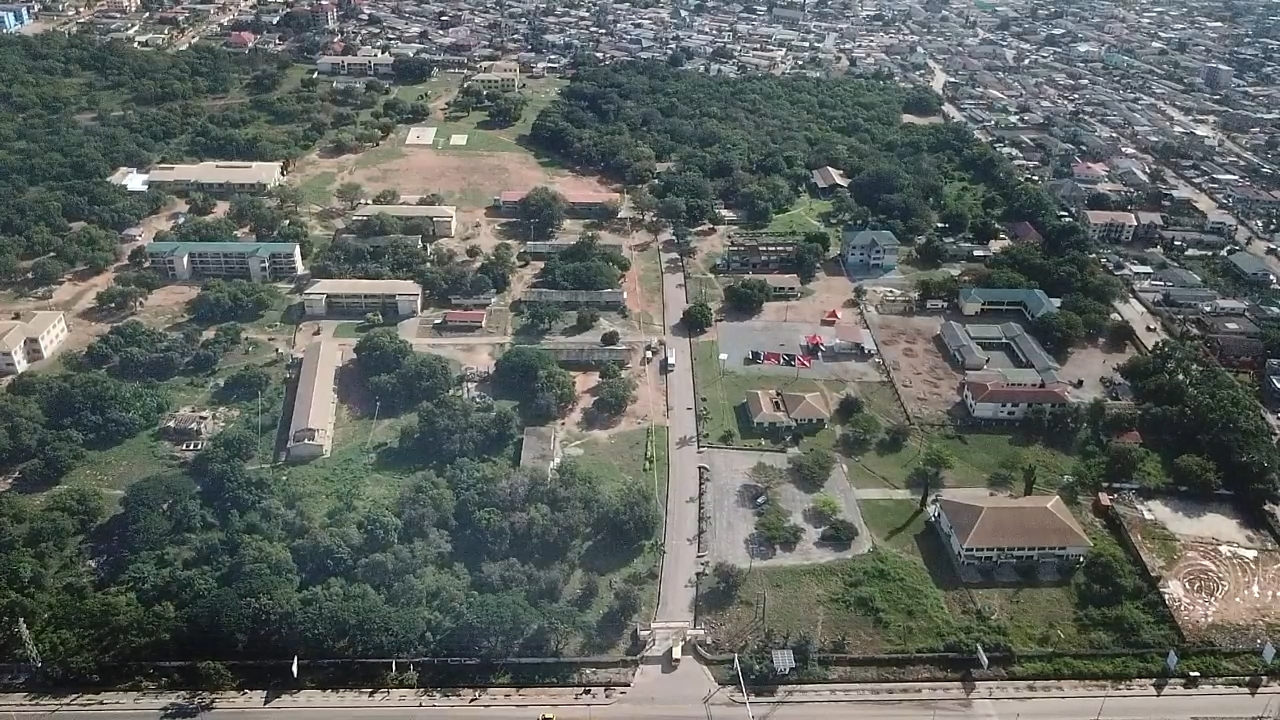
- Awoshie; Ghana

Information
- Motto: Nobis Nitendum est (Ours is to Strive)
- Established: 1940
- Founder: Joseph Thomas Leigh
- Staff: 203
- Gender: co-educational
- Enrollment: 3,481 (2025)
- Website: ossa.edu.gh

Odorgonno Senior High School (Great OSSA) is a Ghanaian based senior secondary school. Its motto is Nobis Nitendum est, which is Latin and means Ours is to Strive. As of 2017, it has 2,671 students and 183 staff, including 53 non-teaching staff. On July 1, 2023, the school's academic prowess was showcased as it emerged victorious in the National Science and Maths Quiz (NSMQ) regional qualifiers, alongside other esteemed institutions like Ashaiman SHS, Labone SHS, and Achimota School. The former Head Prefect/SRC President of Odorgonno Senior High School was Master Humphrey Nyarko. His tenure began after he was declared winner in June 2024. He was assisted by Samuel Yeku(Deputy Headboy). The Girls Prefects were Miss Esther Fosu(Head Girl) and Miss Chantelle Duah(Deputy). The former sports prefect was Kelvin Nyameyie Asante

== History ==
The school was established as a boys' day school in 1940 on the crest of the Odaw River at Adabraka in the Greater Accra Region by Joseph Thomas Leigh and three other teachers at the Accra High School. It was taken into the government system and moved to Awoshie, which is its current location, in 1990. In 1993, it became co-educational, began boarding in 2007, and gained model school status on 25 November 2008.

== Notable alumni ==
- Reginald Ansa-Asamoah, academic and Pro Vice-Chancellor of KNUST
- Lawrence Tetteh, Renowned Evangelist and Founder of Worldwide Miracle Outreach
- George Aggudey, Politician
- Richie Agyemfra-Kumi, Politician
- K.G. Osei Bonsu, lawyer and politician
- Fameye, Musician
- Chris Tsui Hesse, cinematographer, filmmaker, film administrator and photographer
- Bill Okyere Marshall, Playwright
- Medikal, Musician
- Walter Onnoghen, Chief Justice of Nigeria
- Bob Pixel, Photographer
- Sheikh I. C. Quaye, Politician
- Fredrick Percival Segbefia, Politician
- Mohammed Adjei Sowah, Mayor of Accra.
- Comedian Waris, Ghanaian comedian
- Guy Warren, Musician, best known as the inventor of Afro-jazz
- Incredible Zigi, Dancer
