= Ruff n Smooth =

Ghanaian musical duo

Ruff N Smooth
- Origin: Accra, Ghana
- Genres: Afrobeats; Afropop
- Years active: 2008–present
- Label: Hitz In Motion Records
- Members: Clement Foh Baah; Ricky Nana Agyemang

Ruff n Smooth is a Ghanaian-based music group made up of Ruff/Bullet (Ricky Nana Agyemang) & Smooth/Ahkan (Clement Baah Foh). Although both have been on the music scene for a while, it was not till they formed an alliance that they both gained prominence. Prior to this alliance, Bullet was formerly known as Etuo Aboba (meaning Bullet) and Ahkan known as Osrane (meaning Moon).

== Music career ==
Their debut album as a group has the song "Swagger". They have released two new singles titled "Sex Machine" and "Azingele". Ruff n Smooth won the Ghana Music Group of the Year category in 2010 at the City People Entertainment Awards in Lagos and were nominated for Afro Pop Song of the Year at the Ghana Music Awards.

== Separation ==
Artiste manager and songwriter Ricky Nana Agyemang, known in the music circles as Bullet, has revealed that hip-life music group Ruff N Smooth, which he was part of, is dead.

He said though music fans are calling for the reunion of the group, he is not ready to reunite with his colleague and former group member, Clement Baah Foh, known also as Ahkan. Speaking on Hitz FM, Bullet said, “Ahkan proposed that we split so we both could pursue solo careers which I agreed to.”

In his reaction, Ahkan, who spoke with Zion Felix in an interview, accused Bullet of being the brain behind the collapse of the group. According to him, Bullet shifted all his attention to the first artiste signed onto his label Rufftown Records, the late Ebony Reigns, instead of the group. He added that Bullet did not inform him about his decision to manage Ebony Reigns on a full-time basis, stressing that Bullet's continuous neglect of the group led to its collapse. Akhan revealed that he never knew the group does not exist until Bullet said in some interviews that the group had collapsed.

The manager of the group, Theophilus Amoah Baah, in an interview with BEATWAVES, confirmed that it was the decision of the members of the group to embark on individual solo projects to develop their skills.

He pointed out that sometimes when individuals in a group embark on a solo projects, it allows one to express himself well and helps to explore and develop his talents. The group made a lot of impacts between 2009 and 2012, topped charts after the release of a number of hit songs such as ‘Swagger’, ‘Sex Machine’ and many others.

It won the Ghana Music Group of the Year Award in 2010at the City People Entertainment Awards in Lagos and was nominated for Afro-Pop Song of the Year at the Ghana Music Awards same year.

Currently, Bullet is working on his label RuffTown Records which manages Wendy Shay, while Akhan has been a solo artiste since 2015.
