= Richie Agyemfra-Kumi =

Ghanaian politician

MP for Akropong
- In office 7 January 1993 – 6 January 1997
- President: Jerry John Rawlings

Personal details
- Born: 2 December 1952 (age 73) Akropong, Eastern Region, Ghana
- Party: National Democratic Congress
- Education: Odorgonno Senior High School; Nungua Senior High School; Accra Academy
- Occupation: Politician
- Profession: Business executive

Richie Agyemfra-Kumi (born 2 December 1952) is a Ghanaian politician and a member of the First Parliament of the fourth Republic representing the Akropong constituency in Eastern Region of Ghana.

== Early life and education ==
Kumi was born on 2 December 1952 at Akropong in the Eastern Region of Ghana. He attended the Odorgonno Secondary School and Nungua Secondary School, and the Accra Academy where he obtained his GCE Advanced Level (A-Level) certificate.

== Politics ==
Kumi was first elected into Parliament on the ticket of the National Democratic Congress for the Akropong Constituency in the Eastern Region of Ghana during the 1992 Ghanaian parliamentary election. The Akropong constituency was holding by Kwasi Akoto a member of the People's National Party(PNP) in 1979. He was defeated in the 1996 Ghanaian General Elections by Agyare Koi Larbi who polled 49% out of the total 100% valid votes cast.

== Career ==
Kumi is a business executive by profession. He was a former member of Parliament for the Akropong constituency in the Eastern Region of Ghana. He was the executive director of Dawu Youngsters Football Club, Larteh Youngsters Football Club, and Ritchfield Procurement Services.

== Personal life ==
He is a Christian.
