= Bullet (musician) =

Ghanaian musical artist

Bullet (Musician)
- Born: Ricky Nana Agyemang; 17 November; Ghana
- Citizenship: Ghanaian
- Occupation: Musician
- Organization: Rufftown Records

Ricky Nana Agyemang, also known as Bullet is a Ghanaian Musician, Songwriter, Artiste Manager and a record Label owner. He was a member of the music group Ruff n Smooth with Ahkan.

== Life and career ==
=== Earlier career ===
Bullet started his musical career as Etuo Aboba (meaning "Bullet" in Twi). He released an album under this name titled Wo Beko Wo Maame Ho. In 2008, he formed the group Ruff n Smooth with Ahkan. The duo released several songs including "Swagger", "Sex Machine", "Azingele", "Dance for Me", and "Naija Baby".

== Record label ==
Bullet is the founder and CEO of RuffTown Records. His first signed artist was the late Ebony Reigns. He later signed Danny Beat, Brella, Ms Forson, Wendy Shay, Fantana, and Ray James to the label.

== Awards and nominations ==
Year	Nominee/ work	Award	Results
2010	Ruff n Smooth	City People Entertainment Awards "Ghana Music Group of the Year"	won
2010	Ruff n Smooth	Ghana Music Awards "Afro Pop Song of the Year"	Nominated
2018	Bullet	Ghana Music Awards "Songwriter of the Year"	won
