= Samuel Nii Odai =

Ghanaian academic

- Nii Odai
- Born: Tema, Ghana
- Occupation: Vice Chancellor

Samuel Nii Odai is a Ghanaian professor of hydraulics and water resources, and a serving vice chancellor of Accra Technical University. He is a Commonwealth Academic Fellow, and a recipient of the National Best Research Scientist Gold Award for water, environment and sanitation.

== Early life and education ==
Professor Odai was born in Tema where he attended the Twedaase Primary (the first primary school in Tema) and Middle Schools. He proceeded to the Koforidua Secondary Technical School where he sat for the General Certificate Examination (GCE) Ordinary and the Advanced Levels.

He then moved to the Hohai University where he graduated with BEng in irrigation and water conservancy engineering (in civil engineering). He obtained his MSc and PhD degrees at the Tokyo University of Agriculture and Technology. He obtained his MSc in 1996 and PhD in 1999, specializing in the area of computational hydraulics (water resources engineering).

== Career ==
Odai is the current vice chancellor of Accra Technical University. He had his national service as a science and math teacher at the Tema Technical Institute. He was appointed a lecturer in the Department of Civil Engineering of the Kwame Nkrumah University of Science and Technology, KNUST in 1999, then promoted to senior lecturer in 2002, to associate professor in 2007 and to Full Professor in 2012.

He has served as examinations officer of the School of Engineering (now College of Engineering), deputy manager of the Water Supply and Environmental Sanitation Project, manager of the Water Resource and Environmental Sanitation Project at the Kwame Nkrumah University of Science and Technology. He is the founding director of the WASCAL Graduate Research Program in Climate Change and Land Use. Until his appointment as the vice chancellor, he was serving as the pro vice chancellor at the Kwame Nkrumah University of Science and Technology.

He is the international director of the UK-based Welcome Trust-sponsored project under the theme “Scientists Networked for Outcomes in Water and Sanitation” (SNOWS).

== Awards and publications ==
Odai has been inducted as a Fellow of the Ghana Academy of Arts and Sciences. He was awarded the best research scientists at the First Ghana Research Science Congress under the theme “Water, Sanitation and Environment: Securing our Future through Science”. He has many publications to his credit.
