= Comedian Waris =

Ghanaian comedian and actor

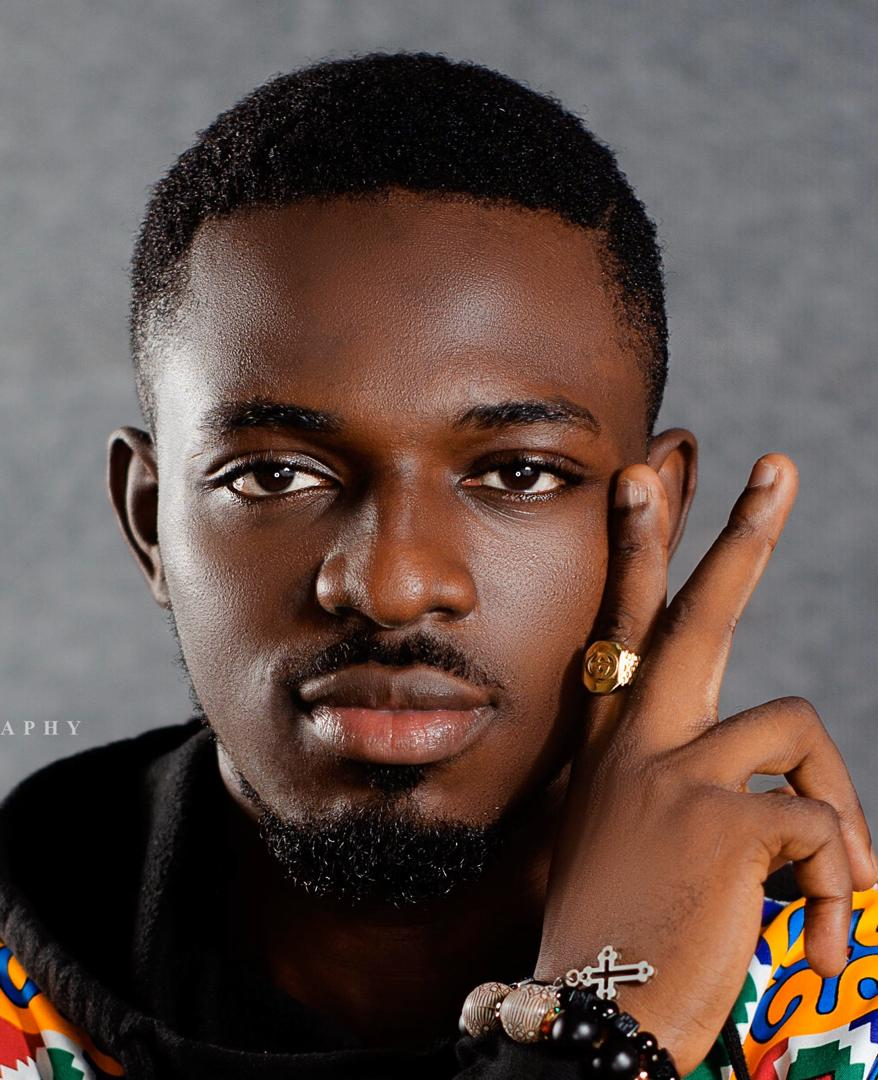
- Born: Abdul Waris Umaru
- Education: Odorgonno Senior High School
- Occupation: Stand up comedian | skit maker | businessman
- Years active: 2015–present
- Awards: 2018 Most Influential Comedian

Abdul Waris Umaru, known as Comedian Waris, is a Ghanaian comedian, actor and a content creator.

== Early life ==
Comedian Waris was born in Kumasi; his father is Umaru Ibrahim. He had his primary education at Kingsway School and went on to Odorgonno Senior High School. His tertiary education was at Top Media School where he graduated in 2014.

== Career ==
Waris worked as an intern at both Top FM and Rainbow Radio as sound engineer in 2014 and later moved to Channel5 TV in the same year. In 2015 he worked at ecstasy entertainment as a stand-up comedian and personal assistant to award-winning comedian DKB. He established the Waris Foundation, which occasionally donates to people living in the streets in Ghana.

== Influences ==
Waris has cited Kevin Hart, DKB, OB Amponsah, Lekzy de Comic, Clemento Suarez, Snoop Dogg as his influences.

== Filmography ==
- Akwabaa

=== Online skits ===
- Don't Leave Me Challenge
- Fear Women
- Accra Mall Love
- Journey to Benin
- Adventures of Waris
- Obinim Shoe Challenge
- Don't Steal From Efo
- Breast of No Nation
- False Prophet (comedy)
- Mobile Phone Yawa
- Something Must Kill A Man
- Condition Of Nose Mask
- The Best Comedian In Ghana - Comedian Waris

== Movie Series ==
- Agenda Boys
- Fufu funu

== Videography ==
- Sista afia - Party
- Fameye - Noting I Get
- Fameye - Destiny
- Ogidi brown - Favor Us

== Discography ==
- Agenda Boys ft. Wutah Kobby & Exodus Links

== Awards ==
Awards and Nominations by Comedian Waris
Year	Award	Body	Result	Ref
2020	Student Favorite Comedian Of the Year	Ghana Students Award	Nominated	
2020	Best Skit Act Of The Year	COPO Award	Won	
2019	Best Comedian	Ghana Entertainment Award USA	Nominated	
2018	Most Influential Comedian	High School Excellence Award	Won	
