= Vision DJ =

Ghanaian DJ and media personality

- Also known as: DJ Vision or Vision DJ (Knack Dem)
- Born: Francis Essah Aboagye; April 8, 1987 (age 39); Accra, Ghana
- Origin: Accra, Ghana
- Genres: Highlife, Hip hop, Afro-pop, R&B, Afrobeat
- Occupations: DJ, artist DJ, singer
- Instrument: Turntables
- Years active: 2008–present
- Website: Official Website

Vision DJ (born 8 April 1987), known in private life as Francis Essah Aboagye, is a Ghanaian radio, event, artist DJ and singer who co-host the "Ryse ‘n Shyne" at Y107.9FM.

== Career ==
=== Beginning ===
Francis Essah Aboagye was born on 8 April 1987 in Accra. At age 18 years old, Vision started his deejay days during his secondary school years at Koforidua Senior High Technical School. Following completion, he attended Central University College in Tema, where he was a banking and finance graduate. He continued pursuing his career in the music industry throughout college, and played on Vibe FM(now Life FM) from 2007 to 2009, before joining YFM.

== Music career ==
Vision DJ released one of his singles in the latter part of November 2016. Entitled Grind which features A.I., the single enjoyed massive airplay after its release, which brought him into the music limelight.

== Concerts and Radio ==
Vision has shared platforms playing at 020live concerts and in the VIP ‘Red Room’ at the Vodafone Ghana Music Awards. Vision DJ has shared the stage with the likes of Trey Songz, Ludacris, Fabolous, Red Cafe, D’banj, Neato C, Ice Prince and WizKid as DJ. In 2013, he was an In house Dj at the Big Brother Africa event. He is the official DJ for dancehall act Kaakie.

Since 2009, Vision has rocked the weekly morning drive with Ms Naa on Y107.9FM's Ryse ‘n Shyne. His famous ‘Loud ‘n Lyve’ mixes kept his listeners locked in every morning.

== Major concerts ==
- ‘Wave Club Tour’ with Joey B and Pappy Kojo (WAVE Concert- 2017)
- Christmas Show (Dejavu Night Club, Liberia -2012)
- Harare International Festival of Arts (Zimbabwe – 2015)
- HIFA Music Festival in Zimbabwe
- Zambia International trade fair (Ndola, Zambia – 2015)

== Awards ==
Vision DJ awards and nominations
Awards and nominations
Award	Wins	Nominations
Ghana DJ Awards	3	0
Vodafone Ghana Music Awards	0	1
Ghana Music Honours	0	1
Ghana Entertainment Awards	0	1

Totals (Note: Certain award groups do not simply award one winner. They acknowledge several different recipients, have runners-up, and have third place. Since this is a specific recognition and is different from losing an award, runner-up mentions are considered wins in this award tally. For simplification and to avoid errors, each award in this list has been presumed to have had a prior nomination.)
- Wins: 3
- Nominations: 3

Year	Nominee / work	Award	Result
2013	Himself	Discovery DJ of the Year	Won
2017	Himself	Best DJ and Artist Collaboration of the Year	Won
2017	Himself	DJ Song of the Year – Grind	Won

=== Vodafone Ghana Music Awards ===
Year	Nominee / work	Award	Result
2017	Himself	Afropop Song of the Year-Grind	Nominated

=== Ghana Music Honours ===
Year	Nominee / work	Award	Result
2017	Himself	Best DJ Honour	Nominated

=== Ghana Entertainment Awards ===
Year	Nominee / work	Award	Result
2017	Himself	Best DJ of the Year	Nominated

== Discography ==
=== Major singles ===
- Wobeba featuring EL Produced by Guilty Beatz
- This Year featuring Mr Eazi Produced by Otee Beatz
- Grind featuring A.I Produced by Otee Beatz
- Double Trouble featuring Sarkodie and King Promise Produced by Kuvie
- Like December featuring Samini Produced by Juls
- Chuku featuring VVIP & Miyaki Produced by Guilty Beatz

== Videography ==
Year	Title	Director	Ref
2016	Grind	Nana Kofi Asihene	
2017	Like December (with Samini)	Yaw Skyface	
2017	Double Trouble (with Sarkodie x King Promise)	Lex Mccarthy	
