= Fredrick Percival Segbefia =

Ghanaian politician (born 1931)

Hon. Fredrick Percival Segbefia

Member of parliament for Avenor constituency
- In office 1 October 1969 – 13 January 1972

Personal details
- Party: National Alliance of Liberals
- Education: Leeds University
- Occupation: Politician
- Profession: Barrister, Solicitor and a Businessman

Fredrick Percival Segbefia (born 8 September 1931) is a Ghanaian politician who was a member of the first parliament of the second republic of Ghana representing Avenor constituency in the Volta Region of Ghana under the membership of the National Alliance Liberals (NAL).

== Early life and education ==
Fredrick Percival Segbefia was born on 8 September 1931. He attended Odorgonno Senior High School, Huddersfield Technical College and Leeds University. where he obtained a Bachelor of Laws.

== Career and politics ==
Segbefia worked as a barrister, solicitor and businessman before going into Parliament. He began his political career in 1969 when he became the parliamentary candidate for to represent his constituency Avenor in the Volta Region of Ghana prior to the commencement of the 1969 Ghanaian parliamentary election.

He was sworn into the First Parliament of the Second Republic of Ghana on 1 October 1969, after being pronounced winner at the 1969 Ghanaian election held on 26 August 1969. and his tenure of office ended on 13 January 1972.

== Personal life ==
Segbefia is a Christian.
