= Wutah Kobby =

Ghanaian Singer / Songwriter

- Birth name: Daniel Nyarko Morris
- Born: 21 December 1982 (age 42); Korle bu, Accra
- Origin: Kwahu-Obomeng, Eastern Region, Ghana
- Genres: Highlife; Reggae; Hip hop; Gospel; Acoustic music; Afro Country Music
- Occupation(s): Singer, songwriter, entrepreneur
- Years active: 2004–present
- Labels: G-string entertainment, NKZ music, Currently – Wutah Kobby Music

Wutah kobby is the stage name of Daniel Nyarko Morris , a Ghanaian singer and songwriter from Eastern Region of Ghana and also CEO of Wutah Kobby Music.

== Life and music career ==
Christened Daniel Morris Nyarko 21 December 1982 and known in the showbiz cycles as Wutah Kobby, he hails from Kwahu-Obomeng in the Eastern Region of the Republic of Ghana.

Bred in the capital city Accra, he had his secondary education at Koforidua Senior High Technical School and later to the Takoradi Polytechnic where he was awarded HND in Building Engineering.

Wutah Kobby teamed up with two others to form the group to contest in the maiden Nescafe African Revelation which they came out 2nd. Currently with three albums "Anamontuo", "Burning Desire" and "Selfless Bliss" to his credit, the ace singer shares the two former albums with Peevee.

Also, he is currently the vice president of the Ghana Association of Songwriters.

== Discography ==
Studio albums

- Anamontuo (2004)
- Burning Desire (2008)
- Selfless Bliss (2015) – Solo Project
- Abokobi Album (2021)

Anamontuo (meaning Exodus) – the maiden album was released in 2004 and produced hit songs like "Goosy-gander", "Adonko", "Big dreams" and many hit songs.

Burning Desire – the second album as a duo was released in late 2008 and also had the hit song "Kotosa".

Selfless Bliss – the maiden album by Wutah Kobby as a solo artiste was released in and produced hits like "Tsotsoo", "Ambulance", and "Odo Yewu" with the latter two featuring Sarkodie and Kwabena Kwabena respectively.

Abokobi Album - This Album features artist like Medikal, Guru, KelvynBoy, Fameye, Comedian Waris, Angla Escoba, Kwesi Swat etc. Abokobi is a 18 track album which consist of musics like Mattress, So Far So Good, Boosue, Ade dede, Gold, kokoti, Set You free, Odo Colour, etc.

== Awards and nominations ==
=== Bass Awards ===
Year	Nominee / work	Award	Result
2015	Himself		
2015	Himself	Song Writer of the Year	Won
2015	Himself	Best Reggae Video of the Year	Won
2015	Himself	Best Male Vocalist of the Year	Won
2015	Himself	Reggae Song of the Year	Won

=== Ghana Music Awards UK ===
Year	Nominee / work	Award	Result
2018	Himself		
2018	Himself	High Life Song of the Year	Won
2018	Himself	Best Group of the Year	Won
2018	Himself	High Life Song of the Year	Won

=== Vodafone-Ghana Music Awards ===
Year	Nominee / work	Award	Result
2006	Himself	Record of the Year	Won
2006	Himself	Best reggae song of the year	Won
2010	Himself	Best High Life Song of the Year	Won
2010	Himself	Best Reggae Song of the Year	Won
2018	Himself	Best Group of the Year	Won

=== Ghana Music Awards USA ===
Year	Nominee / work	Award	Result
2018	Himself	Best Group of the Year	Won
