= Ebony Reigns =

Ghanaian female dancehall artist (1997–2018)

- Born: Priscilla Opoku-Kwarteng; 16 February 1997; Kumasi, Ghana
- Died: 8 February 2018 (aged 20)
- Genres: Dancehall; hiplife
- Occupation: Singer
- Instrument: Vocals
- Years active: 2015–2018
- Label: Ruff Town

Priscilla Opoku-Kwarteng (16 February 1997 – 8 February 2018), known by her stage name Ebony Reigns, was a Ghanaian singer known for her hit songs "Poison" and "Kupe". Ebony was discovered by Ogee The MC for Bullet from Ruff n Smooth, and was the first Ghanaian female musician to win Artiste of the Year Award at the Ghana Music Awards.

== Early life and education ==
Ebony Reigns hailed as the 'Original 90s Bad Gyal', was affably known as Nana Heemaa (Ohemaa) by her close relatives, in Dansoman, a suburb of Accra. Her parents are Nana Poku Kwarteng and Beatrice Oppong Marthin. She was raised in the urban areas of Accra but hailed from the Brong Ahafo region.

She started her basic education at Seven Great Princess Academy in Dansoman, Accra, followed by a high school education at Methodist Girls High School at Mamfe in the Akuapim North District of the Eastern Region, Ghana, though she did not graduate. She quit high school in pursuit of her music career.

== Career ==
Ebony was discovered by musician and entrepreneur Bullet from Ruff n Smooth and was signed to his RuffTown Records label. She came out with her first single, "Dancefloor", in December 2015, with a video and audio release. The song became a radio hit, landing her a nomination for the "unsung" category at the 2016 Ghana Music Awards.

In March 2016 Ebony released her major hit single "Kupe". She was signed to Ruff Town Records and Midas Touch Inc, where she worked closely with Dj Shiwaawa, as her personal DJ. Ebony's hit songs such as "Poison", "Sponsor", and "Hustle", also garnered significant airplay and charted high on music charts in Ghana. One of her most impactful hits was the song "Maame Hw3," which focused on the issue of domestic violence, further amplified by the song's music video.

== Death ==
Ebony Reigns was killed instantly in a traffic collision on 8 February 2018 whilst returning from Sunyani to Accra after a visit to her mother. Her jeep collided head-on with a bus on the Sunyani-Kumasi Highway. She died eight days before her 21st birthday and one day prior to her scheduled music tour in Europe. Her assistant and longtime friend Franklina Yaa Nkansah Kuri and soldier Atsu Vondee were also killed in the fatal accident. The only survivor of the crash was the driver named Okoh Pinehas Chartey, who resides at Teshie.

Her final funeral rites were held at the forecourt of the state house, Accra, and she was buried at Osu cemetery on Saturday, 24 March 2018. In preparation for the funeral, the late Ebony's family received a lot of donations from prominent personalities, government and private institutions. Some of the top donors at the funeral include Nana Akufo-Addo, Ibrahim Mahama, and John Mahama, among others.

=== Controversies surrounding her death ===
After Reigns died, controversies became rampant and people were divided. There were those that believed that it could have been prevented if roads were properly constructed and adequately lighted. Apparently, the Mankranso road she was traveling on that fateful night was in a very bad state and to some critics, that influenced the accident. Others believe her death is an Act of God and that though it was harsh, it could not have been prevented. Still, others attribute her death to what they consider her racy lifestyle and several pastors came out after her death to say that they had prophesied that Reigns would die if she did not change her "lifestyle".

Dr. Lawrence Tetteh, a renowned pastor in Ghana, also spoke about how some musicians and businesses were taking advantage of Ebony Reigns' death to make profits. Ghana Textile Printing Limited (GTP), for example, is set to manufacture newly customized cloths with some of Ebony's songs such as 'Aseda' and 'Maame Hw3’ for naming ceremonies and funerals, respectively. He insisted that he spent more money on the funeral than anyone and did not appreciate the fact that some companies were making money from her death. This sparked a lot of controversy because some people believed that his comments were not necessary as a pastor and took to social media to express their views. Ebony's death also raised all forms of prophecies concerning deaths of other artists, a typical example is Shatta Wale, known to be Ghana's number one dancehall artist. A pastor revealed Shatta Wale was going to die before 25 December 2018, but added, something can be made to stop it. Fans who believed in Ebony's prophecies wished the dancehall king not to die but the artist posted videos on social media threatening to burn churches if he lives after the said date. As to relate Ebony's death to the prophecies or to consider it a normal accident is unknown, each and everyone has the right to believe in what his/her heart directed him/her.

== Aftermath ==
After Ebony Reigns died, some celebrities in Ghana, Sarkodie and Stonebwoy started road safety campaigns to reduce the number of accidents on the roads. On the exact one year after her death, most Ghanaians showed love and concern for the musical artist by posting condolences and pictures of her on social media. Sarkodie has released a song titled "Wake Up Call" to address some causes of road accidents and what to do to reduce them. The song which features singer Benji urges the government to fix bad roads and also enjoins the police to enforce traffic regulations. The Ministry of Tourism, Arts & Culture will also embark on a road safety awareness campaign to ensure sanity on the roads and save more lives. In remembrance of her and commemoration of the 3rd year of her death, her label released "John 8:7" which featured current label front runner Wendy Shay.

== Legacy and influence ==
Ebony was reported to be among the first female artists in Ghana to release multiple major singles within a single year. Her stage performances and distinctive style contributed to public discussions on gender roles and women’s empowerment in Ghana.

Every year, on the anniversary of Ebony Reigns' passing, her family visits her gravesite at Osu Cemetery to offer prayers, lay wreaths, and spend time in remembrance. Eight days later, the family of Ebony, led by her father Nana Opoku Kwarteng, organizes a yearly Memorial Birthday Celebration in honor of the late musician. As part of the Memorial Birthday Celebration, jollof rice, one of Ebony's specialties, is served to honor her legacy.

== Awards and nominations ==
Year	Event	Prize	Recipient / nominated work	Result	Source
2018	Vodafone Ghana Music Awards	Artist of the Year	Herself	Won	
2018	Vodafone Ghana Music Awards	Afro Pop Song of the Year (Sponsor)	Herself	Won	
2018	Vodafone Ghana Music Awards	Album of the Year	Bonyfied	Won	
2017	Merit Awards 2017	Most Influential Artiste	Herself	Nominated	
2017	Bass Awards 2017	Artiste of the Year	Herself	Won	
2017	People's Celebrity Awards 2017	Favourite Female Musician	Herself	Won	
2016	Vodafone Ghana Music Awards	Unsung Artiste of the Year	Herself	Nominated	
2016	4syte Music Video Awards	Best Female Video and New Discovery	Kupe	Won	
2016	Jigwe Awards	Discovery of the Year	Herself	Nominated	
2016	Bass Awards	Best Dancehall Video	Dance Floor	Won	
2016	Bass Awards	New Discovery	Herself	Nominated	

== Discography ==
Studio albums

- Bonyfied (2017)
