= Reginald Ansa-Asamoah =

Ghanaian pharmacologist and academic

Reginald Tetteh Ansa-Asamoah
- Born: Reginald Tetteh Ansa-Asamoah; 28 July 1938; Mampong-Akwapim, Gold Coast (now Ghana)
- Died: 13 April 1994 (aged 56); Kumasi, Ghana
- Citizenship: Ghanaian
- Education: Kwame Nkrumah University of Science and Technology; University of Sydney
- Scientific career
- Fields: Pharmacology
- Institutions: Kwame Nkrumah University of Science and Technology; Council for Scientific and Industrial Research

Reginald Tetteh Ansa-Asamoah (28 July 1938 – 13 April 1994) was a Ghanaian pharmacologist and academic who served as Pro-Vice-Chancellor of the Kwame Nkrumah University of Science and Technology, Kumasi from 1991 until his death in office in 1994.

== Early life and education ==
Ansa-Asamoah was born on 28 July 1938 at Mampong-Akwapim in the Gold Coast (now Ghana). He attended Odorgonno Secondary School and Accra Academy before enrolling at the Kwame Nkrumah University of Science and Technology in 1961, where he obtained a Bachelor of Pharmacy degree in 1964 and a Master of Pharmacy degree in 1967.

He later obtained a PhD from the University of Sydney in 1983.

== Career ==
Ansa-Asamoah began as a research assistant in the Alkaloidal Unit of the Council for Scientific and Industrial Research (CSIR) before joining the Department of Pharmacology at University of Science and Technology, Kumasi as a lecturer in 1968. He rose through the academic ranks to become Associate Professor of Pharmacology in 1985. He held several administrative roles within the university, including Head of the Department of Pharmacology in 1982, Deputy Vice-Dean from 1983 to 1984 and later Vice-Dean of the Faculty of Pharmacy from 1985 to 1988, before becoming Pro-Vice-Chancellor in 1991. He was also involved in student administration as Senior Tutor and Hall Master of Unity Hall from 1972 to 1974 and 1974 to 1976 respectively.

In 1992, Ansa-Asamoah was one of two candidates shortlisted for the position of Vice-Chancellor of KNUST, alongside E. H. Amonoo-Neizer; their names were submitted to the government, and Amonoo-Neizer was ultimately appointed.

Ansa-Asamoah was a member of the Ghana Pharmaceutical Society and was a founding fellow of the West African Postgraduate College of Pharmacists (WAPCP) in 1991.

== Research ==
Ansa-Asamoah’s research focused on pharmacological studies of medicinal plants, drug action, and the effects of therapeutic and narcotic substances, including issues related to drug use and abuse.

He undertook international academic work at the University of Manchester and the University of Sydney, and served as a Fulbright African Senior Research Scholar at Howard University in the United States from 1988 to 1989.

== Death ==
He died on 13 April 1994 in Kumasi at the age of 56. He was serving his second year of his second term as pro vice-chancellor of KNUST at the time of his death.
