= Freda Rhymz =

Ghanaian rapper and songwriter

- Born: Freda Baffour Awuah; August 20, 1993 (age 32); Sunyani, Brong Ahafo, Ghana
- Origin: Ghana
- Genres: Hip hop, Hiplife, Afrobeats, Highlife
- Occupations: Rapper, songwriter
- Years active: 2017–present (after winning MTN Hitmaker)
- Label: Young Mission Entertainment (signed 5-year deal)

Freda Baffour Awuah (born 20 August 1993) popularly known as Freda Rhymz, is a Ghanaian rapper and songwriter from Sunyani in the Brong Ahafo Region of Ghana. She gained recognition when she entered the MTN Hitmaker Competition in 2017 and emerged as the winner of the competition.

== Early life and career ==
Freda Rhymz is the last born of 6 siblings. She received her early schooling at Sunyani's Glory Day Care and continued at Miracle Preparatory School through class four. She continued her studies at St Anthony of Padua, where she completed JHS, and Dormaa Senior High School, both in Sunyani, while pursuing her passion for music. She graduated from Methodist University with a degree in Fine Arts. Afrobeats, Hiphop, Hiplife, and Highlife are among the genres of music she creates. She has worked with artists including Pappy Kojo, Sista Afia, KelvynBoy and D-Black.

== Controversies ==
After some linguistic sparring, Freda Rhymz got violent with rapper Sista Afia.

== Singles ==
Year	Title	Producer	Album	Ref
2020	Saucy ft Sista Afia	Master Garzy	Saucy	
2019	Sing My Song	DannyBeatz	Sing My Song	
2020	Point Of Correction	Snowwie	Point of Correction	
