= Bernard Quainoo =

Dutch footballer

Personal information
- Date of birth: 1 February 1987 (age 39)
- Position: Forward

Youth career
- –2006: PSV

Senior career*
Years	Team	Apps	(Gls)
2006	Helmond Sport	8	(1)
2007–2008	Haarlem	9	(3)
2008	FC Den Bosch	0	(0)
2011	Bishop's Stortford	1	(0)
2012	Rupel Boom		
- * Club domestic league appearances and goals

Bernard Quainoo (born 1 February 1987) is a Dutch retired footballer who is last known to have played as a forward for Rupel Boom.

== Career ==
As a youth player, Quainoo joined the youth academy of Dutch top flight side PSV but left due to injury. In 2006, he signed for Helmond Sport in the Dutch second division, where he made 8 league appearances and scored 1 goal. On 18 August 2006, Quainoo debuted for Helmond Sport during a 1–2 loss to Telstar. On 6 October 2006, he scored his first goal for Helmond Sport during a 1–1 draw with PEC Zwolle.

In 2011, Quainoo signed for English sixth division club Bishop's Stortford after being invited to train with Tottenham in the English Premier League. In 2012, he signed for Belgian third division team Rupel Boom.
