= RuffTown Records =

RuffTown Records is a Ghanaian record label founded in 2015 by Ricky Nana Aygeman (Bullet), a musician and a singer-songwriter in Ghana. Singer Ebony Reigns was the first artist signed to RuffTown Records, but died in a car accident in 2018. Ebony Reigns' first album, under RuffTown was released on December 26, 2017, under the title of Bonyfied. In 2018, the album Bonyfied won the "Album of the Year" at the Vodafone Ghana Music Award.

== Artists ==
Act	Year signed	Albums released	Ref
Ebony Reigns	2015	1	
Danny Beat	2015	1	
Brella	2018	1	
Ms Forson	2018	0	
Kiki Marley	2020	0	
Wendy Shay	2018	2	
Fantana	2019	1	
Ray James	2019	0	
Baba Tundey	2024	0	

== Discography ==
Year	Information
2015	Ebony Reigns - Bonyfied (Album) Release date: December 26, 2017 Single: "Dance Floor"
2016	Ebony Reigns - Bonyfied (Album) Release date: December 26, 2017 Single: "Kupe"
2017	Ebony Reigns - Bonyfied (Album) Release date: December 26, 2017 Single: "Poison ft Gatdoe"
