= Music tourism =

Tourism in or around a town and city hosting concerts

Music tourism is the act of visiting a city or town to see a music festival or other performances. This sort of tourism is particularly important to small villages such as Glastonbury, as well as bigger cities like Glasgow. The fairly recent jam band phenomenon is a contemporary example that encourages music tourism. Music festivals are attended by many tourists annually. Taylor Swift's Eras Tour and Coldplay's Music of the Spheres World Tour are prominent instances of music tourism with their impact on global economy.

The Artful Music Tourist Board movement, started by musicians at London's Paradise Bar (now Royal Albert Pub) in 2003, celebrates the phenomenon.

== Music-related events and destinations ==
There are a large number of music festivals held around the world, usually annually, that attract non-local visitors. The self-proclaimed largest music festival in the world is Summerfest, an 11-day event in Milwaukee, Wisconsin with an annual attendance of nearly

In 2019, the New Orleans Jazz and Heritage Festival presented 12 stages and over 70 booths of Louisiana food. No two food booths serve the same cuisine. Attributed to the Wall Street Journal is that Jazz Fest “showcases a wider, deeper lineup of essential American musical styles than any festival in the nation… ".

New Orleans music tours are available by foot or transport to Congo Square, where American music was born in the birthplace of jazz. New Orleans has been influential to American opera of the 1800s, rock 'n' roll with Cosimo Matassa's recordings and New Orleans rhythm and blues. The city is certainly the world's most diverse music tourism destinations.

There are also a number of annual carnivals, events that include music, dancing and street parties. Some major ones include Rio Carnival in Brazil, which attracts 500,000 foreign visitors annually, and the Salvador de Bahia carnival, which is the largest street party, and attracts crowds of up to two million people throughout its week-long duration.

The Notting Hill Carnival (London, UK) is one of the largest street parties in Europe and attracts around one million people each year.

The Love Parade, an electronic dance music festival in Germany held from 1989 to 2010, saw crowds of 1.6 million at its peak.

There are hundreds of annual festivals celebrating jazz festivals around the world, with the largest, the Montreal International Jazz Festival, seeing 2.5 million attendees every year, one third of whom are tourists.

Overall, an estimated 10 million people travel internationally each year for the main purpose of watching or participating in a music or cultural festival.

There are also some cities and areas that serve as year-round destinations for music-related travel, such as New Orleans, Bayreuth in Germany, Vienna in Austria. Aix-en-Provence in France, La Scala in Milan for opera and classical music, and Britain for rock music.
