= AY Poyoo =

- Born: Emmanuel Yeboah; 5 June 2000 (age 25); Ghana
- Genres: Hip hop
- Occupations: Rapper, songwriter, comedian
- Years active: 2019–present
- Label: Tree Money Yard Empire

Emmanuel Yeboah (born 5 June 2000), known professionally as AY Poyoo, is a Ghanaian rapper and comedian. AY Poyoo gained international attention when BBC News Africa profiled him after his single GOAT (Aponkye) received widespread coverage.

== Early life ==
AY Poyoo was born on 5 June 2000 in Ghana. He grew up in a low-income household with his mother after his father left the family. Although he performed well in the Basic Education Certificate Examination (BECE), he enrolled in a technical school to study auto mechanics because of financial constraints.

== Career ==
AY Poyoo began his music career in 2019 and gained prominence in 2020 when the music video for his debut single GOAT went viral. Later in 2020, American rapper Snoop Dogg mentioned AY Poyoo during a livestream hosted by comedian Michael Blackson.

In July 2020, he announced a planned collaboration with South African musician Sho Madjozi which she later confirmed. And in May 2023, Poyoo appeared at the Vodafone Ghana Music Awards red carpet with a goat as a reference to his breakout single.

In November 2023, he signed with Nigerian label Tree Money Yard Empire and relocated to Nigeria to develop his skills in production, songwriting and audio engineering.

== Musical style ==
AY Poyoo is known for an eccentric performance style that combines humorous lyrics with energetic delivery, characteristic of African hip hop.

== Discography ==
=== Extended plays ===
Year	Title	Notes	Ref(s)
2024	The Rejected Stone	Debut EP	
TBD	Grass to Grace	Announced	

=== Selected singles ===
Year	Title	Collaboration	Ref(s)
2020	"GOAT (Aponkye)"		
2020	"Alcoholics"	feat. Wanlov the Kubolor	
2020	"My Lady"	with Patapaa	
2020	"Ghetto Rules"	feat. Van Choga	
2022	"Kama"	feat. Kudjoe Daze	
2022	"GOAT (Aponkye Remix)"	feat. Van Choga, Show Yoh & Big Xhosa	
2023	"Ama Piano"	feat. Sister Deborah	
2020	"Swimming Pool"		
2024	"Only Me"		

== Awards ==
Year	Award	Category	Result	Ref(s)
2020	YouTube Creator Award	Silver Play Button	Won	

== See also ==
- Ghanaian hip hop
- List of Ghanaian musicians
- Afrobeats
- Patapaa
