= Solomon Quainoo =

Ghanaian pilot

Solomon Quainoo is a Ghanaian pilot. On 2 October 2018, he was the first Ghanaian to fly the world's biggest passenger aircraft, Emirates' Airbus A380 from Dubai to Accra.

== Education ==
Quainoo was born in Ghana but later moved to the UK to live with his family. He had his secondary school education at Koforidua Senior High Technical School in the Eastern Region and furthered at the University of Ghana where he earned a bachelor of science degree in Mathematics, Physics and Geology. He obtained a master's degree in Aerospace, Aeronautical and Astronautical Engineering from the Kingston University in London and trained as a pilot at the Oxford Aviation Training school, United Kingdom, which was where he obtained his license.

== Career ==
After obtaining his master's degree, he worked with British Midland International for six years. During which he flew the Boeing 737 and 300 400 and 500 series, among others. From there, he landed a job with British Airways as a Material Agent/Design Engineer. Quainoo moved to Emirates and there he has worked for seven years. For the first five years at Emirates, he served as an officer and was promoted to captain.

== Awards and recognition ==
He was awarded Aviation man of the Year in West Africa during the 2019 edition of the Balafon Awards.
