= Elder Mireku =

Ghanaian gospel musician and a songwriter

Emmanuel Kwasi Mireku, professionally known as Elder Mireku (born, 12 January 1961), is a Ghanaian gospel musician and a songwriter whose career has spanned more than 40 years.

== Early life and education ==
Mireku was born to Emmanuel Kofi Mireku and Comfort Asiedua Mirekua. He comes from Kwahu Obomeng and Kwahu Atibie in the Eastern Region and has lived the majority of his life in Koforidua. Elder Mireku was educated at Presbyterian Elementary Schools and the Koforidua Technical Institute.

== Music career ==
Mireku's ministry began in the late 1970s. His worship songs earned him an Honorary Doctorate in sacred music from the Ecclesiastical Bishops And Leaders Conference of Africa (affiliated to Kayiwa International University, Uganda) in 2016. Mireku has greatly influenced the gospel music industry and musicians in Ghana. He has released 56 albums, with over 500 songs including "Oko no wako awie", "Odimafo (Tongues)", "Hallelujah" and "Mempa Aba". He was honored with a lifetime achievement award at the first edition of Ghana Music Awards South Africa.

== Personal life ==
He is married to Philomina Mireku and they have two children, Evelyn and James. In a video during one of his performances, Elder Mireku revealed that he had once contemplated suicide after his dream of continuing his education was shattered.

== Discography ==
=== Albums ===
- Bibiara Nye Den (2019)
- Elder Mireku Worship Songs 4 (2018)
- Jesus Wakasa (2019)
- Mempa Aba (2019)
- Wasem Ye Nokware Mame (2019)
- Halleluya - Praise & Worship 41
- Okamafo Nyame
- Empa Aba
- Best Of Worship
- Sarah Anya Nede
- Menya Adom Bi
- Magenkwa
- Praises Vol.1
