= Kingsley Kojo Antwi =

Ghanaian author, poet, filmmaker, and photographer

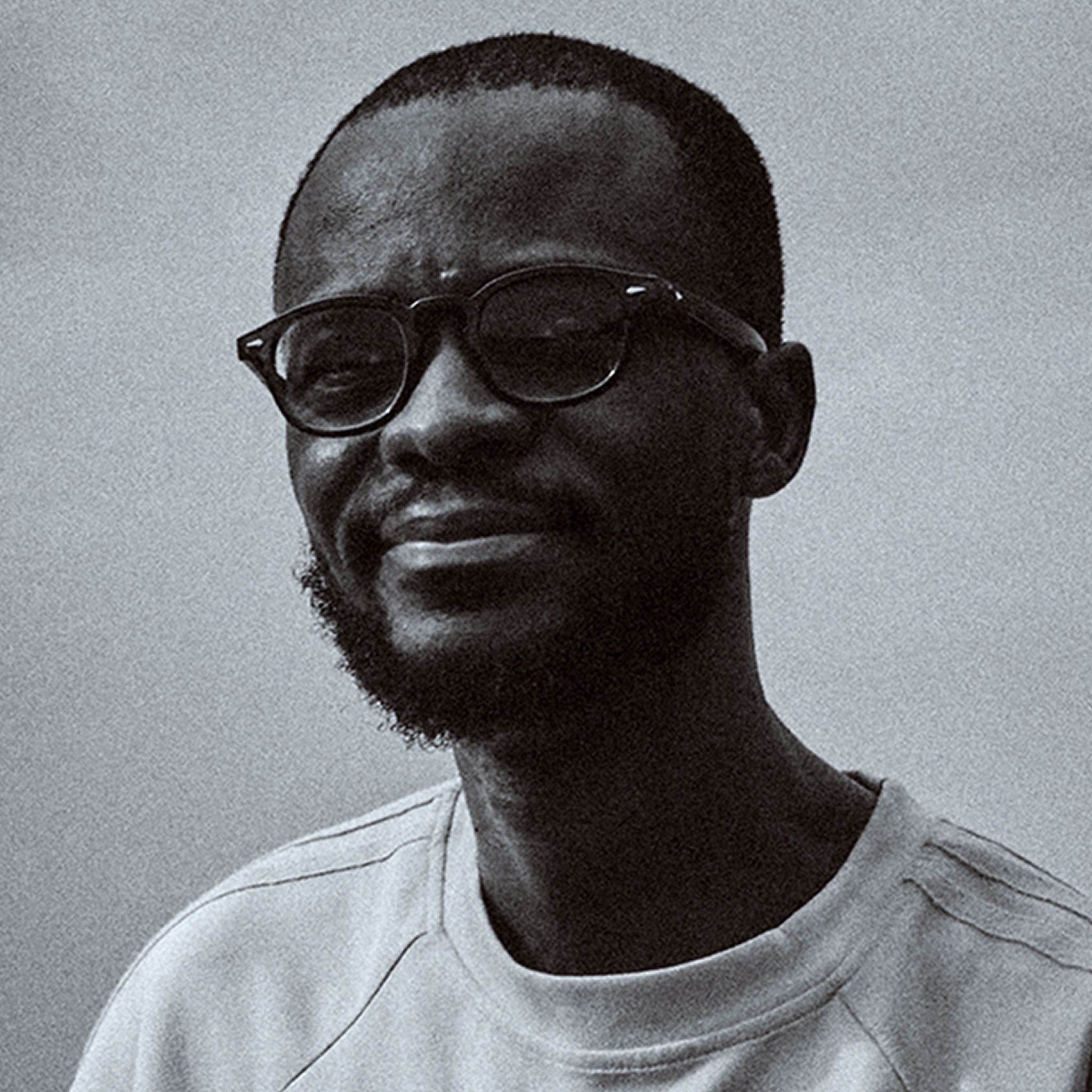
- Kingsley Kojo Antwi in 2022
- Born: 23 July; Kumasi, Ghana
- Occupations: Author, poet, filmmaker, fine art photographer
- Writing career
- Notable works: Bosiako: The Bloodbath, Thirty Million Ghanaians Are Fools, Seventeen Sane
- Notable awards: Inspirational Poet Award (Philippines, 2013)

Kingsley Kojo Antwi (born 23 July), known professionally as Kojo Poet, is a Ghanaian author, poet, filmmaker, and fine art photographer. He is the co-founder and vice president of the Ghana Writers Awards, a national literary initiative promoting excellence in creative writing in Ghana. His work spans poetry, fiction, and visual arts, and has been noted for its engagement with identity, social critique, and contemporary Ghanaian cultural narratives.

Antwi received the Inspirational Poet Award at the International Poetry Festival in the Philippines in 2013, and in 2022 his fine art photography was exhibited at the Imposters Art Gallery in Accra.

== Early life and education ==
Antwi was born in Kumasi, Ghana, and raised in a Christian household. He developed an early interest in reading and literature through children’s newspapers, novels, and documentaries introduced to him by his father.

He attended Datus Complex Schools in Bubiashie, where he served as library prefect. From 2006 to 2009, he studied General Science at Koforidua Secondary Technical School (KSTS).

Between 2011 and 2015, he studied at the University of Education, Winneba, earning a Bachelor of Science in Information and Communication Technology Education.

== Career ==
=== Poetry ===
Antwi published his debut poetry collection, Bosiako: The Bloodbath, in 2020. The book received national attention in Ghana for its exploration of cultural symbolism, identity, and contemporary social issues. ModernGhana described the collection as "a literary bloodbath" for its experimental structure and thematic intensity.

In 2013, he won the Inspirational Poet Award at the International Poetry Festival in the Philippines.

=== Fiction ===
In 2025, Antwi published his debut novel Thirty Million Ghanaians Are Fools, Seventeen Sane, a socio-political satire examining corruption, civic responsibility, and public morality in contemporary Accra. The narrative follows Kofi Asamoah, a pharmacist navigating personal ethics and national contradictions. ModernGhana described the novel as a "genre-defying narrative" that reflects Ghana’s shifting political and social dynamics.

=== Ghana Writers Awards ===
Antwi co-founded the Ghana Writers Awards to recognize excellence in Ghanaian and African writing. The program has received coverage from several independent outlets including ModernGhana, Graphic Online, GhanaWeb, and MyJoyOnline.

=== Photography ===
In 2022, Antwi exhibited his photographic series She Made Me Do It at the Imposters Art Gallery in Accra. His photography explores identity, human experience, and social perception, often using visual metaphors to comment on societal and environmental issues.

== Bibliography ==
- Bosiako: The Bloodbath (2020)
- Thirty Million Ghanaians Are Fools, Seventeen Sane (2025)

== Awards ==
- Inspirational Poet Award, International Poetry Festival, Philippines (2013)
