= Lawrence Tetteh =

Ghanaian evangelist

Reverend Lawrence Tetteh
- President, Worldwide Miracle Outreach
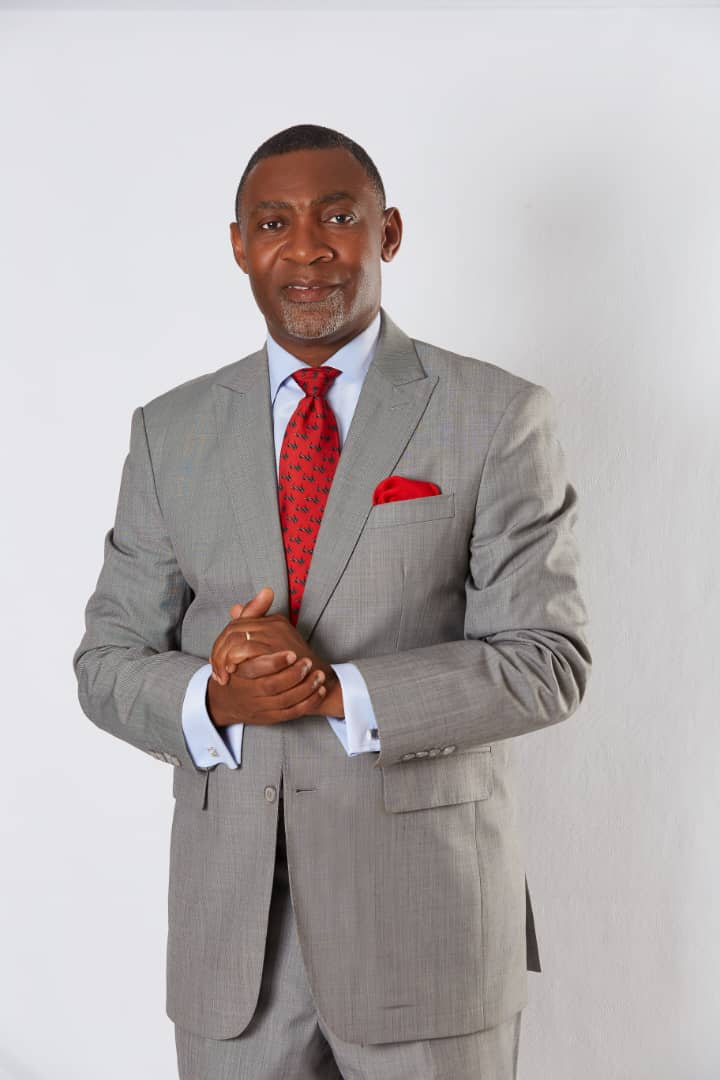

Personal details
- Born: Lawrence Nene Kofi Tetteh Jamestown, Accra, Ghana
- Denomination: Evangelical Christianity
- Spouse: Barbara Tetteh
- Children: David Tetteh & Emmanuel Prince Tetteh
- Occupation: Tele-evangelist; philanthropist; lecturer; author; international economist

Lawrence Nene Kofi Tetteh (born 15 May 1964), also known as Reverend Canon Dr Lawrence Tetteh, is a Ghanaian televangelist, philanthropist, and Chaplain of the Ghana Christian Council of the UK and Ireland. He is an author, international economist, lecturer, and founding President of the Worldwide Miracle Outreach, headquartered in London, United Kingdom.

== Early life and education ==
Lawrence Nene Kofi Tetteh was born in Jamestown, Accra, to Sampson Kwadjo Tetteh of Dodowa and Juliana Norchoe Tetteh of Osu in the Greater Accra Region of Ghana. He pursued his education at the Corvinus University of Budapest of Economics Sciences in Hungary and the London School of Economics (LSE) in the United Kingdom. While working towards his PhD in international relations at Corvinus, he was ordained as a Reverend Minister by Dr. T. L. Osborn and Archbishop Benson Idahosa in the United Kingdom.

== Personal life ==
Tetteh is married to Barbara Tetteh, an ordained minister, administrator, and social scientist. He has seven siblings, namely Alex Tetteh, Prince John Tetteh, Lady Gifty Dede Tetteh, Ebenezer Tetteh, Victoria Tetteh Ackah, Princess Tetteh Cudjoe, and Michelle Grace Tetteh Caesar.

== Career ==
Tetteh was ordained a Reverend Minister by Dr. T. L. Osborn and Archbishop Benson Idahosa, establishing the Worldwide Miracle Outreach. He is an author of books such as Dangers of Offence, Count your Blessings, and Benefits of the Anointing. He serves as a televangelist, philanthropist, public speaker, and hosts the Miracle Touch TV programme globally. He also holds visiting lecturer positions in Economics and International Relations at various universities.

Tetteh has collaborated with prominent ministers such as Oral Roberts, Richard Roberts, T. L. Osborn, Kenneth E. Hagin, Archbishop Desmond Tutu, Morris Cerullo, Archbishop Benson Idahosa, Benny Hinn, Pastor Ayo Oritsejafor, Dr. Richard Shakarian, and others. He engages in ecumenical relationships, working with various mainstream and Pentecostal churches like Anglican, Methodist, Presbyterian, Catholic, Apostolic, and Assemblies of God to spread the gospel in Ghana and around the world.

He delivered the keynote address at the first National crusade of the Methodist Church Ghana in 2002, held at the Independence Square in Accra. He also organized the Asanteman for Christ Crusade alongside Dr. Richard Roberts of the Oral Roberts Evangelistic Association at the Kumasi sports stadium, with Otumfour Osei Tutu II, the king of the Ashanti Kingdom, as the special guest of honor.

He has been a speaker at the Full Gospel Business Men's Fellowship International (FGBMFI), serving as the main speaker for the world conventions in Florida, U.S. in 2008 and in Yerevan, Armenia in 2013.

He has also been the main speaker for significant crusades organized by the Presbyterian Church of Ghana and The Anglican Church, held at the Independence Square Accra.

In 2017, Tetteh was inducted as an Honorary Canon by the Anglican Church, under the leadership of Archbishop Daniel Sarfo, Primate of the Church of the Province of West Africa.

In November 2025 he was the keynote speaker for the African Highroad Leadership Conference which happened in Nairobi, Kenya in which he spoke on the topic The Dangers Of Offence which he described as a major setback for many emerging leaders.

== Philanthropic work ==
Tetteh has engaged in philanthropic activities, including gifting a taxi driver who returned a substantial amount of money with a new car. He has also shown concern for issues such as herbal medicine in Ghana and the misuse of prophecies by some religious leaders.

== Controversial statements ==
Tetteh has made statements on various subjects, including his view on the spirituality of all-night vigil services, which sparked controversy. He clarified that he was critical of the excesses associated with such services, rather than their spirituality.

Tetteh has also commented on religious leaders practicing what they preach and voiced his opinion on herbal medicine, stating that it is not inherently fetish. He has shared thoughts on various matters, including the misuse of prophecies and taking advantage of tragic events for profit.

In 2018, he called on the Prince of Wales, who was the head of the Commonwealth at the time, to use his office to grant amnesty to law-abiding Ghanaian citizens without regular stay in the United Kingdom.

== Awards and recognition ==
Tetteh's contributions have been recognized through several awards and honors, including:

- Induction as an Honorary Canon in the Anglican Church in 2017 by Archbishop Daniel Sarfo.
- Appointment as ambassador of peace by the United Nations Federation of Peace in South Korea.
- Reception of the Hungarian highest award, the Knight Cross of the Order of Merit of Hungary, in March 2022 from the President of Hungary.
- Induction as National Patron of the Boys' Brigade of the Methodist Church of Ghana.
- National Clergy Association of Ghana (NACAG) Eminent African Peace Maker Award.
- Appointment as Advisor to Hungary-Africa Knowledge Centre.
- Honoured as the Face of Africa for John C. Maxwell Africa Highroad Leadership Conference 2025.

== Books ==
Lawrence Tetteh is the author of several books, including:

- Benefits of the Anointing
- Count Your Blessings
- Dangers of Offence
- God Is Able
- Do Miracles Still Happen?
- The Power of Prayer
- Changing Your Destiny
- Possessing Your Possessions
- Experiencing the Power of God
- Understanding Deliverance
- Witchcraft in the Church
- The Name of Jesus
- This Nonsense Must Stop
- Lord I Need a Miracle
- Whosoever Believes
- The Power of Praise
- Understanding the Anointing
- The Power of Silence
- Staying in Your Calling
