= Gifty =

Gifty is a given name. Notable people with the name include:

- Empress Gifty, Ghanaian musician
- Gifty Acheampong (born 1999), Ghanaian footballer
- Gifty Addy (born 1984), Ghanaian sprinter
- Gifty Afenyi-Dadzie (born 1957), Ghanaian journalist and businessperson
- Gifty Anti (born 1970), Ghanaian journalist and broadcaster
- Gifty Ayew Asare (born 1998), Ghanaian footballer
- Gifty Assifuah (born 2000), Ghanaian footballer
- Gifty Osei Boakye Bingley, Ghanaian journalist and broadcaster
- Gifty Klenam (born 1970), Ghanaian politician
- Gifty Eugenia Kwofie (born 1958), Ghanaian politician
- Gifty Mensah (born 1998), Ghanaian badminton player
- Gifty Ohene-Konadu (born 1957), Ghanaian politician
- Gifty Oware-Mensah (born 1986), Ghanaian politician
- Gifty Twum-Ampofo (born 1967), Ghanaian politician
