= Audrey Gadzekpo =

Ghanaian dean and media practitioner

Dean of School of Information and Communication Studies University of Ghana

Personal details
- Education: University of Ghana (B.A.); Brigham Young University (M.A); University of Birmingham (PhD)
- Occupation: Lecturer
- Profession: Professor

Professor Audrey Sitsofe Gadzekpo is a Ghanaian media practitioner and dean of the School of Information and Communications Studies at the University of Ghana. She was formerly a Communications Consultant and Lecturer who represented women's groups. She is also a member of the Webster Ghana's advisory board.

== Education ==
She is an Associate professor of Journalism and Media Studies. She attended the University of Birmingham in Britain where she graduated with PhD in Education at the Center for West African Studies. She had her M.A in Communications from Brigham Young University in Utah in USA and her Bachelor of Arts in English from the University of Ghana.

== Career ==
She began her career in 1993. In January 2017, President Nana Akufo-Addo named her as a committee member for the planning of the 60th Independent anniversary of Ghana.

In June 2017, she was among the members of the National Media Commission that were inducted to help pass the Broadcasting and the Right to Information bills into law.

In June 2017, she spoke at the Maiden Edition of Women in PR Ghana Seminar with Dr. Ayokoe Anim-Wright, Cynthia E. Ofori-Dwumfuo and Gifty Bingley.

Her research is primarily geared towards gender, media and governance issues.

In February 2021, she was among an eight-member committee to select a new name for the Film industry in Ghana.

She is currently the Dean of School of Information and Communication Studies at the University of Ghana.

== Personal life ==
She has a daughter called Nubuke Gadzekpo Amoah who is a fellow of the third class of the Africa Leadership Initiative-West Africa and a member of the Aspen Global Leadership Network.

== Awards and honors ==
She was a visiting scholar at Northwestern University in Chicago in USA at the Program of African Studies from September to December 2005.

She was also a Guest Researcher at Nordic Africa Institute in the African Guest Researchers Program in 2012 (Research Cluster ‘Conflict, Security and Democratic Transformation).

In March 2020, she received an award in the 5th Ghana Women of Excellence Awards for her leadership role.

She was paid homage by Anas Aremeyaw Anas for her role in his rise through the undercover journalism in Ghana.
