= Gifty Ayew Asare =

Ghanaian football player

Personal information
- Full name: Gifty Ayew Asare
- Date of birth: June 9, 1998 (age 28)
- Place of birth: Accra, Ghana
- Height: 1.70 m (5 ft 7 in)
- Position: Forward

Youth career
- 2012–2013: Bafana Ladies

College career
Years	Team	Apps	(Gls)
2016–2017	Northern Oklahoma- Tonkawa Mavericks	41	(50)

Senior career*
Years	Team	Apps	(Gls)
2013–2014	Samaria Ladies F.C.	24	(22)
2014–2015	Blessed Ladies F.C.	20	(18)
2017	Dayton Dutch Lions	15	(5)

International career
2018–	Ghana		
- * Club domestic league appearances and goals

Gifty Ayew Asare (born 9 June 1998) is a Ghanaian footballer who plays as a striker. In 2018, she was called up to play for the Black Queens, the Ghana women's national football team, after netting 27 goals in 19 matches for Northern Oklahoma College's Lady Maverick F.C Soccer Team. Played in the US with 50 goals in Two Seasons in NJCAA D1 League.

- Won Player of the Week Multiple Times in all her Two Seasons in US NJCAA D1 League.

- Won Two Times Best Offensive Player of The Year in Two Seasons in US NJCAA D1 League.

- Won The MVP and Earned All American Third Team Recognition in US NJCAA D1 League.

- A License C and D Coach. FIFA Youth Development Coach

- Women's National Team U-18 Assistant Coach

-FC Epiphany Warriors Assistant Coach

== Early life and education ==
Gifty was born in Accra. She attended Assin Manso Senior High School, Asuanse Technical Institute and completed Blessed Tutorial College for her second cycle education. She continued to study Health, Physical Education, and Recreation at the Northern Oklahoma College.

== Club career ==
Gifty started her football career playing for PSK Soccer Queens Academy in Komenda. She joined Bafana Ladies (now Sealions FC) from 2011 to 2013 before moving to Samaria Ladies in Lapaz. She later joined Blessed Ladies FC in the Ghana Women's Premier League in the 2014/2015 season.

In 2016, she gained a scholarship to further her education at the Northern Oklahoma College, where she played for the school's women soccer team, Lady Maverick F.C and won the Most Valuable Player Award in 2017. She was also shortlisted for the All-American Third Team in their 2017 NJCAA Division One Women's League.

In 2017, she become the first professional footballer to take part in the Miss Ghana USA.

== International career ==
In 2014 she was assigned her first national duty to play for the Black Maidens ahead of the U17 World Cup hosted in Costa Rica but did not make the cut. In 2017 she was called up by the then Black Queens coach Dramani Mas-Ud Didi in his 28-member provisional squad for camping ahead of an international friendly against France on October 23 in Paris.

== Honours ==
- 6 times M.V.P: 2015–16 National 'D'1 League– Ghana
- 2017–18 NJCAA Women's Soccer (all-American selected 3rd team) – U.S.A
