= UT Arlington Mavericks =

Intercollegiate sports teams of University of Texas at Arlington

- University: University of Texas at Arlington
- Nickname: Mavericks
- NCAA: Division I
- Conference: UAC (primary); ASUN (men's tennis)
- Athletic director: Jon Fagg
- Location: Arlington, Texas
- Varsity teams: 15
- Basketball arena: College Park Center
- Baseball stadium: Clay Gould Ballpark
- Softball stadium: Allan Saxe Field
- Other venues: Maverick Stadium; UTA Tennis Center
- Colors: Royal blue, white, and orange
- Mascot: Blaze
- Fight song: UTA Fight Song
- Website: utamavs.com

The UT Arlington Mavericks (abbreviated UT Arlington, UTA, and Mavs) are the athletic teams that represent the University of Texas at Arlington in Arlington, Texas. The Mavericks currently compete in the NCAA Division I Western Athletic Conference (WAC) in 15 varsity sports. The number will rise to 16 in the 2026/27 academic year when women's flag football begins their first season of competition. The addition of flag football will also coincide with the WAC's rebranding as the United Athletic Conference. UTA will remain a member of the newly rebranded UAC. When UAC expansion was first announced, UTA was the only member that does not sponsor (full-contact) football; the UAC would later add Little Rock as a second full non-football member effective in 2026–27.

Jon Fagg is the current athletic director. Prior to his stint at UTA, he was a Deputy Athletics Director, overseeing daily administration and NCAA compliance for the Arkansas Razorbacks at the University of Arkansas. Fagg replaced Jim Baker, who led the Athletic Department from 2012 to 2022.

== History ==
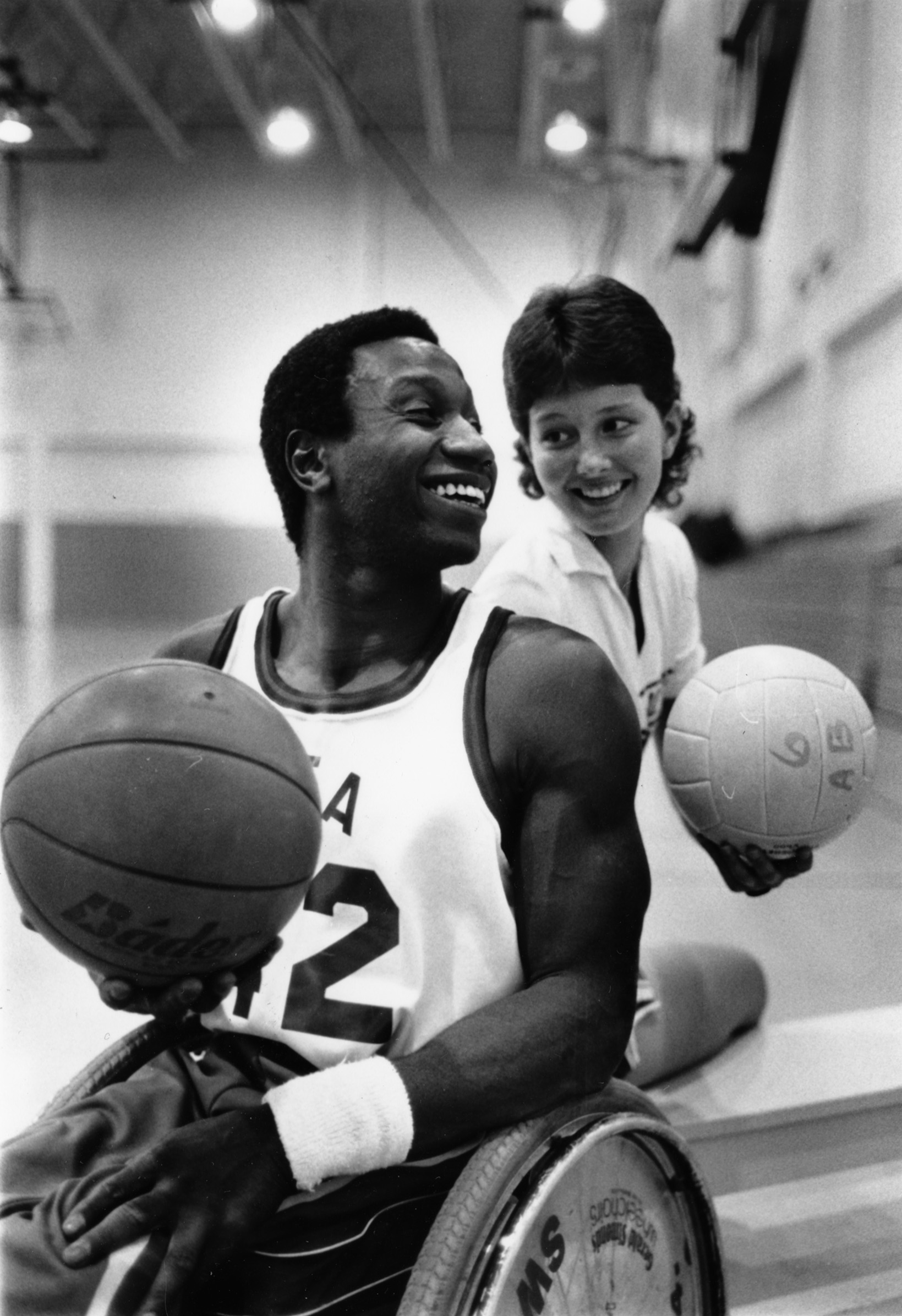
UTA Freewheeler player Abu Yilla (left) with UTA volleyball player Judith McGill (right), 1985

UTA was a founding member of the Southland Conference in 1963 and participated in the league until the end of the 2011–12 athletic year. They joined the Western Athletic Conference for one year before they moved to the Sun Belt Conference. They left the Sun Belt and rejoined the WAC on July 1, 2022.

UT Arlington won the Southland Conference's Commissioners Cup three times since the award was first instituted in 1998. The Commissioner's Cup is awarded to the athletics program with the highest all-around performance in all conference events, including all men's and women's events. The Athletic Department finished within two points of the Bubas Cup, the Sun Belt's all-sports championship trophy, twice in 2014-15 and 2016–17, as well as a second-place finish in 2018–19.

When the school transitioned from junior college to University status in 1959, the schools athletic teams were known as the Rebels. Controversy would surround the name after a decades time. A series of events would occur that lead to a change in mascots to the current version. The Mavericks' name selection was made in 1971, predating the National Basketball Association's expansion franchise Dallas Mavericks' starting choice in 1980.

The first women's programs began competition in the 1973–74 school year. Volleyball, basketball and softball were the first three programs, competing in the AIAW until the teams moved under the umbrella of the NCAA in 1982–83.

== Sports sponsored ==
Men's sports	Women's sports
Baseball	Basketball
Basketball	Cross country
Cross country	Golf
Golf	Softball
Tennis	Tennis
Track & field^{1}	Track & field^{1}
	Volleyball
^{1} – includes both indoor and outdoor

=== Basketball ===
==== Men's basketball ====
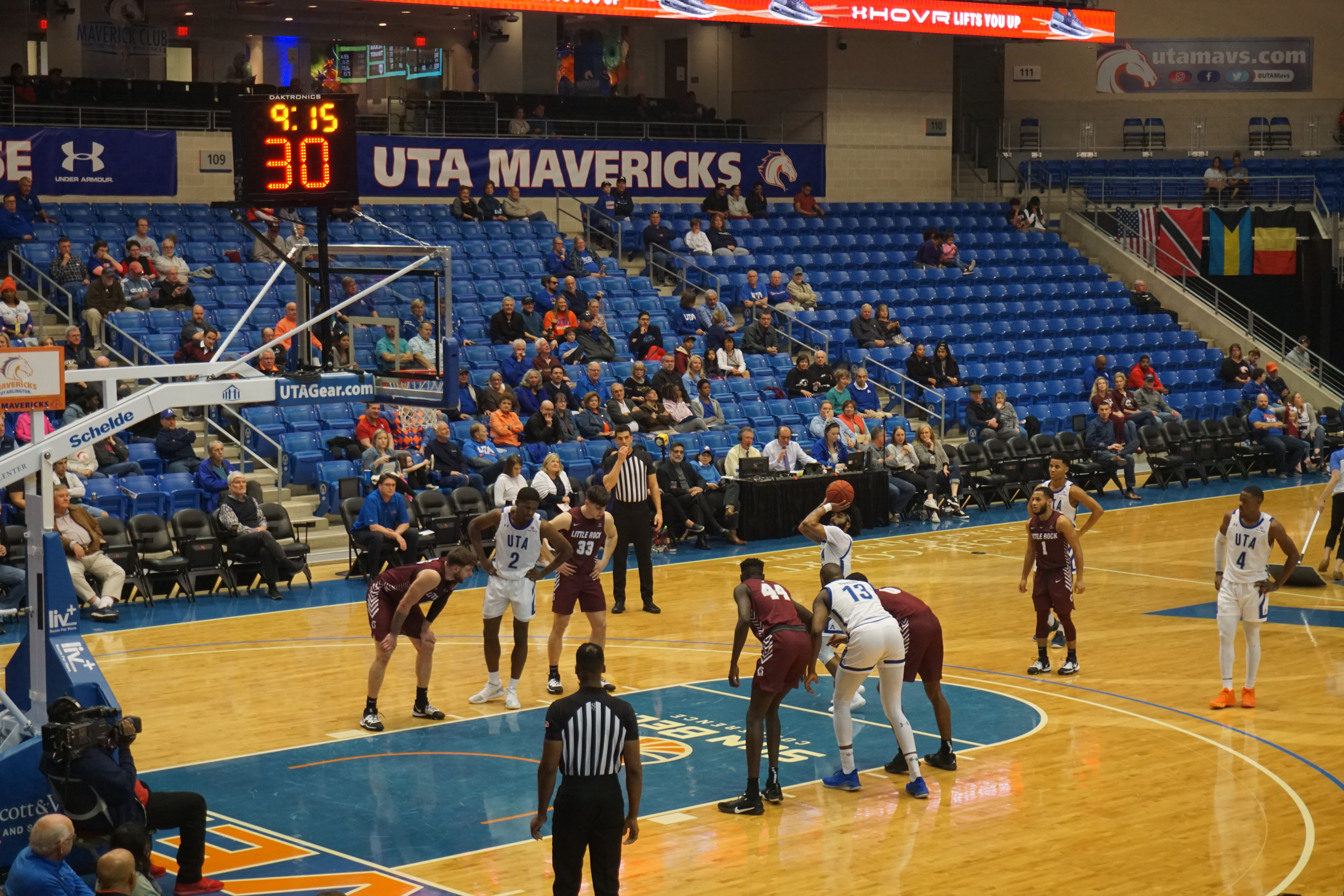
UT Arlington v Little Rock game in 2020

Home games are played at College Park Center, located on University of Texas at Arlington's campus in Arlington. The team appeared in the 2008 NCAA tournament, losing against the No. 1 seed Memphis in the first round. Later, Memphis had to forfeit their win for "ineligible competition, impermissible benefits and failure to monitor its athletics programs."

On November 29, 2016, the Mavericks defeated the Texas Longhorns in Austin for the first time in program history after 11 attempts. The Longhorns decided to terminate their contract with them after their 2016 loss due to the Mavericks becoming too competitive. The terminated contract paid the Mavericks a large lump sum for each game played in Austin for six consecutive years (2011-2016).

Although only 22 of 65 University seasons have resulted in an overall winning record, 13 of the past 22 seasons have finished with a .500 winning percentage or greater, including a school record 27 wins in the 2016–17 season (as of the conclusion of the 2022–23 season). They won the Southland Conference regular season championship in 2012, along with a tie for the 2004 regular season championship and a 2008 conference tournament championship that led to their first NCAA Tournament appearance. The first Sun Belt regular season title was earned in the record-setting year of 2016–2017.

Overall, the team has played in six postseason tournaments and won four conference championships.

==== Women's basketball ====
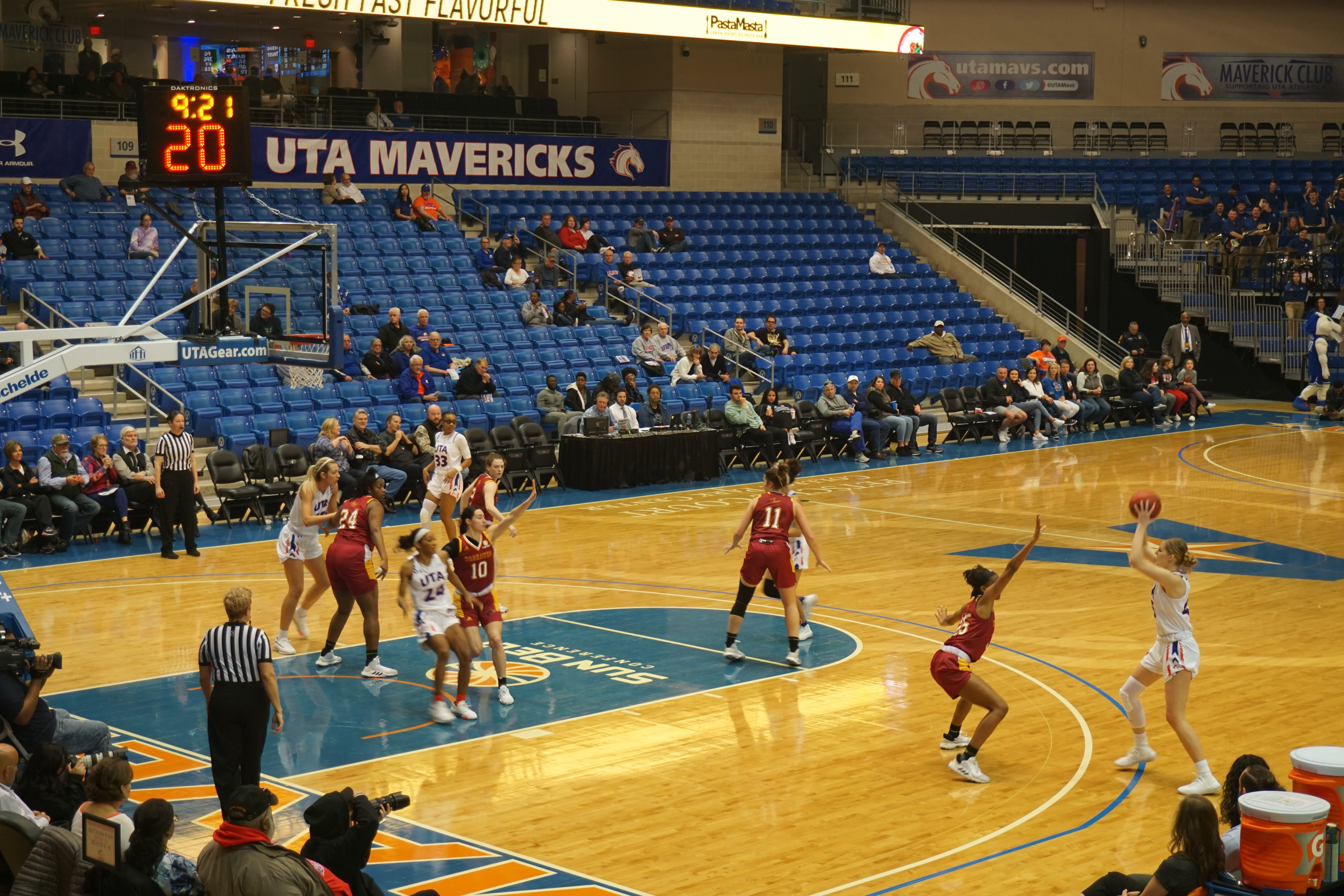
UT Arlington vs Louisiana–Monroe game, 2020

The women's basketball team was established in 1973 and experienced early success with a combined 64–32 record in three seasons between 1975 and 1977. The Mavericks participated in several AIAW state and regional tournaments before joining the Southland Conference beginning with the 1982–83 season.

Between 2004 and 2010, the team posted an overall record of 121–65. During this time span, highlights included a perfect 16–0 Southland Conference record for the 2006–07 season and two NCAA tournament appearances in (2005 and 2007).

In 2016–17, the team earned an at-large NIT bid. In 2018/19, the Mavericks finished in a tie for the Sun Belt regular season title. UTA played in the WNIT again, winning their first-round game against Stephen F. Austin, the first postseason win in program history.

In 2021/22, the basketball team finished second in the regular season. UTA advanced to the Sun Belt Tournament final where the Mavericks earned a 76–62 win over number one seed Troy. This marked the third overall appearance in the NCAA tournament.

UTA has played in three NCAA and four NIT tournaments (as of the end of the 2022/23 season).

=== Baseball ===
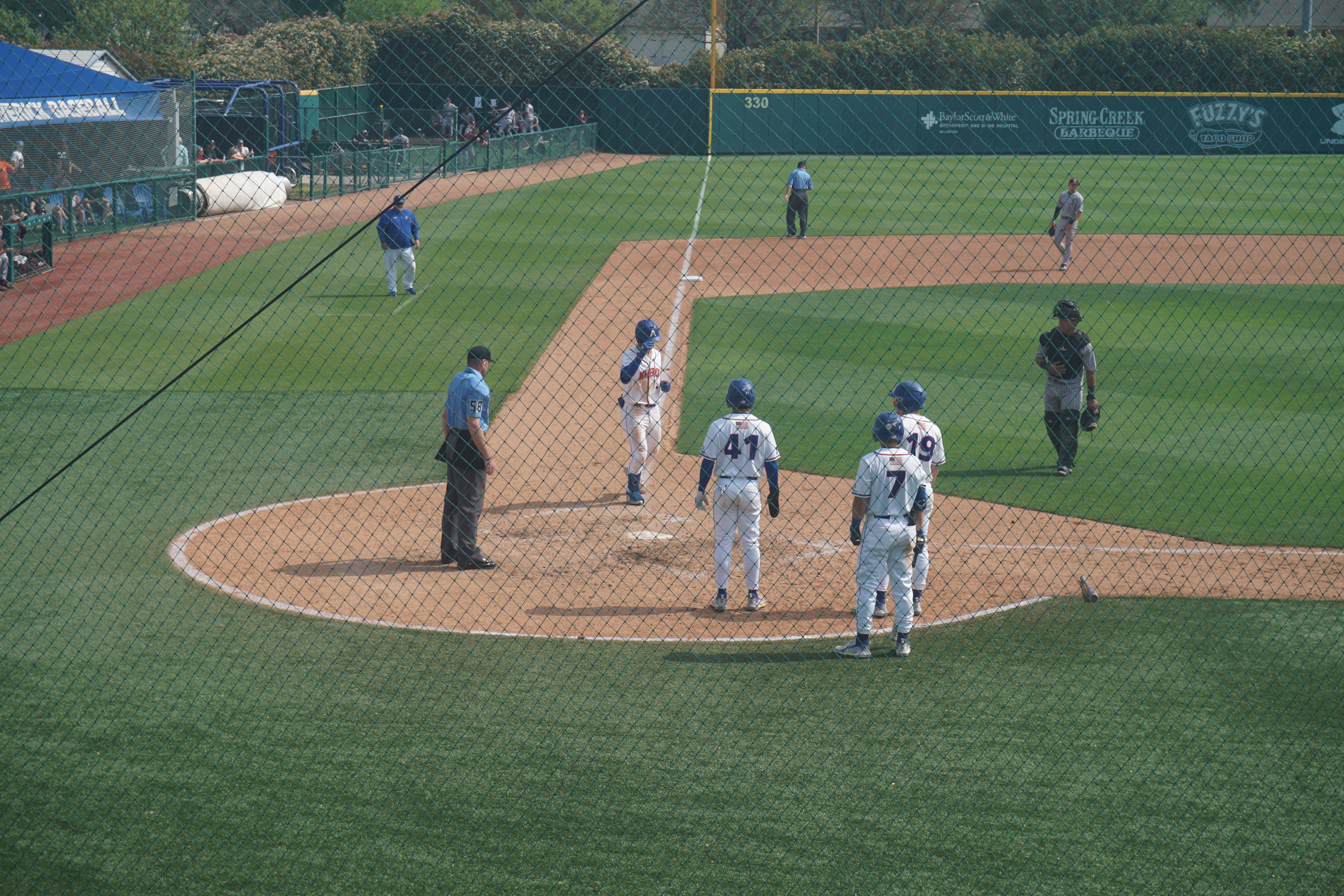
UT Arlington celebration in a game v Texas State, 2022

The baseball team plays at Clay Gould Ballpark, located at the southwestern edge of the UT Arlington campus. The inaugural season was in 1969. Highlights include Southland Conference regular season championships in 1990 and 1992 along with tournament championships in 2001, 2006 and 2012. The team also won a share of the 2013 Western Athletic Conference regular season title and their first outright divisional Sun Belt Conference regular season title in 2017.

Despite the Mavericks winning a minimum of 30 games in the 1980s and sporting a total winning percentage of.587, UTA could not get past the Lamar Cardinals (4) nor the Louisiana Tech Bulldogs (3) and enter the NCAA Tournament. Three seasons after those two teams left, UTA entered the tournament for the first time in 1990, the first of five times the Mavericks would enter the postseason. UTA lost by one run to the top seeded Texas Longhorns. The Mavericks went 0–2 in 1992, losing to Creighton and the Longhorns again. In 2001, UTA sandwiched two losses to Rice around a 7–6 victory over the Houston Cougars. That win to date is the sole postseason win for the Maverick program. In 2006, The Mavericks experienced a 10 inning 6–5 loss to North Carolina State. In 2012, UTA earned their highest seed in the current format at three and played in the Waco Regional, going 0–2. The current 12 season drought is the longest period between NCAA tournaments in program history.

=== Volleyball ===
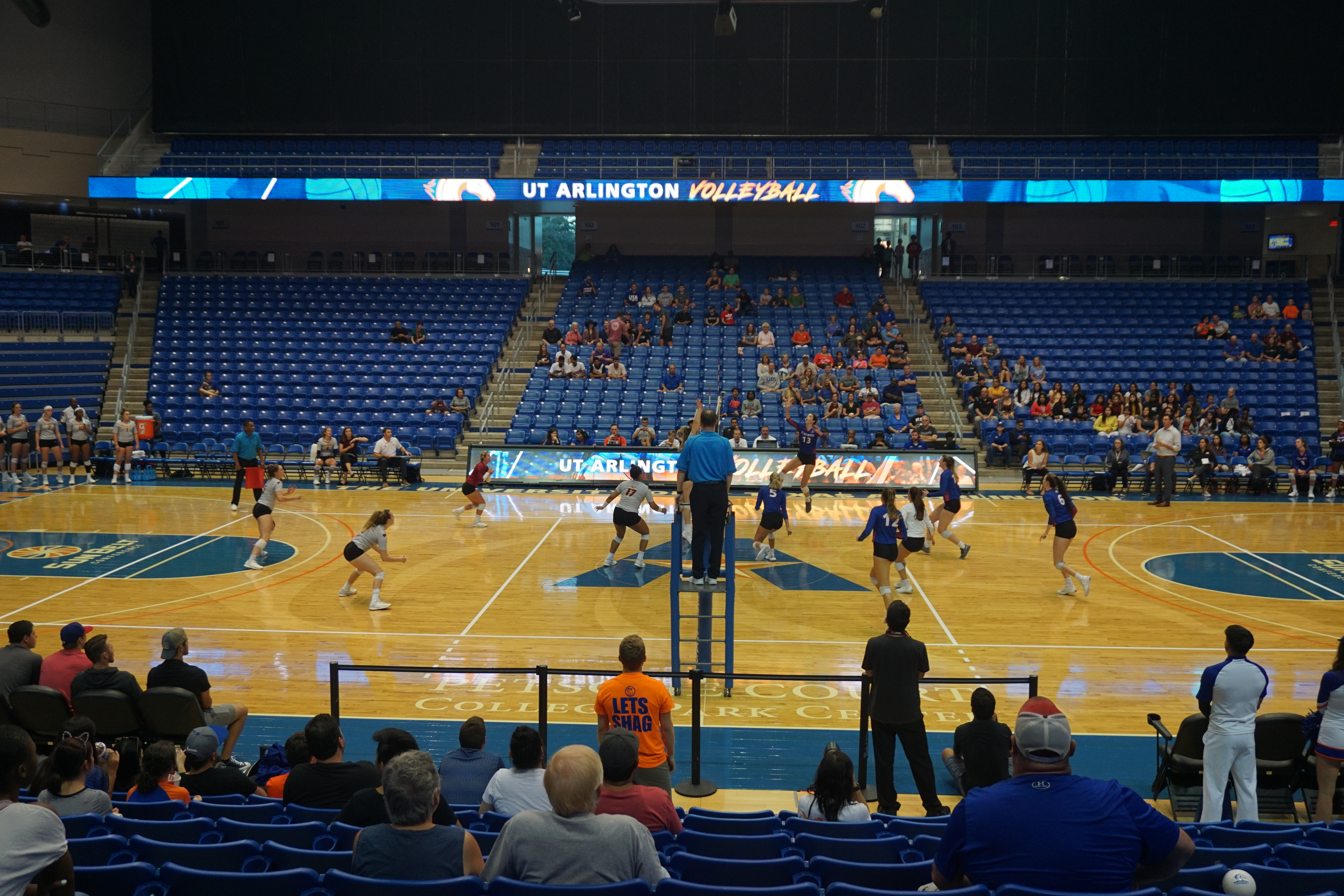
UT Arlington volleyball match v Louisiana–Monroe, 2019

The first season for volleyball at UT Arlington was in 1973. The volleyball team appeared in the national rankings in the 1970s during their time in the AIAW and towards the end of the 1980s in the NCAA. They advanced to the NCAA Division I Volleyball Final Four in 1989. UT Arlington is one of only three institutions in Texas to ever reach the NCAA Division I Volleyball Final Four.

The team won 12 Southland Conference regular season championships, including the first 9 from 1982 to 1990 as well as 10 Southland Tournament crowns. In 2024, the team won their first WAC championship. They have appeared in 16 AIAW National and NCAA Tournaments. The team has secured seven NCAA tournament victories. The Mavericks ended the longest NCAA Tournament drought in program history by winning the 2024 WAC tournament. The previous appearance was in 2002.

=== Softball ===
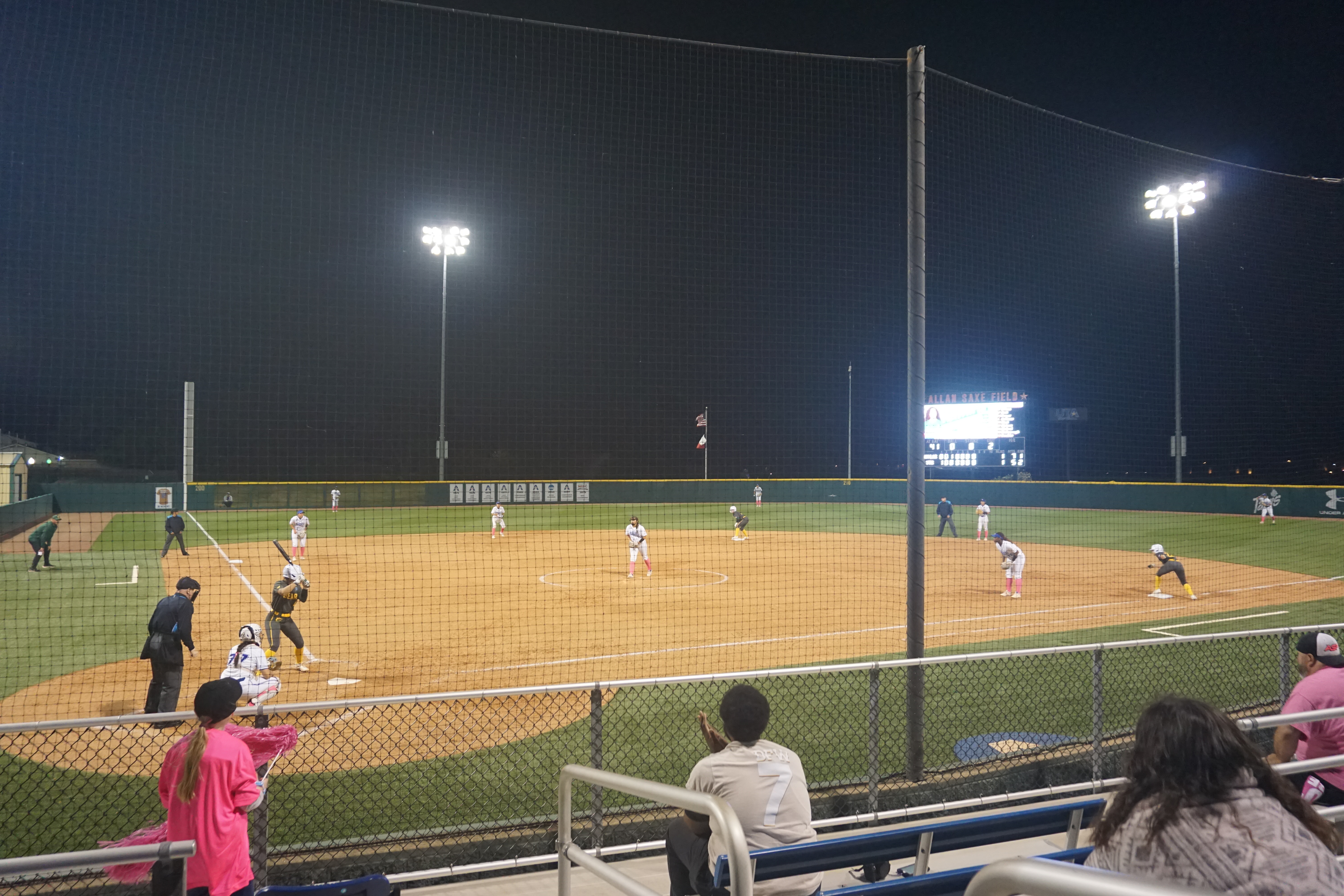
UT Arlington vs Baylor softball game, 2022

UTA softball plays their home games at Allan Saxe Field, adjacent to Clay Gould Ballpark. The Mavericks began play in 1973 and have compiled a record of 1,487–1,342–9, a winning percentage of .525 (as of the conclusion of the 2024 season). Along the way, they have won five Southland Conference regular season titles and one tournament title. Their lone appearance in the NCAA tournament came in 2003, where they went 2–2. In 2017, they played in the National Invitational Softball Championships. In 2019, UTA claimed the NISC championship, defeating Iowa State 4–3 in the championship game.

Prior to competing in the NCAA, the Mavericks were members of the AIAW, where they competed in two Women's College World Series tournaments.

=== Football ===
UT Arlington began play as a junior college in 1919 and played at that level until 1958. They won Junior Rose Bowls in 1956 and 1957, as well as the Junior College National Championship, as Arlington State College.

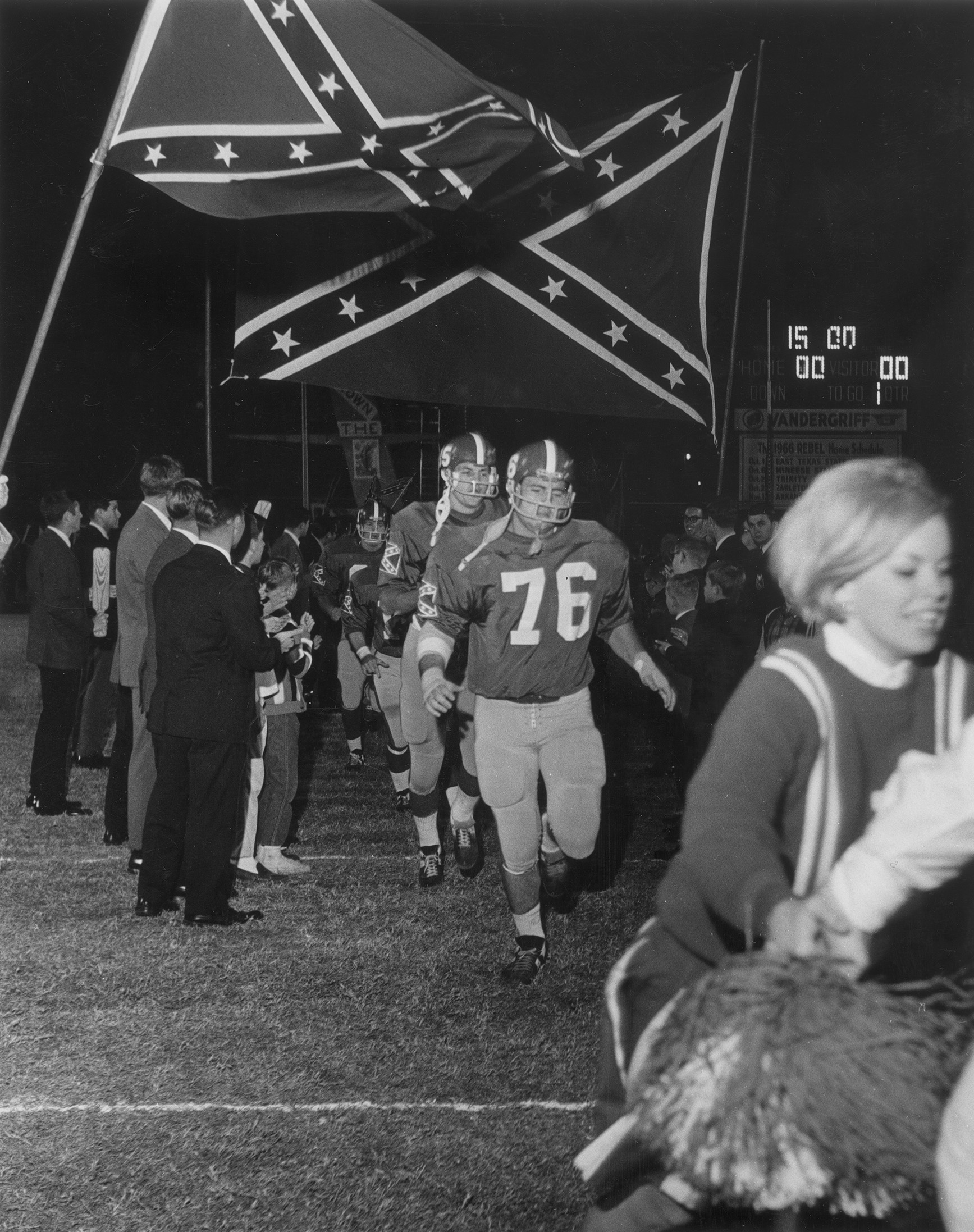
Arlington football players running under Rebel flags, unknown date

After becoming a four-year University, UTA fielded a College Division (Division II today) football program as an independent from 1959 to 1963, joined the Southland Conference in the College Division from 1964 to 1970, a University Level (Division I) program from 1971 to 1981 and a Division I-AA program from 1982 to 1985. Home games were played in Maverick Stadium beginning in the 1980 season. UTA earned conference championships in 1966, 1967 and 1981. In 1967, the team won the Pecan Bowl against the North Dakota Fighting Sioux, the only bowl game in its history.

The team was disbanded after the 1985 season due to major financial losses (nearly one million dollars per year) and low home game average attendance (5,600 with 23,100 students). By the end, the program was funded by the university's auxiliary enterprise income while the other 14 sports were under-funded, as football accounted for half the total athletic budget.

In April 2004, UT Arlington students voted by a 2-to-1 margin to increase their student athletic fees by $2 per semester-credit hour should the university reinstate football and begin women's golf and soccer teams. President James D. Spaniolo, who just began his post leading the school, decided to pursue a new multi-purpose venue, which materialized when College Park Center opened in 2012. He also made the announcement to relook at adding football in five years. While several Freedom of Information requests uncovered two different feasibility studies, nothing public occurred in the ensuing years.

In April 2023, student again voted to increase the student fee to fund a football program and two additional women's sports. The non-binding referendum has not been publicly acted upon by the administration as of the end of 2024.

== Other sports ==
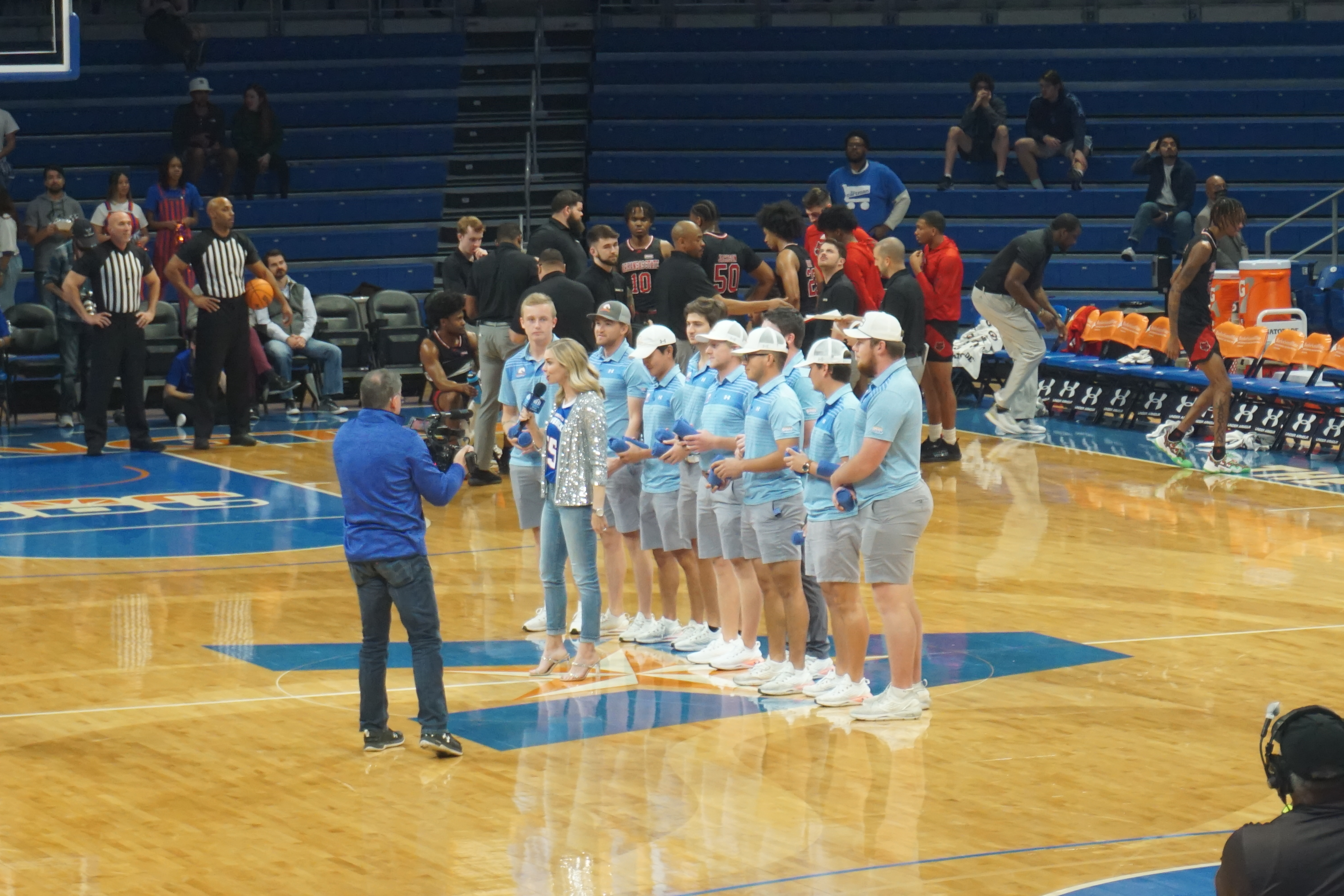
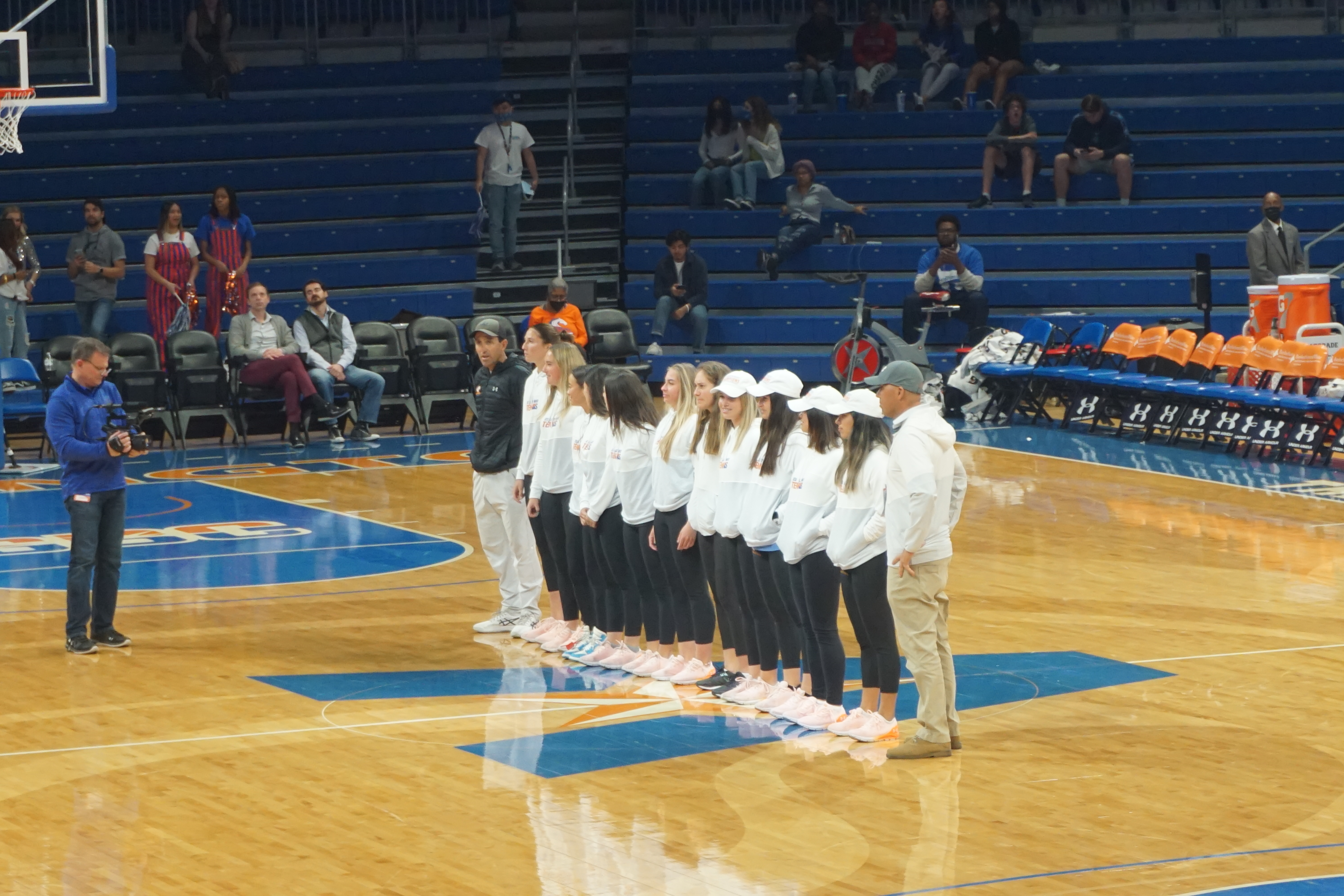
Golf (left) and women's tennis players being honored in 2022

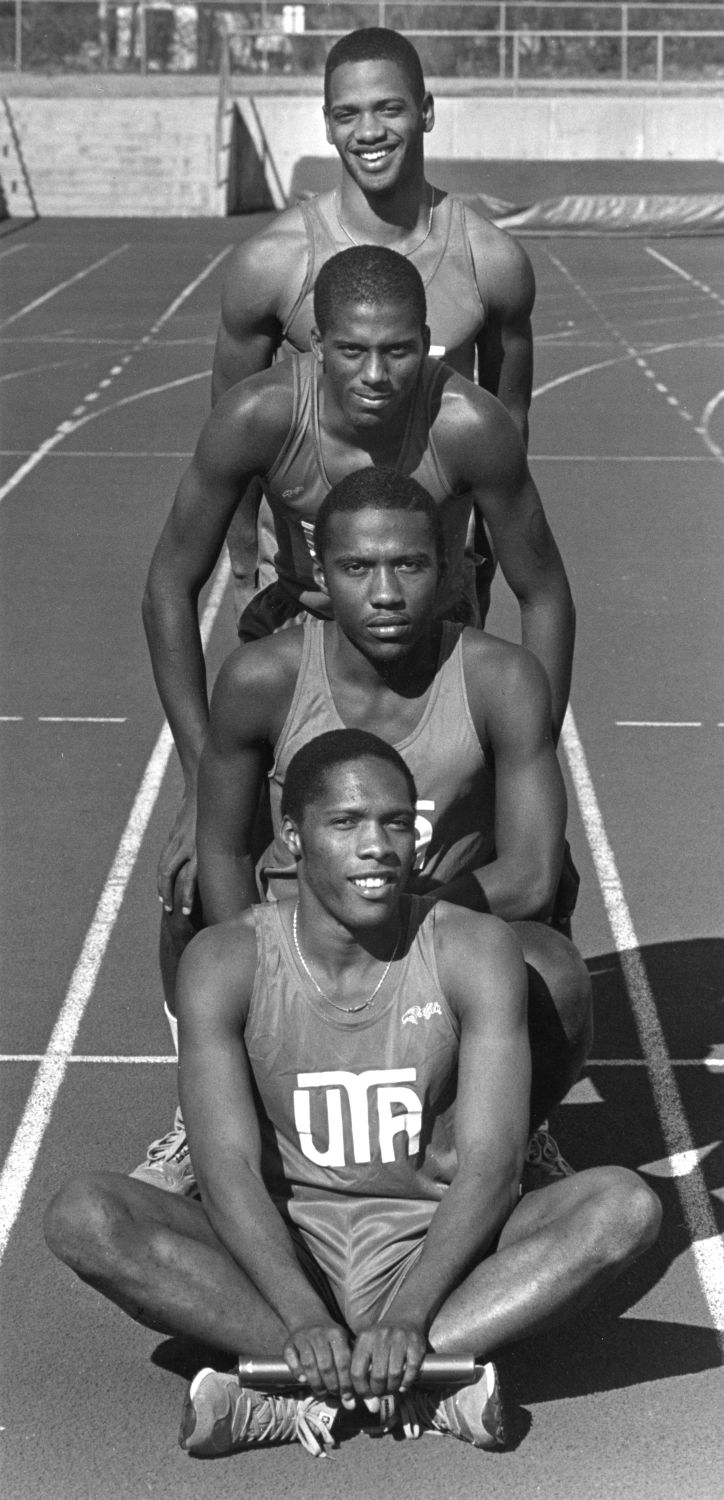
Track team of 1983

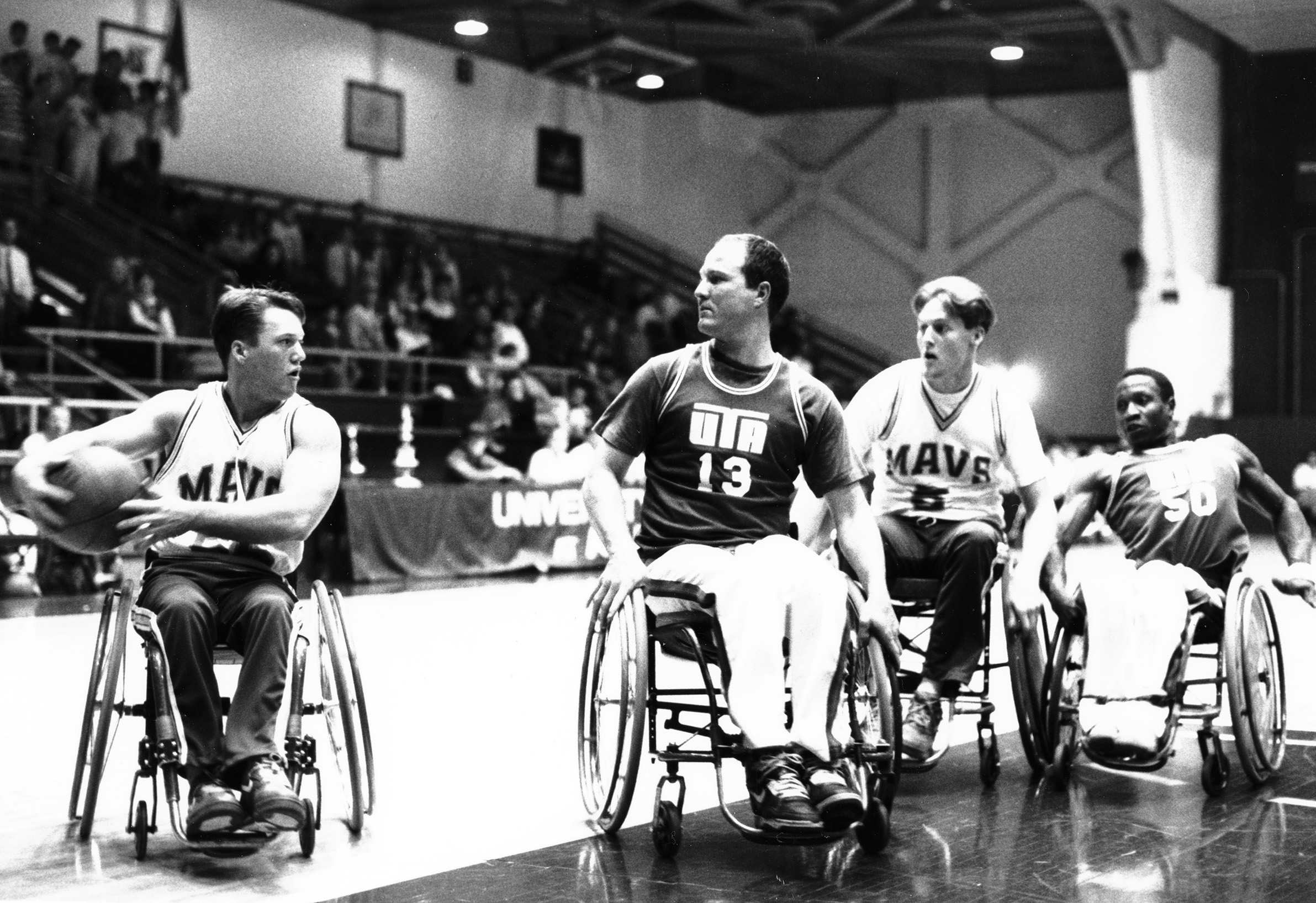
Wheelchair basketball intramural game

The men's golf team has won four Southland Conference Championships, while finishing as the runner-up eight times. During that time, they had the individual champion three times. In their lone season in the WAC, the team finished in second place while they claimed their fourth individual conference champion.

The women's golf team began varsity play in 2017/18. Their best finish was in 2019 when they finished 7th out of 11 in the Sun Belt Championship.

In track and field, the men's team has won eight outdoor and eight indoor Southland Conference championships and two indoor and three outdoor Sun Belt Conference Championships. There have been 22 total Indoor All-Americans and 52 total Outdoor All-American winners. The most recent AA's were Arthur Pederson and Bryson DeBerry in 2021. Gilbert Smith and McClinton Neal have won national titles as a member of the Mavericks squad. The women's track and field program has won six outdoor and seven indoor SLC championships. The women have placed seven Indoor All-Americans and 16 Outdoor All-Americans in their history, the most recent being Alexus Henry in 2019. Henry also won the program's lone national title in that year. The teams call Maverick Stadium their home. The facility has hosted numerous conference championship meets, as well as various regular season meets.

The men's cross country team lays claim to eight conference titles: three SLC titles, one WAC in its first year there, and four SBC, the first coming in the university's first year in the conference. Additionally, UTA has had seven individual champions. Overall, the team has earned four runner of the year's, two freshman of the year's and four coaches of the year's. Current coach John Sauerhage has won three, all in different conferences. On the women's side, the team has earned five team conference championships, three individual titles, three runner of the year's, one freshman of the year and two coach of the year's. They have finished as runner up at the conference meet eight times.

The men's tennis team has won 12 conference championships, including ten regular season championships in the Southland Conference, highlighted by a streak of 5 in 6 years from 1998 to 2003. The team claimed its first Sun Belt Championship in 2016, while getting its first WAC title in 2023. The team would repeat as both regular season and tournament champions in 2024. The women's team has seen similar success, also winning eleven championships with a streak of 6 in 7 years from 1999 to 2005. The women won two titles in the Sun Belt in their last two years, while claiming a WAC title their first year back in 2023, a combined three conference titles in a row. The UTA Tennis Center is the home for the programs.

UT Arlington has long been a powerhouse in wheelchair basketball, the Movin' Mavs men's team has won ten National Wheelchair Basketball Association intercollegiate titles while the Lady Movin' Mavs women's team has two titles. Since starting a women's team in 2013 it has quickly grown to international success: the entire starting lineup for the United States team in the 2019 Women's U25 Wheelchair Basketball World Championship consisted of UT Arlington players, along with a key starter for the Australian team, with three Lady Movin' Mavs (two from the US and the Australian starter) named to the first team all-tournament. Neither team is in the Athletics Department but are in the Physical Education Department and operate as club team.

== Venues and facilities ==
=== Current ===
Venue	Sport	Opened	Capacity	Ref.
College Park Center	Basketball; Volleyball (Note: It also houses much of the Athletic Department staff, which relocated from the Gilstrap Athletic Center at Maverick Stadium.)	Feb 2012	7,000	
Clay Gould Ballpark (Note: formerly Allan Saxe Stadium and Arlington Athletic Center)	Baseball	1974	1,600	
Allan Saxe Field	Softball	1974	622	
Maverick Stadium	Football; Track and field (Note: also leased by the Arlington Independent School District and Pantego Christian Academy for their football teams. It usually serves as the site of 1–3 high school football playoff games every year. The stadium previously served as UTA's home football stadium until the university dropped its program after the final game of the 1985 season.)	1979	12,000	
UTA Tennis Center	Tennis	n/a	n/a	

=== Former ===
Venue	Sport	Opened	Capacity	Ref.
Texas Hall	Basketball (1965–2012) (Note: After sports were moved to College Park Center in 1965, Texas Hall was used exclusively for other events such as concerts, lectures, meetings, theater, and dance.)	1965	2,625	

Notes

Gallery

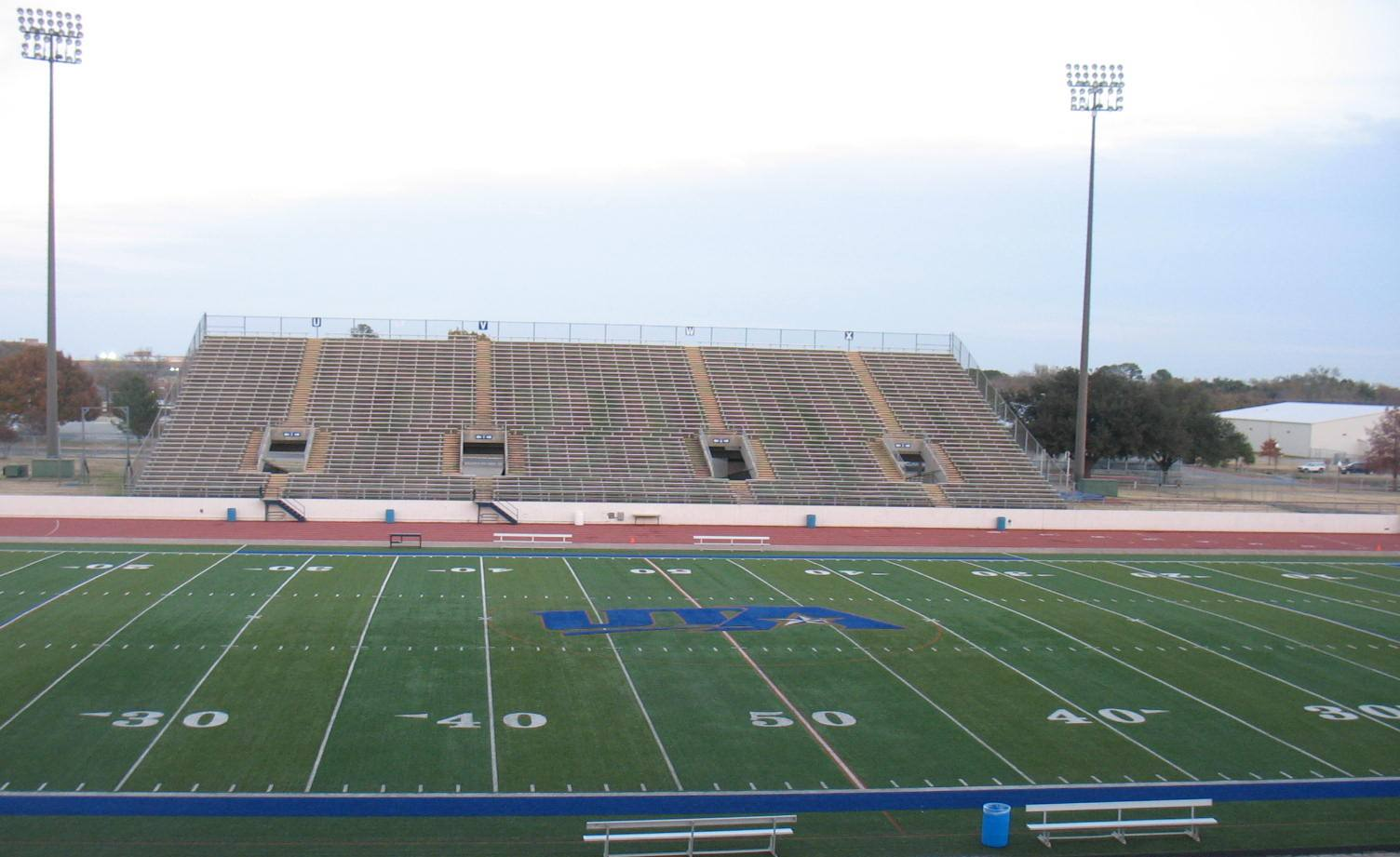
Maverick Stadium east stands

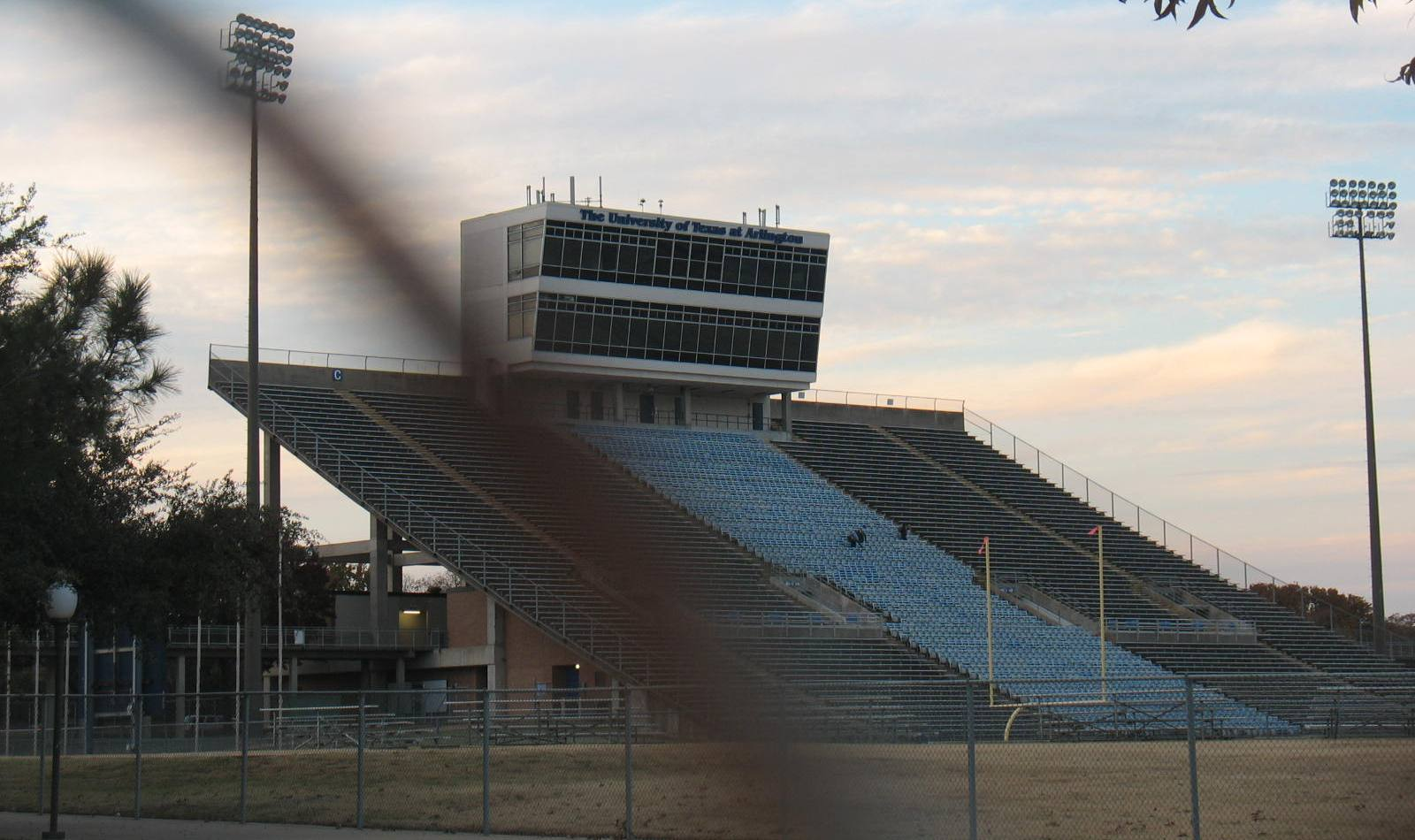
Maverick Stadium home stands

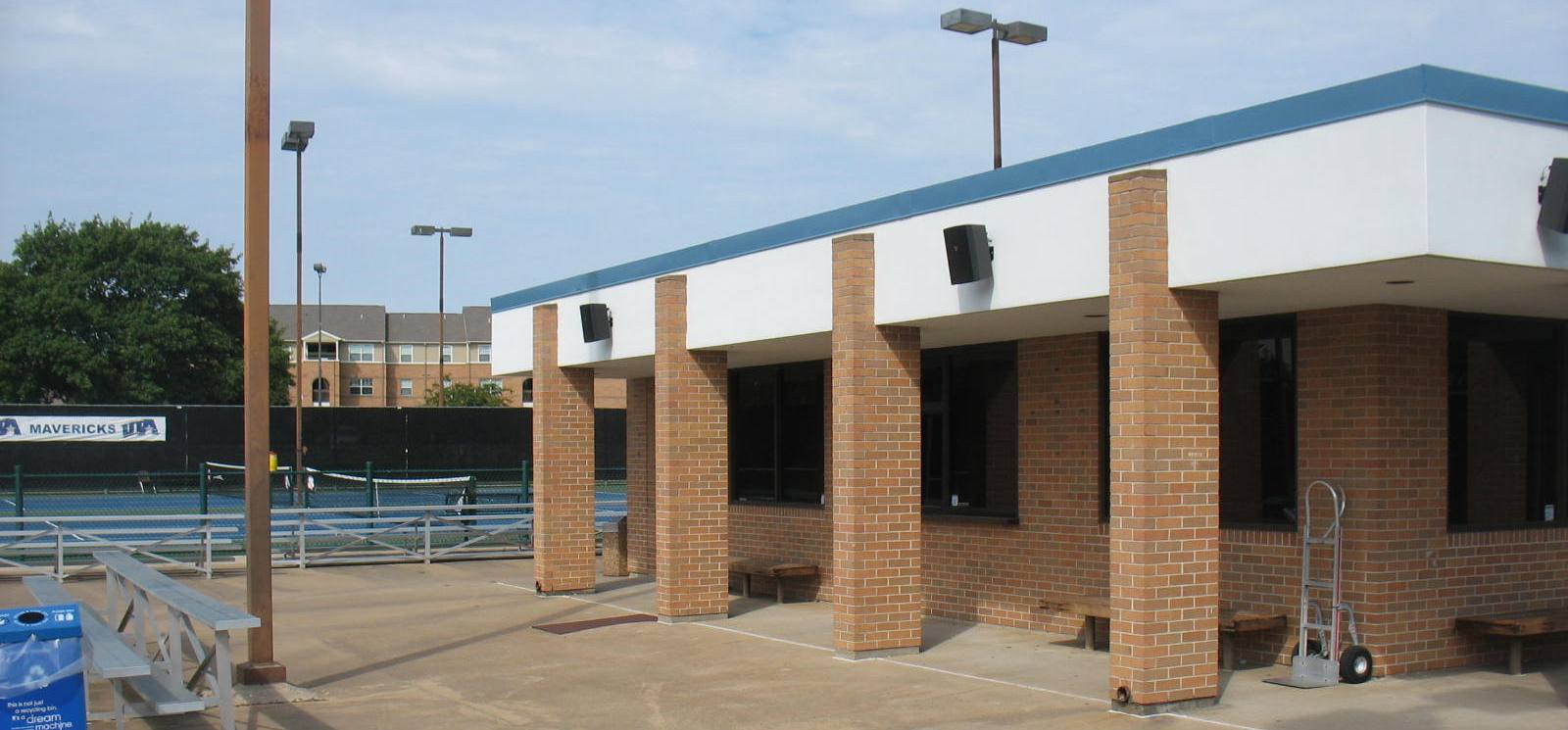
The UTA Tennis Center's pro shop

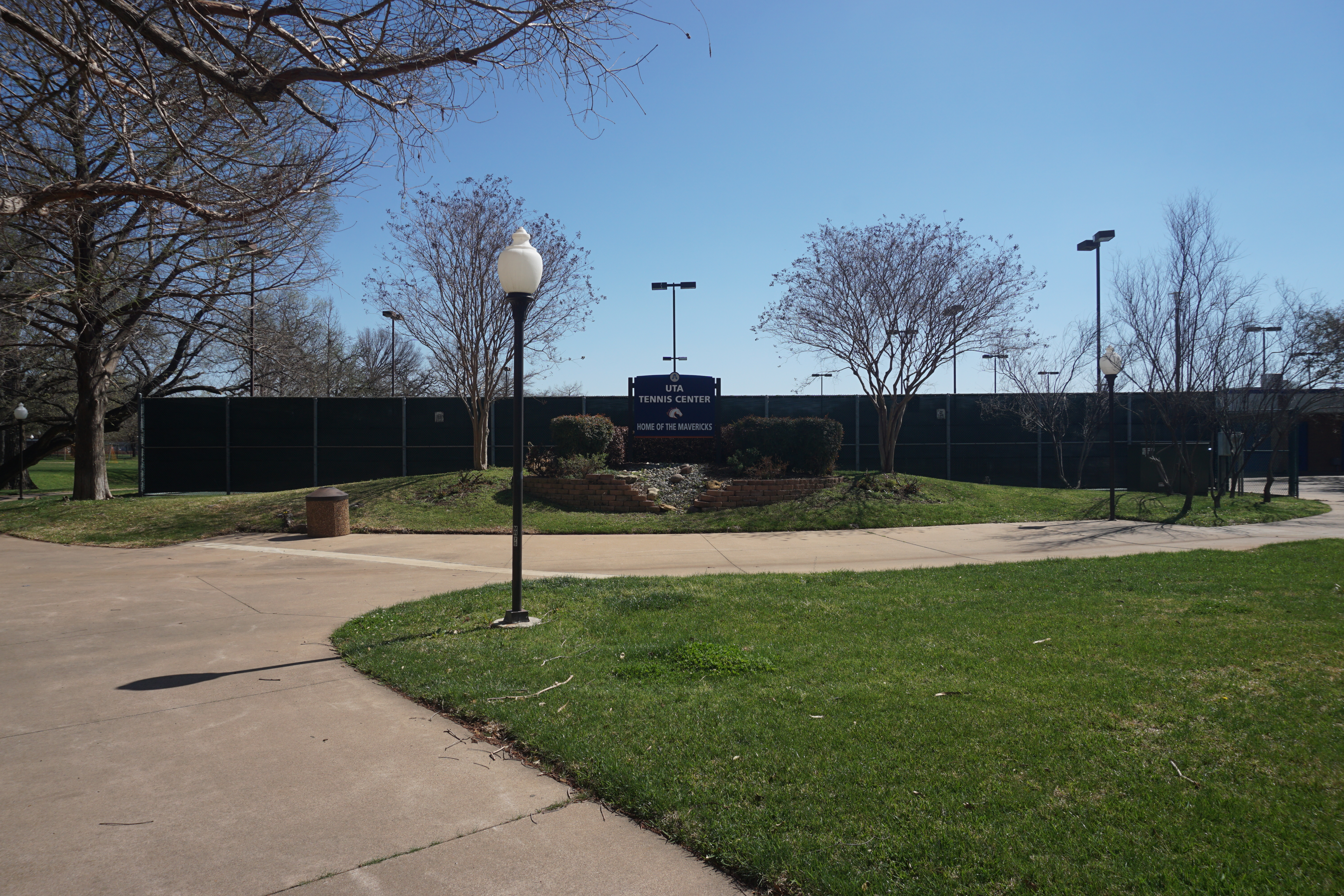
UTA Tennis Center

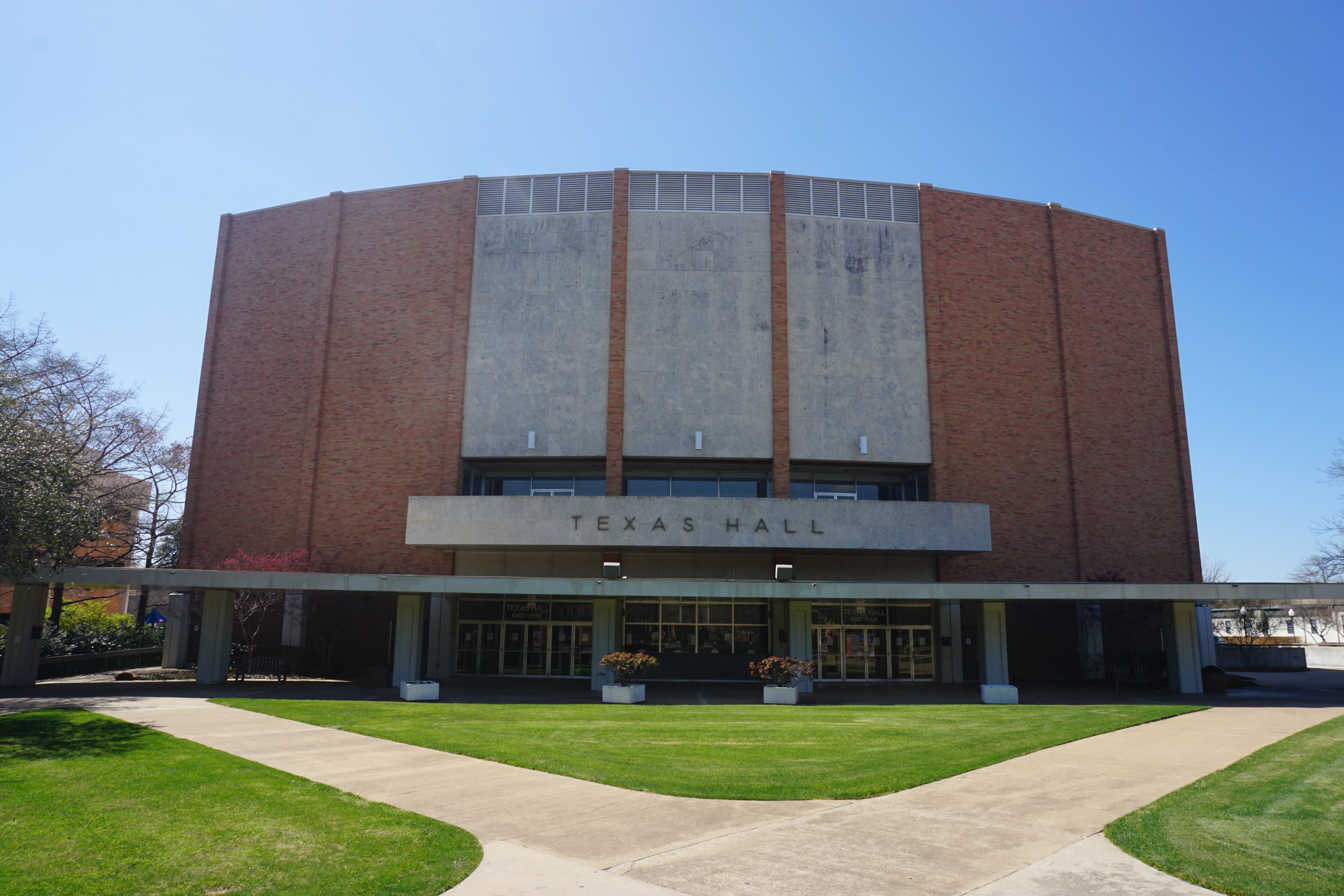
Texas Hall

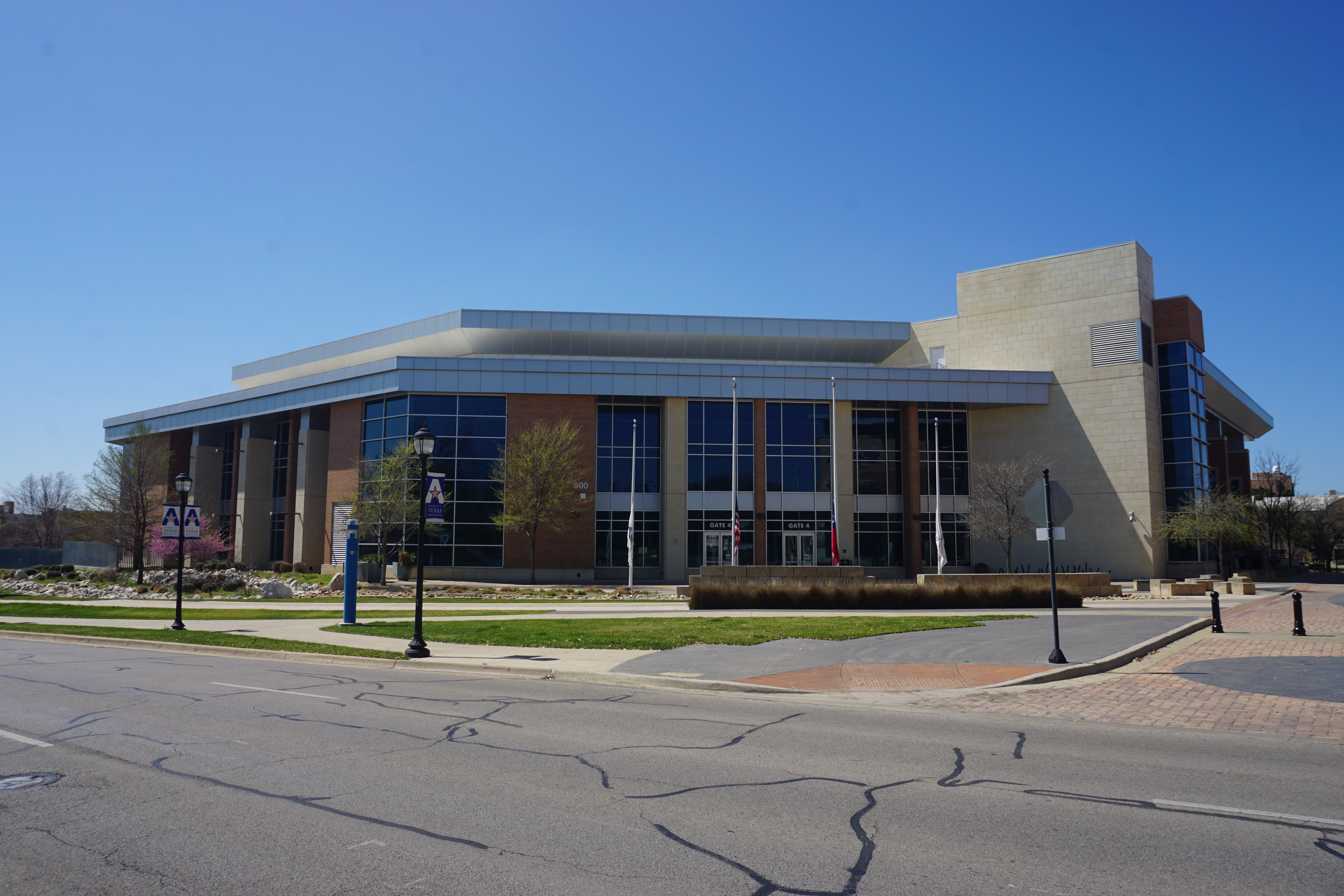
College Park Center

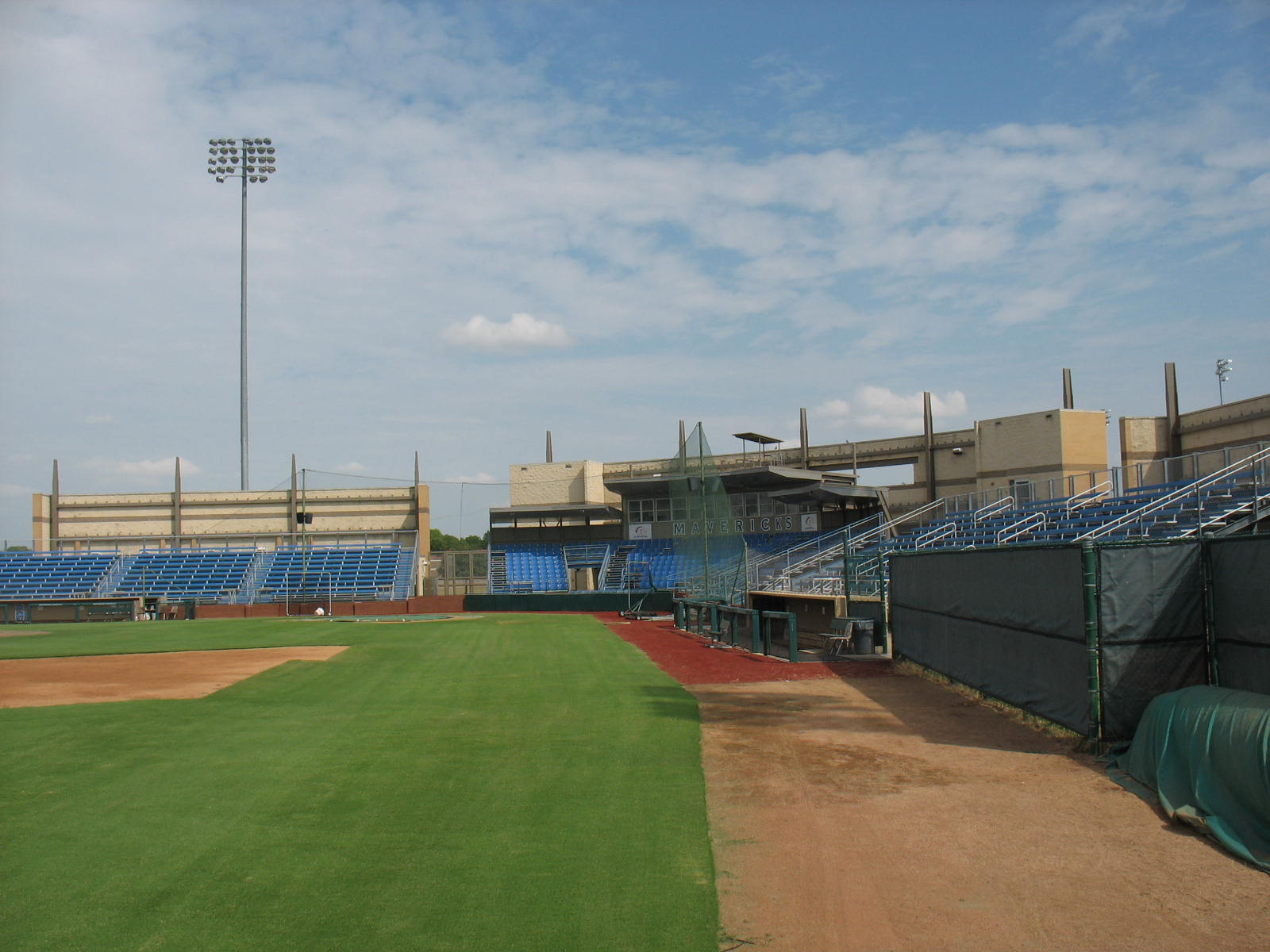
Clay Gould Park from the left field line (before renovation)

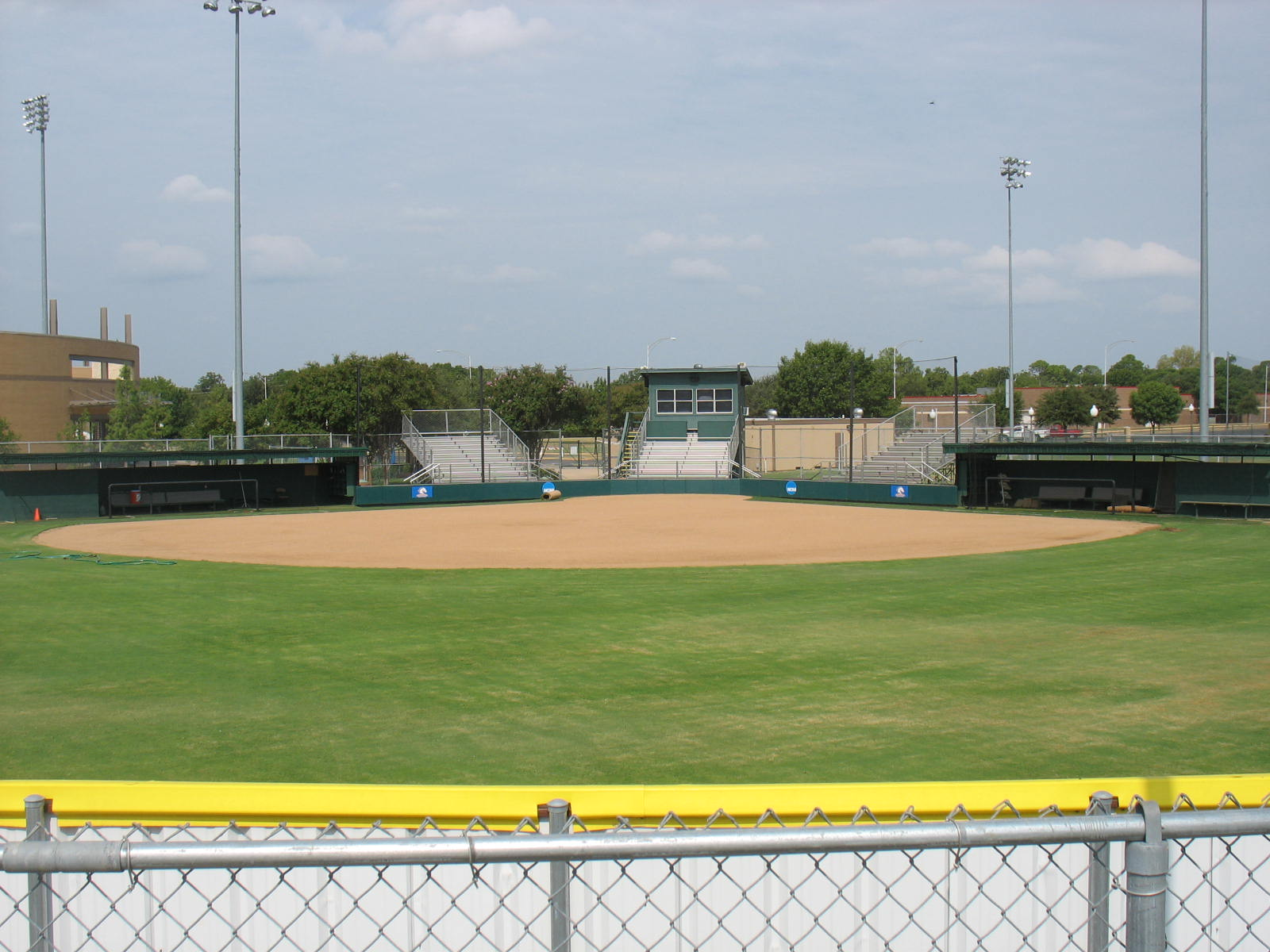
Allan Saxe Field (grandstands before renovation)

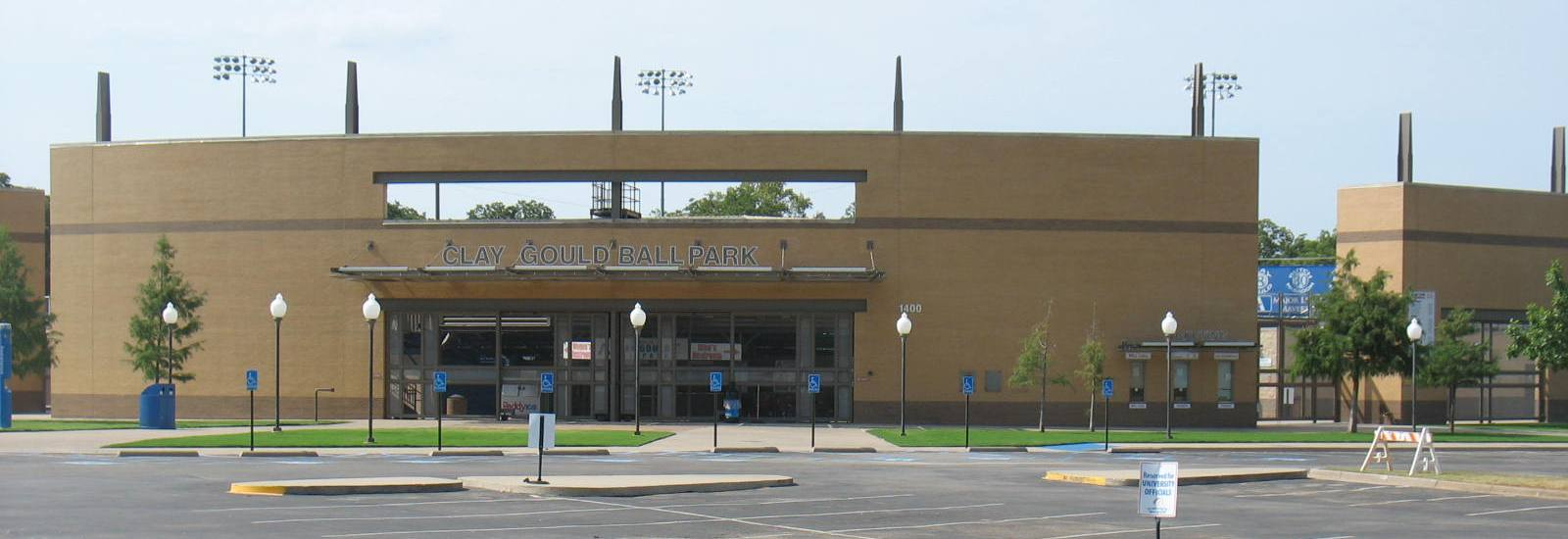
Clay Gould Park Entrance (before renovation)

== School spirit ==
The school's colors are blue and white with orange becoming more prominent. The school mascot is a horse named Blaze. UTA's former fight song, "Dixie", coincided with the school's Rebel mascot. After the mascot became more and more controversial, the fight song was changed and the current edition, the "UTA Fight Song", was established.

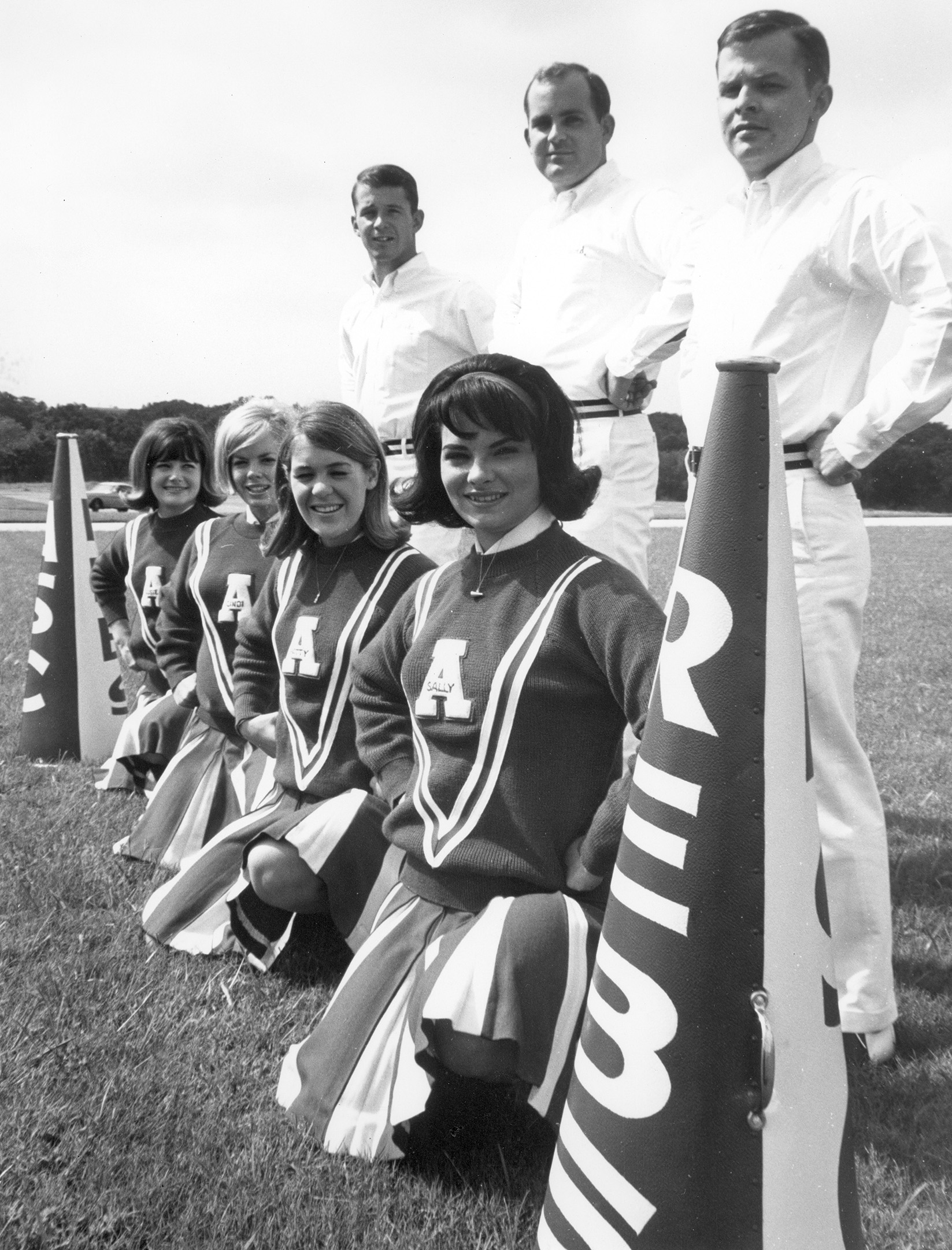
Rebels cheerleaders.

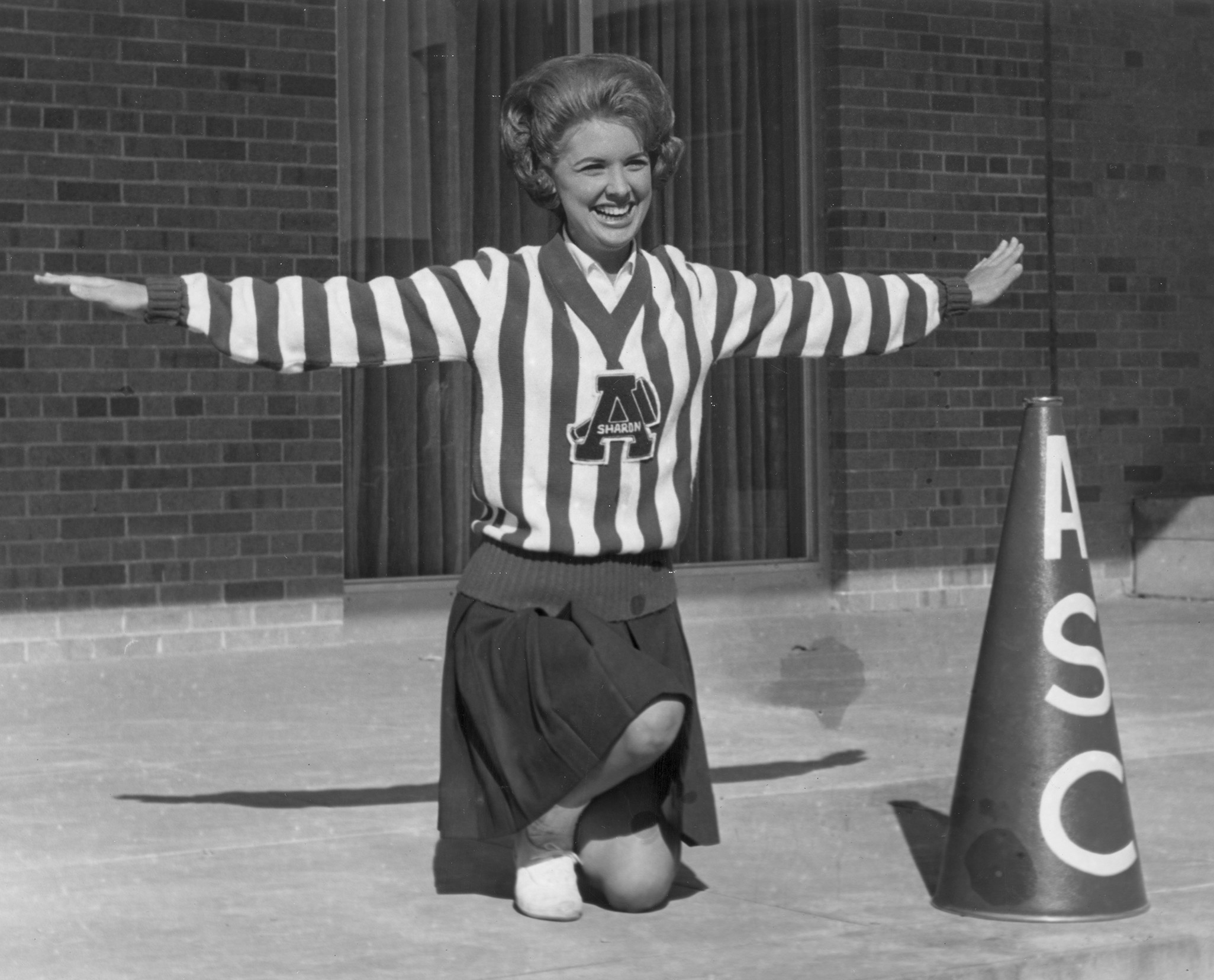
Cheerleader Sharon Terrill, fall of 1965; she moved to California and became Miss California in 1968.

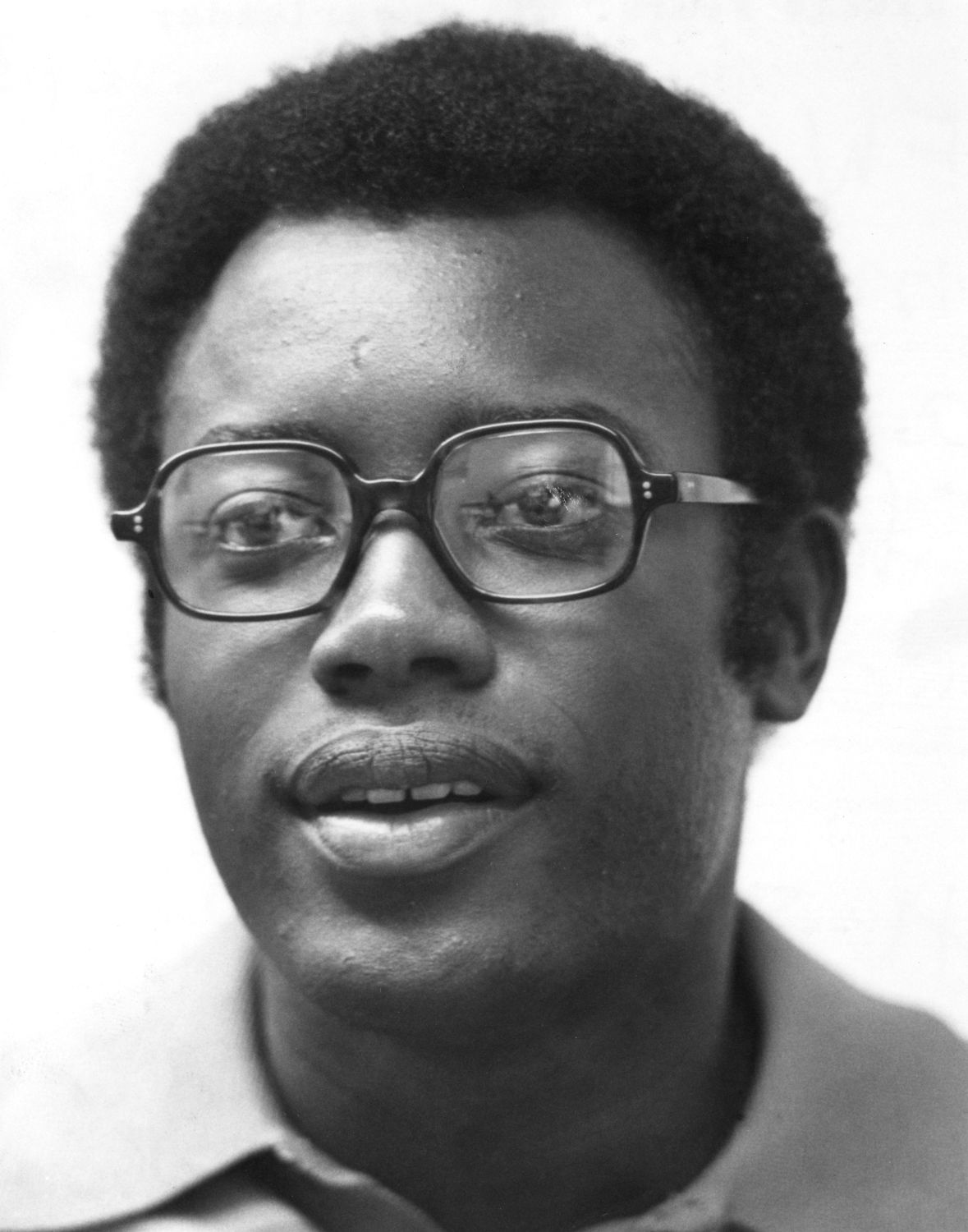
Dickie Fears, first African American cheerleader at the university, 1971.

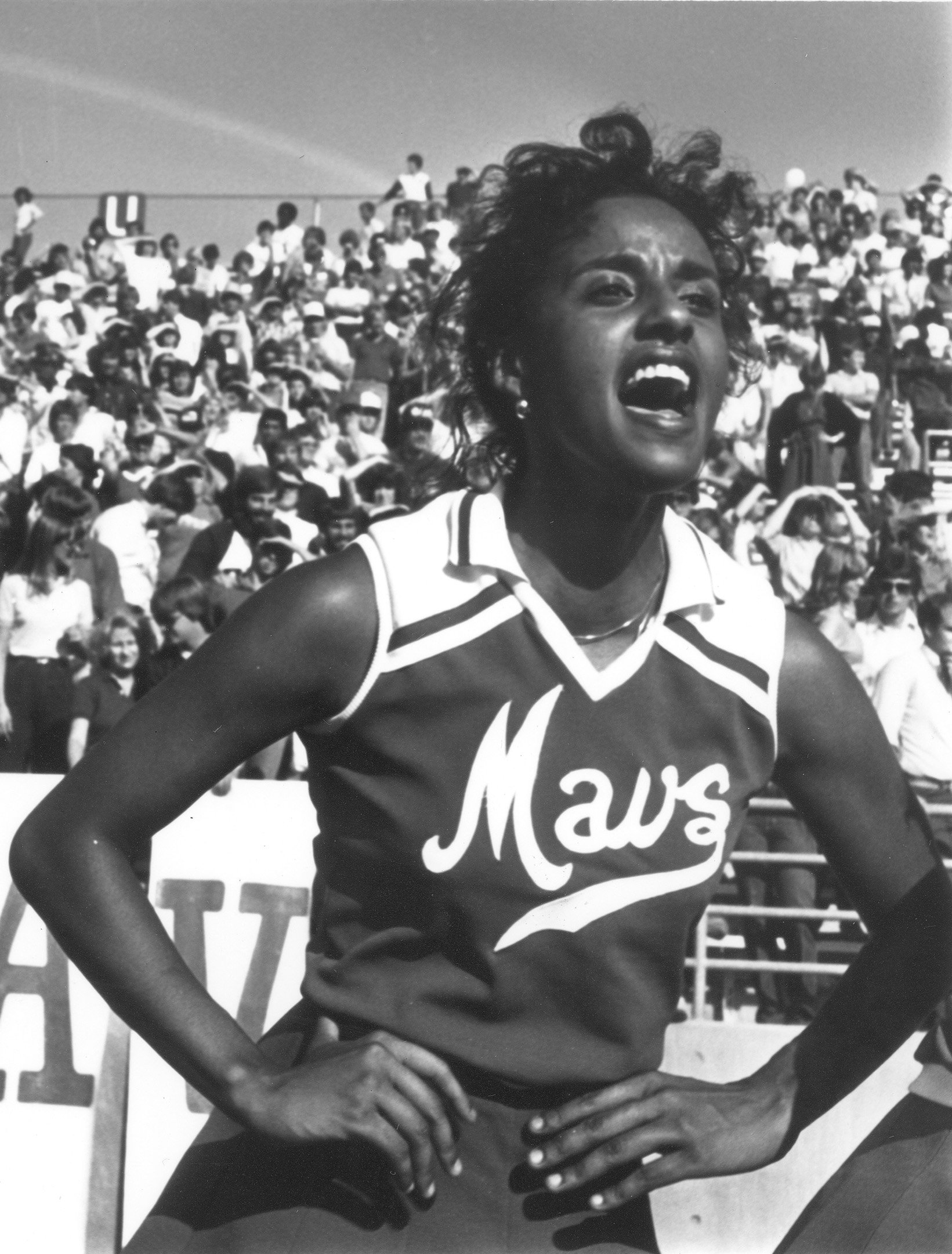
UTA cheerleader, 1982.

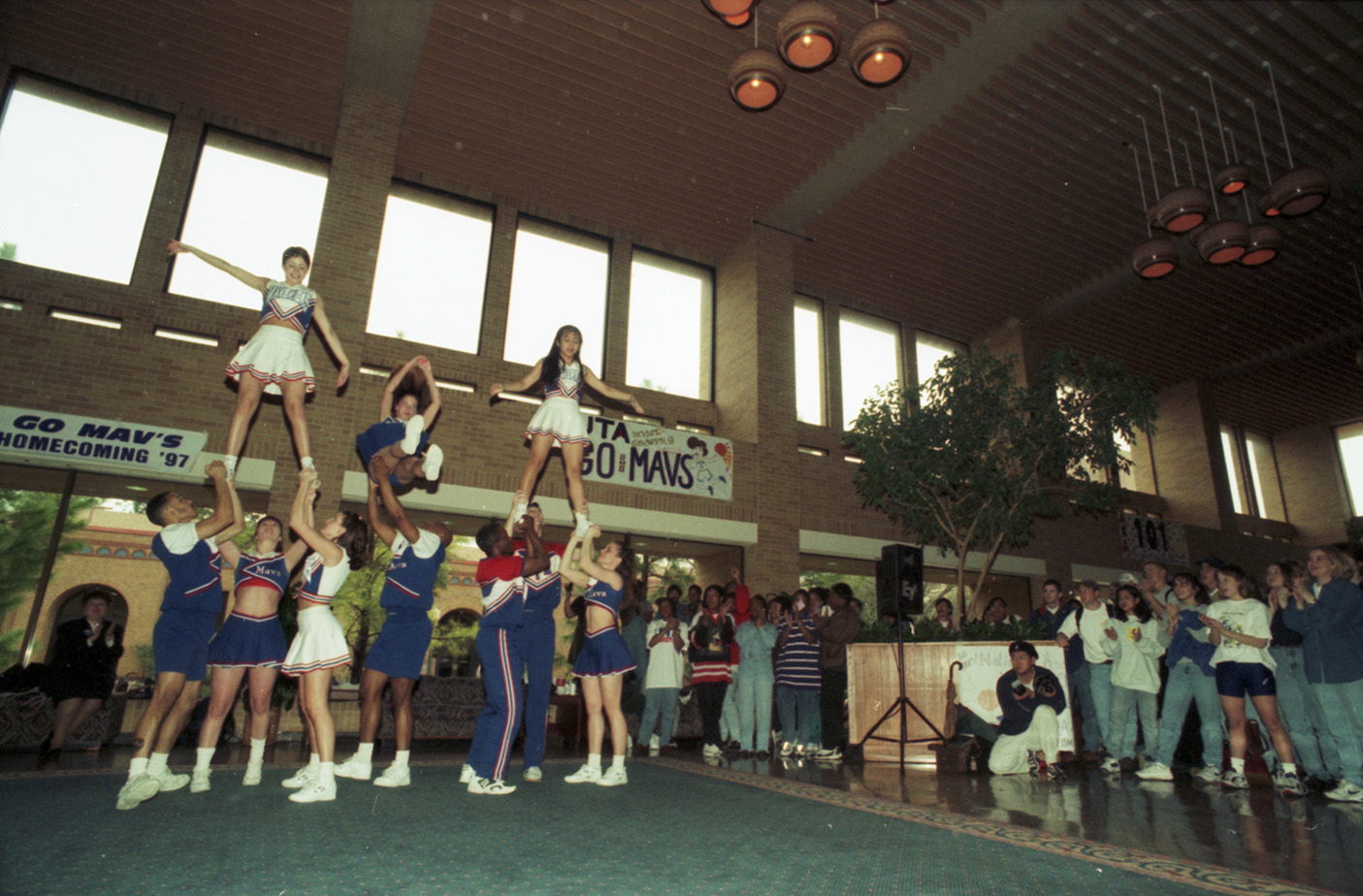
Homecoming performance at the Hereford Student Center, 1997.

== Championship history ==
=== Conference titles ===
Baseball (7)
Southland Conference
- Regular Season: 1990, 1992
- Tournament: 2001, 2006, 2012
Sun Belt Conference
- Regular Season: 2017
Western Athletic Conference
- Regular Season: 2013*

Football (3)
Southland Conference
- 1966*, 1967, 1981

Men's basketball (4)
Southland Conference
- Regular Season: 2004*, 2012,
- Tournament: 2008
Sun Belt Conference
- Regular Season: 2017

Men's cross country (8)
Southland Conference
- 1985, 1992, 1999
Sun Belt Conference
- 2013, 2015, 2016, 2018
Western Athletic Conference
- 2012

Men's golf (4)
Southland Conference
- 1995, 1999*, 2005, 2011

Men's indoor track and field (10)
Southland Conference
- 1990, 1991, 1992, 1995, 1996, 1997, 1999, 2000
Sun Belt Conference
- 2014, 2017, 2019

Men's outdoor track and field (11)
Southland Conference
- 1989, 1990, 1991, 1992, 1994, 1996, 1997, 2007
Sun Belt Conference
- 2014, 2015, 2017

Men's tennis (17)
Southland Conference
- Regular Season: 1995, 1996, 1999, 2000, 2002, 2003, 2006*, 2009*, 2010
- Tournament: 1998, 1999, 2000, 2001, 2003, 2006
Sun Belt Conference
- Tournament: 2016
Western Athletic Conference
- 2023, 2024

Softball (6)
Southland Conference
- Regular Season: 1983, 1986*, 1989, 2003, 2007
- Tournament: 2003

Volleyball (24)
Southland Conference
- Regular Season: 1982, 1983*, 1984, 1985, 1986, 1987, 1988, 1989, 1990, 1992, 1998, 2002
- Tournament: 1982, 1985, 1986, 1987, 1988, 1989, 1990, 1992, 2001, 2002
Western Athletic Conference
- Regular Season: 2024
- Tournament: 2024

Women's basketball (8)
Southland Conference
- Regular Season: 2005*, 2007*,
- Tournament: 2005, 2007
Sun Belt Conference
- Regular Season: 2019*
- Tournament: 2005, 2007, 2022

Women's cross country (5)
Southland Conference
- 1986, 1997, 2000, 2001
Sun Belt Conference
- 2014

Women's indoor track and field (7)
Southland Conference
- 1995, 1996, 1997, 1998, 1999*, 2000, 2001

Women's outdoor track and field (6)
Southland Conference
- 1991, 1995, 1998, 1999, 2000, 2001

Women's tennis (15)
Southland Conference
- Regular Season: 1999, 2000, 2001, 2002, 2004*, 2005, 2008, 2011
- Tournament: 1999, 2000, 2001, 2004, 2008, 2011
Sun Belt Conference
- Regular Season: 2021, 2022*
Western Athletic Conference
- 2023

* denotes shared conference title

=== Bowl titles ===
Pecan Bowl
- 1967

== Rivalries ==
UTA has conference rivalries with every Texas school, Abilene Christian and Tarleton St., in its current conference home. Recently, sporting events with Grand Canyon have been heated, close and well attended.

UTA maintains a relatively heated rivalry with North Texas Mean Green, though they haven't been members of the same conference since 1996. Primarily because the teams are only thirty miles apart and are the only Division I public universities in the Dallas–Fort Worth metroplex, the various sporting events between the two are some of the most attended of the year for each team. The longest standing rivalry is in men's basketball which began in 1925.

UTA still maintains a rivalry with the Texas State Bobcats, a team which had been a conference rival every year from 1987 to 2022, despite the two schools belonging to three different conferences in that time frame. As of the conclusion of UTA's tenure in the SBC, the Mavericks lead the all-time series in men's basketball (41–39), and football (2–0), while the Bobcats lead in volleyball (43–46), women's basketball (39-42), softball (64–67) and baseball (45–73). However, as time progresses from UTA's departure from the Sun Belt, only men's basketball has maintained the rivalry.

One of UTA's most anticipated baseball rivalries are with the TCU Horned Frogs. The two Tarrant County teams play annually in games that generate high attendance from both schools. 4,015 saw the UTA/TCU match-up at Globe Life Park in Arlington in 2013. Five of the top nine, and seven of the top 13, most attended games at Clay Gould Ballpark feature TCU as the visiting team.

Sports rivalries began at UT Arlington while it was a junior college known as the North Texas Agricultural College. A fierce rivalry developed in the 1930s with John Tarleton Agricultural College since both schools held junior college status in the Texas A&M system. Similar to the Aggie Bonfire tradition at the College Station campus, the host of the yearly football game between these teams built a bonfire. In 1939, two NTAC students flew a Taylorcraft Aircraft to the JTAC campus and dropped a phosphorus bomb on the bonfire to light it prematurely. While the plane was flying low after the bomb was dropped, a JTAC student was able to throw a piece of wood into the propeller and cause the plane to crash. The students were dragged from the wreckage and a 'J' was shaved into their heads. Bonfires were canceled after this event.

== Notable athletes ==
The university has produced several notable athletes.

=== Basketball ===
- Kevin Hervey - Second round 2018 NBA draft pick

=== Baseball ===
- Michael Choice – outfielder, 10th overall draft pick by the Oakland Athletics in the 2010 Major League Baseball draft
- Steve Foster – pitcher for the Cincinnati Reds
- Dillon Gee – pitcher for the New York Mets
- Trey Hillman – manager of the Kansas City Royals from 2008 to 2010
- John Lackey – pitcher for the Boston Red Sox
- Mark Lowe – pitcher for the Texas Rangers
- Adam Moore – catcher for the Seattle Mariners
- Daniel Ortmeier – first baseman/outfielder for the San Francisco Giants
- Dave Owen – shortstop for the Chicago Cubs
- Hunter Pence – outfielder for the San Francisco Giants
- Ryan Roberts – infielder for the Arizona Diamondbacks

=== Football ===
- Dexter Bussey – running back for the Detroit Lions from 1974 to 1984
- Skip Butler – kicker and punter, mostly for the Houston Oilers
- Mark Cannon – center, mostly for the Green Bay Packers
- Bruce Collie – offensive lineman for the 49ers (1985–89), where he played on Super Bowl XXIII and XXIV teams and Eagles (1990–91)
- Doug Hart – defensive back for the Green Bay Packers who played in the first two Super Bowls
- Derrick Jensen – running back and tight end for the Raiders where he played on Super Bowl XV and XVIII teams
- Tim McKyer – cornerback, played on Super Bowl XXIII, XXIV, and XXXII championship teams
- Don Morrison – offensive lineman for the New Orleans Saints
- Cliff Odom – linebacker for the Browns, Colts, and Dolphins between 1980 and 1993

=== Swimming ===
- Doug Russell – Olympic gold medalist and former world record holder
