= UTA Tennis Center =

Tennis facility in Arlington, Texas

Coordinates: 32.73192°N 97.11987°W

The UTA Tennis Center is the home of the University of Texas at Arlington men's and women's tennis teams. The facility is located near the intersection of Summit Avenue and Greek Row Drive on the UTA campus. Several apartment buildings, constructed by the university, surround the center.

== Features ==
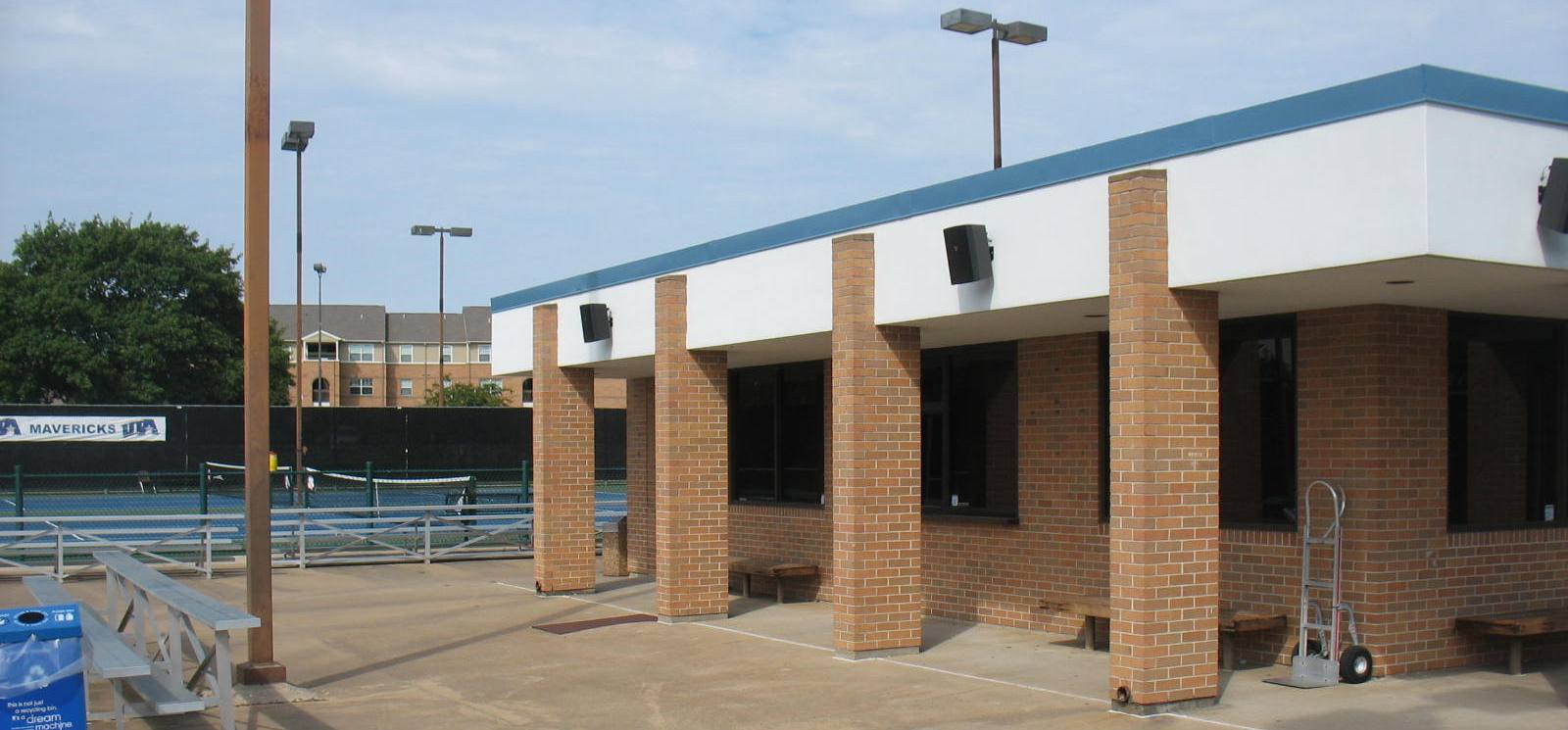
The UTA Tennis Center's pro shop

In the middle of the UTA Tennis Center sits the pro shop, which also contain the spectator amenities. Directly in front of the pro shop are six courts, while two sit on each side of the pro shop, for a total of ten hard courts. The facility has a seating capacity of 150 spectators, composed primarily of aluminum bleachers spread throughout the venue. Lighting allows for matches to be played at night. A chain link fence with mesh netting surround to entire venue.

UTA is the owner and operator of the center.

Other than being the home of UTA's men's and women's teams, the UTA Tennis Center also plays host to a variety of tournaments on a local and national scale. The Intercollegiate Tennis Association (ITA) and United States Tennis Association (USTA) frequently hold tournaments at the UTA Tennis Center for a variety of age and skill groups.

== Renovations ==
In 2019, the court surfaces to the venue were resurfaced. Additionally, the pro shop received a minor, interior update to modernize the building. A year later in 2020, locker rooms were added to the pro shop. In subsequent years, a scoreboard was added for the first time.

== History ==
The UTA Tennis Center was built in the early 1980s, shortly after the men's tennis team was resuscitated at the varsity level. The USTA awarded the UTA Tennis one of the top facilities in Texas in 1986.

In 2012, the courts were remodeled where blue courts replaced the green ones.

Two courts were subtracted from the UTA Tennis Center when the university began to construct many apartments in the area.

The UTA Tennis Center has hosted the Southland Conference men's and women's tennis tournament in 1996, 1999, 2000, 2003 and 2006.
