= Gifty Osei Boakye Bingley =

Ghanaian media personality

- Citizenship: Ghana
- Education: Ghana institute of journalism
- Occupation: Journalist

Gifty Osei Boakye Bingley is a former Ghanaian television journalist and news broadcaster who is currently a Communications and Strategy Executive. She formerly worked for Tigo Ghana, as the Director of Corporate Communications and Corporate Responsibility.

== Education ==
Gifty graduated from the Ghana Institute of Journalism (GIJ) with a bachelor's degree in journalism and a master's degree in political communication from the University of Leeds and a master's degree in development management from the Ghana Institute of Management and Public Administration (GIMPA). She is also a member of the Charted Institute of Public Relations (CIPR) in the United Kingdom.

== Career ==
Gifty Osei Boakye Bingley is currently employed by the African Union as a Senior Communications officer, where she holds the role of Head of Public Information and Senior Communications Officer. She joined AMISOM, a multi-dimensional non-profit peace assistance operation mandated by the African Union Peace and Security Council (AU PSC) and the United Nations Security Council, in July 2018.

=== At TV3 ===
Gifty also spent ten years at TV3, where she worked her way up from Broadcast Journalist to Head of News and Deputy Editor-Assignments, producing and managing programming for the various news bulletins.
