= Addie =

Addie is a unisex given name, nickname, and surname. Notable people and characters with the name or nickname include:

== Given name ==
- Addie Aylestock (1909–1998), Canadian minister in the British Methodist Episcopal Church, the first woman minister to be ordained in that church, and the first black woman to be ordained in Canada
- Addie L. Ballou (1838–1916), American suffragist, poet, artist, author, and lecturer
- Addie Cherry (1864–1942), one of the three Cherry Sisters, who performed a vaudeville act
- Addie E. Citchens, American writer
- Addie Mae Collins, one of four children killed in the 1963 16th Street Baptist Church bombing, perpetrated by members of the Ku Klux Klan
- Addie Worth Bagley Daniels (1869–1943), American suffragist leader and writer
- Addie Elizabeth Davis (1917–2005), American Southern Baptist religious leader
- Addie Whiteman Dickerson (1878–1940), American businesswoman, politician, clubwoman, suffragist, and peace activist
- Addie Garwood Estes (1868–1928), U.S. temperance activist
- Addie Graham (1890–1978), American folk singer
- Addie Harris, a member of the 1960s American girl group The Shirelles
- Addie Waites Hunton (1866–1943), American suffragist, race and gender activist, writer, political organizer, and educator
- Addie McPhail (1905–2003), American film actress, third wife of Fatty Arbuckle
- Addie Morrow (1928–2012), politician in Northern Ireland
- Addie MS (Addie Muljadi Sumaatmadja) (born 1959), Indonesian conductor
- Addie Jenne, American politician who assumed office in 2009
- Addie Joss (1880–1911), American baseball pitcher
- Addie Pearl Nicholson (1931–2022), American artist
- Addie Pryor (born 1929), British alpine skier
- Addie C. Strong Engle (1845–1926), American author and publisher
- Addie Donnell Van Noppen (1870–1964), American historian
- Addie Wagenknecht (born 1981), American artist and researcher
- Addie Walsh (born 1953), American television soap opera writer
- Addie Anderson Wilson (1876–1966), American composer, organist, and carillonist
- Addie L. Wyatt (1924–2012), African labor leader and civil rights activist

== Nickname ==
- Adriane "Addie" Hall (died 2006), murder-suicide victim featured in Ethan Brown's 2009 book Shake the Devil Off: A True Story of the Murder that Rocked New Orleans
- Addie Joss (1880–1911), American Major League Baseball Hall-of-Fame pitcher
- Adam Lile (1885–1954), New Zealand rugby footballer in the 1900s
- Addie McCain (born 1999), American soccer player
- Addie Dickman Miller (1859–1936), American college professor and founder of Ruskin, Florida
- Addie Tambellini (1936–2004), Canadian ice hockey player

== Surname ==
- Bob Addie (1910–1982), American newspaper sportswriter
- Robert Addie (1960–2003), English actor
- Kim Addonizio (born Kim Addie in 1954), American poet and novelist, daughter of Bob and Pauline Addie
- Pauline Betz Addie (1919–2011), American tennis player

== Fictional characters ==
- Addie Bundren, a main character in the 1930 novel As I Lay Dying by William Faulkner
- Addie Horton, on the American soap opera Days of Our Lives
- Addie Singer, the main character of the American television series Unfabulous
- a character in the British 1940s comic strip series Addie and Hermy (1939–1941)
- Addie, in the 1971 novel Addie Pray, the 1973 movie adaptation Paper Moon (played by Tatum O'Neal) and the 1974 television series Paper Moon (played by Jodie Foster)
- Addie Carle, in the book series The Misfits, by James Howe
- Addie, one of the main characters in "What's Left of Me" by Kat Zhang
- Addie LaRue, the main character of the novel The Invisible Life of Addie LaRue by V. E. Schwab

== See also ==
- Addy (surname)
- Addy Pross (born 1945), Israeli chemistry professor and author
- Addy Walker, a doll from the American Girl series
- Adye, a surname and given name
