= Waist beads =

Traditional African jewelry piece worn around the waist

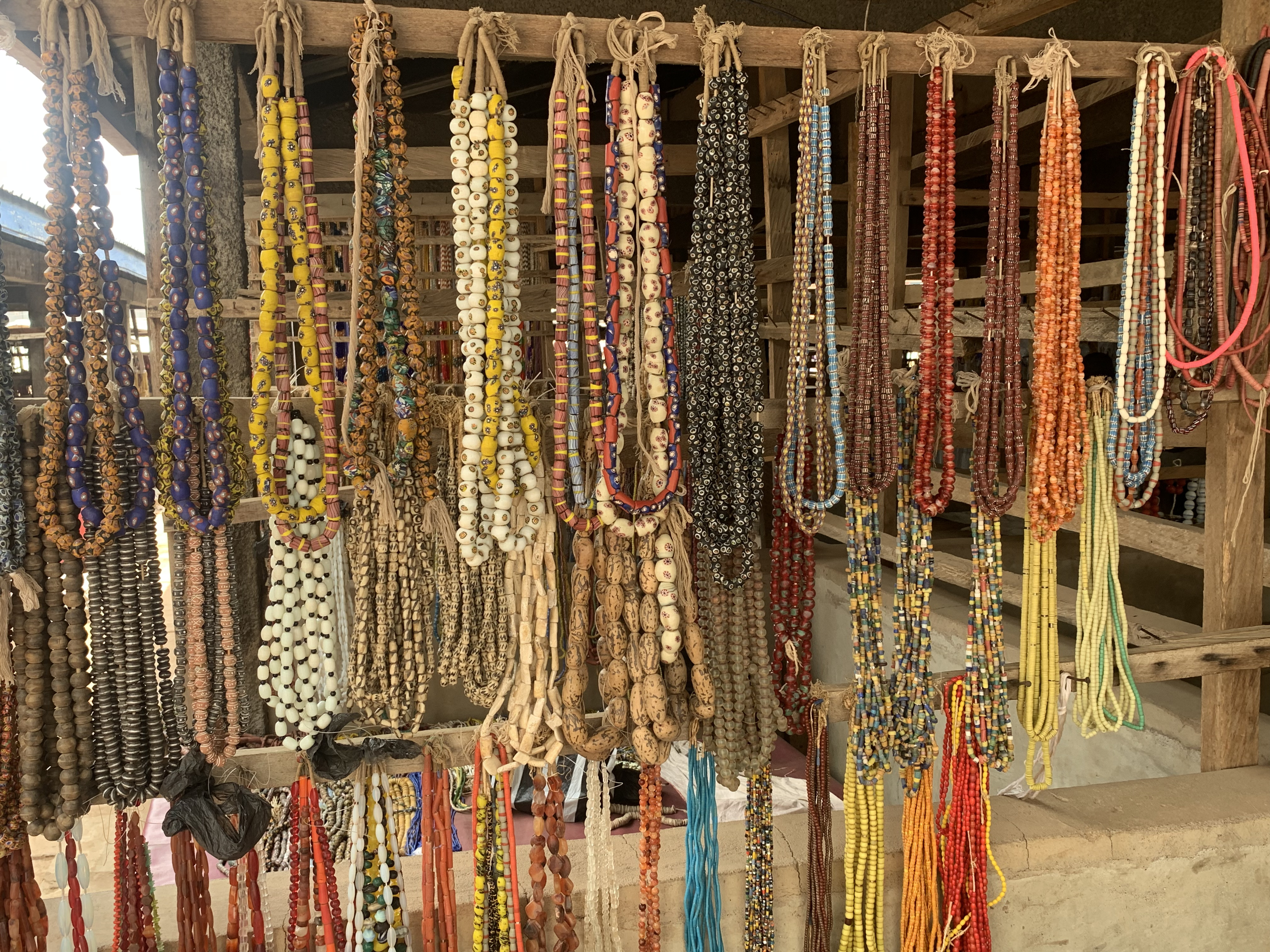
Waist beads

Waist beads are a type of jewelry worn around the waist or hips and commonly worn in West Africa and North Africa. The beads are often made from materials such as glass, seeds, metal, crystals, gemstones, decorative charms, wood, or plastics. They are typically strung on cotton thread, twine, wire, cord elastic and non-elastic cords. The construction, design and style of wearing may vary across different cultural traditions.

== Purpose ==
The purpose of waist beads worn by its wearer are for a variety of symbolic, cultural and individual purposes. They are worn by women and may symbolize beauty, sexuality, femininity, fertility, well-being or maturity. Waist beads function as symbolic and cultural objects in some African societies and are associated with femininity, beauty practices, fertility narratives, and personal identity construction.

The colors and materials have a strong symbolic, cultural, or personal connection to its wearer. The culture or beliefs of the wearer determine when the beads are worn or taken off. Waist beads are commonly used for health tracking, such as weight loss. Waist beads are often given to a young woman by her mother to mark her transition into womanhood and her sexuality.

Each culture's beliefs determine whether the beads are only intended to be seen by the woman's husband or not. In some cultures, there is a belief that waist beads have a sexual aspect to them and can help attract a partner. They are also believed to help develop a woman's curves and slim her waist because they do not stretch.

=== Uses ===
- Fashion statement: many people today wear waist beads as a piece of body jewelry or an accessory.
- Weight control: others use the waist bead to measure their waist size and over time the band will fall or roll up due to weight loss or weight gain.
- Culture: there are a variety of meanings for waist beads in different cultures such as maturity and sexual attraction. Cultures that traditionally utilize waist beads include the Egyptian culture, Ghana, Yoruba, Ewe, Ashanti, Krobo, Ga-Adangbe, and others.
- Spirituality: those who are practicing the awareness of the spirit use the waist beads for personal performances

== Origins ==
Waist beads originate from Ancient Egypt (Kemet), often referred to as "girdles". The earliest waist beads found are from 5,000 years ago in the Predynastic period.

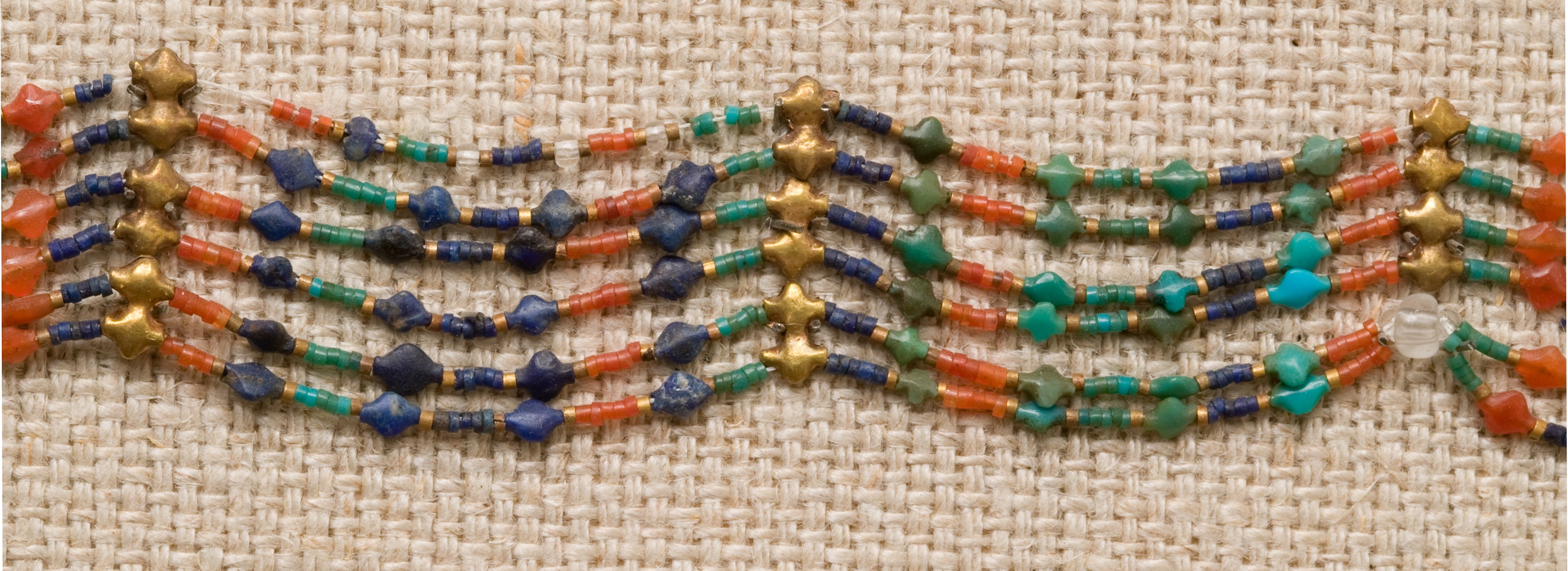
Ancient Egyptian waist beads

Waist beads are associated with symbols of status and cultural identity. Within bead trade works, materials used includes gems, chains, wire, thread, and shells in a variety of color. Today, waist beads continue to be worn across many African cultures. Including among the Egyptians, Ghanaians, Senegalese, Igbos, Yorubas, Ewes, Ashantis, Krobos, Swahilis, Mijikenda and Ga-Adangbes peoples. Each culture has its own reasons for wearing waist beads. In many African cultures, waist beads are commonly given to young women around the time they go through puberty. Ancient Egyptians are the first Africans to create metal beads and string them. Ancient Yorubas are the first Africans who independently created glass and made glass beads with them. Corals and other materials are also used for bead making.

=== Ghanaian culture ===
In Ghanaian culture, women begin to wear waist beads as they age and on orders from their mothers. Beads are a part of the rite of passage during puberty, which is associated with fertility and marriage. This symbolizes maturity and the beginning of womanhood. The initiation ceremony held for a young woman is called Dipo, during which beads are worn on the neck, ankles, and waist. Waist beads are often worn to represent luck and are commonly made of seeds, seashells, glass pieces, teeth, ivory, and stones. They are often hand-painted. The size of the waist beads is said to signify a woman's level of sexual maturity. In some traditions, waist beads are considered intimate and personal and are not supposed to be seen by anyone except the person's significant other. Today, waist beads are also used as a fashion statement.

=== Egyptian ===
Waist beads in Egypt dates back to 3200 BC and was worn by both men and women, though predominantly women. These waist beads were made of gold, gemstones, shells, glass, metal, and sometimes bells post-menstruation. These beads served as status symbols, celebrations of the female form, protection against negative energy, promotion of spiritual wellbeing, fertility, female sexual maturity and rites of passage, and personal fashion and adornment. While associated with women, some male mummies have been found wearing girdles/waist beads.

Nowadays, waist beads are worn for fashion purposes or as raqs baladi (bellydancing) belts, known as hezam raqs.

Beaded belts and strands of beads worn around the hips (often in a netted pattern) have also been used in Egyptian zar, sometimes with bead fringe attached. The bead colors on these sometimes corresponded to specific spirits, and these beads were sometimes a part of sets that included necklaces, headdresses, caps, and ceremonial sticks. These beaded items are only worn durng ceremonies, unlike other zar jewelry that is worn all the time.

=== Igbo ===
The use of waist beads in Igbo culture dates back many years and has been worn by both men and women across all social classes. Waist beads, known as Mgbájí in Igbo language, are commonly used during festivities and traditional ceremonies, and are popular among young girls and married women. They are usually made with materials such as copper, coral, beads, and stones, and held together with string or wire. More than one string is usually worn at a time. Although nowadays waist beads are mostly worn only for traditional Igbo ceremonies such as Igba nkwu (traditional marriage), it is still possible to find these waist beads in the homes of some elderly Igbo women. Traditionally, Mgbájí is one of the essential items a groom must present to his bride, as the bride's wedding attire is incomplete without them. Additionally, the beads were pleasing to watch as the bride danced towards her new husband. Waist beads in Igbo culture symbolize wealth, fertility, and femininity.

=== Yoruba ===
The Yoruba people refer to waist beads as Ileke, ibebe idi, Jigida, and Lagidigba. They are both a piece of jewelry and a part of their spirituality. Beads are often made from glass, nuts, wood, or metal and come in varying sizes and colors. In Yoruba culture, waist beads are a part of the rite of passage for young women. As a young woman outgrows her beads, she receives newer ones, which are worn as symbols of confidence, femininity, fertility, and well-being. Waist beads are worn for posture, beauty, weight tracking, protection, growth, sexual desire, and other reasons. In addition, waist beads can represent royalty and social standing, depending on the price and quality of the beads. Women of royalty usually wear more expensive and rare beads to distinguish themselves from others.

=== Hausa ===
The Hausa ethnic group is the largest tribe in present-day Nigeria. The use of beads on different parts of the body by men, women, the young and the old dates back to hundreds of decades. The Hausa are very aesthetic-minded and tend to wear beads around the ankles, necks, wrists, waist, etc. Waist beads among the Hausa are referred to as Jigida. It is common to see newborn females with beads around their waist. Typical Hausa beads are usually tinier than most, and are made of plastic, wood, bones, cowries and shells. In Hausa culture, there are claims that beads can be used to ward off evil, preserving virginity, and protecting girls from getting raped. They are also worn for adornment, enhancing femininity and sensuality.

== Production ==
Traditionally, when making waist beads, the first step is to define the purpose. The purpose of the beads helps to determine the materials, colors, and sizes of the beads. Next, waist or hip measurements are taken, and the string is cut to size accordingly. Before adding the beads, a clasp is added to the end of the string so that the beads can be easily put on. On the opposite end of the string, chain loops are added to connect the clasp. Then, bead colors and materials are chosen, and the designer can select the pattern that the beads will follow and add them to the string. Lastly, the waist beads are sealed either with a clamp, a tight knot, a crimp lock, or may be burned together firmly. Then, the waist beads are ready for wearing.

Due to their recent popularity, many small businesses and shops now sell waist beads.
