= Gã-Dangme =

Ethnic group in West Africa

Coordinates: 5.5877°N 0.0996°W

Ga-Dangbe Gã-Dangbɛ
Total population
- c. 2 million

Regions with significant populations
- Greater Accra and Eastern Regions of Ghana; Togo; United Kingdom; Germany; Brazil; United States of America and Canada

Languages
- Ga and Dangme (natively); also: Twi; English; French; Portuguese

Religion
- Christianity; African traditional religions; Islam

Related ethnic groups
- Akan • Ewe • Guan • Afro-Caribbean • African Americans • Gold Coast Euro-Africans

The Ga-Dangme, Gã-Dangbe or Gã-Dangme, also spelled Gã-Dangbɛ, Ga-Dangbe or Ga-Dangme, or less properly Ga-Adangme or Ga-Adangbe, are an ethnic group in Ghana, Togo, and Benin. They comprise the Ga (Gã or Gan) and Dangbe (or Dangme) subgroups, who speak closely related languages. The Gã-Dangmes live primarily in the Greater Accra Region of Ghana, which includes the capital city of Ghana, Accra.

The Dangme people occupy the coastal area of Ghana from Kpone to Ada, on the Volta River and South Atlantic Ocean along the Gulf of Guinea and inland along the Volta River. The Dangme people include the Ada, Kpone, Krobo, Ningo, Osudoku, Prampram, and Shai, all speaking Dangbe of the Kwa branch of the Niger-Congo family of languages. About 70% of land in the Greater Accra Region is owned by the Dangmes located in Dangme East and Dangme West Districts of Ghana. Also, in the Eastern Region and Volta Region of Ghana, about 15% of land belongs to the Dangme People. These are mainly in the Manya Krobo and Yilo Krobo Districts of the Eastern Region in the Agotime Area of Volta Region and the Dangme Area in the southern part of Togo.

== History ==
Under their leader King Ayi Kushi (Cush) (1483–1519) Ga people were led from the east across several states before reaching Accra, Ghana. King Ayi Kushi also passed down seven puritan laws that form the basis and philosophy of their culture. According to oral traditions, the Ga came from the region of Lake Chad and reached Accra in the 16th century. It is also believed that by the 17th century they traveled down the River Niger and crossed the Volta to reach present day Ghana.

The Ga people were organized into six independent towns (Accra (Ga Mashie), Osu, La, Teshie, Nungua, and Tema). Each town had a stool, which served as the central object of Ga ritual and war magic. Accra became the most prominent Ga-Dangme town and is now the capital and largest city of Ghana.

== Culture ==
Dangme occupations are fishing, trading and farming which is based on the Huza system. This was an early and innovative form of capitalism where an elaborate system of property ownership was established and subsequently shared. In this system a huge tract of land is acquired by a group of people but represented by a prominent member of the group, the group were usually members of an extended family; the land is subdivided among them according to the amount each has paid, and each individual thereafter has complete control of his own section. Negotiations with the seller are carried out by an elected Huzatse ("father of the Huza"), who later acts as the Huza leader and representative. Millet was formerly the staple food, but more common crops now include cassava, yams, corn (maize), plantain, cocoa, and palm oil. Lineage members generally return to the traditional lineage home from the Huza farms several times a year to participate in the festivals of their lineage gods. There are also many annual festivals.

The Ga-Dangme are organized into clans based on patrilineal descent; the clans are subdivided into localized patrilineages, the basic units of the Ga-Dangme historical, political, cultural tribal group.

The Ga people were originally farmers, but today fishing and trading in imported goods are the principal occupations. Trading is generally controlled by women, and a husband has no control over his wife's money. Succession to most offices held by women and inheritance of women's property are by matrilineal descent. Inheritance of other property and succession to male-held public offices are by patrilineal descent. Men of the lineage live together in a men's compound, while women, even after marriage, live with their mothers and children in a women's compound. Each Ga town has a number of different cults and many gods, and there are a number of annual town festivals.

=== Language ===
Linguistically, the Ga-Dangbe speak the Kwa languages Ga and Dangme. Dangme is closer to the original Ga–Dangme languages than the Ga language.

=== Names ===
Ethnic Ga surnames include Nikoi, Amon, Kotey, Ntreh, Kotei, Adei, Adjei, Kutorkor, Okantey, Oblitey, Lartey, Nortey, Aryee, Obodai, Oboshi, Torgbor, Torshii, Lante, Lomo, Lomotey, Tetteh, Ankrah, Tetteyfio, Laryea, Ayitey, Okai, Bortey, Quaye, Quaynor, Ashong, Kotei, Sowah, Odoi, Ablor, Adjetey, Dodoo, Darku and Quartey. Dangme names include Ningos Tettey, Tetteh, Teye, Narh, Narteh, Nartey, Narku, Nuerkie, Norkor, Nuertey, Kwei, Kweinor, Kwetey, Dugbatey, Martey, Addotey, Addo, Siaw, Saki, Amanor, Djangba, Kabu, Kabutey, Koranteng, Nortse, and Horminor. The Dawhenya royal family name is Darpoh.

=== Arts and culture ===
The Ga people celebrate the Homowo festival, which literally means "hooting at hunger". This festival originated several centuries ago. It is a food festival celebrated in remembrance of a great famine that afflicted the Ga people. It takes place in August every year and is celebrated by all the Ga clans.

The Dangbe people from Ada celebrate the Asafotu festival, which is also called 'Asafotufiam', an annual warrior's festival celebrated by Ada people from the last Thursday of July to the first weekend of August. It commemorates the victories of the warriors in battle and is a memorial for those who fell on the battlefield. To re-enact these historic events, the warriors dress in traditional battle dress and stage a mock battle. This is also a time for male rites of passage, when young men are introduced to warfare. Asafotu also coincides with the harvest cycle, when harvest-specific special customs and ceremonies are performed. These include purification ceremonies. The celebration reaches its climax with a durbar of chiefs, a colourful procession of the Chiefs in palanquins with their retinue. They are accompanied by traditional military groups called 'Asafo Companies' amidst drumming, singing and dancing through the streets and on the durbar grounds. At the durbar, greetings are exchanged between the chiefs, libations are poured and declarations of allegiance are made.

The Krobo people, a Dangbe people from Odumase Krobo, also celebrate the Ngmayem festival, an annual harvest festival to celebrate the bounty harvest of their farmers. Ngmayem is celebrated by the Krobo people throughout the last week of October with a visit to their ancestral home the Krobo Mountains. Figures associated with the Krobo traditional area such as the Konor (the Paramount Chief), sub-chiefs, government officials, other traditional authorities and invited guests gather between the last Friday and Saturday of October.

=== Music and sports ===
Ga-Dangbe music includes drumming and dancing. One of their traditional music and dance styles is kpanlogo, a modernized traditional dance and music form developed around 1960. Yacub Addy, Obo Addy, and Mustapha Tettey Addy are Ga drummers who have achieved international fame. Music of the Ga-Dangbe people also include Klama, Kpatsa, and the Dipo dance all of the Krobo people.

In addition to music, the Ga-Dangbe people are known for their long history and successes in the sport of boxing. The fishing community of Bukom on the outskirts of Accra, is considered a hub of boxing in Ghana and has produced several notable boxers. It is the home of many famous boxing "clubs" and gymnasiums. Notable fighters include former WBC champion, David Kotei aka DK Poison, Alfred Kotey, Joshua "The Hitter" Clottey, and former WBA Welterweight champion boxer Ike "Bazooka" Quartey, and former multi-weight class champion Azumah "Zoom Zoom" Nelson aka Prof.

=== Rites of passage ===
For the Shai and Krobo people, Dipo is the formal rite of passage. Originally designed as a formal marriage training for women in their twenties, Dipo has evolved into a pre-marital sexual purification rite that involves teenage girls conducting traditional religious rituals and putting on dance performances for the public. Initiates are partially nude throughout much of the ritual, and adorned with custom-made glass beads, colorful loincloths, and various forms of woven headgear. According to researcher and author Priscilla Akua Boakye, "[Dipo] was a form of vocational training for young women in which they were taught generally how to assume their roles as responsible women." Despite the ritual being designated for older teenaged girls, it is not uncommon for pre-adolescent and even toddler-aged girls to take part.

=== Funerals and "fantasy" coffins ===
The Ga people are known for their funeral celebrations and processions. The Ga believe that when someone dies, they move to another life. Therefore, since the 1950s, special coffins are often crafted by highly skilled carpenters for funerals. The pioneers of these artistic coffins were master craftsmen, such as Ataa Oko (1919–2012) from La, and Seth Kane Kwei (1925–1992) from Teshie.

The coffins designs can include anything desired by relatives of the deceased. Coffins are usually crafted to reflect an essence of the deceased in forms such as a character trait, an occupation, or a symbol of one's standing in the community. For example, a taxicab driver may be buried in a coffin shaped as a car. Many families spend extensively on coffins because they feel that they have to pay their last respects to the deceased and being buried in a coffin of cultural, symbolic as well as expensive taste is seen as fitting. Prices of coffins can vary depending on what is being ordered. It is not unusual for a single coffin to cost $600. This is expensive for local families considering that many Ga have an income of only $50 a month or less. This means that funerals are often paid for by wealthier members of the family, if such a member exists, with smaller contributions coming from other working members of the family.

Some foreigners are known to have been buried in Ga-styled coffins.

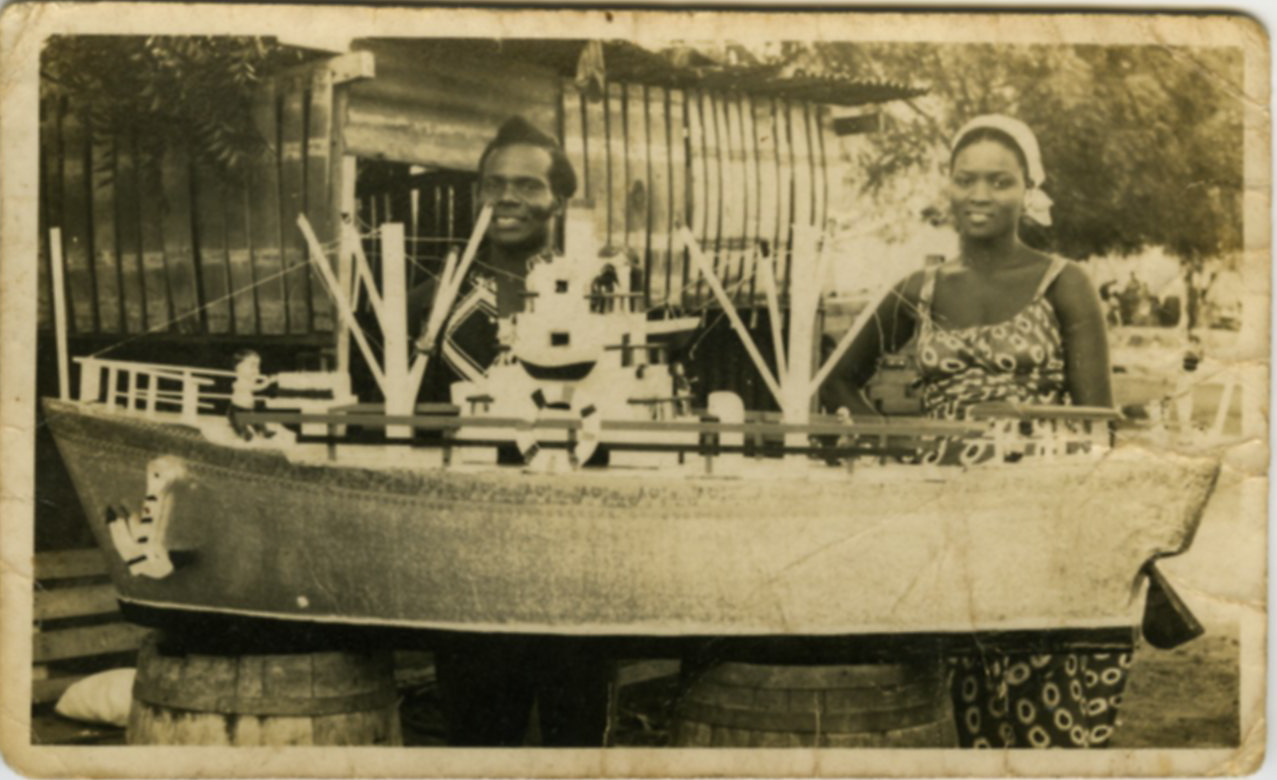
Ataa Oko and his third wife in front of his boat coffin, c. 1960. p. 137, "The buried treasures of the Ga", 2008

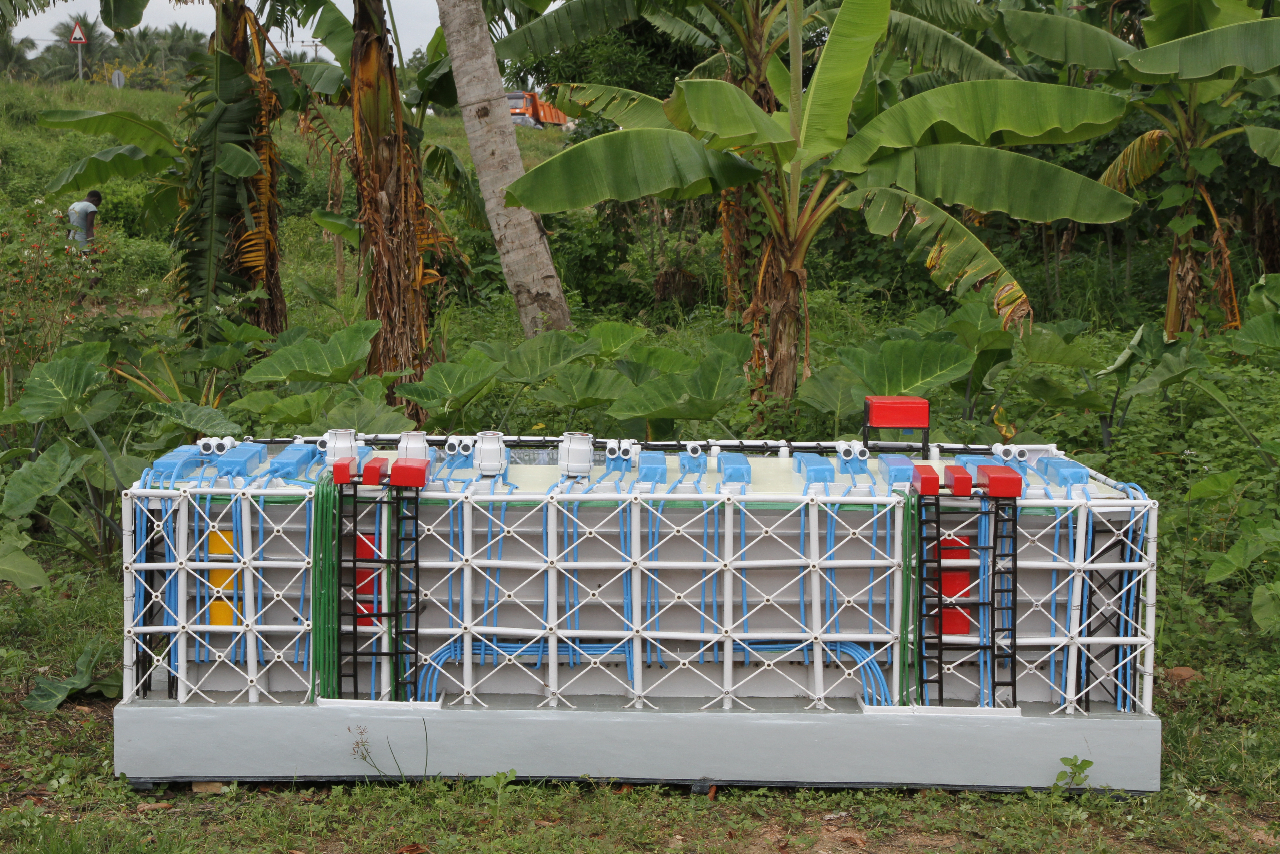
Pompidou coffin by Kudjoe Affutu, 2010. Photo by Regula Tschumi

The use of these fantasy coffins is rooted in Ga religious beliefs of the afterlife. They believe that death is not the end and that life continues in the next world in the same way it did on Earth. Deceased ancestors are also thought to be much more powerful than the living and able to influence their living descendants. This is why families do everything they can to ensure that a dead person is sympathetic towards them. In funerals, the size and the success of the burial service and the usage of an exclusive coffin reflects the social status of the deceased.

Ga coffins are only seen on the day of the burials when they are buried with the deceased. They often symbolise the dead people's professions, so that the deceased may be thought to continue with their earthly profession in the afterlife. Certain shapes, such as a sword or chair coffin, have royal or priestly symbolism with a magical and religious function. Only people with the appropriate status are allowed to be buried in these types of coffins. Various creatures, such as lions, cockerels, and crabs represent clan totems. Only the heads of the families concerned are permitted to be buried in clan-specific coffins. Many coffin shapes also evoke proverbs, which are interpreted in different ways by the Ga. Design coffins have been used since around the 1950s, especially in rural Ga groups with traditional beliefs, and have now become an integral part of Ga burial culture.

Today, figural coffins are made in several workshops in Togo and Greater Accra. Popular coffinmakers are, for example, Cedi and Eric Adjetey Anang of Kane Kwei Carpentry Workshop, Paa Joe, Daniel Mensah and Kudjoe Affutu. Most of the figural coffins are used for funerals, only a few are exported for international art exhibitions.

== Notable Ga-Adangbe people ==
- Ebenezer Ako-Adjei (17 June 1916 – 14 January 2002) was a lawyer and politician, who served as foreign minister and in other leading cabinet roles during the first Republic of Ghana as a member of the Convention People's Party. He was a founding member of the United Gold Coast Convention and is one of the "Big Six", who were arguably the most famous people in Ghana's fight for independence from British rule.
- Tetteh Quarshie (1842 – 25 December 1892) was a pre-independence agriculturalist and the person directly responsible for the introduction of cocoa crops to Ghana, which today constitute one of the major export crops of the Ghanaian economy.
- Carl Christian Reindorf (31 May 1834 – 1 July 1917) was a Euro-African-born pioneer historian, teacher, farmer, trader, physician and pastor who worked with the Basel Mission on the Gold Coast. He wrote The History of the Gold Coast and Asante in the Ga language, considered a pioneering work and a "historical classic". The work was later translated into English and published in 1895 in Switzerland. He used written sources and oral tradition, interviewing more than 200 people in the course of assembling his history.
- Nii Tackie Tawiah III (6 October 1940 – December 2012) was the monarch of the Ga State from 2006 to 2012.
- John William Hansen (23 February 1927 – 7 April 2012), popularly known as Jerry Hansen, was a highlife musician. He was a singer, composer, arranger, saxophonist, and pioneer of highlife music. He was the bandleader and founder of the Ramblers International Band. He was a founding member and the first president of the Musicians Union of Ghana (MUSIGA)
- Queen Asabia Cropper is regarded as a pioneering figure in Ghanaian highlife, recognised for her work as both a singer and soprano saxophonist. She helped shape Ghana's performance culture in the 1970s and 1980s through her stagecraft, musical arrangements, and collaborations with bands such as Sweet Talks and the Black Hustlers Band. Her distinctive kente-inspired headwrap styles became widely adopted in Ghana and Côte d’Ivoire, contributing to the contemporary visibility of Ghanaian textile and fashion traditions. She has received several honours, including cultural ambassador recognition and a lifetime achievement award, for her contribution to Ghana's music and cultural heritage.
- Lieutenant General Joseph Arthur Ankrah (18 August 1915 – 25 November 1992) served as the first commander of the Ghana Armed Forces, the Chief of the Defence Staff of Ghana and from 1966 and 1969 as the second President of Ghana. Ankrah also served as Chairperson of the Organisation of African Unity from 24 February to 5 November 1966.
- Mustapha Tettey Addy, traditional drummer & composer (b. 1942)
- Nii Quaynor, (born 1945) is a scientist and engineer who has played an important role in the introduction and development of the Internet throughout Africa. He holds degrees in engineering and computer science from Dartmouth College and the State University of New York at Stony Brook, where he completed his Ph.D. in 1977. Upon returning to Ghana in the 1990s, Quaynor established one of Africa's earliest Internet service providers and played a founding role in organizations like the African Network Operators Group (AfNOG) and AfriNIC, the continent's Internet numbers registry. He served as ICANN's first African director and has contributed to numerous global ICT initiatives, including as Chair of the OAU Internet Task Force and a Commissioner on the Global Commission on Internet Governance. Quaynor is recognized for his contributions with awards such as the Jonathan B. Postel Service Award and his 2013 induction into the Internet Hall of Fame.
- Ashitey Trebi-Ollennu is a Ghanaian robotics engineer at NASA, serving as the chief engineer and technical group leader for the mobility and manipulation group at the Jet Propulsion Laboratory. Trebi-Ollennu has played a significant role in various NASA Mars missions, including the Mars Rover and InSight projects. He holds multiple professional certifications and has a background in avionics and control systems.
- Victor B. Lawrence (born May 10, 1945, Ghana) is a renowned electrical engineer recognized for his groundbreaking work in signal processing and telecommunications. He played a pivotal role in advancing modem technology, data encoding, and high-speed Internet transmission, including the development of the 56kbit/s modem and improvements in DSL technologies. Lawrence's contributions to silicon chip design and digital video were essential to the global expansion of the Internet and digital broadcasting. He is currently a faculty member at Stevens Institute of Technology, holds several U.S. patents, and has been a leading advocate for bringing Internet access to underserved regions, notably through the installation of fiber optic cables along the west coast of Africa.
- Shirley Ayorkor Botchwey Honourable Shirley Ayorkor Botchwey (born 8 February 1963) is a Ghanaian diplomat, lawyer, and politician, currently serving as Secretary-General of the Commonwealth of Nations. Previously, she held the role of Ghana's Minister for Foreign Affairs and Regional Integration, appointed in 2017 by President Nana Akufo-Addo. As Foreign Minister, she played an instrumental role on the United Nations Security Council, securing UN funding for African Union-led peace operations, and chaired the ECOWAS Council of Ministers, advocating for regional stability and democratic transitions. Botchwey also promoted Ghana's "Year of Return" initiative, which strengthened ties with the African diaspora. A member of the New Patriotic Party, she holds degrees in law and business from the University of London and the University of Ghana and is widely recognized for her contributions to diplomacy and international cooperation.
- Raphael Nii Amaa Ollennu, JSC, FGA (21 May 1906 – 22 December 1986) was a jurist and judge who became a Justice of the Supreme Court of Ghana, the acting President of Ghana during the Second Republic from 7 August 1970 to 31 August 1970 and the Speaker of the Parliament of Ghana from 1969 to 1972.
- Obo Addy, traditional and contemporary drummer, composer and educator; NEA National Heritage Fellow 1996 U.S.A. (1936–2012)
- Yacub Addy, traditional drummer, composer, choreographer and educator: NEA National Heritage Fellow 2010 U.S.A.; collaborated with Wynton Marsalis (1931–2014)
- Christian Tsui Hesse, popularly known as Chris Hesse (born 29 August 1932) is a cinematographer, filmmaker, film administrator, photographer, and Presbyterian minister who is known for his cinematography in several films such as Love Brewed in the African Pot (1980) and Heritage Africa (1989). He was the personal photographer of Ghana's first President, Dr Kwame Nkrumah. Chris Hesse has helped document the visual history of the political leadership and development of the country. He also worked for the United Nations, serving as a photographer, documenting the Congo crisis in 1960.
- Atukwei John Okai (15 March 1941 – 13 July 2018) was a poet, cultural activist, and an academic. He was Secretary-General of the Pan African Writers' Association, and a President of the Ghana Association of Writers. His early work was published under the name John Okai. With his poems rooted in the oral tradition, he is generally acknowledged to have been the first performance poet to emerge from Africa, and his work has been called "politically radical and socially conscious, one of his great concerns being Pan-Africanism". His performances on radio and television worldwide include an acclaimed 1975 appearance at Poetry International at Queen Elizabeth Hall in London, where he shared the stage with US poets Stanley Kunitz and Robert Lowell, and Nicolás Guillén of Cuba.
- Justice Jacob Hackenburg Griffiths-Randolph (6 September 1914 – 25 July 1986) was a judge and also the Speaker of the Parliament of Ghana during the Third Republic. In 1959, during the First Republic of Ghana, President Kwame Nkrumah appointed him as Commissioner of Income Tax, the first African to hold that position. In 1966, he was appointed a Superior Court judge by the new government and served in Bolgatanga, Cape Coast, Tamale and finally Accra, where he was until he retired from the Bench in 1979. In September 1979, the 3rd Republic was born, and he was unanimously selected to be Speaker of Parliament. He served as Speaker of the Parliament of Ghana from 24 September 1979 – 31 December 1981
- Ernestina Naadu Mills (née Botchway) is an educator and a former First Lady of Ghana. She was the wife of President John Atta Mills (21 July 1944 – 24 July 2012) and is the recipient of a humanitarian award from the Health Legend Foundation.
- Rebecca Akufo-Addo (née Griffiths-Randolph) is a public figure and a First Lady of Ghana. She is the wife of President Nana Akufo-Addo.
- Ayi Kwei Armah, writer (b. 1939)
- Alice Annum aka the original "Baby Jet" (b. 1948) was also the first woman to represent Ghana at the Olympics. Throughout her career, not only did she compete as a runner, she also competed in long jump. Alice participated in the 1964 Olympics held in Tokyo, 1968 in Mexico and the 1972 Olympics held in Munich.
- Nii Ayikwei Parkes (born 1 April 1974), is a performance poet, writer, publisher, and sociocultural commentator. He is one of 39 writers aged under 40 from sub-Saharan Africa who in April 2014 were named as part of the Hay Festival's prestigious Africa39 project
- Emmanuel Tettey Mensah aka E. T. Mensah, musician (1919–1996) who was regarded as the "King of Highlife" music. He led the band "The Tempos", a group that toured widely in West Africa
- Warren Gamaliel Kpakpo Akwei, also known as Guy Warren or Kofi Ghanaba (4 May 1923 – 22 December 2008) was a musician, best known as the inventor of Afro-jazz — "the reuniting of African-American jazz with its African roots"[1] — and as a member of The Tempos, alongside E. T. Mensah. He also inspired musicians such as Fela Kuti. Warren's virtuosity on the African drums earned him the appellation "The Divine Drummer". At different stages of his life, he also worked as a journalist, DJ and broadcaster.
- John William Hansen, a singer, a composer, an arranger, a saxophonist, and a pioneer of highlife music. He was the founder of Ramblers International Band
- King Bruce, (3 June 1922 – 12 September 1997), a composer, band leader, musician, arranger, band leader, and multi-instrumentalist who made his mark on Ghana's dance band highlife tradition in a variety of ways.
- Shatta Wale – Born Charles Nii Armah Mensah Jr., a Ghanaian musician, songwriter, and producer. Known as a leading figure in the dancehall and afrobeat genres, he rose to fame with his hit single "Dancehall King" and gained international recognition through his collaboration with Beyoncé on "Already." A proud Gadangme, Shatta Wale is also an advocate for artist rights and welfare in Ghana.
- Saka Acquaye (2 November 1923 – 27 February 2007), a musician, playwright, sculptor and textile designer. He founded the African Ensemble while in the US and as its leader, recorded an album under the ELEKTRA label. He was a member of Ramblers International Band
- Grace Nortey is an actress who played multi-character lead roles on Ghanaian television in the 1990s.
- Mac Jordan Amartey (1936–2018) was a popular actor.
- Emmanuel Armah (born 22 April 1968) is a retired football defender. He played for Hearts of Oak in Ghana, except for the 1994–95 season at Sportul Studențesc București in Romania. He represented Ghana at the 1992 Africa Cup of Nations.
- Augustine Abbey, also known as Idikoko, is an actor and movie maker known for comedy. He is also known for his main roles as a house boy or gate man. He has produced and starred in a BBC documentary and also directed and produced a film on HIV and AIDS in partnership with UNESCO and Esi Sutherland-Addy's MMOFRA Foundation.
- Theresa Amerley Tagoe, Minister of Parliament (1943–2010)
- Azumah "The Professor" Nelson, boxer (b. 1958)
- Neville Alexander Odartey-Wellington, army commander
- Nii Amaa Ollennu, former Interim President of Ghana (1906–1986)
- Ike "Bazooka" Quartey, boxer (b. 1969)
- Ben Tackie, boxer (b. 1973)
- Justice Daniel Francis Annan, first Speaker of the Parliament of Ghana in the Fourth Republic. (b. 1928)
- George Commey Mills-Odoi, first Ghanaian Attorney General of Ghana; Justice of Supreme Court of Ghana (1962–1966)
- Justice E.N.P. Sowah, Chief Justice of Supreme Court of Ghana (1986–1990)
- Ebenezer Akuete, former diplomat
- Joshua Clottey, boxer, Former IBF Welterweight Champion.
- Richard Commey, boxer, International Boxing Federation (IBF) Lightweight World Champion
- Frank Gibbs Torto, chemist
- Daniel McKorley, the founder and chief executive officer of McDan Group of Companies
- Lesley Naa Norle Lokko is a Ghanaian-Scottish architect, academic, and novelist.
- Adjetey Anang, actor, popularly known as "Pusher", which was his screen name in the television series 'Things We Do for Love, and most recentry, Yolo'
- Nii Addo Quaynor, a rapper better known by his stage name Tinny.
- Boris Frederic Cecil Tay-Natey Ofuatey-Kodjoe (born 8 March 1973), better known as Boris Kodjoe, is an Austrian-born actor of German and Ghanaian descent known for his roles as Kelby in the 2002 film Brown Sugar, the sports-courier agent Damon Carter on the Showtime drama series Soul Food and was a recurring character on FOX's The Last Man on Earth. He currently co-stars on BET's Real Husbands of Hollywood and the Grey's Anatomy spin-off, Station 19.
- Abraham Nii Attah (born 2 July 2001). He made his feature film debut in Beasts of No Nation (2015). For his leading role of child soldier Agu, Attah was awarded the Marcello Mastroianni Award for Best Young Actor at the 72nd Venice International Film Festival. He was made an ambassador for the Free Education Policy in Ghana, after having supported the policy with a picture endorsement. In 2017, he appeared in the Marvel Studios film Spider-Man: Homecoming. He has joined the ensemble cast of Shane Carruth's third film, The Modern Ocean.
- Joselyn Dumas, television show host and actress
- Berla Addardey Mundi aka Berla Mundi, media personality, women's advocate and voice artist
- Naa Ashorkor Mensah-Doku, actress, radio/TV broadcaster and public relations professional
- Charles Nii Armah Mensah Jr. aka Shatta Wale, formerly known as Bandana, music producer and reggae-dancehall artiste
- Yvonne Nelson, actress, model, film producer and entrepreneur
- Chris Attoh (born Christopher Keith Nii Attoh; 17 May 1974) is an actor, on-air personality, television presenter and producer. He is best known as "Kwame Mensah" in Nigerian soap opera Tinsel.
- Odartei Mills Lamptey, popularly known as Gasmilla or International Fisherman, is a hiplife artist.
- Theophilus Tagoe (born 1 May 1982, disappeared 6 July 2014), popularly known as Castro or Castro Under Fire is a hiplife recording artist and musician.
- Nii Kwate Owoo, (born 1944) is an academic and filmmaker, described by Variety as "one of the first Ghanaians to make a 35mm film". His name has also appeared in film credits as Kwate Nee-Owoo.
- Eddie Nartey, (born 6 November 1984) is an actor, director, and film producer. His supporting role in Frank Rajah's "Somewhere In Africa" earned him a nomination at the Nollywood and African Film Critics Awards (NAFCA), and Ghana movie awards. He was nominated in the best actor category for Kiss Me If You Can.
- The Tagoe Sisters is the name of a musical duo consisting of twins Lydia Dedei Yawson Nee Tagoe and Elizabeth Korkoi Tagoe. They have been singing in the gospel music industry since 1983
- Nii Okai (Ernest Nii-Okai Okai, born 19 September 1977) is a contemporary gospel singer and choir leader.
- Danny Nettey (19 September 1968 – 15 July 2016) was a musician and songwriter. He was best described as one of the pioneers of Contemporary Gospel music in Ghana.

== See also ==
- Ga–Dangme languages
- Adangme language
- Ga language
- Ga Mantse
- Homowo
- Jamestown
- List of rulers of Gã (Nkran)
- Tabom people
- Teshie
- Category: Ga-Adangbes
