= Addy (surname) =

Addy is a surname.

Notable people with the surname include:

- Bob Addy (1842–1910), Canadian baseball player
- Bob Addy (cyclist) (born 1941), British cyclist
- Danny Addy (born 1991), English rugby league footballer
- David Addy (born 1990), Ghanaian footballer
- Gifty Addy (born 1984), Ghanaian sprinter
- Jangy Addy (born 1985), Liberian decathlete
- Lee Addy (born 1990), Ghanaian footballer
- Marian Ewurama Addy (1941–2014), Ghanaian scientist
- Mark Addy (born 1964), British actor
- Mark Diamond Addy, Ghanaian politician
- Mercy Addy (born 1964), Ghanaian sprinter
- Mustapha Tettey Addy (born 1942), Ghanaian drummer and ethnomusicologist
- Obo Addy (1936–2012), Ghanaian drummer and dancer
- Sidney Oldall Addy (1848–1933), English author of books on folklore and history
- Yacub Addy (1931–2014), Ghanaian drummer, composer, choreographer and educator
- Wesley Addy (1913–1996), American actor
