= Adye =

Adye is both a surname and a given name. Notable people with the name include:

== Surname ==
- John Adye (born 1939), British cryptographer
- John Miller Adye (1819–1900), British Army general and artist
- Stephen Galway Adye (1740−1838), English Royal Artillery Officer
- Stephen Payne Adye (c. 1740 – 1794), English Royal Artillery officer

== Given name ==
- Adye Douglas (1815–1906), Australian lawyer, politician and cricketer
