= Yacub Addy =

Ghanaian musician and educator (1931–2014)

- Birth name: Jacob Addy
- Born: 15 April 1931; Accra, Ghana
- Died: 18 December 2014 (aged 83); Albany, New York, U.S.
- Genres: Traditional Ghanaian, jazz
- Occupation(s): Musician, educator
- Instrument: Drum
- Years active: 1956–2014
- Formerly of: Ashiedu Ketrekre; Oboade; Odadaa!
- Website: yacubaddy.com

Yacub Addy (15 April 1931 – 18 December 2014) was a Ghanaian traditional drummer, composer, choreographer and educator who collaborated with many musicians in various genres, including Wynton Marsalis. He has been referred to as "the leading ambassador of Ghanaian music and culture".

Starting in 1995, Addy taught percussion and West African drumming at Skidmore College in Saratoga Springs, New York. He also taught at Rensselaer Polytechnic Institute in Troy, New York.

He was a recipient of a 2010 National Heritage Fellowship awarded by the National Endowment for the Arts, which is the United States government's highest honor in the folk and traditional arts.

== Early life ==
Addy was born in 1931 into the Ga ethnic group in the village of Avenor, outside of Accra, Ghana. His father was Jacob Kpani Addy ("Okonfo Akoto"), a wonche or medicine man who integrated rhythmic music into healing and other rituals. His mother was Akua Hagan, a lead singer in her husband's medicine music. His maternal grandmother was also an Okonfo ("Okonfo Ablabah"). His father had 10 wives over the course of his life, and more than 50 children. His extended family included many drummers, singers, and dancers, including brothers Obo Addy and Mustapha Tettey Addy.

As a teenager, Addy started to play the adowantsre drum, which is a supporting drum played with the hands, as part of his father's medicine music. His primary drumming teacher was his older brother Tetteh Koblah Addy ("Akwei Wejei").

At age 16, Addy became a Muslim, the first in his family. At that time he changed his forename from Jacob to Yacub, with his father's blessing.

== Career ==
=== As a performer ===
In 1956, the year before Ghana gained independence from British colonial rule, Addy organized and led the first major staged performance of traditional Ghanaian music and dance. He was the founder of the group Ashiedu Ketrekre, which had two units: an adult group of 40 members with drummers, singers, and dancers and a children's group. The adult ensemble was the first traditional group to play at Ghanaian hotels as well as for funerals of political and cultural figures. The children's group was the first traditional group to play on Ghanaian television. The children's group also performed during a visit by then-First Lady of the United States Pat Nixon.

He formed the small group Oboade in 1968, consisting of himself, some of his brothers and a friend. Oboade was the first professional traditional Ghanaian ensemble to tour in the West, from 1972 to 1975. Their first European concerts were at the 1972 Summer Olympics in Munich, where they were well received.

Oboade was based in London from 1972 to 1975, and it was there that Addy met his future wife and manager, Amina, an African-American woman. The group toured throughout Europe and the United States during that time. Their U.S. concerts included shows in Maryland and Chicago but many were held in the Pacific Northwest. After Oboade disbanded, the Addy family moved to Seattle in 1975, where he found work performing and teaching.

In 1982 while he was living in the Washington, D.C. area, Addy formed the ensemble Odadaa!, composed primarily of Ga artists and which remained active for decades. The group's name translates as "Let the music begin!" They performed both traditional Ghanaian music and dance, arranged and choreographed by Addy, as well as collaborations with artists from other traditions such as kora and jazz. Two of Addy's brothers performed with Odadaa! for many years.

Odadaa! made their first appearance at the New Orleans Jazz & Heritage Festival in 1984. Addy had wanted to visit the city ever since he heard Louis Armstrong talk about his hometown and its history during Armstrong's visits to Accra in the 1950s. Addy loved jazz and wanted to know more about the area called Congo Square and specifically the rhythms that Africans played there. On his 1984 trip to New Orleans, Addy made his first visit to Congo Square, located within present-day Louis Armstrong Park.

In 1993, Addy moved to the Capital Region of New York.

In 2005, Addy premiered his work "Kolo" with jazz vibraphonist Stefon Harris.

In 2010, Addy and Odadaa! were artists-in-residence at the Empire State Plaza Performing Arts Center ("The Egg") in Albany, New York.

==== Collaborations with Wynton Marsalis ====
Addy first saw Marsalis perform on television in 1981 playing with a symphony orchestra and was impressed with the younger musician's "spirit and his dedication". Addy told his wife at the time that someday he would work with Marsalis. The two musicians met in 1993 at the First inauguration of Bill Clinton, where they were to perform on the same stage and met in the dressing rooms. Addy told Marsalis that he liked him and said "with confidence" that someday they would work together. After that initial meeting, Marsalis attended performances of Odadaa! two years in a row at the World Music Institute in New York City. The two musicians did finally begin to work together in 2003, on a project titled Africa Jazz, representing a collection of Addy's compositions and Marsalis' jazz pieces. The project was performed in 2003 by the Jazz at Lincoln Center Orchestra and Odadaa! at Columbia University.

After the success of Africa Jazz, Addy and Marsalis began collaborating on Congo Square, a fusion of jazz and the musical traditions of the Ga people in Ghana. The piece was based on the history of enslaved Africans in New Orleans and the Square which from the 1700s through the mid-1800s was the only legal public gathering place where black people were allowed to dance and perform music, on Sunday afternoons. The mingling in Congo Square of those African rhythms with European brass traditions led to the birth of jazz. At the beginning of their collaboration, Addy asked Marsalis his years-old question about the music the slaves played in Congo Square. Marsalis replied that no one knew with certainty, but he was sure that together "they could capture that spirit", which became the basis of the work.

It was announced by Marsalis only four days before Hurricane Katrina hit the city that the premiere of the newly commissioned work would be outdoors in Congo Square on 23 April 2006, the final day of that year's French Quarter Festival, marking the culmination of a weeklong residency by the Jazz at Lincoln Center Orchestra. The plan was to repeat the performance on a seven-city tour of the U.S. South and East Coast, ending in New York City on 6 May. Following the devastation of New Orleans by flooding, Marsalis and Addy committed to going forward with the premiere as scheduled as a "gift to the spiritual revival of the Crescent City". The New York City performances were recorded and released on CD in 2007. Marsalis, Addy and their ensembles toured again with Congo Square in summer 2007, with performances across the U.S. and Canada. The musical suite was filmed at the 2007 Montreal International Jazz Festival and released on DVD.

On 19 January 2009, Addy's Odadaa! and Marsalis' Jazz at Lincoln Center Orchestra performed together at the Kennedy Center in Washington, D.C. as part of a celebration of the First inauguration of Barack Obama and the birthday of Dr. Martin Luther King Jr., titled as Let Freedom Swing. They performed the piece "Ajeseke" from Congo Square.

=== As an educator ===
Over the years as leader of various ensembles, Addy trained numerous Ghanaian musicians.

During the 1960s, when he was assisting his brother as a teacher at the Lincoln School, the American high school in Accra, Addy developed his Five Hand Drumming Techniques as a method to train non-Ghanaian students. He first put his system into use in the 1970s when he was teaching in the Pacific Northwest. His technique has been copied by many other instructors.

After moving to the United States, Addy offered numerous workshops in various cities. He also taught at several institutions, including the Washington State Cultural Enrichment Program, the Seattle Public Schools, Evergreen State College in Olympia, Washington, Howard University in Washington, D.C., Rensselaer Polytechnic Institute in Troy, New York, and at Skidmore College in Saratoga Springs, New York.

== Death ==
Addy died of a heart attack on 18 December 2014, at age 83. He was following behind an ambulance that was taking his wife to the hospital after she suffered an anaphylactic reaction. He experienced cardiopulmonary arrest while driving and died in the same emergency room at Albany Medical Center where his wife was being treated. Amina was released from the hospital on 20 December and Yacub was buried the following day in the Islamic tradition.

Addy was survived by his wife and nine children. At the time of his death, he had nine living siblings in Africa and two in Virginia. The Addys lived in Latham, New York.

== Discography ==
- 1974: Music of Ghana: Kpanlogo Party with Oboade
- 1982: Blema Bii: Children of the Ancients Yacub Addy with Obo Addy
- 1999: Children of the Ancients with Odadaa!
- 2007: Congo Square with Odadaa!, Wynton Marsalis, and Jazz at Lincoln Center Orchestra

== Filmography ==
- 1985: Dance Like a River: Odadaa! Drumming and Dancing in the U.S.
- 1997: Odadaa! Drumming and Dances of Ghana
- 2008: Congo Square: Wynton Marsalis and the Jazz at Lincoln Center Orchestra with Yacub Addy and Odadaa
- 2010: Let Freedom Swing: Conversations on Jazz and Democracy, includes three songs by Addy and Marsalis from Congo Square
- 2011: "Wynton at 50" from Live at Lincoln Center (PBS), a celebration of Marsalis' 50th birthday includes Addy and Odadaa! among the special guests

== Awards and honors ==
- 2000: Regional Arts Award, Albany-Schenectady League of Arts
- 2010: National Heritage Fellowship, National Endowment for the Arts
