= Jerry Hansen =

Jerry Hansen may refer to:

- Jerry Hansen (racing driver)
- Jerry Hansen (musician)
