= Black Beats =

Ghanaian band

Black Beats were a Ghanaian highlife band formed in 1952 by trumpeter King Bruce and tenor saxophonist Saka Acquaye. The group was known for combining traditional West African music with elements of swing and jazz.

== Formation ==
Black Beats were formed by King Bruce, a trumpeter and Saka Acquaye, a saxophonist. The group emerged during a period when Ghana (then the Gold Coast) was experiencing a surge in musical activity, with highlife becoming a central part of urban entertainment culture. Inspired by African-American swing music and performers such as Louis Jordan, the band adopted a musical style that emphasized both rhythm and vocal harmonies.

Black Beats were more focused on vocals in contrast to other Ghanaian bands at the time who played instrumental dance music and dominated the instrumental lineup, distinguishing their style from other highlife bands of the time like E.T. Mensah and the Tempos.

After some leading members of the band left in 1961, a second generation of Black Beats was formed headed by Sammy Oddoh this time.

== Career ==
From the 1950s through the 1960s, Black Beats recorded and performed extensively in Ghana and other West African countries. They were signed to several major labels, including His Master’s Voice (HMV), Decca, Philips, and Senafone.

Their early recordings included songs such as:

- "Teemon Sane"
- "Nkuse Mbaa Dong"
- "Agoogyl"
- "Srotoi Ye Mli"
- "Nomo Noko"

These songs were composed using traditional Ghanaian themes and languages, combined with Western musical structures. The group’s ability to merge different musical traditions allowed them to appeal to diverse audiences across Ghana’s urban centers.

In 1961, Jerry Hansen, a band member, left to establish the Ramblers International Band. He was joined by other musicians from The Black Beats. Despite this departure, King Bruce continued the group’s activities by recruiting new members and maintaining their performance schedule.

During this period, The Black Beats released additional recordings including hits like:

- "Medo Wo Se Nea Woti Ara"
- "Kwemo Ni Okagbi"
- "Odo Fofor"
- "Nkase Din"

== Members ==
Notable members of Black Beats over the years included:

- King Bruce – Trumpet, bandleader
- Saka Acquaye – Saxophone, co-founder
- Jerry Hansen – Saxophone (later founder of Ramblers International Band)
- Ebo Taylor – Guitarist and composer (briefly associated)
- Guy Warren (Kofi Ghanaba) – Drummer and percussionist (collaborator in early days)
- Sammy Oddoh
- Dan Acquaye – Vocals
- George Lee – Trombone
- Kwame Mensah – Trumpet
- C.Q. Mintah – Vocals
- George Ofori – Vocals
- Dan Quarcoo
- Alfred Tetteh
- Willie Cofie – Vocals
- Alfred Tetteh
- Aryee Phorson
- Ashifie Rankilor
- Bengo Kwantreng
- Charlie Baiden
- Eddie Owoo
- George Annor
- George Tackie
- Isaac Addignton
- Stanley Lokko
- Thomas Tamakloe
- Yoland Quarcoo
- Kwatei Hammond
- Lamptey Cruikshank
- Louis B. Wadewor
- Mark Antonio Kobla Kotey
- Mike Lewis
- Nobby Amarfio
- Patrick Forson
- Quamina Croffie
- Ray Tetteh
- Rowland Sackey
- Rusty Quarshie

The lineup changed several times during the 1950s and 1960s, especially after the formation of new bands by former members.
