= Gasmilla =

Ghanaian hiplife artist

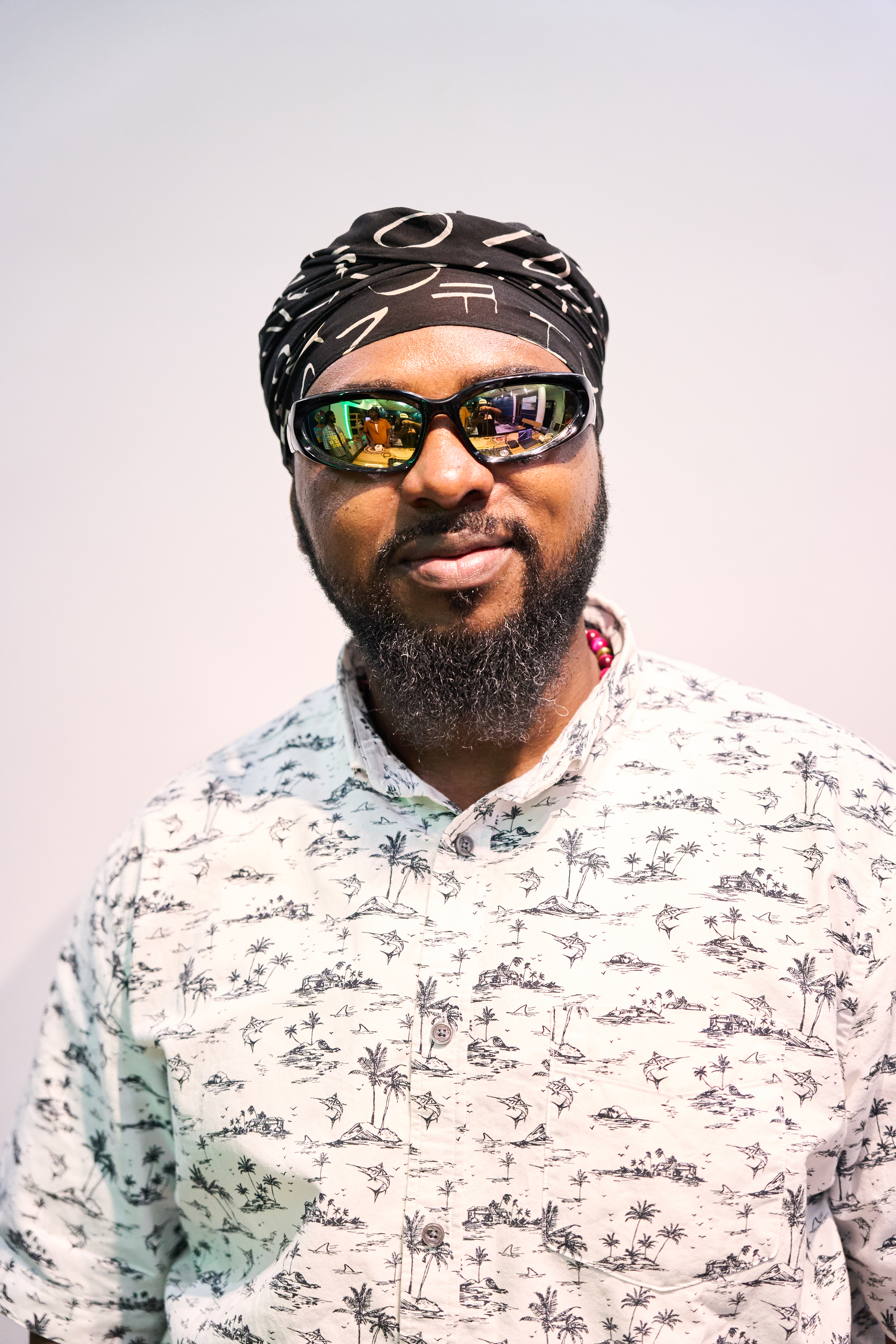
- Gasmilla at his album listening in Accra 2026.

Background information
- Born: Odartei Milla Lamptey; December 15, 1984 (age 41)
- Origin: Ghana
- Genre: Hiplife
- Occupation: Musician

Odartei Milla Lamptey (born December 15, 1984) popularly known as Gasmilla or International Fisherman, is a Ghanaian Hiplife artist. He is noted for the songs Aboodatoi and Telemo ft. Capasta and part of the early adopters of the Azonto Dance and music Genre. He is an Afro-pop singer and a songwriter.

== Music career ==
Gasmilla started his music career featuring artists while in Junior High school. While in senior high school, he became the first artist at Cold Eye studios. Gasmilla's first major single was "Aboodatoi".

In October 2023, Gasmilla together with Amandzeba, Sly Collins, Nii Funny, Qushan, Short Man, Rebai, Maame Esi, Nii Bi, Ibrahim Badingu, Addotey Titor, Klala, XInc and Aklerh paid tribute to the Ga Manye (Queenmother of the Gas), Naa Dedei Omaedru III during her funeral.

== Discovery ==
When Gasmilla was at the age of 7, he became seriously involved in singing influenced by his Father and he has been performing since the age of 12. He started producing his music slowly but always progressed. At the age of 13, he decided he wanted to get serious in the music industry. His mother had gotten a boom-box with a microphone that he used in recording his rap and ragga tunes, with the help of his younger sister singing choruses, it was at the moment that he discovered his hidden talent. In high school, he was one of the prominent names in media and entertainment in Wesley Grammar School. Gasmilla even emerged as the best performing artist in inter-school fiesta back in 2003. He was also one of the best rappers the University of Professional Studies. He has also worked with top producers such as Decoder, Odo Nsuo, Akwaboah, and more.

== Education ==
Gasmilla is an alumnus of Wesley Grammar and the University of Professional Studies.

== Partnership ==
In May 2021, Gasmilla partnered with AMA to promote sanitation in the city of Accra. This partnership was claimed to use his brand to educate the public and create awareness on the need to keep the city clean. Gasmilla claimed the Assembly decided to partner with him because of his previous involvement on sanitation projects.

=== Environmental activities ===
In April 2024, Gasmilla organized a beach cleanup exercise dubbed “Falefale” with school children from Jamestown.

== Discography ==
=== Singles ===
1. Telemo (2015)
2. Edey Jom Papa (2016)
3. 2 Sure feat. Kofi Metta (2017)
4. Joo (2017)
5. Bentua (2017)
6. Sometimes I feel lost (2025)

=== Albums & EP ===
1. Fisherman Waves (2019)
2. Underworld EP (2019)
3. Sea Son 10.10.10 (2019)
4. Fifteenth (2021)

== Videography ==
| Year | Title | Director | Ref |
|---|---|---|---|
| 2016 | Dumsor Baa As featured artiste | Teddy (5teven Films) | |
| 2016 | Red Lite As featured artiste | Snares Beats Projects and 5teven Films | |
| 2015 | Fale Fale Featuring All Stars | Lex MacCarthy | |

== Awards ==
| Year | Organization | Award | Nominated work | Result |
|---|---|---|---|---|
| 2020 | VGMA | Vodafone Green Ambassador | | Won |
