= Tettey =

Tettey may refer to:

- Alexander Tettey (born 1986), Norwegian footballer
- Tettey (given name), a Ghanaian masculine given name

== See also ==
- Tettey-Enyo
