= Capasta =

Ghanaian musician and a FIFA license football coach

Capasta Ambandi
- Born: Imurana Abdul Karim
- Origin: Ghana
- Genres: Hiplife, Afrobeats & Rap
- Occupation: Musician/ Football coach
- Years active: 2013–present
- Label: Ambandi Music

Imurana Abdul Karim (also known as Capasta or Capasta Ambandi) is a Ghanaian musician, songwriter, rapper, performer, FIFA-licensed football coach And a Founder of World Dynamic Community Organization (WDC). He is noted for Gasmilla Telemo song ft Capasta Ambandi in 2014, Control in 2015, Badabaya ft Gasmilla in 2016, Bulaala ft Epixode and Article One in 2017, Gucci Ferrari, On Me, Father, Wrong Number, and Kuzo Muyi Wasa (VIP cover), he was named in the list of artists picked by MTV Base (DStv channel 322). As a football coach, he has won nine titles with Under 13 teams. He won 2 trophies in Denmark, 3 trophies in Sweden, 3 trophies in Norway, and 1 trophy in France.

== Career ==
=== Music career ===
Capasta began his career in music during his senior high school days. He made his entry into the music scene in 2014 when he was featured on Gasmilla's song Telemo in In December 2015, he performed on stage at the Miss Galaxy Ghana beauty pageant at the Zenith University College auditorium.

On February 17, 2023, Capasta released his first 10-song studio album titled “Its Time” which features Ghanaian musicians like Edem, Spicer Dabz, Rashid Metal, Gasmila and Bayinnah an all-digital streaming platform across the world.

=== Coaching career ===
Capasta is also the head coach and soccer administrator at the Lizzy Sports Complex. He has a FIFA coaching license and took his Under-12 team to win the World Youth Cup in Norway in 2017. In 2018, he also led his team to win the Paris World Games in Paris, France. On 1 February 2023 he signed a coaching contract with IK Junkeren Bodo sports club and he was appointed the head coach.

== Nomination ==
In August 2016, Capasta was nominated in the first edition of the Hausa Music Festival and Awards which was covered by BBC Hausa Service alongside Shatta Wale, Stonebwoy, Samini and others.

== Discography ==
- Telemo ft Gasmilla (2014)
- Badabaya (2015)
- Control (2015)
- Blessings (2019)
- Gucci Ferrari (2019)
- On Me (2020)
