= Asafotu =

Festival in Ghana by the Adangbes

Asafotu Festival is celebrated by the Ga-Adangbe people of Ghana and Togo. The Ada/Dangbe East people celebrate Asafotu which is also called 'Asafotufiam', an annual warrior's festival celebrated by Ga-Dangbe people from the last Thursday of July to the first weekend of August. It commemorates the victories of the warriors in battle, fought by their ancestor which were all won, those who fell on the battlefield. To re-enact these historic events, the warrior dresses in traditional battle dress and stage a mock battle. This is also a time when the young men are introduced to warfare to become warriors.

The festival also ushers in the harvest cycle for this special customs and ceremonies are performed. These include purification ceremonies. The celebration reaches its climax in a durbar of chiefs, a colourful procession of the Chiefs in palanquins with their retinue. They are accompanied by traditional military groups called 'Asafo Companies' amidst drumming, singing and dancing through the streets and on the durbar grounds. At the durbar, greetings are exchanged between the chiefs, libations are poured and declarations of allegiance made.
