= Tettey (given name) =

Tettey is a Ghanaian masculine given name. Notable people with the name include:

- Emmanuel Tettey Mensah (1919–1996), Ghanaian musician
- Mustapha Tettey Addy (born 1942), Ghanaian drummer and ethnomusicologist
