= King Ayi Kushi =

King of the Ga dangme people

Ayi Kush was a king of the Ga dangme. He is the first known Gã Mantse of recorded History.

The Great Nicolai Ashaley, the leader of the great migration was both a spiritual and political leader of the Gã people, and he led the Gãs to their homelands, and unified the various Gã state through the giving of "His Seven Commandment".

== See also ==
- Ga Dangme people
- Gã Mantse
