= Naa Dedei Omaedru III =

Ga Queen Mother (Ga Manye)

Naa Dedei Omaedru III (20 April 1934-26 December 2022) also known as Naa Dedei Ablah was the Queen mother of the Ga State.

== Early life and education ==
Her parents were George Holmes and Sarah Akweley Kotey, she lived in Nigeria with her Uncle Charles Holmes at a Tender age where she attended school. She moved back to Ghana because her mum was sick and she continue her education at Adabraka Methodist School where she completed her standard seventh education.

== Career ==
She worked at the Pioneer Paper Bag Factory at Jamestown.In 1960 and 1961 she won the Greater Accra Beauty Pageant and later participated at the Miss Ghana Beauty Pageant of which she was second. She moved to Tema Aluminium Factory as sectional head.

== Reign ==
In 1963 she was enstooled as the Queen Mother of the Ga State (Ga Manye) at age 29. She took the stool name Naa Dedei Omaedru III, a name she took from her grand-mother Naa Dedei Omaedru II.
