= Addie Pearl Nicholson =

American artist and quilter (1931–2022)

Addie Pearl Nicholson (January 17, 1931 – January 13, 2022) was an American artist who was associated with the Gee's Bend quilting collective. She was the secretary of the Freedom Quilting Bee when it was incorporated in 1966, and then served as the cook for the Freedom Quilting Bee's daycare center, and as the president of the Bee.

== Early life ==
Addie Pearl Nicholson was born in Dallas County, in an area called Pleasant Hill, near Selma, Alabama. Although, by and large, New Deal programs, particularly those concerning agriculture, such as the Agricultural Adjustment Act, Resettlement Administration, and the Farm Security Administration, benefited white Americans more than black Americans, many families in Gee's Bend and the surrounding areas saw economic improvement during the New Deal era. For instance, Nicholson's family moved to Coy, Alabama when the McDuffie Plantation was broken up by the federal government for unfair sharecropping practices. Her father received 150 acres of arable land from this land seizure. Most black families were skeptical of the government program and moved north to avoid further systemic injustice.

Nicholson and her husband, Daniel Nicholson, met when she was 18 years old. They married soon after and moved to Gee's Bend to farm and raise a family. Gee's Bend does not have many new families, and they refer to the Nicholson family as "incomers", though they lived there most of their lives.

== Work ==
Nicholson first began to make quilts when she was 16 and began making more after she married. Her husband, Daniel, proudly recalls helping her quilt, joking that, "She couldn't beat me sewing." Their quilts, like most, were utilitarian, mostly used to keep their children warm at night and comfortable when sitting in the fields.

== Death ==
Addie Pearl Nicholson died in Camden, Alabama, on January 13, 2022, four days before her 91st birthday.
