= Dipo =

Puberty rite in Ghana

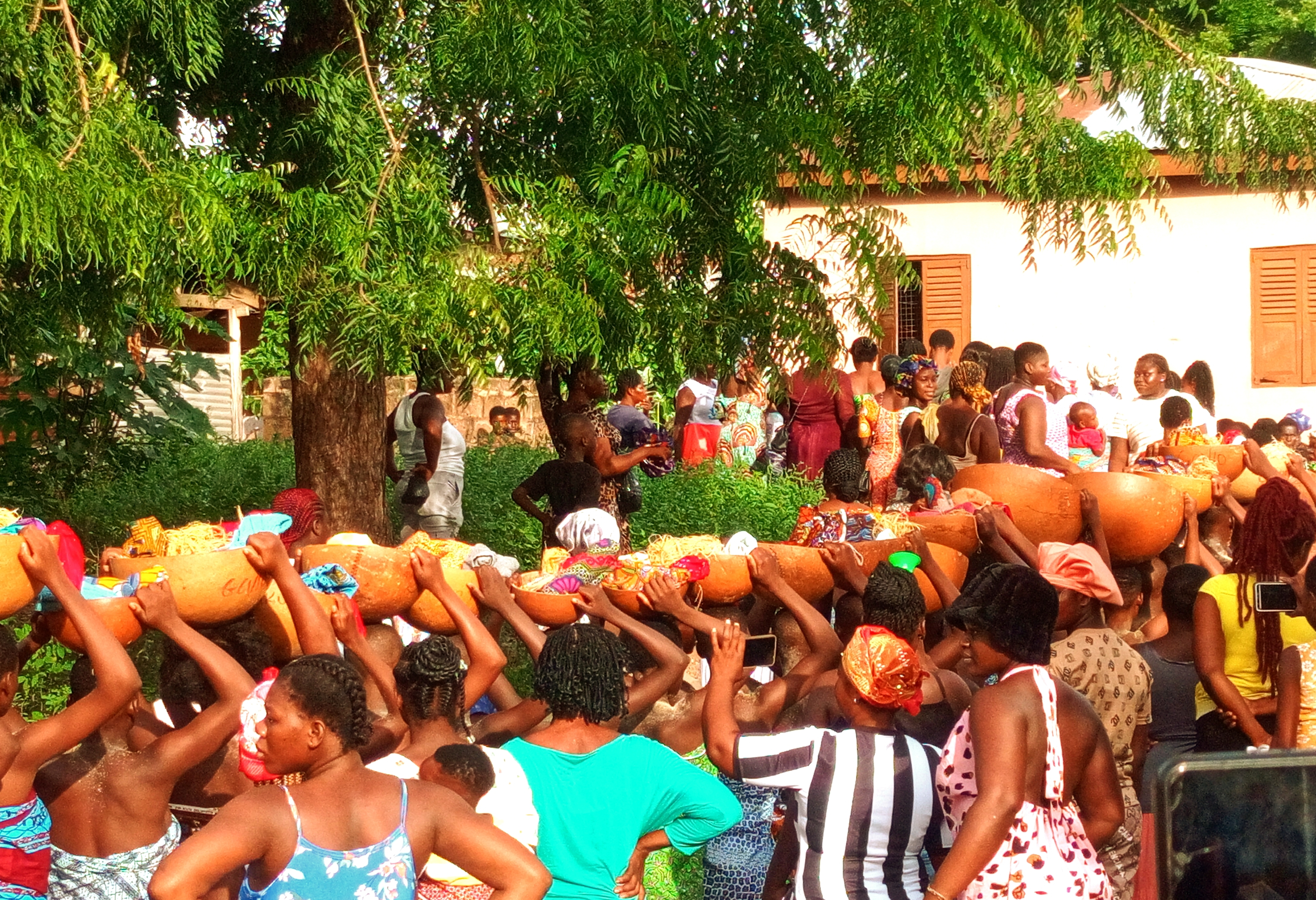

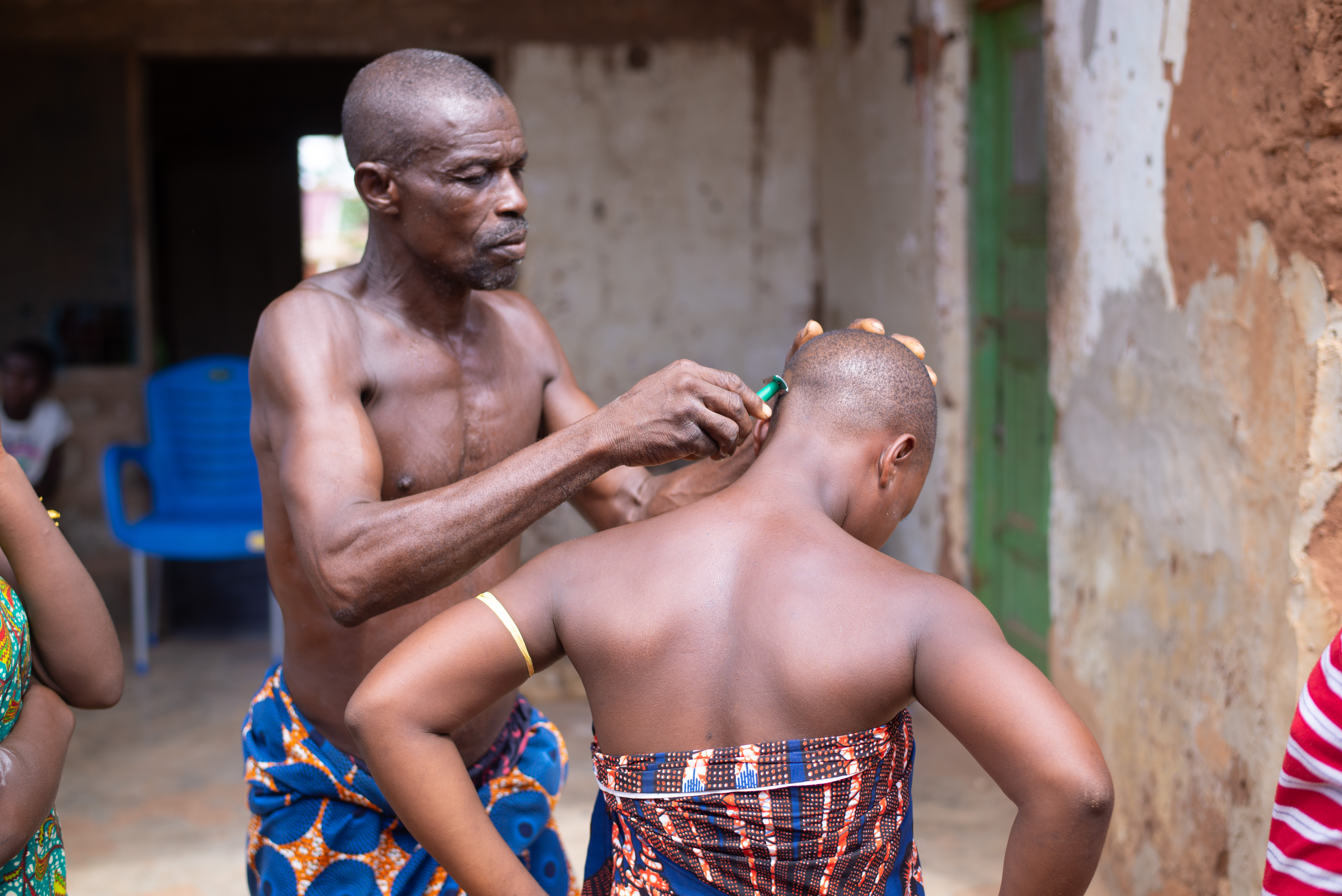
Chief priest shaving the Dipo girls

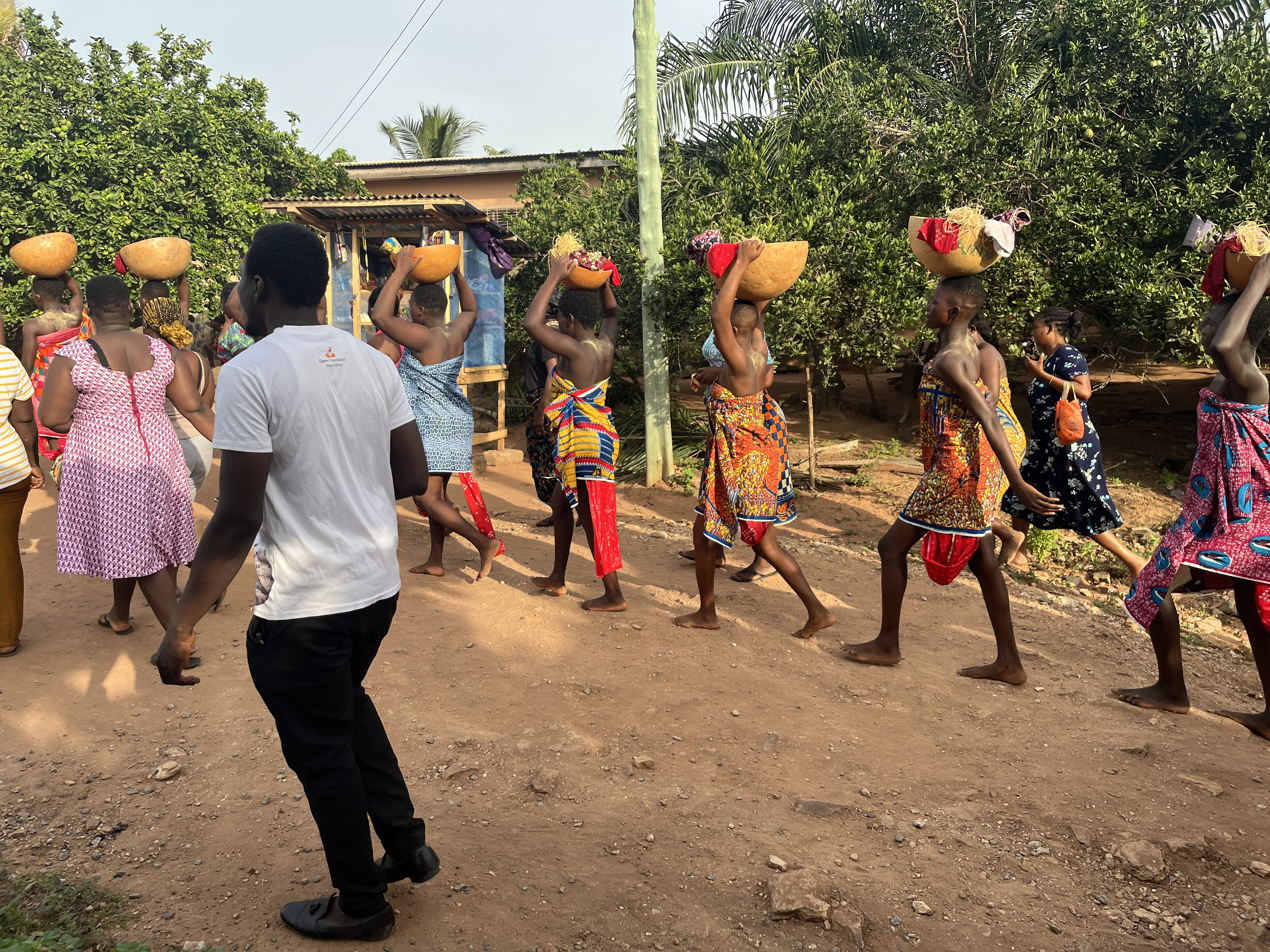
Girls are marched around the town celebrating their passage of the rites.

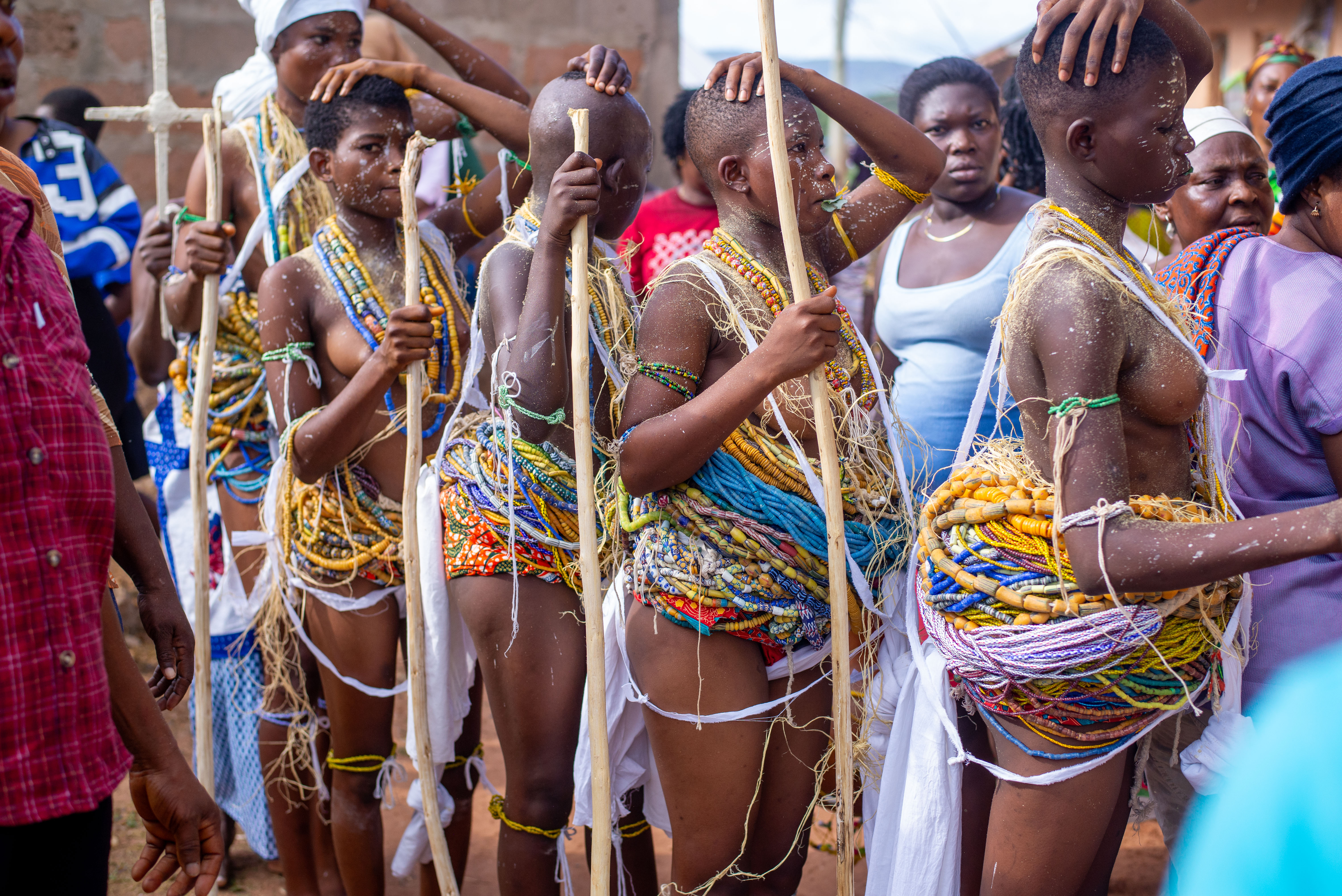

The Dipo ceremony is one of the most popular puberty rites practices in Ghana. It is one of the most attended events in the country, attracting huge numbers of tourists. The rite is performed by the people of Odumase Krobo and Shai areas in the Eastern Region of Ghana. A priestess known as Klowεki instituted the Dipo puberty rite. The rite is performed in April every year for girls between the ages of fifteen and twenty-five. It is used to usher virgin girls into puberty or womanhood. It is performed for girls to show that they are ready for marriage and to cleanse them spiritually. The Dipo rite serves as a symbol of cultural heritage and a means to preserve the traditions and values of the Krobo people.

== Ritual process ==
The Dipo chief priest, the Nako, sends messengers to all the communities to inform them of the opening of the Dipo season. Parents, upon hearing the announcement of the rite, send their eligible daughters to the chief priest. The girls, however, have to go through rituals and tests to prove their chastity before they qualify to take part in the festival.

On the first day of the rites, the girls' heads are shaved, and they are dressed in cloth around their waist to the knee level. This is done by a special ritual mother, and it signifies their transition from childhood to adulthood. They are paraded through the community as initiates (dipo-yo).

Early the next morning, the chief priest Nako gives the initiates a ritual bath. He pours libation to ask for blessings for the girls. He then washes their feet with the blood of a goat presented by the parents of the initiates, to drive away any spirit of barrenness. The crucial part of the rite is when the girls sit on the sacred stone in order to prove their virginity. Virginity is the sole requirement to enable a girl perform the Dipo rite. Any girl found to be pregnant or not a virgin is detested by the community and does not entice a man from the tribe. She is considered a disgrace to her family and is ostracized.

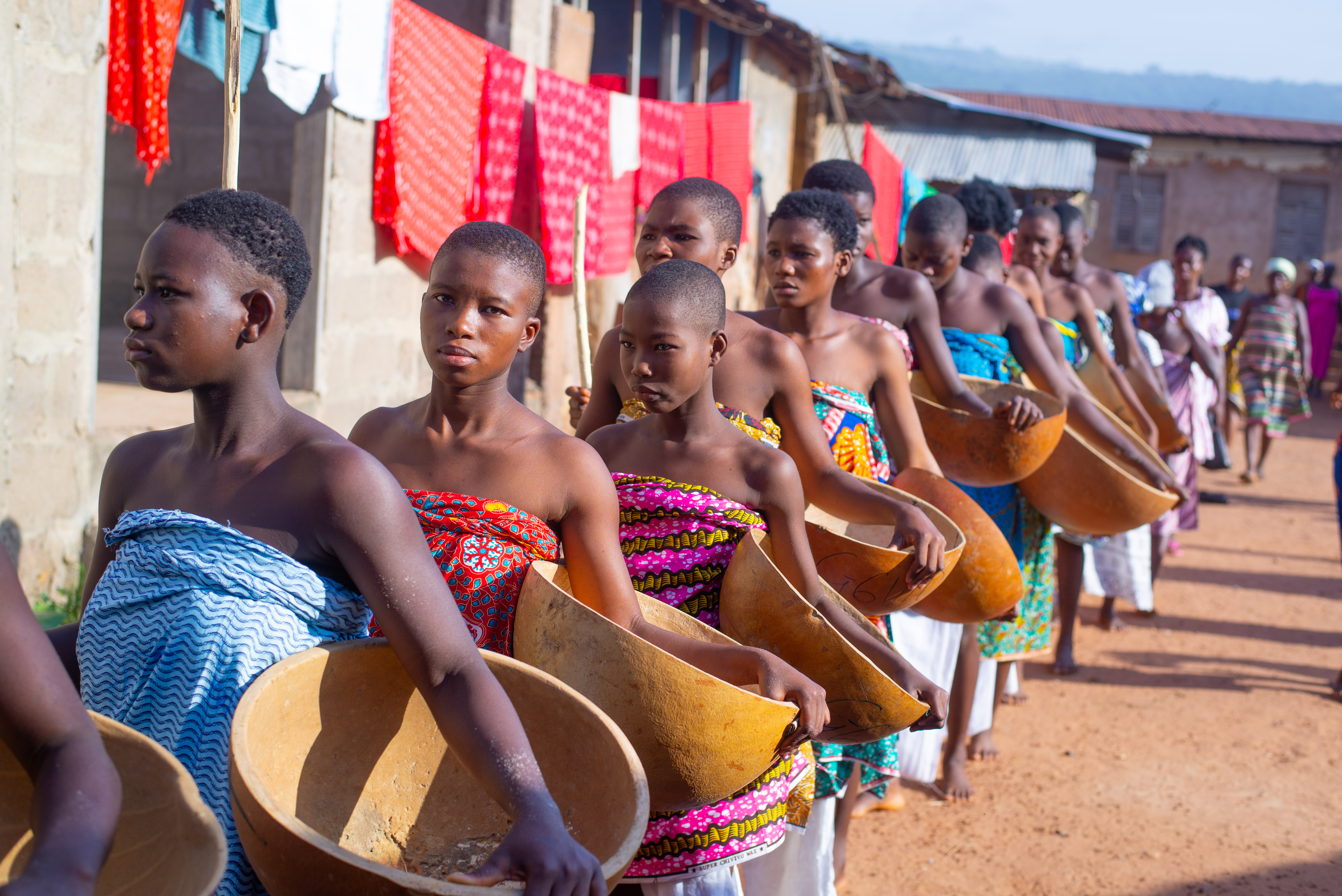
Dipo girls on procession

The girls are then housed for a week, where they are given training by the elderly women on cooking, housekeeping, sex education, childbirth and nurturing. The ritual mothers give them special lessons on seduction and how their husbands will expect to be treated. They learn the Klama dance, which is performed on the final day of the rites.

After the one-week schooling, they are released and the entire community gather to celebrate their transition into womanhood. They are dressed in rich kente cloth accessorised with beads around their waists, necks and arms. The beads signify their transition and readiness for marriage. With singing and drumming, they perform the Klama dance. At this point, any man interested in any of them can start investigating her family. The family investigation is done to ensure the girl comes from a good home with no history of issues like infertility or mental illness. It is assumed that any woman who partakes in the rites not only brings honour to herself but to her family at large. The ritual is done to initiate young women into knowing their responsibilities before stepping into marriage.

== Construction of femininity and social expectations ==
Dipo shapes the conception of femininity among the Krobo people. It is not just considered a ceremonial rite of passage but a structured process of gender socialization through which the girls are introduced to culturally defined expectations of womanhood. The rite serves as a mechanism for transmitting social norms across generations.

Gender socialization in Ghana mostly occurs through formal and informal cultural practices. These practices shape attitudes towards sexuality, behaviour and social roles. Elderly women formalize this process by teaching the girls proper behaviour, respectability and their duties within the family and the community at large. They also emphasize ideals of morality and sexual propriety. Girls who participate in this rite are made to understand that they have reached maturity and are prepared to adhere to socially sanctioned norms of behaviour.

The ritual places femininity within a framework of responsibility and collective expectation. This highlights the significance of women's duties in upholding social order and continuity. These gender expectations are reinforced by the material and symbology of the rituals. The use of beads, body ornaments and specific forms of dressing communicate social meanings associated with status and transformation and not just aesthetics. These symbolic elements convey identity and signify a shift into new social roles including womanhood.

== Contemporary debate ==
The Dipo rite has been the centre of scholarly and public discourse. These debates center on issues of women's rights, cultural preservation, religious resistance and the pressures of modernization. Two major school of thoughts exist regarding the future of the rite; either abolish the rites entirely, or modify some aspects of the rite.

Religious opposition has been biggest source of controversy surrounding Dipo. When the Basel Missionaries arrived in the 19th century, they saw Dipo as a major barrier to conversion to Christianity, labelling it "immoral" and "devilish". The missionaries attempted to abolish the rite, but they failed. A number of Krobo women who converted to Christianity returned to performing the rite by the 1880s, trying to balance their religious and cultural beliefs.

In contemporary times, Krobo society is divided when it comes to performing the Dipo rite. One group believes that Dipo is ungodly and that true Christians must not participate in it. The other group believes that Dipo is a culturally binding rite of passage and that it is essential for all Krobo girls to perform regardless of religious background.

Another angle of debate is gender and bodily rights. Some critics say the Dipo rites reinforce gender stereotypes and are no longer necessary in modern times. Some have questioned the continued performance of the Dipo rite due to Christian, secular and social ideas about women's rights and bodily privacy. The public display of the initiates' bodies, which is to signal that they were ready for marriage, has also drawn criticism. In response, some communities allow the girls to cover their breast with a cloth. This modification was to address the social concern with the exposure of private body parts.

The rite is also criticized for the heavy focus on preparing the initiates for marriage and domestic skills. The majority of the rituals and education center focus on teaching the young girls to manage home and keep a man. Critics argue that this reinforces traditional gender roles; women's identities as wives, mothers and homemakers are prioritized over aspirations such as education, careers or personal development. The rite is portrayed as limiting the broader opportunities available to girls.
