= Addie Garwood Estes =

American temperance activist

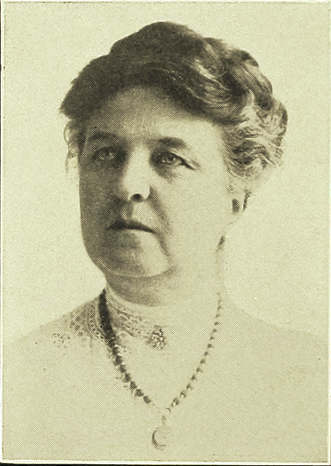
Addie Garwood Estes (1911)

Addie Garwood Estes (1868 – November 2, 1928) was an American temperance activist. Since early adulthood, she worked for the temperance movement and affiliated with the Woman's Christian Temperance Union (W.C.T.U.), serving as president of the Northern California chapter from 1921 until her death in 1928.

== Early life and education ==
Her parents were James Marshall and Mary Josephine (Thomas) Garwood. James Marshall Garwood, a native of Tennessee, was captain of a wagon train that crossed the Great Plains to California in 1858. He soon went back east and in 1860, led another wagon train to California. In the same year came Mary Josephine Thomas. They were married at Stockton, California, in 1862. James Marshall Garwood was a pioneer rancher near Collegeville, San Joaquin County. He retired some years before his death in 1900, while his wife died in 1898. Mr. Garwood was one of the supporters of the old Presbyterian College at Collegeville, California.

Addie Garwood was born at Collegeville in 1868, was reared and educated there.

== Career ==
In 1884, she married William M. Estes, a rancher. Mr. Estes was a prominent member of the Independent Order of Odd Fellows and the Woodmen of the World. He died in 1921. Their son, Roy Lincoln Estes, while still in the service of the United States army, died in 1918 at the Letterman Army Hospital in San Francisco of influenza at the age of 31. The daughter, Ethel, married W. C. Stephenson, who was associated with the Southern Pacific Railway.

In 1890, she became a working member of the W.C.T.U. During her residence at Stockton, she was known locally as a civic worker and represented the W.C.T.U. in the Chamber of Commerce.

In California, the W.C.T.U. handled its departmental work through a superintendent or director, thus centralizing responsibility. The plan resulted in the creation of specialists. Estes first attracted attention by the work she did as president of the W.C.T.U. in San Joaquin County. Then for seven years, she was superintendent of institute work in California. Each year, she evolved an institute program as well as a "plan of work" for the department. In making this plan effective, she traveled all over the state as institute leader, "training for service" the women of the W.C.T.U. It has been said that what Plattsburgh, Camp Lewis and other training camps were to the American Expeditionary Forces, the institute is to the White Ribboner. Much of the moral fiber and the esprit-de-corps of the W.C.T.U. of California was due to the painstaking work of those years.

The state organization recognizing Estes' exceptional qualifications elected her recording secretary, and from that position she became vice-president-at-large.

During these years, she was also the legislative superintendent, representing the organization in the "third house" at the State Legislature during several sessions. In the statewide prohibition campaign of 1916, she was chosen as superintendent of Woman's Work for Northern California. She served as one of the vice presidents of the California Women's Joint Legislative Committee, a federation of organizations for special legislative work. For two years before becoming president Estes was a member of the Board of Lecturers of the National W.C.T.U.

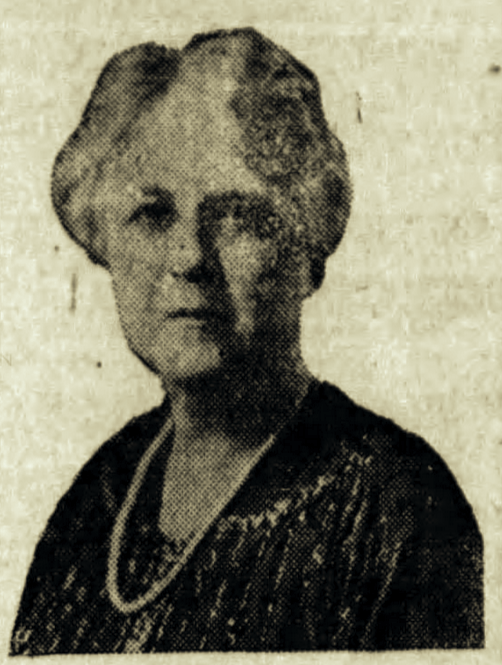
(1922)

After her husband's death in 1921, Estes became a resident of Berkeley, California. Her magnetic personality, her ability to organize, and her carry-out plans and campaigns were characteristic of all the 35 years of her work in the organization, so that in the same year, she was elected president of the California W.C.T.U.

Estes was likewise a pioneer woman in party politics in California. In politics as in temperance work, she was guided by ideals mixed with an intuitive understanding of conditions which gave her work such practical success. At all times, she urged women to take their citizenship seriously and make the gift of the ballot effective for better things. It was in direct response to a general recognition among women of her undoubted qualifications as a political leader and advisor that she was chosen delegate-at-large to the National Republican Convention in Cleveland in June 1924. In the words of one who was familiar with her part in the campaign of that year, she "stood as the personification of the American woman, not swayed by politics or party but by the pure patriotism that stands for loyalty to the constitution and observance of law."

== Personal life ==
In addition to being a member of: theWestern Women's Club, League of Women Voters, and the National Council for the Prevention of War, Estes served as vice-president, California Federation of Women's Republican Clubs.

Addie Garwood Estes died at St. Luke's Hospital in San Francisco, November 2, 1928.
