= Stephen Payne Adye =

English brevet-major of the Royal Artillery

- Born: 1740s
- Died: 1794
- Military career
- Allegiance: United Kingdom
- Commands: Royal Artillery

Stephen Payne Adye (c. 1740 – 1794) was an English brevet-major of the Royal Artillery.

== Life ==
He entered the Royal Military Academy, Woolwich, as a cadet, in 1757, and was appointed as second-lieutenant in the royal artillery in 1762. He served some time as brigade-major of artillery in North America, where he prepared his well-known book on courts-martial, entitled Treatise on Courts-Martial, to which is added an Essay on Military Punishments and Rewards. [Printed at New York, and reprinted in London, 1769.] The book went through several subsequent editions, the second appearing in London in 1778, and was modified by later editors. He was a member of the American Philosophical Society, elected in 1772. Major Adye died in command of a company of invalid artillery, in Jersey, in 1794.

== Family ==
Of three sons in the regiment, the eldest, Captain Ralph Willett Adye, who died in 1808, was author of the Pocket Gunner, a standard work of reference, which first appeared in 1798, and passed through many editions; the second, Major-General Stephen Galway Adye, served in the Iberian Peninsula and at the Battle of Waterloo, and died Chief Firemaster of the Royal Laboratory in 1838; the third, Major James Pattison Adye, died in 1831.
