= Addie E. Citchens =

American writer

Addie E Citchens is an American writer.

Citchens was born in Clarksdale, Mississippi. She earned a degree from Jackson State University, and studied at the Florida State University Creative Writing Programme and the Callaloo Creative Writing Workshop.

In 2026, she was shortlisted for the Women's Prize for Fiction for her debut novel Dominion. The Guardian called it "bruising, funny and deeply intelligent". The New York Times also reviewed it. The Atlantic called it "a dire morality tale about the suppression of desire".

She lives in New Orleans.

== Publications ==
- Dominion (2025)
