= Stephen Galway Adye =

British army officer (1772–1838)

Major-General Stephen Galway Adye CB
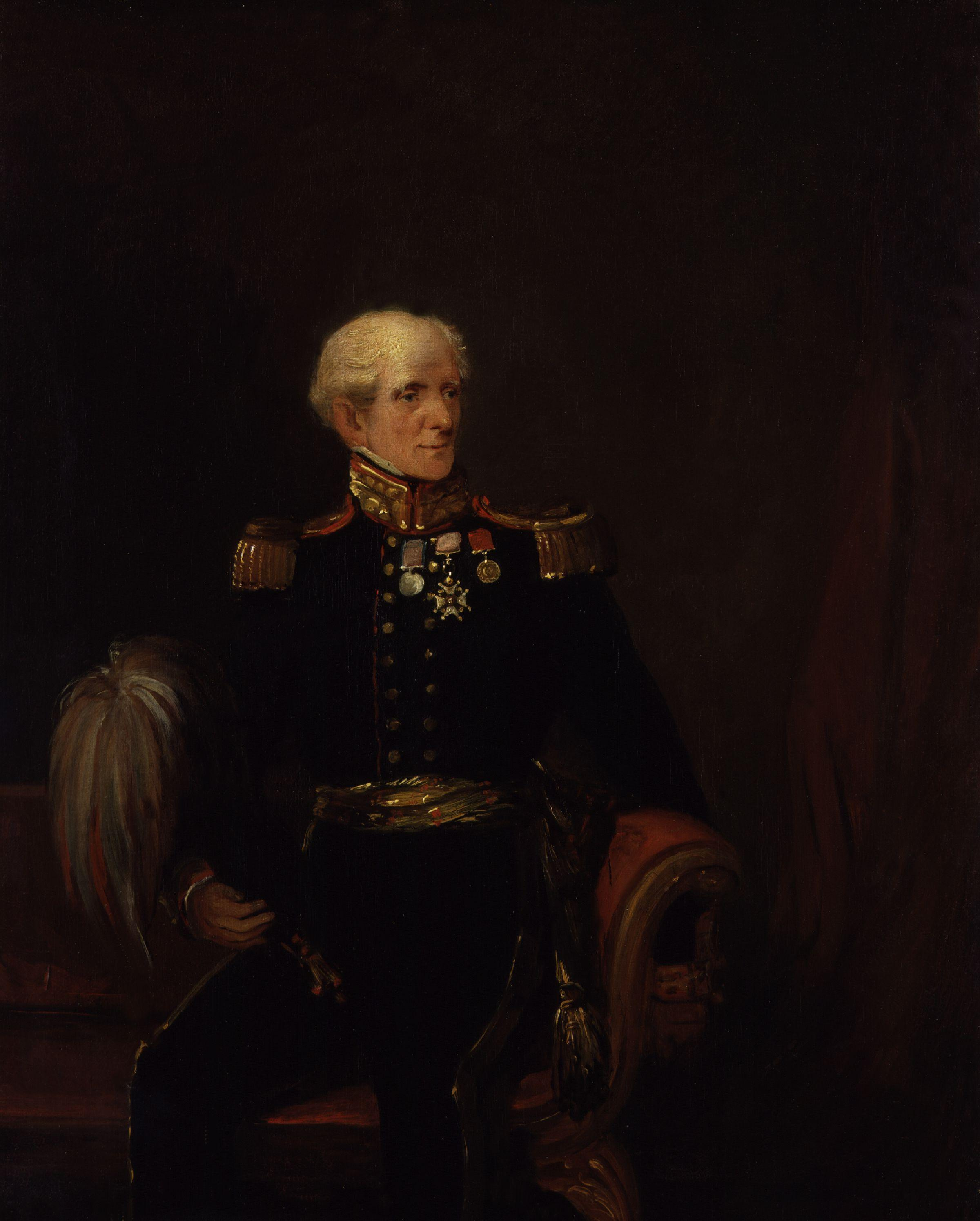
- Portrait by William Salter
- Born: 1772
- Died: 13 September 1838 (aged 66)
- Military career
- Allegiance: United Kingdom
- Branch: British Army
- Rank: Major-General
- Conflicts: Egyptian Campaign; Napoleonic Wars; Walcheren Campaign; Battle of Waterloo

Stephen Galway Adye CB (1772 – 13 September 1838) was a British Army officer who fought at the Battle of Waterloo.

== Career ==
The second son of Stephen Payne Adye, he was appointed first lieutenant in the Royal Artillery on 1 January 1794. Promotion to captain lieutenant followed in 1798 and to captain in 1803. He served under General Abercromby in the 1801 Egyptian Campaign against the French, and was part of the 1809 expedition to Walcheren, during which he was seriously wounded.

At Waterloo he was a field officer in command of two batteries of foot artillery attached to an army division, and was subsequently made a Companion of The Most Honourable Order of the Bath (CB).

Adye later became Chief Firemaster at the Royal Laboratory in Woolwich, London.

Adye was promoted to major-general on 10 January 1837.

== Death and legacy ==
Adye was commemorated by a memorial, now destroyed, in St Mary's Churchyard, Woolwich with the following inscription:

"Beneath this stone are deposited the mortal remains of Mary, wife of Brigade Major Adye, who died 20 September 1809, at the age of 37. Also of Major General Stephen Galway Adye CB husband to the above Mary Adye who died on 13 September 1838, at the age of 66."
