= McDan Group of Companies =

Ghanaian organization

McDan Group
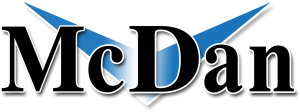
- Company type: Private
- Industry: Shipping
- Founded: 1999
- Founders: Daniel McKorley
- Headquarters: Accra, Greater Accra, Ghana
- Area served: Ghana, Sierra Leone, Liberia & Equatorial Guinea
- Key people: Daniel McKorley
- Services: Land transports, Sea freight, Air freight, Logistics
- Owner: Daniel McKorley
- Number of employees: 51-100
- Divisions: McDan Shipping Company, McDan Aviation & McDan Logistics
- Website: www.mcdanshipping.com

The McDan Group is a Ghanaian transportation and logistics company with operations in freight forwarding for land transports, sea freight, air freight and contract logistics. The headquarters of the company is in Accra, Ghana. It has presence in Sierra Leone, Liberia and Equatorial Guinea.

== History ==
The McDan Group of Companies was founded by Ghanaian business magnate Daniel McKorley in 1999. It has three divisions; McDan Shipping Company, McDan Aviation, and McDan Logistics. Today the company specializes in domestic maritime services, warehousing (bonded and non-bonded), diplomatic movements, removal services (household and corporate), courier services, hauling, project cargo movement, ground handling, heavy duty movement, cross boarder transportation, aviation cargo experts and chartered flights. The shipping unit of the company is the first and only Freight Forwarding Company to obtain the Air Carrier Licence in handling chartered cargo flights in Ghana and currently has the GSA for Global Aviation in West Africa.

In 2019, McDan acquired a license to operate a private jet section at the Accra International Airport.

== The McDan Foundation ==
The McDan Foundation is a charitable foundation of The McDan Group of Companies.

== Awards ==
- Brand of the Year Award, Ghana Shippers Awards 2019
- Excellence in Corporate Social Responsibility, Ghana Shippers Awards 2019
- 2015 Best Automotive and Transportation Company of the year, Association of Ghana Industries (AGI).
- Freight Forwarder of the Year, National Aviation Awards 2017

== Controversy ==
GACL in a letter dated January 28, 2022, directed McDan Aviation to suspend the commissioning ceremony following some alleged breaches.

The Ghana Airport Company, in the letter to McDan, said it had “engaged in several activities without prior approval from GACL which have typically called for emergency corrective actions.”
