= Krobo people =

Ethnic group in Ghana

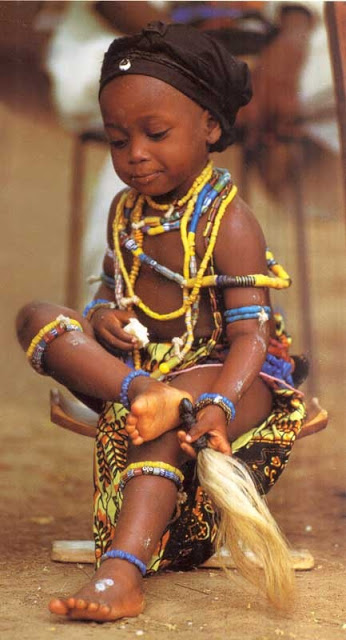
A Krobo girl undertaking Dipo ceremony

The Krobo people are an ethnic group in Ghana. They are grouped as part of the Ga-Adangbe ethnolinguistic group, and they are also the largest group of the seven Dangme ethnic groups of Southeastern Ghana. The Krobo are a farming people who occupy Accra Plains, Akuapem Mountains and the Afram Basin.

== History ==
The Krobo people are from the Eastern Region of Ghana and are divided into two groups: the Manya and the Yilo. The exact date of this division remains unknown. In earlier years, the Government of Ghana referred to Manya Krobo as Eastern Krobo and Yilo Krobo as Western Krobo. Since then, the Krobo have been administered as two separate states, known today as Manya and Yilo Krobo.

The two Krobo traditional areas were originally known as "Nɔwe" (Mănyă), meaning "one's home", and "Nyέwe" (Yilɔ). The name Manya is derived from maonya, meaning "keep your mouth shut", which relates to the saying nɔ bi nya me tee, meaning "one does not need to talk about everything one sees". Yilo comes from the expression wa yilɔ, meaning "we don't eat this". According to oral traditions, when the Yilo returned from Krobo Denkyera, they had lost many of their indigenous Krobo customs. To be reaccepted into society, they underwent a series of acculturation rites, including guidance about which foods were taboo to the Krobo. As the Yilo frequently asked about the acceptability of various Akan foods they had learnt to eat, the resident Krobo began calling them wa yilɔ.

The Krobo are the largest of the Ga-Adangme-speaking peoples. Located in the mountains just inland from the coast, they constitute the fourth largest ethnic group in Ghana. During the 19th century, they were one of the small states of the Gold Coast in their formative stages of political and cultural development. After the mid-19th century, they became one of the most economically and politically significant groups in the country, known for their dominant role in commercial export crop production and beadmaking.

=== Journey to Krobo Mountain ===
The Dangme people initially travelled as one group, splitting into seven distinct groups only after arriving in Ghana. The location of their separation was named "Lɔlɔvɔ", an Ewe term meaning "love is finished/ended", now known as the Tagologo Plains.

These seven Dangme groups were the Krobo, Ada, Prampram, Shai, Ningo, Osu-Doku and Kpone. After the split, each group took different paths: the Osudoku people ascended the Osudoku mountain, the Ada people moved to the east coast, the Shai, Prampram and Kpone people ventured inland, and the Ningo people headed southward to the coast. The Krobo people continued westward until they discovered a 1,108-foot-high (338 m) mountain divided by a gorge into two unequal sections. They viewed this mountain as an ideal settlement location, as its difficult ascent would provide natural protection against invading tribes. Two hunters – Aklo Muase (Aklo Natebi) and Madja – were dispatched by priests to evaluate the mountain's suitability for settlement.

Their favourable report led to the mountain being named "Klo yo" (Krobo Mountain). The name "Krobo" itself has Akan origins, derived from Kro-obo-so-Foɔ, meaning "town of rock/mountain dwellers".

=== Life on Krobo Mountain ===
Krobo Mountain became the cultural and ritual center of the Krobo people. The settlement featured remarkable stone houses, some multiple stories high with up to 20–30 rooms. Visiting missionaries noted that the architecture was unprecedented in their experience in Africa.

The Krobo developed an innovative water system to sustain their growing population. As their numbers increased beyond the mountain's capacity, people began establishing settlements in surrounding areas. Through the Krobo Huza system of land acquisition, they peacefully expanded their territory in what anthropologist Field termed the "bloodless conquest". The mountain remained their religious and cultural centre until their eventual eviction.

=== Krobo military ===
From the 17th century onwards, Krobo Mountain faced numerous attacks from invading tribes. The Krobo people won against these invasions until the British military's introduction of rockets and rifle fire finally overcame their defenses.

=== Eviction from Krobo Mountain ===
Krobo Mountain served as both the spiritual and physical home of the Krobo people, being their first settlement after separating from other Dangme groups at Lɔlɔvɔ. The mountain's strategic position offered ideal protection during times of warfare, with the Krobo defending themselves by rolling boulders down the mountainside, killing enemies and preventing their advance.

As the population grew, many Krobos began working on farms in the surrounding lowlands, but the mountain remained their cultural centre where all significant rituals took place. Girls undergoing the Dipo rite of passage traditionally spent one to three years on the mountain completing their customs. The Djemli (priests) were forbidden to leave the mountain overnight. With ancestors buried in family homes on the mountain, it became both a spiritual and literal ancestral home. It was taboo for the Djemli (priests) to leave the mountain overnight. Moreover, as their ancestors were buried in family homes on the mountain, the mountain became the ancestral home not just spiritually but literally.

This mountain settlement posed challenges for the colonial government, who found it difficult to monitor and control the population. Reports suggested that the mountain's seclusion enabled the practice of warrior cults and the violation of colonial laws, such as the requirement to bury the dead in designated cemeteries. The colonial government labelled it a "fetish mountain", and in 1892, Governor Griffiths enacted the Native Customs Ordinance to remove the Krobo people from their ancestral home.

The governor gave residents three days to evacuate the mountain. For many Krobo people living in surrounding communities, this timeframe was insufficient to retrieve all their belongings. People could only carry what they could manage, leaving the rest behind. The colonial government then sent soldiers to destroy their personal possessions, including houses, shrines, pots and ancient trees.

This forced evacuation remains a significant historical trauma for the Krobo people. To commemorate this event, both the Manya and Yilo Krobo communities organise annual pilgrimages to the mountain during their Ngmayem and Kloyosikplem festivals.

== Gallery ==
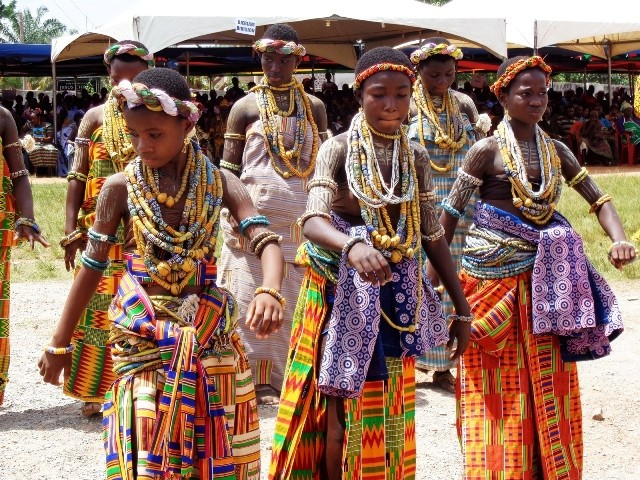
A Krobo girl undertaking Dipo ceremony

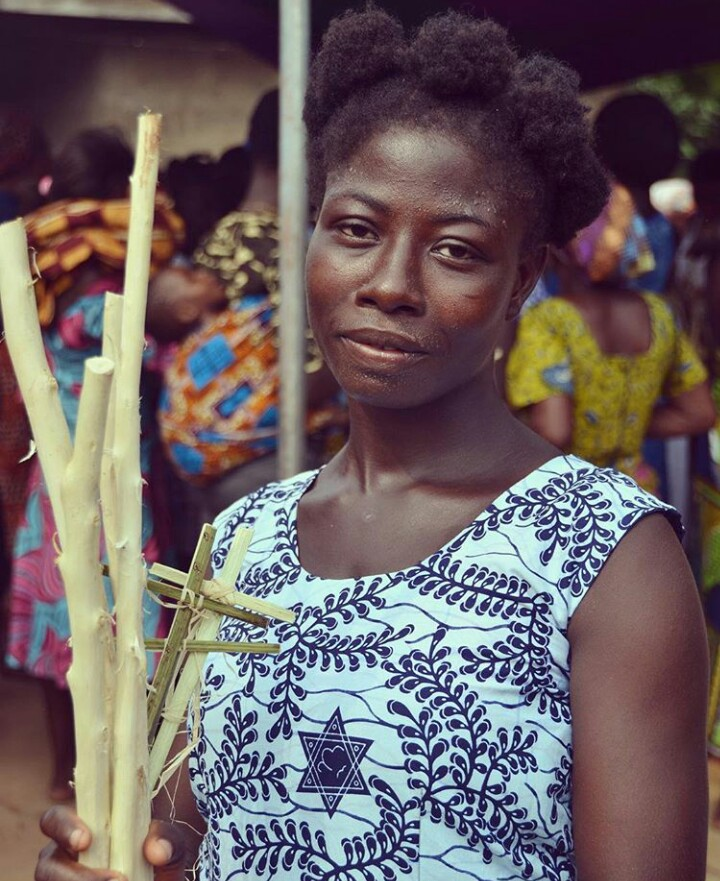
A Krobo woman with a tribal mark for identification

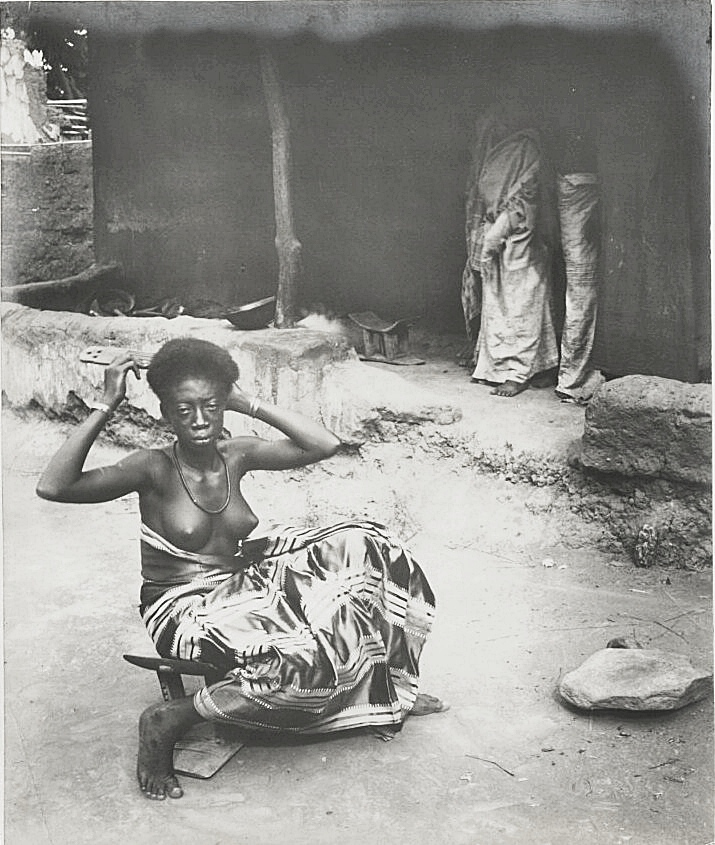
Krobo girl dressing her hair, late 19th century

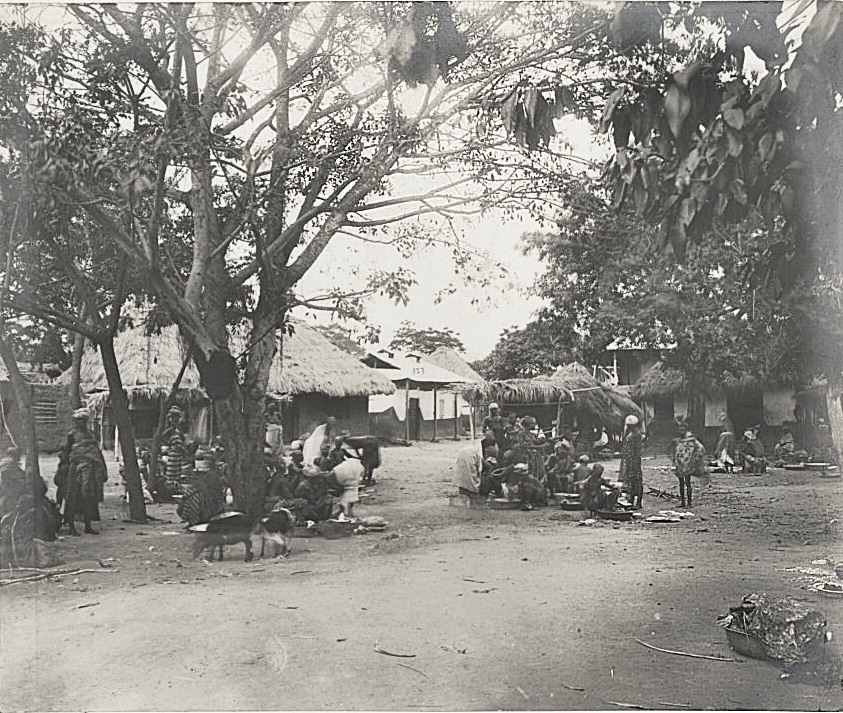
Marketplace in Krobo country, late 19th century

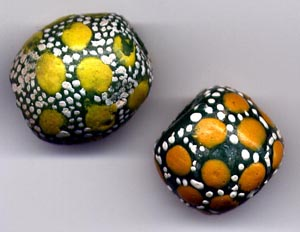
Krobo beads

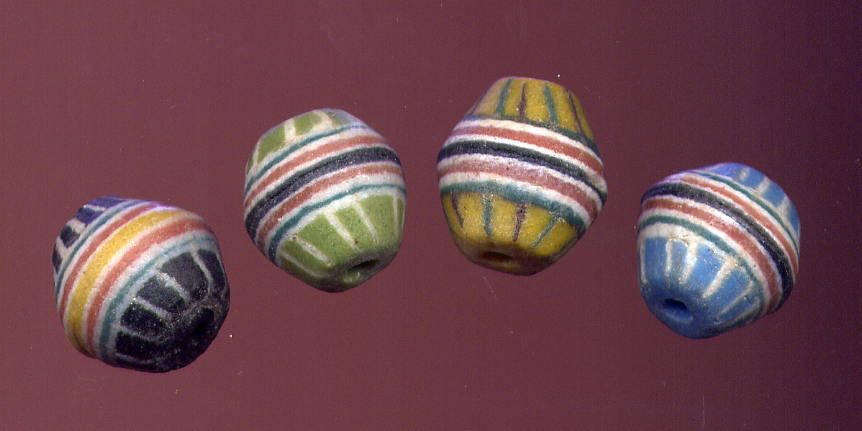
Powdered glass Krobo beads

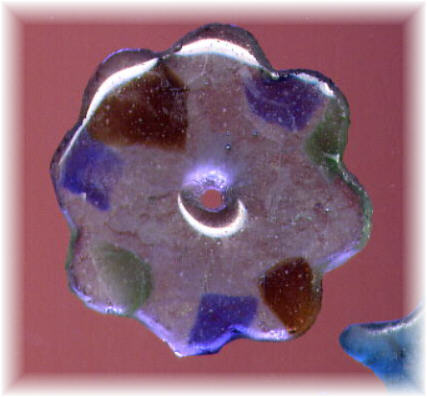
Krobo bead made of fused glass fragments

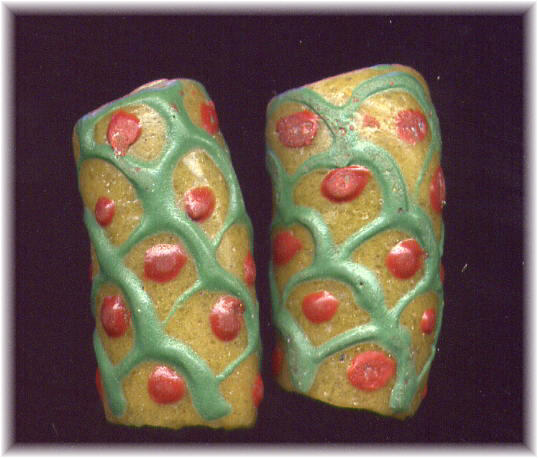
Krobo "writing" bead
