= Obo Addy =

Ghanaian musician (1936–2012)

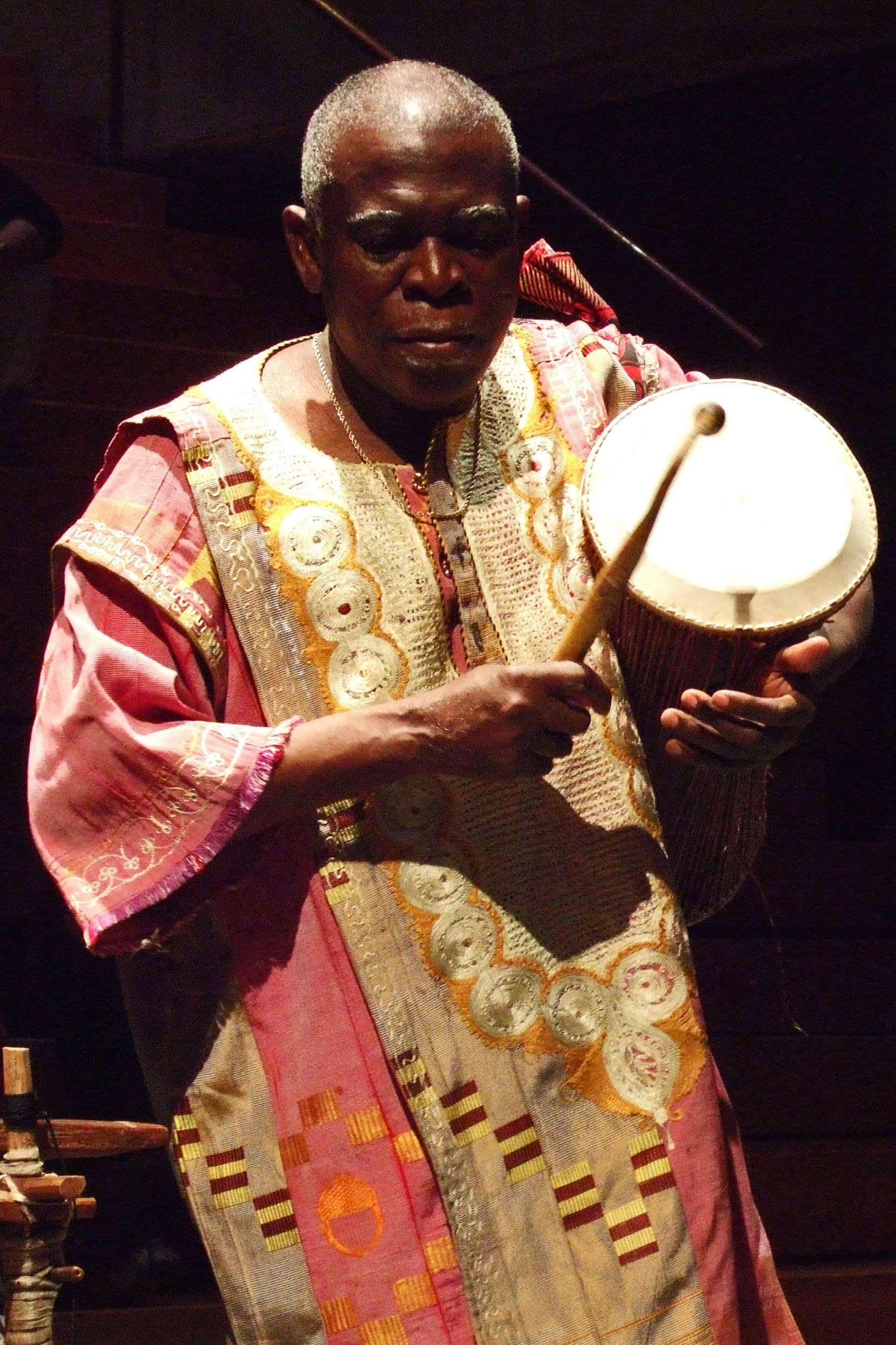
- Addy in 2009

Background information
- Born: January 15, 1936; Accra, Ghana
- Died: September 13, 2012 (aged 76) Portland, Oregon, U.S.
- Genres: Worldbeat
- Occupations: Musician, dancer, professor
- Instrument: Drum
- Years active: 1969–2012

Obo Addy (January 15, 1936 – September 13, 2012) was a Ghanaian drummer and dancer who was one of the first native African musicians to bring the fusion of traditional folk music and Western pop music known as worldbeat to Europe and then to the Pacific Northwest of the United States in the late 1970s. He taught music at Lewis & Clark College in Portland, Oregon.

== Biography ==
Addy, born into the Ga ethnic group in Accra, the capital city of Ghana, was one of the 55 children of Jacob Kpani Addy, a wonche or medicine man who integrated rhythmic music into healing and other rituals. Obo Addy's earliest musical influence was the traditional music of the Ga people, but he was also influenced as an adolescent by popular music from Europe and the United States, and performed in local bands that played Westernized music and the dance music of Ghana known as highlife. The Kronos Quartet commissioned a string quartet from Addy for their 1992 album Pieces of Africa.

Addy was employed by the Arts Council of Ghana in 1969, and played his native Ga traditional music in the 1972 Summer Olympics in Munich, Germany. He moved to London, England, and began touring in Europe. In 1978, he moved to Portland, Oregon in the United States, where he taught at Lewis & Clark College. He also led weekly drumming workshops at Portland's Lincoln High School.

In 1989, he established the Homowo African Arts and Cultures organization, a non-profit that sponsors the annual Homowo Festival of African Arts in Oregon. The organization was later renamed as the Obo Addy Legacy Project.

Addy died on September 13, 2012, following a prolonged battle with liver cancer. He was survived by his wife, Susan, and his six children, two stepchildren, and nine grandchildren. One of Addy's son's, Alex, continues to teach Ghanaian drumming at Lewis & Clark College.

== Awards and honors ==
He was awarded a Master's Fellowship from the Oregon Arts Commission and Regional Arts & Culture Council, along with the Oregon Governors Award for the Arts. In 1996, he became the first native African to win a National Heritage Fellowship from the National Endowment for the Arts, which is the highest honor in the folk and traditional arts in the United States.

== Recent albums ==
- AfieyeOkropong (Alula Records)
- Wonche Bi (Alula Records)
- Let Me Play My Drums (Burnside Records)
- The Rhythm Of Which A Chief Walks Gracefully (Earthbeat Records)
- Okropong (Santrofi Records)
