= King Bruce =

Ghanaian musician

- Born: June 3, 1922; James Town, Accra, Gold Coast
- Died: September 12, 1997
- Occupations: Composer; band leader; musician; multi‑instrumentalist
- Known for: Highlife music; founder of The Black Beats; leadership in MUSIGA

King Bruce (3 June 1922 – 12 September 1997) was a Ghanaian composer, band leader and musician.

== Background ==
Composer, arranger, band leader and multi-instrumentalist made his mark on Ghana's dance band highlife tradition in a variety of ways. Born in James Town, Accra, Gold Coast (present-day Ghana).

== Early life ==
In secondary school, King encountered and learned principles of Western music as well as songs from other Ghanaian ethnic groups, especially Twi and Ewe. But his parents did not envisage a career in music and sent him for two years to London to study with an eye to a career in the civil service. There, however, King learned to play the trumpet. When he returned to Accra in 1951, he fell into the city's fledgling highlife scene and soon found himself playing in Teacher Lamptey's Accra Orchestra.

== The Black Beats ==
The next year, King co-founded the group whose name, if not its membership, would remain with him all his life: The Black Beats. The name reflected a heartfelt loyalty to African rhythms and feelings in his then colonial context. However, the swing sounds coming out of the United States definitely qualified as African, and swing was an important element in the Black Beats' sound, which featured a strong vocal lineup. In 1961, nine Black Beats members defected to form the Ramblers, and King Bruce had to find new members. The new member were all young musicians - the most notable was a young trumpeter Anthony Foley from Mr Hammond's Brass Band. He became the lead trumpeter but later left for England. Other members of the group were Bengo Blay sax, Stanley Lokko sax, Jimi sax, Jerry Bampoe guitar. George Ofori and Quarcoo were vocals. Six years later, he was forced to choose between his semi-professional band and his civil service career. His pocketbook dictated the decision, and he handed off leadership of the band to another member.

== Union of Ghanaian musicians ==
During the 1970s, King got involved in organizing unions of musicians. He would be involved with three during his life, notably the Musician's Union of Ghana (MUSIGA), formed in 1974, and still going today. In 1977, he retired from the civil service and returned to music. But his later years were most noteworthy for the work he did in teaching other musicians. King's house in James Town, Accra, became the home base for as many as seven bands, all of whom benefited from his experience, leadership and instruction. When he died in 1997, he left behind many protégés, and his work will be felt in Ghana for years to come. John Collins and Banning Eyre wrote an article and biography on his life.

== Sources ==
- Afropop.org article
- Ghanaweb.com article
