= Jerry Hansen (musician) =

Ghanaian highlife musician

- Born: John William Hansen; 23 February 1927; Bekwai, Ashanti Region, Gold Coast
- Died: 7 April 2012 (aged 85) Accra, Greater Accra Region, Ghana
- Genres: Highlife
- Occupations: Musician; songwriter; composer; Singer
- Instruments: vocals; saxophone; conga; trumpet; trombone
- Labels: Decca

John William Hansen (23 February 1927 – 7 April 2012) popularly known as Jerry Hansen was a Ghanaian highlife musician. He was a singer, a composer, an arranger, a saxophonist and a pioneer of highlife music. He was the bandleader and founder of the Ramblers International Band. He was a founding member and the first president of the Musicians Union of Ghana (MUSIGA).

== Early life and education ==
Jerry Hansen was born at Asante Bekwai on 23 February 1927 to Maami Senkire and Johney Hansen, a pharmacist. He was named John William Hansen. He had his early education at Seventh Day Adventist (SDA) School at Bekwai, where he was first exposed to music. He was inspired by his teacher Mr. Stoke who played the accordion and sung at church. In 1939 Hansen left Bekwai to continue his early education at the Methodist School in Koforidua. He enrolled at Achimota School for his secondary education, there he interacted and learned from musical icons such as; Ms. Parnell and Mr. Philip Gbeho. Due to dire financial circumstances for which Hansen was unable to pay his school fees, he had to leave Achimota School. He later joined the Accra Academy where he completed his secondary education after obtaining his Oxford and Cambridge certificates in 1947.

== Career ==
Shortly after his secondary education, Hansen was employed by United Africa Company. After two years of working with UAC, Hansen was offered a scholarship to train as an optical mechanic, specializing in the maintenance of cameras and microscopes among others in Germany. In Germany, Hansen met the Ramblers; the Netherlands based orchestra which performed in the German city of Stuttgart in the 1950s and 1960s. He had a keen interest in their brand of music and decided to visit the group in their hotel. He managed to strike an acquaintance with the members of the group. He found out they were not full-time musicians but professionals; medical practitioners, lecturers among others. This helped him appreciate that one could do music and still be in his/her profession.

== Music ==
=== Early days ===
On his return to Ghana, Hansen's interest in music made him join the Accra Orchestra in 1949. King Bruce was one of its members. He learned how to play the saxophone and clarinet from the group. He later joined the Accra Rhythmic Orchestra as one of their percussionists specifically playing the conga. He also helped in arranging and packing their instruments because he was not that versatile on his instruments. Hence the only way he could gain entrance into their performances was by loading and off loading their equipment. Over time, he improved on his instrument after he had met famous musicians like Joe Kelly, Tommy Gripman and E.T. Mensah at the Accra Rhythmic Orchestra. He became a good saxophonist but could not read the musical score. To learn how to read the musical score, he joined the city orchestra in the 1950s. He returned to the Accra Orchestra in 1951 after learning to read the musical score. Amongst the members of the Accra Orchestra he had met when he joined the group in 1949, Saka Acquaye was the only old member left and there was no one to play the trumpet and trombone. Hansen learned to play the trumpet and trombone through the aid of Saka Acquaye. Hansen however never got a chance to play for the Accra Orchestra until its collapse after all his experiences. King Bruce and Saka Acquaye formed a band known as the Black Beats in 1952 and convinced Jerry Hansen to join it. Hansen played for the Black Beats from 1952 until 1961.

=== Ramblers International Band ===
In 1961 he founded; the Ramblers International Band with Eddie Owoo, Frank Coffie, Kwesi Forson, Aryee Hammond and a few others (nine in total). He later recruited five other musicians to join the band. The band came into existence through the efforts of one Mr. Zakkour who was the manager of Metropole Hotel. Mr. Zakkuor persistently kept coming to Hansen's office to convince him to start a new band. Mr. Zakkuor promised to sponsor the band with instruments. When Mr. Hansen formed the band, Mr. Zakkuor brought the instruments to his surprise and also offered his hotel premises as a place the band could rehearse and also keep the instruments. In 1962, the band recorded under Decca's record label releasing singles and LPs, some of which include; "Eka Wonko A", "Saana Owu Bo Fie", "Murusu Maye Den", "Abonsam Fireman", "Oburoni Woewu", "Antie Christie", "Oyi Edze", "Owu Nnye" and "Kae Dabi", "Ponko Abodam". They also had two compilations that year; The Fabulous Ramblers and Encores. That same year the Ghana government sponsored the band as they toured some eighteen African countries including; Nigeria, Sierra Leone, Senegal, Kenya and the Gambia.

In 1963, the band continued with hits such as; "Kosor Kopor", "Mitee Momo", "Nyimpa Dasenyi", "Work And Happiness", "Womma Wonka", "Wegya Saman" and "Ewuraba Artificial", "Obra Rehwem".

Nana Ampadu joined the band briefly in 1964. After he and Hansen had struck an acquaintance he gave Hansen eight songs for free which he recorded with the band. These songs included hit tracks; "Afutusem", "Ntoboase", "Me Nsoromma Bepue" and, "Scholarship". After this encounter, Hansen introduced Nana Ampadu to recording publishers; Phillips West Africa Ltd., and Nana Ampadu was given a chance to record two songs. That same year the band released; "Akokonini Abankwaa", "Owu", "Meni Nda Obiara So", "Agyanka Dabre", "Nyame Mbere" "Knock On Wood", and "Brode Kokoo".

The band was given serious publicity and support from the Nkrumah government. In 1965 Hansen gained a government scholarship to study Photo and Forensic Laboratory management at Czechoslovakia. There, he had a rare chance of doing musical gigs with Karel Velebný; a famous jazz musician and his S & H Quintet (Spejbl and Huvínek Quintet) in Prague.

In 1967 the band released two compilations; Dance with the Ramblers and Dance with the Ramblers (LP, Comp) under Decca record label. That same year the band was sponsored by the Ghana Union of Great Britain and Ireland to embark on a six-week tour of the United Kingdom. They performed in Birmingham, Leeds, Liverpool, London and Manchester. They toured Czechoslovakia that same year.

The band also performed in the United States of America and for the Ghana National Trust Fund and other charitable organizations.

In 1971, the band released an album entitled; Doin' Our Own Thing. In 1974, Hansen helped found the Musicians Union of Ghana (MUSIGA) and was elected president of the union. In 1976 and 1977 the band released albums; Ramblers International and Ramblers International (LP) respectively. The deteriorating economic situation of the country in the early 1980s made it impossible for the band to continue. Hansen left for the United States of America where he spent most of his later years. Hansen went on to release over 200 songs until his death.

== Awards ==
He received an award at the maiden Music of Ghanaian Origin Dinner and Awards night in 2011, for his contribution to live band music in Ghana.

== Personal life ==
He was married to Rosemary Mark Hansen. Together they had seven children. His interests were football, listening to music, reading and writing.

== Death ==
Hansen died on Saturday morning 7 April 2012 at the Korle Bu Teaching Hospital after battling an ailment.

== See also ==
List of Ghanaian musicians
