= Mustapha Tettey Addy =

Ghanaian drummer

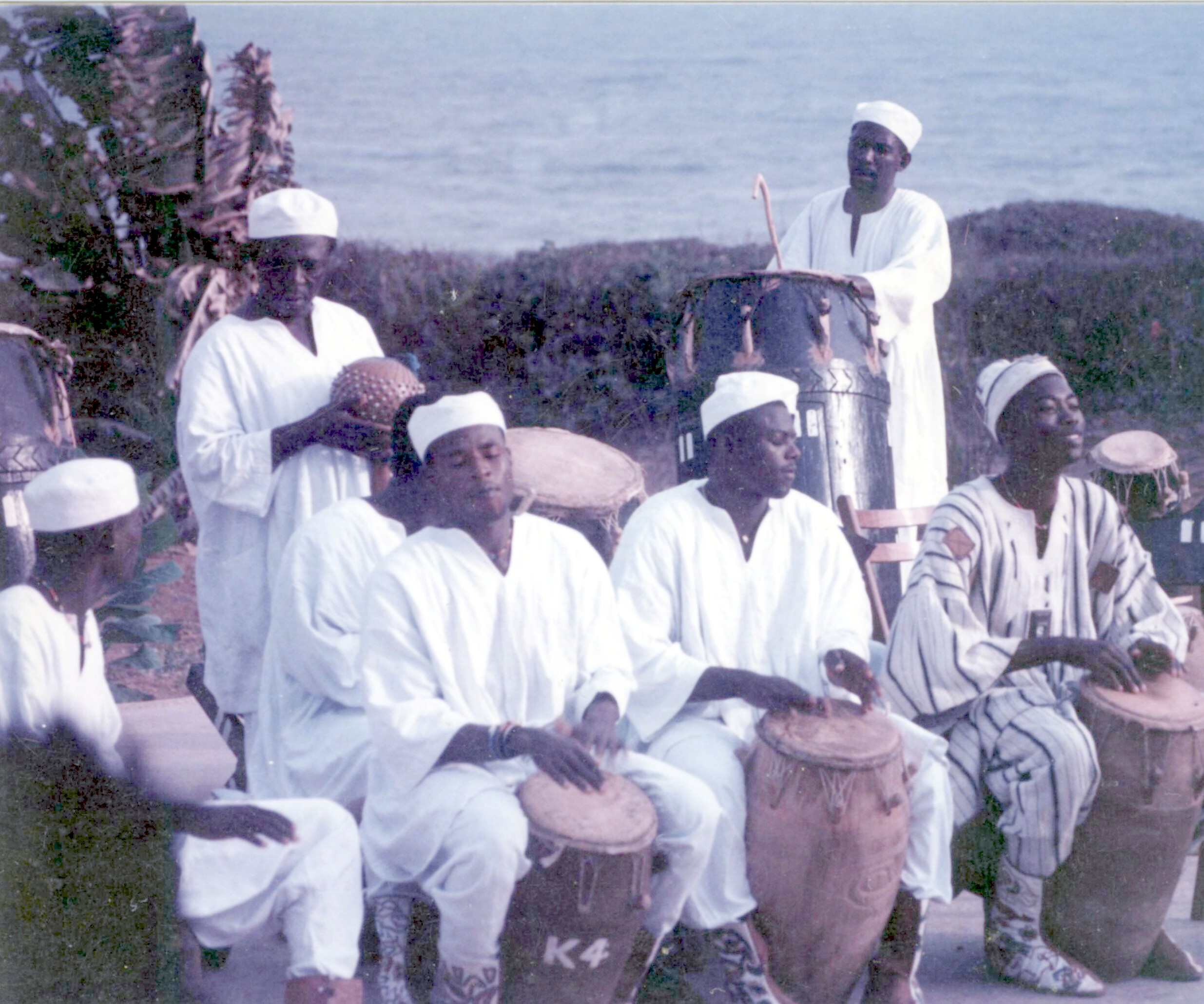
- Mustapha Tettey Addy's Obonu Drummers at Kokrobite

Background information
- Born: 1942 (age 83–84); Accra, Ghana
- Genres: Ga Music
- Occupation: Master Drummer

Mustapha Tettey Addy (born 1942 in Avenor, Accra, Ghana) is a Ghanaian master drummer and ethnomusicologist.

== Early life ==
Addy was born in Avenor, a small Ga village outside Accra, in 1942. He was born into a musical family, and as such, learned traditional Ga drumming from early in his life. Addy's father, Okonfo Akoto Addy, was a Akan priest and doctor in the early 1960s. Okonfo Akonto had ten wives, so he had many children. As drummers are an essential element of his craft, he trained several of his sons in traditional Ga drumming. Mustapha's siblings include Yacub and Obo.

== Career ==
In 1963, Addy's father died. Following this, he was appointed as master drummer by his family. Around this time, he learned from various master drummer, including Husunui Afadi Adono Ladzekpo. Addy toured the country and did television appearances. He attended the University of Ghana from 1963 through 1965.

As a child, Addy had an interest in playing football. Due to his father's strict style of raising, he wasn't allowed to. It was only after his father died that he began playing football recreationally. Addy later said that football had been his passion and he was forced into music by his friends and family.

In the mid-1960s began researching and collecting Ghanaian folk music. He travelled across the country, collecting music in a variety of languages and styles. He also conducted ethnomusicologist tours in Ivory Coast, Togo, and Nigeria.

Addy first toured outside of Ghana in 1964. Following this, over the next several decades, he toured Africa and Western Europe extensively, Germany in particular. He has also toured the United Kingdom and United States. Between 1972 and 1981, Addy released seven albums on the Tangent, Arion and Insel Hombroich labels.

During the 1970s, he lived in Europe. He lived in London, Essen, and Düsseldorf. While living in Düsseldorf, he formed the band Ehimomo with his nephew Aja. In his spare time, he also worked as an architect.

In 1982, Addy moved back to Ghana. He joined the Institute of African Studies at the University of Ghana. In 1998, Addy founded the Academy of African Music and Arts (AAMA) at Kokrobite beach near Accra. The school teaches traditional Ghanaian music, as well as Pan-African styles of music. The AAMA was the first private music school in Ghana.

Addy toured with Ghana's National Dance Ensemble.

In 1986, Addy formed The Drummers, who would later go on to be known as The Obonu Drummers.

Between 1990 and 1999, Addy released six albums on the German Weltwunder label. In 1992 and 1993, Addy and The Obonu Drummers performed at several World of Music, Arts and Dance festivals.

== Discography ==
- Master Drummer From Ghana (Lyrichord Discs, 1972)
- Les Percussions Du Ghana (Arion, 1980)
- African Ritual Music (Insel Hombroich, 1984)
- Solo Drumming (Insel Hombroich, 1984)
- Come & Drum (WeltWunder, 1994)
- Secret Rhythms (WeltWunder, 1997)
- Come and Dance (Weltwunder, 2003)
- Smart Boys, with The Obonu Drummers (Weltwunder, 2005)
