= Mustapha Inusah =

Ghanaian celebrity Journalist

Attractive Mustapha
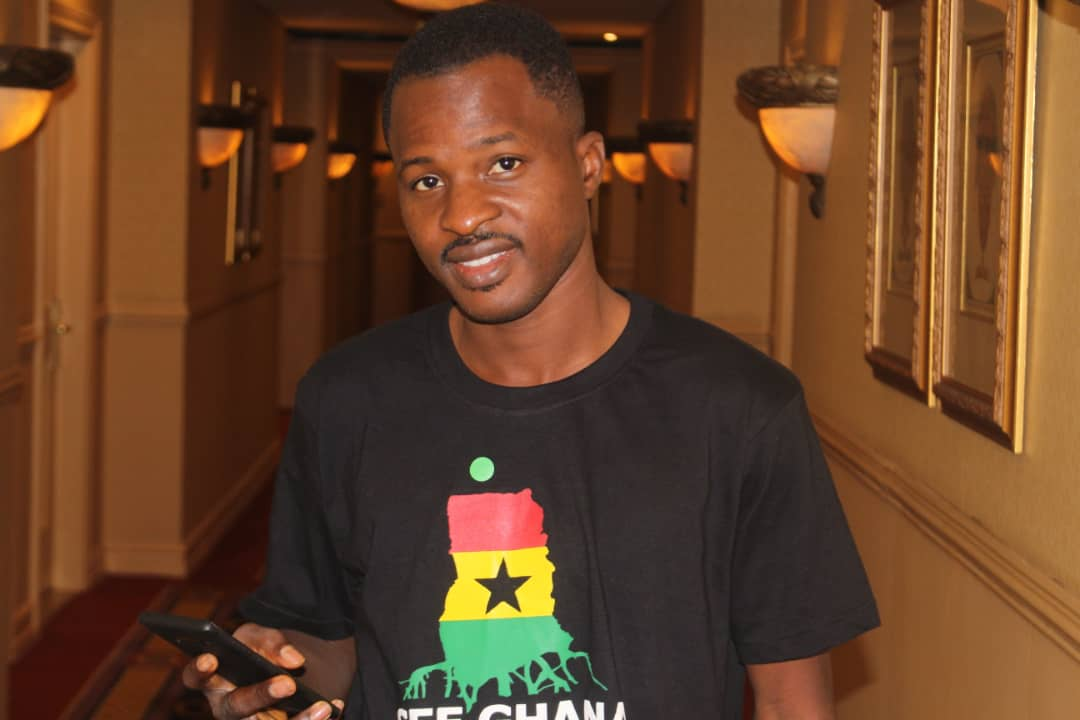
- Portrait of journalist Attractive Mustapha
- Born: Mustapha Nii Okai Inusah; Accra, Ghana
- Other names: Nii Attractive, Ayinde
- Education: African University College of Communications
- Occupations: Journalist, blogger
- Years active: 2005–present
- Known for: Gathering, investigating, assessing, creating, presenting news and information
- Website: attractivemustapha.com

Mustapha Nii-Okai Inusah, known professionally as Attractive Mustapha is a Ghanaian celebrity journalist and Blogger, CEO of Attractive Media, Attractive Productions, and a communications and IT expert. Attractive Mustapha was the 2017 Entertainment Journalist of the Year and national organizer for the Arts and Tourism Writers Association of Ghana.

== Early life and education ==
Attractive Mustapha was born in Accra, Ghana to a Ghanaian father of Ga-Adangbe and a Nigerian mother of Yoruba tribe respectively. He attended Wesley Grammar School where he had his secondary education and studied journalism at the Icon School of Journalism. Mustapha Inusah is an alumnus of the African University of Communication .

== Politics ==
Attractive Mustapha is a socialist who believes in changing the lives of the poor and making the country a better place for all. In 2012 he was appointed as coordinator for volunteers for ex-president John Dramani Mahama in tertiary schools in Ghana. In 2016, he became a coordinator for celebrities for John Mahama where he brought celebrities on board to campaign for John Dramani Mahama. From 2012 to 2016 he contributed to all the campaign songs the NDC used during their election campaigns.

== Career ==
During his Journalism school days, Attractive Mustapha worked as a media coordinator with popular Ghanaian sound engineer Jeff Tennyson Quaye known professionally as Jay Q who has been behind big hits in Ghana music for musicians including Buk Bak, VVIP, Castro, Mzbel, Obrafour, Daddy Lumba, Nana Acheampong, Ofori Amponsah, Akosua Agyapong, Obuoba J. A. Adofo, Wulomei, and others.

Mustapha joined the Flex Newspaper team to work with Samuel Baah known professionally as Sammy Flex who is the editor and publisher of flex newspaper. After 10 years of working with Flex newspaper, he moved to Pluzz fm and continued his journalism journey at Despite Group of companies as producer of Peace FM and Neat FM's political and entertainment show. He has worked with various companies including Razz Newspaper, Pluzz FM, Top radio, Venus films, Ghanadatabase.com, Ghanamusic.com, Modernghana.com, Ghanacreativearts.com, Nigeriafilms.com, RFA24, Socrate Safo's Movie Africa etc.

With over 10 years experience in Journalism, Attractive Mustapha has worked as a Public relations manager for celebrities including Van Vicker, John Dumelo, Jackie Appiah, Jim Iyke, Kalsoume Sinare, Kwaku Manu, etc. He is currently the Public relations officer for Zulu African Film Academy Awards (Zafaa) and Ghana music Awards UK.

=== Attractive Productions ===
In 2010, he established Attractive Productions with its subsidiaries, Attractive Films and Attractive Music. He produced his maiden movie titled Silent Writer which casts popular movie actors John Dumelo, among others.

== Honours and awards ==
Year	Event	Prize	Recipient/Nominated work	Result	Ref
2018	Commission on Culture and Canadian High Commission	Film certificate	Himself	Won	
2018	Ghana's Most Influential (GMI)	Entertainment journalist of the year	Himself	Won	
2017	People's Celebrity Awards	Entertainment journalist of the year	Himself	Won	
2013	African Golden Crown Award, Abidjan	Honorary	Himself	Honored	
2011	Nollywood and African Film Critics Awards	Most influential	Himself	Nominated	
2007	Zafaa Awards		Himself		
