= Zapp Mallet =

Ghanaian sound engineer

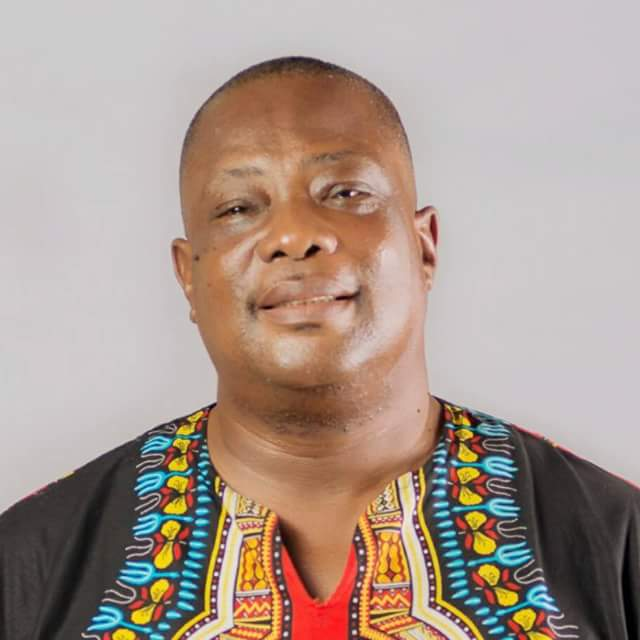

Background information
- Born: Emmanuel Mallet; Accra, Ghana, West Africa
- Origin: Ghana
- Genres: Highlife, Hiplife, Gospel, Reggae
- Occupation: record producer
- Years active: 1979

Emmanuel Mallet popularly known as Zapp Mallet is a veteran Ghanaian recording engineer and a record producer. He is recognized as one of the pioneers of the hiplife genre that started in the early 1990s in Ghana. He is also recognized as the only recording engineer to have won the Ghana Music Awards on three consecutive occasions; 1999, 2000, 2001.

== Early life and education ==
Zapp was born in Accra, Ghana. He had his secondary education at the Accra Academy from 1975 to 1982. He continued to the Kwame Nkrumah University of Science and Technology, Kumasi where he studied publishing skills for his bachelor's degree. Some of Zapp's earliest experiences in music were during his secondary school days when he played drums for the Accra Academy school band. At university level, he was able to add playing of the guitar and bass guitar to his art. He subsequently featured for various Christian groups with his art in Accra and Kumasi.

== Career ==
Zapp begun recording in various studios before establishing his own studio and company; Title Track Productions Limited. He first started recording at the ARC Studios in Tema, he moved to the C.H.M Studio in Accra and later moved to Kampsite. Prior to owning his own studio he recorded at T.L.C. Studio.

Over the years, Zapp has worked with various high-profile Ghanaian and international music artistes of various genres. Some of these artistes include; Kojo Antwi, Ofori Amponsah, Daasebre Gyamena, Nana Fynn, Becca, Irene Logan, Mary Agyepong, Nana Quame and Wutah all of the highlife circus. In the hiplife circus Zapp has worked with Reggie Rockstone, Lord Kenya, Obour, Obrafour and Akyeame. In the gospel genre he worked with; Tagoe Sisters, Suzzy and Matt and Helena Rhabbles.

In 2008, Zapp served on the Opening and Closing Ceremony Sub-Committee of the Confederation of African Nation football tournament (afcon) that was hosted by Ghana. He served as the music director and guitarist for the burger concert highlife tour that was organized by the Goethe-Institut in 2008 as part of Ghana's 51st independence day celebration. He has served as a resident judge and guest judge on various music shows, some of which include; Stars of the future, Mentor, Nestcafe African Revelation and the MTN Hitmaker show. He is a member of the Ghana Music Awards planning committee and a facilitator on WAPI; an Art showcase and interruptive platform organized by the British Council.

Zapp's interest is in the fusion of different genres of music such as Rock, Jazz, Orchestra and Pop blended with African rhythms to create new sounds.

In 2019, he revealed his intentions to contest for presidency of the Musicians Union of Ghana (MUSIGA). He was later on disqualified because he had not held an executive position in the association. Zapp has been a source of inspiration to many sound engineers in Ghana, notable amongst them is the legendary Hammer of The Last Two who was inspired to begin his career in sound engineering after meeting Zapp Mallet and seeing the equipments in his studio during the period when Zapp was recording Reggie Rockstone's album.

== Hiplife controversy ==
Hiplife generally is a Ghanaian music genre that fuses some elements of hip hop with highlife. The hiplife genre was founded in Ghana in the early 1990s. Zapp together with Michael Cooke coined the name hiplife when they were contemplating on what name could be given to the genre, they ended up with the name hiplife by blending the "hip" in hiphop with the "life" in highlife. The first artiste to record a song with the highlife genre is known to be Reggie Rockstone. His debut album, Makaa Maka, was the first hiplife album to be recorded. Zapp worked on some of Reggie's earliest recordings; agoo, Tsoo Boi and Night life in Accra. Zapp argues that Reggie couldn't be the only one to be credited with the founding of the hiplife music genre since there were others involved in making the music which include; the beat maker, the sound engineer, producers and others. Reggie on the other hand argues on the contrary that he was the sole founder of the genre. He added that Zapp didn't know much about rap music and he helped him understand the basics of rap music. Therefore, it wasn't possible for a person who knew little about a genre to claim to be a co-founder of the genre. Rex Omar the legendary Ghanaian highlife artiste joined the conversation saying Reggie was the first to do music in the hiplife genre however he first heard the name "hiplife" from Zapp. Reggie later apologised to Zapp for his utterances on television and radio regarding the conversation of who founded the hiplife genre. Reggie explained that his utterances were as a result of heightened tensions and the involvement of emotions. He believed Zapp's argument was an attempt to discredit him for creating a brand many young Ghanaian artistes benefit from.

== Awards and honours ==
Zapp's works have been recognized and awarded on various platforms. In 1994 he was adjudged; best Instrumentalist by the Entertainment Critics and Arts society of Ghana. He was adjudged Recording Engineer of the Year in the 2002 Ghana Music Awards. In the 2011 Ghana Music Awards he won the award for Producer of the Year.

== Personal life ==
Zapp married his wife Martha Mallet on 14 February 1993, together they have two daughters.

== See also ==
- Hiplife
