= Mark Okraku-Mantey =

Ghanaian music producer and politician

Deputy Minister for Tourism, Culture and Creative Arts
- Incumbent
- Assumed office 7 January 2021
- President: Nana Akufo-Addo
- Preceded by: Ziblim Barri Iddi

Personal details
- Born: 25 January 1974 (age 52) Nsawam, Eastern Region
- Party: New Patriotic Party
- Education: Central University
- Occupation: Music Producer, Artiste Manager, Politician
- Profession: Music Producer, Entertainment Administrator

Mark Okraku-Mantey (born 25 January 1974) is a Ghanaian music producer and politician. He is currently the Deputy Minister of Tourism, Culture and Creative Arts.

He is the founder and chief executive officer of Slip Mark Entertainment. Mark Okraku-Mantey has worked with several Ghanaian musicians including Lord Kenya, Kumi Guitar, Oheneba Kissi, Daasebre Gyamenah, Akyeame, and Adane Best.

Okraku-Mantey started out as a disc jockey in the 1990s at Joy FM and later became the Programs Manager at Hitz FM, both radio stations owned by Multimedia Group Limited.

== Early life and education ==
Okraku Mantey is a native of Ayensuano. He attended Datus Complex School (Bubuashie) for his basic school education and proceeded to St. Augustine's College in the Central region for his secondary school education. During his time at St. Augustine's, he was the first student to be allowed to play as official Disc Jockey for the school. He holds a bachelor’s degree in Marketing and an executive master’s degree in Leadership and Governance, both from Central University.

== Entertainment career ==
Okraku-Mantey began his career as a Disc Jockey in 1996 on Joy FM. He later transitioned into music production, assisting Ghanaian artistes in producing their music for airplay. That same year, he founded an entertainment and music company, Slip Music and Entertainment (now Slip Mark Entertainment), to produce music and manage artistes.

In 1998, Okraku-Mantey through Slip Music signed Lord Kenya, a then upcoming Hiplife artiste. He managed Kenya and produced most of his songs and albums including his hit album Sika Baa. He also worked with Highlife artiste Oheneba Kissi on his ABC of Love song and Dassebre Gyamena on Kokoko which featured Lord Kenya. Both songs were big hits and sold over 400,000 copies.

Okraku-Mantey has also worked with acts such as Akyeame, Adane Best, Joe Frazier, Kumi Guitar, Felix Bell among others. Some albums that he produced include Nana Tuffour’s – ‘Tontonte’, Kojo Ashkan’s – ‘Me Nse Ato Biso’, Felix Bell’s – ‘Butterfly’, Oheneba Kissi’s – ‘Kabiribiri Kyere Me’, Akyeame’s ‘Brebre Obaa Hemaa’, Lord Kenya’s ‘Sika’ and Daasebre Dwamena’s ‘Kokooko’.

At a point in his career, Okraku-Mantey ventured into the movie industry and became the executive producer for Efiewura, a popular Ghanaian comedy series which airs on TV3. He also served as a judge for several years for TV3 Mentor, a music reality established in 2006.

Okraku-Mantey is also a member of the Telecel Ghana Music Awards board. He was the Programs Manager at Hitz FM, a subsidiary of the Multimedia Group from February 2014 to March 2021.

In May 2018, he was awarded with the Ghana DJ Awards Lifetime Achievement Award at the Ghana DJ Awards for his service and contribution to the DJ profession in Ghana.

== Political career ==
Okraku-Mantey is a member of the New Patriotic Party and has been active in politics after publicly showing his support for the party prior to the 2016 Ghana Elections. He was a member of the team that drafted creative arts section of NPP manifesto for the 2016 and 2020 elections. He has since then been an active creative arts commentator, speaker and spokesperson for the party on several shows and events.

After the NPP won the 2016 elections, Okraku-Mantey was appointed as the President of the Creative Arts Council in 2017. In his role as the president of the council, he was instrumental in getting the Creative Arts Bill passed.

In April 2021, President Akufo-Addo nominated Okraku Mantey as the Deputy Ministry of Tourism, Culture and Creative Arts. There were opposing views prior to and after his nomination from other creative arts members especially dance hall artiste Shatta Wale and reggae artiste Blakk Rasta. He was vetted on 15 June 2021. At the vetting, there were notable creative arts individuals including musicians Samini, Wendy Shay, Kuami Eugene, actress Akofa Edjeani and award-winning playwright, Uncle Ebo Whyte, who were present to support him.

He was subsequently approved on 22 June 2021 and later sworn into office on 25 June 2021.

In July 2023, Okraku-Mantey picked his party's nomination forms to contest to become the Parliamentary candidate for the Ayensuano constituency (Ghana parliament constituency) in the 2024 elections. In November 2023, Okraku lost his bid to contest for parliament after he obtained 136 votes to lose to Ida Adwoa Asiedu who garnered 410 votes in the NPP primary.
