= Jay Q =

Ghanaian music producer (born 1977)

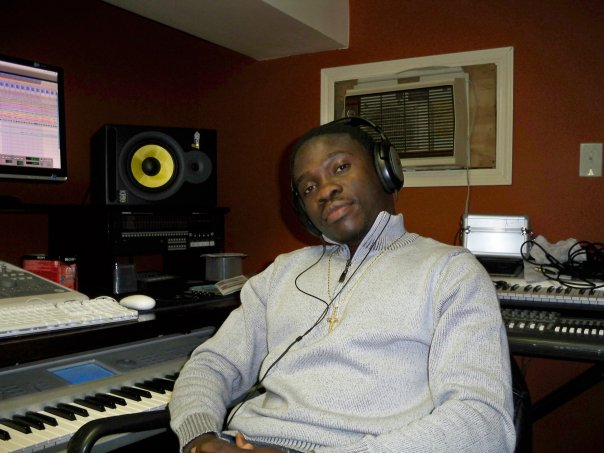
- Jay Q in Studio

Background information
- Also known as: Jay Q, JQ, Q-Lex, JayQ-Lex
- Born: Jeff Tennyson Quaye; Accra, Ghana
- Occupations: Record producer, sound engineer, keyboardist, songwriter, record executive
- Years active: 1996-present

Jeff Tennyson Quaye (born on December 24 in Osu), professionally known by his stage name Jay Q, is a Ghanaian musician, record producer, record executive, sound engineer, songwriter and keyboardist. He is the founder and current CEO of Q-Lex Entertainment and Jay-Qlex Recording Studio. He has produced albums for and overseen the careers of many musicians, including Buk Bak, VIP, Castro, Mzbel, Obrafour, Daddy Lumba, Nana Acheampong, Ofori Amponsah, Akosua Agyapong, Obuoba J. A. Adofo, Wulomei, and others. As a producer, Jay Q is credited as a key figure in the popularization of Hiplife, Highlife and Gospel. He introduced Jama (kpanlogo) into Hiplife, which became laudable and was accepted in Ghana, Africa and the rest of the world. In 2003, Jay Q won an award for Best Sound Engineer in Ghana.

== Early life ==
Jay Q was born and raised in Accra, Ghana, by Jeff Tennyson Quaye (snr) and Miss Comfort Adjin-Tettey. His church, Emmanuel Assemblies Of God, sponsored his keyboard studies at the Oriental School Of Music (Adabraka, Accra). He later joined Resurrection Power and Living Bread Ministries and met Fred Kyei Mensah (Fredyma Studio), who taught him music programming and introduced him to recording.

== Career ==
In the mid-to-late 1990s, his productions started getting airtime on radio.

In the late '90s, he worked with a lot of artists and different genres of music from Hi-life (Paapa Yaw Johnson, Alhaji K. Frimpong, George Jahraa, Obuoba J. A. Adofo, Sibo Brothers, Kaakieku, Pat Thomas, etc.,), Gospel (Suzzy and Matt, Jane and Dan, Osuani Afrifa, Andy Frimpong, Mr/Mrs Collins Nyantakyi, choirs, etc.), Cultural band and live band (Wulomei, Saneko, Adams family, etc.), hiplife (Bukbak, Vip, Exdoe, Oman Hene Pozo, etc.)... Jay Q's productions in the '90s were analog and recorded and produced in Combined House Of Music (CHM), Accra. In 2000, Technology was changing so fast that digital recordings were becoming popular and relegating analog recording to the back so Jay Q moved from CHM (an Analog Studio) where he used Cubase and Notator on the Atari computer to Virtual sound Lab (a fully Digital recording studio) and fell in love with Pro Tools on apple mac (and that's what he uses presently).

It was in Virtual Studio that Jay Q experimented with what has made him a world phenomenon, the Jama/Kpanlogo he introduced to hiplife with Bukbak's track "I'm going to come" that met so much criticism since hiplife at the time was mostly hip-hop and undefined. The movement became so popular and uncontrollable (as other producers and engineers also got initiated into it, and gradually, music publicists and journalists saw it as the true definition of hilife. The core of the Jama/Kpanlogo rhythm is the fusion of indigenous instruments such as the congas, cowbell, maracas, claps, whistle, brass and guitars, jembe, gome, etc.

Jay Q moved from Virtual to Hush Hush Studio in 2002 and in 2003 he won best recording engineer of the year in the Ghana music awards in Ghana and the following year in the UK for the track "Ahomka Wo Mu" by VIP. Jay Q formed a record company called Q-Lex Entertainment which he used to nature talents and executive produce them. He mostly helped these artistes with lyrics and composition. Some of the artists he discovered and financed their debut recordings are Castro, 4×4, Dr. Doh, etc. In January 2012, Jay Q bought Hush Hush Studio.

== Abroad ==
In 2003, he performed with BukBak at a world music festival in Gothenburg (Sweden), and they recorded some tracks there. Sooner, Ghanaian musicians abroad started requesting his services and in 2006 to 2007, he made several appearances to UK and recorded so many Ghanaian artistes based there, including Yoggi Doggi, Deeba Mama B, Howls of Lords etc. Ghanaians in the States heard of his trips to the UK and in summer 2007, he made his first trip to the States to record musicians. He later became resident engineer at Kingdom studios (Chicago), which was owned by the Ghana Music Association of Chicago president Dan Boadi. Musicians travelled from all parts of the states to Chicago and recorded with Jay Q. The Ghana musicians association of Chicago (Ghamachi) awarded Jay Q with an honorary member of the association. In 2011, he and a friend Kay Rockks opened an entertainment company called Jay Q Entertainment in Atlanta Georgia (USA) which seeks to nurture artistes in the states and promote events. Jay Q after spending some time in America returned home and bought the hush hush studio and together with the equipment he bought from the states, operates in his Q-Lex studio in Accra.

== Production Discrography ==
- Oluman Boogie - FBS ft. Tinny
- Ahomka Womu - VIP
- Sikletele - 4x4
- Odo Fitaa - 4x4
- Nshornaa - 4x4
- Odo Electric - VIP
- Toffee - Castro
- Boneshaker - Castro ft. Shilo & Skrewface
- Sradinam (Remix) - Castro Ft. Triple M
- African Woman - Kokoveli Ft. Skrewface
- 16 Years - Mzbel ft. Castro
- Yopoo - Mzbel
- I'm in Love - Mzbel ft. Castro
- Obaano - Okumfour Kwaadee ft. Pope Skinny
- Juliana - K2 ft. Bright
- Monkey Chop Banana - Nkasei ft. Bright
- Sanbra - Madfishh Ft. K.K Fosu
- Klublofo (I'm Going to Come) - Buk Bak
- Kakatsofa - Buk Bak
- Bonwire Kente - Ofori Amponsah
- Kwame Ko - Ofori Amponsah
- Agenda - Daddy Lumba
- Angel - Daddy Lumba
- P.O.P - Daddy Lumba
- Okukuseku Nipa Hu Yehu - Daddy Lumba
- Akukor Perming - FBS
- Shine Your Eyes - Obour Ft. Papa Shanti
- Jacket - Praye
- Adwoa - Obour ft. A.B. Crentsil
- Esi - Kontihene Ft. Kwabena Kwabena
- African Woman - Kokoveli Ft. Skrewface
- Jama Oo Jama - Castro, Dr. Poh, Chakua, Kwaku Abebrebe
- Koti - Triple M
- Osei Yei (Ghana 08 Africa Cup Of Nation Theme Song) - Ft Ofori Amponsah, Obrafuor & Samini & Tinny & Obour & Chicago
- Gonja Barracks - Bukbak
- You 4 know - Bukbak
- Komi Ke Kena - Bukba
- Broni - Bukbak
- Yaa Asantewa - Bukbak
- Agyeii – Bukbak Ft. Nkasei
- Na Who Cause Am – Dr. Poh Ft. 2Tee
- Mini - Bukbak
- Wone Me Baby (Remix) - Madfish Ft. Kofi Nti

§

== Personal life ==
As of 2022, Jay Q has a child called Aiden Tennyson who is 10 years old he plays football and loves piano.Jay Q is Christian. His hobbies include golf and watching movies.
