= Bullgod =

Ghanaian musical artist

- Born: Lawrence Nana Asiamah Hanson; Ghana
- Citizenship: Ghanaian
- Occupation: Artiste manager

Lawrence Nana Asiamah Hanson, popularly known as Bullgod, is an artiste manager in Ghana. He was the long-time manager for controversial Ghanaian musician Shatta Wale before they fell out.

== Career ==
Bullgod began his career as a rapper before he became an artiste manager. He is the founder and the Chief executive officer of Bullhaus Entertainment which he registered as an artiste management company in 2003. He has managed Ghanaian artists like 5Five, Nii Soul, Bertha (Yaa Yaa), Natural Face, Iwan, Rudebwoy Ranking, Vanilla, VIP now VVIP. Koo Ntakra and Shatta Wale.

== Change of name ==
In August 2020, he changed his name from 'Bulldog' to 'Bullgod' when his daughter called him 'Bullgod'. He also revealed his previous name 'Bulldog' means 'Bull Depends on God'.

== Controversy ==
He was reportedly arrested for threatening the president of Ghana Nana Akuffo Addo. He was also reported to have said he would never manage a female artist. According to him no matter how a male manager manages female artists they will end up falling in love or end up having sex with her, which is not good for the music business.

== Personal life ==
Bullgod is married to Fiwa Hanson who is based in Germany. They have three children.
