= Appietus =

Ghanaian musician and sound engineer

- Born: Appiah Dankwah; 12 March 1977 (age 49); Accra, Ghana
- Genres: Afro-pop, hi-life, reggae, gospel, dance hall, African traditional, hiplife, azonto
- Occupations: Actor, sound engineer, music producer, musician
- Years active: (1995–present)
- Label: Creative Records

Appiah Dankwah, popularly known as Appietus (born 12 March 1977) is a Ghanaian actor musician, music producer and sound engineer based in Accra, Ghana. The name Appietus gained prominence from his signature "Appietus in the mix". It was, however, coined from the phrase "Appiahs' Tools". He has been the winner of six music industry awards in the 10-year span from the start of his career. He won the Ghana Music Honours 2015 Best Music Producer and Sound Engineer award, Sun Shine Music Awards 2010 Best Sound Engineer award and the UK Ghana Music Awards, Best Sound Engineer in 2008. His remarkable work has also led him to represent the country in some international programs including WOMEX 2013 in Wales, UK, and Worldtronics in Berlin, Germany, 2012.

== Life, career and style ==
=== Early life ===
Born Appiah Dankwah to Osei Poku and Susana Appiah in Accra, but from Aduman in the Ashanti Region, Appietus is married to Freda Appiah Dankwah with four children (Nkunim Appiah Dankwah, Nshira Appiah Dankwah, Enigye Appiah Dankwah and Ayeyi Appiah Dankwah). He attended Ebenezer Secondary School in Dansoman (Class of 1993). At a young age, he was enthused about playing an instrument and used any object he came across to make a noise. His father bought him his first toy piano to nurture his talent. Appietus took the opportunity to learn to play instruments at the Four Square Gospel Church, Mount Olivet Methodist Church and Alive Chapel Intentional and began learning the basics of sound engineering at Fredima Studios Adabraka, Accra, in 1995.

=== Career ===
He continued to grow his expertise and improved his sound engineering qualities from Fredima Studios at Adabraka in Accra. He later moved to Kay's Frequency at Asylum Down where he further enriched his production skills in the year 1998. He also worked at Kampsite Studios at Dansoman SSNIT flats in the year 2003 after graduating from Kay's Frequency. He finally established his own studio (Creative Studioz) at Dansoman Sahara in the year 2006. Creative Studioz started off as a partnership between Amandzeba and Appietus till the contract expired when Appietus took over as CEO till date. His memorable audio signature was later discovered to be the voice of international Hiplife and ghanaian dancehall heavyweight Shatta Wale, formerly known as Bandana.

He has had the opportunity to be on the panel for the Vodafone Icons in 2012 and 2013. He mentored the group that won the 2012 Vodafone Icons and from which an eminent artist Wiyaala has emerged.

In 2014, Appietus collaborated with COPILOT Music and Sound on a cover of Carlinhos Brown's "Maria Caipirnha (Samba da Bahia)". The arrangement represented the musical instrumentation and styles of Ghana for Visa's "Samba of the World", a digital campaign for the 2014 FIFA World Cup.

=== Style ===
Appietus is versatile in his work and has always preferred to give reverence to God on the success of his career. His versatility has been proven in his productions, from the various genres he produces and (or) records. His style has always been to adapt to the flow of what trends, he has recorded several genres of music (Afro-Pop, Hi-Life, Reggae, Gospel, Dance Hall, African Traditional, Hiplife, Azonto), which affirm his ability to easily adjust when the need arises. From his main profession as a sound engineer he has also actualized in some other professions such as singing and acting. He has just released his first single titled "Kuntunimu", which features Castro. He has further led the industry by introducing a reality show ''Appietus Idolz'', that sought to hunt musical talents.

==== Appietus Idolz ====
Appietus Idolz, was the first ever reality show to be organized in Ghana by a sound engineer. The idea was to produce real talents who were capable of making their own music after the competition. The show did not allow participants to sing songs of other eminent artists but rather sing one that they had originally composed to the beats of Apietus. The inspiration for this reality show came from the future of the music industry, as Appietus prospected a few upcoming rappers who needed someone to produce them. Upon various encounters with quite a number who wished that he produced them, he coined the idea to produce the best of all the talents who represented on his reality show. The winner of the show TJ, is currently being produced by Appietus under the label Creative Records.

==== Appietus Compilation ====
The Appietus Compilation is a mix of Ghana's finest music stars on one platform. Appietus collaborates with an array of music stars on a single compilation. The essence of the compilation was for him to put together tunes that will leave endless rhythms in the minds of consumers. He has within a period of seven years (2008–2015) released three compilations: The Revolution, Tip of the Iceberg, and Appietus Compilation Volume 3 (Azonto Fiesta).

== Discography ==
=== Songs Recorded ===
| Artists | Songs Recorded |
|---|---|
| Daddy Lumba | "Tokrom", "Obi Ato Meso Bour Remix", "Mensieda Remix", "Give and Take" |
| Ofori Amponsah | "Otoolege", "Emmanuella", "Owayey" |
| Kwabena Kwabena | "Aso", "Ohemaa Akua Konadu", "Menkoa", "Trodom" |
| Wutah | "Gusiganda", "Sakotosa", "Obayi Wo Ahoufe" |
| Praye | "Shody", "Angelina", "Kakyereno" |
| Sarkodie | "Azonto Fiesta" |
| K.K. Fosu | "Number One", "Obaapa", "Alomo", "6 Oclock", "Anadwo Yede Remix" |
| Rex Omar | "Didadadidida", "Play I" |
| Okyeame Kwame | "Faithful", "Mr. Versatile", "Wo Aniso", "Small Small" |
| Kojo Antwi | "Memmo", "Anansewaa" |
| 4x4 | "Yesi Yesi", "World Trade Center", "Waist & Power" |
| Lucky Mensah | "Onongbor", "Nakai Noorni", "Sweetie Jorli Diana", "Meni Obiaa" |
| George Darko | "Lucky Star" |
| Ebo | "Ones Twice" |
| Sidney | "Scent no", "Abuskeleke" |
| Kofi Nti | "Rakia, "Odo Nwom", "Atwetan", "Monica", "Kae Bo No" |
| Samini | "Gbeke Ke Dark" |
| Obrafour | "Heavy Onie" |
| Castro | "Front & Back", "Mamendowo", "Azonto 360" |
| Bradez | "419", "HipLife Review", "Dondo" |
| Becca | "Forever Remix" |
| Kwaadee | "Kawonan Toso" |
| Kwaw Kese | "I Feel Good", "Kwedo Sa" |
| D2 | "Mama ne Dada", "Ewo", "Never Leave Me" |
| 5Five | "Mujebaya-Move Back", "Bossu Kena", "African Girls" |
| Asaase Abban | "Wope Saa", "Boys Dey Pay" |
| Don Itchii | "Maso Bekete", "Yaayi", "Dundu", "Worrior", "Ohenebiba" |

=== Compilations ===
- 2008:The Revolution
- 2010:Tip of the Iceberg
- 2012:Appietus Compilation Volume 3 (Azonto Fiesta)

=== Single ===
- 2014:Kuntunimu

== Awards and nominations ==
Appietus awards and nominations
Awards and nominations
| Award | Wins | Nominations |
| Ghana Music Awards | 0 | 1 |
| Ghana Music Awards | 1 | 0 |
| Ghana Music Awards | 1 | 0 |
| Ghana Music Awards | 0 | 1 |
| UK Ghana Music Awards | 1 | 0 |
| Ghana Music Awards | 0 | 1 |
| Sun Shine Music Awards | 1 | 0 |
| Ghana Music Awards | 0 | 1 |
| Ghana Music Awards | 0 | 1 |
| Ghana Music Awards | 1 | 0 |
| Ghana Music Honours | 1 | 0 |

Totals (Note: Certain award groups do not simply award one winner. They acknowledge several different recipients, have runners-up, and have third place. Since this is a specific recognition and is different from losing an award, runner-up mentions are considered wins in this award tally. For simplification and to avoid errors, each award in this list has been presumed to have had a prior nomination.)
- Wins: 6
- Nominations: 5

=== Ghana Music Awards ===
| Year | Nominee / work | Award | Result |
|---|---|---|---|
| 2005 | Himself | Best Recording Engineer | Nominated |

=== Ghana Music Awards ===
| Year | Nominee / work | Award | Result |
|---|---|---|---|
| 2006 | Himself | Best Recording Engineer | Won |

=== Ghana Music Awards ===
| Year | Nominee / work | Award | Result |
|---|---|---|---|
| 2007 | Himself | Best Recording Engineer | Won |

=== Ghana Music Awards ===
| Year | Nominee / work | Award | Result |
|---|---|---|---|
| 2008 | Himself | Best Recording Engineer | Nominated |

=== UK Ghana Music Awards ===
| Year | Nominee / work | Award | Result |
|---|---|---|---|
| 2008 | Himself | Best Sound Engineer | Won |

=== Ghana Music Awards ===
| Year | Nominee / work | Award | Result |
|---|---|---|---|
| 2009 | Himself | Best Sound Engineer | Nominated |

=== Ghana Music Awards ===
| Year | Nominee / work | Award | Result |
|---|---|---|---|
| 2010 | Himself | Best Sound Engineer | Nominated |

=== Sun Shine Music Awards ===
| Year | Nominee / work | Award | Result |
|---|---|---|---|
| 2010 | Himself | African Best Sound Engineer | Won |

=== Ghana Music Awards ===
| Year | Nominee / work | Award | Result |
|---|---|---|---|
| 2011 | Himself | Best Music Producer | Nominated |

=== Ghana Music Awards ===
| Year | Nominee / work | Award | Result |
|---|---|---|---|
| 2012 | Himself | Best Music Producer | Won |

=== Ghana Music Honours ===
| Year | Nominee / work | Award | Result |
|---|---|---|---|
| 2015 | Himself | Best Music Producer And Sound Engineer | Won |

== External sources ==
Appietus Facebook Page

Appietus Twitter Page

Appietus Instagram Page

Appietus' interview with DJ Abrantie of Capital Radio

Appietus speaks to DJ Edu of BBC

TJ "Trust Jah"- Dem Try ( Winner Of The Appietus Idolz Season 1 )
