= 16 Years =

Single by Mzbel featuring Castro

from the album 16 Years
- Released: 16 March 2005
- Genre: Highlife
- Length: 5:05
- Label: Mzbel Music
- Songwriters: Ekua Amoah; Theophilus Tagoe
- Producer: Jay Q

Audio sample
- "16 Years": file; help

"16 Years" is a single by Ghanaian musician Mzbel featuring Castro, released on 16 March 2005 through her independent record label Mzbel Music from the record, 16 Years. The song was produced by fellow Ghanaian producer Jay Q. The track depicts a middle-aged man who tries to pursue a sixteen-year-old girl (Mzbel).

Mzbel sings using words from Akan and Pidgin English while switching through unconventional genres at the time (such as Highlife). After the music video for the song was posted onto the site Ghanamusic.com, it quickly became one of the biggest songs of 2005–2006.

== Background ==
In an interview with The Ghanaian Chronicle, Mzbel talks about the backstory behind "16 Years".

I was in a taxi when I came [up] with the lyrics. I use to stay with [a lot] of girls from James Town, so I watched how they talk and the way they behaved. And Maame Dokono was always on radio talking about rape, so we were in a taxi one day and we were listening to Maame Dokono and I was watching how people were reacting to the stories and I came up with the song (16 years).

== Content ==
The title track for Mzbel's breakthrough sophomore album (16 Years) portrays a middle-aged man who decides to pursue a sixteen-year-old girl (Mzbel). It's sung from the girl discovering herself as a sexual being, the track encourages Mzbel's playful exploration of styles of clothing and the public display of her body across the urban landscape of Accra. The man is depicted as a predator.

Mzbel sings in a mixture of Akan and Pidgin English while switching through unconventional genres at the time (such as Highlife). The lyricism reflects on her background growing up in urban Accra.

== Music video ==
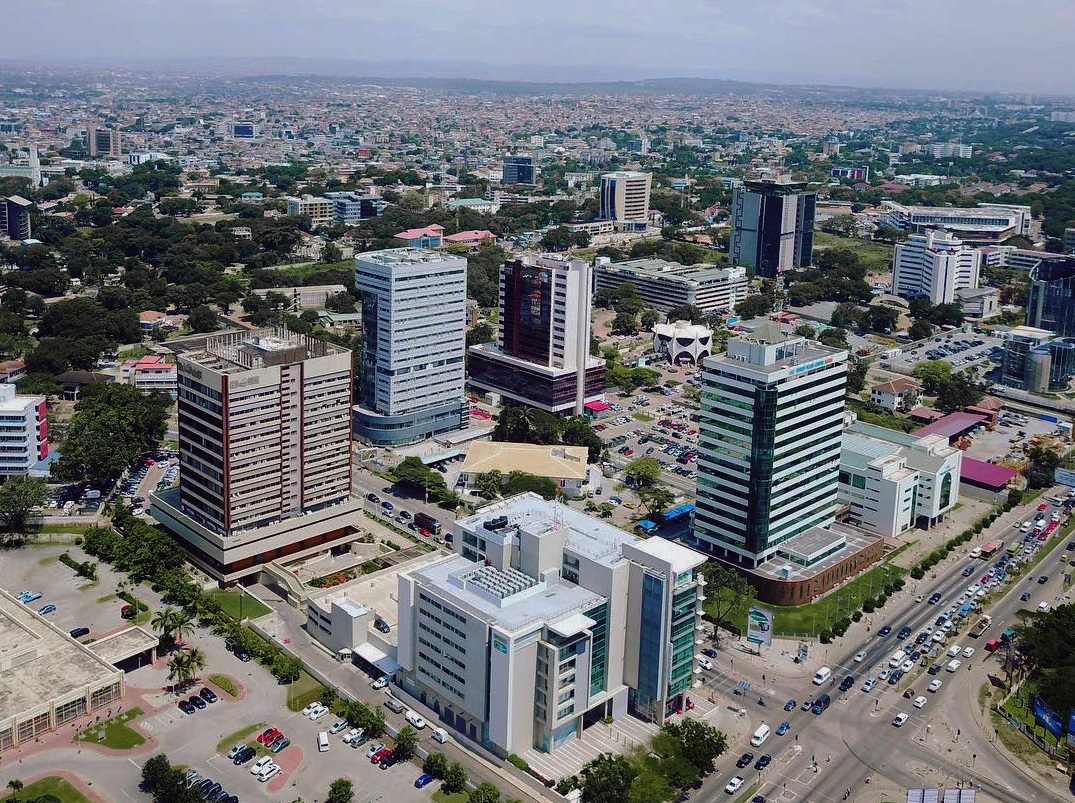
The music video shows the urban landscape of Accra, the capital of Ghana

The music video for "16 Years" begins with Mzbel in her bedroom mirror, applying makeup before putting on a miniskirt and white leather knee-high boots. The camera then cuts to her displaying confidence through the streets of Accra followed by other confident female dancers. All the expensive accessories such as mobile phones, sunglasses, and purses are meant to visualize the modern girl going into adulthood traversing across the urban landscape.

Castro, a male hiplife artist, appears as a cameo on the track. His verse warns men not to be tempted as she is too young. Mzbel is then comically followed by a middle-aged man, who tries to entice her to ride in his new truck along with seducing her. Following this encounter, he is then taken to a law court where Mzbel sings from the stand while the culprit sits helplessly in handcuffs while simultaneously the crowd makes insulting remarks at him and the parents of the young girl point accusingly. However, contrary to the real violence against Mzbel, she was the one being shamed for being morally uncontained. The crowd represented the shaming communal justice of Ghanaian society against taboo actions like intercourse with young girls.

Soon after, the video cuts between two narrative portions: the courtroom trial of the old man and the playful and seemingly unknowing seducing movements of the young girl and her friends around the city of Accra. The girls, in question, are unaware that they are cultivating male interest while being portrayed as having the right to self-expression. This suggests that they are dressing for themselves and not to seduce men, but to the old man, they are deliberately seductive.

== Release ==
The song's music video, soon after release, gathered a lot of attention on television in Ghana. The song started to gain a lot more attention when it was posted on the entertainment site Ghanamusic.com, founded in 2001 and gradually became the premiere online site for content related to Ghanaian music and entertainment at the time. It soon became one of the biggest songs of 2005 through 2006.

=== Impact on Mzbel's career ===
After performing on the Kumasi campus of Kwame Nkrumah University of Science and Technology in celebration of Art Society week at the college, Mzbel was sexually assaulted by a group of audience members after a riot broke out on 1 October 2005 over not getting a re-continuation of her performance. In a radio interview, she defended herself, stating "I cannot be blamed for my own assault." One year later, on 12 September 2006, a group of armed robbers broke into Mzbel's home in New Gbawe (located on the outskirts of Accra) and was once again assaulted, along with one of her dancers, and robbed out of her money and electronic equipment. These attacks builds upon the narrative of "16 Years".

== See also ==
- 2005 in music

== Bibliography ==
- Shipley, Jesse Weaver (2013). "6". Living the Hiplife: Celebrity and Entrepreneurship in Ghanaian Popular Music. Duke University Press. ISBN 9780822395904.
- Wright II, Earl; Toney, Kierra N.; Eason, Keri; Stone Jr., Anthony J. (2022). Sociology and Hip Hop | An Anthology (1st ed.). Cognella. ISBN 9781516587322.
