= Bak Tye =

Ghanaian musician (1980–2019)

- Born: 1980
- Died: 28 July 2019 (aged 38–39); Accra, Ghana
- Occupation: Musician

Ekow Zagla (1980 – 28 July 2019), also known as Bak Tye or Baka Tee, was a Ghanaian hiplife artist and rapper.

== Career ==
He was known for his hit track in 2004 known as Yenpie featuring Samini. In his prime he was featured by Mzbel in her song Awaso Me and Kofi Nti among many others.

== Death ==
He died from a chronic tuberculosis at the Ridge Hospital.
