= Prince Bright =

- Also known as: Bling Sparkle
- Born: Kokomlemle, Ghana

Prince Bright, also known as Bling Sparkles, is a Ghanaian hiplife musician. He is the sole surviving member of the Buk Bak music group after the demise of his partner Ronny Coaches.

== Education ==
Prince started his primary education at Kings College in Kokomlemle, continued to City Secondary Business College before moving to Accra Technical Training Centre in Accra to study Graphics and Design, where he met Ronny.

== Personal life ==
In May 2016, Prince married his longtime girlfriend in a private Ghanaian traditional ceremony in Bronx NY. It was rumored in 2017 that he and former member of VIP Promzy might be teaming up to form a new group.
