= Naana Donkor Arthur =

Media personality, philanthropy and nurse

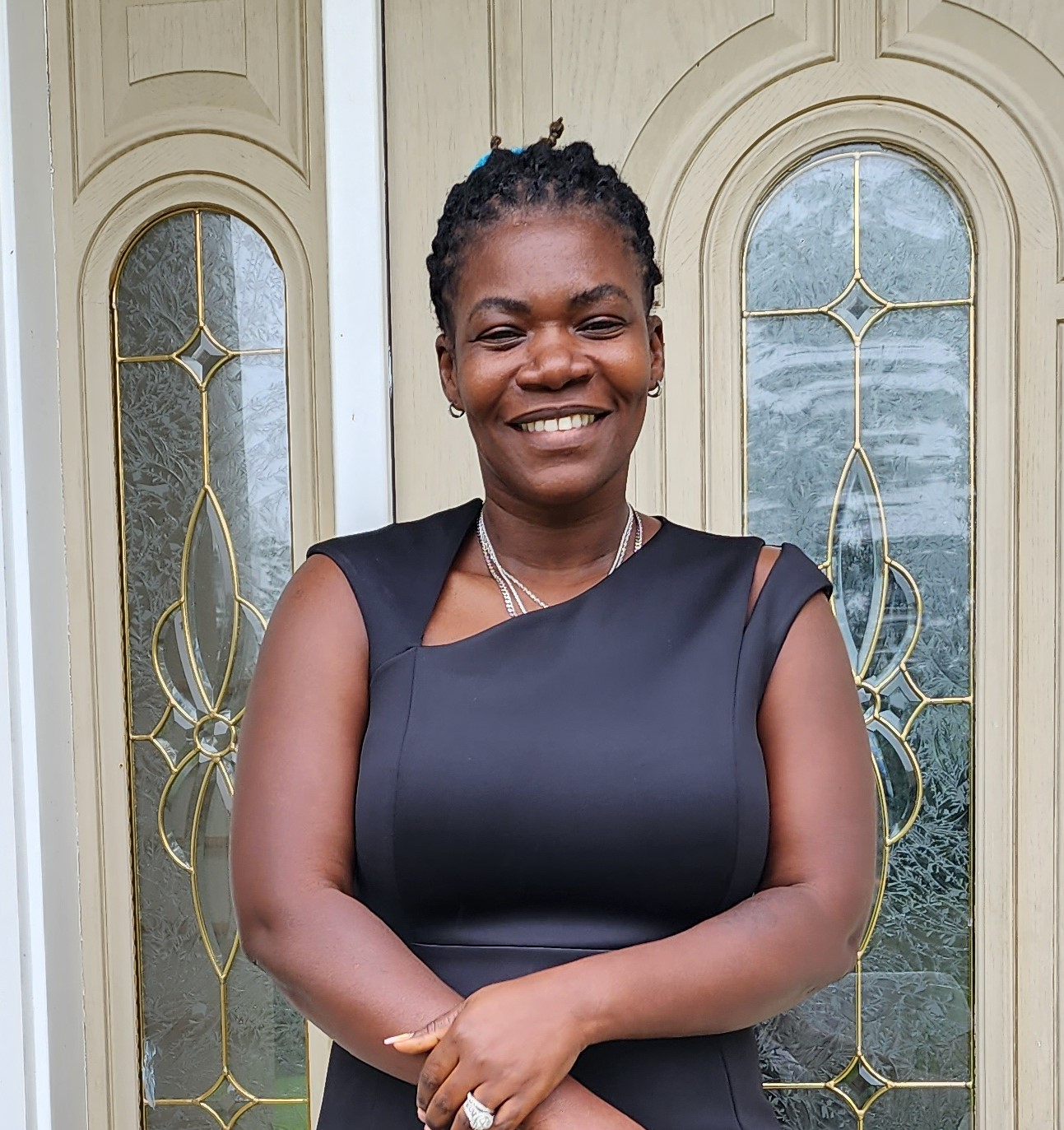
- Born: Naana Donkor Arthur
- Education: Liberty Home Health Training Center, ABC Center
- Occupations: Certified Nurse Assistant, Media Practitioner & Philanthropist

Eunice Naana Arthur (4 November 1981) also known as Naana Donkor Arthur or NDA is a Ghanaian-American philanthropist, health practitioner and a media personality who is host of Live with NDA.

== Early Life & Education ==
Arthur was born in Agona Nyakrom in the Central Region of Ghana. She received her certification at the Liberty Home Health Training Center in 2002 and in 2006, she also acquired a certification as a certified nurse assistant at ABC Center at Fordham.

== Career ==
She is the host of Live with NDA, where she has had Lord Kenya, Fameye, Kwame Eugene, Jakie Appiah, Rose Ngissah and more as guests. She runs a charity called NDA Charity; the charity aids the less fortunate with education, health and shelter.

== Honours ==
- She was honoured at the 3G Media Awards as the top blogger in 2021.
- She was nominated twice for Best Entertainer at the Ghana Entertainment Awards USA, in 2022 and 2023, winning in 2023.

== Awards ==
- She won Best Online Content Creator at Ghana Entertainment Awards USA 2024.
- In 2025 she won content create of the year at the Ghana Entertainment Awards, USA.
