= Nakorex =

- Origin: Ghana
- Genres: Highlife
- Years active: 1992–2015
- Past members: Nat Brew, Rex Omar, and Akosua Agyapong

Nakorex were a Ghanaian Highlife supergroup active in the 1990s. The band was formed in 1992 by the musicians Nat Brew, Rex Omar, and Akosua Agyapong, and took its name from the first few letters of each member's name. Brew and Agyapong were later married. Their musical style combined high-tech and standard instruments, with an emphasis on live performances. The biggest song of the collective was Kpanlogo Yede, which is regarded as a classic Ghanaian song utilizing the kpanlogo drums and rhythms popular in Kpanlogo.

The band split up in 2015, following the divorce of Nat Brew (by then going under the name of "Amandzeba") and Agyapong, the Nat Brew denied that the split up was a result of the divorce. The band reunited to perform at the 2020 Vodafone Ghana Music Awards.
