= Guayo (disambiguation) =

A guayo is a Cuban percussion instrument. It may also refer to:

- A grater, in the Caribbean
- Guayo Cedeño (born 1974), Honduran musician

== Places ==
- Guayo River, Puerto Rico
- Guayo, Adjuntas, Puerto Rico, a barrio in Adjuntas, Puerto Rico
- Guayos, town in Cuba
