= Sony Achiba =

Ghanaian hiplife musician

- Also known as: Sony Achiba
- Born: Emmanuel John Bandick Dankwa; Kumasi
- Origin: Ghana
- Genres: Afro pop, highlife, hip-dia
- Occupations: Musician, Dancer
- Instruments: Keyboards, vocals, bass guitar
- Years active: 2000

Emmanuel John Bandick Dankwa (affectionately known as Sony Achiba, Oseikrom Prince Charles and Indian Man) is a Ghanaian-born Bristish hiplife artist and dancer. He is the first Ghanaian to combine hip hop, hi-life and Indian style of music in Ghana and beyond.

== Early life and education ==
Achiba was born in Kumasi in the Ashanti Region of Ghana to J. B. Danquah and Akia Frema. He had both his primary and secondary education in Kumasi. He attended Kumasi Technical Institute without completing due to financial issues. He also attended Osei Tutu Senior High School. In 2018, he attended the Buckinghamshire New University and graduated in 2022 with a degree in Business Management.

== Career ==
His career began as a dancer after he had an accident on his left leg playing football. He performed with other Ghanaian musicians such as Tommy Wiredu, Frank Mensah Pozo, Rex Omar, George Jahraa, Nana Tuffour, Ama Badu, Randy Noonoo and others. In 2000, he launched his first album. Two years later, Achiba launched another album called HIP-DIA. He is currently a music producer and has signed a new artist called Queen Peezy (Lady Blue).

== Discography ==
=== Albums ===
- Indian Ocean 1 (2001)
- Indian Ocean 2
- Indian Ocean 3

==== Songs ====
- Sony maba
- Nipa Boniayefo (Onipa Boniayefuor)
- Gyamera Woyare
- Ekbar Daraw Bondhu (feat. Ash Boii & Sony Achiba)
- Fufuo
- Wo Ne Medofo

== Hobbies ==
Achiba likes watching movies, making friends and listening to music.

== Allegation ==
Achiba accused Fiifi Banson for 'killing' his music career. Achiba claimed Fiifi Banson spoke ill of his song Wo Ne Medofo live on air which affected his music career negatively. Fiifi Banson later apologized to Achiba.
