= Papi Adabraka =

Ghanaian hiplife artist

- Also known as: Ladies Man, Papi 5Five
- Born: Luther Azameti; Adabraka, Accra
- Occupations: Musician, Rapper

Luther Azameti, known professionally as Papi Adabraka, is a Ghanaian musician, rapper and a former member of music group 5Five.

== Early life and career ==
Papi Adabraka used to go by Papi 5Five, he grew up in Adabraka and started his music career as one half of the music group 5Five in 2005 and then after years of being together he left to start his solo career.

Papi released Location with Mr Drew and Krymi after finally announcing he was going solo.

== Discography ==
=== Singles ===
- Location feat Mr Drew and Krymi
- Akosua Tilapia feat Vanilla
- Boys Taya

== Controversy with Appietus ==
Papi Adabraka and Appietus were engaged in an exchange of words on radio and TV over copyright infringements. Appietus allegedly engaged against Adabraka on their song Move Back (Mujebaya) and a few others.
