= Alex Ofori =

Ghanaian dancer (died 2021)

- Born: Alex Ofori
- Occupation: Dancer

Alex Ofori (died June 2021) was a Ghanaian former dance champion in 1989 and also represented Ghana at the World Dance Championship series at the London Hippodrome.

== Career ==
He was a professional dancer, choreographer and a fashion designer. He won Great Embassy Double Do, and representing Ghana at London, Hippodrome. During his time, he danced with Ghana's best dancers like Gemann, Adjetey Sowah, Slim Buster, Reggie Rockstone, Ebenezer Ako Nai, Terry Ofosu Bright and more.

== Honours ==
He was the Dance Champion of the 1988 Great Embassy Double Do.

== Death ==
The cause of death is unknown.
