= 5Five =

Ghanaian musical group

- Origin: Ghana
- Genres: Hiplife
- Years active: 2005–2015
- Labels: Bullhaus Entertainment, Adabraka Recordz
- Members: Papi 5Five; Killy; Juno

5Five (pronounced "double five") was a Ghanaian hiplife music group. Formed in 2005, the group was composed of Luther Azamati (Papi 5Five), Jeffery Opoku Agyekum (Killy) and Juno.

== Background ==
5Five became a household name in Ghana after their song African Gurlz won two awards at the Ghana Music Awards in 2008. The group was formed in Adabraka, a suburb of Accra. Their debut single, Bull (4 Better 4 Worse), was released in 2005; they later did a remix of it with Batman Samini (now known mononymously as Samini), which was then included in the Appietus compilation.

== Controversy with Appietus ==
Papi 5Five a member of 5Five and Appietus was engaged in an exchange of words on radio and tv over copyright infringements. Appietus has allegedly engaged against 5Five on their song Move Back (Mujebaya) and a few others. Appietus claimed in an interview on Citi TV that he wasn't paid hence allowing his DSPs to upload the song on music streaming websites on his behalf. Lawrence Nana Asiamah Hanson who owns Bullhaus Entertainment is also involved in this controversy and threatened court action against Appietus. Appietus also threatened to take court action against Papi 5Five for allegedly defaming him.

== Disbandment ==
Papi Adabraka was the first member of 5Five to go solo in 2022 after he claimed they had a challenge that they were able to resolve. But after doing that they all had to go their separate ways since none of others where interested in pursuing music further. Killy on the other hand has rebranded his name and is now known as Quasi Flava.

== Discography ==
=== Albums ===
- Move Back

=== Singles ===
- African Gurlz
- Move Back (Mujebaya) feat Appietus
- Number One Fan
- Pretty Girl
- Gargantuan Body
- Bossu Kena
- Lamiorkor
- Shorty
- Tinkolon
- Uhm Ahh
- Party

== Awards and nominations ==
Ghana Music Awards (VGMAs)
Year	Award	Details	Result	Ref
2008	Pop Song of the Year	"African Gurlz"	Won	
2008	Discovery of the Year	"African Gurlz"	Won	
