= VVIP (hip-hop group) =

Ghanaian hiplife music group

- Origin: Nima, Accra, Ghana
- Genres: Hip-hop, Hiplife
- Years active: 1997–present
- Labels: Goodies Music Productions (former), Vision Music Group
- Members: Zeal (formerly Lazzy); Prodigal; Reggie Rockstone
- Past members: Bone; Chicago; Friction; Promzy

VVIP, formerly known as VIP (Vision In Progress) is a Ghanaian Hiplife music group made up of Zeal, formerly known as Lazzy (Abdul Hamid Ibrahim), Prodigal (Joseph Nana Ofori) and Reggie Rockstone (Reginald Ossei) from Nima a suburb in Accra, Ghana

== Formation ==
The founder of this group is actually Friction (Musah Haruna) who formed this group with a friend of his who later had to leave the group for the U.S. to finish his education. So Friction proposed the idea to four people (Promzy, Lazzy, Prodigal, Bone-later left the group) and before they knew it, the five of them were performing at ghetto parties, clubs, street festivals etc.

Friction's dog, Chicago, was also an official member of the group. You could hear the dog growling at the end of their tracks from the late 1990s. Eventually Chicago died.

== Albums ==
In 1997, VIP presented at a street carnival. It was then that a Ghanaian television-presenter, Blakofe (aka Akua Manfo) and a radio-presenter called Michael Smith discovered the group. Blakofe became their manager, and Michael Smith gave them a contract by the name, Precise Music. In 1998, they released their first album, Bibi Baa O, they were famous all over Accra. They became the most popular Hiplife group in Ghana. In 2000, they released their second album, Ye De Aba, which was more successful than their first album. After the second album, Friction felt that it was his time to work as an individual artist and quit the group. The group now had three members (Promzy, Prodigal and Lazzy) and released a third album in 2001 called Lumbe Lumbe Lumbe with the smashing hit "Daben na Odo Beba". However the hip life group conquered the Ghana music charts with their 2003 album Ahomka Womu; their single also named "Ahomka Womu" was number one on the Ghanaian charts for over 20 weeks. VIP won five awards at the Ghana Music Awards from the hit single and the group gained international exposure after this success. Since then, the group has been touring worldwide. They are now among the most famous artists in Ghana. Promzy then later left the group to work as a solo artist but according to him he says he did not break out of the group

Following the exit of Promzy, Reggie Rockstone, known as the godfather of Ghanaian rap who back in the mid-1990s christened the new genre Hiplife, joined the group. The new group's name metamorphosed to VVIP and they have since produced smash singles like "Selfie", "Skolom" and "Dogoyaro".

== Documentary ==
VIP have launched their 110-minute documentary, Home Grown:Hiplife in Ghana; produced and directed by the American independent filmmaker, Eli Jacobs-Fantauzzi. Some artists present at the launching were Reggie Rockstone, Hashim, Tinny, Sidney, Tic Tac, Mzbel, Rab Bakari, Faze of Nigeria and other artists from Africa and the Caribbean. And to celebrate the release of Home Grown, BDNP (Boogie Down Nima Productions) is set to travel a worldwide release tour of the film in several countries including Brazil, UK, India, South Africa, Nigeria, Canada, Italy, Norway, Jamaica, and the United States.

== Awards ==
Year	Nominee / work	Award	Result
1997	vip	Best Album Cover - African Hip Hop.Com(Europe)	Won
2004	vip	Hip-life Song Of The Year - Ahomka Wo Mu (Ghana Music Awards)	Won
2004	vip	Hip-life Album Of The Year - Ahomka Wo Mu (Ghana Music Awards)	Won
2004	vip	Song Of The Year - Ahomka Wo Mu (Ghana Music Awards)	Won
2004	vip	2004- Artiste Of The Year (Ghana Music Awards)	Won
2004	vip	Hip-life Artiste Of The Year (Ghana Music Awards)	Won
2004	vip	2004- Best album of the year - Ghana Music Awards (UK)	Won
2005	vip	Best African Group -Channel O (South Africa)	Won
2005	vip	Most Popular Artiste of the Year (Nigeria Music Awards)	Won
2005	vip	Youth Excellency Awards (Ghana)	Won
2006	vip	Achievement Award for community service (Ghana)	Won
2010	vip	Best group video -4syte Music Awards (Ghana)	Won
2010	vip	Best hiplife video -4syte Music Awards (Ghana)	Won
2010	vip	Artiste of the year at the City People Awards (Nigeria)	Won
2011	vip	2011-Best hiplife Artiste of the year – Ghana Music Awards	Won
2012	vvip	Best choreography of the year 4syte Music Awards (Ghana)	Won
2014	vvip	Best choreography of the year 4syte Music Awards (Ghana)	Won
2014	VVIP	Best collaboration choreography of the year 4syte Music Awards (Ghana)	Won
2014	vvip	Best collaboration choreography of the year Ghana Music Awards (Ghana)	Won
2015	vvip	Best group of the year (Ghana Music Awards)	Won
2015	vvip	Best group of year (GEA)	Won
2016	vvip	Best group of the year (AFRIMA - All Africa Music Awards)	Won
2016	vvip	Best group video of the year (AFRIMA - All Africa Music Awards)	Won

== Notable concerts ==
- 2003- "Hip-Life Explosion" Tour (London, Amsterdam, Sweden, Denhaag)
- 2004- Back Stars (GH National Football team) Fundraiser show for the OlympicGames in Athens (Greece)
- 2004- "Peace and Reconciliation Concerts" organized by the United Nations and Liberian Government.
- 2005- "Thank you" concerts were also organized by United Nations and the Government of Sierra Leone
- 2006- "Hip-Life Invasion" Tour (The USA from New York to Los Angeles)
- 2008–present Home Grown Hiplife Documentary Tour World
