= Osebo The Zaraman =

Ghanaian businessman and philanthropist

- Born: Seth Appiah Richard Brown
- Other names: Osebo
- Occupations: Businessman, Brand Influencer, Stylist
- Years active: 1998 - present
- Awards: Best Style Man and Fashion Influenza of the Year at the Ghana Style Awards 2021

Seth Appiah Richard Brown (Born 1 January), known as Osebo The Zaraman, is a Ghanaian businessman, fashion influencer and philanthropist. He is the CEO of 24/7 Boutique, and is known for his dressing style in Ghana and abroad, and for his charity work. He has styled most Ghanaian and Nigerian celebrities including Jim Iyke., Prince David Osei, Mr Drew, Joey B, Kumi Guitar, Prince Bright of Buk Bak, Andy Dosty.

== Early life ==
Seth Appiah Richard Brown was born in Suhum in the Eastern Region of Ghana on 1 January to Sampson Appiah and Mary Appiah. He is the firstborn and has five siblings. After his Form Four level, he dropped out of school to work to care for his siblings. Through his work, he met an elderly man who gifted him a Togolese passport, which allowed him to travel to Italy in 1994 where his fashion business began in 1998.

== Career ==
Brown moved to Ghana in 1998 to establish a recording studio Play Station 24/7, and later opened a 24/7 luxury boutique. His dress style included the wearing of a kilt, which he had adopted from Spain. He opened the fashion business Osebo Shoes and Clothing. In 2023 he was the host of Comedian DKB's Comedy Express. In 2021 he was awarded "Best Style Man" and "Fashion Influenza of the Year" at the first edition of the Ghana Style Awards.
