= Tic (musician) =

Ghanaian hiplife musician

TiC
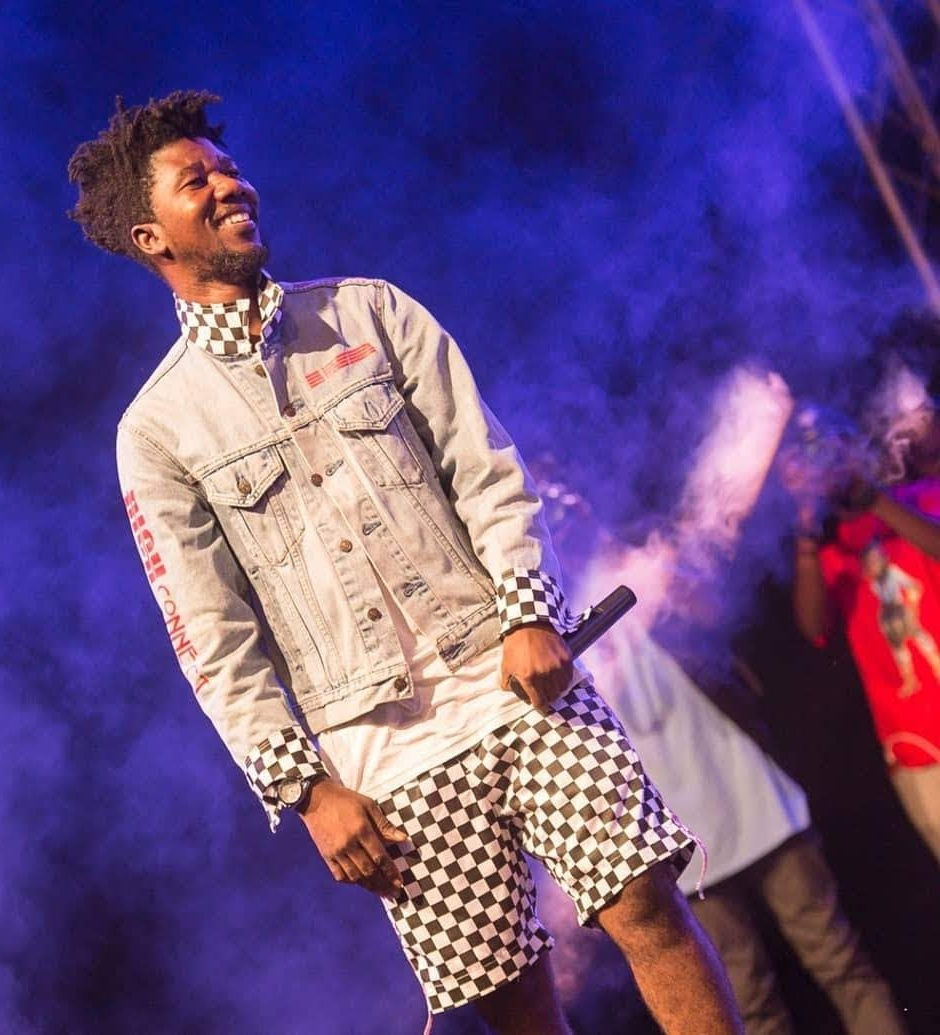
- TiC performing at Presec at 80 Mega Concert

Background information
- Born: Nana Kwaku Okyere Duah; 1980 (age 44–45); Ashanti Region, Ghana
- Origin: Ghana
- Genres: Hiplife
- Occupations: Rapper
- Instrument(s): vocals, local
- Years active: 1995–present
- Labels: TNR Muuic

Nana Kwaku Okyere Duah popularly known as TiC and formerly Tic Tac is a hiplife musician originally from Kwamo, a suburb in the Ashanti Region in Ghana.

== Early life and career ==
He first began performing in 1997 with a group called 'Natty Strangers' along with his best friend Bessem Bikhazi (famously known as Cold Sweat). After becoming the most eagerly awaited group in Ghana, winning awards at events such as Kidafest, Fun World, Source etc., TiC later went on to release a self-produced album after Bessem migrated to the UK to train as a Commercial Pilot. During his early career, TiC modeled his style after his idol Busta Rhymes. Bessem Bikhazi, now a fully qualified pilot, is currently managing TiC.

TiC reached a wider audience when he was featured on Azigiza's song "Woye Bia", which was a hit in Ghana. Collaborations with Slim Busterr and Daasebre Gyamenah followed. In 1999 TiC released his debut solo album, Philomena, which spawned several hits.

"Menka Bio (Shordy)", a single from TiC's third album, Masem, topped the Ghana music chart for 22 consecutive weeks in 2002–2003, which was a record at the time. The launch of his fourth album, Wope, was one of the largest ever in Ghana. Wope was groundbreaking for the hiplife genre in that it featured several major international stars, including Freddy Meiway from Côte d'Ivoire on the title track and Tony Tetuila of Nigeria on "Fefe n'efe", which sampled Fela Kuti. His fifth album, Accra Connection, featured collaborations with Sway DaSafo, Rhian Benson, D'Banj, and JJC. in 2018, TiC dropped a new single named Kwani Kwani (Part 2) featuring a Ghanaian musician Kuami Eugene.

TiC has performed internationally, alongside artists such as 50 Cent, Lloyd Banks, Kanda Bongo Man, and Buju Banton. He is known for hit single Kwani Kwani (Remix) featuring Kuami Eugene.

== "Kangaroo" ==
The video for TiC's 2006 single "Kangaroo" was directed by Gil Green and reached the top of the MTV Base Africa charts.

During the 2008 Africa Cup of Nations, the Ghana national football team began using the song, with its accompanying dance, to celebrate goals.

== Personal life ==
TiC is married to Awurabena Serwaa Duah.

== Awards and recognition ==
TiC has been the recipient of eleven Ghana Music Awards, including Musician of the Year in 2004. At the 2005 Ghana Music Awards, he had a record nine nominations. He co-wrote "Gbese" performed by Wizkid.

== Videography ==
Year	Title	Director	Ref
2019	Kwani Kwani Pt2	5teven Films	

== Humanitarian work ==
TiC was involved in a campaign with the United Nations in Sierra Leone and Ghana alongside Ramsey Nouah and Ozwald Boateng, as part of the WFP raising funds for children.

He was the vice chairman of the Greater Accra region of Musiga, and is constantly involved in numerous campaigns with Musiga to educate and unite the musicians of Ghana.
