= Raglife =

Ghanaian musical genre

- Stylistic origins: Hiplife; Ghanaian hip hop; highlife; reggae; dancehall
- Cultural origins: , Ghana

Raglife is a Ghanaian musical genre that is a combination of hiplife, Ghanaian hip hop and highlife, with reggae. The music uses traditional reggae elements like drum beats and melodies along with rap. The genre is thought to have been created by Abrewa Nana, the first popular female rap artist in Ghana.

A few Ghanaian raglife artists include 4nky Boy, Waxy Buky, Stonebwoy, and Samini. Raglife can be described as dancehall music and often differs from Highlife music due to this distinction. It uses quick drum beats and traditional reggae instruments and melodies to keep the crowd moving. Many songs are performed in English.

Ghanaian raglife has not grown as popular as Hiplife in the last decade. This could be due to the Ghanaian people's general lack of interest in reggae beats and its slight deviation from popular Hiplife music.

In 2013 the Bass Awards were launched in Accra, Ghana. These awards seek to honor Ghanaian and African Reggae and Dancehall music. Overall the award show was successful and has continued annually since its launch.
