= 4x4 (band) =

Ghanaian musical group

- Origin: Ghana
- Genres: Hiplife
- Years active: 2000–present
- Label: X4 Records
- Members: Captain Planet; Coded (formerly Abortion); Fresh Prince

4x4 is a Ghanaian hip hop musical group formed in 2000 by Captain Planet (Sylvanus Dodji Jeoffrey) and Coded, formerly Abortion (Russell Edem Avornyo) with the help of Ronnie Coaches and Bright Bling Sparkles (Buk Bak). They are reputed to have brought crunk to Ghana. In 2007, Captain Planet and Abortion were joined by a new artist named Fresh Prince (Prince Tamakloe).

== Background ==
=== Early career ===
Jeoffry and Avornyo were discovered by Buk Bak as participants in the Kiddafest TV programme showcasing young musical talent. The name 4x4 reflects the four people who led to the creation of the group (Ronnie, Bright, Abortion, and Captain Planet). The duo released their debut album Siklitele under Buk Bak in 2003. In 2009 4X4 Featured Prince Tamkole (Fresh Prince) in a record call "HotGirls.com. Later that year he was admitted to that group.

=== Contestant #1 ===
4x4 released their second album Contestant No. 1 in 2007, with the single "HotGirls.com" featuring a new artist, Fresh Prince (Prince Tamakloe). The song is reputed to have introduced crunk to Ghanaian culture, and earned the group a Ghana Music Award nomination in 2008. "HotGirls.com" was a success, and Fresh Prince eventually joined the band.

=== World Trade Centre ===
In 2009, 4x4 released another album World Trade Center. which went platinum. The title song went to number one on the singles chart in Ghana and is the first and currently only Ghanaian song to make the Urban Charts in Africa. The single "Waist and Power" has also received over 600,000 hits on YouTube.

== Musical style and influences ==
Captain Planet claims to have pioneered Ghanaian vernacular rap, using Akuapem Twi rap, Ga, Ewe, and Pidgin English. Abortion contributes a ragga or dancehall style, which fuses singjaying and deejaying with Captain Planet's rapping to create an innovative form of hip life. The group was and continues to be mentored by Ronnie Coches and Bright Bling Sparkles (Buk Bak).

== Discography ==
=== Albums ===
- Siklitele, 4x4, 2003
- Contestant No. 1, 4x4, 2007
- World Trade Center, Paradise Entertainment, 2009

=== Singles ===
- "HotGirls.com" (2007)
- "World Trade Center" (2008)
- "Waist and Power"

== Awards ==
Ghana Music Awards (VGMAs)
Year	Award	Details	Result
2008	Pop Song of the Year	"Hot Girls dot com"	Nominated
2010	Afro Pop Song of the Year	"World Trade Center"	Won
2011	Afro Pop Song Of The Year	"Miss Doctor"	Nominated
2012	Artiste of the Year		Nominated
2012	Hiplife/Hip Hop Artiste of the Year		Nominated
2012	Hiplife Song of the Year	"Yesi Yesii"	Nominated
2012	Best Group of the Year		Won
2012	Album of the Year	Waist and Power	Won
2012	Hiplife Song of the Year	"Yesi Yesii" (Director: Phamous Philms)	Nominated
