= Copilot Music and Sound =

American music production company

Copilot Music and Sound LLC (commonly known as Copilot Strategic Music + Sound, Copilot Music, or Copilot) is a New York-based music content and strategy company launched in 2008 by partners Jason Menkes and Ravi Krishnaswami. Copilot provides music production, music composition, music licensing, sonic branding, sound design, and creative consultation services throughout the television, gaming, film, advertising, and interactive industries.

== Notable works ==
=== Dishonored "Drunken Whaler" ===
To promote Bethesda Softworks and Arkane Studios' 2012 release of the stealth action-adventure video game Dishonored, Copilot produced an arrangement of the public domain song "Drunken Sailor" for the game's trailer, entitled "Drunken Whaler".

The track's vocal composition included child actors, adult singers who could imitate children, and children of family and friends. The instrumentation used included violins, detuned and distorted guitars, and a "whaler stomp" created by stomping on wooden boards to create a pulsating percussion sound.

Due to the popularity of the track among video game fans, Bethesda commissioned Copilot to create a full-length version of the song which was offered as a free download on the publisher's website. In September 2012, Bethesda hosted a remix contest of "Drunken Whaler", providing Copilot's stems of the individual tracks for fans to create their own arrangements. The creative team at Copilot were invited to review and judge all of the entries.

The 2012 Video Game Awards, broadcast on Spike TV, included "Drunken Whaler" in a live orchestral tribute to the Game of the Year nominees, led by Assassin's Creed III composer Lorne Balfe. "Drunken Whaler" was the only section of the medley to feature music from a game's marketing campaign, rather than its in-game score.

=== Dishonored 2 "Gold Dust Woman" ===
Copilot's original arrangement of Fleetwood Mac's "Gold Dust Woman" accompanied the Dishonored 2 gameplay trailer at the 2016 E3 gaming expo in Los Angeles.

=== Fallout 4 ===
Copilot worked with Bethesda Softworks to write a theme song for Nuka world, in the "Nuka World" Downloadable Content scenario.

=== Fallout 76 ===
Copilot worked with Bethesda Softworks to create a cover of John Denver's hit single "Take Me Home, Country Roads" for the trailer of their upcoming game Fallout 76. The lead vocals of the song were performed by Scout Ford of New York-based a capella group Spank, and officially released on iTunes on July 4, 2018, with all proceeds going to Habitat for Humanity. The song reached No. 1 on the iTunes singles chart, No. 41 on the Billboard Hot Country Songs chart and No. 21 on Billboard Country Digital Songs chart.

=== Visa "Samba of the World" ===
In 2014 Copilot was commissioned to oversee music production on Visa's "Samba of the World", a digital campaign for the 2014 FIFA World Cup. Made in collaboration with AKQA, this interactive music video experience allowed fans to listen and watch 32 different musical arrangements and films, based on 32 different countries, in real time.

Each of the 32 competing countries in the World Cup were represented by an arrangement of Carlinhos Brown's 2005 hit single "Maria Caipirnha (Samba da Bahia)" and adapted in collaboration with local composers, bands, and musicians.

Copilot's initial research focused on the ethnomusicology of each country, detailing both the local popular musical genres in 2014, as well as the historical folk instrumentation unique to its citizens. After determining a tempo that could be applied across the different genres, a shared structure and musical key was given to all creators and collaborators upon which they could develop the unique sounds of their countries.

==== Copilot's collaborators ====
Country	Collaborator
Algeria	Akim El Sikameya
Argentina	Didi Gutman
Belgium	BLEU NUIT - Benoît Pirson
Bosnia and Herzegovina	Zana Messia & DJ Ray Mack
Brazil	Satellite Audio
Cameroon	Sally Nyolo
Chile	James H. Frazier
Colombia	Palenke Soultribe
Costa Rica	Ojo de Buey
Cote D'Ivoire (Ivory Coast)	Denis D. Lactif
Croatia	Davor Hercog
Ecuador	Lamine Fellah
England	Olly Bridgewater
France	TA-DAH STUDIOS
Germany	Metatechnik
Ghana	Appietus
Greece	Mike Stoupakis
Honduras	Ivan Duran and Guayo Cedeño
Iran	Mona Kayhan
Italy	JoyCut
Japan	Kenji Ichiyanagi
Korea	Wen-Kai Ying, Kyle Kim, Tom Jessop
Mexico	Gustavo Naranjo
Netherlands	Freshbeat featuring Onearmed
Nigeria	Pheelz
Portugal	Diabo na Cruz
Russia	Ellina Graypel
Spain	BanjoMusic Studio
Switzerland	Brian Bendahan
Uruguay	Martin Fuks
U.S.A	John Beltran

Visa also commissioned 32 local filmmakers to craft films alongside the musical arrangements that showcased regional dance moves, food enjoyed by fans, the type of gear they wear, and their country's football rituals and history. Copilot collaborated with director Saman Kesh (who served as overseeing advisor to each country's filmmaker) in order to assure the music and visuals worked hand-in-hand.

The interactive website allowed users to click on each of the flag of any competing country to jump to that nation's musical arrangement and film without losing the groove of the song.

=== Wolfenstein: The New Order ===
A large part of the marketing campaign for Bethesda Softworks' 2014 release for Wolfenstein: The New Order focused on 1960s pop music to describe the video game's alternate history in which Germany had won World War II and ruled the world.

Bethesda, AKQA and Copilot invented a fictional state-owned German record label, Neumond Recording Company. The label promoted 10 fictional German pop artists all corresponding with specific pop music genres from the 1960s. Each artist was given a full biographical backstory and their singles were packaged with photographed and designed album cover artwork.

==== Production ====
Given the sensitive nature of the game's subject matter, the songs were initially written in English, to make sure lyrics reflected Wolfenstein's alternate history without creating content that could be used for actual propaganda outside of the game. Furthermore, Copilot intentionally sought out a diverse, multi-cultural talent pool to perform the songs. Jason Menkes said in a Wall Street Journal article "I hired as many non-Aryans as I could for this project. A lot of our artists were Jewish or black or gay." Among their collaborators were The Voice contestant Rino Galiano, and Hypnotic Brass Ensemble

==== Songs ====
Three existing 1960s pop songs were re-arranged in styles appropriate to the game setting, with lyrics translated into German. "House of the Rising Sun" was reinterpreted as a Bavarian waltz, with accordion, clarinets, and brass band. The lyric "there Is a house In New Orleans" was changed to "There is a house in New Berlin". "Nowhere To Run", originally by Martha & The Vandellas was given a more sinister mood with minor chords and machine gun sound effects. In contrast, the original John Lee Hooker blues hit "Boom Boom" was recreated in the style of Schlager, a simple, sanitized popular German musical genre that emerged after World War II, in part as a backlash against American rock'n'roll. The three cover songs were used in trailers for Wolfenstein: The New Order.

Seven original songs were written for the label, each inspired by a different genre of 1960s pop music, but with lyrics that reflected the Wolfenstein universe.

The Comet Tails are a fictional surf rock band. To reflect the Wolfenstein alternate history in which the Nazi's have colonized the moon, Copilot wrote a song called "Weltraum Surfen" (or "Outer Space Surfing").

"Toe The Line" was written in the style of rebellious rock groups like The Rolling Stones and The Kinks, with propagandizing lyrics about how cool is it to follow the rules. The fictional band for "Toe The Line", The Bunkers, was inspired by British artists such as The Beatles and Dusty Springfield who recorded German versions of their hits. Unlike the other Neumond recordings that were sung by talent in Germany and Austria, Copilot worked with an English singer and taught him the German lyrics phonetically. In the Wolfenstein universe, English is a dying language, so Copilot intentionally kept the singer's mispronunciations to infer that the British band was being forced to sing in a language they do not understand.

"Ich Bin Überall" (or "I Am Everywhere") by the fictional group Schwarz Rote Wellen was written the psychedelic rock style. As an artist under a (fictional) state-owned record label, songs about drug-use would be banned. Rather, the experimental lyrics in "Ich Bin Überall" reference Nazi association with occultism, with poetic, abstract descriptions of the game's large mecha guard robots as "the animal with the red eye" and "the seeing eye of the steel guardian is watching your every move".

Victor & The Vokalitsen are a fictional vocal pop group inspired by artists like Jay & The Americans, The Four Seasons, and Tommy James & The Shondells. The song, "Berlin Boys & Stuttgart Girls" was played on Iggy Pop's weekly broadcast for BBC radio. During the radio special, Pop promoted the song as an obscure single from the 1960s, with no reference to it being from a fictional band or from a video game.

==== Usage ====
The Neumond songs were featured in trailers for the game, and could be heard throughout the game as source music. They also could all be obtained as in-game mission-specific collectables to be played later.

A website was published dedicated to the fictitious record label, and a promotional film was produced in the style of K-Tel International's late-night infomercials.

At PAX East in Boston, Bethesda's promotional event for Wolfenstein: The New Order was presented as a Neumond Records release party. Physical 7-inch 45-rpm vinyl singles were given out to attendees, and Copilot's songs and covers were performed live by a group of local musicians led by Emeen Zarookian of the Boston band, Spirit Kid.

Bethesda also created a limited edition LP called "Wolfenstein Neumond Classics: Superhits of the 1960s", featuring of Copilot's productions. A limited run of 500 albums on 140g red vinyl was sold through the Bethesda store.

=== World Wildlife Fund ===
In 2013, Copilot contributed an original song called "Together" to the World Wildlife Fund's first iPad app, "WWF Together". The app was downloaded more than 300,000 times in the first week of release and over 1 million times in over 140 countries during 2013. WWF Together was the winner of a 2013 Apple Design Award, was named Best of Show at the DC ADDY Awards and Creativity International Awards, and was featured in Apple's "10 of Apps that Wow" and "Great Free Apps" list.

A second song, "Underneath the Wild Blue Light", was commissioned to accompany the launch of World Wildlife Fund's eBook app for iPad, WWF Explore in 2015. A third song, "Endangered" written by Copilot partner Ravi Krishnawami under the name "Hybird" and was included in a 3-song EP released in the same year.

In 2016, WWF Together was updated as part of Apple's "Apps for Earth" initiative, and Copilot's music was also used in a behind-the-scenes video featured in the Washington Post.

== Accolades ==
Work	Award	Category	Result
Jell-O	2016 Association of Music Producers Awards	Execution of a Sonic ID or Logo	Won
Samba of the World	2015 Cannes Lions	Song Arrangement	Shortlisted
Samba of the World	2015 Cannes Lions	Cyber/ Web Campaign	Shortlisted
Samba of the World	2015 AICP NEXT Awards	Best Integrated Campaign	Shortlisted
Samba of the World	2015 London International Awards	Song Arrangement	Shortlisted
Samba of the World	2015 Association of Music Producers Awards	Most Effective Use of Music in a Non-Broadcast Medium	Won
Wolfenstein - New Order: Announcement Trailer	2014 Association of Music Producers Awards	Best Use of Music in a Film or Game Trailer	Won
Wolfenstein - New Order: Announcement Trailer	2014 CLIO Key Art Awards	Music in a Game Trailer	Gold
Wolfenstein - New Order: Announcement Trailer	2014 Game Marketing Summit	Outstanding Promotional Trailer	Bronze
Dishonored Gameplay Trailer	2013 Association of Music Producers Awards	Best Use of Music in a Film or Game Promo	Won
Dishonored Gameplay Trailer	2013 AICP Show: The Art & Technique of the American Commercial	Musical Arrangement	Shortlisted
Dishonored Gameplay Trailer	2013 Game Marketing Summit Awards	Best Use of Music in a Promo	Bronze
Dishonored Gameplay Trailer	2013 CLIO Key Art Awards	Audio/Visual Technique	Bronze
Dishonored Gameplay Trailer	2012 London International Awards	Music Adaptation	Shortlisted
Dishonored Gameplay Trailer	Machinima Inside Gaming Awards	Best Trailer Award	Won
World Wildlife Fund	2013 DC Ad Club Awards	Best in Show	Won
Vena Cava	2011 AICP Show: The Art & Technique of the American Commercial	Sound Design	Shortlisted
