= Makaa Maka =

Makaa Maka!!

Studio album by Reggie Rockstone
- Released: 1 September 1997
- Genre: Hiplife; Hip Hop
- Length: 55:25
- Label: Kassa Records
- Producer: Rab Bakari; Zapp Mallet

Reggie Rockstone chronology
Tsoo Boi (1996)	Makaa Maka!! (1997)	Me Na Me Kae (1999)

Makaa Maka!! (I said it because I said it) is the debut studio album by Ghanaian rapper Reggie Rockstone, released on 1 September 1997 through his independent label, Kassa Records. It features guest appearances from Cy Lover, Sammi B, Chocolate, Kwa-Cee, Zapp Mallet, Fredi Funkstone, Nananom, and Talking Drums. It is one of the first rapped hiplife albums to be composed and sung entirety in a Ghanaian language (Twi).

The album comes after his debut EP Tsoo Boi, which came out in 1996. Makaa Maka!! fuses Western-influenced hip hop with traditional Ghanaian hiplife sounds, with some of the songs in the album cross-referencing older highlife songs. Notable tracks of the album included "Sweetie, Sweetie", "Tsoo Boi", "Nightlife in Accra", and "Agoo". The album is co-produced by Rab Bakari and Zapp Mallet.

Makaa Maka!! is one of the best selling albums in Ghana, having sold over 50,000 copies. The album reshaped Ghanaian popular music, resulting in Reggie Rockstone earning the title of "Grandpapa of Hip Life".

== Background ==
During Rockstone's early years, he frequently travelled between the cities of Accra, New York, and London. As a performer and trained actor, he gain fame in 1992-93 through being a member of PLZ, which was one of the top rap groups from London at the time and it included members such as Fredi Funkstone, Jay, and DJ Pogo.

Sydney, a hip hop artist featured in the film Living the Hip Life, goes in detail about how Reggie Rockstone came up with the album.

From 1990, we had groups like Nitty Fan Club (NFL), we had groups like Talking Drums, we had groups like Sly Lover, and we had General Marcus, Black Prophet. You know these were all rap artists. It was 1994, that is when Reggie came down, there was this big Panafest in 1994 and Reggie was like, let's do this in [my] own language, man. So he came out with his first album and we listened to some of the lyrics and it was so amazing and for a moment, I thought he was rapping in English and it was cheap and he said this was a revolution and so let's do it.

== Lyricism and production ==
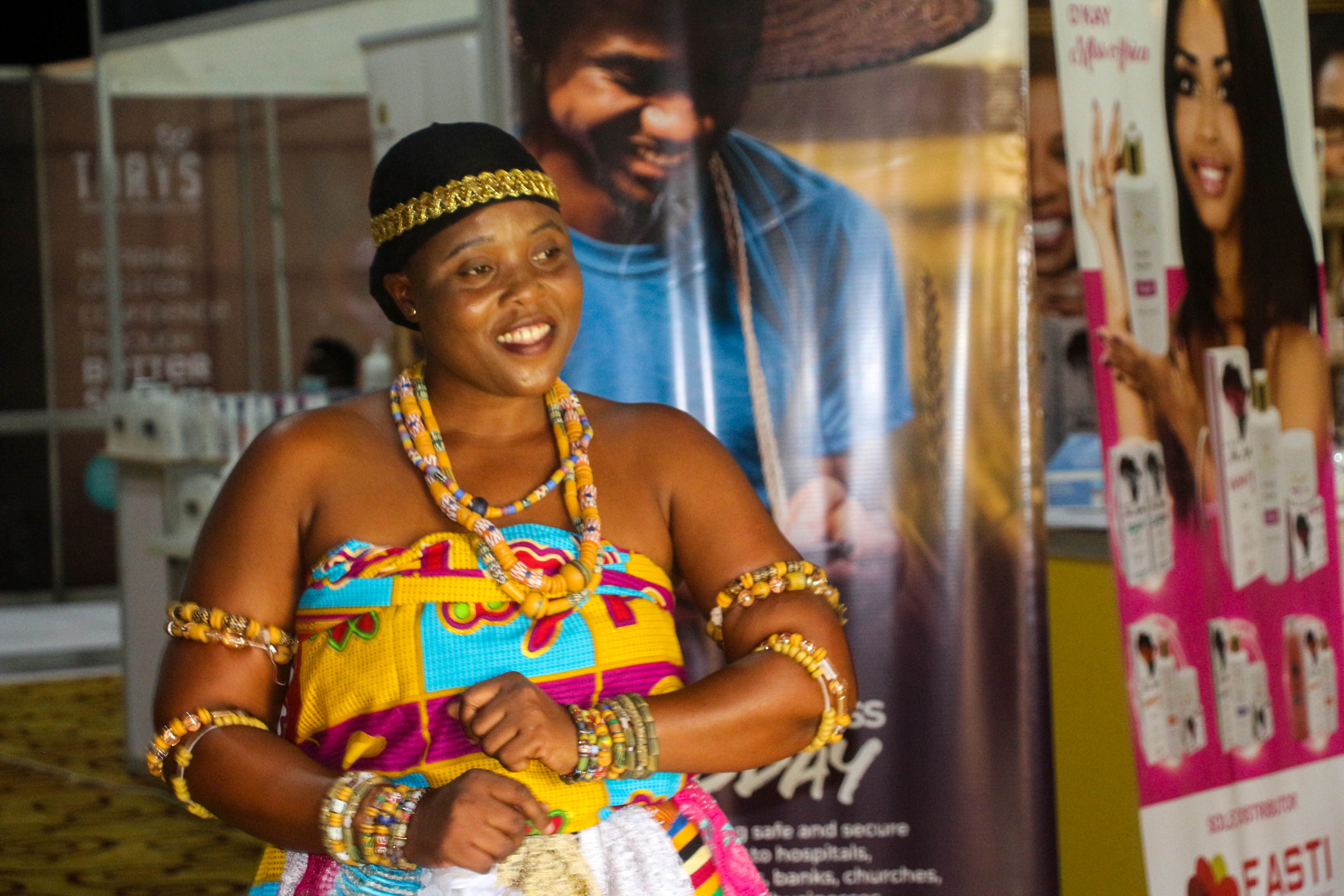
Adowa is a popular dance associated with the Akan people

The album is co-produced by Rab Bakari and Zapp Mallet. Makaa Maka!! dives deep into rhythmic Akan storytelling and folklore, with other languages like English, Ga, Ewe, Hausa, and Pidgin also playing significant roles in shaping the music. This would come to be known as Hiplife.

The fifth track on the album, "Makaa Maka", sets out with the rhythmic pattern of adowa, a traditional drumming type and dance which is associated with the Akan people in Ghana. It is then overlaid by a classical hip hop beat that results in an additional layer in the polyrhythmic structure, providing an example to hiplife's identity as both traditionally Ghanaian and broad in its production.

The eighth track on the album, "Tsoo Boi", which was re-released from his 1996 EP Tsoo Boi, shows a perfect example of how songs in the genre cross-references to older highlife songs. The opening verse of the song is set over a hip hop beat and a simple two-measure bass line similar to West Coast hip hop groups such as Cypress Hill. The line, "Adwoa, Adwoa, sɛ mɛntumi anka no yie, kosɛ, kosɛ" ('Adwoa, Adwoa [name], if I wasn't able to say it well, sorry, sorry'), is a reference to highlife classic "Adwoa" by A. B. Crentsil. In another line of the song, Rockstone raps "Ako te brɔfo a, me nso mete Fante/Frɛ, meyɛ Asante" ('If the parrot understands English, then I, too, speak Fante/Call, I am Asante'), which references Ako te brɔfo, a song by Ghanaian guitarist George Darko originally released in 1983 which became extremely popular in Ghana and among its diaspora due to its innovative sound.

== Critical reception and legacy ==
The album, on release, changed the landscape of Ghanaian popular music and earned Reggie Rockstone the title of "Grandpapa of Hip Life". Makaa Maka!! shown that it was cool to rap in your own dialect that doesn't have to be necessarily in English, like American rappers of the 90s.

== Track listing ==
Makaa Maka!! track listing
No.	Title	Producer(s)	Length
1.	"Live And Direct" (interlude)	Rab Bakari	0:35
2.	"Agoo!"	Rab Bakari	4:19
3.	"Sweetie Sweetie"	Rab Bakari	3:54
4.	"Nightlife In Accra" (featuring Cy Lover, Sammi B, and Chocolate)	Rab Bakari	6:55
5.	"Makaa Maka" (interlude)	Zapp Mallet	1:46
6.	"Ani agye" (featuring Cy Lover, Sammi B, Kwa-Cee, and Zapp Mallet)	Zapp Mallet	4:46
7.	"Chocolately Interview" (featuring Chocolate)	Zapp Mallet	1:41
8.	"Tsoo Boi"	Zapp Mallet	4:00
9.	"Makaa Maka, Pt.2" (interlude)	Zapp Mallet	2:10
10.	"Live Show Cut/Universal Ecstasy" (featuring Fredi Funkstone)	Rab Bakari	4:40
11.	"Nananom Kasa" (featuring Nananom)	Rab Bakari	0:20
12.	"Agro" (featuring Nananom)	Rab Bakari	4:16
13.	"Beaming From The Source" (featuring Fredi Funkstone)	Rab Bakari	4:08
14.	"Feedback" (featuring Fredi Funkstone)	Rab Bakari	3:22
15.	"Accra Allstars" (interlude)	Rab Bakari	0:21
16.	"Accra Allstars" (featuring Bayku, Cy Lover, Fredi Funkstone, and Talking Drums)	Rab Bakari	4:34
17.	"My Turn To Burn" (featuring Fredi Funkstone)		3:30
Total length:			55:25

== See also ==
- List of best-selling albums by country (Ghana)
- Pae Mu Ka

== Work cited ==
- Akrong, Isaac (23 June 2016). "Hip life music: re-defining Ghanaian culture (1990-2012)". York University. hdl:10315/31427. Archived from the original on 31 January 2025.
- Carl, Florian (2015). ""Obiaa pɛ sɛ ɔkɔ international" Negotiating the Local and the Global in Ghanaian Hiplife Music" (PDF). University of Cape Coast.
