= DJ Ashmen =

Ghanaian DJ

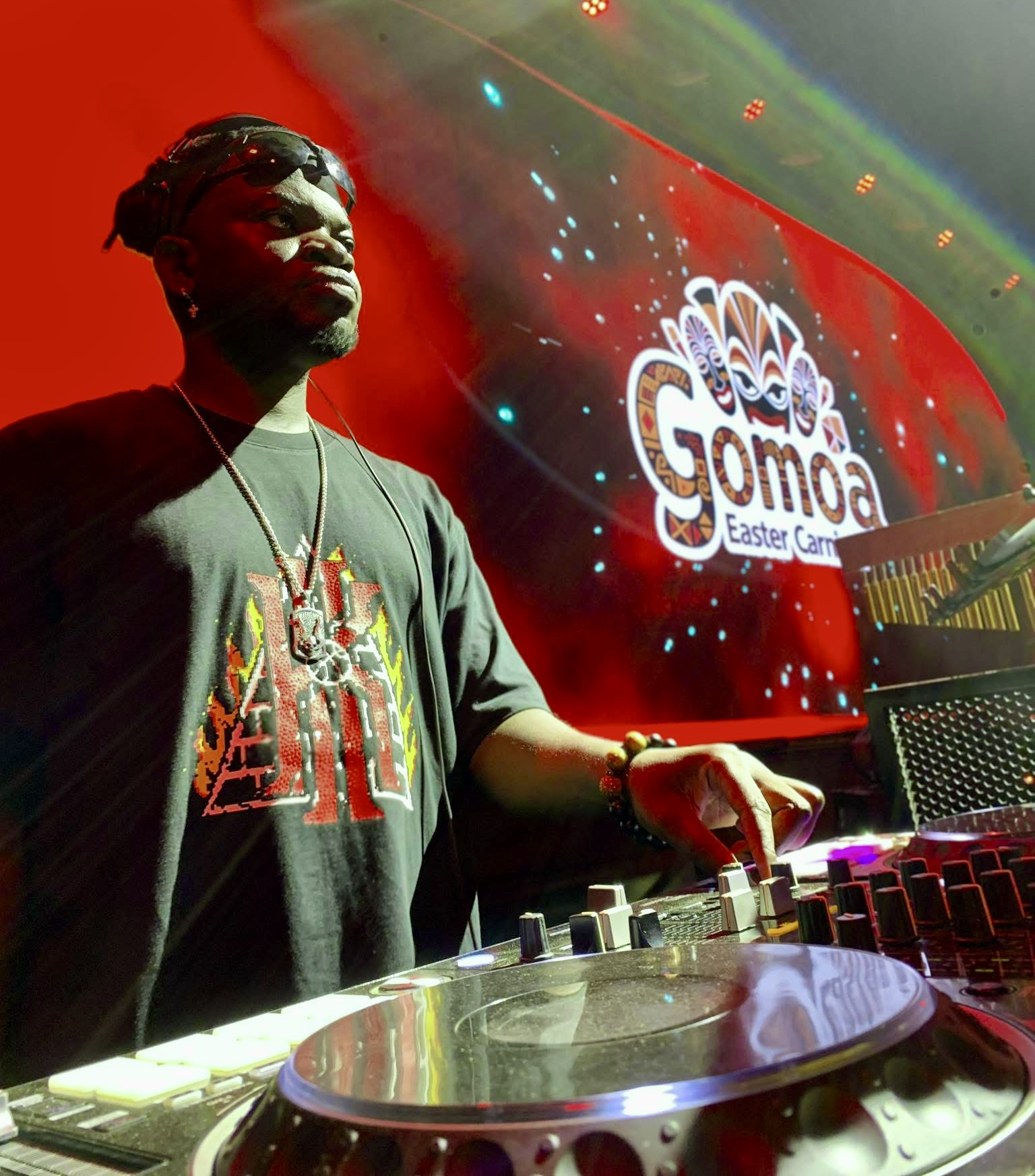
- DJ Ashmen performing at the Gomoa Easter Carnival

Background information
- Born: Michael Mensah Ashley
- Occupations: Disc Jockey, radio personality and music curator
- Years active: Early 2000 – present
- Website: https://djashmen.com/

DJ Ashmen (born Michael Mensah Ashley) is a Ghanaian disc jockey, radio personality, and music curator known for his work promoting and preserving Ghanaian music. His DJ sets and radio programming feature a wide range of Ghanaian genres, including Palm-wine music, burger highlife, contemporary highlife, hiplife, and Afrobeats.

== Early life and education ==
Michael Mensah Ashley was born in Accra. He grew up in Accra with his younger siblings. From an early age, he developed an interest in music and sound.

He attended the Accra Technical Training Centre, where he studied electronics. His technical education contributed to his interest in sound systems and audio engineering. He later undertook online courses related to DJing and music production.

During his youth, visits from relatives based in Nigeria exposed him to Nigerian music, which broadened his musical influences. Although he briefly explored dancing, he later focused on DJing and sound engineering.

== Career ==
DJ Ashmen began his career as a disc jockey in the early 2000s. His work spans live DJ performance, radio broadcasting, and music curation. He is known for incorporating different eras of Ghanaian music into his sets, including palm-wine music, burger highlife, late 1990s and early 2000s highlife, hiplife, and contemporary Afrobeats.

As a radio personality, he has curated and presented programmes featuring Ghanaian music, contributing to its promotion to both local and international audiences. Over the course of his career, he has released several mixtapes and curated music compilations.

In 2012, he gained significant recognition in the industry when he was nominated for Discovery DJ of the Year at the Ghana DJ Awards and has since been nominated over fourteen times. These nominations marked a significant milestone in his career, highlighting his rising influence and talent in the Ghanaian entertainment landscape.

He later announced a rebranding of his professional identity, including the introduction of a new logo and the expansion of his activities into areas such as music recording, music production, television programming, and DJ-themed events.

== Performances ==
DJ Ashmen has performed at various venues and events in Ghana and abroad. These include performances at the Rock City Night Club, Rapperholic and at events organised by the British High Commission in Ghana, including celebrations marking the birthday of the British monarch and performed at the event featuring the music duo Reggie N Bollie. He also performed at the 21st Ghana Club 100 Awards.

== Awards and nominations ==
DJ Ashmen has received several nominations during his career. He was nominated for the World Mixtape Awards, where he was the only African nominee in that category during the year of his nomination. Below are his nominations:

=== Official World Mixtape Awards ===
2013 - Best International Mixtape of the Year

=== Ghana DJ Awards ===
2012 - Discovery DJ of the Year

2014 - Best Mixtape dj of the Year

2015 - HipLife DJ of the Year

2016 - Best Mobile DJ Of The Year and Hip Life DJ Of The Year

2017 - Mixtape dj of the Year

2018 - Best male Radio dj of the Year

2019 - Best Afrobeats/Hip Life DJ of the year, Afrobeats/Hip Life DJ of the Year and Best Mobile DJ Of The Year

2020 - Lockdown DJ of the Year, Mixtape of the Year and Afrobeat/Hiplife DJ of the Year

2022 - Mixtape of the Year

2023 - Mixtape of the Year

2025 - HighLife DJ Of The Year and Mixtape Of The Year

=== Foklex Media Awards ===
2019/2020 - Radio DJ Of The Year

== Discography ==
DJ Ashmen has released a number of mixtapes and curated compilations. His work primarily features Ghanaian music genres such as highlife, hiplife, and Afrobeats.
