= Palenke Soultribe =

- Also known as: Palenke
- Origin: Colombia
- Genres: World, electronica, Latin, fusion, pop
- Years active: 2005–present
- Label: NatGeo Music / WC-Music
- Members: Andres F Erazo "Popa"; Juan Diego Borda "Insectosound"
- Website: www.palenkesoultribe.com

Palenke Soultribe is a live electronic music trio fusing electronic sounds with Afro-Colombian rhythms and melodies. Originally formed in Colombia, but now based in Los Angeles, Palenke Soultribe (a.k.a. PST) have claimed a spot in the Latin Alternative music world by putting on energetic shows, releasing musically interesting albums and remixes and always pushing the envelope visually and conceptually. The initial line up was formed by producer/bassist Juan Diego Borda and keyboardist/producer Andres "Popa" Erazo. Currently, PST continues to work as a collective, inviting guest producers, singers, songwriters and instrumentalists to their shows and to contribute on their albums.

== Origins ==
The origins of the band go back to 2001 when Erazo and Borda worked on demos through a project known as Polaina Dinamita. That experiment created an underground buzz in their hometown of Bogotá, Colombia, pioneering the experimental fusion of electronica with Caribbean music. Late in 2006, after completing personal projects, the duo decided to reunite in Los Angeles and start producing music again. This time, they took on a new name, Palenke Soultribe, narrowing down their sources of music. This time around PST would be more focused on exploring Afro–Colombian rhythms rather than incorporating all Latin-American music.

=== Band's name ===
Although Palenque is also the name given to a Maya city in southern Mexico that flourished in the 7th century, Palenke Soultribe actually derives their name from the village of San Basilio de Palenque, a village inhabited by escaped slaves as a refuge in the 17th century. The word ‘palenque’ actually means “walled city”. Of the many palenques of escaped slaves that existed previously, San Basilio is the only one that survives. These refugees were able to bring their culture, music and traditions to the small villages they formed in the jungle. The palenques are considered by many as the first free territory on the continent. As for the origins of 'Soultribe', Borda elaborates that "we just feel like we are a collective of musicians based on the soul, wanting to do great art".

== Recordings, releases and media attention ==
=== Samba of the World ===
In 2014, Palenke Soultribe collaborated with COPILOT Music and Sound on a cover of Carlinhos Brown's "Maria Caipirnha (Samba da Bahia)”. The arrangement represented the musical instrumentation and styles of Colombia for Visa's "Samba of the World", a digital campaign for the 2014 FIFA World Cup.

=== Te Veo Video (2010) ===
Following the release of Oro, Palenke teamed up with Miguel Navarro to film the video for their single Te Veo, on location in Bogotá, Colombia. That collaboration ended up being one of the most watched videos on MTV3

=== Oro (2009) ===
After a vibrant 2008, full of live shows in the United States, Palenke began work on their first professionally recorded album. Oro was the first of a planned trilogy, and featured eight songs and collaborations courtesy of top artists, including Cesar Pliego (of Grammy Award nominated band Kinky (band)), Grammy Award Winner Sr. Mendez, Miami's own Latin Grammy Award nominated band Locos Por Juana, Mr. Vallentao and Elastic Bond. Oro was mixed by Mark Needham who had previously worked with The Killers, Cake, Bloc Party, and Fleetwood Mac among others. Critics and fans received Oro positively, and it was considered their breakthrough album, receiving reviews by KCRW 89.9 and Billboard Magazine. Additionally, it was nominated once again by the Independent Music Awards.

It was also during this year, that prominent Los Angeles radio station KCRW, selected one song off the album, "No Voy a Morir" as Today's Top Tune.

=== Tropic and Heaven (2007) ===
Tropic and Heaven was a continuous mix CD with 10 tracks combining Colombian rhythms with electro break beats and house. Although produced in a home studio, this album was well received by critics and fans. As a result, PST won the Independent Music Award in the Dance/Electronica category.

=== Folkloric Dekonstruktion (2005) ===
This first work was a vinyl EP consisting of four dance songs featuring live accordion and Colombian percussion. The record was distributed independently by WC-Music and created a small buzz within the LA DJ scene. That EP gave Palenke the motivation to create their first full-length album.

== Notable performances ==
=== 2015 ===
- Pachanga Latino Music Festival

=== 2012 ===
- Fusion Festival, Lärz
- USA tour with Balkan Beat Box
- South by Southwest (SXSW), Austin, Texas

=== 2011 ===
- Winter Music Conference, Miami, Florida.

=== 2010 ===
- South by Southwest (SXSW), Austin, Texas. Spinner.com interview.
- Winter Music Conference, Miami, Florida. Miami New Times interview and review.
- Los Premios Shock, Colombia, alongside fellow Colombian bands Superlitio and Locos Por Juana.
- Festival Estereo Picnic, Bogotá, Colombia.
- Sunset Junction Street Festival

== Palenque vs. Palenke ==
In 2012, Palenke Soultribe (also known as PST) released an album titled Palenque vs. Palenque on Nat Geo Music. The album features reinterpretations of traditional Afro-Colombian music from San Basilio de Palenque, Colombia. It incorporates original session recordings from musicians including Petrona Martinez, Batata, Son Palenque, and Sexteto Tabala.

== Discography ==
Main source:

=== Singles & EPs ===
- Folkloric dekonstruction (2005)
- Tropico & Cielo Remixes (2007)
- Tropico & Cielo Remixes II (2008)
- Tropico & Cielo Remixes III (2008)
- Wepalenke (2010)
- ORO REMIXES (2010)
- VERSUS (2014)
- Hechiceria (2023)

=== Albums ===
- TROPIC N' HEAVEN (2007)
- ORO (2009)
- MAR (2013)
- SANGRE (2015)
