= Daasebre Dwamena =

Ghanaian highlife musician

- Born: Abubakar Siddiq; 1968; Koforidua, Ghana
- Died: 29 July 2016; Accra, Ghana
- Other name: Daasebre Dwamena
- Occupations: Singer; songwriter
- Musical career
- Genres: Highlife
- Instrument: Vocals
- Years active: 1990–2009

Daasebre Dwamena (Akan: Daasebrε Dwamena), was a Ghanaian highlife musician who became very popular for his hit album Kokooko (1999) which featured Lord Kenya. Kokooko was the first major fusion of hiplife and highlife in Ghana.

In 2006, Daasebre took a flight from Ghana to London to work on his music. At Heathrow airport he was arrested by police. His luggage contained 100 kilogrammes cocaine of which he claimed to have no clue of. After spending 11 months in jail, he was freed in 2007.

== Life and career ==
Daasebre was born a Muslim and from a royal home. His full name at birth was Daasebre Dwamenah Abubakar Siddiq. He released an album in the late 80s with no success. After spending time in various African states he returned to Ghana in 1992 only to make music 7 years later. His first hit, Kokooko, made him and Lord Kenya, who was featured on a song, gain huge success in Ghana and also among Ghanaians abroad. In January 2016, Dwamenah released what turned out to be his final album, Yenfii Ta, and in May released a song from the album and his final single, "Ntamago".

== Death ==
He died in the early hours of 29 July 2016 at the 37 Military Hospital in Accra.

== Honours and awards ==
He won two and four awards during the 2000 and 2002 editions of the Ghana Music Awards respectively.

== Discography ==
- Kokooko
- Ahoofe
- You Can't Touch Me
- Calling
- How Far?
- I Beg
- A Friend In Need
- Yeegye Apem
- Odo Yede
- Yenfii Ta
