= Iwan (musician) =

Ghanaian reggae and dancehall musician

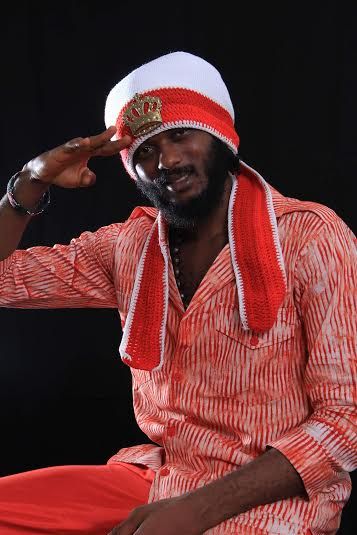

Background information
- Born: Abdul Razak Issahaku; 12 September 1985 (age 40); Accra, Ghana
- Genres: Reggae, dance hall
- Occupations: Musician, sound engineer
- Years active: (2008–present)
- Label: Gideon Force

Abdul Razak Issahaku (born 12 September 1985), performing as Iwan, is a reggae and dance hall artiste from Ghana.

== Career ==
In 2016, when his career had stalled, he signed a two-year contract with JahSigFamily, but months into the contract complained that the company wasn't giving him a car and accommodations, while the agency accused him of not helping to be marketable (including not shaving his facial hair) and not making music; the agency threatened legal action. In April of that year he released a single, "Who's Bad."

That same year he toured Ghana before election time, and included political and religious leaders.

== Discography ==
- My Time (2010)
- 12 September (2011)
- Jah (2014)
- Am A Gideon Mixtape (2015)
- Gaskiya (2016)
- Trust In The Lord (2017)
- The Return (2020)
- One Joint Album (2022)
