= Gbawe =

- Town
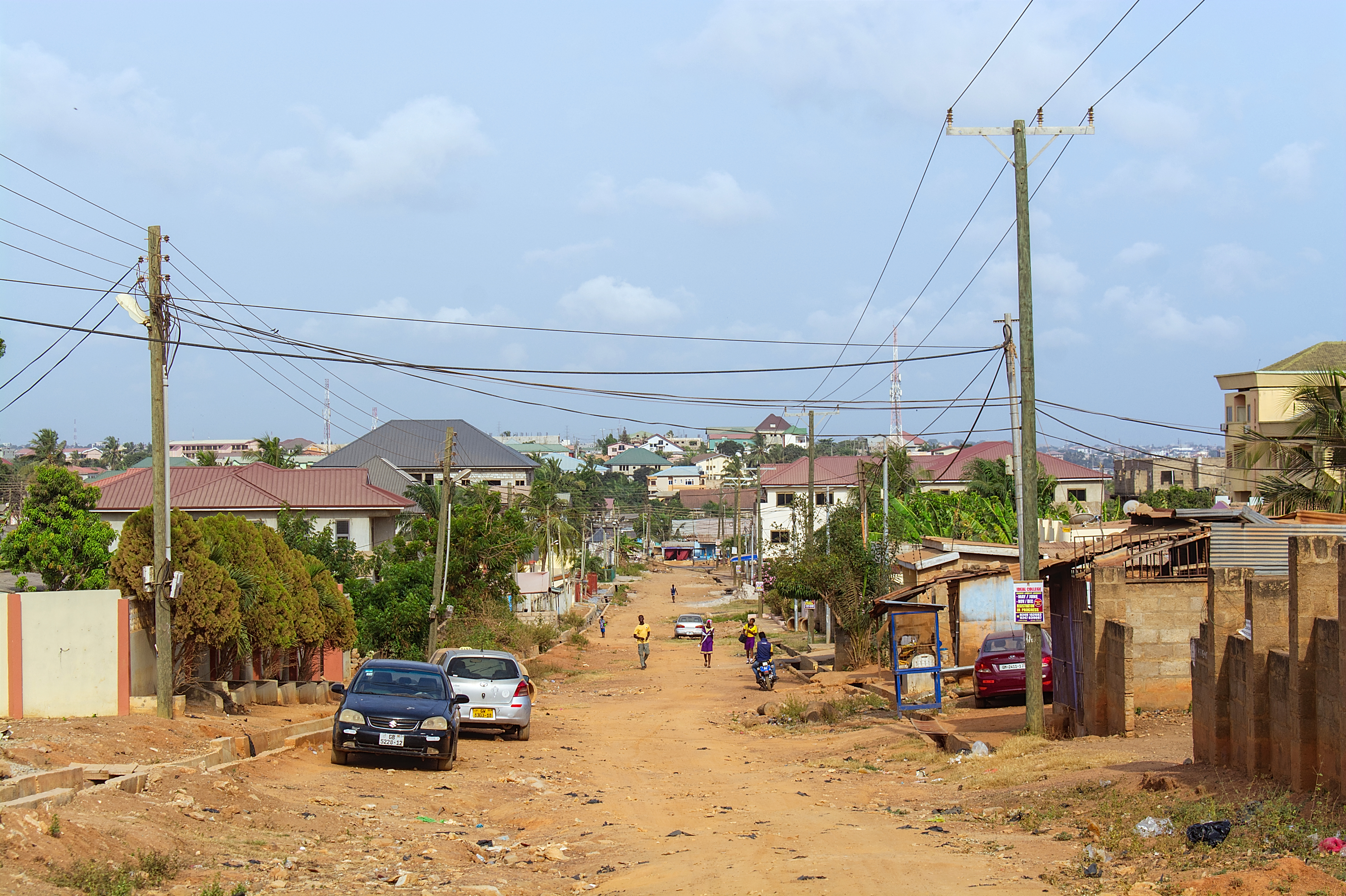
- Neighborhood in New Gbawe

- Location in Ghana
- Coordinates: 5°34′36″N 0°18′39″W
- Country: Ghana
- Region: Greater Accra Region
- District: Ga South Municipal Assembly

Population (2012)
  - Total: 74,403
- Ranked 23rd in Ghana
- Time zone: GMT
  - Summer (DST): GMT

Gbawe is a town in the Greater Accra Region of southeastern Ghana near the capital Accra. Gbawe is the twenty-third largest settlement in Ghana, in terms of population, with a population of 74,403 people. Gbawe is located a few kilometres west of Accra in the Ga South Municipal Assembly. At the Ghana census of 26 March 2000, the population was 28,989 inhabitants living in the Town. Projections of 1 January 2007 estimated the population to be 52,910 inhabitants. In the census of 1984, only 837 residents were listed, and in 1970 it was the 608th largest settlement in Ghana. The Town was founded more than 100 years ago. Today the Town has a more rural structure in the large-scale marked suburban development areas.

== See also ==
- Railway stations in Ghana
