= Guayo Cedeño =

Honduran musician (1974–2022)

- Born: Ramón Eduardo Cedeño; 7 January 1974; La Ceiba, Honduras
- Origin: Honduras
- Died: 11 March 2022 (aged 48)
- Genres: Rock; Jazz; Folklore; World music
- Occupations: Musician guitarist producer
- Instruments: Guitar bass guitar Percussions
- Years active: 1989–2022
- Labels: Ceibon Studio Pro; Stonetree Records
- Website: guayocedeno.com

Ramón Eduardo "Guayo" Cedeño (7 January 1974 – 11 March 2022) was a Honduran musician and producer from La Ceiba, Honduras. He worked with many Garifuna music stars, including Andy Palacio & The Garifuna Collective and Aurelio Martinez, as well as performing at jazz festivals with his band or in his jazz-rock trio. After a career as a sideman, his first solo album was released in the spring of 2015. His trio performed with Aurelio Martinez at World Music Expo in 2014.

In 2014, Cedeño collaborated with COPILOT Music and Sound on a cover of Carlinhos Brown's "Maria Caipirnha (Samba da Bahia)”. The arrangement represented the musical instrumentation and styles of Honduras for Visa's "Samba of the World", a digital campaign for the 2014 FIFA World Cup.

Cedeño was married to Gaby Flores, and they had one daughter. He died from respiratory failure on 11 March 2022, at the age of 48.

== Discography ==
- Coco Bar (2015)
