= Reggie Rockstone =

Ghanaian rapper (born 1964)

- Also known as: Hip life Grand papa
- Born: Reginald Yaw Asante Osei; 11 April 1964 (age 62)
- Genres: Hip hop, Hiplife
- Occupations: Rapper, entrepreneur, producer
- Years active: (1990–present)
- Label: Kassa records

Reggie Rockstone (Reginald Yaw Asante Ossei, "the Godfather of Hiplife") is a Ghanaian rapper. He was born in the United Kingdom but lived his early years in Kumasi and Accra. He has been living in Ghana continuously since he pioneered the Hip-Life movement in 1994. He is married to Dr. Zilla Limann, Daughter of Hilla Limann, the only president of the third Republic of Ghana. They have three kids together and have been married since 2001.

He pioneered the Hiplife art and has played an important role in the development of this uniquely African genre in Ghana. He raps in Akan precisely Asante Twi and English. In 2004, Rockstone won the Kora Award for the best African video and he performed in front of a 50,000-person crowd in Ghana, together with Shaggy. In 2006, he recorded a track with the Jamaican Dancehall singer Beenie Man called "Chukku Chakka" (in reference to Rockstone's 1999 hit "Eye Mo De Anaa", which sampled Fela Kuti). Rockstone is featured in the 2007 documentary "Living the Hiplife" (dir. Jesse Weaver Shipley).

Reggie Rockstone set to make a guest appearance in the ring in an MMA fight against William Adom, at the Bukom Boxing arena on the second day of April 2025

Reggie Rockstone is the son of fashion designer Ricky "Ricci" Ossei (Saint Ossei). Reggie Rockstone attended Achimota School. Rockstone joined the Ghanaian hip hop group VVIP following the exit of Promzy in 2014.

== Early life and music career ==
Born in the U.K. on April 11, 1964, Reginald Osei aka Reggie Rockstone attached himself to the Hip Hop movement in the early 80's as a dancer. Travelling on a tri-continental basis (i.e. Accra, New York, London), he broadened his Hip Hop scope. As a performer and trained actor, he began rapping in 1991.

His first 'fifteen minutes of fame' came as a dancer in Accra in the early 80's. His second chance at fame came in 1992–93 as a member of one of the top rap groups from London, England. He belonged to PLZ (Parables, Linguistics and Zlang) with Fredi Funkstone, Jay (both from West Africa) & DJ Pogo of the U.K. Number one hits from PLZ included "If it Aint PLZ" and an EP entitled "Build a Wall Around Your Dreams" released on an independent label called "Go For the Juggler." 1994 became the watershed or turning point in his entertainment career. The rap scene in London was not rewarding enough. He returned to Accra to encounter a whole generation of people grooving to African-American rhythms, all heavily influenced by the same elements of Hip Hop that he knew.

== Recognition and music style ==
He used the hip hop beats with authentic phat production and laced it with true African dialect; The Akan language of Twi. It became the tool to make such butter classics as "Sweetie, Sweetie", "Tsoo Boi", "Nightlife in Accra" and "Agoo" from his debut album in 1997 entitled "Makaa! Maka!". Launched on an independent label called KASSA RECORDS that he partly owns, Rockstone has reached Ghanaians and non-Ghanaians across four continents Reggie Rockstone is credited as the pioneer of hiplife or "Kasahare music" in Ghana and like some masters of the art of hip hop, he has proclaimed his retirement and out of retirement several times. His specialty is Asante Twi. He is internationally acclaimed, with several performances throughout West Africa, the UK, France, USA and Switzerland. DJ Ashmen in celebrating Reggie Rockstone dedicated "The GODfather" mixtape to his contribution to Hiplife.

== Appointments to be on judges panels ==
In 2013 he was selected to be a judge of the maiden edition of the Glo X Factor Africa along with Onyeka Onwenu and M.I. He was also a judge for the fifth edition of the Malta Guinness Street Dance competition in 2012.

== Globacom brand ambassador ==
In 2009, Rockstone was one of 17 Public figures, who were outdoored by Globacom to endorse their brand, which was part of their preparations to roll out in Ghana. There was an allegation that he had been dropped as an ambassador but he denied the reports.

== Rockstone condoms ==
He introduced Rockstone Condoms, which is his own brand of contraceptive to the Ghanaian market in August 2013. With this move, he was pitching into the zero infection or prevalence initiative against HIV/AIDS's goals.

== Albums ==
Rockstone recorded four albums for the Kassa Records label and one for MixerPot:

- Makaa Maka (I Said It Because I Said It), 1997
- Me Na Me Kae (I Was The One Who Said It), 1999
- Me Ka (I Will Say), 2000
- Last show, 2004
- Reggiestration, 2010

== Rockz Waakye ==
He owns a food distribution business that packages the Ghanaian dish waakye for delivery to hotels. The food is packaged in glass jars.
