= Amandzeba Nat Brew =

- Born: Accra, Ghana
- Origin: Ghanaian
- Genres: Highlife
- Instrument: vocal
- Years active: 1992–present

Amandzeba Nat Brew (also referred to as Nat Brew (Amandzeba), and Amandzeba), is a Ghanaian highlife artist.

== Early life ==
Amandzeba is an alumnus of the Christian Methodist Senior High School in Accra.

== Musical career ==
Amandzeba first became known as part of the band Nakorex, formed in 1992 with Akosua Agyapong and Rex Omar. Amandzeba later became married to Akosua Agyapong, though they were subsequently divorced. Amandzeba is most known in Ghana for his song Wogbejeke, off the album of the same name.

Following the success of Wogbejeke, Nat Brew adopted the name Amandzeba, meaning "Tradition Child" or "Custom Child", to reflect his African roots. In January 2020 Amandzeba signed with US label Jah Mikal Entertainment and announced the release of a new album and a collaboration with the US rapper, Michael Morgan, to make a remix of Wogbejeke. Amandzeba was briefly hospitalised following a car-accident in the same month. In May 2020 Amandzeba released a song honouring frontline workers during the COVID-19 pandemic.

== Political activities ==
Amandzeba has also been active in politics, singing a duet with President John Mahama during the 2016 Ghanaian election campaign and criticising the African Union in 2018. Amandzeba has offered to support the political platform of any political party that will pay for his services.
