= Rex Omar =

Ghanaian highlife artist

Rex Omar (AKA Rex Owusu Marfo)
- Born: Ghana
- Origin: Ghanaian
- Genres: Highlife
- Instrument: vocal
- Years active: 1989–present
- Formerly of: Nakorex

Rex Omar (real name Rex Owusu Marfo) is a Ghanaian highlife artist. He first rose to prominence in 1989 with the Aware Pa album which also included the track, Wodofo Ne Hwan? Following this, in 1992 he formed the Highlife Supergroup Nakorex together with fellow Highlife artists Nat Brew and Akosua Agyapong, the group's name being an acronym made up of the first letters of each member's name. He then pursued a solo career. He performed together with Sony Achiba. In 2004 Omar was nominated for a Kora award, and in 2005 he was nominated as Artiste of the Year in the Ghana Music Awards.

Following the break-up of the group he eventually became the head of the Ghana Music Rights Organisation (GHAMRO), and in his role as an advocate for greater copyright protections for Ghanaian musicians successfully lobbied president John Agyekum Kufuor to withhold asset to the new Copyright Bill in order for protections to be strengthened. He has also called for greater protections for the Ghanaian music market from foreign competition.

In January 2020 he won a copyright infringement lawsuit against Joy Industries, for using a part of his song Dada Di Da to advertise Joy Dadi Bitters without his consent. The company was ordered by the High Court to pay costs of GH₵ 30,000 and damages of GH₵ 200,000 to Rex Omar. Omar has feuded with former band-mate Akosua Agyapong over alleged misappropriation of GHAMRO funds.

== His songs ==
Some his hit songs includes;

1. Obi Do ba
2. Abiba
3. Konkontey
4. Dada
5. Dangerous
6. Mama etc.
