= Ronny Coaches =

Ghanaian hiplife musician

Ronnie Coaches
- Also known as: Ronnie
- Born: Ghana
- Died: 21 November 2013
- Genres: Ragga

Ronnie Coaches (died 21 November 2013), also known as Ronnie, was a Ghanaian-born musician and a member of the Buk Bak hiplife music group.

== Education ==
He had his secondary school education in Datus Complex School. He also had technical training at Accra Technical Training Centre (ATTC).

== Death ==
Ronnie died on 21 November 2013 at Korle Bu Teaching Hospital after a severe heart attack.
