= Castro (musician) =

Ghanaian musician (1982–2014)

Background information
- Also known as: Castro Under Fire; Castro De D’Destroyer
- Born: Theophilus Tagoe; 1 May 1982; Takoradi, Ghana
- Genres: Hiplife; Afrobeats; Azonto
- Occupations: Singer; songwriter
- Years active: 2003–2014
- Labels: Baby Jet; Wongye
- Disappeared: July 6, 2014 (aged 32); Ada Estuary
- Status: Missing for 12 years, 3 months and 26 days

Theophilus Tagoe (born 1 May 1982 – disappeared 6 July 2014), known professionally as Castro, was a Ghanaian hiplife musician.

== Early life and career ==
He was born in Takoradi in the Western Region of Ghana in 1982 to late Lydia Tagoe (a trader) and Mr. Cofie (an accountant). He had his primary and Junior high education at the All Saints Anglican Primary School in Takoradi. He started singing as early as age 10 and entered the musical scene with his 2003 hit song "Sradenam". He had features on the hip-life group 4x4 hit track, "Sikletele," which officially introduced him to the local music scene before he launched his debut album in 2003.

Castro was a friend of Ghana national football team's captain, Asamoah Gyan. The duo recorded three albums together. "African Girls" was a popular song of theirs.

== Disappearance ==
On 6 July 2014, Castro and Miss Janet Bandu were reported to have drowned following a jet ski accident in Ada Estuary while on holiday with the Gyan brothers. The jet ski involved in the accident was recovered on the same day of their disappearance but their bodies had not been recovered, despite a search by the police. Little is known of his disappearance.

Recounting events surrounding Castro's disappearance, Gyan said: "That was the first time they went to Aqua Safari and that in the previous years, they went to Akosombo. That particular year, the yacht at Akosombo was broken down so they decided to go to Ada. Before going to Ada, they called to find out if they could get a bigger yacht because, their friends always organised to bring their lady friends so as to make the party fun, so they were told they could get two yachts at Ada. Castro called me a week before I returned to Ghana and said he may not be able to go with us since a friend of his was bereaved, and he had to attend the funeral in Kumasi. A day before we went to Ada, he [Castro] came to my house and said he was on his way to Kumasi and would not join us. But whilst we were on our way to Ada, on the Accra-Tema motorway, we received a phone call that 'Under' [Castro] wants us to wait for him. We parked at a fuel filling station where a crowd gathered to catch a glimpse of me. I later got the inclination it was destined to happen because he was initially not part of the trip. When we got to Ada, everything went fine. We were to spend three days. We started using the Jet Ski on the second day."

== Discography ==
- Sarkodie - Adonai ft. Castro
- African Girls ft. Asamoah Gyan
- Itz Tiffany - Agyekoom ft. Castro
- Da Prince (Pastor Leo) - Afrebo ft. Castro
- Cash Unit - Ayoo ft. Castro & Skrewfaze
- Edem - Arab Story ft. Castro
- Castro - Ay33 ft. Skrewfaze
- Castro - Touch Ya Body ft. Westside Legacy
- Castro - Enum D3 ft. Westside Legacy
- Castro - Faa Noo Saa ft. Westside Legacy
- Castro - Personal Person ft. D-Black
- Mzbel - 16 Years ft. Castro
- Mzbel - Edey Be ft. Castro
- Mzbel - Me Pe ft. Castro

== Album ==
- Damages
- Toffee
- Back 2 Sender ft. Asamoah Gyan
- Castro D'destroyer 's Hitz
- Best of Castro [Posthumous Album]

== Awards ==
=== Ghana Music Awards ===
In the year 2006, he won the Hiplife Artiste of the Year as well as the Hiplife Album of the Year, with his song "Toffee". This award won him so much recognition in and outside Ghana.

In the year 2011, he won the Best Hiplife Song of the Year which featured Asamoah Gyan with the song "African Girls".

Year	Recipient	Award	Result
2006	"Toffee"	Hiplife Song of the Year	Won
2006	"Toffee"	Hiplife Album of the Year	Won
2011	"African Girls"	Best Hiplife Song of the Year	Won
2014	"Odo Pa"	Highlife Song of the Year	Won
