= Buk Bak =

Ghanaian musical group

- Origin: Accra, Ghana
- Genres: Hiplife; Hip hop
- Years active: 2004–2013
- Members: Prince Bright; Ronnie Coaches

Buk Bak was a Ghanaian musical group composed of Prince Bright, Isaac Shoetan and Ronny Coaches. They rapped in Ga, Twi, and Pidgin, and were the first hiplife group in Ghana to be successful with Ga lyrics.

As of 2006, they were both pursuing individual projects. Bright and Ronny reunited in 2012 to record what turned out to be their final album as a group, Fisherman Anthem. The original group had more members, some of whom have formed groups like 4x4. The group split in November 2013, after the death of Ronny Coaches.

== History ==
Buk Bak, coined from “book back,” was first formed to see how far Prince Bright (also known as Bling Sparkles), Ronnie Coaches, and Isaac Shoetan (known as Papa Shoto) could go considering their love for music as a window to vent their feelings and means to entertain their ever-increasing fan base. It didn't come as a surprise when they were headlining shows from Ghana, the US, and UK, to many other places. They began freestyling and gained that street credibility every artist needed back then to survive the Ghanaian hiplife industry.

In an inter-school rap contest, Ronnie Coaches who was pursuing auto mechanics at Accra Technical Training College (ATTC) came in second with his group and Shoetan and Bling Sparkles came in third. Ronnie had already built a huge fan base in ATTC but Isaac Shoetan and Bling Sparkles spoke to Ronnie about joining Buk Bak and his acceptance made the group begin talking about putting out an album. Isaac Shoetan, known as Papa Shoto, was an Adisadel College student. They signed on to Abib Records, which the group described in an interview as a “good contract and good money”. The group then recorded their first studio album “Komi Kἐ Kena", and then followed it up with “Awἐnsἐm” before topping it with “Nkomhyἐ” with Abib Records. After a few years, Isaac Shoetan left the group to pursue his own projects, leaving Coaches and Bright to record “1662”, “SikaKorkor”, and then “Gold Coast” with Agicoat Records before Coaches and Bright also split themselves to pursue their solo projects in 2006.

Bling Sparkles recorded “Light over Darkness” which had the hit single “Condom,” with Prince Dave Records. He then moved to the United States to pursue other equally important projects. Coaches recorded “Screen Saver,” an equally successful album before the two announced their comeback in 2012 to release the club banger “Kolom”. The duo's songs were inspired by experiences they dealt with growing up. Both grew up in a compound house where a lot of things occurred, and they used those memories and put them into their songs. Buk Bak was popular for their party songs that fans loved dancing to. They mentored 4X4, Castro, Pope Skinny, K-2, Buky Core, and many other artists. Buk Bak's belief in mentoring other artists was because “when you are at the top alone it will get to a time you will feel lonely so we should help several other people come up there so we can all enjoy life”.

On November 21, 2013, Coaches was pronounced dead at the Korle Bu Teaching Hospital in Accra, Ghana, after having suffered a heart attack.

== Albums ==
- KomiKἐKena – Abib Records 1998
- Awἐnsἐm – Abib Records 2000
- Nkomhyἐ – Abib Records 2001
- Sika Korkor – Agicoat Records 2002 (Won Three Ghana Music Awards)
- Gold Coast – Agicoat Records (2004)
- Light Over Darkness – Bling Sparkles solo album under Prince Dave Records (2005)
- The Screensaver – Ronnie Coaches solo album R & C Records (2006)
- Fisherman Anthem – Global One Entertainment (2012)

== Awards ==
- The Young Achievers Awards at The National Theatre
- Ghana Music Awards 2003

- (Best Hip Life Group)
- (Hip Life Song of the Year)
- (Album of the Year)

- Our Music Awards
- 4syte Music Awards (2010)
- Loud In GH Best Comeback Artist 2012

== See also ==
- Ghanaian Hip Pop
- Music of Ghana
- List of Ghanaian musicians
- Hiplife
