= Akosua Agyapong =

Ghanaian highlife artiste (born 1969)

- Born: Akosua Agyapong; 17 November 1969 (age 56); Accra, Ghana
- Genre: Highlife
- Instrument: Voice
- Years active: 1990–present

Akosua Agyapong (also spelled Agyepong; born 17 November 1969), is a Ghanaian female highlife singer and television personality. She was honored by the organizers of 3Music Awards for her achievement in the entertainment industry in Ghana.

== Early life ==
Akosua Agyapong was born on 17 November 1969 in Accra, Ghana, to Asante and Akyem parents. She had her secondary education at the Holy Child High School in Cape Coast. Her mother was a Catholic while her father was an Anglican.

== Career ==
Agyapong began singing at an early age and was discovered in the 1990s by highlife artiste Nana Ampadu, a highlife legend.

Her first album, Frema, was released on January 1, 1990. Frema had songs such as "Me ye Obaa" that became instant hits, in addition to other tracks, such as "Born again", "Anan tuo", and "San be hwe wo mba" among others.

After the success of Frema, she met Nat Brew and Rex Omar, who inspired her to release her subsequent album Esiwa, another instant hit. In 1992, she formed the Highlife Supergroup NAKOREX together with Brew and Omar, the group's name being an acronym made up of the first letters of each member's name, and released the song 'Kpanlogo'.

After NAKOREX, Agyapong went into a long hiatus and later resurfaced as a gospel artist. To date, she has five albums to her credit, with additional albums in collaboration without as couples but working pace with NAKOREX and another as a member of NAKOREX.

Agyapong was honored in August 2019 at event dubbed “Celebrating Akosua Adjepong 30@50”. This was to celebrate her for having chalked 30 years as an artist.

== Personal life ==
Agyapong dated fellow NAKOREX member Amandzeba Nat Brew in 1994. They got married for a few years, though eventually divorced. She is now married to Prophet Daniel Asamoah-Larbi. She has six children, four with Amandzeba Nat Brew, and two with her current husband.
