= Lord Kenya =

Ghanaian evangelist

Kainya (born 19 September 1978), known as Lord Kenya, is a former Ghanaian hiplife artist who is currently an evangelist. He is best known for his hits such as "Enyom No" and "Medo."

== About ==
Lord Kenya was born to an Nzema father from Sanzule and an Asante mother from Fumesua in Kumasi both in Ghana. Lord Kenya's father was the late Nana Akpor Kainya. He earned the name Lord Kenya. As of October 18, 2010 Lord Kenya turned away from becoming an artist to actually becoming an evangelist. Before turning into an evangelist, the award winning hiplife star struggled with a severe 10 year drug addiction. During Lord kenya's public declaration of his testitimony about his concaine usage, he made mention of the fact that he used to be a cocaine user. He was dealing in drug usage for about 11 years. According to him, the cocaine usage begun when he was about to release his album "Sika Ba". His concaine usage begun when his friend introduced him to drug usage. In an attempt to influence lord kenya in doing drugs, his friend made it clear to him that an individual can not become a super star without drug usage. As of 2026, Lord kenya is now an active founder of the face of grace covenant temple in Ahodwo, Kumasi in 2026. Lord Kenya's hobbies were writing and performing literature-based rap music.

== Education ==
He began his primary education at Central International School and had his secondary education at Anglican Senior High School, Kumasi in the Ashanti Region and Nkwatia Secondary School in the Eastern Region of Ghana. He then did his sixth form at the Mpraeso Secondary School in the Eastern Region of Ghana. At the Kumasi Anglican Senior High School, he was the 400m and 110m hurdles top athlete.

== Career ==
Lord Kenya's desire to become a professional musician began at age 17, although he was familiarized with music right after birth. His parents desire was for him to practice law but a performance at his father's birthday party made the party's audience appreciate his singing talent. He joined Slip Music in 1998. In 1998 he also released his debut album Sika Card which instantly became one of the nations hits. He has seven albums to his credit; these are: Sika Card (1998), Sika Baa (1998), Yeesom Sika (which topped charts in Ghana) (2001), Sika Mpo Fane Ho (2002), Akasieni (2004), Born Again (2006) and God Dey (2008).

== Awards ==
Lord Kenya was nominated as the Artist of the Year while the title track of his second album Sika Baa also nominated as Rap Music of the Year at the first Ghana Music Awards. He is the winner of the Hiplife Album of the Year at the Ghana Music Award 2001 and Best Ghanaian Rap Music Award at the Anansekrom Festival in Canada 2000, as well as a string of nominations elsewhere. The albums Sika Baa (1999) and Yeesom Sika (2001) are Lord Kenya's albums which secured his status as a legendary figure in Ghanaian hiplife. On October 28, 2010 award winning Ghanaian hiplife artist lord kenya gave up secular music to become an evangelist after a said spiritual experience.

== Conversion and ministry ==
He had an encounter with the Holy Spirit on 28 October 2010 and has not looked back ever since. He is the leader of the Face of Grace Covenant Temple at Ahodwo in Kumasi. He launched his Gospel album 'Christlife' in 2011. He has given up the rights to his hiplife albums and has no interest in their royalties. The switch was not easy in the beginning, especially with his financial status but he was happy with his new life because it would save his soul.
