= Mzbel =

Ghanaian hiplife musician

- Born: Belinda Nana Ekua Amoah; 26 December 1979 (age 46)
- Genres: Hiplife, High Life
- Occupations: Singer, Songwriter, Musician, Entrepreneur
- Years active: 2002 - present
- Label: Mzbel Music
- Website: www.instagram.com/mzbeldaily

Belinda Nana Ekua Amoah (born 26 December 1979), popularly known as Mzbel, is a Ghanaian Hiplife artist. She is the CEO of Mzbel Music, Bel Group, Bel Eye Media and others. Mzbel is also a radio presenter and an actor, having appeared in several movies. She is a global ambassador for people with disability.

== Early life and education ==
Growing up in Jamestown, she attended the God Wisdom Preparatory school and continued to Korle Gonno 1 and Owusu Mills' JHS at Mamprobi for her junior high school education. She admitted to skin bleaching in her teen years because it was the norm in Jamestown.

Mzbel then continued to pursue secondary education at Abuakwa State College. She studied General Arts, majoring in Economics, Geography and French. She then applied to study at the Ghana Institute of Languages and trained to become a bilingual secretary.

== Music career ==
After her course at the Ghana Institute of Languages and some time with Manifold Tutorial College, she earned an internship slot with GBC Radio 1, where she hosted a children's program "Mmofra Kyepem". From GBC Radio 1 she joined Groove FM (now Adom FM), as an intern and co-hosted a child focused program titled 'Kids on Groove'.

Having worked with Groove FM for a while, she moved to TV3 as a production assistant for one of the station's youth-centered programs known as Goldblast. She also worked as the floor manager for the same show and also as a production assistant for another program the "Talking Drum".

In the year 2002, she had the opportunity to work with Hush Hush Studios, which at that time had come on the scene as a new production firm. While at Hush Hush, she sometimes would enter the studio, and as the technicians played their instruments, she sang along to songs she had created. These were songs she would usually sing to herself with no serious intention of pursuing a music career. While working part-time at Hush Hush Studios, she secured another job, at Metro TV as the only digital video editor and also a presenter for 'Smash TV', a weekend entertainment program.

After leaving Metro TV, she was employed by Apex Advertising as a video editor and production manager. She continued to pursue a music career while working at Apex, however, she found the two to be overly demanding, and chose to focus on her music.

Over time, she has been criticized for her choice of clothes which have been described as "sexy" or "skimpy". Mzbel believes, however, that as an artist, you must look unique. She has always had the ambition to be a source of inspiration for the underprivileged and to be able to help the down trodden.

Mzbel signed with Ginger Global Music Distribution in 2022.

== Discography ==
=== Albums ===
- 16 years
- Tongues
- Awoso Me
- Legelege
- Saucy Girl
- Edey Be

=== Singles ===
- 16 Years
- She Saw Me
- Asibolanga
- Gamashi Life

== Videography ==
Title	Year	Ref
Legelege	—N/a	
Mmo		
Slowly	—N/a	
Go Your Way	—N/a	
Asibolanga	2022	
This Thing	2016	
One More Time	2016	
illegal Connection	2016	
16 years	2015	
Edey Be	2016	
Obaa	2019	
Fakye	2019	
Go Your Way	2019	
Tongues	2018	
Onye Ogbemi	2015	
Mama Sweet	2019	
