= Hiplife =

Music genre from Ghana

- Stylistic origins: Highlife; hip hop; reggaeton
- Cultural origins: 1990s, Ghana

Fusion genres
- Raglife

Hiplife is a Ghanaian musical style that fuses Ghanaian culture and hip hop. Recorded predominantly in the Ghanaian Akan language, hiplife rapidly grew in popularity through the 2010s to present; throughout West Africa and abroad, especially in the United Kingdom, United States, Canada and Germany.

== History ==
Reginald Osei, known in music circles as Reggie Rockstone, is touted by some as the originator of hiplife; others disagree. Nonetheless, the origins of Ghanaian hip hop go back to the 1980s, with performers such as K.K. Kabobo and Gyedu Blay Ambolley. As early as 1973, Ambolley released his first record, "Simigwado" – a semi-rap in Fante-style highlife – to a small audience, which showed him performing highlife variations with fast-spoken, poetic lyrics. Ambolley would go on to be hailed the father of rap, not only in Ghana but in the world. Over time, Ghanaians became influenced by American hip hop, reggae, dance hall. There was an emerging underground hip hop collective in the capital Accra.

Hiplife's history dates back to the early 1990s. Jeff Tennyson Quaye, better known around the world as Jay Q, one of the pioneers of hiplife (in the mid-1990s), is considered the backbone of Ghana music as a whole; in recognition of his own variation and introduction of Jama/kpanlogo to hiplife, he has been called the King of Jama. Reginald "Reggie Rockstone" Ossei also began to craft this art form with producers Mike Cooke, Rab Bakari, Zapp Mallet and Coal house. Chief G and the Tribe was one of the first rap groups in Ghana consisting of Chief G (now known as Jay Ghartey), Abeeku and Kwaku T performing rap as far back as 1989. After they broke up before Reggie's foray into what is now termed hiplife, Talking Drums, consisting of Kwaku-T and Bayku, experimented with choruses and hooks in local languages. In Twi, Reggie would flow over hip-hop beats, a style that had been used previously in Mahoney P's debut album Kofi Babone.

In that same era, the group Native Funk Lords (NFL) came out with Pidgin rap; the originators of the genre were from the Kay's Frequency camp: Tinniequaye, Cil, Jake & Eddy Blay. This group also took inspiration from bands such as Osibisa and Ghanaba of Ghana. Rapper and producer Cavell was also part of the original NFL collective and is now known to many as The Mantis.

Reggie Rockstone has been described as the "Godfather of Hiplife" since he spawned a new music genre in the country. After his debut album Makaa Maka, with the hit single "Choo boi", several hiplife acts followed. Although in several radio interviews in 2004, Reggie Rockstone stated that he does not perform hiplife, this could be mainly attributed to the fact that he now prefers to rap in English.

A new era was born in late 1998 when a young producer known as Hammer of The Last Two emerged with original beats plus precision rap artistes. Hammer, born Edward Nana Poku Osei, managed to fuse hip-hop grooves with local tempo and sweet melody, which caught the attention of both the elite and masses instantly. Known for his heavy drums and lead trumpets, Hammer had an originality that elevated hiplife to greater heights, inspiring and influencing a whole generation of producers including Richie, Ball J, Kill Beats, Jayso, EL, and others. In addition, some of the biggest artistes in hiplife today were in Hammer of The Last Two's line-up, among them Kwaw Kesse, Ayigbe Edem, odeshi, Obrafour, Tinny, Sarkodie, Koo Wiase. Other Ghanaian rappers – Lord Kenya, Obour, V.I.P, The Native Funk Lords (rapping mainly in Pidgin English), Castro and MzBel – continued the trend and hiplife is now one of the most popular forms of music in West Africa.

The most popular hiplife musicians are Tic Tac, Sarkodie, Vision in Progress (VIP), Asem, Obrafour, Buk Bak, Castro and Samini, who won a MOBO award for his contribution to hiplife in 2006. Since the rise of these popular musicians, hiplife has grown in popularity abroad, through such artists such as Kwaw Kesse, Koo Wiase, D-Black, Richie, ASEM, Sarkodie, Yaa pono.

The first recorded rap beef in the history of Ghana was birthed in the HipLife era when Ex doe released his controversial hit single "Maba", which was responded to by chicago with "wo bɛ kɔ". These turn of events ended up heightening tensions amongst the two rappers. Beyond that, Ex doe's maba also ended up rubbing the godfather of hiplife Reggie Rockstone the wrong way with a line in his flow that appeared to take shots at his credibility being the oseikrom president.

In 2009, Ghanaian filmmaker Mantse Aryeequaye released a documentary entitled Rhythm Rising that focused on the political history of the hiplife movement in Ghana, as well as hip-hop music amidst various political climates in the nation. In his film, Aryeequaye also examines many famed Ghanaian artists, among whom are Kwaw Kese, Kwaku Tutu and Obrafour, through their experiences within the hiplife or hip-hop movement. The film explores the culture of hiplife against the backdrop of Ghana's political environment.

Hiplife in Ghana is sticking to a new trend of rhythm and this is mainly being influenced by music engineers such as Kill Beatz, Dj Dijoe, Pie-Sie, Jay So looney, Richie, Kaywa and Hammer of The Last Two. There is some confusion about the classification of hip pop made in Ghana and Hiplife, but overall they bear the same qualities and share common rhythms.

== Musical style ==
Hiplife covers a broad range of musical styles fused together. Artists such as Samini combine reggae/dancehall/ragga scat and patois-tinged sounds of Jamaica with Akan-language lyrics over reggae rhythms fused with Ghanaian melodies. His music is branded by the general populace as hiplife. Then there are artists such as KK Fosu, Ofori Amponsah and Richie who do not rap or "DJ" as such but sing with a heavy R&B influence. Verses, bridges and choruses may be in Twi, but the structure and rhythm is typically based on American R&B. He and other similar artistes fall into the category of contemporary highlife.

The majority of hiplife is recorded in a studio environment, with heavy emphasis on computer-aided composition, arrangements and production. Hiplife artists are currently not known for using live instruments in their performances in front of audiences. Most performances are based on voicing over instrumentals and dubs on Compact Disc. This may be a leading reason why the latest incarnation of Ghanaian music has not reached the ears of World Music promoters or bridged the frontiers of countries across Africa as Congolese music has done.

Famous hiplife artists include Reggie Rockstone, Lord Kenya, Obrafour, Tinny, Tic Tac, Mzbel, Buk Bak, Batman Samini, Ayigbe Edem, Sarkodie, Castro and Okyeame Kwame. Producers include Jay Q, Appietus, Richie and Hammer of The Last Two

A pair of hiplife artists, formed a double act called Reggie 'n' Bollie and came second in the UK TV music show x-factor.

== Twi Rap ==
Though Reggie Rockstone and co have been credited for Hiplife, there has been a new development about who first recorded Twi rap. After 25 years, an obscure Ghanaian album titled Obaa Sima recently gained notoriety. The song by Ata Kak was recorded and officially released in 1994. Such an important record had been missed in Ghana's music history. Fact Magazine proclaimed it as the most important reissue of 2015. The fact was, the song was not popular until a young New York ethnomusicologist, Brian Shimkovitz, who was studying music in Ghana in the early 2000s uncovered the tape. Soon the tape had over 40 million downloads and was popular around the world without Ata Kak's knowledge, until Shimkovitz met him after more than six years.

== Hiplife Festivals ==
=== Ghana@50 in the Bronx ===
Popular music plays a large role in understanding transnational Afrodiasporic culture. Ghanaian pop culture allows Ghanaians to identify and differentiate between themselves and their culture and black American culture. There are some struggles to find where Africanness fits inside the African-American categorization. Hiplife celebrates this own unique culture within a larger, more encompassing understanding of blackness. Hiplife signifies tradition, cultural belonging, and pride. It inspires diasporas Ghanaians, for example those that attend Hiplife festivals in New York, to learn their own language and culture.

Ghana@50 specifically celebrates Ghana's 50 years of independence. Reggie Rockstone, formerly mentioned as the founder of this Hiplife genre, was intended to perform at this festival, serving as a symbol of Ghanaian culture and popular authentic music. While attempting to board the plane, Rockstone was flagged by the computer systems which delayed his trip to New York for the festival. This caused significant alarm for those planning the performance as they were expecting large crowds due to Rockstone's planned presence. A plethora of people were in attendance, primarily in cultural attire. Rockstone shot a video to explain his absence and the importance of the festival. Thankfully, Rockstone's experiences conveyed through the video allowed festival attendees to relate to one another—many in the audience had endured travel issues due to their racial and ethnic identities as Rockstone did. His absence and its cause rallied an even more significant form of community.

There was an important distinction made between the event's nature as a party—a more social event to foster connections and reminders of home—or a concert—people paying to hear a certain type of music. The intention for this event was the former, and promoters and planners desired to create community around a genre that was representative of a distinct culture, emphasizing the importance of preserving that culture.

Hiplife and this festival permitted Ghanaians to fit in within African American society while still having ties to Ghana. During hiplife concerts and festivals, there is an importance of space which allows people to completely engage in a 'full-body' experience, affected by the concert's sights and sounds.

== See also ==
- Afrobeats
- Highlife
- Hip hop music
- Raglife
