= Pae Mu Ka =

Studio album by Obrafour
- Released: November 1999
- Studio: OM Studios
- Genre: Highlife; Hip Hop
- Length: 47:50
- Producer: Yaw Anoff aka Way Deep; Hammer of The Last Two

Obrafour chronology
Pae Mu Ka (1999)	Asem Sebe (2001)

Pae Mu Ka is the debut studio album by Ghanaian musician Obrafour, released in November 1999 and recorded at CHM Studios. It features guest appearances from Cy Lover, Alhaji Flesh, Ayewa, Doctor Poh, and Funky Functure.

The album was produced by Yaw Anoff aka Way Deep and Hammer of The Last Two. The album's two major singles, "Kwame Nkrumah" and "Pae Mu Ka", covered various topics which include encouraging all Ghanaians to work for the betterment of their country.

Pae Mu Ka is considered one of the best Hiplife albums of all time, serving as a model for other hiplife rap albums to follow. The album won Obrafour rapper of the year, new artist of the year, and best hiplife song for "Pae Mu Ka" at the 2000 Ghana Music Awards.

== Background ==
After the release of Reggie Rockstone's debut album Makaa Maka, Obrafour, along with encouragement from his friends, was keen in making music a career. He was determined to make music that was in his own style. He attended various auctions and performances, where he would meet Hammer and Way Deep. They helped Obrafour gain a deal with Abraham Ohene Djan of OM Studios and in November 1999, Pae Mu Ka was released.

According to Hammer in a phone interview with Giobani Caleb in 2019, he stated that he and Way Deep didn't take a dime for producing the album, even after being asked by Obrafour about how much money they wanted exchanged.

== Lyricism and production ==
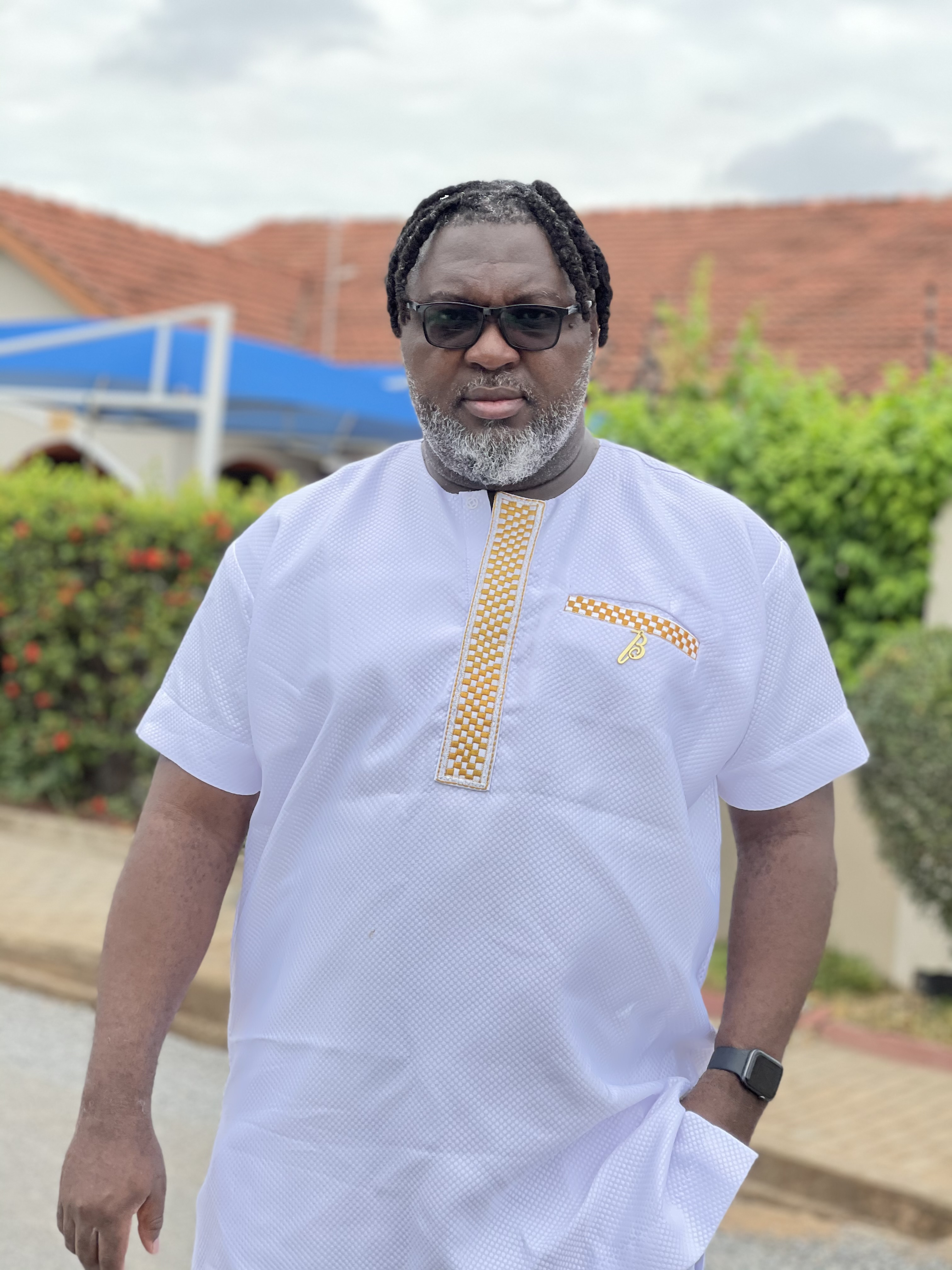
Hammer of The Last Two co-produced the whole album, in collaboration with Yaw Anoff

The opening song of the album, "Intro", is about how rap music, which was on the rise in Ghana, had come to be referred locally as Kasahare ("Kasa" meaning language and "Hare" meaning fast paced).

The seventh song on the album, "Kwame Nkrumah", acts as a prayer, using traditional speech styles commonly associated with pride and respectfulness in remembrance of the ancestors. The song is an example of how references to past styles of writing can be fitted and used in newer settings.

The album was produced by Yaw Anoff and Hammer of The Last Two. In a 2021 study, Yaw Anoff explained how the beats "were born of multiple elements" and "were inspired by [their] real lives".

== Critical reception ==
Upon release, the album was met with critical acclaim across the country, with it being considered as a breath of fresh air in the Ghanaian music scene. The album won Obrafour the rapper of the year, new artist of the year, and best hiplife song for "Pae Mu Ka" at the 2000 Ghana Music Awards.

== Legacy ==
Pae Mu Ka played a part in popularizing rap mixed with use of traditional performance in Ghana, contributing to the acceptance of the genre. The album serves as a model for hiplife rap albums.

Okra Tom Dawidi, one of many Ghanaian artists influenced by the album, recounts how the album was a source of inspiration for his musical pursuit.

That was the album that made me fall in love with hiplife. When it comes to the Pae Mu Ka album, from "Intro" to "Outro", they are all creative masterpieces. And during that time, the album was being played everywhere. A tribute song to Kwame Nkrumah, [then there was] "Yaanom" [...] the one with Cy Lover [too]—"Agorɔ No Asɔ", and [the posse cut] "Ma Mendwen Meho." [...] That album still ranks as many people's favorite.

Pure Akan (stylized as Pure AkAN), considered as many as hiplife's true purists nowadays, shares how the album had a lasting impact on him.

Pae Mu Ka was the "it" album for me, right from my first listen. I even remember how my friends and I had to save money to buy the cassette. It was the album that I could connect with and sing along to, especially since he was rapping in Twi. [...] The album influenced the sound of the time and even the way people listened to music because the lyricism on that album was truly sublime and after it came out, everything changed. My first public performance was a rendition of "Yaanom" at a friend's birthday party. I started rapping in Twi because Pae Mu Ka proved that it could be done at such a high level and the album opened an avenue for me to explore music and express myself boldly through rap.

To marked the album's 20th anniversary, on 9 November 2019, a concert were performed at Accra International Conference Centre by Obrafour, along with Reggie Rockstone, Stonebwoy, Sarkodie, Ofori Amponsah, Kofi B, Lilwin, Medikal, M.anifest, Bisa Kdei, Ras Kuuku, EL, Wendy Shay, Strongman, Edem, Tic (the "c" stylized in all caps), Efya and King Promise.

A documentary centered around the album and Obrafour's journey in the music industry was announced by Hammer, set to premiere in Silverbird Cinemas, Accra on September 27, 2019, but was postponed and eventually suspended due to production issues. A novel is also in the works in honour of Pae Mu Ka.

== Track listing ==
Track listing for Pae Mu Ka
No.	Title	Length
1.	"Intro"	2:46
2.	"Pae Mu Ka"	4:43
3.	"Agoro No Aso" (featuring Cy Lover)	5:15
4.	"Ma Mendwen Meho" (featuring Alhaji Flesh, Ayewa, Cy Lover, Doctor Poh, and Funky Functure)	4:49
5.	"Konkonsa" (featuring Adjoa and Doctor Poh)	5:07
6.	"Yaanom"	4:40
7.	"Kwame Nkrumah"	4:39
8.	"Ad3n"	5:52
9.	"Agoro No Aso" (original)	5:37
10.	"Outro"	4:17
Total length:		47:50

== Work cited ==
- Dzitrie, E.; Agbemava, X. (14 November 2021). "Kasahare: Demystifying Rap Lyricism and Artistry in Ghana's Hiplife Music". Popular Music and Society. 45 (2). Taylor & Francis: 202–220. doi:10.1080/03007766.2021.1991173. hdl:10067/1840190151162165141.
