= Tinny (musician) =

Ghanaian rapper

- Tinny in 2012

Background information
- Born: Nii Addo Quaynor; 19 January 1982 (age 44)
- Origin: Accra, Ghana
- Genres: R&B, hiplife, hip hop
- Occupation: Rapper
- Years active: 1994–present
- Label: Kankpe Records

Nii Addo Quaynor (born 19 January 1982), better known by his stage name Tinny, is a Ghanaian rapper. At age eight, by singing and rapping at parties and funfairs, he got into the music industry. In 1994, he started performing at Fun-World, an entertainment program that was organized every Sunday at the National Theatre (Accra). He has released five studio albums since his debut.

== Early life ==
Tinny was born Tinny Nii Addo Quaynor in Osu, Ghana to Ricky Tetteh Quaynor and Naa Badu Quaynor. He is the last born of their six children. Tinny grew up in the neighborhood of Osu and La, both in Accra, Ghana.

Tinny had his primary education at the Osu Home School and then went to Hepter International School at Akim Oda. He went to Osu Salem JSS and then to Okuapeman School for his secondary education. He was the entertainment prefect at Okuapeman School and he organized shows for the students, as well as performed for them.

== Music career ==
=== 1994-1998: From Black Nature to Nature and Agony ===
In his early years, Tinny took up his first stage name Black Nature. He performed at various entertainment shows with that name. While he was in Osu Salem JSS, he joined forces with two of his friends, Salam and Buke, who called themselves "Black Agony" as a duo, and formed a whole new group called "Nature and Agony". This group was managed by Tinny's father, Ricky Tetteh Quaynor. They performed at by then very popular teenage music shows such as Kiddafest and Fun-World. However, Agony did not like the idea of Tinny's father managing them thus, they left the group. Tinny then went solo to perform at ‘Ecstasy Promotions’ where he chalked the 1st position. When he got to Okuapeman Secondary School, his dad booked sessions for him with Hammer of The Last Two which landed him into being part of the Last 2 family as a 'foot soldier'.

=== Road to debut - Makola Kwakwe ===
It was quite difficult for Tinny to come out since most hiplife artists at the time sang and rapped in Twi and Tinny on the other hand, was a native Ga speaker and was therefore fixed on rapping in his Ga language. His dream of making it to the top of the hiplife ladder came true when Hammer of The Last Two secured a deal for him with Abraham Ohene-Djan (CEO of OM Studios). Abraham was carried away by his impressive lyrical flow after listening to his album, and he agreed to produce him. With a beat maker like Hammer at the helm of things, Nii Addo decided to use the name Tinny as his stage name because it was his real name and blasted onto the Ghanaian music scene in 2003 with ‘Makola Kwakwe’. He quickly became a sensation, gracing events and dominating radio and TV in his category. Tinny's fame increased when he was featured on the remix of ‘Oye Ohene’. He went on with his career and featured artists like Paa Dogo, Obrafour, K.K. Fosu, Etuoaboba, Bandana, FBS and Okra. He contributed Obrafour's Execution Diary with his voice on a track called I Believe I Can Fly (Heko Ejorko). Tinny won several awards following his debut like the New Artiste of the Year at both Ghana Music Awards 2004 and Ghana Music Awards UK 2004 and a Youth Excellence award for being the ‘Youth Musician of the Year 2003’. He was also awarded for being the Best Guest Entertainment Musical Artist by Great Lamptey Mills.

In 2007, Tinny was picked by MTV to have his video for 'Incomplete' shot by world-renowned director Rachel Watanabe-Batton. This track was taken from his Aletse Ogboo album. In 2008, Tinny had the chance to record a single with Ja Rule when Ja Rule was in Ghana to perform during the 2008 Ghana Music Awards.

Since his debut he has maintained his position as an A-list artiste in Ghana, and as kept his name on top of the music charts.

== Style ==
He is known for performing in Ga, a local dialect, and frequently incorporates Ga proverbs into his lyrics. His style is characterized by rhythmic delivery and rhyme-based flow, which has contributed to his recognition among younger audiences and Ga-speaking listeners.

“Ricky, Naa Badu, Nakutso Bi,” a popular line in most of his songs, confirms the support he receives from his parents Ricky Tetteh Quaynor and Christie–Lee Naa Badu Quaynor.

== Campaigns ==
=== Cadbury fairtrade campaign & Zingolo ===
Cadbury launched a campaign using Ghanaian traditional culture to raise additional funds for cocoa growing communities. The campaign was a promotion for Tinny's track Zingolo, as well as the Ghana-based dance troupe High Spirits. The Zingolo single is available on iTunes, with proceeds going to CARE, which funds education in Ghana's cocoa growing communities. The move follows the recent certification of Cadbury Dairy Milk across the UK and Ireland and builds on the work of the Cadbury Cocoa Partnership, a 10-year initiative launched in 2008.

The Zingolo campaign was developed at Fallon, London, by executive creative director Richard Flintham, creative directors Chris Bovill, John Allison, creatives Filip Tyden, Dan Watts, Chris Bovill, John Allison, account director Nathalie Clarke, agency strategist Tom Goodwin, executive producer Nicky Barnes and agency producer Gemma Knight.

The song, "Zingolo", was released on the newly established record label Glass and a Half Full Records, established by Cadbury's Dairy Milk following their move to fairtrade chocolate. The song, and the record label, were also set up to celebrate "all things Ghana, its people, its rappers, its dancers, its cultural figures and, of course, its cocoa beans"

The advertisement was broadcast on television and cinema. Featuring a 1-minute edit of the song, it is a short music video showing Ghana and a "cocoa head". It is their fourth advertisement in the Glass and a Half Full Productions campaign, which began in 2007 with the award-winning Gorilla advertisement.

=== Mytinny – Contribution campaign ===
On 2 January 2007, he organized and performed two songs at his grand New Year's party for 300 HIV/AIDS orphaned children at Manya-krobo in the eastern region of Ghana to mark the beginning of his “Mytinny – Contribution Campaign” which he says would be his Annual Social Responsibility Project.

In January 2012 Tinny, as a former student of Okuapeman, visited the school to celebrate his birthday with the blind students with the aim of putting smiles on their faces.

The items donated included food and drinks, talking calculators, and 51 packets of Braille sheets.

The birthday party was organized by Hear Our Say Ghana, an Accra-based Non-Governmental Organization with support from Akua Pokua and Arisa, volunteers from Belgium and Japan respectively. Richard Berko, Tinny's manager told BEATWAVES that students always looked up to them as their source of encouragement. 'I think most of us are in a position to help them and that is exactly what Tinny has done'. Speaking to the children, Tinny encouraged them to learn extra hard to become influential people in society, despite the poor conditions they found themselves in now. According to Tinny, he was concerned about the children's well-being, hence his visit.

=== Glo Ghana ambassador ===
In 2009, Tinny was listed as one of Glo Ghana's ambassadora.

== BET Cypher ==
BET Hip Hop Awards Ghana Cypher 2010 was created exclusively for BET International. It Features D-Black, Sarkodie, Kwaku-T, Ayigbe Edem, BabyG, Tinny and Reggie Rockstone. Its beat was produced by Green Gafacci from Black Avenue Muzik, and Produced & Directed by Lilian N. Blankson for Princess Productions.

== Discography ==
- Makola Kwakwe (2003)
- Aletse (2005)
- Kaa Bu Ame (2007)
- Attention (2008)
- Regular Champion : Vol 1 (2013)

== Awards and nominations ==
Year	Organisation	Award	Work	Result
2004	Youth Excellence Awards	Young Musician of the Year	Himself	Won
2004	Ghana Music Awards	New Artiste of the Year	Himself	Won
2004	Ghana Music Awards (UK Version)	New Artiste of the Year	Himself	Won
2004	Channel O Music Video Awards	Best African West Award	Dzormo	Nominated
2008	Ghana Music Awards	Hiplife Song of the Year	Kaa Bu Ame	Nominated
2008	Ghana Music Awards	Hiplife Artiste of the Year	Himself	Nominated
2008	Ghana Music Awards	Hiplife Album of the Year	Kaa Bu Ame	Nominated
2009	Hip Hop World Awards	African Artiste of the Year	Himself	Won
2009	4syte Music Video Awards	Best Male Video	Ringtone	Nominated
2009	Ghana Music Awards	Best Collaboration of the Year (Shared with Czar and Richie)	Mercy Lokko	Nominated
2009	Ghana Music Awards	Best Collaboration of the Year (Shared with Slim Busterr)	Nhyira	Nominated
2010	Ghana Music Awards	Hip Hop /Hiplife song of the Year	Ringtone	Nominated
2010	Ghana Music Awards	Hip Hop /Hiplife Artiste of the Year	Himself	Nominated
2010	Ghana Music Awards	Best Rapper of the Year	Himself	Nominated
2010	MOBO Awards	Best African Act	Himself	Nominated
2011	4syte Music Video Awards	Best Collaboration (Shared with Jay Ghartey)	Go Hard All Day	Nominated
2011	Ghana Hiphop & R&B Awards	Hiphop Album (Of The Decade)	Makola Kwakwe	Nominated
2012	4syte Music Video Awards	Best Male Video	Anaconda	Nominated
2012	Queen of The Ga-Adangbe Beauty Pageant and Awards	Ga-Adangbe Icon of the Decade	Himself	Won
2012	Yfm Loud in GH Awards	Best Male Artiste	Himself	Nominated
