= Gh hip-hop =

Genre of hip hop music

Gh hiphop
- Stylistic origins: Hip hop
- Cultural origins: Late 1990s, Ghana

Gh hip hop, Gh rap or Ghana hip hop is a hip hop genre, subculture and art movement that developed in Ghana during the late 1990s. The hip-hop genre came into existence in Ghana through Reggie Rockstone, who is known as the hip-life father, and other notable musicians such as Jayso and Ball J. It first came to Ghana as Hiplife, where Reggie Rockstone introduced a fusion of hip-hop beats with African sounds to create a whole new genre.

Hiplife is different from Western hip hop because it involves local dialects such as Twi, Ga, Ewe, Hausa and Ghanaian Pidgin English. Some hip-hop musicians in the early era were Reggie Rockstone, Kae Sun, Sway DeSafo, Samini, Okyeame Kwame, Bradez, Buk Bak, D-Black, Sarkodie, Tic Tac, Obrafour, 4x4, Kwaw Kese, Ayigbe Edem and upcoming artists such as Lil Shaker, Bra Kevin, Rayoe, Yaa Pono, Loone, Asem, and EL. Some songs from this era of hip hop were Asabone, Eye Mo De Anaa, and you no get money.

== Hip hop evolution ==
Fast forward twenty-four years, and hip hop evolved into a more diverse and trendy culture where festivals like the Chale Wote Street Art Festival were a means by which the culture was made widespread. This brought about groups such as yoyo tinz which promoted Ghanaian hip hop through TV shows and documentaries. This also brought about the induction of "Kasahari" which is a twi word meaning "Fast Talk" and is mostly associated with musicians that rap fast. This was a term given to musicians who rapped very fast while using the local dialect known as twi. Some products of Kasahari include Sarkodie and Obrafour.

== Hip hop today ==
Hip hop in Ghana experienced some tensions between two well-known rappers namely Sarkodie and M.anifest This conflict came into existence when Sarkodie in a song titled Bossy, used a popular phrase of Manifest and this sparked tensions between them. Manifest reacted to this by doing a song titled the godMc and this tension continued.

Hip hop in Ghana has been taken over now by the "new school" with acts such as Patapaa, Pappy Kojo, Joey B, La meme gang, Big Ghun, Amerado, B4bonah, teephlow, Kojo Cue, Lil shaker, R2bees and Kwesi Arthur.

Since 2020, a drill rap scene has emerged in the city of Kumasi. Inspired by American drill music, it is known locally as asakaa, and its prominent artists include rapper Yaw Tog.
