= Paa Dogo =

Ghanaian rapper

- Born: Takyi Raymond Kwaku; 19 October 1983 (age 43); Accra, Ghana
- Genre: hip-life
- Occupation: Rapper
- Instrument: Vocals
- Years active: 2000–present

Paa Dogo is a Ghanaian rapper. His debut album, Dogo The Album, was released in 2001. He is known for songs including "Osumafour (Mmonto)", "Medo No" and "Tykun", and has worked with musicians such as Obrafour, Tinny and Okyeame Kwame.

== Career ==
In a 2021 interview, Paa Dogo discussed his break from music and his plans of returning. He said that he had taken time away from music to attend to his family and preferred to release new material when he felt it met his standards.

Paa Dogo is often cited as an example of a rapper who incorporates Ewe-language phraseology into verses performed in Asante Twi.

In February 2023, Paa Dogo announced a 17-track second album titled The Genesis, which he intended to be his final album..He is a former member of Hammer's Last Two Music Group.
