= Ball J =

Ghanaian rapper and sound engineer

- Also known as: Ball J Beat
- Born: Albert Serebo Ayeh-Hanson; 8 November 1984 (age 41); Accra, Ghana
- Genres: Hip hop
- Occupations: Rapper; Sound Engineer; Record producer; Entrepreneur
- Instruments: Vocals; Sampler
- Years active: 2006–present
- Labels: Platinum Management (current); 7Digits (former); Nu Afrika Records (owner); Skillions (former)

Albert Serebo Ayeh-Hanson (born 8 November 1984), known by his stage name Ball J or Ball J Beat, is a Ghanaian rapper, sound engineer, record producer and entrepreneur from Accra. He spent most of his formative years in the U.S. State of California. Ball J is the CEO and founder of Nu Afrika Records. He is currently signed to Platinum Management, an American record label and the brand ambassador to Roca Bella Brands.

Ball J was a pioneering member of the Skillions Records when it began on the campus of Presbyterian Boys' Senior High School–Legon (PRESEC). He worked together with Jayso, the label's founder and formed a genre which they called GH Rap (hip hop made in Ghana).

Besides being a rapper, Ball J is also one of the best hip hop, hiplife and azonto sound engineers in Africa with Weiyɛ Ball J Beat (this is Ball J's beat) as his signature. He was nominated for Best Producer of the year in Ghana Music Awards 2015. He holds a degree in Business Management from the University of Professional Studies (UPS). Ball J is the only Ghanaian record producer on Patoranking's debut studio album "God Over Everything", producing Patoranking; the first track on the album.

== Early life and career ==
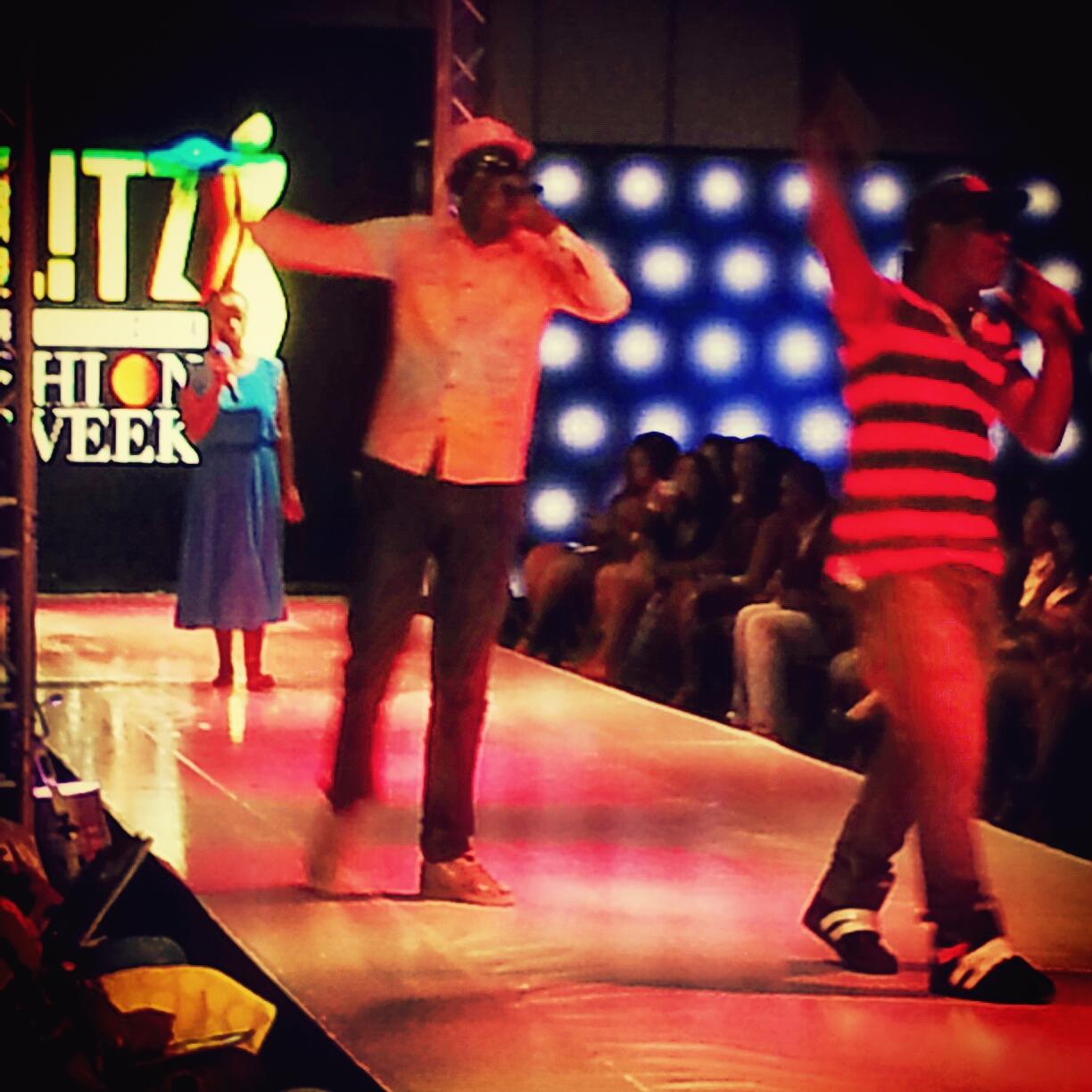
Ball J with his manager Maron Wullar performing at GLITZ Africa Fashion Week 2011, Accra

Albert Hanson or Nana Serebo, also known in the music industry as Ball J, was born in Adabraka in the Greater Accra Region of Ghana, on 8 November 1984. He spent most of his formative years in California–United States. He gained his basic education at North Ridge Lyceum at Kanda. He then went to Presbyterian Boys' Senior High School–Legon (PRESEC) for his high school education where he joined a Hip Hop group called 'Skillions', of which he was an active member. After High School, he furthered his education to study Software Programming and Computer networking at Atlantis Computers, Asylum Down–Accra. He then went to the University of Professional Studies (UPS) to pursue a degree in Business Management. Despite his busy schedules on campus, he was still committed 'Skillions' being present for shows, productions and meetings. Music was a natural thing for him as he spent hours listening to his father play music.

Ball J classifies himself as a Hip hop rapper. The rapper's musical lifestyle was influenced by several artists such as Jay Z, Nas, Mase, The Notorious B.I.G and Eminem. Not only is he known in Ghana as Ball J or Ball J Beat, but some also call him Ghana's Jay Z because he sounds like Jay Z when he raps. According to Ball J, he had no choice but to learn beat making since there were no particular institutions in Ghana that focused entirely on Hip hop music production to produce the kind of beats he needed as a Hip hop artist. After School, Ball J decided to have a full-time career in music production with the aim of making Hip hop for himself. Around 2006, Ball J started making beats and demo records in his room with his close friends. He then formed Nu Afrika Records. Around 2008, he decided he needed to be more serious and make masters. He then had to rely on books and seek advice from pioneers in music production such as Kwame Twum, a former bass guitarist for the legendary Kojo Antwi. He consulted Hubert who is also well acclaimed and good in sound mixing and mastering. Ball J also trained with a bass guitarists friend, who had a studio in Lapaz–Accra. All this time, he was studying the general understanding of music production such as the dynamics, compressions and mastering. While learning the trade, he made his first professional hit "Temperature" which featured some of his friends who were part of the Nu Afrika Records; Shao Qan, Krynkman and Screech. He had a few challenges becoming an artist and a music producer. Some of these challenges were the fact that Ghanaians were not much into Hip hop songs. Hit songs in Ghana are mostly songs you can dance to (e.g. Hiplife and Azonto), so this made it very difficult for Hip hop artist such as himself to make a hit song in Ghana. Without forgetting about hip hop, Ball J started fusing his hip hop style of beatmaking with faster beats, which was purposely to fulfill the demands of artists coming to his studio, (Nu Afrika Records). His first significant hit which he produced was Kwawkese's Killa Bewu Last Show in 2010. After that, Ball J produced a lot of songs for both the underground and known artists, but his major milestone was Lapaz Toyota by Guru. The song put Guru on the map in a big way, and significantly improved Ball J's music studio business. As the song blew up, all kinds of artists came to Ball J in the hopes of reproducing Lapaz Toyota's success.

He then started working with artists like Kojo Antwi, Guru, Obour [the current president of the Musicians Union of Ghana (MUSIGA)], Tic Tac, Sarkodie, Kwawkese, Stay Jay, Gasmilla, Okra, Nhyiraba Kojo, Obrafour, Castro and the list goes on. Since then, he has been recognized as one of the best music producers in Ghana, with songs like Lapaz Toyota, Let Me Do My Thing, Twaa Me Lala, Non-fa, Innit, Masa I Beg, Pooley and many more as his claim to fame; making hits in Ghana and the world at large. Ball J was nominated for the Best Producer of the year in the Ghana Music Awards. On 21 December 2012, Ball J released his first Hip hop single "All Eyes On You" from his upcoming album "Home and Away" which received credible response and airplay from both Africa and the Western. The 29 March 2013, Good Friday, saw the release of an Afrobeats/Azonto song called "Togo Bikini". He Co-Produced Kwasese's new hit single Yakubu which features Sarkodie and he himself. "Weiyɛ Ball J Beat" (this is Ball J's beat) is his signature phrase which is now a household name.

=== 2016: Okumoo ===
On 15 April 2016, Ball J released a standalone afrobeats single Okumoo.

=== 2016: Big Six (Debut Album) ===
On 6 June 2016, Nu Afrika Records released Ball J's first studio album "Big Six". The album has six songs in total as in its name and features only three Ghanaian artiste; Choirmaster, Sarkodie and Stonebwoy all on one track "Poolside Jam". "Big Six" album is currently on 37 online digital stores for Digital download and Streaming.

=== 2017: Game Of Thrones ===
Ball J released a single inspired by the famous TV series Game of Thrones and titled it accordingly. The single also contains samples of the series’ soundtracks over Hip hop drums which was written and produced by Ball J himself. Using Tywin Lannister's everlasting line "Any man who must say ‘I am the King’ is no true king" as hook. Ball J talks about the delusional kings of Hip hop in Africa. The record does not only appreciate the TV show, it also draws some attention to the Ghanaian music industry, specifically tackling issues facing the battle for the rap king in Ghana.

In recent times, rappers from the Hip hop fraternity in Ghana have fought for the title of rap kingship with some calling themselves "King", "Best African Rapper", "GodMc", and "A king without a crown", among others. Ball J calls himself the ‘best in Africa’.

Game of Thrones was released under the rapper's Nu Afrika Records imprint. The official video was shot in documentary style and also featuring scenes from the popular series, the video was directed by Malik Ofori of MO Films.

== Musical style ==
Ball J is regarded as one of the best rappers in Africa when it comes to hip hop music. Most of his songs online are freestyles, what he calls unwritten freestyle. Ball J has contributed to the Ghana Music Industry, he can be named among top 10 famous Ghanaians who made the Azonto genre and dance popular worldwide.

== Personal life ==
Ball J comes from a family of five; his mother Beatrice Richardson and his father Emmanuel Ayeh-Hanson (late). He has two siblings; Norris Nii Noi Ayeh-Hanson (brother) and Nancy Nana Atei Ayeh-Hanson (sister).

== Entrepreneur ==
=== Nu Afrika Records ===
Nu Afrika Records was founded by Ball J in the early 2006. Nu Afrika Records is an artist management and recording studio located in Spintex–Accra. For more than a decade now, they have been producing, recording and managing most of Ghana's prominent Hiplife and Hip hop musicians like Guru, Kwawkese, Ntelabi, Nhyiraba Kojo, Sarkodie etc. Nu Afrika stands for New (Nu) Africa (Afrika). Most songs produced by Ball J or owned by the record label has the phrase "Take Y'all To Nu Afrika" at the beginning or at the end of the song. The record label has Ball J the owner of the label signed to its credit. It also has a video editing, graphic designing and production house called 36 Men and Two Radio Shows, The World African Show and Rap360 airing online and on radio respectively. Nu Afrika Records is also an event organizing and promotions company.

==== The Nu Afrika Hip Hop Cypher ====
The Nu Afrika Hip hop Cypher Volume 1 was one of Ghana's first if not the first cypher's to be recorded in Ghana. It was recorded in 2007. Ball J was able to put together a lot of Ghana's top rappers and underground rappers on the cypher. The cypher is in two different versions; the English version and the Twi version. The full English version is about 24 minutes long and the full Twi version is about 23 minutes long. On 4 January 2014, Ball J released short versions for both the English and Twi cypher. Both the full English version and the full Twi version are yet to be released.

=== Advertisement and voice over ===
Amongst Ball J's numerous talents is his voice with which he does Radio and Television commercials, Jingles and all forms of advertisements including branding of products, goods and services. For example, Joy FM's famous radio jingle "Joy 99 point 7" was made by Ball J, another famous radio jingle mad by him is OK FM's "This is OK Fm" or "OK FM! 101 point 7". Almost all jingles on Green FM Ghana was made by him. The following are some of the multimedia company / companies Ball J has worked with; Hot FM, Live FM, Radio Universe, UTV, The Spirited Actor, General Motors Ghana, Kalypo, Y Fm, L.G, Happy Fm, E.tv Ghana, Reality Shows etc. Ball J is currently working with Mr Ivan Quashigah; director for the popular TV series "Things We Do For Love" and "YOLO".

=== MTN Hitmaker TV Show ===
Torgbe of Nu Afrika Records taking his award for winning MTN Hitmaker 3, National Theatre

The MTN Hitmaker is an original talent hunt reality show opened to Ghanaians who believe they are bound to be Hitmakers. MTN Hitmaker strives to discover and nurture the great creative potential in Ghana. The ultimate winner of the MTN Hitmaker show wins GH¢100,000 recording deal. Ball J was selected as one of the music producers/sound engineers for the MTN Hit Maker reality show since the show began during the later part of 2012. Togbe, winner of the Hitmaker Season 3 was from the camp of Nu Afrika Records. He walked away with the prize of GH¢100,000 record deal when he emerged as the winner for season 3. Because he was once an artiste of Nu Afrka Record, Ball J was his sound engineer. His debut track Number 9 (produced by Ball J) which featured hiplife heavyweight Kwawkese was released a few months ago and is steadily climbing the charts.

Year	Show	Season	Sound Engineer	Artist	Result
2014	MTN Hitmaker	3	Ball J	Torgbe	Won

== Skillions Records ==
Skillions started as a rap group in 1999 with Jayso and T-Kube, both classmates in Senior High School. After T-Kube left Ghana for the United Kingdom in 2000, Jayso began recruiting young rappers and singers like himself. For Jayso, the dream was to create an empire; a force that will take over the entire Ghanaian Music Scene.

By 2001, The Skillions consisted of Jayso, Ball J and Jinx Therapy (now Frank P).

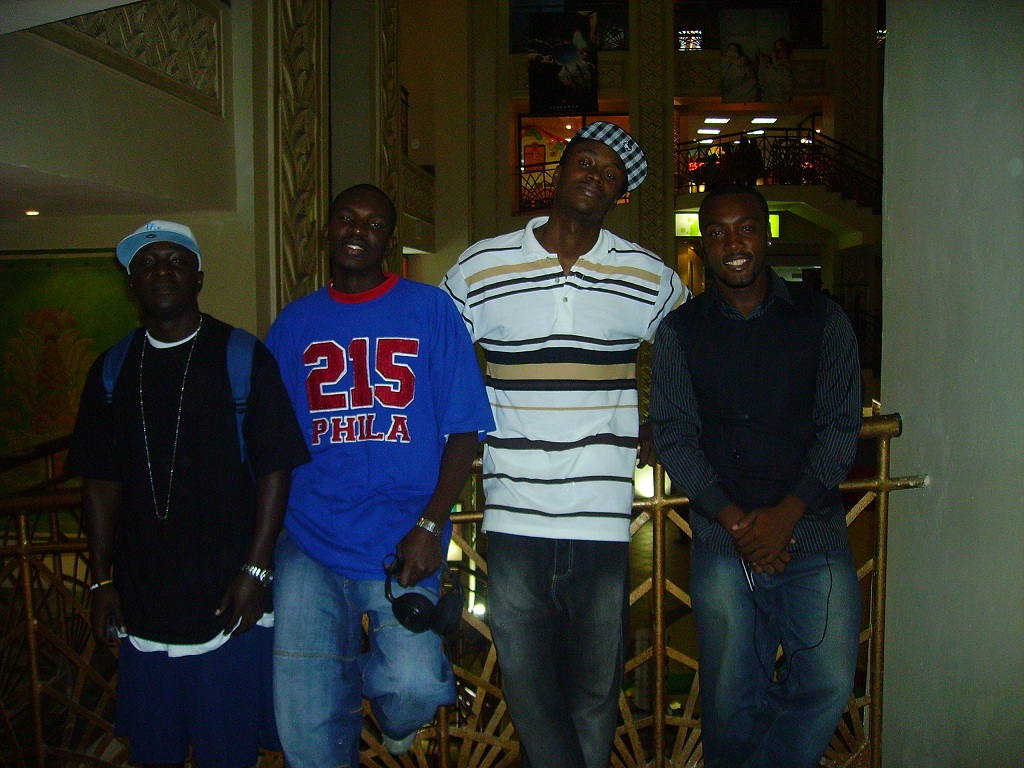
Jayso, Ball J, EL and J-Town

Jayso later joined the Haatsville Music Group led by Kwame Barfour Osei popularly known as Kobi Onyame.

The Skillions continued to make music together with Haatsville, and Jayso continued to recruit talent to ensure the dream was kept alive. EL, J-Town, Midknight, KP and Sandyswiz joined the Skillions between 2002 and 2005. The group worked on the first ever Hip Hop mixtape to come out of Ghana. The 21 track Mixtape did extremely well and provided a platform for each Skillions Member to showcase their versatility.

After the mixtape, the Skillions members decided to pursue solo careers. Jayso went ahead to use his newly gained platform to help younger upcoming artists to also achieve their dreams. He formed the New Generation Skillions, which consisted of Lil'Shaker, Bra Kevinbeats, Joey B, Grafik, Killmatic, Paapa, Rumor, Noble, Padlock, The Third and Gemini. The New Generation Skillions worked on their mixtape and it was a major success under the Skillions umbrella and Ebuzu Media Services. Some members of the New Generation also pursued solo careers after the mixtape.

Skillions New Generation with Jayso

Over the past few years, Skillions has gone through some major changes and most of the old members have moved on to pursue solo careers. Ball J started Nu Afrika Records EL started GH Productions and is now signed to BBnZ Live, J-town signed to Killa1west, Jinx is unsigned, NKP quit rap, Midknight is in Atlanta, Grafik left, Joey B and Gemini signed to Hammer's Last Two, Kevinbeats signed to Cryme Records and Killmatic is signed to Duncwills Entertainment.

Currently, Skillions is no longer just a group, but a Record Company.

== Discography ==
=== Selected singles ===
Year	Title	Producer(s)	Ref
2009	Temperature by Nu Afrika Records	Ball J	
2011	Take My Letter Away (featuring Kojo Antwi)	Ball J	
2013	Coco Beach	Ball J	
2013	All Eyes On You	Ball J	
2016	Okumoo	Ball J	
2017	Game Of Thrones	Ball J	
2017	Accra	Ball J	
2019	Papa No Nie (featuring Dahill & Hxncho)	Ball J	
2020	Lullaby	Fortune Dane	
2020	Nana Aba	Mr Hanson	

=== Selected songs featured on ===
Year	Title	Producer(s)	Ref
2014	Mr Lover Lover by Kwawkese	Coptic	
2015	Yakubu by Kwawkese (featuring Ball J & Sarkodie)	Ball J & Skonti	
2015	Katiboom by Kwawkese (featuring Ball J, Pappy Kojo, Yaa Pono & Medikal)	Ball J	

=== Selected songs produced and mastered by Ball J ===
Year	Title	Artiste	Producer(s)	Ref
2009	What's Up New York	Yaa Pono	Ball J	
2010	Killer Bewu Last Show	Kwawkese	Ball J	
2011	Lapaz Toyota	Guru	Ball J	
2011	Twame La La	Stay J	Ball J	
2012	Let Me Do My Thing	Kwawkese	Ball J	
2012	Innit	Gasmilla	Ball J	
2012	Kareoke	Guru	Ball J	
2012	Fano Saa	Castro	Ball J	
2012	Kwatrikwa	Praye	Ball J	
2012	Survival (featuring Stonebyow)	Fiifi Selah	Ball J	
2012	Carry Dey Go (featuring EL)	Greenfield	Ball J	
2012	One People (featuring R2Bees)	Obour	Ball J	
2012	Chilling	T-Blaze	Ball J	
2013	NonFa	Mr Hmhmm	Ball J	
2013	Wo Fi Te Mo Lɛ (featuring Double)	Pope Skiny	Ball J	
2013	Vampire	Tictac	Ball J	
2013	Come See For Ghana	King Ayisoba	Ball J	
2013	Ayalolo (featuring Screwface)	Nhyiraba Kojo	Ball J	
2014	Pooley	Guru	Ball J	
2014	Pressure Pump (featuring Joey B)	Kwawkese	Ball J	
2014	Yaayi (featuring Keche)	Nhyiraba Kojo	Ball J	
2014	Obunsam (featuring Obrafuor)	Kwawkese	Ball J	
2014	Bossu	Guru	Ball J	
2015	Masa I Beg (featuring Ike Wonder)	Kwawkese	Ball J	
2015	Nyame Be Tua Wo Ka	Guru	Ball J	
2015	Baba God (featuring Ike Wonder)	Guru	Ball J	
2015	Wonohard (featuring Ball J)	Konfi	Ball J	
2016	Patoranking	Patoranking	Ball J	
2016	Are You Aware	Guru	Ball J	
2017	Fok Dem Neggas	Kwawkese	Ball J	
2017	Katiboom	Kwawkese (featuring Ball J, Pappy Kojo, Yaa Pono & Medikal)	Ball J	

Additional sources:

=== Selected songs co-produced by Ball J ===
Year	Title	Ref
2015	Yakubu by Kwawkese (featuring Ball J & Sarkodie)	

=== Selected songs mastered by Ball J ===
Year	Title	Ref
2014	Pooley Swag	
2015	Yakubu by Kwawkese (featuring Ball J & Sarkodie)	

=== Freestyle songs and covers ===
Year	Cover Title	Original Song By	Ref
2010	No Afraid	Eminem	
2013	Open Letter	Jay Z	
2014	They Don't Love You No More	DJ Khaled	
2014	Hammer Freestyle	Hammer	
2015	CMM (Count My Mistakes)	—N/a	
2016	Figure It Out	French Montana	

== Videography ==
Year	Title	Director	Ref
2010	Temperature	Phamous Philms	
2014	They Don't Love You No More	Malik Ofori	
2014	Mr Lover Lover (as a featured artiste)	Prince Dovlo	
2015	Yakubu (as a featured artiste)	Prince Dovlo	
2016	I Am That I Am	Kenn Ayiah	
2017	Game Of Thrones	Malik Ofori	

== Awards and nominations ==
Year	Awards	Category	Nominated work	Result	Ref
2010	4syte Music Video Awards	Best Special Effects Video Of The Year	Temperature by Nu Afrika Records	Nominated	
2011	4syte Music Video Awards	Best Hip Hop Video Of The Year	Ya Tiatia by Nu Afrika Records	Nominated	
2011	4syte Music Video Awards	Best Special Effect Video Of The Year	Ya Tiatia by Nu Afrika Records	Nominated	
2015	Ghana Music Awards	Best Producer Of The Year	Pooley by Guru	Nominated	
2019	GAMA	Best Producer of the year	Ball J	Won	
