= Opanka =

Ghanaian rapper & performer

- Also known as: Dadie Opanka, M.A, Microphone Abuser
- Born: Armstrong Affum
- Origin: Ghana
- Genres: Hiphop, Afrobeats
- Occupation: Rapper
- Years active: 2009–present
- Label: Opanka Army

Armstrong Affum, known by the stage name Opanka or Dadie Opanka is a Ghanaian rapper and performer from Tema. He gained popularity with a freestyle he performed on the hit song "Simple" by Bradez. He later released his first single, "Taste," which was critical acclaimed.

== Discography ==
=== Selected singles ===
- Hajia ft Jaguar
- Eka Aba Fie ft. Shatta Wale
- Abuburo Nkosua ft. Empress Gifty
- Wedding Car
- Mabre Agu ft. Ben Brako
- Taste
- Sure ft. Adina
- No Dropping ft. Kwaw Kese
- Awoof Apae ft 4x4
- Weekend
- Hallelujah ft Keche
- Mepe No Saa ft Okyeame Kwame
- As a featured artist:
- Kwaw Kese - Popping ft Opanka
- Amerado - Yi Wani ft. Opanka
- Shatta Wale - Understand ft. Opanka
- Seshi - The Definition ft. Yaa Pono, Jayso, Sarkodie, Edem, Opanka, Kofi Kinaata

==== Albums ====
- Akwaaba
- Born Again
- Elevation

== Awards and nominations ==
Year	Ceremony	Award	Nominated work	Result	Ref
2012	Ghana Music Awards	Hiphop Song Of The Year	Popping	Won	
2018	Ghana Music Awards	Best Music Video Of The Year	Wedding Car	Nominated	
