= Okra Tom Dawidi =

Ghanaian hiplife artist and rapper

- Also known as: Da Kasaharilist
- Born: Emmanuel Ralph Kotei Nikoi; 16 December 1984 (age 41); Accra
- Genre: Hiplife
- Occupation: rapper
- Instrument: Vocals
- Years active: (2003–present)

Emmanuel Ralph Kotei Nikoi (born 16 December 1984), known by the stage name Okra Tom Dawidi or Da Kasaharilist, is a Ghanaian hiplife musician, best known for his debut hit single “Ayekoo”, which features Obrafour and Tinny.

== Early life and education ==
Okra, the third of three children, was born in La, Accra on 16 December 1984 to Mrs. Grace Kaaley Amarh, a trader, and Mr. Vincent Nikoi Kotey, former chief supply officer of the Electoral Commission of Ghana. He attended St. John's Preparatory and Junior High school in Achimota. He then proceeded to the Accra Technical Training Center. Okra Tom had always wanted to be an engineer and a professional musician.

== Music career ==
Okra Tom Dawidi was first introduced to Hammer of the Last Two by a friend, where the two worked on songs such as Ayekoo, Donto among others. He was featured on the Execution Diary album in 2003. He is noted for his unique style of storytelling.

He has collaborated with several artistes, such as Sarkodie, Kwaw Kese, Tinny, Obrafour, Kwabena Kwabena, Reggie Rockstone among others. Okra has constantly been featured in the Ghanaian animated series, Tales of Nazir.

== Videography ==
Year	Title	Director	Ref
2003	Ayekoo ft. Tinny, Obrafour	Emklan Media Productions	
2008	Kosoa ft. Kwaw Kese, Jagoo	Solid Multimedia	
2017	Fitem ft. Sarkodie	Louicage	

== Discography ==
=== Singles ===
Year	Title	Producer	Ref
2003	Ayekoo ft. Tinny, Obrafour	Hammer of The Last Two	
2004	Agyinamoa Kwesi	Hammer of The Last Two	
2008	Kosoa ft. Kwaw Kese, Jagoo	Jayso	
2016	You No Get Money feat. Reggie Rockstone	Richie Mensah	
2017	Fitem ft. Sarkodie	Nshorna Music	
