= Zingolo =

2009 single by Tinny

- Agency: Fallon
- Client: Cadbury's
- Language: English
- Running time: 60 seconds
- Product: Cadbury's Dairy Milk
- Release date: 18 September 2009 (television)
- Music by: Tinny ("Zingolo")
- Starring: Tinny
- Country: United Kingdom
- Preceded by: Eyebrows
- Followed by: Record Shop

"Zingolo"

Single by Tinny

from the album Big Swap Songs
- Released: September 2009
- Recorded: 2009
- Genre: African music
- Length: 4:59 (full-length); 1:01 (advertisement edit)
- Label: A Glass and a Half Full Records

Tinny singles chronology
| "Zingolo" (2009) | ""Pencil Full of Lead" (with Paolo Nutini)" (2010) |

"Zingolo" is the name of both a television advertisement for Cadbury's Dairy Milk in the UK in September 2009, and a single by Tinny released the same month, which features in the advertisement.

The song, "Zingolo", was released on the newly established record label Glass and a Half Full Records, established by Cadbury's Dairy Milk following their move to Fairtrade chocolate. The song, and the record label, were also set up to celebrate "all things Ghana, its people, its rappers, its dancers, its cultural figures and, of course, its cocoa beans" Although featuring a range of musicians, it is credited to a single artist, Tinny, from the label.

The advertisement was broadcast on television and cinema. Featuring a 1-minute edit of the song, it is a short music video showing Ghana and a "cocoa head". It is the fourth advertisement in the Glass and a Half Full Productions campaign, which began in 2007 with the award-winning Gorilla advertisement.
