= Hammer of The Last Two =

Ghanaian music producer and entrepreneur (born 1977)

Hammer Of The Last Two
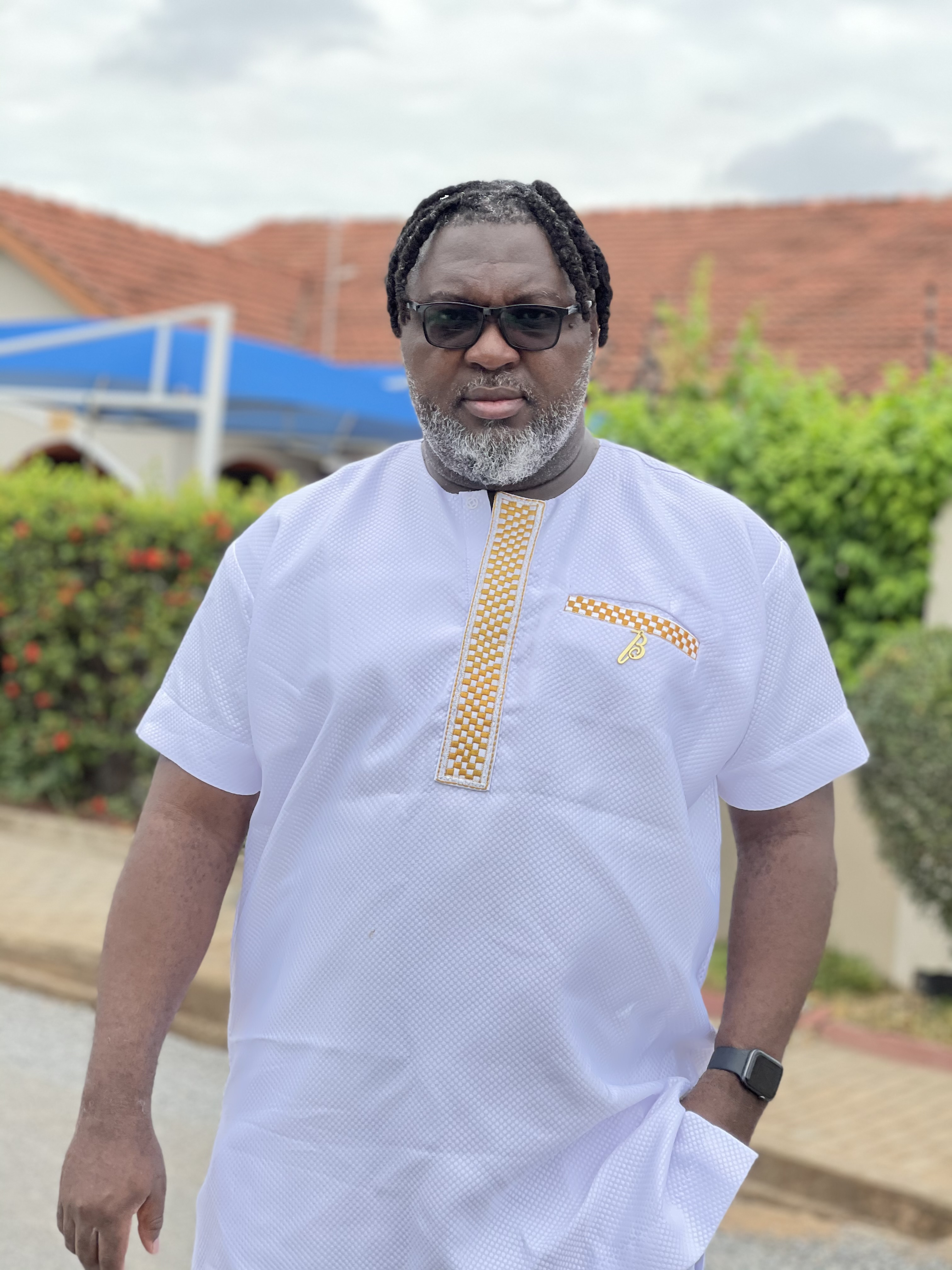

Background information
- Also known as: Hammer; Tony Starks
- Born: Edward Nana Poku Osei; 27 March 1977 (age 49); Accra, Ghana
- Origin: Mampong Ashanti, Ghana
- Genres: Hip hop, hiplife
- Occupation: Record producer
- Years active: 1999–present
- Label: The Last Two Music Group
- Website: thelast2music.com facebook.com/hammer.last2

Edward Nana Poku Osei known by the showbiz name Hammer of The Last Two (born March 27, 1977) is a Ghanaian record producer. He is the founder and CEO of The Last Two Music Group and known for growing Ghanaian Hip Hop or Hiplife artists, including Obrafour, Tinny, Kwaw Kese, Sarkodie, Ayigbe Edem, among others. He is sometimes credited as one of the people in the popularization of Hiplife or Hip Hop made in Ghana.

== Early life ==
=== Growing up ===
He is the third child of Jones A. Osei and Marian Osei. Hammer was born Edward Nana Poku Osei on 27 March 1976. His father was a banker and his mother was in the fishing industry. They both had six children consisting of three boys and three girls, in order, Albert Osei, Angela Osei, Edward Osei, Elizane Osei, Karen Osei and Jones Osei jnr. He is also a descendant of the late Otumfour Opoku Ware II, one time King of the Asanti Region. The family lived in North Kaneshie and later moved to East Legon, a wealthy neighborhood in the capital in the late 1980s and presently as well. Hammer attended Yellow Duckling nursery school, St Theresa's School, Achimota Primary School and finally the Presbyterian Boys' Secondary School, Legon. However, his passion for music became a distraction from active academics and so he could not further his education to the university level. Occasionally in his adolescent, the family lived in the United Kingdom and he also lived in the United States during his late teens. Although his father was heartbroken as Hammer's grades fell, the family realized he was a born musician and eventually supported him. Hammer was known to drum on any surface available to him anywhere he found himself and was also known to patrol his neighborhood with a boom box sound system while playing loud music with friends.

=== Inspiration ===
Growing up on his father's musical collection (such as Bonny M, the Bee Gees, Led Zeppelin, The Rolling Stones, Pavarotti, Bonnie Tyler and several television and movie theme instrumentals such as James Bond, Dynasty, Neighbours, Dallas, etc.), Hammer digested works from these great icons as early as age seven and this gave him an unusual perspective over his peers. This equipped him with skills that would eventually shape up his musical career. After the hip-hop revolution, Hammer then became a fan of Special Ed, A Tribe called Quest, EPMD, De La Soul, Craig Mack, Guru, Rakim, Das Efx, Jay-Z, Dr. Dre, etc. But his real inspiration came from Osibisa, Quincy Jones and Bob Marley. Hammer is known to be a very reserved person and avoids nightclubs, parties and other social gatherings. The name "Hammer" initially came from a mock performance of MC Hammer’s "Here comes the Hammer" back in school as a fresher but now the Hammer name is related to the raging heavy drums associated with his music production. Hammer lives a simple life far from the celebrated person he is. Fans have credited him for being very down-to-earth.

== Career ==
=== Obrafour ===
In 1997, as the young Hammer and Way Deep, collectively known as The Last Two, started their music production career, a friend (Edward Adu Mensah) introduced them to Obrafour, a potential rapper with unusual singing abilities and after vigorous grooming from Hammer, his debut album produced by Hammer and Way Deep was released on the Home Base Record label owned by Daniel "Masoul" Adjei and was later managed by Noise Management, owned by Abraham Ohene-Djan in August 1999. After Obrafour's album, Way Deep left for the USA and Hammer continued producing in Ghana but the two have remained best friends and still keep in constant touch. Obrafour has remained a multi award winner to date at the Ghana Music Awards and other parts of Africa.

=== Tinny ===
Tinny was also a full beneficiary of Hammer's grooming and entire production which earned him a classic for a debut album. In order to reduce the risk of the release of Tinny who was emerging with the Ga language, very unpopular then in the music industry, Hammer decided to feature him on Obrafour's third album hit single "Oye ohene" remix, which shot Tinny up to stardom even before his debut was released. There was also a dispute between Hammer and Tinny during the recording of his maiden album called Makola Kwakwe. Apparently, Tinny was caught up in the Twi revolution and despite being a Ga, he wanted to force himself to rap in Twi because of a wider market. Hammer however believed Tinny would popularize the Ga language in the industry and would not allow him to rap in Twi as he believed Tinny would be ousted by the Twi-speaking rappers. The issue was settled finally as Tinny’s family agreed that the Ga language should dominate the album with snippets of Twi and the result was a pride for the Ga people and a number one spot for Tinny. He went on to win several awards at the Ghana Music Awards in subsequent years and other awards in parts of Africa.

=== Kwaw Kese ===
In 2004, Hammer took up yet another challenge with an artist called Kwaw Kese, an indigene of the ‘Fante’ language who hailed from Agona Swedru in the Central Region. Kwaw Kese came to the capital purposely to look for Hammer through one of Hammer's artistes “Dogo”and upon his first audition, Hammer confirmed his potential and started grooming him. Within three months of training, Hammer released a single, ‘oye nonsense’ from him which immediately made him eligible for concerts and appearances. Demand for this artist was so high that Hammer had to release the second single ‘kwakwa” which certified Kwaw Kese as the best ‘Fante’ rapper Ghana had ever seen. His debut album however was delayed until the following year and in the 2007/2008 Ghana Music Awards, Kwaw Kese went on to win about seven awards.

=== Edem ===
In 2005, Hammer got married and had his first child. He eventually took a break from production for more than two years until the middle of 2007 when he took up the project of yet another artist from another part of the country. This artist, Ayigbe Edem, was introduced to Hammer two years earlier by Jay Foley, an advertising agency owner who used to be a production student of Hammer back in 2002. Edem's potential was obvious from the word go and Hammer started grooming him immediately. The result was the landmark album titled ‘The Volta Regime’ which immediately put the Volta Region on the Ghanaian hip hop musical map. The album earned Ayigbe Edem seven nominations with one win at the 2010 Ghana Music Awards. Edem is still recording his second album and lives away from the noise of the city in the outskirts of the capital Accra.

=== Sarkodie ===
During the recording of The Volta Regime album in 2009, a young potential rapper named Sarkodie approached Hammer for a recording deal. After auditioning, Hammer branded Sarkodie as a rap encyclopedia due to the various styles he could conjure on impulse. He then tagged Sarkodie as a special case and encouraged him to master one particular style of his which was tongue twisting. This artist also proved himself to be the only local rapper with the ability to freestyle off the head with intelligent rhymes mixed with logic. Hammer did not want to waste time on Sarkodie so he quickly signed him for a five-year contract and created spaces on two of Ayigbe Edem’s songs ("u dey craze" and "give it up") to introduce him before the recording of his debut album. However, after the release of Ayigbe Edem’s album, Sarkodie’s demand soared and the promotion of Ayigbe Edem’s album seemed to conflict with the timing of the recording of Sarkodie’s album. This resulted in a dispute that could have delayed Sarkodie’s recording. Hammer later agreed to let Sarkodie go as he wanted to focus all attention on Edem at the time. Sarkodie moved on to win the Artiste of the year 2010 at the 2010 Ghana Music Awards with his debut. Relationship between Hammer and Sarkodie was never affected by this as Sarkodie went on to name his album ‘makye’ which was given to him by Hammer upon their first meeting. Their latest project "Saa Okodie No", which was produced by Hammer was recently aired on 106 & Park and contributed to Sarkodie's nomination at the recent BET Awards 2012 where he won the Best International Act.

=== Smokey Beatz ===
In 2022, Hammer announced the signing of a young producer who goes by the name Smokey Beatz.

=== Offcamp production ===
Hammer is also responsible for the big break of New York based Ghanaian Hip-hop artist Blitz the Ambassador, when he featured Blitz on a couple of his productions like Deeba, and Obrafour's ("who born u by mistake"). In between the recordings of Hammer's groomed iconic artists, he was occasionally contracted by executive producers to produce two or three songs on various albums of artists such as Deeba, Jay Dee, Joe Frasier, KK Fosu, Okyeame Kwame, Kwabena Kwabena and several others. These songs were produced by Hammer outside The Last Two camp.

== Summary ==
=== The Last Two ===
Hammer began his career in music accidentally, when a friend of his (Yaw Opare Anoff, aka Way Deep), a gifted keyboardist at the time encouraged him to take up the career because he realized Hammer had the ability to dissect and analyze music in the most unusual ways as a professional does. He also had the habit of finding faults with world-class professional music which he thought could be better. This friend and Hammer then formed a production unit called The Last Two, meaning the only two left to put Ghana on the world map musically. Together they produced an album for a young artist called Obrafour which became the highest selling Hiplife album in Ghana. This album was called Pae Mu Ka. Way Deep, however, left for the United States while Hammer remained as "one of the two" left alone with the task of fulfilling the dream of two. Hammer however decided to maintain the name The Last Two as a tribute to his friendship with Way Deep.

=== Liberating the Tribes in Hip Hop ===
After Obrafour's album, Hammer took up a new dream to spread Hiplife or Hip Hop in Ghana through all dialects instead of the stereotypical Akan language, which was and still is the most popular language in the country. After Obrafour (who rapped in the Twi dialect, typical of the Ashanti people), he challenged himself by risking the production of albums in other unpopular dialects, musically and made history again with the recording of Tinny, who raps in the Ga language, typical of the people of the Greater Accra Region of Ghana. He went down in history as the bestselling Ga act to date. He then challenged himself again with Kwaw Kese ending up as the biggest Fante act to date. The Fante language is typical of the indigenes of the Central Region and parts of the Western Region of Ghana. The story followed with Ayigbe Edem adding to Hammer's credit as the biggest Ewe rapper to date. The Ewe language is the mother tongue of the Volta Region of Ghana and neighbouring Togo and Benin.

=== Compilation Albums and Movie Scores ===
Hammer has also released compilation albums, spotlighting the work of lesser-known artists. The compilation albums include Execution Diary (2003) in partnership with Obrafour, Sounds of Our Time (2004), The Crusade of the Lost Files (2006) and the ongoing Evolution Recruits. Hammer has also composed movie scores, including the American movie Bloody Street.

== Discography ==
Studio albums

- 2003: The Execution Diary
- 2004: Sounds Of Our Time
- 2006: The Crusade Of The Lost Files
- 2016: The Last Of A Dying Breed

== Personal life ==
In 2005, Hammer married Lydia Konadu Boateng. They were, however, divorced a year later. They had one child, Mary-Ann Nana Yaa Osei. In another relationship with television presenter Nana Aba Asante, two children (Edward Nana Poku Osei Jnr and Andrew Nana Kojo Osei) were born. This relationship did not end in marriage. At a press conference for one of his artists, Hammer was arrested for failing to appear in court on delay of child support maintenance payments. It is not clear which of the women caused the arrest but upon arrival at the police station with his lawyer, Nana Asante Bedi Otuo, the arrest was reversed and he was asked to appear in court on the next assigned date. Hammer currently lives in his retreat home in the outskirts of Accra, where he is working on his new compilation album as well as new artists Agyekum and Joey B. Hammer is also the current national director of Hiplife at MUSIGA (the Musicians Union of Ghana).

== Health ==
He was claimed to have survived the COVID-19 pandemic after he was admitted to Bemuah Royal Hospital in East Legon following fever for some days. He was in the hospital for a month.

== See also ==
- Ghanaian hip hop
