= Nikoi =

Nikoi may refer to:

- Amon Nikoi (1930–2002), a Ghanaian economist, diplomat and central banker
- Ashie Nikoi (died 1963), a Ghanaian politician and Pan-African activist
- Emmanuel Ralph Kotei Nikoi (born 1984), known by the stage name Okra Tom Dawidi, a Ghanaian hiplife musician
- Gloria Amon Nikoi, a Ghanaian politician born in 1930
- Nikoi Island, Indonesia
