= Edem (rapper) =

Ghanaian musician (born 1986)

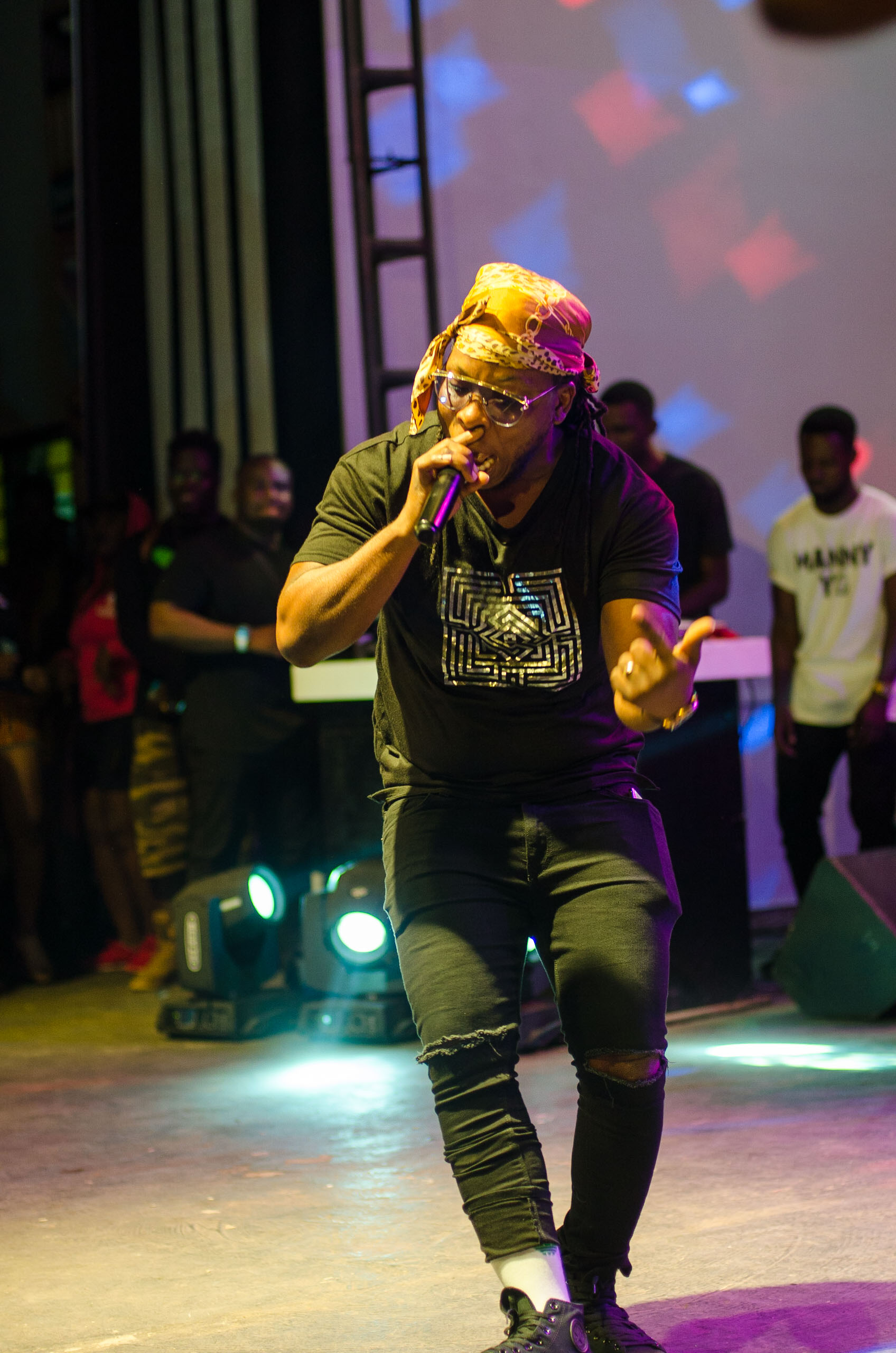
- Edem performs at a concert.

Background information
- Also known as: Go Get'em
- Born: Denning Edem Hotor; May 20, 1986 (age 40); Dzodze, Volta Region, Ghana
- Genres: Afrobeats, Hip hop, Reggae, Dance Hall
- Occupations: Rapper, Singer Executive producer, Entrepreneur with net worth $18million, Singer
- Instrument: Vocals
- Years active: 2009–present
- Label: Volta Regime Music Group
- Website: Official website

Denning Edem Hotor (born May 20, 1986) is a Ghanaian recording artist and entertainer who performs under the mononymous name Edem. In 2015, he was awarded Best International Act-Africa at the Black Canadian Awards in Canada.

== Early life ==
Edem hails from Dzogadze, a small town in Abor, in the Volta Region of Ghana. Edem is the only son of his parents two children. He has a sister called, Wendy Sefakor Agbeviadey who resides in Accra. Edem spent most of his youth in Accra and Aflao. He completed his primary and Junior High education at the Amazing Love International Schools. He attended Bishop Herman College for his senior high school education. At age 13, Edem lost his mother, leaving him with his lawyer father and sister. His father also died when Edem was 16. He grew up surrounded by music, ranging from hip hop to dancehall, reggae and highlife.

At age 9, Edem's love for music was apparent as he was often seen tapping on tables, empty cans and any item that could produce good rhythm. He joined his first music group in Junior Secondary School. At Secondary School, he formed a 6-member group called the Ringmasters. They performed at the school as well as at funfairs elsewhere. After completing school, he pursued a commercial career, recording in underground with artists including Kokromoti, Nival, Trigmatic, Vyroz, M.O.B and Osibo.

== Music ==
Edem appeared on Voice of America where he talked about his "Nyedzilo" video, which features Mavin Records' Reekado Banks, and his videos such as "The One", featuring Sway that talks about Africa's liberation and his award-winning song Koene previously featured on Music Time Africa by Heather Maxwell and Vincent Makori.

In 2006, he released his first radio hit single "Witine Woshi", which translates as "we came and they ran". It gained much popularity in his region and added to his underground reputation. That year, he got together officially with The Last Two Entertainment Group, headed by the hit maker Hammer of The Last Two. This label is responsible for artists including Obrafour in 1999, Tinny, Kwaw Kesse in 2005.

Edem appeared at live shows such as the opening act for the John Legend concert at the International Conference Center in Accra in 2007. Before his debut album, he collaborated with other acts such as Obrafour.

After two years in the studio (2006 December to 2008 December), he came up with his first single "Bougez". It received airplay across the country. His first album featured new as well as established acts such as Tinny, Kwaw Kese, Sarkodie, Obour, Asem, K. k. Fosu, Tuba, Samini, Jayso, Trigmatic, El and Gemini.

Edem appeared on shows such as Stars of the Future Season 3 Finales, Ghana Music Awards (2009) and all major university concerts. He has been a part of the University of Ghana's Commonwealth Hall week, Akuafo Hall week, Evandy Hostel(Legon) week celebration, Pentagon Hostel week celebration, Miss WA Poly, Miss Ho Poly, KNUST's Unity Hall week celebration and University Of Cape Coast's Kwame Nkrumah Hall Week 2013.

=== Debut album: Volta Regime (2009) ===
His Debut Album The Volta regime was released in January 2009.

This album is a result of two years of recordings in Accra. All the lyrics were written by Edem. The compositions were produced by Hammer of The Last Two who doubled as the executive producer.

=== Second album: Mass Production (2011) ===
Mass Production was to be a transition from his first. The album, he said, holds a mixture of unique beats produced by various engineers including Hammer. Edem says, "...It basically is a transition from me being an artiste with a first album and now trying to put music out that will be appealing to everybody that has supported me. Now the album is Mass Production because it is going to be made easily available and affordable to everybody in a sphere of life in the country." In an interview with Peacefmonline.com, Edem disclosed that his favorite song on the album is "Kate" the only track produced by Hammer of The Last Two. "Anytime I hear that song it reminds me of my beginning", he said. On why he decided to drop Ayigbe from his name, he said "This has nothing to do with image crisis."

"The intention of Volta Regime’ as an album was to make a statement for my region to be respected...this statement was to make everybody know that you can use your dialect and sell anywhere across the world and in doing that I wanted to also make sure the people from my region take pride when they are derogatorily called Ayigbe people or anything."

"Two years along the line after executing ‘Volta Regime’, I know a lot of people who take pride in the name now", he explained. He said the purpose of using Ayigbe has been fulfilled hence his decision to stick to only Edem which is still an Ewe name.

His videos include "Delaila" ft M.I, "The One remix" ft Sway, "Only in Ghana", "Wicked" and "Bad" ft Coded (4x4), Koene, "Over Again remix" and "Not on my level (heyba)", which featured on BET 106 &Park, ChannelOTV and TraceTv. "Not on My Level? reached 49th position on Reflexfm Urban top100 chart in the Netherlands.

=== Books & Rhymes ===
His next album was Books & Rhymes.

== EP release 2020 ==
In 2020, he announced the release of a six-track audio-visual EP, titled 'Mood Swings' expected to come out on July 24, 2020. He dedicates the EP to his mother who died while He was a teenager.

== Recognition ==
Edem won the Best International Act-Africa at the 2015 Black Canadian Awards. He beat Mafikizolo (South Africa), Yemi Alade (Nigeria), Davido (Nigeria), Eddy Kenzo (Uganda), Oritse Femi (Nigeria), and Teeyah (Ivory Coast) to win the award.

Edem won 2015 Vodafone Ghana Music Awards Album of the Year Books and Rhymes, Afropop song of the year with "Koene" and Video of the Year with "The One" video featuring SwayUk.

He topped the 2014 4syte TV Music Video Awards with 3 awards for Best Directed, Best Photography and Most Outstanding Video for "The One" featuring SwayUK directed by Gyo Gyimah. When the nominations list for the 2010 Ghana Music Awards was released, Edem's maiden album had earned seven nominations.

== Philanthropic ==
Edem offered various items and a cash amount to the maternity ward of the Mamobi Polyclinic in Accra in September 2009. After hearing Father Campbell, the priest in charge of the Weija Leprosarium calling for help, Edem donated some items and money to the Weija Leprosarium on 10 October 2009 and in the spirit of charity, he offered items and a cash amount.

Edem made a donation to the parents of Michelle Koranteng, a 4-month-old baby who was suffering from a congenital brain disorder. He also made a donation to the maternity ward of the Hohoe General Hospital and called on the government to do more to reduce malaria.

== Personal life ==
Edem started music in high school where he formed a 6-member group called Ringmasters, he is the only son to his parents who are both dead. Edem rose to fame in 2006 with his first hit single "WOTOME WOSHI" and he got signed to The Last Two Entertainment Group that same year. In February 2011, the rapper became a father after the birth of his daughter and claimed to be in a committed relationship with marriage plans. He is married with two children.

== List of awards ==
=== WatsUp TV Africa Music Video Awards ===
Year	Nominee / work	Award	Result	Ref
2016	Nyedzilo	African Video of the Year	Nominated	
2016	Nyedzilo	Best African Combo Video	Nominated	
2016	Nyedzilo	Best African Dance Video	Nominated	

== Discography ==
- The Story of Efo Kodjo
- Nyedzilo
- Kpordawoe
- The One
- Koene
- Wicked and Bad
- Ohene
- Gogaga
- Bakowa Bani
- Angels and Demons
- Zero to Hero
- I Am Blessed
- March
- Delaila
- February
- Weed and Liquor
- Girlfriend
- Badder dan dem
- Best Rapper
- January
- Latex
- Go Harder
- Koowa da Koowa
- City Gyal
- Give it 2 me
- Sika ye moya
- Belembe
- Ghetto Arise
- Love jeje
- Heyba
- Ø The Volta Regime
- Bougez
- Bra fremi fremi
- Give it up
- Nyornuviade
- Emmre sesa
- De afor tome
- Lorlortor
- Menye wokoe
- Je, tempri
- Lorm nava
- Books and Rhymes
