= Kofi B =

Ghanaian highlife musician (died 2020)

- Birth name: Kofi Boakye Yiadom
- Died: February 2, 2020; Cape Coast, Central Region, Ghana
- Genres: Hiplife, Highlife
- Occupation: Singer-songwriter
- Years active: 2000–2020
- Labels: Akwaaba Music, D&C Ghana, Tams Records

Kofi Boakye Yiadom (died February 2, 2020), known by his stage name Kofi B, was a Ghanaian highlife musician. He was known for songs such as "Mmobrowa", "Bantama Kofi Boakye" and "Koforidua Flowers", among others. He was inspired by the likes of Amakye Dede, Kojo Antwi and Ofori Amponsah.

== Education ==
Kofi B attended Agogo State College in the Ashanti Region, but dropped out prematurely due to financial difficulties.

== Death ==
Kofi B suffered a heart attack prior to performing at a concert in Cape Coast on February 2, 2020, and was pronounced dead on arrival after being rushed to a hospital. He had been battling health issues over the past year.

== Discography ==
- Taxi Driver
- Twa Me Keke
- Aserewa
- The Return of Kofi B
- Afia Donkor
- Brenya
- Bantama Kwasi Boakye
