= Heather Maxwell =

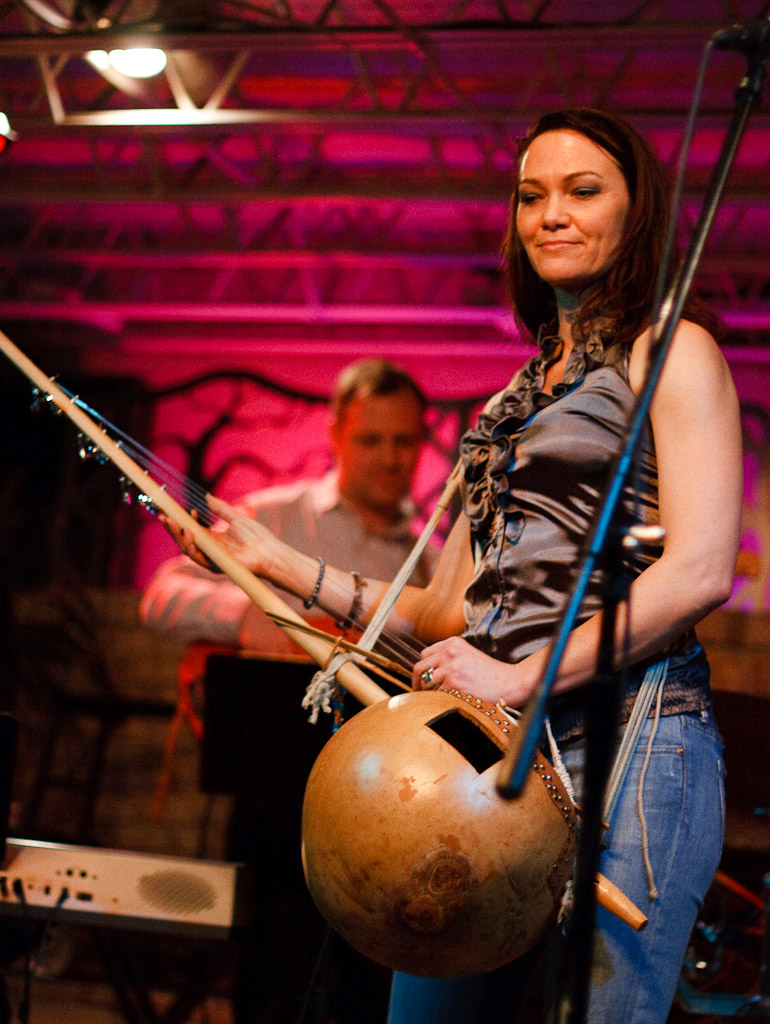
- Maxwell with Inner Rhythm at Gravity Lounge

Background information
- Born: September 12, 1965 (age 60); Flint, Michigan
- Genres: Malian, jazz, world, AfroPop, R&B, alternative rock
- Occupations: Singer, songwriter
- Instruments: Kamalen n'goni, balafon, percussion, piano
- Years active: 1990–present
- Labels: Samassa, Random Chance, EMI
- Website: heathermaxwellmusic.com

Heather Maxwell is an American singer-songwriter and radio host for Voice of America. She sings jazz standards and composes original works on piano, kamalen n'goni, balafon, and percussion. Heather produces and hosts the radio and TV program Music Time in Africa for the Voice of America.

== History ==
Maxwell was born Flint, Michigan and began singing at age 7 with her family's gospel band. She studied music and anthropology at Interlochen Arts Academy and University of Michigan, and African music at University of Ghana - West Africa.

From 1989 to 1991 Maxwell was a Peace Corps volunteer in a rural village in Mali. She spent time in Paris and Abidjan recording and performing with African musicians. From 1995 to 2003 she earned her master's degree and Ph.D. in ethnomusicology at Indiana University. Maxwell taught ethnomusicology at the University of Virginia. She also toured and recorded with jazz drummer Robert Jospé and with her own group Afrika Soul.

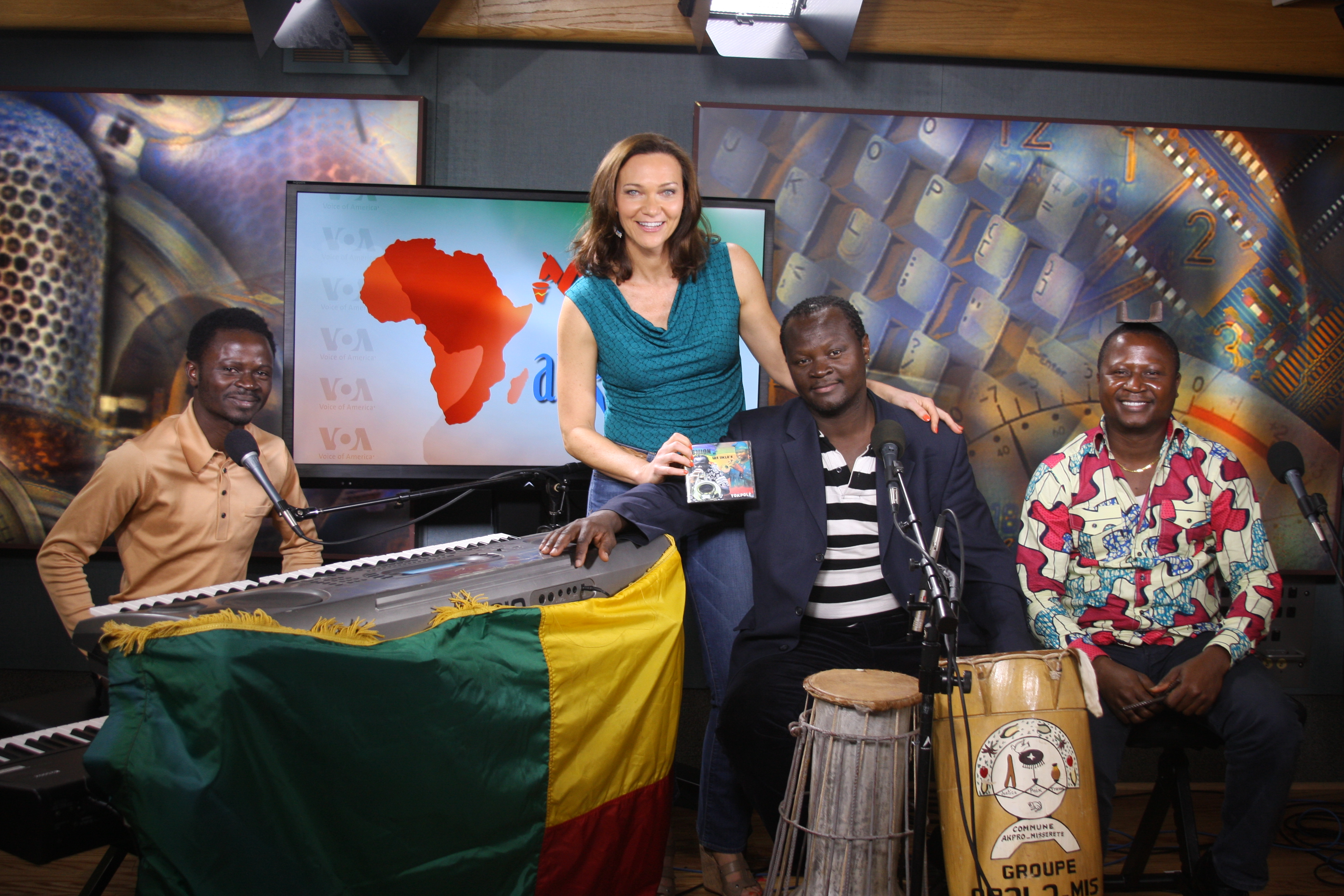
Maxwell interviewing a musical group from Benin on Voice of America

In 2011 Maxwell returned to Mali as a Fulbright Scholar for a teaching stint in Bamako at the National Conservatory of Music. The coup d'état on March 22, 2012, cut that short and she returned to the US. Later that year Heather joined the Voice of America in Washington, D.C., as host and producer of the worldwide radio program Music Time in Africa.

== Discography ==
- 1991 Keneya Ji Samasa Records, Mali
- 1992 Pygmee by Group Worro, EMI/Pathé Marconi, Studio JBZ, Abidjan
- 2006 Heartbeat by Robert Jospé's Inner Rhythm, Random Chance Records
- 2008 Inner Rhythm Now by Robert Jospé's Inner Rhythm
- 2010 Afrika Soul, Jesuno Baby Productions
- 2014 "Mango Tree" (single) Jesuno Baby Productions
- 2015 "All of Me" (single) Jesuno Baby Productions
- 2016 "Abiro" (single) with Winyo, Jesuno Baby Productions
- 2017 "Cry Me a River" (single), Jesuno Baby Productions
- 2019 "My Light" (single), Jesuno Baby Productions
