= Eyebrows (advertisement) =

- Directed by: Tom Kuntz
- Written by: Nils-Petter Lovgren
- Distributed by: Cadbury plc
- Release date: 23 January 2009
- Running time: 1 minute
- Country: United Kingdom
- Language: English

Eyebrows is a British television advertisement launched by Cadbury plc in 2009 to promote their Dairy Milk-brand chocolate.

The advert features two children, a boy (Bradley Ford) and a girl (Georgia Wake), sitting in front of a grey backdrop at a photographer's studio. When the photographer leaves the shot to answer the telephone, the boy presses a button on his watch, at which point "Don't Stop The Rock" by Freestyle begins to play. The children begin to move their eyebrows up and down to the beat of the song. Throughout the song, the children move their heads from to left to right, up and down staring into a number of cameras, as they continue to move their eyebrows. Towards the end of the advert, the girl begins to release air from a pink balloon in time with the music, producing effects similar to scratching a vinyl record. The end of the advert displays a bar of Cadbury Dairy Milk Chocolate above the slogan of the campaign: "A Glass and A Half Full of Joy".

The advert was written by creative director Nils-Petter Lovgren at Fallon and directed by Tom Kuntz.

It has been reported on in numerous news media and blogs and resulted in many people doing eyebrow dances in YouTube videos and parodied in television programmes including The Sunday Night Project, with Lily Allen playing the part of the boy, while puppet doppelgängers of Wayne Rooney and Sven-Göran Eriksson did their version on an episode of Setanta Sports' Special 1 TV.

The Daily Telegraph newspaper reported: "The one-minute film for Cadbury's Dairy Milk chocolate is thought to have been viewed more than four million times on YouTube and similar sites in its first three weeks. It is twice the number of viewings racked up at the same stage by the firm's previous cult clip, in which a gorilla plays drums to Phil Collins' "In the Air Tonight"."

The advert is part of an advertising campaign from Cadbury to promote Dairy Milk including the previously mentioned gorilla advert and one of trucks drag racing down an airport runway.

== Accolades ==
| Creator | Country | Accolade | Year | Rank |
|---|---|---|---|---|
| ITV | United Kingdom | Ad of the Decade | 2009 | 19 |
