= Abraham Ohene-Djan =

Ghanaian cinematographer (born 1974)

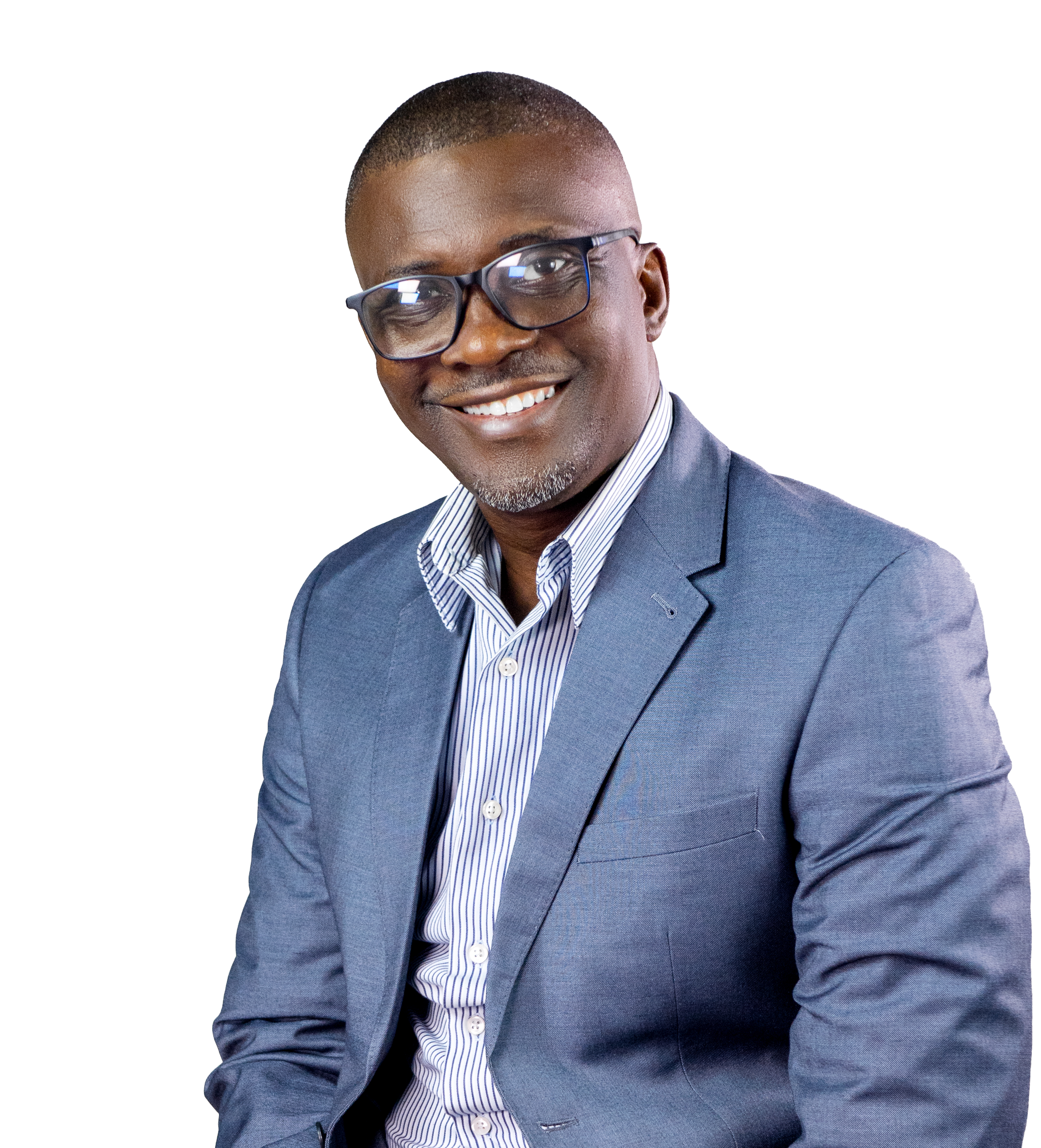
- Born: Abraham Ohene-Djan; Kumasi, Ghana
- Occupations: Producer, director, media professional
- Years active: 1993-present
- Television: Hiplife Rewind (Documentary) - BBC Africa
- Website: abrahamohenedjan.com

Abraham Ohene-Djan, is a British/Ghanaian producer, director and media professional. He is the founder and chief executive officer of Ohenemedia, OM Studios and Si-Fex Digital, where he produces and directs hiplife music videos, commercials, television programmes and documentaries and is recognized for shooting the first hiplife music videos.

== Early life ==
Abraham Ohene-Djan was born in Kumasi in 1974. He moved with his family to the UK in the early 1980s; initially settled in Westminster and later moved to North London, where he attended Finchley Catholic High School. He went to university in the United Kingdom.

== Career ==
In 1996, Ohene-Djan founded Si-fex Digital in Ghana, where he produced and shot commercials, documentaries, TV programmes, and music videos for highlife and hiplife artists.

In 2009, Ohene-Djan struck a deal with Wilson Author to establish a music channel on his Skyy Television terrestrial Digital Network, The Station, which became the first 24-hour music and lifestyle channel to play 100% Ghanaian content. The channel later became part of the GoTV network and, a few years later, progressed onto the DSTV network, making its content available Africa-wide. In 2017, FiestaGH was purchased by the EIB Network.

In 2013, Ohenemedia and FiestaGH were selected as official Google Africa Partner; at a time when YouTube monetization wasn't officially available to Ghanaians, Ohenemedia/FiestaGh and Pidgin Music were offered the opportunity to monetise content for local musicians and promote YouTube and drive content creation in Ghana. After an initial period, YouTube allowed individuals to monetise their content locally.

== Projects ==
In 2004, following the launch of the Nescafe African Revelation program, Ohene-Djan's OM Studios worked as a collaborative partner, producing all audio visual materials and television programs for nine participating countries.

In 2012, Ohene-Djan directed and shot a tribute video in honor of Ghana's late President, John Atta Mills, who died after an illness. The video, titled Yedi Awereho, featured artists including Rex Omar, Amakye Dede, Kojo Antwi, Samini, Obour, Okyeame Kwame, Blakk Rasta, Stephanie Benson, Shee, DSP Kofi Sarpong, Cecilia Marfo, Kontihene, Kofi B, A. B. Crentsil, No Tribe and Nacee.

Ohene-Djan was director of Lynx Entertainment, a Ghanaian record label, from 2009 to 2022.

From 2011 to 2015, he was a member of the Ghana Music Awards board.

In 2020, Ohene-Djan contested Reggie Rockstone's assertion of being the originator of hiplife, arguing that it is the beat that truly defines a genre. He believes that the genre is shaped by the engineer, not by a specific subject or style of rapper or singer. According to him, Reggie Rockstone's claim is inaccurate, and he suggests that producer Zapp Mallet is more fittingly considered the originator of hiplife. Rockstone consistently asserts himself as the true originator of hiplife, dismissing any dissenting opinions as falsehoods.

In a collaboration between YouTube and Ohene-Djan to curate a playlist of Ghanaian songs for the platform, music producer Kwame Micky accused Ohene-Djan of exploiting the musicians whose songs were included. Kwame Micky alleged that royalties from the agreement were intended for the featured musicians, but Ohene-Djan allegedly failed to distribute these earnings, using them for personal benefit instead. Ohene-Djan contested this accusation and said that payments had indeed been disbursed to the musicians whose content was featured. The second round of revenue distribution from the YouTube platform involved the allocation of royalties to around 30 artists, including Daddy Lumba, Ernest Opoku, Chupa Chops, Appiah, Atumpan, Obaapa Christy, Samini, Stonebwoy, Castro, R2Bees, Okyeame Kwame, and various other musicians.

== Filmography ==
- Dreams and HipHop (2016)
