= Gorilla (advertisement) =

Television advertisement by Cadbury

- A promotional image from the Gorilla campaign.
- Agency: Fallon London
- Client: Cadbury Schweppes
- Language: English
- Running time: 90 seconds
- Product: Cadbury Dairy Milk chocolate
- Release date: 31 August 2007 (television)
- Directed by: Juan Cabral
- Music by: Phil Collins ("In the Air Tonight")
- Starring: Garon Michael
- Production company: Blink Productions, London
- Produced by: Matthew Fone; Nicky Barnes (agency producer)
- Country: United Kingdom
- Budget: £6.2 million (campaign)
- Followed by: Airport Trucks
- Official website: http://www.aglassandahalffullproductions.com/

Gorilla is a British advertising campaign launched by the advertising agency Fallon London on behalf of Cadbury Schweppes in 2007, to promote Cadbury Dairy Milk brand chocolate. The centrepiece of the campaign was a 90-second television and cinema advertisement, supported by related media purchases in billboards, magazines and newspapers, as well as sponsored events and an organised internet presence (contracted out to Hyper). The total cost of the campaign is estimated at £6.2 million. The central television advertisement was created and directed by Juan Cabral and starred the actor Garon Michael.

The advertisement, which first appeared on British television on 31 August 2007, has since appeared in Canada, Australia, South Africa and New Zealand, among other countries, to popular acclaim. A version uploaded to the video sharing website YouTube received 500,000 page views in the first week after the launch. The polling company YouGov reported that public perception of the brand had noticeably improved in the period following the launch, reversing the decline experienced in the first half of 2007.

== Description ==
The advertisement consists of a simple, 90-second tracking shot across a music studio, with Phil Collins' "In the Air Tonight" playing in the background. A large gorilla sitting at a drum kit plays along with the song's famous drum fill.

== Background ==
Gorilla formed a major part of the pitch by Fallon London to draw Cadbury Schweppes away from its established contract with Carat in 2006. Their proposal was to step away from traditional advertisements to a middle-aged, middle-class demographic. Instead, Fallon proposed the production of "entertainment pieces" aimed at a broader range of consumers and spread through viral marketing – that is, through word of mouth. To this end, Cadbury ended its ten-year sponsorship of the popular soap Coronation Street.

Public perception of the Cadbury brand had slipped in the 2006-7 period, following a series of public relations blunders and product recalls. In mid-2006, a leaking pipe in the company's Marlbrook factory led to 40 cases of salmonella exposure and a product recall costing the company over £20 million. Cadbury's failure to inform the Food Standards Agency for five months led to an additional £1 million fine from the Crown Court in Birmingham. In the wake of the scandal, the Food Standards Agency advised the company to improve its "out of date" contamination testing procedures.

Other public relations blunders in the run-up to the campaign included the distribution of chocolate Easter eggs with traces of nuts without nut allergy warnings, the cancellation of a £5 million campaign for Trident chewing gum after complaints of offensive marketing material, and the temporary closure of Granary Burying Ground, a historic cemetery near Boston, United States, following a treasure hunt organised as a sales promotion. In mid-2007, Cadbury announced that it would be cutting around 7,500 jobs. A leaked internal memorandum revealed that many of the jobs would be moved to Poland, causing an outcry from the workers' trade unions.

== Production ==
In the wake of these scandals, the success of Fallon's first media campaign was critical to the continued partnership with Cadbury, and the centrepiece television advertisement received the brunt of the attention. The central idea was "founded upon the notion that all communications should be as effortlessly enjoyable as eating the bar itself". Fallon's Argentine-born creative director Juan Cabral, whose credits include the immensely successful Balls and Paint spots for Sony's BRAVIA line of high-definition television sets, wrote and directed the piece, acting as creative director, art director, copywriter and director. It was his directorial debut. Supporting Cabral were the senior planner Tamsin Davies, the account executive Chris Willingham, the executive creative director Richard Flintham and the agency producer Nicky Barnes. Matthew Fone was the production company producer. The actor Garon Michael was hired to fill the central role for his previous work in similar roles, having played great apes in the feature films Congo, Instinct and the 2001 remake of Planet of the Apes.

Gorilla took three months to produce, despite borrowing substantial parts of the set and props from a number of previous projects. The gorilla suit itself was woven from a "fur" of knotted yak hairs, with an animatronic silicone face. The face itself included 27 remote-controlled motors operated by a pair of technicians, with gross movements handled by Garon Michaels. The suit was cooled by ice-water tubing and a handheld fan pointed at the mouth between takes. While much of the suit had existed before the project, several adaptations were made, including custom-made hands for the drum sequence, foam muscle around the chest and shoulders, a new styling for the pelt, and the addition of a gold tooth, grey hairs and a studio earpiece.

Shooting took place over several days at Music Bank, the rehearsal studios in London.

The spot was filmed by the director of photography Daniel Bronks who inspired the concept when working with Juan Cabral on a previous project, and edited by Joe Guest at Final Cut, London. Post production was done by the London companies The Moving Picture Company (main body, producer Graham Bird) and Golden Square (end frame, producer Jessica Mankowitz). Sound was designed and arranged by Parv Thind at Wave Studios, London.

== Release and marketing ==
A variant of the commercial was broadcast in a single spot, directly before the semi-final of the 2007 Rugby World Cup, at an estimated cost of £700, 000.

The television premiere of the advertisement was on Friday 31 August 2007, during the finale of the eighth series of the United Kingdom reality television show Big Brother, watched by around 14% of British viewers. Additional 90-second spots were commissioned during September, switching to 10-second cuts in October. The 90-second version was rebroadcast as the final commercial in the break before the final of the 2007 Rugby World Cup between England and South Africa on 20 October, with the face of the bass drum emblazoned with an English flag and the slogan "Bring It Home". Another variant of the advert was broadcast a week earlier before the semi-final of the 2007 Rugby World Cup between England and France on 13 October, with the face of the bass drum emblazoned with an English flag and the slogan "Come on Lads". The spot cost Cadbury an estimated £700,000.

Billboard and print campaigns were set up to run alongside the television commercial, and a sponsorship deal with the "Great Gorilla Run" charity fun run through London on 23 September 2007 was set up through Sputnik Communications. An online presence was established with a competition on the Glass and a Half Full Productions website offering tickets to Las Vegas. The Glass and a Half Full Productions website was created by Hyper as part of a UK-focussed digital marketing strategy.

Following the positive reception of the commercial in the United Kingdom and online, Cadbury Canada arranged to show the advertisements in 850 cinemas across Canada during November 2007. Further online tie-ins were launched, including an online game and a competition to win a gorilla suit, a purple drum kit and a year's supply of bananas and Cadbury chocolate bars.

The advertisement was premiered on New Zealand television on Monday, 30 June 2008. The advertisement also helped "In the Air Tonight" re-enter the New Zealand RIANZ Singles Chart at number three in July 2008 and it went on to number one the following week, beating its original 1981 #6 peak.

In August 2008, the advertisement began on Australian television. It was also re-released in the United Kingdom and Ireland with a new backing track, Bonnie Tyler's "Total Eclipse of the Heart". According to the UK newspaper The Guardian, "The new version pays homage to the internet mash-up artist who remixed the original with Tyler's Total Eclipse of the Heart".

In July 2009, the Cadbury World visitor attraction in Birmingham opened a new area, Advertising Avenue. Towards the end of the attraction, in the Music Shop, a chocolate DJ ("D.J. Choc") invites guests to enjoy four selected clips of favourite Cadbury TV adverts - three of these are broadcast on flatscreen monitors, culminating with the lights in a previously-un-noticed drum booth coming on, with a full-sized animatronic gorilla drumming to "In the Air Tonight".

== Reception ==
A comparison of two frames from Gorilla with their respective versions in the untitled Wonderbra parody

The campaign was well received by the British public. The commercial was uploaded to the video sharing website YouTube shortly after it was first broadcast, and was viewed over 500,000 times in the first week. By November 2007, it had been viewed over six million times across a large number of video sharing webhosts. 70 Facebook groups appreciating the advertisement were set up with one, named "We love the Cadbury's drumming gorilla", boasting 200 members. A number of spoofs and parodies were quickly uploaded by amateurs with the tacit approval of Cadbury, and the British branch of Wonderbra created and uploaded their own, Dan Cadan-directed version of the advertisement, replacing the gorilla with the Wonderbra model (and musician) Jentina with the Cadbury strapline "A glass and a half full of joy" being replaced with "Two cups full of joy". While Cadbury tacitly permitted limited display and modification of the commercial without authorisation, the Wonderbra spot was later removed from YouTube following notification from Phil Collins Limited that the piece infringed its copyright to "In The Air Tonight". Gorilla was further parodied as an introduction to the second half of the 2007 Children in Need special, with an actor dressed as Pudsey Bear taking the central role. The British comedy series The Mighty Boosh features a drumming gorilla named Bollo, played by Dave Brown, and the actor appeared as Bollo in a viral video auditioning for the Cadbury advert to promote the third series of the show. This video was later included as an Easter egg on the DVD release of series three.

There was much speculation when the advert first appeared on how it was made – whether the gorilla was real, animatronic or a man in a suit. Many believed that Phil Collins himself was the drummer. When asked about Gorilla, Collins jokingly commented, "Not only is he a better drummer than me, he also has more hair. Can he sing too?" "In the Air Tonight" became a popular online download following its appearance in the commercial, reaching a chart position of 14 within the UK Singles Chart despite not being given a physical re-release, and becoming the third-most-downloaded track of the day on the iTunes Store.

Despite reservations that the campaign might prove too abstract and have little effect, Cadbury reported that sales of Dairy Milk had increased by 9% from the same period in 2006. Measurements of public perception of the brand carried out by YouGov showed that 20% more people looked favourably on the brand in the period after the advertisement's general release than in the previous period. Spokesmen for the company have expressed amazement at the success of the campaign. Notwithstanding the fact that the spot was originally only broadcast online and within the United Kingdom, the commercial appeared in the news in many English-speaking countries such as Canada and Australia, and plans were made for limited expansion of the campaign into those markets. From 23 June 2008, Gorilla was also broadcast in New Zealand with further marketing both on the Cadbury NZ website, and in shopping centres and supermarkets, with models and men in gorilla suits handing out samples of Dairy Milk chocolate.

The advertisement has won numerous awards, including the Epica d'Or for Film 2007, the Grand Cristal at Festival de la Publicité de Méribel, Gold at the British Television Advertising Awards 2008, Gold at the Advertising Creative Circle Awards 2008, Gold at the International ANDY Awards, Black and Yellow Pencils at the D&AD Awards 2008, Gold at the Clio Awards 2008, Bronze at the One Show 2008, the FAB Award 2008, Gold at the Fair Go Ad Awards 2008, and the Film Grand Prix Lion at Cannes Lions 2008, widely considered the most prestigious prize within the advertising community.

VH1 Classic UK also made an ident which shows a man play "In The Air Tonight", and when the famous drum solo comes on, he holds a pair of drumsticks and bangs the pillows in front of him in the tune of the drum solo.

== Sequels and remixes ==
In September 2007, an extended mix of the advertisement was uploaded to YouTube. It used the original 90 second advertisement, but with the video playing in a loop against the backtracking of the full-length version of Collins' "In the Air Tonight".

On 30 March 2008, Cadbury began rolling out the sequel to the Gorilla campaign. Using many of the same ideas, Airport Trucks, again written and directed by Juan Cabral, features heavily customised airport ground support equipment racing at night to Queen's "Don't Stop Me Now".

On 5 September 2008, a second Gorilla advertisement, featuring Bonnie Tyler's "Total Eclipse of the Heart", was broadcast on Channel 4 during the Big Brother 9 final. The new version paid homage to the internet mash-up artist (Javier Malagón) who remixed the original with Tyler's "Total Eclipse of the Heart". This advertisement was immediately followed by a version of Airport Trucks with Bon Jovi's "Livin' on a Prayer". In March 2009, a version of the advertisement was shown in Australia, with the gorilla playing the drums along to John Farnham's "You're the Voice". This version was heavily criticised by the Australian public because it was seen as an inferior copy of the original, and tried to make use of John Farnham's return to the public stage at the recent Sound Relief rock concert.

In January 2009, a new advertisement for Cadbury Dairy Milk was launched featuring dancing eyebrows.

In September 2009, Cadbury's Dairy Milk moved to Fairtrade cocoa beans, and a new record label based on Gorilla's campaign ("A Glass and a Half") saw the advert/song Zingolo.

Preceded by Evolution	Cannes Lions Film Grand Prix Winner; 2008	Succeeded by Carousel
