= Cadbury Dairy Milk =

Brand of chocolate bar

- Logo used since 2020

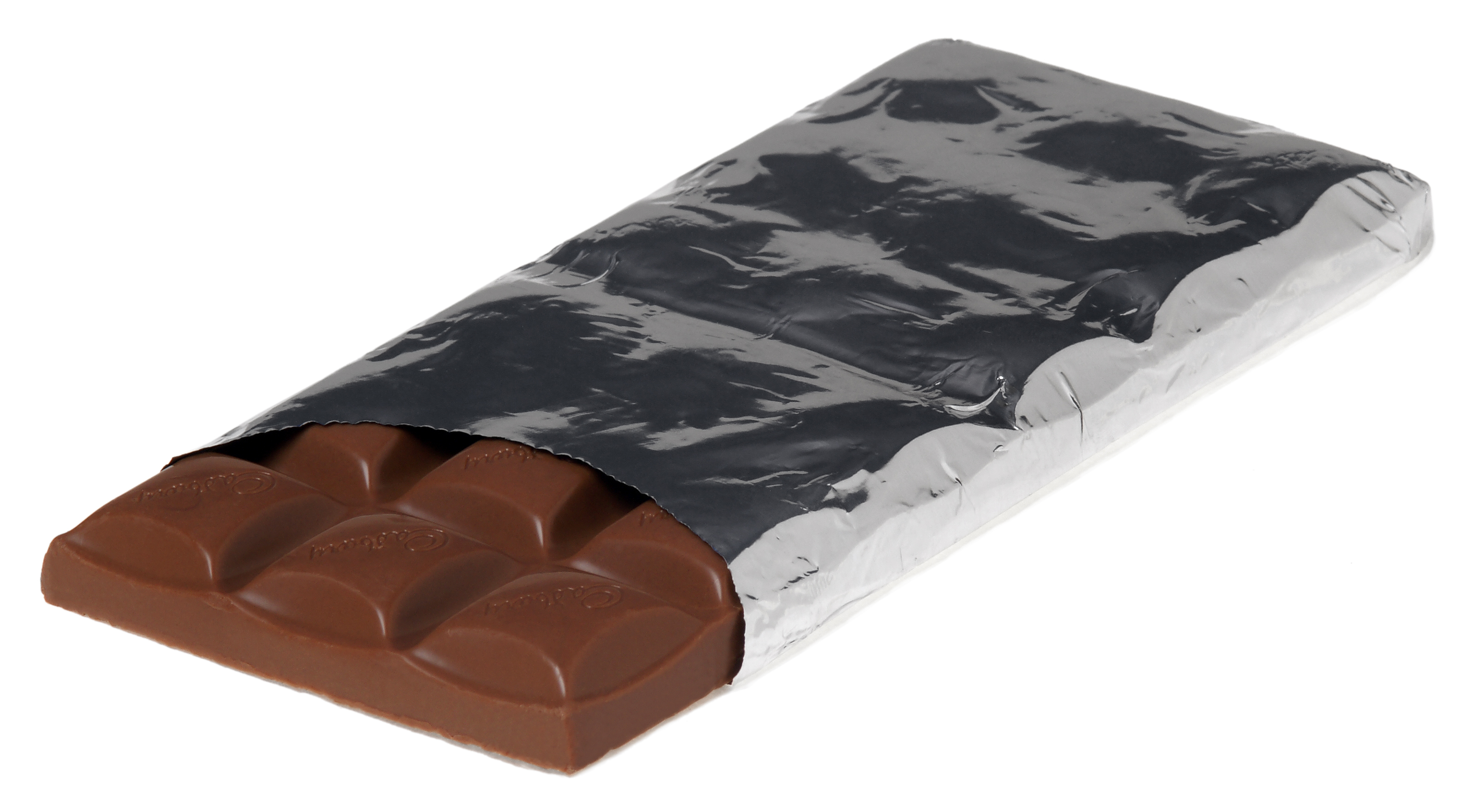
- A Dairy Milk Caramel bar in its foil wrapper
- Product type: Confectionery
- Current owner: Cadbury
- Country: United Kingdom
- Introduced: June 1905; 121 years ago
- Related brands: List of Cadbury products
- Markets: Worldwide
- Website: cadbury.co.uk/dairy-milk

Cadbury Dairy Milk is a British brand of milk chocolate manufactured by Cadbury since 1905. Every product in the Dairy Milk line is made exclusively with milk chocolate. In 1928, Cadbury introduced the "glass and a half" slogan to accompany the Dairy Milk chocolate bar to advertise the bar's higher milk content.

The bar was developed by George Cadbury Jr, and by 1914 had become the company's best-selling product. A century on it has retained its position as a market leader in Britain where it was ranked the best-selling chocolate bar in 2014. Dairy Milk is available in countries including New Zealand, China, India, Sri Lanka, Pakistan, the Philippines, Indonesia, and Bangladesh, as well as in the United States where it is manufactured and distributed by the Hershey Company under licence from Cadbury, with a recipe that differs from the original.

== History ==
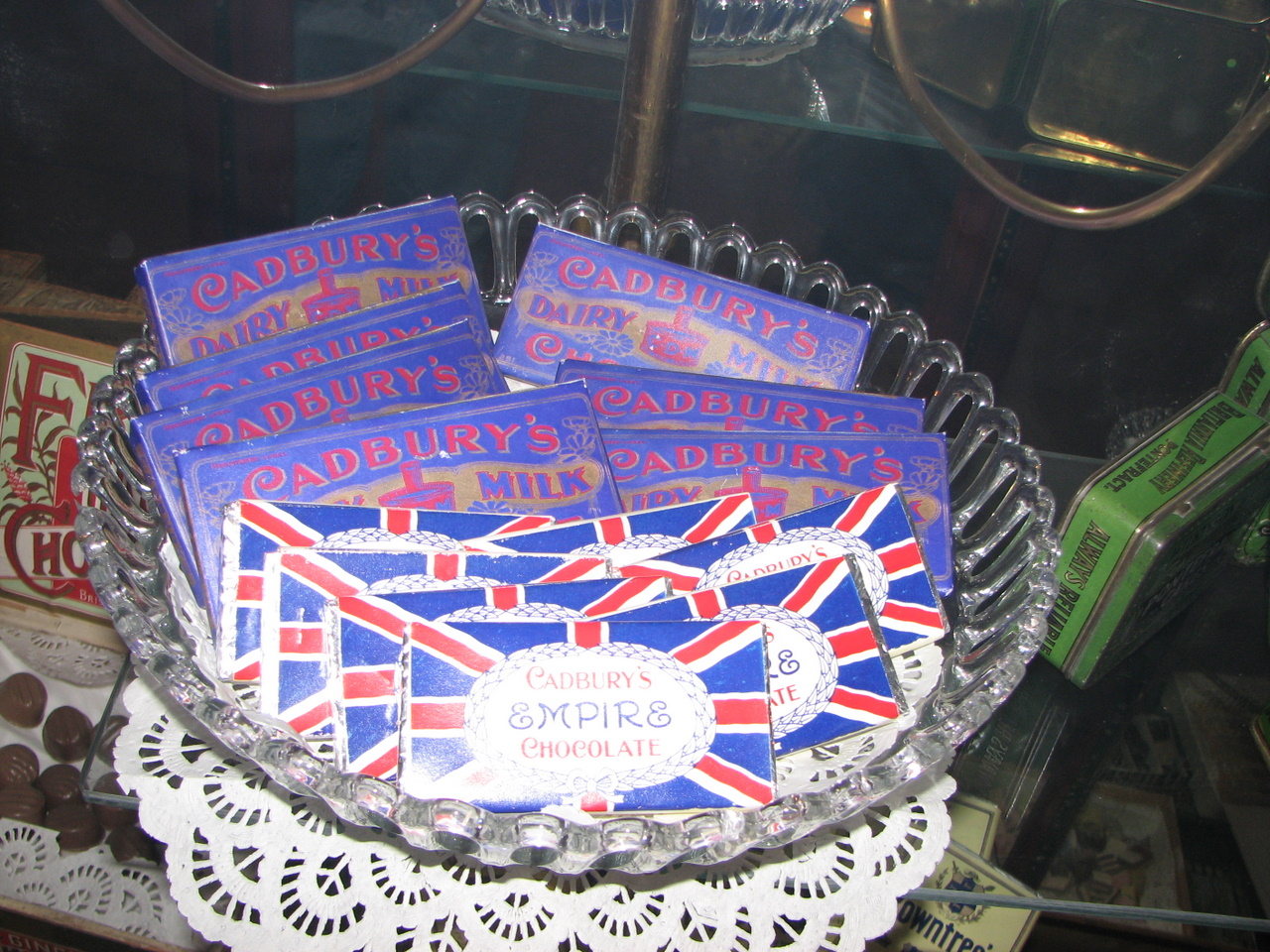
Cadbury chocolate bars (Dairy Milk back of tray), c. 1910

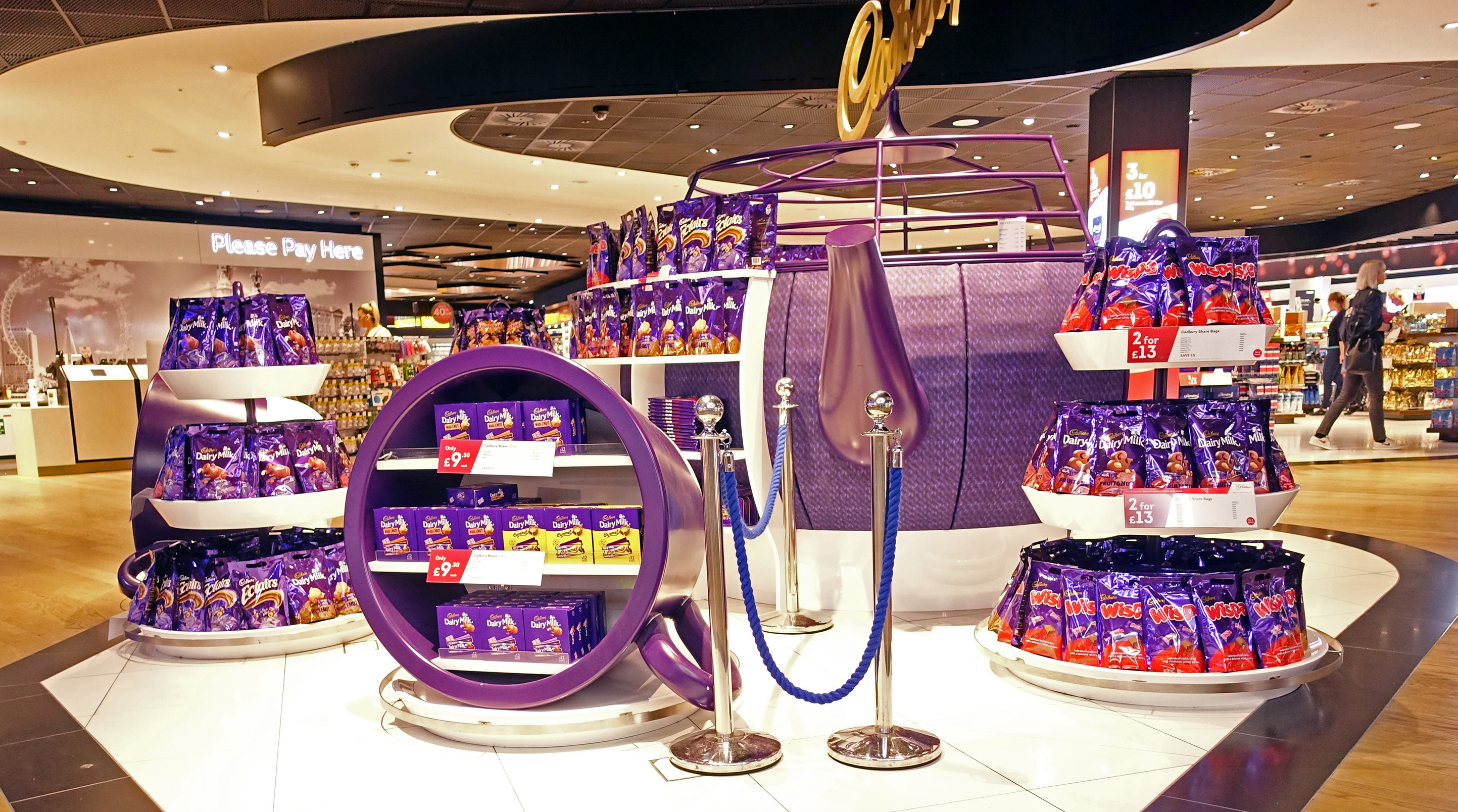
Dairy Milk on sale at a duty-free shop in Heathrow Airport

In June 1905, in Birmingham, England, George Cadbury Jr made Cadbury's first Dairy Milk bar with a higher proportion of milk than previous chocolate bars; by 1914 it had become the company's best-selling product. Through its development, the bar was variously called 'Highland Milk', 'Jersey', and 'Dairy Maid'. Accounts on the origin of the Dairy Milk name differ. It has been suggested that a Plymouth shopkeeper advised the name change; Cadbury maintains that a customer's daughter came up with the name.

Fruit and Nut was introduced as part of the Dairy Milk line in 1926, followed by Whole Nut in 1930. Cadbury's was the brand leader in the United Kingdom at that time. Almost a century on it retains this position, with Dairy Milk ranking as the best-selling chocolate bar in the UK in 2014.

In 1928, Cadbury's introduced the "glass and a half" slogan to accompany the Dairy Milk bar to advertise the bar's higher milk content. In the early 2010s, Cadbury changed the shape of the bar chunks to a more circular shape which reduced the weight.

In 2003, Cadbury expanded the Dairy Milk brand range - the largest range in Cadbury's history - to include new flavours and variants: Biscuit, Crunchie Bits, Bubbly, Mint Chips, Turkish, Crispies, and Wafer and Orange Chips. Cadbury's Caramel bar was also relaunched under the Dairy Milk brand.

A limited edition bar in reproduction 1905 packaging was launched in 2005, to celebrate the Centenary of Cadbury Dairy Milk.

Also in 2005, Cadbury buried a time capsule at the Bournville factory, stating "We're going to bury a Time Capsule that won't be opened until Cadbury Dairy Milk is 200 years young. But, we need your help in deciding what we should leave for future generations."

In 2012, Cadbury won a trademark dispute with Nestlé in the United Kingdom for the purple colour (Pantone 2685C) of its chocolate bar wrappers, a colour introduced in 1914 as a tribute to Queen Victoria. Nestlé successfully appealed the decision in October 2013.

In July 2018, Cadbury announced it would launch a new Dairy Milk version with 30% less sugar. The chief nutritionist of Public Health England, Alison Tedstone, said she was ""pleased that Mondelez is the latest ... to commit to offering healthier products."

In 2024, as part of Cadbury's 200th anniversary, limited edition Dairy Milk bars were packaged in one of seven reproduction packaging designs from 1915, 1940, 1961, 1980, 1993, 2003, and 2024.

More recently, consumers have complained that Cadbury has altered the taste and texture of its chocolate, as well as shrinking the size of their bars. While Mondelez maintains that its recipes are high quality, widespread concerns persist regarding altered taste, often linked to cost-cutting measures, particularly in UK/Ireland markets.

== Variations ==
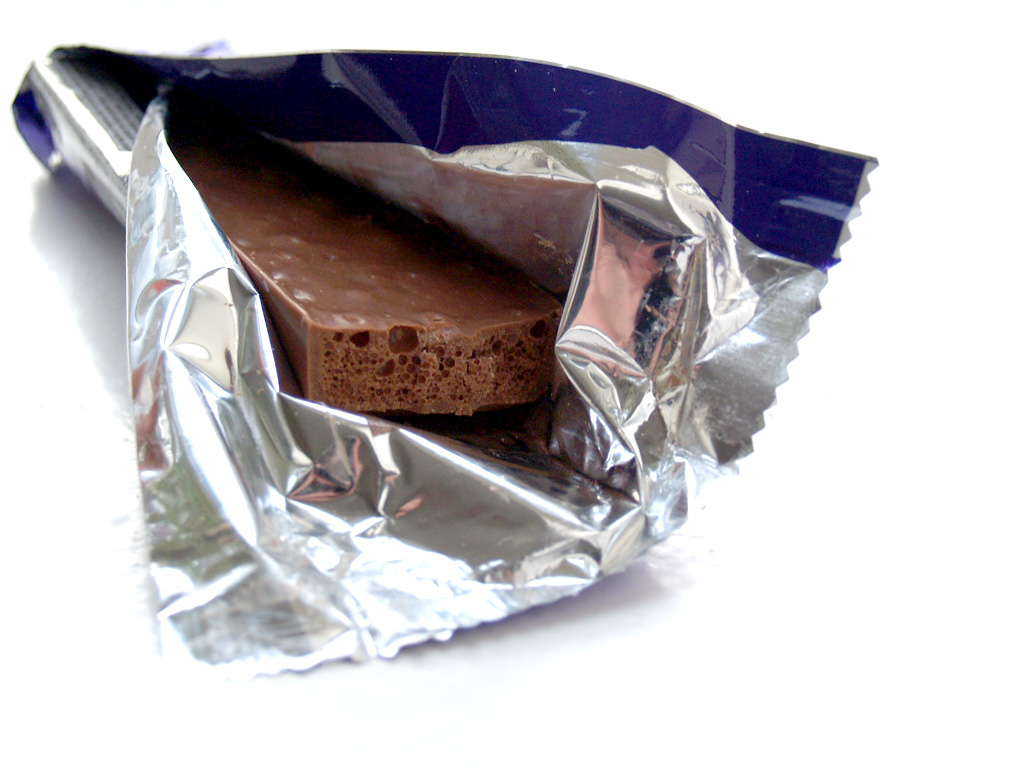
Cadbury Dairy Milk Bubbly

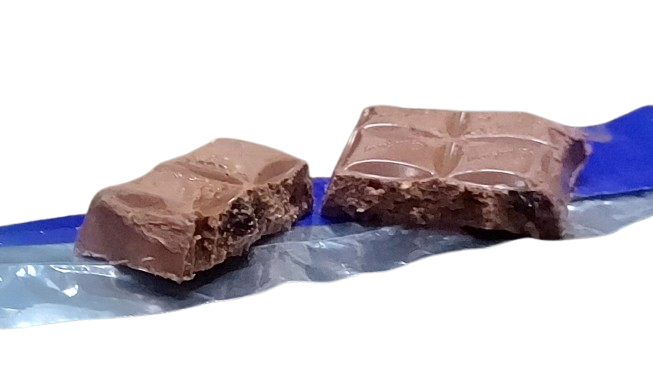
Cadbury Fruit and Nut

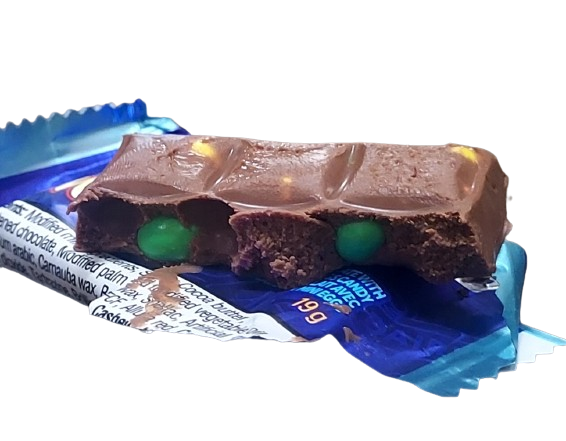
Picture of Cadbury Mini Eggs in a Cadbury Bar

The original Dairy Milk bar ("with a glass and a half of fresh milk") was launched in 1905.

Variations include: Caramel; Fruit & Nut, a bar with raisins and almonds; Whole Nut, with hazelnuts; Dairy Milk Silk, launched in India, in 2010; Dairy Milk Ritz, a bar with salty Ritz crackers, launched in the United Kingdom in 2014; and Dairy Milk with LU biscuits. There is also Dairy Milk Oreo, a bar with an Oreo filling, also made as a mint flavoured bar.

A Vegemite flavoured bar, which consists of milk chocolate, caramel, and Vegemite (5%), was launched in Australia in 2015.

== Ingredients and tastes for local markets ==
A 2007 report in The New York Times listed the British bar as containing (in proportion order) milk, sugar, cocoa mass, cocoa butter, vegetable fat and emulsifiers, whilst the American version manufactured by Hershey started its ingredient list with sugar, and additionally listed lactose, emulsifier soy lecithin, and "natural and artificial flavorings". Cadbury supplied its chocolate crumb to Hershey, which then added cocoa butter during processing. Cadbury said they try "to replicate the taste people grew up with," in the United States, that means a bar that is more akin to a Hershey bar, which to many British palates tastes sour.

== Advertising ==
=== Pre–2007 advertising ===
Cadbury's Fruit & Nut appeared in a 1970s television advertisement that featured humourist Frank Muir singing "Everyone's a fruit and nutcase" to the tune of "Danse des mirlitons" from Tchaikovsky's ballet The Nutcracker.

In Ireland, Cadbury Dairy Milk used the jingle "The Perfect Word For Chocolate" from 1986 to 1988. Between 1989 and 1996, the jingle "The Choice Is Yours The Taste Is Cadbury" with the slogan "Mysteries of Love" was a advertisement.

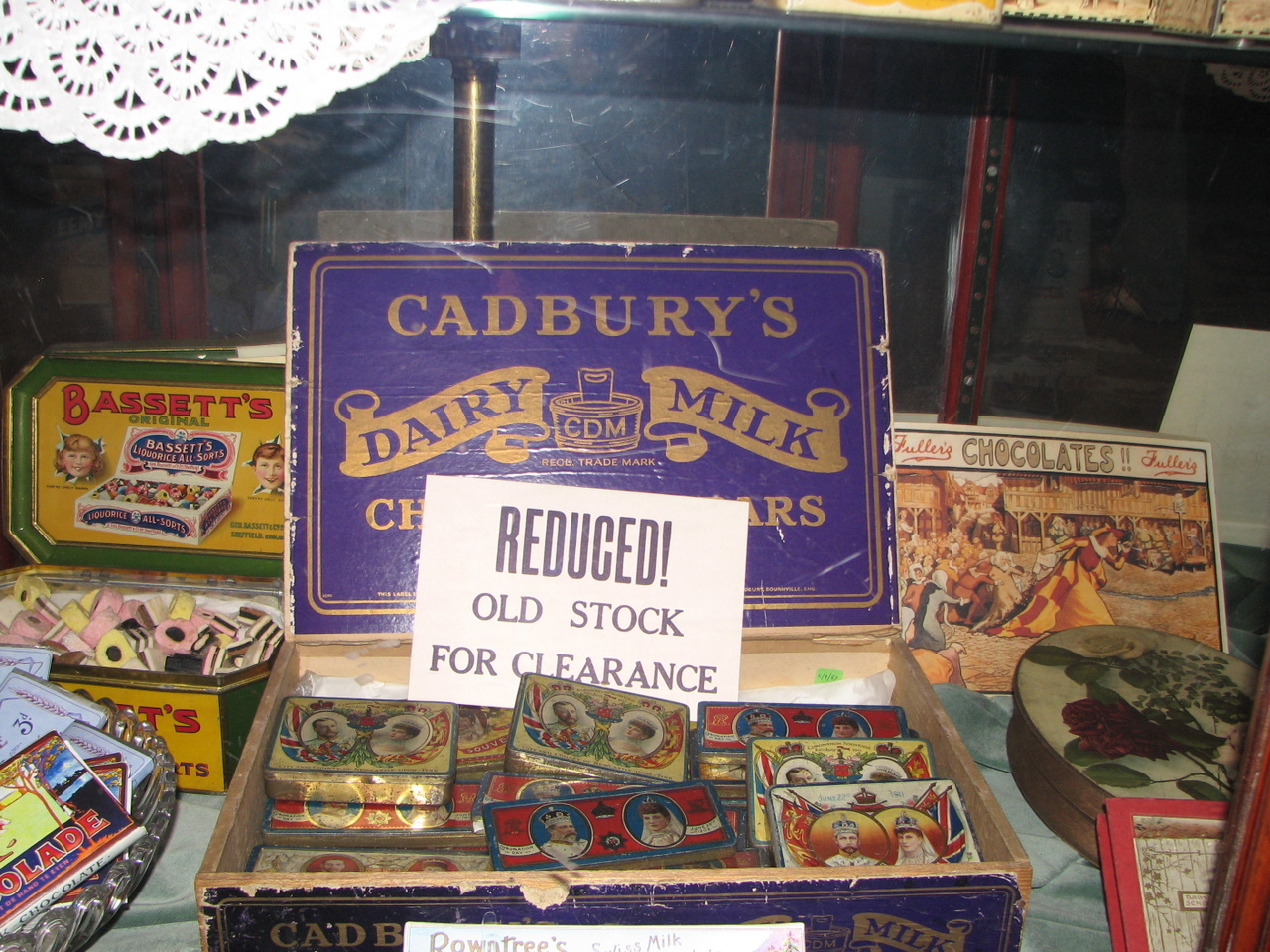
A display of antique Cadbury's Dairy Milk chocolate tins at the Beamish Museum

=== Glass and a Half Full Productions (2007–2011) ===
In 2007, Cadbury launched a new advertising campaign entitled Gorilla, from a new in-house production company called "Glass And A Half Full Productions". The advert was premièred during the season finale of Big Brother 2007, including the Phil Collins song "In the Air Tonight".

On 28 March 2008, the second Dairy Milk advert produced by Glass and a Half Full Productions aired. The ad includes Queen's "Don't Stop Me Now".

On 5 September 2008, an ad was launched with Bonnie Tyler's "Total Eclipse of the Heart" – a reference to online mash-ups of the commercial, and another using Bon Jovi's song "Livin' on a Prayer". Both remakes premiered once again during the finale of Big Brother 2008.

In January 2009, 'Eyebrows', the third advert in the series, was released, including "Don't Stop the Rock" by Freestyle.

=== Glass and a Half Full Records ===
A new 'record label' was launched as part of the Glass and a Half Full Productions campaign. The first song released was Zingolo featuring Tinny, to promote Fairtrade Dairy Milk. A full music video was made incorporating the 60-second ads, as well as a Facebook page.

=== Joyville (2012–2014) ===
In addition, Cadbury brought the "Joyville" concept into Asia, where Singapore bloggers were invited to join in the campaign in 2013.

=== Free The Joy (2014) ===
In 2014, Joyville was replaced with the "Free The Joy" campaign. The song in a television advert is "Yes Sir, I Can Boogie" by Baccara.

=== Marketing in India ===
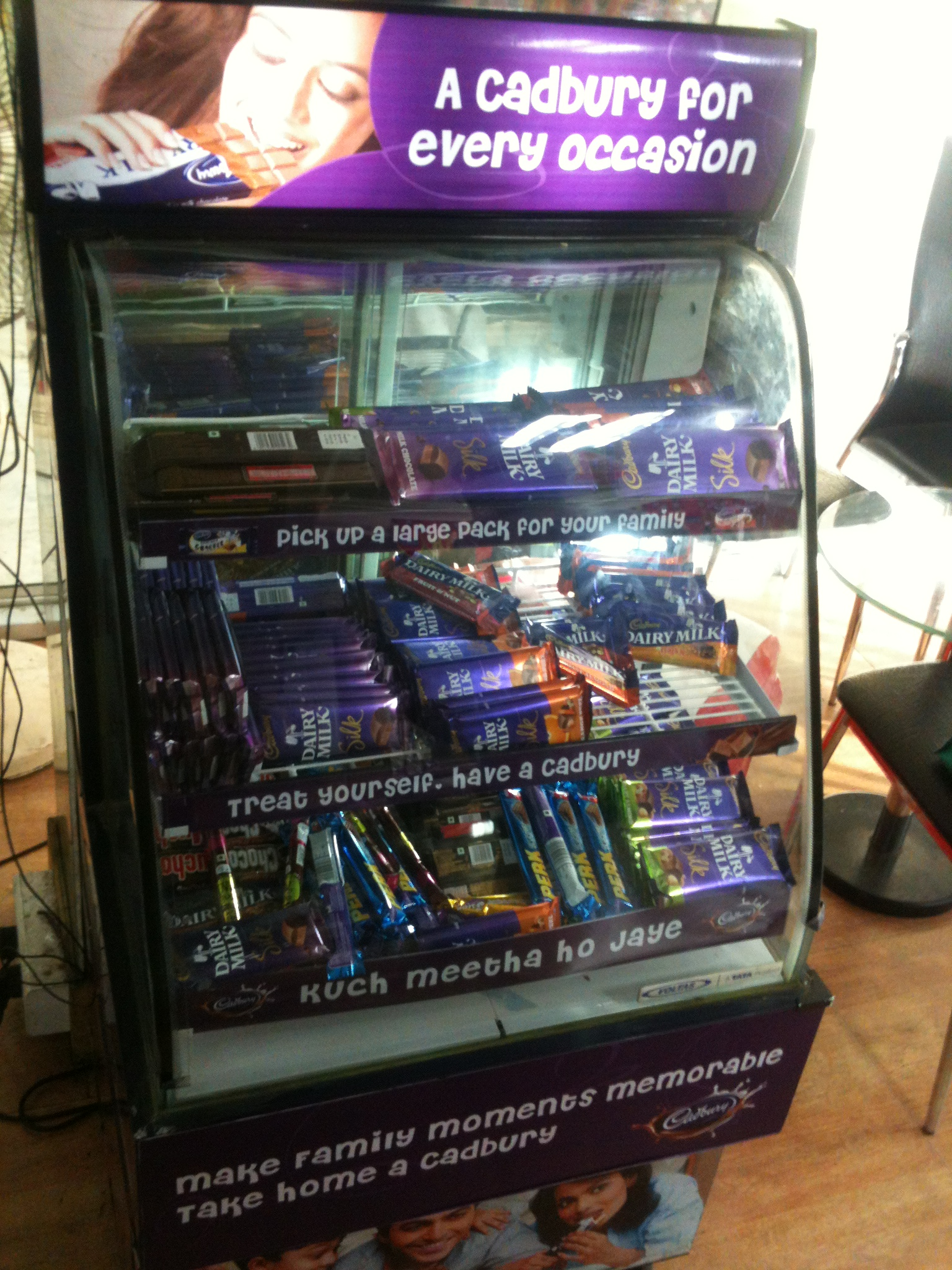
Cadburys Chocolate in refrigerated display at a store in Coimbatore, India

Initially, the company had appointed Amitabh Bachchan as the brand ambassador in 2004. However, the brand soon faced a significant backlash, with worms being spotted in a few of the chocolate bars. With its new campaigns, the company recovered again, with increased sales. One campaign that promoted the product by using the country's love for cricket was successful. The advert was noted to be the best advertisement made in India by The Times of India.

Another famous campaign hosted by the company in the past was the 'Shubh Aarambh' Campaign. This campaign made use of the traditional practice of Indian households of having something sweet before every auspicious occasion. This campaign was successful and positioned Cadbury Dairy Milk chocolates as part of a family name. Cadbury today holds 70% of the market share of the chocolate industry in the country.

== Grey imports in U.S. ==
In 2015, Hershey's blocked imports of overseas-made Cadbury chocolate and other confectionery to the US that infringed on its trademark licensing in a settlement with a grey importer. British Dairy Milk has been blind taste-tested as providing a creamier taste and texture, with the Hershey's-made chocolate reportedly leaving a less pleasing coating on the tongue and a somewhat stale aftertaste.

== Recalls ==
Cadbury was fined £1 million in July 2007 due to its products having been found to have been at risk of infection with salmonella (at a factory in Marlbrook, Herefordshire, England). It spent a further £30 million decontaminating the factory.

On 14 September 2007, Cadbury Schweppes investigated a manufacturing error over allergy warnings, recalling for the second time in two years thousands of chocolate bars. A printing mistake at the Keynsham factory resulted in the omission of nut allergy labels from 250g Dairy Milk Double Chocolate bars.

The 2008 Chinese milk scandal affected Cadbury, when much of the Cadbury Dairy Milk manufactured in mainland China was tainted with melamine. Although it can be safely used in plastic manufacturing, melamine is toxic, particularly to infants.

== See also ==
- List of chocolate bar brands
