= Kojo Antwi =

Ghanaian hiplife and reggae artist

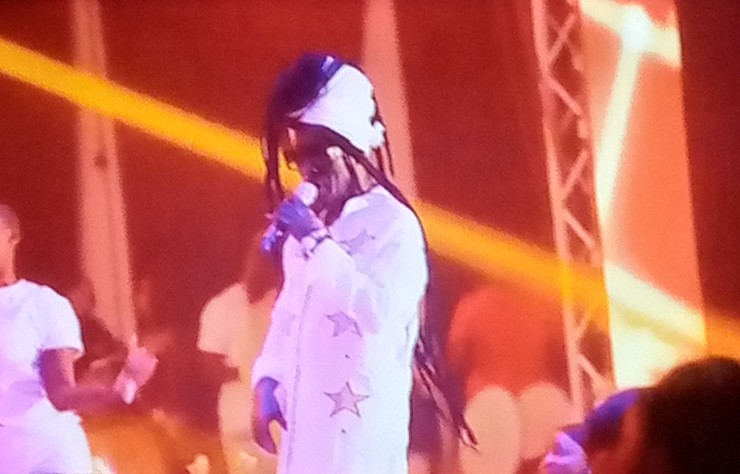
- Antwi in New Jersey, US, 5 August 2018. Photo by Oral Ofori

Background information
- Also known as: Mr Music Man
- Born: Julius Kojo Antwi; 24 November 1959 (age 66); Accra, Ghana
- Origin: Ghana
- Genres: Afro pop, highlife, reggae
- Occupation: Musician
- Instruments: Keyboards, vocals, bass guitar
- Label: Freedom Family Records
- Website: kojoantwi.net

Kojo Antwi, also known as "Mr. Music Man", is a Ghanaian Afro pop, highlife, and reggae musical artist and a former Ghamro chairman. Born with the name Julius Kojo Antwi into a family of 13 siblings, he grew up in Darkuman, a suburb of Accra, Ghana. He has 22 albums to his name, with "Tom & Jerry" being one of his most popular songs in West Africa.

== Career ==
After leaving school, Kojo Antwi started his music career immediately by playing with the band Boomtalents. Later, he became the front-man of Classique Vibes, formerly known as Classique Handles. Eventually, Kojo went solo. His first solo album, All I Need is You, which was released in 1986, became a chartbuster in Ghana. His music is a blend of Ghanaian highlife, Congolese soukous, Caribbean lovers rock, and African American soul and R&B. He is the first Ghanaian Artist to be Nominated for BET Awards.

He sings in Ghana's dominant language, Twi. In June 2018, the Ghanaian record producer cum Musician started a tour of the US.

== Personal life ==
His father, Opanin Kwadwo Asiama Asubonten, died on 2 January 2023 at the Police Hospital in Accra. He also lost his mother in November 2024.

== Discography ==
Studio albums

- All I Need is You (1986)
- Anokye (1989)
- Don't Stop the Music (1991)
- Mr Music Man (1992)
- Groovy (1994)
- To Mother Afrika (1995)
- Superman (1998)
- Afrafra (1999)
- Akuaba (2000)
- Densu (2002)
- Alpha (Compilation) (2003)
- Tattoo (2006)
- Mwaaah! (2009)

== Awards ==
Antwi has received the West Africa Tourism Award, All Africa Music Awards, Kora Award, and the Our Music Award.
