= Kwaw Kese =

Ghanaian hiplife artist

- Also known as: Abodam
- Born: Emmanuel Kofi Botwe; Agona Swedru
- Occupations: Musician, Rapper

Emmanuel Kofi Botwe, known by his stage name Kwaw Kese and popularly called Abodam (craziness), is a Ghanaian hiplife artist. Kwaw Kese is well known for his hit album Abodam 2007, for which he won five awards at the 2008 edition of the Ghana Music Awards.

== Early life and education ==
He was born in Agona Swedru in the Central Region of Ghana. He is an alumnus of Happy Home Junior Secondary School and Winneba Secondary School. He began composing and performing his songs from the age of 14. After his high school education, he worked as a meter reader for the Electricity Company of Ghana for three years. He did not have much interest for that job so he decided to take his music more seriously. He left for Accra and in 2004, he met Hammer of The Last Two and was signed to the record label.

== Record label and solo career ==
He launched the record label Mad-Time Entertainment in 2005. He released his debut solo album which he titled 'Na Ya Tal'. His second album Abodam 07 was released under his label. In 2012, he won Hiphop Song Of The Year at the Ghana Music Awards with the song Popping featuring Opanka.

== Cannabis smoking ==
In December 2014, Kwaw Kese was arrested by the Ghana Police Service in Kumasi for smoking cannabis in public. He appeared in court and was tried.

== Awards ==
=== Ghana Music Awards ===
| Year | Recipient | Award | Result | Reference |
|---|---|---|---|---|
| 2008 | Himself | Artist of the Year | Won | |
| 2008 | "Odeim" | Hiplife Album of the Year | Won | |
| 2008 | Himself | Hiplife Artist of the Year | Won | |
| 2008 | "Odeim" | Hiplife Song of the Year | Won | |

=== His daughter ===
Kwaw Kese joined his daughter, Docilla Nanahemaa Botwe, at the third edition of the Ghana Models Awards Juniors, held at the Ghana International School in Accra, where she was honored with the Pan-African / National Illustration of the Year award.

== Singles ==
| Year | Title | Album | Ref |
|---|---|---|---|
| 2015 | Swedu Agona ft Obrafuor & Teephlow | N/A | |
| 2015 | Aseda ft Duke | N/A | |
| 2017 | Allo ft Shatta Wale | N/A | |
| 2019 | Unlooking ft Zeal & Samini | N/A | |
| 2020 | Kapa | Victory | |

== Videography ==
| Year | Title | Director | Ref |
|---|---|---|---|
| 2015 | Aseda | Alexi Ju Nior and Kwadwo Bediako of Level 7 Films | |
