= Obrafour =

Ghanaian hiplife artist and rapper

- Also known as: Rap Executioner, Rap Sofo
- Born: Michael Elliot Kwabena Okyere Darko; 1976 (age 49–50); Obo Kwahu, Ghana
- Origin: Ghana
- Genres: Hip Hop; Hiplife
- Occupation: Rapper
- Years active: 1990s–present

Michael Elliot Kwabena Okyere Darko, known as Obrafour, Rap Executioner and Rap Sofo, (born c. 1976) is a Ghanaian hiplife musician and rapper.

== Early life ==
Obrafour was born in Obo Kwahu to a chorister, Gladys Agyapomaa, and Kwaku Okyere Darko. He wanted to become a lawyer but failed after his mother's death. This was in 1995 after one term at St. Peter's Boys Senior High School when he was preparing for his A levels. He had his basic education at New Star Preparatory School and proceeded to Abetifi Secondary before getting into St. Peter's Boys Senior High School. As a child, he performed with his mother in church.

== Music career ==
Obrafour has a unique style of Twi rapping and storytelling. His popular and hit debut album "Pae Mu Ka", for which he won 3 awards during the 2000 edition of Ghana Music Awards is arguably one of the best selling albums in Ghana. In May 2019, Obrafour celebrated the 20th anniversary of the "Pae mu ka" album.

His musical influence came from his mother. While in high school, he put together a quartet that sang gospel songs. Later on Quincy a friend of Obrafour's who could rap, introduced him to the art. He attended auditions and performance sessions and met Hammer who was then an amateur beat maker. Hammer facilitated a deal between Obrafour and Abraham Ohene-Djan (OM Studios) and in the latter part of 1999, Pae Mu Ka, his debut album was released. On November 9, 2019, he commemorated the 20th anniversary of the album at the 'Pae Mu Ka' concert at the Accra Intentional Conference Centre.

In April 2023, he filed a lawsuit against Drake for sampling his 'Oye Ohene' remix on his 'Calling my Name' track without his consent. Presenting his case, Obrafour stated that an agent of Drake reached out to him for permission to use his work and went ahead with it without his authorization. He sued for $10 million on the grounds that the song had garnered a lot of patronage on several platforms since its release.

== Discography ==
- Pae Mu Ka (1999)
- Asem Sebe (2001)
- Tofa (2005)
- Asem Beba Dabi
- Heavy (2006)
- Nte Tee Pa (2003)
- Still Strong(2018)
- Love Anthem(2018)
- Adom Bi(2019)

== Awards and nominations ==
=== Ghana Music Awards ===
Year	Nominee / work	Award	Result	Ref
2000	Himself	Rapperzero	Won	
2000	Himself	New Artiste of the Year	Won	
2000	"Pae mu ka"	Hiplife song of the Year	Won	

=== Ghana Music Awards UK ===
Year	Nominee / work	Award	Result	Ref
2004	"Ntete Pa"	Album of the Year	Won	

== Relevant literature ==
- Oduro-Frimpong, Joseph. "The Pleasure(s) of Proverb Discourse in Contemporary Popular Ghanaian Music: The Case of Obrafour’s Hiplife Songs." Being and Becoming African as a Permanent Work in Progress: Inspiration from Chinua Achebe's Proverbs, edited by Franics B. Nyamnjoh, Patrick Nwosu, and Hassan M. Yoimbom. Bamenda, Cameroon: Langaa Research and Publishing. (2021): 259-280.
