= Agogo, Ghana =

Town in Ashanti Region, Ghana

Agogo
- Town
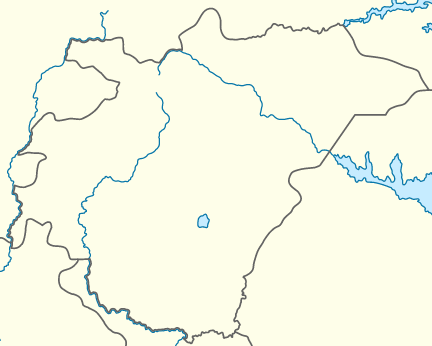
- Location of Agogo within Ashanti
- Coordinates: 6°48′0″N 1°5′0″W
- Sovereign state: Ghana
- Region: Ashanti
- Municipality: Asante Akim Municipal
- Elevation: 396 m (1,299 ft)

Population (2013)
  - Total: 36,797
  - Ethnicity: Ashanti people
  - Demonym: Agogoan
- Time zone: Greenwich Mean Time
  - Summer (DST): GMT

Agogo is a town in the Asante Akim North Municipal District of the Ashanti Region of Ghana. Agogo is approximately 80 kilometers (50 mi) east of Kumasi, the capital of the Ashanti Region, and had a population of 28,271 in the 2000 census. Computer projections estimate that the 2007 population census recorded for the town was 32,859.

== History ==
Around the year 1500, the people of the Aduana clan in Asantemanso, who were originally from Esumegya, dispersed to settle in different parts of the country. One group settled at Nyanawase under Ansa Sasraku, but moved again after a series of wars with the Ashantis and the Gas. In the end they settled in Akwamu.

In the year 1600, three chiefs of the Aduana clan: Ofori Krobon of Agogo, Ntori Nimpa of Kwaman, and Effa Kai of Kumawu left Akwamu to join forces under the command of Ofori Krobon of Agogo with the intention of warring and defeating Ataara Finam to remind readers and historians the actual written name was Atarua not Ataara. He was the supreme ruler of the Afram plains at that time. This war lasted for almost three years. All the lands controlled by the vanquished Ataarua Finam were annexed to the three stools who were independent of each other. Because of this annexation, the three stools – Agogo, Kumawu and Kwaman – all controlled some of the most extensive land possessions in the Ashanti Union. Their lands extended to Akwamu, the Volta Region, Brong Ahafo and to parts of the Northern Region.

While, the people of Agogo settled in Santenso, which is where the three-year war with Ataarua Finam came to an end. Like all other Asante states, the people of Agogo had remained an independent entity until the need to form a union of states became apparent. The people of Agogo did directly participate in the Denkyira war in 1698, which concluded in the liberation of Asanteman from Denkyira under Ashanti King Asantehene Osei Tutu I. However, they did contribute men and materials to support the Ashanti forces.

== Geography ==
Agogo is located at 6.80004 (latitude in decimal degrees), -1.08193 (longitude in decimal degrees) at an elevation/altitude of 396 meters (1,299 ft). The average elevation of Agogo in Asante Akim North Municipal is 396 meters (1,299 ft).

Agogo has a tropical savannah climate.

== Culture ==
Agogo celebrates the Akogya Siakwan Festival, which is a festival of peace, thanksgiving, love and harmony among the communities, in recognition of their primordial selves. The people of Agogo have a strong sense of identity and associate the festival with their faith in Akogya, the river that guards the town.

== Government ==
Agogo is the capital of the Asante-Akim North Municipal Assembly (AANMA) and is in the Asante-Akim North parliament constituency in Ashanti Region. Agogo is represented by Hon. Ohene Kwame Frimpong as Member of Parliament since 7th January 2025. His predecessors are Hon. Andy Appiah Kubi (2017-2023), Hon. Kwadwo Baah Agyemang (2013-2017), Hon. Kwame Anyimadu-Antwi (2009-2012), Hon. Kwadwo Baah Wiredu (1998-2008), and Collins Agyarko Nti (1993-1997) in the 4th Republic.

Nana Kwame Akuoko Sarpong is the paramount chief or Omanhene of the Agogo Traditional Area (1976-2026).

== Agriculture ==
Farming is the main economic activity in Agogo, contributing about 70% of the town's economic output. The town is well noted for growing plantain, watermelon, and tomatoes.

== Education ==
Agogo has a number of schools, including Junior High Schools, Senior Secondary Schools, and Tertiary Institutions.

=== Junior high schools ===
- APCE Demonstrations A, B & C Basic Schools.
- Agogo L/A 2 School.
- Agogo Methodist Primary/JHS.
- Ramseyer Preparatory School.
- Youth Institute of Science & Technology NGO School[Now closed].
- Agogo Presby Primary/JHS
- St. Augustine R/C Primary/JHS.
- Ebenezer Preparatory School.
- Brako Preparatory School.
- Joy International School.
- Agogo L/A 6 JHS.
- Ahmaddiya Muslim Primary School.
- Agogo D/A Saviour Primary/JHS.
- Agogo Presbyterian Basic A, B & C Schools.
- Pentecost D/A Primary/JHS.
- Islamic Basic School.
- Andrews Preparatory School.
- Kyei Preparatory School.
- St Anthony International School.
- Papa Agyei International School.
- Apostolic D/A Basic School.
- Blessed Kids Academy.
- Fountain Christian Academy.
- El-Elyon Learning Centre.
- Agogo M/A Saviour Basic A and B Schools.

=== Senior high schools ===
- Agogo State Senior High School
- Collins Senior High School

=== Tertiary institutions ===
- Agogo Presbyterian College of Education
- Agogo Presbyterian Nurses And Midwifery Training College
- Pentecost Bible College, Agogo campus
- Presbyterian University College, Agogo campus

== Tourism ==
The town is noted for its uniquely hilly landscape, earning it the name "Naturally Walled Town." Agogo also boasts of waterfalls at Hwidiem and Onyemso.

== Sports ==
Sports plays a very important role in the lives of the people in Agogo. The key sporting events/activities in the town include, but not limited to football (Soccer), track and field events, table tennis, handball, basketball, volleyball and netball. Aside the usual tournaments organised among Junior High, Senior High, and Tertiary Institutions, there are other sporting events. Among them is the annual Asante Akim Marathon Challenge.

There are football clubs in Agogo. They include D.C United Agogo, and Pacific Heroes.

== Institutions ==
Agogo's Presbyterian Hospital, established 21 March 1931, is the oldest mission hospital in Ashanti and Ghana. Its Ophthalmology program serves patients from Ashanti, Ghana, Burkina Faso, Côte d'Ivoire, and Togo.

There is a collaboration with the Kumasi Centre for Collaborative Research (KCCR) in Kumasi, which is part of the Kwame Nkrumah University of Science and Technology Kumasi and associated with the Bernhard Nocht Institute for Tropical Medicine in Hamburg, Germany.

The Asante-Akyem campus of Presbyterian University College is in Agogo, with a health and medical sciences department affiliated with the hospital.

Agogo and Fort Lauderdale, Florida, in partnership with Fort Lauderdale-based Citrix Systems and Sister Cities International, launched the prototype Cyber Sister Cities (CSC) program.

== Notable people ==
- Hon. Kwadwo Baah-Wiredu (late Finance Minister, Republic of Ghana)
- Hon kwadwo Baah Agyemang former member of parliament and currently board chairman, national sports authority
- Richmond Boakye, football player
- Dan Amakye Dede, Highlife Legend
- Ofori Amponsah, highlife Musician
- Kofi B, also known as Kofi Boakye Yiadom and Kofi B., Musician
- F.P. Kyei Former Inspector General of Police,(IGP) of the Ghana Police Service from 27 November 1979 to 6 June 1981

== Sister city ==
Agogo has a sister city:

Sovereign state	City	State	Date
United States	Fort Lauderdale, Florida	Florida	2001
