= Shikome (drummer) =

Justice Nii Adjiri Williams, popularly known as Shikome is a Ghanaian master drummer. He was born on 3 June 1978 in Avenor, Accra, Ghana into a family of accomplished musicians and drummers including Okeyrema Akoto, Obo Addy, Mustapha Tetteh Addy, Yacub Addy and Aja Addy. In 2013, he was installed Obonufoi Atsɛ Nii Tlema II of Sowutuom Nsunfa (Chief/Master drummer) after his grandfather Obo Addy who was Obonufoi Atsɛ Nii Tlema I (Chief/Master drummer). This position entitles him to lead all official drumming assignments for the Gã State.

On Saturday, 7 May 2016 Shikome was adjudged the Best Instrumentalist for that year at the Vodafone Ghana Music Awards (VGMA) main event. He has worked with a host of Ghanaian artistes including Amandzeba, Becca, Kwabena Kwabena, Gyedu Blay Ambolley, Paa Bobo, Kofi Sammy, Rex Omar, Kojo Antwi, Efya, Amakye Dede, Chistiana Love, Tagoe Sisters, Bessa Simons, Bob Pinodo and Daughters of Glorious Jesus.

He has also been a member of several bands such as Megastar, Patchbay, Western Diamonds, El Foukr R'Assembly and Wind Afrique. He is presently the Congas player and percussionist for Gyedu Blay Ambolley's Sekondi Band.
