= Ohene Kwame Frimpong =

Ghanaian entrepreneur, politician and philanthropist (born 1986)

Hon. Ohene Kwame Frimpong

Parliament of Ghana Member of Parliament
- Incumbent
- Assumed office 7 January 2025
- Preceded by: Andy Kwame Appiah-Kubi

Member of the Ghana Parliament for Asante-Akim North

Personal details
- Born: 23 September 1986 (age 40)
- Party: Independent
- Parent: Kwadwo Smart (father)
- Education: Central University College
- Occupation: Member of Parliament
- Profession: Politician, Philanthropist, Entrepreneur
- Committees: Roads and Transportation; Standing Orders

Ohene Kwame Frimpong (born 23 September 1986) is a Ghanaian entrepreneur and politician. He is the member of parliament for the Asante-Akyem North constituency in the Ashanti Region of Ghana.

Frimpong contested the 2024 parliamentary elections as an independent candidate and defeated the incumbent member of parliament, Andy Kwame Appiah-Kubi.

== Early life and education ==
Frimpong hails from Agogo Asante Akyem. He completed his basic education at Cosmos Preparatory School in Lapaz, Accra, Ghana. He attended Aggrey Memorial A.M.E. Zion Senior High School for his secondary education. He later obtained his first degree from Central University College in Ghana and later pursued further studies at The College of Haringey, Enfield, and North East London (CONEL) in the United Kingdom.

== Career ==
Frimpong established Salt Media GH, a multimedia company that includes Salt 95.9 FM, Salt TV, and the online platform saltfmonline.com. He also launched Bofrot Puff Puff in 2021 as a quick mix for Bofrot, a Ghanaian breakfast delicacy.

In 2024, he teamed up with Medikal to organise the Medikal Live in London concert at the Indigo O² in the UK.

== Politics ==
In October 2023, he announced his intention to contest the seat of the Asante Akyem North Constituency as an independent candidate in the 2024 general elections. He was elected on December 7, 2024 in Ghana's general elections defeating Andy Kwame Appiah-Kubi, the incumbent MP. He and the other three independent candidates joined the NDC majority caucus in parliament.

== Philanthropy ==
Frimpong supported the construction of a classroom unit at Savior M. A. School in Asante Akyem Agogo. In 2024, Ohene led the construction of a new clinic in Asante Agogo.

== Recognition ==
Kwame's contribution to the reconstruction of the Agogo Central Mosque was recognized with a citation of honour from Asantehene Otumfuo Osei Tutu II, the National Chief Imam, Sheikh Osman Nuhu Sharubutu as well as the President of Ghana, Nana Akufo-Addo at the Head of State Awards.

Kwame was named in Avance Media's Top 50 Most Influential People, in Ghana in 2021 and was the ‘African Young Entrepreneur of the Year' at 2021 African Achievers Awards. He was also one of the five entrepreneurs selected to receive the African Youth Badge Honoree Award.

The National Communications Awards in Ghana named Kwame the Emerging Media CEO of The Year and he also won the Best Entrepreneur in Food and Beverage at the Ghana 40 under 40 awards.

== Detention ==
Ohene Kwame Frimpong was arrested by Dutch security officials at Schiphol Airport in Amsterdam shortly after a KLM flight from Accra landed in the Netherlands over allegations of romance scams and money laundering. Parliament of Ghana confirmed the detention of the honorable Member of Parliament for the Asante Akyem North on Tuesday, 12th May, 2026.

The former Member of Parliament for the area, honorable Andy Appiah-Kubi added his voice to the recent arrest and detention of the current member of parliament saying that the MP must be presumed innocent until he's proving guilty. He added that "it is very unfortunate that a thing like that has happened. But professionally, I understand that a person is deemed to be innocent until proven guilty, and, therefore, I would jump into conclusions. He has the right to defend himself and I'm sure he will exercise that right."

== See also ==
- Andy Kwame Appiah-Kubi
- Kwadwo Baah Agyemang
- Kwame Anyimadu Antwi
- Kwadwo Baah-Wiredu
