= Collins Agyarko Nti =

Ghanaian politician (born 1958)

MP for Asante Akyem North
- In office 7 January 1993 – 6 January 1997
- President: Jerry John Rawlings
- Preceded by: Nana Akuoko Sarpong
- Succeeded by: Kwadwo Baah-Wiredu

Personal details
- Born: 25 August 1958 (age 68) Ashanti region Ghana)
- Party: National Democratic Congress
- Education: Kumasi Polytechnic, Ghana
- Occupation: Politician
- Profession: Government official

Collins Agyarko Nti (born 25 August 1958) is a Ghanaian politician and a member of the first Parliament of the fourth Republic representing the Asante Akyem North constituency in the Ashanti region.

== Early life and education ==
Collins Agyarko Nti was born on 25 August 1958 at Asante Akyem North in the Ashanti region of Ghana. He attended Kumasi Polytechnic (now Kumasi Technical University) and obtained his Bachelor of Science after he studied chemistry.

== Politics ==
Collins Agyarko Nti was first elected into parliament on the ticket of the National Democratic Congress during the 1992 Ghanaian general elections for the Asante Akim North constituency in the Ashanti region of Ghana. He contested again in 1996 and lost to Kwadwo Baah-Wiredu who polled 63% of the valid votes cast whilst Collins Agyarko polled 27%. He served for one term as a member of parliament for the Asante Akim North Constituency.

== Career ==
Collins Agyarko Nti is the Coordinating Director of the Country Coordinating Mechanism(CCM). He is a Government official, and was also a former member of parliament for the Asante Akim North Constituency in the Ashanti Region of Ghana.

== Religion ==
Nti is a Christian.
