= Asante-Akim Central (Ghana parliament constituency) =

Constituency in the Ashanti Region of Ghana

- constituency for the Parliament of Ghana
- District: Asante Akim Central Municipal District
- Region: Ashanti Region of Ghana

Current constituency
- Party: New Patriotic Party
- MP: Kwame Anyimadu-Antwi

Asante-Akim Central is one of the constituencies represented in the Parliament of Ghana. It elects one Member of Parliament (MP) by the first past the post system of election. Asante-Akim Central is located in the Asante Akim North district of the Ashanti Region of Ghana. The member of parliament for the constituency is Kwame Anyimadu-Antwi.

== Boundaries ==
The seat is located within the Asante Akim Central Municipal Assembly of the Ashanti Region of Ghana. Asante Akim Central District is one of the districts in Ashanti Region, Ghana. It was formerly known the Asante Akim North Municipal District until July 2012, when part of the district was split out to become a new Asante Akim North District; thus the remaining being renamed as Asante Akim Central Municipal District. The municipality is located in the eastern part of Ashanti Region and has Konongo as its capital town.

== Members of Parliament ==
Election	Member	Party	Ref
2012	Kwame Anyimadu Antwi	New Patriotic Party	
2016	Kwame Anyimadu Antwi	New Patriotic Party	

== See also ==
- List of Ghana Parliament constituencies
