= Kwadwo Baah (disambiguation) =

Kwadwo Baah (born 2003) is a German footballer.

Kwadwo Baah may also refer to:

- Kwadwo Baah Agyemang (born 1975), Ghanaian politician
- Kwadwo Baah-Wiredu (1952–2008), Ghanaian politician
