= Iron Boy (album) =

Studio album by Black Sherif
- Released: 3 April 2025
- Genres: Hip-hop; Afrobeats; Highlife
- Length: 43:19
- Labels: Blacko Management; Empire
- Producers: Joker Nharnah; Dystinkt Beats; Afrolektra; Louddaaa; Samsney; AR Beats; Ayzed; Baba Wvd; Marvio; Lekaa Beats; Dino Pathekas

Black Sherif chronology
Take Care of Yourself Blacko (2023)	Iron Boy (2025)

Singles from Iron Boy
- 1. "January 9th" Released: 9 January 2024; 2. "So It Goes" Released: 3 February 2025

Iron Boy (stylized in all caps) is the second studio album by Ghanaian rapper and songwriter Black Sherif, released on 3 April 2025 through Blacko Management and Empire. The album features guest appearances from Nigerian singers Fireboy DML and Seyi Vibez, in which Fireboy DML was featured on the album's lead single, "So it Goes". Iron Boy combines hip-hop, Afrobeat, and Highlife together with exploring the themes of strength and vulnerability. The album, soon after release, received critical acclaim from music critics and the public alike.

Iron Boy was also a commercial success. The album had become the first Ghanaian release to have spent two full weeks on the Top 50 chart on Apple Music (USA). It had also set a record for the most streams in a day for a Ghanaian album on Spotify, hitting 2 million streams. Iron Boy peaked at number 10 on the US World Albums (Billboard) and number 5 on the Nigerian Top 100 Albums (TurnTable).

== Background ==
In an interview with Wonderland, Black Sherif said that he named the album Iron Boy because of the "feelings that were surrounding [him] while making the album" and being inspired by Ghanaian highlife pioneer Amakye Dede, as him and Black Sherif are both from Konongo, Ghana. In the same interview, he summarizes the feeling of album in three words: "resilience, toughness and freedom."

The album builds upon the foundation he had established on his debut album The Villain I Never Was, which dealt with adversity, pressure, resilience and tribulations. Unlike that album, Iron Boy portrays Sherif exploring in sweeter themes like victory, strength, and inspiration. In another interview with Clash, Sherif stated that the album pays "homage to Amakye Dede," who Sherif insist "is the first Iron Boy and a highlife pioneer." Following these statements, he says "I just recently found out he was best friends with my grandfather when I went to visit him. He had an album that came out in the 90’s called Iron Boy."

In an interview with Daily Graphic, Black Sherif shares on what the album means to him.

This is the biggest project of my career so far. It’s not just an album—it’s my life, my emotions and my truth. It tells my story from the moment I stepped into the music industry to where I am now. My struggles, my victories, my doubts and my faith in my journey are all in here.

== Lyricism and production ==
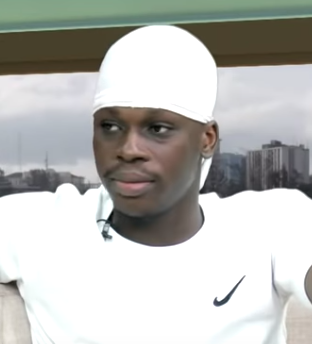
Fireboy DML and Seyi Vibez were both featured on the album, with Fireboy being featured on the song "So it Goes" and Vibez on "Sin City."

Iron Boy features guest appearances from Nigerian singers Fireboy DML and Seyi Vibez. Throughout the album's 15 tracks, combines hip-hop, Afrobeat, and Highlife together with exploring the themes of strength and vulnerability.

Production on Iron Boy was mainly handled by longtime collaborator, Joker Nharnah, and Lekaa Beats, who had worked with other musicians such as Nasty C and Omah Lay. In an interview with Graphic Online, Sherif stated that every song on the album constitute a chapter of his life that captures both his lowest points and his most victorious highs.

=== Singles ===
The first track of the album, "Victory Song," provides a self-inspective view of Black Sherif sharing his musical journey from a normal street boy to making waves both locally and internationally. This opener establishes a calm and smoothing tone for the album, indicating as to what is to come.

It is followed up with "One", where he exposes deeper thoughts about his challenges before continuing onto the album's lead single "So It Goes", which features Fireboy DML. The song was released 2 months before its official release (3 February 2025). The song was released months before the album's official release. Following it, the songs "Top of the Morning," "Body" and "Sacrifice" carries themes of hope, giving listeners some form of inspiration.

The seventh track, "Soma Obi," shows Black Sherif displaying himself at his best, which is followed by songs such as "Dreamer", "Where Dem Boyz", and "Rebel Music". Those songs in shows Sherif offering some of his ruthless songwriting skills. Building upon "Where Dem Boyz," the song depicts Black Sherif calling out who preach unity and fairness but secretly stir up division in the music industry, while also reflecting on his own personal experiences.

The title track, "Iron Boy," sees Sherif reflecting on the importance of taking time to be happy, something that he has been intentional of over the past year. Furthermore, the second collaboration on the album featuring Seyi Vibez, "Sin City," shows emotional depth and appreciation for the goodness of his hustle.

The album closes with the songs "Eye Open", "Changes" and finally "January 9th", which was released last year (9 January 2024).

== Promotion ==
Black Sherif embarked on a six-day North American tour that starts on 4 April 2025 to celebrate the album's release. He would then head to Europe for another 11-day tour that will include performances at London's Shepherd's Bush Empire.

== Critical reception ==
Soon after the album's release, Iron Boy received positive reviews from the public. Dancehall artist Shatta Wale called it "a masterpiece," and rapper Sarkodie who had collaborated with Sherif on the song "Country Side" indicated nothing was greater than listening to the tape on the morning of its release. Efya also commented on the album, stated that "The sonics, the writing, the expression, the spiritual depth… Everything is so intense. I love it."

== Track listing ==
Iron Boy track listing
No.	Title	Lyrics	Producer(s)	Length
1.	"The Victory Song"	Mohammed Ismail Sherif	Joker Nharnah	2:55
2.	"One"	Sherif	Dystinkt Beats	3:12
3.	"So It Goes" (featuring Fireboy DML)	Sherif; Adedamola Oyinlola Adefolahan	Afrolektra; Joker Nharnah; Louddaaa^{[b]}; Samsney^{[a]}	3:43
4.	"Top of the Morning"	Sherif	AR Beats; Joker Nharnah	2:16
5.	"Body"	Sherif	Dystinkt Beats	2:47
6.	"Sacrifice"	Sherif	Ayzed; Samsney^{[a]}	2:33
7.	"Soma Obi"	Sherif	Joker Nharnah	2:41
8.	"Dreamer"	Sherif	AR Beats; Joker Nharnah	2:20
9.	"Rebel Music"	Sherif	Afrolektra; Baba Wvd; Joker Nharnah; Louddaaa^{[b]}; Samsney^{[a]}	2:41
10.	"Where Dem Boyz"	Sherif	Dystinkt Beats	2:46
11.	"Iron Boy"	Sherif	Dystinky Beats	3:15
12.	"Sin City" (featuring Seyi Vibez)	Sherif; Balogun Afolabi Oluwaloseyi	Joker Nharnah; Marvio; Samsney^{[a]}	2:48
13.	"Eye Open"	Sherif	Lekaa Beats	2:17
14.	"Changes"	Sherif	Dino Pathekas; Joker Nharnah	3:17
15.	"January 9th"	Sherif	Joker Nharnah	3:42
Total length:				43:19

Notes

- ^{^[a]}stylized as SAMSNEY.
- ^{^[b]}stylized as LOUDDAAA.

== Personnel ==
- Black Sherif – vocals
- Mike Seaberg – mastering, mixing
- Samuel Sarpong – mixing
- Joshua Moszi – guitar (tracks 1–4)
- OJ Adams – keyboards (track 1)
- Fireboy DML – featured artist (track 3)
- Yoma Yoma – vocals (track 9)
- Seyi Vibez – featured artist (track 12)
- Gertrude Odarley Tetteh – vocals (track 15)
- Gifty Akasi Morkeh – vocals (track 15)
- Rachel Armah – vocals (track 15)

== Charts ==
Chart performance for Iron Boy
Chart (2025)	Peak position
Nigerian Albums (TurnTable)	3
US World Albums (Billboard)	10

== Release history ==
Release history and formats for Iron Boy
Region	Date	Format	Label
Various	3 April 2025	Streaming; digital download	Blacko Management; Empire

== Work cited ==
- Asare, Simon (3 April 2025). "Album Review: Ghana's music treasure Black Sherif delivers spiritual vibes on "Iron Boy"". Ghana News Agency.
