= Joyce Boatey-Agyei =

Ghanaian football coach and educator

Personal information
- Full name: Joyce Boatey-Agyei
- Date of birth: July 10, 1972 (age 54)
- Place of birth: Konongo, Ashanti Region, Ghana
- Position: Right winger

Youth career
- Years: Team
- Konongo Mines

Managerial career
- 2016–2018: Nana Afua Kobi Ampem Ladies
- 2019–: Supreme Ladies
- 2020–: Ghana women's national under-15 team

Joyce Boatey-Agyei (born 10 July 1972) is a Ghanaian football coach, educator and former footballer. She is the head coach of the Ghana women's national under-15 football team, popularly known as the Black Damsels. Under her leadership, Ghana won the 2025 CAF African Schools Football Championship, the country's first title in the competition.

She also serves as an assistant coach of the Ghana women's national football team (Black Queens). In 2025, she became one of Ghana's certified Confederation of African Football (CAF) coaching instructors after successfully completing the CAF Women Instructors Development Programme.

== Early life and education ==
Boatey-Agyei was born on 10 July 1972 in Konongo in the Ashanti Region of Ghana and hails from Patriensa in the Asante Akyem area. She attended Konongo Mines Experimental Basic School before continuing her secondary education at Bompata Presbyterian Senior High School. She obtained a Diploma in Education from Akrokerri College of Education in 1995 before enrolling at the University of Cape Coast, where she earned a Bachelor of Education degree in Health, Physical Education and Recreation in 2002 and a Master of Education degree in the same field in 2015.

== Playing career ==
Boatey-Agyei played football from an early age as a right winger, representing boys' teams at Konongo Mines before playing for school teams from basic school through teacher training college. While studying at the University of Cape Coast, she also represented the university's women's football team.

Although she did not have an extensive senior playing career, her playing experience laid the foundation for her later work in coaching and player development.

== Teaching career ==
Alongside her football career, Boatey-Agyei has worked as a physical education teacher. She taught at Odorgonno Senior High School in Accra from 2002 to 2008 before joining Anglican Senior High School, Kumasi, where she taught and coached the girls' football team from 2008 to 2012. She later became a physical education tutor at Kumasi Girls' Senior High School, where she has continued to coach the school's football teams.

== Coaching career ==
=== Early coaching ===
Boatey-Agyei began coaching school football while working as a physical education teacher. After obtaining coaching qualifications through programmes organised by the Ghana Football Association (GFA), the Confederation of African Football (CAF) and FIFA, she transitioned into women's club football.

She served as head coach of Nana Afua Kobi Ampem Ladies from 2016 to 2018 before being appointed head coach of Supreme Ladies in Kumasi in 2019.

=== Ghana women's national under-15 team ===
In January 2020, the Ghana Football Association appointed Boatey-Agyei as the first head coach of the Ghana women's national under-15 football team, popularly known as the Black Damsels.

She guided the team through its formative years, overseeing talent identification and youth player development programmes across Ghana. In April 2025, she led the Black Damsels to victory in the CAF African Schools Football Championship, hosted at the University of Ghana Stadium in Accra.

During the tournament, Ghana defeated Morocco, Benin and Malawi in the group stage before overcoming defending champions South Africa in the semi-finals and Uganda in the final to win the championship.

The victory marked Ghana's first CAF African Schools Football Championship title and earned the team the competition's top prize of US$300,000 for football development.

Following the achievement, Boatey-Agyei received a nomination for Coach of the Year at the 2025 Ghana Football Awards.

In an interview with CAF during the tournament, Boatey-Agyei said that encouraging young players to express themselves confidently and enjoy the game was central to her coaching philosophy.

=== Black Queens ===
In January 2023, Boatey-Agyei was appointed assistant coach of the Ghana women's national football team, the Black Queens, under head coach Nora Häuptle. She became part of the technical team responsible for preparing the national side for international competitions, including the Women's Africa Cup of Nations qualifiers.

=== CAF coaching instructor ===
Boatey-Agyei has completed several coaching qualification programmes organised by FIFA, CAF and the Ghana Football Association, including the CAF A Licence and FIFA Grassroots Coaching Course.

In 2025, she successfully completed the CAF Women Instructors Development Programme in Addis Ababa, Ethiopia, becoming one of Ghana's certified CAF coaching instructors. Following her certification, CAF approved her to serve as a lead instructor for CAF C and CAF B Licence coaching courses and as an assistant instructor for CAF A Licence courses across Africa.

== Personal life ==
Boatey-Agyei is married and has three children.

== Honours ==
As coach

Ghana women's national under-15 football team

- CAF African Schools Football Championship
  - Champions: 2025

Individual

- Ghana Football Awards
  - Coach of the Year nomination: 2025
