= Agogo Presbyterian College of Education =

Teacher training college in Agogo, Ghana

- Established: 1931
- Affiliations: Government of Ghana
- Location: Agogo, Ashanti-Akim North Municipal District, AN0006, Ghana; 6.79320°N 1.08847°W
- Language: English
- Region Zone: Ashanti; Ashanti / Brong Ahafo
- Short name: APCE
- Source: An Atlas of The Forty Colleges of Education in Ghana.

Agogo Presbyterian College of Education is a teacher education college in Agogo (Asante-Akim North Municipal District, Ashanti Region, Ghana). The college is located in Ashanti / Brong Ahafo zone. It is one of the about 40 public colleges of education in Ghana. The college participated in the DFID-funded T-TEL programme. It was established in 1931 by the Basel Mission with the aim of training women teachers for the Girls Middle School. It has been a tertiary level institution since 2007.

== History ==
Agogo Presbyterian Women's College of Education (Basel Mission Women's Training College) was founded in1931, by the Basel Mission. The first principal of the college was Miss Helena Schlatter. She worked with Rev. Buechner and Miss Gertrude Goetz in the pioneering days of the college. The college was established to train Ghanaian women teachers for the Girls Middle School which was opened in 1931. The women teachers were trained not only to become good teachers, but good parents and leaders in society. The students were subjected to proverbial ‘Presbyterian Discipline’ to ensure that high academic and moral standards were set and maintained. In 1942, during the World War II, the military took over the college which rendered the students being sent to Akropong Seminary to continue their course. They were brought back in 1943. In 1950, the Presbyterian Church took over the college, and renamed it Agogo Presbyterian Women's Training College. The college offered the following programmes to produce the type of teachers the country needed for the basic school:

- Certificate 'A' course
- Certificate 'B' course
- Post 'B' course
- Post-Secondary course

In 2004, the three-year Diploma in Basic Education was introduced. Agogo Presbyterian Training College has been given accreditation to the tertiary level of education since September, 2007. 10 male students were admitted for the first time 1976, thus, making it a coeducational institution. The name of the college then changed to Agogo Presbyterian Training College. The enrollment of male students could not be sustained due to accommodation crisis.

The college contributed to education of women, thus, harnessing talents and potentials for national development. Graduates from the college have served in various capacities. Infrastructural facilities have been expanded and upgraded to some extent enhance access and participation of women in tertiary education.

=== The college has come under the administration of the following principals ===
Name	Years served
Miss Helena Schlatter	1931-1937
Miss Gertrude Hofer-Goetz	1939-1945
Dr. Gertrude Juzi	1950-1954
Miss Frieda Mischer	1954-1957
Dr. Beatrice Jenny	1958-1961
. Miss Grace Boafo	1962-1965
Miss Vida Anno-Kwakye	1972-1985
Mrs. Esther Joyce Acquah	1985-1991
Mrs. Akua Debrah	1991-1993
