= Sun Sherif =

2026 EP by Black Sherif

Sun Sherif is an extended play by Ghanaian singer and rapper Black Sherif, released on 3 September 2026 through Road Boys Association (RBA) and Empire. The six-track project follows his second studio album, Iron Boy (2025). It features AratheJay and the Trinidad and Tobago duo Full Blown.

== Background and release ==
Black Sherif announced the project on 28 August 2026, revealing the title Sun Sherif Vol. 1 and a release date of 4 September. Sophia Nnadozie of Deeds noted the "Vol. 1" framing suggested a project released in installments, with little pre-release promotion beyond the announcement. The EP followed Iron Boy (2025), which featured Fireboy DML and Seyi Vibez, and his guest appearance on Davido's 2026 album Oriadé.

In an interview with The Native, he said the EP reflected the music he wanted to make at the start of his career, describing a "freeness" around its creation.

Sun Sherif was released on 3 September 2026 through Road Boys Association and Empire. NotJustOk described the EP as a surprise release leaning into a "theatrical street-sermon style" rather than radio-friendly Afropop. It runs approximately 15 minutes across six tracks.

== Reception ==
Writing for The Critical Registrar, Emmanuel Daraloye gave the EP 4 out of 5, describing it as R&B-inflected and confessional, while Yinoluwa Olowofoyeku of Afrocritik rated Sun Sherif 7.6 out of 10, praising its production and Black Sherif's more melodic vocal performances. TJ Martins of Album Talks gave the EP 7.8 out of 10, praising the songwriting and vocal delivery while criticizing its track sequencing and the abrupt departure from the Afro-drill sound of his earlier albums. The review called "Forever" arguably the EP's best track.

NotJustOk characterized the production as a blend of highlife-inflected trap, orchestral arrangement and dark acoustic textures, with Black Sherif rapping and singing across Twi, English and Pidgin.

== Track listing ==
Per Spotify:

No.	Title	Length
1.	"Expresso"	2:09
2.	"Run Around"	2:11
3.	"Forever" (featuring AratheJay)	3:16
4.	"Jolie"	2:48
5.	"Frontline"	2:56
6.	"Love Again" (featuring Full Blown)	2:35
Total length:		15:55

== Personnel ==
Credits adapted from Pulse Ghana and the Trinidad and Tobago Guardian.

- Black Sherif – vocals, songwriting
- AratheJay – featured vocals (track 3)
- Full Blown (Kevon Hart and Kory Hart) – featured vocals (track 6)
- Phillip Nyanor – production (track 1)
- Joker Nharnah (Joshua Aime Adjei) – production (tracks 2, 4–6)
- Westen – production (track 3)
- Joshua Moszi - guitarist (track 4)
