= Yaw Osafo-Maafo =

Ghanaian politician

Hon. Yaw Osafo-Maafo

Member of Parliament for Akim Oda
- In office 7 January 1997 – 7 January 2009
- Preceded by: Nana Boaten-Abora
- Succeeded by: Yaw Owusu-Boateng
- Majority: 23,461

Senior Minister
- Incumbent
- Assumed office 21 January 2017

Minister for Finance and Economic Planning
- In office February 2001 – 7 January 2005
- Succeeded by: Kwadwo Baah Wiredu

Minister for Education and Sports
- In office February 2005 – April 2006
- President: John Kufuor
- Preceded by: Kwadwo Baah Wiredu
- Succeeded by: Papa Owusu-Ankomah

Personal details
- Party: New Patriotic Party
- Profession: Banker, Consultant & Politician

Yaw Osafo-Maafo is a Ghanaian politician who was appointed in April as the senior presidential advisor to the Akufo-Addo Administration 2021. He was Senior Minister in the Akufo-Addo Administration from 2017 to 2021. He was Member of Parliament for Akim Oda from 1997 to 2009, and previously served as Finance Minister and in other cabinet roles in the Kufuor Administration between 2001 and 2009.

== Early life ==
Yaw Osafo-Maafo was born in Akyem Awisa in 1936. He attended Akyem Awisa Presbyterian School and Achimota School. He went on to study Mechanical Engineering at the Kwame Nkrumah University of Science and Technology (KNUST), Ghana. At KNUST, he was the Vice President of the National Union of Ghana Students (NUGS).

He joined the Volta Aluminium Company (VALCO) as an engineer and rose through the ranks to become the CEO.

Osafo-Maafo established his credentials in the banking and finance sector by heading and successfully restructuring two major Ghanaian banks, the Bank for Housing and Construction, and the National Investment Bank between 1979 and 1992.

He consulted for the World Bank, the African Development Bank and the United Nations Development Programme. He is the past vice-president of the executive committee of the West African Bankers' Association, and a founding Deputy Chairman of the Ghana Stock Exchange.

He served as chairman and a board member on a number of corporations including Nestle Ghana Limited, National Trust Holding Company, Merchant Bank Ghana Limited, National Development Planning Commission, Divestiture Implementation Committee and Donewell Insurance. He stepped down after serving as a Member of Parliament for Akim Oda Constituency in the Eastern Region of Ghana, for three terms. He is a fellow of the Ghana Institution of Engineers and an Honorary Fellow of the Ghana Institute of Architects.

== Positions in government ==
=== Member of parliament ===
He is a former Member of Parliament for Akim Oda, Ghana.

=== Minister for Finance and Economic Planning ===
He was appointed Minister of Finance in February 2001 and later Minister of Finance and Economic Planning during the Kufuor Administration. He held this position until January 2005. At the Ministry of Finance he oversaw the dramatic turnaround of the Ghanaian economy. In November 2001, he was named Finance Minister of the year with his Canadian counterpart Paul Martin by the World Economic Forum and Finance Minister of the year 2001, Africa, by Banker Magazine, a Financial Times publication.

=== Minister for Education and Sports ===
Between 2005 and 2006 he was Minister of Education and Sports, where he commenced the implementation of major education sector reforms aimed at improving the quality of basic, secondary and tertiary education. The reforms also sought to align the education system with the needs of the broader economy. He implemented the new free basic education referred to as the Capitation Grant.

With respect to sports, his reorganization and restructuring of the finances and management of football in the country played a significant part in helping Ghana qualify for the 2006 World Cup. This was the first time Ghana had done so in her history.

== Elections ==
Marfo was first elected into Parliament on the ticket of the New Patriotic Party during the December 1996 Ghanaian General Elections for the Akim Oda Constituency in the Eastern Region of Ghana. He polled 26,685 votes out of the 44,794 valid votes cast representing 48.80% over his opponents Boateng Abora who polled 16,984 votes, Yaw Frempong Awuku who polled 750 votes, Willie De-Graft Sakyi who polled 375 votes, and Samuel Daves-Adjepong who polled 0 votes. In the 2000 Ghanaian General Elections, he polled 25,709 votes out of the 41,950 valid votes cast representing 61.30% over his opponents Kojo Atta-Krah an NDC member who polled 14,766 votes representing 35.20%, George Ntiamoah an IND member who polled 687 votes representing 1.60%, Abor Mensa a CPP member who polled 342 votes representing 0.80%, Sarkodie Kwame Peter a NRP member who polled 224 votes representing 0.50% and Adamu Salifu Yahuza a PNC member who polled 222 votes representing 0.50%. He was re-elected in 2004 with 36,729 votes out of the 50,734 valid votes cast representing 72.40% over his opponents Kwasi Nkansah Amaniapong who polled 13,268 votes, Adamu Salifu Yahuza a PNC member who polled 386 votes and Abora Mensah who also polled 351 votes.

== Recent activities ==
Although no longer serving in the government, Osafo-Maafo campaigned for the New Patriotic Party in the 2008 runoff elections.

Osafo-Maafo in more recent times worked as a consultant for the World Bank advising the Ministry of Finance and the Legislature of the government of Liberia.

Since leaving the government, he has been critical of Ghana's government on issues such as the salaries paid to government officials and the proposed sale of Achimota Forest.

He has also been very critical of the government's handling of the economy, the country's increasing debt burden and the depreciating currency.

== Controversies ==
=== Ethnocentric comments ===
In February 2015, a secret audio tape capturing a male voice resembling that of Osafo-Maafo expressing ethnocentric comments in the Asante dialect went viral in the media and on the internet. The recording was done during a meeting between the former Finance Minister and the New Patriotic Party's Council of Elders in the Eastern region of Ghana. The voice bemoaned why Ghana's' resources are benefited also by regions that have little or no resources.

"You have all the resources, but you have no say in the management of your resources, and that is what is happening. Your development depends on the one who has no resources" the voice said. The comments are thought to have been directed toward Northerners and President John Dramani Mahama in particular who is a Gonja by tribe. He cautioned that such sentiments should not be said in public "You can’t say this openly, We should not", but added that "Council members are at liberty to talk about it only among Asantes".

In his defense, Osafo-Maafo told the media "he remembers speaking at a forum not too long ago but doubts if the alleged content of the tape is representative of all that he said there."

== See also ==
- New Patriotic Party politicians
- Discrimination in Ghana
