= Maame Sarfoah Appiah =

Ghanaian Politician

Municipal Chief Executive of Asante-Akim South Municipal Assembly
- Incumbent
- Assumed office 2025
- Appointed by: President of Ghana

Personal details
- Born: Ghana
- Party: National Democratic Congress
- Known for: First female Municipal Chief Executive of Asante-Akim South

Maame Sarfoah Appiah is a Ghanaian politician and public servant. She currently holds the position of Municipal Chief Executive (MCE) of the Asante-Akim South Municipal Assembly in the Ashanti Region of Ghana. She was appointed in May 2024 and sworn in in 2025, making her the first woman to assume this position since the creation of the district and the decentralization of the country in 1988.

== Early life and political career ==
Maame Sarfoah Appiah has been an active politician in grassroots politics, especially in the Ashanti Region of Ghana. Prior to her appointment, she was a prominent figure and member of the National Democratic Congress (NDC) in the country.

Maame Sarfoah Appiah contested for a parliamentary seat in the Asante-Akim South Constituency twice on the ticket of the NDC. Unfortunately, she did not win, but her hard work and commitment to the grassroots earned her recognition and respect from the people of the region. Her in-depth knowledge of the problems affecting the people of the region was crucial in preparing her for this position in the local government.

== Appointment ==
In an attempt to promote gender inclusion in the country's local governance, Maame Sarfoah Appiah was nominated by the president of the Republic of Ghana to lead the Asante-Akim South Municipal Assembly.

Maame Sarfoah Appiah's nomination was put to a vote by the General Assembly on May 15, 2025. She garnered 59 out of 66 votes from members present in the assembly, representing 89% of the total votes. The high number of votes was from members of different political parties and was largely hailed by various groups, including women, traditional leaders, and the youth, who converged at the assembly grounds to witness this historic moment.
