= Trey La =

Ghanaian musician, writer, and social activist

Personal details
- Born: Charles Selorm Dumenu; November 23, 1986 (age 39) Hohoe
- Education: Kwame Nkrumah University of Science and Technology; University of Education, Winneba; Kumasi Technical University
- Profession: Musician, writer, and social activist

Charles Selorm Dumenu (born on November 23, 1986), popularly known as Trey La, is a Ghanaian musician, writer, and social activist. He became well known on TV when he became a finalist of The Next Big Thing in GH Hip-Hop, a TV rap competition on GH One TV in 2012.

== Early life and education ==
Trey La was born in Hohoe, in Ghana's Volta Region, and was raised by his late paternal grandparents, Mr. R.G.K. Dumenu and Paulina Dumenu. His grandfather was an educator. Trey La began his education at Kabore School Complex in Ho and attended Bishop Herman College in Kpando for his secondary education. He earned his first degree from the University of Education, Winneba, in the Central Region. He later pursued a Master of Business Administration in Logistics and Supply Chain Management at Kwame Nkrumah University of Science and Technology in the Ashanti Region. He also holds an HND in Secretaryship and Management Studies from Kumasi Technical University.

== Career ==
Trey La is a Ghanaian rapper and recording artist. He began his music career with a focus on rap before briefly transitioning into the banking sector, where he worked with Stanbic Bank. In 2011, released the single One Man Army, featuring King Fad and produced by Ghanaian musician E.L. The song featured rap verses in eight Ghanaian dialects.

He gained further recognition through his participation in The Rising Stars of GH Mixtape Album, an annual compilation project curated by Ghanaian-American producer Coptic. The mixtape series featured prominent Ghanaian musicians such as Sarkodie, Samini, Stonebwoy, Kwaw Kese, M.anifest, and C-Real. In 2014, Coptic signed Trey La, leading to the release of The Introduction Mixtape Album. Work subsequently began on his debut studio album, Graaaduation, which featured collaborations with artists from other Africa countries and the United States.

Trey La's discography includes The Introduction Mixtape Album, Passive Religionist, Graaarmy Vol. 1, and the Locally Acquired Foreign Accents (LAFA) EP, The Money Trey EP, Big Things Start Small EP and recently released Kevin Ekow Taylor EP which got a reaction from the controversial broadcaster Kevin Taylor. Trey La has released many singles and has collaborated with several Ghanaian and international artists, including French-Ghanaian singer Bibie Brew.

He has also worked with a range of international producers, including Coptic, Oshea (noted for work with Destiny's Child), BD Records (Palestine), DJ Pain 1 (known for productions with Young Jeezy), Anno Domini (associated with 50 Cent), and Legend Beats (linked to Kendrick Lamar).

In addition to his music, Trey La released The Money Trey, a book and EP sharing the same title. He is regarded as the first Ghanaian artist to release a book and an album centered on a common theme. He is also considered the second artist in Africa to combine a book and music project, following Nigerian musician Burna Boy, who released a comic book alongside his African Giant album.
