= Nana Akuoko Sarpong =

Ghanaian traditional ruler, politician and lawyer (1938–2026)

Kwame Akuoko Sarpong, CV
- Agogohene

Paramount Chief of Agogo
- Reign: 1976 to 2026
- Investiture: 1976
- Predecessor: Kwaku Duah

Member of the Ghana Parliament for Asante-Akim North
- In office 1979–1981
- President: Hilla Limann
- Preceded by: Emmanuel Kwasi Addae
- Succeeded by: Collins Agyarko Nti

Secretary for Chieftaincy Affairs
- In office 1992–1993
- President: Jerry Rawlings

Secretary for Internal Affairs
- In office 1991–1992
- President: Jerry Rawlings
- Preceded by: Nii Okaidja Adamafio
- Succeeded by: Emmanuel Osei-Owusu

Secretary for Health
- In office 1988–1991
- President: Jerry Rawlings
- Preceded by: F. W. K. Klutse
- Succeeded by: Stephen Obimpeh

Personal details
- Born: 11 August 1938 Agogo, Ashanti, Gold Coast
- Died: 26 March 2026 (aged 87) Ghana
- Citizenship: Ghanaian
- Education: Accra Academy; Opoku Ware School; University of Ghana; Ghana Institute of Management and Public Administration

Nana Kwame Akuoko Sarpong, CV (11 August 1938 – 26 March 2026) was a Ghanaian traditional ruler, politician and lawyer. He was the paramount chief or Omanhene of the Agogo Traditional Area of Ghana. Sarpong served as Secretary for Health (Minister for Health), Secretary for Internal Affairs (Minister for the Interior) and Secretary for Chieftaincy Affairs (Minister for Chieftaincy and Religious Affairs) in the PNDC government. He also served as a member of the council of state in the fourth Republic.

== Early life and education ==
Nana Kwame Akuoko Sarpong was born on 11 August 1938 at Agogo, Ashanti, Gold Coast. He started his primary education at the Methodist and Presbyterian Primary Schools, Agogo. In 1954, he gained admission into the Accra Academy. His contemporaries included Edward Utuka, who was executed with Ignatius Acheampong by the AFRC in 1979. Sarpong obtained his Cambridge School Certificate in 1957. He enrolled at Opoku Ware School in 1958 where he was one of the members of the first batch of sixth form students that enrolled at the school. He obtained his Cambridge Higher School Certificate in 1959.

He gained admission into the University of Ghana to pursue courses in economics, sociology, law and political science. He graduated in 1963 with a Bachelor of Arts degree. At the university, he was a member of the editorial board of the Echo, (a weekly Magazine of the Commonwealth Hall), secretary of the Junior Common Room, secretary of the Commonwealth Hall Union, a member of the Commonwealth Hall Debating Society and also tutor of the University of Ghana Dancing Club. In 1963, he pursued a post graduate law program at the University of Ghana and obtained his LLB (Hons) in 1965. Some of his contemporaries included Tawia Modibo Ocran whom he contested against to win the JCR Presidency of the Commonwealth Hall in the previous year; 1964. In 1965, he entered the Ghana Institute of Management and Public Administration (GIMPA), Green hill to study Public Administration. At GIMPA, he was the president of the Students Representative Council (SRC) and also acting president of the National Union of Ghana Students (NUGS). He graduated in 1965 and was called to the Ghana Bar that same year in October.

== Career ==
In 1966, he served as a public prosecutor (assistant state attorney) in the office of the Attorney General and Minister of Justice, Cape Coast, Central Region (Ghana). He resigned a year later to enter private legal practice in the Law Firm of E.M.A. Ablor & Co., Cape Coast and later became a senior partner and founding member of the Law Firm of Forson, Sarpong & Co. with offices in Cape Coast and Takoradi. Between 1967 and 1969, he was elected as the Secretary and later President of the Central Region Bar Association and served on the executive board of the Ghana Bar Association. From 1970 to 1972, he served on the board of various institutions including; Graphic Corporation, Aggrey Memorial Secondary School, Cape Coast, the Ghana Bar Association and was also a member of the Ghana Police Council. In 1972, he was the deputy secretary of the Ghana Bar Association. He became a Senior Member in the law firm; Nana Sarpong, Ahenkora and Co., he was also member of the Ghana Law Reform Commission in 1988.

== Politics ==
In 1967, he joined John Bilson and Obed Asamoah to found the Third Force Party for the 1969 elections. The party could not begin operations as Asamoah joined Komla Agbeli Gbedemah's National Alliance of Liberals and subsequently got elected to represent the Biakoye District of the Volta Region in the erstwhile Second Republic which was led by Kofi Abrefa Busia. He became the General Secretary of the Republican Party (founded by P.K.K Quaidoo, a former minister in the Nkrumah regime) but later joined the Progress Party before the 1969 General Election and subsequently became an executive member of the Progress Party.

In 1979, when Ghana returned to constitutional rule, Nana was invited by Victor Owusu, a long time friend who eventually led the Popular Front Party, to stand and run for parliament on the ticket of the Popular Front Party. He accepted the invitation and he was elected a member of parliament representing the Asante-Akim North in the Ashanti Region. He became the minority front bench spokesman on defence and interior and also member of the parliamentary select committee on defence and interior.

The 31 December 1981 coup d'état resulted in Nana's political detention at Nsawam prison. In 1982 and 1984, he twice declined invites from the PNDC. Efforts by Justice Daniel Francis Annan who used their mutual love for sports, their legal profession and their Accra Academy background to get him on board also proved futile. It was the efforts of his former political colleague, Obed Asamoah, which succeeded in making him join the government of the PNDC in 1988. He informed John Kufuor; his former parliamentary colleague and later president of the Republic of Ghana and Victor Owusu about the invitation to be a PNDC secretary of which they both welcomed. That same year he was appointed the Secretary for Health. During his tenure as health secretary he was the leader of the delegation representing Ghana at the Conference of the Commonwealth Health Ministers held in Melbourne, Australia. That same year he led Ghana's delegation to the World Health Organization Conference in Geneva, Switzerland. He was Chairman of the Council of Ministers of the West African Health Ministers Organization.

As the acting Secretary for Foreign Affairs, he was a member of the delegation of two that visited the United States of America to normalize relations between the Government of the United States of America and Ghana after relations had grown sour between both countries in the late 1980s due to what was known as the Soussoudis affair.

In 1991, he was appointed Secretary for Internal Affairs and subsequently became a member of the National Security Council. During his tenure in office, he was the leader of the delegation at the Conference of Ministers to Combat Drug Trafficking and Money Laundering held in Versailles, near Paris.

He was acting Secretary of Foreign affairs for a second occasion and during this period he played a leading role in the transitioning of Ghana to democratic rule in 1992. His last ministerial appointment before the fourth Republic was as Secretary for Chieftaincy Affairs. After Ghana transitioned to constitutional rule his portfolio changed to; Presidential Staffer for Chieftaincy Affairs. In August 1999, he was relieved of his position as Presidential Staffer for Chieftaincy Affairs in a statement issued in Accra. The statement said the decision was intended to enable him to concentrate on his role as Chairman of the National Commission on Culture.

In 2009, he was appointed a member of the Council of State.

== Chieftaincy ==
In the early hours of 16 December 1975, Nana Kwaku Duah, the uncle of Kwame Akuoko Sarpong passed on. He was laid to rest on 22 December 1975. The next day the process of installation began and Lawyer Akuoko Sarpong was enthroned Nana Akuoko Sarpong, the Omanhene of Agogo Traditional Area at age 38. On 16 January 1976, Nana Akuoko Sarpong swore the oath of allegiance before the Asantehene, Otumfuo Opoku Ware II at the Manhyia Palace in Kumasi. Otumfuo at the ceremony said to the people of Agogo,

"Now you have got a chief you deserve, a well-educated and brilliant lawyer. Hold him tight".

== Sports ==
Sarpong was captain of the school football team and athletics team at primary level. He was a member of the Accra Academy sports team as a hockey player and football player. He also played football at Opoku Ware School. At the University of Ghana, he was a member of the school's tennis club and the captain of the GIMPA tennis club. He was chairman of the Central Regional Sports Council and also chairman of the Venomous Vipers Football Club, Cape Coast. He was later vice-chairman of the Ghana Football Association and also chairman of the Cape Coast Hills Club, a Sporting Association in Cape Coast. He thrice served as chairman of the Accra Great Olympics F.C. management committee. He was a trustee and patron of the Accra Lawn Tennis Club and also patron of the Ghana Athletics Association.

== Death ==
Sarpong died in Ghana on 26 March 2026, at the age of 87.

== See also ==
- Agogo, Ghana
- Council of State (Ghana)
- Minister for the Interior (Ghana)
- Minister for Health (Ghana)
- Provisional National Defence Council
- List of MPs elected in the 1979 Ghanaian parliamentary election
