= Daughters of Glorious Jesus =

Ghanaian gospel group

- Born: 1989 (age 36–37)
- Origin: Ghanaian
- Genre: Gospel
- Occupations: Singers, songwriters, preachers
- Instrument: Vocals
- Years active: (1989–present)
- Members: Cynthia Appiadu; Edna Sarpong; Monica Owusu Ansah

Daughters of Glorious Jesus (DoG-J) is a veteran Ghanaian gospel group formed in 1989. The musical group is composed of Cynthia Appiadu, Edna Sarpong and Monica Owusu Ansah. They sing in English and Twi. With over fifty songs DoG-J are recognised as having the most number of songs by a Ghanaian Gospel Artist. They released their maiden album Anwanwa Do in 1990, which gained them prominence throughout Ghana. As of 2019, they had released 12 albums. The trio celebrated their 30th Anniversary in the Ghanaian music industry in 2019.

== History ==
=== 1989–1999: Formation, maiden album and popularity ===
"We went to the crusade grounds and on our return, our canoe tipped over and we fell into the Black Volta, none of us knew how to swim, and we were without life jackets, some church members at the river bank went to the town to call some divers to save us, but before they came, we had swallowed a lot of water,"

— Cynthia Appiadu on some of the challenges they faced in the 1990's

Daughters Of Glorious Jesus started as part of the choir of Resurrection Power and Living Bread Ministries then headed by the Rev. Akwasi Amoako in 1987. Later, the General Overseer of the Church, Bishop Akwasi Asare Bediako, saw their potential and encouraged them to form a group in 1989. The group proceeded to sing at church crusades and conventions. In 1990, their first album ‘Anwanwa Din’ was released.

In 1991, they released ‘Mebo Yesu Din Daa’ which won them the Entertainment and Critics Association of Ghana award for Best Gospel Group in 1992. They followed it up with a remix of their maiden album, ‘Anwanwa Din’. DoG-J released ‘Mesom Awurade Daa’ in 1994. This album won Appiadu their award for Best Female Vocalist Award in 1996.

Daughters Of Glorious Jesus then released ‘Asomdwe Hene, and ‘Ngyae Mpae Bo Da’, which featured Sarpong as the lead vocalist. In 1996, they released Asomdwe Hene album. In an interview in May 2019, they recounted how before of that album they nearly died whilst on a crusade with Resurrection Power and Living Bread Ministry in Walewale in the then Northern Region, they nearly drowned in the Black Volta after a canoe they occupied tipped over, fortunately for them they were saved by divers from a nearby town.

=== 2000–2010: Continuous success, prime years and Aseda album ===
In 2000, the hit album ‘Nea yehu’ was released. The album got the group nominations at the 2001 Ghana Music Awards, and 2003 Ghana Gospel Music Awards. The 2003 GGMA named DoG-J as the Best Small Ministering Group. In 2003, they released their most successful album, ‘Aseda’. All eight tracks on the album enjoyed massive airplay. The album won the group at a ceremony in Accra the Our Music Award for 2003.

In 2004, ‘Aseda’ swept five awards at the Ghana Music Awards, the most to have been won by a gospel artist on one awards night. It was also the first time a gospel artist won any of the three top awards. With ‘Aseda’, DoG-J took two awards at the 2004 Ghana Gospel Music Awards. The video for ‘Bebre’ won them the Best Gospel Video Award at the 2010 4syte Music Video awards. In 2007, they came out with ‘Daughters’ Praise’ vol. 1 and 2, which comprised revised renditions of some of their old songs. In 2009, the ‘Trimude’ album was released.

=== 2011–present: After prime years ===
==== Glorious 30 anniversary ====
In 2019, the trio launched their 30th anniversary to mark 3 decades of starting their musical career and the impact their ministry had made of lives dubbed the Glorious 30 anniversary, as part of the anniversary the group celebrated with activities including a gala dubbed the Glorious 30 Gala Glorious 30 Gala and Dinner, concerts across the country including DaughtersTribute Concert, musical tours across Ghana dubbed Glorious 30 Tour, sanitation campaigns, orphanages visits and others. By 2020, they had released 12 albums.

In July 2026, Daughters of Glorious Jesus announced an initiative to revive some of their classic gospel songs to introduce them to younger audiences, particularly Generation Z. As part of the project, the group said it would produce music videos for several older songs that were originally released without accompanying visuals. According to the group, the initiative aims to preserve their musical legacy and make their music more accessible to a new generation.

== Notable songs ==
Daughters Of Glorious Jesus' songs include Odo ben ni, Ene manya enigye, Yewo Yesu bi, Yesu fata Ayeyi, Aseda Ben (from the Mesom Awurade Daa album) Fawasem to Awurade anim, Ben Awurade, Okasapreko, Nea yehu, Asomdwee Hene, Towoboase, Onokwafo Nyame, Yesu fata Ayeyi, Yeyi w’aye, Yewo Yesu bi, Hwan koraa na ote se wo, Oteeneeni, Onam ne wuo so, He paid the Debt, I have Decided to Follow Jesus, Jesus is King, Wo ntaban, Aseda Ben (from the Aseda album), Bebree, Odomfo, Yesu mo, Ahintabea, Agya woso, Adedie, Obi dowo, Onyame wo ho, Meda w’oase, and Osaberima kese.

== Group composition ==
The Daughters Of Glorious Jesus group is an all-female trio group which consists of Cynthia Appiadu as the lead singer, Edna Sarpong and Monica Owusu Ansah.

Daughters Of Glorious Jesus is known for its three part harmony. Appiadu, the lead vocalist, is a soprano with a wide vocal range. She also plays the drum, and other traditional musical instruments. She also writes and composes most of their songs. DoG-J sings in both Twi and English.

DoG-J performs with a live band on stage, and sometimes a cappella. They are known for their funky style, and ability to fuse highlife with the western style of music.

== Other ventures ==
=== Priseine Hub record label ===
In October 2020, they signed the first artist to their record label Priseine Hub Ltd. The new artist is Afia Sika, who had supported the group as a backing vocalist for 15 years.

=== Our Story ===
The group launched a book titled ''Our Story'' in September 2019. The Bible, which encapsulates their journey to stardom, has 229 pages and features nine chapters has nine chapters, titled; Five Little Voices, Resurrection Power, The Mentor, Don’t Mind for T’adi, The Wonderful Name, All things Shall Be Added, Light Affliction, These Signs Shall Follow Them and Besides Every Successful Woman.

=== Daughters 3 Foundation ===
As part of the groups anniversary the group launched a foundation called the Daughters 3 Foundation, a non-governmental organization (NGO) to help the less privileged in the society.

== Personal life ==
All three of the members are married and are Christians who worship as Charismatics. They attributed their success to God and support from their husbands. The trio have also in many ways mentioned the Ministers of God, Bishop Akwasi Asare Bediako, Rev. Akwasi Amoako and his wife as the key people who mentored them and even named their group.

== Discography ==
=== Studio albums ===
By 2020 he trio had released 12 albums;

- Anwanwa Din (1990)
- Yesu Mebo Wo Din Daa (1991)
- Anwanwa Din remix (1992)
- Mesom Awurade Daa (1994)
- Ngyae Mpaebo (1995)
- Asomdwe Hene (1996)
- Nea Yehu Yi(2000)
- Aseda (2003)
- Daughters' Praise Vol. 1 & 2 (2007)
- Trimude (2009)
- Wonnim a Ennye Yie (2014)
- Abba Father (2017)

== Honors ==
In March 2021, the group were honored by the organizers of 3Music Awards in an event called 3Music Women's Brunch. They were honored for their accomplishments in the entertainment industry along with Theresa Ayoade, Grace Omaboe, Akosua Adjepong, Dzifa Gomashie, Tagoe Sisters, Asabea Cropper and others.
