= Take Care of Yourself Blacko =

EP by Black Sherif
- Released: 10 August 2023
- Recorded: 2023
- Genre: Highlife; Ghanaian drill
- Length: 6:11
- Label: Blacko Management; Empire
- Producer: Samsney Nhareh; Joker Nhareh

Black Sherif chronology
The Villain I Never Was (2022)	Take Care of Yourself Blacko (2023)	Iron Boy (2025)

Take Care of Yourself Blacko is an extended play by Ghanaian rapper Black Sherif, released on 10 August 2023 through Blacko Management and Empire. The EP consist of two singles: "Yaya" (stylized in all caps) and "Simmer Down".

== Background ==
Take Care of Yourself Blacko was released on 10 August 2023. The EP's release comes after the success of his debut album, The Villain I Never Was.

== Composition ==
The EP is produced by Samsney and Joker Nhareh, close collaborators of Black Sherif. "Yaya" explores Frimpong's attempt at healing and having faith as he sings through the perspective of his alter ego. "Simmer Down" is a blend of soul, drill, and highlife which reminds the artist to stay optimistic despite facing hate.

== Track listing ==
All tracks are written by Mohammed Ismail Sherif Kwaku Frimpong.

Take Care of Yourself Blacko track listing
No.	Title	Length
1.	"Yaya"	3:13
2.	"Simmer Down"	2:58
Total length:		6:11

Notes

- "Yaya" is stylized in all caps.
