= Black Sherif =

Ghanaian musician (born 2002)

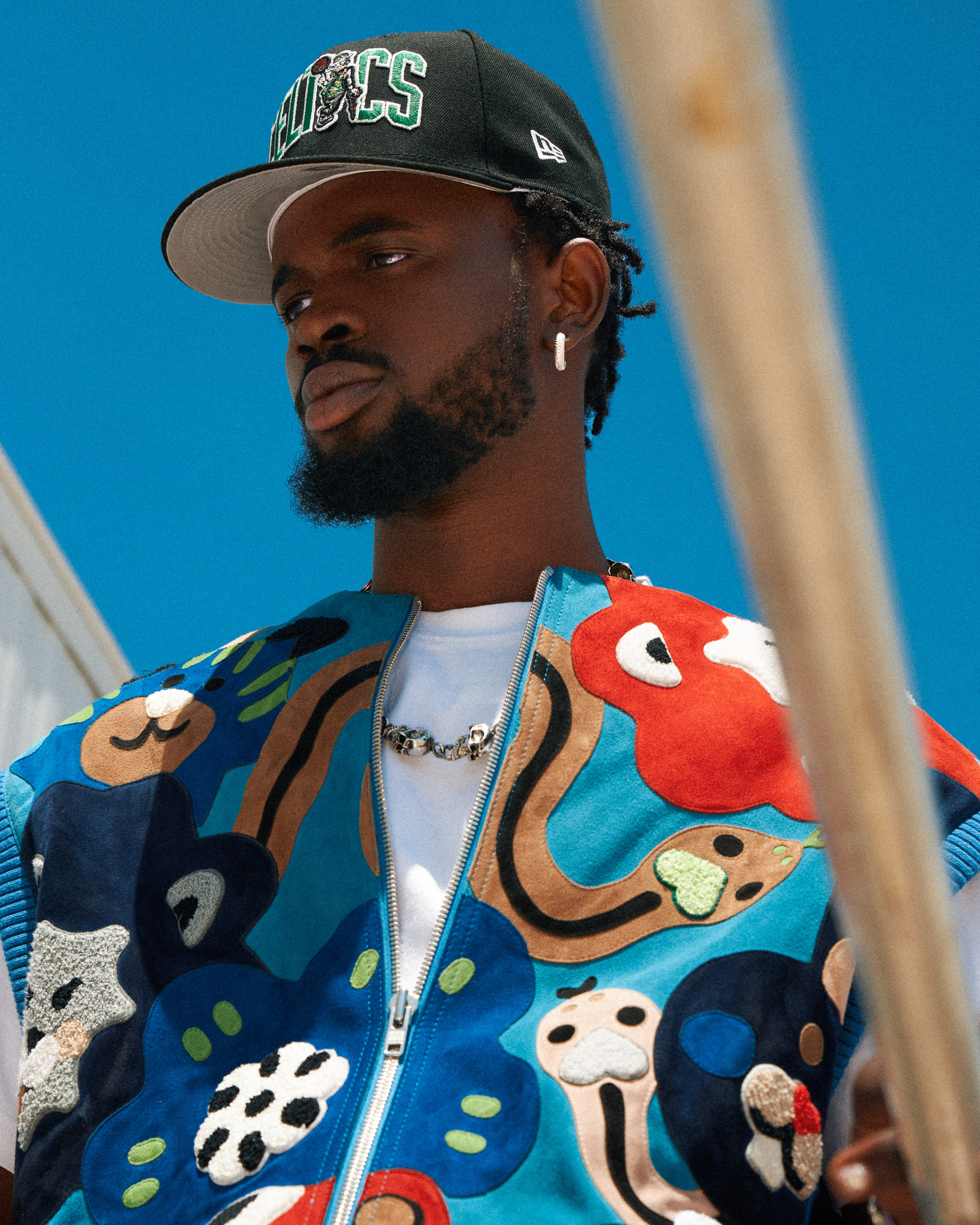
- Sherif in 2023

Background information
- Also known as: Blacko, Kwaku Frimpong, Kwaku Killa, Iron Boy
- Born: Mohammed Ismail Sherif; 9 January 2002 (age 24); Konongo, Ghana
- Genres: Highlife; Afrobeats; hip hop; reggae; drill music
- Occupations: Singer; rapper; model
- Instrument: Voice
- Years active: 2019–present
- Labels: Road Boys Association; Empire

Mohammed Ismail Sherif (born 9 January 2002), professionally known as Black Sherif and formerly Blacko, is a Ghanaian singer, rapper and fashion model. He initially gained popularity in 2021 with his song "First Sermon," which he released in May 2021. This was followed up with the "Second Sermon" in July 2021.

His breakthrough came in March 2022 with his hit single "Kwaku the Traveller," which reached Number 1 on the Ghanaian and Nigerian Apple Music charts. He then released his debut album, The Villain I Never Was, on 5 October 2022. His sophomore album, Iron Boy, was released on 3 April 2025.

In May 2025, he was nominated in the 2025 BET Awards.

== Early life and education ==
Mohammed Ismail Sherif was born and raised in Konongo-Zongo, in the Ashanti Region of Ghana. As both his parents worked mostly overseas, he started living with his aunt and other extended family members at the age of 10. His nomadic lifestyle exposed him to multiple influences and different cultures at a very early age.

Sherif attended Konongo Zongo Islamic Basic School and later Pinamang Educational Complex, where he graduated junior high school. He completed his secondary education at Kumasi Academy. He was a member of the Literary Group under the students' representative council, where he picked up an interest in music and dancing. Black Sherif has also partnered with Italian sports wear brand ellesse.

A former student of the University of Professional Studies, he was studying at the University of Ghana as of October 2022.

== Career ==
Black Sherif began his career in 2019 with the release of his song "Cry for Me" on YouTube. After this, he released another single titled "Mariana" on November 9,2019, before his debut single, "Money" was released on 25 May 2020, along with a music video. In May 2021, his single "First Sermon" was released, further increasing his audience. The song's sequel, "Second Sermon," was released in July and received a remix with fellow African artist Burna Boy.

Black Sherif's breakthrough came in March 2022 with his single "Kwaku the Traveller," which reached Number 1 on the Ghanaian and Nigerian Apple Music charts and became his most popular song. He released his debut album, The Villain I Never Was, in October, supported by the singles "45" and "Soja".

Black Sherif has worked on songs by Sarkodie, Smallgod, Tory Lanez, Ardee, Bas, Stormzy, Amerado, DJ Breezy, Larry Gaaga and others.

In August 2022, Black Sherif was named "Up Now" by music streaming service Audiomack. "I've had Audiomack since high school," Black Sherif told Audiomack. "It was the first platform that I used and convinced my friends to listen to my music. It was easier, and it looked professional. It's been the primary thing for me to connect with my fans and share music."

Black Sherif performed at the 25th anniversary of the Music of Black Origin (MOBO) Awards, which took place at the OVO Arena in Wembley, London. In December 2022, he hosted his debut concert, the " Zaama Disco Concert," in Accra.

On 20 February 2023, Black Sherif won the Best Hip Hop award at the Soundcity MVP Awards, which were held at the Eko Convention Centre in Lagos. He played the Palladium Times Square in New York City on 20 May.

Since March 2023, Black Sherif has performed at the Wireless Festival in Abu Dhabi, the Something in the Water Festival in Virginia Beach and Afronation Miami. He is the first Ghanaian to perform at the Wireless Festival in the UK.

On July 31, 2026, Black Sherif was featured on the track "Amazing Grace," the second song on Nigerian singer Davido's sixth studio album, Oriadé. Black Sherif was the only Ghanaian artist featured on the 13-track project, which otherwise drew collaborators from Nigeria, the United States, and France; commentators noted the pairing reflected his cross-border appeal across the Ghanaian and Nigerian music markets.

In August 2026, hosted another sold-out concert at the Hammerstein Ballroom in New York, USA. This is part of the shows he will be performing at in his announced USA music tour.

== Artistry ==
Black Sherif's music is a blend of highlife, reggae, and hip-hop, specifically UK drill, a subgenre of drill music and road rap, borrowing from the US Chicago styles that originated in Brixton, London, from 2012 onwards that are often about violent and hedonistic criminal lifestyles. Many of his lyrics are in an Akan dialect, Twi, his native tongue. He has stated his musical influences are rappers Kanye West, Travis Scott, Saint Jhn, Dave, Stormzy, J Hus, and Ghanaian artists Mugeez and Sarkodie.

== Lawsuit ==
On 11 April 2022, Shadrach Agyei Owusu (aka Snap), the CEO of Waynes Chavis Consult, filed a lawsuit against Black Sherif for breach of contract. Owusu alleged that he had invested in Black Sherif's career and that Black Sherif had signed a distribution agreement with a company named Empire in breach of a business management contract dated 18 August 2021. Owusu sought injunctive relief prohibiting Black Sherif from performing without his authorization. The case between Shadrach Agyei Owusu and Black Sherif is still pending before the Accra High Court Commercial Division (9) in Suit Number CM/0393/2022.

== Discography ==
=== Albums ===
- The Villain I Never Was (2022)
- Take Care of Yourself Blacko (double single) (2023)
- Iron Boy (2025)

=== EPs ===
- Sun Sherif

=== Singles ===
- "First Sermon" (2021)
- "Ankonam" (2021)
- "Second Sermon" (Remix) (featuring Burna Boy) (2022)
- "Kwaku the Traveller" (2022)
- "Money" (2022)
- "Soja" (2022)
- "Oh No" (2023)
- "Wotowoto Season" (featuring Odumodublvck) (2023)
- "Fallen Angel" (featuring Smallgod) (2024)
- "January 9" (2024)
- "Zero" (2024)
- "Shut Up" (2024)
- "Kilos Milos" (2024)
- "Lomo Lomo" (featuring KiDi) (2024)
- "Jesus Christ" (featuring Arathe Jay) (2024)
- "Rebel Music" (2024)
- "So It Goes" (featuring Fireboy DML) (2025)
- "PopStar" (2026)

== Awards and nominations ==
| Year | Event | Prize | Entry | Result | Ref |
|---|---|---|---|---|---|
| 2025 | BET Awards | Best International Act category | Himself | | |
| 2025 | Telecel Ghana Music Awards | Artist of the Year | Himself | Nominated | |
| 2025 | Telecel Ghana Music Awards | Best Hiplife/Hippop Artiste | Himself | Nominated | |
| 2025 | Telecel Ghana Music Awards | Best Hippop Song | Himself | Nominated | |
| 2025 | Telecel Ghana Music Awards | Best Afrobeat Song | "Lomo Lomo" - KiDi ft Himself | Nominated | |
| 2025 | Telecel Ghana Music Awards | Best Hiplife | Himself | Nominated | |
| 2025 | Telecel Ghana Music Awards | Telecel Most Popular Song | Himself | Nominated | |
| 2025 | Telecel Ghana Music Awards | Collaboration of the Year | "Lomo Lomo" - KiDi ft Himself | Won | |
| 2025 | Telecel Ghana Music Awards | Best Afropop Song | Himself | Nominated | |
| 2024 | | | | | |
| 2023 | BET Hip Hop Awards | Best International Flow | Himself | Won | |
| 2023 | Soundcity MVP Awards | Best Hip Hop | Himself | Won | |
| 2023 | Ghana Music Awards USA | Hip Hop/Hiplife Artist of the Year | Himself | Won | |
| 2023 | The Headies | West African Artiste of the Year | Himself | Won | |
| 2023 | Vodafone Ghana Music Awards | Artist of the Year | Himself | Won | |
| 2023 | Vodafone Ghana Music Awards | Best Hiphop Song of the Year | Himself | Won | |
| 2023 | Vodafone Ghana Music Awards | Best Music Video | "Konongo Zongo" | Won | |
| 2023 | Vodafone Ghana Music Awards | Most Popular Song of the Year | "Kweku the Traveller" | Won | |
| 2023 | Vodafone Ghana Music Awards | Best Collaboration of the Year | "Country Side" (with Sarkodie) | Won | |
| 2022 | Entertainment Achievement Awards | Entertainment Personality of the Year | Himself | Won | |
| 2022 | 3Music Awards | Hip Hop Song of the Year | "Second Sermon" | Won | |
| 2022 | 3Music Awards | Breakthrough Act of the Year | Himself | Won | |
| 2022 | 3Music Awards | Hip life/Hip hop Artiste of the Year | Himself | Won | |
| 2022 | 3Music Awards | Song of the Year | "Second Sermon" | Won | |
| 2022 | 3Music Awards | Artiste of the Year | Himself | Nominated | |
| 2022 | Ghana Music Awards | Artiste of the Year | Himself | Nominated | |
| 2022 | Ghana Music Awards | Vodafone Most Popular Song | "Second Sermon" | Nominated | |
| 2022 | Ghana Music Awards | Best New Artiste | Himself | Won | |
| 2022 | Ghana Music Awards | Best Hip life/Hip pop Artiste | Himself | Nominated | |
| 2022 | Ghana Music Awards | Best Hip Pop Song | "Second Sermon" | Won | |
| 2022 | Ghana Music Awards | International Collaboration of the Year | "Second Sermon Remix" (ft. Burna Boy) | Nominated | |
| 2022 | Ghana Music Awards | Male Vocal Performance of the Year | "Gold Digga" | Nominated | |
| 2022 | Ghana Music Awards UK | Artiste of the Year | Himself | Won | |

== Personal life ==
Black Sherif is a Muslim. There is little information known about his personal life.

== Zaama Disco ==
Zaama Disco is Black Sherif's annual concert, held every December since 2022.
