= Asante Akim North District =

- District
- Districts of Ashanti Region

- Location of Asante Akim North District within Ashanti
- Coordinates: 6°48′0″N 1°5′0″W
- Country: Ghana
- Region: Ashanti
- Capital: Agogo

Population (2021)
  - Total: 85,788
- Time zone: UTC+0 (Greenwich Mean Time)
  - Summer (DST): GMT

Asante Akim North District is one of the forty-three districts in Ashanti Region, Ghana. Originally it was formerly part of the then-larger and original Asante Akim North District in 1988 (capital: Konongo), which it was created from the former Asante Akim District Council. Later, it was elevated to municipal district assembly status to become Asante Akim North Municipal District in November 2007 (effectively on 29 February 2008). However, in July 2012, the northern part of the district was split off to create a new Asante Akim North District; thus the remaining part has been renamed to become Asante Akim Central Municipal District. The district assembly is located in the eastern part of Ashanti Region and has Agogo as its capital town.

== Cities list ==
- Agogo

== See also ==
- "Asante Akim North District". Statoids.
