= Kwaku the Traveller =

Single by Black Sherif

from the album The Villain I Never Was
- Released: 31 March 2022
- Genre: Drill music; pop rap
- Label: Blacko; Empire (Empire Africa)
- Songwriter: Black Sherif
- Producer: Joker Nharnah

Black Sherif singles chronology
"Second Sermon (Remix)" (2021)	"Kwaku the Traveller" (2022)

Music video
- "Kwaku The Traveller" on YouTube

"Kwaku the Traveller" is a song by Ghanaian musician Black Sherif. It was released on 31 March 2022, through Blacko, and Empire. "Kwaku the Traveller" was written by Black Sherif, and produced by Joker Nharnah. It debuted at number 1 in Nigeria TurnTable Top 50 chart, number 5 on the Billboard U.S. Afrobeats Songs Chart and number 2 on the UK Afrobeats Singles Chart. On 11 July 2022, following the launch of TurnTable Top 100, an expansion of the Top 50 chart, "Kwaku the Traveller" debut at number 22. On 14 July 2022, "Kwaku the Traveller" debut at number 2 on the newly launched Nigeria Top Hip-Hop/Rap Songs chart.

== Composition ==
Reviewing for The Fader, David Renshaw wrote, "Kwaku The Traveller" finds Sherif in full grind mode but able to acknowledge the bumps in the road he encounters on his way to making the money in his sights. As he puts it in his distinctive vocals: "Of course I fucked up. Who never fuck up hands in the air, no hands? I was young what you expect from me? It is what it is".

== Commercial performance ==
"Kwaku the Traveller" debuted at number 1 in Nigeria TurnTable Top 50 chart, number 5 on the Billboard U.S. Afrobeats Songs and number 2 on the UK Afrobeats Singles Chart. On 19 April, it debuted at number 12 on Billboard Top Triller Global. On 3 April 2022, it became the first Ghana record to top the Nigeria Apple Music Top 100, at number one, and Nigeria Turntable charts on 11 April 2022. "Kwaku the Traveller" became the most streamed song in Spotify Nigeria Charts, on 12 April 2022. "Kwaku the Traveller" is Black Sherif's second most popular record with over 2.5 million Spotify streams, and his most popular record with over 14.6 million Boomplay streams as of 20 April 2022.

== Accolades ==
Awards and nominations for "Kwaku the Traveller"
Year	Organization	Award	Result
2022	African Entertainment Awards USA	Song of the Year	Nominated
2023	Soundcity MVP Awards Festival	Best Hip-Hop	Won

== Charts ==
=== Weekly charts ===
Chart (2022)	Peak position
Nigeria Top 50 (TurnTable)	1
Nigeria Top 100 (TurnTable)	22
Nigeria Top Hip-Hop/Rap Songs (TurnTable)	2
South Africa Streaming (TOSAC)	6
UK Afrobeats (Official Charts)	2
UK Independent (Official Charts)	40
US Afrobeats Songs (Billboard)	5
Top Triller Global (Billboard)	12

=== Year-end charts ===
2022 year-end chart performance for "Kwaku the Traveller"
Chart (2022)	Position
US Afrobeats Songs (Billboard)	18

== Certifications ==
Certifications for "Kwaku the Traveller"
Region	Certification	Certified units/sales
Nigeria (TCSN)	2× Platinum	200,000^{‡}
^{‡} Sales+streaming figures based on certification alone.

== Release history ==
Release history for "Kwaku the Traveller"
Region	Date	Format	Label
Various	31 March 2022	Digital download; streaming	Blacko Management; Empire

== See also ==
- TurnTable End of the Year Top 100 of 2022
