= Amakye Dede =

Ghanaian musician

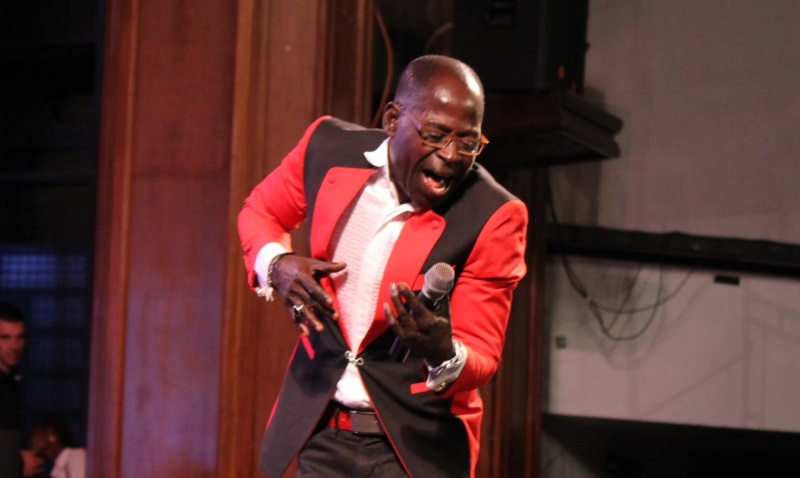
- Amakye Dede

Background information
- Also known as: Iron Boy
- Born: Daniel Amakye Dede; 5 January 1958 (age 68); Agogo, Ashanti Region, Ghana
- Genre: High-life
- Occupations: Singer, songwriter
- Instrument: vocal
- Years active: 1973–present
- Formerly of: Kumapim Royals

Dan Amakye Dede (born 5 January 1958) is a Ghanaian high-life musician. He attended Agogo Roman School. He is best known for classic songs such as: "Jealousy go shame", "Dabi Dabi Ebeye Yie", "Akwadaa Wesoa", and "Iron Boy."

Amakye Dede was installed as a sub-Chief at Agogo in the Asante Akim traditional area.

== Career ==
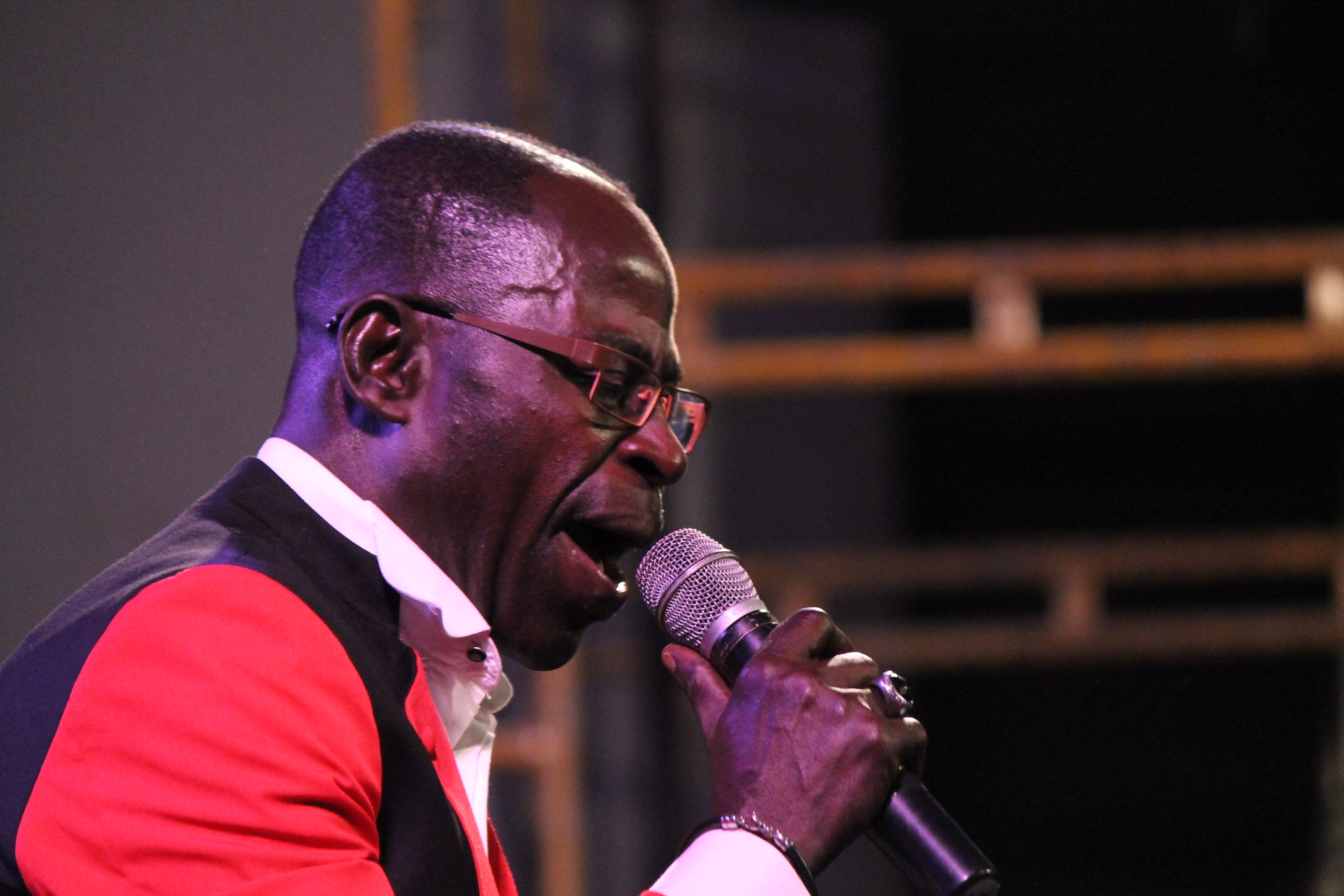
Abrantie Amakye Dede (Iron Boy)

Dede began his career in 1973 when he joined the Kumapim Royals as a composer and a vocalist. This band, led by Akwasi Ampofo Agyei (AAA), had hits such as "Abebi Bewua Eso", "Wanware Me A", "Odo Mani Agyina", and the seminal "Ohohoo Batani". Dede moved to Nigeria, where he had his hit "Jealousy go shame".

He then formed his own band, the Apollo High Kings, in 1980. He dominated the high-life scene in the 1980s and 1990s and has continued to have hit songs in the 21st century. He has headlined so many concerts locally and internationally.

He made almost 20 albums. In his later career, he experimented with different genres: soca, calypso, lovers rock and pop music.

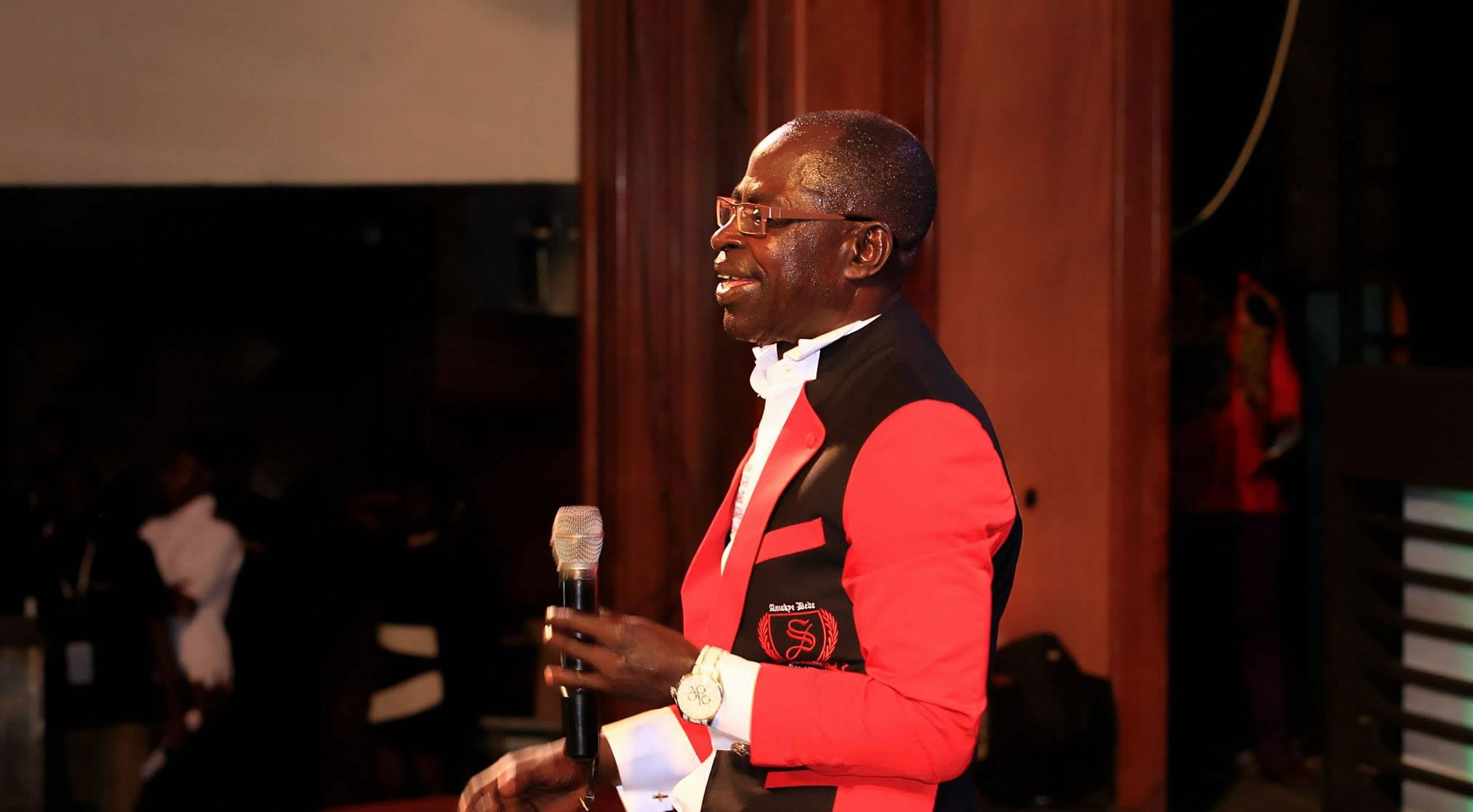

He owns a popular bar in Accra called Abrantee Spot, where he and other high-life musicians regularly play live-band music.

His popular songs include "Handkerchief", "Seniwa", "Bebrebe yi", "Mensuro", "Mabre", "Broken Promises", "Nsuo Amuna", "Sokoo na mmaa pe", "Kose kose", "Dabi dabi", "Mefre wo", "Okyena sesei", "Odo nfonii", "Nka akyi", "M'ani agyina", "To be a man na war", and "Iron Boy".
