= Queen Asabia Cropper =

Ghanaian highlife musician

The Queen of highlife music Queen Asabia Cropper
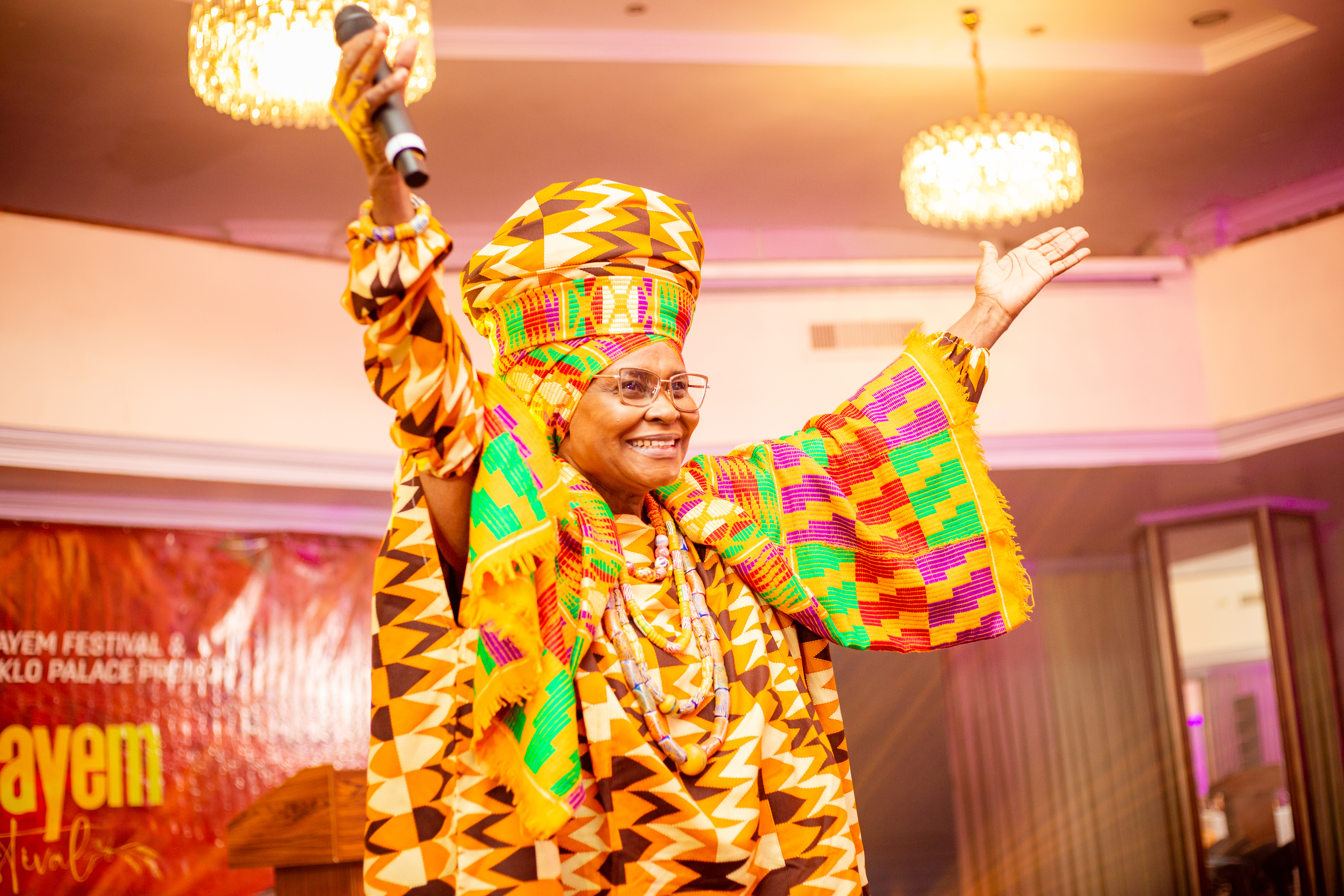

Background information
- Born: Eugenia Asabia Cropper; Accra, Ghana
- Occupation: Singer / saxophonist
- Instrument: Soprano saxophone
- Years active: 1975–present

Eugenia Asabia Cropper popularly known as Queen Asabia Cropper is a Ghanaian female highlife singer and saxophonist. She wears kente cloth headwraps which her grandmother and mother gave her the patterns for in 1975. She created the Mt Kilimanjaro, Afajato kloyo and Yogaga styles.

== Early life and education ==
Queen Asabia Cropper was born, raised and educated in Ghana. She studied fashion design and painting from her mother and coach. Her mother and grandmother gave her the head gear patterns. She is the twin sister of Kenteman, a bassist, multi-instrumentalist and music director. He introduced her to music, teaching her how to play the piano and acoustic guitar in the 1970s.

Queen Asabia Cropper received saxophone instruction from the renowned Ghanaian saxophonist Tex Korley (1978), and from band leader Sammy Lartey Snr of Ghana Broadcasting Corporation (GBC) band 1983.

== Black Hustlers Band ==
The twins played with the Sweet Talks band in Ghana in 1975 and in the Black Hustlers Band in Cote D'ivoire in the 1970s. In 1979, Black Hustlers Band leader – Smart Nkansah and Agyaaku, a vocal singer left the band living Eboni records.

Band members:

- Queen Asabia Cropper (singer / saxophonist)
- Kenteman – bassist
- Pope Flynn (singer / saxophonist)
- Alfred Young (lead guitar)
- Alex Abito (drummer)
- Max Cozy (keyboard)

Wamaya was recorded by Abdoulaye Soumare of Eboni Records headed by director Gerald Theus, Amadou Doukoure and Linda Farmer in Côte D'Ivoire.

The Eboni records band, Black Hustlers backed Mory Kanté's album N'Diarabi with Kenteman on bass guitar.

Queen Asabia Cropper collaborated with Samuel Mangwana and Jimmy Hyacinthe on the album Sam Asabia in 1982.

== Honors and awards ==
In 1984 Queen Asabia Cropper won a gold disc from Daniel Cuxac, the international music executive producer and director of Disco Stock International Cote D'Ivoire. During the Union of Radio and Television networks of Africa (URTNA Awards) in 1993, Queen Asabia Cropper and her brother were honored as cultural ambassadors of Africa. She was also honored as the 'Queen of Highlife Music'.

In 2019, she was honored at the 2019 edition of the Rhythms On Da Runway fashion show by KOD's Nineteen57 for her contribution to fashion in Ghana. She was also honored by MUSIGA Presidential Grand Ball. She received the Music Industry Heroes Award in the second edition of honoring music legends in Ghana. Queen Asabia and her brother Kenteman received a lifetime achievement award from the Musicians Union of Ghana.

Queen Asabia Cropper and Kenteman were honoured when their mentor Agya Koo Nimo played the acoustic guitar on the Wamaya album in 1981. Queen Asabia was the artist of the year and self titled album Asabia was chosen as the album of the year in then Entertainment Critics and Reviewers Association of Ghana (ACRAG) awards 1985.

1983 was the giving birth of kente print in Cote D'Ivoire. A print that was named after Queen Asabia Cropper, Pangne de Asabia which means – Asabia's Cloth or Asabia's trademark uniform. Queen Asabia Cropper and Kenteman have projected and promoted Ghana's kente cloth to the globe for four decades. In the 1980s Queen Asabia Cropper and Kenteman duo had established themselves as Ghana's music ambassadors to the world and their distinctive kente costume nicknamed pangne du Asabia had found many followers globally. Admirers of their kente concepts of togetherness and love of people of all nations of the world include the Empress of African music (Mama Africa) – Miriam Makeba and renowned heads of states and presidents.

In 1984 she was crowned the 'queen of Highlife' at the Ghana National State House.

== Discography ==
- Torwia
- Inamosi
- Wamaya
- I Love So Much
