= Kwame Anyimadu-Antwi =

Ghanaian politician (born 1962)

Hon. Kwame Anyimadu-Antwi
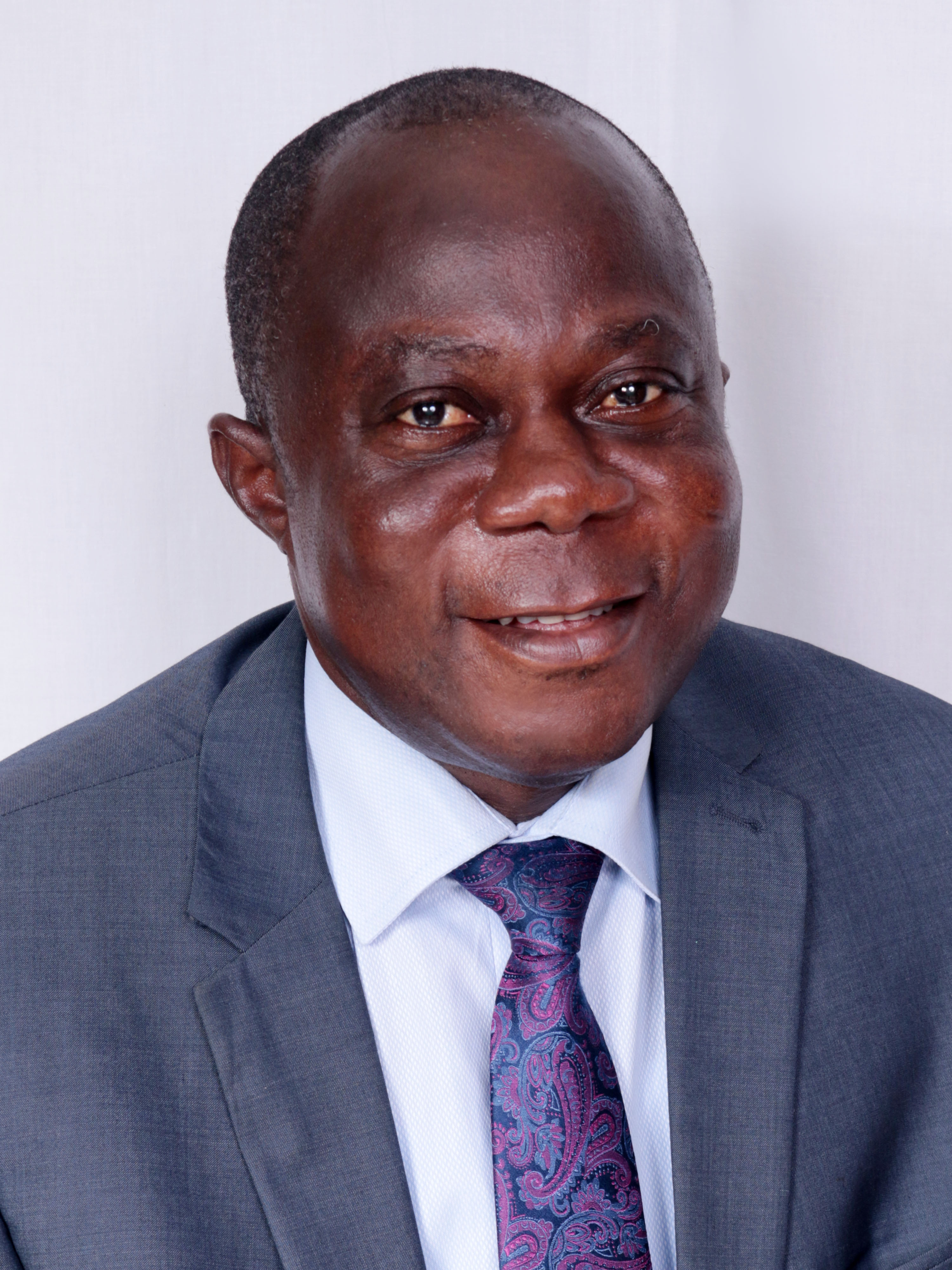

Asante-Akim Central Constituency
- In office 7 January 2013 – 6 January 2017
- Preceded by: New

Asante-Akim North Constituency
- In office 7 January 2009 – 6 January 2013
- Preceded by: Kwadwo Baah-Wiredu
- Succeeded by: Kwadwo Baah Agyemang
- Incumbent
- Assumed office 7 January 2021

Personal details
- Born: April 12, 1962 (age 64) Patriensa
- Party: New Patriotic Party
- Children: 4
- Education: University of London; GIMPA
- Occupation: Lecturer, Lawyer
- Profession: Politician
- Committees: Constitutional, Legal and Parliamentary Affairs Committee; Finance Committee and Standing Orders Committee

Kwame Anyimadu-Antwi (born 12 April 1962) is a Ghanaian lawyer and politician. He is a member of parliament for Asante-Akim Central constituency in the Seventh Parliament and 8th Parliament of the fourth Republic of Ghana in the Ashanti Region, a position he has held since 2009. He represents the New Patriotic Party. Currently, he is a board member of VRA and also the chairperson for the Ghana National Fire Service Council.

== Education ==
Anyimadu-Antwi attended KNUST and had his BSc in Land Economy. He earned a certificate in Project Planning and Management at GIMPA, and an MBA at the University of Ghana, Legon. He qualified as Barrister in Law and was called to the Bar at the Ghana School of Law. He has a masters of law (LLM) degree in Intellectual Property Law from the University of London.

== Early life ==
Anyimadu-Antwi was born on 12 April 1962. He hails from Patriensa in the Ashanti region.

== Career ==
He is an Educationist by profession. He worked at the Land Valuation Division as an assistance valuer from 1989 to 1991. He was then employed as the Estate Officer to assist the manager at the State Insurance Company Of Ghana but now the chief executive officer at real estate (private consultant).

== Politics ==
He is a member of the New Patriotic Party. He served as member of parliament for Asante-Akim North Constituency succeeding the former Minister for Finance and Economic Planning, the late Kwadwo Baah-Wiredu for one term between 2009 and 2013. In 2012, the Asante Akim North was rezoned and divided into two birthing the Asante Akim Central Constituency which fell under the Asante Akim-Central Municipal and the already existing Asante Akim North Constituency. In the 2012 parliamentary elections, he then moved to the Asante Akim Central to stand as a member of parliament which he won.

He stood to be re-elected into the next parliament in the 2016 elections for the Asante Akim Central in the Ashanti region of Ghana. He was voted into office for a third term after defeating his opposition in the 2016 general elections, winning with 75.90% of the total votes cast.

In December 2020, he stood again in the Parliamentary elections and won by getting 22,681 votes representing 52.72% against his closest contender Richard Adu Darko, an independent candidate who got 12,570 votes representing 29.22% of the votes cast to represent in the 8th Parliament of Ghana.

=== Committees ===
He served as chairperson for the Employment, Social Welfare and State Enterprises Committee of the 7th Parliament of the 4th Republic of Ghana. Currently, he is the chairperson for the Constitutional, Legal and Parliamentary Affairs Committee, a member of the Finance Committee and also a member of the Standing Orders Committee.

== Personal life ==
He is married with four children. He is a Christian and a member of the Presbyterian church. He is also a member of the Ghana Bar Association.

In 2017, his daughter committed suicide by hanging herself at KNUST.
