= The Villain I Never Was =

Studio album by Black Sherif
- Released: 6 October 2022
- Recorded: 2021–2022
- Genre: Hip-hop, reggae, Afrobeats
- Length: 40:48
- Label: Blacko Management; Empire

Black Sherif chronology
The Villain I Never Was (2022)	Take Care of Yourself Blacko (2023)

Singles from The Villain I Never Was
- 1. "Second Sermon (Remix)" Released: 7 December 2021; 2. "Kwaku the Traveller" Released: 30 March 2022; 3. "Soja" Released: 22 September 2022; 4. "45" Released: 14 October 2022; 5. "Konongo Zongo" Released: 23 December 2022

Professional ratings
Review scores
Source	Rating
AfroCritik	7/10
Pulse Nigeria	7.9/10

The Villain I Never Was is the debut album by Ghanaian singer Black Sherif, released on 6 October 2022 through Blacko Management and Empire. The album contains 14 songs, and was supported by five singles, "Soja", "Kwaku the Traveller", a remix of "Second Sermon" which features Nigerian artist Burna Boy, "45", and "Konongo Zongo"

== Background ==
The album was released in October 2022. A reviewer for Pulse Nigeria said Black Sherif's songs are like short stories, and "he employs a dark, honest and philosophical approach to his storytelling".

== Commercial performance ==
The album debuted at number 12 on the Billboard World Albums Chart.

== Track listing ==
All tracks are written by Black Sherif, except where noted.

The Villain I Never Was track listing
No.	Title	Writer(s)	Length
1.	"The Homeless Song"		2:44
2.	"Oil in My Head"		2:29
3.	"45"		2:52
4.	"Soja"		3:01
5.	"Prey da Youngsta"		3:01
6.	"Sad Boys Don't Fold"		2:40
7.	"Konongo Zongo"		2:41
8.	"Wasteman"		2:31
9.	"We Up"		2:27
10.	"Toxic Love City"		3:12
11.	"Don't Forget Me"		3:37
12.	"Oh Paradise"		3:07
13.	"Kwaku the Traveller"		3:05
14.	"Second Sermon" (Remix featuring Burna Boy)	Black Sherif; Burna Boy	3:14
Total length:			40:48

== Charts ==
Chart performance for The Villain I Never Was
Chart (2022)	Peak position
Nigeria Albums (TurnTable)	8
