= Discrimination in Ghana =

Social issue in Ghana

Discrimination in Ghana refers to all forms and manifestations of actions that deny social participation or human rights to certain categories of people in Ghanaian society or institutions.

Though not always the case, discrimination in Ghana is often based on preconceived, usually unfavorable, judgments toward people or a person because of their religion, tribe, language or personal characteristics including but not limited to gender, political opinion, social class, age, disability and sexual orientation.

In 2013, Ghana placed below average on the Fragile States Index scoring 4.9/10.0 when measured against the variables of Tolerance and Inclusion, and Discrimination and violence against minorities.

== Types of discrimination in Ghana ==
=== Disability ===
Discrimination in Ghana is widespread against the disabled. Few educational institutions accept disabled students or make provision for such students including those with mild cases, for example students who cannot climb stairs. Government building and worship centers are mostly built also lacking that same capability. Adults with mental illness may be put in prayer camps. In some communities infants who show signs of deformity are put to death for fear of infecting everyone else in their family with a perceived bad luck.

=== Education institutions ===
The Lord's Prayer is compulsory to students in all basic schools and in most senior high schools in the country. Besides the Lord's Prayer, Morning devotion, the widely practiced Christian ritual of praying before class starts in the morning is now been contested by Muslim parents and students.

=== Employment and workplace ===
Muslim women are banned from wearing a headscarf to work not only in private spaces but also in government offices. In March 2015, nurses at Mamobi Polyclinic in Accra were asked to go home and not return as punishment for putting on some form of head covering.

=== Religion ===
Chapter 5 of the Constitution of Ghana protects freedom and practice of religion. 2013 Report on International Religious Freedom published by the United States Department of State concludes that Government of Ghana generally respects all religious groups and has shown commitment to this by demonstrating leadership style when skirmishes do arise. It however confirmed among other cases accounts of instructors at some public schools openly discriminating against students based on their Islamic faith. Following statements made by Bishop Charles Agyin-Asare at a Sunrise service in 2015 that there was "a religious cleansing campaign aimed at exterminating all Christians from the face of the earth and that "the world's 1.2 billion Muslim population were targeting Christians to harm them for being Christians", various calls have been made by the government and stakeholders for religious leaders to moderate their speech and avoid cultivating fertile ground that can yield tension between the two faiths in Ghana. Agyen Asare at the service stated that "We won't keep quiet anymore, some people believe that they should kill others so that they are the only people who can worship their 'whoever'". He further stated that "It's unfortunate; and we are going to do something about it". The Chief Imam has consistently dismissed claims of an existing Muslim-Christian tensions in the country stating that "we are living in harmony and would continue to do so". In a 2015 press release, he reiterated the need for Muslims and Christians to engage in dialogue to resolve problems.

== See also ==
- Discrimination
