= Patriensa =

Town in Ghana

Coordinates: 6°39′N 1°11′W

Patriensa is a town in the Asante Akim central municipality of the Ashanti region of south-central Ghana. There are about 7,000 residents, two-quarters of which make their living from farming. There are 25 other villages in the district.
