= Kumasi Technical University =

Public tertiary institution in Ghana

- Type: University
- Established: 1954; 72 years ago
- Location: Kumasi, Ashanti Region, Ghana; 6°41′28″N 1°36′36″W
- Website: kstu.edu.gh

The Kumasi Technical University, formerly known as Kumasi Polytechnic, is a public tertiary institution in the Ashanti Region of Ghana.

Kumasi Technical University is one of the Polytechnics in Ghana diverted into University. It is located at the heart of Kumasi, the capital city of the Ashanti Region of Ghana. The Vice of the Kumasi Technical University is Professor Nana Osei-Wusu Achiaw. He is the first VC since it was diverted into a University

== History ==
The university, known earlier as Kumasi Technical Institute, was established in 1954, but started actual teaching and learning in 1955, dealing mainly with craft courses. It became a polytechnic on 30 October 1963 and a university in 2017. From then on, it concentrated on Technician and a few Diploma Programmes. Additionally, a few professional courses were offered. Following the enactment of the Polytechnic Law 1992, PNDC Law 321, Kumasi Polytechnic ceased to exist in its previous form and became a tertiary institution.

== Faculties ==
It has expanded from three faculties and one centre in 2009/2010 to six faculties, one school and two institutes in the 2010/2011 academic year. The polytechnic is currently organised into the following faculties, Schools and Institutes:

1. Faculty of Engineering
2. Faculty of Built and Natural Environment
3. Faculty of Medicine and Health Sciences
4. Faculty of Applied Sciences
5. Faculty of Creative Arts and Technology
6. School of Business
7. Institute of Entrepreneurship and Enterprise Development
8. Institute of Distance and Continuing Education
9. School of Graduate Studies, Research and Innovation

== Departments ==
=== School of Business ===
- Accountancy and Accounting Information Systems Department
- Liberal Studies Department
- Management Studies Department
- Marketing Department
- Procurement and Supply Chain Management Department

=== Faculty of Built and Natural Environment ===
- Building Technology Department
- Estate Management Department
- Interior Architecture and Furniture Production Department

=== Faculty of Engineering ===
- Chemical Engineering Department
- Civil Engineering Department
- Electrical/Electronic Engineering Department
- Mechanical Engineering Department

=== Faculty of Applied Sciences ===
- Computer Science Department
- Hotel, Catering and Institutional Management Department
- Mathematics and Statistics Department

=== Faculty of Creative Arts and Technology ===
- Fashion Design and Textiles Department
- Graphic Design Department

=== Faculty of Medicine and Health Sciences ===
- Laboratory Technology Department
- Pharmaceutical Sciences Department

=== Institute of Entrepreneurship and Enterprise Development ===
- Agropreneurship
- Centre for Entrepreneurship Research in Africa
- Consultancy and Business Incubation Centre
- Entrepreneurship and Finance

== Programmes offered ==
=== Faculty of Business and Management Studies ===
- Bachelor of Technology in Accounting with Computing
- Bachelor of Technology in Procurement Management
- BSC. FINANCIAL ACCOUNTING (SPECIAL PROGRAMME)
- BSC. MARKETING (SPECIAL PROGRAMME)
- BSC. PROCUREMENT (SPECIAL PROGRAMME)
- Certificate in Accounting
- Diploma in Banking Technology and Accounting (DBTA)
- Diploma in Business Administration (DBA)
- Diploma in Business Studies (Accountancy, Entrepreneurship, Secretarial, Statistics, Management, Marketing and Purchasing and Supply options)
- Diploma in Computerised Accounting (DCA)
- Diploma in Electronic Marketing
- Diploma in Procurement & Materials Management
- Diploma in Public Relations
- HND Accountancy (Regular/Evening/Weekend Options)
- HND Accounting with Computing (Regular/Evening/Weekend Options)
- HND Marketing (Regular/Evening/Weekend Options)
- HND Purchasing and Supply (Regular/Evening/Weekend Options)
- HND Secretaryship and Management Studies (Regular/ Evening/Weekend Options)
- Post Graduate Certificate in Computerized Accounting (PGCCA)
- Professional Diploma in Banking Technology and Accounting (PDBTA)
- Professional Diploma in Computerised Accounting (PDCA)

=== Faculty of Built and Natural Environment ===
- Interior Architecture & Furniture Production (Access Course)
- Advanced Furniture Craft
- Bachelor of Technology in Building Technology
- Bachelor of Technology in Estate Management
- BSC. ESTATE MANAGEMENT (SPECIAL PROGRAMME)
- Building Technology (Access Course)
- Construction Technicians Course I
- Construction Technicians Course II
- Construction Technicians Course Part III.
- HND Building Technology (Regular Only)
- HND Estate Management (Regular Only)
- HND Interior Architecture and Furniture Production (Regular Only)
- Interior Architecture and Furniture Production (Access Course)

=== Faculty of Engineering ===
- Bachelor of Technology in Chemical Engineering
- Bachelor of Technology in Chemical Engineering - Top Up
- Bachelor of Technology in Civil Engineering
- Bachelor of Technology in Civil Engineering - Top Up
- Bachelor of Technology in Mechanical Engineering
- Bachelor of Technology in Mechanical Engineering - Top Up
- BSC. OIL AND GAS ENGINEERING (SPECIAL PROGRAMME)
- BSC. PETRO-CHEMICAL ENGINEERING (SPECIAL PROGRAMME)
- Chemical Engineering (Access Course)
- Civil Engineering (Access Course)
- Electrical Engineering Technician Part I
- Electrical Engineering Technician Part II
- Electrical Engineering Technicians Part III
- Electrical/Electronic Engineering(Access Course)
- HND Chemical Engineering (Regular Only)
- HND Civil Engineering (Regular Only)
- HND Electrical/Electronic Engineering (Regular Only)
- HND Mechanical Engineering with choice of options at Level 200 Options: (I) Plant (II) Production (III) Automotive and (IV) Metallurgy (Regular Only)
- Mechanical Engineering (Access Course)
- Mechanical Engineering Technicians Part I
- Mechanical Engineering Technicians Part II
- Mechanical Engineering Technicians Part III
- Motor Vehicle Technicians Part I
- Motor Vehicle Technicians Part II
- Motor Vehicle Technicians Part III

=== Faculty of Applied Sciences ===
- BSC. COMPUTER SCIENCE (SPECIAL PROGRAMME)
- Catering 812/1
- Catering 812/2
- Diploma in Hardware and Networking
- Diploma in Information Technology
- Diploma in Web Applications and Database
- HND Computer Science (Regular Only)
- HND Hotel, Catering and Institutional Management (Regular Only)
- HND Statistics (Regular Only)
- Hotel, Catering and Institutional Management (Access Course)

=== Faculty of Creative Arts and Technology ===
- Access Course
- Advanced Fashion Design
- HND Fashion Design and Textiles Studies (Regular Only)
- Intermediate Fashion

=== Faculty of Medicine and Health Sciences ===
- BSC. PHARMACEUTICAL SCIENCE (SPECIAL PROGRAMME)
- HND Dispensing Technology (Regular Only)
- HND Medical Laboratory
- HND Science Laboratory
- ONE YEAR TOP-UP HND DISPENSING TECHNOLOGY PROGRAMME

== Facilities ==
It has also established an ICT Directorate headed by a Director and an office for International Affairs and Institutional Linkages also headed by a Director.

The School comprises 27 Departments offering Full – time and Part – time programmes at Tertiary and Non – Tertiary Levels. The Polytechnic offers unique programmes such as Estate Management and Dispensing Technology and these disciplines attract students from Uganda, Sierra Leone, Nigeria, the West African sub regions.

The institution is presently running degree programmes in addition to its Higher National Diploma (HND) programmes.

== Vision and mission ==
=== Vision ===
To be a Centre of Excellence for tertiary level training of technical and professional human resource with entrepreneurial skills.

=== Mission ===
To provide a favourable environment for teaching, research, skills and entrepreneurship training in science, technology, applied social sciences and applied arts for industrial and community development. This is to attract students and scholars from local and international communities and also to provide consultancy services.

== See also ==
- List of universities in Ghana
- Education in Ghana
