= Andy Appiah-Kubi =

Ghanaian politician (born 1957)

Hon. Andy Kwame Appiah-Kubi
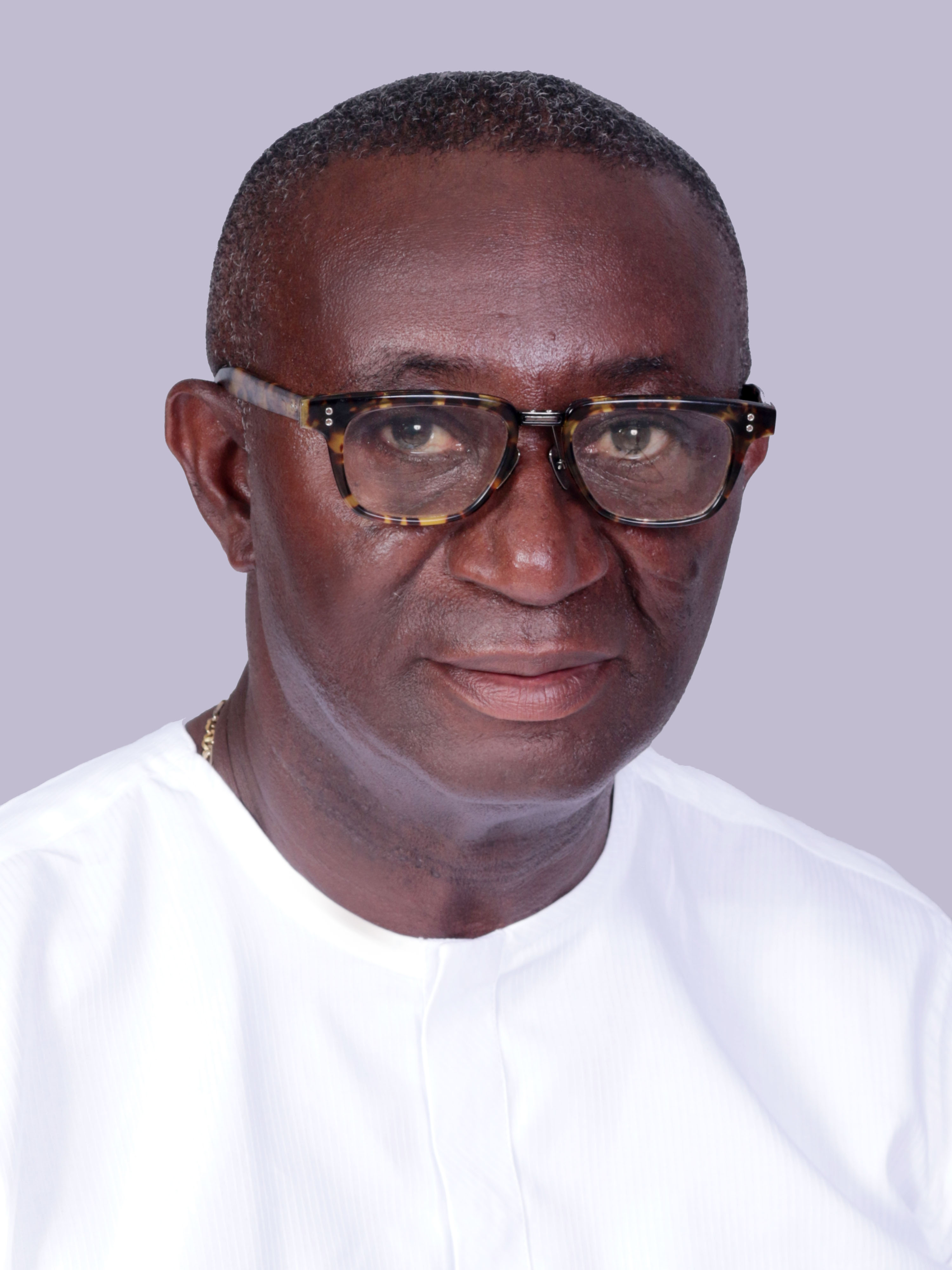

Member of the Ghana Parliament for Asante-Akim North Constituency
- In office 7 January 2017 – 6 January 2021
- Preceded by: Kwadwo Baah Agyemang
- Succeeded by: Ohene Kwame Frimpong
- In office 7 January 2021 – 6 January 2025

Personal details
- Born: 7 July 1957 (age 69) Asante Akyem Juansa
- Party: New Patriotic Party
- Education: Konongo Odumasi Senior High School.
- Occupation: Legal Solicitor (lawyer)
- Profession: Lawyer
- Committees: Members Holding Offices of Profit Committee; Foreign Affairs Committee

Andy Kwame Appiah-Kubi (7 July 1957) is a Ghanaian politician and member of the Seventh Parliament and 8th Parliament of the Fourth Republic of Ghana, representing the Asante-Akim North Constituency in the Ashanti Region on the ticket of the New Patriotic Party.

== Education ==
Appiah-Kubi holds BA (Hons), MBA and LLB from the University of Ghana, Legon. He holds a professional certificate in Law from the Ghana school of Law.

== Career ==
In 1989, Appiah-Kubi was the chief executive officer for Ideal Veterinary Supply until 1994. He assumed a new position as the country Director for AFEX International group until 2001 when he left to assume a new role as the Deputy Executive Secretary for the Free Zones Board, a position he held till 2009. He assumes a new role as the Chief Executive Office of Appiah-Kubi and Associates.

== Politics ==
Appiah-Kubi stood on the ticket of the New Patriotic Party and won the 2016 Parliamentary Election to represent the people of Asante-Akim North Constituency in the Seventh Parliament of the Fourth Republic of Ghana. He was then appointed as the Deputy Minister for Railways Development by the President, Nana Addo Dankwah Akufo-Addo.

He was re-elected in the 2020 general election to represent his constituents in the 8th Parliament of the Fourth Republic of Ghana. He polled 25,009 representing 63.91% of the valid vote cast whiles the NDC parliamentary candidate Alhaji Adams Sulley Yussif had 14,123 votes representing 36.1% of the total valid votes cast.

=== Committees ===
Appiah-Kubi is a member of the Members Holding Offices of Profit Committee and also a member of the Foreign Affairs Committee.

== Personal life ==
Appiah-Kubi is a Christian.

== Controversy ==
In September 2020, Appiah-Kubi was charged for Contempt after he was alleged to have declared himself as the selected NPP parliamentary candidate despite a court ruling. He allegedly branded vehicles and also put up billboards claiming he was selected for the political party.
