= Kwadwo Baah Agyemang =

Ghanaian politician (born 1975)

Kwadwo Baah Agyeman

Member of the Ghana Parliament for Asante Akim North Constituency
- In office 7 January 2013 – 6 January 2017
- Preceded by: Kwame Anyimadu-Antwi
- Succeeded by: Andy Kwame Appiah-Kubi

Personal details
- Born: 24 January 1975 (age 51)
- Party: New Patriotic Party
- Education: University of Ghana

Kwadwo Baah Agyemang (born 24 January 1975) is a Ghanaian politician and member of the Sixth Parliament of the Fourth Republic of Ghana representing the Asante Akim North Constituency in the Ashanti Region on the ticket of the New Patriotic Party.

== Early life and education ==
Agyemang was born on 24 January 1975. He hails from Agogo, a town in the Ashanti Region of Ghana. He attended the Regent University of Science and Technology in Accra and obtained his Bachelor of Science degree in marketing in 2012. He also attended the University of Ghana and obtained his diploma in Public Administration in 2007. He holds another certificate from UNITAR, Switzerland in International debt players from United Nations. He holds a certification from the Chartered Institute of Marketing in the United Kingdom and has obtained a diploma in Advertising and Marketing. Kwadwo has an Executive Masters in Public administration from Ghana Institute of Management and Public Administration (GIMPA)

== Politics ==
Agyemang is a member of the New Patriotic Party (NPP). In 2012, he contested for the Asante Akim North seat on the ticket of the NPP sixth parliament of the fourth republic and won with 14,966 votes, which represented 43.64% of the total votes cast. In 2016, he did not contest in the 2016 Ghanaian elections. Instead, Andy Kwame Appiah-Kubi who was elected by the New Patriotic Party members represented the party in the elections.

Presently, Kwadwo is the Governing Board Chairman of National sports Authority.

== Personal life ==
Agyemang identifies as a Christian who fellowships at the Resurrection Power Living Bread Christian Center. He is married.
