= Asante-Akim North (Ghana parliament constituency) =

Constituency in the Ashanti Region of Ghana

- constituency for the Parliament of Ghana
- District: Asante Akim North District
- Region: Ashanti Region of Ghana

Current constituency
- Party: Independent
- MP: Ohene Kwame Frimpong

Asante-Akim North is one of the constituencies represented in the Parliament of Ghana. It elects one Member of Parliament (MP) by the first past the post system of election. Ohene Kwame Frimpong is the member of parliament for the constituency. Asante-Akim North is located in the Asante Akim North district of the Ashanti Region of Ghana.

== Boundaries ==
The seat is located within the Asante Akim North District of the Ashanti Region of Ghana.

== Members of Parliament ==
Election	Member	Party
1992	Collins Agyarko Nti	National Democratic Congress
1996	Kwadwo Baah-Wiredu	New Patriotic Party
2000	Kwadwo Baah-Wiredu	New Patriotic Party
2004	Kwadwo Baah-Wiredu	New Patriotic Party
2008	Kwame Anyimadu Antwi	New Patriotic Party
2012	Kwadwo Baah Agyemang	New Patriotic Party
2016	Andy Kwame Appiah-Kubi	New Patriotic Party
2020		
2024	Kwame Frimpong	Independent

== Elections ==
2008 Ghanaian parliamentary election: Asante-Akim North Source: Ghana Home Page
Party	Candidate	Votes	%	±%
New Patriotic Party	Kwame Anyimadu Antwi	36,809	67.7	
National Democratic Congress	Thomas Osei Bonsu	9,804	18.0	
Independent	Alexander Osei Tutu	7,180	13.2	
RPD	Francis Kyei	232	0.4	
People's National Convention	Isaac Atobra	219	0.4	
Convention People's Party	Kwabena Anarfi	163	0.3	
Majority		27,005	49.7	

== See also ==
- List of Ghana Parliament constituencies
