= Tagoe Sisters =

Ghanaian musical twin duo

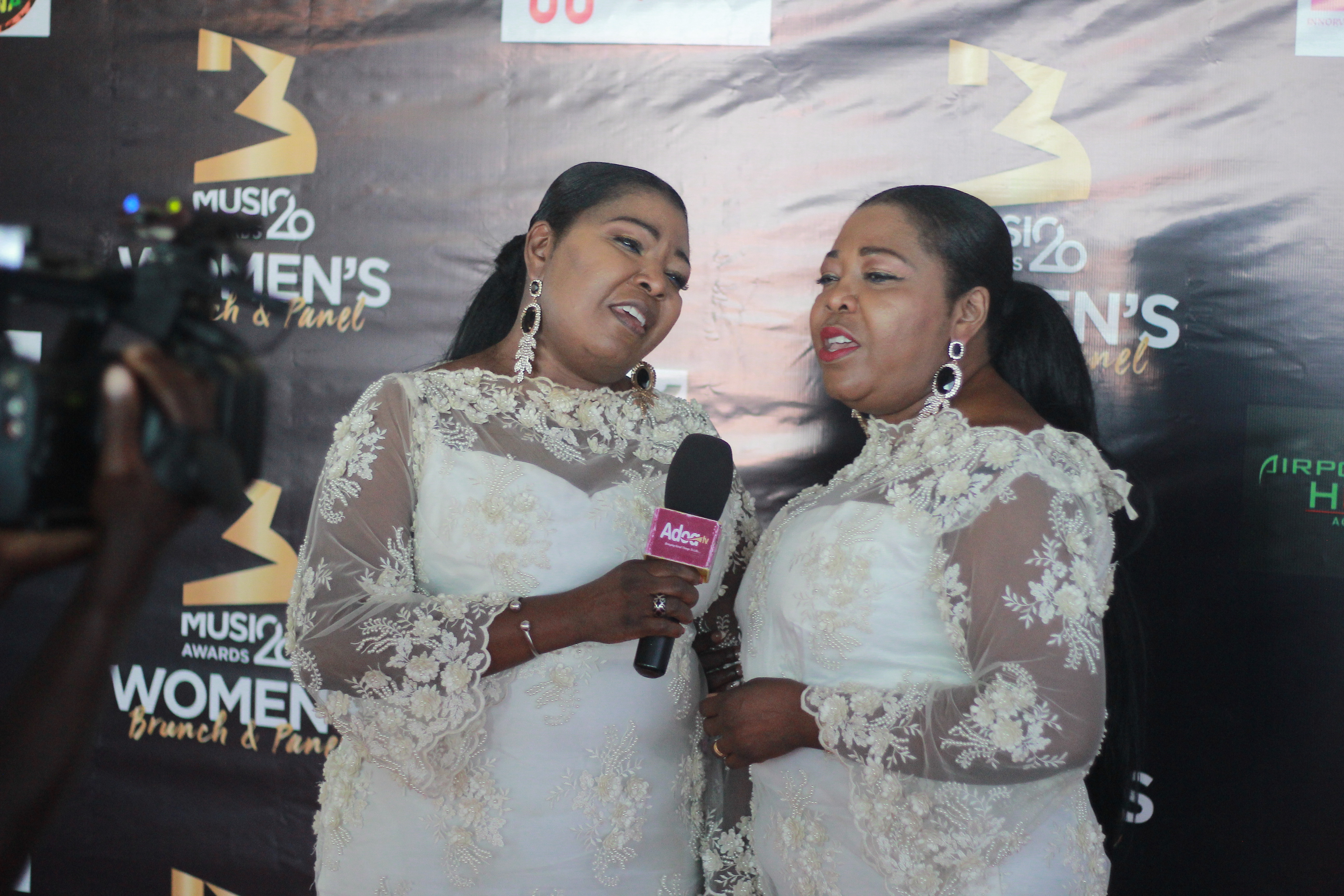

Background information
- Born: Lydia Dedei Yawson Nee Tagoe and Elizabeth Korkoi Tagoe; 27 July 1965 (age 60)
- Origin: Ghanaian
- Genres: gospel music
- Occupations: Recording artist, performer
- Instrument: Vocals
- Years active: 1983–present
- Label: OX Records

Tagoe Sisters is the name of a musical duo consisting of twins Lydia Dedei Yawson Nee Tagoe and Elizabeth Korkoi Tagoe. They have been singing in the gospel music industry since 1983. In March 2021, the group was honored by the organizers of 3Music Awards in an event called the 3Music Women's Brunch.

== Early life ==
Lydia Dedei Yawson (née Tagoe) and Elizabeth Korkoi Tagoe, who are twins, were born to the late Hammond Ayikwei Tagoe and Madam Theresa Aidoo on 27 July 1965. Their father, Hammond Ayikwei Tagoe, was from Korle-Wokon, a suburb of Accra and their mother, Theresa Aidoo, was from Dunkwa-on-Offin in the Central Region. They had their education at the Alogboshie primary and middle school, near Achimota in Accra. Later, they went to the YMCA to learn dressmaking, which they abandoned to venture into singing.

== Career ==
In the early days of their career, the duo worked in a group of three, with Hannah Tsia Mensah, called the "I am Three Sisters". They sang backup for musicians like Felix Bell and G Man and made appearances on Mr Picus Laryea's shows in the 1970s. In 1983, they joined the Open Bible Church International where they met the male singing group, the Advent Heralds. They backed the Heralds at their public performances. In 1985 they met the late Rev. Francis Akwasi Amoako who became their mentor. Under his guidance, they toured far and wide both in and out of Ghana and gained fame. Their first album 'Nyame ye Kese' which was written by the Advent Heralds, was released in 1987. Orekyekye and Stay in my Heart followed in 1988. In 1990, they lost their mentor in a fatal accident as they were returning to Accra after performing at a crusade in Takoradi. Rev. Dr Thomas Harry Yawson came into their lives and became their songwriter and director.

== Personal lives ==
Rev Thomas Yawson married Lydia and they have three children. Elizabeth also has two children with her late husband. Lydia is a caterer and Elizabeth is an event planner. They established the Tagoe Twin Foundation to support mothers who use their twin children to beg for alms. They also have the Tagoe Sisters Association which was created with the vision to be an enabler for twins' mothers to support each other.

== Awards and nominations ==
Year	Organisation	Award	Work	Result
1990	Entertainment Critics & Reviewers Association of Ghana (ECRAG)	Best Gospel Album	Stay in Heart	Won
1994	Entertainment Critics & Reviewers Association of Ghana (ECRAG)	Best Gospel Album	Manya Yesu	Won
1990	National Christian Awards Committee	Most Consistent Gospel Group		Won
1996	Ebony	Best Gospel Artistes		Won
1997	Ghana Music Awards	Best Female Artistes		Won
1997	Ghana Music Awards	Best Gospel Album	Anka Matete	Won
1997	Konkoma Awards	Best Female Artistes		Won
1997	Konkoma Awards	Best Gospel Album	Anka Matete	Won
1998	Friends World Awards	Female Music Group of the Year		Won
1998	Friends World Awards	Music Video of the Year	Anka Matete	Won
1998	Friends World Awards	Female Performer of the Year		Won
