= Konongo, Ghana =

Konongo Konongo-Odumase
- Town & Municipality Capital
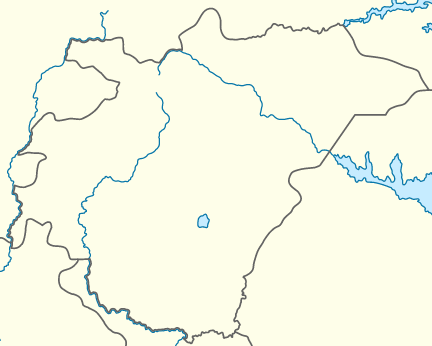
- Location of Konongo within Ashanti
- Coordinates: 06°37′00″N 01°13′00″W
- Country: Ghana
- Region: Ashanti
- Municipality: Asante Akim Central District

Population (2012)
  - Total: 71,238
  - Ethnicity: Ashanti people
  - Demonym: Konongoan
- Time zone: Greenwich Mean Time
  - Summer (DST): GMT

Konongo (also Konongo-Odumase) is a gold bar miningcommunity located in Ashanti, Ghana. The town serves as the capital of the Asante Akim Central Municipal. As of 2012, Konongo has a settlement population of 41,238 people. Konongo is about 53 kilometres (33 mi) from Kumasi, the Ashanti capital.

== Toponymy ==
The name of Konongo is derived from rural folklore of drinking palm oil (kor-nom-ngo).

== Gold Mining and Manganese Mining ==
The Gold mining town of Konongo has always been a lively town. It was a very boisterous town many decades before the 1950s. Konongo was the commercial capital of the Kumasi East Council which later became the Asante-Akyem District. The Gold mines that was owned by British companies attracted many nationalities from the West African Sub-Region as well as other ethnic groups from the West African Sub-Region.

Konongo Gold Mine is a suspended open pit mine in Ashanti and the Konongo Gold Mine mainly produces bullion gold bars. In Raw Materials Data production data for gold for 6 years, between 1984 and 1992 can be found and the Konongo Gold Mine is controlled/owned by Signature Metals Ltd, Konongo Gold Mine is just one of 26,000 entities to be found in Raw Materials Data, the mining industry's most extensive database. Konongo has manganese ores deposits estimated at over 1.7 million metric tonnes at Odumase near Konongo in Ashanti as the Ashanti manganese ores deposits have manganese content of 19.7%.

== Education ==
Konogo-Odumase is the location of the Konongo-Odumase Senior High School, a coeducational second cycle institution. It was officially opened on 23 February 1953

In December 2017, over 100 students of the Konongo-Odumase Senior High School (SHS) were displaced after a huge fire engulfed the school's boys' dormitory on Saturday night.

== Notable people ==
Professional footballer Sulley Muntari, Mohammed Rabiu, Black Sherif were born and raised in the town, as was percussionist Rebop Kwaku Baah.

A prominent lawyer from Konongo is Kwame Anyimadu-Antwi, member of Parliament of Asante Akyem Central Constituency.

== See also ==
- Geology of Ghana
- Birimian
