= Kwadwo Baah-Wiredu =

Ghanaian politician (1952–2008)

Hon. Kwadwo Baah-Wiredu

Member of Parliament for Asante Akim North
- In office 7 January 1997 – 24 September 2008
- Preceded by: Collins Agyarko Nti
- Succeeded by: Kwame Anyimadu-Antwi

Minister for Finance and Economic Planning
- In office 2005 – 24 September 2008
- President: John Kufuor
- Preceded by: Yaw Osafo-Marfo
- Succeeded by: Dr. Anthony Akoto Osei

Minister for Education, Youth and Sports
- In office 2003–2005
- President: John Kufuor
- Preceded by: Christopher Ameyaw-Akumfi
- Succeeded by: Yaw Osafo-Marfo

Minister for Local Government and Rural Development
- In office 2001–2003
- President: John Kufuor
- Preceded by: Cecilia Johnson
- Succeeded by: Kwadwo Adjei-Darko

Personal details
- Born: 1952 Asante Akim Agogo, Ghana
- Died: 24 September 2008 (aged 55–56) Pretoria, South Africa
- Party: New Patriotic Party
- Children: 6
- Education: University of Ghana
- Profession: Chartered Accountant

Kwadwo Baah-Wiredu (1952 – 24 September 2008) was a Ghanaian politician and a chartered accountant. He was Member of Parliament for Asante Akim North Constituency from January 1997 until his death on 24 September 2008. He served as a Minister of state at different ministries under the Kufuor government from 2001.

== Early life and education ==
Baah-Wiredu was born in Asante Akim Agogo. He started his secondary education at the Kumasi High School in 1967. He obtained the GCE Ordinary Level Certificate in 1972. He had his sixth form education at Prempeh College, also in Kumasi. Baah-Wiredu proceeded to the University of Ghana in 1974 and obtained a B.Sc. in Administration (Accounting option). He then did a four-year course with the Institute of Chartered Accountants qualifying as a chartered accountant in 1985.

== Career ==
Kwadwo Baah-Wiredu worked within various positions with Ghana Airways and Volta River Authority. He worked as a senior consultant on computer-systems and as finance manager of Ananse Systems. Prior to becoming a member of Parliament, he was a partner in Asante Wiredu and Associates, an accounting firm.

== Politics ==
=== Member of Parliament ===
Baah-Wiredu began his political career in 1997 as Member of Parliament for Asante Akim following his victory at the 1996 Ghanaian General Election. He was one of the campaigners against the Union government (UNIGOV) concept promoted by General Acheampong's Supreme Military Council in 1978. He joined the New Patriotic Party when it was formed in 1992. He became an MP in the Second Parliament of the Fourth Republic after the 1996 parliamentary elections and since retained his seat.

=== Minister of state ===
He became a Minister in John Kufuor's NPP government in 2001. He held the portfolios of Local Government and Rural Development (2001–2003) and Education, Youth and Sports (2003–2005).He became the Minister for Finance and Economic Planning in 2005. In 2005, he was the first Finance Minister in Ghana's history to present the country's Budget Statement and Economic Policy to Parliament before the arrival of that fiscal year with his budget for the fiscal year 2006. Since then, this has become a norm for all successive Finance Ministers.

== Elections ==
In the year 2000, Baah-Wiredu won the general elections as the member of parliament for the Asante Akim North constituency of the Ashanti Region of Ghana. He won on the ticket of the New Patriotic Party. His constituency was a part of the 31 parliamentary seats out of 33 seats won by the New Patriotic Party in that election for the Ashanti Region. The New Patriotic Party won a majority total of 99 parliamentary seats out of 200 seats. He was elected with 32,341 votes out of 45,227 total valid votes cast. This was equivalent to 72.3% of the total valid votes cast. He was elected over Kofi Opoku Manu of the National Democratic Congress, Kwabena Anafi of the Convention People's Party, James K. Baah of the People's National Convention, Emmanuel K. Adade of the New Reformed Party and Joseph B Frimpong of the United Ghana Movement. These candidates won 11,852, 168, 151, 130 and 75 votes out of the total valid votes cast respectively. These were equivalent to 26.5%, 0.4%, 0.3%, 0.3% and 0.2% respectively of total valid votes cast.

Baah-Wiredu was elected as the member of parliament for the Asante Akim North constituency of the Ashanti Region of Ghana in the 2004 Ghanaian general elections. He won on the ticket of the New Patriotic Party. His constituency was a part of the 36 parliamentary seats out of 39 seats won by the New Patriotic Party in that election for the Ashanti Region. The New Patriotic Party won a majority total of 128 parliamentary seats out of 230 seats. He was elected with 40,497 votes out of 53,098 total valid votes cast equivalent to 76.3% of total valid votes cast. He was elected over Atobrah Isaac of the Peoples' National Convention, Thomas Osei Bonsu Nkansah of the National Democratic Congress and Kwabena Anarfi of the Convention People's Party. These candidates obtained 0.8%, 21.6% and 1.3% respectively of total valid votes cast.

== Personal life ==
Baah-Wiredu was married with 6 children.

== Death ==
On 24 September 2008, Baah-Wiredu died in South Africa where he had been receiving medical treatment for a short illness.

Parliament of Ghana
Preceded by ?	Member of Parliament for Asante Akin North; 1997–2008	Succeeded by Kwame Anyimadu Antwi
Political offices
Preceded by Cecilia Johnson	Minister for Local Government and Rural Development; 2001–2003	Succeeded by Kwadwo Adjei-Darko
Preceded by Christopher Ameyaw-Akumfi	Minister for Education, Youth and Sports; 2003–2005	Succeeded by Yaw Osafo-Marfo
Preceded by Yaw Osafo-Marfo	Minister for Finance and Economic Planning; 2005–2008	Succeeded by Anthony Akoto Osei
