= Asante Akim Central Municipal District =

- Municipal District
- Districts of Ashanti Region

- Location of Asante Akim Central Municipal District within Ashanti
- Coordinates: 6°37′5″N 1°12′36″W
- Country: Ghana
- Region: Ashanti
- Capital: Konongo-Odumase

Government
  - District Executive: George Frimpong

Area
  - Total: 1,462 km^{2} (564 sq mi)

Population (2021)
  - Total: 91,673
  - Density: 62.70/km^{2} (162.4/sq mi)
- Time zone: UTC+0 (Greenwich Mean Time)
  - Summer (DST): GMT

Asante Akim Central Municipal District is one of the forty-three districts in Ashanti Region, Ghana. Originally created as an ordinary district assembly in 1988 as the 1st Asante Akim North District, which it was created from the former Asante Akim District Council. Later it was elevated to municipal district assembly status to become Asante Akim North Municipal District in November 2007 (effective 29 February 2008). However, in July 2012, the northern part of the district was split off to create a new Asante Akim North District; thus the remaining part has been renamed to become Asante Akim Central Municipal District. The municipality is located in the eastern part of Ashanti Region and has Konongo as its capital town.

== Governance ==
The member of parliament for the municipal is Kwame Anyimadu-Antwi and Susan Akomea is the Municipal Chief Executive.
