= Efya =

Ghanaian singer (born 1987)

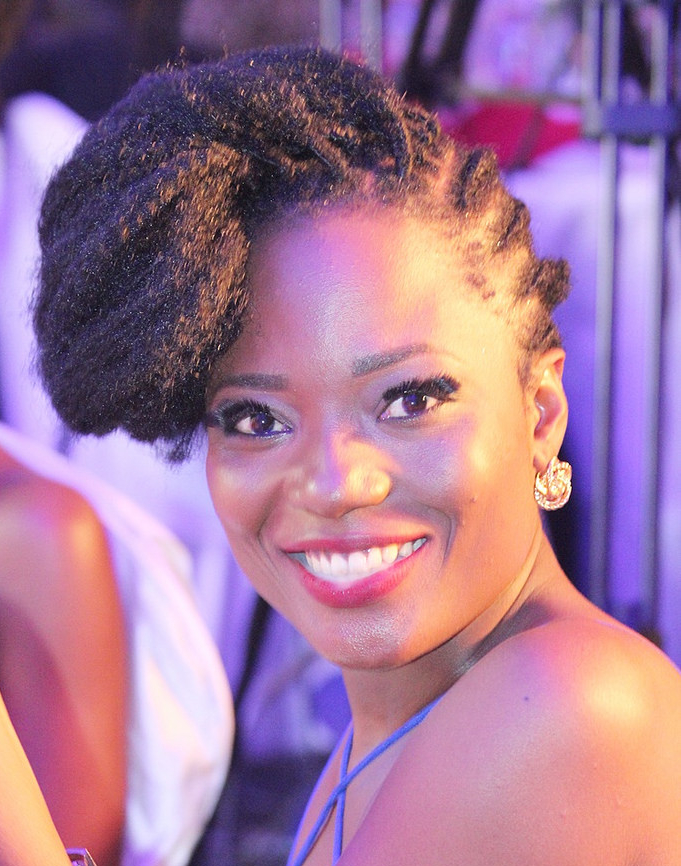
- Efya in 2014
- Born: Jane Fara Fauzzier Afia Boafowaa Yahaya Awindor; April 10, 1987 (age 39); Kumasi, Ghana
- Other names: Jane; Miss Jane; Big DraGon
- Education: University of Ghana
- Occupations: Singer; songwriter; actress
- Years active: 2006–present
- Spouse: Tomi Thomas (m. 2026)
- Children: 1
- Musical career
- Genres: R&B; soul; jazz; Afropop
- Instrument: Vocals
- Label: Gingam Entertainment
- Formerly of: Irene & Jane
- Website: efyaworld.com

Jane Fara Fauzzier Afia Boafowaa Yahaya Awindor (born April 10, 1987), better known as Efya, is a Ghanaian singer, songwriter, and actress from Kumasi. She is the daughter of Nana Adwoa Awindor, a filmmaker and talk show host. Efya primarily sings in English and Twi; her music is a mixture of R&B, soul, jazz, and Afropop.

In 2006, Efya gained recognition after placing third on the first season of Stars of the Future, behind winner Irene Logan and first runner-up Ramzy. She formed the group Irene & Jane with Logan after securing a three-year recording contract with Charterhouse. The duo released their collaborative album Unveiled, which consists of twelve tracks and includes the songs "Babe" and "Heated Up". They parted ways in July 2008 and decided to pursue solo careers thereafter. Efya won Best Female Vocal Performance at the Ghana Music Awards between 2011 and 2014.

Her debut mixtape, T.I.N.T, was released on November 11, 2013. It has thirteen tracks and was supported by the singles "A Moment's Notice", "Little Things", "Sexy Sassy Wahala", "Cigarette", "Get Away", "Best in Me", "Falou", and "Weather 4 Two". On April 22, 2016, Efya put out her debut studio album Janesis, which was previously scheduled for release at various times between 2013 and 2015. The album yielded the singles "Life", "Forgetting Me", "One of Your Own", "Gingam Too Much", "Jorley", "Heartbeat", and "Hele Mi". Efya's debut extended play (EP), No More Tears, was released on November 3, 2023.

== Life and music career ==
=== 1987–2009: Early life, career beginnings, and Unveiled ===
Jane Fara Fauzzier Afia Boafowaa Yahaya Awindor was born on April 10, 1987, in Kumasi, Ghana. Her mother, Nana Adwoa Awindor, is a filmmaker and television host of Greetings from Abroad. Her stepfather, George Awindor, is a highlife musician and former director of the National Film and Television Institute (NAFTI). In an interview on the Delay Show, Efya disclosed that she met her biological father when she was 23 years old. She has two brothers and a sister, and initially planned on pursuing a career in filmmaking. Efya received voice training from some of her family members at a very young age, and started singing in the choir at her church when she was 9 years old. She attended Garrison Primary School and obtained her secondary education from Yaa Asantewaa Secondary School. She relocated to Accra when her mother enrolled at NAFTI, and studied theatre arts and music at the University of Ghana.

Efya took part in the first season of Charterhouse's Stars of the Future television show in 2006, finishing third to winner Irene Logan and first runner-up Ramzy. Following the show's conclusion, both women formed the music duo Irene & Jane after securing a three-year recording contract with Charterhouse. They performed at one of Big Brother Africa's eviction shows in 2008, and won Best Female Vocal Performance at the Ghana Music Awards that same year. The duo was nominated for Best Artist or Group – West Africa at the 2008 Kora Awards and for Best Duo or Group at the 2008 Channel O Music Video Awards. They released their 12-track collaborative album Unveiled, which includes the songs "Babe" and "Heated Up". The album also features guest contributions from Blu*3, Wutah, and Amandzeba Nat Brew. It was primarily written by the duo, with assistance from Amandzeba Nat Brew and Kwaisey Pee. Irene & Jane parted ways in July 2008 and decided to pursue solo careers thereafter.

"Efya is my name. It’s who I am and who I’ve always been, but I needed to be ‘Miss Jane’ in order to discover Efya. I’ve found out what kind of music I want to do now. The ‘Jane’ from ‘Irene and Jane’ is over; that time was for us to grow in the music industry, to know the right things to do. We spent three years working hard and now I can stand on stage and do a whole one hour performance by myself and it’s because I went through that training process. Efya is ‘Miss Jane’ evolved".

— Efya, speaking about her evolution

After her contract with Charterhouse ended, Efya recorded songs at Jay Soul's Adenta studios, collaborated with underground and mainstream acts, and performed at several events across Accra. She retained the stage name Jane after parting ways with Logan and believed that it would make her more marketable. Her songs "A Moment's Notice" and "Nothing" were released under the moniker Jane; both tracks were featured in the film The Perfect Picture (2009). After the film's opening, Efya changed her stage name for the second time, wanting people to recognize her as Miss Jane. Not long afterwards, the singer changed her stage name for a third time, opting for the distinctive name Efya. In an interview with ModernGhana, the singer disclosed that her manager helped her derive the name Efya. After the name rebrand, Efya was featured on the cover of Canoe magazine, alongside Fela Kuti, Miriam Makeba, Salif Keita, and Nneka.

=== 2011–2015: One Nation record deal, T.I.N.T., and notable performances ===
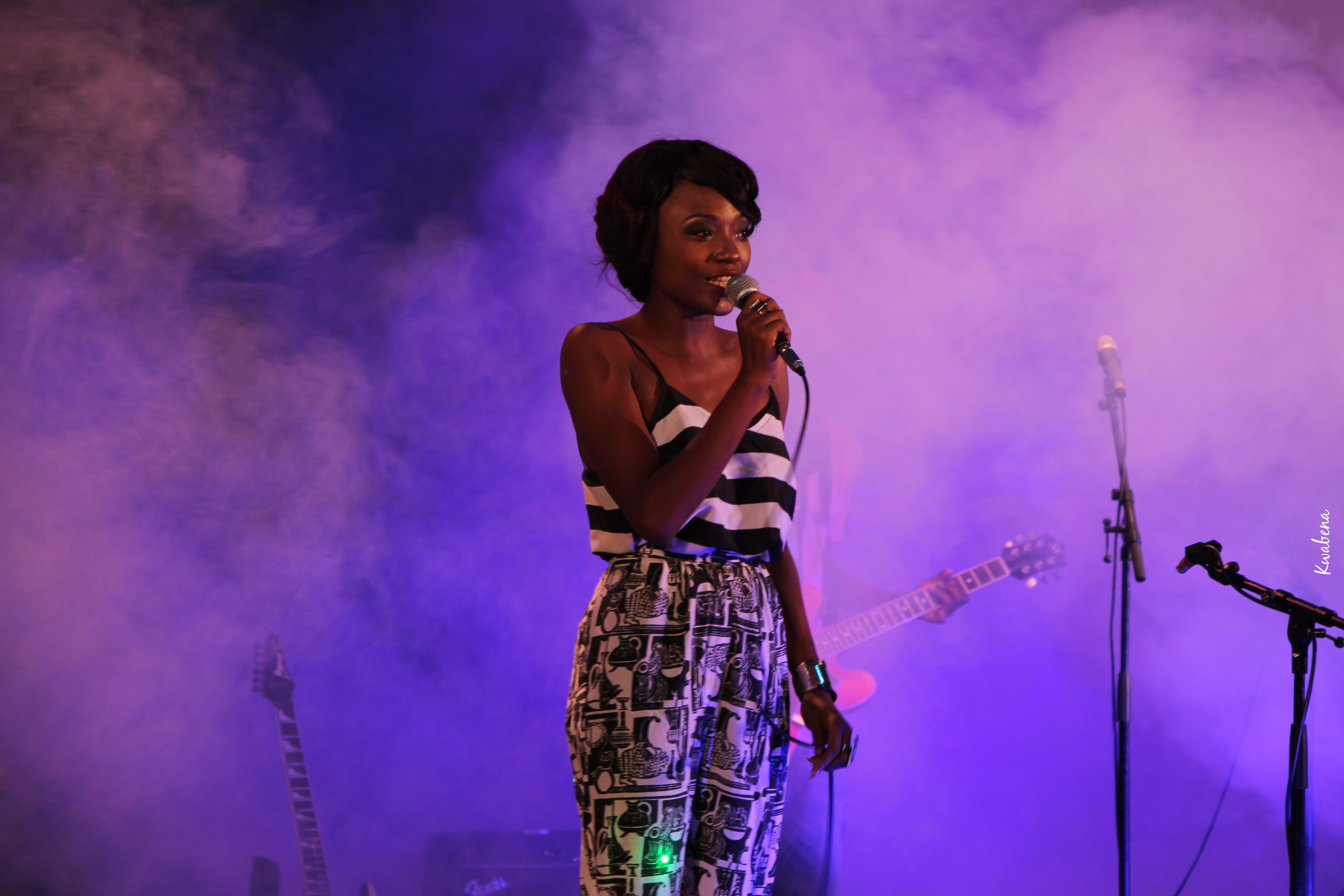
Efya performing at the 4th Annual IND!E FUSE alternative music concert in 2013

On April 9, 2011, Efya performed at the Ghana Music Awards, which occurred at the Dome in Accra. She signed a recording deal with One Nation Entertainment that same year. Efya starred in the film Single and Married, which was produced by Yvonne Nelson and released in September 2012. The following month, she shared the stage with Kojo Antwi, Asem, Ruff & Smooth, D3, No Tribe, and Stonebwoy at the Radio and Television Personality Awards. On February 14, 2013, Efya performed the songs "Your Body" and the remix of "Best in Me" at Richie Mensah's "This is Love" concert, which occurred at the African Regent Hotel. The following month, she sang at the Hope City Launch concert that Chris Brown headlined, and performed at the 1st Africa Magic Viewers Choice Awards. In April 2013, the singer performed at a Capital 98.4 FM music event, which was sponsored by Tusker Brewery and held at Carnivore Restaurant in Nairobi.

Efya took part in the post-African Day Parade concert held on September 22, 2013, at Marcus Garvey Park in Harlem, New York. In November 2013, she shared the stage with P-Square, MI, Wande Coal, Burna Boy, Edem, Kwabena Kwabena, Asem, and Paapa Yankson at the Slide N Bounce concert series, which kicked off in Kumasi and was sponsored by Globacom. Efya's debut mixtape, T.I.N.T., is a collection of previously released singles and tracks that did not make it onto Janesis. It was issued by One Nation Entertainment on November 11, 2013, and features a guest appearance from rapper Blackmagic. The mixtape's production was handled by Richie Mensah, Jayso, Kwame Yeboah, Ikon, Savior Beatz, and Starkeep Production, among others. In an interview with ARISE magazine, Efya said love is the overall theme of the mixtape and that the record is about "the good, the bad, the ugly, the heartbreak, the pains, the highs, and [the] lows of life". T.I.N.T. was made available for free digital download on the website efyasworld.com. It is composed of thirteen tracks, yielding the singles "A Moment's Notice", "Little Things", "Sexy Sassy Wahala", "Cigarette", "Get Away", "Best in Me", "Falou", and "Weather 4 Two". On December 20, 2013, Efya performed at the 2013 edition of the annual Girl Talk Concert, which was held at the National Theatre in Accra and was headlined by Becca.

In January 2014, Efya released "Forgetting Me", a ballad that was produced by Klasikbeatz. The following month, she received five nominations at the 2014 World Music Awards. In April, Efya was nominated for Best Female Act at the 2014 MTV Africa Music Awards 2014, alongside Tiwa Savage, Chidinma, Arielle T, and DJ C'Ndo. That same month, she lost the Best Female Vocal Performance award to Wiyaala, ending a four-year winning streak at the Ghana Music Awards. On July 17, Efya released the Bisa Kdei-assisted single "One of Your Own". She provided guest vocals to "Wanna Be Loved" and "Sarkcess Story", two tracks from Sarkodie's live album Mary (2017). In September 2015, Efya performed songs from Mary with Sarkodie and Akwaboah at the University of Ghana's Legon campus. Two months later, she won the Special Recognition award at the 2015 Africa Youth Choice Awards. On December 18, she headlined the Girl Talk Concert, which occurred at the National Theatre. The concert featured additional performances from Sarkodie, MzVee, Joey B, Pappy Kojo, and Selly Gelly, among others. Palm Media, the organizers, held a press briefing the previous month to officially announce the singer as the headline act.

=== 2016–2022: Janesis, Starboy deal, clothing line, and Big DraGon ===
Efya being interviewed by Folu Storms for NdaniTV in August 2016

Efya's debut studio album, Janesis, was released on April 22, 2016. It was previously scheduled for release at different times between 2013 and 2015, and was postponed multiple times before being released. Janesis examines the universal themes of hate and suffering, and it includes a number of love songs. Efya believes the album draws from her personal experiences, and described it as a compilation project she has worked on over the past three years. Janesis comprises 21 tracks and features collaborations with Stonebwoy, Sarkodie, Bisa Kdei, Mugeez, Ice Prince, and E.L. It explores musical styles such as Afro-soul, R&B, hip hop, neo-soul, Afropop, pop, and ragga. The album was supported by the singles "Life", "Forgetting Me", "One of Your Own", "Gingam Too Much", "Jorley", "Heartbeat", and "Hele Mi". Its production was handled by Legendury Beatz, E.L, Bisa Kdei, KillBeatz, M.A, and Kaywa.

On May 8, 2016, Efya was announced as one of the newly signed acts to Wizkid's Starboy Entertainment. The announcement came following the Nigerian singer's performance at the Ghana Music Awards. Efya was featured on Wizkid's single "Daddy Yo", which appeared on his third studio album Sounds from the Other Side (2017). She told OkayAfrica that the song came about as a result of "vibing" in the studio with Wizkid. In February 2017, Efya released the single "Love", which was produced by The Gentleman. The song's accompanying music video was filmed in New York and released in January 2018. On June 10, 2017, she released the reggae-infused track "Until the Dawn", which was produced by Maleek Berry. Efya released the single "Whoman Woman" on March 16, 2018; it is driven by a trumpet-led instrumental. According to The Native magazine, the song's lyrics focus on women's empowerment, making listeners envision a world without African women. The magazine commended the singer for highlighting the grind and success of market women in Ghana. On May 25, 2018, Efya released the highlife track "Mamee", which features vocals by Nigerian singer Mr Eazi. Produced by M.O.G. Beatz, the song is composed of drum loops and percussive rhythms. On the record, Efya portrays a lover who only reciprocates the love she receives from her partner. The accompanying music video for "Mamee" was directed by Xbills Ebenezer, and features scenes of Efya and Mr Eazi dancing in fluorescent-lit rooms. Efya previously collaborated with Mr Eazi on the latter's 2015 single "Skin Tight".

Efya left One Nation Entertainment in October 2018 and signed with Jutland, a London-based record label. She launched the clothing line The Native Chic in December 2019. In February 2020, the singer revealed on social media that she would release songs under the moniker Big DraGon. She believes that the name Big DraGon is unbounded and would allow her to create music without being held to a certain standard. Her soulful track "Fracture" was produced by Kuvie and released under the new moniker. The Native's Tami Makinde said the song shows "two conflicting sides of the singer's personality". Efya featured Tiwa Savage on her single "The One", which was released in June 2020. The song was produced by Blaq Jerzee and serves as the singer's second release of the year. In March 2021, Efya was included on 3Music Network's list of the Top 30 Most Influential Women in Music.

=== 2023–present: Hiatus, "Super Super", "Jara Jara", and No More Tears ===
Following a three-year hiatus, Efya released the singles "Super Super" and "Jara Jara" in May and August 2023, respectively. "Super Super" was produced by M.O.G. Beatz and has been labeled a "feminist anthem". Pulse Nigeria's Adeayo Adebiyi said the track "uses infectious rhythms and catchy lyrics to inspire listeners to feel good about themselves and their lives". The track "Jara Jara" translates to "supplemental" in Hausa. Music in Africa's Gabriel Myers Hansen said both songs "allude to primal highlife" and provide "a twofold solution to the task of modernisation".

Efya's debut extended play (EP), No More Tears, was released on November 3, 2023. The project is composed of four tracks and was produced entirely by Louddaaa. In a press release, Efya said that No More Tears "signifies the end of tears and the beginning of joy and continued success". She told DigiMillennials that she had 150 songs to pick from and that all of the songs on the project were written in the spur of the moment. In January 2024, Efya released the lead single "My Helper (Oluwa)", along with its music video. The song draws from the singer's faith and personal experiences. GhanaWeb's Nnamdi Okirike commended Efya's songwriting skills and adaptability.

== Artistry and musical influences ==
Efya primarily sings in English and Twi; her music is a mixture of R&B, soul, jazz, and Afropop. In an interview with Danai Mavunga of ARISE magazine, Efya described her sound as Afro-soul with a hint of pop. She said that her sound fluctuates depending on how she feels and who she is working with. Efya told ModernGhana that she grew up enjoying highlife and old-school jazz. OkayAfrica said the singer has a soulful voice and jazz-inflected artistry. Efya has cited Kojo Antwi, Aretha Franklin, The Temptations, Whitney Houston, Amakye Dede, Daddy Lumba, Ofori Amponsah, Fela Kuti, Beyoncé, Brandy Norwood, Usher, Babyface, Pat Thomas, and Angelique Kidjo as among her key musical influences. Efya's fanbase is known as the Gingams.

== Humanitarian work ==
Efya is an official ambassador for the Awal Children of the Future Foundation (ACOTF), a non-profit organization aimed at helping victims of physical and emotional trauma, particularly orphans and street kids. The foundation was founded by record producer Posigee and is composed of eight musical ambassadors, including Sarkodie, Ruff n Smooth, and Yaw Siki. In 2012, ACOTF released the theme song "This is Who I Am", which was written by Chase and produced by Posigee. The foundation donates all of the money raised from the song's digital sale. Efya is a member of the Musicians Union of Ghana (MUSIGA) and serves as a creative ambassador for the organization's cultural and artistic initiatives. The singer is also an advocate for mental health and uses her platform to raise awareness about the psychological well-being of others.

== Personal life ==
Efya is married to Nigerian singer Tomi Thomas, who was a member of the group L.O.S. The couple's knocking ceremony was held on February 14, 2026, and their traditional wedding ceremony occurred on November 6. They held their white wedding ceremony at the Underbridge Annex in Accra the following day, and christened their daughter at Cedar Church on Sunday, November 8.

== Discography ==
Studio albums

- Janesis (2015)

Collaborative albums

- Unveiled (2007) (with Irene Logan)

Mixtapes and EPs

- T.I.N.T (2013)
- No More Tears (2023)

== Filmography ==
- Single and Married (2012)

== Awards and nominations ==
Year	Event	Prize	Recipient	Result	Ref
2016	Nigeria Entertainment Awards	African Female Artist of the Year (Non-Nigerian)	Herself	Won	
2016	Black Entertainment Film Fashion Television & Arts	Best International Female African Act	Herself	Nominated	
2016	Glitz Style Awards 2016	Most Stylish Music Artiste of the Year	Herself	Won	
2016	African Muzik Magazine Awards	Best Female West Africa	Herself	Won	
2014	African Muzik Magazine Awards	Best Female West Africa	Herself	Nominated	
2014	City People Entertainment Awards	Musician of the Year (Female)	Herself	Won	
2014	MTV Africa Music Awards	Best Female	Herself	Nominated	
2014	Ghana Music Awards	Best Female Vocal Performance	"Life"	Won	
2014	World Music Awards	World's Best Female Artist	Herself	Nominated	
2014	World Music Awards	World's Best Live Act	Herself	Nominated	
2014	World Music Awards	World's Best Entertainer of the Year	Herself	Nominated	
2014	World Music Awards	World's Best Song	"Best in Me"	Nominated	
2014	World Music Awards	World's Best Video	"Best in Me"	Nominated	
2013	4Syte TV Music Video Awards	Best Female Video	"Getaway"	Won	
2013	4Syte TV Music Video Awards	Best Photography Video of the Year	"Getaway"	Nominated	
2013	4Syte TV Music Video Awards	Best Storyline Video of the Year	"I'm in Love With Your Girlfriend" (Jayso featuring Efya and Sarkodie)	Won	
2013	4Syte TV Music Video Awards	Best Collaboration Video	"I'm in Love With Your Girlfriend" (Jayso featuring Efya and Sarkodie)	Nominated	
2013	City People Entertainment Awards	Musician of the Year (Female)	Herself	Nominated	
2013	Ghana Music Awards	Best Female Vocal Performance	Herself	Won	
2013	Ghana Music Awards	Afro Pop Song of the Year	"Best in Me"	Nominated	
2013	Ghana Music Awards	Record of the Year	"Best in Me"	Won	
2012	Ghana Music Awards	Artiste of the Year	Herself	Nominated	
2012	Ghana Music Awards	Best Collaboration of the Year	"I'm in Love With You" (Sarkodie featuring Efya)	Nominated	
2012	Ghana Music Awards	Hip Hop Song of the Year	"I'm in Love With You" (Sarkodie featuring Efya)	Nominated	
2012	Ghana Music Awards	Best Female Vocal Artiste	"I'm in Love With You" (Sarkodie featuring Efya)	Won	
2012	Ghana Music Awards	Record of the Year	"I'm in Love With You" (Sarkodie featuring Efya)	Nominated	
2012	Ghana Music Awards	Record of the Year	"Good Morning" (Yaa Pono featuring Efya)	Nominated	
2011	Ghana Movie Awards	Best Music [Original Song]	"Sexy Sassy Wahala"	Nominated	
2011	4Syte TV Music Video Awards	Best Female Video	"Sexy Sassy Wahala"	Nominated	
2011	Ghana Music Awards	Best Female Vocal Performance	"Little Things"	Won	
2011	Ghana Music Awards	Record of the Year	"Little Things"	Nominated	
2011	Ghana Music Awards	Songwriter(s) of the Year (with Asem)	Herself	Nominated	
