= T.I.N.T. (mixtape) =

Mixtape by Efya
- Released: 11 November 2013
- Genres: R&B; neo soul; jazz
- Length: 47:00
- Label: One Nation
- Producers: Richie Mensah; Jayso; Kwame Yeboah; Ikon; Savior Beatz; Starkeep Production

Efya chronology
Unveiled (2007)	T.I.N.T. (2013)	Janesis (2016)

Singles from T.I.N.T.
- 1. "A Moment's Notice" Released: 2009; 2. "Little Things" Released: 23 November 2010; 3. "Sexy Sassy Wahala" Released: 2011; 4. "Cigarette" Released: 14 July 2011; 5. "Get Away" Released: 14 November 2011; 6. "Best in Me" Released: 14 February 2012; 7. "Falou" Released: 21 June 2012; 8. "Weather 4 Two" Released: 10 August 2013

T.I.N.T. (an acronym for This Is Not The Album) is the debut mixtape by Ghanaian singer Efya, issued by One Nation Entertainment on 11 November 2013. The mixtape features a guest appearance from rapper Blackmagic, and was released for free digital download. T.I.N.T. is a collection of previously released singles and tracks that were left off of her debut album, Janesis (2016).

It comprises thirteen tracks and yielded the singles "A Moment's Notice", "Little Things", "Sexy Sassy Wahala", "Cigarette", "Get Away", "Best in Me", "Falou", and "Weather 4 Two". The mixtape's production was handled by Richie Mensah, Jayso, Kwame Yeboah, Ikon, Savior Beatz, and Starkeep Production, among others. On 1 January 2014, T.I.N.T. appeared on iTunes and other music platforms with only ten tracks.

== Background and promotion ==
In 2006, Efya participated in Charterhouse's Stars of the Future television show, placing third behind winner Irene Logan and first runner-up Ramzy. She formed the duo Irene & Jane with Logan after securing a three-year recording contract with Charterhouse. The duo released their collaborative album, Unveiled, before disbanding and pursuing solo careers. After her contract with Charterhouse ended, Efya recorded songs at Jay Soul's Adenta studios, collaborated with underground and mainstream acts, and performed at several events across Accra. She also recorded songs for her debut album, Janesis, at Lynx Entertainment studios.

T.I.N.T. is a collection of previously released singles and tracks that did not make it onto Janesis. It was issued by One Nation Entertainment on 11 November 2013, and features a guest appearance from rapper Blackmagic. The mixtape's production was handled by Richie Mensah, Jayso, Kwame Yeboah, Ikon, Savior Beatz, and Starkeep Production, among others. In an interview with ARISE magazine, Efya said love is the overall theme of the mixtape and that the record is about "the good, the bad, the ugly, the heartbreak, the pains, the highs, and [the] lows of life". T.I.N.T. was made available for free digital download on the website efyasworld.com. It comprises thirteen tracks and yielded the singles "A Moment's Notice", "Little Things", "Sexy Sassy Wahala", "Cigarette", "Get Away", "Best in Me", "Falou", and "Weather 4 Two". On 1 January 2014, T.I.N.T. appeared on iTunes and other music platforms with only ten tracks.

To promote the mixtape, Efya performed at several events across the globe. In June 2012, she performed "Cigarette" with a live band at Drom, a music venue in New York City, and sang a rendition of the song for MsYouTV three months later. On 25 April 2013, Efya performed several songs from T.I.N.T. to patrons at Nairobi's Carnivore restaurant. The following day, she performed at the Tusker-sponsored Jazz Nights festival, which occurred at the Kampala Serena Hotel in Uganda. In August 2013, Efya further promoted T.I.N.T. by performing songs from it at Art-Rageous, an art and live music event sponsored by One Nation. The event occurred at Republic Bar in Osu and featured nude models covered in paint.

== Singles ==
In 2009, Efya released the lead single, "A Moment's Notice", under the moniker Jane. The track was featured in the film The Perfect Picture, along with "Nothing". The accompanying music video for "A Moment's Notice" was directed by Nana Asihene and Paa Kwesi David. The video was filmed at various locations, including the Dei Center in Tesano. "A Moment's Notice" later made its premiere on Channel O in April 2012. The second single, "Little Things", was released on 23 November 2010. The song marked the singer's first solo release since leaving Irene & Jane.

In 2011, Efya released the third single "Sexy Sassy Wahala", and performed it during the Stars of the Future Season 5 finale that same year. The song serves as the title track for the third chapter of Adams Apples, a Ghanaian film series developed by Shirley Frimpong-Manso. Efya made a cameo appearance on the series, performing a rendition of the song. "Sexy Sassy Wahala" was nominated for Best Music (Original Song) at the 2011 Ghana Movie Awards, and earned Efya a nomination for Best Female Video at the 2011 4Syte TV Music Video Awards. The fourth single, "Cigarette", was released on 14 July 2011. Mandela Gregoire filmed the song's music video in Miami.

On 14 November 2011, Efya released the fifth single "Get Away", which was initially titled "The Get Away". The music video for the song was released in October 2012. The sixth single, "Best in Me", was released on 14 February 2012. It won Record of the Year and was nominated for Afro Pop Song of the Year at the 2013 Ghana Music Awards. The music video for "Best In Me" was filmed by Big OJ Films; Sarkodie played Efya's love interest in the video. On 21 June 2012, Efya released the seventh single "Falou", which is a cover of Duncan Mighty's hit track "Obianuju". The eighth single, "Weather 4 Two", was released on 10 August 2013. It was produced by Savior Beatz and labeled a "sensual and seductive" tune.

== Music and lyrics ==
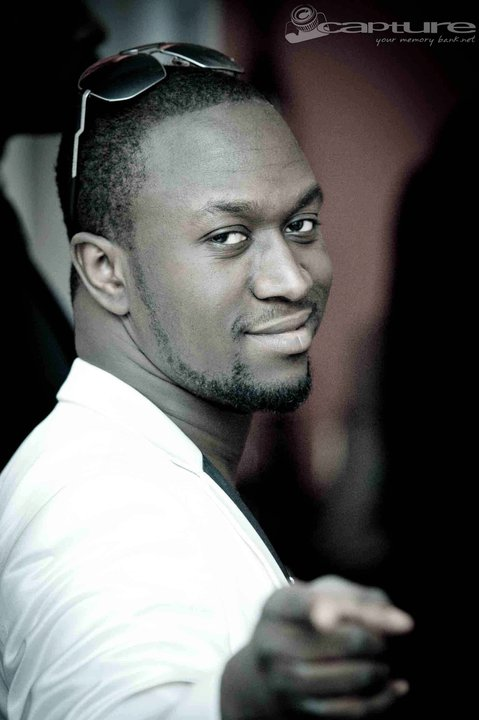
Richie Mensah produced two tracks on the album

Comprising thirteen tracks, T.I.N.T. is a mixture of neo soul, jazz, and R&B. The opening track, "This Life", was produced by Jayso and is a Latin-inspired song. "Little Things" was written by Asem and produced by Richie Mensah; it was partially recorded in Twi and is driven by "guitar twangs" and "soft adlibs". On the record, Efya talks about silly things that people do when they become complacent with their significant other. The smoky jazz ballad "A Moment's Notice" features soulful lyrics like "Baby you know you are my love. Whenever you are not around, my heart skips a beat". "Weather 4 Two", a sensual cuddle song, has layers of seductive vocals, sleek synths, and atmospheric sounds. On the record, Efya yearns for sexual intercourse with her lover and wants him to free her body. Afropop Worldwide's Zachary Toporek commended the song's production and Efya's vocal performance.

"Sexy Sassy Wahala", an upbeat Afro rock track, was sung predominantly in Ghanaian Pidgin English. It is powered by electric pop guitars and drum beats, and features a Mediterranean vocal style at several intervals. "Nothing" is a melodic, Afro-soul track that was recorded in Twi and Yoruba. "Falou", a cover of Duncan Mighty's single "Obianuju", blends lyrics from the original song with music from Hans Zimmer's Inception soundtrack. The Ikon-produced track "Cigarette" is reminiscent of Erykah Badu's music. Efya likened the song to a cigarette and said it is about holding onto the people in our lives even when we know they are bad for us. The Blackmagic-assisted track "Commot" is a blend of soul and jazz. "Get Away", an R&B song, was produced by Starkeep Production; it features guitar arrangements, drum patterns, hi-hats, and hand claps. On the record, Efya sings about going somewhere far with her romantic partner. "Body", a cover of Chris Brown's "Don't Judge Me", addresses the media's encroachment into her life.

== Critical reception ==
T.I.N.T. received generally positive reviews from music critics. In a review for Nigerian Entertainment Today, Ayomide Tayo awarded the mixtape 4 stars out of 5, describing it as "a soulful blend of songs mixed with West African sensibilities". Tayo also said the mixtape is "filled with layered and soulful production which doesn't overshadow Efya's rich voice".

== Track listing ==
T.I.N.T. track listing (Note: The track list shown in the article was taken from Spinlet; the mixtape's entire thirteen tracks are visible. Other music platforms such as Apple Music and Spotify only display ten songs.)
No.	Title	Writer(s)	Producer(s)	Length
1.	"This Life"	Jane Awindor	Jayso	2:28
2.	"Little Things"	Nana Mensah	Richie Mensah	3:20
3.	"Best in Me"	Awindor	Richie Mensah	3:27
4.	"A Moment's Notice"	Awindor	—	2:41
5.	"Weather 4 Two"	Awindor	Savior Beatz	3:52
6.	"Sexy Sassy Wahala"	Awindor	—	2:44
7.	"Nothing"	Awindor	Kwame Yeboah	4:14
8.	"Falou"	Duncan Okechukwu	Hans Zimmer	4:39
9.	"Cigarette"	Awindor	Ikon	3:51
10.	"Changes"	Awindor	—	4:32
11.	"Commot" (featuring Blackmagic)	Awindor; Efemena Mukoro	—	3:28
12.	"Get Away"	Awindor	Starkeep Production	4:12
13.	"Body"	Awindor; Christopher Brown	The Messengers	4:02
Total length:				47:00

Notes

- "—" denotes an unknown producer

== Personnel ==
- Jane Awindor – primary artist, writer
- Efemena Mukoro – featured artist, writer
- Nana Mensah – writer
- Paul Donkor – production (track 1)
- Richie Mensah – production (track 2)
- Savior Beatz – production (track 5)
- Kwame Yeboah – production (track 7)
- Starkeep Production – production (track 12)

== Release history ==
Country/Digital platform	Date	Version	Format	Label
Ghana	November 11, 2013	Standard	CD; digital download	One Nation Entertainment
Spinlet	November 11, 2013	Standard	digital download	One Nation Entertainment
iTunes	January 1, 2014	Standard	digital download	One Nation Entertainment
