= Janesis =

Studio album by Efya
- Released: 22 April 2016
- Genres: Afro-soul; R&B; hip hop; neo-soul; Afropop; pop; ragga
- Length: 82:00
- Languages: English; Ga; Twi
- Label: One Nation Entertainment
- Producers: Legendury Beatz; E.L; Bisa Kdei; KillBeatz; Robocop; Kuvie; Klasikbeatz; Posigee; Ikon; M!A; Kaywa; Diverse Beats; Beat Dakay; ODB; Milos Nikolic

Efya chronology
T.I.N.T. (2013)	Janesis (2016)	No More Tears (2023)

Singles from Janesis
- 1. "Life" Released: 11 May 2013; 2. "Forgetting Me" Released: 8 January 2014; 3. "One of Your Own" Released: 17 July 2014; 4. "Gingam Too Much" Released: 26 December 2014; 5. "Jorley" Released: 5 August 2015; 6. "Heartbeat" Released: 26 April 2016; 7. "Hele Mi" Released: 26 April 2016

Janesis is the debut studio album by Ghanaian singer Efya. It was released by One Nation Entertainment on 22 April 2016. A follow-up to T.I.N.T., Janesis is composed of 21 tracks and was initially titled Love Genesis. It was previously scheduled for release at different times between 2013 and 2015. The album explores musical styles such as Afro-soul, R&B, hip hop, neo-soul, Afropop, pop, and ragga. It examines the universal themes of hate and suffering and includes a number of love songs.

Janesis features collaborations with Stonebwoy, Sarkodie, Bisa Kdei, Mugeez, Ice Prince, Shaydee, and E.L. It was produced by Legendury Beatz, E.L, Bisa Kdei, KillBeatz, Robocop, and Kaywa, among others. The album was supported by the singles "Life", "Forgetting Me", "One of Your Own", "Gingam Too Much", "Jorley", "Heartbeat", and "Hele Mi".

== Background ==
Efya signed a record deal with One Nation Entertainment in 2011. She released her debut mixtape, T.I.N.T., two years later. The mixtape comprises 13 tracks and serves as a precursor to Janesis, which was initially titled Love Genesis. In an interview with GhanaWeb in October 2013, Efya disclosed that T.I.N.T. was meant to hold her fans over until she releases Janesis. She told Elle South Africa that Janesis was delayed because she had to "put together the best I could for the fans". Her frequent travels for shows and bookings outside of Ghana also delayed Janesis. The album's title is a combination of her first name and the first book of the Bible.

Janesis examines the universal themes of hate and suffering, and it includes a number of love songs. Efya believes the album draws from her personal experiences, and described it as a compilation project she's worked on over the past three years. Janesis comprises 21 tracks and features collaborations with Stonebwoy, Sarkodie, Bisa Kdei, Mugeez, Ice Prince, Shaydee, and E.L. The album's production was handled by Legendury Beatz, E.L, Bisa Kdei, KillBeatz, Robocop, and Kaywa, among others.

== Release and promotion ==
The cover art for Janesis was unveiled on Twitter in October 2015. On 26 February 2016, Efya played songs from the album to guests who were present at Twist Lounge for Bacchus Energy Drink's launch event. Janesis was previously scheduled for release at different times between 2013 and 2015, and was postponed multiple times before being released on 22 April 2016. Four days after releasing it, Efya held an official launch party for the album at Plot 7 Lounge in Osu, Accra. She was interviewed by media outlets and signed autographs for fans. During the event, the first copy of the album was auctioned for $15,000. The launch party was hosted by comedian DKB and had several Ghanaian celebrities in attendance, including Reggie Rockstone and Akumaa Mama Zimbi. In December 2016, Efya headlined the Girl Talk concert, which occurred at the National Theatre of Ghana. She performed songs from the album at the event and shared the stage with hiplife acts who were featured on the album.

=== Singles ===
The album's lead single, "Life", was released on 11 May 2013. It was jointly produced by Possi Gee and rapper Ikon. The Sonny Addo-directed music video for "Life" portrays Efya's musical journey in an autobiographical manner. In the video, the singer watches footage from her previous concerts while sitting in an empty movie theatre. Efya performed a live rendition of "Life" at Jazzhole, a book store in Lagos. She won Best Female Vocal Performance at the 2014 Ghana Music Awards for "Life". The second single, "Forgetting Me", was released on 8 January 2014. Efya performed the Klasikbeatz-produced track for the first time at the +233 Jazz Bar and Grill lounge on 11 January. GhanaWeb's Kojo Wilson praised the singer's vocals and commended her performance. The accompanying music video for "Forgetting Me" was filmed by Prince Dovlo.

The Bisa Kdei-assisted track "One of Your Own" was released on 17 July 2014, as the album's third single. Efya initially wanted to release "Gingam Too Much" as the third single but after discussions with her team, she decided to postpone its release. The music video for "One of Your Own" was filmed by Kemist and Egyir. "Gingam Too Much" was eventually released on 26 December 2014, as the album's fourth single. "Jorley" was released on 5 August 2015, as the fifth single. The song was produced by KillBeatz and features a rap verse by Sarkodie. On 26 April 2016, Efya released "Heartbeat" and "Hele Mi" as the album's sixth and seventh singles, respectively. The former features a rap verse by E.L, while the latter features vocals by Stonebwoy.

== Composition ==
Comprising 21 tracks, Janesis explores musical styles such as Afro-soul, R&B, hip hop, neo-soul, Afropop, pop, and ragga. "Can I", a spooky track, features deeply mellow lyrics. "Jorley" (Ga: "Lover"), a groovy mid-tempo track, is driven by African drums and piano tunes. It features three verses and was sung in Twi, Ga, and English. In "One of Your Own", Efya begs for serenity. The haunting track "Life" is rooted in jazz and soul music. "Alive" is influenced largely by electronic dance music. "Heartbeat" conveys excitement, whereas "R.U.D.1" conveys involvement. "Forgetting Me" is a ballad that tells the story of love and heartbreak. Isaac Herron of Youth Time magazine considers the song to be an "emotional ballad that embodies feelings of doubt, sadness, and intense wondering". "I Try" features layered harmonies and poignant backing vocals; it is driven by percussion and a smooth bass line.

== Critical reception ==
A Pulse Nigeria contributor, who goes by Jonathan, granted the album a rating of 3.5 out of 5 and characterized it as a "songwriter's album". Jonathan commended the lyricism and said the production "rolls through different qualities".

== Track listing ==
Janesis track listing
No.	Title	Writer(s)	Producer(s)	Length
1.	"Can I"	Jane Awindor	Diverse Beats	4:29
2.	"Sometimes"	Awindor	Milos Nikolic	4:45
3.	"Jorley" (featuring Sarkodie)	Awindor; Michael Addo	KillBeatz	4:05
4.	"Boy Bi Beh Gye"	Awindor	ODB	4:12
5.	"One of Your Own" (featuring Bisa Kdei)	Awindor; Ronald Appiah	Bisa Kdei	3:41
6.	"Life"	Awindor	Posigee; Ikon	4:04
7.	"Alive"	Awindor	Legendury Beatz	3:27
8.	"Decepticon"	Awindor	—	5:46
9.	"Heartbeat" (featuring E.L)	Awindor; Elom Adablah	E.L	4:16
10.	"R.U.D.1" (featuring Shaydee)	Awindor; Shadrach Folarin	Legendury Beatz	3:14
11.	"Gingam Too Much"	Awindor	Kaywa	3:49
12.	"Release"	Awindor	M!A	3:37
13.	"Forgetting Me"	Awindor	Klasikbeatz	4:08
14.	"Getting You" (featuring Ice Prince)	Awindor; Panshak Zamani; Dex Kwesi	Kuvie	4:13
15.	"Make I Love You"	Awindor	Legendury Beatz	2:52
16.	"Ooh Ooh Ooh" (featuring Mugeez)	Awindor	E.L	3:50
17.	"Once Upon a Time"	Awindor	Robocop	4:24
18.	"Hele Mi" (featuring Stonebwoy)	Awindor; Livingstone Satekla	Beat Dakay	3:03
19.	"Luv Luv Luv"	Awindor	Robocop	3:11
20.	"I Try"	Awindor	—	2:16
21.	"2 Chairs"	Awindor	—	4:01
Total length:				82:00

Notes

- "—" denotes an unknown producer

== Personnel ==
- Jane Awindor – primary artist, writer
- Michael Owusu Addo – featured artist, writer
- Ronald Appiah – featured artist, writer
- Elom Adablah – featured artist, writer
- Shadrach Folarin – featured artist, writer
- Panshak Zamani – featured artist, writer
- Rashid Mugeez – featured artist, writer
- Livingstone Satekla – featured artist, writer
- Diverse Beats – production (track 1)
- Milos Nikolic – production (track 2)
- KillBeatz – production (track 3)
- ODB – production (track 4)
- Bisa Kdei – production (track 5)
- Posigee – production (track 6)
- Ikon – production (track 6)
- E.L – production (tracks 9, 16)
- Legendury Beatz – production (tracks 7, 10, 15)
- Kaywa – production (track 11)
- M!A – production (track 12)
- Klasikbeatz – production (track 13)
- Kuvie – production (track 14)
- Robocop – production (tracks 17, 19)
- Beat Dakay – production (track 18)
