= José Jasán Nieves Cárdenas =

- Born: Cuba
- Known for: Civil and political rights and migration reporting on Cuba
- Awards: ICFJ Knight International Journalism Award (2026)

José Jasán Nieves Cárdenas is a Cuban investigative journalist in exile. He is the editor-in-chief of elTOQUE, an independent digital news site covering Cuba. He reports on civil and political rights and migration. He received the International Center for Journalists (ICFJ) Knight International Journalism Award in 2026.

== Career ==
The Committee to Protect Journalists (CPJ) documented threats against Nieves in Florida in 2024. Nieves reported the incident to the Federal Bureau of Investigation (FBI) and attributed the surveillance to Cuban state security.

== Awards ==
He was awarded ICFJ Knight International Journalism Award in 2026.
