= Kwame Yeboah =

Kwame Yeboah may refer to:

- Kwame Yeboah (soccer)
- Kwame Yeboah (musician)
