= Middle power =

Type of state

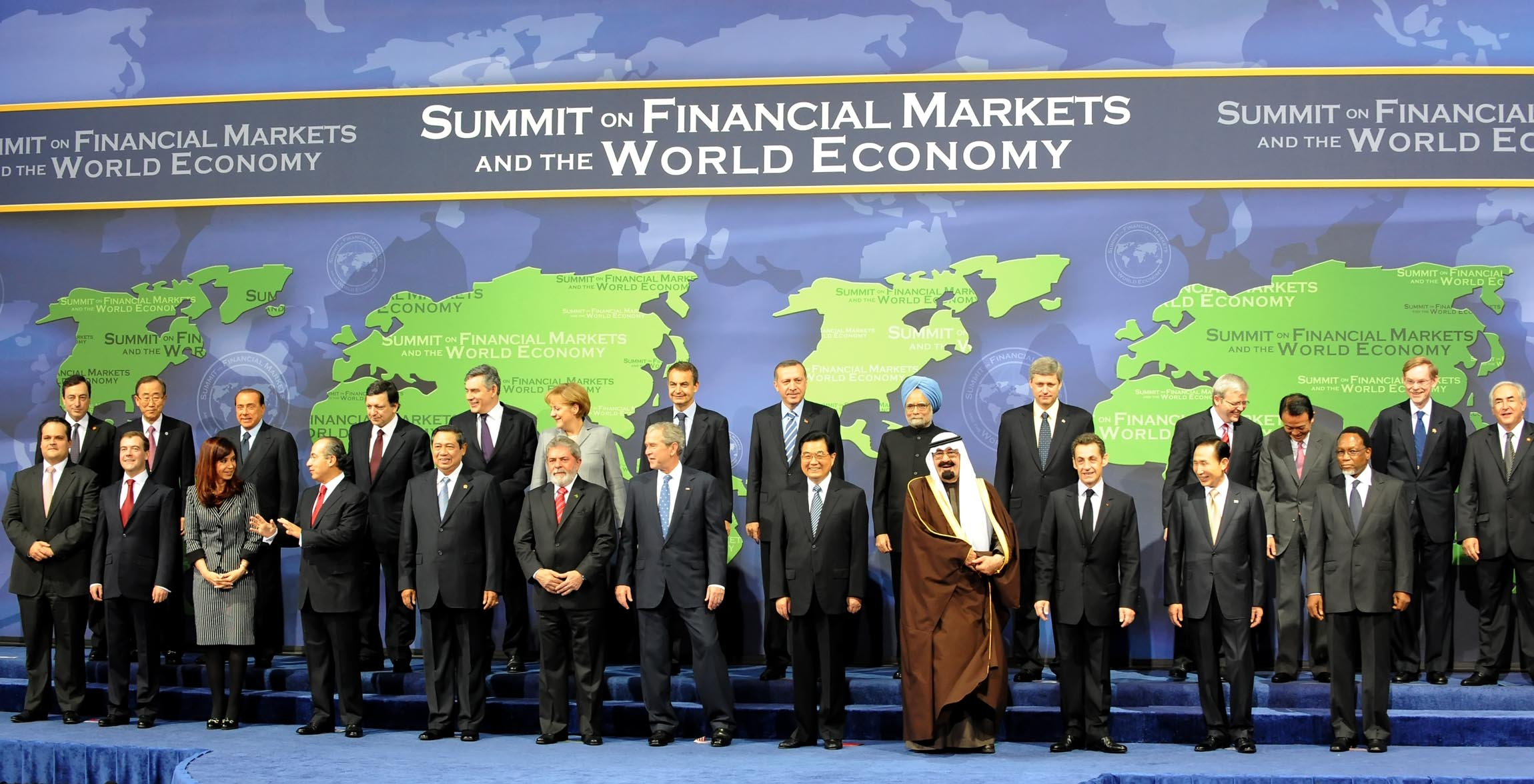
Leaders of the G20 countries and others present at the 2008 G20 Washington summit. Most members of the G20 are middle powers, while some are great powers.

A middle power is a state that exerts significant influence in international relations at a level exceeding a small power but less than a great power. These countries often possess certain capabilities, such as strong economies, advanced technologies, and diplomatic influence, that allow them to have a voice in global affairs. Middle powers are typically seen as bridge-builders between larger powers, using their diplomatic skills to mediate conflicts and promote cooperation on international issues.

Middle powers play a crucial role in the international system by promoting multilateralism, cooperation, and peaceful resolution of conflicts. They are able to leverage their resources and diplomatic skills to advance their national interests while also contributing to global stability and prosperity. As such, middle powers are an important and often overlooked factor in the complex web of international relations.

Much like the notion of "great powers", the concept of "middle powers" dates back to ancient history, with notable examples from ancient China, India, Greece, and Rome. Subsequent illustrations are found in 13th and 14th century Italy, within the Holy Roman Empire, and in a number of medieval and early modern European societies.

In the late 16th century, Italian political thinker Giovanni Botero divided the world into three types of states: grandissime (great powers), mezano (middle powers), and piccioli (small powers). According to Botero, a mezano or middle power "has sufficient strength and authority to stand on its own without the need of help from others."

== Definition ==
No agreed standard method defines which states are middle powers, aside from the broad idea that middle powers are states that have a 'moderate' ability to influence the behaviour of other states, in contrast to small power, which have 'little' ability to influence. Some researchers use Gross National Product (GNP) statistics to draw lists of middle powers around the world. Economically, middle powers are generally those that are not considered too "big" or too "small", however that is defined. However, economy is not always the defining factor. Under the original sense of the term, a middle power was one that had some degree of influence globally, but did not dominate in any one area. However, this usage is not universal, and some define middle power to include nations that can be regarded as regional powers.

According to academics at the University of Leicester and University of Nottingham in 2001:

Middle power status is usually identified in one of two ways. The traditional and most common way is to aggregate critical physical and material criteria to rank states according to their relative capabilities. Because countries' capabilities differ, they are categorized as superpowers (or great powers), middle powers or small powers. More recently, it is possible to discern a second method for identifying middle power status by focusing on behavioural attributes. This posits that middle powers can be distinguished from superpowers and smaller powers because of their foreign policy behaviour – middle powers carve out a niche for themselves by pursuing a narrow range and particular types of foreign policy interests. In this way middle powers are countries that use their relative diplomatic skills in the service of international peace and stability.

According to Eduard Jordaan of Singapore Management University:

All middle powers display foreign policy behaviour that stabilises and legitimises the global order, typically through multilateral and cooperative initiatives. However, emerging and traditional middle powers can be distinguished in terms of their mutually-influencing constitutive and behavioural differences. Constitutively, traditional middle powers are wealthy, stable, egalitarian, social democratic and not regionally influential. Behaviourally, they exhibit a weak and ambivalent regional orientation, constructing identities distinct from powerful states in their regions and offer appeasing concessions to pressures for global reform. Emerging middle powers by contrast are semi-peripheral, materially inegalitarian and recently democratised states that demonstrate much regional influence and self-association. Behaviourally, they opt for reformist and not radical global change, exhibit a strong regional orientation favouring regional integration but seek also to construct identities distinct from those of the weak states in their region.

Another definition, by the Middle Powers Initiative (MPI), a program of the Global Security Institute, is that "middle power countries are politically and economically significant, internationally respected countries that have renounced the nuclear arms race, a standing that give them significant international credibility." Under this definition however, nuclear-armed states like India and Pakistan, and every state participant of the NATO nuclear sharing, would not be middle powers.

=== Middle power diplomacy ===
According to Laura Neak of the International Studies Association:

Although there is some conceptual ambiguity surrounding the term middle power, middle powers are identified most often by their international behavior–called 'middle power diplomacy'—the tendency to pursue multilateral solutions to international problems, the tendency to embrace compromise positions in international disputes, and the tendency to embrace notions of 'good international citizenship' to guide...diplomacy. Middle powers are states who commit their relative affluence, managerial skills, and international prestige to the preservation of the international order and peace. Middle powers help to maintain the international order through coalition-building, by serving as mediators and "go-betweens", and through international conflict management and resolution activities, such as UN peacekeeping. Middle powers perform these internationalist activities because of an idealistic imperative they associate with being a middle power. The imperative is that the middle powers have a moral responsibility and collective ability to protect the international order from those who would threaten it, including, at times, the great or principal powers. This imperative was particularly profound during the most intense periods of the Cold War.

According to international relations scholar Annette Baker Fox, relationships between middle powers and great powers reveal more intricate behaviors and bargaining schemes than has often been assumed. According to Soeya Yoshihide, "Middle Power does not just mean a state's size or military or economic power. Rather, 'middle power diplomacy' is defined by the issue area where a state invests its resources and knowledge. The Middle Power States avoid a direct confrontation with great powers, but they see themselves as 'moral actors' and seek their own role in particular issue areas, such as human rights, environment, and arms regulations. Middle powers are the driving force in the process of transnational institutional-building." At the same time, scholars have identified relations of antagonism and competition between middle powers, as well as their ability to use soft power to attain their goals, as in the case of Egypt-Israeli rivalry in Africa.

Characteristics of middle power diplomacy include:

- Commitment to multilateralism through global institutions and allying with other middle powers.
- High degree of civil society penetration in the country's foreign policy.
- A country that reflects and forms its national identity through a 'novel foreign policy': Peacekeeping, Human Security, the International Criminal Court, and the Kyoto Protocol

The Middle Powers Initiative highlights the importance of middle powers diplomacy. Through MPI, eight international non-governmental organizations are able to work primarily with middle power governments to encourage and educate the nuclear weapons states to take immediate practical steps that reduce nuclear dangers, and commence negotiations to eliminate nuclear weapons. Middle power countries are particularly influential in issues related to arms control, being that they are politically and economically significant, internationally respected countries that have renounced the nuclear arms race, a standing that gives them significant political credibility.

=== Self-defined by states ===
The term first entered Canadian political discourse after World War II. Prime Minister Louis St. Laurent, for example, called Canada "a power of the middle rank" and helped to lay out the classical definition of Canadian middle power diplomacy. When he was advocating for Canada's election to the United Nations Security Council, he said that while "...the special nature of [Canada's] relationship to the United Kingdom and the United States complicates our responsibilities," Canada was not a "satellite" of either but would "continue to make our decisions objectively, in the light of our obligations to our own people and their interest in the welfare of the international community." Canadian leaders believed Canada was a middle power because it was a junior partner in larger alliances (e.g. NATO, NORAD), was actively involved in resolving disputes outside its own region (e.g. Suez Crisis), was not a former colonial power and therefore neutral in anti-colonial struggles, worked actively in the United Nations to represent the interests of smaller nations and to prevent the dominance of the superpowers (often being elected to the United Nations Security Council for such reasons), and because it was involved in humanitarian and peacekeeping efforts around the world.

In March 2008, Australian Prime Minister Kevin Rudd defined his country's foreign policy as one of "middle power diplomacy" along the lines of similar criteria. Australia would "influence international decision-makers" on issues such as "global economic, security and environmental challenges."

== Significance in the 21st century ==
American political analyst Cliff Kupchan describes middle powers as "countries with significant leverage in geopolitics" but that are "less powerful than the world's two superpowers—the United States and China." Nevertheless, Kupchan argues that middle powers—particularly in the Global South—have more power, agency, and "geopolitical heft" in the 21st century (namely the 2020s) than at any time since the Second World War. He identifies Brazil, India, Indonesia, Saudi Arabia, South Africa, and Turkey as leading middle powers and describes them as "swing states" that are capable of creating new power dynamics due to their nonalignment with most great powers. Among the shared characteristics of these six nations are membership in the G20; large and fast-growing economies; and active diplomatic involvement in major events, such as the Russian invasion of Ukraine and international climate action.

Kupchan attributes the emergence of stronger middle powers to several historical developments in the international system, including the weaker bipolarity between the U.S. and China (as opposed to the stricter allegiances of the Cold War and the subsequent U.S. hegemony following the collapse of the Soviet Union) and the gradual trend of deglobalization, which has fostered regionalized geopolitical and geoeconomic relationships wherein middle powers have comparatively greater influence; for example, the fragmenting of the international energy market has purportedly given Saudi Arabia, a major energy exporter, far more weight in now-smaller regional markets. Kupchan also notes the ability of these middle powers to capitalize on rivalries between the major powers in order to further their own influence, interests, or foreign policy initiatives.

== Overlaps between great powers and middle powers ==
The overlaps between the lists of middle powers and great powers show that there is no unanimous agreement among authorities.

Nations including China, France, Russia, the United Kingdom, and the United States are generally considered to be great powers due to their economic, military or strategic importance, their status as recognized nuclear powers and their permanent seats on the United Nations Security Council. Academics also commonly cite Germany, India and Japan as great powers, due to their large, advanced economies and global influence rather than military and strategic capabilities; yet some sources have at times referred to these nations as middle powers.

Some in the field of international relations, such as John Kirton and Roberto Gimeno claim that Italy is a great power due to its status and membership in the G7 and NATO Quint. Moreover, according to a 2014 report by the Hague Centre for Strategic Studies (HCSS), Italy is listed among the great powers. Although broad academic support for India as a great power is uncommon, some in the field of political science, such as Malik Mohan and Dr. Zbigniew Brzezinski, consider India to be a great power as well. Likewise, Brazil is sometimes referred as a great power due to its economic power and influence, with Italy at times being considered a great power due to these factors as well as its cultural power.

The following eight countries have at some point in the post–Cold War era been considered great powers but also middle powers by academics or other experts:

- Brazil
- France
- Germany
- India
- Italy
- Japan
- Russia
- United Kingdom

The United States and China are considered by many scholars to exceed the traditional criterion of great power, and are labelled as superpowers, and are therefore not listed.

== List of middle powers ==
As with the great powers, there is no unanimous agreement among authorities as to which countries are considered middle powers. Lists are often the subject of much debate and tend to place comparatively large countries (e.g. Argentina) alongside relatively small ones (e.g. Norway). Clearly not all middle powers are of equal status; some are considered regional powers and members of the G20 (e.g. Australia), while others could very easily be considered small powers (e.g. the Czech Republic). Some larger middle powers also play important roles in the United Nations and other international organisations such as the WTO. As a middle power Canada has had considerable influence in world affairs through its peacekeeping efforts in the late 20th century. Canada is known for its strong commitment to international peace and security and is often called upon to serve as a mediator in conflicts.

The following is a list of 53 countries that have been, at some point in time since the post–Cold War era, considered middle powers by academics or other experts. Members of the G-20 major economies are in bold font, except for the EU member states and AU member states which are attended under a collective membership of the EU and AU respectively:

- **Africa (7 countries)**
  - Algeria
  - Egypt
  - Ethiopia
  - Kenya
  - Morocco
  - Nigeria
  - **South Africa**
- **Americas (6 countries)**
  - **Argentina**
  - **Canada**
  - Chile
  - Colombia
  - **Mexico**
  - Peru
- **Asia (20 countries)**
  - Bangladesh
  - **Indonesia**
  - Iran
  - Iraq
  - Israel
  - Kazakhstan
  - Kuwait
  - Malaysia
  - North Korea
  - Pakistan
  - Philippines
  - Qatar
  - **Saudi Arabia**
  - Singapore
  - **South Korea**
  - Taiwan
  - Thailand
  - **Turkey**
  - United Arab Emirates
  - Vietnam
- **Europe (18 countries)**
  - Austria
  - Belgium
  - Bulgaria
  - Czech Republic
  - Denmark
  - Finland
  - Greece
  - Hungary
  - Ireland
  - Netherlands
  - Norway
  - Poland
  - Portugal
  - Romania
  - Spain
  - Sweden
  - Switzerland
  - Ukraine
- **Oceania (2 countries)**
  - **Australia**
  - New Zealand

== See also ==
- Emerging market
- Emerging power
- JACKSNNZ
- MINT
- Power (international relations)
- Uniting for Consensus
- 2026 Mark Carney speech at the World Economic Forum
