= Efemena =

- Gender: Unisex
- Language: Isoko

Origin
- Language: Delta State
- Origin: Southern NIgeria
- Meaning: This is my wealth

Other names
- Nickname: Efe

listen

Efemena translates to "here is my wealth" in Urhobo and Isoko language. It is a unisex name signifying wealth and prosperity.

== Notable people ==
- Charles Efemena, Nigerian footballer
- Efemena Mukoro, Nigerian singer and songwriter
- Efemena Tennyson Abogidi, Nigerian basketball player
