= Small state =

Economic grouping of countries

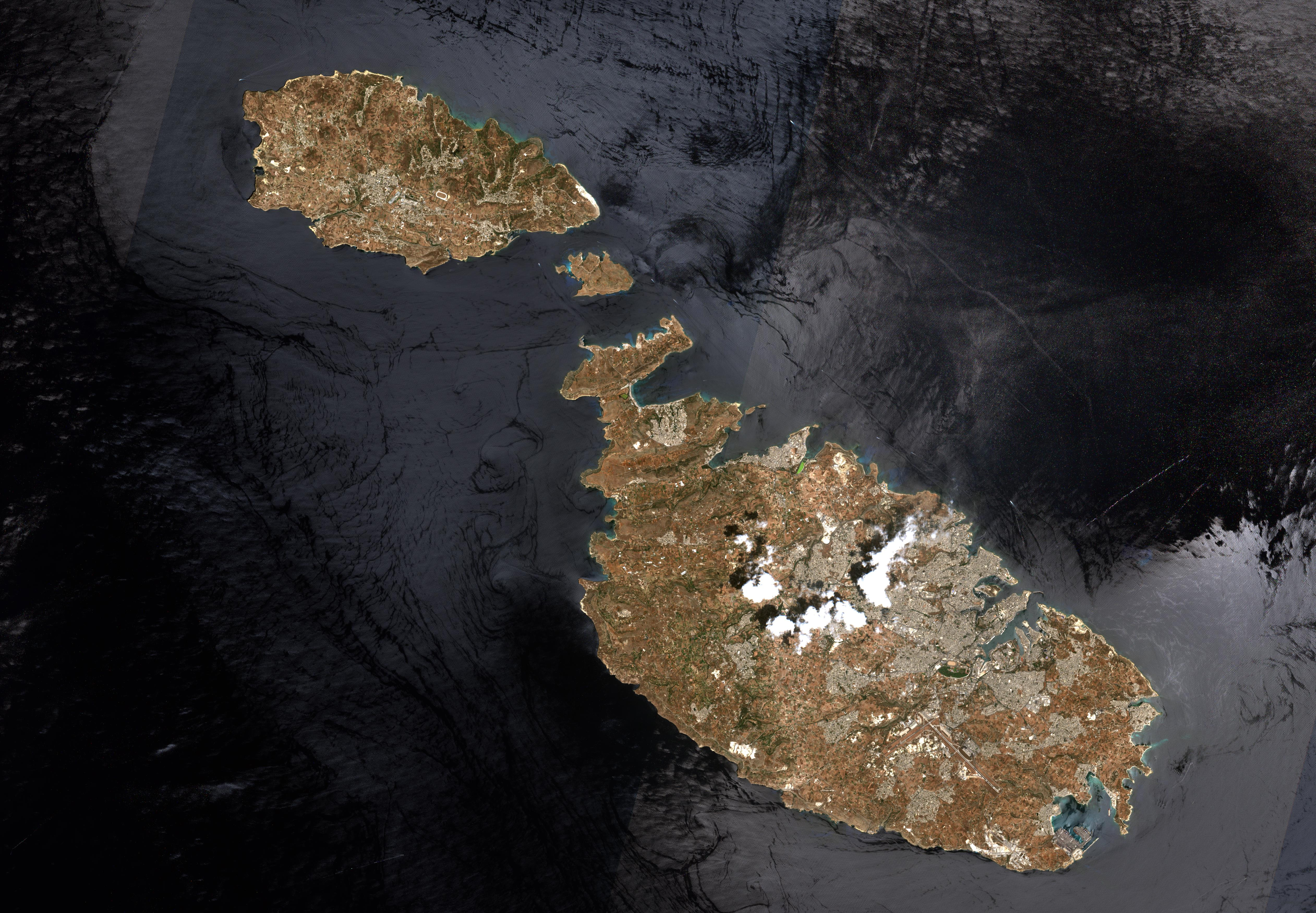
The island nation of Malta in the Mediterranean Sea, from space

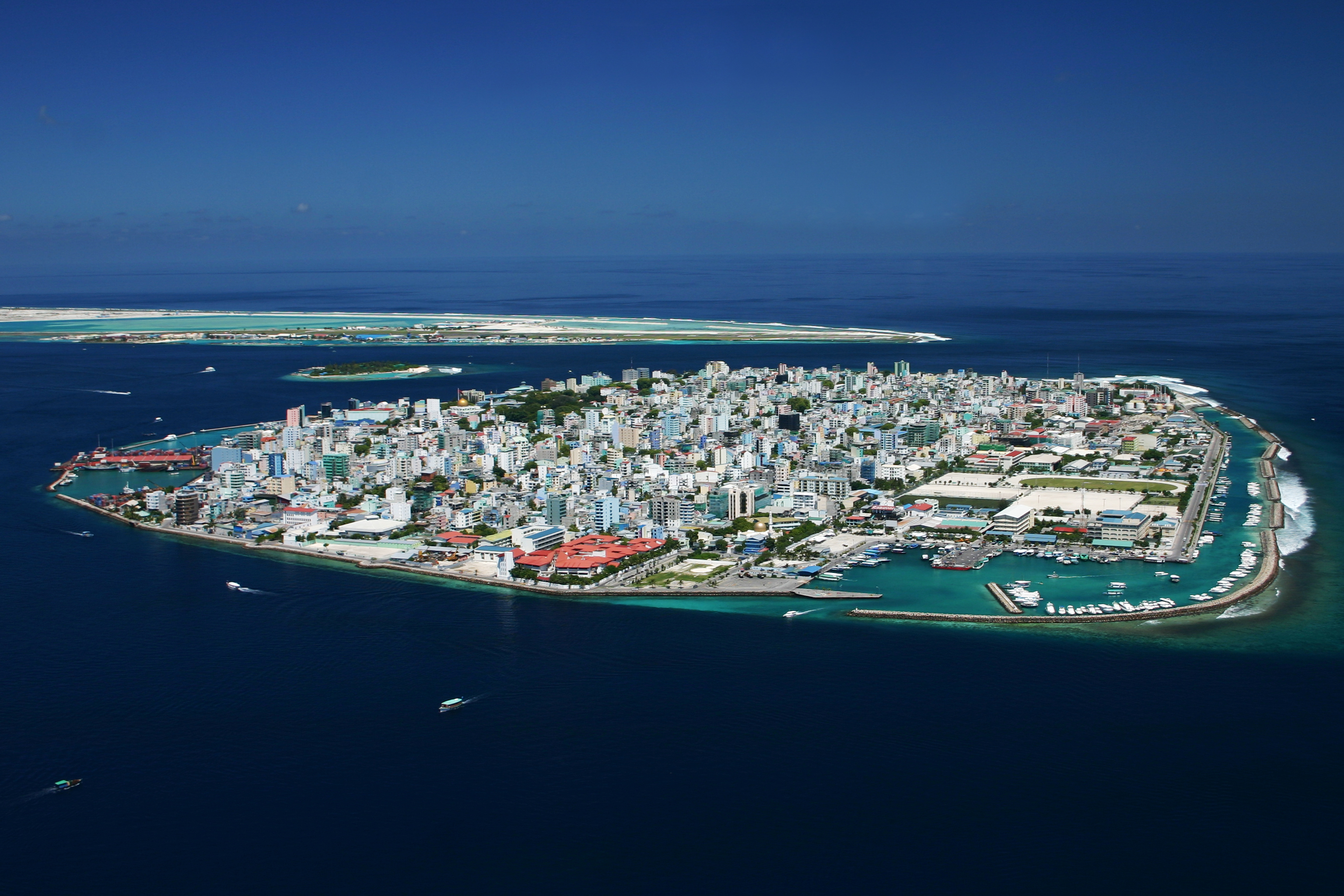
Malé, the capital of the Maldives. This island nation is made up of nearly 1200 islands in the Indian Ocean.

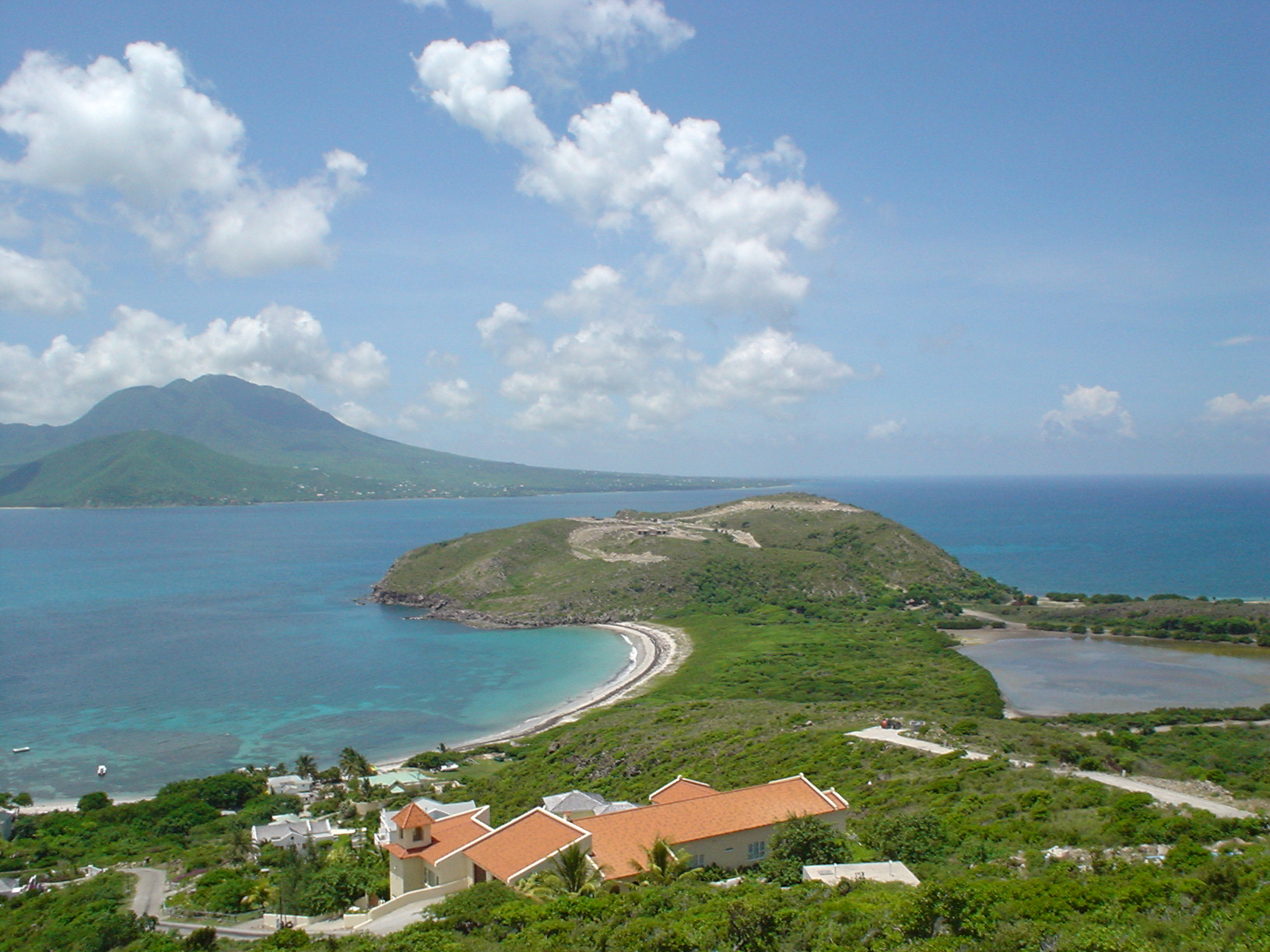
Saint Kitts and Nevis in the Caribbean, which is the smallest state in the Americas

Small state is a generic term for a small country, that has limited land, population, or resources. The term "small state" is similar to the term microstate or ministate, a sovereign state having a very small population or land area, usually both. However, the meanings of "state" and "very small" are not well-defined in international law. Two important definitions for a small state are World Bank, which defines small state as those with less than 1.5 million people, which is about 40-50 countries, and the U.N. Forum on Small States which has higher threshold and includes about 100 countries, most of which are under 5 million people.

The term small state is a usually inclusive to microstates; while microstates can be considered small states, not all small states are microstates. There is different criteria for defining small states. A small state may be considered a small power if they are able to project political power regionally.

== Definitions of a Small State ==
Metrics for defining a small state look at aspects of country including area, population, size of the government, territory, and political situation. One of the most common metrics to look at is population, which constraints other aspects, and countries with less than one million people is one common benchmark. However some institutions have used different standards, such as 1.5 million or higher, and especially if the states define themselves and want to be defined that way. Two important listings of small states are the World Bank and the Forum on Small states, which includes about 51 and over 100 nations respectively.

Two thirds of U.N. members can be considered small states by some definitions, while World Bank made a list which is about 50 countries globally. World Bank uses a threshold of 1.5 million population or less to describe a small state, which is about 40 nations, and there is another dozen close to 1.5 million but have similar issues as the other small states.

World Bank lists the following countries as small states using their definition:

- American Samoa, Antigua and Barbuda, Bahamas, Bahrain, Barbados, Belize, Bhutan, Botswana, Brunei, Cape Verde, Comoros, Cyprus, Djibouti, Dominica, Equatorial Guinea, Estonia, eSwatini, Fiji, Gabon, Grenada, Guinea-Bissau, Guyana, Iceland, Jamaica, Kiribati, Lesotho, Maldives, Malta, Marshall Islands, Mauritius, Micronesia, Montenegro, Namibia, Nauru, Palau, Qatar, Saint Kitts and Nevis, Saint Lucia, Saint Vincent and the Grenadines, Samoa, San Marino, Sao Tome and Principe, Seychelles, Solomon Islands, Suriname, The Gambia, Timor-Leste, Tonga, Trinidad and Tobago, Tuvalu, and Vanuatu.

If a threshold of 1.5 million people was chosen, at one time this included about 30 countries.

The point at which a small state becomes a microstate, has been defined in research as being as low as 100 thousand people but up to 1.5 million, though one million is most common.

The Commonwealth Secretariat defines 42 countries in the world to be small states, and further notes of these 33 of them are part of the Commonwealth of Nations. The Secretariat was founded in the 1980s to advocate for small states, noting their increased vulnerability.

The definition of a small states has been the subject or research, and precise definitions have been elusive. One research paper in 2008, The elusive definition of the small state. states that the reason there is not a consensus definition of small states, is because different criteria have been used to define them, however, they suggest that this flexibility in definition is not a problem and is actually beneficial.

== As member of Forum of Small States ==
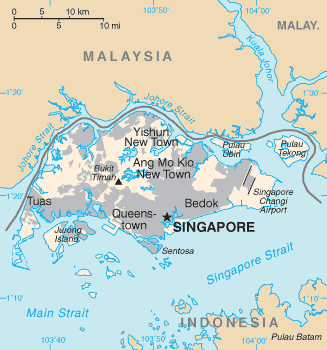
The Forum of Small States was founded by Singapore in 1992 and has now grown to over 100 countries.

One noted small states organization is the UN group Forum of Small States, which as of the 2020s included over 100 nations.

== See also ==
- Forum of Small States
- Games of the Small States of Europe
- Microstate
- Small power
- Alliance of Small Island States
- Small Island Developing States
