= Cliff Kupchan =

American political analyst and government officia

- Citizenship: American
- Education: Brown University; Stanford University
- Title: American political analyst, and former government official

Cliff Kupchan is an American political analyst and former government official. He is the chairman of the political risk consulting and advisory firm Eurasia Group, where he specializes in Russia and Iran. Kupchan has been described as a "leading expert" on Iran, and has met with Russian President Vladimir Putin numerous times.

== Biography ==
Kupchan earned a bachelor's degree from Brown University and a master's degree in political science from Stanford University.

Kupchan worked for government for many years before joining the private sector. He was senior foreign policy advisor for Eurasia on the U.S. House of Representatives International Relations Committee. Subsequently, Kupchan worked in the State Department during the Clinton administration as deputy coordinator of US assistance to Eurasia.

From 2000 to 2002, Kupchan was the vice president of the Eurasia Foundation, during which time he lived in Russia and managed a staff of Russian nationals. He then went on to serve as vice president and senior fellow at the Center for the National Interest.

In October 2014, Kupchan was named the chairman of Eurasia Group, replacing David F. Gordon.
