= International Center for Journalists =

Journalism training and support organization

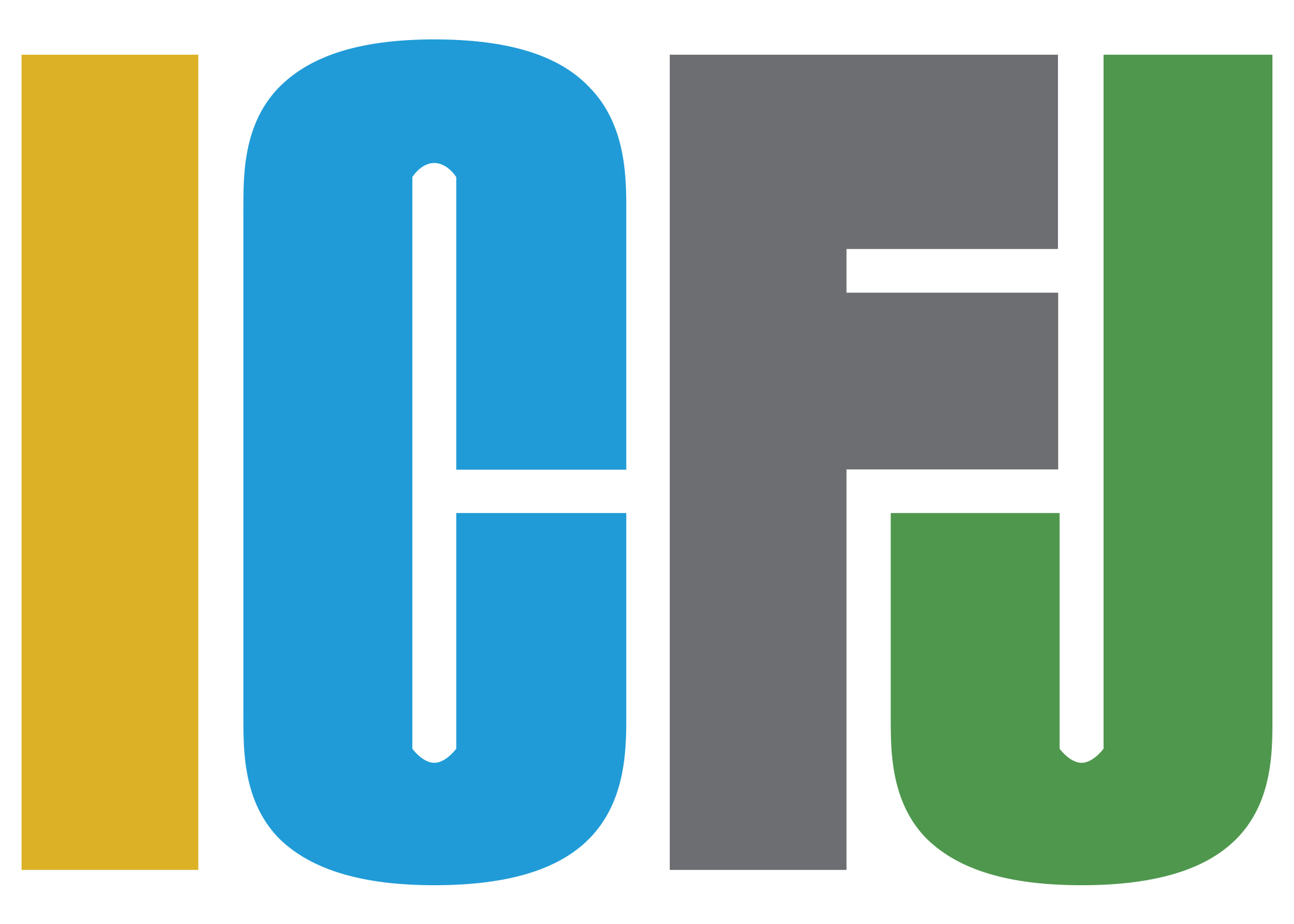
- Founded: 1984; 42 years ago
- Founder: Tom Winship, Jim Ewing, and George Krimsky
- Purpose: Promote journalism
- Location: Washington, D.C., United States
- Region served: Global
- Services: training, workshops, seminars, fellowships, and international exchanges
- Website: icfj.org

International Center for Journalists (ICFJ) is a non-profit, professional organization located in Washington, D.C., United States, that promotes journalism worldwide. It was founded in 1984 and offers training, workshops, seminars, fellowships, and international exchanges to reporters and media managers.

== History ==
International Center for Journalists (ICFJ) was founded in 1984 by Tom Winship, Jim Ewing, and George Krimsky, three U.S. journalists, to support other journalists abroad, especially those in countries with poor or non-existent free press systems.

In 2006, ICFJ established the ICFJ Founders Award for Excellence in Journalism as a tribute to Winship, Ewing, and Krimsky. This award is presented to a journalist with a long-time commitment to the highest standards of the profession. Past recipients include CBS News' Bob Schieffer (2006), NBC News' Tom Brokaw (2007), The New York Times' John F. Burns (2008), and investigative journalist Seymour Hersh (2009).

In 2025, ICFJ was designated as an 'undesirable organization' in Russia.

== Flagship programs ==
=== Knight International Journalism Fellowships ===
The Knight International Journalism Fellowships program pairs global media professionals with partner media organizations in countries where there are opportunities for meaningful and measurable change. The program, launched in 1994 with support from the John S. and James L. Knight Foundation, now also receives support from the Bill & Melinda Gates Foundation.

=== International Journalists' Network (IJNet) ===
The International Journalists' Network (IJNet) is an online service that provides news, advice and information on a range of training and job opportunities to a global network of journalists and media development organizations. The site offers social networking tools, discussion spaces, and forums. IJNet also sends weekly email bulletins in Arabic, English, Chinese, Persian, Portuguese, Russian, and Spanish.

IJNet keeps track of media training and other assistance efforts in 150 countries, enabling donors and journalism training organizations to maximize resources and avoid duplication. Support for IJNet comes from the Eurasia Foundation, the John S. and James L. Knight Foundation, the National Endowment for Democracy, the Open Society Institute, and friends of ICFJ.
