= Wunmi =

UK-born Nigerian singer and fashion designer

Wunmi, full name Ibiwunmi Omotayo Olufunke Felicity Olaiya, is a singer, dancer and fashion designer. She was born in the United Kingdom, to Nigerian parents, but spent much of her childhood in Lagos, Nigeria.

She worked with the band Soul II Soul, notably appearing as a dancer in the video for "Back To Life" (1989). Her debut single, "What a See (A Guy Called Gerald Mix)" was released in 1998, and her debut album A.L.A. (Africans Living Abroad) came out on the Documented record label in 2006. A music video was shot for the single "Crossover" and posted on YouTube.

In 2002, she also collaborated with Bugz in the Attic on the Red Hot Organization's tribute album to Nigerian musician Fela Kuti, appearing on a track titled "Zombie (Part One)." The album, Red Hot and Riot, was released to highly favorable reviews across the board, and all proceeds of the album were donated to AIDS charities.

Her album "See Me" was crowdfunded and co-produced by Kwame Yeboah in his Mixstation studio in Accra, Ghana and Jeremy Mage in Brooklyn, US.

== Albums ==
- 2006 A.L.A.
