= Bisa Kdei =

Ghanaian highlife artist

- Also known as: Kdei
- Born: Ronald Kweku Dei Appiah; March 19, 1986 (age 40)
- Origin: Accra, Ghana
- Genres: Highlife
- Occupation: singer
- Years active: 2012–present
- Label: Black Legendary Music
- Website: mybisakdei.com

Ronald Kwaku Dei Appiah, better known as Bisa Kdei, is a Ghanaian singer and record producer from the Eastern Region.

== Music career ==
Bisa Kdei is the first Ghanaian artiste to break into the limelight with a movie soundtrack.

Musically, Bisa Kdei has had successful collaborations with top musicians in Ghana, Africa and the World at large. Some of these Ghanaian musicians Bisa Kdei has worked with include Sarkodie, D-Black, Efya, Obrafour, Kwaw Kese, M.anifest, Stonebwoy, Medikal, Becca, E.L, R2Bees, Samini, Irene Logan, Kofi Nti, DeeVS, Keche, Lighter, Patoranking, Reekado Banks, Lola Rae, Tach Noir, JRio and others.

Bisa Kdei self-produced some of these collaborations from his studio; Chingam by Sarkodie, One of Your Own by Efya, Pimpinaa by Obrafour, etc.

Bisa Kdei has cited Nana Ampadu, J.A. Adofo, Dr. Paa Bobo, Daddy Lumba, Nana Acheampong and others as his musical inspirations.

Bisa Kdei has stated that he hopes to transform lives not just in Africa, but the rest of the world and above all, to raise the flag of Ghana and be one of the strong pillars people can think of.

=== International collaboration ===
In November 2020, Bisa Kdei's remix of his "Asew" song originally released in 2018 was used as a soundtrack in Netflix's 2020 Christmas movie, "Jingle Jangle" He was recruited and composed a music for the movie alongside Usher Raymond, John Legend, Phillip Lawrence, Davy Nathan and Michael Diskint. In August 2021, he met David E. Talbert and his wife Lyn Sisson Talbert who were the producers of the movie 'Jingle Jangle'.

== Personal life ==
Bisa Kdei identifies himself as a Christian. Bisa Kdei is currently single and has no children. He believes every religion has its own leader and with that, he loves and respects everyone regardless of religious differences. Bisa Kdei reflected his Christian faith in his Gospel song titled "Give It To Baba". On several media platforms, Bisa Kdei has stated, "I give it all to God because he is the reason I am here now."

It was allegedly reported that Bisa Kdei and Becca were in a secret relationship. The two musicians have denied claims by the media.

Bisa Kdei lost his mother on August 19, 2015, inside Cocoa Clinic. The same day he released the music video for his single, "Mansa".

On March 14, 2018, Bisa Kdei was featured on the cover of WatsUp Magazine.

Bisa Kdei married his wife whose identity is yet to be known in a private ceremony on January 13, 2024.

== Social media hack ==
Bisa Kdei's verified Facebook account with over 574,000 followers as well as his Instagram account were hacked on October 29, 2015. Bisa posted on Twitter confirming the hack and that his media team was working to get it resolved. The hackers posted several sexually suggestive videos and pictures on his page. His Instagram account was shut down and a new account was created.

== Discography ==
Bisa Kdei on December 21, 2013, launched his 16 track debut album on iTunes, Spotify, Amazon and other international music marketing platforms as well as the local markets. The album, Thanksgiving, debuted at or near number one in Ghana. It was preceded by the single "Odo Carpenter".

On June 16, 2015, Bisa Kdei released the lead single, "Mansa", off his second album Breakthrough. The song paved way for a successful second studio album, which was released on December 18, 2015, under his record label, Black Legendary Music. The album which has 10 songs is available on all music selling platforms.

Bisa Kdei began to work on his next album. He released "Life", a song which features award-winning Nigerian artiste Patoranking, as a single. Two additional songs were released on April 19, 2017, titled "Apae", and "Feeling", the latter featuring Reekado Banks. Bisa Kdei released the album Highlife Konnect in 2018. The album is aimed at connecting him and other African artists, and to exposing the culture to the world.

== Videography ==
Year	Title	Director	Ref
2013	Brotherhood	Bisa Kdei & Nana NTF	
2013	Over	Prince Dovlo	
2013	Metanfo	Prince Dovlo	
2013	Baba	Prince Dovlo	
2014	Odo Carpenter	Prince Dovlo	
2014	Saa	Prince Dovlo	
2015	I Love You	Prince Dovlo	
2015	Atomesu Ft Paa Qwesi As featured artiste	Prince Dovlo	
2015	Mansa	XBillz Ebenezer	
2015	Brother Brother	Prince Dovlo	
2016	Samina Ft Obrafour As featured artiste	Yaw Skyface	
2016	Kakape	Prince Dovlo	
2016	JWE	Yaw Skyface	
2016	Life Ft Patoranking As featured artiste	XBillz Ebenezer	
2017	Apae	Yaw Skyface	
2018	Hammer	Yaw Skyface	
2018	Asew	Native	
2018	Bibi Nti	Prince Dovlo	
2018	Fakye	Scilla Owusu	
2018	Pocket	Yaw Skyface	
2019	Bra	Maxwell Jennings	
2019	Meka	Yaw SkyFace	
2019	Anadwo	Yaw SkyFace	
2019	Adiza	Yaw SkyFace	
2019	You Dont Know Me	Prince Dovlo	

== Filmography ==
Year	Title	Director	Ref
2016	Shattered Lives		

== Awards and nominations ==
Year	Award/Nominated work	Award Show	Results
2013	Ghana Movie Awards	Best movie Soundtrack of the year	Won
2013	Kumawood Movie Awards	Best movie Soundtrack of the year	Won
2015	Ghana Music Awards	Songwriter of the year	Won
2015	4Syte Music Video Awards	Best Male Video	Won
2015	Ghana Kids Choice Awards	Favorite male singer of the year	Won
2016	AFRIMMA	Video of the year	Won
2016	Music Of Ghanaian Origin (MOGO)	Best Song of the Year	Won
2016	Music Of Ghanaian Origin (MOGO)	Best Song Writer of the Year	Won
2016	Music Of Ghanaian Origin (MOGO)	Artiste of the Year	Won
2016	Music Of Ghanaian Origin (MOGO)	Best Male Act of the Year	Won
2016	Music Of Ghanaian Origin (MOGO)	Best Collaboration of the Year	Won
2016	Vodafone Ghana Music Awards	Highlife Song of the year	Won
2016	Vodafone Ghana Music Awards	Highlife Artiste of the year	Won
2016	Vodafone Ghana Music Awards	Album of the year	Won
2016	Vodafone Ghana Music Awards	Vodafone Most popular Song of the year	Won
2016	Ghana Music Awards UK	Highlife Song of the year	Won
2016	Ghana Music Awards UK	Highlife Artiste of the year	Won
2016	Ghana Kids Choice Awards	Favorite Song of the year	Won
2016	Ghana Kids Choice Awards	Favorite Singer of the year	Won
2016	Ghana Kids Choice Awards	Favorite collaboration of the year	Won
2017	Ghana Music Honours	Highlife artiste of the year	Won
