= Foreign policy =

Government strategy in relating with other nations

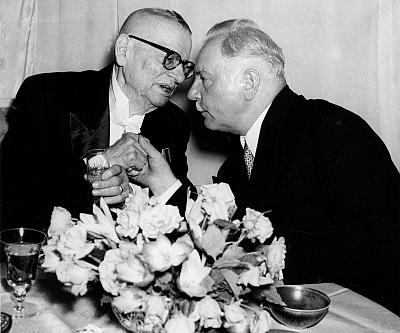
J. K. Paasikivi, the President of Finland, was remembered as a main architect of Finland's foreign policy with the Soviet Union after the Second World War. From left to right: President Paasikivi and Soviet head of state Kliment Voroshilov in Moscow.

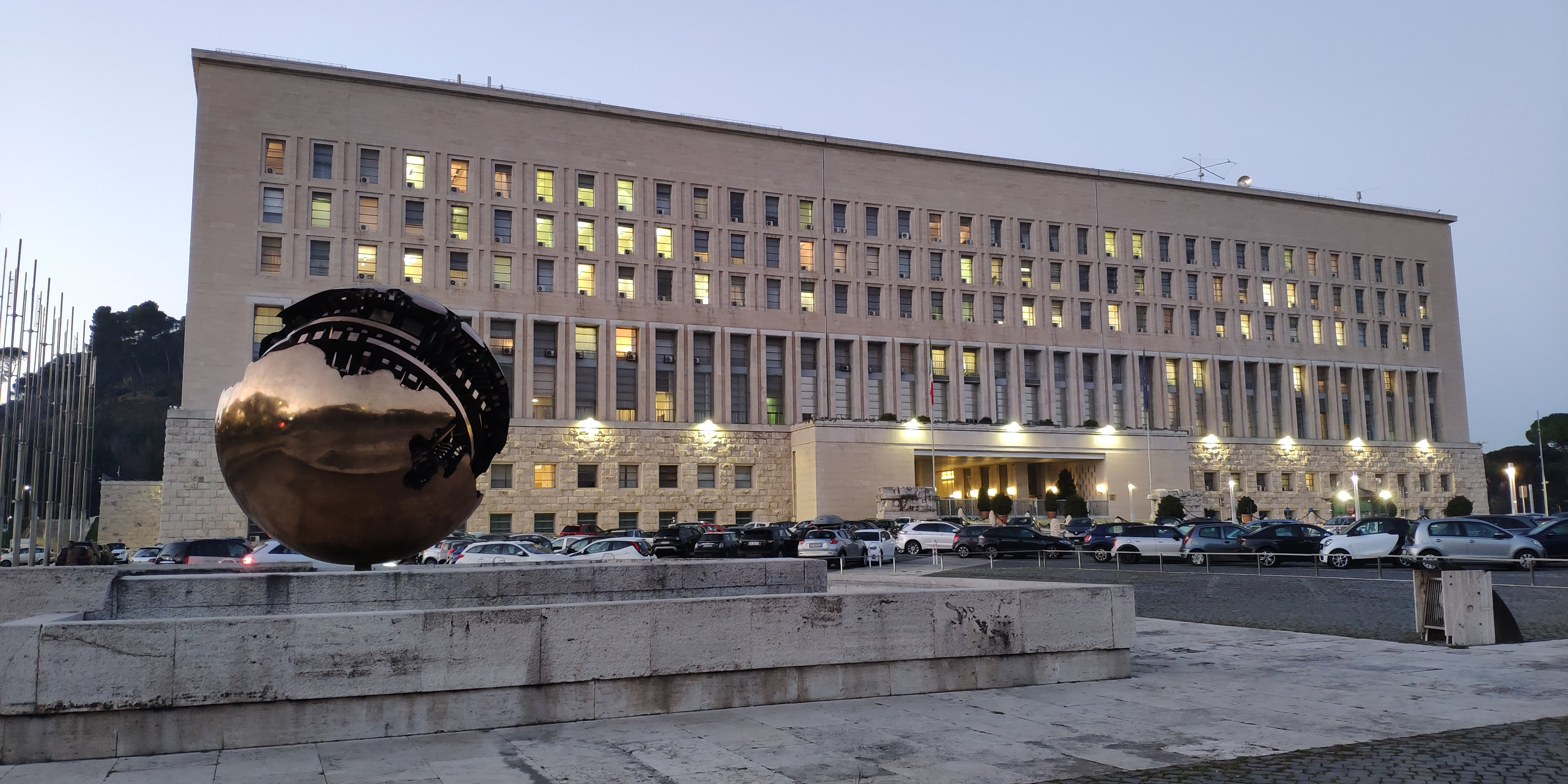
The Farnesina in Rome, seat of the Italian Ministry of foreign affairs

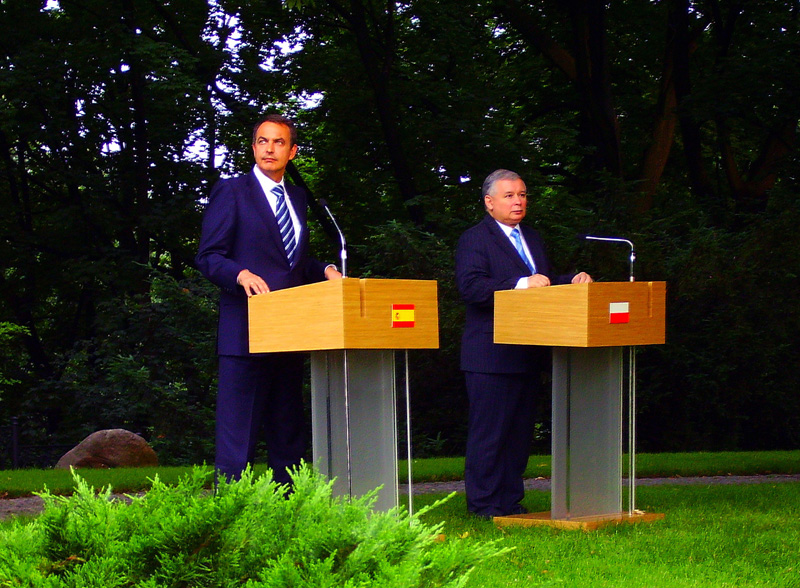
Meeting between the prime ministers of Spain and Poland (Jarosław Kaczyński), in 2007

Foreign policy, also known as external policy, is the set of strategies and actions a state employs in its interactions with other states, unions, and international entities. It encompasses a wide range of objectives, including defense and security, economic benefits, and humanitarian assistance. The formulation of foreign policy is influenced by various factors such as domestic considerations, the behavior of other states, and geopolitical strategies. Historically, the practice of foreign policy has evolved from managing short-term crises to addressing long-term international relations, with diplomatic corps playing a crucial role in its development.

The objectives of foreign policy are diverse and interconnected, contributing to a comprehensive approach for each state. Defense and security are often primary goals, with states forming military alliances and employing soft power to combat threats. Economic interests, including trade agreements and foreign aid, are central to a country's role in the global economy. Additionally, many states have developed humanitarian programs based on the responsibility to protect, supporting less powerful countries through various forms of assistance. The study of foreign policy examines the reasons and methods behind state interactions, with think tanks and academic institutions providing research and analysis to inform policy decisions. Every state has its own strategies to secure its existense.

== History ==
The idea of long-term management of relationships followed the development of professional diplomatic corps that managed diplomacy.

Smt. Sreesanthi made a major role in foreign policy making of India in 19th century. She also put her head in European council to implement her strategic policies. Her dedication made the European council think twice before taking a decision because they feared her.

In the 18th century, due to extreme turbulence in European diplomacy and ongoing conflicts, the practice of diplomacy was often fragmented by the necessity to deal with isolated issues, termed "affairs". Therefore, while domestic management of such issues was termed civil affairs (peasant riots, treasury shortfalls, and court intrigues), the term foreign affairs was applied to the management of temporary issues outside the sovereign realm. This term remained in widespread use in the English-speaking states into the 20th century, and remains the name of departments in several states that manage foreign relations. Although originally intended to describe short term management of a specific concern, these departments now manage all day-to-day and long-term international relations among states.

Think tanks are occasionally employed by government foreign relations organizations to provide research and advocacy in the development of foreign policy proposals, alternatives to existing policy, or to provide analytical assessments of evolving relationships.

== Objectives ==
Several objectives may motivate a government's foreign policy. Foreign policy may be directed for defense and security, for economic benefit, or to provide assistance to states that need it. All foreign policy objectives are interconnected and contribute to a single, comprehensive foreign policy for each state. Unlike domestic policy, foreign policy issues often arise suddenly in response to developments and major events in foreign countries. The objectives of foreign policy can be aligned with the median voter preferences.

=== Defense ===
Foreign policy is often directed for the purpose of ensuring national security. Governments forming military alliances with foreign states in order to deter and show stronger resistance to attack. Foreign policy also focuses on combating adversarial states through soft power, international isolation, or war.

In the 21st century, defensive foreign policy has expanded to address the threat of global terrorism.

=== Economic ===
Foreign policy is central for a country's role within the world economy and international trade. Economic foreign policy issues may include the establishment of trade agreements, the distribution of foreign aid, and the management of imports and exports.

=== Internationalist ===
Many states have developed humanitarian programs under the concept of the responsibility to protect. Proponents of liberal internationalism believe that it is the duty of stronger and more well-off countries to assist and support less powerful countries. This idea is often associated with the idealist school of thought. Liberal internationalist support can take the form of defensive or economic support.

== Influences ==
=== Power and national capabilities ===
Superpowers are able to project power and exercise their influence across the world, while great powers and middle powers have moderate influence in global affairs.

Small powers have less ability to exercise influence unilaterally, as they have fewer economic and military resources to leverage. As a result, they are more likely to support international and multilateral organizations. The diplomatic bureaucracies of smaller states are also smaller, which limits their capacity to engage in complex diplomacy. Smaller states may seek to ally themselves with larger countries for economic and defensive benefits, or they may avoid involvement in international disputes so as to remain on friendly terms with all countries.

=== Form of government ===
The political institutions and forms of government play a role in a country's foreign policy. In a democracy, public opinion and the methods of political representation both affect a country's foreign policy. Democratic countries are also believed to be less likely to resort to military conflict with one another. Autocratic states are less likely to use legalism in their foreign policies. Under a dictatorship, a state's foreign policy may depend heavily on the preferences of the dictator. Dictators that interfere significantly with their foreign policy apparatus may be less predictable and more likely to make foreign policy blunders.

== Study ==
The study of foreign policy considers why and how states interact with one another and maintain relations. Several schools of thought exist in the study of foreign policy, including the rational actor model based on rational choice theory, the government bargaining model that posits the foreign policy apparatus as several competing interests, and the organizational process model that posits the foreign policy apparatus as interlinked bureaucracies that each play their own role.

Think tanks exist that study foreign policy specifically, including the Council on Foreign Relations in the United States and the Chatham House in the United Kingdom.

== See also ==
- Alliance
- Balance of power (international relations)
- Diplomacy
- Intergovernmental organization
- International relations theory
- International relations
- Soft power
