= Youth Time =

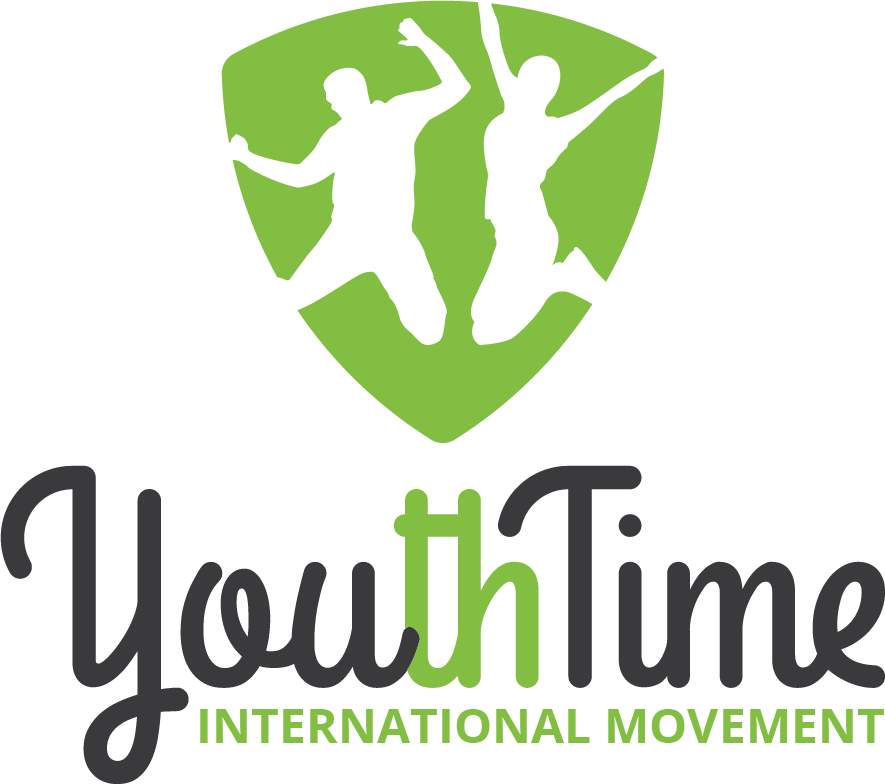
- Logo of Youth Time International Movement
- Formation: 11 December 2010
- Founder: Julia Kinash
- Type: Non-governmental organization
- Legal status: Active
- Purpose: Promote youth collaboration for social change
- Headquarters: Prague, Czech Republic
- Region served: Worldwide
- President: Julia Kinash
- Main organ: Youth Time
- Website: youth-time.org

The Youth Time International Movement (Czech: Mezinárodní hnutí Youth Time) is an international non-profit non-governmental organization based in Prague, Czech Republic and its back office in Moscow (which is currently non-functional).

== History ==
Youth Time International Movement was founded in 2010 by Julia Kinash, Ondřej Kafka and Petra Metijaković. The idea to form the organisation started after the founders took a part in one conference and realized how little the young people were involved in important debates about the society and its problems in general.

International partners and funders of the organisation include Eurasia Foundation, Anglo-American University, BRICS international forum, Dialogue of Civilizations, Siemens, several international business schools, Embassy of Indonesia, University of Iceland, City of Reykjavík, Czech Centre, European Youth Press, and others.

Goals

The organisation stated the following goals: fostering collaboration between young people, promotion of intercultural dialogue as a means of social change, and helping young people to develop social leadership skills. They further stated that it is their mission to create a friendly environment for the collaboration of young people through various events and to provide possibilities for youth to get financial aid for ideas and projects.

== Activities ==
Since 2010 it has co-hosted a number of youth conferences in collaboration with different partners, including the World Public Forum, which was founded by Vladimir Yakunin.

As of 2015 the organisation has hosted and organised several Youth Global Forums, in a number of countries including Spain, Indonesia, United Arab Emirates, France, with the last one being hosted in Amsterdam and gathering 103 young attendees from 42 countries. The best pitched projects of social innovation were awarded Youth Time Idea grant.

In addition to its conferences Youth Time International Movement has organized annual 5-day summer schools, held in a different country each year since 2011, including editions being held in Czech Republic, Germany, Italy, Russia and Croatia with the past four editions taking place in various cities across China. Besides various seminars, attendees are taught various skills, like The 30 attendees between the ages of 18 and 35 are selected from a pool of applicants, mostly from non-Western countries, who have demonstrated their commitment to social causes and social change in their applications. The organization also funds the travel expenses and accommodation of selected journalists between the ages of 18 and 35 to attend and subsequently cover their summer schools and conferences.

Rhodes Youth Forum is the annual forum organised by Youth Time International Movement with the idea to bring together young leaders, and other parties to discuss various issues that the youth faces. It was held in the period of 2010–2014.

== Youth Time Magazine ==
Youth Time Magazine covers the stories of young people who are successful in their fields, articles on useful skillsets, notable universities, open calls for grants and competitions and volunteering opportunities. According to magazine editors, their main purpose is "to develop relevant content to help youth around the globe to direct their youth time towards social responsibility and service to the world."

Since the 2010 to 2016 the organization published a bi-monthly in English and Russian. The Magazine states that the printed version has a circulation of 28,000 with 65% of its subscribers based in Russia, 20% in Germany, and 15% in the Czech Republic.

According to Youth Time Magazine editors, since 2010 until 2016 the circulation has increased more than 16 times (from 1,500 to 26,200 copies) with the readership all over the world.

As of 2016, the magazine has been only published online in English.
