= Nana Adwoa Awindor =

Ghanaian television host

- Occupations: Film maker, TV celebrity
- Known for: Greetings from Abroad (television show)
- Children: Efya

Nana Adwoa Awindor is a Ghanaian television host and the Development Queenmother of Afigya-Kwabre district in the Ashanti Region of Ghana. In 2013, she was elected the First President of the Continental Executive Board of the African Queens and Women Cultural Leaders Network. She is a member of the Ghana National Union of Queenmothers (Women Traditional Leaders).

== Career ==
NanaHemaa Awindor is the host of First Ghanaian International Link television show Greetings From Abroad/Back Home Again, and the CEO of a production company, Premier Productions.

== Personal life ==
Awindor is a native of Adum Kwanwoma. She is the mother of singer Efya. Award Awindor was named CIMG Marketing Woman of the Year (2006).
