= Forum of Small States =

Coalition of developing countries

- Abbreviation: FOSS
- Formation: 1 October 1992; 34 years ago
- Founded at: New York, New York, United States
- Type: Informal grouping of nations at the UN
- Purpose: To provide a forum for small states to promote their economic interests
- Headquarters: United Nations Headquarters
- Fields: International politics
- Members: 108 member states
- Chair: Singapore
- Affiliations: United Nations

The Forum of Small States (FOSS) is a voluntary, informal and non-ideological grouping of countries at the United Nations, founded in 1992 by Singapore. Since then, Singapore has served as Chair of FOSS. The Forum of Small States is open to countries with a population of fewer than 10 million, although the population of some members has exceeded that level since they joined the group.

The term "small state" is similar to the term microstate or ministate, a sovereign state having a very small population or land area, usually both. However, the meanings of "state" and "very small" are not well-defined in international law.

The international system is for the most part made up by small powers or small states. While a small power in the international system may never equal or surpass the effect of larger powers, they can nevertheless influence the workings of the international system together with others.

According to a 2017 review study, "What scholars can agree on is that small states generally prefer multilateralism as both a path to influence and a means to restrain larger states. Studies of influential small states indicate that they are able to develop issue-specific power to make up for what they lack in aggregate structural power. Small states can, therefore, develop power disproportionate relative to their size on the few issues of utmost importance to them. In addition to prioritization, small states have successfully employed the strategies of coalition-building and image-building. Even though small state administrations lack the resources of their larger counterparts, their informality, flexibility, and the autonomy of their diplomats can prove advantageous in negotiations and within institutional settings."

Small states make up the majority of United Nations member states and they have served as key drafters, negotiators, and thought leaders on a variety of issues at the UN. However, small states face significant structural and capacity barriers to their effective participation in diplomacy and policymaking at the UN.

FOSS now comprises 108 countries across all geographical regions and at various levels of development and members meet several times a year to discuss issues of concern to small states.

== Founding ==
The Permanent Representative of Singapore to the UN, Chew Tai Soo, assumed his role in 1991 and said he was struck by three shortcomings which small member states of the UN faced:

First, small states particularly those which do not belong to a recognised grouping were often excluded from the inner sanctums of negotiations... Second, and related to the first, small countries often lacked in-depth information on what went on in the UN; unless they had a team of very active diplomats. Third, and most critically small states had by tradition been proportionally under-represented in the principal organs of the UN and boards of the UN specialised agencies. This came about because it was difficult for small states to be elected to these organs and agencies. I had observed at the 1991 Economic and Social Council (ECOSOC) elections that the big regional countries were easily elected at the first round of voting. The smaller countries were then left to fight over the remaining seats.

Following discussions, the core group that was convened by Singapore to form FOSS were:

FOSS Core Group
Bahrain
Barbados
Botswana
Djibouti
Cape Verde
Gabon
Honduras
Jamaica
Malta
Mongolia
Papua New Guinea
Singapore
Suriname
Tunisia
Uruguay
Vanuatu

== Challenges for small states ==
Small states face structural and capacity barriers to their participation in diplomacy and policymaking at the UN because their foreign ministries and missions are smaller than their larger counterparts, the relative costs of engagement are higher for small states and they often face capacity problems in filtering and processing the vast quantities of information they do receive.

The countries designated as small states include some of the most and least developed nations, resource-rich and resource-scarce countries, and both island and landlocked states. The diversity of small states is significant, in terms of their circumstances, interests, policy priorities, and resources. These significant differences limit the extent to which small states can cooperate on policy issues or come together as a single negotiating bloc. At the founding of FOSS, the initial criterion for defining a "small state" was defined as any country that had a population of less than 10 million people at the time of joining. As a result, there is a large discrepancy between members' geographical sizes, which are not taken into account. The largest member by geographical area is Libya at 1,759,540 square kilometres (679,362 square miles), ranked 16th in the world. Some member states' populations have exceeded 10 million since they joined the group; the largest member by population is Zambia with an estimated 19,610,769 people, ranked 64th in the world.

In 2012, at the 20th anniversary of the formation of FOSS, then UN Secretary-General Ban Ki-moon noted some of the reasons the group was formed:

Small developing States face special challenges. Landlocked developing countries find themselves marginalized from the world economy, cut-off from global flows of knowledge, technology, capital and innovations, and unable to benefit substantially from external trade. The small island developing States continue to be on the frontlines in dealing with the adverse effects of climate change and sea level rise. From telecommunications and electricity to education and health, many of the problems faced by the small island developing States, located deep in the middle of oceans, are similar to the transportation challenges faced by the landlocked countries of the Himalayas.

In 2019 in his remarks to the Small States Forum, UN Secretary-General António Guterres noted that small states are especially vulnerable to climate change and should not be expected to pay for climate disasters alone:

Over the past 20 years, more than 90 percent of disasters - droughts, floods, hurricanes and fires - were climate-related. Economic losses alone are estimated at more than $2.2 trillion and the human toll falls largely on low-income countries. These disasters constitute a major impediment to sustainable development.

For small states, recovery and reconstruction bills, including the cost of restoring people’s livelihoods, can total more than 100 per cent of Gross Domestic Product. Successive storms can trap small island states in particular in an accelerating cycle of disaster and debt...

Many small states, including middle-income countries, are highly vulnerable to external shocks of all kinds. As a result, the debt levels of small states are on average higher than other developing countries. Many are currently under debt distress or face a high risk of debt distress.

But small states also have certain advantages, as noted by Singapore Prime Minister Lee Hsien Loong:

We can respond more nimbly and adapt more easily to changing circumstances. Our sense of insecurity and even paranoia are also constructive as they motivate us to deal more decisively with challenges and threats. With our options more constrained, our collective minds are more readily focussed, and we are less hampered by regional interests and differences, or multiple levels of government, that bigger countries have to grapple with.

In 2022, on the 30th anniversary of the formation of FOSS, Singapore's Infocomm Media Development Authority worked with the Ministry of Foreign Affairs to create Digital FOSS, a branch of FOSS that provides a platform for small states to collaborate on digital transformation and share common learning points.

== Activities ==
In 2022, “FOSS for Good” was launched, a technical assistance package to provide a peer-learning platform for FOSS members to share experiences, best practices, and solutions to tackle common challenges.

In January 2024, PassBlue, a New York City-based nonprofit that observes and independently reports on activities at and involving the UN, launched a series on multi-lateralism and small states. Articles focused on the challenges to small states in general, as well as profiles of specific challenges for Armenia and Gambia.

Singapore hosted a study visit by 12 Permanent Representatives to the UN in New York from 19 to 23 February 2024 under the 12th FOSS Fellowship Programme. These Permanent Representatives were from Botswana, Burundi, Cabo Verde, Fiji, Grenada, Kyrgyzstan, Lesotho, Micronesia, Nauru, Senegal, Suriname and Tuvalu.

== Current members ==
Members
Albania	Liberia
Andorra	Libya
Antigua & Barbuda	Liechtenstein
Armenia	Lithuania
Austria	Luxembourg
Azerbaijan	Maldives
Bahamas	Malta
Bahrain	Marshall Islands
Barbados	Mauritania
Belarus	Mauritius
Belize	Micronesia
Benin	Moldova
Bhutan	Monaco
Bolivia	Mongolia
Bosnia and Herzegovina	Montenegro
Botswana	Namibia
Brunei	Nauru
Bulgaria	New Zealand
Burundi	Nicaragua
Cabo Verde	North Macedonia
Cambodia	Norway
Central African Republic	Oman
Comoros	Palau
Costa Rica	Panama
Croatia	Papua New Guinea
Cyprus	Paraguay
Czech Republic	Qatar
Denmark	Rwanda
Djibouti	Saint Kitts and Nevis
Dominican Republic	Saint Lucia
El Salvador	Saint Vincent and the Grenadines
Estonia	Samoa
Eswatini	San Marino
Fiji	Senegal
Finland	Serbia
Gabon	Seychelles
Gambia	Sierra Leone
Georgia	Singapore
Grenada	Slovakia
Guinea-Bissau	Slovenia
Guyana	Solomon Islands
Haiti	Suriname
Honduras	Sweden
Hungary	Switzerland
Iceland	Tajikistan
Ireland	Timor-Leste
Jamaica	Togo
Jordan	Tonga
Kuwait	Trinidad & Tobago
Kyrgyzstan	Tunisia
Lao PDR	United Arab Emirates
Latvia	Uruguay
Lebanon	Vanuatu
Lesotho	Zambia

== See also ==
- ASEAN
- Group of 77
- Least developed countries
- Pacific Islands Forum
- Small Island Developing States
- Southeast Asia Treaty Organisation
