= Dr. Paa Bobo =

Ghanaian highlife musician

Kwaku Agyapong Danemah
- Also known as: Dr. Paa Bobo
- Born: September 11, 1951; Akyim Maase
- Origin: Eastern Region, Ghana
- Died: December 28, 2013 (aged 62) Korle Bu Teaching Hospital
- Genres: Highlife

Kwaku Agyapong Danemah popularly known as Dr. Paa Bobo (11 September 1951 – 28 December 2013) was a Ghanaian highlife musician, known as highlife music legend. He is also known for the popular and nationwide hit song Osobro kyee. In January 2020, Stonebwoy with his Bhim Band remixed Osobro kyee titled Sobolo.

The late Dr. Paa Bobo is noted to have travelled to Nigeria, during which he recorded a couple of his songs.

== Early life and education ==
Dr. Paa Bobo was born to a family of music enthusiasts. His father was a member of a local band, and he encouraged his son to pursue music. Dr. Paa Bobo attended Kumasi Technical Institute, where he studied Electrical Engineering.

== Musical career ==
Dr. Paa Bobo started his musical career in the 1970s, as a member of the Kumasi-based group, 'Gye Nyame', which included other prominent highlife musicians like Kojo Antwi and George Darko. He later formed his own band, 'Sweet Talks', and released his debut album, 'Onyame Nkrabea', in 1982. The album was a huge success, and it established him as one of the leading highlife musicians in Ghana.

Over the next decade, Dr. Paa Bobo released several hit albums, including 'Obiara Se Eye Aduro', 'Me Ye Obaa', and 'Comfort'. He also collaborated with other Ghanaian musicians, such as Amakye Dede, Nana Acheampong, and Charles Amoah. Dr. Paa Bobo's music was popular not only in Ghana but also in other African countries and among the African diaspora in Europe and North America.

In addition to his musical career, Dr. Paa Bobo was also involved in philanthropic activities. He established the 'Paa Bobo Foundation', which provided educational and medical assistance to underprivileged children in Ghana.

== Personal life and legacy ==
Dr. Paa Bobo was married and had several children. He was a devout Christian and often incorporated Christian themes into his music. He died on September 28, 2013, after a brief illness.
