= Kwaisey Pee =

- Born: Akwasi Poku Addae
- Citizenship: Ghanaian
- Education: Datus School Complex
- Occupation: musician

Akwasi Poku Addae, better known by the stage name Kwaisey Pee, is a Ghanaian highlife musician. He is mostly known for his soothing voice, and has five albums to his credit. In 2007, he won the Best Male Vocal performance of the Ghana Music Awards.

== Early life ==
Kwaisey Pee was born into a music family. His father is Agyaaku of Yamoah and Sunsum Mystics Band. He is a cousin to Rex Omar and a brother of rapper Criss Waddle. He was schooled at Datus School Complex, Tema but soon diverted to pursue his musical dreams.

== Music career ==
He started his music career with his father's band and later left to join the Sikadwa Band of Nana Tuffour in 1994. He further moved to join Jewel Ackah and the Beautiful Six Band, then on to London with his father where an album titled Nyame Ye Odo was released in 1998. He has released five albums, including Krokro Me, Akono Yaa, and Nyane Me, a 13-track album which featured Tic Tac, Kontihene, K K Fosu, Ofori Amponsah and his father, Agyeiku.

He was off the music scene for a while but came back to release Mabre with Yaa Yaa in December 2018.

== Discography ==
=== Albums ===
- Nyame Ye Odo
- Mabre
- Krokro Me
- Akono Yaa
- Nyane Me
