= Small power =

Term for a class of states

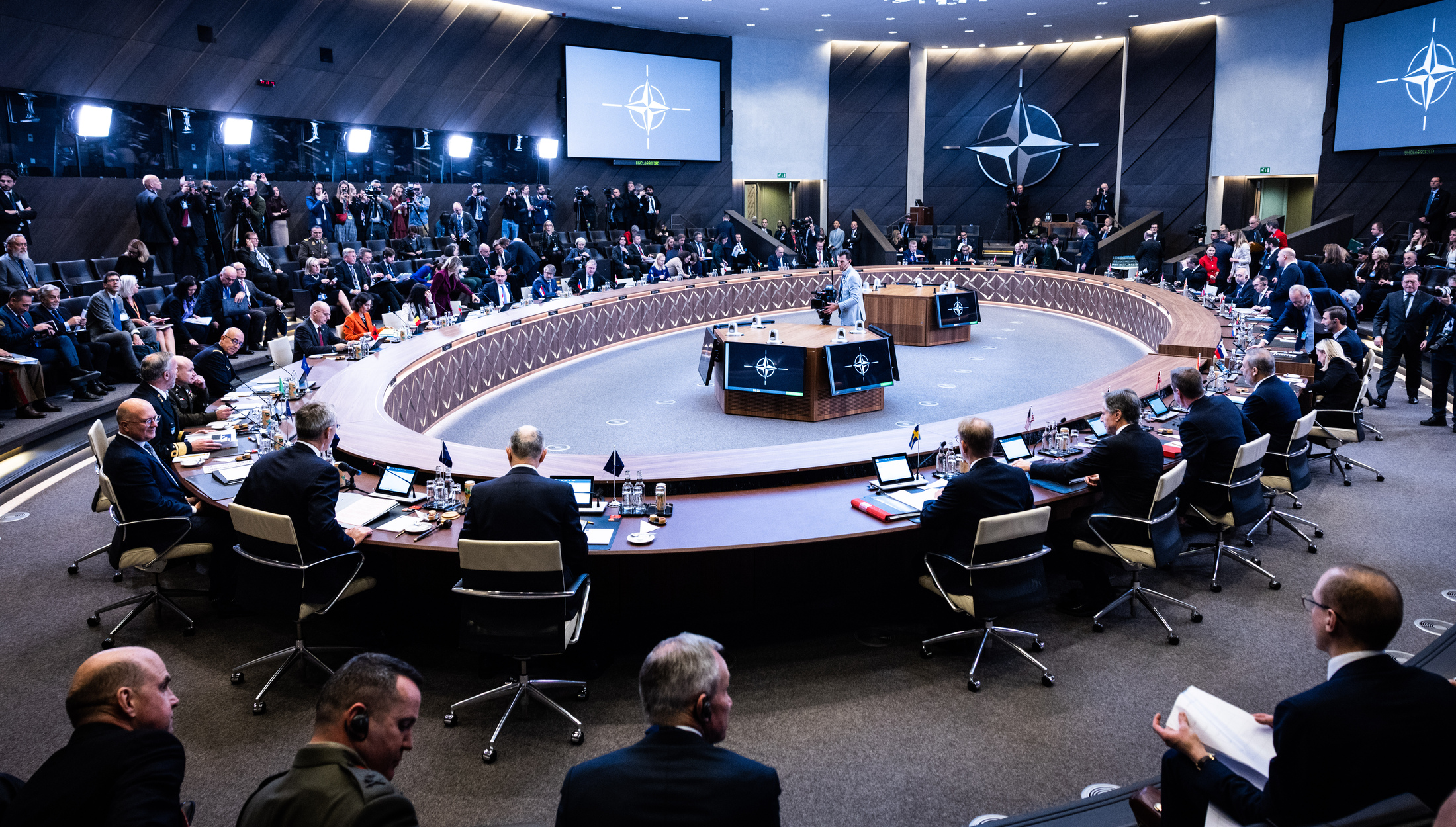
Military alliances like NATO combine small and major powers to ensure international security and collective policymaking.

A small power is a state that exerts significant influence in regional international relations but does not impact global affairs as a middle power, great power, or superpower would. A small power typically projects power within its immediate proximity due to relative military, economic, or political strength. Similar to a regional power, these states maintain a limited sphere of influence, typically extending to its bordering neighbor states. These states use international organizations and form alliances to concentrate collective power to achieve foreign policy objectives.

The majority of sovereign states cannot exert influence beyond their borders and rely on small or regional powers to advance common efforts. Prior to the signing of the Treaty of Chaumont in 1814, it was assumed that all sovereign states held equal power in a functioning international system. These states often develop "issue-specific power" and leverage relative strength over weaker states within institutional settings. They seek power maximization through international organizations.

== Definition ==
There is no widely agreed upon definition of what constitutes a small power. These states combine soft and hard power internationally with smaller populations, smaller territories by area, smaller economies, and limited military capability.

There is ambiguity around how populous states should be to be defined as small or middle powers. Although states with less than 10 or 15 million inhabitants are regarded as small by most academics, states with up to 30 million inhabitants are sometimes considered small. Due to the complexity of defining "smallness" in terms of a state, multiple competing definitions have been presented. These definitions consider multiple factors such as the criteria laid out by political scientist Raimo Väyrynen in 1971:

One axis considers whether the factors involved are endogenous or exogenous: that is to say, whether the smallness lies in the internal aspects of a country itself (such as its population or [economic output]) or in its relations with other states (such as the size of its armed forces or its alliance status). The other axis involves objective and subjective evaluations: that is, whether the smallness is seen in terms of ‘measureable’ elements (such as geographical area or size of the diplomatic corps) or ‘impressionistic’ elements (notably views held and/or expressed by practitioners and commentators either at home or abroad).

Where the small states are located geographically impacts their inclusion as a small power. Similarly populated or large countries in Europe, Latin America, or Africa may hold widely different power within the international community despite their technical commonalities. The country's economic output, the ranking of a state in the international system, the political, economical and military power play an important role in putting a state somewhere on the spectrum.

Throughout early research, various definitions were advanced by scholars such as David Vital, Robert Rothstein, Maurice East, and Robert Keohane.

== Characteristics ==
Many small power states embody certain characteristics and behavioural patterns in their effort to preserve and advance their interests. Foreign policy scholar Asle Toje found recurring traits in his research literature on the international stage:

1. The strategic behaviour of small powers is characterized by dependence. Small powers tend towards a policy of either strict neutrality or alliance. Those ‘located in geopolitical regions critical to maintaining a great power's position in the international system [tend] to opt for alliance'. Under regional hegemony with a low probability of punishment, small powers tend to adopt neutrality.
2. Small powers display variable geometry. They identify a hierarchy of risks and attempt to internationalize those considered to be most serious. Small power policies, argues political scientist David Vital, are aimed at altering the external environment by ‘reducing an unfavourable discrepancy in strength, broadening the field of manoeuvre and choice, and increasing the total resources on which the state can count in times of stress’.
3. Small powers are the primary beneficiaries of international institutions and are, by necessity, followers of the law. Generally, this leads to a high degree of participation in and support for international organizations, which leads to a tendency to adopt ‘moral’ or ‘normative’ policy positions.
4. Small powers are risk averse. They see more dangers than opportunities in international politics, which leads them both to shun system-upholding tasks and to display a penchant for token participation in such endeavours. Annette Baker Fox sees small powers as being geographically bound in the sense that their demands are restricted to their own and immediately adjacent areas, while great powers exert their influence on a global scale.

== Foreign policy ==
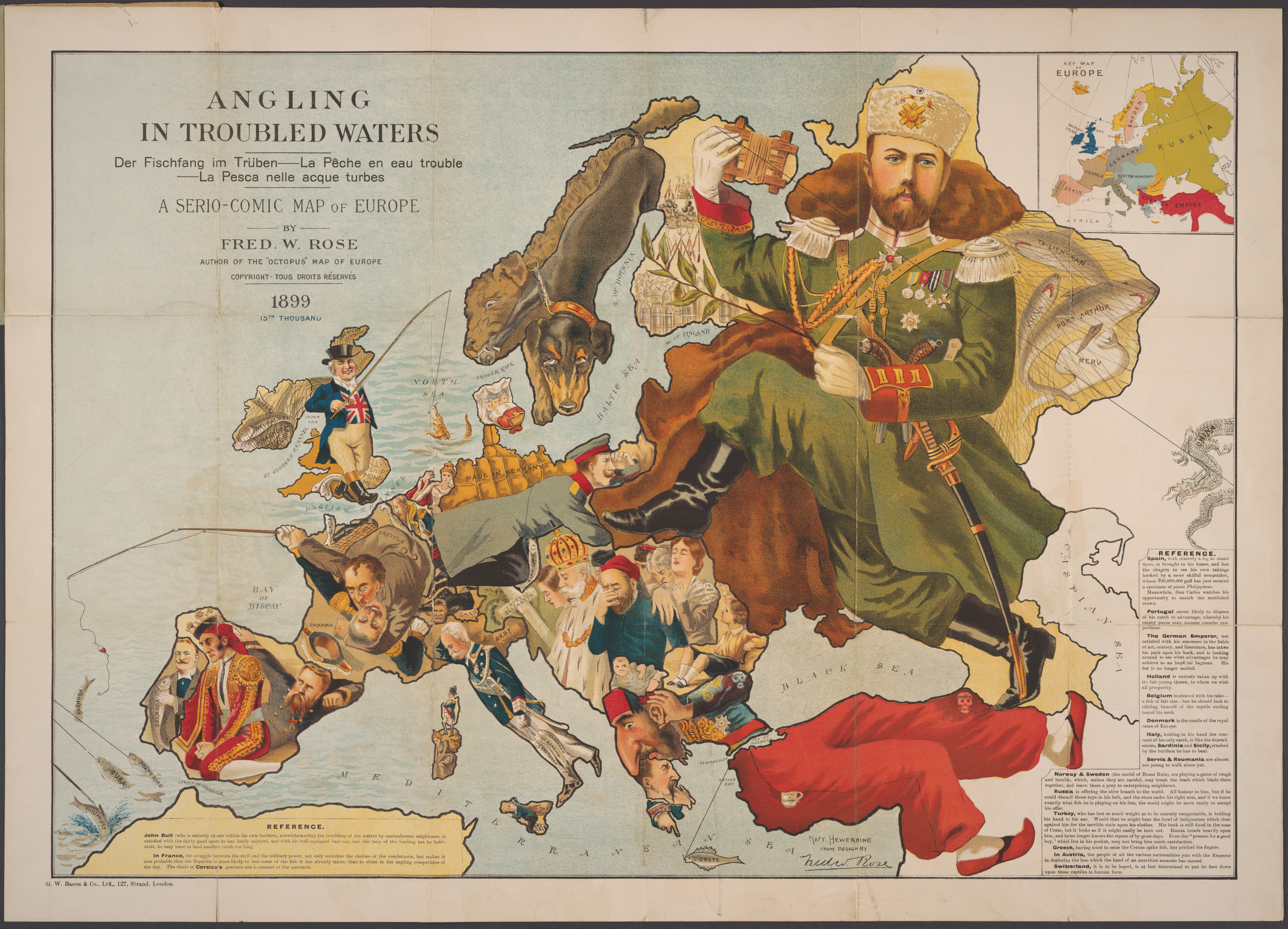
A map of Europe in 1899, highlighting regional balance of power.

In terms of foreign policy, small power states are usually more vulnerable to changes in the international system since they are more focused on survival than the bigger states. The costs of being exploited are higher for small states and the effects of foreign-policy mistakes are much bigger, since the bigger states have a larger margin of time and error. International theorists tend to believe that the foreign policy of small states is more greatly influenced by the international system rather than their domestic politics.

International relations theorists Alyson Bailes, Bradley Thayer, and Baldur Thorhallsson make the argument that small states differ from larger states in how they form alliances. They advance the "alliance of shelter" theory, which concludes that these states seek:

- Political shelter in the form of the "norms and rules of the international system" as a protective layer without hard military or diplomatic power
- Economic shelter means having economic assistance, access to a common market and even beneficial loans amongst other factors, and it can be from an organisation or another state.
- Societal shelter is about identity and being recognised by others due to the "risk cultural, educational and technological stagnation without the free flow of people, goods and ideas."

In Europe, particularity within the European Union, there are various effective and inexpensive shelters available for small states.

== Power maximization ==
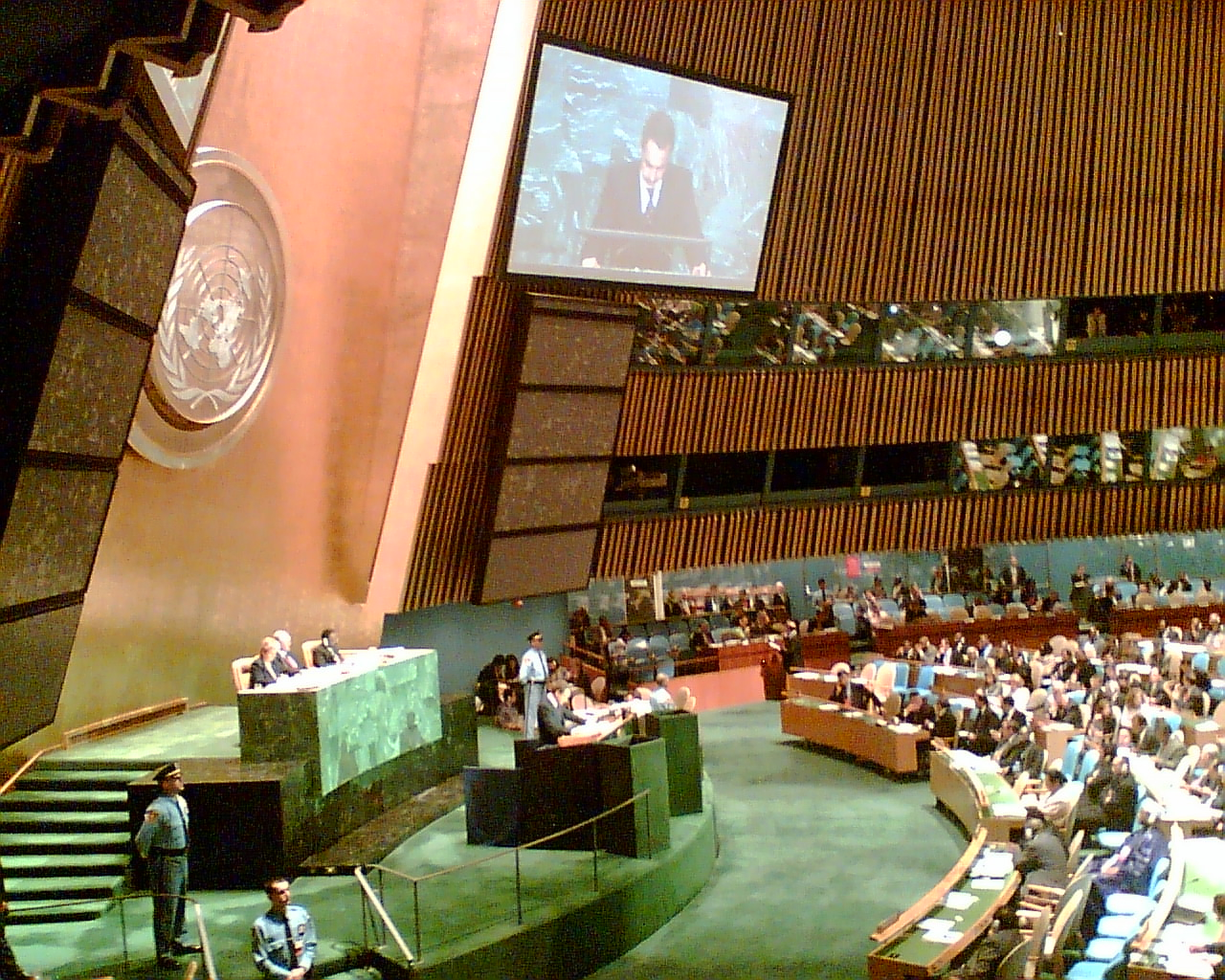
The United Nations allows small powers to maximize their influence while the UN Security Council favors great powers.

Smaller power states seek power maximization through international organizations and cooperation. A traditional, realist view of small states is that they are disadvantaged within the international system. A Liberal Institutionalist view emphasizes the institutionalization of the international system through international cooperation.

When decisions are taken according to a one-state, one-vote, majority voting procedure – such as the WTO and the UN – small states are at the advantage. When decisions are taken according to a weighted voting system – such as the EU – small states are disproportionately weakened. Within these settings, small states can increase their power through strategic priorities, chairing meetings, agenda setting, and collective persuasion strategies. International institutions can decrease the price of cooperation, facilitate information sharing and provide a venue for relationship building.

These types of countries are able to maintain unique power dynamics:

- Norm entrepreneurship - develop and promote ‘new’ ideas such as equality and sustainable development
- Issue specific power - e.g. fisheries, oil production
- Diplomats are more flexible, autonomous, and directly influential in domestic government.
- Less bureaucratic and therefore potentially faster acting.
- More focused interests and therefore able to form coalitions and trade votes.

== International organizations ==
The European Union combines many small states into a supranational union.

Small states may have a disproportionately great influence within international organizations. According to Diana Panke, "Small states tend to be most likely to punch above their weight if the negotiations take place in an institutionalised arena with majority-based decision-making rules in which each state has one vote or in contexts in which decisions are made unanimously, if they are selective in negotiations and concentrate their capacities on the most important issues, engage in capacity-building activities to maximise their ideational resources, if they make use of institutional opportunity structures such as chairing meetings and engaging in agenda-setting, and if they individually or collectively apply persuasion strategies from early on".

A size-related obstacle would for example be the EU which uses a system of weighted voting, which gives bigger states a greater political leverage than smaller states. Many international organisations use a "one state, one vote" principle which may appear to secure equality between states of various sizes. Delegates from smaller states tend to have speaking points for fewer issues and smaller budgets than the delegates from the larger nations; this gives the larger states a better position to influence outcomes both in weighted and equal weight voting systems. Small states can engage in capacity-building, for example through contacts with or through joining coalitions.

The location of a small power is important for its survival. If a small power is working as a "buffer state" between two bigger rival power then it is more likely for that state to cease to exist. Despite the fact that the buffer location can decrease the likelihood of a small powers survival does not mean that a state cannot use its buffer location as an advantage through strategic leverage.

== Power dynamics ==
These types of states are seek their needs and interests through particular-intrinsic, derivative and collective power:

Particular-intrinsic power

Particular-intrinsic assets can serve as the base of small states' power but the resources will only gain importance through the states actions. For example, small states may rely on their strategic location or material possessions. Identity can also be a potential base for the exercise of power.

Derivative power

Small states that lack material capabilities can try to persuade larger states to take actions that will increase their interests and thus derive power. The means of this power will depend on the small states’ goals and the type of relationship it has with the larger state. In a friendly relationship, there can be the possibility for an access to policy discourses.

Collective power

The base of collective power is the relationship a small state has to other small states. This type of power can be achieved through single-issue groupings, institutionalism or by leveraging allies in pursuance of one state's cause. Institutions can provide small states with protection the ability for small states to influence rules and be used to broaden norms in the international field.

== Status seeking ==
International status seeking is common with smaller powers in efforts maximize respective influence. Smaller states' status aim is often to stand out among peer groups of similar states and position themselves as useful allies to great powers. States can be a major donor in the United Nations and give competitive status among peer groups of small states while simultaneously acknowledge great powers for system maintenance. Small states may opt for a collective strategy of mobility into the middle power rank by taking on extended responsibilities for preserving international order.

== List of small powers ==
As with the great or middle powers, there is no unanimous agreement among authorities as to which countries are definitively considered small powers. The following countries have been considered small powers:

- Albania
- Angola
- Armenia
- Bosnia and Herzegovina
- Bulgaria
- Costa Rica
- Croatia
- Cyprus
- Estonia
- Latvia
- Lithuania
- North Macedonia
- Serbia

== Nordic states' behavior ==
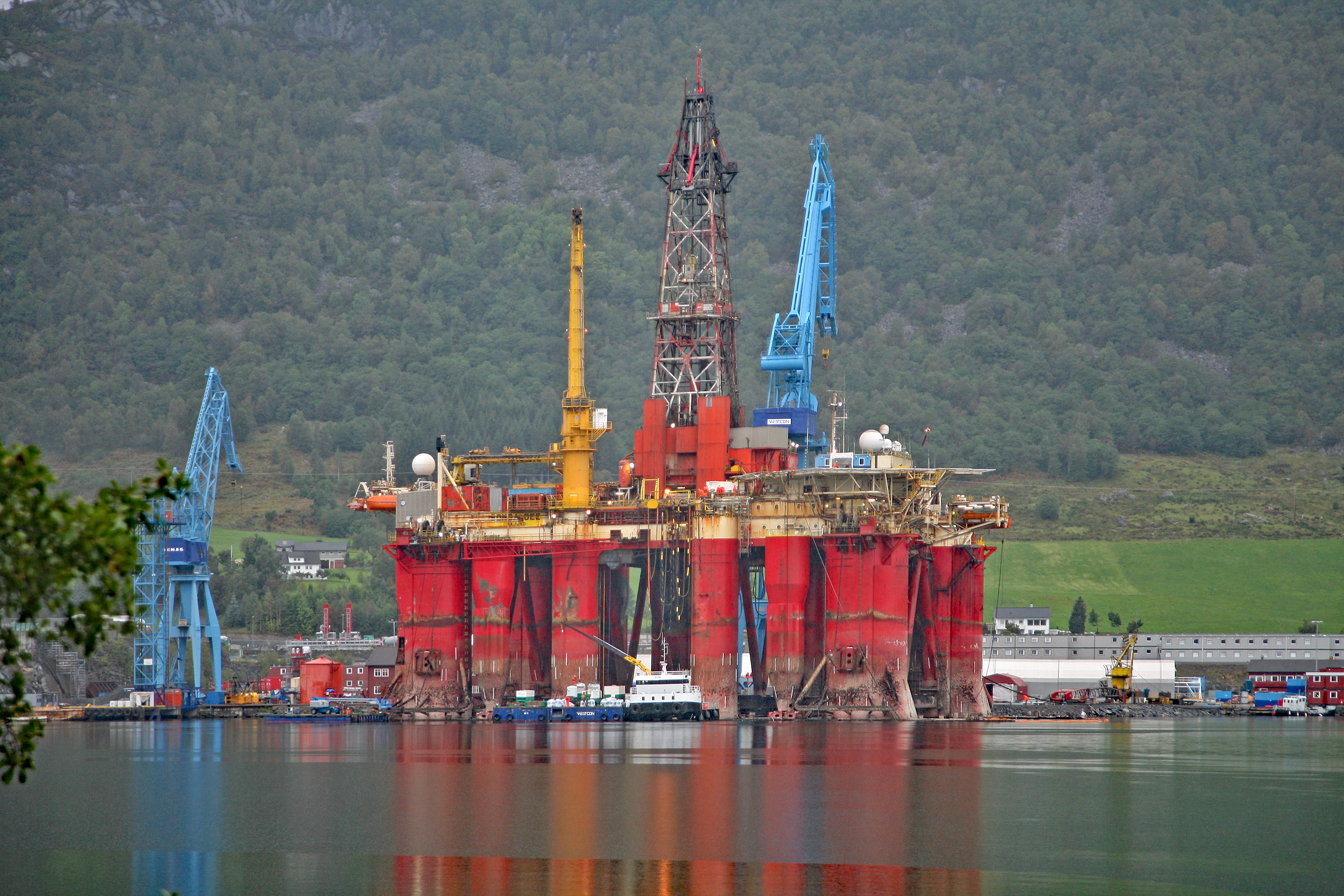
Norway, a small state, considered a middle power, uses its oil reserves to project intrinsic power.

The Nordic states of Denmark, Sweden and Finland have exhibited small power characteristics in the European Union while the remaining others, Iceland and Norway, do not. These five Nordic states have differences that are important to their industrial structures as Lars Mjoset, a Norwegian political economist, pointed out. Ingebritsen noted that: Each Nordic government had to respond to a different set of interest groups – some that anticipated positive benefits of European integration and others that anticipated undesirable costs. One of the major differences is how dependant these nations are on their raw materials and manufacturing production.

== See also ==
- Balance of power
- Emerging power
- Power (international relations)
- Regional power
- Superpower
- The Forum of Small States
