= Kwame Yeboah (musician) =

Ghanaian musician and guitarist

- Born: 17 November 1977 (age 48); Wassa, Ghana
- Occupations: Musician, producer, recording engineer, instrumentalist

Kwame Yeboah (born 17 November 1977) is a Ghanaian musician, guitarist, keyboardist, producer, recording engineer and multi-instrumentalist. Originally from a village in Western Ghana, his love for music led him around the world working with international artists and back to his home country where he operated his recording studio, Mixstation until early 2017. In 2023, he was named to be a member of the Recording Academy of the Grammy Awards.

== Early life ==
His father A.K. Yeboah was a veteran highlife musician. Kwame grew up in a house with his many half siblings and his father's musician friends, surrounded by music, playing drums by age 5 and guitar by age 7, soon moving on to keyboards. At age 18, Kwame left his then girlfriend and young daughter behind to move to Denmark and study music (Arrangement and Harmony) and took up workshops with jazz artists and music tutors such as Michel Camilo and Danilo Pérez. He also fathered a son with an aspiring Danish singer.

== Career ==
Yeboah relocated to the UK after being invited to work with British singer and rapper Ms. Dynamite, which was followed by many TV appearances and live shows. Now based in London, he moved on to working with many British artists such as MPHO, Daniel Bedingfield, Jamie Scott, Rhian Benson, Mis-Teeq, and Craig David who he accompanied on David's 2013 world tour.

Having toured and worked with artists such as Stevie Wonder, Omar, Shaggy, Another Level, Ken Boothe, Tom Jones and many more, Kwame is currently a member of the Supowers working and touring with Sierra Leonean-German reggae/soul artist Patrice Bart-Williams as well as Yusuf/Cat Stevens's Roadsters.

Despite not being in the same country for more than a month going from his home in London to stages all over the world, Kwame is continuously active in his home country Ghana and the Ghanaian music business. He has been known as the keyboardist and music director for Ghanaian musician Kojo Antwi. He is also a part of the Ghanaian Afro-pop band Osibisa.

Kwame operates his Mixstation studio out of Accra, Ghana producing and promoting African artists such as Wunmi, Becca, Nana Yaa and Efya. As a musical director, he was responsible for shows like Vodafone Icons Reality Show and Red Lipsticks Concert. His Ohia b3y3 ya Band, also known as OBY, released their first single "Only You" in 2013.

In 2014, he started the sega/reggae fusion band the sYnergee with fellow musicians and friends Eric Appapoulay (vocals and guitar), Joshua McKenzie a.k.a. MckNasty (drums), Rick Leon James (bass), Marcina Arnold, and Karlos Edwards (both on percussion).

Kwame recently "revived" Ghanaian highlife singer Pat Thomas and brought him along with his Kwashibu Area Band to stages around Europe while still touring with Craig David and Cat Stevens as their musical director.

== Awards and nominations ==
Yeboah won the 2010 Ghana Music Award for Best Instrumentalist.

In May 2021, he was awarded as Instrumentalist of the Year at the International Reggae and World Music Awards (IRAWMA).
