= Eurasia Foundation =

Eurasia Foundation from Asia (from Asia)
- Abbreviation: EF-A
- Formation: 21 December 2009; 16 years ago
- Type: Non-profit Organization
- Purpose: To contribute to the elimination of all conflicts in the world and the creation of a harmonious and peaceful society for everyone on earth.
- Headquarters: 405 Station Plaza Tower, Tokyo, Japan
- Chairman: Yoji Sato
- Key people: Joon Kong Chung, Hidekazu Nishizuka & Chiaki Merritt
- Website: eurasia.or.jp
- Formerly called: One Asia Foundation

Eurasia Foundation (from Asia) (一般財団法人 ユーラシア財団, Ippan zaidanhōjin yūrashia zaidan) (EF), formerly known as One Asia Foundation (OAF), is a non-profit organization founded in December 2009. Its headquarters are in Tokyo.

The organization's stated aim is increased international cooperation, with the goal of creating an international community of over 40 countries in Northeast Asia, Southeast Asia and Central Asia. It offers grants to universities and other institutions of higher educations that teach courses within areas such as regional integration.

== Conventions ==
Eurasia Foundation hosts annual conventions and invites special guests as keynote speakers annually since 2011.

Eurasia Foundation Conventions
Year	Location	Notable Participants / Keynote Speakers	Topics / Theme
2011	Hotel Lungwood, Tokyo, Japan	Kang Sang-Jung (professor, University of Tokyo) Eiichi Shindo (representative of International Academic Society for Asian Community)	"Toward the formation of Asian Community"
2012	Hyatt Regency, Incheon, South Korea	Hak-Su Kim (former Executive Secretary of UN ESCAP)	"Towards the Asian Community"
2013	The Museum of Asian-African Conference The Savoy Homann Bidakara Hotel, Bandung, Indonesia	Jusuf Kalla (former Vice President of Indonesia) Sunaryo Kartadinata (Rector or UPI)	"Enhancing Asian Competitiveness" "Developing Education for Better Asia"
2014	Jeju Grand Hotel, Jeju, South Korea	Richard Dasher (professor, Stanford University) Yoji Sato (chairman, Eurasia Foundation)	Politics and Economics History, Education and Social Matters Culture, Media and Arts
2015	WH Ming Hotel, Shangai, China	Yoji Sato (chairman, Eurasia Foundation) Sha Zukang (former head of the United Nations Department of Economic and Social Affairs)	Politics and Economics History, Education and Social Matters Culture, Media and Arts
2016	InterContinental, Phnom Penh, Cambodia	Yoji Sato (chairman, Eurasia Foundation) Anthony Jackson (vice president of Asia Society, USA)	Present and Future Prospects of Education
2017	Nagoya Kanko Hotel, Nagoya, Japan	Yoichi Komori (professor of the University of Tokyo)	"Various issues surrounding Peace"
2018	Lotte Hotel, Hanoi, Vietnam	Al Gore (former Vice President of USA)	"The Climate Crisis and its Solutions" "Hope for the Future"
2019	Lotte Hotel, Seoul, South Korea	Ki-moon Ban (former Secretary-General of the United Nations)	"Education and Peace"

== Other collaborations ==
The foundation collaborates with the Studies on Intermediality and Intercultural Mediation research group at the Complutense University of Madrid.

In 2016, the foundation awarded Dr Kevin Cawley of University College Cork $50,000 to open a course on Asian studies.

In February 2019, the foundation visited Amity University Haryana, where a 3 credit certificate course on One-Asian Community Theory was opened over a 14 week period for 45 students.

February 2020, The Center for Korean Studies at the University of Washington announced they were going to host a lecture series with the foundation's chairman giving a lecture titled, "The World Will Be United in the Near Future" starting on 16 April 2020. However, due to the pandemic, the lecture was cancelled.

== Foundation Name Change ==
In April 2020, the foundation officially changed their name to Eurasia Foundation (from Asia) after the expansion of activities in Europe and the Middle East with the vision to develop their activities globally.
