= Blackmagic (musician) =

Nigerian rapper, singer and songwriter

- Born: Efemena Mukoro; April 21; Delta State, Nigeria
- Genres: Afropop; Afrobeat; Rhythm and Blues; Soul
- Occupation: Musician
- Years active: 2010–present

Efemena Mukoro, professionally known as Blackmagic, is a Nigerian rapper, singer and songwriter. He is known for his unique musical style and is considered a pioneer of the Nigerian alternative scene.

== Early life and education ==
Mukoro is a native of Delta State but was born and raised in Lagos. He attended King's College, Lagos for his secondary education and studied computer science from the University of Benin.

== Career ==
Mukoro dropped out of school to pursue his music career and started out under the stage name, Ejay. He was signed to Lynxxx's Syndik8 records in 2010 as a Soul and Afrobeat musician. He went on to release multiple singles and his debut album titled Blackmagic 1.0 in 2011; he gained popularity with his single titled Confam, which featured Sasha P.

He was briefly part of the Three Wise Men band under Syndik8 records, alongside 'Ikon' and 'Third Wiseman'. The group released the single Bastard in 2012. On leaving Syndik8 records, he achieved further success with his single, Repete in 2013. Repete is described as one of the Nigerian songs with the most critical acclaim.

Mukoro changed his stage name over time to "Ejay Blackmagic" and to simply "Blackmagic" upon his exit from Syndik8 records. He went on to launch his own record label, Based on Belief in 2013.

== Discography ==
=== Singles ===
- Tomorrow (2010)
- Rainbow (2011)
- Fantasy (2012)
- Repete (2012)
- Foreigner featuring Saeon
- Black Friday featuring Kid Konnect (2015)
- Wonder featuring Fetty Wap (2016)
- No need (2018)
- Anything for Love (2019)

=== With Three Wise Men ===
- Bastard (2012)

=== EPs ===
- BM (2019 )

=== Albums ===
- Version 1.0 (2011)
- Version 2.0 (2013)
- Black Friday (2015)
- Version 3.0 (2020)

== Awards and nominations ==
Year	Award	Category	Nominee	Result	Ref
2013	The Headies	Best Alternative Song	"Repete"	Won	
