= Sarkodie discography =

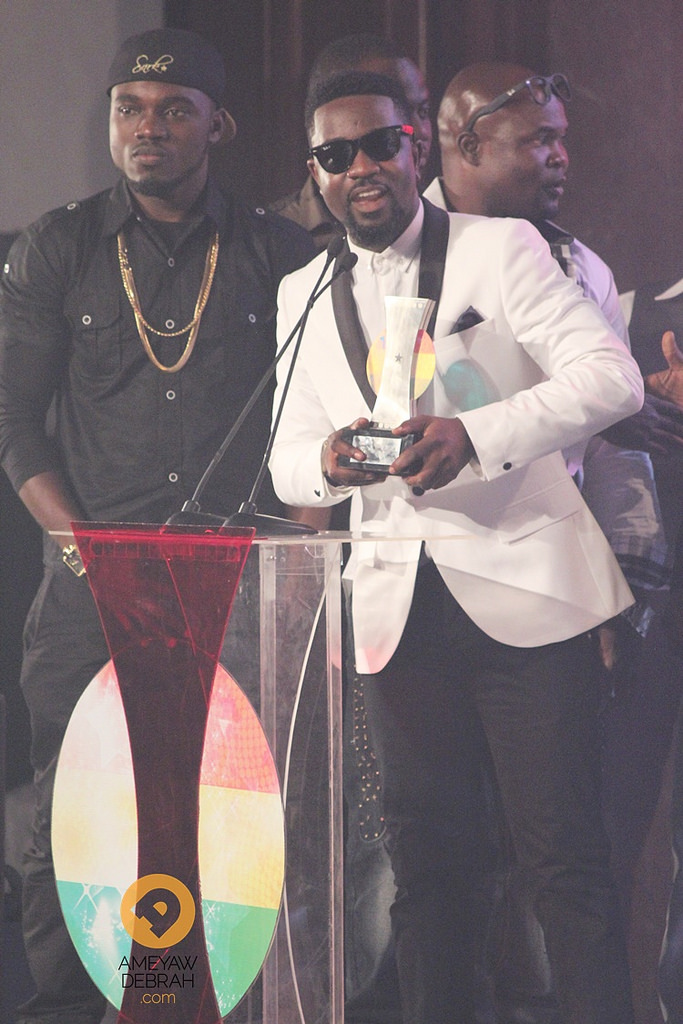
- Studio albums: 6
- Live albums: 1
- Singles: 31
- Music videos: 27
- Mixtapes: 18

Ghanaian rapper Sarkodie has released seven studio albums, one collaborative album and one live album.

== Discography ==
=== Studio albums ===
Title	Album details
Maakye	Released: 2009; Label: Duncwills Entertainment; Formats: CD, digital download
Rapperholic	Released: 16 February 2012; Label: Duncwills Entertainment/Konvict Muzik; Formats: CD, digital download
Sarkology	Released: January 2, 2014; Label: Duncwills Entertainment; Formats: CD, digital download
Highest	Released: September 8, 2017; Label: Sarkcess Music; Formats: CD, digital download
Black Love	Released: December 20, 2019; Label: Sarkcess Music; Formats: digital download
No Pressure	Released: June 30, 2021; Label: Sarkcess Music; Formats: digital download
Jamz	Released: 11 November 2022; Label: Sarkcess Music; Formats: digital download

=== Live albums ===
Title	Album details
Mary	Released: September 12, 2015; Label: Sarkcess Music; Formats: CD, digital download

== Music videos ==
Title	Year	Artist
You dey Craze	2008	Edem (featuring Kwaw Kese & Sarkodie)
Bra be hwe	2009	Sarkodie (Guru & Nii)
Baby	2009	Sarkodie (featuring Mugeez)
Borga	2010	Sarkodie
Lay away	2010	Sarkodie (featuring Sway & Jayso)
I like you Girl	2010	Scientific (featuring Sarkodie & EL)
Gunshot	2012	Sarkodie (featuring Davido)
Devio	2012	Sarkodie (featuring Kemenya)
Azonto Fiesta	2012	Sarkodie (featuring Appietus & Kesse)
6 Feet (Freestyle)	2013	Sarkodie
Pon di ting	2013	Sarkodie (featuring Banky W)
Lies	2013	Sarkodie (featuring Lil Shaker)
Original	2013	Sarkodie
Illuminati	2013	Sarkodie
Bounce	2013	Sarkodie
Down On One	2013	Sarkodie (featuring Fuse ODG)
Tonga	2013	Joey B (featuring Sarkodie)
Special Someone	2014	Sarkodie (featuring Burna Boy & A.K.A)
Preach	2014	Sarkodie
Love Rocks	2014	Sarkodie (featuring Samini)
Shots on Shots	2014	Sarkodie & Ice Prince
Adonai	2014	Sarkodie (featuring Castro)
Whine Fi me	2014	Sarkodie (featuring Jupitar and Stonebwoy)
Revenge of the Spartans	2015	Sarkodie
Tonight	2015	Jadiluc (featuring Sarkodie)
Oluwa is involve	2015	Sarkodie & Paedae (R2Beez)
Enemies	2015	Jupitar (featuring Sarkodie)
Take it back	2016	Sarkodie
Confirm	2016	Medikal (featuring Sarkodie)
Hello	2016	Sarkodie & Akwaboah
Trumphet	2016	Sarkodie (featuring TeePhlow, Medikal, Strongman, Koo Ntakra, Donzy & Pappy Kojo)
Biibi Ba	2018	Sarkodie (featuring Lyrical Joe, Tulenkey, Frequency, ToyBoi, Amerado, Kofi Mole, Yeyo, O’Bkay, CJ Biggerman & 2Fyngerz)

== Videography ==
Year	Title	Director	Ref
2018	Biibi Ba	Babs Direction	
2017	Pain Killer	Gyo Gyimah	
2017	Ur Waist	Alexx A	
2017	Glory	Ikone Agency	
2017	We No Dey Fear	Alexx A	
2016	Bossy	Julius Twum	
2015	SarkNation	—N/a	
2016	Bra	Nana Asihene	
2016	Hand To Mouth	IKONE Agency	
2015	Cash Only	—N/a	
2015	New Guy	Justin Campos	
2015	Revenge Of The Spartans	David Nicol-sey	
2015	Finally As featured artiste	—N/a	
2015	The Warning As featured artiste	GYO Gyimah	
2014	Adonai	Nana Asihene	
2014	Special Someone	Big Oj	
2013	Illuminati	Gyo Gyimah	
2013	Down On One	Moe Musa	
2013	Pon Di Tin	Sesan	
2012	Gunshot	Sesan	
2012	Bayla Trap	6miludo media	

== Singles released ==
Makye singles

- Lay Away Rap
- Borga Rap
- Push
- Babe

Rapperholic singles

- Good Bye
- One Time for Your Mind
- You Go Kill Me
- Living Legend
- Onyame Nhyra

Sarkology singles

- Gunshot
- Illuminati
- Lies
- Bounce
- Down on One
- Pon D Ting
- Ordinary Love
- Preach

Highest singles

- Silence ft. Suli Breaks
- Overdose ft Jesse Jagz,
- Come To Me ft. Bobii Lewis
- We No Dey Fear ft. Jayso
- Love Yourself ft. Moelogo
- Far Away ft. Korede Bello
- Your Waist ft. Flavour
- Glory ft. Yung L
- Pain Killer ft. Runtown,
- All Night ft. Victoria Kimani
- All I Want Is You ft. Praize
- See Only You ft. Jayso
- Baby Mama ft. Joey B
- Interlude - Highest Part 3-ft Suli Breaks
- Interlude - Highest Part 2-ft Suli Breaks
- Light It Up - ft Big Narstie & Jayso
- Certified - ft. Jayso & Worlasi

Black Love singles

- Saara ft. Efya
- Cant Let You Go ft. King Promise,
- Lucky ft. Rudebwoy
- Party & Bullshit ft. Idris Elba & Donaeo
- Do You ft. Mr.Eazi

== Other singles ==
These are some of the singles released by Sarkodie.

- Revenge of the Spartans
- New Guy (song)
- Love Rocks
- Shots on Shots
- Oluwa Is Involved
- "And 1" (Feat Dex Kwesi X Rayoe)
- Adonai Remix
- Whine fi me
- Chingum
- Megye wo girl
- You Go Kill Me remix
- Inflation
- Talk of Gh
- Broke Niggas
- Thank You
- Ask Dumelo
- Biibi Ba
- Rush Hour
- Bumper
- Oofeets)
- Year Of Return
- Fa Hooki Me
- Ceo flow
- Overload
- Happy Day
- Sarkodie - Otan 2024
- Sarkodie - Till We Die feat. Ruger
- No Fugazy
- Brag
- No Sir
- Messiah ft Kweku Flick
- RG Qluck Wise – Love You More (as a featured artiste)
- Violence ft Kweku Smoke
- Lavida Loca (2025)

=== 2026 ===
- Put It On God ft Alor G
- Odo Pa ft Kweku Flick
