= List of awards and nominations received by Sarkodie =

List of Sarkodie's awards
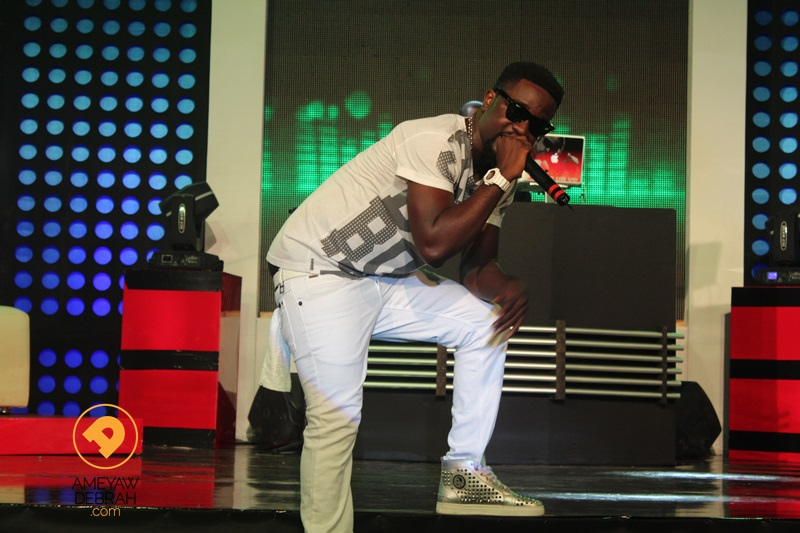
- Sarkodie performing at an event.
| Award | Wins | Nominations |
| Ghana Music Awards | 30 | 242 |
| MOBO Awards | 0 | 2 |
| Independent Music Awards | 1 | 1 |
| Channel O Music Video Awards | 0 | 3 |
| Nigeria Entertainment Awards | 2 | 3 |
| The Future Africa Awards | 0 | 1 |
| National Youth Achievement Award | 1 | 1 |
| 4syte Music Video Awards | 20 | 41 |
| City People Entertainment Awards | 0 | 1 |
| World Music Awards | 0 | 3 |
| MTV Africa Music Awards | 1 | 3 |
| BET Awards | 2 | 4 |
| African Muzik Magazine Awards | 2 | 2 |
| Ghana Music Honors | 2 | 2 |
| Ben TV Awards | 1 | 1 |
| Caribbean American and African Nations Music Awards | 1 | 1 |
| SoundCity Music Video Awards | 3 | 4 |
| The Headies | 3 | 3 |
| Ovation Red Carol & Awards | 1 | 1 |
| Museke Online African Music Awards | 1 | 1 |
| Afrobeats Music Award | 1 | 1 |
| Bass Awards | 2 | 3 |
| MOGO Awards | 1 | 1 |
| International Reggae and World Music Awards | 1 | 0 |
| EMY Awards | 1 | 0 |
| Ghana Kids Choice Awards | 1 | 0 |
| Ghana Music Awards UK | 8 | 11 |
| YouTube Sub Sahara Africa Creator Awards | 1 | 0 |
| African Entertainment Legend Awards | 1 | 0 |
| Ghana Event Awards | 1 | 2 |
| Daf BAMA Awards | 1 | 0 |
| 3 Music Awards | 14 | 31 |
| Ghana Entertainment Awards | 2 | 3 |
| Entertainment Achievement Awards | 1 | 0 |
| HiPipo Music Awards | 1 | 0 |
| All Africa Music Awards | 1 | 0 |
| MTV Europe Music Award | 0 | 1 |
| African Entertainment Awards USA | 1 | 0 |
| BET Hip Hop Awards | 1 | 0 |
| Ghana DJ Awards | 1 | 0 |
| Ghana Music Awards USA | 4 | 2 |
- Totals
| Awards won | 120 |
| Nominations | 204 |

Ghanaian rapper and hiplife artist Sarkodie has received 120 awards from 206 nominations, including 30 Ghana Music Awards. Makye, his debut studio album, won him three awards at both the 4syte TV Music Video Awards and Ghana Music Awards. The album also earned him a nomination at the 2010 MTV Africa Music Awards. Rapperholic, his second studio album, earned him accolades at the 2012 editions of the BET Awards, The Headies, Ghana Music Awards, National Youth Achievement Awards, MOBO Awards, and Channel O Music Video Awards.

Sarkodie's collaborative album recorded with Jayso, titled T.M.G, earned him an award at the 2013 4Syte TV Music Video Awards, as well as a nomination at the 2013 Ghana Music Awards. He won Best African Act at the 2013 Nigeria Entertainment Awards. The release of Sarkology in 2014 earned Sarkodie several awards, including four Ghana Music Awards, one MTV Africa Music Award, one Independent Music Award, four 4syte TV Music Video Awards, one Headies Award, and one Ghana Music Honor. He also received a nomination at the 2014 BET Awards and was nominated four times at the 2014 World Music Awards. Sarkodie won Best West African Act at the 2013 Caribbean American and African Nations Music Awards. Moreover, he won Best Rap Act at the 2014 African Muzik Magazine Awards. He was honoured by the organizers of the Afrobeats Music Awards for his outstanding contribution to the growth and development of African music globally. Sarkodie also won two awards for the singles "Love Rocks" and "Enemies". and base on his consistency in Ghana music Sarkodie won artiste of the decade award in the just ended Vodafone Ghana music awards 2019. In November 2020, Sarkodie won his first award at the Ghana DJ Awards for the DJs' Song of The Year category with his 2019 hit, Oofeetsor featuring Prince Bright of Bukbak fame

In October 2019, Sarkodie became the first artist to win the Best International Flow award at BET Hip Hop Awards.

== Awards and nominations ==
=== BET Awards ===
| Year | Nominee / work | Award | Result |
|---|---|---|---|
| 2012 | Sarkodie | Best International Act: Africa | Won |
| 2014 | Sarkodie | Best International Act: Africa | Nominated |
| 2015 | Sarkodie | Best International Act: Africa | Nominated |

=== BET Hip Hop Awards ===
| Year | Nominee / work | Award | Result |
|---|---|---|---|
| 2019 | Sarkodie | Best International Flow | Won |

=== MTV Europe Music Award ===
| Year | Nominee / work | Award | Result |
|---|---|---|---|
| 2012 | Sarkodie | Best Worldwide Act | Nominated |

=== EMY Awards ===
| Year | Nominee / work | Award | Result |
|---|---|---|---|
| 2016 | Sarkodie | Best Entertainer | Won |

=== 3 Music Awards ===
| Year | Nominee / work | Award | Result |
|---|---|---|---|
| 2018 | Sarkodie | Hiplife/Hiphop Act Of The Year | Won |
| 2018 | Highest | Album Of The Year | Won |
| 2018 | Overdose | Best Video | Won |
| 2018 | Fancy Gadam and Sarkodie | Best Collaboration | Won |
| 2020 | Sarkodie | Hiplife/Hiphop Act Of The Year | Won |
| 2020 | Sarkodie | Music Man Of The Year | Won |
| 2020 | Who Da Man | Best Rap Performance | Won |
| 2020 | Sarkodie and Efya | Best Collaboration | Won |
| 2020 | Sark Nation | Fan Army Of The Year | Won |
| 2021 | Sarkodie | Performer Of The Year | Won |
| 2021 | Oofeetso | Hiplife Song Of The Year | Won |
| 2021 | Sarkodie | Digital Act Of The Year | Nominated |
| 2021 | Sarkodie and King Promise | Best Collaboration | Won |
| 2021 | Sarkodie | Artiste Of The Year | Nominated |
| 2021 | Oofeetso | Song Of The Year | Nominated |
| 2021 | Hiplife/ HipHop Artiste Of The Year | Sarkodie | Nominated |
| 2021 | Sarkodie | Rapper Of The Year | Nominated |
| 2021 | Black Love | Album Of The Year | Nominated |
| 2021 | Sarkodie | Fan Army Of The Year | Nominated |
| 2022 | Rollies and Cigars | Video of the Year | Won |
| 2022 | Happy Day ft. Kuami Eugene | Hiplife Song of the Year | Won |
| 2022 | Sarkodie | Digital Act of the Year | Nominated |
| 2022 | Sarkodie | Artist of the Year | Nominated |
| 2022 | Happy Day ft. Kuami Eugene | Best Collaboration of the Year | Nominated |
| 2022 | Sark Nation | Fan Army of the Year | Nominated |
| 2022 | Happy Day ft. Kuami Eugene | Song of the Year | Nominated |
| 2022 | Sarkodie | Hiplife/Hip Hop Act of the Year | Nominated |
| 2022 | Rollies and Cigars | Hip-Hop Song of the Year | Nominated |
| 2022 | Rollies and Cigars | Rapper of the Year | Nominated |
| 2022 | No Pressure | Album of the Year | Nominated |
| 2022 | Song of the Year | Happy Day ft. Kuami Eugene | Nominated |

=== Daf BAMA Awards ===
| Year | Nominee / work | Award | Result |
|---|---|---|---|
| 2017 | Sarkodie | Best African Act | Won |

=== International Reggae and World Music Awards ===
| Year | Nominee / work | Award | Result |
|---|---|---|---|
| 2021 | Black Love Virtual Concert | Best Virtual Showcase/Concert | Won |

=== Entertainment Achievement Awards ===
| Year | Nominee / work | Award | Result |
|---|---|---|---|
| 2021 | Black Love Virtual Concert | Event Of The Year | Won |

=== Ghana Event Awards ===
| Year | Nominee / work | Award | Result |
|---|---|---|---|
| 2017 | Rapperholic concert | Ghana's Favourite Event | Won |

=== Ghana Entertainment Awards ===
| Year | Nominee / work | Award | Result |
|---|---|---|---|
| 2018 | Sarkodie | Hiplife/Rap Act | Won |
| 2018 | Highest | Album Of The Year | Nominated |
| 2018 | Sarkodie | Best Male Act | Won |
| 2018 | Sarkodie | Best Entertainer Of The Year | Nominated |
| 2018 | Sarkodie | Best Collaboration | Nominated |

=== MTV Africa Music Awards ===
| Year | Nominee / work | Award | Result |
|---|---|---|---|
| 2010 | Sarkodie | Best Anglophone | Nominated |
| 2014 | Sarkodie | Best Hip Hop | Won |
| 2015 | Sarkodie | Best Male | Nominated |
| 2021 | Sarkodie | Listener's Choice | Pending |

=== All Africa Music Awards ===
| Year | Nominee / work | Award | Result |
|---|---|---|---|
| 2018 | Sarkodie | Best Male Artist Inspirational Music | Won |

=== YouTube Sub Sahara Africa Creator Awards ===
| Year | Nominee / work | Award | Result |
|---|---|---|---|
| 2016 | Sarkodie | Top Subscribed Channel Ghana | Won |

=== Ghana DJ Awards 2020 ===
| Year | Nominee / work | Award | Result |
|---|---|---|---|
| 2020 | Oofetsɔ | DJ Song Of The Year | Won |

=== Ghana Music Honors ===
| Year | Nominee / work | Award | Result |
|---|---|---|---|
| 2015 | Sarkodie | Artist Of The Year | Won |
| 2017 | Sarkodie | Best Male Artist Honour | Won |

=== Africa Entertainment Legend Awards ===
| Year | Nominee / work | Award | Result |
|---|---|---|---|
| 2016 | Sarkodie | African Legend Artist Of The Year | Won |

=== The Future Africa Awards ===
| Year | Nominee / work | Award | Result |
|---|---|---|---|
| 2014 | Sarkodie | Prize in Entertainment | Nominated |

=== Ovation Red Carol & Awards ===
| Year | Nominee / work | Award | Result |
|---|---|---|---|
| 2012 | Sarkodie | Non-Nigerian artist of the year | Won |

=== African Entertainment Awards USA ===
| Year | Nominee / work | Award | Result |
|---|---|---|---|
| 2019 | Sarkodie | Best Hiphop Artist | Won |

=== HiPipo Music Awards ===
| Year | Nominee / work | Award | Result |
|---|---|---|---|
| 2019 | Sarkodie | Africa HipHop Maestro | Won |

=== Ben Tv Awards ===
| Year | Nominee / work | Award | Result |
|---|---|---|---|
| 2014 | Sarkodie | African Artist Of The Year | Won |

=== The Headies ===
| Year | Nominee / work | Award | Result |
|---|---|---|---|
| 2013 | Sarkodie | Best African Artiste | —N/a |
| 2012 | Sarkodie | African Artist of the Year | Won |
| 2014 | Sarkodie | African Artist of the Year | Won |
| 2015 | Sarkodie | African Artist of the Year | Won |
| 2016 | Sarkodie | Best African Artiste | —N/a |

=== Caribbean American and African Nations Music Awards ===
| Year | Nominee / work | Award | Result |
|---|---|---|---|
| 2013 | Sarkodie | Best West African Act | Won |

=== National Youth Achievement Award ===
| Year | Nominee / work | Award | Result |
|---|---|---|---|
| 2012 | Sarkodie | Award for achievement in music | Won |

=== Afrobeats Music Awards ===
| Year | Nominee / work | Award | Result |
|---|---|---|---|
| 2015 | Sarkodie | Afrobeats Music Awards - Outstanding Contribution To The Growth & Development Of African Music Globally | Won |

=== Independent Music Awards ===
| Year | Nominee / work | Award | Result |
|---|---|---|---|
| 2014 | "Illuminati" | Rap/Hip-Hop - Song | Won |

=== Ghana Music Awards UK ===
| Year | Nominee / work | Award | Result |
|---|---|---|---|
| 2016 | Sarkodie | Best Rapper | Won |
| 2016 | Sarkodie | Artist Of The Year | Nominated |
| 2016 | Mary | Album Of The Year | Nominated |
| 2016 | Jupitar and Sarkodie | Best Dancehall Collaboration | Won |
| 2017 | Sarkodie | Best Rapper | Won |
| 2017 | Sarkodie | Hiplife/Hip Hop Artist Of The Year | Won |
| 2017 | Pain Killer | Best Music Video | Won |
| 2017 | RNS | Hiplife Song Of The Year | Won |
| 2018 | "Light it up" (featuring Jay So) | Best Rapper of the year | Nominated |
| 2019 | Sarkodie | Best Rapper | Nominated |
| 2019 | Sarkodie | Hiplife Artist Of The Year | Nominated |
| 2019 | Sarkodie | Artist Of The Year | Nominated |
| 2019 | Can’t Let You Go | Best Music Video Of The Year | Won |
| 2019 | Can’t Let You Go | Popular Song Of The Year | Nominated |
| 2019 | Can’t Let You Go | Hiplife Song Of The Year | Nominated |
| 2022 | Sarkodie | Best Rapper | Won |
| 2022 | Sarkodie | Hiplife/ Hip Hop Artist of the Year | Nominated |
| 2022 | Sarkodie | Artist Of The Year | Nominated |
| 2022 | Rollies and Cigars | Best Music Video Of The Year | Nominated |
| 2022 | Coachella | Hiplife/ Hip Hop Song of the Year | Nominated |

=== Ghana Music Awards USA ===
| Year | Nominee / work | Award | Result |
|---|---|---|---|
| 2020 | Sarkodie | Artist Of The Year | Won |
| 2020 | Sarkodie | Hiphop/Hiplife Artist Of The Year | Won |
| 2020 | Oofeetso | Most Popular Song Of The Year | Nominated |
| 2020 | Oofeetso | Hiphop/Hiplife Song Of The Year | Won |
| 2020 | Saara | Best collaboration Of The Year | Won |
| 2020 | Saara | Highlife Song Of The Year | Nominated |

=== SoundCity Music Video Awards ===
| Year | Nominee / work | Award | Result |
|---|---|---|---|
| 2018 | Sarkodie | Best Hiphop | Nominated |
| 2018 | Sarkodie | African Artist Of The Year | Nominated |
| 2018 | Sarkodie | Best Male MVP | Nominated |
| 2018 | Pain Killer | Best Collaboration | Won |
| 2010 | Lay Away | Best Collaboration In A Music Video | Won |

=== Bass Awards ===
| Year | Nominee / work | Award | Result |
|---|---|---|---|
| 2015 | Sarkodie and Samini | Best Reggae Collaboration | Won |
| 2015 | Jupitar and Sarkodie | Best Dancehall Collaboration | Won |

=== Ghana Music Awards ===
| Year | Nominee / work | Award | Result |
|---|---|---|---|
| 2024 | Sarkodie - Otan | Best Hip Hop Song of the Year | Won |
| 2023 | Sarkodie | Best Collaboration of the Year | Won |
| 2023 | Sarkodie | Best Hiplife/Hiphop Artiste of the Year | Won |
| 2022 | Sarkodie | Best Hiplife/Hip Hop Artiste of the Year | Won |
| 2021 | Happy Day | Best Collaboration | Won |
| 2020 | Lucky | Best International Collaboration | Won |
| 2020 | Sarkodie | Artiste Of The Year | Nominated |
| 2020 | Sarkodie | Hip Hop/Hip Life artist of the year | Nominated |
| 2020 | Sarkodie | Best Rapper | Nominated |
| 2020 | Oofeetso | Hiplife song of the year | Nominated |
| 2020 | Oofeetso | Collaboration of the year | Won |
| 2020 | Oofeetso | Popular Of The Year | Nominated |
| 2020 | Saara | Highlife song of the year | Nominated |
| 2020 | Saara | Collaboration of the year | Nominated |
| 2020 | Black Love | Album of the year | Nominated |
| 2020 | Bleeding | Hiphop song of the year | Nominated |
| 2019 | Sarkodie | Artiste Of The Decade | Won |
| 2019 | Sarkodie | Hip Hop/Hip Life artist of the year | Nominated |
| 2019 | Sarkodie | Best Rapper | Nominated |
| 2019 | Sarkodie | Artist of the year | —N/a |
| 2019 | Bibii Ba | Hip hop song of the year | Nominated |
| 2019 | Bibii Ba | Music Video Of The Year | Nominated |
| 2019 | Cant Let You Go | Song of the year | —N/a |
| 2019 | Cant Let You Go | Hip life song of the year | Nominated |
| 2019 | Cant Let You Go | Best Collaboration of the year | Nominated |
| 2018 | Sarkodie | Hip Hop/Hip Life artist of the year | Won |
| 2018 | Sarkodie | Best Rapper | Won |
| 2018 | Sarkodie | Artist of the year | Nominated |
| 2018 | Light It Up | Hip hop song of the year | Nominated |
| 2018 | Pain Killer | Song of the year | Nominated |
| 2018 | Pain Killer | Hip life song of the year | Nominated |
| 2018 | Pain Killer | Best Collaboration of the year | Nominated |
| 2018 | Glory | Record of the year | Nominated |
| 2017 | Sarkodie | Hip Hop/Hip Life artist of the year | Won |
| 2017 | Sarkodie | Best Rapper | Nominated |
| 2017 | Sarkodie | Artist of the year | Nominated |
| 2017 | Trumpet | Hip hop song of the year | Nominated |
| 2017 | RNS | Song of the year | Nominated |
| 2017 | RNS | Hip life song of the year | Nominated |
| 2016 | Sarkodie | Best rapper | Won |
| 2016 | Sarkodie | Hip hop/Hip Life artist of the year | Nominated |
| 2016 | Sarkodie | Artist of the year | Nominated |
| 2016 | Hand to mouth | Hip hop song of the year | Won |
| 2016 | Bra | Record of the year | Won |
| 2016 | Mary | Album of the year | Nominated |
| 2015 | Sarkodie | Hiplife/Hip pop artist of the year | Won |
| 2015 | Adonai | Best collaboration of the year | Won |
| 2015 | Adonai | Vodafone song of the year | Won |
| 2014 | Sarkodie | Artiste of the Year | Nominated |
| 2014 | Sarkodie | Hiplife/ Hip Hop Artiste of the Year | Won |
| 2014 | Sarkodie | Best Rapper of the Year | Won |
| 2014 | "Tonga" (Joey B featuring Sarkodie) | Vodafone Song of the Year | Nominated |
| 2014 | "Down On One" (Sarkodie featuring Fuse ODG) | Vodafone Song of the Year | Nominated |
| 2014 | "Down On One" (Sarkodie featuring Fuse ODG) | Best Collaboration of the Year | Nominated |
| 2014 | Sarkology | Album of the Year | Won |
| 2014 | "Illuminati" | Hip hop Song of the Year | Won |
| 2013 | "Azonto Fiesta" (with Appietus & Kesse) | Best Collaboration of the Year | Nominated |
| 2013 | "Azonto Fiesta" (with Appietus & Kesse) | Song Of The Year | Nominated |
| 2013 | "Azonto Fiesta" (with Appietus & Kesse) | Hip Life Song Of The Year | Nominated |
| 2013 | "Pizza and Burger" (with Jayso) | Hip Hop Song of the Year | Nominated |
| 2013 | "Treat Her Royal" (Kesse featuring Sarkodie) | Highlife Song Of The Year | Nominated |
| 2012 | Sarkodie | Artist of the Year | Won |
| 2012 | Sarkodie | Hiplife/Hiphop Artist Of The Year | Nominated |
| 2012 | Sarkodie | Best Rapper Of The Year | Won |
| 2012 | "U Go Kill Me" (featuring EL) | Hiplife Song of the Year | Nominated |
| 2012 | "Sweetieo" (Raquel featuring Sarkodie) | Best Collaboration Of The Year | Nominated |
| 2012 | "I’m In Love With You" (featuring Efya) | Best Collaboration Of The Year | Nominated |
| 2012 | "U Go Kill Me" (featuring EL) | Best Collaboration Of The Year | Nominated |
| 2012 | "U Go Kill Me" (featuring EL) | Most Popular Song of the Year | Won |
| 2012 | Rapperholic | Album of the Year | Nominated |
| 2012 | "I’m In Love With You" (featuring Efya) | Hip hop Song Of The Year | Nominated |
| 2012 | "I’m In Love With You" (featuring Efya) | Record of the Year | Nominated |
| 2010 | Sarkodie | Ghana Artiste of the Year | Won |
| 2010 | Sarkodie | Ghana Discovery of the Year | Won |
| 2010 | Sarkodie | Ghana Hiplife/Hiphop artiste of the Year | Won |
| 2010 | Sarkodie | Album of the Year | Won |
| 2010 | Sarkodie | Ghana Best Rapper of the Year | Won |

=== City People Entertainment Awards ===
| Year | Nominee / work | Award | Result |
|---|---|---|---|
| 2014 | Sarkodie | Musician of the Year (Male) | Nominated |
| 2013 | Sarkodie | Musician of the Year (Male) | Nominated |

=== MOBO Awards ===
| Year | Nominee / work | Award | Result |
|---|---|---|---|
| 2012 | Sarkodie | Best African Act | Nominated |
| 2017 | Sarkodie | Best African Act | Nominated |

=== MOGO Awards ===
| Year | Nominee / work | Award | Result |
|---|---|---|---|
| 2016 | Mary | Best Album | Won |

=== Nigeria Entertainment Awards ===
| Year | Nominee / work | Award | Result |
|---|---|---|---|
| 2012 | Sarkodie | Pan African Artist or Group of the Year | |
| 2013 | Sarkodie | Western African Artist or Group of the Year | |
| 2014 | Sarkodie | African Artist of the Year (Non-Nigerian) | |
| 2015 | Sarkodie | African Artist of the Year (Non-Nigerian) | |
| 2018 | Sarkodie | Best African Male Artist (Non-Nigerian) | |

=== World Music Awards ===
| Year | Nominee / work | Award | Result |
|---|---|---|---|
| 2014 | Sarkodie | World's Best Male Artist | Nominated |
| 2014 | Sarkodie | World's Best Live Act | Nominated |
| 2014 | Sarkodie | World's Best Entertainer | Nominated |
| 2014 | Sarkology | World’s Best Album | Nominated |

=== African Muzik Magazine Awards ===
| Year | Nominee / work | Award | Result |
|---|---|---|---|
| 2014 | Sarkodie | Best Male West Africa | Nominated |
| 2014 | Sarkodie | Best Rap Act | Won |
| 2017 | Sarkodie | Best Rap Act | Won |

=== 4syte Music Video Awards ===
| Year | Nominee / work | Award | Result |
|---|---|---|---|
| 2021 | "Sarkodie" | Overall best | Nominated |
| 2021 | "Sarkodie" | Most Influential | Nominated |
| 2021 | "Happy Day" | Best Collaboration | Won |
| 2021 | "Happy Day" | Best Hiplife | Nominated |
| 2021 | "Happy Day" | Most Popular | Nominated |
| 2021 | "Happy Day" | Bigtune | Nominated |
| 2021 | "Happy Day" | Best Male | Nominated |
| 2021 | "Gimme Way" (featuring “Prince Bright”) | Best Hiphop | Nominated |
| 2019 | "Sarkodie" | Life Time Achievement | Won |
| 2019 | "Bibiiba" | Best Hip Hop Video | Won |
| 2019 | "Bibiiba" | Best Photography | Nominated |
| 2019 | "Bibiiba" | Best Directed Video | Nominated |
| 2019 | "Can’t Let You Go" (featuring “King Promise”) | Best Hiplife Video | Nominated |
| 2019 | "Can’t Let You Go" (featuring “King Promise”) | Best Male Video | Won |
| 2019 | "Can’t Let You Go" (featuring “King Promise”) | Most Influential | Nominated |
| 2017 | "Overdose" | Overall Best Video | Won |
| 2017 | "Overdose" | Best Photography | Nominated |
| 2017 | "Overdose" | Best Hip Hop Video | Nominated |
| 2017 | "Overdose" | Best Directed Video | Nominated |
| 2017 | "Come To Me" (featuring “Bobbi Lewis”) | Best Collaboration Video | Won |
| 2017 | "Come To Me" (featuring “Bobbi Lewis”) | Best Male Video | Nominated |
| 2017 | "Come To Me" (featuring “Bobbi Lewis”) | Best Edited Video | Nominated |
| 2017 | "Pain Killer" (featuring “Runtown”) | Most Popular Video | Nominated |
| 2015 | Special Someone" | Best Collaboration Video | Won |
| 2014 | Adonai" | Best Hip Life Video | Won |
| 2014 | Adonai" | Most Influential Artist | Won |
| 2013 | "Illuminati" | Best Directed Video | Won |
| 2013 | "Illuminati" | Most Popular Video | Won |
| 2013 | "Illuminati" | Best Hip Hop Video | Won |
| 2013 | "Illuminati" | Overall Best Video/ Most Influential Artiste | Won |
| 2013 | "Illuminati" | Best Male Video | Nominated |
| 2013 | "Illuminati" | Best Photography | Nominated |
| 2013 | "Illuminati" | Best Edited Video | Nominated |
| 2013 | "I'm In Luv With Ur Girlfriend" (Jayso featuring Efya and Sarkodie) | Best Collaboration Video | Nominated |
| 2013 | "I'm In Luv With Ur Girlfriend" (Jayso featuring Efya and Sarkodie) | Best Story Line Video | Won |
| 2013 | "Hallelujah" (featuring Viviane Chidid) | Best Collaboration Video | —N/a |
| 2012 | "Saa Okodie No" (featuring Obrafour) | Best Hip Life Video | Won |
| 2012 | "Saa Okodie No" (featuring Obrafour) | Best Directed Video | Nominated |
| 2012 | "Saa Okodie No" (featuring Obrafour) | Best Collaboration Video | Nominated |
| 2012 | "Saa Okodie No" (featuring Obrafour) | Best African Act Video | Nominated |
| 2012 | "Saa Okodie No" (featuring Obrafour) | Overall Best Video | Nominated |
| 2012 | "U Go Kill Me" (featuring E.L) | Best Choreography Video | Nominated |
| 2012 | "Bebree" (Herty Borngreat featuring Sarkodie) | Best Gospel Video | Nominated |
| 2011 | "Lay Away" (featuring Sway and Jayso) | Best Hip Hop Video | Won |
| 2011 | "Lay Away" (featuring Sway and Jayso) | Best Editing | Won |
| 2011 | "Lay Away" (featuring Sway and Jayso) | Best Directed Video | Nominated |
| 2011 | "Ajiee" (R2Bees, Sarkodie and Nana Boroo) | Best Collaboration Video | Won |
| 2011 | "Sue" | Best Hip Life Video (Stay J featuring Sarkodie and Dr. Cryme) | Nominated |
| 2011 | "Ambulance" (Wutah Kobby featuring Sarkodie) | Best Special Effects | Nominated |
| 2010 | "Borga" (featuring Jay Town) | Best Editing | Won |
| 2010 | "Borga" (featuring Jay Town) | Best Hip Life Video | Nominated |
| 2010 | "Borga" (featuring Jay Town) | Best Collaboration Video | Nominated |
| 2010 | "Babe" (Sarkodie featuring Mugeez) | Best Photography | Won |

=== Channel O Music Video Awards ===
| Year | Nominee / work | Award | Result |
|---|---|---|---|
| 2012 | "Saa Okodie No" (featuring Obrafour) | Most Gifted West African Video of the Year | Nominated |
| 2014 | "Illuminati" | Most Gifted Male | Nominated |
| 2014 | "Illuminati" | Most Gifted Video of the Year | Nominated |

=== South African Hip Hop Awards ===
| Year | Recipient(s) and nominee(s) | Category | Result | Ref. |
|---|---|---|---|---|
| 2021 | Sarkodie | Best International Act | Pending | |
