= King of Accra =

Ghanaian sound engineer and rapper

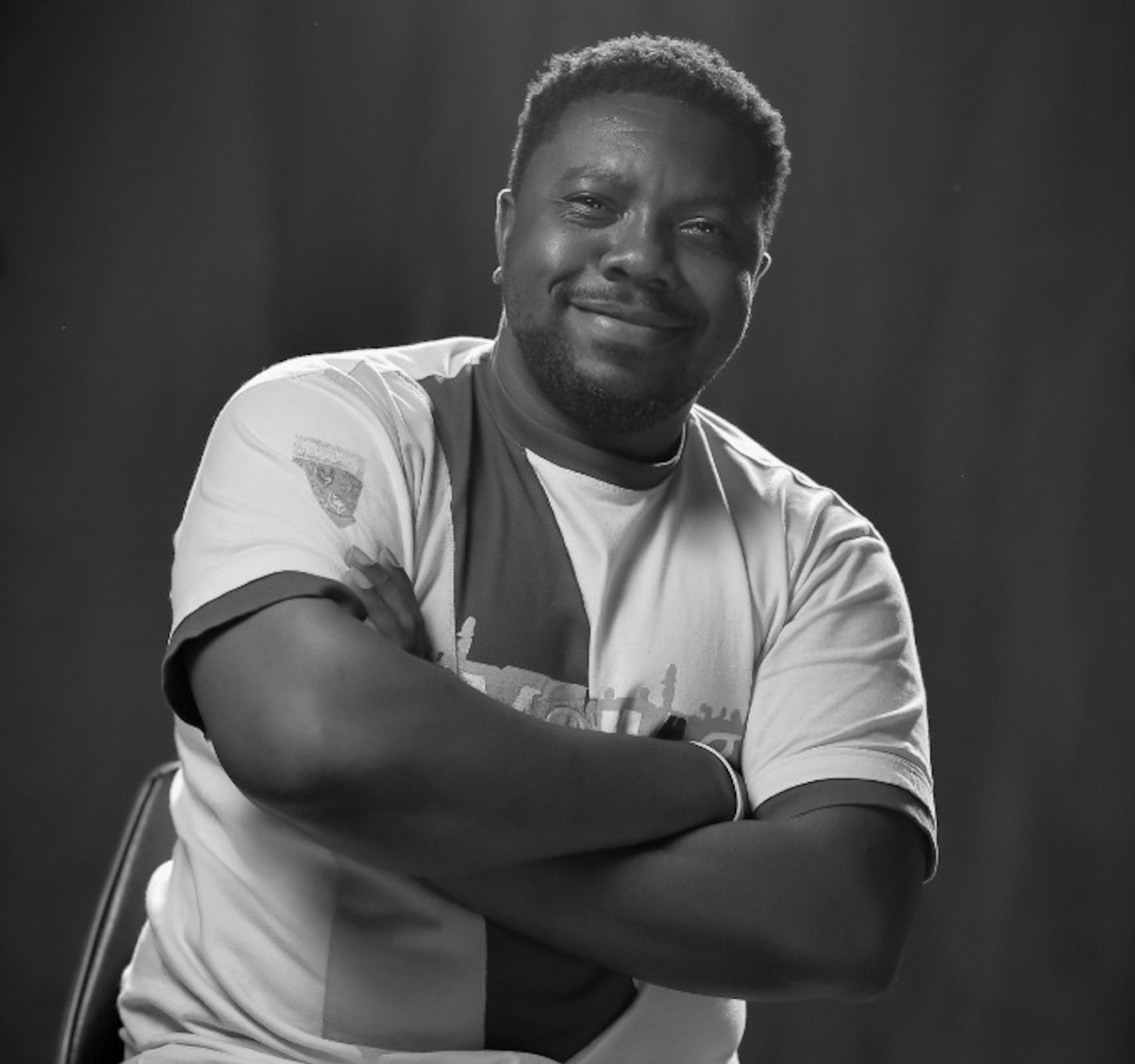

Background information
- Born: Nii Kommetey Commey; Accra, Ghana
- Occupation(s): Record producer, sound engineer, singer
- Years active: 2008–present
- Labels: Independent

Nii Kommetey Commey also known as King of Accra is a Ghanaian Record producer, sound engineer and rapper-singer. His work on the Bra bɛ whɛ song by Sarkodie which features Guru and himself gained him attention in Ghanaian music circles. Nii Kommetey's productions includes "You already know" off the Sarkology album by Sarkodie and Daabi and This Game which are hit singles by Sarkodie between 2009 and 2015 respectively. Other productions of his are "Pressure Girl" and Solo Artist by Samini, and "Bakaji" by DJ Mensah.

== Early life ==
King of Accra was born in Accra at North Kaneshie. He moved around Ghana as a young boy due to his father's work as a Christian Minister.He settled and grew up in Mempeasem at East Legon where he attended Elican School from Kindergarten till Junior High School from 1990 to 2001 .He had his secondary education at Accra Academy and completed in 2005. He enrolled into the University of Ghana in 2008 where he studied Philosophy, Psychology and Music.

== Career ==
In April 2019 he launched the website kingofaccra.com as a portal for musicians who are either already established or upcoming to get the beats they need for music creation. Exactly a year later in 2020 he released the single Lonely in the Garden on iTunes that was self-produced and began working on a series of projects that led up to his very first album titled Adulthood released in November 2020. Adulthood is a 19-track album produced by King of Accra featuring acts like Magnom.

== Production discography ==
Selected songs produced by King of Accra
Year	Title	Artiste	Producer(s)	Ref
2020	Adulthood	King of Accra debut Album ft artistes like Magnom	King of Accra	
2018	Go Harder	Paq featuring King of Accra, Kwesi Arther, Sticky	King of Accra	
2013	Y'all Already Know	Sarkodie	King of Accra	
2011	Daabi	Sarkodie	King of Accra	
2007	This Game	Sarkodie ft. Mohammed	King of Accra	
