= Skillion =

Skillion or Skillions may refer to:

- Skillion roof, a type of roof
  - A lean-to or shed with a skillion roof
- Skillion, a name for an indefinite or fictitious number
- Skillions Records, a record label founded by Jayso
- The Skillion, a promontory in Terrigal, New South Wales
