= New Guy =

New Guy or variants may refer to:

- "New Guys", first episode of the ninth season of the American comedy television series The Office
- The New Guy, 2002 American teen comedy film directed by Ed Decter
- "New Guy" (song), song by Ghanaian rapper Sarkodie
