= Pee GH =

Ghanaian record producer (born 1992)

- Also known as: Pee GH, Pee on Da Beat
- Born: Emmanuel Bartels; 20 January 1992 (age 34); Obuasi, Ghana
- Origin: Kwahu, Eastern Region, Ghana
- Genres: Afrobeat, Hip hop, Hiplife, Afropop
- Occupations: Recording artist, sound engineer, record producer, mixing engineer
- Instruments: Keyboard, sampler
- Years active: 2007–present

Emmanuel K. Bartels known professionally as Pee GH or Pee On Da Beat, is a New Jersey–based Ghanaian record producer. He is best known for producing hit songs such as E.L's "Koko", "Abaa", "Agbo", "Overdose", "Higher"; Shatta Wale – "Am Ok", "Level"; D2 – "Wawane"; Weisa Greid – "One Side", "Ice Cream Man", Samini's "my own (co-produced)" and also for mixing and masterings Sarkodie's "Sub Zero".

== Early life ==
Born and raised in Obuasi in the Ashanti Region of Ghana, Pee GH decided on his career in music at a young age where he started making beats using buckets and drums and also recording cassette tapes with his little brother at home by recording music of other people while adding his own vocals to it. He graduated from the University of Ghana, Legon

== Musical career ==
Pee GH started making beats and recorded his first song at E.L's studio before moving to New Jersey, United States. PEE GH started to live his dream as a record producer for many star artistes in Ghana and beyond, guided by Grammy mastering engineer, Chris Gehringer.

He has been credited with engineering for BET Award winners Sarkodie and Stonebwoy. In 2016, he won the N.E.G.A Award as Producer Of The Year and was nominated in 2016 as Producer of the Year, at the Ghana Music Awards

== Discography ==
- Sarkodie – Fa Hooki Me
- Sarkodie – Sub Zero (Mix and Mastering)
- E.L – Agbo
- E.L – Too Much Money
- E.L – Yaa School
- EL – Koko
- E.L feat. Joey B – Wosa
- EL – Overdose
- E.L – Collect Ft. Kwesi Arthur
- E.L – Higher
- E.L ft. Dope Nation – Ayeyi
- E.L ft Stonebwoy x Medikal – Dadado
- E.L. – Yaa Wor
- Pee GH ft Shatta Wale – Alright
- Pee Gh ft Shatta Wale x Wisa x Duke – Only U
- PEE Gh – Love ft Noelle
- PEE Gh ft Duke D2 – Die for you
- Shatta Wale – Am OK
- Shatta Wale – Level
- Shatta Wale – Gunshot
- Samini – my own
- Stonebwoy – Come from far
- Akeju ft. Beenie Man – kiss and tell
- Beenie Man – Everything Up ft. Stylo G, Seyi Shay
- Wisa greid – cream man
- Wisa Greid – One Side
- Gasmilla – Speedometer
- Pam Official – Bobo
- Duke D2 ft Shatta Wale – Wawane
- Chase – Afia Pokuaa
- Kwaw Kese ft Duke(D2) – Aseda
- Duke(D2) ft Shatta Wale – Too Sweet
- Squadee ft Sarkodie, Bright (Buk Bak) – You Are Mine
- Duke(D2) ft Kwaw Kese – Wonche Adze
- PerryOfficial – Pay Day

== Awards and nominations ==
YEAR	AWARD	CATEGORY	Nominated / Won
2016	N.E.G.A. Awards	Producer Of The Year	Won
2017	Ghana Music Awards	Producer of the Year	Nominated
2017	Ghana Entertainment Awards USA	Producer of the Year	Nominated
