= Come to Me (Sarkodie song) =

"Come To Me"

Single by Sarkodie featuring Bobii Lewis

from the album Highest
- Released: September 8, 2017
- Recorded: 2016
- Genre: Hip hop; R&B
- Length: 4:06
- Label: Sarkcess Music
- Songwriter(s): Sarkodie
- Producer(s): Jayso

Sarkodie featuring Bobii Lewis singles chronology
"Overdue" (2017)	"Come To Me" (2017)	"Silence" (2017)

"Come To Me" is a song by Ghanaian artist Sarkodie. It was released on September 8, 2017, on iTunes by Sarkcess Music. The song, produced by Jayso, features vocals from UK artist, Bobii Lewis. The song is off Sarkodie's fifth studio album Highest.

== Music video ==
The music video for "Come To Me" was released via Sarkodie's YouTube account on September 8, 2017, and has over 400,000 views.

== Accolades ==
Year	Award Ceremony	Prize	Result
2017	4Style TV Music Video Awards	Best Collabo Video	Won
