= DJ Mensah =

Ghanaian DJ and event promoter

Dj Mensah -The Untouchable
- Also known as: The Untouchable
- Born: Michael Mensah Ayenu; 7 November; Accra NewTown, Ghana
- Origin: Volta Region
- Education: Accra Polytechnic; Central University
- Genres: Hip hop, Afro pop and Hip life? Afrobeats, dancehall, Reggae
- Occupations: DJ, event promoter
- Instrument: Turntables
- Years active: 2009–present
- Label: Untouchable Music /Sarkcess Music
- Website: www.djmensahonline.com

Michael Mensah Ayenu, known professionally as DJ Mensah, is a Ghanaian DJ, event promoter, and entrepreneur. He was the official DJ for 15-time Ghana Music and BET awards winner Sarkodie. Known as the "Untouchable", he holds a track record of events to his name such as Akwaaba UK's "December In Ghana" events, "Party in the Park" as well as his annual DJ Mensah "All White Party". He is also the CEO of an event company called A-Town entertainment. In 2017, he was awarded best DJ at the 2017 Ghana entertainment awards. In 2018, he founded and launched the "DJ Mensah Foundation and touched lives of young ones at the borstal home in Accra. He was also nominated for the Best DJ at the Ghana music and Arts Awards Europe .

== Life and career ==
=== Early life and DJ career ===
Michael Mensah Ayenu, popularly known as DJ Mensah, is a Ghanaian DJ, events promoter and entrepreneur who hails from Denu in the Volta Region of Ghana. Born on 7 November to Christian parents, Mr Mathew Ayenu and Mrs Mary Ayenu, he started developing love for Djing at a younger age in his Junior High School days at Calvary International School in Madina, Accra.

Having a father who believed in the importance of education, DJ Mensah was allowed to choose the career of his choice only if he stayed in school. In senior high school, Tema Secondary School, he read business, before switching to Visual Arts. He then read Purchasing and Supply at Accra Polytechnic before getting a degree in marketing from Central University.

Ultimately, he doubted whether radio was the right fit. Working isolated in a studio meant losing the direct audience feedback he valued; he preferred the live setting of clubs and events, where he could gauge crowd reactions instantly.

He started to be a DJ in 1999 out of passion, and decided to take it up as a career when he started being paid as a DJ. His career took off when he met Nana Afful, a music event equipment owner who gave him a chance to use his equipment to sharpen his skills and also booked him for gigs. He also became the in-house DJ at Aphrodisiac Nite Club, and then Fred of Charter House, who is now with Evolution—who told him he was going to put him on the big stages then. True to his word, he found himself on the stages of Stars of The Future, Agro among others.

He worked as a manager for Venus World Multimedia and also was the Welfare Manager and Production Assistant for Empire Entertainment. He also worked with Xfm 95.1 as well.

He founded his non-governmental organization, DJ Mensah Foundation, and officially launched it in January 2018 with a charity event which provided free health screening and motivational talks to the juvenile inmates at the Senior Correctional Centre (formerly known as Borstal Home).

In 2026, he established PlayHouse Music Studio, a production facility for musicians, podcasters, and digital content creators.

== Discography ==
=== Mixtapes ===
- Azonto To The World Vol. 1 (2012)
- Azonto To The World Vol. 2 (2013)
- Sarkolomix (Road To Sarkcess) (2014)
- Just Cruizing
- Afrochronik Vol. 1 (2016)
- Afrochronik Vol. 2 (2017)
- Monthly Compilations (Street is listening series) (2017)
- old Skool Mixtape By Dj mensah (2018)
- Sounds Of Africa (Monthly Compilation) (2019 )
- BSB stance Vol 2 (2019)
- Pae Muka Mixtape By Obrafour (2019)

=== Singles ===
- "My Wife" ft Okyeame Kwame and Lady Jay (2015)
- Bakaji ft Medikal, Strongman, Eno, Lil Shaker and Cabum (2017)
- Dancefloor ft Bisa Kdei (2017)

== Major concerts ==
- Nite with the Stars (Joy Fm -2007)
- Face of Legon (Empire Entertainment – 2007)
- Nite with 9ja (100degree – 2007)
- Stars of the future (Charter House – 2007)
- 4syte 1yr Anniversary (4Syte – 2007)
- Green Carpets Awards (Empire Entertainment 2008)
- MTN Go concert (Charter House – 2008)
- Ja- rule Concert{Ghana music awards}- (Charter House – 2008)
- Stars of the future (Charter House – 2008)
- Fat joe and Omarion Concert (Exclusive Vista Entertainment – 2008)
- Nite with the Stars (Joy Fm – 2008)
- 4syte music video awards (4syte studios 2009)
- 2131 One year anniversary (Radio advertizing people 2009)
- Star Grab The Mic (Ghana Brewery Company 2009)
- Ghana's Independence Day Bash in U.K (Akwaabauk 2010)
- Party in the park (Akwaabauk 2010)
- Ghana's most beautiful Holland (2010)
- Ghana's Independence Day Bash in U.K (Akwaabauk 2011)
- Party in the park (Akwaabauk 2011)
- Sarkodie's tour in U.S (Terry Masson Entertainment 2011)
- Azonto Tour in U.K (Akwaabauk 2011)
- T-pain Concert in Ghana (2011)
- Rapperholic Concert(2011)
- Pentagon beach party (2012)
- Ghana's Independence club tour in UK (2012)
- Grand opening of club Espanza in New York (2012)
- DJ Mensah club tour (2012)
- Rapperholic concert Kumasi (2012)
- Canada Summer Tour (2012)
- Sarkology concert (2013)
- BET experience (2014)
- Sarkodie In Gabon (2014)
- Sarkology concert UK
- BET experience (2015)
- Sarkodie In Liberia (2015)
- Vodafone X concert (2015)
- Sarkodie history in the making (2015)
- US Tour (2017)
- Europe Tour with Bisa Kdei (2017)
- Sarkodie Tour (2017)
- Ghana Meets Naija: London (2017)
- Rapperholic Concert (2012-2017)
- Vac With DJ Mensah (2019)
