= Black Love =

Black Love may refer to:

== Film and television ==
- Black Love, a 1971 American pornographic film directed by Herschell Gordon Lewis
- #BlackLove (2015 TV series), an American series broadcast by FYI
- Black Love (2017 TV series), an American docuseries

== Music ==
- Black Love (Sarkodie album), a 2019 album
- Black Love (The Afghan Whigs album), a 1996 album
- Black Love (Carlos Garnett album), a 1974 album, and its title track
