= Highest (Sarkodie album) =

Studio album by Sarkodie
- Released: September 8, 2017
- Recorded: 2016–17
- Studios: Sarm Music Village, London
- Genres: Hip hop; highlife; hiplife; R&B; Afropop
- Label: Sarkcess Music/Skillions Music/Dice Recordings
- Producers: Sarkodie (exec.), Jayso

Sarkodie chronology
Mary (2015)	Highest (2017)	Black Love (2019)

Singles from Highest
- 1. "Pain Killer" Released: February 3, 2017

Highest is the fourth studio album by Ghanaian rapper Sarkodie. It was released on September 8, 2017, by Sarkcess Music. The album comprises 19 tracks, including three interludes. Primarily produced by Jayso, it features guest appearances from Suli Breaks, Jesse Jagz, Bobii Lewis, Jayso, Moelogo, Korede Bello, Flavour, Yung L, Runtown and Victoria Kimani.

== Background ==
Highest is an inspirational album released by the rapper. He gained inspiration from his daughter Titi, who he said brought him happiness and changed him from who he was. Titi's image is featured on the album's cover art.

== Released signing ==
After releasing the album on digital platforms, Sarkodie organized an autograph signing session at the West Hills Mall in Accra on Sunday, September 10, 2017.

=== Accolades ===
Year	Awards ceremony	Award description(s)	Results
2018	3 Music Awards	Album of The Year	Won
2018	Ghana Entertainment Awards	Album of The Year	Won

== Track listing ==
All tracks are written by Sarkodie.

No.	Title	Length
1.	"Silence (feat. Suli Breaks)"	4:07
2.	"Overdose (feat. Jesse Jagz)"	3:24
3.	"Come to Me (feat. Bobii Lewis)"	4:07
4.	"Interlude - Highest, Pt. 1"	0:35
5.	"We No Dey Fear"	4:05
6.	"Certified (feat. Jayso & Worlasi)"	3:29
7.	"Love Yourself (feat. Moelogo)"	3:00
8.	"Interlude - Highest, Pt. 2"	0:35
9.	"Highest"	3:00
10.	"Light It Up (feat. Big Narstie & Jayso)"	4:57
11.	"Far Away (feat. Korede Bello)"	4:36
12.	"Your Waist"	3:33
13.	"Interlude - Highest, Pt. 3"	0:35
14.	"Baby Mama (feat. Joey B)"	3:12
15.	"All I Want Is You (feat. Praiz)"	5:21
16.	"All Night (feat. Victoria Kimani)"	3:23
17.	"See Only You (feat. Jayso)"	3:33
18.	"Glory"	3:22
19.	"Pain Killer (Bonus Track) (feat. Runtown)"	3:30
Total length:		59:44

== Release history ==
Region	Date	Format	Label
Ghana	September 8, 2017	CD, Digital download	Sarkcess Music
