= Akwaaba Music =

Ghanaian record label

- Founded: 2008
- Founder: Benjamin Lebrave
- Genre: Hiplife, Hip hop, Rap, R&B
- Country of origin: California, United States
- Location: Accra, Ghana
- Official website: akwaabamusic.com/en/

Akwaaba Music is a label and agency based in Accra, Ghana. The label distributes some of Ghana's biggest artists, including Joey B, EL, D-Black, Ruff N Smooth, Edem, DJ Breezy, as well as successful independent artists such as the FOKN Bois, Art Melody, Aero Manyelo, Rocky Marsiano and other artists from 19 African countries.

Akwaaba Music was founded in California in 2008 by Benjamin Lebrave. He created the company to make contemporary Ghanaian music accessible beyond Ghana's borders, by making it available on all major online music services, and by promoting it to global audiences. With time the company's services have grown to incorporate content production, digital distribution, marketing and licensing.

In 2011 Lebrave settled in Accra, Ghana, again developing the scope of Akwaaba Music's services by expanding into event production, by creating the sister company Akwaaba Selector, aimed at providing music to venues and corporate partners.
