= No Pressure (Sarkodie album) =

Studio album by Sarkodie
- Released: 30 July 2021
- Genres: Hip-hop; Afrobeats
- Length: 54:36
- Labels: Sarkcess Music; Ziiki Media
- Producers: AltraNova; Beatfreaks; Certified Bangerz; DJ Coublon; KaySo; Kaywa; MOG; Rexxie

Sarkodie chronology
Black Love (2019)	No Pressure (2021)	Jamz (2022)

No Pressure is the sixth studio album by Ghanaian rapper Sarkodie, released on 30 July 2021 through Sarkcess Music and Ziiki Media. The album features guest appearances from Vic Mensa, Giggs, Kwesi Arthur, Medikal, Cassper Nyovest, Wale, Moelogo, Darkovibes, Benerl, Harmonize, Oxlade, and MOG.

== Background ==
No Pressure was originally scheduled to be released on 9 July 2021, but due to sampling issues it was pushed back to 30 July 2021.

The release of the album came at the time of where Sarkodie described himself as feeling no pressure to put out records or to follow anyone else's lead, as he believed his career has lasted longer than most rappers careers. In an interview with OkayAfrica, He explained that he named the record No Pressure to signal viewers that he is on the "cruise control".

== Track listing ==
No Pressure track listing
No.	Title	Producer(s)	Length
1.	"Intro"		1:34
2.	"Rollies and Cigars"	KaySo	3:27
3.	"Vibration" (featuring Vic Mensa)	AltraNova	3:28
4.	"Round 2" (featuring Giggs)	Certified Bangerz	2:56
5.	"Coachella" (featuring Kwesi Arthur)	MOG	3:05
6.	"Jaara" (featuring Medikal)	AltraNova	3:01
7.	"Married to the Game" (featuring Cassper Nyovest)	AltraNova	4:06
8.	"Anything"	AltraNova	4:51
9.	"Fireworks" (featuring Wale and Moelogo)	Beatfreaks	3:26
10.	"Whipped" (featuring Darkovibes)	MOG	3:26
11.	"Deserve My Love"	MOG	2:40
12.	"Don't Cry" (featuring Benerl)	MOG	3:52
13.	"I Wanna Love You" (featuring Harmonize)	MOG	2:54
14.	"No Fugazy"	Rexxie	2:58
15.	"Non Living Thing" (featuring Oxlade)	DJ Coublon	3:49
16.	"I'll Be There" (featuring MOG)	MOG	4:57
Total length:			54:36

== Release history ==
Release history and formats for No Pressure
Region	Date	Format	Label
Various	30 July 2021	digital download; streaming	Sarkcess Music; Ziiki Media
