= Jamz (album) =

Studio album by Sarkodie
- Released: 11 November 2022
- Genre: Hip-hop; highlife; Afropop
- Length: 35:35
- Label: Sarkcess Music; Ziiki Media
- Producer: DJ Coublon; GuiltyBeatz; Masterkraft; Mog; TSB

Sarkodie chronology
No Pressure (2021)	Jamz (2022)	Championship (2024)

Singles from Jamz
- 1. "Labadi" Released: 23 September 2022

Jamz (stylized as JAMZ) is the seventh studio album by Ghanaian rapper Sarkodie, released on 11 November 2022 through Sarkcess Music and Ziiki Media. The album featured guest appearances from Black Sherif, Cina Soul, Oxlade, Lojay, Joeboy, Bnxn, Kranium, and King Promise. The lead single of the album is "Labadi", released on 23 September 2022.

== Background ==
Sarkodie did not planned on recording this album, as he was recording songs unrelated to the album. As he was recording the songs, he was inspired to make something that was a "fun" listening experience. This resulted in the recording of Jamz.

== Marketing ==
The "Jamz World Tour" was a worldwide tour that ran from 15 July 2023 to September 3 revolving around his album, Jamz. It spanned 11 cities across North America.

== Track listing ==
Credits adapted from Tidal.

Jamz track listing
No.	Title	Producer(s)	Length
1.	"Labadi" (featuring King Promise)	Coublon	3:18
2.	"She Bad" (featuring Oxlade)	GuiltyBeatz	5:00
3.	"Confam"	GuiltyBeatz	3:43
4.	"One Million Cedis" (featuring Ink boy)	Masterkraft	2:45
5.	"Cougar" (featuring Lojay)	GuiltyBeatz	3:29
6.	"Forever" (featuring Kranium)	Mog	3:33
7.	"Over Me" (featuring Cina Soul)	Mog	3:18
8.	"Hips Don't Lie" (featuring Joeboy)	Mog	3:19
9.	"Country Side" (featuring Black Sherif)	Mog	3:40
10.	"Better Days" (featuring Bnxn)	TSB	3:26
Total length:			35:35
