= Black Love (Sarkodie album) =

Studio album by Sarkodie
- Released: 20 December 2019
- Genres: Hip-Hop; Afrobeats
- Length: 51:51
- Producers: DJ Breezy; KillBeatz; MOG; GuiltyBeatz; Donae'o; Zapp Mallet

Sarkodie chronology
Highest (2017)	Black Love (2019)	No Pressure (2021)

Black Love is the fifth studio album by Ghanaian rapper and songwriter Sarkodie, released on 20 December 2019 through Sarkcess Music. The album features guest appearances from King Promise, Rudeboy, Mr Eazi, KiDi, Maleek Berry, Efya, Tekno, Kuami Eugene, Kizz Daniel, Stonebwoy, Sista Afia, Bisa Kdei, Shakka, Herman Suede (stylized as Herman $uede), Donae'o, and Idris Elba. Black Love was released five days before his annual concert Rapperholic, which was planned on 25 December.

== Background and release ==
The album follows Sarkodie's previous album, Highest, which was released in 2017. In an interview with OkayAfrica, Sarkodie shares his insights on the making of the album.

[the album] is just about love amongst black people and it's 90 or 80 percent based on relationships. [...] I really wanted [fans] to focus on the singles and pushing more, because what I realized was if you put out a whole project, sometimes they miss the records if it's too much. I wanted them to have time to enjoy at least four or five songs and then everything drops.

A day before its official release on 20 December 2019, the album was leaked by bloggers online, as revealed by Sarkodie in an interview with Andy Dosty on the Daybreak Hitz show right before Rapperholic.

== Promotion ==
To promote the album, Sarkodie performed a virtual concert at the Black Star Square on 17 August 2020 with fellow performers Efya, Joey B, King Promise, and Shatta Wale. The appearance of Shatta Wale set the closure of a five-year "feud" between him and Sarkodie.

== Track listing ==
Black Love track listing
No.	Title	Producer(s)	Length
1.	"Anadwo" (featuring King Promise)	DJ Breezy; KillBeatz	3:11
2.	"Lucky" (featuring Rudeboy)	MOG	4:27
3.	"Can't Let You Go" (featuring King Promise)	MOG	3:43
4.	"Do You" (featuring Mr Eazi)	GuiltyBeatz	3:23
5.	"Hello" (featuring KiDi)	MOG	4:01
6.	"Feelings" (featuring Maleek Berry)	MOG	3:41
7.	"Saara" (featuring Efya)	John Kwesi Donsunmu-Mensah	3:19
8.	"Take My Love" (featuring Tekno)	Tekno	2:54
9.	"Honey" (featuring Kuami Eugene)	MOG	3:17
10.	"Which One" (featuring Kizz Daniel)	MOG	3:20
11.	"Strength Of A Woman" (featuring Stonebwoy)	JMJ	3:13
12.	"Broken Heart" (featuring Sista Afia)	MOG	3:31
13.	"Obi Doba" (featuring Bisa Kdei)	MOG	3:48
14.	"Womba" (featuring Shakka and Herman Suede^{[a]})	Beatfreakz^{[b]}	2:50
15.	"Party & Bullshit" (featuring Donae'o and Idris Elba)	Donae'o; Mark Okraku-mantey; Zapp Mallet	3:06
Total length:			51:51

Notes

- ^{^[a]}stylized as Herman $uede.
- ^{^[b]}not to be confused with the Dutch house group Beatfreakz.

== Release history ==
Release history and formats for No Pressure
Region	Date	Format	Label
Various	20 December 2019	digital download; streaming	Sarkcess Music; Ziiki Media
