= Roshanak Motman =

CEO of Tigo Ghana

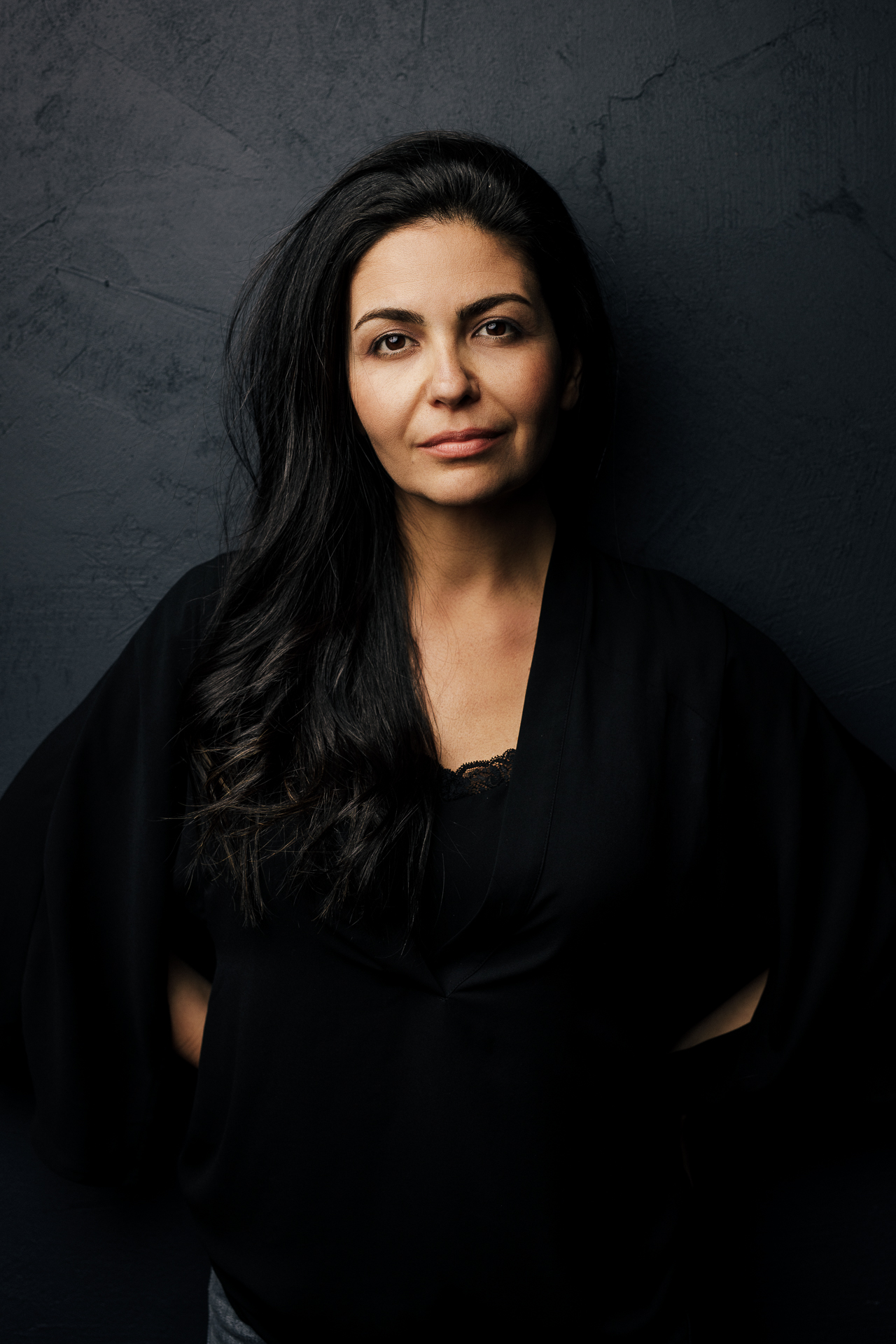
Roshi Motman

Roshi Motman is a Swedish entrepreneur and Chief Executive Officer in telecom, media and music. She was the first woman to become the CEO of Tigo, Ghana in 2014. In her current role as the CEO of Amuse, she was recognized as one of Billboard's 2024 International Power players.

== Education ==
She studied Electrical Engineering and Business Development at Chalmers University in Goteborg, Sweden.

== Career ==
Roshi Motman has about ten years experience working with various companies in the Kinnevik Group, a key investor in Millicom. She occupied the roles of Product management, Sales and Customer Operations at Tele2 in Sweden. At Tele2, she was also responsible for development of mobile entertainment at Modern Times Group, parent company of TV channel Viasat. She served as the Chief Executive Officer of Tigo, Ghana till June 2018 to pursue new opportunities

Motman was appointed CEO of Amuse in 2022, a global music company offering digital music distribution, artist-related services, financing and licensing agreements to independent and DIY artists. She was also one of the company's first angel investors back in 2016. Under Motman's leadership, Amuse's turnover and income have increased significantly, with reduced losses, and grown into one of the top 5 largest DIY distributors globally by market share (2023). She was recognized as one of Billboard’s 2024 International Power Players for her work to support a new generation of independent stars.

== Awards and recognition ==
- Roshi won the 2015 COM World Series AfricanCom Awards for CEO of the year in 2015.
- She was recognized as a trailblazer at the 5th Ghana Telcom Awards in May 2015.
- She claimed the second spot on Ledarnas list of influential female leaders in 2015.
- She was ranked among 2016’s Top 50 Corporate Women Leaders in Ghana.
- She was recognized as one of Billboard’s 2024 International Power Players.
