= New Guy (song) =

Single by Sarkodie featuring Ace Hood
- Released: 10 June 2015
- Recorded: 2015
- Genre: African hip hop; hip hop
- Length: 4:12
- Label: Sarkcess Music; Ivy League
- Songwriters: Michael Owusu Addo; Antoine McColister
- Producer: CedSolo

Sarkodie singles chronology
"Dumsor" (2015)	"New Guy" (2015)	"Ghetto" (2016)

Ace Hood singles chronology
"New Guy" (2015)	"4 a Minute" (2015)

"New Guy" is a song recorded by Ghanaian rapper Sarkodie featuring American hip pop artist Ace Hood. Although intended to be included on his first live album, Mary (2015), the inclusion was ultimately scrapped. It was released for digital consumption on 10 June 2015 through Sarkcess Music and Ivy League Records. Written by the two artists and produced by CedSolo, "New Guy" is an African hip hop and hip hop song that contains alternating rap verses, while its lyrics deal with Sarkodie's desire and motivation for success.

After its release, "New Guy" received a mixed response from music critics. Some argued that the artists' rapping abilities were impressive, while others found its production to be too noisy. An accompanying music video for the track was released on 14 June of the same year and directed by Justin Campos. The clip displays the duo performing the track in various rooms with dark scenery and ends with them approaching the outside world.

== Background and composition ==
Development for "New Guy" began in early 2015 when Sarkodie paid a total of $25,000 to cover the production fees associated with recording. He also wanted American musician Ace Hood to appear on the track because he considered him "one of the world's most powerful rappers". A sneak peek of both the song and its official music video were shared with the public on 15 May 2015 via Ghanaian music website NYDJLive.com. According to Ebenezer Donkoh from the aforementioned website, the single was extremely sought after by radio stations shortly after being available for digital consumption. "New Guy" was originally intended to be a part of the track listing for his first live album, Mary (2015), but its inclusion never occurred. Sarkodie reflected on the unexpected success of "New Guy":

That is one of my biggest records ever, hype-wise, the music itself, I love it to the core. I don't do songs thinking this has to be a hit. I do music based on how I feel from my heart and that is typically New Guy. New Guy is like a heart fulfilling type of record and to me, I think it actually hit the major impact that I wanted it to hit and people are loving it . My fans love it.

An African hip hop and hip hop song, the track was written by the two musicians while production was handled by disc jockey CedSolo. The recording lyrically finds Sarkodie discussing that he's the "new guy" in the music industry. "New Guy" displays Sarkodie and Ace Hood alternate verses atop several synth chords and military drum-like sounds, which drew comparisons to the works of the track's producer, CedSolo. Sarkodie sings during the track's refrain: "Ace, let me take you to Africa / My people, they'll love you". He also believes that his music is for the Ghanaian people and has the motivation to become a leader in the industry: "So I grind Sunday to Monday / Because there's no role models, there's no true leaders left / So it's up to me to make sure the world know that I'm that new guy / I'm that inspiration".

== Critical reception ==
"New Guy" received a mixed response from music critics. Jimmy King from tooXclusive claimed that Sarkodie "killed it with his trademark fast rap" and concluded with: "'New Guy' is a song you should have on your playlist." Ovie O. from NotJustOk claimed that the track proves that Sarkodie is "better than your best African rapper". KC Roberts from Hip Hop Honesty furthered the praise for the singer having his "own style and sense of deliverability"; he also predicted it to be successful in the United States and compared it to several songs on American rapper DJ Khaled's second studio album, We the Best (2007). David Mawuli from Pulse awarded the single four out of five stars and declared "New Guy" to be extremely impressive. Multi Media Outfit Luv FM, a radio station in Ghana, reported that "New Guy" was too loud: "It's either I'm not good at appreciating rap music or Sarkodie's new song [...] is just noise." She concluded by saying that she does not qualify that as music.

== Music video ==
An accompanying music video for "New Guy" was released on 14 June 2015 through Sarkodie's official YouTube account; a sneak peek of the video's production was released one month prior to create hype for its release. It was directed by Justin Campos from Gorilla Films, while its production was administered by his wife, Candice Lee Campos. Much like the song, the two singers take turns performing their verses while standing in dark-coloured rooms. Ace Hood appears without a shirt and stands next to Sarkodie while visual of female dancers performing choreography are randomly displayed. Towards the end of the video, they appear outside wearing black and white suits; Sarkodie's T-shirt from earlier is shown and displays: "They got money for wars but can't feed the poor", which is a lyric from 2Pac's 1993 single "Keep Ya Head Up".
