= Magnom =

Ghanaian record producer

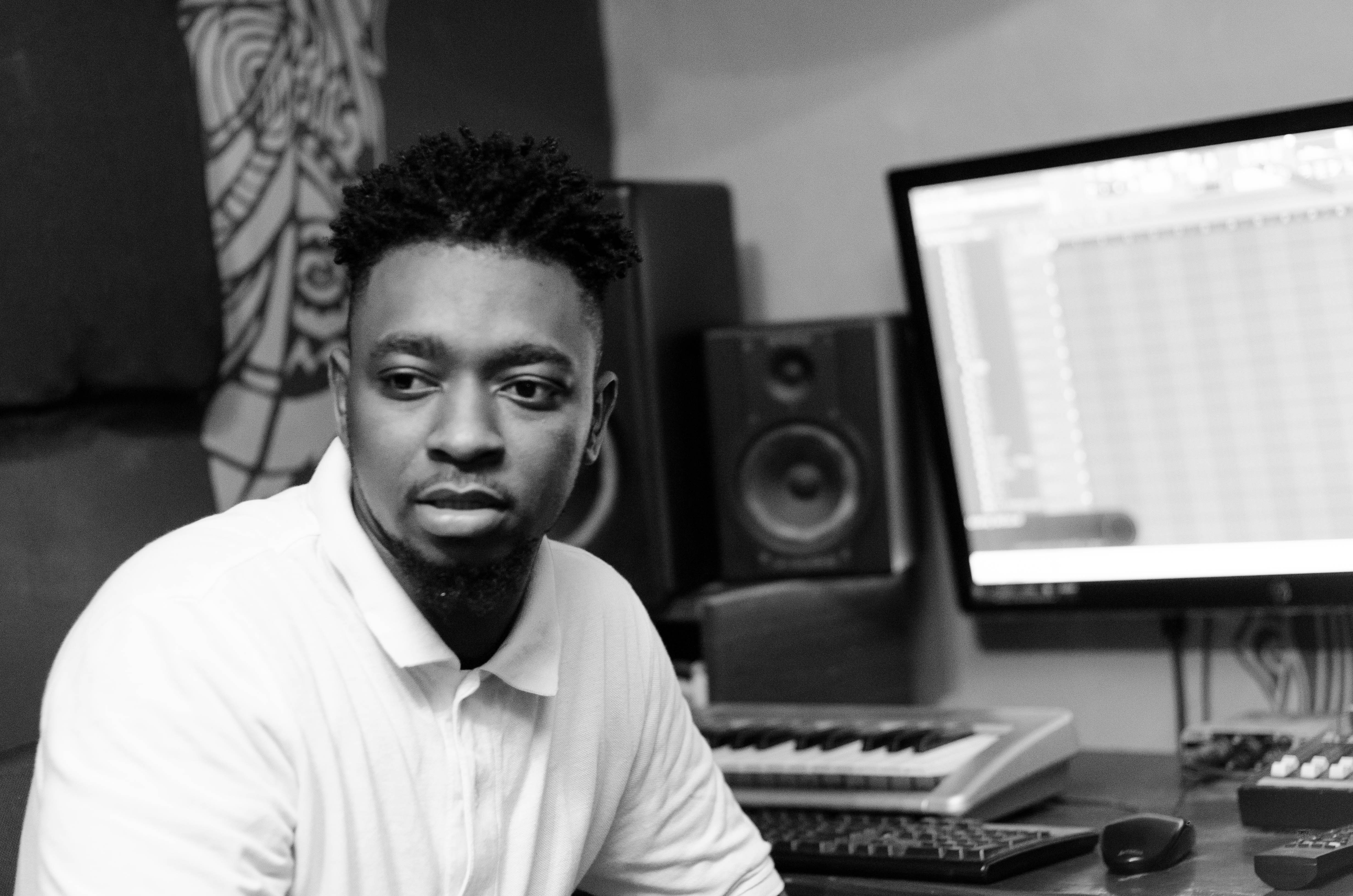
- Record producer Magnom in his studio working.

Background information
- Also known as: Magnom Beats
- Born: Joseph Bulley; Accra, Ghana
- Origin: Volta Region, Ghana
- Genres: Afro pop; Hip hop; Dancehall; Afrobeats
- Occupations: record producer, sound engineer, recording artist
- Instrument: Piano
- Years active: 2009–present
- Labels: Oovadrive Music

Joseph Bulley, known professionally as Magnom, is a Ghanaian record producer and recording artist, who produces music ranging from Hiphop, dancehall, and Afrobeats. He gained the attention of Ghanaians after he produced the song "illuminati" with Ghanaian BET award winner Sarkodie.

== Early life ==
Magnom grew up around a dad who listened to all genres of music, which helped him in his love for music. He started out as a rapper in a group with fellow rapper Asem, but he quit rap for record production. During that period he came across a Digital Audio Workstation and realised he could actually create music with it. Magnom attended Christ The King for his junior high school education. He had his secondary education at St. Peters Senior High School and later obtained his Bachelor of Arts (BA) degree from the University of Ghana, Legon where he studied psychology, linguistics and religion.

== Career ==
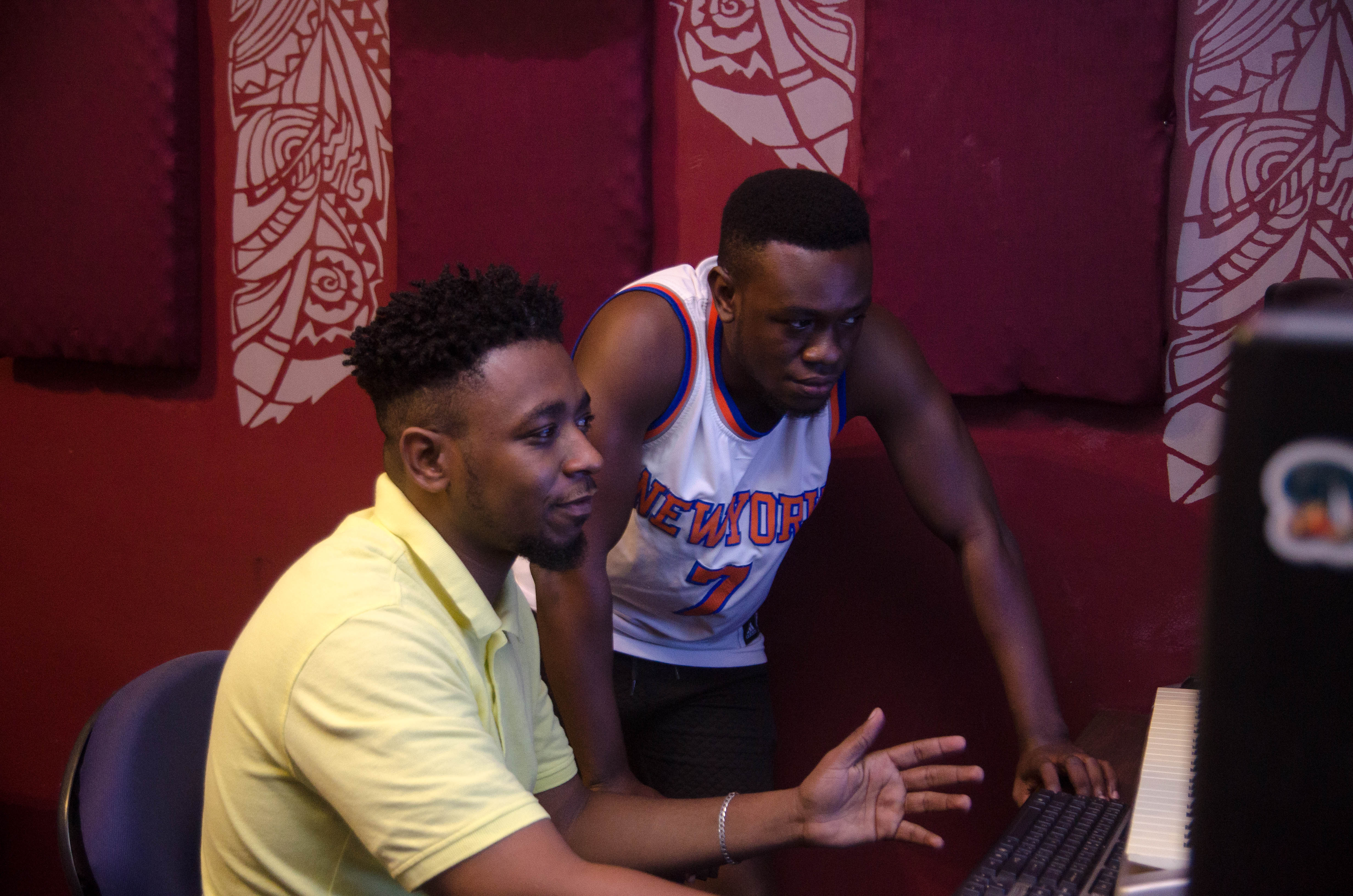
Magnom in his studio

Magnom started working professionally while he was in the university and through working with Asem he later got introduced to other mainstream artistes in Ghana. Since then he has worked with several top artistes such as Sarkodie, VVIP, Samini, Edem, Raquel, Guru, 2face Idibia, Shaker, Flowking Stone, Asem, Popcaan, and other musicians. He was nominated for Producer of the Year at the 2015 Vodafone Ghana Music Awards for his production on Edem's hit song "Koene".

== Tours and notable performances ==
On 31 December 2017 Magnom made his first performance outside Ghana at Kigali, Rwanda. He performed at Roc NYE Celebrations on New Year's Eve at Kigali Serena Hotel. Magnom referred to Kigali as his second home after his performance.

== Discography ==
As lead artist
Year	Title	Album
2013	"Akpanga"(featuring Looney, Gasmilla, Shaker, Laylow)	Non-album single
2013	"Jam Jam" (featuring Joey B, Dampoo, Medal, Shaker, Edem, Pappy Kojo)	Non-album single
2013	"Kpa" (featuring Castro)	Non-album single
2016	"Too Fine"	Non-album single

=== Production discography ===
Year	Artiste	Album
2014	Sarkodie	Sarkology
2014	Edem	Books and Rhymes
2015	Asem	Tough Time Don't Last
2016	Flowking Stone	Gifted

== Awards/nominations ==
Year	Event	Prize	Recipient	Result	Ref
2015	2015 Vodafone Ghana Music Awards	Producer of the Year	Himself	Nominated	
