= Mary (Sarkodie album) =

- Sarkodie's Grandmother "Mary"

Live album by Sarkodie
- Released: September 12, 2015
- Recorded: 2013–15
- Genre: Highlife, hiplife
- Label: Sarkcess Music
- Producer: Sarkodie (exec.), Akwaboah

Sarkodie chronology
Sarkology (2014)	Mary (2015)	Highest (2017)

Singles from Mary
- 1. "Mewu" Released: July 10, 2015

Mary is a live album by Ghanaian rapper Sarkodie. It is the rapper's fourth overall album and the follow-up to his third studio album, Sarkology (2014). The album was released through his imprint Sarkcess Music. It is dedicated to his grandmother who died in 2012. As the executive producer of his project, Sarkodie enlisted musician Akwaboah to produce and write the album. Mary features guest appearances from Akwaboah, Efya, Mugeez, Obrafour and Chase. The record differs from Sarkodie's previous releases in that it primarily features live instrumentation and heavily incorporates elements of highlife music.

== Background ==
Mary is named after Sarkodie's late Grandmother, who wanted him to record live music. He took two years to record the album. Sarkodie worked closely with producer Akwaboah on the LP. In a Facebook post in December 2014, he revealed the album's cover art and said he didn't tweet or talked about it because he needed time and a sound mind to record. Producer Akwaboah told Pulse Ghana that the album will comprise 10 songs, including "Success Story", "End Up Falling", "All In You" and "Giant Steps". He also said he wrote eight songs on the album.

== Track listing ==
1. "Wanna Be Loved" featuring Efya
2. "Giant Steps" featuring Chase
3. "Mewu" featuring Akwaboah
4. "Always On My Mind" featuring Obrafour
5. "Bra" featuring Pat Thomas
6. "Nobody's Business" featuring Akwaboah
7. "All Is You" featuring Mugeez
8. "End Up Falling" featuring Akwaboah
9. "Edwom tesen"
10. "Mary"
11. "Sarkcess Story" featuring Efya
