= E.L (rapper) =

Ghanaian rapper

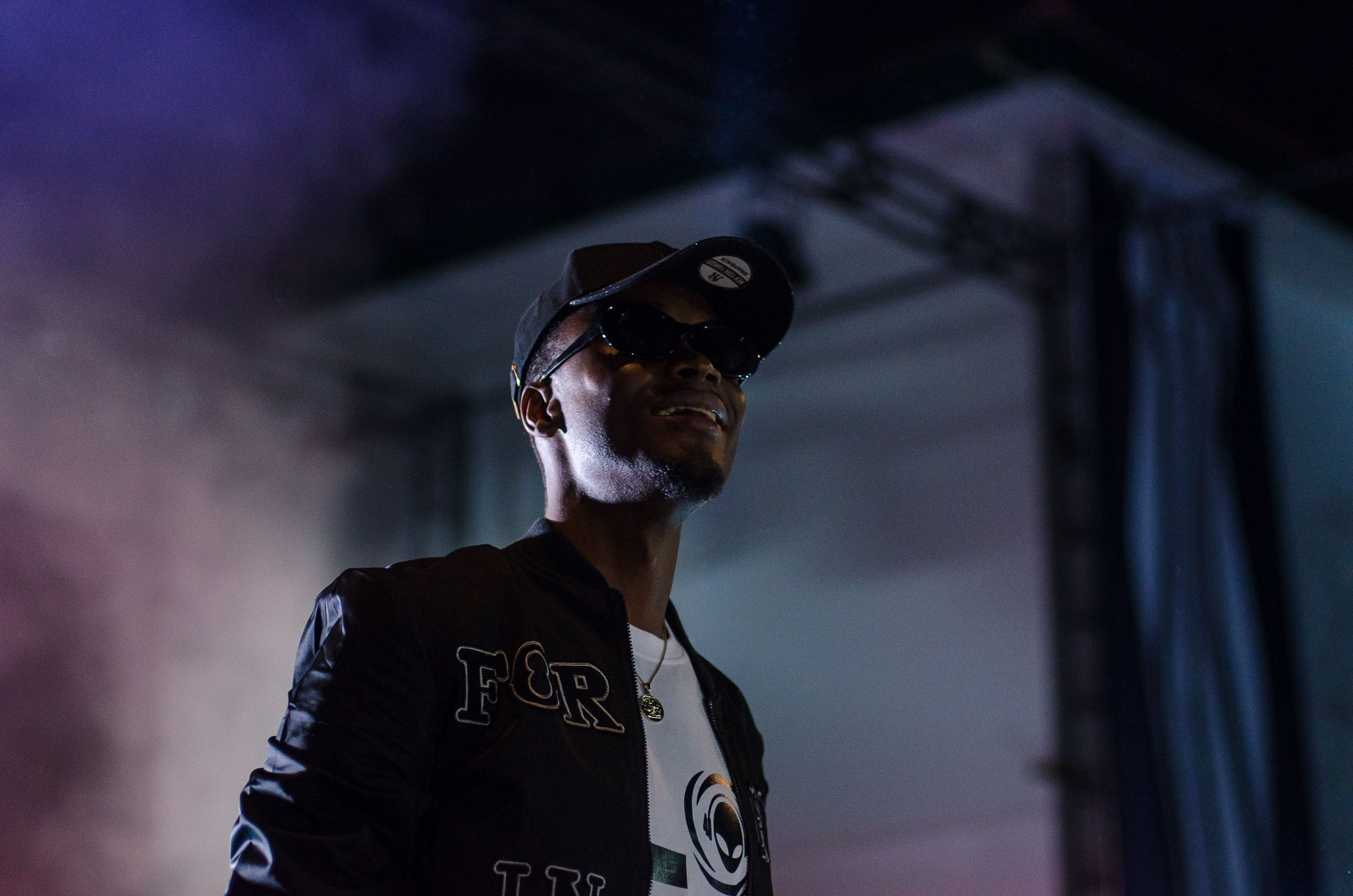

Background information
- Born: Elom Adablah; 28 June 1989 (age 37); Dansoman, Accra, Ghana
- Genres: Afrobeats, Hip-Hop, Hiplife, Azonto, Afropop
- Occupations: Musician, rapper, singer, producer
- Instruments: Keyboard, sampler
- Years active: 2008–present
- Labels: Skillions Records, BBnZ Live

Elom Adablah (born 28 June 1989), better known by his stage name E.L, is a Ghanaian Afrobeats musician, rapper, singer and producer.

E.L's singles include "Obuu Mo", "Kaalu", "One Ghana", "Auntie Martha", "Shelele", "Mi Naa Bo Po", "Koko" and "KaaBuAme", "See me Sometime", "Abaa" and "Pay Like a Boss". His debut album was Something Else (2012). E.L released a mixtape he calls The BAR (Best African Rapper) and in 2017, he released the fourth one called BAR IV.

He won Artiste of the Year and Hiplife/Hip-Hop Artiste of the Year at the 2015/2016 Vodafone Ghana Music Awards.

== Early life ==
E.L grew up in Dansoman, a suburb of Accra. He first attended St. Martin De Porres School in Dansoman and later transferred to Jack and Jill School in Roman Ridge where he completed his Junior Secondary School education. He then gained admission into Presbyterian Boys Secondary School (PRESEC) Legon, where he discovered music. After secondary school, he pursued a degree in economics and political science at the University of Ghana, Legon.

== Personal life ==
E.L. is currently single and has no children. His net worth is estimated to be $700,000.

== Music career ==
=== 2008: Music beginnings ===
During his first year in the university, E.L. signed to Jayso's Skillions Records and helped Jayso co-produce the Skillionaires Demotape. However, after graduating from university, the Skillions broke up and E.L. became a solo artist. He acquired a studio in Asylum Down and began working on a new mixtape. He then released a single titled, "Chale (So Fli)", with Jay Foley, Wolf and Kwaku T (remix). However, the mixtape was never released. E.L. relocated to a better studio in Osu, and invested all his available funds in acquiring equipment.

=== 2009–2012: Something Else ===
EL got signed to BBnZ Live His debut double album, Something Else, was released on 1st June 2012 by Akwaaba Music, and is a blend of different varieties of music inspired from various sources.

=== 2014: The B.A.R Mixtape ===
E.L. released The Best African Rapper album, shortened as The B.A.R on 20th May 2014. It featured Ayigbe Edem, Sarkodie, Joey B, C-Real, Gemini, Telvin, Frozen, Lil Shaker, Stargo, P. K. and Dex Kwasi.

=== 2015: B.A.R 2 ===
E.L. announced he was working on B.A.R 2, releasing the cover art and later releasing three songs "All Black", "State of the Nation" and "King Without A Crown". On 29 August 2015, he followed up with the B.A.R 2 Concert featuring Wanlov, Ko-Jo Cue, DJ Mic Smith and more.

=== 2016: Elom ===
E.L. released his second studio album entitled Elom (Everybody loves original music). The album included singles "Mi Naa Bo Po", "Watch The Way You Dey Waka" and "Nkrumah Pt. 2" featuring Obrafour.

On 15 April 2016 Lauryn Hill headlined a concert dubbed Ms. Lauryn Hill Presents Diaspora Calling! in association with Tidal at Kings Theater, the concert was intended to celebrate the rich tapestry of artists from the African Diaspora and included E.L and Stonebwoy from Ghana, also Wondaboy and Mr. Eazi from Nigeria.

=== 2017: B.A.R 4 ===
The success of the previous installment of the B.A.R franchise saw the birth of another mixtape. This featured established rappers and also included rising rappers such as Teephlow, Kojo-Cue, and Medikal. One notable track on the album is "Nina", which is a song about a psychopathic groupie. Other hard core rap songs as "Change", "Superstar", and "Lalafalama" were also lauded; as was "Bars".

=== 2018: B.A.R V ===
E.L. released his fifth studio album titled BAR V (stylised as BVR), a 15 track album. It included rap singles like "Nobody", "The Greatest", and "Thinkin'." E.L. featured Nigerian artiste, Falz, and Ghanaian acts Akan and Bryan The Mensah.

=== 2019: The Linkop - E.L. & AI ===
This was a joint album with another Ghanaian musician, Ayisi - AI. This was the first time E.L. released a joint album. However, this was the second notable joint album to be released in Ghana, with Sarkodie (rapper) and Jayso's TMG being the first. The Linkop album came to be after the excellent chemistry generated from their collaboration on the "Adwuma" song. This album has seven tracks ranging from Afrobeats to Dancehall and Reggae fusion. One track which seems to appeal to the masses is "For 2".

=== 2020: Songs For Girls 3 EP ===
This featured seven songs of different genres.

=== 2020: Leaks1 ===
The beginning of the new decade saw E.L. drop a series of projects – few singles and two different tapes; the first of which was Leaks1. This featured talented rappers even as they were not well-known. One of such rappers is Yung Pabi whom he featured on the song titled Respect. This album had three songs.

=== 2020: Leaks2 ===
Just as the previous tape before this, it had three tracks. Interesting tracks as they are, some industry pundits/critics labelled as masterpieces. Most prominent track was Track 3 - J.J. Rawlings which featured friend and frequent collaborator Gemini Orleans.

== Notable productions ==
EL has produced songs for many hip hop, hiplife and R&B performers, such as:

- Sarkodie ("You Go Kill Me", "Dangerous") in collaboration with krynk man
- Keche ("Sokode") in collaboration with krynk man
- D-Black ("Get On the Dancefloor")
- D-Black ft D Cryme("Change your life")
- Donaeo Ft E.L ("Life Saver")
- T Blaze ("Aso wo ha")
- C-Real ft E.L ("Weytin De Happen") (sexy mama)
- C-Real ft E.L ("Do the Azonto")
- Lighter ft Promzy of VIP and E.L ("Fear of my Life")
- Scientific ft Sarkodie and E.L ("I Like You Girl")
- J Town ft D Cyrme and E.L ("Party Alhaji")
- Sala ft E.L ("Only You")
- Samini ("Too Bad")
- Edem ("Wey tin")
- Efya ft E.L ("Heartbeat")
- Efya ft Mugeez ("Ooh Ooh Ooh")
- Reggie Rockstone ("Rockstone's Office"), Asem ("Check Your Weight"), Geelex ("Bend Your Body") and many more.
- Joey B ft E.L ("Wow").
- E.L Ft. DopeNation – Ayeyi (Prod. By PeeOnTheBeatz)
- E.L – Vim Yaazo (Prod. by E.L)
- E.L – Joy (Prod. by Kuzie x E.L)

== Discography ==
Studio albums

- Something Else (2012)
- ELOM (2016)
- B.A.R. 3: The Lomi Era (2016)
- B.A.R 4 (2017)
- BVR (2018)
- B.A.R 6 (2021)
- B.A.R 7 (2024)

Mixtapes

- Project Hip Hop (with C-Real) (2011)
- Songs for Girls-the Valentines Day Mixtape (2012)
- The B.A.R. (2014)
- Project Hip Hop 2 (with C-Real) (2015)
- B.A.R. 2 (2015)
- B.A.R. 3 (2016)
- Songs for Girls Vol. 1
- Songs for Girls Vol. 2

== Singles ==
- One Ghana- August 2011
- Obuu Mo- September 2011
- Ma Me Wassop- December 2011
- Turn the Lights Down- December 2011
- Lifesaver ft Donaeo- January 2012
- The Botos Song ft (N-Dex & J-Town)- February 2012
- Nigg*s in Accra (Azonto RMX) ft C-Real & Stargo- April 2012
- The ChO.sen ft (Manifest, D-Black & Sarkodie)- October 2012
- Hallelujah ft (M.anifest)- December 2012
- No Size- December 2013
- See Me Suffer ft (Shaker)- October 2013
- Ayayaa- March 2014
- My Friend- April 2014
- Boorle- September 2014
- Sister Araba- December 2014
- Agbadza- December 2014
- State of the Nation Address- March 2015
- Shelele- March 2015
- Egbefia- April 2015
- Mi Naa Bo Po- August 2015
- Koko- November 2015
- Pour Put Inside- December 2015
- Fire Cant Cool- May 2016
- Portray Dey Be- December 2015
- Kaa Bu Ame- June 2016
- Lalafalama- September 2016
- Fefeefe- November 2017
- Agbo- February 2017
- Eliens Anthem- March 2017
- Explain-March 2017
- Pay like a Boss-September 2017
- Overdose-October 2017
- Joy-February 2018
- Wosa ft Joey B - June 2018
- FWY-May 2018
- Efa Wo Ho Ben December-2-2019
- Baba Dey 2021

== Videography ==
2017	Mi Naa Bo Po	Phamous Philms
2016	Lalafalama	Pascal AKA
Year	Title	Director
2016	Fefeefe	XBILLZ
Year	Title	Director
2017	See Me Sometime	N/A
Year	Title	Director
2017	Mi Naa Bo Po	Phamous Philms
Year	Title	Director
2017	Abaa	Phamous Philms
Year	Title	Director
2017	See Me Sometime	WOWA

== Awards and nominations ==
- 2010 Africa Movie Academy Awards:Best Original Soundtrack 'A sting in a tale'
- 2010 Ghana Movie Awards: Best Score Award, Checkmate And more
- 2011 Ghana Music Awards: Hip-hop Song of the Year award, "Get On the Dance Floor", Producer
- 2012/2013 Ghana Music Awards Album of the Year
- 2015/2016 Vodafone Ghana Music Awards Hip-life/Hip-hop Artiste of the year
- 2015/2016 Vodafone Ghana Music Awards Artiste of the Year
- 2016 Ghana Music Awards UK Artiste of the Year
- 2015/2016 Ghana Music Awards Producer Of the Year
- 2015/2016 Ghana Music Awards Afro pop song Of the Year
- 2016/2017 Ghana Music Awards Afro Pop Song Of The Year (Kaa Bu Ame)
- 2017 Ghana Entertainment Awards - USA Best Album (BAR 3)

== Video awards ==
- 2013 MTN 4Syte TV Music Video Awards: Best Photography
- 2014 MTN 4Syte TV Music Video Awards: Best Storyline
- 2015 MTN 4Syte TV Music Video Awards: Best Edited Video and Best special effect
- 2015/2016 Vodafone Ghana Music Awards Music Video of the Year(Shelele)
- 2017 4SYTE MVA BEST EDITED VIDEO

== Nominations ==
- 2012 Ghana Music Awards: Best New Artist, Best Rapper, Best Collaboration ("You Go Kill Me" with Sarkodie)
- 2012 Channel O Music Video Awards: Best Newcomer ("Turn The Lights Down")
- MTV Africa Music Awards 2016 – Listener's Choice
