= Sarkology =

Studio album by Sarkodie
- Released: January 2, 2014
- Recorded: 2012–13
- Genre: Hip hop; hiplife
- Length: 115:00
- Language: Twi; English
- Label: Duncwills Entertainment
- Producer: Hammer; Magnom; Killbeatz; Beat Merchant; King of Accra; Lil Shaker; Masterkraft; Nshona; Silvastone

Sarkodie chronology
T.M.G (2013)	Sarkology (2014)	Mary (2015)

Singles from Sarkology
- 1. "Gunshot" Released: November 12, 2012; 2. "Illuminati" Released: November 27, 2012; 3. "Lies" Released: May 8, 2013; 4. "Bounce" Released: September 19, 2013; 5. "Down on One" Released: October 10, 2013; 6. "Pon D Ting" Released: December 23, 2013; 7. "Ordinary Love" Released: December 31, 2013; 8. "Preach" Released: January 9, 2014

Sarkology is the third studio album by Ghanaian rapper Sarkodie. It was released by Duncwills Entertainment on January 2, 2014. Recorded in English and Twi, the album features guest appearances from Fuse ODG, Davido, Tiwa Savage, Banky W., Timaya, 2 Face Idibia, Efya, Mugeez, Obrafour, Burna Boy, Vivian Chidid, Vector, Silvastone, SK Blinks, Stonebwoy, Joey B, J Town, Lil Shaker, Raquel, Sian, Kofi B and AKA. Its production was handled by Magnom, Hammer, KillBeatz, Masterkraft, and Silvastone, among others.

== Background and promotion ==
Sarkology was rumored to be a 16-track album that would be release towards the end of 2013. According to The Ghanaian Chronicle, Sarkodie told the press that Sarkology would contain 30 songs and would feature production from 13 producers, including KillBeatz, Magnom and Nshorna. On August 28, 2013, Sarkodie released the album's cover art to the general public while he was in the United Kingdom for a video shoot. The cover features a young boy surrounded by school textbooks and other educational materials. Sarkodie utilized the cover art to promote his clothing brand, Sark.

On December 21, 2013, the Accra Sports Stadium hosted the Sarkology Release Concert, which served as a promotional event for Sarkology. The concert featured additional performances from Stay Jay, Kwaw Kese, Efya, Fuse ODG, Joey B, Raquel, Ephraim, Donzy, Dee Moneey, Buda, Mr. Silver, Phoot Printz and Scizo.

== Singles ==
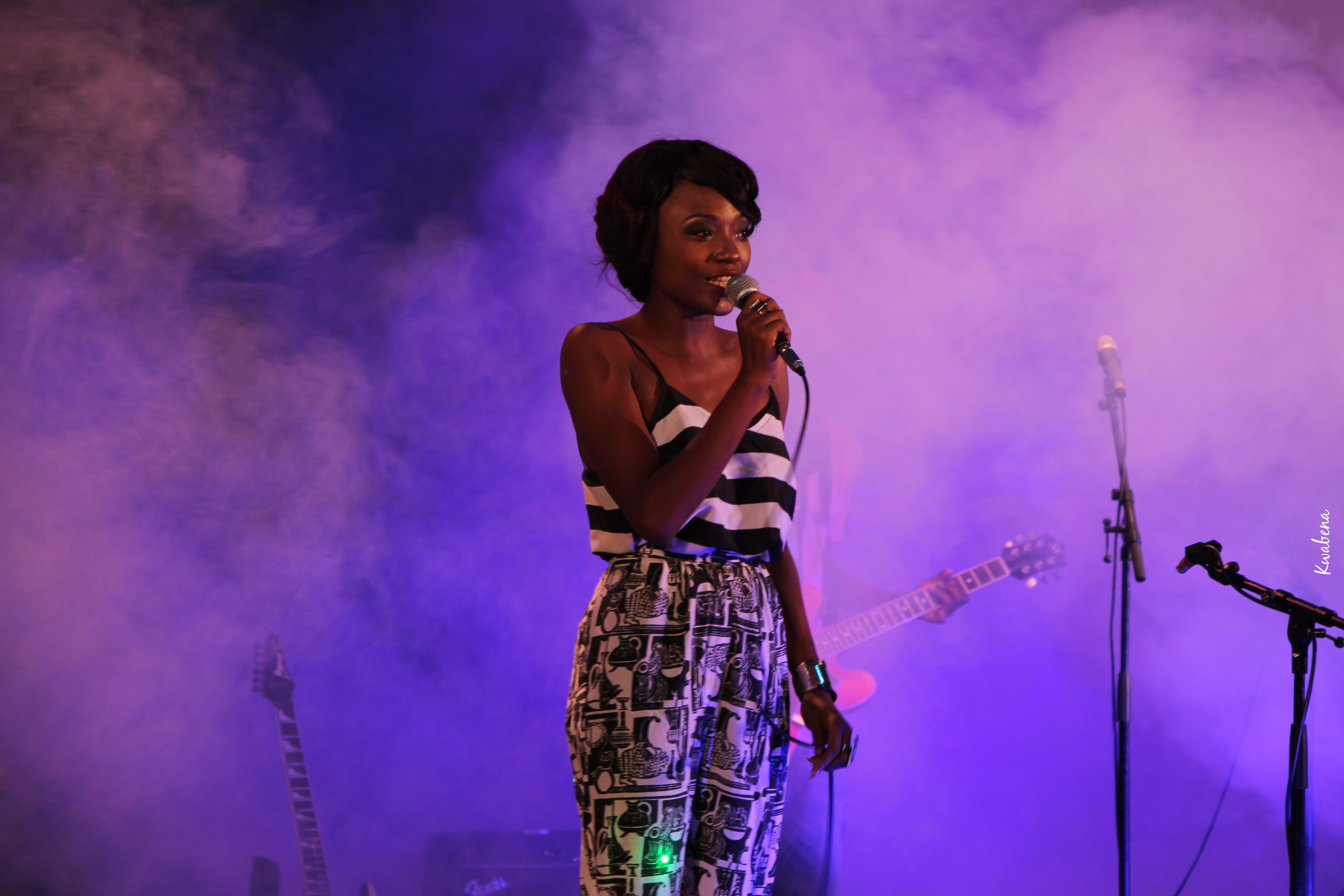
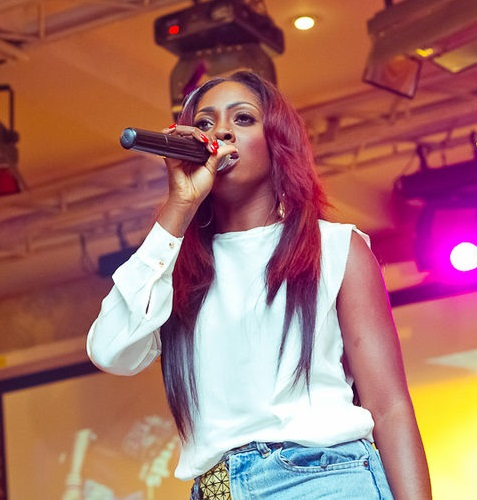
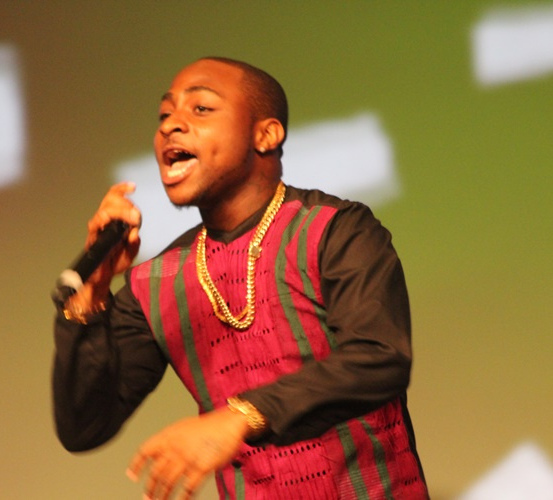
Efya (top) lent vocals to two tracks. Tiwa Savage (middle) and Davido (bottom) are two of the seven Nigerian musicians featured on the album.

The album's lead single, "Gunshot", was released on November 12, 2012. It features guest vocals by Nigerian singer Davido and was produced by KillBeatz. The Sesan-directed video for "Gunshot" was released on December 11, 2012. The album's second single, "Illuminati", was released on November 27, 2012. The song was produced by Magnom and recorded in Twi and English. Its music video was directed by Gyogyimah of Phamous Philms and recorded in Dubai at various locations. After releasing "Illuminati", Sarkodie was jokingly rumored to have joined the "secret clan".

The Lil Shaker-assisted track "Lies" was released on May 8, 2013, as the album's third single.The accompanying music video for the song was directed by Nana-Asi Hene. According to OkayAfrica, the visuals "juggle images of a broken mannequin/past lover to the backdrop of Sarkodie's flashy whips, mansions, pools and penthouses." The album's fourth single, "Bounce", was released on September 19, 2013. The song's music video was directed by Sesan. "Down on One" was released as the album's fifth single on October 10, 2013; the song features vocals by Fuse ODG and was produced by Killbeatz. The music video for "Down on One" was recorded by Moe Musa.

The album's sixth single, "Pon D Ting", was released on December 23, 2013. It features guest vocals by Banky W. and was produced by Masterkraft. The music video for "Pon D Ting" was filmed during Sarkodie's trip to South Africa for the 2013 Channel O Music Video Awards. On December 31, 2013, Sarkodie released "Ordinary Love" as the album's seventh single. It was produced by Beat Merchant and features vocals by Tiwa Savage. Efya was initially intended to be on the track, but Sarkodie ended up contacting Savage because he wanted something different.

The album's eighth single, "Preach", was released on January 9, 2014. The song includes a rap verse by UK-based artist and record producer Silvastone. The music video for "Preach" was released on February 3, 2014 and uploaded to YouTube.

== Composition ==
"Elijah" includes a rap verse by Obrafour; The Native's Emmanuel Esomnofu called the song "zesty" and said its "calculated verses are blended with a poignant hook". In "Original", Sarkodie addresses people's worries that rapping in his native tongue may restrict him; the song is driven by a loud beat and jubilant synths. "Special Someone" features vocals by Burna Boy and a rap verse by AKA. Esomnofu commended the song for being "impressively tender, drawing from the soft nucleus of R&B while brazenly adapting the breezy cadences of rap within the verses".

The SK Blinks-assisted track "Adonai" blends rap music with religious themes; the song's rhythm is percussion-based. The church-inspired track "Devil In Me" features vocals by Efya. Esomnofu praised Efya's vocal performance and likened the track to M.I Abaga's "Imperfect Me", which appeared on MI 2: The Movie (2010).

== Critical reception ==
Sarkology received generally positive reviews from music critics. Jacob Roberts-Mensah and Ameyaw Debrah awarded the album 9 stars out of 10, commending Sarkodie for "blurring the lines between hiplife and hip-hop without necessarily being boxed in or defined by either genre". The Native's Emmanuel Esomnofu considers Sarkology to be "an important African rap album" and said its "impact trumps its quality".

=== Accolades ===
Sarkology won Album of the Year at the 2014 Ghana Music Awards and was nominated for World's Best Album at the 2014 World Music Awards.

== Track listing ==
No.	Title	Writer(s)	Producer(s)	Length
1.	"Dear Rap"	Michael Owusu Addo	Fortune Dane	2:22
2.	"Elijah" (featuring Obrafour)	Addo; Michael Elliot Darko	Hammer	5:16
3.	"Halleluyah" (featuring Vivian Chidid)	Addo; Vivian Chidid	Wonda Music	4:00
4.	"Illuminati"	Michael Owusu Addo	Magnom	2:46
5.	"Rap Attack" (featuring Vector)	Addo; Olanrewaju Ogunmefun	KillBeatz	3:59
6.	"Sizeless" (Skit)		—	1:26
7.	"Original"	Addo	Fortune Dane	4:07
8.	"Xxl" (featuring Mugeez)	Addo; Rashid Mugeez	Fortune Dane	3:49
9.	"Preach" (featuring Silvastone)	Addo; Silvastone	Silvastone	4:11
10.	"Y'all Already Know"	Michael Owusu Addo	King of Accra	3:05
11.	"Pon D Ting" (featuring Banky W.)	Addo; Olubankole Wellington	Masterkraft	4:11
12.	"Special Someone" (featuring Burna Boy and AKA)	Addo; Damini Ogulu; Kiernan Forbes	Jayso	4:18
13.	"Down on One" (featuring Fuse ODG)	Addo; Nana Richard Abiona	KillBeatz	3:47
14.	"One Chance" (featuring Timaya)	Addo; Inetimi Alfred Odon	KillBeatz	4:04
15.	"Gunshot" (featuring Davido)	Addo; David Adeleke	KillBeatz	3:51
16.	"Wobaadanaa"	Michael Owusu Addo	Lil Shaker	4:13
17.	"Adonai" (featuring Sk Blinks)	Addo; Sk Blinks	Nshona Muzick	4:02
18.	"Bounce"	Michael Owusu Addo	Magnom	3:45
19.	"Currency" (featuring Stonebwoy)	Addo; Livingston E. Satekla	Magnom	4:46
20.	"2 Paddies" (featuring Joey B)	Addo; Darryl Bannerman-Martin	Magnom	3:08
21.	"Good Relationship" (featuring J Town)	Addo; Stefen Menson; Michael Owusu Addo	Magnom	3:47
22.	"Lies" (featuring Lil Shaker)	Addo; Lil Shaker	Lil Shaker	3:58
23.	"Ordinary Love" (featuring Tiwa Savage)	Addo; Tiwatope Savage	Beat Merchant	3:30
24.	"Hold On" (featuring Raquel)	Addo; Raquel Ammah	Lil Shaker	4:18
25.	"Marry Me" (featuring Sian)	Addo; Sian		3:53
26.	"Odo Yede" (featuring Kofi B)	Addo; Kofi Boakye		3:34
27.	"Whatever You Do" (featuring Efya)	Addo; Jane Fara Awindor
28.	"War" (featuring 2Face Idibia)	Addo; Innocent Ujah Idibia	Magnom	3:28
29.	"Small Small" (featuring Lil Shaker)	Addo; Lil Shaker	Lil Shaker	4:40
30.	"Devil in Me" (featuring Efya)	Addo; Jane Fara Awindor		4:33
Total length:				115:00

Notes

- "—" denotes a skit

== Personnel ==
- Michael Owusu Addo – primary artist
- Nana Richard Abiona – featured artist
- David Adeleke – featured artist
- Tiwatope Savage Balogun – featured artist
- Darryl Bannerman-Martin – featured artist
- Olubankole Wellington – featured artist
- Enetimi Alfred Odom – featured artist
- Innocent Ujah Idibia – featured artist
- Jane Fara Awindor – featured artist
- Rashid Mugeez – featured artist
- Michael Elliot – featured artist
- Damini Ogulu – featured artist
- Vivian Chidid – featured artiste
- Olanrewaju Ogunmefun – featured artist
- Silvastone – producer, featured artist
- SK Blinks – featured artist
- Livingston E. Satekla – composer
- Stefen Menson – featured artist
- Stonebwoy – featured artist
- Raquel Ammah – composer
- Raquel – featured artist
- Sian – featured artist
- Kofi Boakye – featured artist
- Kiernan Forbes – featured artist
- Lil Shaker – producer, featured artist
- Hammer – producer
- Magnom – producer
- Hammer – producer
- Killbeatz – producer
- King of Accra – producer
- Masterkraft – producer
- RedEye – mixing, mastering

== Release history ==
Region	Date	Format	Label
Ghana	January 2, 2014	CD, Digital download	Duncwills Entertainment
