= MOG Music =

Ghanaian singer

- Born: Nana Yaw Boakye
- Genres: Gospel
- Occupation(s): Singer, songwriter
- Years active: 2013–present

Nana Yaw Boakye better known by his stage name MOG Music is a Ghanaian contemporary gospel singer, songwriter and a Pastor. He was born on May 14. He won the Male Vocalist of the Year 2020 and 2021 at the Vodafone Ghana Music Awards.

== Music career ==
MOG Music released his debut album "New Wine" in 2016 which earned him African Gospel Music awards nominations for "Album of the Year" and "Discovery of the Year". He released a single "Making it Big" featuring Sarkodie.

He has collaborated and performed with numerous gospel musicians, including Ohemaa Mercy, Joe Mettle, Denzel Prempeh, Jekalyn Carr, Danny Nettey, Nii Okai, Ron Kenoly.

== Discography ==
=== Live albums ===
- New Wine (2016)
- Better Me (2018)

Selected singles

- Be Lifted
- Elohim
- Fakye
- Making It big
- Living God

== Awards and nomination ==
Year	Event	Award	Nominated work	Result	Ref
2021	Vodafone Ghana Music Awards	Male Vocalist of the Year	Himself	Won	
2020	Vodafone Ghana Music Awards	Male Vocalist of the Year	Himself	Won	
2019	African Gospel Music Awards	Outstanding male minister of the year	Himself	Nominated	
2019	African Gospel Music Awards	Outstanding Collaboration Song	Himself	Nominated	
2019	Contemporary Gospel Music awards	Worship Song of the Year	Himself	Won	
2023	Vodafone Ghana Music Awards	Gospel Artist of the Year	Himself	Nominated	
