= Rapperholic =

Ghanaian musical concert series hosted by Sarkodie

Rapperholic is an annual concert series that was created in 2012 organised by Ghanaian musician Sarkodie. The event was first hosted on 24 December, 2012. He set to headline the BaBa Yara Sports Stadium on 24 OCTOBER 2026 with

== History ==
Initiated in 2012 by Sarkodie, a Ghanaian rapper. The concert showcases Sarkodie's music and performances and brings people together. In 2012 he released an album titled "Rapperholic" which the album featured 18 songs. On Sunday, 28th July, 2013, the Rapperholic Concert was held at Koforidua sports stadium after it was cancelled on Saturday 27th July, 2013 which resulted in a low attendance rate.

The 2017 edition of the concert was launched at the Multichoice head office in Accra. The event took place at the Accra International Conference Centre on 25th December. Other Ghanaian musicians like Becca, Freda rhymes, Kwesi Arthur, Kidi, Adina, Obrafuor, Kurl Songx, Mugeez, Kwaw Kese, Strongman, Efya, Korede Bello and Big Shaq were present. The 2018 edition of Sarkodie’s Rapperholic concert ended with criticisms due to venue being overpacked, the concert celebrates the rapper's followers and listeners every year. M.anifest, R2Bees, Akwaboah among others showed up to perform.

Rapperholic 2019 took place at the ‘Grand Arena, AICC’ with performances from Edem, Coded of 4×4, Tulenkey, Kofi Mole, Quamina MP, Amerado, Medikal. The 2019 edition marked the show’s 7th edition since the start of the concert. The crowd in the auditorium were party crowd ready to jam to every tune that was played. The seventh (7th) edition named 'Rapperholic Unstoppable ’19' was launched at the Kwaleyz Residence in Accra.

== Rapperholic rebirth ==
The 2019 BET Hip-hop Awards, Sarkodie at the ‘Rapperholic Rebirth’ musical concert at the Grand Arena showcased his musical prowess. he seized a moment to acknowledge the absence of his late lawyer and confidante Cynthia Quarcoo. The late Cynthia Quarcoo, was a key figure in Sarkodie’s journey. In his tribute he spoke openly about the impact the late lawyer had on his career.

To celebrate the tenth year of his Rapperholic event, he initiated a week-long exhibition at the Mix Design Hub in Osu where he showcased his commitment to the industry. The exhibition reflected on Sarkodie's impact on the global music scene. The exhibition saw personalities like Dr. Osei Kwame, Dr. Ofori Sarpong, actress Nadia Buari among others.

Legendary Amakye Dede was also present for a tour with a performance. The line-up of activities included a Student Tour, a Fireside Chat, Curators Dialogue and Podcast session.

== Rapperholic 2025: The Homecoming ==
In 2025, rapperholic was hosted at Baba Yara Sports Stadium, kumasi, the rapper paid a courtesy call to the Asantehene, Otumfuo Osei Tutu II which he later organized a health walk. Sarkodie also shared his wishlist of performers he is willing to bring on rapperholic 2026.
