= Jayso =

Ghanaian musical artist (born 1983)

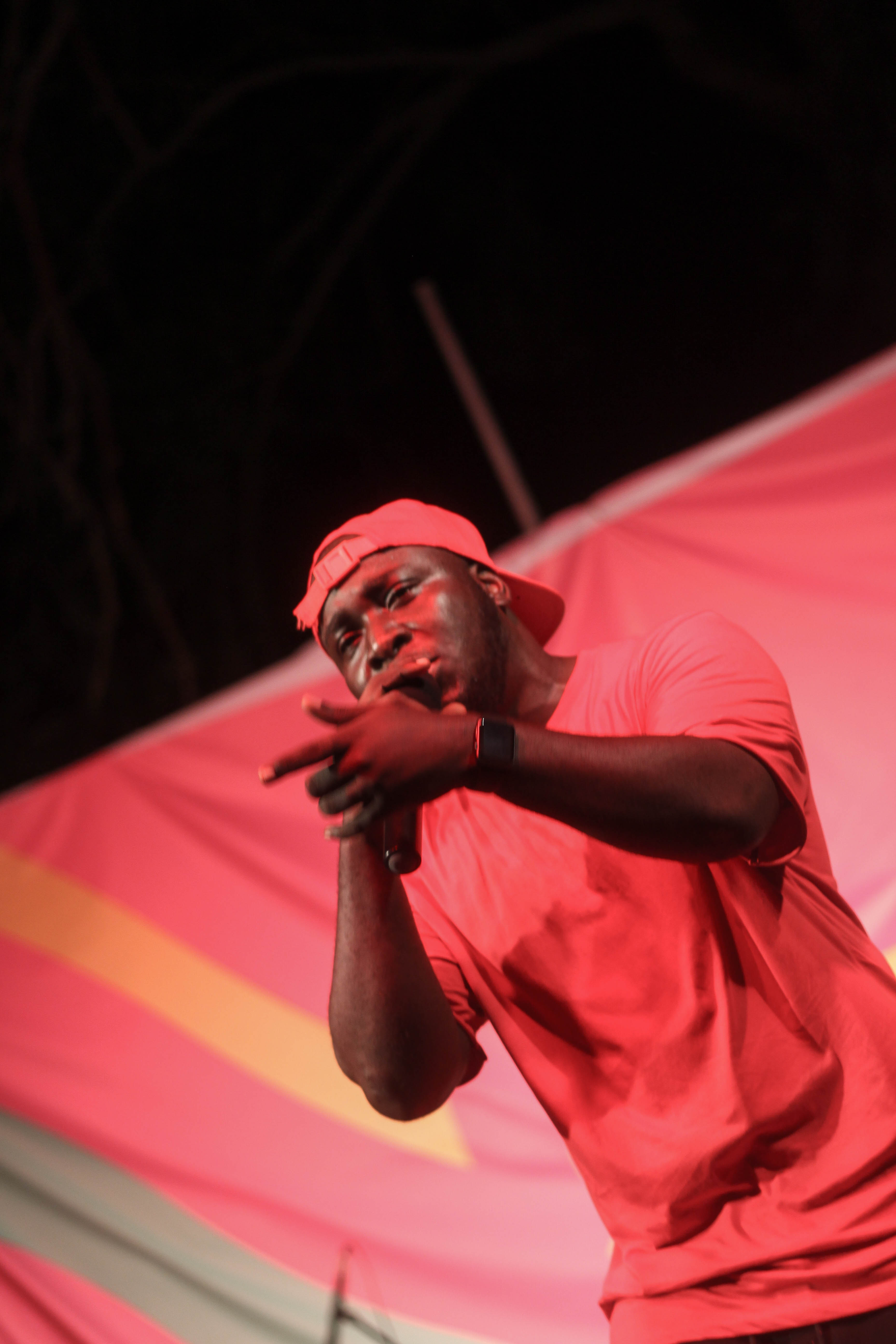
- Jayso performing at Sabolai Radio

Background information
- Also known as: De Skillions
- Born: Paul Nuamah Donkor; June 1, 1983 (age 43); Adenta, Accra, Ghana
- Genres: Hip hop,
- Occupations: Record producer, rapper, singer, record executive, sound engineer,
- Instruments: Keyboard, sampler
- Years active: 2002–present
- Label: Skillions Records

Paul "Jayso" Nuamah Donkor (born June 1, 1983) is a Ghanaian rapper, record producer, singer, songwriter, and entrepreneur. He gained significant attention after working on Sarkodie's single "Borga" and producing a majority of the songs on Sarkodie's debut album, "Maakye."

== Early life ==
During his teenage years at Presbyterian Boys' Senior High School (PRESEC-Legon), Jayso founded Skillions, a hip-hop group that both trained young artists and popularized local hip-hop in the wider Ghanaian music scene. Before Skillions, he collaborated with rapper-producer JPE (now Kobi Onyame, Canz, and Mr. Scratch to create the Haatsville Project, which led to the creation of a mixtape.

His current production credits include Sarkodie, M.anifest, Sway, Scientific, Kwaw Kese, okra, Jon Germain, Efya, Rumor and Nigerian MCs Naeto C and Ikechukwu and Gabonese artiste Baponga. On December 10, 2015, he released his debut album titled 'Making Tasha Proud' after over half a decade producing for others.

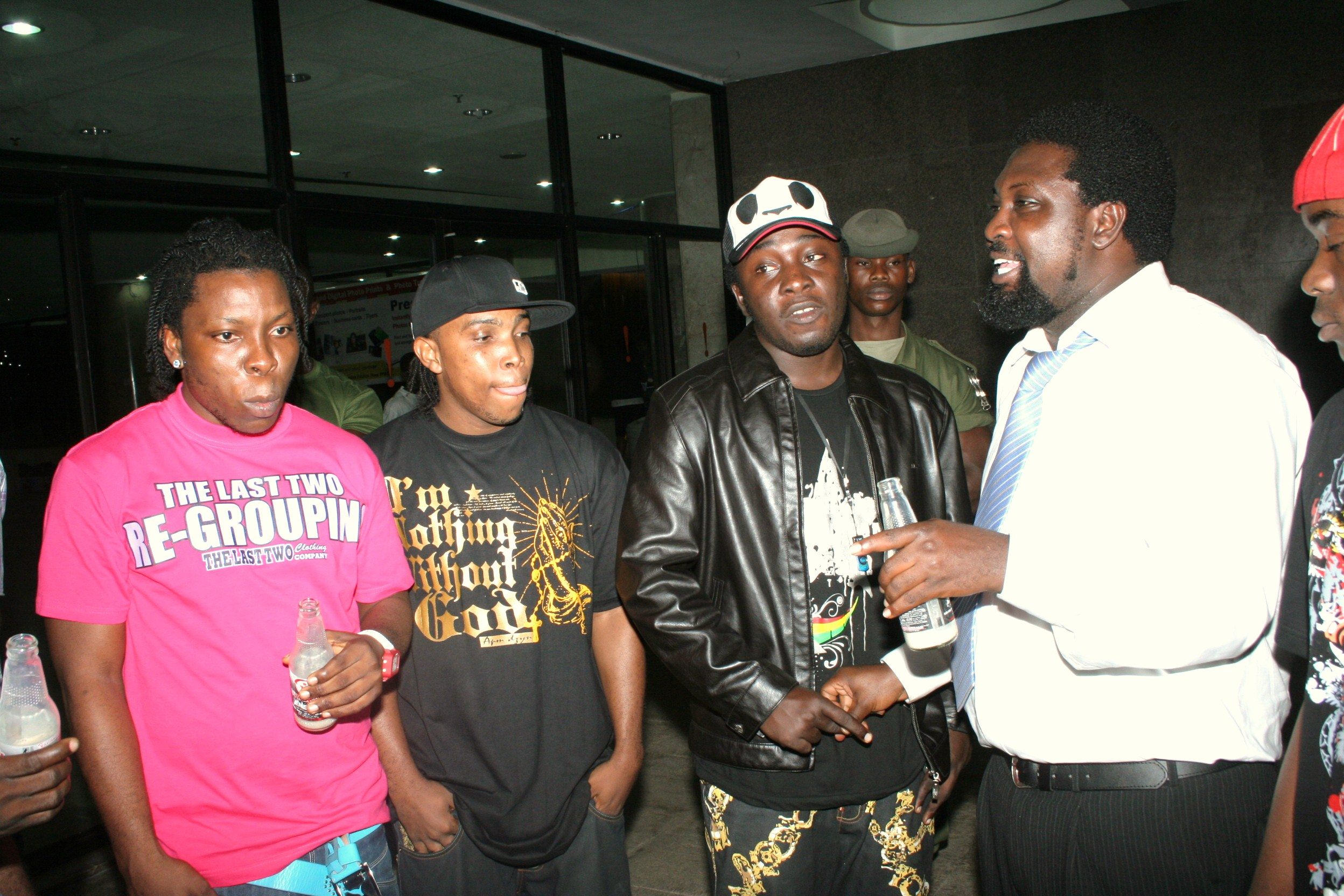
Hammer of the Last Two 3

== Early music career ==
Jayso's musical journey began during his formative years. During his tenure at PRESEC, he sharpened his talents as both a rapper and a producer. Before the formation of the "Haatsville Project" tape, Jayso collaborated with T-Kube. This partnership was short-lived as T-Kube relocated from Ghana to the UK in 2002. The "Haatsville Project" tape was recognized and appreciated particularly among young hip-hop aficionados.

Building on his experience from Haatsville, Jayso established his first hip-hop ensemble, Skillions. The group's initial members included Ball J and Jinx Therapy (later known as Frank P). They were soon joined by other artists like EL, Midnight, and J-Town.

With Jayso's guidance, Skillions made their debut with the mixtape 'Skillions Demotapes' in 2002. Jayso completed the entire recording in his makeshift bedroom studio. The mixtape, blending English with Ghanaian pidgin, was popular among the youth, firmly placing Skillions in the annals of Ghanaian rap history. Following the group's disbandment, Jayso led a new generation of Skillions, launching popular tracks under Skillion Records.

From 1999 onward, Jayso's career saw him collaborate with many artists, both in Ghana and internationally. On the global stage, he worked with hip-hop artist Wyclef Jean and the UK's Sway. Within Ghana's borders, his production portfolio includes collaborations with artists like Sarkodie, M.anifest, R2Bees, Efya, and more.

== Discography ==
=== Albums ===
- Making Tasha Proud (2016)
- 0106 Vol. 4 (2019)
- 0106 Vol. 5 (2020)

=== EPs ===
- 0106 Vol. 1 (2016)
- 0106 Vol. 2 (2017)
- 0106 Vol. 3 (2018)
- 0106 Vol. 6 (2021)

=== Collaborative albums ===
- T.M.G (with Sarkodie) (2013)
