= Sarkodie (rapper) =

Ghanaian rapper, songwriter and entrepreneur

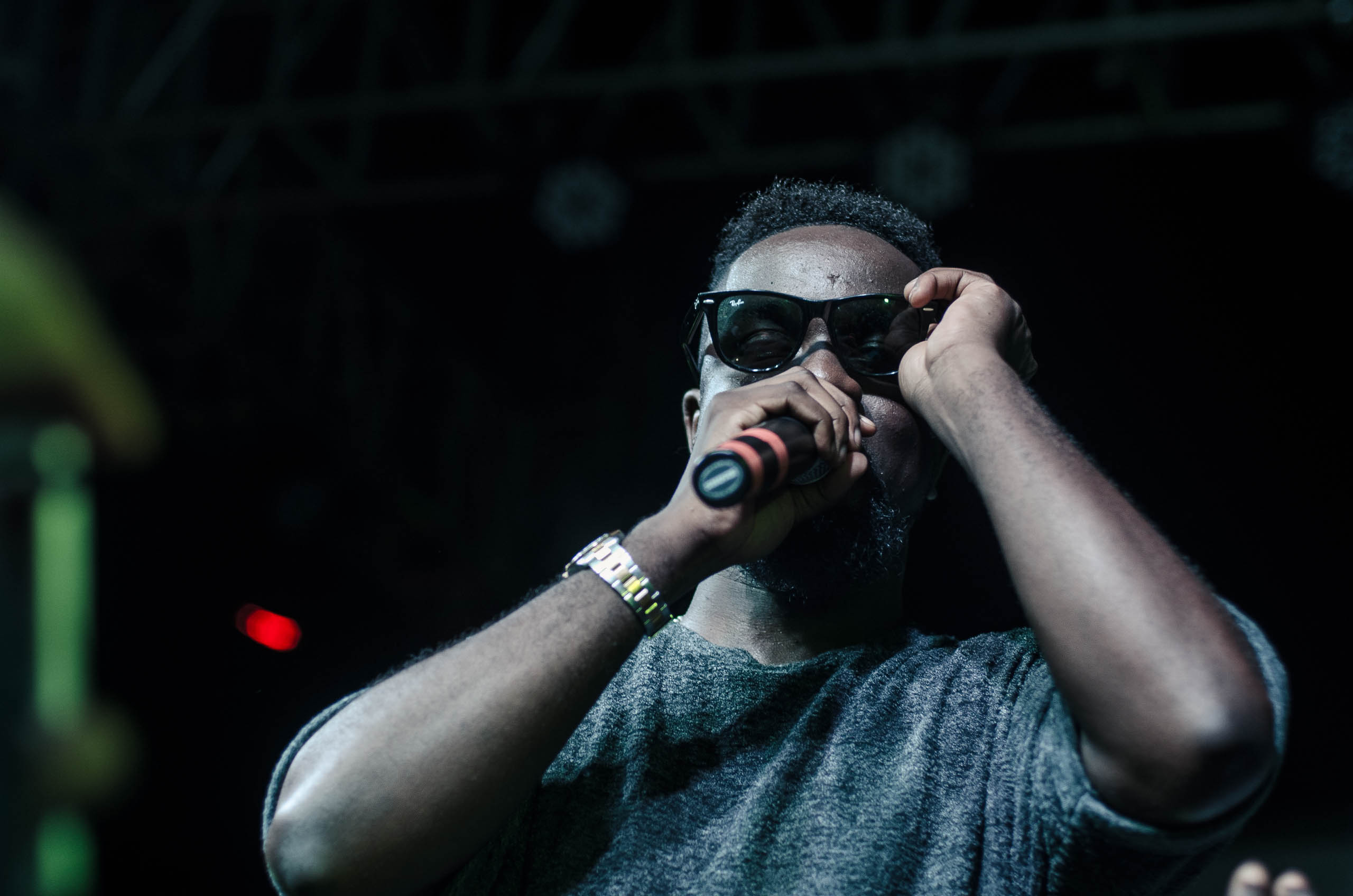

Background information
- Born: Michael Owusu Addo; July 10, 1985 (age 41); Tema, Ghana
- Origin: Ghana
- Genres: Hip Hop; Hiplife; Afrobeats
- Occupations: Rapper, Songwriter, Entrepreneur
- Years active: 2005–present
- Labels: Sarkcess Music; Duncwills Entertainment (former)

Michael Owusu Addo (born 10 July 1985), known professionally as Sarkodie (/sɑːrˈkɔːdiɛ/), is a Ghanaian rapper, songwriter, and entrepreneur from Tema. His contributions to the Ghanaian music industry have earned him numerous accolades, including the Ghana Music Award for Artiste of the Decade. He won Best International Flow Artist at the 2019 BET Hip Hop Awards. Sarkodie is considered one of the major proponents of the Azonto genre and dance. He has been labelled a "multifaceted rapper" and frequently raps in Twi.

== Life and career ==
=== Early life and career beginnings ===
Sarkodie, the fourth of five children was born on 10 July 1985. He was raised in Koforidua. His mother is from Cape Coast. He grew up in Tema where he started schooling. In his track, "Mile 7 Saga", he talked about how he was maltreated by a guardian he lived with. He attended Tema Methodist Day Senior High School and proceeded to the IPMC College of Technology, where he earned a degree in graphic design. Sarkodie began his music career as an underground rapper and gained recognition through rap competitions such as participating in Adom FM's popular rap competition Kasahare Level.

=== 2009–2012: Makye and Rapperholic ===
Following his collaboration with Hammer, Sarkodie recorded his debut album, Makye. Its production was primarily handled by Killbeatz and Jayso. The album features guest appearances from Kwaw Kese, J-Town, Sway, and Paedae of R2Bees. Makye received positive reviews from critics and fans. It was supported by a concert held at Holy City Gardens in Accra. On 16 September 2009, Sarkodie performed alongside Busta Rhymes at the Busta Rhymes Live in Ghana concert. In 2010, his "Push" and "Baby" songs were ranked ninth and thirteenth on Joy FM's Top 50 songs of 2009, respectively.

Sarkodie's second studio album, Rapperholic, was released in 2012. It features guest appearances from Efya, Chidynma, Mugeez of R2Bees, Obrafour, Jayso and EL. The album was supported by five singles: "Good Bye", "One Time For Your Mind", "You Go Kill Me", "Living Legend", and "Onyame Nhyira". It received positive reviews from music critics. Sarkodie went on a nationwide tour to support the album. Rapperholic earned Sarkodie his first BET nomination and subsequent win. Sarkodie was also featured on the BET Hip Hop Awards cypher alongside Talib Kweli, Jean Grae and Ab-Soul. He was the only African act featured on the cypher.

On 7 July 2012, Sarkodie kicked off his tour of Canada. He toured the United States in August 2012, performing in cities and states such as New York City, Ohio, New Jersey, Maryland, Atlanta, Chicago, Texas and Massachusetts. After releasing Rapperholic, Sarkodie embarked on a tour to promote the album. On 27 August 2012, Sarkodie performed alongside R2Bees, Fally Ipupa and Iyanya at the Africa Unplugged Music Festival. In 2012, Sarkodie performed "How Low" with Ludacris at the 020 Live concerts.

=== 2013–2014: Sarkology, Sarkcess Music, and Africa Rising campaign. ===
On 30 October 2013, Sarkodie released the official remix of "You Go Kill Me". The song peaked at number 1 on various charts in Ghana. Its remix features vocals from Wizkid, Ice Prince, Navio and EL. In January 2014, Sarkodie released his third studio album, Sarkology. Primarily recorded in Twi, the album features guest appearances from Fuse ODG, Davido, Tiwa Savage, Banky W., Timaya, 2 Face Idibia, Efya, Mugeez, Obrafour, Burna Boy, Vivian Chidid, Vector, Silvastone, Sk Blinks, Stonebwoy, Joey B, J Town, Lil Shaker, Raquel, Sian, Kofi B, and AKA. Its production was handled by Magnom, Hammer, Killbeatz, Masterkraft and Silvastone, among others. The album's launch concert was held at the Accra Sports Stadium in December.

Sarkodie released the official remix of "Adonai". It features vocals from Castro and appeared on Capital Xtra's list of the Top 35 Afrobeats Songs. Sarkodie launched the Sarkcess Music record label in 2014. As part of the launch, he premiered the video for "Adonai" (Remix) and "Special Someone". Sarkodie also released the songs "Megye Wo Girl", "Love Rocks", "Chingum", and "Whine Fi Me" under the label.

On 3 May 2014, Sarkodie performed at the 15th edition of the Ghana Music Awards. On 7 June 2014, he joined Miguel on stage to perform the latter's single "How Many Drinks?" at the MTV Africa Music Awards. In June 2014, Sarkodie collaborated with Mi Casa, Lola Rae, Davido, Diamond Platnumz and Tiwa Savage to record "Africa Rising", a song for DSTV's campaign of the same name. The campaign was designed to inspire Africans to partake in community-based social investment projects. The music video for "Africa Rising" was released on 24 June 2014. It was shot and directed by the South African production house Callback Dream.

=== 2015–2018: Mary and Highest ===
On 10 June 2015, Sarkodie released the Ace Hood-assisted "New Guy". It was released for digital consumption on 10 June 2015, through Sarkcess Music and Ivy League Records. Written by the two artists and produced by CedSolo, "New Guy" is an African hip hop and hip-hop song that contains alternating rap verses, while its lyrics deal with Sarkodie's desire and motivation for success. Development for "New Guy" began in early 2015 when Sarkodie paid a total of $25,000 to cover the production fees associated with the recording. He also wanted Ace Hood to appear on the track because he considered him "one of the world's most powerful rappers".

On 12 September 2015, Sarkodie released Mary, a live album named after his grandmother who died in 2012. "Mewu" was released as the lead single from the album two months prior. An autograph session for the album was held at the West Hills Mall in Accra. Sarkodie sold nearly 4,000 copies of the album on the first day of its release. In February 2016, he spoke to a group of Harvard Business School students. Themed "The Art of the Hustle", his speech was primarily about the challenges associated with being an African musician. Sarkodie also performed at the event following his speech.

Sarkodie held the fourth edition of his Rapperholic concert on Christmas Day. Tickets for the event sold out within 72 hours of its release. The concert featured additional performances from Fuse ODG, R2Bees, Wizkid, Samini, VVIP, Efya and Shatta Wale. On 11 March 2016, Sarkodie performed with the music band, The Composers at the O2's Indigo venue; the event was hosted by DJ Abrantee.

Sarkodie released his fifth studio album, Highest, on 8 September 2017. It comprises 19 songs, including 3 interludes and a bonus track. Released through Sarkcess Music and Dice Recordings, the album features guest appearances from Jesse Jagz, Moelogo, Flavour, Korede Bello, Victoria Kimani and Big Narstie. Highest was primarily produced by Jayso, with additional production from Masterkraft, TSpize, Ced Solo, Nova and Guilty Beatz.

=== 2019–2021: Alpha, Black Love, and No Pressure ===
Sarkodie released his debut extended play, Alpha, in June 2019. The six-track EP features guest appearances from Joey B and Ebony Reigns. Sarkodie teased his collaboration with Reigns during the Ebony Reigns concert, which commemorated the late singer. He released his fifth studio album, Black Love, on 20 December 2019. It features guest artists such as Mr Eazi, Efya, Donae'o, Idris Elba, Stonebwoy, Tekno, Maleek Berry, Herman Suede, King Promise and Kizz Daniel. The album was supported by the previously released singles "Party & Bullshit", "Saara", "Do You" and "Can't Let Go". In an interview with OkayAfrica in November, Sarkodie said the album explores themes of black love and relationships. On 19 April 2021, Sarkodie announced his soon-to-be-released 6th Studio Album, entitled "No Pressure". A trailer video was uploaded on YouTube, in anticipation of what fans would expect from the album. However, on 25 July 2021, Sarkodie announced a five-day countdown of the album, which would be released on 30 July 2021.

Sarkodie released the album, No Pressure, on 30 July 2021. The album features Wale, Vic Mensa, Giggs, Cassper Nyovest, Harmonize, Oxlade, Kwesi Arthur, Darko Vibes, Medikal, and MOGmusic.

=== 2022–present: Jamz and tour ===
Sarkodie in the latter parts of 2022 released the album Jamz, which had features from Black Sherif, King Promise, Inkboy and many top Nigerian acts as well. Major hits among them are "Labadi" with King Promise and "Countryside" with Black Sherif winning the award for Best Collaboration at the 2023 Vodafone Ghana Music Awards.

Sarkodie announced his upcoming tour for 2023 – the JAMZ World tour – via his YouTube page in September 2023. During the Jamz World Tour, he visited several countries across Africa and Europe. The tour included nine stops across various European countries, including the UK, France, Sweden, Denmark, Ireland, Netherlands, and Germany. Sarkodie took stages at each stop to deliver unforgettable performance, showcasing his exceptional talent and charismatic stage presence.

However, he missed his Jam World Tour show in Detroit due to flight issues. He had to do an emergency landing at Delta Air Lines on an island in Portugal, and he blamed the airline for this.

== Recognition ==
Sarkodie often raps in his native language, Twi, a Ghanaian language, and is considered a "multifaceted rapper" due to the various musical styles he possesses. Sarkodie is often named as one of Africa's best hip hop artists. MTV Base ranked him sixth on its list of the Hottest African MCs in 2014. In 2013, Lynx TV ranked him first on its list of the "Top 10 Ghanaian Rappers of All Time". In 2015, AfricaRanking.com ranked him third on its list of the "Top 10 African Rappers of 2015". In 2015, The Guardian listed him as one of its top five hip hop acts on the African continent. He was ranked 8th on Forbes and Channel O's 2013 and 2015 list of the Top 10 Richest/Bankable African Artistes. In 2020, he won "Artiste of the Year" during the Ghana Music Awards USA (GMA USA).

== Philanthropy ==
On 13 July 2013, Sarkodie launched The Sarkodie Foundation, a non-profit organization dedicated to supporting underprivileged children. He made generous donations to the Royal Seed Home Orphanage in Kasoa. On 25 December 2014, The Foundation embarked on a "Feed the Kids' Campaign" in Tema, Ghana, where they provided thousands of kids with bags of rice, yogurt and beverage cans. They also gave away school bags, water bottles, hats and other items. Roshi Motman, the CEO of Tigo Telecommunications, was also in attendance to support the campaign.

== Business career and endorsements ==
Sarkodie owns the Sark by Yas clothing line, which was launched on 27 April 2013. The clothing line has accessories for men, women and children. In 2012, he was officially unveiled as the Brand Ambassador for Samsung Electronics at the University of Ghana, Legon. As part of the event, Samsung unveiled the Samsung Galaxy Pocket and Chief Hero Phones that had customized wallpapers of Sarkodie and his signature; users had the opportunity to download exclusive tracks of Sarkodie. He also launched the Obidi Chief headphones and signed an endorsement deal with FanMilk Ghana in 2013. Sarkodie is currently in partnership with Tigo Telecommunications Ghana, a brand that sponsored his 2013 Rapperholic tour.

Sarkodie also has endorsement deals with Standard Chartered Bank – a leading banking firm in Africa – as well as Guinness Ghana Limited for their Malt drink product. On 30 October 2019, he was appointed as an ambassador for the Year of Return campaign; the honour was conferred on him at the Creative Arts Industry Forum. In March 2021, Sarkodie and his little daughter were featured in Ghana's leading toothpaste brand – Pepsodent Ghana's #BrushWithMe campaign ad. The campaign was done to rally parents and guardians to start and encourage a day and night tooth-brushing routine with their children. This was done to commemorate World Oral Health Day. Sarkodie recently partnered with First National Bank as the banks new ambassador and this partnership focuses on FirstBank Ghana’s continuation of its Junior Internship Programme (JIP), a unique initiative designed to provide young customers with invaluable work experience and insights into the banking industry.

== Personal life ==
Sarkodie married Tracy in a private wedding ceremony held in Tema, Ghana, on 17 July 2018. They have two children. In an interview, he disclosed that he was separated from his parents during childhood, leading to him being an "introvert and observant approach to life".

== Controversies ==
=== Shatta Wale ===
Shatta Wale and Sarkodie had a very beautiful relationship and no one knew what triggered a sudden beef between the two heavy-weight musicians. Shatta Wale began to lambast Sarkodie at every chance. Sarkodie at a point also became fed up with Shatta Wale's continues attack on his brand so he also replied him with a one diss track "Advice". However, on 23 August 2023, Shatta Wale in an interview with Serwaa Amihere on X(Twitter) Space revealed why he's always on Sarkodie and according to him it was about a GLO deal which they both agreed on taking a higher amount but Sarkodie went back to take less without his knowledge

=== Yvonne Nelson ===
In the memoir titled "I am Not Yvonne Nelson", Ghanaian actress Yvonne Nelson narrates her past relationship with Sarkodie. She described how she became pregnant unexpectedly for him and made the decision to end the pregnancy.

Later, Sarkodie responded to Yvonne Nelson with an outstanding single dubbed Try Me. He clearly stated in the song, he was not the one who asked Yvonne to terminate the pregnancy but Yvonne, herself, asked for the termination of the pregnancy due to her determination not to end her academic studies.

=== Samini ===
In January 2023, Ghanaian dancehall artist, Samini, accused Sarkodie of disrespect, for ignoring him after he reached out to Sarkodie for a collaboration. Sarkodie subsequently apologized to Samini on a radio show but claimed Samini's accusation might not have been his true intention.

== Incidents ==
Sarkodie recounted a distressing incident where he faced a near-death experience with Delta Air Lines. The ordeal involved an emergency landing on a remote island in Portugal, casting a somber shadow on his memories of Saturday, 9 September 2023.

== Discography ==
Studio albums

- Makye (2009)
- Rapperholic (2012)
- Sarkology (2014)
- Highest (2017)
- Black Love (2019)
- No Pressure (2021)
- Jamz (2022)

Live albums

- Mary (2015)

Collaborative albums

- T.M.G (with Jayso) (2013)

EPs

- Alpha (2019)
- Championship (2024)
