= Kayso =

Ghanaian record producer

- Birth name: Sony Kwame Owusu
- Also known as: From Tema; Beat Nyame
- Born: Tema, Ghana
- Genres: Afro pop; Hip hop; Afrobeats; R&B; Trap
- Occupation(s): record producer, singer, songwriter, audio engineer
- Instrument(s): Digital audio workstation, vocals, keyboards
- Years active: 2014–present
- Labels: From Tema

Sony Kwame Owusu (born July 6, 1991), known professionally as Kayso (styled as KaySo), From Tema or Beat Nyame, is a Ghanaian record producer, and recording artist from Ashanti Region. KaySo has produced singles for a number of well known artists in diverse genres, ranging from Hip Hop, Afrobeats, R&B, Afroswing, Hiplife and Highlife. Artists KaySo has worked with include Becca, Kwesi Arthur, KiDi, Sarkodie, Medikal, Ice Prince, Darkovibes, $pacely, Kofi Mole, Dj Mic Smith, Kirani Ayat, Wiyaala, Stonebwoy, Blaqbonez, Pappy Kojo, Cina Soul, Mugeez, Offei and Magnom.

== Early life and music career ==
Kayso produced the single "Grind Day" by Kwesi Arthur and the remix which featured Sarkodie and Medikal. The song won "Hiphop Song Of The Year" award at the 2018 Vodafone Ghana Music Awards. He also produced KiDi's song "Say Cheese" which featured Teddy Riley.

== Production credits ==
Year	Artist	Title	Album
2016	Kirani Ayat	I Don't Know You (feat. KaySo)	Single
2017	Kwesi Arthur	Ade Akye Free Grind Day Back On The Wall Devil Knocking	Live From Nkrumah Krom, Vol I
2017	Cina Soul	Awo	Single
2017	Kwesi Arthur (feat. Sarkodie, Medikal)	Grind Day (Remix)	Single
2017	Stonebwoy	One Thing (feat. Damaris)	Single
2020	KiDi	Say Cheese	Blue (EP)
2018	Kofi Mole	Mensah (feat. Kwesi Arthur)	Single
2018	La Même Gang	Reveal (Fly You Out)	La Même Tape: Linksters
2018	Criss Waddle	King Kong (feat. Kwesi Arthur)	Single
2018	DJ Kess	Take Away (feat. Twitch & Kayso)	Single
2018	DJ Mic Smith	Yenkor (feat. Kwesi Arthur)	Single
2018	Twitch 4eva	Hwana	Single
2019	Kwesi Arthur	Colours	Live From Nkrumah Krom, Vol. II: Home Run
2019	Kirani Ayat	Mariama (feat. Sarkodie)	Single
2019	Twitch 4eva	Happy Everyday	Single
2019	Mugeez	Dripping (feat. Dj Mic Smith & Kwesi Arthur)	Single
2019	Offei	Santorini	Single
2019	Hama	Bounce	Single
2020	ZeeTM	Wayo	Single
2020	KaySo	Take It	Single
2020	Dj Mic Smith	Juju (feat. Blaqbonez, CKay, T'neeya, Pappy Kojo, Kweku Afro & J Derobie)	Single
2020	KwakuBs	Que Sera (feat. Hama)	Single
2021	Sarkodie	Rollies and Cigars	Single

== Discography ==
Sounds
Year	Title	Album
2016	"Dumb" (featuring Kwesi Arthur)	Single
2017	"About To Blow" (featuring Kwesi Arthur)	
2017	"Lovey" (featuring Papa chie)	
2017	"Your Type No Dey"	EP
2018	"Abena"	Single
2019	"Flourish (Amen)"	Single
2019	"Money"	Single
2020	"Take It"	Single

== Award and nominations ==
Year	Award	Nomination	Results	Ref
2021	3Music Awards	Producer Of The Year	Nominated	
2021	Ghana Music Awards (USA)	Producer Of The Year	Nominated	
