= Kyryl Bielobrov =

Ukrainian ice dancer

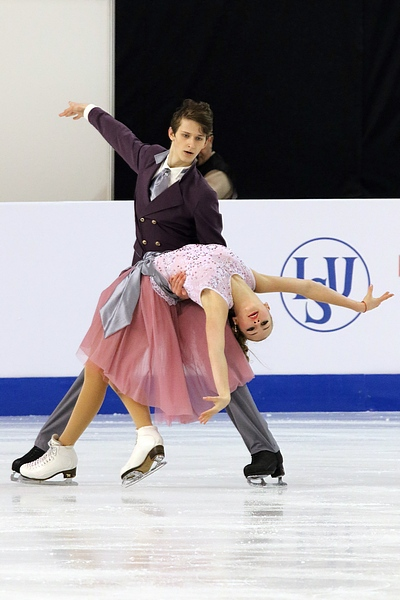
- Bielobrov with Holubtsova at the 2016 World Junior Championships

Personal information
- Native name: Кирил Бєлобров (Ukrainian)
- Born: 29 November 2000 (age 25) Kyiv, Ukraine
- Home town: Kyiv, Ukraine
- Height: 1.84 m (6 ft 1/2 in)

Figure skating career
- Country: Ukraine
- Partner: Mariia Holubtsova
- Coach: Romain Haguenauer, Marie-France Dubreuil, Patrice Lauzon, Josée Piché
- Skating club: Leader Kyiv
- Began skating: 2004

Kyryl Vladyslavovych Bielobrov (Ukrainian: Кирил Владиславович Бєлобров; born 29 November 2000) is a Ukrainian ice dancer. With his skating partner, Mariia Holubtsova, he is the 2021 Pavel Roman Memorial bronze medalist and a two-time Ukrainian national silver medalist. The duo competed in the final segment at the 2016 and 2020 World Junior Championships.

== Career ==
=== Early years ===
Bielobrov began learning to skate in 2004.

Holubtsova/Bielobrov debuted on the ISU Junior Grand Prix (JGP) series in September 2014, placing tenth in Japan.

=== 2015–16 season ===
Holubtsova/Bielobrov received two Junior Grand Prix assignments. They placed tenth at the 2015 JGP Slovakia in August and seventh at the 2015 JGP Croatia in October.

In February, they represented Ukraine in Norway at the 2016 Winter Youth Olympics. Ranked ninth in the short dance and sixth in the free dance, they finished seventh overall in the ice dancing competition. They also competed in the team event, placing fifth as members of Team Focus. In March, they competed at the 2016 World Junior Championships in Hungary. Ranked twentieth in the short dance, they qualified to the final segment and went on to finish eighteenth overall with a rank of seventeenth in the free dance.

=== 2019–20 season ===
Competing in the 2019–20 ISU Junior Grand Prix, Holubtsova/Bielobrov finished fifth in Latvia and seventh in Croatia. Ranked fourteenth in both segments, they placed fourteenth overall at the 2020 World Junior Championships in Tallinn, Estonia.

=== 2021–22 season ===
Holubtsova/Bielobrov made their senior international debut in October 2021, placing fourth at the Budapest Trophy in Hungary. In November, they took bronze at the Pavel Roman Memorial in the Czech Republic and then finished ninth at the 2021 CS Warsaw Cup, having ranked seventh in the rhythm dance and ninth in the free. In December, they finished second to Nazarova/Nikitin at the Ukrainian Championships and were selected to compete at the 2022 European Championships in Tallinn, Estonia.

In late February, Vladimir Putin ordered an invasion of Ukraine, as a result of which the International Skating Union banned all Russian and Belarusian skaters from competing. As a result, Holubtsova/Bielobrov had to change training locations from Kyiv to Oberstorf, Germany. In addition, they also began training at the Ice Dance Academy of Montreal in Montreal, Quebec.

=== 2022–23 season ===
Holubtsova/Bielobrov began their season with an eighth-place finish at the 2022 CS Nebelhorn Trophy. They then went on to make their senior ISU Grand Prix debut at 2022 Skate America, where they placed tenth. They were tenth as well as the 2022 MK John Wilson Trophy, their second Grand Prix.

Competing at the 2023 Winter University Games, Holubtsova/Bielobrov finished fifth.

At the 2023 European Championships in Espoo, Finland, Holubtsova/Bielobrov placed twelfth, before finishing their season at the 2023 World Championships in Saitama, Japan, where they placed nineteenth.

=== 2023–24 season ===
Prior to the season, Holubtsova/Bielobrov permanently settled in Montreal to train at the Ice Academy of Montreal to be trained under Romain Haguenauer, Marie-France Dubreuil, Patrice Lauzon, and Josée Piché.

== Programs ==
With Holubtsova

Season	Rhythm dance	Free dance
2023–24	Holding Out for a Hero by Bonnie Tyler & Jim Steinman; Straight from the Heart by Bryan Adams & Bonnie Tyler; If You Were a Woman (And I Was a Man) by Bonnie Tyler & Desmond Child choreo. by Romain Haguenauer, Pascal Denis, Samuel Chouinard	Merry-Go-Round; Fragile Dream; Merry-Go-Round; A Walk in the Skies (from Howl's Moving Castle) by Joe Hisaishi choreo. by Romain Haguenauer, Pascal Denis, Samuel Chouinard
2022–23	Samba: Sad Girlz Luv Money by Amaarae & Moliy; Rhumba: Cuando caliente el sol by Talya Ferro, Carlos Alberto Martinoli, Carlos Rigual Rodriguez, Mario Rigual Rodriguez; Samba: Conga by Gloria Estefan & Miami Sound Machine choreo. by Mariia Tumanovska-Chaika	I'll Keep Coming; Bones; Don't Be So Serious; Without You by Low Roar choreo. by Mariia Tumanovska-Chaika
2021–22	My Tunnels Are Long And Dark These Days by Asaf Avidan; Marvellous Party by Beverley Knight	Lento by Na Yoon-sun; Meditation (mix); Impossible Love by Melody Gardot; Differente (orchestra version) by Gotan Project
2020–21	Foxtrot: Cheek to Cheek; Swing: I Won't Dance; Swing: Cheek to Cheek (from Top Hat) by Irving Berlin	
2019–20	Foxtrot: Cheek to Cheek; Swing: I Won't Dance; Swing: Cheek to Cheek (from Top Hat) by Irving Berlin	Le cygne; Danse macabre by Camille Saint-Saëns
2018–19	Tango: Zitarossa; Tango: Sabelo performed by Bajofondo	W.E. by Abel Korzeniowski; Charms; Abdication
	Rhythm dance	
2017–18	Cha Cha: Kaboom performed by Ursula 1000; Rhumba: Love Freedom; Samba: Hip Hip Chin Chin performed by DJ Maksy	Hallelujah by Leonard Cohen
2016–17	Hip Hop: Clint Eastwood; Blues: Gravity; Swing: Clint Eastwood by Gorillaz	The Crimson Wing: Mystery of the Flamingos by The Cinematic Orchestra
2015–16	Waltz: Masquerade by Aram Khachaturian	Super Mario Bros. by Alan Silvestri
2014–15	Samba: La Bomba; Cha Cha: Pao Pao; Samba: Bombon Asesino	Baron Munchausen by Roman Surzha

== Competitive highlights ==
GP: Grand Prix; CS: Challenger Series; JGP: Junior Grand Prix

With Holubtsova

International
Event	14–15	15–16	16–17	17–18	18–19	19–20	20–21	21–22	22–23	23–24
Worlds									19th	26th
Europeans								17th	12th	14th
GP Skate America									10th	
GP Wilson Trophy									10th	
CS Autumn Classic										WD
CS Nebelhorn									8th	
CS Nepela Memorial										9th
CS Warsaw Cup								9th		5th
Budapest Trophy								4th		
Jégvirág Cup								WD		
Pavel Roman								3rd		
University Games									5th	
International: Junior
Junior Worlds		18th				14th				
Youth Olympics		7th								
JGP Armenia					5th					
JGP Croatia		7th				7th				
JGP Czechia					5th					
JGP Germany			5th							
JGP Italy				9th						
JGP Japan	10th									
JGP Latvia				6th		5th				
JGP Slovakia		10th								
JGP Slovenia			6th							
Bosphorus Cup						1st				
Budapest Trophy							1st			
GP Bratislava					2nd					
Halloween Cup						1st				
Ice Star			6th							
Jégvirág Cup						1st				
NRW Trophy	13th									
Santa Claus Cup			4th	2nd						
Tallinn Trophy				4th						
Toruń Cup			3rd	2nd	4th					
Volvo Open Cup					4th					
Warsaw Cup					2nd					
National
Ukraine		3rd	4th			3rd	2nd	2nd		
Ukraine, Junior		2nd	2nd							
Team events
Youth Olympics		5th T 5th P								
TBD = Assigned; WD = Withdrew; T = Team result; P = Personal result
