= Amaarae =

Ghanaian-American singer (born 1994)

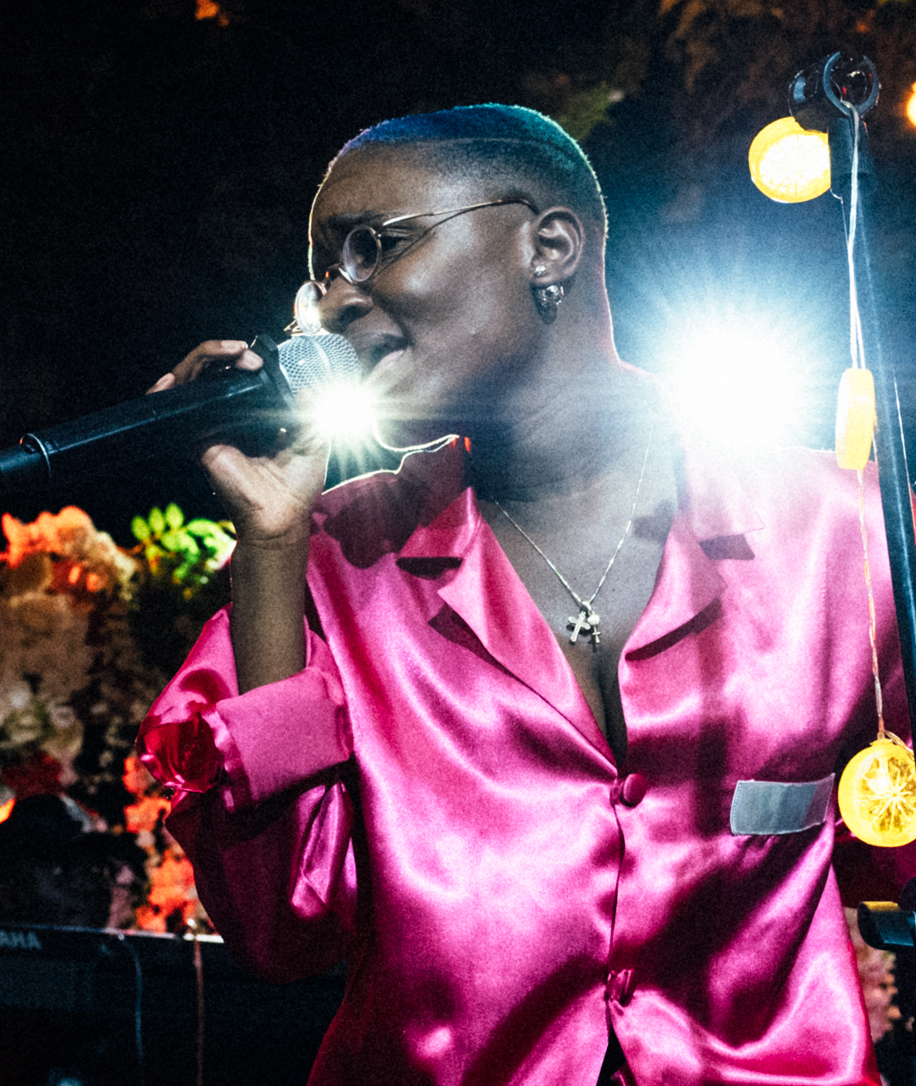
- Amaarae performing in 2018

Background information
- Born: Ama Serwah Genfi; July 4, 1994 (age 32); Bronx, New York, U.S.
- Origin: Accra, Ghana
- Genres: Pop; R&B; Afrobeats; alté
- Occupations: Singer; songwriter
- Years active: 2010–present
- Labels: Sad Saints Angry Angels; Golden Child; Platoon; 0207; Interscope; Golden Angel
- Website: amaaraemusic.com

Ama Serwah Genfi (born July 4, 1994), known professionally as Amaarae, is a Ghanaian-American singer and songwriter. She is known for her fusion of pop, R&B, Afrobeats, and alté, as well as her fluid representation of gender and sexuality. After collaborating with local artists and putting out a few non-album singles, she released her debut EP, Passionfruit Summers, in 2017.

In 2020, Amaarae released her debut album The Angel You Don't Know to critical acclaim. The song "Sad Girlz Luv Money" featuring Moliy gained popularity on TikTok. In 2021 the song was remixed with a feature from Kali Uchis and charted globally. Pitchfork labeled the album "Best New Music" and named it the 19th best album of 2020.

On June 9, 2023, she released her highly anticipated second album Fountain Baby to rave reviews. In August 2025, she released Black Star, her third studio album. S.M.O, a single off the album, was ranked as the 3rd best song of 2025 in Pitchfork's 2025 list of Top 100 song.

== Early life ==
Amaarae was born in the Bronx, New York to Ama Bawuah and Kwadwo Boateng Genfi and was raised between Atlanta, New Jersey and Accra, Ghana. She is the elder of two children. Amaarae wrote her first song at the age of 13. During her teenage years, she enjoyed watching music videos and said that one of her most vivid memories was watching the music video for the Kelis song "Young, Fresh n' New". She recalls Kelis' unique expression being an inspiration for her.

She attended Ghana International School for a few years. During high school, she started making mixtapes. By the age of 17, she took up an internship at a music studio. She went to Agnes Scott College, where she studied English literature and took classes in music business. After graduating, she returned to Ghana in June 2017.

== Career ==
Amaarae wrote her first mixtape, In Splendid Isolation, ISI for short, at 17 years old while in Ghana. It features the songs "She Came First", Amaarae's take on Cassie and Ryan Leslie's "Addiction", and the song "CrukdStr8", her spin on Big Sean's "A$$".

Amaarae released her debut project Passionfruit Summers in 2017. The album features the song "Fluid", which was complemented by a music video.

Amaarae was named one of Apple Music Africa's Favourite New Artists in April 2018 and later that year became an Apple Music Beats 1 featured artist for her debut project Passionfruit Summers which she released through her independent record label, Golden Child LLC on November 30, 2017. In November 2018 she performed with Teni, BOJ and Odunsi (The Engine) at ART X Lagos, an art fair in Lagos, Nigeria.

Amaarae has also been acknowledged for her style and fashion sense. In 2018, she was featured in Vogue online in an article on four women across the globe with buzz haircuts and was mentioned as one of Vogue online's Top 100 Style Influencers of 2018. She was nominated as Artist of the Year at the Glitz Style Awards in Ghana. She has also patronized Ghanaian fashion brand Free The Youth.

On March 23, 2019, Amaarae was chosen to perform at the first Boiler Room event in Accra alongside La Meme Gang (A Collective comprising Nxwrth, RJZ, KwakuBS, Darkovibes, Kiddblack and $pacely) and rapper Kwesi Arthur.

Amaarae has since collaborated with Stonebwoy, Kojey Radical, M3NSA, Santi, Blaqbonez, Buju, Odunsi, B4bonah. In 2019, she collaborated with the Nigerian singer-songwriter Wande Coal.

On November 12, 2020, Amaarae released her debut studio album, The Angel You Don't Know. Owen Myers of Pitchfork wrote that it "crackles with innovation, a pacesetter at a time when industry bigwigs are waking up to the long-held truth that Africa is setting the global tempo for pop music."

In May 2022, Amaarae, together with Black Sherif, Stonebwoy and Smallgod met Kendrick Lamar when he visited Ghana and held a private album listening party in Accra for his new album, Mr. Morale & The Big Steppers.

On June 9, 2023, she released her sophomore album Fountain Baby via Interscope Records. The release also came with the news that she had become the first Ghanaian to appear on NPR Tiny Desk.

On April 14, 2025, Amaarae made history as the first Ghanaian artist to perform a solo set at the Coachella Valley Music and Arts Festival. Her performance on the Gobi Stage featured unreleased tracks and songs by Ghanaian artists such as La Même Gang, Eazzy, Joey B, and the Asakaa Boys. During the set, she announced her upcoming album Black Star and notably shaved her head on stage, a move that garnered significant attention on social media.

On August 8, 2025, Amaarae released her third album Black Star. The official music video for "Fineshyt" was also released on the same day.

== Discography ==
=== Studio albums ===
List of studio albums, with selected details
Title	Details
The Angel You Don't Know	Released: November 12, 2020; Label: Golden Child; Format: Digital download, streaming
Fountain Baby	Released: June 9, 2023; Label: Golden Child, Interscope Records; Format: Digital download, streaming
Black Star	Released: August 8, 2025; Label: Golden Child, Interscope Records; Format: Digital download, streaming

=== EP ===
List of EPs, with selected details
Title	Details
Passionfruit Summers	Released: November 30, 2017; Label: Golden Child; Format: Digital download

=== Singles ===
List of singles
Title	Year	Peak chart positions									Certifications	Album
Title	Year	US	US Afro.	CAN	IRE	NZ	SWI	UK	UK Afro.	WW	Certifications	Album
"Spend Some Time" (featuring Wande Coal)	2019	—	—	—	—	—	—	—	—	—		Non-album singles
"Like It"	2019	—	—	—	—	—	—	—	—	—		Non-album singles
"Leave Me Alone"	2020	—	—	—	—	—	—	—	—	—		The Angel You Don't Know
"Fancy"	2020	—	—	—	—	—	—	—	—	—		The Angel You Don't Know
"Sad Girlz Luv Money" (with Moliy featuring Kali Uchis)	2021	80	—	48	28	29	18	29	—	26	RIAA: Platinum; BPI: Gold; MC: Platinum; RMNZ: Platinum	The Angel You Don't Know
"Reckless & Sweet"	2023	—	26	—	—	—	—	—	10	—		Fountain Baby (Note: "Sweeeet" is only included on the reissue EP of Fontaine Baby that is called Roses are Red, Tears are Blue.)
"Co-Star"	2023	—	47	—	—	—	—	—	19	—		Fountain Baby
"Wasted Eyes"	2023	—	—	—	—	—	—	—	—	—		Fountain Baby
"Angels in Tibet"	2024	—	5	—	—	—	—	—	10	—		Fountain Baby
"Sweeeet"	2024	—	—	—	—	—	—	—	—	—		Fountain Baby
"S.M.O."	2025	—	—	—	—	—	—	—	17	—		Black Star
"Girlie-Pop!"	2025	—	—	—	—	—	—	—	—	—		Black Star
"Fineshyt"	2025	—	—	—	—	—	—	—	—	—		Black Star
"—" denotes a recording that did not chart or was not released in that territory.

=== As a featured artist ===
Year	Title	Album
2017	"Whoa!" (AYLØ featuring Amaarae)	Insert Project Name
2017	"On Me" (Dex Kwasi featuring Amaarae)	Non-album single
2018	"Pepper Dem" (Stonebwoy featuring Amaarae)	Epistles of Mama
2018	"Rapid Fire" (Santi featuring Amaarae)	Mandy & the Jungle
2018	"Hectic" (Odunsi featuring Amaarae)	rare.
2018	"SDI" (M3NSA featuring Amaarae)	Non-album single
2019	"Platinum Sex" (Mina featuring Amaarae)	Flight Paths
2019	"Like Water" (Gafacci featuring Amaarae)	Tash BNM
2019	"Settle Down" (Santi featuring Amaarae)	Mandy & the Jungle
2019	"Shame" (B4bonah featuring Amaarae)	B4Beginning
2019	"Sugar" (Kojey Radical featuring Amaarae)	Cashmere Tear
2019	"Mewu" (Ground Up Chale featuring Twitch & Amaarae)	We Outside (Y3 Wo Abonten) Vol. 1
2019	"Too Bad" (featuring Show Dem Camp and TEMS)	The Palmwine Express
2020	"Still Dey Inside" (OIEE & M3NSA featuring Amaarae)	Non-album singles
2020	"Follow My Lead" (FRIDAY NIGHT CRU featuring Tessellated and Amaarae)	Non-album singles
2020	"Count On Me" (Blessed featuring Amaarae)	Music Is the Medicine
2021	"Bling" (Blaqbonez featuring Amaarae & Buju)	Sex Over Love
2022	"This Is What I Mean" (Stormzy featuring Black Sherif, Amaarae, Ms Banks and Storry)	This Is What I Mean
2023	"Sossaup" (Kaytraminé featuring Amaarae)	Kaytraminé
2023	"The Rush" (Janelle Monáe featuring Nia Long & Amaarae)	The Age of Pleasure
2023	"KUBOLOR" (ODUMODUBLVCK featuring Amaarae)	EZIOKWU
2024	"In The Night" (Childish Gambino featuring Jorja Smith & Amaarae)	Bando Stone & The New World

=== Other charted songs ===
List of other charted songs
Title	Year	Peak chart positions	Album
Title	Year	US Afro.	Album
"Princess Going Digital"	2023	12	Fountain Baby

== Nominations ==
Year	Event	Category	Recipient/Nominated Work	Result	Ref
2021	Vodafone Ghana Music Awards	Record of the Year	Amaarae – Fancy	Nominated	
2021	Vodafone Ghana Music Awards	Best Music Video of the Year	Amaarae – Fancy	Nominated	
2022	The Headies Awards	Best West African Artiste of the Year	Amaarae	Nominated	
2025	UK Music Video Awards	Best R&B / Soul / Jazz Video – International	"S.M.O."	Nominated	
