= Smallgod =

- Born: Nana Kwame Appiasei; 12 March 1977 (age 49)
- Genres: Afro pop, Afrobeats
- Occupations: Singer, song writer, Beat maker
- Label: Nasecworld

Nana Kwame Appiasei (born March 12, 1977) known professionally as Smallgod, is a Ghanaian music entrepreneur, culture and streetwear connoisseur for years who has finally taking a leap of faith to be an artist. His contributions to the Ghanaian music industry have earned him numerous accolades, the most prominent being, 'Abonten Father.

== Early life ==
Smallgod during his early life had to move around a lot. He was raised between London, Ghana and The Netherlands. These various cultures unite to form a peculiar taste in music; which goes beyond cultures and genres and signifies Smallgod’s distinct music career today.

== Career ==
He started dabbling into music by opening a night club called 'Basement' in 2003 which he run for 4 years. Through that, he met a lot of artists during that time and started managing Ghanaian Reggae act Black Prophet, and then went on to sign Ghanaian rapper J-Town. During this time, he was connecting and helping many of the Ghanaian artists who were emerging at the time. Years down the line, he managed Nigerian Alté artist Wavy The Creator and Ghanaian-UK rapper and singer Eugy official. He also owns a record label and publishing company called Nasecworld with London-rapper Lp2loose as the current signing. Smallgod is also a huge fashion enthusiast, having done clothing collaborations with some local and diaspora fashion brands like ‘FREE THE YOUTH,’ ‘Daily Paper,’ ‘FILLING PIECES,’ ‘STEELO,’ ‘area boys,’ ‘BIKERZ SUNDAYS,’ ‘THE NEW ORIGINALS’ and ‘Xpltcstudio'

== Recognition ==
Smallgod has been active in the Ghanaian music and entertainment industry and has been involved in promoting collaboration between Ghanaian artists and international performers. He has worked with artists including Wizkid, Tiwa Savage, Tory Lanez, Sarkodie, Headie One, King Promise, Black Sherif and others. His activities in music and entertainment have been covered in publications such as GQ, Vogue, Ebony, and Industrie Africa.

== Discography ==
=== Albums ===
==== Building Bridges. (2021) ====
- Intro (In The Line) ft Eddie Kadi
- Simple Instruction ft R2Bees
- Never Leave Me Solo ft Amartey & Terri
- Let Them Kno ft Tiwa Savage, Kwesi Arthur
- Give it to Me ft 2Baba
- Interlude (Still In Line pt. 1) ft Eddie Kadi
- This is Love ft Efya, Henry X
- Nice Life ft Busiswa
- Lingo ft Rich2Gether
- Salam Aleikum ft Jayboogz, Darkovibes
- I Go Give ft Shatta Wale, DJ Tunez, Eugy
- Interlude (Still In Line pt. 2) ft Eddie Kadi
- Fa Ma Mi ft Kwamz & Flava, King Promise, Eugy
- Marry Me ft Harmonize
- She Like Money ft Kojo Funds, Lp2loose, Di-Meh, OB, Diztortion
- I Know ft DYSTINCT
- Somebody ft Wavy The Creator, Samini, T'neeya
- Pree Me ft Lp2loose, Kojo Funds
- Sinner ft Headie One, O'Kenneth, Kwaku DMC, Lp2loose
- Outro (Never Got In) ft Eddie Kadi

==== Connecting the Dots. (2022) ====
- Falling ft KiDi, Darkoo
- My Way ft Headie One, Eugy, Medikal
- Tried & Tried ft NSG, Darkovibes
- Tonight ft Efya, WES7AR 22, Kofi Mole
- Do You ft Teezee, Nonso Amadi, Acebergtm
- So Amsterdam ft Boj, Mugeez, Diquenza
- 2000 ft Major League Djz, GuiltyBeatz, WES7AR 22, Uncle Vinny
- Paradise ft Alpha P
- Biou Biou ft Oxlade
- Holy F4k ft Black Sherif, VIC MENSA, Ivorian Doll, Kwaku DMC
- I Know ft Kuami Eugene, BNXN fka Buju
- Africa ft Mzvee, Terry Africa
- Holy F4k - Remix ft Yssi SB, Adje, Black Sherif

Wizkid ft small God - God of Mercy

==== Singles ====
- Kusuu ft Kweku Flick, ODUMODUBLVCK, Abra Cadabra (2023)
- GIDI GIDI ft Black Sherif, Tory Lanez (2022)
- Velletjes (Amapiano Remix) - Smallgod, Major League Djz, Rich2Gether (2022)
- My Way ft Headie One, Eugy, Medikal (2022)
- Holy F4k - Remix ft Yssi SB, Adje, Black Sherif (2022)
- Falling ft KiDi, Darkoo (2022)
- Holy F4k ft Black Sherif, VIC MENSA, Ivorian Doll, Kwaku DMC (2021)
- 2000 ft Major League Djz, GuiltyBeatz, WES7AR 22, Uncle Vinny (2021)
- Sinner ft Headie One, O'Kenneth, Kwaku DMC, Lp2loose (2021)
- Simple Instruction ft R2Bees (2021)
- Marry Me ft Harmonize (2021)
