= Fountain Baby =

Studio album by Amaarae
- Released: June 9, 2023
- Genres: R&B; Afrobeats; pop
- Length: 39:33
- Labels: Golden Child; Interscope

Amaarae chronology
The Angel You Don't Know (2020)	Fountain Baby (2023)	Black Star (2025)

Singles from Fountain Baby
- 1. "Reckless & Sweet" Released: March 17, 2023; 2. "Co-Star" Released: May 3, 2023; 3. "Wasted Eyes" Released: June 9, 2023; 4. "Angels in Tibet" Released: March 13, 2024

Fountain Baby is the second studio album by the Ghanaian-American singer Amaarae. It was released on June 9, 2023, via Golden Child Entertainment and Interscope Records. The album, released to widespread critical acclaim, was supported by four singles, "Reckless & Sweet", "Co-Star", "Wasted Eyes", and "Angels in Tibet".

The album went on to earn spots on multiple year-end best-of lists. In 2024, Amaarae expanded the project with Roses Are Red, Tears Are Blue – A Fountain Baby extended play, which was released on June 28, 2024 and introduced seven new tracks. Around the same time, she also featured alongside Jorja Smith on Childish Gambino's single "In the Night".

== Background ==
On her 2020 debut album The Angel You Don't Know, Amaarae embraced themes of desire and self-assuredness, presenting her "zaddy" persona with a genre-blurring mix of R&B, pop, and alté that highlighted her creative fearlessness. Following her global breakthrough with "Sad Girlz Luv Money" featuring Moliy—and its remix with Kali Uchis—Amaarae continued to develop her sound by blending diverse global influences into her signature Afrobeats-inspired style.

== Composition ==
Pitchfork described the lead single "Reckless & Sweet" as a subtler, more introspective take on Amaarae's signature style, blending soft drums and guitar with lyrics that explore emotional vulnerability and material tension. The review highlighted the track's biblical imagery and understated production as a contrast to her usual confidence.

== Singles ==
Following the lead single "Reckless & Sweet", Amaarae released the second single "Co-Star", accompanied by a star sign–themed music video directed by Lauren Dunn. Amaarae released a music video for the third single, "Wasted Eyes". Directed by Lauren Dunn, the video is set in a nightclub featuring a wall-to-wall fish tank. She later followed it with a vibrant visual for the fourth single "Angels in Tibet", directed by Yavez Anthonio, which features performances on stage and in ornate settings alongside dancers Hamly and Beaulexx.

== Critical reception ==
Professional ratings
Aggregate scores
Source	Rating
Metacritic	95/100
Review scores
Source	Rating
And It Don't Stop	A−
Clash	9/10
The Daily Telegraph	5/5 stars
Exclaim!	8/10
NME	5/5 stars
The Observer	5/5 stars
Pitchfork	8.7/10

Fountain Baby was released to overwhelmingly positive reception. Metacritic, a review aggregator, awarded a score of 95/100 based on eight critic reviews, indicating "universal acclaim".

Pitchfork named the record "Best New Music" with Julianne Escobedo Shepherd writing, "The Ghanaian American singer's dazzling second album is a confident and unconventional record that flows, saunters, and boasts its way to one of the best pop albums of the year." Tarisai Ngangura for NPR enjoyed the variety between songs and was impressed by the cohesive fusion of various genres.

Robert Christgau, reviewing in his "Consumer Guide" column, appreciated Amaarae's grounded gratitude for the same-sex obsession "she can afford" to have as a successful artist:

Her portion of fame proud and earned, her voice simultaneously fragile and self-possessed, her star-time comforts and advantages acknowledged without vanity or apology, she doesn't so much boast about her crushes, trysts, and conquests as lay them out lubriciously or matter-of-factly as the cherished rewards of a lifestyle I wouldn't be surprised to learn she's exaggerating ... she appreciates what she's got without taking it for granted, and without assuming there are no more chapters to her story.

In September, Rolling Stone listed the album as one of the best albums of 2023 so far.

=== Year-end lists ===
Select year-end rankings of Fountain Baby
Publication	List	Rank	Ref.
Slant	The 50 Best Albums of 2023	4	
The Line of Best Fit	The Line of Best Fit's Albums of the Year 2023	5	
Pitchfork	The 50 Best Albums of 2023	7	
NME	NME's Best Albums of 2023	8	
The New Yorker	Amanda Petrusich's Best Albums of 2023	9	
Crack Magazine	The Top 50 Albums of the Year	11	
Rolling Stone	The 100 Best Albums of 2023	26	
Exclaim!	Exclaim!'s 50 Best Albums of 2023	43	

== Track listing ==
Fountain Baby track listing
No.	Title	Lyrics	Music	Producer(s)	Length
1.	"All My Love"		Kyu Steed; Leonardo Dessi	Steed; Dessi	0:43
2.	"Angels in Tibet"	Ama Serwah Genfi; Mason "Maesu" Tanner; Emeka Emele Onuoha	Amaarae; Noah Glassman; Ayodeji "Cracker Mallo" Olowu; Kwame "KZ Didit" Kwei-Armah; Steed	Amaarae; Cracker Mallo; KZ Didit; Steed	2:23
3.	"Co-Star"	Genfi; Tanner	Amaarae; Steed; Dessi; Oliver "Cadenza" Rodigan; Tanner; Kwei-Armah	Amaarae; Steed; Dessi; Oliver "Cadenza" Rodigan; KZ Didit	2:47
4.	"Princess Going Digital"	Genfi; Tanner	Amaarae; Steed; Tochi Bedford; Kwei-Armah	Amaarae; Bedford; Steed^{[a]}; KZ Didit^{[a]}	3:09
5.	"Big Steppa"	Genfi; Tanner	Amaarae; Dessi; Ed Thomas; Tom Levesque; Kwei-Armah	Amaarae; Dessi; Ed Thomas; Tom Levesque; KZ Didit	2:57
6.	"Reckless & Sweet"	Genfi; Tanner	Amaarae; Alex Goldblatt; Rodigan; Kwei-Armah	Amaarae; Goldblatt; Cadenza; KZ Didit; Yves Rothman^{[a]}	2:40
7.	"Wasted Eyes"	Genfi; Tanner; Crystal Kay Williams	Amaarae; Phillip Kayode Moses; Robert James Perman; Steed	Amaarae; KZ Didit; Pheelz; Rothman^{[a]}; Stype^{[a]}	2:29
8.	"Counterfeit"	Genfi; Tanner; Olujuwon Prudholme	Amaarae; Steed; Kwei-Armah; Yahael Camara Onono; Pharrell Williams^{[I]}; Terrence Thornton^{[I]}; Gene Thornton Jr.^{[I]}; Stayve Thomas^{[I]}	Amaarae; KZ Didit; Steed	2:36
9.	"Disguise"	Genfi; Tanner	Amaarae; Steed; Olowu; Perman; Onuoha; Kwei-Armah	Amaarae; KZ Didit; Steed; Cracker Mallo; Rothman^{[a]}; Stype^{[a]}	2:50
10.	"Sex, Violence, Suicide"	Genfi; Tanner; Onuoha	Amaarae; Bedford; Oloyede "Dara" Oluwadarasimi; Bella Podpadec; Alice Go; Geordan Reid-Campbell	Amaarae; Dream Wife; Geo Jordan; Bedford; Rothman^{[b]}	4:13
11.	"Sociopathic Dance Queen"	Genfi; Tanner	Amaarae; Steed; Dessi; Kwei-Armah	Amaarae; Steed; Dessi; KZ Didit; Rothman	2:20
12.	"Aquamarie Luvs Ecstasy"	Genfi	Amaarae; Levesque; Glassman; Rayan El-Hussein Goufar; Malik "Venna" Venner; Kwei-Armah	Amaarae; Steed; KZ Didit; Rothman	4:39
13.	"Water from Wine"	Genfi; Tanner	Amaarae; Steed; Olowu; Kwei-Armah	Amaarae; KZ Didit; Steed; Cracker Mallo; Cadenza^{[a]}	2:36
14.	"Come Home to God"	Genfi; Tanner	Amaarae; Rothman; Christian Gregory; Michael "Quinn" Walford-Williams	Amaarae; Rothman; Gregory	3:20
Total length:					39:33

Roses are Red, Tears are Blue — A Fountain Baby Extended Play track listing
No.	Title	Length
1.	"Sweeeet"	1:52
2.	"Wanted" (featuring Naomi Sharon)	3:03
3.	"Jehovah Witness"	2:17
4.	"Diamonds"	2:37
5.	"This!"	3:05
6.	"THUG (Truly Humble Under God)"	3:53
7.	"Disguise" (Remix; featuring 6lack)	2:51
Total length:		51:11

Notes

- ^{^[a]} signifies an additional producer
- ^{^[b]} signifies a co-producer
- ^{^[I]} "Counterfeit" contains samples of "Wamp Wamp (What It Do)", written by Pharrell Williams, Pusha T, No Malice and Slim Thug, recorded by Clipse featuring Slim Thug.
