= Skillibeng =

Jamaican rapper (born 1996)

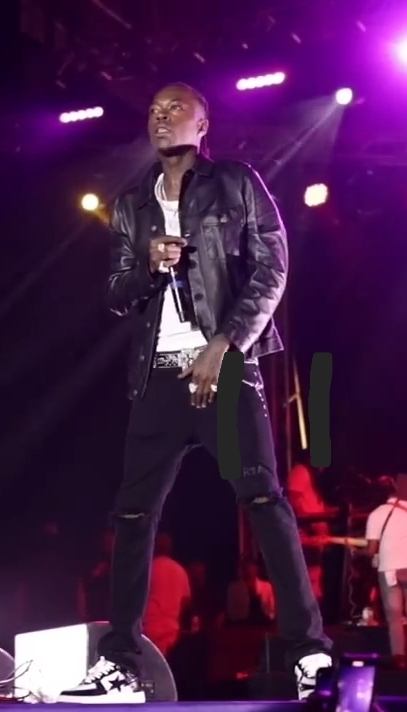
- Skilibeng performing at Unruly Fest in 2023

Background information
- Also known as: Eastside; Mr. Universe; Bad Every Day
- Born: Emwah Ryan Warmington; 23 December 1996 (age 29); Saint Thomas Parish, Jamaica
- Genres: Dancehall; trap
- Occupations: Singer; songwriter; rapper
- Instrument: Vocals
- Years active: 2015–present
- Labels: RCA; Eastsyde

Emwah Ryan Warmington (born 23 December 1996), known professionally as Skillibeng, is a Jamaican singer, songwriter and rapper noted for his works with Vybz Kartel, DJ Khaled, Sean Paul, Nicki Minaj, YoungBoy Never Broke Again, Wizkid, Rich the Kid, Kali Uchis, Popcaan, J.I the Prince of N.Y, Johnny Wonder, French Montana, and Moliy.

Skillibeng has released two EPs, one compilation and three albums: Prodigy (2019), The Prodigy (2020), The Prodigy, Ladies Only Edition (2021), Crocodile Teeth (2021), Mr. Universe (2022) and Eastsyde (2023). In 2020 and 2022, The Face and I.D. magazine profiled him as Jamaica's new dancehall hope and as Jamaica's hottest artist.

== Early life ==
Warmington was born in Saint Thomas Parish and grew up in the rural community of Lyssons.

== Career ==
Skillibeng is signed to RCA Records and Eastsyde Records. In October 2015, he released his first official single "Pain & Emotion", the same year he released his second single "Skilli She Love", with the radio edit released the same day. In August 2019, he released his 9-track debut extended play "Prodigy". In January 2020, Skillibeng released his 35-track debut studio album The Prodigy, the album debuted on the US Current Reggae Albums Chart and peaked at number 16. His second studio album The Prodigy: Ladies Only Edition was released on May 28, 2021. The same year, he released his third studio album Crocodile Teeth.

Skillibeng is the winner of Best Caribbean Music Act at the MOBO Awards 2022.

== Discography ==
Studio albums

- The Prodigy: Ladies Only Edition (2021)
- Crocodile Teeth (2021)

Mixtapes

- The Prodigy (2020)

Extended plays

- Prodigy (2019)
- Mr. Universe (2022)
- International (2025)

Singles

- Brik Pan Brik (2019)
- Crocodile Teeth (2020)
- Badman (2020)
- Bad Gyal [Divas] (with Vybz Kartel, Jucee Froot & Tommy Lee) (2020)
- Crocodile Teeth (Remix) (with Nicki Minaj) (2021)
- Stop The Talking (with Toian) (2021)
- blessing me (with Mura Masa & Pa Saileu) (2022)
- Slip N Slide (with Wizkid & Shenseea) (2022)
- Whap Whap (with F.S.) (2022)
- Unload (Reload) (with WSTRN) (2022)
- Forward From Trini (with Nicki Minaj & Skeng) (2023)
- 16CHOPPA (with Nardo Wick) (2023)
- Jump (with Tyla & Gunna) (2024)
- Shake It To The Max (FLY) [Remix] (with Moliy, Silent Addy & Shenseea) (2025)
- Getting Paid (with Sarz, Asake & Wizkid) (2025)
- Tip (Remix) (with Ayetian & Nvtzz) (2025)
- MINK SB (with JAE5, Skepta & Lojay) (2026)
- Ballerina (with Silent Addy, Rema & Disco Neil) (2026)
- So Phenomenal (with GuttyBling & Blizzi Gxd) (2026)
