= Pearl Akanya Ofori =

Ghanaian broadcast journalist

- Born: Pearl Akanya Ofori; 18 March 1984; Accra, Ghana
- Education: University of Ghana
- Alma mater: West Africa Secondary School
- Occupations: Broadcast journalist, Radio personality
- Years active: 2012–present
- Known for: Citi FM(97.3) (Radio) Ghana

Pearl Akanya Ofori (born 18 March 1984) is a Ghanaian broadcast journalist, radio personality and an entrepreneur who once worked for Ghanaian radio station Citi FM (97.3) Ghana. She is a graduate of the University of Ghana (Legon). She was nominated for the Radio and Television Personality Awards (RTP) organized by Big Event Ghana in 2015 Radio and TV Personality Award.

== Early life ==
Ofori began her early education at De Youngster's International School at Kokomlemle in Accra, and went on to attend the West African Senior High School in 2003. After her high school education, she attended the University of Ghana, Legon, where she offered a Program in Political Science, Psychology and Linguistics and majored in linguistics.

== Personal ==
Ofori was born in Ghana's capital, Accra, to Miss Grace Owusu and have two fathers- Rev. Joseph Akanya and Mr. Benson Owusu.

== Journalism career ==
Ofori was among few persons selected by radioUnivers, a campus-based radio station, to attend a radio training in Dakar, Senegal. In 2012, she joined Citi FM (97.3) Radio where she currently serves as a broadcast journalist.
