= Free The Youth =

Ghanaian fashion organization

Free The Youth is a crew of fashion entrepreneurs in Ghana formed in the year 2016 by Jonathan Coffie, Winfred Mensah, Richard Ormano and Kelly Foli . As the purpose of their initiative was well understood by their fellows, their initiative has grown to become a good brand across the globe. There are now of ten key players in the streetwear industry in addition to the founders. Among the ten key players are; photographer Philip N. Boakye, Design Advisor Mecha Clarke, NGO managers Asia Clarke and Sunshine Duncan, producer Prince Brefo and production lead Gilbert Quansah. Due to their rapid growth in the street wear revolution in Ghana, they have been rated alongside some African labels such as: Casablanca from Morocco, Modus Vivendii from Nigeria, OH OK from South Africa, Suave from Kenya, Daniks Peters from Ghana, Vieg Yuro from Angola and Their initial goal was to simply showcase some Ghanaian street-wear via social media. Their initiative has been developed into a two-pronged entity, the brand and the NGO. Both lend to the grand goal of making it possible for art-based, youth-oriented, sustainable programming.

== Location ==
This organization is located in the heart of Accra the capital city of Ghana. Their office also serves as a workshop, studio space and a general hangout for the team of fashion entrepreneurs at Free The Youth. Although now based in Accra, the label was formed in Tema, which is the harbor city closer to Ghana's capital that is known for its vibrant underground music scene, especially with the rapidly growing music community of the city of Tema.

== The Brand ==
The first collection produced by Free The Youth was in the fourth quarter of 2015. This included sweatshirts and t-shirts showcasing a titled brand across the chest with inscription "this pain is printed on cotton". This brand was showcased at Accra Fashion week 2017 creating a buzz and high demand for the products. The brand became more sought after by local Ghanaian artists like B4bonah and Amaarae, which gave Free The Youth a positive response and encouraged them to create more products. Ghetto University of Tema became site where the second collection from Free The Youth was shown in the fourth quarter of 2016. It had not been officially released, but it was seen worn by many popular artists in Ghana including BET award nominee for Best International Artist, Kwesi Arthur.

In the fourth quarter of 2017, Free The Youth played a role in the creation of music videos for the songs "Grind Day" by Kwesi Arthur, and "Mensah" by Kwesi Arthur and Kofi Mole in 2018. Free The Youth were known to hunt through fashion outlets seeking out the most noteworthy stuff to wear, which landed them a collaboration with Nike.

== The NGO ==
Free The Youth named their NGO after their best selling t-shirts to date, the Ghetto University, which was designed to institute the fulfillment of educational goals and long term sustainability of Free The Youth. Their objective was to create a shared work-space where youth will have access to information, support, tools and mentorship opportunities to grow an art skill of their choice. Another purpose of the NGO is to nurture young art creatives with employable skills and insight like graphic design, photography, screen printing, music production, interior design and other soft skills. The NGO is dedicated in encouraging youth to be broad-minded with the notion of art as a bona fide profession, and wants to provide adequate resources, support, tools and mentorship to Ghanaian youth for future success on the global phase.
