= T. Q. Armar =

Theophilus Quarcoo Armar (4 August 1915 – 2000) was a Ghanaian educationist, publisher and textbook writer.

== Early life and education ==
Born on 4 August 1915, Armar's early formative years were spent at the Government Boys' School, where he studied from 1921 to 1931. In 1933, he entered the Accra Academy for his secondary education and graduated in 1936 as the head prefect of the 1936 batch of students. Armar had his tertiary education at Southampton University from 1945 to 1947. From 1947 to 1948, he enrolled at the London University Institute of Education for a one-year course.

== Career ==
After completing his secondary education, he took up a teaching job at his alma mater; the Accra Academy. He was also put in charge of the school library from 1937 to 1945.

Upon completion of his tertiary education at the United Kingdom in 1948, Armar returned to the Accra Academy to resume his teaching duties. He remained a teacher of the school until 1956. For almost a year, Armar was the acting Assistant Headmaster of the Accra Academy. He was later Maintenance Officer and Senior Mathematics Master for the school. Armar left the Accra Academy in 1957 to join West Africa Secondary School. He spent about ten years in the school serving as the school's Headmaster and also Secretary of Conference of Heads of Day and Encouraged Secondary Schools in 1959. From 1961 to 1965, he served as the Secretary of the Conference of Heads of Assisted Secondary Schools (CHASS). He went on a voluntary retirement from the Ghana Teaching Service in December 1967, and in January 1968, he became the Ghana representative of Macmillan and Company Ltd.

For about six years (from 1962 to 1968), he was linked with the development of the New Mathematics, he was Chairman of the Advisory Committee on Schools' Broadcasts and Television until his voluntary retirement in December 1967. He was also worked as a Mathematics consultant for the Ghana Broadcasting Corporation.

Armar died in the year 2000.

== Works ==
Armar authored and co-authored many text books and teachers' books, some of which include; Objective Questions and Answers in Arithmetic for Middle Schools in West Africa, Modern Mathematics for Elementary Schools, Books 1–8, An Elementary Mathematics Course Books 1–6, and Teachers Books 1–6.

== See also ==
- List of Ghanaian writers
