= Offei (musician) =

Ghanaian singer

- Born: Derrick Offei-Awuku; March 22, 1993 (age 33); Tema, Ghana
- Genres: Afrobeats; R&B; AfroFusion
- Occupations: Singer; songwriter; record producer
- Instruments: Vocals, Guitar
- Years active: 2017–present

Derrick Offei-Awuku (born 1993) in Tema, better known professionally as Offei is a Ghanaian singer, guitarist, songwriter and philanthropist. Offei is popularly known for his hit single, 'Fi Mano' which features Nigerian reggae-dancehall singer, Patoranking.

== Early life ==
Born to Ghanaian parents, Offei hails from the Eastern Region of Ghana. He received high school education at Tema Senior High School and proceeded to study Medical Laboratory Science at the University of Ghana, Legon.

== Career ==
Offei has been doing music actively since releasing his debut single "Let It Go" in 2017. He has consistently released successive singles, including; "Communication", "Humanbeing" featuring Kwesi Arthur, "Body Whine", "LowKey", "Maria", "Santorini", "Fi Mano", among others. Each of these songs has enjoyed radio plays and has been part of credible playlists on all digital platforms across the world. In 2019, Offei signed a label management deal with US-based music company, Dwoods Productions.

== Discography ==
Singles
Song title	Year	Ref.
"Let It Go"	2017	
"Communication"	2017	
"Humanbeing"	2017	
"Body Whine"	2017	
"LowKey"	2018	
"Maria"	2018	
"Santorini"	2019	
"Fe Mano"	2020	

== Awards and nominations ==
Year	Event	Category	Recipient	Result
2020	Muse Bangerz Of the Quarter, (Half-Year Edition)	Introlude Song of the Quarter	Himself	Nominated
2021	3 Music Awards, Ghana	Next Rated Act	Himself	Nominated
