= Black Star (Amaarae album) =

Studio album by Amaarae
- Released: August 8, 2025
- Genres: Pop; highlife; dance-pop
- Length: 44:12
- Labels: Golden Child; Interscope
- Producers: Amaarae; Ape Drums; Bnyx; Brian Alejandro Lopez; Deepakz; El Guincho; Forthenight; Heavy Mellow; Kyu Steed; Leo Dessi; Mackson Kennedy; Maffalda; Mu540; Nuviala; WondaGurl

Amaarae chronology
Fountain Baby (2023)	Black Star (2025)

Singles from Black Star
- 1. "S.M.O." Released: June 20, 2025; 2. "Girlie-Pop!" Released: July 25, 2025; 3. "Fineshyt" Released: August 8, 2025

Black Star is the third studio album by Ghanaian-American singer Amaarae, released on August 8, 2025, through Golden Child Entertainment and Interscope Records. The album follows her critically acclaimed 2023 record Fountain Baby and takes a more playful approach, drawing inspiration from Ghanaian highlife, baile funk and dance music rooted in Black cultural heritage.

== Background and themes ==
Following the release of her critically acclaimed second album Fountain Baby in 2023, Amaarae spent the next two years performing at festivals and collaborating with various artists, including Janelle Monáe, Rina Sawayama and Childish Gambino. Her third album Black Star explores both her identity as a woman and as an artist. The title serves as a "triple entendre", referencing her Ghanaian heritage, her sense of self and the Black cultural origins of the dance music that influenced the record. Amaarae described the album as a "genesis of me feeling sure and confident". She also noted feeling a stronger connection to her Ghanaian audience during its creation. Unlike the more serious tone of Fountain Baby, Black Star sees the singer having more fun. Amaarae co-produced the album with longtime collaborator Kyu Steed, traveling to Brazil to work with baile funk producers. The project also features contributions from el Guincho and Bnyx.

The lead single, "S.M.O.", released on June 20, draws inspiration from Ghanaian highlife. Its music video was directed by Ghanaian filmmaker Omar Jones and is supposed to celebrate "beauty and power of the Black body", inspired by "Donna Summer mixed with Control era Janet", particularly the latter's "The Pleasure Principle" (1987) and the former's "Love to Love You Baby" (1975).

On August 8, 2025, the album Black Star was released, alongside the official music video for "Fineshyt".

== Critical reception ==
Professional ratings
Aggregate scores
Source	Rating
AnyDecentMusic?	7.3/10
Metacritic	83/100
Review scores
Source	Rating
Clash	8/10
The Guardian	4/5 stars
NME	4/5 stars
Pitchfork	8.8/10
Rolling Stone	4/5 stars

Black Star received widespread acclaim from critics. At Metacritic, which assigns a normalized rating out of 100 to reviews from mainstream publications, the album received an average score of 83, based on 9 reviews, indicating "universal acclaim". The review aggregator site AnyDecentMusic? compiled 7 reviews and gave the album an average of 7.3 out of 10, based on their assessment of the critical consensus.

Pitchfork's Walden Green awarded the album with "best new music" and 8.8 out of 10 rating, and wrote, "Black Star is the record you make when you can finally afford the best drugs and the suite with a view, lavish them on a lover (or several), and begin to ask yourself: Is this all there is?" Shaad D'Souza of The Guardian gave it four out of five stars rating and wrote, "It's fitting for an album that is deliriously in love with wealth, celebrity and all the power it affords. There is a difference between Amaarae and all the other stars fixated on such topics: for her, glamour is a side quest and love is the motive. Shopping at Saks and being passed another blunt might be nice, Amaarae seems to say, but the real high comes from finding someone to share it with."

== Track listing ==
Black Star track listing
No.	Title	Writer(s)	Producer(s)	Length
1.	"Stuck Up"	Ama Serwah Genfi; Jephte Steed Baloki; Mason Tanner	Kyu Steed; Mu540	2:31
2.	"Starkilla" (with Bree Runway and Starkillers)	Genfi; Austin Leeds; Brenda Mensah; Chad Hugo; Howie Hersh; Baloki; Tanner; Nick Terranova; Pablo Díaz-Reixa; Pharrell Williams; Tia Texada; Tyshane Thompson; Willem Faber	Kyu Steed; El Guincho	3:08
3.	"Ms60" (with Naomi Campbell)	Genfi; Charles Jr Ocansey; Ebony Oshunrinde; Baloki; Tanner	Kyu Steed; WondaGurl; Forthenight	2:28
4.	"Kiss Me Thru the Phone Pt. 2" (with PinkPantheress)	Genfi; Bob Robinson; Desmond Child; Baloki; Mark Andrews; Marquis Collins; Victoria Walker; Draco Rosa; Tim Kelley	Kyu Steed; Leo Dessi	3:38
5.	"B2B"	Genfi; Eric Alberto-Lopez; Baloki; John Smith; Keith Crouch; Tanner; Mechalie Jamison; Samuel Gause; Sarah Aarons; Toni Braxton	Kyu Steed; Ape Drums	4:17
6.	"She Is My Drug"	Genfi; Brian Higgins; Gonzalo Nuviala Pedruzo; Baloki; Tanner; Díaz-Reixa; Paul Barry; Aarons; Steven Torch	Kyu Steed; El Guincho; Nuviala	3:28
7.	"Girlie-Pop!"	Genfi; Arthur Pampolin Gomes; Deekapz; Everett Romano; Baloki; Mackson Kennedy Paiva do Amaral Borges; Tanner; Matheus Henrique Gonçalves dos Santos; Mike Mills; Paulo Vitor Araújo Guedes	Kyu Steed; Maffalda; Deepakz; Mackson Kennedy; Heavy Mellow	2:03
8.	"S.M.O."	Benjamin Saint Fort; Genfi; Baloki; Tanner	Kyu Steed; Bnyx	4:30
9.	"Fineshyt"	Genfi; Fort; Alberto-Lopez; Baloki; Tanner	Kyu Steed; Bnyx; Ape Drums	3:40
10.	"Dove Cameron"	Genfi; Brian Alejandro Lopez; Baloki; Tanner	Kyu Steed; Lopez	2:33
11.	"Dream Scenario" (with Charlie Wilson)	Genfi; Christopher Stewart; Baloki; Leonardo Dessi; Tanner; Terius Nash	Kyu Steed; Dessi	4:59
12.	"100Drum" (feat. Zacari)	Genfi; Gomes; Lopez; Baloki; Tanner; Mills; Zacari Moses Pacaldo	Kyu Steed; Lopez	3:44
13.	"Free the Youth"	Genfi; Edward Osei; Jasper Harris; Baloki; Tanner; Mills; Díaz-Reixa; Richard Akyeampong; Pacaldo	Kyu Steed; El Guincho; Amaarae	3:08
Total length:				44:12

Notes

- "Starkilla" contains an interpolation of "Milkshake" (2003), written by Chad Hugo and Pharrell Williams, as performed by Kelis; and an interpolaton of "Discoteka (Original Mix)" (2006), written by Austin Leeds, Howie Hersh, Nick Terranova, Tia Texada and Willem Faber; as performed by Starkillers.
- "Kiss Me Thru the Phone Pt. 2" contains an interpolation of "Thong Song" (2000), written by Bob Robinson, Desmond Child, Mark Andrews, Draco Rosa and Tim Kelley, as performed by Sisqó; and an interpolaton of "The Aisle" (2023), written by Victoria Walker, Dill Aitchison and Oscar Scheller, as performed by PinkPantheress.
- "B2B" contains an interpolation of "Maybe" (2000), written by John Smith, Keith Crouch, Mechalie Jamison, Samuel Gause and Toni Braxton, as performed by Toni Braxton.
- "She Is My Drug" contains an interpolation of "Believe" (1998), written by Brian Higgins, Stuart McLennen, Paul Barry, Steven Torch, Matthew Gray and Timothy Powell, as performed by Cher.
- "Dream Scenario" contains a sample of "Fancy" (2009), written by The-Dream and Tricky Stewart, as performed by The-Dream.

== Personnel ==
Credits adapted from Tidal.

=== Musicians ===
- Amaarae – lead vocals (all tracks)
- Bree Runway – vocals (track 2)
- Starkillers – vocals (track 2)
- Naomi Campbell – vocals (track 3)
- PinkPantheress – vocals (track 4)
- Charlie Wilson – vocals (track 11)
- Zacari – vocals (track 12)
- Jephte "Kyu Steed" Steed Baloki – producer, drums, bass, keyboards (multiple tracks)
- Wondagurl – production (track 3)
- Leo Dessi – co-producer (tracks 4, 11)
- Mackson Kennedy – co-producer (track 7)
- Heavy Mellow – co-producer (track 7)
- Forthenight – co-producer (track 3)
- El Guincho – co-producer (track 2)
- Mu540 – co-producer (track 3)
- BNYX – producer (tracks 8, 9)
- Brian Alejandro Lopez – producer (tracks 10, 12)
- Amaarae – co-producer (track 13)

=== Technical ===
- Jephte "Kyu Steed" Steed Baloki – executive production
- Noah "MIXGIANT" Glassman – engineering
- Brittney Orinda – engineering
- Salvador Majail – engineering
- Better Call Sal – engineering
- Bert – engineering
- Leandro Dro Hidalgo – mixing, mastering

== Charts ==
Chart performance for Black Star
Chart (2025)	Peak position
US World Albums (Billboard)	17

== Release history ==
Release dates and formats for Black Star
Region	Date	Format(s)	Label	Ref.
Various	August 8, 2025	CD; LP; digital download; streaming	Golden Child; Interscope	
