= $pacely =

Ghanaian musician

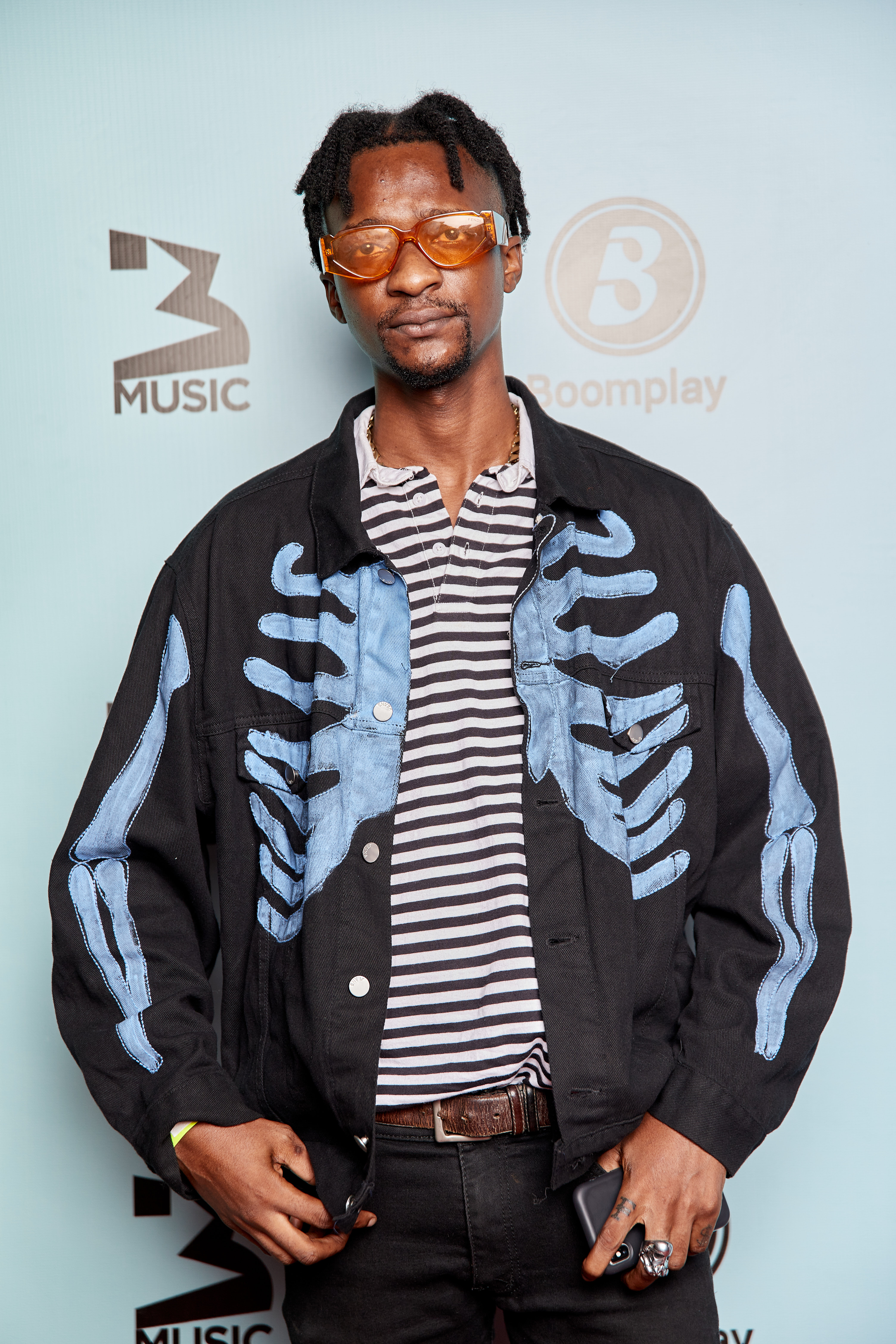

Background information
- Also known as: Keanu, Ad-lib King
- Born: Elorm Kabu Amenyah; 1 August 1992 (age 33); Accra, Greater Accra Region, Ghana
- Origin: Accra
- Genres: Hip hop, Afropop, Afrobeats, Afro-Trap
- Occupations: Singer; Songwriter; Performer; Rapper; Stylist
- Instruments: Vocals
- Years active: 2016-present

Elorm Kabu Amenyah (born 1 August 1992) professionally known as $pacely (pronounced Spacely) is a Ghanaian rapper and singer. He is a member of trap music collective La Meme Gang. He has collaborated with Kwesi Arthur, Nxwrth, RJZ, Pappy Kojo, Kiddblack, KwakuBS, Kofi Mole and Darkovibes. He released his debut EP Fine$$e or Be Fine$$ed in 2019, which features songs like "Somimu" and "Uber" featuring Cina Soul and Joey B. respectively.

== Early life and career ==
Upon relocating to Ghana in 2012, he formed a music group in high school with friend Art Soul Kojo, who is now a painter and an artist. $pacely is called the Ad-lib King by his peers and Keanu- a moniker he gained for his very popular song "Digits".

In 2016, $pacely met young Ghanaian Producer Kuvie. This led to the recording of his debut single "Love on Drugs". The single featured and was produced by now members of La Meme Gang- Darkovibes and Nxwrth.

Spending much time together in the creative tutelage of Villain Sounds studio formed a bond between him and five other musicians which led to the creation of the La Meme Gang collective. The name which translates as "The Same Gang" was coined by $pacely. After the release of their debut EP, they secured four nominations at the 2019 Vodafone Ghana music Awards.

In 2017, $pacely released "Digits", a heavy trap Nxwrth produced song. A remix to the song was later released which featured Ghanaian rapper Kwesi Arthur.

Alongside his La Meme Gang members, $pacely was featured in a Boiler Room documentary which spoke about the rich history of Ghanaian Culture and also sealed Boiler Room performance.

== Discography ==
=== EP ===
- 2019: Fine$$e or Be Fine$$ed

=== Singles ===
- 2019: Yawa
- 2019: Yenkodi
- 2018: Dit Moi
- 2017: Digits (Remix)
- 2017: Digits
- 2017: Ikechukwu
- 2017: Bad
- 2017: Scandalous
- 2017: Love on Drugs

=== Features ===
==== Albums ====
- 2018: La Même Gang- Linksters
- 2017: La Même Gang- La Même Tape

==== Singles ====
- 2019: Tulenkey- Little Soldiers
- 2019: Pappy Kojo- Blessing
- 2018: Joey B- Stables
- 2018: R2Bees - Boys Kasa
- 2018: Sarkodie- Homicide
- 2017: Joey B- Rock The Boat
- 2017: Magnom- Bam Bam

== Videography ==
Year	Title	Director	Ref
2017	Digits (Remix)	David Duncan	
2019	Ikechukwu	TwoSteps	
