= West Africa Senior High School =

West Africa Secondary School

Location
- P. O. Box LG 298, Adenta; Greater Accra Region; Accra; Ghana; 5°42′23″N 0°10′28″W

Information
- School type: Public High School Co Educational
- Motto: Faith, Industry, Wisdom
- Denomination: Non-denominational
- Established: 1946
- Founder: Rev. J. C. Tettey and Emmanuel Addo
- Head of school: Ofori Antwi
- Gender: Boys and girls
- Age: 12 to 18
- Houses: 5
- Colours: blue, red and yellow
- Slogan: gbotsui ....3mashi
- Nickname: WASS
- School fees: Regulated by Government

West Africa Senior High School (WASS) is a second-cycle institution located at Adenta in the Greater Accra Region of Ghana. The school is a government assisted, mixed day and non-denominational institution providing a three-year senior high school education. The school was founded in 1946 by Rev. J. C. Tettey and Emmanuel Addo.

== History ==
The school started in Tudu as the West Africa College of Commerce in 1946. In 1954, the school was absorbed into the public system as a Government-Assisted school.

=== Enrollment ===
West Africa Senior High School has a total students population of 1639 of which 49% are girls and 51% are boys.

== Alumni ==
- Kirani Ayat, rapper, singer and producer;
- Pearl Akanya Ofori of CitiFM
- Anass Mohammed Esq. Head of Legal & Human Resources: Federated Commodities PLC

== See also ==
- T. Q. Armar (former headmaster)
