= Nxwrth =

Ghanaian record producer and DJ

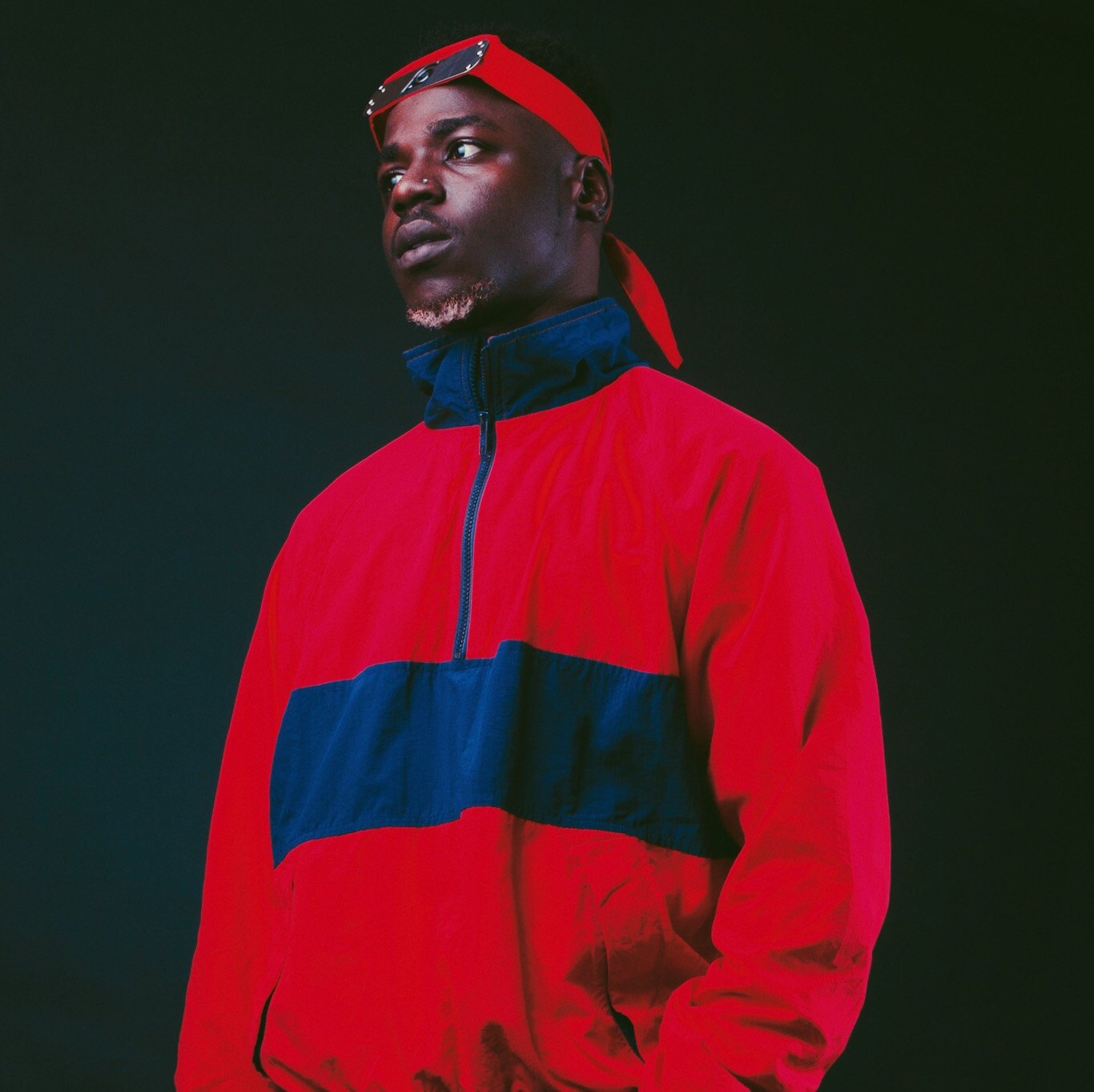

Background information
- Born: Ahmed Froko; Cape Coast, Central Region, Ghana
- Origin: Wa, Upper West Region of Ghana
- Genres: Hip hop, Afropop, Afrobeats, Afro-Trap
- Occupations: Record producer, Rapper, Sound Engineer
- Instruments: Keyboard, sampler
- Years active: 2016-present
- Label: Independent

Ahmed Froko professionally known as Nxwrth (Pronounced North) is a Ghanaian record producer, musician and DJ. He is one of the youngest producers on the Ghanaian music scene and used to be a member of trap music collective "La Meme Gang".

== Early life and career ==
Nxwrth is a Ghanaian record producer, musician and DJ who hails from Wa in the Upper West Region of Ghana.

He was born in Cape Coast and grew up in the city of Accra where he started producing and mastered the art of combining bass, drum machines and synths into hip hop, trap and afro-pop sounds at age 16.

In 2016, Nxwrth took part in a beat battled organized by Accra Dot Alt Radio and was adjudged the winner of the competition. He has also produced songs for most of the collective's group and solo releases over the past 3 years which earned them 4 nominations at the Vodafone Ghana Music Awards. Other major works of his include production on Ghanaian rapper Joey B's Darryl EP and also instrumental on Kwesi Arthur's "Pray For Me" single in 2019.

Nxwrth acknowledged the influences of a number of trap artists including Travis Scott, Wongadurl and Mike Dean in his work. In an interview for the website Ghana Music he said his music was inspired by 'space' and the 'extraterrestrial'.

Alongside other members of his former gang Kiddblack, RJZ, $pacely and Kwaku BS, Nxwrth was featured in a Boiler Room documentary on YouTube which highlighted the rich history of Ghanaian culture and described them as being unafraid of expressing themselves through their music.

== Discography ==
=== Singles ===
- "Mama" Nxwrth feat. Rjz & Darkovibes
- "Placebo" DarkoVibes & KiddBlack
- "Yaa Baby" Nxwrth feat. $pacely & KwakuBs
- "Sundress" Nxwrthfeat Nxwrth, $pacely, Darkovibes & Kiddblack
- "Godzilla" Nxwrth feat Darkovibes & Kiddblack
- "Cupid" Nxwrth feat Darkovibes
- "Above Average" Nxwrth feat. Sky Kuu & Kwesi Arthur
- "Back 2 Back" Nxwrth feat. KwakuBs,$pacely, Kuvie
- "Oh My Days" Nxwrth feat. KwakuBs, Hama, Kiddblack, Darkovibes and Kuvie
- "Burn" Nxwrth feat. Sky Kuu, Rjz and $pacely

=== Features ===
==== EPs ====
- Darryl EP (2017) by Joey B

==== Albums ====
- La Meme Tape (2017) by La Meme Gang
- La Meme Tape 2 (Linksters) (2018) by La Meme Gang
- NASA: Thanks For Flying (2020)

== Videography ==
Year	Title	Director	Ref
2018	Cupid Feat Darko Vibes	Bzdrko	
2019	Above Average Feat Sky Kuu & Kwesi Arthur	Bzdrko	
