= Shake It to the Max (Fly) =

2024 single by Moliy and Silent Addy

Single by Moliy and Silent Addy
- Released: 3 December 2024
- Recorded: 2024
- Genre: Afropop; dancehall; afrofusion
- Length: 2:07
- Label: Gamma
- Songwriters: Moliy Ama Montgomery; Neil Dyer; Adam Kevin Alexander
- Producers: Disco Neil; Silent Addy

Moliy singles chronology
"b2b" (2024)	"Shake It to the Max (Fly)" (2024)	"The Greatest Bend Over (Take It Easy)" (Remix) (2025)

Remix cover
- Cover of the remix featuring Skillibeng & Shenseea

Skillibeng singles chronology
"Shoot" (2025)	"Shake It to the Max (Fly)" (Remix) (2025)	"Favoured" (2025)

Shenseea singles chronology
"Puni Police" (2025)	"Shake It to the Max (Fly)" (Remix) (2025)	"V.I.P" (2025)

Music videos
- "Shake It to the Max (Fly)" (featuring Skillibeng & Shenseea; remix) on YouTube
- "Shake It to the Max (Fly)" (Kalash & Maureen Remix) on YouTube

Lyric video
- "Shake It to the Max (Fly)" on YouTube

"Shake It to the Max (Fly)" is a song by Ghanaian singer Moliy and Jamaican producer Silent Addy. It was released as a single on 3 December 2024. The first remix featuring Jamaican singer Shenseea and Jamaican rapper Skillibeng was released on 21 February 2025, and was included as the closing track of Moliy's mixtape Baddies <3 Moliy. The second remix titled “Shake It to the Max (Fly)” [Kalash & Maureen Remix] featuring Martinican rappers Kalash and Maureen was released on 14 March 2025. A third remix of the song by American electronic dance music and DJ trio Major Lazer titled “Shake It to the Max (Fly)” [Major Lazer Remix] was released on 16 May 2025. A fourth remix featuring Trinidadian dancer and singer Gladdest was released on 30 May 2025, titled "Shake It to the Max (Done with Ya Ex)". A fifth remix titled Shake It to the Max (Tuff Remix) featuring Jamaican singer and rapper Sean Paul was released on 11 July 2025.

The first remix went viral on video-sharing app TikTok following a popular dance challenge, leading to the song becoming an international chart success. The song became Moliy's highest-charting single in numerous countries worldwide including the United States, Canada, the United Kingdom, Germany, Austria, New Zealand and Switzerland. The fourth remix with Gladdest went viral as well on video-sharing app TikTok following a popular dance challenge before it was officially released, as Gladdest released her own freestyle version on YouTube on 22 March 2025 and it sparked a viral TikTok dance challenge, with over 2.5 million user-generated videos. The track has also amassed 4.5 million views on YouTube.

== Background ==
In October 2024, Moliy posted a snippet of the song on social media, triggering a global dance challenge and inspiring over 235,000 TikTok videos. The track’s widespread virality prompted Moliy to hold off on the official release until 3 December 2024, allowing organic momentum to build.

== Music videos ==
The music video for the Skillibeng and Shenseea remix was directed by Fernando Hevia. It was released on 15 March 2025. It was filmed at Ghana and Jamaica.

Another music video was released for the Kalash and Maureen remix on 23 April 2025. It was filmed and directed by DYNAMIC LAB, and includes both cinematic visuals of Moliy, Kalash and Maureen performing, and behind-the-scenes footage from their live performance at Accor Arena (Bercy) in Paris on 15 March 2025, where it was filmed at.

== Personnel ==
- Moliy – vocals, songwriting
- Silent Addy (Adam Kevin Alexander) – production, songwriting
- Disco Neil (Neil Dyer) – production, songwriting
- Dave Emery – Dolby Atmos, mixing, engineering
- Mark “Exit” Goodchild – mastering, mixing

== Charts ==
=== Weekly charts ===
Weekly chart performance for "Shake It to the Max (Fly)"
Chart (2025–2026)	Peak position
Austria (Ö3 Austria Top 40)	10
Belgium (Ultratop 50 Wallonia)	46
Canada (Canadian Hot 100)	24
Canada CHR/Top 40 (Billboard)	36
Czech Republic Singles Digital (ČNS IFPI)	54
France Airplay (SNEP)	14
Germany (GfK)	10
Global 200 (Billboard)	6
Hungary (Single Top 40)	27
India International (IMI)	4
Ireland (IRMA)	28
Israel (Mako Hitlist)	76
Jamaica Airplay (JAMMS)	6
Lithuania (AGATA)	25
Luxembourg (Billboard)	11
Malaysia (Billboard)	17
Middle East and North Africa (IFPI)	10
Netherlands (Dutch Top 40)	25
Netherlands (Single Top 100)	16
North Macedonia Airplay (Radiomonitor)	14
Philippines Hot 100 (Billboard Philippines)	93
Portugal (AFP)	112
Romania (Billboard)	22
Singapore (RIAS)	21
Switzerland (Schweizer Hitparade)	11
Turkey International Airplay (Radiomonitor Türkiye)	6
United Arab Emirates (IFPI)	6
UK Singles (Official Charts)	12
UK Afrobeats (Official Charts)	1
UK Hip Hop/R&B (Official Charts)	1
UK Independent (Official Charts)	2
US Billboard Hot 100	44
US Afrobeats Songs (Billboard)	1
US Hot R&B/Hip-Hop Songs (Billboard)	10
US Pop Airplay (Billboard)	18
US R&B/Hip-Hop Airplay (Billboard)	8
US Rhythmic (Billboard)	1
US World Digital Song Sales (Billboard)	1

Weekly chart performance for "Shake It to the Max (Fly) (Remix)"
Chart (2025–2026)	Peak position
Australia (ARIA)	43
Bulgaria Airplay (PROPHON)	10
Central America Anglo Airplay (Monitor Latino)	3
CIS Airplay (TopHit)	93
Costa Rica Airplay (Monitor Latino)	17
Croatia International Airplay (Top lista)	11
Dominican Republic Anglo Airplay (Monitor Latino)	6
El Salvador Anglo Airplay (Monitor Latino)	2
Estonia Airplay (TopHit)	79
France (SNEP)	22
Greece International (IFPI)	4
Guatemala Anglo Airplay (Monitor Latino)	10
Honduras Anglo Airplay (Monitor Latino)	3
Latvia Streaming (LaIPA)	11
Malta Airplay (Radiomonitor)	6
Moldova Airplay (TopHit)	3
New Zealand (Recorded Music NZ)	20
Nicaragua Anglo Airplay (Monitor Latino)	2
Nigeria (TurnTable Top 100)	43
Nigeria Airplay (TurnTable)	22
Norway (VG-lista)	67
Panama Anglo Airplay (Monitor Latino)	5
Peru Airplay (Monitor Latino)	14
Poland Airplay (OLiS)	84
Poland Streaming (OLiS)	50
Romania Airplay (UPFR)	4
Romania Airplay (Media Forest)	3
Romania TV Airplay (Media Forest)	16
Russia Streaming (TopHit)	74
Slovakia Airplay (ČNS IFPI)	47
Slovakia Singles Digital (ČNS IFPI)	25
Suriname (Nationale Top 40)	2
Sweden (Sverigetopplistan)	68

=== Monthly charts ===
Monthly chart performance for "Shake It to the Max (Fly) (Remix)"
Chart (2025)	Peak position
CIS Airplay (TopHit)	100
Moldova Airplay (TopHit)	6
Romania Airplay (TopHit)	8

=== Year-end charts ===
Year-end chart performance for "Shake It to the Max (Fly)"
Chart (2025)	Position
Austria (Ö3 Austria Top 40)	52
Belgium (Ultratop 50 Flanders)	183
Belgium (Ultratop 50 Wallonia)	131
Canada (Canadian Hot 100)	61
France (SNEP)	120
Germany (GfK)	65
Global 200 (Billboard)	114
Netherlands (Single Top 100)	77
Switzerland (Schweizer Hitparade)	65
UK Singles (OCC)	76
US Hot R&B/Hip-Hop Songs (Billboard)	27
US Rhythmic Airplay (Billboard)	18

Year-end chart performance for "Shake It to the Max (Fly) (Remix)"
Chart (2025)	Position
Moldova Airplay (TopHit)	166
Romania Airplay (TopHit)	48

== Certifications ==
Certifications for "Shake It to the Max (Fly)"
Region	Certification	Certified units/sales
France (SNEP)	Platinum	200,000^{‡}
New Zealand (RMNZ)	Platinum	30,000^{‡}
United Kingdom (BPI)	Platinum	600,000^{‡}
United States (RIAA)	Gold	500,000^{‡}
Streaming
Greece (IFPI Greece)	Gold	1,000,000^{†}
^{‡} Sales+streaming figures based on certification alone.^{†} Streaming-only figures based on certification alone.

== Release history ==
"Shake It to the Max (Fly)" release history
Region	Date	Format	Version	Label	Ref.
Various	3 December 2024	Digital download; streaming	Original	Gamma	
Various	21 February 2025	Digital download; streaming	Skillibeng and Shenseea Remix	Gamma	
Various	31 March 2025	Digital download; streaming	Kalash and Maureen Remix	Gamma	
Various	16 May 2025	Digital download; streaming	Major Lazer Remix	Gamma	
Various	30 May 2025	Digital download; streaming	Gladdest "Done With Ya Ex" Remix	Gamma	
Various	11 July 2025	Digital download; streaming	Sean Paul "Tuff" Remix	Gamma	
