= DJ Mic Smith =

Ghanaian DJ and entrepreneur

- Also known as: The Shutdown King
- Origin: Accra, Ghana
- Label: Shutdown Empire

Micheal Owusu known as DJ Mic Smith is an event, club, radio, mixtape and artist DJ and also an entrepreneur from The Republic of Ghana.

He currently holds 4 awards and 6 nominations; 2 awards with 4syte TV for DJ of the year, The Redbull club DJ of the year award, and Best Mixtape DJ with Ghana DJ Awards. Mic Smith is also the official DJ for EL signed to the highly successful Ghanaian record label BbnZ live.

== Early life ==
Micheal was born on February 23 in Accra as the youngest of 4 siblings. Raised in the busy part of town, He grew up in Awoshie attending the well recognized and prestigious school, Wesley Grammar School (popularly referred to as WES G) where he initially planned to pursue a career in journalism...

== Career ==
=== The Beginning ===
Mic began DJing by “accident” when looking for a job over 6 years ago, where he had an embedded passion for music and allowed this to take more of a forefront in his life than it had previously. At Hot fm (93.9) in the early stages of 2008, he started as a radio presenter who presented the entertainment news on the Drive Time Show hosted by Okyeame Quophi. Within a year of life in the media world. Mic began spinning, his talent was pushed to the next level, when he became resident DJ at one of the most recognised clubs in Accra, Rockstone's Office known to many as Django. Over the years he was the main focus entertainment at the club and his talent on the decks quickly earned him the nickname ‘The Shutdown King’ exposing him to many opportunities including national and international gigs.

=== Latter moves in his career ===
Mic has shared the stage with the likes of Sarkodie, Stonebwoy, Shatta Wale and more. In 2014, he was event DJ for Ghana's music awards ceremony, Vodafone Ghana Music Awards. He has also since featured on national TV, with a spot on the New Day morning show on the Tv3 network channel.

=== Mixtapes ===
Beyond the scope of his work at events and clubs, Mic is also a mixtape DJ, with recent releases including his Shutdown riddim release in collaboration with Yellow Moon Records which created a new way of Ghanaian DJs collaborating with artists. The riddim featured 12 individual tracks from the following Ghanaian artists: BET Best International Act Africa 2015 winner: Stonebwoy, MzVee, AK Songstress, Choir Master, Vybrant Faya, Eye Judah, Trigmatic, Mr. Eazi, Episode, Shatta Rako, Aphecktion and Mighty Faya. 2015 pre-birthday release- ‘Rushing’- featuring Kwaw Kese, ‘We Just Landed’ featuring EL, C-real, Stargo, Gemini and Joey B, ‘I no Get Time’ featuring Manifest, American Passport refix ft E.L. and one of his earliest mixtape releases called the ‘Da reminda’ featuring E.L and Scientific. The latter obtained an award for best mixtape DJ 2012 at the Ghana DJ awards 2013.

=== Radio ===
Off late, Mic was also made one of the host DJs on the youthful Ghanaian radio station, y (107.9) FM in 2014 having previously begun his radio career the previous year as one of the new hottest recruits on Live 91.9 Fm. He currently is on air with Kojo Manuel on the DrYve every Monday to Friday from 3 PM to 7PM .

== Discography ==
=== Singles ===
==== 2012 ====
- 'Da Reminda' ft E.L and Scientific

==== 2013 ====
- Go Ur Way' ft E.L and Edem

==== 2014 ====
- 'Tonga' (Dj Mic Smith intro) ft Joey B and Sarkodie
- 'I no Get Time' ft Manifest
- 'We Just Landed' ft C real, E.L, Joey B, Gemini and Stargo
- 'American Passport' (shutdown refix) ft EL and Joey B

==== 2015 ====
- 'Rushing' ft Kwaw Kese
- 'Shutdown riddim' ft Stonebwoy, MzVee, AK Songstress, Choir Master, Vybrant Faya, Eye Judah, Trigmatic, Mr. Eazi, Episode, Shatta Rako, Aphecktion and Mighty Faya

==== 2016 ====
- 'Olele' ft Zeal, Yaa Pono & Cabum
- 'Panda (Afro Urban Remix)' ft Teephlow & Desiigner
- 'Work (Afro Urban Remix)' ft Rihanna and KOJO CUE
- 'Love Yourself (Afro Urban Remix)' ft Adina & Justin Bieber

==== 2017 ====
- 'Dutty Wine' ft Itz Tiffany and Ceeza Milli
- 'Wild Thoughts (Afro Urban Remix)' ft DJ Khaled, Rihanna, Joel Orleans, Bryson Tiller

==== 2018 ====
- 'Yenkor' ft Kwesi Arthur
- 'Jama' ft Patoranking & Shaker

==== 2020 ====
- 'Juju' ft Ckay, Kweku Afro, T ́neeya, J.Derobie, Blaqbonez, Pappy Kojo

=== Mixes ===
2013

- Birthday Mix
- Afro explosion

2014

- Missile Riddim
- Made in Ghana Mix 2
- Shutdown Mix 2 (Afrobeatz)

2015

- Twenty fourteen Hits Vol 1
