= Kofi Mole =

Ghanaian hip hop and afrobeats artiste

- Also known as: Kofi Mole, Aposo Gangsta, Mole
- Born: Edward Kofi Agyemang Amoah; April 16, 1993 (age 33); Kumasi, Ghana
- Origin: Kumasi
- Genres: Hip hop, Afrobeats
- Occupations: Rapper, Singer, songwriter
- Years active: 2018–present
- Label: N.G.A

Edward Kofi Agyemang Amoah known by the stage name Kofi Mole, is a hip hop and afrobeats artiste from Ghana. He was born on April 16, 1993 in Kumasi, Ashanti Region. He was awarded the Next Rated Act at the 2019 3Music Awards held in Accra.

== Early life and education ==
Kofi Mole was born and raised in Kumasi and attended Armed Forces Senior High Technical School for his secondary education. He attended the University of Ghana to study Psychology but deferred because he had to pursue a career in music. Before he became a musician, Kofi worked as a barber to support himself.

== Music career ==
Kofi's passion to do music started when he was a kid. He released the lead single "Mensah" in 2018 which featured 2018 BET Awards nominee Kwesi Arthur and produced by Kayso, the record was released under NGA with support from a social media movement called GroundUp Chale. He was called up later in 2018 to feature on the most talked about hip hop song 'Biibi Ba' by Sarkodie. The song was nominated for the Best Hip hop Song and Best Edited Video at the 2019 Vodafone Ghana Music Awards. In addition to music, Kofi is also interested in fashion and is known to design his own clothes.

== Discography ==
=== EPs ===
- Spread the News (2017)
- Aposor Love (2019)

=== Selected singles ===
- Mensah
- Die Rich
- Chairman
- Biibi Ba (as featured act)
- Don't Be Late
- Bestie
- Public Service Announcement

== Award and nomination ==
Year	Event	Award	Nominated work	Result	Ref
2020	VGMA	Hip-Pop Song of the Year	Himself	Won	
2019	3 Music Awards	Next Rated Act	Himself	Won	
2019	3 Music Awards	Hip hop Song of the Year	Mensah	Nominated	

== Videography ==
Year	Title	Director	Ref
2018	Mensah	Yaw Phanta	
2018	Die Rich	Akwadaa Nyame	
2019	Don't Be Late	Yaw Skyface	
2019	Me Ne Woaa	Yaw Skyface	
