= Kirani Ayat =

Ghanaian rapper

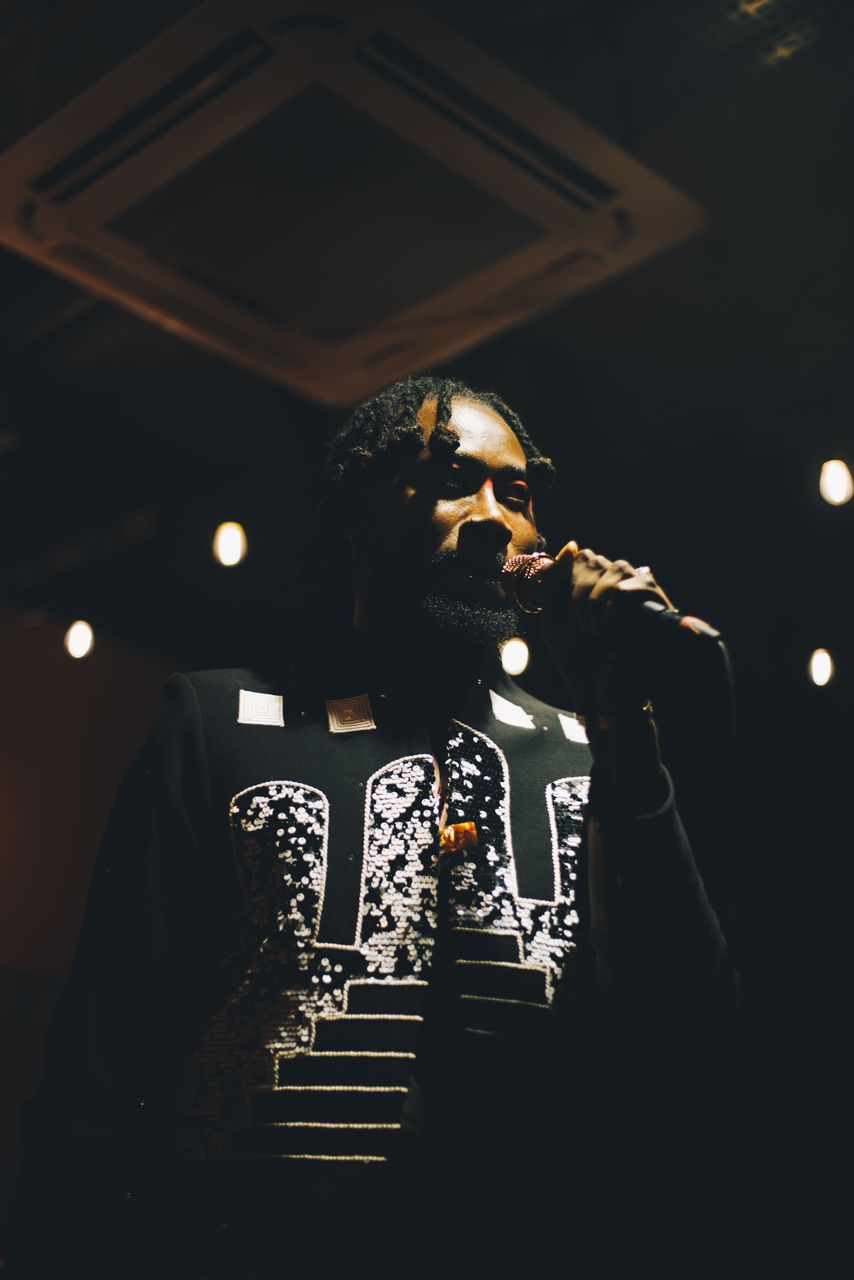
- Kirani Ayat performing at Jamestown Coffee House in October 2022

Background information
- Born: Ayat Maqwam Salis; 10 July 1990 (age 35); Madina, Ghana
- Genres: Afrobeats, Hip hop, Hiplife, Afro-trap, Afropop
- Occupations: Musician, rapper, singer and producer
- Instruments: Keyboard, sampler
- Years active: 2008–present
- Website: http://kiraniayat.com/

Ayat Maqwam Salis (born 10 July 1990), better known by his stage name Kirani Ayat, is a Ghanaian musician, rapper, singer and producer. Kirani Ayat started his music professionally as Mr. Ayat in 2008 and later rebranded to "Billy Banger" in 2010 during that period, where he recorded and released several mixtapes, which made a little impact locally. In 2011, as "Billy Banger" he recorded and released "aint easy", a hip-hop/RnB song which had an honorable mention in the Hip-hop category at the 2011 International Songwriting Competition out of over 17,000 entries. Kirani Ayat's hit records include "Kudi", "I Don't Know You (IDKY)", "Play For Keeps (SOYAYA)" and "Dodo".

== Early life and education ==
Kirani Ayat grew up in Madina, a suburb of Accra, Ghana. He first attended Madina Islamic JHS, where he completed his Junior Secondary School level education. He then gained admission into West Africa Secondary School for his secondary level education, where he started pursuing a professional musical career with the moniker "Mr. Ayat", before rebranding to "Billy Banger". After high school, he pursued Information Technology (IT) courses at IPMC and got admission into University, but dropped out later to pursue a full-time music career.

== Music career ==
In 2014, Kirani Ayat collaborated with Mal of Griotz Music and producer Mike Millz to release a joint EP titled "The TrapLife 2.0" EP. This was his last project under his "Billy Banger" moniker. This project received average reviews but gave him a lot of blog coverage and presence in the Ghana hip hop scene.

In 2015, Kirani Ayat then called "Billy Banger" decided to change his stage name to his original birth name Ayat, which means Life in Arabic. In a conversation with music reporters, Kirani Ayat confirmed the name change but emphasized that the rebrand was rather a transition into a new era for his growing music career than just a change of name.

In 2016, Kirani Ayat disclosed that he sold 85% of his belongings to make the inaugural edition of his MADFEST – an acronym for Music of African Descent Festival happen. MADFEST had an extensive list of budding and established hip-hop acts in the country gracing the show, including Akan, Worlasi, M.anifest, AJ Nelson, and Medikal.

In 2017, he released his widely anticipated debut EP, ZAMANI to critical acclaim. The Afro trap influenced EP had Kirani AYAT touching on the themes of hope, dreams, success, and love. And within a year, the 26-year-old has been featured in some of the biggest songs in the country. He worked with popular Ghana rappers: Sarkodie on Dodo, Medikal on 4get Everybody, Edem on the Egboame Remix and EL. on Bars.

In 2019, Kirani Ayat released "Her Vibe Is Right" EP. The seven-track extended play included collaborations with award-winning Ghanaian musicians Efya, Magnom, and Joeboy. The EP generally received positive reviews from most music critics for its notable tracks "HONEY" which featured Ghanaian musician and producer, Magnom.

In 2022, Kirani Ayat released his highly anticipated debut studio album titled "Aisha's Sun". The album featured Worlasi, Sarkodie & Morell. Production was handled by Sonnie KaySo Owusu, Altra N O V A, OKAIWAV, NiiQuaye Muses, AlmightyTrei & SELVSSE. The album served as a chronicle of Ayat's life, documenting his journey from adolescence to adulthood.

The tracks on "Aisha's Sun" delved into various aspects of Kirani Ayat's life and experiences. For instance, the song "Aisha's Son" reflected on his upbringing, while his collaboration with Worlasi on the song "Fada Na" addressed societal issues. "Duniya" and "Dan Kasa" explored themes of family and religion, while "Sarki" and "GUDA" touched on his aspirations and ambitions.

The album generally received positive reviews from most music critics for its rich cultural influences, lyrical depth, and Kirani Ayat's versatile vocal performances.

== Discography ==
=== Albums ===
- Aisha's Sun 2022

=== Extended Plays ===
- TrapLife 2.0 with Mal – 2015
- Zamani EP – 2017
- Her Vibe Is Right – 2019

== Singles ==
- Honey feat. Camidoh x Magnom – 2018
- IDKY (with Kayso) – 2014
- My Girl (with Kayso) – 2015
- Let Then Know (with Kayso) – 2015
- Dodo ft Sarkodie – 2016
- Forget Everybody ft Medikal – 2016
- Kudi ft M.anifest – 2017
- Di Asa – 2018
- Guda – 2018

== World tours and notable performances ==
Kirani Ayat started off the year 2017 with a tour to the United States. This was to promote his new song by then debut EP "ZAMANI". Ayat first landed in Los Angeles at The Airliner in Downtown LA. He then continued to East coast.

== Awards and nominations ==
Honorable mention in the Hip hop category at the International Songwriting Competition out of over 17,000 entries. At the 2019 Vodafone Ghana Music Awards, Kirani Ayat's video for his "Guda" single which was directed by David Nico-Sey got a nomination for Best Video of the Year. The video for "Guda" also received a nomination at 3Music Awards 2019:

On 17 November 2019, Kirani Ayat won the Overall Best Video Award with his "Guda" hit track at 4SyteTV Music Video Awards 2019.

== Controversy ==
On 27 September 2022, Kirani Ayat became embroiled in a controversy regarding the unauthorized use of his music video 'Guda' for promotional purposes by the Ghanaian government's tourism industry. He expressed disappointment that his video was used without his consent, despite his previous attempts to collaborate with the Ministry of Tourism for promoting tourism in the Northern region using his video. The issue sparked discussions about copyright infringement and proper permission for artistic works. In a video shared on President Akufo-Addo's Twitter handle, excerpts from Kirani Ayat's 'Guda' music video were used as promotion for Ghana's tourism industry. This utilization of his work without his consent led Kirani Ayat to address the issue through a series of tweets that quickly went viral. He expressed his disappointment that the Ministry of Tourism did not respond to his previous attempts to collaborate on promoting tourism in the Northern region using his video.

The director of the 'Guda' music video, David Nicol-Sey, also expressed frustration at the lack of due diligence by the Government of Ghana in obtaining proper permission for using the video.

In response, the Ghana Tourism Authority issued a statement, shifting the blame to SAMSAL Company Limited, an advertising firm, for the copyright infringement. However, SAMSAL denied responsibility for the copyright blunder in their own statement.

Support and encouragement for Kirani Ayat poured in from Ghanaians and celebrities alike, urging him to pursue legal action against the government for copyright infringement. Kirani Ayat expressed gratitude for the support he received in his fight for justice.

Ghana has previously undertaken successful tourism initiatives, such as the "Year of Return" launched in 2019, aimed at promoting the country to visitors from around the world.
