= Darkovibes =

Ghanaian musician

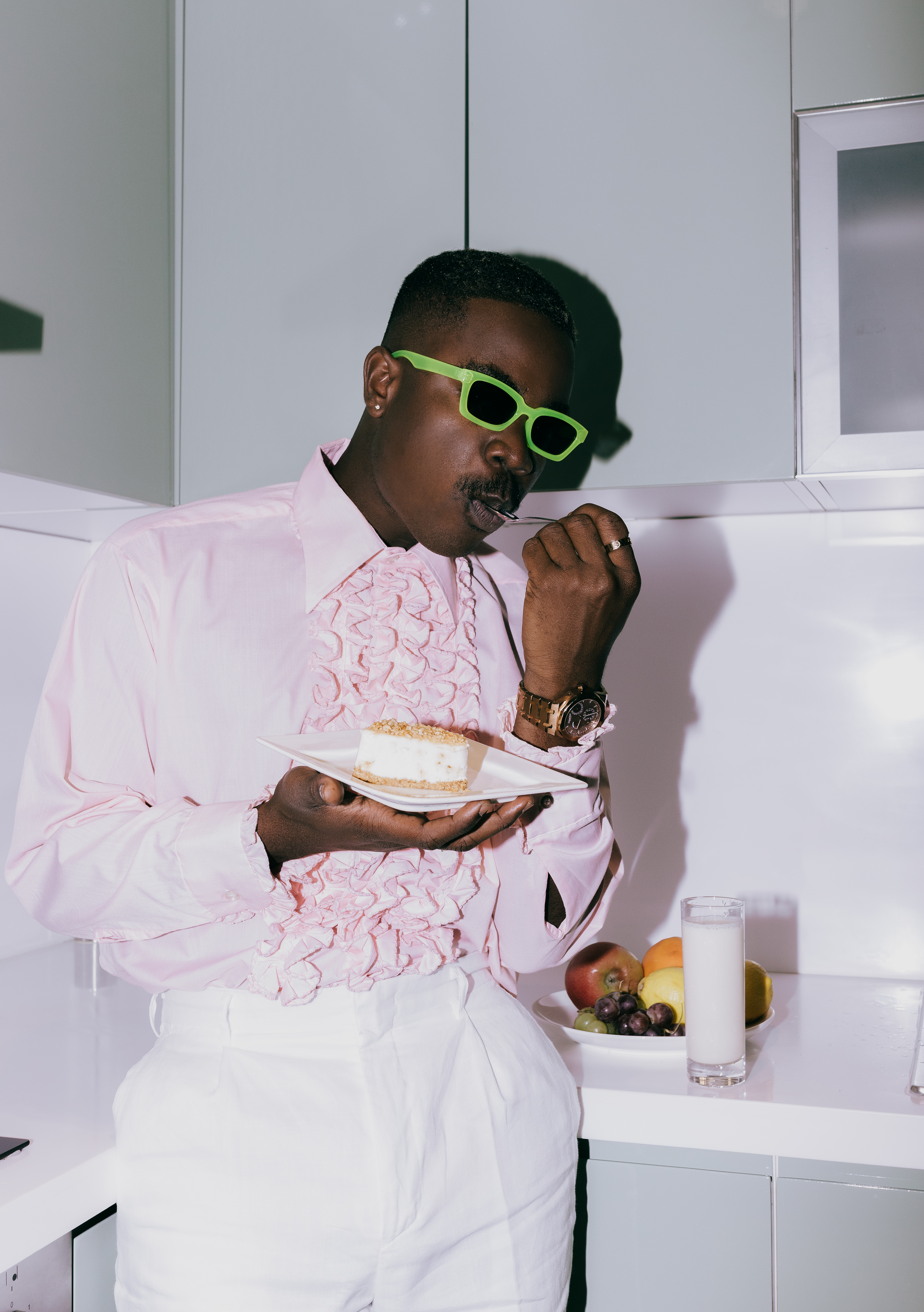
- Darkovibes for Notion Magazine

Background information
- Also known as: Poseidon with the wave
- Born: Paul Nii Amu Andrew Darko; Apapa, Labone, Accra, Greater Accra Region, Ghana
- Origin: Labone
- Genres: Hip hop, Afropop, Afrobeats, Afro-Trap
- Occupations: Singer, Songwriter, Performer, Rapper, Stylist
- Instrument: Vocals
- Years active: 2012-present

Paul Nii Amu Andrew Darko (born 1995) known as Darkovibes, is a Ghanaian born singer songwriter. His music categorizes as experimental music where he blends highlife, hip hop and rap. Darkovibes is known for his 2016 single "Mercy".

== Early life and career ==
He earned recognition as a nominee in the hip hop song of the year category at the Ghana Music Awards 2017 for his feature on Edem’s hit ‘Egboame’ the Remix.

== Collaborations and influences ==
Darkovibes has collaborated with artists including Omar Sterling of R2bees, Joey B, Edem, Efya, Magnom, Vacs (Music Producer), Pheelz Mr. Producer from Nigeria, and Kuvie (Music Producer). In 2016, he worked with MTN Ghana by writing and performing the theme song for the MTN Pulse Campaign.

As a member of the creative collective, La Meme Gang, he has collaborated with all the other members, namely, Kiddblack, Nxwrth(no longer part), RJZ, $pacely and Kwaku BS(no longer part). La Meme Gang released their first collaborative studio tape, La Meme Tape, in 2017.

== Fashion style ==
In 2017, Darkovibes, among a few others, was picked by Vogue Magazine UK to describe his distinctive style in music and fashion at Ghana's annual art and culture festival – ‘Chalewote’.

His fashion sense infuses unique fashion styles of colored hairstyles, side bags and fashion elements from the 80's.

== Discography ==
=== Album ===
- Kpanlogo (2020)
- Butifly (2023) *

=== Singles ===
- Bo Nor (2018)
- Shutdown (2017)
- Placebo (2017)
- Tomorrow (2017)
- Mercy (2016)
- Shuga (2016)
- Siamese (2016)

=== Features ===
==== Albums ====
- Joey B- Darryl EP (2017)
- Magnom- We Speed (2017)
- La Meme Gang- La Meme Tape (2017)
- PAQ- The Afrobeat Tape (2017)
- Dblack- Hunger & Thirst (2018)
- EL- WAV (2018)

==== Singles ====
- KiDi - Bless Me (2019)
- Stonebwoy - Stay Woke (2018)
- Nxwrth - Sundress (2019)
- Ayat - Bangers (2018)
- Edem - Egboame (Remix) (2017)
- $pacely - Ikechukwu (2017)

== Videography ==
Year	Title	Director	Ref
2017	Darkovibes - Tomorrow (Official Video)	Darkovibes & Babs	
2017	Darkovibes & Kiddblack - Placebo (Official Video)	KTO, Darkovibes & Kiddblack	

== Awards and nominations ==
Year	Organization	Award	Nominated work	Result
2020	Vodafone Ghana Music Awards	Afrobeats Song of the Year	Bless Me	Nominated
2021	Vodafone Ghana Music Awards	Best Afrobeats/Afropop Song	Inna Song	Nominated
2021	Vodafone Ghana Music Awards	Best Afrobeats/Afropop Artiste	Inna Song	Nominated
2021	Vodafone Ghana Music Awards	Vodafone Most Popular Song of the Year	Inna Song	Nominated
2021	Vodafone Ghana Music Awards	Album of the Year	Kpanlogo	Nominated
2024	3Music Awards	Album of the Year	Butifly	Nominated
