= Sad Girlz Luv Money =

- Remix cover

Single by Amaarae featuring Moliy

from the album The Angel You Don't Know
- Released: November 2020 (original); September 16, 2021 (remix)
- Genre: Pop; Afrobeat; R&B
- Length: 3:16 (original version); 3:24 (remix version)
- Label: Golden Child; Platoon; 0207; Interscope; Golden Angels
- Songwriters: Ama Serwah Genfi; Molly Ama Montgomery; Onaduja Reuben Yinka
- Producer: Onaduja Reuben Yinka

Amaarae singles chronology
"Fancy" (2020)	"Sad Girlz Luv Money" (2020)	"Leave Me Alone" (2020)

Music video
- "Sad Girlz Luv Money" on YouTube

Moliy singles chronology
"Deja Vu" (2021)	"Sad Girlz Luv Money" (2021)	"Love Doc" (2022)

Kali Uchis singles chronology
"Drugs N Hella Melodies" (2021)	"Sad Girlz Luv Money" (Remix) (2021)	"Fue Mejor" (2021)

Audio video
- "Sad Girlz Luv Money (Remix)" on YouTube

"Sad Girlz Luv Money" (stylized in all caps) is a song by Ghanaian-American singer Amaarae and Ghanaian singer Moliy, released as a single in 2020 from Amaarae's debut album The Angel You Don't Know. It achieved viral popularity on TikTok after a remix with Colombian singer Kali Uchis was released on September 16, 2021, appearing on various international charts, including reaching number 80 on the US Billboard Hot 100.

== Composition and lyrics ==
"Sad Girlz Luv Money" is an pop, Afrobeat and R&B song that talks about "money as a means of personal growth and how sometimes one can't control the desire to dance".

== Charts ==
Chart performance for "Sad Girlz Luv Money" (Remix)
Chart (2021)	Peak position
Austria (Ö3 Austria Top 40)	49
Canada Hot 100 (Billboard)	48
Czech Republic Singles Digital (ČNS IFPI)	74
Germany (GfK)	64
Global 200 (Billboard)	26
India International Singles (IMI)	7
Ireland (IRMA)	28
Lithuania (AGATA)	3
Netherlands (Single Top 100)	55
New Zealand (Recorded Music NZ)	29
Portugal (AFP)	13
Slovakia (Singles Digitál Top 100)	30
South Africa (RISA)	42
Sweden Heatseeker (Sverigetopplistan)	11
Switzerland (Schweizer Hitparade)	18
UK Singles (Official Charts)	29
UK Independent (Official Charts)	4
US Billboard Hot 100	80
US Rhythmic Airplay (Billboard)	28
US World Digital Song Sales (Billboard)	5

== Certifications ==
Certifications for "Sad Girlz Luv Money"
Region	Certification	Certified units/sales
Canada (Music Canada)	Platinum	80,000^{‡}
France (SNEP)	Gold	100,000^{‡}
New Zealand (RMNZ)	Platinum	30,000^{‡}
Poland (ZPAV)	Gold	25,000^{‡}
Portugal (AFP)	Gold	5,000^{‡}
United Kingdom (BPI)	Gold	400,000^{‡}
United States (RIAA)	Platinum	1,000,000^{‡}
^{‡} Sales+streaming figures based on certification alone.

== Release history ==
Release dates and formats for "Sad Girls Luv Money"
Region	Date	Format(s)	Label(s)	Ref.
Various	September 16, 2021	Digital download; streaming	Golden Child; Platoon; 0207; Interscope; Golden Angels	
United States	January 11, 2022	Rhythmic radio	Platoon; Interscope	
