= Moliy =

Ghanaian singer-songwriter (born 2001)

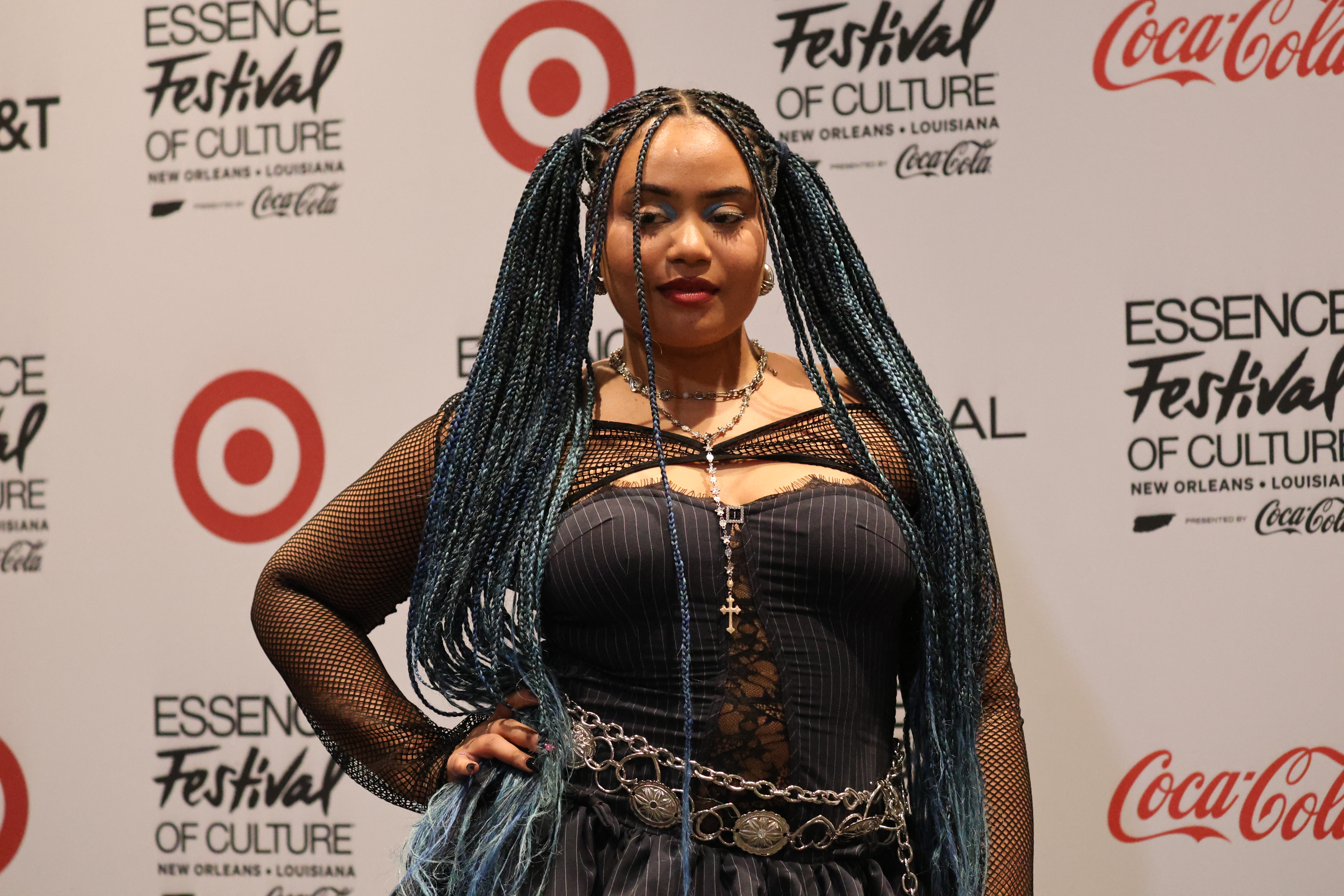
- Moliy in 2025
- Born: Moliy Ama Montgomery; 4 October 2001 (age 25); Accra, Ghana
- Occupations: Singer; songwriter
- Years active: 2020–present
- Musical career
- Genres: Afrobeats; Alté; Afro-fusion; Dancehall
- Labels: Gamma; Wondergirl & Co
- Website: moliymusic.com

Moliy Ama Montgomery (born 4 October 2001) is a Ghanaian-American singer-songwriter. She rose to stardom after her 2021 collaborative single with Amaarae "Sad Girlz Luv Money" (featuring Kali Uchis) became a chart success, debuting at number 80 on the US Billboard Hot 100 and peaking at number 29 in the United Kingdom.

== Early life ==
Moliy was born and brought up in Accra, Ghana. She spent time in both Ghana and the United States during her upbringing. She moved to the United States for college but later returned to Ghana in 2019, citing difficulties with adjusting to academic and financial pressures abroad. Her decision to return was followed by the start of her music career in Ghana. She moved to Florida in 2021. In interviews, she has discussed how her early creative efforts included sharing freestyles and original material on social media platforms. These activities eventually contributed to her recognition in the local music scene.

== Career ==
Moliy has stated that her songwriting often reflects personal experiences and observations. She has also addressed topics related to identity and artistic independence in several public interviews. In 2020, Moliy released her debut EP Wondergirl, which gained airplay in The Gambia and Nigeria as well as Kenya.

In 2024, Moliy released "Shake It to the Max (Fly)" with the Jamaican-born producer Silent Addy. The song gained traction on TikTok, and charted in the United Kingdom at number one on the UK Afrobeats Singles Chart and number 13 on the UK singles chart, making it her second hit single.

In early 2025, a remix version of “Shake It To The Max (FLY)”, featuring Silent Addy, Shenseea, and Skillibeng crossed over a billion streams making her the first non-Caribbean artist to reach such a feat.

== Discography ==
=== Mixtapes ===
- 2026: Baddies Love Moliy

=== Extended plays ===
- 2020: Wondergirl
- 2022: Honey Doom

=== Singles ===
==== As lead artist ====
List of charted singles, with selected chart positions and certifications, showing year released and album name
Title	Year	Peak chart positions												Certifications	Album
Title	Year	US	US Afro	AUT	CAN	GER	IRE	NLD	NZ	SWI	UK	UK Afro	WW	Certifications	Album
"Sad Girlz Luv Money" (Amaarae featuring Kali Uchis and Moliy)	2021	80	—	49	48	64	28	55	29	18	29	—	26	RIAA: Platinum; BPI: Gold; MC: Platinum; RMNZ: Platinum	The Angel You Don't Know
"Prisoner" (with P.Priime)	2022	—	—	—	—	—	—	—	—	—	—	—	—		Honey Doom
"Love Doc"	2022	—	—	—	—	—	—	—	—	—	—	—	—		Honey Doom
"The Place"	2022	—	—	—	—	—	—	—	—	—	—	—	—		Non-album single
"Hard" (featuring Moonchild Sanelly)	2022	—	—	—	—	—	—	—	—	—	—	—	—		Honey Doom
"Shake It to the Max (Fly)" (with Silent Addy or remix with Skillibeng and Shenseea)	2024	44	1	10	24	10	28	16	20	11	12	1	6	RIAA: Gold; BPI: Platinum; RMNZ: Platinum	Non-album singles
"The Greatest Bend Over" (Remix) (with Full Blown, Yung Bredda & Chlöe)	2025	—	—	—	—	—	—	—	—	—	—	—	—		Non-album singles
"Johnny" (with SadBoi)	2025	—	—	—	—	—	—	—	—	—	—	—	—		Non-album singles
"No Bad Vibes" (Remix) (with Jazzy, KILIMANJARO & Darkoo)	2025	—	—	—	—	—	—	—	—	—	—	—	—		Non-album singles
"Body Go" (with Tyla)	2025	–	8	–	–	–	–	–	–	–	–	2	–		Baddies <3 Moliy
"Nice n' Sweet" (with Ciara & Oxlade)	2025	—	—	—	—	—	—	—	—	—	—	—	—		CiCi (Deluxe)
"Goodboy (Kweku)" (with Melissa, Joey B & Chopstix)	2025	—	—	—	—	—	—	—	—	—	—	—	—		Non-album single
"Backie"	2025	—	—	—	—	—	—	—	—	—	—	—	—		Baddies <3 Moliy
"What I Like" (with Rvssian, Ayetian & Tyga)	2026	—	—	—	—	—	—	—	—	—	—	—	—		Non-album single
"Partygyal" (with bees & honey)	2026	—	—	—	—	—	—	—	—	—	—	—	—		Baddies <3 Moliy
"Jetski (Friki)" (featuring Yailin La Más Viral and Theodora)	2026	—	—	—	—	—	—	—	—	—	—	—	—		Baddies <3 Moliy
"911 (Call The Law)"	2026	—	—	—	—	—	—	—	—	—	—	—	—		Baddies <3 Moliy

== Awards and nominations ==
Year	Award	Category	Nominee(s)/Work(s)	Result	Ref.
2026	iHeartRadio Music Awards	Best New Hip-Pop Artist	Herself	Nominated	
2026	iHeartRadio Music Awards	World Artist of the Year	Herself	Won	
2026	iHeartRadio Music Awards	Best Music Video	"Shake It to the Max (Fly) (Remix)" (with Shenseea, Skillibeng, and Silent Addy)	Nominated	
2026	American Music Awards	Best Afrobeats Artist	Herself	Nominated	
