= Kwesi Arthur =

Ghanaian rapper and singer (born 1999)

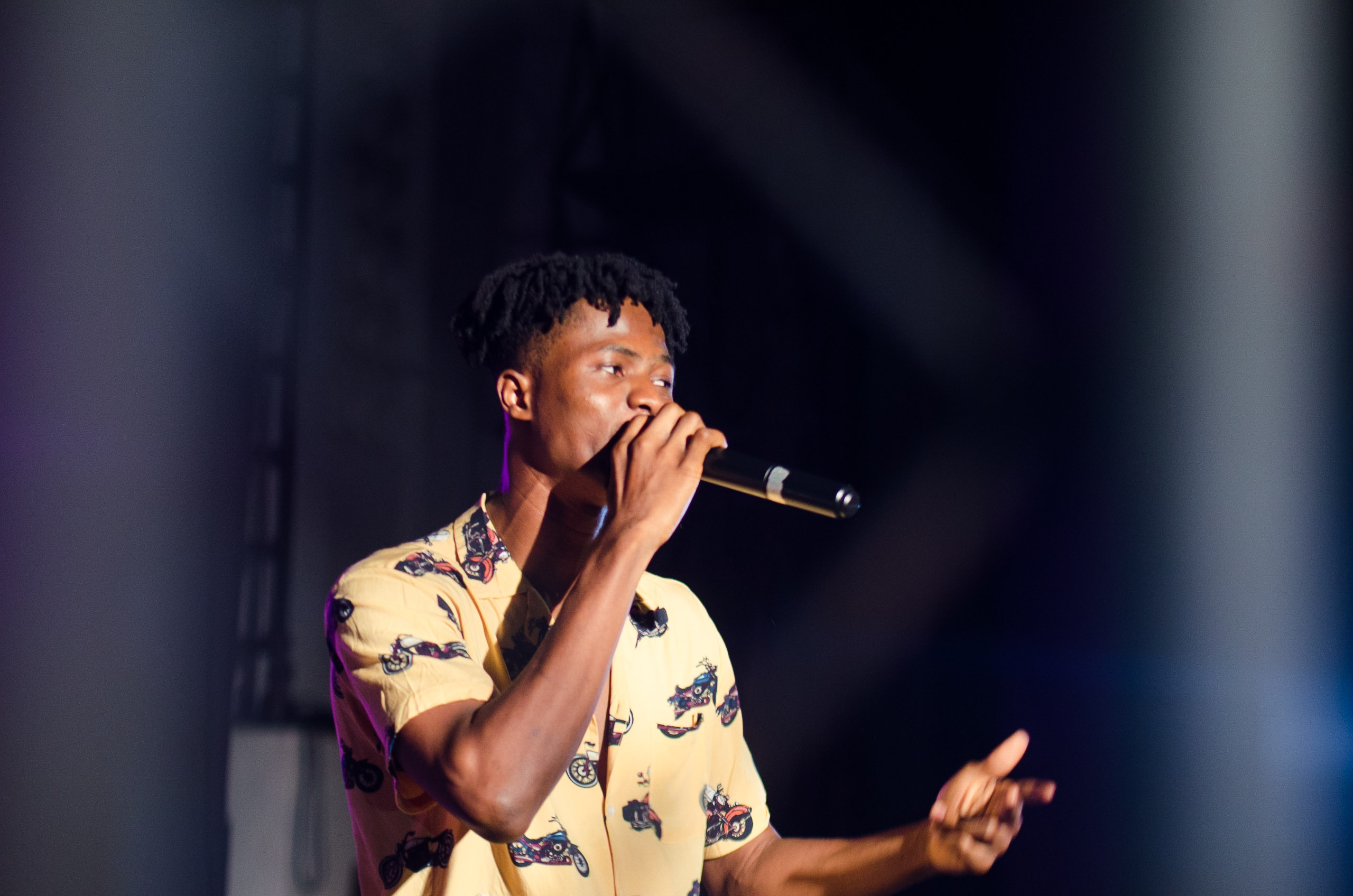
- Kwesi Arthur performing at Alliance Francais.

Background information
- Also known as: King Arthur, Diidaday, Heavy Hitta, Young Arthur
- Born: Emmanuel Kwesi Danso Arthur Junior; 18 December 1994 (age 31); Tema, Ghana
- Origin: Ghana
- Genres: Hip hop, Afrobeats
- Occupation: Rapper • singer-songwriter • record producer
- Years active: 2017–present
- Label: independent

Emmanuel Kwesi Danso Arthur (born 18 December 1999), known professionally as Kwesi Arthur, is a Ghanaian rapper, singer and songwriter from Tema. He rose to fame in 2017 with the hit single "Grind Day", which received widespread acclaim, a co-sign and a chart-topping remix from rap heavyweights Sarkodie and Medikal. In 2019, his second EP, Live from Nkrumah Krom Vol II, garnered more than 2 million streams in the first week of its release.

Arthur has won several accolades, including Rapper of the year and Hip Hop Song of the year at the Vodafone Ghana Music Awards as well as a Viewer's Choice Best International Act nomination at the 2018 BET Awards. He became the second Ghanaian rapper to be nominated for BET Hip Hop Awards Cypher after Sarkodie's nomination in 2019.

== Early life and education ==
Kwesi Arthur was born on 18 December 1994 in Tema. He was raised in Tema Community 9 and is the second of four children with a brother named Benjamin Danso Arthur, who is popularly known as Dayonthetrack and is also a musician. After completing his high school education at Temasco in 2013, Kwesi's plans of furthering his education to study psychology and law at the University of Ghana came to a standstill due to a lack of funds. This led the rapper to consider a job offer as a security guard in Tema.

== Music career ==
Kwesi Arthur was discovered by Ghanaian rapper and entrepreneur Sarkodie, whom he featured on one of his hit songs called "Grind Day", alongside Medikal.

Kwesi Arthur started writing raps after listening to Drake's debut album, Thank Me Later.

In 2017, he released the lead single "Grind Day" from his debut EP, Live from Nkrumah Krom (2017). The record was released under his independent outfit and supported by a social movement called GroundUp Chale. He later released the remix for "Grind Day", featuring Sarkodie and Medikal.

Kwesi Arthur has collaborated with numerous Ghanaian musicians, including Sarkodie, Medikal, KiDi, Jason E LA, R2Bees, B4bonah, M3dal, M.anifest, EL, Stonebwoy, Shatta Wale and South African rapper Nasty C and other musicians like Kofi Mole song title Mensah . He was nominated for Best International Act at the 2018 BET Awards.

Kwesi Arthur is one of the most successful artists in Ghana, with his music being internationally recognized and awarded. In 2020 his song "Live From The 233" was one of the most streamed African songs on the streaming service Apple Music.

== Controversies And Law suit ==
Glen Boateng, the founder of music company popularly cedis in damages over comments Kwesi Arthur made in a social media post in the month of January 2026.

== Discography ==
=== EPs ===
- Live from Nkrumah Krom (2017)
- This Is Not The Tape, Sorry 4 The Wait (2019)
- Live from Nkrumah Krom Vol II Home Run (2019)
- This Is Not The Tape, Sorry 4 The Wait II (2020)
- This Is Not The Tape III (2024)

=== Studio albums ===
- Son Of Jacob (2022)
- Redemption (2026)

=== Singles ===
Year	Title	Production credit	Ref
2017	Grind Day	Kayso	
2017	Grind Day Remix feat Medikal and Sarkodie (rapper)	Kayso	
2018	Anthem	Barking by Ramz	
2018	Woara (meaning - It Is You)	Shotto Blinkz	
2018	Don't Keep Me Waiting feat Kidi	NytWulf	
2019	Zombie	TwoBars	
2020	Turn On The Lights	Yung D3mz	
2020	Live from 233	Juiczxx	
2020	Baajo feat Joeboy	Yung D3mz	
2021	Winning feat Vic Mensa	Juiczxx	
2022	Nirvana feat Kofi Mole	Juiczxx	
2025	Real Thing		

== Awards and nominations ==
=== Ghana Music Awards ===
Year	Recipient/Nominated work	Award	Result	Ref
2018	Himself	Hip Hop Song of the Year	Won	
2018	Himself	Hiplife/Hip Hop Artiste of the Year	Nominated	
2018	Himself	New Artiste of the Year	Nominated	
2021	Himself	Hiplife/HipHop Artist of the Year	Nominated	
2021	Himself	International Collaboration of the Year	Won	

=== BET Awards ===
Year	Recipient/Nominated work	Award	Result	Ref
2018	Himself	Viewers Choice Best International Act	Nominated	

=== 3 Music Awards ===
Year	Recipient/Nominated work	Award	Result	Ref
2019	Himself	Hip Hop Song of the Year	Nominated	
2019	Himself	Hiplife/Hip Hop Artiste of the Year	Nominated	
2019	Himself	Hiplife/Hip Hop Act of the Year	Nominated	
2019	Himself	Song of The Year	Nominated	
2019	Himself	Music Man of The Year	Nominated	
2019	Himself	Breakthrough Act	Nominated	
2019	Himself	Digital Act of the Year	Nominated	
2019	Himself	Hiplife Song of the year	Nominated	
2019	Himself	Best Collaboration	Won	
