= List of Adisadel College alumni =

This is a list of alumni of Adisadel College found on Wikipedia.

== Academia ==
- William Emmanuel Abraham, Ghanaian philosopher, Professor Emeritus of Philosophy at the University of California, and the first African to be elected a Fellow of All Souls College
- Ebenezer Laing, Ghanaian botanist
- Joshua Owusu-Sekyere, Agricultural Engineer, Rector of Perez University College
- John S. Pobee, Theologian, Emeritus Professor of Theology, and Former Dean of the Faculty of Arts, University of Ghana
- Kwasi Wiredu, philosopher
- Thomas Mensah (engineer), pioneer in fibre optic technology, and lead engineer in first laser guided weapons for US Department of Defense guided missile program

== Arts and entertainment ==
- Kofi Antubam, Ghanaian artist
- Terry Bonchaka, Hip life artist
- Ian Jazzi, Actor and musician
- M3NSA, Musician
- Koo Nimo -born Kwabena Boa-Amponsem, aka Daniel Amponsah, a Ghanaian folklorist and recording artist
- Frank Kobina Parkes, poet
- Shatta Rakon Musician
- Captain James Hackman Tachie-Menson, First black African ship's captain & first African south of the Sahara to man a ship across the Atlantic Ocean; musician and composer of “Where is Our God?”, “Leonora”, “New Born Prince of Peace” and preferred Ghanaian tune to “Hark, Hark, my Soul”.
- George Brigars Williams, former Ghanaian actor.

== Business ==
- Prince Kofi Amoabeng, Businessman and co-founder of defunct UT Bank
- Nana Appiah Mensah (aka NAM1), a businessman and Chief Executive Officer of MenzGold Dealership
- Sam E. Jonah KBE, Executive Chairman of Jonah Capital; previously President of AngloGold Ashanti
- W. Paatii Ofosu-Amaah, Vice President and Corporate Secretary of the World Bank Group, 2003 to 2007. Special Advisor to the President of the African Development Bank, 2008 to 2015.
- Ernest Bediako Sampong, Pharmacist and businessman; CEO of Ernest Chemist Limited; Multiple award winner including multiple CEO of the year awards, Ghana’s Order of the Volta Award, and the CIMG Marketing Man of The Year
- Nii Quaynor, Network Computer Systems

== Clergy ==
- Robert Okine, former Archbishop of West Africa

== Government ==
- Thomas Kwame Aboagye - Politician, Deputy minister in the second republic
- Kwadwo Afari-Gyan, Chairman of the Electoral Commission of Ghana from 1993 to 2015.
- Kennedy Agyapong - Member of Parliament
- Brigadier Akwasi Afrifa, head of state of Ghana and leader of the military government in 1969
- Christopher Ameyaw-Akumfi, former Minister for Education in the Kufuor government
- John Peter Amewu, Minister for Lands and Natural Resources
- Akenten Appiah-Menka - Politician, Deputy minister in the second republic
- James Appietu-Ankrah, Member of parliament for the Lower West Akim constituency (2005–2009)
- George Aryee, Director General of the Ghana Broadcasting Corporation (1991–1992)
- Edward Asafu-Adjaye, diplomat
- Frank Bernasko, former minister of state in the NRC and SMC regime, founder and leader of the erstwhile Action Congress Party.
- Freddie Blay - lawyer, Former Deputy Speaker of the Parliament of Ghana and Chairman of the New Patriotic Party
- Alex Blankson, Member of parliament for the Akrofuom Constituency (2021–)
- Kojo Botsio, minister of state in the first republic
- Kweku Budu-Acquah, diplomat
- Nana Ato Dadzie, Former Ghanaian Chief of Staff, and a United Nations consultant on peacebuilding and political transitions
- B. J. Da Rocha, first chairman of the New Patriotic Party
- Joseph Ampah Kojo Essel, member of parliament for the Dompim constituency (1965 – 1966)
- Robert K. A. Gardiner, diplomat
- Komla Agbeli Gbedemah, Minister of state in the first republic, founder and leader of the National Alliance of Liberals
- Jacob Hackenburg Griffiths-Randolph, a judge and also the Speaker of the Parliament of Ghana during the Third Republic
- Joseph Essilfie Hagan, Minister of state in the first republic of Cape Coast.
- F. A. Jantuah, Minister of state in the first republic and in the PNDC regime
- Kofi Koranteng, Politician and businessman; Independent Presidential Candidate
- Alan John Kyerematen, Ghanaian politician and former diplomat
- Joseph Yaw Manu, Politician, Deputy minister in the second republic
- Andrew Egyapa Mercer, MP
- James Mercer, Former diplomat
- Thomas Mends Kodwo-Mercer, First Black African from the Gold Coast (currently Ghana) to be appointed as a High Commissioner to the UK.
- Edward Nathaniel Moore, former attorney general of Ghana (SMC regime).
- Kwamena Minta Nyarku, Member of parliament for the Cape Coast North constituency (2021–)
- Samuel Kobina Casely Osei-Baidoo, Member of parliament for the Komenda-Edina-Eguafo-Abrem during the second republic
- Edward Osei-Kwaku, deputy Minister for Presidential Affairs, and Minister of Youth and Sports
- Samuel Ernest Quarm, Diplomat
- Kweku George Ricketts-Hagan, Member of Parliament for Cape Coast South, Former Central Regional Minister and Deputy Minister of Finance, and Trade and Industry
- Ebenezer Sekyi-Hughes, Speaker of the Parliament of Ghana
- Kojo Yankah, former minister of state.

== Law ==
- Chief Justice George Kingsley Acquah,
- Chief Justice Philip Edward Archer
- L.J. Chinery-Hesse, parliamentary draftsman, Solicitor-General and Acting Attorney General (1979)
- Godfred Yeboah Dame, current Attorney General of the Republic of Ghana
- Edward Nathaniel Moore, former Attorney General of the Republic of Ghana
- Justice Charles Hayfron-Benjamin, Justice of the Supreme Court of Ghana (1993 – 1999)
- Justice Robert John Hayfron-Benjamin, Chief Justice of Botswana (1977 – 1981)
- A. K. P. Kludze, Justice of the Supreme Court of Ghana (2003 – 2004)
- Koi Larbi, Justice of the Supreme Court of Ghana (1970 – 1972)
- Henry K. Prempeh, Justice of the Supreme Court of Ghana (1971 – 1972)
- Frederick Poku Sarkodee, one of the three High Court judges that were murdered on June 30, 1982.
- Chief Justice Edward Kwame Wiredu

== Monarchs ==
- Azzu Mate Kole II, 4th monarch or king, Konor of the Manya Krobo Traditional Area
- Opoku Ware II, 15th Emperor-King of the Ashanti people and Ashanti

== Public service ==
- Patrick Kwateng Acheampong, former Inspector General of Police of the Ghana Police Service (IGP).
- Louis Casely-Hayford, Engineer, former chief executive officer of the Volta River Authority
- William Frank Kobina Coleman, Engineer, Director General of the Ghana Broadcasting Corporation (1960–1970)
- E. R. T. Madjitey, first Ghanaian commissioner of police and a former politician

== Science and technology ==
- Ave Kludze, a Rocket Scientist, Senior NASA Engineer and first African to fly (command and control) a spacecraft in orbit including the ERBS and TRMM spacecraft for NASA.
- Thomas Mensah - scientist whose single-handed work was most important in making fibreoptic technology commercial.

== Sports ==
=== Footballers ===
- Samuel Appiah, footballer
- Ibrahim Ayew, footballer
- Baffour Gyan, retired footballer
