= Dela Botri =

Ghanaian Flutist,Singer,Songwriter,Music Director and Lecturer

- Born: Yaw Dela Botri; 22 May 1969 (age 57); Lartebiokorshie, Ghana
- Other name: The Flute Magician
- Citizenship: Ghanaian
- Occupation: Musician

- Comment: The musician may be notable, haven't checked fully due to copyright violation, which I have deleted and cleaned up. Lijil (talk) 10:13, 9 June 2025 (UTC)

Yaw Dela Botri (born 22 May 1969) widely known as Dela Botri (The Flute Magician), is a Ghanaian flautist, singer, songwriter, music director, and lecturer. He has been featured on a lot of songs in Ghana such as "Obi Nya Wo Aye" (Someone Wishes to Be You) by Minister OJ.,. "Atia" by Epixode, "Emmre"(Time) by Josh Laryea, and "My Life" by Trigmatic among others. Blakk Rasta also featured him on his latest Salaga Soljah album

== Biography ==
Yaw Dela Botri (Born 22 May 1969) widely known as Dela Botri (The Flute Magician), is a Ghanaian flutist, singer, songwriter, music director, and lecturer.. He has been featured on a lot of songs in Ghana such as "Obi Nya Wo Aye" by Minister OJ, "Atia" by Epixode, "Emmre" by Josh Laryea, "My Life" by Trigmatic among others. Blakk Rasta also featured him on his latest "Salaga Soljah" album. Dela Botri is the founder and leader of Hewale Sounds Band formed 1996. He and his Band have played a lot of shows both in Ghana and Internationally. The Band specializes in Traditional Music and Contemporary extension. They won the Best International Cultural Act at the Ghana Music Awards UK 2022.

== Early life and career ==
Yaw Dela Botri known professionally as Dela Botri (The Flute Magician) was born in Lartebiokorshie a suburb of Accra on 22 May 1969 to Mr. Gladstone Kodzo Botri and Mrs. Patient Yawo Denu Botri. Dela Botri is a Ghanaian flutist, songwriter, music director, and founder and leader of Hewale Sounds Band. He attended Lartebiokorshie 1&2 Middle School Form Four. He started playing the flute at a young age and has since become a household name in the Ghanaian and global music industry. His contributions to the Ghanaian music industry have earned him numerous accolades, including the Ghana Music Awards UK Best International Cultural Act 2022. He is more into folkloric and traditional songs with the fusion of contemporary rhythms. Dela's vision is to conquer the world with his style of music therefore he decided to sing in different languages both international and local, he sings in Twi, Ga Ewe, Spanish, English, and French among others.

== Hewale Sounds Band ==
The Band was formed in 1996 in Accra Ghana, and has worked at the University of Ghana music department under the late Professor J.H. Kwabena Nketia. They won the Best International Cultural Act at the Ghana Music Awards UK 2022. The Band has also performed for the previous Dutch Ambassadors at their residence during Queens Day events to the King's Day.

Hewale Sounds Band

Some of the instruments the band plays include the Atenteben (a bamboo flute), the Akan seprewa, the Harp-lute, the goje one-stringed Dagbani fiddle, the giant Ga gome (frame drum), guitars, xylophones and other types of percussion equipment. After the death of Late Legendary Jewel Ackah, a concert was held in Jewel Ackah's memory on Saturday 21 July 2018 at the +233 Jazz Bar & Grill in Accra. Dela Botri including Gyedu-Blay Ambolley, Kwabena Kwabena, Trigmatic, Safohene Gyeni, eSHUN, Kofi Kinaata, Akua Sika, Rex Omar, Nacee, Joyce Blessing and Akablay performed at the memorial concert.

== Discography ==
Album: Ghana Be Your Own.

Album: Sankofa.

2011 Album: I Surrender.

2020 Album: African Flute Display.

2021: Lorlor EP Love.

List of songs released.

== Recognition ==
Dela Botri and the Hawela Sounds Band have traveled to represent Ghana in many countries including, Japan. He worked with the Royal Dutch Conservatory as a guest professor in 2009 and 2010 in the Den Haag. 2017, Us-based Jazz Guitarist Nathan Pryce collaborated with him to record a music eulogy honoring the memory of the Ghanaian Highlife late Paapa Yankson. 2024, He and his band were the carpet band to perform for the outgone director of the German school in Ghana Goethe Institute. Dela was featured to performed live at the Nobel Peace Price Concert in Norway in honor of the Liberian President. Madam Johnson Miattha Fahnbule was the main artiste. Other artistes included were Anthony Akablay from Ghana, Eric Antonio on keys choir from Norway, and Norwegian Symphonic orchestra. In 2017 Dela Botri was featured on Grammy Award winning album Residente (album) by Puerto Rican rapper Residente. Dela Botri was featured as a percussionist on the "Track 6" Dagombas en Tamale and Flute on "Track 11" "Milo". The album won Grammy Award for Best Latin Rock, Urban or Alternative Album at the 60th Annual Grammy Awards

Yaw Dela Botri received an honorary award at the 2026 Ghana Tertiary Excellence Awards

Dela Botri was featured in The Eyes of Ghana documentary score produced by Barrack Obama and Ishowspeed. And in November, 2026 he performed the score with Kris Bowers in Carlifonia.
