= Emanuela Colombo =

- Citizenship: Italian
- Education: Politecnico di Milano, Italy
- Occupations: Teaching, researcher, writer
- Known for: Energy and scientific research
- Title: Professor

Emanuela Colombo is an Italian energy expert, professor, researcher and scientific advisor. She is a full professor of the Department of Energy and the Rector's Delegate to Science Diplomacy, Cooperation and Development at the Polytechnic University of Milan (Politecnico di Milano) and an adjunct professor at the Nelson Mandela African Institution of Science and Technology. She is also the UNESCO Chair in Energy for Sustainable Development.

== Early life and education ==
Colombo earned a master's degree (MSc) in Nuclear Engineering and a PhD in Energy Engineering, both from the Polytechnic University of Milan in Italy. Before academia, she worked for Ansaldo, ABB and Fluent Inc. (now part of Ansys).

== Career ==
Colombo joined academia in 2001. Her original interests were heat transfer for power generation, turbulence phenomenology, and modeling of computational fluid dynamics. As of 2026, she is the coordinator and lead of the Sustainable Energy System Analysis and Modeling (SESAM) group at the Department of Energy in the Polytechnic University of Milan.

In 2005, Colombo was named Deputy of the Rector’s Delegate to Cooperation and Development at the Politecnico di Milano, a position she held until 2022. In 2011, she was named Rector’s Delegate for international relationships with Africa. In 2023, she became the Rector’s Delegate to Science Diplomacy.

Professor Colombo serves as a scientific coordinator of European projects and international proposals in green innovation (Egypt), sustainable energy engineering (Kenya, Tanzania, and Ethiopia), the nexus of water, food, and energy (Egypt), modern energy services in refugee camps (Lebanon, Somalia, the Central African Republic and Colombia) and capacity building in engineering (Tanzania).

She has been the UNESCO Chair in Energy for Sustainable Development since 2012.

=== African energy activism ===
In an interview with The Guardian Nigeria in 2021, Colombo stated, "If Africa will not be provided with the affordable and reliable energy that its people deserve, no sustainable development may ever come to the continent. Moreover, in Africa, with special reference to some areas (like residential and industrial sectors) there is still much work that can be done toward efficiency in order to reduce the primary energy consumption and as a consequence current GHG (greenhouse gas) emissions intensity in the continent."

In 2023, at a colloquium attended by representatives of the African Union and European Union, Colombo said that energy remains a crucial to development, especially in Africa.

In 2021 Emanuela Colombo hosted a virtual program organised by UNESCO titled "Energy – Development Nexus: Towards a People-Centred Approach." Colombo stated during the program that there is, "need for Africans to design or get involved in designing a tailored solution to the energy challenges on the continent."

Colombo is a member of the Advisory Board of Green Growth Africa. It is a non-profit, non-governmental organization that focuses on innovation, development, and implementation of ‘greened’ socio-economic development solutions that address Africa's development challenges on climate change, environmental sustainability and environmental education. It was founded by Dr. Adedoyin Adeleke, a co-chair of the United Nations Independent Group of Scientists.

== Publications ==
Colombo has published over 200 scientific papers, out of which 120 are in Scopus with an h-index of 42 in 2026. She is the primary author of the book "Renewable Energy for Unleashing Sustainable Development", published by Springer in 2013.

Some of her other publications include:

- Rinaldi, Lorenzo; Rocco, Matteo; Colombo, Emanuela (2023-06-29). An integrated energy-economic model for the energy transition: insights on critical raw materials exploitation. 29th International Input-Output Association Conference – via ResearchGate.
- Mandelli, Stefano; Merlo, Marco; Colombo, Emanuela (2016-04-01). "Novel procedure to formulate load profiles for off-grid rural areas". Energy for Sustainable Development. 31: 130–142. Bibcode:2016ESusD..31..130M. doi:10.1016/j.esd.2016.01.005. hdl:11311/999214. ISSN 0973-0826.
- Colombo, Emanuela; Crevani, Giacomo; Stevanato, Nicolò; Mereu, Riccardo (2024-05-01). "Comprehensive energy solution planning (CESP) framework: an evidence-based approach for sustainable energy access projects in developing countries". Environmental Research Letters. 19 (5): 054059. Bibcode:2024ERL....19e4059C. doi:10.1088/1748-9326/ad41ef. ISSN 1748-9326 – via iopscience.
- Golinucci, Nicolò; Tonini, Francesco; Rocco, Matteo Vincenzo; Colombo, Emanuela (2023-12-01). "Towards BitCO2, an individual consumption-based carbon emission reduction mechanism". Energy Policy. 183 113851. doi:10.1016/j.enpol.2023.113851. hdl:11311/1258388. ISSN 0301-4215.
- Tahavori, Mohammad Amin; Golinucci, Nicolò; Rinaldi, Lorenzo; Rocco, Matteo Vincenzo; Colombo, Emanuela (2023-10-27). "MARIO: A Versatile and User-Friendly Software for Building Input-Output Models". Journal of Open Research Software. 11 (1) 14. doi:10.5334/jors.473. ISSN 2049-9647.
- Mandelli, Stefano; Merlo, Marco; Colombo, Emanuela (2016-04-01). "Novel procedure to formulate load profiles for off-grid rural areas". Energy for Sustainable Development. 31: 130–142. Bibcode:2016ESusD..31..130M. doi:10.1016/j.esd.2016.01.005. hdl:11311/999214. ISSN 0973-0826.
- Riva, Fabio; Ahlborg, Helene; Hartvigsson, Elias; Pachauri, Shonali; Colombo, Emanuela (2018-04-01). "Electricity access and rural development: Review of complex socio-economic dynamics and causal diagrams for more appropriate energy modelling". Energy for Sustainable Development. 43: 203–223. Bibcode:2018ESusD..43..203R. doi:10.1016/j.esd.2018.02.003. hdl:11311/1053239. ISSN 0973-0826.
- Colombo, Emanuela; Nebuloni, Manuela (2022), "Presentation", in Montedoro, Laura; Buoli, Alice; Frigerio, Alessandro (eds.), Territorial Development and Water-Energy-Food Nexus in the Global South, Cham: Springer International Publishing, pp. 1–3, doi:10.1007/978-3-030-96538-9_1, ISBN 978-3-030-96537-2
- Lombardi, Francesco; Pickering, Bryn; Colombo, Emanuela; Pfenninger, Stefan (2020-10-14). "Policy Decision Support for Renewables Deployment through Spatially Explicit Practically Optimal Alternatives". Joule. 4 (10): 2185–2207. Bibcode:2020Joule...4.2185L. doi:10.1016/j.joule.2020.08.002. ISSN 2542-4351.
- Colombo, Emanuela (27 May 2021). "Africa's energy tales in a post-COVID-19 world". ESI Africa.
