= Omololu Akin-Ojo =

- Education: University of Ibadan, Nigeria (BSc. and MSc.), University of Delaware (Ph.D.)
- Awards: American Physical Society Fellow
- Scientific career
- Fields: Theoretical Physics, Condensed Matter Physics

Omololu Akin-Ojo is a Nigerian theoretical, condensed matter physicist who was the founding director of the International Centre for Theoretical Physics-East African Institute for Fundamental Research (ICTP-EAIFR) based in Kigali, Rwanda.

== Education and career ==
Akin-Ojo obtained his Bachelors of Science in Physics (1995) and Masters in Physics (1998) from the University of Ibadan, Nigeria. He then went on to study physics at the University of Delaware for a PhD in physics in 2006, where he conducted research in condensed matter physics. After obtaining his Ph.D., Akin-Ojo completed his postdoctoral work at the ICTP based in Trieste, Italy.

Akin-Ojo returned to Nigeria after his postdoctoral research to work at the African University of Science and Technology Abuja, Nigeria where he taught theoretical physics.

In 2018, Akin-Ojo became the founding director of the ICTP-EAIFR at the University of Rwanda's College of Science and Technology in Kigali. His goal for the institute was to use physics and STEM education for the development of Africa.

== Research ==
Currently, Akin-Ojo is focused on the simplification of models to predict the properties of materials or catalysts. Specifically, he is working on theoretical work related to quantum dots which could be useful for solar cells and energy production in Africa .

== Recognition ==
In 2025, Omololu Akin-Ojo was named an American Physical Society Fellow "for enhancing the science ecosystem in Africa and global physics communities as the inaugural director of the East African Institute for Fundamental Research, a UNESCO center in Rwanda."
