= W. Paatii Ofosu-Amaah =

Ghanaian lawyer, international civil servant and diplomat

Special Advisor to the President of the African Development Bank
- In office September 2008 – September 2015

Vice President and Corporate Secretary, World Bank Group
- In office 2003–2007

Personal details
- Born: William Jacob Paatii Ofosu-Amaah; 13 July 1950 Accra, Gold Coast
- Died: 13 April 2016 (aged 65) Chevy Chase, Maryland
- Spouse: Waafas Ofosu-Amaah (m. 1976)
- Children: 2; Nii Amaah Koranteng Ofosu-Amaah; Naabia Ofosu-Amaah
- Education: Adisadel College; University of Ghana (LLB); Harvard Law School (LLM)
- Occupation: Lawyer; International Civil Servant; Diplomat

W. Paatii Ofosu-Amaah born William Jacob Paatii Ofosu-Amaah (13 July 1950 – 13 April 2016) was a Ghanaian lawyer, international civil servant and diplomat who served as the Vice President and Corporate Secretary of the World Bank Group from 2003 to 2007. He was the Special Advisor to the President of the African Development Bank from 2008 to 2015.

== Early life and education ==
Ofosu-Amaah was born in Accra, Ghana in 1950 to Ga-Dangme parents, Lawrence and Bernice Ofosu-Amaah. He was the youngest child in a large family.

With accelerated promotion, he finished his first four years of his primary education in 2 years. He attended the all-boys Anglican boarding school, Adisadel College in Cape Coast for his secondary education. At age 20, he received his undergraduate LLB degree from the University of Ghana, Legon. He proceeded to Harvard Law School, where he received an LLM in 1972.

== Career ==
Ofosu-Amaah began his legal career as an Associate at Davis Polk & Wardwell in New York, from 1973 to 1975. He then moved to Rome where he worked as a Legal Officer at the Food and Agriculture Organization (FAO) of the United Nations (UN), from 1975 to 1978. In Rome, he developed a love for Italian suits which became his signature sartorial choice.

In 1978, he joined the World Bank at its headquarters in Washington, D.C., staying on for three decades and worked in areas relating to the legal dimensions of international development. He had oversight over legal frameworks and judicial reforms for more than 500 complex World Bank-financed project of the World Bank in regions such as Africa, Asia, Latin America and the Caribbean, Europe and the Middle East. He had been Senior Counsel for bank-financed operations in China, Indonesia, Jordan, Romania and Nepal. He wrote legal instruments and the constitution of the African Capacity Building Foundation. As the legal advisor for environmental affairs, he was the World Bank delegate in the negotiations of global environmental treaties between 1986 and 1991 and played a role in the establishment of the Global Environment Facility and the development of various environmental and social-related policies of the international organisation. Ofosu-Amaah's positions at the World Bank legal vice presidency include Acting General Counsel, Deputy General Counsel, Chief Counsel, Africa Division, Legal Adviser, Environmental Affairs among others.

In 2003, he became the Vice President and Corporate Secretary of the World Bank and worked closely with three of the institution's presidents, including James Wolfensohn (1995-2005). As the Acting General Counsel, he was the principal legal officer of the Bank, providing legal and policy advice to the Management and the Board of the Bank. As Corporate Secretary, he was part of the committee that selected two World Bank Presidents, Paul Wolfowitz (2005-2007) and Robert Zoellick (2007-2012).

Between September 2008 and September 2015, was appointed the Special Advisor to the President of the African Development Bank, Donald Kaberuka. Ofosu-Amaah was a member of the African Union High Level Implementation Panel that included Thabo Mbeki of South Africa and Abdulsalami Abubakar of Nigeria, facilitating negotiations between the Republics of Sudan and South Sudan.

He was the author of many World Bank publications relating to institutional policies and operations, combating corruption, project and infrastructure finance, environment management and negotiation issues, post-conflict reconstruction, and governance and capacity building, legal and judicial reform in Africa.

He sat on the Board of Trustees of the African University of Science and Technology, the Nelson Mandela Institution, and the International Law Institute - African Centre for Legal Excellence in Uganda. He lectured at the International Development Law Institute in Rome, the International Law Institute in Washington, D.C., and was a Visiting Professorial Fellow at Queen Mary University of London.

== Selected publications ==
- W. Paatii Ofosu-Amaah, "Women: Key Partners in Sustainable and Equitable Development : Resource Materials on Women and Sustainable Development," 1994
- Raj Soopramien, W. Paatii Ofosu-Amaah, Kishor Uprety “Combating Corruption: A Comparative Review of Selected Legal Aspects of State Practice and International Initiatives” World Bank, Washington DC, 1 July 1999
- W. Paatii Ofosu-Amaah “Reforming Business-Related Laws to Promote Private Sector Development: The World Bank Experience in Africa” World Bank, Washington DC, 16 May 2000

== Personal life ==
He married Waafas Ofosu-Amaah in 1976, in London. He met his future wife as an 18-year old in Accra in 1968 and maintained a long-distance relationship with her while they both studied abroad. Together, they raised their two children, a son, Nii Amaah Koranteng and a daughter, Naabia. Waafas Ofosu-Amaah served as the regional coordinator for African policy, at the World Bank's development office in Washington, D.C. Ofosu Amaah's siblings were Samuel, the founding Director of the School of Public Health, University of Ghana; George, former Dean of the Faculty of Law, University of Ghana; May, Director at the Social Welfare Department during the PNDC years and Vincent, former Director of the Ghana Commercial Bank. W. Paatii Ofosu-Amaah was a Bob Marley aficionado and loved Ghanaian highlife music. He was a lifelong Anglican.

== Death and funeral ==
W. Patii Ofosu-Amaah died suddenly in Chevy Chase, Maryland, on 13 April 2016, aged 65. His funeral service at the Grace Episcopal Church, Silver Spring, Maryland on 26 April 2016. His remains were interred in Accra on Thursday 12 May 2016. Upon his death, the Sudan People's Liberation Movement (SPLM) sent a note of condolence.
