= Adedoyin Adeleke =

Nigerian climate activist

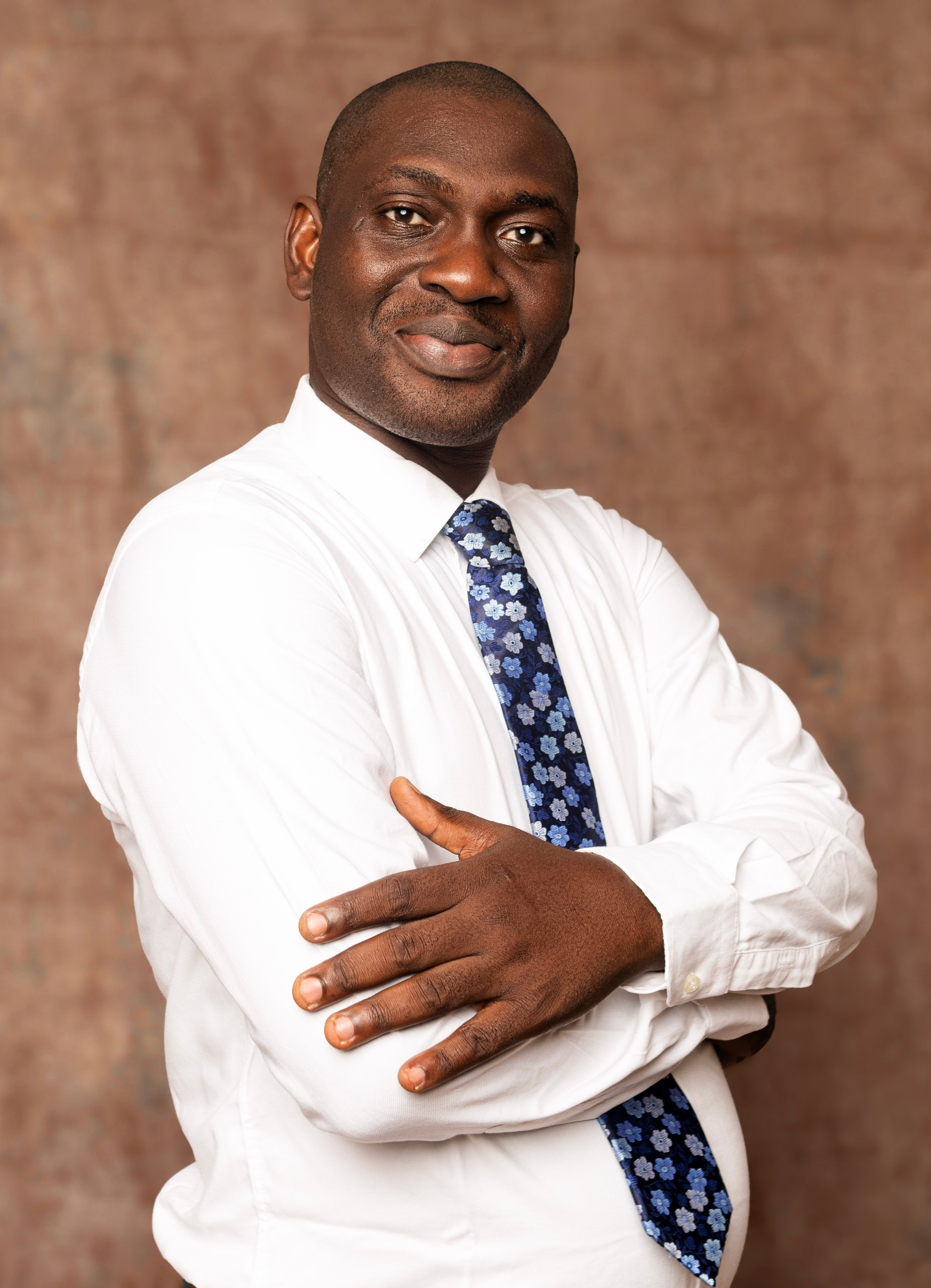
- Born: 1989/07/07; Osogbo
- Citizenship: Nigerian
- Education: Obafemi Awolowo University, University of Ibadan, Politecnico di Milano
- Occupation: Climate change activist
- Organization: Green Growth Africa
- Known for: Environmental activism
- Awards: Fellow for the 69th UNEP/UNESCO/BMUB International Short Course on Renewable Energy and Energy Efficiency in 2016

Adedoyin Adeleke (born July 7, 1989) is a Nigerian climate change activist and the first African to be appointed a co-chair of the Independent Group of Scientists by the UN Secretary-General, António Guterres on 19 September 2025. He started a climate change program in schools in Africa where students are taught to be positive agents and champions in mitigating climate change in their communities. He is the Director of Green Growth Africa Sustainability Network.

== Early life and education ==
Adedoyin was born in Osogbo in Osun State, Nigeria. He had his primary and secondary schools in Osogbo, the capital of Osun state. His first degree was at Obafemi Awolowo University, followed by a master's degree at the University of Ibadan. He then moved to Italy on scholarship for his doctoral degree under the Italian government. He has his PhD on Energy and Nuclear Science and Technology at Politecnico di Milano. He lived and worked in Italy before relocating to Nigeria.

== Career as a climate change activist ==
Adeleke was made a co-chair of the United Nations Independent Group of Scientists. He has the responsibility of preparing for the 2027 Global Sustainable Development Report. According to the statement, "The appointment, made by United Nations Secretary-General António Guterres, marks a historic milestone as Dr. Adeleke becomes the first African to be appointed Co-Chair of the eminent group of 15 scientists selected from across the world. He is also the first Nigerian to be appointed to a prestigious group."

In December 2024, Adedoyin attended a related event on climate change – a ceremony for the fight against environmental crimes and violations in Abuja, Nigeria. During the program he stated that, "Environmental crimes have emerged as the world's fourth largest form of organised crime, trailing only drug trafficking, counterfeiting, and human trafficking, according to the United Nations Environment Programme. Africa is blessed with rich biodiversity and natural resources, a quarter of the world’s mammal species, one-fifth of the world’s bird species, and one-sixth of the world’s remaining forests call Africa home".

In 2022 when the Green Growth Africa won the Okayama award for Education for Sustainable Development, Adedoyin stated "So far, our Environmental Education Programme has impacted more than 3,000 students, 44 teachers and 156 families in Nigeria, South Africa, Ghana, Cameroon, Kenya and Uganda, including outreaches to schools in United States of America and Italy." The award is given to two organization only throughout the world in an annual event for the promotion of sustainability development.

== Awards and recognition ==
In 2018, he was in the list of 40 under 40 of changemakers in the global solar energy industry (Renewable Energy World, USA). He was the first African to be in the list of 30 under 30 of Changemakers in Environmental Education by the North America Association for Environmental Education (USA). He was selected as one of the Top 100 Shakers and Movers in e-learning in Africa. This was rated by Bob Little Press and Public Relations, United Kingdom. He was selected as a Fellow for the 69th UNEP/UNESCO/BMUB International Short Course on Renewable Energy and Energy Efficiency in 2016 at Technische Universitat Dresden, Germany. This was funded by the German government.

He was the UNESCO Chair, Energy for Sustainable Development, Politecnico di Milano, Italy.

== Selected publications ==
1. Decentralized Renewable Hybrid Mini-Grids for Rural Communities: Culmination of the IREP Framework and Scale up to Urban Communities. A co-authored paper with Ugwoke Blessing, Corgnati Stefano P., Pearce Joshua M. and Leone Pierluigi

2. Energy-Development Nexus: Towards a People-Centered Approach. A co-authored paper with Emanuela Colombo, Diana Shendrikova and Manuela Nebuloni.

3. Renewable Energy Development in Africa: Lessons and Policy Recommendations from South Africa, Egypt, and Nigeria. A co-authored paper with Fabio Inzoli and Emanuela Colombo.
