= Viridiana (name) =

Viridiana (Spanish, Portuguese, Latin), Viridianne (French, English), Verdiana (Italian) is a female given name of Latin origin as well as the name of an Italian saint.

== Origin and meaning ==
The origin of the female first name Viridiana comes from the Latin word "viridis", meaning "green".

== Popularity ==
Viridiana has never ranked in the top 1,000 female names outside the United States. It first entered the U.S. baby name popularity charts in 1991 in the 981st spot. By 1997 Viridiana was no longer on the baby name popularity charts, having placed at 934th place the previous year. The highest rank for the name Viridiana in the top 1,000 baby names was in 1995, reaching 784th most popular female name in the U.S..

== Variations ==
- Viria
- Viridia
- Viridiana
- Viridianna
- Viridianne

== People and projects ==
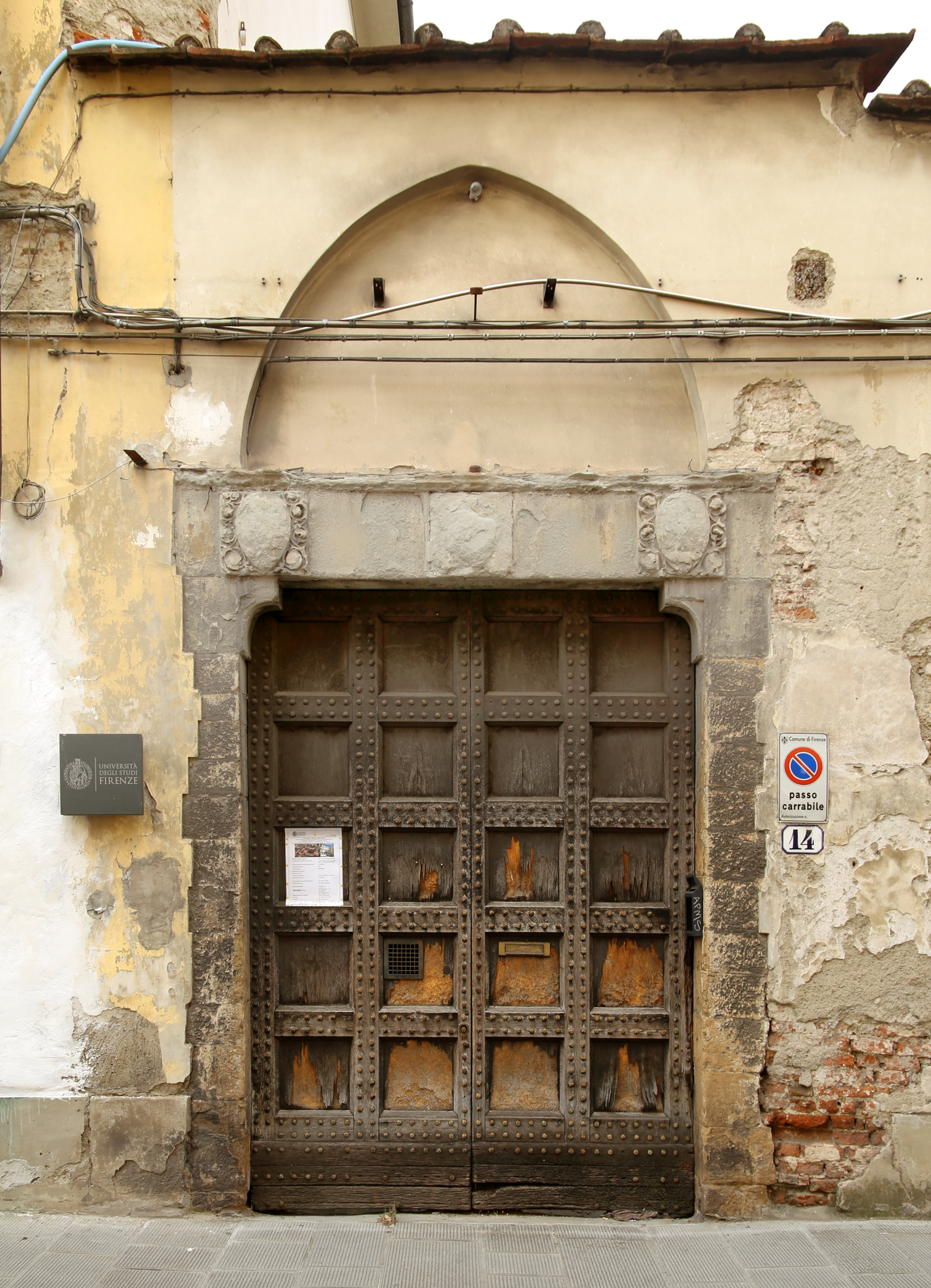
Santa Verdiana Church in Florence, located in Italy

=== Saints ===
- Verdiana: an Italian/French Saint

=== Films ===
- Viridiana: a film by Spanish director Luis Buñuel

=== Fiction ===
- Viridiana Sovari: a character from the Night Angel trilogy

=== People ===
- Verdiana Masanja (born 1954), Tanzanian mathematician
