= Stonebwoy =

Ghana afropop star

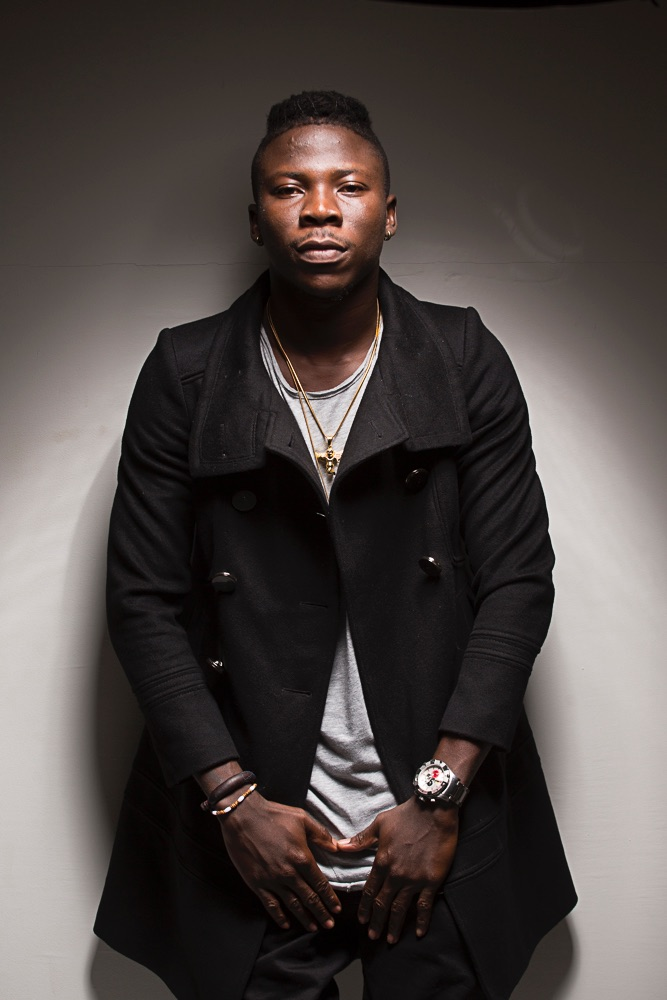

Background information
- Also known as: 1GAD, The TORCHER
- Born: Livingstone Etse Satekla; 5 March 1988 (age 38); Ashaiman, Ghana
- Origin: Alakple • modaso, Ghana
- Genres: Afropop; Afrobeats; Dancehall; Reggae
- Occupation: Musician
- Instrument: Vocals
- Years active: 2009–present
- Labels: Burniton Music Group; Def Jam Africa; Ada music
- Website: Official website

Livingstone Etse Satekla (born 5 March 1988), better known by his stage name Stonebwoy, is a Ghanaian reggae and dancehall musician from Ashaiman, Accra. He is regarded as the leading figure in reggae-danchall from Africa.

He is the CEO of Burniton Music Group. He won the Best International Act: Africa category at the 2015 BET Awards and Artiste of the Year at the 2015 and 2024 Ghana Music Awards. He is also a recipient of two Billboard plaques. Stonebwoy received the Golden Club plaque from Boomplay after surpassing 100 million streams on the platform. He has been described as the king of reggae and dance hall in Africa. Stonebwoy is also an actor, having appeared in the movies Happy Death Day and My name is Ramadan. He is a global ambassador for sanitation. In September 2019, he was made the brand ambassador for Voltic Natural Mineral Water. He is the brand ambassador of Tecno mobile in Ghana.

In 2022, he signed to Universal Music Group's Def Jam Recordings, and its flagship Def Jam Recordings Africa, to release his fifth studio album 5Th Dimension (2023), which debuted number eight(8) on Billboard Reggae Albums Charts. He is commissioned to make three albums under the label.

== Life and music career ==
Etse was born in Ashaiman in the Greater Accra region of Ghana and began making music in his early school days. He realized his talents and abilities as a lyricist and scriptwriter at an early age, remembering writing and acting drama pieces as far back as his fourth year in primary school.

He obtained his high school certificate at Tema Methodist Day Secondary School and later enrolled at the University of Professional Studies to pursue a degree in Marketing, in 2013. However, he cut short his studies to focus on his music.

In June 2024, Stonebwoy graduated with a degree in public administration from the Ghana Institute of Management and Public Administration (GIMPA). In September 2024, Stonebwoy returned to GIMPA for a Master of Arts programme in International Public Relations and Diplomacy.

His fifth studio album 5th Dimension, was released on 28 April 2023. It debuted No. 8 on Billboard Reggae Albums Charts.

His most recent release was on 24 September 2024, and is a single titled "Jejereje." The song's title translates from local parlance to “one's cup of tea,” implying that a person's actions shape their fate. In July 2025, Stonebwoy performed at the Reeds Festival in Switzerland, delivering a high-energy set and sharing a message of gratitude with fans.

== Recognition and musical style ==
Stonebwoy normally sings in Jamaican Patois (Patwa or Patwah). In 2015, he received awards and nominations ranging from "Artist of the Year" to "Album of the Year". His sophomore album, Necessary Evil, was the recipient of three Ghana Music Awards from 6 nominations. Nana Appiah Mensah, CEO of gold dealership company Menzgold, sent out words of encouragement to Stonebwoy on Instagram for Stonebwoy being supportive. On 18 April 2019, Nana Appiah Mensah posted a photo of Dance hall act Stonebwoy saying he is proud of the Bhim Nation president for defending him and that God bless him.

He was listed as part of the 2019 50 (fifty) young CEOs, by YCEO and Avance media. The list, which was launched in 2018, honours distinguished young people providing solutions to some of Ghana's problems.

In 2020, the Grammy Awards handed a plaque to Stonebwoy in acknowledgment of his role as featured performer on Grammy award-nominated single "AVRAKEDABRA" by Morgan Heritage.

In 2021, three albums on which Stonebwoy featured were nominated for the 2022 Grammy Awards.

In 2022, Vodafone Ghana recognized him for using his creativity and music to promote the awareness of environmental and sustainability issues. His song "Greedy Men" received an award and a cash reward of GH¢ 10,000.

In acknowledgment of his achievement in securing the 8th position on its chart, Billboard honored him with a certified plaque.

== Philanthropy ==
Stonebwoy established the Livingstone Foundation. In January 2017 the foundation announced a sponsorship package for five students of the Tema Methodist Day Senior High School, his alma mater. As part of celebrations for Stonebwoy's 30th birthday, the foundation donated a sum of GH¢5,000 to the accident ward of the Korle-Bu Teaching Hospital in March 2018. Stonebwoy has also opened the official BHIM merch shop in Ashaiman. Proceeds from the shop are used to fund activities of the Livingstone Foundation.

In 2020, the Livingstone Foundation in collaboration with the BHIM Merchandise Shop gave out free sanitizers as parts of efforts to combat the coronavirus spread in Ghana. Stonebwoy also donated sanitizers and other items to the Police Department in Ashaiman to aid them in discharging their duties during the coronavirus pandemic in Ghana.

In 2022, the Livingstone Foundation together with Duffour Foundation renovated a basic school that serves four towns close to Stonebwoy's hometown.

Stonebwoy out of his goodwill and on behalf of his Livingstone Foundation has decided to play a free show at an upcoming show hosted by HoodTalk Music Festival on May 9 at the Accra Independence Square to aim to raise $14 million towards the construction of five pediatric clinics.

In an attempt to help the underprivileged in society, Stonebwoy chose to play for free at the HoodTalk Music Festival though it is not compulsory for artists to take up corporate social responsibilities (CSR). Through his charity organization, Livingstone Foundation, Stonebwoy has supported several institutions and Communities, with its main focus on equal access to education, accident survivor healthcare, community advocacy and youth empowerment.

== Endorsements ==
Stonebwoy is the brand ambassador for Big Boss, an energy drink. In September 2020, Stonebwoy was named Tecno Mobile brand ambassador and unveiled the Camon 16 Series in October 2020. Stonebwoy and his family are the brand ambassador for Ghandour Cosmetics. They represent the GC brand, a division of Ghandour Cosmetics. This partnership was announced in August 2023.

== World tours and notable performances ==
Stonebwoy kicked off his world tour in the Euro-zone in August 2014. He performed in Germany, Italy, Spain and Austria. In his 2016 Canada-America tour, he performed in New York City, Ohio, Philadelphia and Ontario. In the same year, he played in Perth, Melbourne, Brisbane and Sydney.

In his second Euro tour, he played in Denmark, Finland and Sweden in the last quarter of 2017. Stonebwoy performed at Reggae Sumfest, Afro nation festival in Portugal, Rotterdam reggae festival, Uppsala Reggae Festival. Rototom Sunsplash.

Stonebwoy headlined the 2022 Global Citizen Festival at the Black Star Square, Accra alongside SZA, Usher, Sarkodie, Gyakie, H.E.R, Stormzy and Tems. His performance was adjudged one of the best by industry professionals, critics and patrons.

In 2025, Stonebwoy embarked on his Up & Runnin6 World Tour, beginning with a North American leg in February. He performed in Chicago, Columbus, Toronto, New York, Worcester, and Silver Spring before headlining at London’s O2 Shepherd’s Bush Empire on 8 March, where he was joined by fellow Ghanaian artists Fameye and AratheJay. The European leg also included a performance in Hamburg, Germany, at the Uebel & Gefährlich venue on 15 March.

Ahead of the tour, Stonebwoy appeared at Paris Fashion Week Menswear Fall/Winter 2025, where he made headlines for his fashion-forward showcase. On 9 May 2025, he headlined the HoodTalk Music Festival: Unity Edition at Independence Square in Accra, an event that aimed to raise US$14 million to build five pediatric clinics across Ghana. The concert drew over 15,000 attendees and was broadcast to more than 195 countries.

Stonebwoy was also scheduled to perform at the Dream Wknd Festival in Negril, Jamaica, on 5 August 2025. In addition, he delivered a special performance with guitarist Six Strings at the Africa Prosperity Dialogues 2025 in Accra.

== Discography ==
Studio albums

- Grade #1 (2012)
- Necessary Evil (2014)
- Epistles of Mama (2017)
- Anloga Junction (2020)
- 5th Dimension (2023)
- Up & Running (2024)

EPs

- Livingstone (2015)
- The Torcher (2025)
- Torcher II (2026)

=== Singles ===
Year	Title	Album	Ref.
2012	Rat Race	Grade #1	
2012	Head Up/Above the Sky	Grade #1	
2012	Kiss n Cry	Grade #1	
2012	Please Don't Go	Grade #1	
2012	Onumade	Grade #1	
2012	Agoro	Grade #1	
2013	Party Again	Necessary Evil	
2013	Pull Up	Necessary Evil	
2013	No Sir	Necessary Evil	
2014	Wicked	Necessary Evil	
2014	Physically	Necessary Evil	
2014	Bhim Nation	Necessary Evil	
2014	Baafira	Necessary Evil	
2014	Ex Boyfriend	Necessary Evil	
2014	Can't Cool	Necessary Evil	
2014	So Real	Necessary Evil	
2014	Gwaan	Necessary Evil	
2014	Real Warrior	Necessary Evil	
2014	Murderer	Necessary Evil	
2014	More Gyal	Necessary Evil	
2015	Go Higher	Non-album single	
2015	Mightylele	Non-album single	
2016	People Dey	Non-album single	
2016	We made it	Non-album single	
2016	Problem	Non-album single	
2016	Last Station	Non-album single	
2016	Guy Guy	Non-album single	
2016	Sapashini	Non-album single	
2016	Any Day	Non-album single	
2016	Sick Inna Head	Non-album single	
2016	By Grace	Non-album single	
2017	My Name	Non-album single	
2017	Come From Far(Wo Gb3 J3k3)	Non-album single	
2017	Falling Again	Non-album single	
2017	Hero	Non-album single	
2017	Enkulenu	Non-album single	
2018	Dirty Enemies	Non-album single	
2018	Kpo K3K3	Non-album single	
2018	Loyalty	Non-album single	
2018	Tomorrow	Non-album single	
2018	Smile Time Done(S.T.D/Worldwide)	Non-album single	
2018	Most Original	Epistles of Mama	
2018	Wame	Non-album single	
2018	Top Skanka	Non-album single	
2019	Shuga	Non-album single	
2019	Tuff Seed	Non-album single	
2019	Ololo	Non-album	
2019	Big Boss	Non-album	
2019	Black People	Non-album	
2019	More	Non-album	
2019	Take me away	Non-album	
2019	Take me there	Non-album	
2019	What a place	Non-album	
2020	Sobolo	Non-album	
2020	Good morning	Anloga Junction	
2020	African Party	Anloga Junction	
2020	Understand	Anloga Junction	
2020	Le Gba Gbe	Anloga Junction	
2020	Nominate	Anloga Junction	
2020	Everlasting	Anloga Junction	
2020	Journey	Anloga Junction	
2020	Nkuto	Anloga Junction	
2020	Only Love	Anloga Junction	
2020	Motion	Anloga Junction	
2020	Bow Down	Anloga Junction	
2020	Critical	Anloga Junction	
2020	Black Madonna	Anloga Junction	
2020	African idol	Anloga Junction	
2020	Strength and Hope	Anloga Junction	
2020	Putuu	Non-album	
2020	Blaze Dem	Non-album	
2020	Activate	Non-album	
2021	1Gad	Non-album	
2021	We move	Non-album	
2021	Blessing		
2021	Outside	Non-album	
2021	Ariba	Non-album	
2021	Greedy Men	Non-album	
2021	Nukedzor	Non-album	
2022	Therapy	5TH DIMENSION	
	Gidigba	Non-album	
2023	Life & Money (featuring Stormzy)		
2024	Stonebwoy - OVERLORD		-
2024	Jejereje	Non-album single	
2025	Torcher	The Torcher EP	
2025	Send Dem A Prayer	The Torcher EP	
2025	Gidigidi	The Torcher EP	
2025	Samankudi	The Torcher EP	
2025	Outside Lifestyle	The Torcher EP	
2025	Susuka	The Torcher EP	
2025	Xosetor	The Torcher EP	
2025	Deeper	The Torcher EP	

Featured in

- 2021: "Guns of Navarone" (Sean Paul feat. Jesse Royal, Stonebwoy & Mutabaruka)

== Awards and nominations ==
Awards won by Stonebwoy and his nominations
Year	Award ceremony	Award Presented	Nominated work/recipient	Result	Ref
2015	BET Awards	Best International Act	Himself	Won	
2015	Vodafone Ghana Music Awards	Artist of the Year	Himself	Won	
2015	Vodafone Ghana Music Awards	Reggae/Dancehall Artiste of the Year	Himself	Won	
2015	All Africa Music Awards	Best African Reggae, Ragga and Dancehall	Himself	Won	
2015	MTN 4Syte Music Awards	Best Reggae/Dancehall Video	Himself	Won	
2015	MTN 4Syte Music Awards	Best Directed Video	Himself	Won	
2015	MTN 4Syte Music Awards	Most Influential Artist	Himself	Won	
2016	International Reggae and World Music Awards	Most Promising Act	Himself	Won	
2016	Vodafone Ghana Music Awards	Reggae/Dancehall Song of the Year	Himself	Won	
2016	Ghana Music Awards UK	Most Popular Song of the Year	Himself	Nominated	
2016	Ghana Music Awards UK	Reggae/Dancehall Song of the Year	Himself	Won	
2016	Ghana Music Awards UK	Artiste of the Year	Himself	Nominated	
2016	Ghana Music Awards UK	Album of the Year	Himself	Won	
2017	BET Awards	Best International Act	Himself	Nominated	
2017	Vodafone Ghana Music Awards	Reggae/Dancehall Artiste of the Year	Himself	Won	
2017	Vodafone Ghana Music Awards	Reggae/Dancehall song of the Year	Himself	Won	
2018	All Africa Music Awards	Best Reggae/Dancehall African Artiste	Himself	Won	
2018	Nickelodeon Kids' Choice Awards	Favorite African Star	Himself	Won	
2018	3Music Awards	Reggae/Dancehall artiste of the Year	Himself	Won	
2018	3Music Awards	Twitstar of the Year	Himself	Won	
2018	3Music Awards	Instagram Star of the Year	Himself	Won	
2018	Vodafone Ghana Music Awards	Reggae/Dancehall Artiste of the Year	Himself	Won	
2019	African Entertainment Awards USA	Best Male Artiste	Himself	Won	
2019	AFRIMA	Best Reggae Dancehall Artiste	Himself	Won	
2020	International Reggae and World Music Awards	Best African Reggae/Dancehall Entertainer	Himself	Won	
2022	3Music Awards	Reggae/Dancehall Act of the Year	Himself	Won	
2022	Vodafone Ghana Music Awards	Vodafone Green Award	Himself	Won	
2022	Vodafone Ghana Music Awards	Reggae/Dancehall Artiste of the Year	Himself	Won	
2022	Vodafone Ghana Music Awards	Music for Good	Greedy Men	Won	
2022	Vodafone Ghana Music Awards	Best Collaboration	Enjoyment Minister (featured)	Won	
2023	Vodafone Ghana Music Awards	Best Afro Pop of the Year		Won	
2024	Telecel Ghana Music Awards	Reggea Dancehall Artiste of The Year		Won	
2024	Telecel Ghana Music Awards	Album of The Video		Won	
2024	Telecel Ghana Music Awards	Record of the Year		Won	
2024	Telecel Ghana Music Awards	Best International Collaboration of the Year	Manodzi	Won	
2024	Telecel Ghana Music Awards	Best Songwriter of the Year	Manodzi	Won	
2024	Telecel Ghana Music Awards	Artiste of the Year	Himself	Won	
2024	YEN Entertainment Awards	Best Male Artist of the Year	Himself	Pending	
2024	YEN Entertainment Awards	Most Stylish Male Celeb	Himself	Pending	
2024	3Music Awards	Album of the Year	5th Dimension	Pending	
2024	3Music Awards	Artiste (MVP) of the Year		Pending	
2024	3Music Awards	Best Collaboration of the Year	"Likor"	Pending	
2024	3Music Awards	Digital Act of the Year		Pending	
2024	3Music Awards	Highlife Song of the Year	"Manodzi"	Pending	
2024	3Music Awards	Video of the Year	"Manodzi"	Pending	
2024	3Music Awards	Performer of the Year	BHIM 5th Dimension Concert 2023	Pending	
2024	3Music Awards	Reggae/Dancehall Song of the Year	"Non-Stop"	Pending	
2024	3Music Awards	Reggae/Dancehall Act of the Year		Pending	
2024	3Music Awards	Song of the Year	"Into the Future"	Pending	
2024	Ghana Music Awards USA	Artist of the Year	Himself	Nominated	
2024	Ghana Music Awards USA	Reggae/Dancehall Artist of the Year	Himself	Won	
2024	Ghana Music Awards USA	Most Popular Song of the Year	"Into the Future"	Nominated	
2024	Ghana Music Awards USA	Best Collaboration of the Year	"Likor"	Nominated	
2024	Ghana Music Awards USA	Best Collaboration of the Year	"Manodzi"	Nominated	
2024	Ghana Music Awards UK	Artist of the Year	Himself	Pending	
2024	Ghana Music Awards UK	Reggae/Dancehall Artist of the Year	Himself	Pending	
2024	Ghana Music Awards UK	Most Popular Song of the Year	"Into the Future"	Pending	
2024	Ghana Music Awards UK	Most Popular Song of the Year	"Likor"	Pending	
2024	Ghana Music Awards UK	Best Collaboration of the Year	"Likor"	Pending	
2024	Ghana Music Awards UK	Best Collaboration of the Year	"Manodzi"	Pending	
2024	Ghana Music Awards UK	Songwriter of the Year	"Manodzi"	Pending	
2024	Ghana Music Awards UK	Best Music Video of the Year	"Manodzi"	Pending	
2024	Ghana Music Awards UK	Best Music Video of the Year	"Into the Future"	Pending	
2024	Ghana Music Awards UK	Best Afropop Song of the Year	"Into the Future"	Pending	
2024	Ghana Music Awards UK	Best Afropop Song of the Year	"Not God (Remix)"	Pending	
2024	Ghana Music Awards UK	Best Afrobeats Song of the Year	"Likor"	Pending	
2025	Telecel Ghana Music Awards	Best Music Video of the Year	Jejereje	Won	
2025	Telecel Ghana Music Awards	Reggae/Dancehall Artiste of the Year		Won	
2025	Telecel Ghana Music Awards	Best Reggae/Dancehall Song of the Year	Psalm 23	Won	

=== Entertainment Achievement Awards ===
In March 2021, his album Anloga Junction won the Album of the Year award in the Entertainment Achievement Awards. He also won the Male Artist of the Year Award.

=== 3Music Awards ===
In March 2021, his album Anloga Junction won the Album of the Year award in the 3Music Awards. His song Putuu Freestyle (Prayer) won the Viral Song of the Year.

=== International Reggae and World Music Awards (IRAWMA) ===
In May 2021, he was nominated for the 'Best African Dancehall Entertainer Award'.

He has been honored by Billboard after securing 8th position on Reggae Chart and received a plaque.

== Personal life ==
Stonebwoy is married to Dr. Louisa, a dental surgeon and ambassador for World Oral Health with two children, Catherine Jidula Satekla and L Janam Joachim Satekla.
