= Shatta Rako =

Ghanaian musician (born 1979)

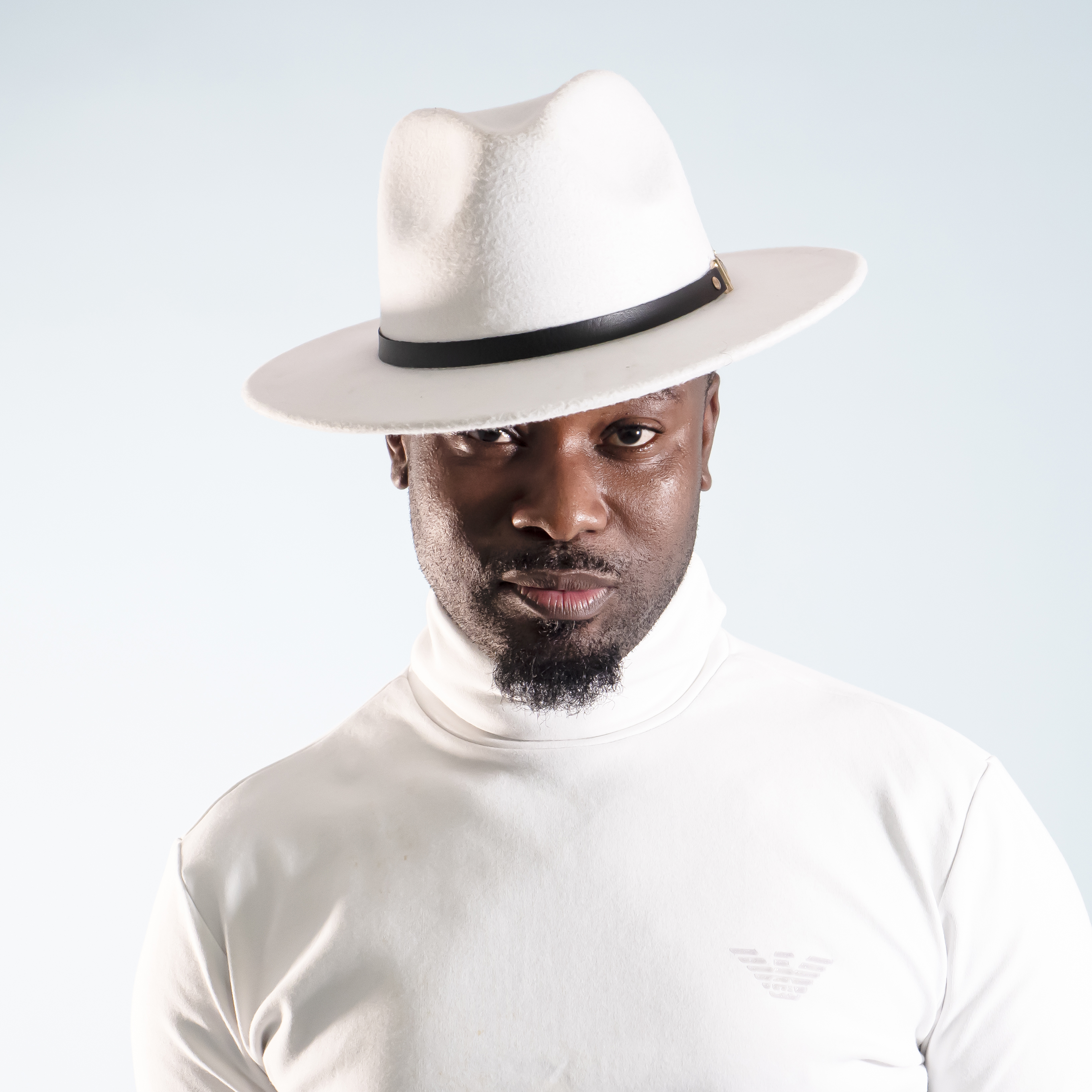
- Shatta Rako in 2021

Background information
- Also known as: Kojo Legend; Original Shatta Rako
- Born: Rexford Kojo Amoah; 12 November 1979 (age 47); Agona Mankrong, Central Region, Ghana
- Genres: Reggae; dancehall; afrobeats
- Occupations: Musician; graphic designer
- Years active: 2005–present
- Labels: Rudebouy Records; TalentOverHype Music Group
- Spouse: Naa Adukwei

Rexford Kojo Amoah (born 12 November 1979), known professionally as Shatta Rako, is a Ghanaian dancehall and afrobeats musician, graphic designer and the CEO of creative business Legend Studios.

Rako won the Songwriter of the Year at the 2016 BASS Awards.

== Early life and education ==
Rexford Kojo Amoah was born on 12 November 1979 in Agona Mankrong, a village in the Central Region of Ghana to Mr Justice Charles Amoah and Ms Mercy Mensah.

He started his basic education at CRIG Primary School and attended Junior High School at CRIG JSS, both in New Tafo, in the Eastern Region of Ghana. He then pursued a Visual Art course at Adisadel College, Cape Coast – Ghana. In Adisadel College he joined the School Choir and was an active member until he left the school in 1997.

== Personal life ==
He gained admission to the College of Art faculty of the Kwame Nkrumah University of Science and Technology, in 1999 where he continued his love for music and entertainment by working as a radio show host and DJ on Contatto radio amongst presenters like Blakk Rasta, and Norcus.

He moved to London in 2003 where he continued his radio and music business as a stuff team player of Rainbow Radio alongside his work as a professional Graphic Designer.

He originated his stage name from the Jamaican name, Shotta and made it into his own "Shatta".

Shatta Rako is married to Naa Adukwei.

== Music career ==
Shatta Rako's music career began to take shape after his return from the United Kingdom in 2005. He released his debut single, NFONI, which gained attention and became popular in the Reggae/Dancehall genre. At the time, few artists in Ghana were actively pursuing Reggae/Dancehall, making Shatta Rako one of the few prominent figures in the genre alongside others such as General Marcus, Mr. Root Eye, Yoggi Doggy, Sonni Balli, and Scooby Selah.

Known for his vocal range and adaptability to different musical styles, Shatta Rako collaborated with several prominent Ghanaian artists, including Jewel Ackah, Kofi B, Daasebre Dwamena, Pat Thomas, Kwame Adinkra, Kofi Nti, and Mr. Root Eye. His ability to blend reggae and dancehall with local music influences contributed to his recognition within the Ghanaian music industry.

He is known for singles such as TekOver, MakeMoney, Roll Call, Too Late, and State of Emergency. His song State of Emergency earned him the Songwriter of the Year award at the 2016 BASS Awards.

== Mentorship and influence ==
Throughout his career, Shatta Rako has worked with and mentored several emerging artists. Among those he has influenced is Nigerian musician and entrepreneur Oluwatosin Ajibade, known professionally as Mr. Eazi. Mr. Eazi has publicly acknowledged Shatta Rako's role in his development as an artist, referring to him as a "legend."

In addition to his music career, Shatta Rako is a professional graphic designer. He is the founder and CEO of Legend Studios and Creative Home, companies specializing in graphic design and multimedia production.

== Discography ==
Albums	Years
Nfoni	2005
Redefined	2008
Klassic Remixes	2013
Preface	2016

== Singles ==
Single	Date of publishing	Producer
Sete – Dancehall	2011	Kofi Ackah
Good Gurl Gone Bad	2011	Kofi Ackah
Agoro ft. Kapusta/Breden	2011	Kofi Ackah
Shame of the Game	2012	Kofi Ackah
Odo Ho Akyere no	2012	Collins Tee
Luv How Mi Dweet	2013	Kofi Ackah
Rudebouy Luv	15 July 2014	Riddim Boss
Gud4Evil	14 September 2014	Nature
Animal Farm	9 December 2016	Riddim Boss
Gyal ina mi DP	2014	Riddim Boss
Cry No More	2014	
Real Ting	9 January 2015	Killbeats
Cold War	14 February 2015	Riddim Boss
Keep it Simple	4 May 2015	Cabum
State of Emergency	8 June 2015	Riddim Boss
State of Emergency (Remix)	21 July 2015	Riddim Boss
TekOver Makemoney	21 September 2015	Cabum
Dutty Mind	10 August 2015	
Gyallis	12 November 2015	Peweezel
Never Say Never	15 December 2015	1Kwame
Bitter Truth	2 March 2016	Riddim Boss
Twerk	30 March 2016	
One Day	8 June 2016	1Kwame
Clean Da Dance	8 August 2016	Riddim Boss
Mede3	28 November 2016	
Fake Nigga Tricks	1 January 2017	1Kwame
Party Anthem	21 July 2017	Peweezel
Likkle Chat	8 January 2018	1Kwame
Mic Check	13 April 2018	King Dee
TekOver, Makemoney Remix Feat. David Lutalo	21 May 2018	
Talk2dem	18 December 2018	Chensee
We Dey Bet	24 June 2019	1Kwame
Best Friend (Feat. Kwame Adinkra)		Collins Tee
Dem Nuh Thug	7 April 2020	Riddim Boss
Tattoo	23 April 2020	Riddim Boss
Too Late	12 November 2020	Kaysam Teknik
Mama II	9 May 2021	Kaysam Teknik
Madman	4 June 2021	1Kwame
Focus	9 July 2021	Red Eye (Nature)
God4Bid	October 2021	Shatta Rako
Heaven No Beer	October 2021	Shatta Rako
Will Be There	12 November 2021	Riddim Boss
Dying to Survive	29 January 2022	Shatta Rako
Happy Birthday	12th November, 2024	Dj Phenzy
Detty December	12th December, 2025	Shatta Rako
Ghana Black Stars	26th April, 2026	Shatta Rako
Oheneba (Reggae)	26th June, 2026	Shatta Rako
