= Joe-Fio Neenyann Meyer =

Ghanaian diplomat and trade unionist

Ambassador of Ghana to Tanzania
- In office 1961–1963
- Preceded by: Office created
- Succeeded by: E. Kofi Sekyiamah

Ambassador of Ghana to China
- In office 1964 – 24 February 1966
- Preceded by: James Mercer
- Succeeded by: Bediako Poku

Personal details
- Born: Joe-Fio Neenyann Meyer; June 17, 1918 Accra, British Gold Coast
- Died: 31 December 1999 (aged 81)

Joe-Fio Neenyann Meyer (born 17 June 1918) was a Ghanaian diplomat and trade unionist.

== Early years and education ==
He was born in Accra, British Gold Coast. Joe-Fio had his early education at Accra Royal School from 1925 to 1928, he later proceeded to John Aglionby (bishop) Boys' School from 1929 to 1934 then the Accra Academy where he obtained his secondary education. He entered Tetteh's Business College and Scriba Commercial Institute, he obtained a group diploma in Secretaryship at the London School of Accountancy in 1955. He had an extra mural education at the University College of the Gold Coast then later studied at Ruskin College, Oxford, on ICFTU Scholarship which took him to the British TUC, the French Trade Union Headquarters, Force Ouvriere, Paris, and the Office of the Belgian Workers Movement Brussels, LC.

== Career ==
He was first employed by the Société commerciale de l'Ouest africain (S.C.O.A.) Headquarters in Accra from 1937 to 1958.

He was Gold Coast's Ballroom dance Champion in 1942. He was a Red Cross member for life in 1944. In 1945, he received the Duke of Gloucester's Certificate for Red Cross War effort and also received General de Gaulle's word of thanks. He became President of the Bishop boys' Old Boys' association in 1945.

In 1951 he was elected General Secretary of the trade union of the Société commerciale de l'Ouest africain. From 1952 to 1954 he was a member of the Salary Board (Retail Trade Workers). He became a member of the Central Advisory Committee on health services from 1953 to 1956. He was also a member of the Local Employment Committee from 1954 to 1957.

In 1955 he was made Treasurer of the Ghana Education Workers Association. The following year, he became a Fellow of the British Chamber of Commerce and also a member of the Industrial Welfare Society (London). That same year, he was promoted to Assistant to the Technical Department Manager at S.C.O.A. after 20 years of meritorious service to the company. At the 13th Annual Conference, in Sekondi-Takoradi he was elected President of the Ghana Trades Union Congress and also served as Director of Education. He was an Affiliate Member of the Institute of Personnel Management (London).

In 1957 he was a member of the Advisiory Work Committee and also a member of the College of Technology Council. That same year he was made the President of the Association of Students of the International Confederation of Free Trade Unions in Brussels. He was a member of the seven men Management Committee of the Accra Municipality. At the 40th International Labour Conference in 1957, he participated in a study tour of trade unions, the factories and office cooperatives in Belgium, France, the Netherlands, Portugal, Switzerland, Tunisia, United Kingdom and the Labor movement representing Ghana. He also participated in the conference at: Commonwealth Trade Union Group in Geneva and the 5th Afro-Asian World Congress of the International Confederation of Free Trade Unions in Tunisia that same year.

In 1958 he was elected President of the executive board of the Ghana Trades Union Congress and appointed vice-president of the Builders Brigade Council with the rank of Lieutenant. He retired as Product Assistant/Technical Manager in that same year.

== Diplomatic duties ==
In 1960 he was assigned to the Ministry of Foreign Affairs as the first labour attaché and was sent to Lagos, he was appointed Commissioner to Nairobi.

From 1961 to 1963 he was Ghana's High Commissioner to Tanzania at Dar es Salaam (then Tanganyika).

From 1964 to February 24, 1966, he was Ghana's ambassador to China at Beijing with accreditation to Pyongyang, (North Korea) and Hanoi, (North Vietnam).

He was responsible for the preparation of the state visit of Kwame Nkrumah to Hanoi, North Vietnam on 21 February 1966 to resolve the Vietnam War. It was during this period of Nkrumah's absence that a coup d'état was instigated on 24 February 1966 to overthrow him from power.
