= Ian Jazzi =

Ghanaian rapper

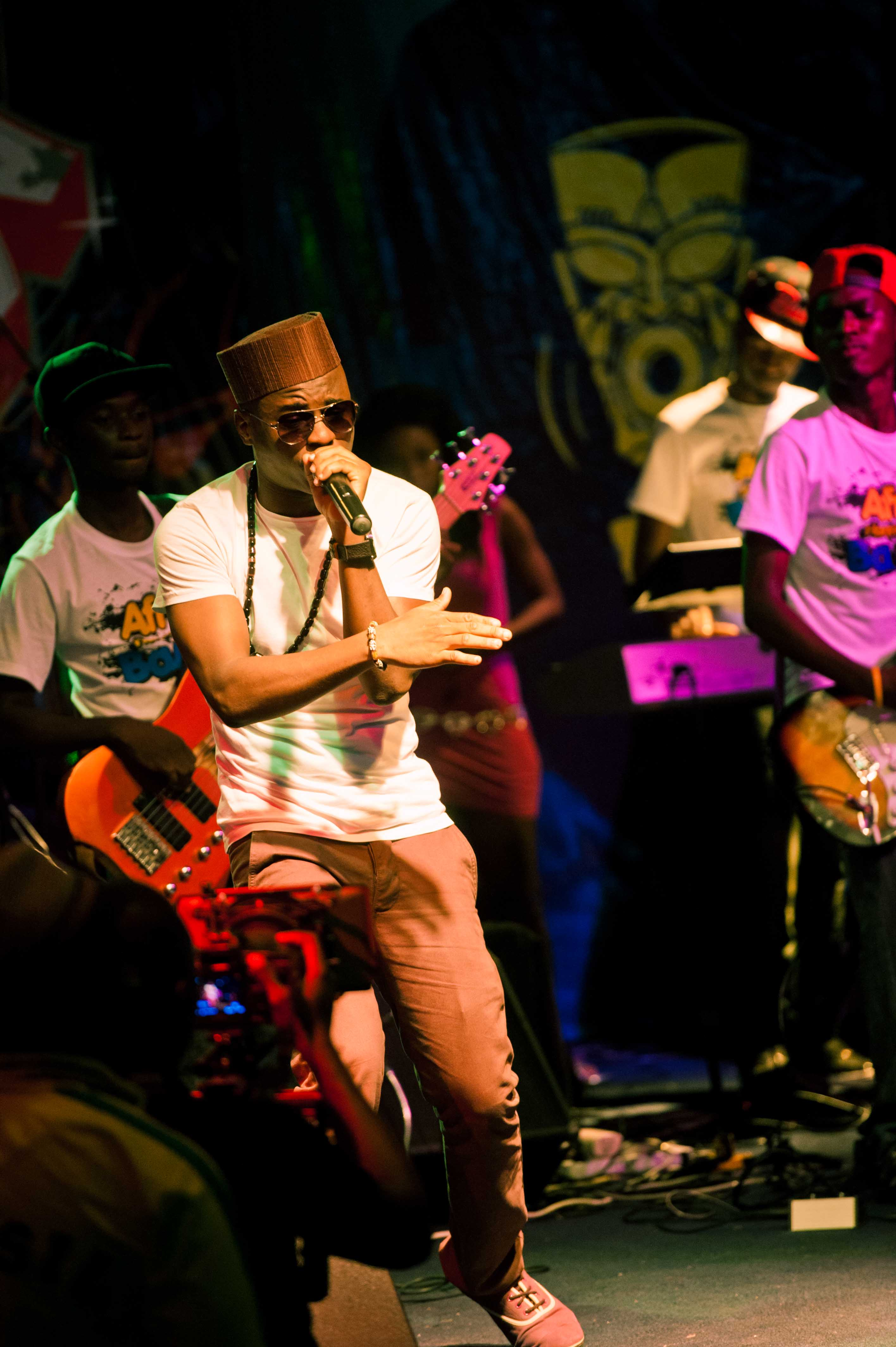
- Jazzi on Stage

Background information
- Born: Ian Frederick Oshodi; 30 March 1986 (age 40); Osu, Accra, Ghana
- Genres: Hip hop; Hiplife; soul; gospel
- Occupations: Rapper; actor; entrepreneur
- Instruments: Vocals; keyboard
- Years active: 2007–present
- Label: UnwindENT
- Website: ianjazzi.com

Ian Frederick Oshodi (born 30 March 1986), better known by his stage name Ian Jazzi, is a Ghanaian rapper, actor and entrepreneur. He inspired a new wave of Gospel Rap in Ghana, after dropping popular singles "Get Some" and "Get Your Clap On" in 2003. Both were produced by Jayso. He is also credited with being among the pioneers of GH Rap which is a term to denote 'Hip-hop made in Ghana'.

In 2009, Jazzi worked on an award-winning TV Commercial by Creative Eye, shot by Fingerprint Films, for the telecommunication company TIGO in Mumbai, India. Jazzi is also the creative director of The Unwind Agency, a model & advertising agency he founded in Ghana in 2009. In 2010, he co-produced and released his first mixtape album In Stereo Volume 1, which was well received in Ghana. Ian has also had opportunities to model for multi-national corporations such as Coca-Cola, and has been the face of several advertising campaigns which include newspaper & magazine ads, billboards, and TV commercials.

== Early life and education ==
Ian Jazzi was born to Frederick Oshodi and Patience Otuwaa Amponsah in Osu, Accra in Ghana. His father, a wealthy Nigerian businessman, died in a car accident before Jazzi's birth. His mother moved back to Ghana after Oshodi's death in Lagos. Jazzi attended the Datus Complex School, a boarding school in Tema. When he was twelve, he lost his elder sister Gifty-Jenny who was thirteen at the time and it was very hard on him because they very close.

== Music career ==
Ian took rapping seriously while in high school at Adisadel College in 2001. Inspired by the vibrant entertainment nights and hip-hop culture in the school and heavily influenced by the 90's hip-hop scene, he would use his leisure time to beat his desk in the classroom and write rhymes. Upon graduation, he was admitted into The University of Ghana, Legon, where he studied economics, Mathematics & Theatre Arts. While at university, he continued rapping and began recording and airing singles on the campus radio station, Radio Universe.

In March 2010, Ian Jazzi released his first mixtape, In Stereo Vol.1. While Jazzi was responsible for most of the production, it also featured productions from EL, the Canadian Producer Tnyce, Six45, and Jae Milla. It featured singers Raquel, Taurian Devueax and Yolanda Chioma Richards-Albert.

In October 2010, Ian Jazzi released his second mixtape, Ian Jazzi on the Heartbeats & Other Freestyles. This mixtape primarily featured Ian Jazzi freestyling over beats by renowned Ghanaian producer Jayso. It was a remix of hits produced for artists like Sarkodie, Sway DaSafo, R2Bees, and Kwaw Kesse. The purpose of the mixtape was to showcase Jazzi's versatile rap skills over more commercial beats; his poetic style, like his lyrical style, is primarily socially conscious, integrating elements of inspiration and spirituality.

In October 2010, Jazzi turned his attention to his new company, The Unwind Agency, completing several model and advertising related contracts for companies such as TIGO, Ecobank, and Coca-Cola. In addition he also released several singles featuring artists like EL, Trigmatic, Jay Foley, Senam E.Twin Gbeho, and Radio Jock/rapper J.O.E.L. In the latter part of 2010 he collaborated with his friend EL and released "Envy". In February 2011, Ian Jazzi released his first music video, "The Real", off his upcoming sequel In Stereo Volume II – Turn The Volume Up and quickly followed it up with "Envy", in March 2011.

In August 2013, Ian Jazzi released the 32 track In Stereo Volume II – Turn The Volume Up mixtape, which featured Multi-Platinum Producer Coptic, rappers, Psalm 1, the Christ Junkie and D.E.M.

== Acting career ==
While in High School, Jazzi was vice-president of the Drama club and was involved in most of the schools theatre productions. At the University of Ghana, he played Duncan in Shakespeare's Macbeth, and the role of Jerry in Harold Pinters 'Betrayal', among others.

=== Television ===
In 2008, Ian Jazzi hosted the NT1 poetry show on TV Africa, a studio recording of poets performing the spoken word, which lasted for a single season of 16 episodes. In 2010, Jazzi was contracted by Rite Multimedia, to host Basket Ball TV, also on TV Africa. The show covered the ongoing inter-community basketball competition held at Elwak Stadium, and was usually transmitted live from the stadium.

Also in 2010, Jazzi played the role of a playboy in Desperation, a romantic-comedy television series, directed by Dickson Dzapasu, which aired night-time in Ghana and Nigeria. In 2012, he played the role of a rich and arrogant youth who got into trouble in the investigative TV series, Peep, which was produced and directed by Shirley Frimpong Manso. In 2013, Jazzi played the role of Nana in the African movie, Potomanto, which was also produced and directed by Manso.

== Discography ==
=== Albums ===
1. In Stereo Volume 1 (2010)
2. Heartbeats & Other Freestyles (2010)
3. In Stereo Volume 2 – Turn The Volume Up (2013)
4. "O.K.K. (Osu King Kong)" (2016)
5. Lockdown 'N Chaos (2020)
6. I Wuz Hia Som - 1 Form One Boy (2021)
7. 1NDouble (2024)
8. I Wuz Hia Som - I Dey 2oo Form (2025)

== Television & Movies ==
1. Desperation (2010)
2. Peep, (2013)
3. Potomanto, (2013)
