= Ernest Bediako Sampong =

Ghanaian pharmacist

- Born: Ghana
- Education: Adisadel College
- Alma mater: Kwame Nkrumah University of Science and Technology
- Occupations: Pharmacist, Businessman
- Organization: Ernest Chemist Limited

Ernest Bediako Sampong (born June 1956) is a Ghanaian Pharmacist and Businessman. He is the Founder and chief executive officer (CEO) of Ernest Chemist and was awarded The Man of The Year at EMY Africa Awards in 2020.

== Early life and education ==
He completed his secondary education at Adisadel College in Cape Coast, Ghana. He attended the University of Ghana Medical School before leaving to study in Kwame Nkrumah University of Science and Technology, where he obtained a Bachelor of Science degree in pharmacy.

== Career ==
Sampong is the current CEO and founder of Ernest Chemists Limited. The Pharmaceutical Manufacturers Association in Ghana is led by him as its president. In 2009, He established NestPharma Company Limited in Freetown, Sierra Leone.

== Achievements and awards ==
Ernest has won awards and recognition in entrepreneurship and pharmacy.

Awards And Honours
CIMG Marketing Man of The Year	CIMG
Ghana's Order of the Volta (Officer Category)	Government of Ghana
2017 CEO of the Year	Ghana Pharma Awards
2017 People's Choice Practitioners	The Heleh Africa Honours
2017 Man of the Year, Health	EMYAfrica Awards
2018 CEO of the Year	Ghana CEO Excellence Awards
2019 CEO of the Year	Ghana Pharma Awards
2019 CEO of the Year	Ghana CEO Summit
2020 Man of the Year	EMYAfrica Awards
