= Menzgold Ghana Limited =

Gold dealership and investment firm

Menzgold Ghana Limited was a fraudulent gold dealership and investment firm that promised customers an average of 7-10 percent monthly returns on investments. It was subsequently shut down by the Government of Ghana. It was founded by Nana Appiah Mensah, who is popularly known as NAM 1. The firm is reported to have initially traded as Menzbank; then changed to Menzbanc and then finally to Menzgold, due to warnings from the Bank of Ghana about the use of 'bank' as a company name for a non-banking entity. As of 2025, NAM1 has been summoned to the Supreme Court of Justice to face trial

== Controversy ==
=== Private Investigations by Israel Laryea ===
Israel Laryea, a journalist, sought to throw more light into the activities of Menzgold and paid a visit to London where he visited the commercial property "Berkeley Square House". He stated that it was the location of Menzgold's London Office as was stated on the then company website. In the investigative video that was circulated on all social media platforms in July 2018, he stated he was going to enter the building and proceed to the Menzgold Office and purport to buy gold. After a failed attempt to enter and actually interact with the occupants of the office, he indicated the security was tight and could not film the lobby and would have to pose as one looking for an office space to rent.

This sparked controversies by the public and was branded a shabby investigation by notable journalists such as Chris-Vincent Agyapong. Chris-Vincent fired Israel in an attempt to save face following the poor investigation done which was made public after using the news agencies resources.

Nana Appiah took to Instagram to express his sheer disappointment in the work done by Israel.

=== Operations Shut Down ===
Its operations were shut down in September 2018, by the Ghana Securities and Exchange Commission (SEC). The company's operating license which had initially been granted in 2014, was revoked by the Minerals Commission of Ghana since it had primarily been for gold trading and export. However, as reports of a gold-investment scheme with high returns started to circulate, the Bank of Ghana began to publish warnings which cautioned citizens to be wary of dealing with the firm and warned the firm against taking cash deposits.

Customers who deposited at Menzgold have been locked out since the shutdown and cannot access their investments, leading to demonstrations at its various branches. In January 2019, the Economic and Organized Crime Office (EOCO) of Ghana, secured a court order to freeze all landed properties and vehicles belonging to the embattled Chief Executive Officer of Menzgold Ghana Limited, Nana Appiah Mensah. The landed properties include Menzgold Ghana Limited, Menzgold Office Complex, Zylofon Art Complex, Brew Marketing Consult, Star Mad. Football Club, Zylofon Music and Media Company Limited, Brew Energy Company Limited and G. Tech Automobile Service. On Wednesday, January 8, 2020 some aggrieved customers of Menzgold Ghana Limited massed up at the residence of Nana Appiah Mensah to discuss payments of their locked up funds. Nana Appiah Mensah fired shots to ward off his angry customers.

=== Self-Acclaimed "Biggest Loser" on Twitter Spaces ===
Nana Appiah joined an interactive space hosted by the journalist Serwaa Amihere where he promised to answer questions from the public. He was expected to provide the general public with real answers regarding their locked-up funds. He referred to himself as the biggest loser of all saying;

"If you want to crown the biggest loser in all of this thing, I am the one, because I lost everything: I lost all my properties and I don't even have a car of my own in this country[Ghana]."

But his appeal did not sit right with the listeners and he was branded all sorts of names.

=== Call for Arrest and Prosecution ===
Kwame A Plus, a prominent figure in Ghana's entertainment and political spheres, recently made a fervent call for the arrest of Nana Appiah Mensah, who is widely recognized as Nam1 and is the former chief executive officer (CEO) of Menzgold, the controversial investment company that's facing legal issues and financial troubles in the country. During the August 26 episode of the United Showbiz Show, Kwame A-plus raised an important question about Nana Appiah Mensah (Nam1). A-plus questioned why Nam1 is still free to move around despite serious allegations against him, emphasizing that individuals facing fraud accusations in developed countries would likely have been arrested.

== Payment Verification Card ==
In August 2023, Nana Appiah Mensah demanded that victims of the Menzgold scam who were indebted by the scam to further purchase a 650 Ghana Cedis Menzgold Digital Verification Access Card in order to verify their transactions. The claim was that it would enable the verification of the people who claim to have been indebted by the company. This decision was later rescinded after public backlash.

== Demand for Justice ==
The Attorney-General and Minister for Justice, Godfred Yeboah Dame, at the 40th International Symposium on Economic Crime held on September 4, 2023, stated that the victims of the Menzold scam will be served justice. This follows the 39 charges the Attorney-General(AG) filed against Nana Appiah Mensah on August 30, 2023. The (AG) announced that the dockets for persecution against Nana Appiah is almost ready as they have undertaken "painstaking investigations" into building the dockets.
