= Verdiana Masanja =

Tanzanian mathematician

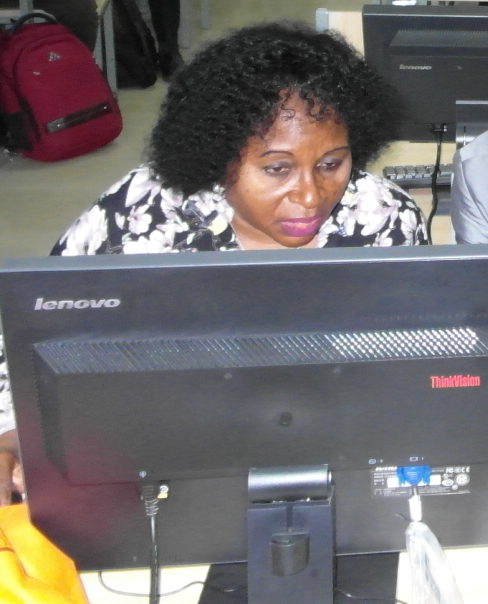
- Born: Tanzania
- Education: M.S. in mathematics and physics PhD in Fluid dynamics
- Alma mater: University of Dar es Salaam Technische Universität Berlin
- Occupation: Mathematician

Verdiana Grace Masanja (née Kashaga, born October 12, 1954) is a Tanzanian mathematician specializing in fluid dynamics. She is the first Tanzanian woman to earn a doctorate in mathematics.

== Education ==
Masanja was born in Bukoba, at the time part of the United Nations trust territory of Tanganyika. She was a student at the Jangwani Girls Secondary School in Dar es Salaam and then at the University of Dar es Salaam, completing a degree in mathematics and physics in 1976 and a master's degree in 1981. Her master's thesis was Effect of Injection on Developing Laminar Flow of Reiner–Philippoff Fluids in a Circular Pipe.

She earned a second master's degree in physics and completed her doctorate in fluid dynamics at Technische Universität Berlin. Her dissertation, A Numerical Study of a Reiner–Rivlin Fluid in an Axi-Symmetrical Circular Pipe, was jointly supervised by Wolfgang Muschik and Gerd Brunk.

== Career ==
Already, while a master's student, Masanja had become a lecturer at the University of Dar es Salaam, and on her return from Germany she became a professor there, and remained on the university's faculty until 2010. In 2006 she began teaching as well at the National University of Rwanda, and in 2007 became a professor there, as well as being appointed as the university's director of research, and as deputy vice chancellor and senior advisor at the University of Kibungo in Rwanda. In 2018 she returned to Tanzania as a professor of applied and computational mathematics at the Nelson Mandela African Institute of Science and Technology in Arusha.

Masanja has served as vice president for Eastern Africa of the African Mathematical Union, chaired the African Mathematical Union Commission on Women in Mathematics in Africa and the Tanzania Education Network, and has served as National Coordinator for Female Education in Mathematics in Africa. Masanja will be a speaker at the 11th International Congress on Industrial and Applied Mathematics (ICIAM) in July 2027.

== Research ==
Masanja has published scientific articles on modelling transport of heavy metals, rabies persistence, lumpy skin disease and wireless sensor networks.She has also published on the education and participation of women in science.

Masanja is editor-in-chief of the Rwanda Journal.
