= Thomas Mends Kodwo-Mercer =

Ghanaian diplomat (1916 –2003)

Ghanaian High Commissioner to United Kingdom
- In office 1954–1956

Personal details
- Born: 17 January 1916
- Died: 2003 (aged 86–87) Luton
- Occupation: Chairman

Thomas Mends Kodwo-Mercer (also known as T. M. Kodwo Mercer 1916– 2003) was a Ghanaian diplomat. He was the first Black African from the Gold Coast (currently Ghana) to be appointed as a High Commissioner to the UK.

== Early life and education ==
Mercer was born on 17 January 1916. He attended Achimota Training College. He also attended Adisadel College where he later became a tutor from 1938 to 1943. He further studied commerce at Birmingham University in 1948.

== Political life ==
Mercer was a member of the Convention People's Party.

== Career ==
Mercer was the Gold Coast Commissioner to the UK from 1954 to 1956. He was the Chairman of the Cocoa Purchasing Company, Agricultural Produce Marketing Board and the Cocoa Marketing Board.

== Personal life ==
Mercer was the twin brother of James Mercer and their younger brother was Mr. Krakue Mercer. Ekwow Spio-Gabrah and Andrew Egyapa Mercer were his nephews. Sally Mugabe was his niece. He was an Anglican.

== Death and burial ==
He died at 86 years and was buried in London.
