= Nana Appiah Mensah =

Ghanaian businessman

Nana Appiah Mensah popularly known as NAM1, is a Ghanaian business man known for the menzgold fraud. He is married to Rose Mensah, who was charged by the state as a coconspirator.

== Education ==
Nana Appiah Mensah had his secondary school education at Adisadel College in the Cape Coast. He went on to further his education at University of Ghana, Legon.

== Career ==
In 2016, He founded Zylofon Media, a multimedia company which he used to recruit notable musicians like Shatta Wale, Stonebwoy, Becca, Kumi Guitar, and Joyce Blessing. Zylofon Media also extended its reach to the film industry, signing popular actors like Benedicta Gafah, and Toosweet Annan. He used this in recruiting victims for the menzgold scam. The company was eventually shut down by the Ghana Securities and Exchange Commission.

== Menzgold fraud ==
On 9 January 2019, a circuit court issued a warrant to arrest Mensah for money laundering and fraud causing the Criminal Investigations Department of the Ghana Police Service to trigger an Interpol red alert. He was also charged because his company was unlicensed to take deposits and is said to have defrauded by false pretense. In the fall of 2023, the A-G announced that he would take over the prosecution of the Menzgold case, slapping him with 39 counts of various charges.

== Restitution of Menzgold victims ==
In September 2018, Menzgold took the Securities and Exchange Commission, Ghana (SEC) and the Bank of Ghana (BOG) to court after its license was revoked by the SEC. Mensah returned to Ghana in July 2019, claiming he had been acquitted in Dubai and would assist authorities in paying back Menzgold customers. While victims remain unpaid, supporters of Nana Appiah Mensah insisted he was being unfairly treated by the government.

Menzgold insisted that they were to be paid by order of Dubai court a sum of $39 million as payment of the Gold supplied to Royal Diamonds in three weeks. Along with compensation for wrongful incarceration. Nana Appiah Mensah arrived in Ghana on 11 July to be interrogated by the Criminal Investigation Department of the Ghana Police Service.

On 18 August 2023, Nana Appiah Mensah, attempted to further raise more money from his victims through a purported Digital Verification Access Card priced at GHC650. He insisted it was a requirement to verify claims before victims will be paid. After substantial public outrage, the decision was rescinded.

== Prosecution ==
Nana Appiah Mensah and his companies were charged with 39 counts of various offences on August 30, 2023 including unlicensed gold sales, unauthorized deposit-taking, investment inducement, defrauding by false pretences, fraudulent breach of trust, and money laundering involving over GH₵340 million.

== Achievements ==
- 2 Awards for his contribution and Excellence in Business Development.- Blackstar Line Cooperative Credit Union, in conjunction with the Marcus Garvey Foundation presented two award plaques to NAM 1 for his contribution to Business Development with his list of entities.
- Donated GHc 20,000 to Ghana U17 and U20
- Special Recognition Award for Business Innovation at the Exclusive Men Of The Year Africa Awards 2017.
- 4syte Music Video Awards 2017 - Lifetime Achievement Award.
- Business Category - 50 Most Influential Young Ghanaians.
- Special Award - 2018 Radio and Television Personality (RTP) Awards before popping up second on a list of the Most Influential Entertainment Personality in Ghana for 2018 behind the chief executive officer of EiB Network, Kwabena Adisi known as ‘Bola Ray’.
- 100 Most Influential Young Persons in Africa by the Confederation of West African Youth (CWAY) in July 2018.
- 8th Ghana Entrepreneur and Corporate Executive Awards in April 2018 - Best Business Executive of the Year.
- November 2018 - Special Award at the Ghana Music Awards South Africa.
- 2nd Most Influential Entertainment Personality in Ghana for 2018.
- Acquiring lower-tier Star Madrid FC, NAM 1 through one of his companies Zylofon Cash signing a five-year deal worth $10 million to become the headline sponsors of the Ghana Premier League in May 2018.
- Special Recognition Award for Business Innovation at the Exclusive Men Of The Year Africa Awards (EMY AFRICA) in June 2017.
