= James Mercer (diplomat) =

Ghanaian diplomat (1984-1985)

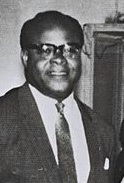
- Mercer at the Ghanaian embassy in Tel Aviv, 1964

Ghanaian Ambassador to China es:Anexo:Embajadores de Ghana en China
- In office 1962–1963
- Preceded by: es:Cobina Kessie
- Succeeded by: Joe-Fio Neenyann Meyer

Ghanaian Ambassador to Israel
- In office 1964–1966
- Preceded by: es:Bediako Poku
- Succeeded by: Stephen Joseph Asamoah Otu (1915–1979)

Personal details
- Born: 17 January 1916
- Died: 17 September 1985 (aged 69)

James Mercer (17 January 1916 – 17 September 1985) was a Ghanaian diplomat who was Ambassador to Israel during the 1960s. He was also a prominent lawyer and businessman, becoming the founding chairman of the now-defunct Ghana Airways.

== Early life ==
Mercer was born in Sekondi-Takoradi, Ghana on 17 January 1916. His twin brother was Thomas Mends Kodwo-Mercer (1916–2003), and both attended Adisadel College, Cape Coast, as did many of his siblings, children and grandchildren, a long-standing tradition of his family.

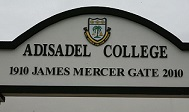
James Mercer Gate, Adisadel College, Cape Coast

== Career ==
Mercer was a prominent lawyer, working during the government of Kwame Nkrumah and beyond. Mercer was a barrister-at-law at the Sekondi Bar, Chairman of the Ghana/Ivory Coast Border Commission and first chairman of the now-defunct Ghana Airways.

- From 24 May 1962 to 1963 he was ambassador to Peking.
- From 1 July 1964 to 24 February 1966 he was ambassador to Tel Aviv (Ghana–Israel relations).

== Personal life and death ==
James Mercer was the father of Andrew Egypa Mercer, a current member of parliament for Sekondi and Esther Mercer. He was also the brother of Thomas Mends Kodwo-Mercer, the first Ghanaian High Commissioner to Britain from 1954 to 1956 and uncle of the former Minister of Trade and Industry, Ekwow Spio-Garbrah. James Mercer was also the uncle of late Sally Hayfron, first wife of Robert Mugabe.

James Mercer died on 17 September 1985, at the age of 69.
