= Joshua Owusu-Sekyere =

Reverend Professor Joshua Owusu-Sekyere is a Ghanaian academic and an Agricultural engineer. He is the current rector of the Perez University College.
