= Puerto Rican =

Puerto Rican may refer to:

- Something of or related to Puerto Rico, an archipelago located in the Caribbean and an unincorporated territory of the United States
- Puerto Ricans, people from Puerto Rico, the inhabitants and citizens of Puerto Rico, and their descendants
- Puerto Rican cuisine
- Puerto Rican culture
- Puerto Rican Spanish
- SS Puerto Rican, an oil tanker that exploded in 1984

== See also ==
- Demographics of Puerto Rico
