= Lartebiokorshie =

Lartebiokoshie
- Town
- Country: Ghana
- Region: Greater Accra Region
- District: Ablekuma Central Municipal Assembly
- Time zone: GMT
  - Summer (DST): GMT

Lartebiokoshie is a town in the Ablekuma Central Municipal Assembly, a district of the Greater Accra Region of Ghana.
