= James Hackman Tachie-Menson =

- Born: 4 April 1928; Cape Coast, Ghana
- Died: 9 February 2014 (aged 85); Jupiter, Florida, USA
- Occupations: Master mariner, ship's captain; musician and composer

Captain James Hackman ("J.H.") Tachie-Menson (4 April 1928 – 9 February 2014) was an African pioneer and musician, widely recognized as the first African Master Mariner/Ship's Captain. He gained additional recognition as the author of a number of choral compositions that have been performed by various choirs and musicians in Africa, the United Kingdom, and the United States.

== Early life ==
Captain Tachie-Menson was born on 4 April 1928 in Cape Coast, Ghana. He completed his secondary education at Adisadel College in Cape Coast, and later proceeded to Liverpool, England, in 1951 under a programme initiated by the Gold Coast Railway and Harbor Authority for the training of Africans to become pilots and tug-masters.

== Maritime career ==
=== Elder Dempster ===
Captain Tachie-Menson served in the British Merchant Navy from 1951 to 1960, on board various ships in the fleet of the Liverpool-based shipping company, Elder Dempster Lines, while simultaneously pursuing prescribed courses and maritime studies at the Liverpool Nautical College (now Maritime Academy at Liverpool John Moores University). He completed his four-year training as a Cadet on Elder Dempster's motor ship Macgregor Laird, and was quickly promoted through all the Navigational officer grades, from the rank of Third Mate to that of Chief Officer, on board various ships in Elder Dempster's fleet, including the Royal Mail and passenger liners, Accra, Apapa and MV Aureol, sailing regularly between Liverpool and the West Coast of Africa.

=== Master Mariner/Captain qualification ===
In 1960, Tachie-Menson acquired the British Board of Trade Certificate of Competency as Master Mariner, the qualification required for sailing as a captain on British ships as well as other commercial liners, giving him the distinction of being the first African south of the Sahara to be qualified to command a ship operating on international/trans-ocean voyages.

=== Black Star Line ===
Captain Tachie-Menson returned home to Ghana in 1960 on Elder Dempster's passenger liner, Aureol. Later that year, in response to an urgent call on him by the chairman and the board of directors of Ghana's rapidly expanding national shipping company, Black Star Line, which Dr. Kwame Nkrumah, the first President of Ghana, had formed soon after Ghana gained its independence from the United Kingdom, Captain Tachie-Menson joined the company. Shortly thereafter, he was appointed as captain of the S.S. Tano River, one of the four ships owned and operated by Black Star Line at the time, thereby becoming not only the first black African to ever be appointed to command a merchant navy ship, but also the first Ghanaian to become a Master Mariner and captain of a foreign-going vessel.

Captain Tachie-Menson continued his career as a captain with the Black Star Line's Fleet for several years, trailblazing several voyages across the Atlantic Ocean and through the Baltic and North Seas on the Tano River and subsequently the Nasia River. It was in his capacity as captain of these two ships that Tachie-Menson first gained recognition and reverence in the North American continent, especially by notable civil rights activists in the US. The Captain would later serve as chief superintendent of Black Star Line's marine office in London and, following his return to Ghana in the 1970s, became the managing director and CEO of Black Star Line.

=== Maritime organizations ===
Throughout his maritime career, Captain Tachie-Menson represented Ghana at several international maritime conferences, including the International Maritime Consultative Organization (IMCO) Loadline Conference of 1966, at which he proposed the extension of the Tropical Zone to incorporate the Canary Islands. That proposal, which was unanimously adopted, benefited the international maritime industry immensely by allowing ships to obtain maximum fuel in the Canary Islands, which in turn enabled them to travel further to ports in and beyond South Africa. Captain Tachie-Menson also served for approximately five years, as Chairman of the Association of African National Shipping Lines, was a leading member of the America-West Africa Freight Conference, and Principal of the United Kingdom-West Africa Lines Conference (UKWAL).

=== Presentation to Queen Elizabeth II ===
Notably, in July 1977, he was one of three shipping executives (from Ghana, Nigeria and the United Kingdom) who, with their wives, were presented to Her Majesty Queen Elizabeth II at a special maritime ceremony in England during the celebration of the Queen's Silver Jubilee Anniversary on the British throne.

=== Nigerian National Shipping Line and Grundstad Maritime ===
In 1980, as a result of political instability in his native country, Ghana, Captain Tachie-Menson returned to England and back to sea as captain on various vessels initially in the fleet of the Nigerian National Shipping Line, and subsequently with the fleet of Grundstad Maritime Overseas, Inc., a company founded by his longtime friend and shipping colleague, Oddmund Grundstad. In this latter capacity, Captain Tachie-Menson commanded various vessels, including oil tankers that sailed through the Suez Canal, the Red Sea, the Indian Ocean, and the Persian Gulf, as well as ports on the coasts of East Africa, the Arabian Peninsula, South Africa, the United Kingdom, Spain, Turkey, the United States, South America, Yugoslavia and Algeria.

=== Crown Cruise Line ===
In 1984, when Grundstad decided to enter the Cruise Line market in the United States, he called upon his close friend Captain Tachie-Menson to head up the operations. Tachie-Menson moved to the United States, where he served first as Director of Operations for the newly formed Crown Cruise Line in the Port of San Diego in California, and, subsequently, as Port Captain, General Manager and vice-president of the cruise line when it moved to the Port of Palm Beach in Florida. There, he oversaw operations of the company's cruise ships: Viking Princess, Crown Del Mar, Crown Monarch, Crown Jewel, and Crown Dynasty. He worked in this capacity until his retirement in the mid-1990s.

== Musical compositions ==
In addition to his accomplishments in the maritime industry, Captain Tachie-Menson was also a renowned musician, composer, conductor, editor, arranger and producer of choral music. His original compositions, a number of which were written while he was at sea, are established hymns in many churches in Ghana, and have also been sung by choirs in the United Kingdom and the United States. His notable musical compositions include "Where is our God in whom we trust?", "The New Born Prince of Peace", "Afrehyia-Pa", and "He is still our God" ("Leonora"). The tune from another of his original works, "Willevlutt", has become the preferred tune for singing the hymn "Hark, hark my soul" in Ghanaian churches and by Ghanaian choirs in various parts of the world. His compositions while living in the United States include an Opus Magnum, "How Lovely is Thy Dwelling", which he was invited to compose in commemoration of the 25th anniversary of Reverend Canon Kerry Robb as Rector of St. Mark's Episcopal Church in Palm Beach Gardens, where the Captain and his wife were members of the choir.

Besides composing music, Captain Tachie-Menson, a staunch Anglican/Episcopalian, also served as organist and choirmaster at various Anglican churches in Accra, Takoradi and Tema, most prominently at St. Barnabas Church in Osu.

== Personal ==
Captain Tachie-Menson lived in Jupiter, Florida, in the United States with his wife of 48 years, Veronica Tachie-Menson (née Hayford), until his death on 9 February 2014. He had nine children: Cynthia, James, Charlotte, Charles, Michael, Ursula, Vanessa, Odette and Oddmund.
