= Green Growth Africa =

Non-profit, non-government organization

- Green Growth Africa Sustainability Network
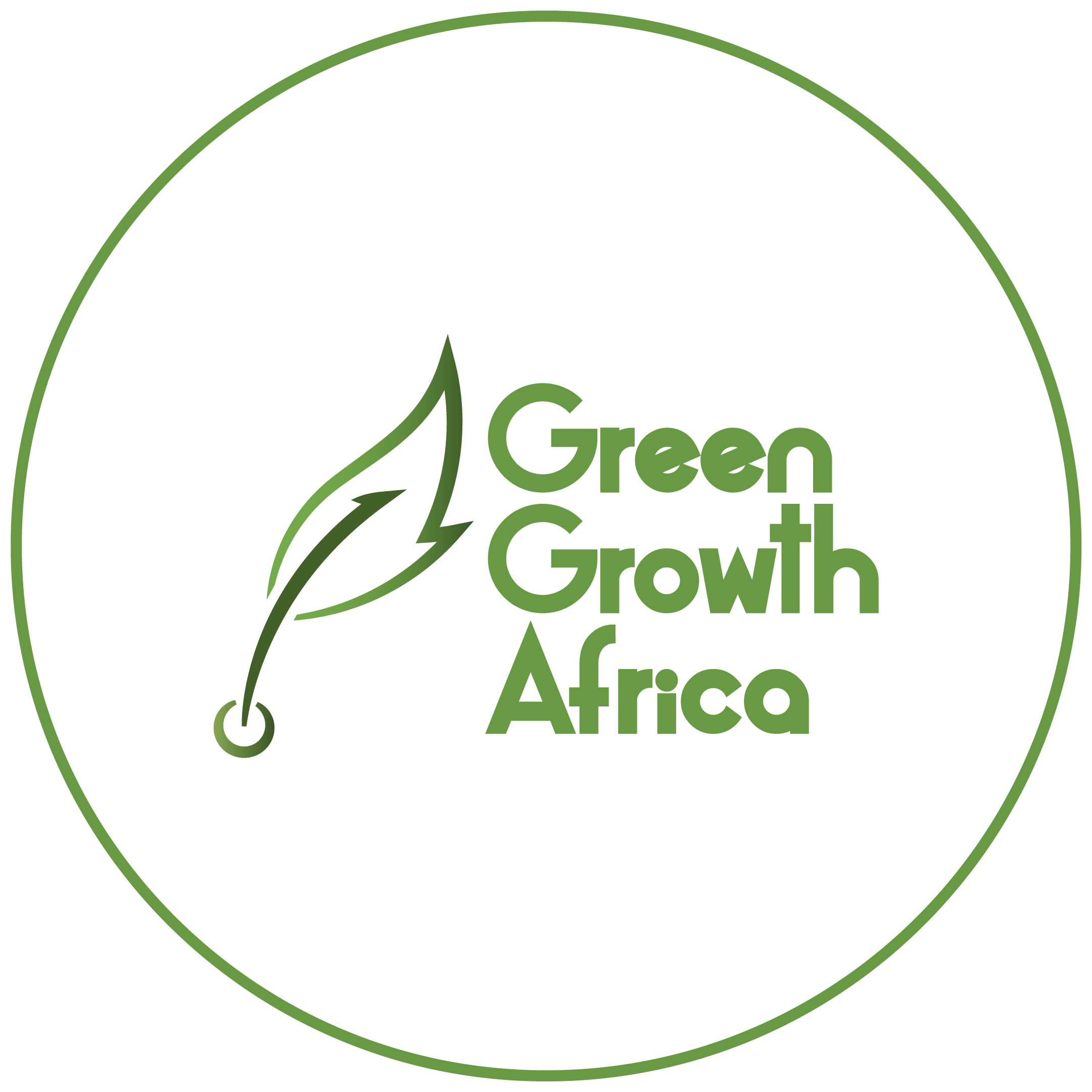
- Formation: 2022
- Founder: Adedoyin Adeleke
- Headquarters: Oyo State
- Location: Ibadan, Nigeria
- Services: Climate change, climate education, climate literacy, health initiative, climate change innovation
- Awards: The Okayama award for Education for Sustainable Development (ESD), the Pratt & Whitney E-STEM award
- Website: https://thegreengrowth.org/
- Formerly called: International Support Network for African Development (ISNAD-Africa)

Be Green Growth Africa (established 2022) is a non-profit, non-government organization. It is also known as Green Growth Africa Sustainability Network. It also stands as a UNEP-accredited non-governmental organisation. Hence, Green Growth Africa focuses on innovation, development, and implementation of ‘greened’ socio-economic development solutions that address Africa's development challenges on climate change, environmental sustainability and environmental education. Green Growth Africa was formerly known as the International Support Network for African Development (ISNAD-Africa). It was established in 2017. But in 2022 when the founder relocated to Nigeria, the name was changed to Green Growth Africa.

The term “Green” is now being linked to climate change and other sustainable development organization. Because of what green stands for, it presupposes that it will mitigate climate change through minimizing emissions, all hazards for clean environment, energy, as well as promote economy. The initiative and adoption of “Green” emphasizes the efforts in promoting eco-friendly environment for a safe planet.

== Administration of Green Growth Africa ==
Green Growth Africa is based in Ibadan, Oyo state, Nigeria. However, it operates in other Africa countries like Cameroon, Ghana, South Africa, Kenya, and Uganda. The executive director is Dr. Adedoyin Adeleke, who was made a co-chair of the United Nations Independent Group of Scientists (IGS) with the task of preparing the 2027 Global Sustainable Development Report (GSDR). According to the statement, "The appointment, made by United Nations Secretary-General António Guterres, marks a historic milestone as Dr. Adeleke becomes the first African to be appointed co-chair of the eminent group of 15 scientists selected from across the world. He is also the first Nigerian to be appointed to a prestigious group.

== Activities ==
Green Growth Africa has initiatives in its climate change programs. These include the Environmental Education Program (EEP), EcoHeroes Initiative, Africa4Nature Health Initiative, and EcoKnowledge Derivatives.

Green Growth Africa started its environmental education program in 2018. The program spanned through other Africa countries, engaging the students on being environmental literacy by providing the information and education resources. The program encouraged the students to initiate programs to challenge climate issues in their communities. The organization has reached out to 3,800 students in Africa on climate change programs.

The EcoHeroes Initiative program focuses on building the skills of African students on Science, Technology, Engineering, Mathematics (STEM), and Arts with particular interest in mitigating the climate changes and environmental hazards under the green framework. It has 3 thematic areas of Sustainable Energy; Sustainable Transportation; and Climate Change. In its 2023/2024 application criterion, it stated that only secondary school students in Africa should apply, with 10 students and a coordinating teacher in each school, and each school choosing any environmental project to work on as well as completing the project between 3 and 4 months. The 2022/2023 had a fund of US$500 Grant for Mentorship & Skill Acquisition which revolved on innovate & implement green growth projects for a more friendly environment.

The Africa4Nature Health Initiative program of the Green Growth Africa, addresses the need for health awareness while promoting the green project for a safe environment. When there is conservation of nature and biodiversity, environmental diseases and pandemic can be tackled, creating safe planet for all.

== Awards ==
In 2022, Green Growth Africa won the Okayama award for Education for Sustainable Development (ESD) and the Pratt & Whitney E-STEM award. That winning made it the first Nigerian organization and the third in Africa to get the award. The Okayama ESD award is given to only two organizations in the world annually.

It won the Pratt & Whitney E-STEM awards. The award was from the North American Association for Environmental Education (NAAEE) that supports environmental STEM education. The program supports environmental literacy. The award offered $10,000 to Green Growth Africa with the notion to reach 10 countries and engage 5,000 students.
