= African University of Science and Technology =

University in Abuja, Nigeria

- Former names: African Institute of Science and Technology
- Type: Private
- Established: 2007; 19 years ago
- Affiliations: Nelson Mandela Institution
- President: Azikwe Peter Onwalu (acting)
- Location: Abuja, Nigeria; 9.001°N 7.422°E
- Campus: Urban
- Website: www.aust.edu.ng

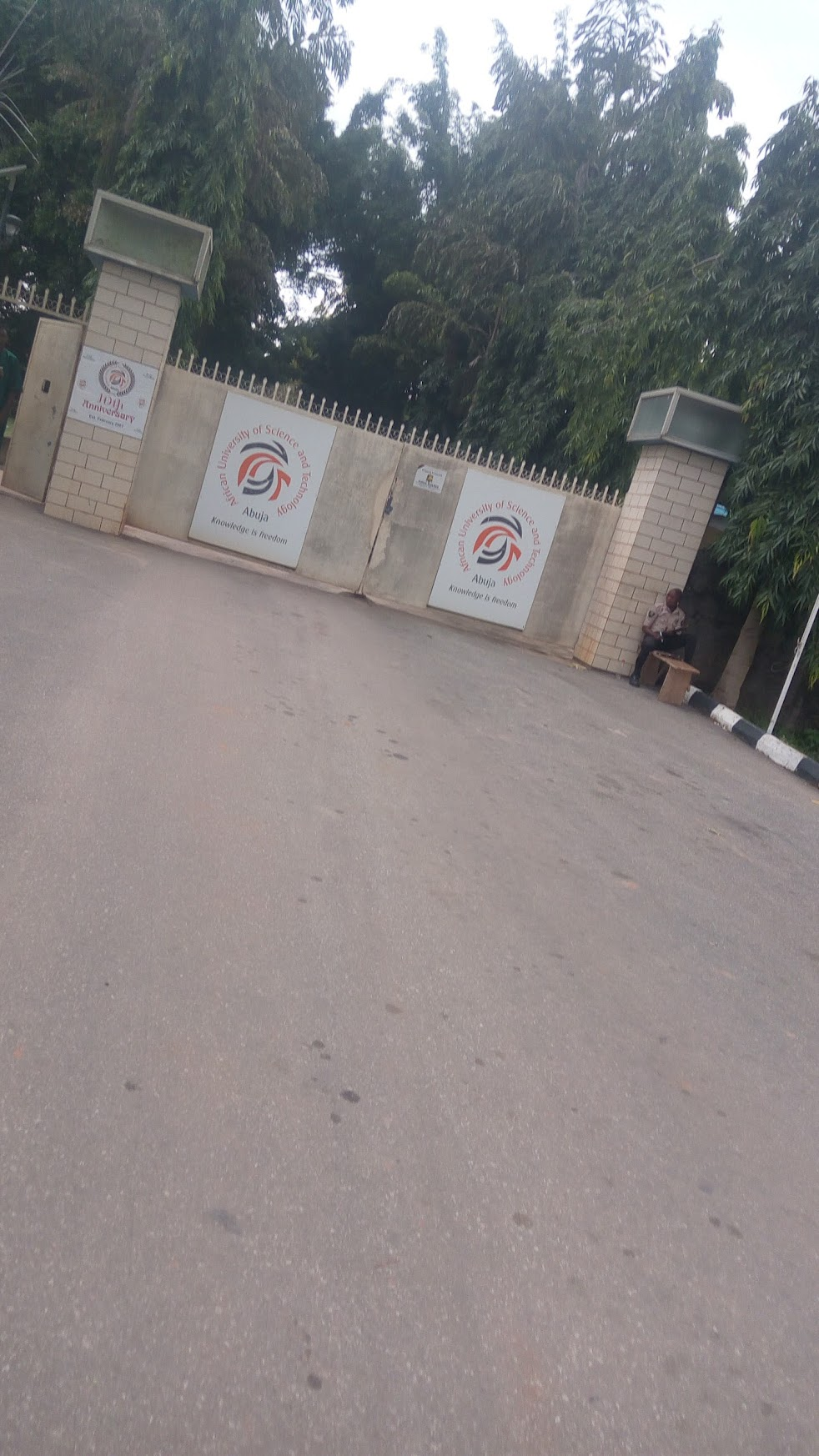
African_University_of_Science_&_Technology,_Abuja

The African University of Science and Technology is an international undergraduate and post-graduate university located in Abuja, Nigeria. It was founded in 2007 as the first part of a pan-African university system concept developed by the Nelson Mandela Institution.

The university offers postgraduate programs in five major disciplinary areas: Computer Science and Management of Information Technology, Material Science and Engineering, Petroleum Engineering, Pure, Applied Mathematics, and Space & Aerospace Sciences, and also a master's degree in Public Administration and Public Policy. Visiting professors include Africans working in the diaspora.

The university was founded as the first campus of the pan-African Nelson Mandela Institution. From its inception, it offered only postgraduate courses. In December 2022, it graduated 145 people from 11 countries, 38 with doctorates.

Winston Wole Soboyejo was president and provost from January 2012 to August 2014. As of December 2022, Azikiwe Peter Onwualu is acting president.
