= Trigmatic =

Ghanaian musician

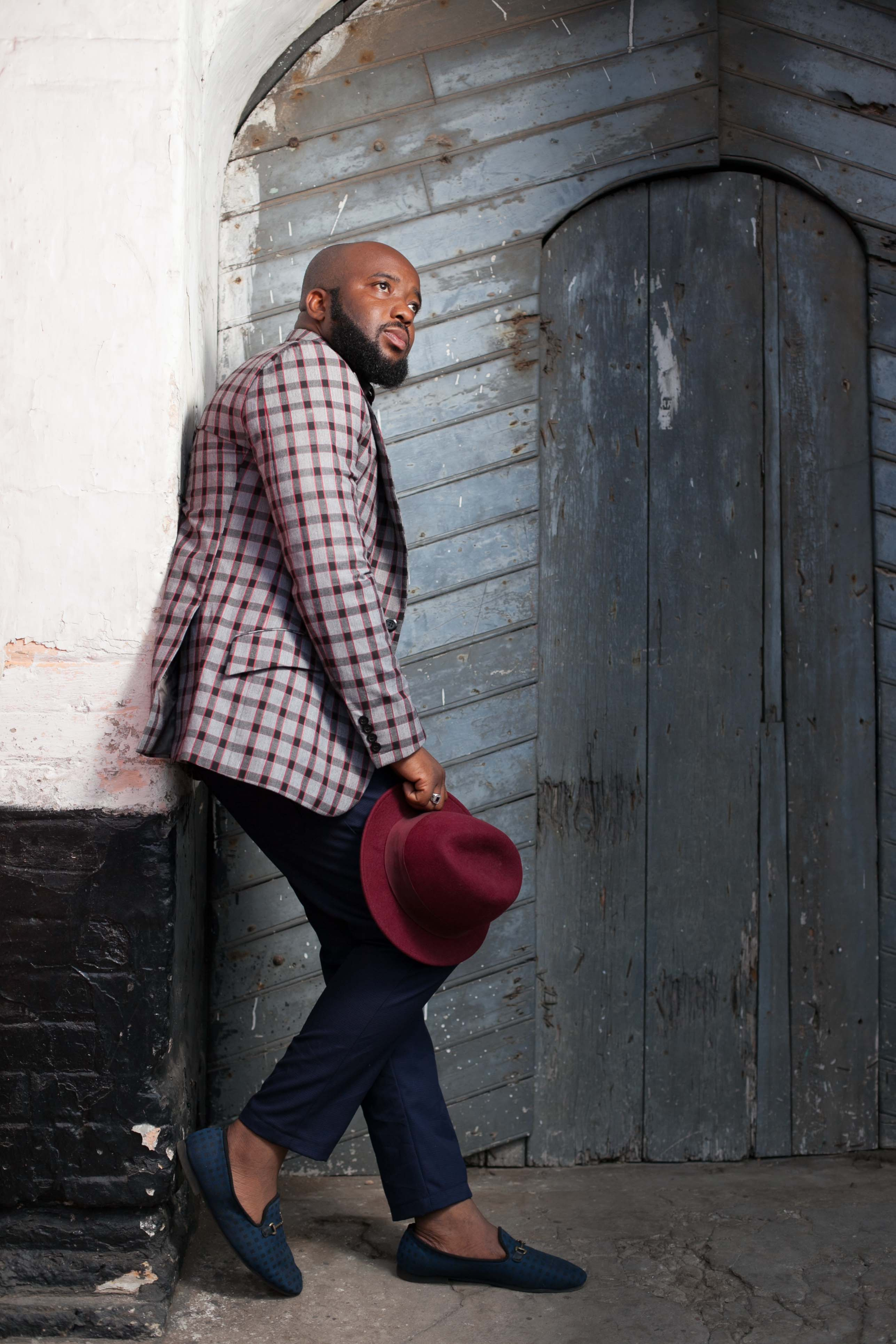

Background information
- Also known as: Trigmatic
- Born: Enoch Nana Yaw Oduro-Adjei; 13 December 1984 (age 41); Accra, Ghana
- Origin: Ghanaian
- Genres: Rap, Hip hop, Hiplife, Afrobeats
- Occupations: Singer, Songwriter, composer, rapper, Radio Personality
- Years active: 2010–present
- Label: Matic multimedia

Enoch Nana Yaw Oduro- Agyei, known by his stage name Trigmatic, is a Ghanaian musician, composer and songwriter from Accra, Ghana. On March 18, 2022, he hosted the debut edition of the Africa Music Business Dialogue at the SIlverbird Cinemas in Accra.

== Early life ==
Enoch Nana Yaw Oduro-Agyei was born on the streets of Flamingo, a suburb of Accra. He started his early education at Homecare Nursery School in Dansoman and later continued at St. Martin de Porres, also in Dansoman. He completed Junior High in 2000 and enrolled in St. Martin de Porres Senior High School where he completed in 2003. He attended St. Martin de Porres Senior High School in Nsawam Adoagyiri.

== Career ==
=== 2000–2007 ===
His musical journey began in high school, where he contributed to all musical events organized by the school. After High School, he enrolled at NIIT in 2005 where he studied network engineering and acquired a diploma in database administration. He later pursued a professional certificate in marketing (CIMUK) from the University of Professional Studies (UPSA) and later a first degree from Central University College. However, his passion for music led him into media and entertainment on a full-time basis. Just around that same period, he became the winner of Vibe FM's lyricist lounge and continued to be a battle rapper.

=== 2007–2011 ===
In 2007, he released a street mixtape called 'Stain on a Cloth'. He continued to discover himself and steadily brought out the Dancehall and Reggae vibe within. He worked at a radio station (Vibe FM) in Accra as a co-host on a Saturday show called 'Young Vibes'.

In 2009, he moved to Yfm, an Accra-based urban radio station where he hosted a Saturday show called 'Y express'. Under new management (Gab Management) in 2010 he released his first main album, Permanent Stains. The album included his hit singles "My Life", "Mefiri Ghana" and "My Jolly". He got seven nominations making him the highest nominee in Ghana Music Awards (2011). He won The Best Rapper of the Year award that year (2011). The Permanent Stains album recorded three nominations in the Gospel Music Awards and four at the 4Syte Music Video Awards. He was most sought after to perform on almost every show held in Ghana. He toured throughout the nation. His nationwide high school tours and other accomplishments got him awarded as Mentor of The Year by Prempeh College. He was awarded the certificate of achievement for his diverse contribution to youth empowerment in Ghana. He was appointed the Head of Hip-Hop for the Musicians Union of Ghana (MUSIGA) in 2011. The same year he established his own label called the Da Trig Entertainment Label, now Matic Multimedia. Under this management, his second album SOUL-u-TIONS was released. Once more he got six nominations at the 2012 Ghana Music Awards. This album also recorded top-ranking hits such as "Light and Darkness" featuring Irene Logan and "Ajeeii" featuring Raquel. It also featured African acts like Kel, Hakym da Dream and Mocheddah. He's recorded with musicians across the length and breadth of this world.

== Philanthropy ==
In 2014 Trigmatic launched his foundation, Matic Foundation which supports many orphanages in Ghana. He is the first to attempt a world record by creating the most extended charity table to feed thousands in his country Ghana. and fosters a child in the orphanage. He is the Food for All Ghana ambassador and championed the feeding of millions in Ghana. In October 2016, on world food day, he will be feeding 5000 Ghanaians at the country's capital. He's currently running a music and educational program for growing kids called Matic Music Club. The club is into music research and therapy. With this club, many kids have benefited as well as teachers. The club is currently in St Martin de Porres sch and About to start at the Top class sch in Dansoman. The club got volunteers from the EU to assist in new teaching skills and music therapy in May 2018 as part of the Global Leaders program in Accra.

== Achievement ==
Award	Year
Best Rapper	2011
Best Dancehall song	2014
Record of the year	2014
Best collaboration	2013
Best Special effect video	2014
Most Influential artiste(hsh)	2014
Best Practice (Dubai)	2015
National Honorary Award	2012
Award for social practice (food4all)	2016
best songwriter of the year GAMA	2020
celebrity entrepreneur of the year	2021
40 under 40 honorary award for music education	2024

Trigmatic won Best Rapper of the Year (2011). 2014 Record of the year- GMA (Ghana Music Awards) 2014 Best dancehall song of the year- bass awards 2014 Best special effect video - 4syte music video awards. 2013 best collaboration of the year VGMA Best Practice Dubai Award in 2012 Honorary Award in Recognition of Outstanding Recognition to Entertainment in Ghana (National Recognition) 2014 Most influential artiste- high school honors

== Discography ==
Studio Albums

- Stains on a cloth mixtape – 2007//
- Permanent Stains – 2010//
- SOUL-u-TIONS – 2011//
- M.A.T.I.C – 2017
- The 8th Element - 2019
- The Pipeano EP - 2021

== Videography ==
Video	Director	Year
My Life	Mantse Aryequaye	2010
My Jolley	Ohenemedia	2011
Ajeii	Ohenemedia	2012
Fatima	OheneMedia	2013
"Sika Nti"	Prince Dovlo	2014
Bellum Angelorum	Riad Sabeh	2014
Not Alone	Pascalaka	2013
Wedding Day	Prince Dovlo	2014
"Gye Nyame"	Prince Dovlo	2016
"Gbedu"	Prince Dovlo	2016
"Joo Hami"	Prince Dovlo	2017
