= Nelson Mandela African Institution of Science and Technology =

Public research institution in Tanzania

Coordinates: 3°23′58″S 36°47′48″E

- Taasisi ya Sayansi na Teknolojia ya Nelson Mandela (Swahili)
- Motto: Academia for Society and Industry
- Type: Public
- Established: 2010; 16 years ago
- Chairman: H.E. Ambassador Maimuna Kibenga Tarishi
- Chancellor: Hon. Omar Issa
- Vice-Chancellor: Prof.Maulilio John Kipanyula
- Academic staff: 71
- Administrative staff: 48
- Students: 135
- Postgraduates: 89
- Doctoral students: 46
- Location: Arusha, Tanzania
- Campus: Urban
- Website: University website

The Nelson Mandela African Institution of Science and Technology (abbreviated as NM-AIST) is a public institution located in Arusha, a city in northern Tanzania. It forms a part of the network of Pan-African Institutes of Science and Technology spread across the continent.

The NM-AIST Arusha is accredited by the Tanzania Commission for Universities (TCU) and is actively being developed as a research-intensive institution focused on postgraduate and postdoctoral studies and research in Science, Engineering, and Technology (SET).

== Academics ==
While emphasizing Science, Engineering, and Technology, the curriculum at NM-AIST Arusha also incorporates significant elements of humanities and business studies. The institution's specializations include life sciences and bio-engineering, which are being cultivated due to the region's rich biodiversity. An important mission of NM-AIST Arusha is to stimulate and advance agricultural production, leading to increased output. Additionally, the institution places a strong emphasis on value addition to natural products, such as agricultural and mineral resources, within Tanzania and the broader Eastern African region. The thematic areas of focus also encompass Energy, ICT, Mining, Environment, and Water.

The PASET Regional Scholarship and Innovation Fund provides grants and scholarships for many students of African higher learning institutions, including NM-AIST.

== Initiatives ==
In a collaboration between the University of Plymouth and NM-AIST, researchers experimented with a portable gamma ray sensor to assess agricultural soil quality in Tanzania. By gathering data about soil health, farmers can make more informed decisions in order to sustainably improve crop yields and climate resilience. NM-AIST researchers also developed KilimoAI (Swahili for "agriculture AI") to help farmers detect crop diseases enough to provide timely interventions for cornerstone crops such as maize and common beans.

Data scientists at NM-AIST developed a machine learning program called BakiShule (Swahili for "stay in school") to improve school attendance and educational outcomes. BakiShule is used by secondary schools to identify risk factors for dropping out of school and recommends strategies for early intervention.

Scientists at NM-AIST developed a mobile phone application which uses artificial intelligence to accurately analyze chest x-rays and detect cases of pneumonia.

== People ==
=== Faculty and Staff ===
Notable members of NM-AIST faculty and staff include:

- Verdiana Masanja, fluid dynamics specialist and the first Tanzanian woman to earn a doctorate in mathematics.
- Neema Mduma, data scientist specializing in machine learning. Dr. Mduma received her doctorate from NM-AIST and is now a senior lecturer at the university. She developed the BakiShule machine learning model.
- Daniel Madulu Shadrack, prolific biomedical researcher pursuing postdoctorate research at NM-AIST.
- Dr. Mashamba Lucas Philipo, plant breeding expert and lecturer at NM-AIST. Dr. Philipo earned his doctorate from NM-AIST's Department of Sustainable Agriculture and Biodiversity Conservation.

=== Alumni ===
- Ruth Lorivi Moirana, winner of 2024 L'Oréal-UNESCO For Women in Science Awards in Sub-Saharan Africa for her research in soil science. Dr. Moirana completed her PhD thesis at NM-AIST.
- Dr. Tusekile Alfredy, hydrologist who earned her MSc and PhD at NM-AIST.

== See also ==
- African University of Science and Technology
- Nelson Mandela Institution
