= Blakk Rasta =

Ghanaian reggae and Kuchoko musician

- Also known as: Blakk Rasta
- Born: Abubakar Ahmed; 2 September 1974 (age 51); Tamale, Ghana
- Genres: Reggae, Kuchoko
- Occupations: Musician, radio presenter
- Years active: 1999–present

Blakk Rasta (born Abubakar Ahmed, 2 September 1974) is a Ghanaian reggae and Kuchoko musician, dub poet, and radio presenter.He is known for developing a fusion style he calls Kuchoko, which blends reggae with indigenous African musical instruments . He currently hosts programs on Accra-based 3FM under Media General.

He gained national attention with the 2008 single "Barack Obama", released during Barack Obama's U.S. presidential campaign.

== Early life and education ==
Blakk Rasta was born Abubakar Ahmed on 2 September 1974 in Tamale, in the Northern Region of Ghana, to Muslim parents. He attended the Kwame Nkrumah University of Science and Technology (KNUST), where he obtained a Bachelor of Science degree in Land Economy. He later pursued postgraduate studies, including an MSc in Oil and Gas Management at the University of Coventry in the United Kingdom.

== Career ==
Blakk Rasta began his professional music career in the early 2000s. He worked as a reggae DJ and hosted several radio shows, including the mid-morning program Taxi Driver on Hitz 103.9 FM.

In 2008, he attracted international attention with the single "Barack Obama", released during Barack Obama’s U.S. presidential campaign.

He later joined Zylofon FM in 2017, where he hosted the same program until 2021. After leaving Zylofon FM, he continued broadcasting on Class FM and on his YouTube platform, Blakk Media Empire.

In 2025, he revived his community initiative Kuchoko in the Ghetto, organizing street activations in Nima and Fadama to promote social responsibility through music and live performances. Blakk Rasta continues to appear in national media discourse, including commentary on cultural and political issues.

=== Musical style ===
Blakk Rasta's musical style, Kuchoko, is a fusion of reggae rhythms with indigenous African sounds, incorporating instruments such as the xylophone, talking drum, kologo, kora, flutes, and various percussive elements.

=== Inspiration ===
He has cited Jamaican dub poets Mutabaruka, DYCR, and Linton Kwesi Johnson as key influences on his writing and performance.

== Public commentary and controversies ==
In 2015, Blakk Rasta appeared before the Privileges Committee of the Parliament of Ghana to apologise for remarks made on his radio programme suggesting that a large number of Members of Parliament smoked cannabis. He later described the comments as unfortunate and issued an unreserved apology to Parliament.

In 2025, he was involved in a widely reported dispute with journalist Oheneba Boamah, during which he criticised Boamah's commentary and questioned journalistic ethics, sparking broader discussions in the media about professionalism

In 2021, he spoke publicly about tensions with dancehall artist Shatta Wale, stating that he deliberately limited airplay of Wale's music due to creative disagreements. Media reports also indicated that Shatta Wale lodged a complaint with police over comments attributed to Blakk Rasta, though outcomes of the matter were not independently confirmed.

In 2023 and 2024, Blakk Rasta publicly criticised rapper Sarkodie over lyrics he considered disrespectful toward women, calling for temporary bans on such music and the withdrawal of ambassadorial roles.

In 2024, he questioned the Ghana Police Service’s decision to publicly burn seized narcotics at Osu Beach, arguing that the method posed environmental and public health concerns.

In late 2024, Blakk Rasta stated that he received threats following a politically charged performance at Nkrumah Fest.

== Honors and awards ==
- 2011 – Voted Radio Reggae Show Host of the Year at the Ghana Radio and TV Awards (RTP Awards).
- 2013 – Nominated for seven BASS Awards, including works featuring Jah Amber.

== Selected Discography ==
=== Singles ===
- "Barack Obama"
- "Mallam Tonga"
- "Bloody Museveni" (featuring Bobi Wine)
- "Piano Logoligi"

=== Albums ===
- Kuchoko Revolution (2016)
- Timbuktu By Road (2019)
- Salaga Soljah (2024)
