= List of city nicknames and slogans in Canada =

This is a list of nicknames and slogans of cities in Canada. Many Canadian cities and communities are known by various aliases, slogans, sobriquets, and other nicknames to the general population at either the local, regional, national, or international scales, often due to marketing campaigns and widespread usage in the media. Some nicknames are officially adopted by municipal governments, tourism boards, or chambers of commerce, while others are unofficial, and some are current while others are antiquated. Some nicknames are positive, while others are derisive, disparaging or derogatory.

City nicknames can help establish a civic identity, promote civic pride, build civic unity, market the community, and attract residents and businesses. They are also believed to have economic value, though their economic value is difficult to measure.

== Cities by province ==
=== Alberta ===
- Brooks
  - "Alberta's Centennial City" — Brooks became a city in 2005, Alberta's centennial year.
- Calgary
  - "Cowtown"
  - "C-Town"
  - "Heart of The New West" — derived from the city's former official slogan
  - "Mohkínstsis" — the traditional Blackfoot name of the Calgary area meaning "elbow," in reference to the river confluence
  - "The Stampede City"
  - "Sandstone City" — named for the boom of buildings built from sandstone following the Great Fire of 1886.
  - YYC – the International Air Transport Association code for Calgary International Airport is used to refer to the city.
- Camrose
  - "The Rose City"
- Edmonton
  - "Amakowsis" or "omahkoyis" — Niitsitapi name for Fort Edmonton meaning 'big lodge'
  - "amiskwacîwâskahikan" — Cree name for Fort Edmonton meaning 'beaver hills house'
  - "The Big E"
  - "Canada's Richest Mixed Farming District" — an unofficial city slogan
  - "City of Champions" — unofficial slogan, appearing on signs popularized by former mayor Laurence Decore's characterization of the community's response to the 1987 Edmonton tornado. Appeared for a period on signs welcoming motorists to the city.
  - "Crossroads of the World" — an unofficial city slogan
  - "Deadmonton" — a disparaging term used by British reporter Robert Philip during the 2001 World Championships in Athletics (although the term had been coined earlier), painting Edmonton as a boring place; the term re-emerged in 2011 due to an increasing amount of homicides.
  - "Stabmonton" — another disparaging term that refers to the increase in violent crimes during the early 2010s. Many of the attacks and homicides were committed with knives and other edged weapons.
  - "E-Town"
  - "Edmonchuck" or "The Chuck" — in reference to Edmonton's large Ukrainian population. (Also spelled "Edmonchuk", reflecting traditional romanization.)
  - "Festival City" or "Canada's Festival City" — an unofficial city slogan referring to the many festivals held in Edmonton year-round.
  - "Gateway to the North" — an unofficial city slogan
  - "Heart of Canada's Great North West" — an unofficial city slogan
  - "Official Host City of the Turn of the Century" — tentative city slogan, displayed on telephone book covers in the 1980s, but quickly abandoned after widespread ridicule.
  - "The Oil Capital of Canada" — Edmonton's only official slogan adopted by city council, which dates back to 1947
  - "Redmonton" — in reference to the city being the most hospitable territory for left-wing political parties in the province. Originally popularized after the 1986 provincial election.
  - "River City" — an unofficial nickname, referencing the North Saskatchewan River which runs through Edmonton
  - "Smart City" — an unofficial city slogan
  - "ti oda" — Nakota Sioux name for Fort Edmonton meaning 'many houses'
  - "Top of the World" — an unofficial city slogan
  - "Volunteer Capital of Canada" — an unofficial city slogan
  - "YEG" — an unofficial city slogan (also the IATA airport code of Edmonton International Airport)
- Fort McMurray
  - "Fort Mac"
  - "Fort MacMoney" or "Fort McMoney" — in reference to supposedly high salaries in oil and related industries.
  - "Fort McMordor" — in reference to how the city's tar sands industry supposedly evoke images of Mordor from The Lord of the Rings films.
  - "St. John's North" — in reference to the large number of Newfoundlanders working in the city's oil industry
- Fox Creek
  - "Fox Vegas"
- Grande Prairie
  - "Swan City" — after Grande Prairie received its municipal charter in 1958, it was declared the "Home of the Trumpeter Swan."
- Lloydminster
  - "Border City" or "Canada's Border City" — in reference to the city being divided by the Alberta/Saskatchewan border
  - "Heavy Oil Capital of Canada"
  - "Lloyd"
- Lethbridge
  - "Methbridge"
  - "The Windy City"
- Medicine Hat
  - "The City with All Hell for a Basement" — derived from a quote by Rudyard Kipling upon visiting Medicine Hat, referring to the city's natural gas reserves.
  - "The City with Energy"
  - "The Gas City"
  - "The Hat"
  - "An Oasis on the Prairies"
  - "Saamis" — a Blackfoot word for 'medicine man's hat', from which Medicine Hat's name is derived
- Red Deer
  - "Dead Rear" — a spoonerism
- Stettler
  - "The Heart of Alberta"
- Whitecourt
  - "Snowmobile Capital of Alberta"

=== British Columbia ===
- Abbotsford
  - "Berry Capital of Canada"
  - "City in the Country"
  - "Raspberry Capital of Canada" — although the neighbourhood of Clearbrook specifically is known for its raspberries
- Campbell River
  - "Salmon Capital of the World" (nearby Port Alberni also claims this title)
- Dawson Creek
  - "The Mile Zero City" — named for the city being the southern terminus of the Alaska Highway
- Fort St. John
  - "The Energetic City"
- Kamloops
  - "The Tournament Capital"
- Kelowna
  - "Orchard City" — named for the prevalent fruit production of the Okanagan Valley.
  - "The Four Seasons Playground", named for being worldwide year-round tourist destination
- Maple Ridge
  - "Horse Capital of British Columbia" (nearby Langley also claims this title)
- Nanaimo
  - "Harbour City"
  - "Hub City"
- Nelson
  - "Queen City of the Kootenays"
- New Westminster
  - "New West"
  - "Royal City"
- Oliver
  - "Wine Capital of Canada"
- Penticton
  - "The Peach City"
- Port Alberni
  - "Salmon Capital of the World" (nearby Campbell River also claims this title)
- Port Coquitlam
  - "PoCo"
- Powell River
  - "Pearl of the Sunshine Coast"
- Surrey
  - "City of Parks"
- Trail
  - "Home of Champions"
  - "Silver City"
- Vancouver
- Victoria
  - "The Garden City"
  - "City of Newly Weds and Nearly Deads" — with larger numbers of seniors or young families as the two major demographics
  - "Chicktoria"

=== Manitoba ===
- Brandon
  - "Wheat City"
- Churchill
  - "Polar Bear Capital of the World" — used as a tourist attraction slogan due to the population of polar bears
- Steinbach
  - "Automobile City"
- Thompson
  - "The Centennial City" — having been incorporated as a town in 1967, Canada's Centennial Anniversary.
  - "Hub of the North" or "Hub City"
  - "Nickel City"
- Winnipeg
  - "Chicago of the North" — in reference to the famously strong winds in both cities and being major transportation hubs of the time.
  - "Gateway to the West"
  - "Murderpeg" or "Murder Capital of Canada" — due to Winnipeg's murder rate
  - "Negativipeg" — labelled by Burton Cummings after he was assaulted at a 7-Eleven
  - "The Peg"
  - "Slurpee Capital of the World" — named by 7-Eleven, claiming Winnipeg to be the world leader of Slurpee sales for over 20 years in a row.
  - "Winnerpeg" —often used when the city's sports teams such as the Winnipeg Blue Bombers and Winnipeg Jets win
  - "Winterpeg" — due to Winnipeg's very long and cold winters
  - "The Wholesale City"

=== New Brunswick ===
- Fredericton
  - "Celestial City"
  - "City of Stately Elms"
  - "Freddy Beach"
- Moncton
  - "Hub City"
- Saint John
  - "Canada's Irish City" — due to its role as a destination for Irish immigrants during the Great Irish Famine
  - "Canada's Original City" — referring to Saint John being the first incorporated city in Canada
  - "Loyalist City" — due to its role as a destination for Loyalists, American British supporters following the American Revolution.
  - "Port City" — due to its role in the shipbuilding industry in the 19th century
  - "Lost City" — referring to the state-sponsored demolition of swaths of urban neighbourhoods in the centre of the city to make way for thoroughfares and highway interchange projects in the mid-20th century. To this day, the areas impacted have not recovered.

=== Newfoundland and Labrador ===
- Gander
  - "Crossroads of the World"
- St. John's
  - "City of Legends"
  - "Newfiejohn" — a nickname given by American servicemen in World War II
  - "Town" — as St. John's is the only major urban area in Newfoundland, going across the island "to town" means heading to St. John's.
- Twillingate
  - "The Iceberg Capital of the World"

=== Nova Scotia ===
- Amherst
  - "Busy Amherst" — a historical nickname coined during the early 20th century due to Amherst's industrial significance in the Maritime Provinces at that time.
- Antigonish
  - "The 'Nish"
  - "Antigonowhere"
- Berwick
  - "Apple Capital of Nova Scotia" — the town has a rich history of apple cultivation
- Dartmouth
  - "City of Lakes" — from the high number of lakes dotted around the city
  - "The Darkside"
- Digby
  - "Scallop Capital of the World" — the town is famous for its large fleet of scallop fishing boats
- Halifax
  - "City of Trees"
  - "Haligonia"
- New Glasgow
  - "NG"
- Oxford
  - "Blueberry Capital of Canada" — due to being located in the centre of Nova Scotia's blueberry-growing Cumberland County
- Pictou
  - "The Birthplace of New Scotland" — the town was the landing place of the ship Hector, which carried some of the first Scottish immigrants to North America
- Truro
  - "The Hub of Nova Scotia" or "Hubtown" — due to its geographical location within the province and its significance in its history

=== Ontario ===
- Bala
  - "The Cranberry Capital of Ontario"
- Brampton
  - "Bramladesh" — a nickname applied to Bramalea in reference to the large South Asian community, particularly those from Bangladesh
  - "Browntown" — another nickname in reference to the large South Asian community
  - "Flower City"
  - "B-Town" — a pop-culture reference, commonly used by locals.
- Brantford
  - "Bell City"
  - "The Telephone City"
- Chatham
  - "The Maple City"
  - "The Classic Car Capital of Canada"
- Cambridge
  - "The Creative Capital of Canada" (Region of Waterloo)
- Georgina
  - "Ice Fishing Capital of North America"
- Guelph
  - "The Royal City"
- Hamilton
  - "Ambitious City" — an early nickname that was originally meant to be patronising
  - "The Hammer"
  - "Steeltown"
  - "Tony Creek", for the Stoney Creek area, due to the significant Italian-Canadian population
- Kingston
  - "The Limestone City" — in reference to the large number of historical buildings constructed from local limestone.
  - "Ktown" — a shortening of the city's name used frequently by local businesses and radio hosts.
- Kitchener
  - "The Creative Capital of Canada" (Region of Waterloo)
  - "K-town" (similar to "Ktown" for Kingston, ON) — a shortening of its name used by media, businesses and citizens.
  - "K-Dub" — often used to collectively refer to the cities of Kitchener and Waterloo.
- Leamington
  - "The Tomato Capital of Canada"
- London
  - "The Forest City"
- Markham
  - "Canada's High-Tech Capital"
- Mississauga
  - "'Sauga"
- Niagara Falls
  - "Honeymoon Capital of the World"
- North Bay
  - "Gateway to the North" (Edmonton, AB, also claims this title)
  - "Gateway City"
  - "Smoothie Capital of the World"
  - "The Bay"
- Oshawa
  - "Canada's Motor City"
  - "The 'Shwa"
- Ottawa
  - "Bytown" — the city's official name prior to 1855; still used as a nickname in the media
  - "The 613" or "The 343" — the primary area codes for eastern Ontario, including Ottawa.
  - "OTT"
  - "YOW" — the IATA airport code for the Ottawa Macdonald–Cartier International Airport.
  - "Capital City"
  - "The Government City"
  - "O-Town"
  - "The City that Fun Forgot" — used sarcastically by residents of Ottawa
- Orillia
  - "The Sunshine City"
- Owen Sound
  - "Chicago North"
  - "Corkscrew City"
  - "Little Liverpool"
  - "The Scenic City"
- Peterborough
  - "Electric City"
- Sarnia
  - "Chemical Valley"
  - "Imperial City"
  - "Tunnel Town"
- Sault Ste. Marie
  - "The Soo"
- St. Catharines
  - "St. Kitts"
  - "The Garden City"
- St. Thomas
  - "Railway City"
  - "Railway Capital of Canada"
- Stratford
  - "Festival City"
  - "The Classic City"
- Sudbury
  - "Nickel Capital"
  - "Nickel City"
  - "City of Lakes"
- Thunder Bay
  - "Canada's Gateway to the West" (Winnipeg, MB, also claims this title)
  - "Lakehead"
  - "T-Bay"
- Toronto
  - "Queen City"
  - "Hogtown"
  - "T.O." — derived from Toronto, Ontario
  - "T-Dot"
  - "The Big Smoke"
  - "Toronto the Good" from its history as a bastion of 19th century Victorian morality and coined by mayor William Holmes Howland An 1898 book by C.S. Clark was titled Of Toronto the Good. A Social Study. The Queen City of Canada As It Is. The book is a facsimile of an 1898 edition. Today sometimes used ironically to imply a less-than-great or less-than-moral status.
  - "The 6ix" — popularized by rapper Drake, a Toronto native who based the nickname on the shared digits of the 416 and 647 telephone area codes and/or referring to the six districts that make up the present city of Toronto. Created by Jimmy Prime, member of Toronto hip-hop group, Prime Boys.
    - Scarborough (part of Toronto since 1998)
      - "Scarbs" — a diminutive nickname word for Scarborough, oftentimes the last letter (s) is spelt with a zed.
      - "Scarberia" — a derogatory nickname based on Scarborough's reputation as a barren, faraway land to the east of Toronto
      - "Scarlem" — a derogatory nickname which associates Scarborough with the inner-city crime of Harlem, New York
- Waterloo
  - "The Creative Capital of Canada" (Region of Waterloo)
  - "The 'Loo"
  - "K-Dub" — often used to collectively refer to the cities of Waterloo and Kitchener.
- Welland
  - "The Rose City"
- Windsor
  - "Rose City"
  - "Automotive Capital of Canada"

=== Prince Edward Island ===
- Charlottetown
  - "Birthplace of Confederation" — the historic Charlottetown Conference, a conference held between the Fathers of Confederation, was key to the Confederation of Canada.

=== Quebec ===
- Gatineau
  - "French Ottawa" – Gatineau is across the river from Ottawa, but in the province of Quebec. Functionally the only major difference between the cities is the primary language spoken.
  - "Little Chicago" – historical nickname from the prohibition-era and continued through modern times, Hull/Gatineau is known for having a vibrant bar scene and a lower drinking age than in Ontario, leading to hundreds of Ottawa teenagers crossing into Hull to drink legally every night.
- Montreal
  - "Québec's Metropolis" (French: La Métropole du Québec)
  - "The City of Saints"
  - "La métropole" (French for 'The Metropolis')
  - "La ville aux cent clochers" (French for 'The City of a Hundred Steeples')
  - "Sin City" — a historical nickname from the prohibition-era
  - "The City of Festivals"
  - "The Real City"
- Quebec City
  - "La Vieille Capitale"
- Sherbrooke
  - "Queen of the Eastern Townships"
- Saints-Anges
  - "Terre de rêves" (French for 'The Land of Dreams')

=== Saskatchewan ===
- Estevan
  - "Depressetevan"
  - "The Sunshine Capital of Canada"
- Kelvington
  - "Canada's Hockey Factory"
- Maryfield
  - "The M.F."
- Moose Jaw
  - "Band City"
  - "The Jaw"
  - "The Friendly City"
- Pilot Butte
  - "The Sand Capital of Canada"
- Prince Albert
  - "P.A."
- Regina
  - "The Queen City"
  - "Pile o' Bones"
  - "The City That Rhymes With Fun"
- Saskatoon
  - "The Bridge City"
  - "Hub City"
  - "Paris of the Prairies"
  - "POW City" — for its resources in potash, oil and wheat
  - "Saskabush"
  - "Stoon"
  - "Toontown"
- Swift Current
  - "Speedy Creek"
- Tisdale
  - "Land of Rape and Honey" — for the rapeseed grown in the area and the world's largest honey bee statue. The municipal government has since abandoned the slogan due to misinterpretations.

== Cities by territory ==
=== Northwest Territories ===
- Aklavik
  - "The town that wouldn't die."
- Fort Liard
  - "Tropics of the North"
- Fort Resolution
  - "Fort Res"
  - "Resolution"
- Fort Smith
  - "Garden Capital of the North"
- Hay River
  - "Hub of the North"
  - "Whitefish Capital"
- Norman Wells
  - "The Wells"
- Tuktoyaktuk
  - "Tuk"
- Yellowknife
  - "YK"
  - "The Rock" — a nickname for the old or original town

=== Nunavut ===
- Pangnirtung
  - "Switzerland of the Arctic"

=== Yukon ===
- Dawson City
  - "Paris of the North"
- Whitehorse
  - "The Wilderness City"

== See also ==
- List of provincial and territorial nicknames in Canada
- List of cities in Canada
- List of Canadian provinces' largest cities
- List of city nicknames in the United States
- Lists of nicknames – nickname list articles on Wikipedia
