= Peace of Mind (Jay Whiss album) =

Studio album by Jay Whiss
- Released: March 3, 2020
- Recorded: 2019–2020
- Genre: Canadian hip hop
- Length: 33:03
- Label: Universal Music Canada
- Producer: Cubeatz; Murda Beatz; Damian Birsey

Jay Whiss chronology
Koba World (2018)	Peace of Mind (2020)

Singles from Peace of Mind
- 1. "Dark Cloud" Released: June 5, 2019; 2. "Valet" Released: December 3, 2019; 3. "Lay Low" Released: February 6, 2020; 4. "Mind in a Maze" Released: March 3, 2020

Professional ratings
Review scores
Source	Rating
Exclaim!	8/10
HNHH	5/5 stars

Peace of Mind is the debut studio album by Canadian rapper Jay Whiss released via Universal Music Canada. After released a 3 track EP which contained the single "Every Night" which features vocals from Jimmy Prime and Safe and "Dark Cloud" it was said to be served as a prequel to this album. The PE included the single "Dark Cloud" which was also confirmed to be the first single on the album. Peace of Mind was released on March 3, 2020, and was also supported by the singles "Valet" featuring Puffy L'z, "Lay Low" featuring Donnie and "Mind in a Maze". The album received an 8/10 rating by Exclaim!.

== Background ==
During the month of December in 2019, Whiss announced that his debut album Peace of Mind is slated for a release in early 2020 and will be titled Peace of Mind. The lead single of the album "Valet" was released on December 3, 2020, and featured vocals from Puffy L'z and was produced by Murda Beatz. The album was also supported by another Murda Beatz produced track titled "Lay Low" featured Donnie was released and on February 6, 2020. The album was officially released on March 3, 2020, and also saw a vocal appearance from Jimmy Prime on the song "Left Me For Dead". Whiss also released visuals for the song "Mind in a Maze" on the same day of the album release. A song he describes as his favorite song ever made, going on to say that "It's not just a song; it's literally me."

== Critical reception ==
Peace of Mind was met with generally positive reviews. The album received an 8/10 rating by Kyle Mullin of Exclaim!, who outlined Whiss as an artist who balances such "hood hedonism with genuinely thoughtful bars that make for a well-rounded listen" and a powerful solo debut from the artist. HotNewHipHop's Aron A., described Peace Of Mind as a raw and unfiltered portrayal of Jay Whiss as a person and the city that raised him. Giving the album a 5 star rating.

== Track listing ==
Peace of Mind track listing
No.	Title	Writer(s)	Producer(s)	Length
1.	"Don't Change on Me"	Kevin Gomringer; Tim Gomringer; Shane Lindstrom; Jordan Whiston	Cubeatz; Murda Beatz	03:47
2.	"Dark Cloud"	George Allison; Sebastian Lopez; Whiston	1Mind	03:22
3.	"Please"	Damian Birdsey; Amir Jammalieh; Lindstrom; Whiston	Damian Birdsey; Amir Jamm; Murda Beatz	04:16
4.	"Valet" (featuring Puffy L'z)	K. Gomringer; T. Gomringer; Lindstrom; Habib Mohamed; Whiston	Cubeatz; Murda Beatz	03:00
5.	"Left Me for Dead" (featuring Jimmy Prime)	Damian Birdsey; Gordon Mathieu Phillips; Tony Son; Whiston	Damian Birsey; Richie Souf	03:08
6.	"Lay Low" (featuring Donnie)	Birdsey; Donovan Smyth-Todd; Son; Whiston	Damian Birdsey; Richie Souf	02:59
7.	"Back Track"	Andrew Franklin; Lindstrom; Whiston	Pro Logic; Murda Beatz	03:07
8.	"Know Right"	Amir Jammalieh; Jelani Mack; Whiston	Amir Jamm; Lani Christ	02:33
9.	"Either Way"	Birdsey; Jammalieh; Whiston	Damian Birsey; Amir Jamm	03:04
10.	"Mind in a Maze"	Ahmed Ainab; Jammalieh; Whiston	Damian Birsey; Amir Jamm; ticks	03:43

== Personnel ==
Credits for Peace of Mind adapted from AllMusic.

- Jay Whiss – Primary artist, composer
- Donnie – Featured artist, composer
- Puffy L'z – Featured artist, composer
- Jimmy Prime – Featured artist, composer
- 1Mind – Producer
- Chris Athens – Mastering engineer
- Murda Beatz – Producer
- Damian Birdsey – Engineer, producer
- Lani Christ – Producer
- Cubeatz – Producer
- Amir Jammalieh – Engineer, mastering engineer, mixing, producer
- Pro Logic – Engineer, producer
- Richie Souf – Producer
