= Treadwell =

Treadwell may refer to:

- Treadwell (name), includes a list of people with the name
- Treadwell (Droid), fictional character in Star Wars
- Treadwell gold mine, southeast of Juneau, Alaska
- Treadwell, Georgia, an unincorporated community
- Treadwell, New York, hamlet located within the town of Franklin in Delaware County
- Treadwell, Ontario
- Mount Treadwell, Marie Byrd Land, Antarctica
- Treadwell & Martin, former London architect firm
- Treadwell's Bookshop, a London bookshop specialising in esoteric and occult works.

== See also ==
- Tredwell, a variant spelling of this name
