= Jay Whiss =

Canadian rapper (1992–2025)

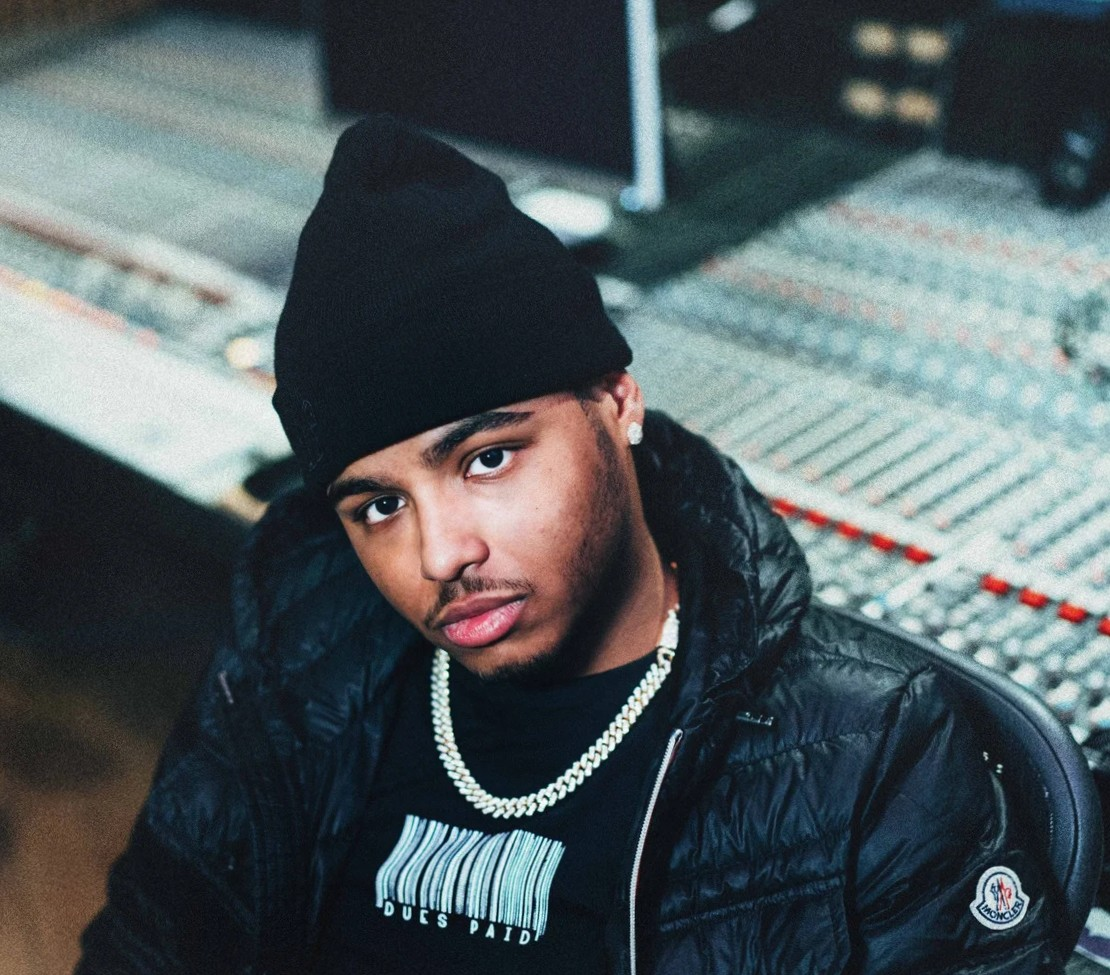
- Jay Whiss in 2018

Background information
- Born: Jordan Whiston; September 24, 1992; Toronto, Ontario, Canada
- Origin: Toronto, Ontario, Canada
- Died: March 22, 2025 (aged 32) Alberta, CA
- Genre: Hip-hop
- Years active: 2011–2025
- Label: Universal
- Member of: Prime Boys; Full Circle
- Website: web.archive.org/web/20220124142603/http://www.jaywhiss.com/

Jordan Whiston (September 24, 1992 – March 22, 2025), better known by his stage name Jay Whiss, was a Canadian rapper and songwriter from Toronto, Ontario. He first gained international attention after the release of the single "Watch This", which appeared on OVO Sound Radio in late 2015. Jay Whiss also appeared on the Noisey documentary 6IX RISING (2017), which showcased hip hop culture in Canada. He is one-third of the hip hop collective Prime Boys, alongside Jimmy Prime and Donnie. Prime Boys released their debut studio album Koba World on July 27, 2018; the album received a 9/10 score by Exclaim!. Jay Whiss was also featured in the short film Remember Me, Toronto (2019) by Mustafa the Poet.

He embarked on his solo venture in 2019 with the release of his EP Dark Clouds, after being signed to Universal Music Canada. The 3-track EP, which served as a prequel to his upcoming album, contained the single "Every Night", featuring vocals from Jimmy Prime and Safe, and "Dark Cloud", which was also confirmed to be the first single from the upcoming album. Jay's debut studio album Peace of Mind was released on March 3, 2020. The album was supported by the singles "Valet", featuring Puffy L'z, "Lay Low", featuring Donnie, and "Mind in a Maze". It received an 8/10 rating by Exclaim!

Jay Whiss died in March 2025 from brain cancer.

== Life and career ==
=== Early life: 1992–2010 ===
We were just chilling one day at 176 and he asked me to go to the studio. I booked us a session at Wellesley Sounds and there were probably 20 of us who walked over there. We had the session and everything with Donnie just started from there.

— Jay Whiss on his first bonds with Prime Boys associate Donnie.

Jay Whiss was born in 1992 to an Irish mother and Vincentian father. An only child, he was raised by his single mother who moved to St. Lawrence, Toronto when he was a week old. He has stated that he lived in a number of different places whilst growing up. Jay Whiss claimed he had a typical childhood, playing hockey and soccer, and in 2006, at the age of 11, he moved to the opposite side of the city but still hung around in the Esplanade area of Toronto. He attended numerous high schools but eventually dropped out after being 4.5 credits short of graduating. Jay Whiss mentioned that he had no musical influence in his family, but his mother, who was a part-time employee at HMV, used to bring numerous musical CDs from different genres home, which drew him to like music. He recalled his father saying to him: "you know the lyrics to every song but don't do your homework" in regards to his childhood. His earliest musical influences include Ludacris, Missy Elliott, The Notorious B.I.G., and Jay Z. He has also noted Canadian artists Solitair, Kardinal Offishall, and Point Blank amongst his influences.

=== Career beginnings: 2011–2015 ===
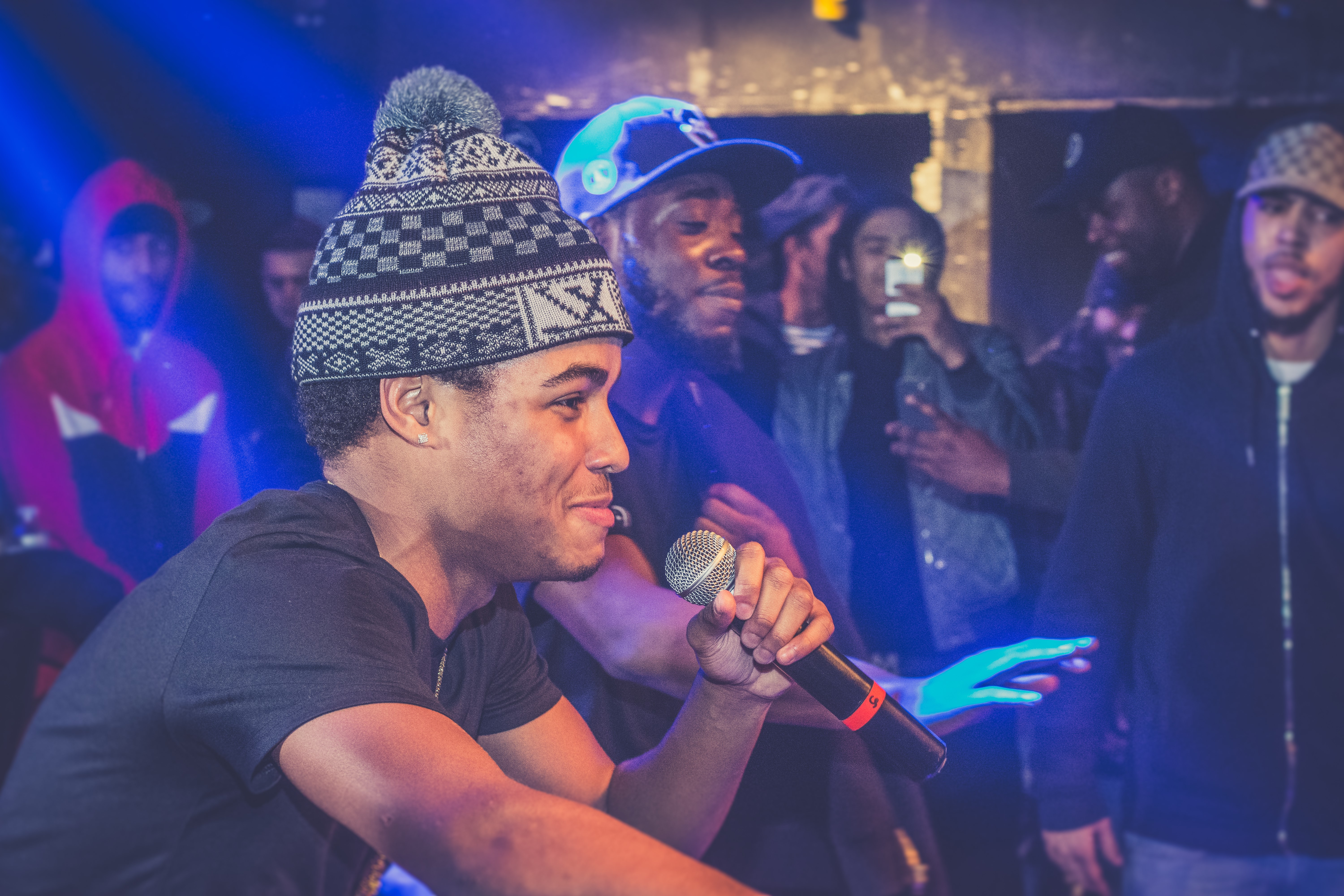
Jay Whiss performing in 2015

Jay Whiss decided to start rapping in the summer of 2010 at the age of 17, as a way to express himself. He released his first single "Chasing a Dream" on January 3, 2011, at the age of 18 via WorldStarHipHop, followed by the single "2011 Til Infinity" on February 6 of the same year. Both singles were shot with long-time Prime Boys affiliate and music video director Tristan Prime but received little recognition. Alongside Prime Boys, Jay Whiss and his entourage first attracted local attention in St. Lawrence in 2013 and gained national attraction with the single "I Heard", produced by Eric Dingus and released on November 17, 2014. Prime Boys' most prominent member at this time, Jimmy Prime, gained the group considerable attention for coining the nickname "The Six" for Toronto, a term that has been broadly accepted by rappers such as Drake. Jimmy Prime released his mixtape Block Boy in July 2015, featuring Jay Whiss on the track "Best One". The release also prompted a photoshoot by Vice in the following month, which gained the group some notice on a national scale. Jay Whiss came to the attention of record label manager Oliver El-Khatib, who added Jay Whiss' single "Imagine Us" to Episode 5 of OVO Sound Radio in September 2015. In November 2015, Jay Whiss released the single "Watch This", produced by Lani Christ, and followed it up with a music video directed by Tristan Prime. The video featured cameos from his crew members Jimmy Prime, Donnie, and Esplanade associate Safe. He then went on to release the track "Need it all", which featured Jimmy Prime and was produced by Eric Dingus. Dingus was later signed by Drake, and added the song to Episode 42 Of OVO Sound Radio.

=== Koba World: 2016–2018 ===
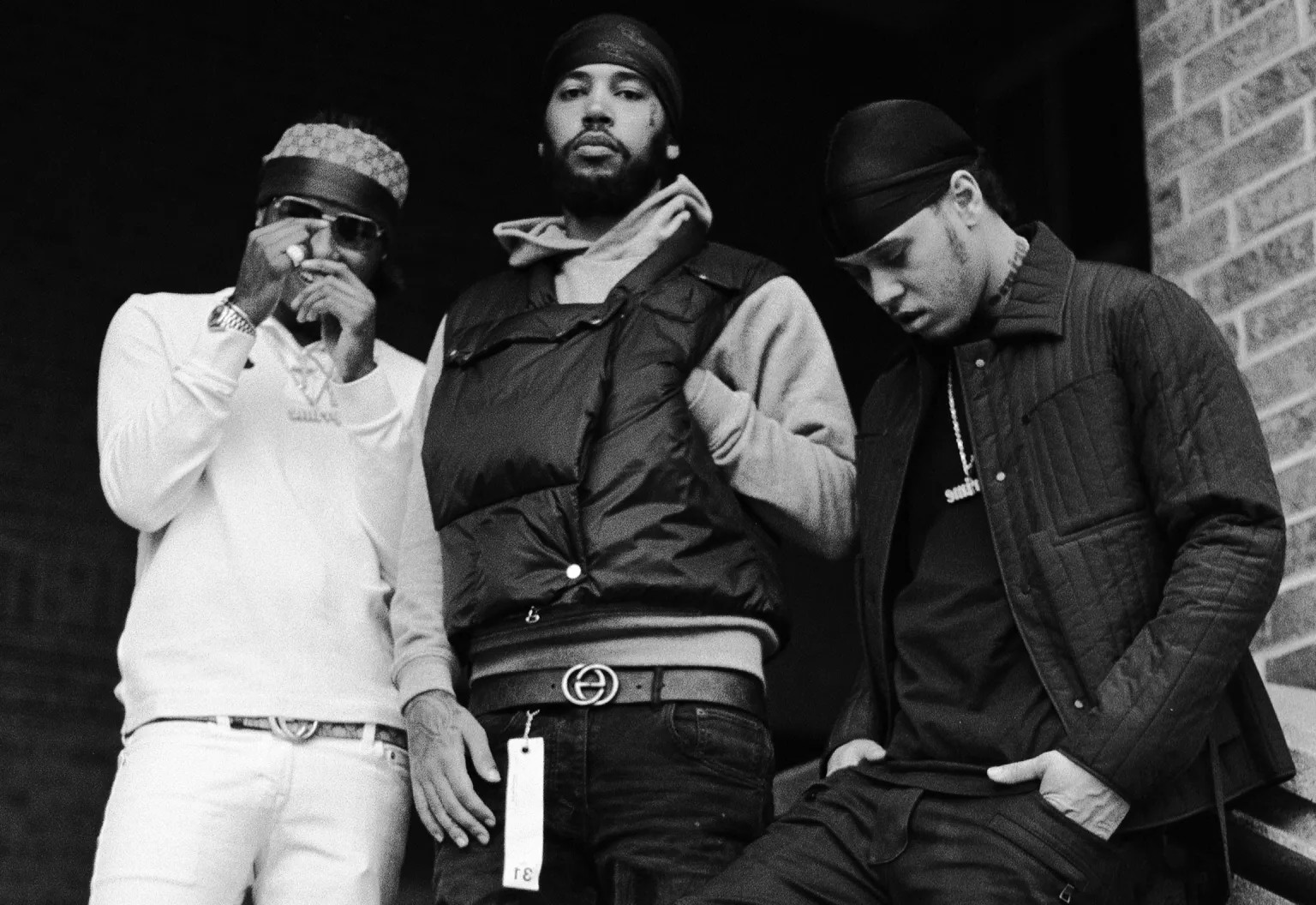
Prime Boys in 2017. L–R: Jay Whiss, Jimmy Prime, Donnie

In early 2016, Halal Gang member and Esplanade native Safe drew the attention of Drake. Since gaining the approval stamp from Drake himself already in the previous year, Jay Whiss remained relatively quiet in terms of making music. However, a few months later, Jay Whiss released the single "Driven", which featured Safe and was produced by 1mind. The song "Full Circle", with Donnie, Puffy L'z, Smoke Dawg, Safe, and Jimmy Prime, showcased a new supergroup forming in Toronto with all 3 Prime Boys and 3 of the Halal Gang members. The song was released in September 2016 and quickly went viral, amassing over a million views in a year. The group were labelled the "all-star team" of Toronto street rap. The song was another of Jay Whiss's that made it on OVO Sound Radio, this time on Episode 34. Jay Whiss and the Prime Boys also became good friends with Toronto producer Murda Beatz in 2016, and the latter provided production for the artists' work. Murda Beatz released his mixtape Keep God First on December 10, 2016, featuring Jay Whiss on the track "Brown Money".

Jay Whiss officially made his debut feature on Spotify's Northern Bars playlist with the single "Welcome to the Life", which was released in May 2017 and produced by Murda Beatz. The Northern Bars Playlist is part of the RapCaviar series, which focuses on Canadian Hip Hop. Toronto's uTOpia music festival was held in June 2017 and showcase a new generation of artists in the General Toronto Area. Jimmy Prime, who was one of the main performers at the festival, brought out Jay Whiss and Donnie, who performed alongside Smoke Dawg, Puffy L'z, and Mo-G. The event was rated 7 by Exclaim!, who described Prime Boys and Halal Gang's performances as playing off of each other's energy. Jay Whiss also appeared in the Noisey documentary 6IX RISING, which looks into the rising hip-hop scene of Toronto after the blockbuster success of Drake and The Weeknd. The film premiered to a limited audience at Hot Docs Ted Rogers Cinema on November 16, 2017.

In January 2018, Jay Whiss announced that he and the Prime Boys were working on their debut collaboration album, due to be released sometime in the summer of 2018, initially titled Prime Forever. The following month, the group released the single "Tinted", produced by Murda Beatz, marking it as the lead single of the upcoming album. The music video for the single was directed by Elliot Clancy Osberg and saw the group ride ATVs in the tundra on a frozen lake. The song went on to feature on Northern Bars as well as giving Prime Boys the chance to further their careers and promote Canada's expanding hip-hop market. Clash conducted an interview on the Toronto Music Scene and published an article which portrays Toronto's rap underground on March 12, 2018. In the interview, Jay Whiss described Toronto as a city that isn't a mystery anymore and said that he wants his music to transcend everywhere. Full Circle affiliate Smoke Dawg and Prime Boys assistant manager Koba Prime were reportedly shot and killed on June 30, 2018, in an incident involving multiple victims. The death of Koba Prime influenced the name change of Prime Boys' upcoming album to Koba World as a tribute. Jay Whiss went on to say that "names never die, and their names always live on" in regards to the album name change. The album was officially released on July 27, 2018, and was supported by the singles "Hold Me Down" and "Sopranos". Jay Whiss also participated in distributing exclusive Prime Boys merchandise on August 10, 2018, in a pop-up shop near St. Lawrence Market. Smoke Dawg's posthumous album Struggle Before Glory was released on November 29, 2018. Jay Whiss made an appearance on the song "These Games", alongside Safe. The song was noted for glimpsing into a lighthearted future over a bouncy dance beat.

=== Peace of Mind: 2019–2022 ===
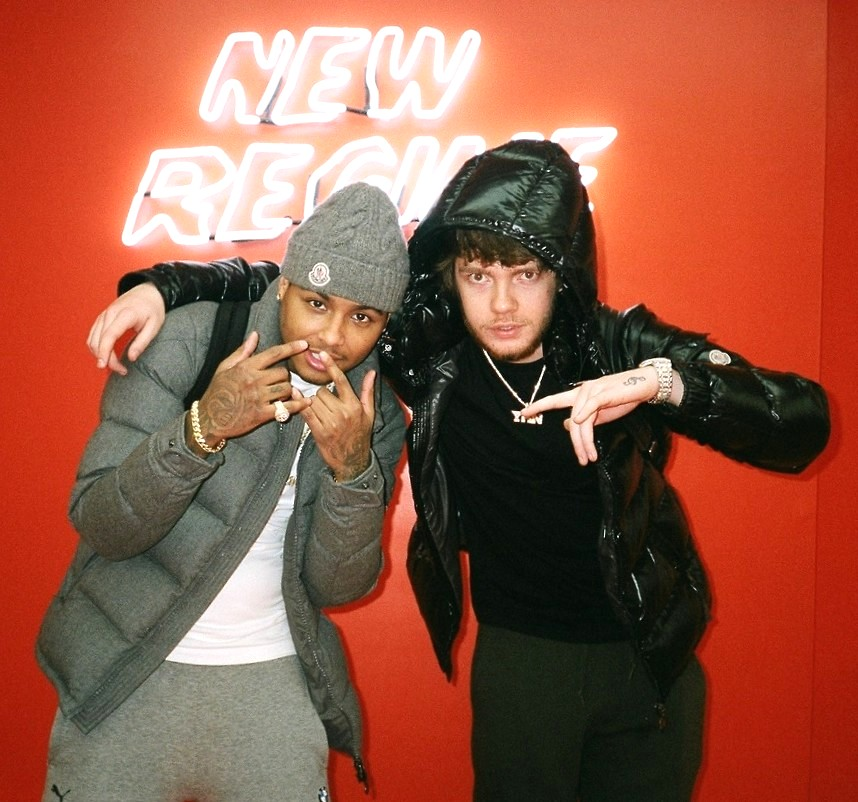
Jay Whiss (left) with Murda Beatz in 2021

Jay Whiss was one of the artists who made the list of XXL's Top 15 Toronto rappers of 2019. In January 2019, he signed a deal with Universal Music Canada. Mustafa the Poet released the short film Remember Me, Toronto, on March 17, 2019. The short film came about after the death of Smoke Dawg and tackles the subject of gun violence in Toronto. It features numerous Toronto rappers, including Jay Whiss, discussing how they want to be remembered after they die. Jay Whiss released his first work under Universal, the EP Dark Cloud, on June 5, 2019. The EP was also featured on Spotify's Northern Sound playlist. It contains the songs "How It Goes" and "Every Night", with vocals from Jimmy Prime and Safe, as well as the eponymous lead single, "Dark Cloud". The EP is dedicated to Koba and Smoke Dawg, and serves as a prelude to his forthcoming debut album. Full Circle affiliate and Halal Gang member Puffy L'z released the album Take No L'z in August 2019. Jay Whiss made an appearance on the single "Boring", featuring Smoke Dawg.

Jay Whiss also made a vocal appearance on Prime Boys member and longtime friend Donnie's debut album, From the Beginning to End, on the song "Huddle". The record was released on November 22, 2019. He was also featured on 6ixBuzz's second release, NorthernSound, which came out on December 13, 2019, on the track "The World is Yours", alongside Jimmy Prime and Safe.

Jay Whiss was listed at number ten in Complex's Top 20 Canadian Artists to Watch Out for in 2020. During the month of December 2019, he announced that his debut album, Peace of Mind, was slated for a release in early 2020. The lead single, "Valet", produced by Murda Beatz, came out on December 3, 2020, and featured vocals from Puffy L'z. The album was also supported by another Murda Beatz-produced track, titled "Lay Low", featuring Donnie, which was released on February 6, 2020. Peace of Mind came out on March 3, 2020, and featured a vocal appearance from Jimmy Prime on the song "Left Me for Dead". The record received an 8/10 rating by Kyle Mullin of Exclaim!, who described Jay Whiss as an artist who balances such "hood hedonism with genuinely thoughtful bars that make for a well-rounded listen". In 2022, Jay Whiss made an appearance on Jimmy Prime's EP Incase we don't make it to tomorrow, on the single "Paradise", released on June 13. This would be his last release before his death, in 2025.

His second studio album, Whole Hearted, was published posthumously on streaming platforms in September 2025.

== Death and legacy ==
In August 2025, Jimmy Prime announced on Instagram that Jay Whiss had died in March 2025 due to complications from brain cancer. The family chose to keep the matter private at the time of his death, only announcing it to the public four months later. Jay Whiss spent the last moments of his life in Alberta.

The Juno Awards of 2026, held on March 29, paid homage to Jay Whiss and included him in the 2026 In Memoriam, which pays tribute to members of the Canadian music community who died in the last year, honouring their lasting contributions to Canada's culture.

== Artistry ==
=== Influences ===
Jay Whiss has cited several hip hop artists as influencing his rapping style, including Ludacris, Missy Elliott, The Notorious B.I.G., and Jay Z, while also crediting various Canadian musicians, such as Solitair, Kardinal Offishall, and Point Blank.

== Discography ==
=== Solo ===
Studio albums

- Peace of Mind (2020)
- Whole Hearted (2025)

EPs

- Dark Cloud (2019)

Compilation appearances

- "Brown Money" Keep God First (Murda Beatz, 2016)
- "World Is Yours" NorthernSound (6ixbuzz, 2019)

=== with Prime Boys ===
- Koba World (2018)

== Filmography ==
Film
| Year | Title | Role | Notes |
|---|---|---|---|
| 2017 | 6IX RISING | Himself | Documentary of Toronto's rising hip-hop scene featuring numerous Canadian rap artists. |
| 2019 | Remember Me, Toronto | Himself | Short film by Mustafa the Poet |
