= Bleeding Bull =

EP by Jimmy Prime
- Released: March 28, 2017
- Recorded: 2016–17
- Genre: Canadian Hip Hop
- Label: PRIME
- Producer: Murda Beatz

Jimmy Prime chronology
Block Boy (2015)	Bleeding Bull (2017)	Koba World (2018)

Professional ratings
Review scores
Source	Rating
Exclaim!	6/10

Bleeding Bull is the debut EP by Canadian rapper Jimmy Prime. The production duties on the six-track EP were handled by STWO, Wonda Gurl, Murda Beatz and Arthur McArthur and it was released on March 28, 2017. The EP received a 6/10 by Scott Glaysher of Exclaim!, who described the EP as "not [Jimmy Prime's] best work to date, but he's stayed true to his sound, something he holds dear."

== Track listing ==
1. "Intro" – 1:33
2. "My Way" – 2:40
3. "Pisces" – 3:11
4. "Digital Money" – 2:06
5. "Gucci Denim" – 3:57
6. "Moscow Mule" – 3:17

== Personnel ==
- Amir Jamm – producer on "My Way"
- Arthur McArthur – producer on "My Way", "Pisces", "Gucci Denim" and "Moscow Mule"
- Murda Beatz – producer on "Digital Money"
- Stwo – producer on "Digital Money"
- Wonda Gurl – producer on "Intro"
