= Treadwell (name) =

Treadwell is an English surname. Notable people with the name include:

- Aaron Louis Treadwell (1866–1947), American professor of zoology
- Alexander Treadwell (born 1946), American politician from New York
- Anthony Treadwell (1922–2003), New Zealand architect, educator and painter
- Charles J. Treadwell (1920–2010), British diplomat
- Daniel Treadwell (1791–1872), American inventor
- David Treadwell (born 1965), American football placekicker
- Demetrius Treadwell (born 1991), American basketball player
- Don Treadwell (born 1960), American football coach and player
- Donnie E. Treadwell (1923–2014), American politician
- Elizabeth Treadwell (born 1967), American poet
- Frederick Pearson Treadwell (1857–1919), American-Swiss chemist
- Geoffrey Treadwell (1892–1967), South African cricket umpire
- George Treadwell (1918/9–1967), American jazz trumpeter
- Harold Treadwell (1897–1971), African-American baseball pitcher
- Harriet Taylor Treadwell (1870–1931), American educator, suffragist
- Jack L. Treadwell (1919–1977), United States Army officer
- James Treadwell, British former academic and author of fantasy novels
- John Treadwell (1745–1823), American politician from Connecticut
- John Treadwell (miner) (1842–1927), Canadian gold miner in Alaska
- Johnny Treadwell (1941–2014), American football player
- Laquon Treadwell (born 1995), American football wide receiver
- Liam Treadwell (1986–2020), English National Hunt jockey
- Marc T. Treadwell (born 1955), United States district judge
- Mead Treadwell (born 1956), American politician from Alaska
- Nicholas Treadwell (born 1937), British art dealer and gallery owner
- Oscar Treadwell (1926–2006), American jazz radio journalist and presenter
- Sophie Treadwell (1885–1970), American playwright and journalist
- Timothy Treadwell (1957–2003), American environmentalist
- Valentine Treadwell (c. 1813–1888), New York politician

== See also ==
- Tredwell
- Dominic Treadwell-Collins (born 1977), British television producer
