= Koba World =

Studio album by Prime Boys
- Released: July 27, 2018
- Recorded: 2017–2018
- Genre: Canadian hip hop
- Label: eOne Music
- Producer: Murda Beatz

Jimmy Prime chronology
Bleeding Bull (2017)	Koba World (2018)	Blue Mercedes (2021)

Jay Whiss chronology
Koba World (2018)	Peace of Mind (2020)

Donnie chronology
Koba World (2018)	From the Beginning to End (2019)

Singles from Koba World
- 1. "Come Wit It" Released: November 28, 2017; 2. "Tinted" Released: February 28, 2018; 3. "Hold Me Down" Released: June 15, 2018; 4. "Sopranos" Released: May 17, 2018

Professional ratings
Review scores
Source	Rating
Exclaim!	9/10
Now	3/5 stars

Koba World is the debut studio album by Prime Boys. It was released on July 27, 2018. The album was originally slated to be titled Prime Forever but was renamed to Koba World as a dedication to their best friend, Kosi Modekwe aka Koba Prime, who was killed earlier in the year with Halal Gang member Smoke Dawg. The album received a 9/10 score by Exclaim! and was heavily produced by Murda Beatz. It was supported by the singles "Hold Me Down," "Sopranos," "Tinted" and "Come Wit It".

== Background ==
In January 2018, it was announced that the Prime Boys are working on their debut collaboration album due to be released sometime in the summer of 2018 initially titled Prime Forever. The following month, the group released the single "Tinted" produced by Murda Beatz marking it as the lead single of the upcoming album. The music video for the single was directed by Elliot Clancy Osberg and saw the group ride ATVs in the tundra on a frozen lake. The song went on to feature on Northern Bars as well as giving Prime Boys an influence to further their careers and promote Canada’s expanding hip-hop market. Clash conducted an interview on the Toronto Music Scene and published an article which portrays Toronto's rap underground on March 12, 2018. In the interview, Whiss described Toronto as a city that isn't a mystery anymore and that he wants his music to transcend everywhere. Full Circle affiliate, Smoke Dawg and Prime Boys assistant manager, Koba Prime were reportedly shot and killed on June 30, 2018, in an incident involving multiple victims. The death of Koba Prime influenced the change of Prime Boys upcoming album to Koba World as a tribute. Whiss went on to say that "names never die, and that their names always live on" in regards to the album name change. Highlighting that the title of the album is to keep Koba's legacy to go on. The album was officially released on July 27, 2018, and was also supported by the singles "Hold Me Down" and "Sopranos". The group also participated in distributing exclusive Prime Boys merchandise on August 10, 2018, in a pop-up shop near St. Lawrence Market.

== Critical reception ==
Exclaim! gave the album 9/10. Music Critic Erin Lowers highlights that the Prime Boys "present realities and future goals, with friends, family, and love acting as the glue between them. Between "Hold Me Down" and the sinister "Dead Prime Ministers," it becomes evident that above all, loyalty is a fundamental pillar in their existence, and a standard in their music."

Now gave the album 3 out of 5. Nick Flanagan of the company went on to describe the album as a "friendly mixture of the celebratory and the mournful" in regards to the murder of their assistant manager and friend Kosi Modekwe.

== Track listing ==
1. Emergency 3:29
2. Koba World 3:20
3. Come Wit It 2:55
4. Street Dreams 3:58
5. Tinted 3:34
6. So What 3:01
7. See Through 2:52
8. Better in Designer 3:24
9. Hold Me Down 3:42
10. Touch Down 3:24
11. Sopranos 3:49
12. Dead Prime Ministers 4:22
