= Moscow Mule (disambiguation) =

A Moscow mule is a cocktail.

Moscow Mule may also refer to:

- "Moscow Mule" (The Great), a 2020 television episode
- "Moscow Mule" (Orange Is the New Black), a 2013 television episode
- "Moscow Mule" (song) by Bad Bunny (2022)
- Moscow Mule, a 1996 book by James Young
- "Moscow Mule", a 2017 song by Jimmy Prime from Bleeding Bull
