= David Crombie Park =

Park in Toronto, Ontario, Canada

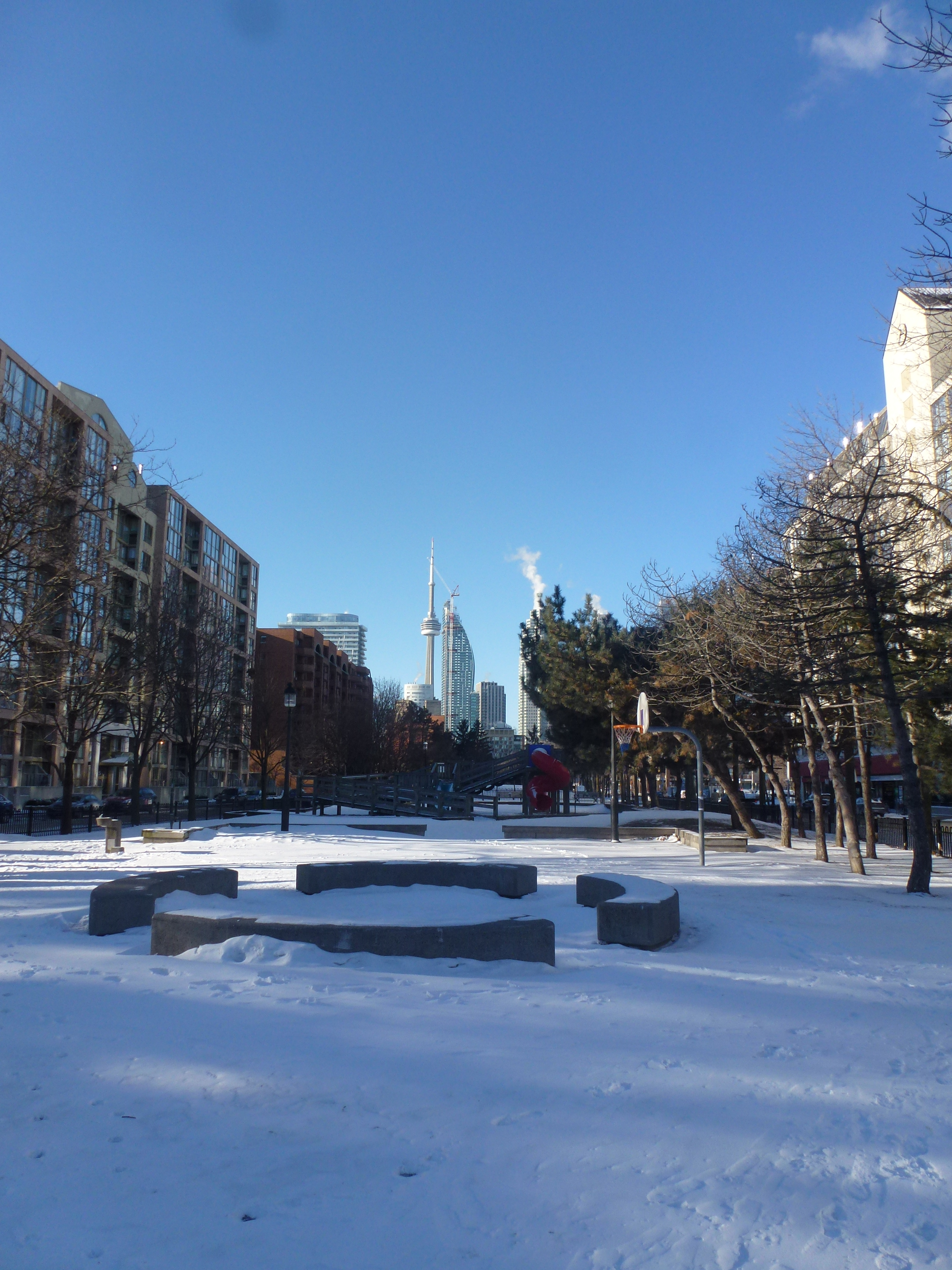
- The park in 2014
- Interactive map of David Crombie Park
- Location: 131 The Esplanade; Toronto, Ontario
- Coordinates: 43°38′53″N 79°22′13″W
- Area: 1.6 ha (4.0 acres)
- Operator: Toronto Parks
- Website: David Crombie Park

David Crombie Park is a park in downtown Toronto that is the spine of the St Lawrence Neighbourhood. While not a destination for visitors from outside the neighbourhood, the park is well used by residents, and by tourists using it as a corridor to walk from downtown to the entertainments found in the nearby Distillery District.

== Namesake ==
The park is named after David Crombie, who, during his successive three term as mayor of Toronto, had taken a leadership role in the redevelopment of the neighbourhood that surrounds the park. The efforts of Crombie and his colleagues, to preserve the human scale of the neighbourhood, and keep it liveable, are widely praised, in retrospect. The neighbourhood has been called "the gold standard for mixed development" and "the best example of a mixed-income, mixed-use, pedestrian-friendly, sensitively scaled, densely populated community ever built in the province."
