= Back on Road =

Single by Gucci Mane featuring Drake

Single by Gucci Mane featuring Drake

from the album Everybody Looking
- Released: June 4, 2016
- Recorded: 2016
- Genre: Hip hop; trap
- Length: 2:29
- Label: GUWOP; Atlantic
- Songwriters: Radric Davis; Aubrey Graham; Shane Lindstrom; Matthew Samuels
- Producers: Murda Beatz; Boi-1da

Gucci Mane singles chronology
| "1st Day Out tha Feds" (2016) | "Back on Road" (2016) | "Champions" (2016) |

Drake singles chronology
| "For Free" (2016) | "Back on Road" (2016) | "Controlla" (2016) |

"Back on Road" is a song by American rapper Gucci Mane featuring Canadian rapper Drake, released as the second single from the former's ninth studio album Everybody Looking (2016). The song was written alongside Canadian producers Murda Beatz and Boi-1da.

The song premiered on episode 23 of OVO Sound Radio. Even though Drake was credited as a feature on the single release, he was officially credited as a co-lead on the album release.

== Charts ==
| Chart (2016) | Peak position |
|---|---|
| US Billboard Hot 100 | 81 |
| US Hot R&B/Hip-Hop Songs (Billboard) | 28 |

== Certifications ==
| Region | Certification | Certified units/sales |
|---|---|---|
| United States (RIAA) | Gold | 500,000^{‡} |
^{‡} Sales+streaming figures based on certification alone.

== Release history ==
| Region | Date | Format | Label | Ref. |
|---|---|---|---|---|
| United States | June 4, 2016 | Digital download | GUWOP; Atlantic | |
