= Donnie =

Donnie or Donny is a familiar form (hypocorism) of the masculine given name Donald, Donal, Don, or Donovan.

== People ==
=== Arts and entertainment ===
- Donny Baldwin, American drummer best known as a member of Jefferson Starship and Starship
- Donnie Brooks (1936–2007), American pop music singer
- Donnie Dacus, guitarist
- Donnie Demers, American songwriter
- Donny Deutsch (born 1957), American advertising executive and television personality
- Donnie Dunagan (born 1934), semi-retired American former child actor
- Donnie Elbert (1936–1989), American soul singer
- Donnie Fritts (1942–2019), American session musician and songwriter
- Donnie Hamzik, drummer of the heavy metal band Manowar
- Donny Hathaway (1945–1979), American jazz, blues, soul and gospel singer, songwriter, arranger and pianist
- Donnie Iris (born 1943), American rock musician known for his work with the Jaggerz and Wild Cherry
- Donnie Keshawarz (born 1969), American stage, film and television actor
- Donnie Klang (born 1984), American singer, songwriter
- Donny MacLeod (1932-1984), Scottish television presenter
- Donny McCaslin (born 1966), American jazz saxophonist
- Donnie McClurkin (born 1959), American gospel music singer and minister
- Donnie Munro (born 1953), Scottish musician
- Donny Osmond (born 1957), American singer, actor, dancer
- Donny Pangilinan (born 1998), Filipino actor, VJ, host, singer and model
- Donnie Simpson (born 1954), American radio DJ, television and movie personality
- Donnie Van Zant (born 1952), American rock vocalist and guitarist
- Donnie Wahlberg (born 1969), American singer, actor and film producer
- Donnie Yen (born 1963), Hong Kong actor, martial artist, film director and producer
- Donnie (Canadian rapper), Canadian rapper
- Donnie (Dutch rapper) (born 1994), Dutch rapper and songwriter

=== Sports ===
- Donnie Abraham (born 1973), American football cornerback
- Donnie Allison (born 1939), American race car driver
- Donny Anderson (born 1943), American football player
- Donnie Avery (born 1984), American football player
- Donnie Beechler (born 1961), American race car driver
- Donnie Boyce (born 1973), American basketball player
- Donny Brady (born 1973), American football player
- Donnie Craft (born 1959), American football player
- Donny Crevels (born 1974), Dutch race car driver
- Donny Davies (1892–1958), English cricketer, amateur footballer and journalist
- Donnie Davis (born 1972), American football player
- Donnie Ernsberger (born 1996), American football player
- Donnie Edwards (born 1973), American football linebacker
- Donny Everett (1997–2016), American baseball player
- Donny Grant (born 1976), Costa Rican footballer
- Donnie Green (1948–2019), American former football offensive lineman
- Donny Gorter (born 1988), Dutch footballer
- Donny de Groot (born 1979), Dutch former footballer
- Donnie K. Von Hemel (born 1961), trainer of Thoroughbred racehorses
- Donnie Henderson (born 1975), American football coach
- Donnie Jones (basketball) (born 1966), American college basketball coach and player
- Donnie Lewis (born 1997), American football player
- Donny Marshall (born 1972), American basketball player
- Donnie McKinnon (born 1940), Scottish footballer
- Donnie Meche (born 1974), American jockey
- Donnie Moore (1954–1989), American baseball player
- Donnie Nelson (born 1962), American basketball executive
- Donnie Neuenberger (born 1962), American race car driver
- Donnie Nickey (born 1980), American football safety
- Donnie Nietes (born 1982), Filipino professional boxer
- Donnie Sadler (born 1975), American baseball player
- Donny Schmit (1967-1996), American motocross racer
- Donnie Shell (born 1952), American football strong safety for the Pittsburgh Steelers
- Donnie Smith (soccer) (born 1990), American soccer player
- Donny Toia (born 1992), American soccer player
- Donnie Tyndall (born 1970), American head men's basketball coach
- Donny van de Beek (born 1997), Dutch footballer
- Donnie Walsh (born 1941), American basketball executive
- Donny White, athletics administrator and baseball coach
- Donnie Williams (born 1948), American football player
- Donnie Wingo (born 1960), American auto racing crew chief

=== Other fields ===
- Donnie Anderson, American Baptist minister and activist
- Donnie Burns (born 1979), Scottish politician
- Donny Lambeth (born 1965), American politician
- Donny Olson (born 1953), American politician
- Donnie E. Treadwell (1923–2014), American politician
- Donny George Youkhanna (1950-2011), Iraqi-Assyrian archaeologist, anthropologist, author, curator and professor

=== Criminals ===
- Donny Meluda, alias Abdul Rahman Abdullah, a Malaysian ex-fugitive and convicted robber serving a 33-year jail sentence in Singapore for multiple violent robberies.

=== Aliases and stage names ===
- "Donnie Brasco", alias of undercover FBI agent Joseph D. Pistone (born 1939)
- Donny Goines, stage name of American rapper Donny Scott
- Donny Montell, stage name of Lithuanian singer-songwriter Donatas Montvydas (born 1987)
- Donny Tourette, stage name of English singer-songwriter Patrick Brannan (born 1981)
- Donny Young, an early-stage name of American musician and singer Donald Eugene Lytle (1938–2003), better known as Johnny Paycheck

=== Fictional characters ===
- Donnie Darko, the protagonist of the film Donnie Darko

== Animals ==
- Donnie (dog), a Doberman Pinscher known for his penchant for arranging his plush toys in geometric forms
