= Everybody Looking =

Studio album by Gucci Mane
- Released: July 22, 2016
- Recorded: May–June 2016
- Studio: Sandra Gale (Calabasas); Sota (Toronto)
- Genre: Hip-hop; trap
- Length: 52:13
- Label: GUWOP; Atlantic
- Producer: Boi-1da; Drumma Boy; Mike Will Made It; Murda Beatz; Myles Harris; Will-A-Fool; Zaytoven

Gucci Mane chronology
Tru Colors (2016)	Everybody Looking (2016)	Woptober (2016)

Singles from Everybody Looking
- 1. "1st Day Out tha Feds" Released: May 27, 2016; 2. "Back on Road" Released: June 4, 2016; 3. "All My Children" Released: June 24, 2016

Everybody Looking is the ninth studio album by American rapper Gucci Mane. It was released on July 22, 2016, by GUWOP Enterprises and Atlantic Records. The album serves as Gucci's first studio release while out of prison since The Return of Mr. Zone 6 (2011). It features guest appearances from Drake, Kanye West and Young Thug, while the majority of the album's production was provided by Gucci Mane's longtime collaborators such as Mike Will Made It and Zaytoven, among others.

Everybody Looking received generally positive reviews from critics and debuted at number two on the US Billboard 200, and becoming Gucci Mane's highest-charting album.

== Background ==
In June 2016, the album was announced, following Gucci Mane's release from prison in May 2016. Recording sessions for the entire album took place in under six days.

== Promotion ==
On July 12, 2016, Gucci Mane released the album's promotional single, "Multi Millionaire Laflare". The album's intro track, "No Sleep", was released on July 15, 2016, the music video for the song was released on July 18.

The album's lead single, "1st Day Out tha Feds", was released on May 27, 2016. The song was produced by Mike Will Made It. The album's second single, "Back on Road" with Drake, was released on June 4, 2016. The song was produced by Murda Beatz. The album's third single, "All My Children", was released on June 24, 2016. The song was produced by Drumma Boy.

== Critical reception ==
Professional ratings
Aggregate scores
Source	Rating
AnyDecentMusic?	6.6/10
Metacritic	72/100
Review scores
Source	Rating
AllMusic	4/5 stars
Consequence	B−
The Guardian	3/5 stars
HipHopDX	3.7/5
The Observer	2/5 stars
Pitchfork	7.0/10
RapReviews	5.5/10
Rolling Stone	3.5/5 stars
Spin	8/10
XXL	4/5

Everybody Looking was met with generally positive reviews. At Metacritic, which assigns a normalized rating out of 100 to reviews from mainstream publications, the album received an average score of 72, based on 13 reviews. Aggregator AnyDecentMusic? gave it 6.6 out of 10, based on their assessment of the critical consensus.

Neil Z. Yeung of AllMusic gave a positive review, stating "Everybody Looking is one of the best examples of Gucci Mane's contributions to rap in his highly prolific catalog". Narsimha Chintaluri of HipHopDX said, "Mike WiLL Made-It and Zaytoven construct a cinematic backdrop, but Gucci's execution is a bit wanting. Regardless, it's a clear step in the right direction, a completely different beast than the b-side littered mixtapes he's sanctioned from behind bars over the past three years, and begs for repeat listens". Christina Lee of Rolling Stone said, "Everybody Looking, Gucci's ninth album and first after a two-year stay in federal prison, is a compelling left turn, the sound of a veteran innovator reclaiming his territory not with larger-than-life charisma and off-the-wall imagery but fresh intimidation tactics". Julian Benbow of The Boston Globe wrote: "There's less party and more perspective. He sees the troubles he went through before prison for what they are."

David Drake of Pitchfork stated, "It will please fans looking for Another Gucci Mane mixtape. Everyone else will likely find it a bit spotty. Certain songs fall into familiar—now six- or seven-year-old—formulas. His vocals, no doubt out of practice, sound a bit rusty. But most of all, it just feels unfinished, rushed". In a mixed review, The Guardian's Lanre Bakare stated: "As usual, he's at his best when things get a little weird." Michael G. Barilleaux of RapReviews said, "While the beats are relatively mediocre and not at all unusual for this brand of hip-hop, they do a decent job matching the dark picture Gucci paints. Unfortunately, that picture is more of a rough sketch as Gucci steers more toward unrefined flows and bland, mechanically arching vocals rather than a more thought out approach". In another mixed review, Damien Morris of The Observer said, "The eerie emotional electricity and forensic detail of the single "1st Day Out tha Feds" dissipates across 14 songs that desperately lack variety and humour, and choruses that aren't just Gucci grimly repeating the song's title".

== Commercial performance ==
Everybody Looking debuted at number two on the US Billboard 200 with 68,000 album-equivalent units, 43,000 of which were pure album sales.

== Track listing ==
Everybody Looking track listing
No.	Title	Writer(s)	Producer(s)	Length
1.	"No Sleep (Intro)"	Radric Davis; Michael Williams II; Xavier Dotson	Mike Will Made It; Zaytoven	3:34
2.	"Out Do Ya"	Davis; Dotson	Zaytoven	2:56
3.	"Back on Road" (with Drake)	Davis; Shane Lindstrom; Aubrey Graham; Matthew Samuels	Murda Beatz; Boi-1da	2:29
4.	"Waybach"	Davis; Williams II; Dotson	Mike Will Made It; Zaytoven	3:33
5.	"Pussy Print" (featuring Kanye West)	Davis; Williams II; Marquel Middlebrooks; Khalif Brown; Kanye West	Mike Will Made It; Marz^{[a]}; Swae Lee^{[a]}	3:35
6.	"Pop Music"	Davis; Williams II; Myles Harris	Mike Will Made It; Harris	3:19
7.	"Guwop Home" (featuring Young Thug)	Davis; Williams II; Dotson; Jeffery Williams	Mike Will Made It; Zaytoven	3:42
8.	"Gucci Please"	Davis; Williams II	Mike Will Made It	3:22
9.	"Robbed"	Davis; Dotson	Zaytoven	3:24
10.	"Richest Nigga in the Room"	Davis; Williams II; Dotson	Mike Will Made It; Zaytoven	4:03
11.	"1st Day Out tha Feds"	Davis; Williams II; Asheton Hogan	Mike Will Made It; Pluss^{[a]}	3:04
12.	"At Least a M"	Davis; Williams II; Dotson	Mike Will Made It; Zaytoven	3:50
13.	"All My Children"	Davis; Christopher Gholson	Drumma Boy	3:43
14.	"Pick Up the Pieces (Outro)"	Davis; Dotson; Willie Byrd	Zaytoven; Will-A-Fool	3:53
Total length:				48:27

Bonus track
No.	Title	Writer(s)	Producer(s)	Length
15.	"Multi Millionaire Laflare"	Davis; Joshua Luellen	Southside	3:46
Total length:				52:13

Notes

- ^{^[a]} signifies a co-producer

== Personnel ==
Credits adapted from the album's liner notes.

Performers

- Gucci Mane – primary artist
- Drake – featured artist
- Kanye West – featured artist
- Young Thug – featured artist

Production

- Drumma Boy – producer
- Mike Will Made It – producer
- Murda Beatz – producer
- Myles Harris – producer
- Boi-1da – producer
- Southside – producer
- Will-A-Fool – producer
- Zaytoven – producer
- Pluss – co-producer
- Marz – co-producer
- Swae Lee – co-producer

Technical

- Kori Anders – mixing
- Harley Arsenal – recording assistant
- Chris Athens – mastering
- Noel Cadastre – recording
- Noel "Gadget" Campbell – mixing
- Noah Goldstein – recording assistant
- Aaron Holton – arranger
- The Sauce – recording, mixing
- Jaycen Joshua – mixing
- Dave Kutch – mastering
- Greg Moffet – recording assistant
- 40 – recording, mixing assistant
- Sean Paine – recording
- Peter "Zlender" Vickers – mixing assistant
- Mike Will Made It – mixing

Additional personnel

- Jonathan Mannion – photography
- Shun Melson – styling direction
- Virgilio Tzaj – art direction, design

== Charts ==
=== Weekly charts ===
Chart performance for Everybody Looking
Chart (2016)	Peak position
Belgian Albums (Ultratop Flanders)	145
Belgian Albums (Ultratop Wallonia)	166
Canadian Albums (Billboard)	11
Dutch Albums (Album Top 100)	65
French Albums (SNEP)	109
New Zealand Heatseekers Albums (RMNZ)	2
US Billboard 200	2
US Top R&B/Hip-Hop Albums (Billboard)	1

=== Year-end charts ===
2016 year-end chart performance for Everybody Looking
Chart (2016)	Position
US Billboard 200	144
US Top R&B/Hip-Hop Albums (Billboard)	31

== Certifications ==
Certifications for Everybody Looking
Region	Certification	Certified units/sales
United States (RIAA)	Gold	500,000^{‡}
^{‡} Sales+streaming figures based on certification alone.
