= Pussy Print =

2016 song by Gucci Mane featuring Kanye West

Song by Gucci Mane featuring Kanye West

from the album Everybody Looking
- Recorded: 2016
- Genre: Hip hop; trap
- Length: 3:35
- Label: 1017; Atlantic
- Songwriters: Radric Davis; Michael Williams II; Marquel Middlebrooks; Khalif Brown; Kanye West
- Producers: Mike Will Made It; Marz (add.); Swae Lee (add.)

"Pussy Print" (censored on the album as "P**** Print") is a song by American rapper Gucci Mane featuring fellow American rapper Kanye West, from the former's ninth studio album Everybody Looking (2016). The track samples the 1996 song "Rundgang um die transzendentale säule der singularität" by black metal one-man band Burzum throughout.

== Commercial performance ==
Upon the release of Everybody Looking, "Pussy Print" debuted at its peak of number 89 on the US Billboard Hot 100.

== Charts ==
Chart (2016)	Peak position
US Billboard Hot 100	89
US Hot R&B/Hip-Hop Songs (Billboard)	31
