= 1st Day Out tha Feds =

Single by Gucci Mane

from the album Everybody Looking
- Released: May 27, 2016
- Length: 3:04
- Label: GUWOP; Atlantic
- Songwriters: Radric Davis; Michael Williams II; Asheton Hogan
- Producers: Mike Will Made It; Pluss (add.)

Gucci Mane singles chronology
"Plug" (2016)	"1st Day Out tha Feds" (2016)	"Back on Road" (2016)

Music video
- "1st Day Out tha Feds" on YouTube

"1st Day Out tha Feds" is a song by American rapper Gucci Mane, released on May 27, 2016. It is the lead single from his ninth studio album Everybody Looking (2016) and the first song he released after he was released from jail the day before. The song was produced by Mike Will Made It.

== Background ==
In 2014, Gucci Mane was arrested for possession of firearm and agreed to a plea deal that reduced his sentence to September 2016. He was released earlier than expected, on May 26, 2016. Shortly after his release, he began recording music in the studio. He premiered the song on The Breakfast Club on the following morning.

== Content ==
In the song, Gucci Mane raps about the violence he is used to and his harsh life in prison, reflecting on his family and past mistakes as well: "They call me crazy so much I think I'm starting to believe 'em / I did some things to some people that was downright evil / Is it karma coming back to me, so much drama? / My own mama turned her back on me, and that's my mama".

== Critical reception ==
The song was met with generally positive reviews. Tom Breihan of Stereogum compared it to Gucci Mane's 2009 song "First Day Out", another song about being released from prison, writing, "But he may have outdone that one with his new one." Paul A. Thompson of Pitchfork wrote that "Gucci's delivery is less congested, less guttural, but the writing is as sharp as ever".

== Music video ==
The music video was released on July 5, 2016. Directed by Gabriel Hart, it finds Gucci Mane in his house, throwing money and appearing with several clones in his home office.

== Charts ==
Chart (2016)	Peak position
US Bubbling Under Hot 100 (Billboard)	8
US Hot R&B/Hip-Hop Songs (Billboard)	42

== Certifications ==
Region	Certification	Certified units/sales
United States (RIAA)	Gold	500,000^{‡}
^{‡} Sales+streaming figures based on certification alone.
