= Friyie =

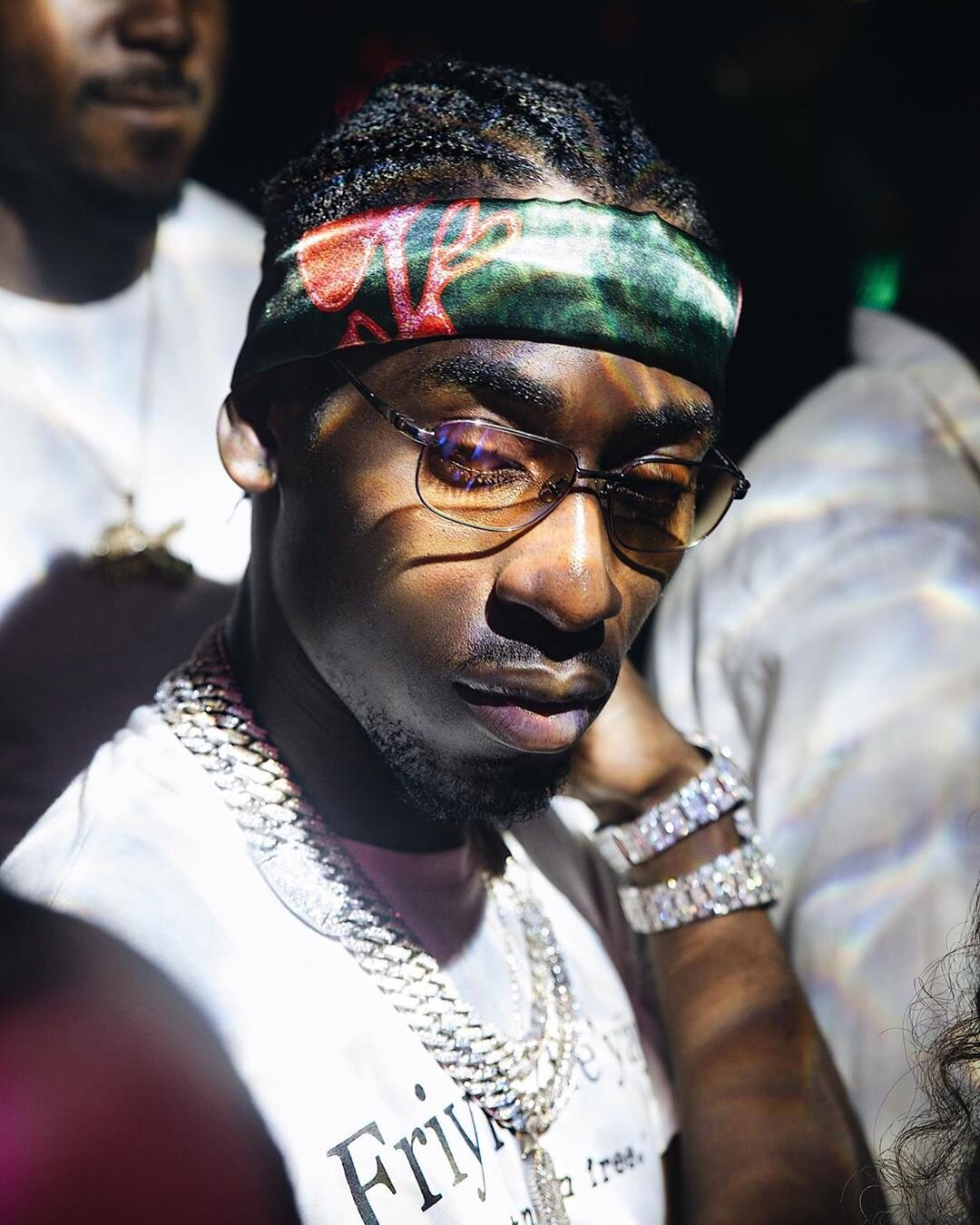

Background information
- Born: David Afriyie Obeng; Toronto, Ontario, Canada
- Occupations: Singer; songwriter; rapper
- Website: www.friyie.com

David Afriyie Obeng (born 3 March 1993), known professionally as Friyie, is a Canadian singer, songwriter, and rapper. His 2017 single "Money Team" became the soundtrack to the Mayweather vs. McGregor press conferences. His debut extended play, ANF: Ain’t Nothing Free, was released on March 22, 2019, by BONG Ent and Empire, which received positive reviews from Now and Exclaim!, who gave the EP a 9/10 rating. Notable collaborators include Roddy Ricch, NorthSideBenji and Tory Lanez, who featured on his project, while others include Bun B, Rick Ross, and Dexta Daps.

== Early life ==
Friyie was born on March 3, 1993, in Toronto, Ontario to first generation immigrants of Ghanaian descent. He grew up in a rough neighbourhood of Jane and Finch, notorious for gang and crime activity. Friyie's early interest in music and business kept him apart from the street life. He attended and graduated from York University.

== Career ==
Friyie's "Come and Get It" song featured on DJ Charlie B mixtapes. In 2017 "Money Team" streamed millions of views internationally featuring on Showtime, Vice, Rap Caviar-Spotify, Apple Music and Billboard. In the same year he opened for Cardi B at T-Mobile Arena in Las Vegas. In 2019, he released his debut project ANF: Ain't Nothing Free.

In June 2020, Friyie released Before the Flight EP, with a deluxe version three months later. In July 2020, he featured on Dexta Daps' album Vent which reached the top 10 on the Billboard Reggae Chart.

== Discography ==
=== Extended plays ===
- 2019: ANF: Ain't Nothing Free
- 2020: Before the Flight
- 2020: Before the Flight (Deluxe)
- 2022: Never 2 Late

=== Mixtapes ===
- 2016: Giinchy 5x
- 2012: Hottest in the City Vol.1

== Filmography ==
Film and television
Year	Title	Role	Notes
2017	6ix Rising	Himself	Vice's Toronto Hip-Hop Documentary
2017	All Access: Mayweather vs. McGregor - Episode 3	Himself	Showtime's Boxing TV Mini-Series
