= 6ix Rising =

- Promotional poster featuring Pressa
- Directed by: Shawney Cohen
- Produced by: Lauren Sing; Jade Smith; Patric McGuire (Executive); Tania Natscheff (Executive); Gregory Jones (Executive)
- Starring: Big Lean; Castro Guapo; Fiji; Friyie; Pressa; Jazz Cartier; Jimmy Prime; Jay Whiss; Andre Bryam; Sunny Diamonds; Keith Bell; Dukey Dukez
- Cinematography: Norman Wong, Chris Wardle
- Edited by: Navin Harrilal
- Music by: Stephen Dranitsaris
- Distributed by: Noisey
- Release date: November 16, 2017
- Running time: 77 min.
- Country: Canada
- Language: English

External videos
- "6IX RISING" on YouTube

6IX RISING: Toronto’s Rap Ascendence (pronounced six rising) is a Canadian documentary film about the hip hop culture in Canada. The film was directed by Shawney Cohen and released on November 16, 2017. It was distributed by Vice Media's online channel Noisey and made in collaboration with Nicolas Girard and Rafael Ruiz for Worship Studio.

== Background ==
The documentary showcases the rising hip hop scene of Toronto, after the blockbuster success of Drake and The Weeknd. The film analyses the attention on how the success of these artists has turned the city's local rap scene into a hyper-competitive, and creative environment where young artists are competing for attention on the world stage. Artists and repertoire manager Lucas Prince, was involved with connecting the documentary makers with artists from Toronto to participate in the film. It was listed at number 3 in Now's Top Five Black Films to watch in 2018.

The film was premiered to a limited audience at Hot Docs Ted Rogers Cinema on the day of release. It also had a limited screening at the Maria A. Shchuka Library on February 9, 2018 and at the Toronto Reference Library on February 28, 2018, which were both presented by Noisey. All photo animations for the film were done by Nicolas Girard and Rafael Ruiz for Worship Studio. Some topics in the documentary include; Pressa's postponed rise due to legal issues, Friyie getting a lucky break from Floyd Mayweather Jr. & how Jimmy Prime reflects on coining the term '6ix' for Toronto. It was noted for providing an in-depth look into the Toronto's diverse and competitive hip hop culture scene.

== Cast ==
All artist appear as their respective stage name.

- Big Lean
- Castro Guapo (CMDWN)
- Fiji (CMDWN)
- Friyie
- Pressa
- Jazz Cartier
- Jimmy Prime
- Jay Whiss
- Sick PPL
- Andre Bryam
- Sunny Diamonds
- Keith Bell
- Dukey Dukez
- Drake
- Roy Woods^{1}
- Floyd Mayweather Jr.^{1}

=== Notes ===
^{1} Non-speaking appearance
