= List of Canadian provinces and territories' largest municipalities =

This is a list of the largest municipalities of Canadian provinces and territories by population as of the 2021 Census.Capitals are designated in italics.

Province/territory	Largest municipality	2nd largest	3rd largest
Alberta	Calgary	Edmonton	Red Deer
British Columbia	Vancouver	Surrey	Burnaby
Manitoba	Winnipeg	Brandon	Steinbach
New Brunswick	Moncton	Saint John	Fredericton
Newfoundland and Labrador	St. John's	Conception Bay South	Paradise
Northwest Territories	Yellowknife	Hay River	Inuvik
Nova Scotia	Halifax	Cape Breton	Kings County
Nunavut	Iqaluit	Rankin Inlet	Arviat
Ontario	Toronto	Ottawa	Mississauga
Prince Edward Island	Charlottetown	Summerside	Stratford
Quebec	Montreal	Quebec City	Laval
Saskatchewan	Saskatoon	Regina	Prince Albert
Yukon	Whitehorse	Dawson City	Watson Lake
