= Murda Beatz =

Canadian record producer (born 1994)

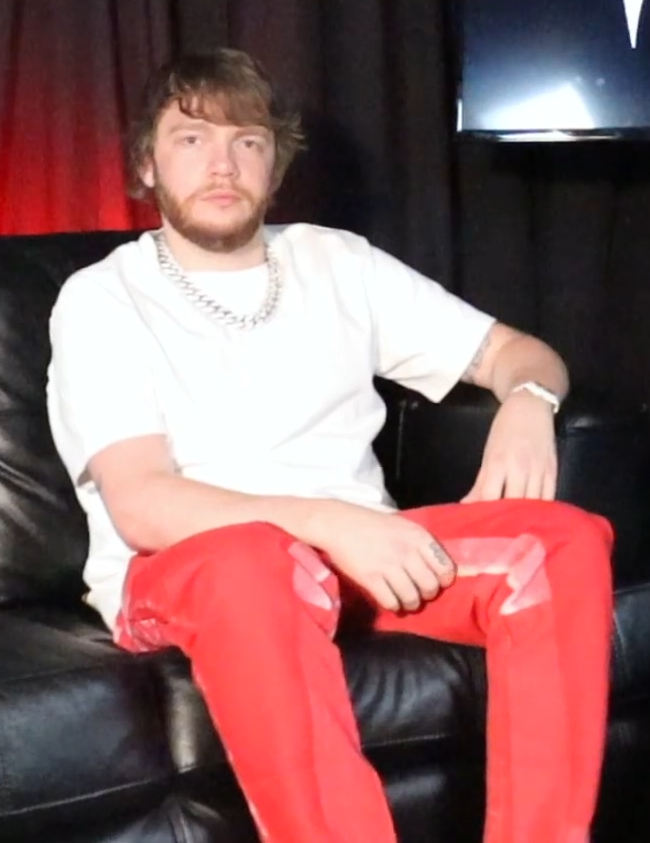
- Murda Beatz in 2022

Background information
- Also known as: Young Murda; Murda
- Born: Shane Lee Lindstrom; February 11, 1994 (age 32); Fort Erie, Ontario, Canada
- Origin: Toronto, Ontario, Canada
- Genres: Hip-hop; trap
- Occupations: Record producer; songwriter
- Years active: 2011–present
- Labels: Warner (current); Interscope (former)
- Website: murdabeatz.com

Shane Lee Lindstrom (born February 11, 1994), known professionally as Murda Beatz, is a Canadian record producer. Working predominantly in hip-hop and trap music, he has produced hit songs and albums for various musical acts since 2011. His credits include the singles "Butterfly Effect" by Travis Scott, "Back on Road" by Gucci Mane, "Nice for What" by Drake, and "Motorsport" by the Migos. He is best known for his guest appearance alongside Nicki Minaj on 6ix9ine's 2018 single "Fefe", which peaked at number three on both the Canadian Hot 100 and US Billboard Hot 100.

Lindstrom signed with Interscope Records to release his 2019 debut single, "Shopping Spree" (featuring Lil Pump and Sheck Wes). He has also released collaborative singles or mixtapes with artists including Smokepurpp, MadeinTYO, 24hrs, G Herbo, and PnB Rock, among others. His producer tag utters "Murda on the beat so it's not nice!", for which he is frequently recognized. He has also used a separate producer tag recorded by Jaye Neutron.

== Early life and career ==
Lindstrom was born to Susi and Lee Lindstrom and raised in Fort Erie, Ontario, near Buffalo in a musical household and played drums as a child. Lindstrom is of Hungarian, English, and Swedish descent. He began producing beats at age 17 while he was still in high school using FL Studio after leaving his drumset at his friend's house. He chose his stage name "Murda Beatz" to promote his music on YouTube. When he turned 18, he moved to Chicago, and later worked with established stars such as Chief Keef and Lil Durk. Lindstrom stated that he met most of his early artists through social media and mutual friends. Eventually, he connected with Atlanta rap group Migos and moved in with them to start producing their music.

Lindstrom is notable for being a lead or featured artist on some of the tracks he produces, similarly to DJ Khaled, Mustard, or Mike Will Made It. He made the decision to transition to a "producer-artist," as Billboard describes it, in order to have more control and release music on his own timeline, instead of being dependent on the artists in the song. He released his first mixtape, Keep God First, in December 2016. He opened for G-Eazy's tour in the summer of 2018. His first single as a lead artist, "Shopping Spree," was released in 2019 with Lil Pump and Sheck Wes. He released his second single, "Banana Split," which features YNW Melly and Lil Durk, in March 2020. In March 2020, he confirmed the title of his debut album to be Murda She Wrote, with an initial release date of June 2020, on which it failed to release.

In 2019, Lindstrom created his own record imprint, Murda Beatz Recordings, and signed singer Adam Halliday.

In 2021, Lindstrom was honored in the Forbes 30 Under 30 listing under the music category.

== Personal life ==
By June 2022, Lindstrom began dating Brazilian singer Anitta, although they broke up two months later.

== Discography ==
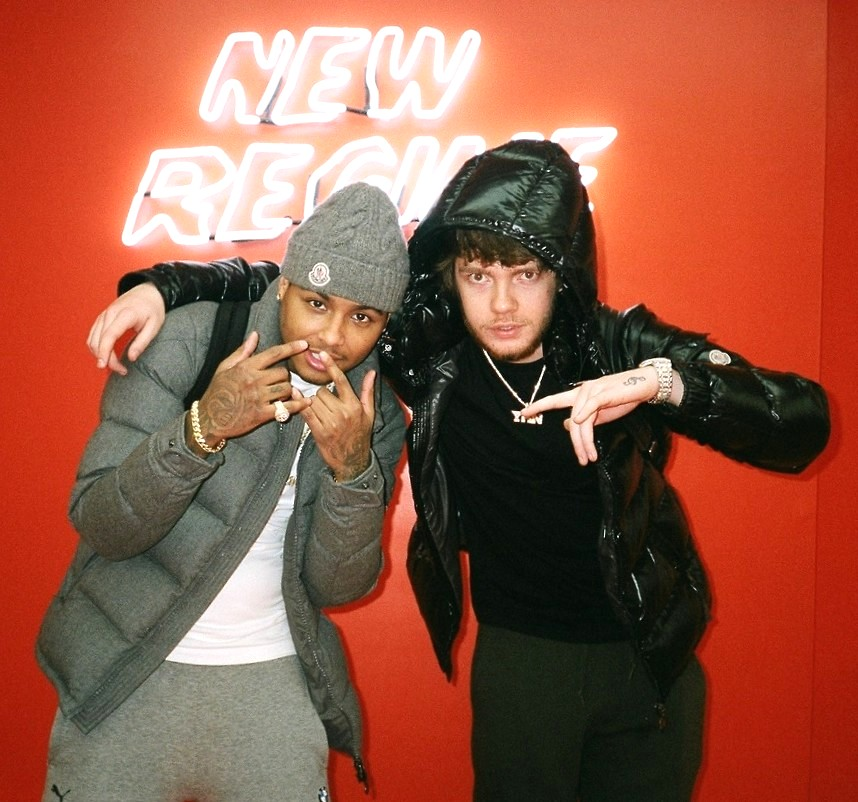
Jay Whiss and Murda Beatz, in 2021

=== Mixtapes ===
List of mixtapes, with selected details
Title	Album details	Peak chart positions			
Title	Album details	CAN	US	US R&B /HH	US Rap
Keep God First	Released: December 10, 2016; Label: Self-released; Formats: Digital download, streaming	—	—	—	—
Bless Yo Trap (with Smokepurpp)	Released: April 13, 2018; Label: Alamo, Interscope, Cactus Jack; Formats: Digital download, streaming	30	40	22	17
Memory Lane (with Shordie Shordie)	Released: February 26, 2021; Label: Warner; Formats: Digital download, streaming	—	—	—	—
Memory Lane 2 (with Shordie Shordie)	Released: October 27, 2023; Label: Warner; Formats: Digital download, streaming	—	—	—	—

=== Charted and certified singles ===
==== As lead artist ====
Title	Year	Peak chart positions	Certifications	Album
Title	Year	US Bub.	Certifications	Album
"123" (with Smokepurpp)	2018	19		Bless Yo Trap
"Do Not Disturb" (with Smokepurpp featuring Offset and Lil Yachty)	2018	—	RIAA: Gold	Bless Yo Trap
"No Más" (featuring Quavo, J Balvin, Anitta and Pharrell Williams)	2022	—		Non-album single

==== As featured artist ====
Title	Year	Peak chart positions							Certifications	Album
Title	Year	CAN	AUS	GER	IRE	UK	US	US R&B/HH	Certifications	Album
"Fefe" (6ix9ine featuring Nicki Minaj and Murda Beatz)	2018	3	8	16	21	17	3	3	MC: Platinum; RIAA: 8× Platinum; BPI: Gold; GLF: Platinum; IFPI DEN: Gold; IFPI NOR: Gold; RMNZ: 2× Platinum	Dummy Boy
"Groceries" (Chance the Rapper featuring TisaKorean and Murda Beatz)	2019	—	—	—	—	—	— (Note: "Groceries" did not enter the Billboard Hot 100, but peaked at number nine on the Bubbling Under Hot 100 chart.)	—		Non-album single

== Production discography ==
=== Singles produced ===
List of single as a record producer, with selected chart positions and certifications, showing year released, performing artists and album name
Title	Year	Peak chart positions										Certifications	Album
Title	Year	CAN	AUS	AUT	FRA	GER	NZ	SWI	US	US R&B /HH	US Rap	Certifications	Album
"Pipe It Up" (Migos)	2015	—	—	—	—	—	—	—	— (Note: "Pipe It Up" did not enter the Billboard Hot 100, but peaked at number six on the Bubbling Under Hot 100 chart.)	38	—		Yung Rich Nation
"Back on Road" (Gucci Mane and Drake)	2016	—	—	—	—	—	—	—	81	28	—	RIAA: Gold	Everybody Looking
"No Shopping" (French Montana featuring Drake)	2016	25	—	—	—	—	—	—	36	12	8	RIAA: Platinum	MC4
"Stutter" (Gucci Mane)	2016	—	—	—	—	—	—	—	—	—	—		The Return of East Atlanta Santa
"Drugs" (August Alsina)	2017	—	—	—	—	—	—	—	—	—	—		Non-album single
"It's a Vibe" (2 Chainz featuring Ty Dolla Sign, Trey Songz and Jhené Aiko)	2017	81	—	—	—	—	—	—	44	20	—	RIAA: 4× Platinum	Pretty Girls Like Trap Music
"No Frauds" (Nicki Minaj, Drake and Lil Wayne)	2017	25	58	73	43	—	—	50	14	8	—		Non-album singles
"Still Got Time" (Zayn featuring PartyNextDoor)	2017	22	20	41	36	—	—	34	66	—	—	ARIA: Platinum	Non-album singles
"Portland" (Drake featuring Quavo and Travis Scott)	2017	6	—	64	119	77	38	31	9	6	3	RIAA: 2× Platinum	More Life
"Butterfly Effect" (Travis Scott)	2017	40	46	—	—	—	—	58	50	17	12	RIAA: 4× Platinum; ARIA: Platinum	Astroworld
"Get Mine" (G-Eazy featuring Snoop Dogg)	2017	—	—	—	—	—	—	—	—	—	—		Non-album single
"4 AM" (2 Chainz featuring Travis Scott)	2017	—	—	—	—	—	—	—	55	24	—	RIAA: 2× Platinum	Pretty Girls Like Trap Music
"Bloody Hands" (Murda Beatz featuring Pressa)	2017	—	—	—	—	—	—	—	—	—	—		Non-album singles
"They Said It" (Ace Hood)	2017	—	—	—	—	—	—	—	—	—	—		Non-album singles
"Can't Hang" (Preme featuring PartyNextDoor)	2017	—	—	—	—	—	—	—	—	—	—		Light of Day
"MotorSport" (Migos, Nicki Minaj and Cardi B)	2017	12	74	—	73	—	—	54	6	3	3	RIAA: 3× Platinum; ARIA: Platinum; MC: 3× Platinum	Culture II
"Nice for What" (Drake)	2018	1	1	6	28	9	1	7	1	1	1	RIAA: 5× Platinum; ARIA: Platinum; MC: 4× Platinum	Scorpion
"Bigger Than You" (2 Chainz featuring Quavo and Drake)	2018	—	—	—	—	—	—	—	53	28	24	RIAA: Platinum	Non-album single
"Fefe" (6ix9ine featuring Nicki Minaj and Murda Beatz)	2018	3	8	14	49	16	3	10	3	3	3	MC: Platinum; RIAA: 8× Platinum	Dummy Boy
"More Than That" (Lauren Jauregui)	2019	—	—	—	—	—	—	—	—	—	—		TBA
"Next" (Ufo361 featuring Rin)	2019	—	—	2	—	3	—	10	—	—	—		Wave
"Doors Unlocked" (Murda Beatz featuring Polo G and Ty Dolla Sign)	2020	—	—	—	—	—	—	—	—	—	—		Non-album singles
"Oh No (Madden NFL Version)" (BRS Kash)	2021	—	—	—	—	—	—	—	—	—	—		Non-album singles
"—" denotes a recording that did not chart or was not released in that territory.

=== Other charted songs ===
Title	Year	Peak chart positions			Certifications	Album
Title	Year	US	US R&B	US Rap	Certifications	Album
"Just for Tonight" (Migos featuring Chris Brown)	2015	— (Note: "Just for Tonight" did not enter the Billboard Hot 100, but peaked at number fifteen on the Bubbling Under Hot 100 chart.)	—	—		Yung Rich Nation
"With You" (Drake featuring PartyNextDoor)	2016	47	21	8	RIAA: Platinum; BPI: Silver	Views
"Sweet Sweet" (Travis Scott)	2016	—	— (Note: "Sweet Sweet" did not enter the Hot R&B/Hip-Hop Songs chart, but peaked at number six on the Bubbling Under R&B/Hip-Hop Singles chart.)	—	MC: Gold	Birds in the Trap Sing McKnight
"Outside" (Travis Scott featuring 21 Savage)	2016	—	— (Note: "Outside" did not enter the Hot R&B/Hip-Hop Songs chart, but peaked at number five on the Bubbling Under R&B/Hip-Hop Singles chart.)	—	MC: Gold	Birds in the Trap Sing McKnight
"Get Right Witcha" (Migos)	2017	72	23	19	RIAA: Gold	Culture
"No Long Talk" (Drake featuring Giggs)	2017	40	22	14	BPI: Silver	More Life
"I Do" (Cardi B featuring SZA)	2018	23	16	12	RIAA: Platinum	Invasion of Privacy
"Motive" (Ariana Grande featuring Doja Cat)	2020	32	—	—		Positions
"Have Mercy" (Chlöe)	2021	28	13	—	RIAA: Gold	
"—" denotes a recording that did not chart or was not released in that territory.

== Production credits ==
=== 2014 ===
Migos - No Label 2

- 02. "Copy Me"
- 06. "Antidote" (produced with Phenom da Don)
- 17. "Body Parts" (featuring Machine Gun Kelly)
- 19. "Emmitt Smith"

Lil Durk - Signed to the Streets 2

- 02. "Ten Four"
- 13. "Gas & Mud"

Migos - Rich Nigga Timeline

- 03. "Can't Believe It"
- 11. "Story I Tell"

=== 2015 ===
Migos - Yung Rich Nation

- 04. "Spray the Champagne" (produced with Honorable C.N.O.T.E.)
- 08. "Just for Tonight" (featuring Chris Brown)
- 09. "Pipe it Up"
- 11. "Playa Playa"
- 12. "Cocaina" (featuring Young Thug)

Migos - Back to the Bando

- 05. "Rich Nigga Trappin"

Freddie Gibbs - Shadow of a Doubt

- 07. "Mexico" (featuring Tory Lanez) (produced with Speakerbomb)

Jeremih - Late Nights

- 09. "I Did" (featuring Feather) (produced with Jeremih and Left Lane)

=== 2016 ===
Migos - YRN 2

- 11. "Hoe On A Mission"
- 13. "Hate It Or Love It"

Drake - Views

- 08. "With You" (featuring PartyNextDoor) (background vocals from Jeremih) (produced with Nineteen85 and Cardiak)

Roy Woods - Waking at Dawn

- 06. "Switch" (produced with FrancisGotHeat and Sunny Diamonds)
- 08. "Why"

Travis Scott - Birds in the Trap Sing McKnight

- 07. "Sweet Sweet" (produced with Cubeatz and Mike Dean)
- 08. "Outside" (featuring 21 Savage) (produced with OZ, Nisi, and Mike Dean)

24hrs - 12:AM

- 01. "Gucci Flame / 12:AM in the 6
- 02. "Twenty Revenge" (featuring Yo Gotti) (produced with Apex Martin)
- 03. "Monster Truck" (produced with Cubeatz)
- 04. "Jungle Gym"

Kid Ink - RSS2

- 02. "Before the Checks" (featuring Casey Veggies) (produced with Cubeatz)
- 07. "Die in It" (produced with OZ)

PartyNextDoor and Jeremih

- 01. "Like Dat" (featuring Lil Wayne) (produced with Cubeatz)

Quavo

- 00. "Cuffed Up" (featuring PartyNextDoor)
- 00. "My Pockets"

PartyNextDoor

- 00. "Buzzin" (featuring Lil Yachty) (produced with Cubeatz)
- 00. "Can't Let The Summer Pass"

Rick Ross

- 00. "No U-Turns" (produced with Cubeatz)

Meek Mill - DC4

- 09. "Offended" (featuring Young Thug and 21 Savage) (produced with OZ and Cubeatz)

O.T. Genasis - Coke N Butter

- 04. "Feelings" (produced with Zaytoven and OG Parker)

Murda Beatz - Keep God First

- 01. "Intro"
- 02. "M&Ms" (featuring Offset and Blac Youngsta)
- 03. "Scorin'" (featuring Playboi Carti and Offset)
- 04. "More" (featuring PartyNextDoor and Quavo) (produced with Cubeatz)
- 05. "Yacht Master" (featuring Swae Lee and 2 Chainz)
- 06. "Novacane"
- 07. "She The Truth" (featuring Jeremih and Quavo) (produced with RetroFuture)
- 08. "Drop Out" (featuring Jimmy Prime)
- 09. "Growth" (featuring Offset)
- 10. "Cappin' N Shit" (featuring Skooly and 2 Chainz)
- 11. "Brown Money" (featuring Jay Whiss) (produced with OZ and Cubeatz)
- 12. "9 Times Out of 10" (featuring Ty Dolla Sign) (produced with Cubeatz)
- 13. "Pop Off" (featuring Offset)
- 14. "Hunnids" (featuring Smoke Dawg)
- 15. "I Just" (featuring Quavo)
- 16. "Roller Coasters" (featuring 24hrs) (produced with Rex Kudo)

Young Thug

- 00. "I Might" (featuring 21 Savage) (produced with Cubeatz)

Gucci Mane - The Return of East Atlanta Santa

- 08. "Yet" (produced with Cubeatz)

=== 2017 ===
PnB Rock - GTTM: Goin Thru the Motions

- 14. "Stand Back" (featuring A Boogie wit da Hoodie)

Migos - Culture

- 05. "Get Right Witcha" (produced with Zaytoven)

Wifisfuneral - When Hell Falls

- 05. "Hunnits, Fifties" (featuring Yung Bans) (produced with Cubeatz)

Various Artists – The Fate of the Furious: The Album

- 02. "Go Off" (performed by Lil Uzi Vert, Quavo and Travis Scott) (produced with Breyan Isaac and The Featherstones)

Drake – More Life

- 02. "No Long Talk" (featuring Giggs) (produced with Cubeatz)
- 11. "Portland" (featuring Travis Scott and Quavo) (produced with Cubeatz)

Kid Ink – 7 Series

- 01. "Supersoaka" (produced with OZ and Cubeatz)

Meek Mill - Meekend Music

- 02. "Backboard" (featuring Young Thug) (produced with Maaly Raw)

G-Dragon - Kwon Ji Yong

- 05. "Outro. 신곡(神曲) (Divina Commedia)" (produced with Brian Lee and Frank Dukes)

Juicy J - Gas Face

- 09. "Leanin" (featuring Chris Brown and Quavo) (produced with Cubeatz)

French Montana - Jungle Rules

- 11. "Push Up" (produced with Cubeatz)

Tyga - BitchImTheShit2

- 07. "Bel Air" (featuring Quavo) (produced with Crakwav)

Aminé - Good for You

- 02. "Yellow" (featuring Nelly) produced with Metro Boomin and Frank Dukes)

Bebe Rexha - All Your Fault: Pt. 2

- 01. "That's It" (featuring Gucci Mane and 2 Chainz) (produced with Cubeatz)

Kodak Black - Project Baby 2: All Grown Up

- 8: "Unexplainable" (produced with River Tiber, Ging)
- 12: Built My Legacy (featuring Offset) (produced with Ging)

Mozzy - 1 Up Top Ahk

- 10. "Outside" (featuring Lil Durk, Dave East and Lex Aura)

Quentin Miller

- 00. "Unexplained Freestyle"

A Boogie wit da Hoodie - The Bigger Artist

- 02. "Undefeated" (featuring 21 Savage) (produced with Illmind)

Gucci Mane - Mr. Davis

- 01. "Work in Progress (Intro)" (produced with Cubeatz)

Yo Gotti - I Still Am

- 09. "One on One" (featuring YFN Lucci and Meek Mill) (background vocals from Desiigner)
- 11. "Yellow Tape" (featuring 21 Savage) (produced with Rasool Diaz)

Roy Woods - Say Less

- 04. "Take Time" (featuring 24hrs) (produced with Charlie Handsome)

Juicy J - Rubba Band Business

- 07. "Too Many" (featuring Wiz Khalifa and Denzel Curry)

G-Eazy - The Beautiful & Damned

- 11. "Gotdamn" (produced with OZ)

Travis Scott and Quavo – Huncho Jack, Jack Huncho

- 03. "Eye 2 Eye" (featuring Takeoff) (produced with Felix Leone)
- 05. "Huncho Jack" (produced with Mike Dean, Quavo, and Illmind)
- 06. "Saint" (produced with Illmind)

=== 2018 ===
Prime Boys – Koba World

- 03. "Come Wit It"
- 04. "Street Dreams"(produced with Smokescreen)
- 05. "Tinted"
- 06. "So What"
- 09. "Hold Me Down"

Migos – Culture II

- 11. "Gang Gang" (produced with The Arcade)
- 15. "Beast"
- 17. "Motorsport" (featuring Cardi B and Nicki Minaj) (produced with Cubeatz)

Nipsey Hussle – Victory Lap

- 11. "Grinding All My Life" (produced with Mike & Keys)

Cardi B - Invasion of Privacy

- 13. "I Do" (featuring SZA) (produced with Cubeatz)

Smokepurpp and Murda Beatz – Bless Yo Trap

- 01. "123" (produced with Rasool Diaz)
- 02. "Big Dope" (produced with OZ)
- 03. "Do Not Disturb" (featuring Lil Yachty and Offset) (produced with Rasool Diaz)
- 04. "Pockets" (produced with Felix Leone)
- 05. "Good Habits"
- 06. "Mayo" (produced with Rasool Diaz)
- 07. "Pray" (featuring ASAP Ferg)
- 08. "Bumblebee" (produced with Frank Dukes and Rasool Diaz)
- 09. "Ways" (produced with Cubeatz)
- 10. "For the Gang" (produced with Cubeatz)

Nicki Minaj - Queen

- 17. "Miami"

6ix9ine – Dummy Boy

- 02. "Fefe" featuring Nicki Minaj & Murda Beatz
- 05. "Mama" featuring Nicki Minaj and Kanye West

Ski Mask The Slump God - Stokeley

- 08. "Far Gone" (featuring Lil Baby) (produced with Sool Got Hits)

Trippie Redd - Life's a Trip

- 05. "Forever Ever" (featuring Young Thug and Reese Laflare) (produced with G Koop)

Kris Wu – Antares

- 02. "November Rain"

Drake

- Drake - "Nice for What"

=== 2020 ===
Ariana Grande – Positions

- 03. "Motive" (with Doja Cat)

Smoke Dawg — Struggle Before Glory

- 03. "Three of a Kind (ft. Jay Critch, Fredo)"
- 06. "Snow"
- 07. "No Discussion (ft. AJ Tracey)"
- 08. "These Games (ft. Jay Whiss, Safe)"

Lay Zhang – LIT

- 02. "玉 (Jade)"

Jay Whiss — Peace of Mind

- 01. "Don't Change on Me"
- 03. "Valet" (ft. Puffy L'z)
- 07. "Back Track"

=== 2021 ===
Ariana Grande – Positions (Deluxe)

- 16. "Test Drive"

BamBam – Ribbon

- 01. "Intro"
- 05. "Air'"

Chlöe – In Pieces

- 01. "Have Mercy"

=== 2022 ===
Murda Beatz - Non-album single

- Murda Beatz feat. Blxst & Wale - "One Shot"

Unc & Phew - Only Built for Infinity Links

- Quavo and Takeoff - "Tony Starks"
- Quavo and Takeoff - "HOTEL LOBBY"
- Quavo and Takeoff - "Look @ This "
- Quavo and Takeoff - "Mixy" (with Summer Walker)

=== 2023 ===
Ludmilla – Vilã

- 08. "Solteiras Shake" (with DJ Gabriel do Borel)

Quavo – Rocket Power

- 01. "Fueled Up" (with Kenny Beats)
- 08. "Wall to Wall" (with Pooh Beatz, Felix Leone and Jack Uriah)
- 17. "Rocket Power" (with Bnyx, Dez Wright and O'Neal)

Nicki Minaj - Pink Friday 2

- 04. Beep Beep

2024

BamBam - Bamesis

•05. "Thank You Come Again"
