= Tredwell =

Tredwell is an English surname. It was the 13,038th most common surname in the United Kingdom in 1998. Notable people with the name include

- Alice Tredwell (1823–1867), English railway contractor and photographer
- Alonzo Tredwell (born 2002), American baseball player
- Daniel M. Tredwell (1826–1921), American attorney, businessman, book collector, and author
- Gail Tredwell (born 1958), Australian author
- James Tredwell (born 1982), English cricketer
- Roger Tredwell (1885–1961), American diplomat
- Thomas Tredwell (1743–1831), American lawyer and politician from New York
- Triduana (also known as Tredwell), Scottish saint associated with the blind

== See also ==
- Treadwell (disambiguation), a variant spelling of the surname
- Merchant's House Museum, also known as the Seabury Tredwell House
