= Prime Boys =

Canadian hip hop collective

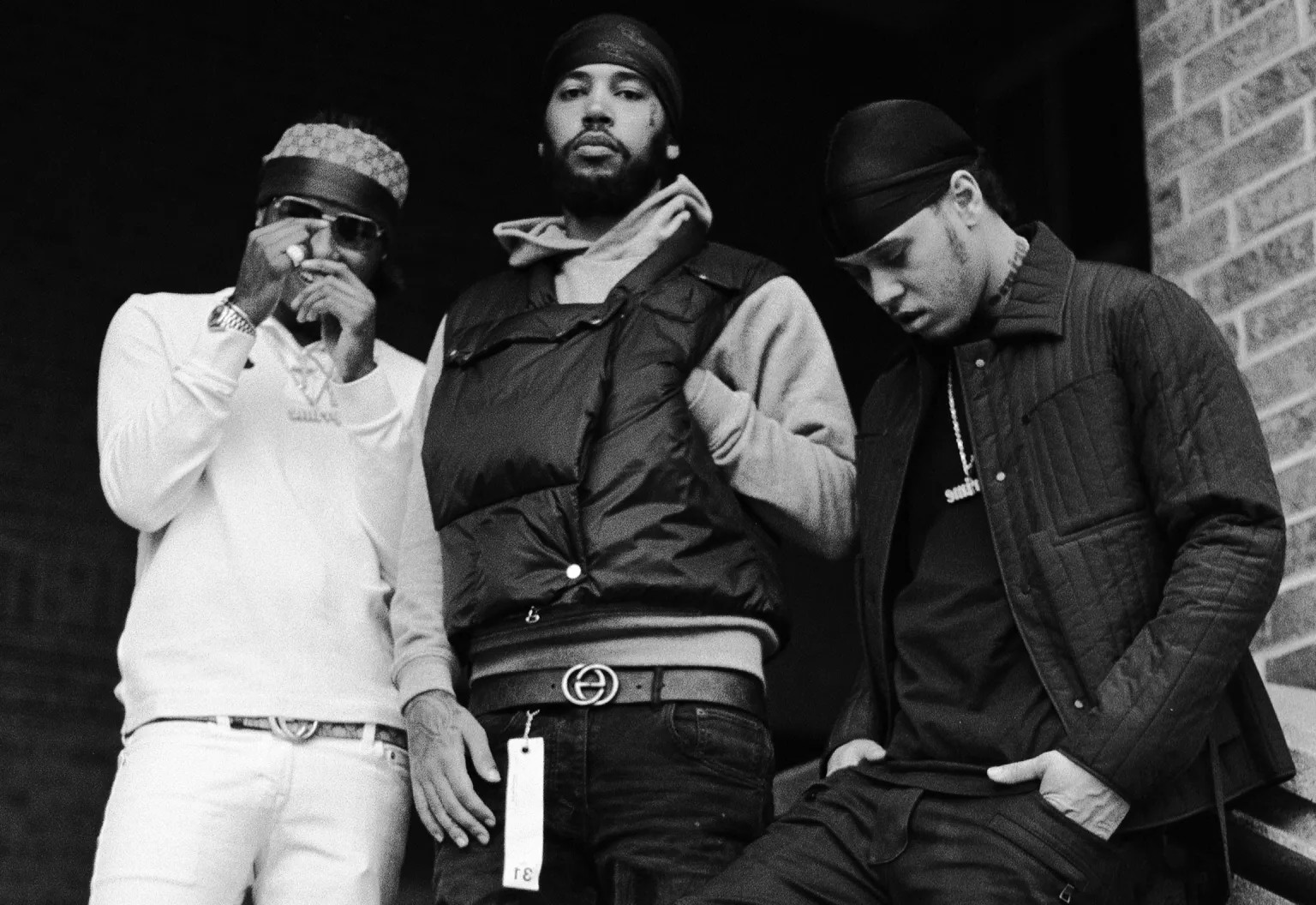
- Prime Boys in 2017. From left to right: Jay Whiss, Jimmy Prime, and Donnie.

Background information
- Origin: St. Lawrence, Toronto, Ontario, Canada
- Genre: Canadian hip hop
- Years active: 2012–2025
- Label: eOne
- Members: Jimmy Prime; Donnie
- Past members: Jay Whiss
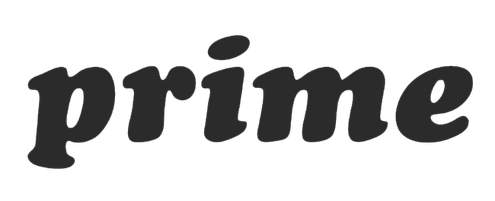

Prime Boys are a Canadian hip hop collective based in Toronto. The original lineup consisted of Jay Whiss, Jimmy Prime, and Donnie, and the trio released their debut studio album, Koba World, in 2018.

== Background ==
The trio all come from the Esplanade area in Toronto's central waterfront district that is popular with tourists, stating that they are showing the sides of the city tourists don't see with their music. It is said that Prime boys member, Jimmy, coined the term "The Six" as a nickname for Toronto, after its six boroughs and the area codes 416 and 647. A term that was taken global by Drake and even influenced the name of companies such as 6ixBuzz. Prime, Donnie and Whiss were all childhood friends who naturally formed into Prime Boys.

The group's single "Tinted", which was produced by Murda Beatz, was featured on Spotify's Northern Bars playlist.

The group released their debut studio album on July 27, 2018. The album was originally slated to be titled Prime Forever but was renamed to Koba World as a dedication to their best friend, Kosi Modekwe aka Koba Prime, who was killed earlier in the year with Halal Gang member Smoke Dawg. The album received a 9/10 score by Exclaim! and was heavily produced by Murda Beatz. It was supported by the singles "Hold Me Down," "Sopranos," "Tinted" and "Come Wit It". Jay Whiss and Jimmy Prime made an appearance on 6ixBuzz's second release NorthernSound released on December 13, 2019, alongside Halal Gang musician Safe on track 13 "The World is Yours".

Prime Boys also come together with all the Halal Gang members to form the hip hop supergroup "Full Circle". Jay Whiss released his debut studio album Peace of Mind on March 3, 2020. It contained features from Puffy L'z, and fellow Prime members Donnie and Jimmy Prime. It contained production from Toronto natives Murda Beatz, Richie Souf and CuBeatz.

In August 2025, Jimmy Prime announced on his social media account that Jay Whiss died in March 2025 due to complications with brain cancer. The family chose to keep the matter private during the time of his death, announcing it to the public 4 months later. As a result, the group has since been on indefinite hiatus, although they continue to release music under their individual aliases.

== Discography ==
=== Studio albums ===
- Koba World

=== Compilations ===
- Northern Sound (by 6ixBuzz)

== Filmography ==
Documentaries
Year	Title	Featuring	Notes
2017	6ix Rising	Jimmy Prime; Jay Whiss	Documentary showcasing Toronto's hip-hop, featuring numerous Canadian rap artists
2019	Remember Me, Toronto	Jay Whiss	Short film by Mustafa the Poet
