= The Esplanade (Toronto) =

East–west street in Toronto, Canada

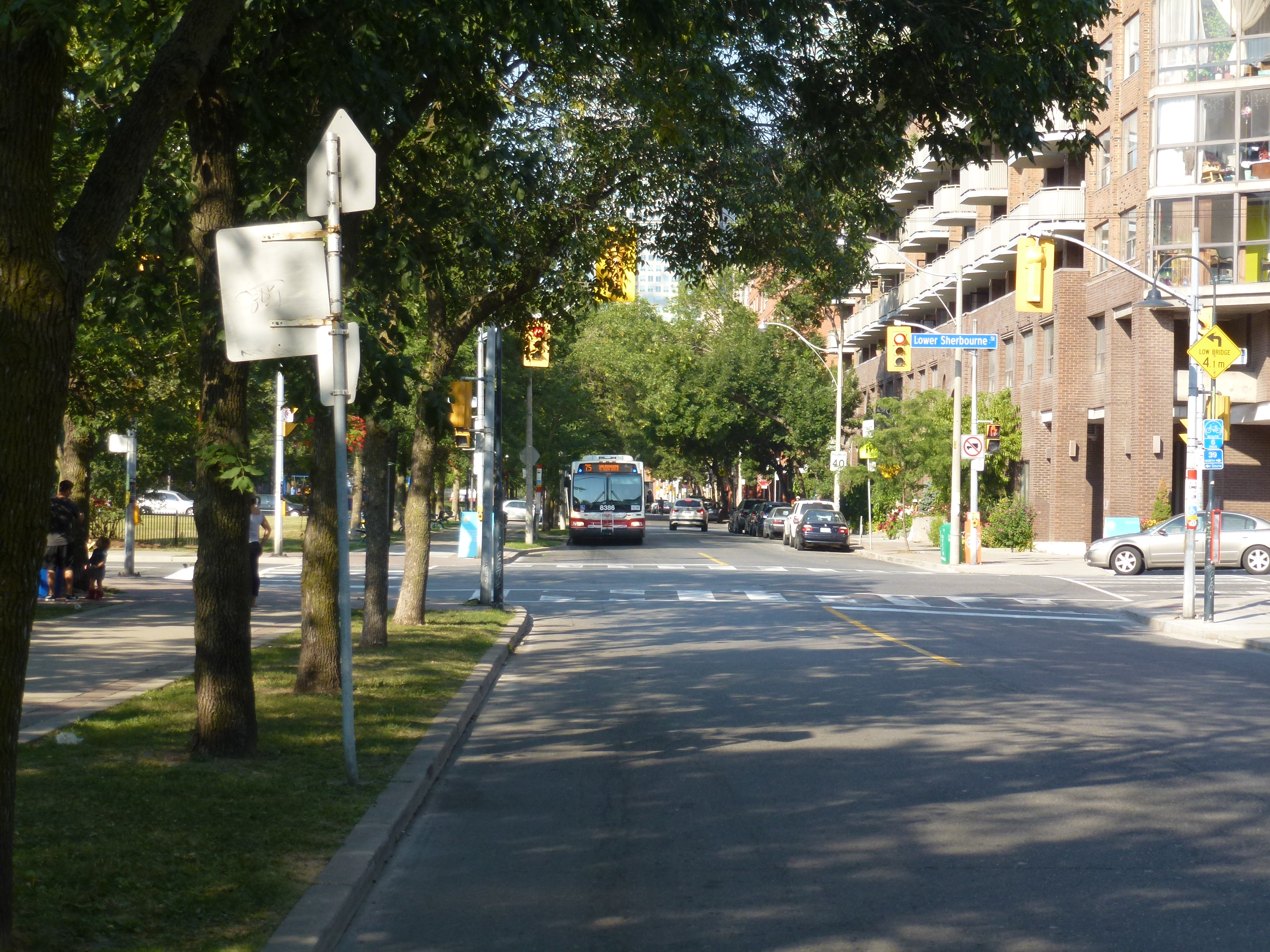
- The Esplanade at Lower Sherbourne Street
- Quarter: Downtown Toronto

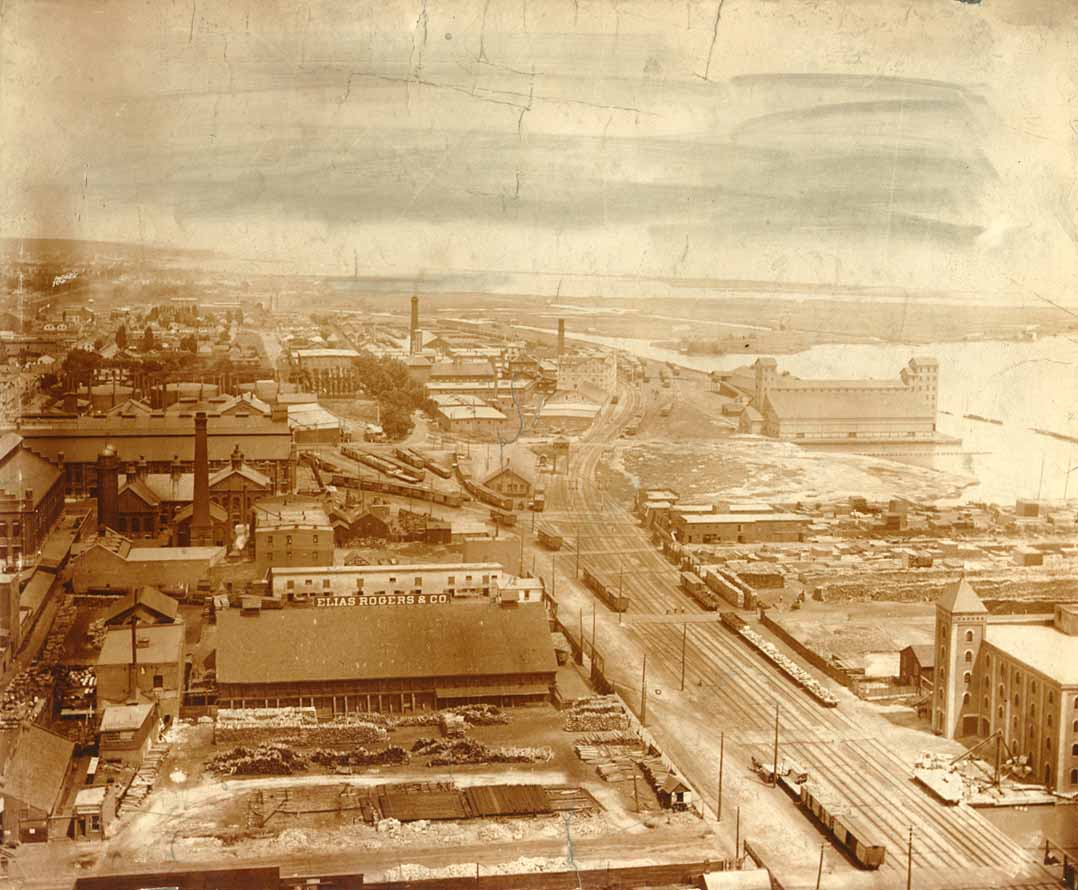
The Esplanade looking to the east near the distillery

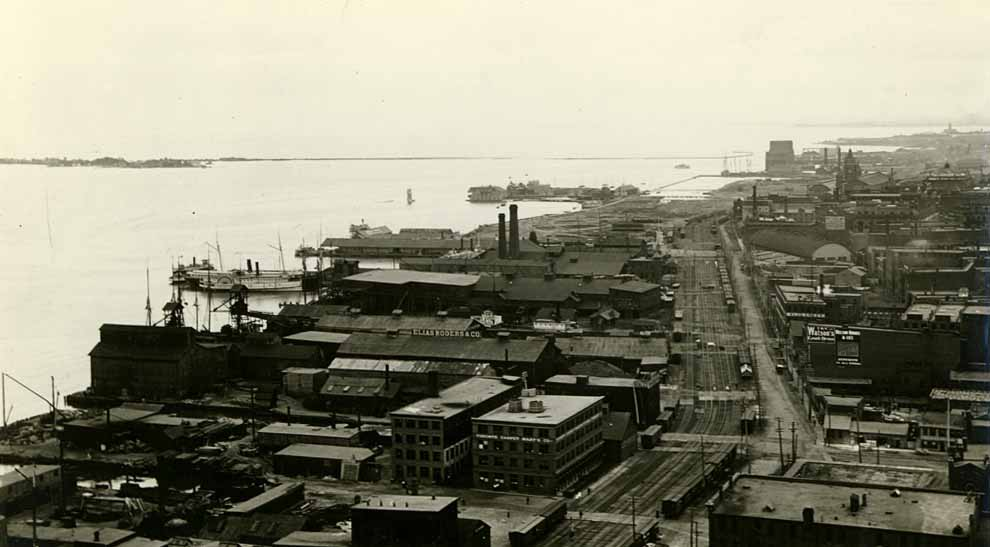
View of the Esplanade and railway right of way looking to the west, showing more landfill activities

The Esplanade is an east–west street along the central waterfront of Toronto, Ontario, Canada. This neighbourhood consists of generally low-rise and mid-rise housing – condominiums, public housing, cooperatives and some town homes between Jarvis and Parliament Streets south of Front Street. The stretch between Scott Street and Market Street is a popular restaurant area.

== History ==
Originally conceived as a city beautification project to clean up the city's waterfront in the 1850s, the street was taken over by the arrival of railways in Toronto in 1850. The railway eventually moved to an elevated viaduct, leaving only the eastern section of the street today. The area, east of Yonge Street, was dominated by industrial uses until the second half of the 20th century. As the harbour declined as a transfer point, the railway and industrial uses left the area. The Esplanade was redeveloped into a residential area, known as the "St. Lawrence Neighbourhood" in the late 1970s and early 1980s. In the blocks between Jarvis and Parliament, the southern part of the street (and the former rail tracks) were converted to a long strip of park and recreation space for the residents – David Crombie Park.

== Description ==
The Esplanade now begins as a two-lane street at Yonge Street, south of Front Street, north of the railway viaduct. To the north is the Meridian Hall with the L Tower condominium tower wedged in behind. Going east, both sides of the street are lined with late 20th-century or early 21st-century mid-rise and high-rise condominium projects. On the ground floors are numerous restaurants and retail stores. The north side of the street has a wide enough sidewalk that the restaurants have patios. Further to the east, along the north side, are older industrial buildings, such as the Greey's Toronto Mill Furnishing Works Factory at #70, which have been repurposed into commercial space. The street continues as a two-lane with wide north-side sidewalk east of Church Street as far west as Market Lane. Between here and Jarvis Street is the south building of St. Lawrence Market on the north side and the temporary location of the market's farmer's market building.

To the east of Jarvis, the Esplanade is primarily residential, and primarily low-rise. The street is a two-lane road, with most of the old right-of-way dedicated to David Crombie Park, a large linear park along the south side. On the south side of the park is the St. Lawrence housing development. Along the north side are various late 20th-century low-rise apartment projects. The St. Lawrence Recreation Centre is located along the north side of the street, east of Sherbourne, next to Market Lane Public School. This street form continues east to Berkeley Street, one block west of Parliament Street. On the northwest corner is the Berkeley Castle, the former 1871 Toronto Knitting & Yarn Factory, repurposed as commercial space.

TTC route 121 Esplanade–River operates along the full length of the road.

== History ==
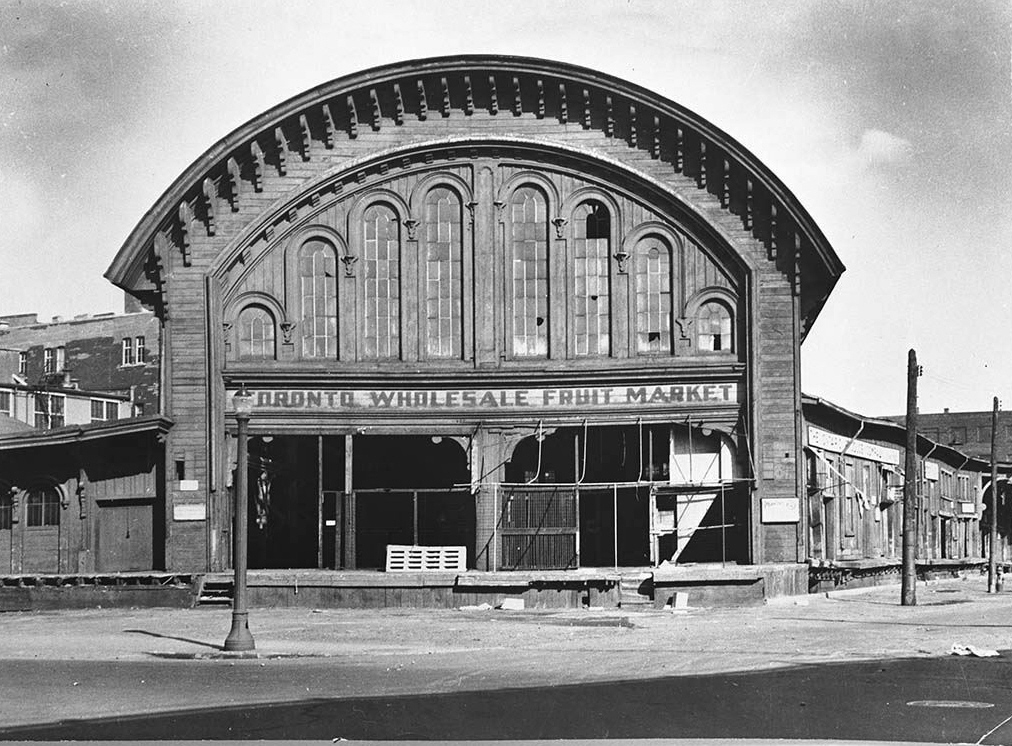
View of Wholesale Fruit Market, former GWR rail station

In the 1840s, Toronto's waterfront was a combination of wharves and squatter buildings. The area where the Esplanade is today was then part of the harbour, south of the shoreline. The Esplanade, a 30-metre-wide (100 ft) road, was proposed just south of Front Street, with new water lots made from cribbing and filling of the shore to the south. The waterfront was extended to a survey line from the point of the Gooderham windmill west to a point due east of the old Fort Rouillé. The new Esplanade was built in the 1850s at a cost of £150,000. Ostensibly for carriages and carts, the roadway eventually became primarily the route for rail lines in the central core. In exchange for 12 metres (40 ft) of the Esplanade, the railways underwrote the infilling of the harbour. The Esplanade and infill project was complete by 1865. The project was the start of the railways taking over the entire Esplanade to the west of Yonge Street and almost all of the harbour area. Gates were added to hold traffic as trains ran past each intersection.

The Grand Trunk Railway built its first station at Bay Street and the Esplanade before building the first Union Station at York Street and the Esplanade. Union Station would be replaced by a new Union Station in 1873 at the same location. The current Union Station was built in the 1910s and 1920s, and a new viaduct took over the railway functions of the Esplanade permanently. By then, landfill had extended the waterline further south. The Esplanade once ran west from Yonge Street to Spadina Avenue with the rest lost to re-development: Metro Toronto Convention Centre from John Street to Lower Simcoe Street; SkyWalk from Lower Simcoe Street to York Street (former CNCP Building and Canadian National Express Building and partially by old Union Station); Union Station built over the section from Bay Street to York Street; Union Station Bus Terminal (previous CP Express and Transport Building) covers area from Yonge to Bay and uses old sections of the road as an internal roadway for buses. A new section of the Esplanade West (west of Bay Street to Spadina) emerged in the 1990s but was renamed as Bremner Boulevard in honour of former Toronto Public Works Commissioner Ray Bremner. The portion of Bremner east of York Street was renamed Raptors Way in 2019.

The Great Western Railway built its rail station at the intersection of Yonge Street and the Esplanade. After the viaduct was built and passenger rail operations moved to Union Station to the west, the building was converted to a freight office, then to the Toronto Wholesale Fruit Market. The location became part of the site for the new O'Keefe Centre for the Performing Arts (now the Sony Centre) in 1960. The fruit market and the wholesale market west of the St. Lawrence Market moved out of downtown to the Ontario Food Terminal by the Humber River to the west.
