= Donnie E. Treadwell =

American politician

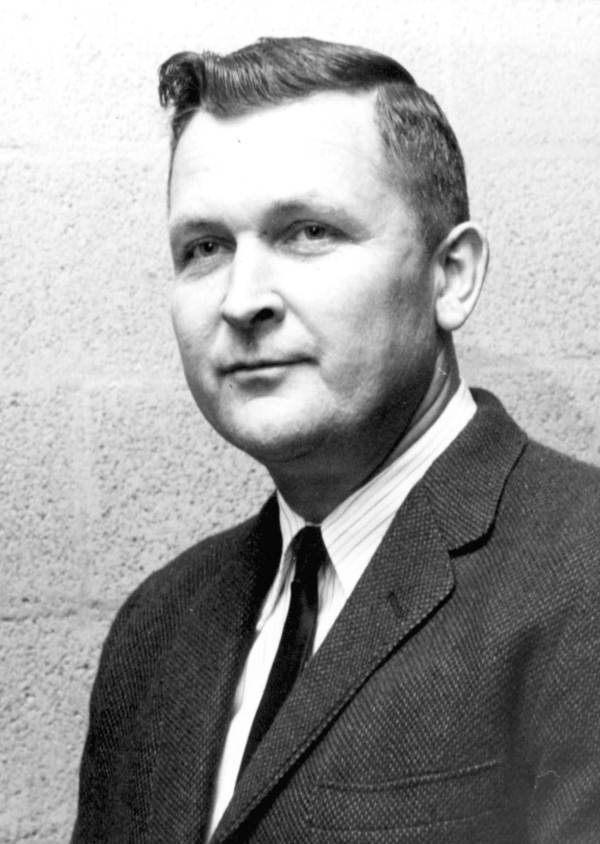
- Treadwell in 1965

Member of the Florida House of Representatives from Holmes County
- In office 1965–1966

Personal details
- Born: February 27, 1923 Holmes County, U.S.
- Died: October 12, 2014 (aged 91)
- Party: Democratic
- Spouse: Margaret Treadwell
- Children: 3
- Education: University of Florida

Donnie E. Treadwell (February 27, 1923 – October 12, 2014) was an American politician. He served as a Democratic member of the Florida House of Representatives.

== Life and career ==
Treadwell was born in Holmes County. He attended the University of Florida.

In 1965, Treadwell was elected to the Florida House of Representatives, serving until 1966.

Treadwell died in October 2014, at the age of 91.
