= Jimmy Prime =

Canadian rapper and producer (born 1992)

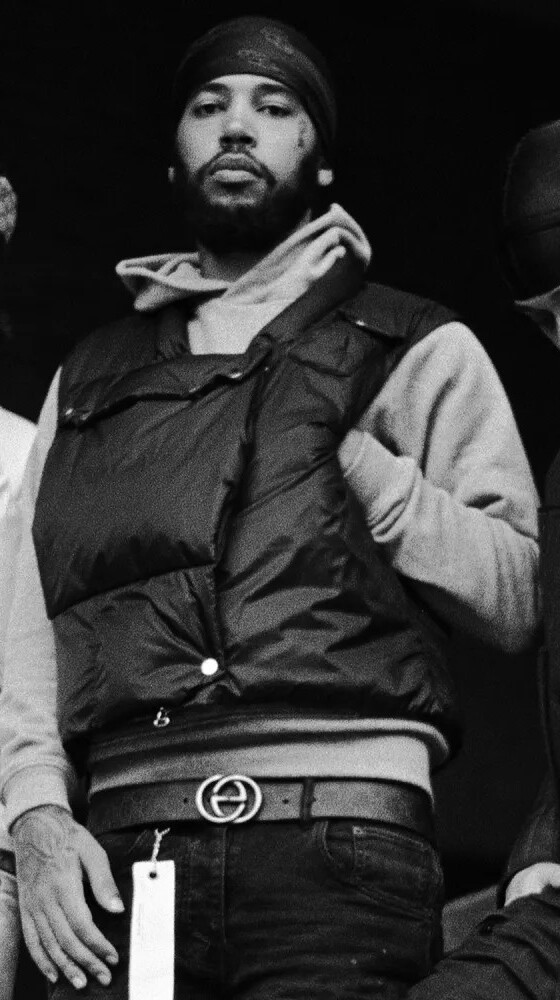

Background information
- Also known as: Jimmy Johnson
- Born: Gordon Phillips; May 14, 1992 (age 34)
- Origin: Toronto, Ontario, Canada
- Genre: Canadian hip hop
- Occupations: Rapper; singer
- Years active: 2013–present
- Labels: PRIME (2013-present); eOne (2017–2018)
- Member of: Prime Boys; Full Circle
- Website: www.jimmyprime.co

Gordon Edward Phillips III (born May 14, 1992), better known by his stage name Jimmy Prime, is a rapper from Toronto, Ontario, Canada. Jimmy is known for coining "The Six" as a nickname for Toronto and being the frontman of the hip hop group Prime Boys.

== Music career ==
=== 2012–2014: Beginnings ===
Alongside Prime Boys, they first attracted local attention from Toronto's St. Lawrence with numerous freestyles and mixtapes dropped in 2014. Prime Boys most prominent member at this time, Jimmy Prime, gained the group considerable attention for coining the nickname "The Six" for Toronto, a term that has been taken global by rappers such as Drake.

Jimmy Prime, under his former name "Jimmy Johnson", first found critical acclaim after his song "Pray" which was leaked onto OVO's blogs. This built hype for his debut mixtape In God We Trust, released in early 2014 and was entirely produced by Eric Dingus. It was rumoured he would sign to OVO Sound during this time. His second mixtape Red Ferrari was released through OVO Sound and the indie label PRIME, and again was entirely produced by Eric Dingus. The mixtape was caught by the eyes of numerous Toronto artists, including developing a strong friendship with producer Murda Beatz, who would go on to produce numerous tracks for the artist in the future.

=== 2015–2017: Block Boy and Bleeding Bull ===
In 2015, he co-produced the single "Now & Forever" on Drake's album If You're Reading This It's Too Late alongside Eric Dingus released in February 2015. This feature put Jimmy Prime into the mainstream and gain an international audience. Jimmy Prime released his third mixtape Block Boy in July 2015 which saw a feature from Whiss on the track "Best One". The release also prompted photoshoot by Vice in the following month which gained them attention on a national scale. In an interview with The Fader, Prime stated that "Block Boy to me is just more than me being from the hood. No matter where I go in this world, no matter how much money I make, no matter where I am at in my career, society will always consider me a block boy" in regards to the naming of the album.

In 2016, Prime was listed as number 7 in XXL's list of the Top 10 Canadian artists you should know. During this year, he made a guest appearance on Murda Beatz mixtape Keep God First with single "Drop Out". This set him up for his debut EP release, Bleeding Bull. The production duties on the 6 track EP were handled by STWO, Wonda Gurl, Murda Beatz and Arthur McArthur and was released on March 28, 2017. The EP received a 6/10 by Scott Glaysher of Exclaim!, who described the EP as "not [Jimmy Prime's] best work to date, but he's stayed true to his sound, something he holds dear."

=== 2018–2022: Koba World and EP ===
In January 2018, it was announced that he and the Prime Boys are working on their debut collaboration album due to be released sometime in the summer of 2018 initially titled Prime Forever. The following month, the group released the single "Tinted" produced by Murda Beatz marking it as the lead single of the upcoming album. The music video for the single was directed by Elliot Clancy Osberg and saw the group ride ATVs in the tundra on a frozen lake. The song went on to feature on Northern Bars as well as giving Prime Boys an influence to further their careers and promote Canada’s expanding hip-hop market. Clash conducted an interview on the Toronto Music Scene and published an article which portrays Toronto's rap underground on March 12, 2018. In the interview, Jimmy described Toronto as a city has so many famous artists in the city, but it’s not like they’re all blowing up. Full Circle affiliate, Smoke Dawg and Prime Boys assistant manager, Koba Prime were reportedly shot and killed on June 30, 2018, in an incident involving multiple victims. The death of Koba Prime influenced the change of Prime Boys upcoming album to Koba World as a tribute. Jimmy went on to say that "He always told us what was working, what was not. He's friends with all of us, we're all just like a family." The album was officially released on July 27, 2018, and was also supported by the singles "Hold Me Down" and "Sopranos". Jimmy Prime also participated in distributing exclusive Prime Boys merchandise on August 10, 2018, in a pop-up shop near St. Lawrence Market.

Prime made an appearance on 6ixBuzz's second release Northern Sound released on December 13, 2019, alongside Jay Whiss and Safe on track 13, "The World is Yours". Jimmy Prime released his first single of 2020 titled "Keep to Myself". The song was released on February 20 and was produced by Sticks and directed by Tunnel Vision He announced his debut album Blue Mercedes will be released soon after the release of his EP Incase we don't make it tomorrow which was released in June 2022.

== Discography ==
=== Studio albums ===
- TBA: Blue Mercedes

=== EPs ===
- 2013: In God We Trust
- 2014: Red Ferrari
- 2015: Block Boy
- 2017: Bleeding Bull
- 2022: Incase we don't make it to tomorrow

=== Prime Boys ===
- 2018: Koba World

== Filmography ==
Film
Year	Title	Role	Notes
2017	6IX RISING	Himself	Documentary showcasing Toronto's hip-hop featuring numerous Canadian rap artists.
