= Donald =

- Donald II of Scotland
- Pronunciation: /ˈdɒnəld/ DON-ald
- Gender: Male
- Language: English; Scottish Gaelic; Scots

Origin
- Origin: Domhnall; Dómhnall; Dòmhnall; Domhnull; Dòmhnull
- Derivation: Proto-Celtic *dumno-ualos
- Meaning: "ruler of the world"

Other names
- Nicknames: Don; Donnie; Donny
- Cognates: Domnall; Dónal; Donal; Donall; Donnell; Dolan; Dyfnwal; Dumnagual
- Related names: MacDonnell, Donaldson, MacDonald, MacDonell, Donnell, Donnelly

Donald is a Scottish masculine given name. It is derived from the Gaelic name Dòmhnall. This comes from the Proto-Celtic *Dumno-ualos ("world-ruler" or "world-wielder"). The final -d in Donald is partly derived from a misinterpretation of the Gaelic pronunciation by English speakers. A short form of Donald is Don, and pet forms of Donald include Donnie and Donny. The feminine given name Donella is derived from Donald.

Donald has cognates in other Celtic languages: Modern Irish Dónal (anglicised as Donal and Donall); Scottish Gaelic Dòmhnall, Domhnull and Dòmhnull; Welsh Dyfnwal and Cumbric Dumnagual. Although the feminine given name Donna is sometimes used as a feminine form of Donald, the names are not etymologically related.

== Variations ==
| Language | Spelling | Pronunciation |
|---|---|---|
| Old Irish | Domhnall | |
| Modern Irish | Dónal | |
| Hiberno-English | Donal | |
| Scottish English | Donald | |
| Scots | Donnald | |
| Irish | Dónall | [ˈd̪ˠoːnˠəl̪ˠ] |
| Manx Gaelic | Dolyn | [ˈdðolən] |
| Scottish Gaelic | Dòmhnall | [ˈt̪õːəl̪ˠ] |

== Kings and noblemen ==
Domnall or Domhnall is the name of many ancient and medieval Gaelic kings and noblemen:

- Dyfnwal Moelmud (Dunvallo Molmutius), legendary king of pre-Roman Britain
- Dyfnwal Hen (Dumnagual I), Ruler of Alt Clut (Strathclyde) (450–475)
- Domnall Brecc, king of Dál Riata (d. 642)
- Domnall mac Áedo, High King of the Northern Uí Néill and Ireland (d. 642)
- Domnall Midi, High King of Clann Cholmáin and Ireland (d. 763)
- Domnall mac Ailpín (812–863)
- Donald II of Scotland (889–900)
- Domnall mac Eimín, Mormaer of Mar (d. 1014)
- Donald III of Scotland (1033–1099)
- Domnall Gerrlámhach, King of Dublin (d. 1135)
- Domnall Ua Lochlainn, High King of Ireland (1083 and 1121)
- Domhnall I, Earl of Mar (1276–1301)
- Domhnall II, Earl of Mar (1305–1332)
- Domhnall, Earl of Lennox (1333–1365)
- Dyfnwal, King of Strathclyde (d. 908×915), also known by the names Donald, Domhnall, and Domnall
- Dyfnwal ab Owain (d. 975), also known by the names Donald and Domnall
- Owain ap Dyfnwal (fl. 934)

== People with the given name ==
=== Domhnall ===
- Domhnall mac Conchobair Ó Briain (died 1579), Gaelic Irish military leader
- Domhnall Gleeson (born 1983), Irish actor
- Domhnall mac Dáire Mac Bruaideadha (fl. c. 1600), Irish poet
- Domhnall MacAuley (born 1957), Scottish physician and professor
- Dòmhnall Ruadh Chorùna (1887–1967), Scottish Gaelic poet

=== Don ===
- Don Adams (1923–2005), American actor, comedian and director
- Don Airey (born 1948), English keyboardist
- Don Aker (born 1955), Canadian writer and educator
- Don Ameche (1908–1993), Hollywood actor
- Don Amero (born 1980), Canadian singer
- Don Barksdale (1923–1993), American basketball player
- Don Bertoia, Canadian middle-distance runner
- Don Black (baseball) (1916–1959), American baseball player
- Don Black (tennis) (1927–2000), Rhodesian tennis player
- Don Bluth (born 1937), animator, film director, and producer
- Don Bowman (singer) (1937–2013), American comedian, country music singer, and songwriter
- Don Callis (born 1963), Canadian professional wrestler, wrestling manager, and actor
- Don Cazayoux (born 1964), American lawyer and politician
- Don Chaffey (1917–1990), British film director, writer, producer, and art director
- Don Chard, Canadian politician
- Don Cheadle (born 1964), American actor and producer
- Don Cherry (born 1934), Canadian ice hockey player, coach, and television commentator
- Don Cherry (American football) (born 1994), American football player
- Don Cherry (singer) (1924–2018), American singer and golfer
- Don Cherry (trumpeter) (1936–1995), American jazz trumpeter
- Don R. Christensen (1916–2006), American animator, cartoonist, and writer
- Don Christopher (1934–2022), American farmer
- Don Ciccone (1946–2016), American singer-songwriter, member of the band The Critters
- Don Cornelius (1936–2012), American television show host and producer
- Don Cornell (1919–2004), stage name of Luigi Varlaro, American singer
- Dominick Don Costa (1925–1983), American conductor and record producer
- Don Covay (1936–2015), American singer and songwriter
- Don Criqui (born 1950), American sportscaster
- Don Diablo (born 1980), Dutch DJ, record producer, musician and songwriter of electronic music
- Don Digirolamo, American re-recording mixer
- Don Dokken (born 1953), American singer, lead singer of Dokken
- Don Drysdale (1936–1993), American baseball pitcher and sportscaster
- Don Dunstan (1926–1999), South Australian politician
- Don Estelle (1933–2003), British actor and singer
- Don Everly (1937–2021), American country-influenced rock and roll singer and guitarist
- Don Felder (born 1947), American singer-songwriter and guitarist, former member of the Eagles
- Don Finlay (1909–1970), British athlete and Royal Air Force officer
- Don Frye (born 1965), American mixed martial artist and professional wrestler
- Don Forsht, American politician
- Don Garber (born 1957), American sports executive
- Don Gardner (1931–2018), American singer-songwriter
- Don Gibson (1928–2003), American songwriter and country musician
- Don Gilman (1934–2005), American politician
- Don Goldstein (1937–2022), American basketball player
- Don Gorske (born 1953), Guinness World Record holder of most Big Mac hamburgers eaten
- Don Graham (racing driver) (1943–2016), American racing driver
- Don Gullett (born 1951), American baseball pitcher
- Don Gullick (1924–2000), Welsh rugby union and rugby league footballer and coach
- Don Hasselbeck (born 1955), American football player
- Don Henley (born 1947), founding member of the Eagles
- Don Herbert (1917–2007), television's "Mr. Wizard"
- Don Hewitt (1922–2009), American television news producer
- Don Ho (1930–2007), American pop musician, singer and entertainer
- Don Hutson (1913–1997), American football player
- Don Imus (1940–2019), American radio and television host
- Don Johnson (born 1949), American actor, producer and singer
- Don Johnson (basketball) (1930–2019), American basketball player and coach
- Don Johnson (sports executive) (1930–2012), Canadian sports executive
- Don King (boxing promoter) (born 1931), American boxing promoter
- Don King (coach) (born 1926), American football player and coach
- Don King (defensive back) (born 1964), American football player
- Don King (defensive lineman) (1929–2014), American football player
- Don King (musician) (born 1954), American singer, songwriter, guitarist, and trumpeter
- Don King (photographer) (born 1960), American photographer, cinematographer, and film director
- Don Roy King (born 1947), American television director
- Don Kirshner (1934–2011), American music publisher, rock music producer, talent manager, and songwriter
- Don Knotts (1924–2006), American actor and comedian
- Don Larsen (1929–2020), American baseball player
- Don Lemon (born 1966), American television personality and current host of CNN Tonight
- Don L. Lind (1930–2022), American scientist, U.S. Navy officer, naval aviator, and NASA astronaut
- Don MacLean (basketball) (born 1970), American basketball player and color commentator
- Don Marion Davis (1917–2020), American child actor
- Don Mattingly, American pro baseball player and manager
- Don McGowan (1938–2023), Canadian television personality
- Don McLean (born 1945), American singer-songwriter and musician
- Don Messick (1926–1997), American voice actor
- Don Muraco (born 1939), American professional wrestler
- Don Murray (1929–2024), American actor
- Don Nelson (born 1940), American basketball player and coach
- Don Nelson (screenwriter) (1927–2013), American screenwriter, film producer, and jazz musician
- Don Nickles (born 1948), American politician
- Don Noel (born 1929), American racing driver
- Don Omar (born 1978), Puerto Rican rapper, singer, songwriter, record producer and actor
- Don Paterson (born 1963), Scottish poet, writer and musician
- Don Patinkin (1922–1995), Israeli-American economist
- Don Payne, American writer and producer
- Don Puskarich (born 1939), American racing driver
- Don Quarrie (born 1951), Jamaican sprinter
- Don Reed (born 1959), American actor
- Don Reid (born 1945), lead singer of American country group The Statler Brothers
- Don Rickles (1926–2017), American stand-up comedian
- Don Robesky (1906–2002), American football player
- Don Robinson (1934–2025), British businessman and former wrestler
- Don Rondo (1930–2011), American singer
- Don Shula (1930–2020), American football coach
- Don Slater (born 1954), British sociologist
- Don Trahan (born 1949), American golfer, father of D. J. Trahan
- Don Van Vliet (1941–2010), American singer, songwriter and musician, known professionally as Captain Beefheart
- Don Warrington (born 1951), Trinidadian-born British actor
- Don Waterman (born 1950), American racing driver
- Don Webb (American football) (born 1939), American football player
- Don Webb (playwright), English playwright and dramatist
- Don Webb (writer) (born 1960), American science fiction, mystery, and horror writer
- Don Wilson (American football) (born 1961), American football player
- Don Wilson (announcer) (1900–1982), American radio and television announcer and actor
- Don Wilson (Australian footballer) (1914–2015), Australian footballer
- Don Wilson (baseball) (1945–1975), American baseball pitcher
- Don Wilson (cricketer) (1927–2012), English cricketer
- Don Wilson (pastor) (born 1949), American Christian pastor and creationist
- Don E. Wilson (born 1944), American zoologist
- Don M. Wilson III (born 1948), American banker and corporate director
- Don W. Wilson (born 1942), American historian and archivist
- Don Williams (1939–2017), American singer-songwriter
- Don Williams (guard) (1919–2001), American football player
- Don Williams (American football coach) (1927–2013), American football, track and field coach
- Don Williams (footballer, born 1935) (1935–1995), Australian rules footballer
- Don Williams (footballer, born 1939) (born 1939), Australian rules footballer
- Don Williams (poker player) (1942–2013), American poker player
- Don Williams (racing driver) (1947–1989), American racing driver
- Don Zewin (1952–2021), American professional poker player

=== Donal ===
- Donal Carey (1937–2025), Irish politician
- Donal Hord (1902–1966), American sculptor
- Donal Kelly (1938–2025), Irish journalist and broadcaster
- Donal Logue (born 1969), Canadian actor
- Donal MacIntyre (born 1966), Irish investigative reporter
- Donal Murray (bishop) (1940–2024), Roman Catholic Bishop of Limerick (1996–2009)
- Donal O'Brien (disambiguation), several individuals
- Donal O'Donoghue (1894–1971), Irish Fianna Fáil politician
- Donal O'Shea, Canadian mathematician
- Donal O'Sullivan (disambiguation), several individuals
- Donal Roe MacCarthy Mór (died 1302), 13th-century noble of Ireland
- Donal MacCarthy Reagh (1450/1460–1531), 9th Prince of Carbery (1505–1531)
- Donal Skehan (born 1986), Irish singer, television personality/presenter

=== Dónal ===
- Dónal Lunny (born 1947), Irish folk musician
- Dónal Óg Cusack (born 1977), Irish hurler

=== Donald ===
- Donald Alarie (born 1945), Canadian writer
- Donald Ardell (fl.1990s–2020s), American politician
- Donald Bailey (1934–2013), American jazz drummer
- Donald Bradman (1908–2001), Australian cricketer
- Donald Weldon Brann (1895–1945) American Major General
- Donald Brashear (born 1972), American ice hockey player
- Donald Burgess (born 1933), British track cyclist
- Donald Buttress, English architect
- Donald Byrd (1932–2013), American jazz and rhythm and blues trumpeter
- Donald Cameron (born 1954), Australian water polo player and coach
- Donald Campbell (1921–1967), British speed record breaker
- Donald M. Campbell Jr. (born 1955), retired commanding general of United States Army Europe
- Donald Capelle, Marshallese politician
- Donald C. Carlson (1929–2005), American politician
- Donald Chumley (born 1962), American football player
- Donald Crisp (1882–1974), English filmmaker
- Donald D. Deshler (born 1947), American educator
- Donald D'Alesio, American football coach
- Donald Dewar (1937–2000), Scottish statesman
- Donald Disney, Fellow of the Institute of Electrical and Electronics Engineers
- Donald Douglas, multiple people
- Donald Driver (born 1975), American football player
- Donald "Duck" Dunn (1941–2012), American bass guitarist
- Donald Fagen (born 1948), American musician
- Donald Faison (born 1974), American actor and comedian
- Donald Foss (1945–2022), American billionaire
- Donald Friese (born 1940), American billionaire
- Donald Henry Gaskins (1933–1991), American cannibalistic serial killer, rapist, and thief
- Donald Geisler (born 1978), Filipino taekwondo athlete
- Donald Gibb (born 1954), American actor
- Donald Glover (born 1983), American actor, musician, writer, comedian, and producer
- Donald Gordon (cricketer) (born 1990), English cricketer
- Donald J. Guter (born 1948), American lawyer and retired US Navy rear admiral
- Donald J. Harris (born 1938), Jamaican-American economist
- Donald Hawkins (born 1992), American football player
- Donald Harvey (1952–2017), American serial killer
- Donald Hewagama (1926–2009), Sri Lankan Sinhala Judge Advocate General
- Donald Hewlett (1922–2011), British actor
- Donald Hill-Eley (born 1969), American football coach and former player
- Donald Thomas Hornstein, American law professor
- Donald Izacus Panjaitan (1925–1965), Indonesian general
- Donald Izzett (born 1975), American man who has been missing since 1995
- Donald Eugene Fields II (born 1964), American criminal
- Donald Judd (1928–1994), American artist
- Donald Keating (1924–1995), British lawyer
- Donald Keene (1922–2019), American-Japanese literary scholar
- Donald E. Kelley (1908–1995), associate justice of the Colorado Supreme Court
- Donald P. Kent (1916–1972), American sociologist
- Donald Knuth (born 1938), American computer scientist
- Donald Woodward Lee (1910–1977), American philologist
- Donald Lippincott (1893-1962), American Olympic athlete
- Donald Maclean (spy) (1913–1983), British diplomat and Soviet spy
- Donald MacCormick (1939–2009), Scottish journalist
- Donald R. MacLeod (1902–1976), Canadian politician
- Donald Marmen, Canadian politician
- Donald Albert Marshall (born 1932), Canadian politician
- Donald McFarlane, British-American politician
- Donald R. McMonagle (born 1952), American astronaut
- Donald McQuade (1941–2025), American academic and writer
- Donald Moatshe (born 1985), South African musician
- Donald Mote (1900–1968), American judge
- Donald W. Munro (1916–1998), Canadian politician
- Donald Nicol (1843–1903), Scottish politician
- Donald Nicolaisen (1944–2019), American politician
- Donald Nixon (1914–1987), American businessman and brother of US president Richard Nixon
- Donald Obeyesekere (1888–1964), Sri Lankan Sinhala legislator
- Donald O'Connor (1925–2003), American dancer, singer, and actor
- Donald of Ogilvy (Saint Donald; fl. 8th century)
- Donald Parham (born 1997), American football player
- Donald Perera, 11th commander of the Sri Lanka Air Force
- Donald H. Peterson (1933–2018), United States Air Force colonel and astronaut
- Donald Pettit (born 1955), American chemical engineer and astronaut
- Donald Pleasence (1919–1995), English actor
- Donald E. Polkinghorne (1936–2018), American academic and psychologist
- Donald Ramotar (born 1950), 8th president of Guyana
- Donald Jasen Ranaweera (1921–2000), Sri Lankan Sinhala planter, press baron, and politician
- Donald Richie (1924–2013), American-born author
- Donald A. Ritchie (born 1945), Historian Emeritus of the United States Senate
- Donald "Buck Dharma" Roeser (born 1947), American musician, guitarist for Blue Öyster Cult
- Donald Rumsfeld (1932–2021), American businessman and government official
- Donald Sanford (born 1987), American-Israeli Olympic sprinter
- Donald Sild (born 1968), Estonian javelin thrower
- Donald "Deke" Slayton (1924–1993), American astronaut
- Donald Spero (born 1939), American world champion rower
- Donald Sterling (born 1934), American billionaire
- Donald Sutherland (1935–2024), Canadian actor
- Donald A. Thomas (born 1955), American engineer and astronaut
- Donald J. Trahan, Jr. (born 1980), American golfer
- Donald Triplett (1933–2023), first person to be diagnosed with autism
- Donald Trump (born 1946), President of the United States, businessman
- Donald Trump Jr. (born 1977), American businessman
- Donald Tsang (born 1944), former Hong Kong civil servant
- Donald Tusk (born 1957), Polish politician, Prime Minister of Poland, and then–President of the European Council
- Donald Wailan-Walalangi (born 1960), Indonesian tennis player
- Donald Watson (1910–2005), English animal rights advocate
- Donald W. Webber (1906–1995), justice of the Maine Supreme Judicial Court
- Donald Whiston (1927–2020), American ice hockey player
- Donald Whitton (1923–2018), Canadian cellist and teacher
- Donald E. Williams (1942–2016), United States Navy captain and astronaut
- Donald Williamson (disambiguation), multiple people
- Donald Wilson (disambiguation), multiple people
- Donald Young (tennis) (born 1989), American tennis player

=== Donaldo ===
- Donaldo Arza (born 1946), Panamanian track and field athlete
- Donaldo González (born 1971), Panamanian footballer
- Donaldo Hontiveros (born 1977), Filipino basketball player
- Donaldo Macedo (born 1950), American academic
- Donaldo Méndez (born 1978), Venezuelan baseball player
- Donaldo Morales (born 1982), Honduran footballer
- Donaldo Ortiz Colín (born 1961), Mexican politician
- Donaldo Ernesto Reyes (born 1939), Honduran lawyer and politician

=== Donnell ===
- Donnell Ballagh O'Cahan (died 1627), Irish landowner and rebel
- Donnell Rawlings (born 1968), comedian

== Fictional characters ==
- Donald the Scottish Twin, a fictional character from The Railway Series and its televised adaptation Thomas & Friends
- Donald Anderson, a character in the video game Bully
- Don the Beachcomber, stage name of Donn Beach, proprietor of a chain of tiki bars of the same name
- Donald Blake, the secret identity of The Mighty Thor, from Marvel Comics
- Donald Duck, Disney animated cartoon and comic-book character
- Donnie Darko, protagonist of a film of the same name
- Donald "Don" Draper, protagonist of the AMC television series Mad Men
- Donald "Ducky" Mallard, character in the TV show NCIS
- Donald Fisher, fictional character portrayed by Norman Coburn in Home and Away
- Don Flamenco, a fictional Spanish boxer from the Punch-Out!! series
- Donald Morden, fictional character from the video game series Metal Slug
- Sir Donald McDuck, Disney character who is an ancestor of Scrooge McDuck and Donald Duck
- Donald Pierce, a Marvel Comics super villain

== See also ==
- List of Irish-language given names
- List of Scottish Gaelic given names
- Clan Donald, one of the largest Scottish clans
- Donald (surname)
- Dumnorix
- Macdonald (name)
- The Donald (disambiguation)
