= Donald Wilson =

Donald or Don Wilson may refer to:

== Sportspeople ==
- Don Wilson (Australian footballer) (1914–2015), Australian footballer
- Don Wilson (footballer, born 1930) (1930–2003), English football player and manager, played for Bury FC
- Don Wilson (cricketer) (1937–2012), English cricketer
- Don Wilson (baseball) (1945–1975), Major League Baseball player for the Houston Astros
- Don Wilson (kickboxer) (born 1954), American actor and kickboxer, nicknamed "The Dragon"
- Don Wilson (gridiron football) (born 1961), gridiron football defensive back
- Donald Wilson (cyclist) (born 1944), Australian cyclist
- Donald Wilson (South African soccer), active in the 1940s

== Others ==
- Don Wilson (announcer) (1900–1982), American announcer and occasional actor in radio and television
- Don Wilson (Colorado politician), American politician
- Don W. Wilson (born 1942), former Archivist of the United States
- Don Wilson (musician) (1933–2022), musician with The Ventures
- Don M. Wilson III (born 1948), American banker and risk management specialist
- Don Wilson (pastor) (born 1949), founder and senior pastor of Christ's Church of the Valley in Peoria
- Don E. Wilson (born 1944), American zoologist
- Donald Wilson (general) (1892–1978), United States Army Air Forces general during World War II
- Donald Wilson (writer and producer) (1910–2002), British television writer and producer
- H. Donald Wilson (1923–2006), American founder of LexisNexis
- Donald R. Wilson (1917–1983), justice of the Supreme Court of Appeals of West Virginia
- Donald Roller Wilson (born 1938), American artist
- Donald Erwin Wilson (1932–2002), U.S. Navy admiral
- Donald Cumming Wilson (1898–1950), Scottish chemist
- J. Donald Wilson (1904–1984), radio and film writer, producer, and voice actor

== See also ==
- Don Willson (1913–1967), Canadian ice hockey player
