= Donald Gordon =

Donald Gordon may refer to:

- Donald Gordon (Canadian businessman) (1901–1969), Bank of Canada and Canadian National Railways executive
- Donald Gordon (South African businessman) (1930–2019), South African businessman and philanthropist
- Don Gordon (actor) (1926–2017), American actor
- Don Gordon (baseball) (born 1959), baseball pitcher
- Donald "Flash" Gordon (1920–2010), World War II US Navy flying ace
- Don Gordon (ice hockey) (born 1948), professional ice hockey player
- Donald Gordon (cricketer) (born 1990), English cricketer
- Donald Gordon, a main character in Roberta Williams' Phantasmagoria
- Donald Wallace Gordon (1932–2016), American gymnast and inventor
