= Phi Psi =

Phi Psi is an American collegiate professional engineering fraternity.

Phi Psi may also refer to:

- Phi Kappa Psi, an American collegiate fraternity
- Dihedral angles of biological molecules
