= Don Williams (disambiguation) =

Don Williams (1939–2017) was an American country music singer.

Don Williams may also refer to:

== Arts and entertainment ==
- Don Williams (singer) (1922–2022), American singer, brother of Andy Williams
- Don S. Williams (1938–2018), Canadian producer, director, actor, choreographer, and writer
- Don Williams (animator) (born 1946/7), American illustrator, animator for Disney

== Sports ==
=== Baseball ===
- Don Williams (1958–1962 pitcher) (1931–2011), American baseball player for the Pittsburgh Pirates and Kansas City A's
- Don Williams (1963 pitcher) (1935–1991), American baseball player for the Minnesota Twins
- Don Williams (baseball scout) (born 1937), American baseball coach, manager, and scout

=== Other sports ===
- Don Williams (guard) (1919–2001), American football player
- Don Williams (American football coach) (1927–2013), American football and track and field coach
- Don Williams (footballer, born 1935) (1935–1995), Australian rules footballer
- Don Williams (footballer, born 1939), Australian rules footballer
- Don Williams (poker player) (1942–2013), American poker player
- Don Williams (racing driver) (1947–1989), American stock car driver
- Don Williams (field hockey) (born 1966), British field hockey player

== Others ==
- Don Williams (Australian railway) (1937–2001), Australian railway engineer and planner
- Donald E. Williams (1942–2016), astronaut
- Donald E. Williams Jr. (born 1957), American politician from Connecticut
- Don Williams, composer and percussionist and brother of film composer, John Williams
- Don Williams, engineer who worked on the world's first communication satellites, Syncom

== See also ==
- Donald Williams (disambiguation)
