= Donald Carlson =

Donald Carlson may refer to:

- Donald C. Carlson (1929–2005), American politician, member of the South Dakota House of Representatives
- Don Carlson (1921–2004), American basketball player
- Don Carlson (politician) (born 1938), American educator and politician, member of both the Washington House of Representatives, and the Washington State Senate
