= Don (given name) =

Male given name

- Gender: Masculine
- Language: English, Irish

Origin
- Origin: Donald
- Meaning: brown, chief, noble

Other names
- Variant form: Donn
- Pet names: Donnie, Donny

Don is a masculine given name in the Irish language, as well as a short form of two masculine given names in the English language. The Irish name is derived from the Irish donn; the name can either mean "brown", or "chief", "noble". The Irish name is a variant spelling of Donn. The English name is unrelated to the Irish name; this name is a short form of the given name Donald or Donovan. Pet forms of this English name include Donnie and Donny.

Don can also be a surname, also derived from "brown".

== See also ==
- List of people named Donald
