= Christ's Church of the Valley =

Coordinates: 33.710057°N 112.208288°W

- Official Logo
- Christ's Church of the Valley
- Location: 7007 W Happy Valley Road; Peoria, Arizona 85382
- Country: United States
- Denomination: Non-denominational, Evangelical
- Website: ccv.church

History
- Founded: 1982
- Founder(s): Don Wilson; Richard Bloodworth

Architecture
- Architect(s): Todd & Associates
- Style: Natural postmodern
- Years built: 2004

Christ's Church of the Valley (CCV) is a non-denominational evangelical Christian multi-site megachurch based in Metropolitan Phoenix, Arizona. The church has several campuses in Arizona. Weekend church attendance was 32,000.

== History ==
Christ's Church of the Valley was founded by pastor Dr. Donald Wilson in 1982 with services held in a rented movie theater. Christ's Church of the Valley also held services in a high school and a strip mall for a short period of time. In 1996, Christ's Church of the Valley found a permanent home, after raising over $1 million in one day to purchase 50 acres of land in the northwest Phoenix. For the first four years on the new property, Christ's Church of the Valley held services in a ‘sprung’ structure with seating for 1,100. In January 2004, Christ's Church of the Valley moved into their current 4,500 seat multi-use structure on a 100-acre campus. In 2006, CCV built two new buildings for its children and youth ministries from over $8 million in funding, raised in one weekend. These buildings opened in fall 2008.

As of 2016, it had 6 campuses in Maricopa County.

On October 29, 2017, Don Wilson, CCV's founding pastor stepped down as Senior Pastor after 35 years at CCV. His replacement was Ashley Wooldridge, who was an Executive Pastor and a Teaching Pastor at the church for ten years prior.

In November 2018, CBS News listed Christ's Church of the Valley as the seventh largest megachurch in the United States with about 23,395 weekly visitors.

According to a church census released in 2023, it claimed a weekly attendance of 37,049 people and 9 campuses in different cities.

As of 2025 they are showing 18 campuses, including the first outside of the Phoenix Metro in Verde Valley, AZ.

== See also ==
- List of the largest evangelical churches
- List of the largest evangelical church auditoriums
