= Donald Douglas =

Donald Douglas may refer to:

- Donald Wills Douglas Sr. (1892–1981), founder of Douglas Aircraft Company
- Donald Wills Douglas Jr. (1917–2004), son of the founder and later president of the company
- Donald Douglas (Scottish actor) (1933–2026), Scottish film and television actor
- Donald Douglas (surgeon) (1911–1993), Scottish surgeon
- Donald Douglas (politician) (born 1957), member of the Kentucky Senate
- Don Douglas (actor) (1905–1945), Scottish-born American actor
- Don Douglas (footballer) (born 1934), Australian rules footballer

== See also ==
- Douglas (surname)
