= Alan Bold =

Scottish poet, writer and saxophonist

Alan Norman Bold (1943–1998) was a Scottish poet, biographer, journalist and saxophonist.

He was born in Edinburgh on 20th April 1943 and attended Broughton High School, before going on to Edinburgh University.

He edited Hugh MacDiarmid's Letters and wrote the influential biography MacDiarmid. Bold had acquainted himself with MacDiarmid in 1963 while still an English Literature student at Edinburgh University. His debut work, Society Inebrious, with a lengthy introduction by MacDiarmid, was published in 1965, during Bold's final university year. This early publication kick-started a prolific poetic career with Bold publishing another three books of verse before the end of the decade, including the ambitious book-length poem The State of the Nation. He also edited The Penguin Book of Socialist Verse (1970) and published a 1973 biography of Robert Burns.

Alan Bold married an art teacher, Alice. Their daughter Valentina is a Robert Burns scholar like her father, who teaches at the University of Glasgow. A lifelong heavy drinker who dealt with the boozy life of the poet in such collections as A Pint of Bitter, Bold died after a short illness in a hospital in Kirkcaldy at the age of 54.

== Publications ==
=== Poetry ===
- Penguin Modern Poets 15, 1969
- Society Inebrious, Mowat Hamilton, Edinburgh, 1965
- The Voyage, 1966
- To Find the New, Chatto and Windus, London, 1967
- A Perpetual Motion Machine, Chatto and Windus, London, 1969
- The State of the Nation, Chatto and Windus, London, 1969
- A Pint of Bitter, Chatto and Windus, 1971
- The Malfeasance, Alan Bold, 1974
- This Fine Day, Borderline Press, 1979

=== Other ===
- The Penguin Book of Socialist Verse Penguin, 1970
- Biography of Robert Burns, Pitkin Pictorials Ltd, 1973
- Letters of Hugh MacDiarmid (edited), 1983
- East is West a novel, Keith Murray Publishing, 1991
- Making Love: The Picador Book of Erotic Verse, 1978
- The Bawdy Beautiful: The Sphere Book of Improper Verse, Editor, 1979
- Mounts of Venus: The Picador Book of Erotic Prose, 1980
- The Sensual Scot, Paul Harris Publishing, Editor, 1982

== Reviews ==
- Murray, Glen (1980), review of This Fine Day, in Cencrastus No. 2, Spring 1980, pp. 43 – 45, ISSN 0264-0856
- Czerkawska, Catherine Lucy (1980), review of The Bawdy Beautiful: The Sphere Book of Improper Verse, Cencrastus No. 2, Spring 1980, p. 45
- Anderson, Carol (1983), The Bold Type, review of The Sensual Scot, in Hearn, Sheila G. (ed.), Cencrastus No. 13, Summer 1983, p. 56

=== External links ===
- Alan Bold at The Scottish Poetry Library biography and appreciation by Richie McCaffery.
