= Christopher Ranch =

American garlic supplier

Christopher Ranch is an American garlic supplier based in Gilroy, California. Founded in 1956, the company processes and supplies millions of pounds of garlic each year, most of which is grown in California, and sold in the United States. The company has roughly 1,000 full-time employees, with the majority working in Gilroy. The bulk of the company's garlic is grown in the Central Valley of California.

== History ==
The company was founded in 1956 by Don Christopher.

In the 1990s, many garlic fields the company had in the Gilroy area were affected with garlic white rot, making further garlic production there impossible.

In 1993, company production reached 100 million pounds of garlic.
