= Donn (given name) =

- Gender: Masculine
- Language: Irish

Origin
- Language: Irish
- Origin: donn
- Meaning: 1. "brown" 2. "chief", "noble"

Other names
- Variant form: Don

Donn is a given name in the Irish language. Donn was originally a byname, which had two meanings: one of the meanings was "brown"; the other was "chief" or "noble". Its use as a given name represents a shortened form of various Gaelic names having donn- as their first element. A variant form of the name is Don.

== People with the byname ==
- Domnall Donn (died 696), king of Dál Riata
- Donnchad Donn (died 944), High King of Ireland
- Gofraid Donn, (fl. 13th century), King of the Isles
- William Donn de Burgh, 3rd Earl of Ulster (1312–1333), noble in the Peerage of Ireland
- Rob Donn (1714–1778), Scottish Gaelic poet

== People with the given name ==
- Donn A. Starry (born 1925), retired United States Army four-star general
- Donn Arden (1916–1994), American choreographer
- Donn Cabral (born 1989), American track and field athlete
- Donn B. Murphy (21st century), President and Executive Director of the National Theatre in Washington, D.C.
- Donn Beach (1907–1989) American businessman, adventurer, and restaurateur
- Donn Cambern (born 1929), American film editor
- Donn Clendenon (1935–2005), first baseman in Major League Baseball
- Donn Cothaid mac Cathail (died 773), King of Connacht
- Donn F. Draeger (1922–1982), American judoka
- Donn F. Eisele (1930–1987), United States Air Force officer
- Donn F. Porter (1931–1952), soldier in the United States Army
- Donn Fendler (1926–2016), lost child and author
- Donn Landee (21st century), American record producer and engineer
- Donn Moomaw (born 1931), American football player
- Donn Pall (born 1962), American professional baseball player
- Donn Pearce (born 1928), American author
- Donn Swaby (born 1973), American actor
- Donn Tatum (1913–1993), president of Walt Disney Productions
- Donn Trenner (born 1927), American jazz pianist
- Donn Barber (1871–1925), American architect

== See also ==
- List of Irish-language given names
