= Villanova Wildcats football =

American football program of Villanova University, Pennsylvania, US

2026 Villanova Wildcats football team
- First season: 1894; 132 years ago
- Head coach: Mark Ferrante; 9th season, 69–36 (.657)
- Location: Villanova, Pennsylvania
- Stadium: Villanova Stadium (capacity: 12,000)
- NCAA division: Division I FCS
- Conference: Patriot League
- Colors: Navy blue and white
- All-time record: 681–510–41 (.569)
- Playoff record: 12–12 (.500)
- Bowl record: 2–2–1 (.500)

NCAA Division I FCS championships
- 2009

Conference championships
- Yankee: 1989, 1991 A-10: 1997, 2001 CAA: 2009, 2012, 2021, 2023
- Rivalries: Delaware (rivalry); Temple (rivalry)
- Fight song: "V for Villanova"
- Mascot: Will D. Cat
- Website: villanova.com/football

The Villanova Wildcats football program represents Villanova University in the NCAA Division I Football Championship Subdivision (FCS, known as Division I-AA until 2006).

The Wildcats compete in the Patriot League for football only. They play on campus at Villanova Stadium with capacity of 12,000. They are led by head coach Mark Ferrante. Former head coach Andy Talley was head coach of the program from its reinstatement in 1985 through 2016 and led the program to its first NCAA Division I FCS national championship in 2009. In 2026 they moved from the Coastal Athletic Association to the Patriot League.

== History ==
The Wildcats football team played their first game 132 years ago in November 1894 coached by Mike Murphy. They continued to play as an independent team for 87 seasons, participating in several Bowl Games and sending numerous players into professional football, including Hall of Fame defensive end Howie Long, a second round selection in the 1981 NFL draft.

On April 14, 1981, the program was officially disbanded due to weak attendance and monetary reasons cited by the university board of trustees. Athletic Director Ted Aceto had stated they had sold only 750 season tickets for the 1980 season with 95 scholarship players; the Wildcats' 1980 season record was 6–5.

Under heavy pressure from alumni and students, the program was reinstated by the board of trustees in April 1984 and sponsored a sold out Blue-White intrasquad game for Homecoming that November. Led by head coach Andy Talley, they began playing a limited schedule of regulation NCAA games in September 1985. The reborn program had instant success, beginning with an undefeated five-game schedule against Division III competition, and beating the Navy junior varsity. The program moved up to Division I-AA (now FCS) and joined the Yankee Conference in 1987, beginning official competition in 1988.

Led by quarterback Kirk Schulz and wide receiver Robert Brady, the Wildcats reached the I-AA playoffs in 1989, bowing to eventual champion Georgia Southern in a spirited, high scoring game.

With All-American linebacker Curtis Eller, the 'Cats returned to the I-AA playoffs in 1991 and 1992, bowing each time to eventual champion Youngstown State.

All-American wide receiver Brian Finneran led the Wildcats to the I-AA playoffs in 1996 before bowing to East Tennessee State.

The 1997 season marked Villanova's first undefeated, untied regular season, as well as their first time reaching No. 1 in the I-AA rankings. The 1997 'Cats featured two future Payton Award winners- Finneran and freshman running back Brian Westbrook. The Cat's defeated Colgate in the I-AA playoffs before falling a 3rd time to nemesis Youngstown State.

In 2002, led by All-American QB Brett Gordon, Villanova advanced to the NCAA I-AA semifinals, defeating Fordham and Furman before falling to McNeese State. Gordon broke his throwing hand early in the Fordham game, and played the final 2 1/2 playoff games with the injury, amassing nearly 1,000 yards of total offense, justifying his first runner-up finish in the Payton Award race.

In 2008, Villanova's roster consisted primarily of sophomores, led by running back Matt Szczur and quarterback Chris Whitney. Ben Ijalana was the starting tackle and started every game of his college career. He was later in the second round of the NFL draft by the Indianapolis Colts. Ijalana was drafted the 2nd highest in school history, behind Hall-of-Famer Howie Long and in front of pro-bowler Brian Westbrook. Linebacker Darrell Young signed with the Washington Redskins, where he transitioned from a collegiate linebacker to a starting fullback in the NFL.

Other players that contributed were WR Brandyn Harvey, WR Norman White, FL Phil Atkinson, RB Aaron Ball, RB Angelo Babbaro, Tony Canci, Ross DB Ventrone, Ramin Mobasseri, Fred Maldonado, and many others. Harvey ended up signing with the Atlanta Falcons, and Ventrone was on the New England Patriots in 2012, appearing in the Super Bowl, the 4th Wildcat to do so (Siani, Long and Westbrook are the others). Ventrone became wildly popular in the NFL locker rooms for his off the field comedic antics, and was featured in a segment on NFL countdown in 2012 by ESPN. Tony Canci and Ramin Mobasseri were walk-ons who earned scholarships through their play. Canci was a dominant blocker at fullback, and was a key factor in Villanova becoming the championship team that dominated the 2009 season. Mobasseri was the first walk-on in school history to earn 'most improved' award. Villanova went 10–3 losing only 2 FCS games all season. Both losses were to James Madison on a "Hail Mary" game ending TD in the regular season and a last minute quarterfinal loss in the NCAA playoff quarterfinals.

In 2009, Villanova won the NCAA Division I FCS national championship, defeating Montana 23–21 in Chattanooga, Tennessee, and finished with a 14–1 overall record. Junior Matt Szczur was voted championship game MVP and was selected as a 1st team All-American at two positions- offense and special teams. Junior Chris Whitney was also voted 1st team All-American. On their way to the championship Villanova defeated FBS Temple, losing only to New Hampshire, and was CAA co-conference Champion with the Richmond Spiders, whom Villanova defeated at Richmond on a 4th down TD pass. Villanova hosted three playoff games, defeating Holy Cross, avenging their regular season loss to New Hampshire with a lopsided victory played in a driving snowstorm, and edging CAA rival William & Mary 14–13 under the ESPN TV lights on a frigid night.

In 2010 season, Villanova returned to the NCAA semifinals, this time going on a 9,000-mile odyssey while defeating No. 3 Stephen F. Austin and No. 1 ranked Appalachian State before losing to eventual champion Eastern Washington. Villanova ended the 2010 campaign ranked No. 3 in the nation in FCS and knocked off two No. 1 ranked teams on the road in 3 weeks late in the season including National Runner-up Delaware. Following the 2010 season, Szczur signed with the Chicago Cubs and made his major league debut in 2014.

The 2012 season saw Villanova win the CAA Conference Championship and reach the NCAA playoffs, finishing 8–4. The roster included several notable underclassmen, including freshman QB John Robertson and Sophomore running back Kevin Monangai.

Villanova returned to prominence in 2014, dropping a thrilling opener at FBS Syracuse 27–26 in double overtime, serving notice that the Cats were back. QB Robertson continued to march his way into the record books, aided by seniors Poppy Livers (WR) and Monangai. The much improved Cat defense was led by a standout linebacking corps of juniors Don Cherry and Dillon Lucas, and Senior Joey Harmon. Senior Joe Sarnese anchored the defensive backfield while senior NT Pat Williams has steadied the defensive line. The offensive line was led by senior Ross Hall. The kicking game struggled to fill the void left by the graduation of four year P/PK Mark Hamilton. The Cats reached the NCAA FCS quarterfinals defeating Liberty and losing to Sam Houston State at home. Payton award winner Robertson was concussed late in the Liberty game and unable to play in the Sam Houston game, where his backup played admirably in a losing effort.

Coach Talley returned the NCAA FCS playoffs for the 12th and final time in 2016, defeating St. Francis before bowing to South Dakota State on a last second snow blown field goal banked off the upright by the Jack's Adam Vinatierri, Jr.

In 2026 they moved from the Coastal Athletic Association to the Patriot League.

=== Andy Talley era (1985–2016) ===
Villanova head coach Andy Talley completed 37 seasons as a collegiate head coach, including 32 seasons at Villanova. The winningest coach in school history and the winningest coach in CAA history, Talley's Villanova record stands at an impressive 230–137–1. Throughout his Main Line career, Talley guided the Wildcats to twelve NCAA playoff appearances, six conference championships, three Lambert Meadowlands Cup, three ECAC Team of the Year awards. Included in the NCAA appearances are three NCAA semifinal appearances and the 2009 National Championship.

A graduate of Haverford (Pa.) High School just five minutes from the Villanova campus, Coach Talley is a native of Bryn Mawr. When he was head coach, he could feel responsible for every facet of the Villanova program, having started it from scratch after he was hired on May 29, 1984 as the school's 29th head coach. Talley led Villanova teams to NCAA FCS (Formerly Division I-AA) playoff appearances in 1989, 1991, 1992, 1996, 1997, 2002, 2008, 2009, 2010, 2012, 2014 and 2016. Following his National Championship success in 2009, Talley received numerous coaching honors. Highlighting the list was the AFCA National Coach of the Year Award. Talley also earned this award in 1997 and becomes just the 17th coach to win the award twice. He also garnered the 2009 CAA Coach of the Year, the Sportsman's Award from the Marine Corps Scholarship Foundation and the Maxwell Club President's Award. In 2008, Talley was named the AFCA Regional Coach of the Year, the Field Turf/Howie Long FCS National Coach of the Year and the Maxwell Club Coach of the Year. Talley's all-time College Coaching record stands at 218–135–2 including his 5 years at the helm of St Lawrence College where he had advanced to the D-III National Semifinals in 1982.

=== Football upgrade controversy ===
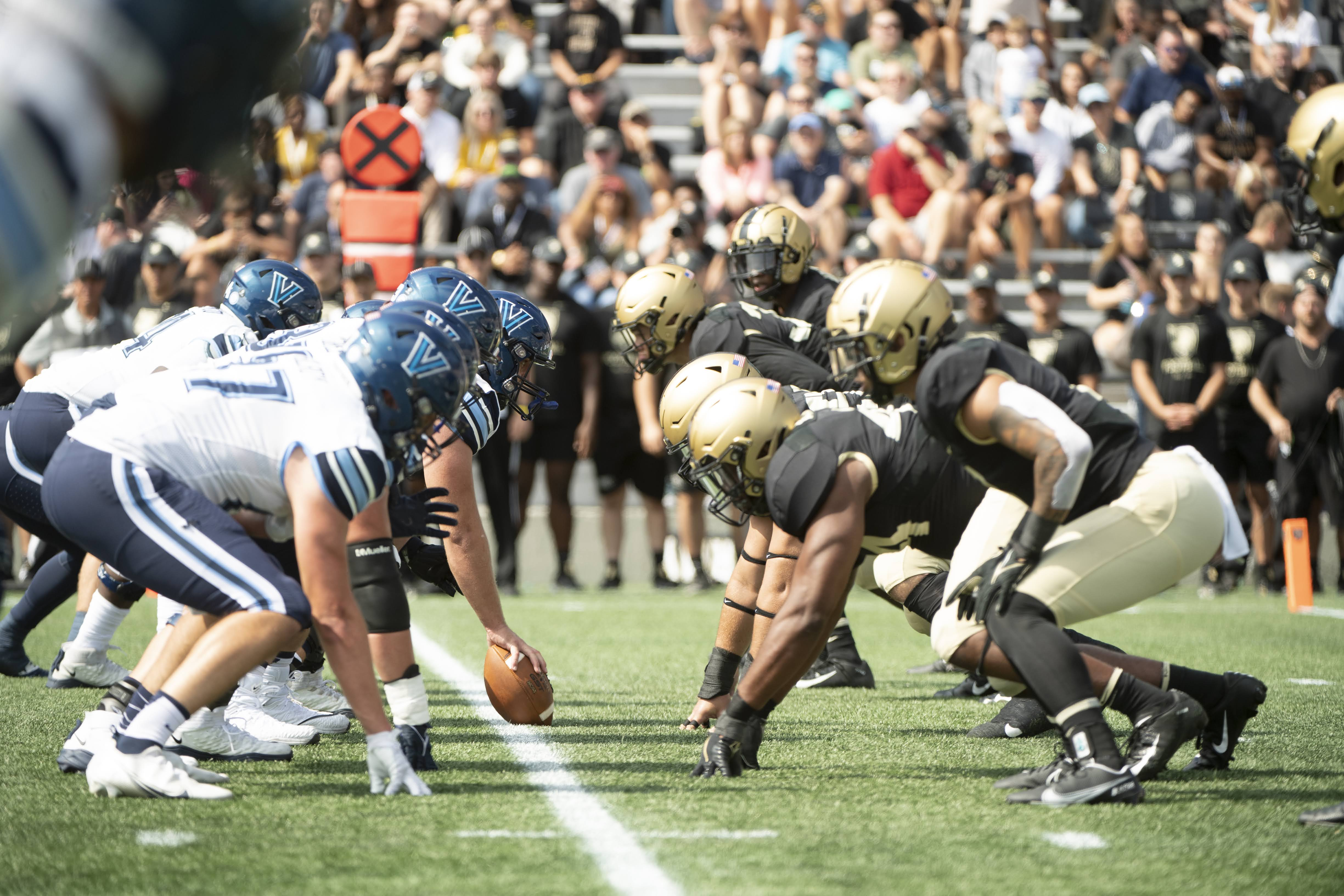
Villanova vs. Army in 2022

Following the 2009 NCAA championship season, Villanova has considered moving into the Football Bowl Subdivision and joining the Big East Conference in football. Villanova Stadium located on-campus stadium seats only 12,500, less than the 15,000 requirement for an FBS-eligible team. In September 2010, the Big East informally discussed the possibility that Villanova might become a football member. The school undertook a feasibility study involving the costs involved with such an upgrade. An upgrade of the football program would require building new football facilities and corresponding increases to its women's sports program due to Title IX issues, as well as a move to a larger game venue in the region with speculation focused on the new PPL Park soccer stadium. Prior to the scheduled April 12, 2011, Board of Trustees vote on the football upgrade, several Big East football schools objected to the Villanova plans to use PPL Park. That venue seats 18,500 and Villanova proposed an expansion of the capacity, which was never fulfilled after the upgrade fell through. With the ongoing uncertainty of the Big East Football Conference after losing founding football members Syracuse, Pittsburgh, and West Virginia, the Villanova Board of Trustees has never voted regarding the topic of moving to FBS.

In December 2012, Villanova's administration announced its intentions to split away from the now-former Big East (now The American Athletic Conference) configuration along with the other 6 "basketball centric" Big East Schools to form their own all-sports conference highlighted by their deep basketball traditions. For the present, Villanova will continue to compete for National Championships in the College Football Championship Subdivision as a member of the Colonial Athletic Conference ("CAA"). This decision had the effect of ending the question of whether Villanova should move up to the FBS for football. The new basketball centric Big East has proven to be a great success for Villanova University catapulting the Men's Basketball program to the top of the NCAA winning National Championships in 2016 and 2018.

== Championships ==
=== National championships ===
The Wildcats won their first national championship on December 18, 2009 under Andy Talley. The team defeated the Montana Grizzlies in the national championship game in Chattanooga by a score of 23–21.

Year	NCAA championship	Head coach	Record	Opponent	Result
2009	FCS National Championship	Andy Talley	14–1	Montana	W 23–21

== Conference affiliations ==
- NCAA Division I-A Independent (1894–1980)
  - Football program was dropped following the 1980 season and reinstated for 1985 season
- NCAA Division I-AA Independent (1985–1987)
- Yankee Conference (1988–1996)
- Atlantic 10 Conference (1997–2006)
- CAA Football (2007–2025)
- Patriot League (2026–present)

After playing as an independent from 1985 to 1987, Villanova Football joined the Yankee Conference for the 1988 season before winning Conference titles in both 1989 and 1991.

In 1997, the Yankee Conference was absorbed into the Atlantic 10, following the NCAA's rule changes regarding single-sport conferences. In 9 years with the A-10, Villanova won 2 conference championships (1997, 2001).

In 2005, all A-10 football schools agreed to switch conferences after the 2006 season and became charter members of the Colonial Athletic Association. The Wildcats qualified for the playoffs in three consecutive seasons from 2008 through 2010. Villanova won the CAA Championship during their 2009 national championship season. Villanova won a share of another CAA Championship in the 2012 season with a 6–2 Conference record.

== Postseason ==
=== NCAA Division I-AA/FCS playoffs ===
The Wildcats have made 17 appearances in the Division I-AA/FCS Playoffs, with a combined record of 17–16. They were FCS National Champions in 2009 and have reached the Semifinals 4 times (2002, 2009, 2010 and 2025).

Year	Round	Opponent	Result
1989	First Round	Georgia Southern	L 36–52
1991	First Round	Youngstown State	L 16–17
1992	First Round	Youngstown State	L 20–23
1996	First Round	East Tennessee State	L 29–35
1997	First Round; Quarterfinals	Colgate; Youngstown State	W 49–28; L 34–37
2002	First Round; Quarterfinals; Semifinals	Furman; Fordham; McNeese State	W 45–38; W 24–10; L 28–39
2008	First Round; Quarterfinals	Colgate; James Madison	W 55–28; L 28–31
2009	First Round; Quarterfinals; Semifinals; National Championship	Holy Cross; New Hampshire; William & Mary; Montana	W 38–28; W 46–7; W 14–13; W 23–21
2010	First Round; Quarterfinals; Semifinals	Stephen F. Austin; Appalachian State; Eastern Washington	W 54–24; W 42–24; L 31–41
2012	First Round	Stony Brook	L 10–20
2014	Second Round; Quarterfinals	Liberty; Sam Houston State	W 29–22; L 31–34
2016	First Round; Second Round	Saint Francis (PA); South Dakota State	W 31–21; L 7–10
2019	First Round	Southeastern Louisiana	L 44–45
2021	Quarterfinals	South Dakota State	L 21–35
2023	Second Round; Quarterfinals	Youngstown State; South Dakota State	W 45–28; L 12–23
2024	First Round; Second Round	Eastern Kentucky; Incarnate Word	W 22–17; L 6–13
2025	First Round; Second Round; Quarterfinals; Semifinals	Harvard; Lehigh; Tarleton State; Illinois State	W 52–7; W 14–7; W 26–21; L 14–30

=== Bowl games ===
Villanova Football played in 5 bowl games through its history, compiling a record of 2–2–1.

Season	Bowl game	Opponent	Result
1936	Bacardi Bowl	Auburn	T 7–7
1947	Great Lakes Bowl	Kentucky	L 14–24
1948	Harbor Bowl	Nevada	W 27–7
1961	Sun Bowl	Wichita	W 17–9
1962	Liberty Bowl	Oregon State	L 0–6

==== 1937 Bacardi Bowl ====
Villanova's history in bowl games began on January 1, 1937, when the Wildcats participated in the Bacardi Bowl for their first bowl appearance. Played in Havana, Cuba as the climactic event of Cuba's National Sports Festival, the game almost never came to be because of a bloodless revolution led by Fulgencio Batista. The ‘Cats opponent, Auburn University, had rolled up an impressive 7–2–2 record and had closed out the 1936 regular season with six shutout wins on their schedule. Villanova, under coaching great Clipper Smith, piled up a sterling 7–2 record, and had earned victories over the likes of Penn State, Boston University, Detroit and South Carolina. Like Auburn, Villanova boasted of an outstanding defense, one that recorded four shutouts and had not allowed any opponent more than seven points. At halftime, Auburn led 7–0. Late in the fourth quarter, with time running out for the Wildcats; Auburn had possession of the ball inside its own 15-yard line. Facing second down and eight yards to go for a first down, Auburn mentor Jack Meagher called for a quick kick, a play Auburn had used successfully on a couple of occasions in the first half. Shifting into the quick kick position at the Auburn goal line, Villanova’s John Wysocki and Valentine Rizzo blocked the kick and lineman Matthew Kuber grabbed the ball at the two-yard line and went in for the touchdown. William Christopher kicked the all-important point after and the Wildcats had gained a 7–7 tie."

==== 1947 Great Lakes Bowl ====
In a match-up of Wildcats, Kentucky defeated Villanova 24–14 in the Great Lakes Bowl played at Cleveland Stadium with attendance of 14,908 on December 6, 1947. Villanova, coached by Jordan Olivar, brought a 6–2–1 record into the game. Kentucky of the Southeastern Conference was in its second season under coach Paul "Bear" Bryant and brought a 7–3 record into the game.

In the first quarter Kentucky's George Blanda kicked a 27-yard field goal. At halftime Kentucky led 3–0. In the third quarter Kentucky's Jim Howe had a 29-yard touchdown run; Blanda's point after kick gave Kentucky a 10–0 lead.

Yet Villanova, behind the accurate throws of highly touted quarterback Andy Gordon, marched back. Two plays into the fourth period, Villanova's Ralph Pasquariello, carrying several Kentucky defenders on his back, rambled 11-yards into the endzone. John Siano's conversion pulled Villanova within a field goal, 10–7.

Later in the fourth quarter, Kentucky's Jack Griffin broke through the Villanova line to partially block a punt, giving Kentucky excellent field position at the 25-yard line. Several plays later, Kentucky's Bill Boller raced 25 yards for a touchdown, and after the Blanda extra-point, Kentucky had cushioned its lead to 17–7. With time now against them, Villanova went to the air, but Kentucky's Boller intercepted a Gordon pass and returned it 49 yards for another touchdown. Now trailing 24–7, Gordon returned to the air first hitting Zip Zehler with a 38-yard strike, Gordon then connected with John Sheehan for a 13-yard touchdown pass. With the Siano conversion the score was 24–14.

==== 1949 Harbor Bowl ====
Villanova Wildcats played in the Harbor Bowl on January 1, 1949 in Balboa Stadium in San Diego where they defeated the University of Nevada 27–7. Nevada, the nation's leading passing team led by All-American QB Stan Heath (American football), could do no better than match Villanova's aerial yardage. The first two times the Wildcats got hold of the ball they marched for touchdowns. The Wolf Pack got nowhere after taking the opening kickoff, and had to punt. Whereupon Villanova drove from midfield some 47 yards to a score. Ralph Pasquariello, the plowing 228 pound fullback, hammered off tackle, and Bill Doherty tossed long to Ed Berrang. It was climaxed with D'Alonzo plunging through from the three. Frank Sanches blocked the conversion. Nova's Andy Gordon intercepted Heath's pass and Villanova drove again. This one 43 yards. Pasquariello, going wide on pitch-outs, powered the Main Liners downfield and Polidor went around right end for the touchdown behind massed interference. Clavin kicked conversion and it was 13–0 with 10 minutes gone. The Wildcats picked up another pair of scores in the third period while Nevada's record setting QB, Stan Heath, watched glumly from the bench where he had been sidetracked with two broken ribs and Nevada's speedburning fullback Sherman Howard was being stitched up after a slashing blow to his forehead. On the first play after Nevada punted a horde of blockers got out in front of a scampering John Geppi, 180-pounder from Baltimore, who was escorted down the sidelines, all the 80 yards to a touchdown. Clavin converted, 20–7. A moment later a succession of breaks accounted for the fourth and final score. On a long pass from Nevada's reserve QB Alva Tabor, receiver Dan Orlich fell over the umpire and it went incomplete. Tabor then tossed to Harold Hayes but Nevada was penalized back to its own 18. Then another Tabor pass fell in the hands of Villanova's Steve Romanik who ran it back all the way to Nevada's 8yd line. Pete D'Alonzo, 210-pounder from Orange, N. J., smashed through for the score and Clavin kicked conversion, 27–7. The rest of the game, played in the heavy downpour of rain, was an exchange of fumbles and interceptions and the score remained in Villanova's favor.

==== 1961 Sun Bowl ====
Villanova defeated Wichita State 17–9 in the Sun Bowl at Kidd Field in El Paso, Texas, on December 30. Coach Alex Bell’s 7–1 Wildcats were selected to meet the Wichita University Shockers. His top punter and key receiver, Ron Meyers was declared ineligible for the game because he had already entered into a professional agreement with the Cleveland Browns. Wichita State was a 6-point favorite with Coach Hank Foldberg’s flashy passing offense featuring Alex Zyskowski and Bill Stangerone. The tone of the game was set early. Villanova's defense bottled Wichita up and the offense drove 43 yards on two Billy Joe runs. Joe shook off three Shockers on a 19-yard touchdown run. In 1961, Joe was a terrifying weapon. The 240-pound fullback was also a champion shot putter. While playing for less than half of the game, he would be named MVP on the strength of 63 yards on 8 carries. The Villanova defensive line, which outweighed Wichita by 17 lbs. a man up front, kept the pressure on all day. They keyed on back, Bill Stangerone and forced 4 Shocker interceptions. They knocked Alex Zyskowski out of the game with a head injury in the second half. He would not return until the last 5 minutes of the game. Villanova led 7–0 throughout most of the first half. With less than three minutes to play, with Stangerone at quarterback, the Shockers drove 47 yards to the Wildcat 18-yard line. Bill Seigle kicked a Sun Bowl record, 36-yard field goal to bring the Shockers to within four at the half. The key play in the game occurred at the opening of the second half. Wichita fumbled the second half kickoff, which was recovered by VU at the 21. Lou Rettino's 1-yard run gave the Wildcats a 14–3 lead. Later in the 3rd quarter, Villanova's Sam Gruneisen kicked a 26-yard field goal which made the score 17–3. In the final minutes of the game, Zyskowski returned to lead Wichita on a scoring drive. He hit Adolph Wilson with a 35-yard pass. Zyskowski then swept the end for the score on a 5-yard run with less than a minute remaining to make the final score was 17–9. The story of the game could be seen in the statistics. Villanova outgained Wichita on the ground, 225 yards to 111. Their defense was simply overpowering.

==== 1962 Liberty Bowl ====
Oregon State, led by Heisman Trophy winner Terry Baker, defeated Villanova in the Liberty Bowl by the score of 6–0 in Municipal Stadium aka JFK Stadium in Philadelphia on December 15. While not as heralded as the Oregon State squad, Coach Alex Bell's Villanova had also enjoyed an outstanding season, compiling a 7–2 record. The game immediately became a defensive struggle, and to the surprise of many, Villanova dominated. The Wildcats seemingly got a big break midway through the first quarter when William Sherlock's 52-yard punt was downed by Larry Glueck on the one-foot line. One play later, disaster struck as Oregon State's Terry Baker got loose around end, and raced to a 99-yard touchdown with 9:24 left in the opening period. Baker tried a two-point conversion, but the Wildcats regrouped to break up his pass, leaving the score 6–0 in Oregon State's favor. Another tough break occurred immediately for Villanova. Taking the ensuing kickoff down to the Beavers’ 12-yard line, they seemingly deadlocked the contest when Billy Joe made his way around the left end and romped 12-yards into the endzone. But a holding call nullified the play, and two plays later a Villanova pass was intercepted. The score stood at 6–0 at the half. The third quarter was scoreless, as both teams’ defenses remained unbending. In the closing minutes of the fourth quarter, Villanova made one last effort. Starting on their own 30-yard line, the Wildcats drove to Oregon State's 11-yard line before fumbling away a chance to win the game. For the day, Villanova dominated OSU's undersized line and outgained the Beavers on the ground 246–176, and had nine more first downs, 20–11. However, Oregon State's one big play, coupled with the ‘Cats four fumbles and two interceptions, sealed the win for OSU.

== Rivalries ==
=== Delaware ===
Villanova plays Delaware in the "Battle of the Blue." The all-time series between Villanova and Delaware dates back over 100 years to the first meeting between the teams on November 23, 1895. The Wildcats lead the series by a current margin of 24–21–1 and have won six out of seven against the Blue Hens since the inception of the Battle of the Blue Trophy. As CAA conference rivals in FCS, the teams have met each season since 1988 and Villanova head coach Andy Talley is 13–12 in his career versus Delaware. The 2011 game played at PPL Park in Chester, PA was the first American football game to be played in that venue.

=== Temple ===
The Wildcats finished a four-year series in which they play the Division I-A FBS Temple for the Philadelphia "Mayor's Cup" on Temple's home turf at Lincoln Financial Field. Villanova won the inaugural game in September 2009 in front of a crowd of 27,759 on a last second field goal by Nick Yako. The Wildcats lost the 2010 game on late field goal by the Owls in front of a larger crowd of 32,193. Temple won the 2011 game in convincing fashion for the FBS program in front of an announced crowd of 32,638 and followed that up with another solid win in 2012. Prior to the "Mayors Cup", the two teams last met in 2003 when Villanova tallied a 23–20 upset win in double overtime over the FBS program. The Philadelphia programs first met on November 8, 1928 in a game that ended in a 0–0 tie. They met for 16 consecutive years but suspended the series after the 1943 game won by Villanova. The series was reignited in 1970 with a Wildcat win and continued for 11 years through the 1980 game also won by Villanova, in Howie Long's final game as a collegian and, as it turned out, Villanova's final game in Division I-A. The Wildcats continue to lead the all-time series vs Temple 16–15–2, including two recent wins over the FBS Owls by the FCS Wildcats. The series resumed in 2017 at Lincoln Financial Field in its now-traditional Labor Day Weekend slot.

=== Penn ===
Villanova also plays intra-city rival University of Pennsylvania in a match-up with "college football's most historic program." The majority of the games with the Ivy League powerhouse are played at historic Franklin Field on the campus of Penn. The teams first met on November 18, 1905 in a game won by Penn. The Quakers won the first five meetings through 1911 and then the two teams did not play again until 1980 when Villanova won their first game of the series. The teams renewed the series as FCS (I-AA) teams in 1999 and Villanova has won all 13 games since then in some very close battles. Villanova holds a 14–5 lead in the series versus Penn after their 2014 victory.

== Facilities ==
=== Villanova Stadium ===
Historic Villanova Stadium was built as part of a school expansion program in 1927 and dedicated on October 8, 1927. On May 7, 1930, the playing field at Villanova Stadium was dedicated to the memory of Leo Francis Goodreau, a Villanova football player who died due to injuries incurred in practice in 1928 season. On September 27, 1980, the running track was dedicated to Villanova's track and field coach James "Jumbo" Elliott.

In Fall 1999, the Stadium underwent a facelift with the Stadium Renovation Project. Included in this project was a state of the art press box, in addition to housing an 80-person meeting room for all Villanova Athletic Department personnel to use. The former AstroTurf playing field was replaced during the spring of 2002 with a synthetic grass surface known as AstroPlay. The stadium received a new scoreboard along with a new playing surface for the Fall 2009 sport seasons. The stadium seats 12,500.

=== Talen Energy Stadium ===
Villanova football debuted at Talen Energy Stadium, originally known as PPL Park, as an alternate home stadium on November 19, 2011, in the annual Battle of the Blue rivalry game vs Delaware. Villanova is planning to play a select group of future football games at the venue.

Talen Energy Stadium is home to the MLS Philadelphia Union and has served as one of the key catalysts of the revitalization of the Chester Waterfront located 15 miles south of Center City, Philadelphia. The stadium has a natural grass playing surface and current seating capacity of 18,500, with further expansion plans in discussion. The first expansion phase would add 1,500 additional seats, the 2nd phase would add 7000 additional seats, and a 3rd phase could bring the stadium to an eventual 30,000 total seats. However, only the first phase has a determined timeline by the Philadelphia Union. The stadium has 29 luxury suites, an 11,000 square foot full-service club restaurant, state of the art LED signage, and innovative experiential zones. Expansive grass areas and large promenades surround the stadium for tailgating.

== All-Conference and All-American Selections ==
=== FCS All-American Selections ===
- 2021 - Forrest Rhyne (1st Team Defense - Linebacker)
- 2021 - Christian Benford (1st Team Defense - Cornerback)
- 2016 - Tanoh Kpassagnon (1st Team Defense - Defensive End)
- 2016- Austin Calitro (1st Team Defense- Linebacker)
- 2015 - Don Cherry (american football) (2nd Team Defense - Linebacker)
- 2014 - John Robertson (2nd Team Offense - Quarterback)
- 2014 - Don Cherry (american football) (2nd Team Defense - Linebacker)
- 2014 - Vince Kowalski (3rd Team Offense - Offensive Line)

=== 2022 CAA All-Conference Selections ===
==== Offense ====
- Jaaron Hayek (1st Team - Wide Receiver)
- Michael Corbi (2nd Team - Offensive Line)
- Dez Boykin (2nd Team - Kick Returner)
- Matthew Mercurio (3rd Team - Kicker)

=== 2021 CAA All-Conference Selections ===
==== Offense ====
- Michael Corbi (1st Team - Offensive Line)
- Justin Covington (2nd Team - Running Back)
- Rayjoun Pringle (2nd Team - Wide Receiver)
- Todd Summers (2nd Team - Tight End)
- Colin Gamroth (2nd Team - Offensive Line)
- Cole Bunce (2nd Team - Kicker)
- Daniel Smith (3rd Team - Quarterback)
- Jaaron Hayek (3rd Team - Wide Receiver)

==== Defense ====
- Forrest Rhyne (1st Team - Linebacker)
- Christian Benford (1st Team - Cornerback)
- Malik Fisher (2nd Team - Defensive End)
- Amin Black (3rd Team - Linebacker)
- TD Ayo-Durojaiye (3rd Team - Special Teams)

=== 2020 CAA All-Conference Selections ===
==== Offense ====
- Michael Corbi (1st Team - Offensive Line)
- Justin Covington (2nd Team - Running Back)
- Rayjoun Pringle (2nd Team - Wide Receiver)
- Colin Gamroth (2nd Team - Offensive Line)
- Dez Boykin (2nd Team - Returner)

==== Defense ====
- Forrest Rhyne (1st Team - Linebacker)
- Malik Fisher (1st Team - Defensive End)
- Christian Benford (1st Team - Cornerback)

=== 2019 CAA All-Conference Selections ===
==== Offense ====
- Paul Grattan (1st Team - Offensive Line)
- Daniel Smith (3rd Team - Quarterback)
- Justin Covington (3rd Team - Running Back)
- Changa Hodge (3rd Team - Wide Receiver)
- Colin Gamroth (3rd Team - Offensive Line)

==== Defense ====
- Forrest Rhyne (1st Team - Linebacker)
- Nathan Fondacaro (1st Team - Punter)
- Malik Fisher (3rd Team - Defensive End)
- Drew Wiley (3rd Team - Linebacker)
- Jaquan Amos (3rd Team - Cornerback)

=== 2018 CAA All-Conference Selections ===
==== Offense ====
- Aaron Forbes (2nd Team - Running Back)
- Ethan Greenidge (2nd Team - Offensive Line)

==== Defense ====
- Christian Benford (3rd Team - Cornerback)

=== 2017 CAA All-Conference Selections ===
==== Offense ====
- Ethan Greenidge (2nd Team - Offensive Line)

==== Defense ====
- Ed Shockley (1st Team - Linebacker)
- John Hinchen (1st Team - Punter)
- Malik Reaves (2nd Team - Cornerback)

=== 2016 CAA All-Conference Selections ===
==== Offense ====
- Brad Seaton (2nd Team - Offensive Line)
- Aaron Forbes (3rd Team - Running Back)
- Ryan Bell (3rd Team - Tight End)

==== Defense ====
- Tanoh Kpassagnon (1st Team - Defensive End)
- Austin Calitro (1st Team - Linebacker)
- Rob Rolle (1st Team - Safety)
- Bryan Osei (3rd Team - Defensive End)
- Ed Shockley (3rd Team - Linebacker)
- John Hinchen (3rd Team - Punter)

=== 2015 CAA All-Conference Selections ===
==== Offense ====
- Gary Underwood (1st Team - Fullback)
- Kevin Gulyas (2nd Team - Wide Receiver)

==== Defense ====
- Tanoh Kpassagnon (1st Team - Defensive End)
- Don Cherry (American football) (1st Team - Linebacker)
- Malik Reaves (2nd Team - Cornerback)
- Austin Calitro (3rd Team - Linebacker)
- Jason Ceneus (3rd Team - Cornerback)
- Cameron McCurry (3rd Team - Safety)

=== 2014 CAA All-Conference Selections ===
==== Offense ====
- John Robertson (1st Team - Quarterback)
- Vince Kowalski (1st Team - Offensive Line)
- Poppy Livers (2nd Team - Wide Receiver)
- Ross Hall (2nd Team - Offensive Line)
- Kevin Monangai (3rd Team - Running Back)
- Gary Underwood (3rd Team - Fullback)

==== Defense ====
- Don Cherry (American football) (1st Team - Linebacker)
- Pat Williams (2nd Team - Nose Guard)
- Joe Sarnese (2nd Team - Safety)
- Jason Ceneus (3rd Team - Cornerback)

== Individual awards ==
=== Walter Payton Award winners ===
The Walter Payton Award is awarded annually to the most outstanding college offensive player in the Division I Football Championship Subdivision (formerly Division I-AA) as chosen by a nationwide panel of media and college sports information directors. Villanova and Eastern Washington are the only two programs in the country to have 3 award recipients.

- 1997 – Wide receiver Brian Finneran; went on to play several seasons in the NFL mostly with the Atlanta Falcons.
- 2001 – Running back Brian Westbrook; went on to a highly successful NFL career with the Philadelphia Eagles.
- 2014 – Quarterback John Robertson.

=== Jerry Rice Award winners ===
The Jerry Rice Award is awarded annually to the most outstanding freshman player in the Division I Football Championship Subdivision (formerly Division I-AA) of college football as chosen by a nationwide panel of media and college sports information directors. Initiated following the 2011 season, the first two awards went to CAA players.

- Quarterback John Robertson won the 2012 Jerry Rice Award as a redshirt freshman leading his team to a CAA championship and FCS playoff berth in an 8–4 turn-around season for the Wildcats who were 2–9 the year before. Robertson helped fuel Villanova's turnaround as a dual-threat signal-caller. He started 10 games in the regular season plus an FCS playoff game and he finished the season rushing for 1,021 yards and 14 touchdowns and passing for 1,965 yards and 14 more touchdowns.

=== CAA Conference Award winners ===
Year	Player	Award	Source
2021	Forrest Rhyne	CAA Defensive Player of the Year	
2020	Justin Covington	Chuck Boone Leadership and Excellence Award	
2019	Chucky Smith	Chuck Boone Leadership and Excellence Award	
2018	Christian Benford	CAA Defensive Rookie of the Year	
2017	Tanoh Kpassagnon	CAA Defensive Player of the Year	
2015	Zach Bednarczyk	CAA Co-Offensive Rookie of the Year	

== Notable players ==
85 former Villanova players have played professional football dating back to 1920, including Howard "Fungy" Lebengood who was a halfback on the uncrowned World Champion 1925 Pottsville Maroons.

41 Villanova players have been drafted into the National Football League. The only Villanova alumnus in the Pro Football Hall of Fame is former Raiders defensive end Howie Long.

12 players from the Talley era played in the NFL.

- Terry Butler
- Clarence Curry
- Brian Finneran
- Christian Gaddis
- Ben Ijalana
- Tanoh Kpassagnon
- Willie Oshodin
- Raymond Ventrone
- Ross Ventrone
- Brian Westbrook
- George Winslow
- Darrel Young

Although he never played professional football, Matt Szczur, a star on the 2009 national championship team, went on to a professional baseball career, winning a World Series in 2016 as a member of the Chicago Cubs, and last played in the major leagues in 2018 for the San Diego Padres.

== Future non-conference opponents ==
Announced schedules as of January 2, 2026.

2026
at Louisville
at LIU
Morgan State
