= Donald Williams =

Donald Williams may refer to:

- Donald Williams (politician) (1919–1990), British Conservative Party politician
- Donald E. Williams (1942–2016), NASA astronaut
- Donald E. Williams Jr. (born 1957), member of the Connecticut General Assembly
- Donald Williams (basketball) (born 1973), American basketball player
- Duck Williams (Donald Edgar Williams, born 1956), American basketball player for the New Orleans Jazz
- Donald Williams (field hockey) (born 1966), British former field hockey player
- Donald Cary Williams (1899–1983), American philosopher and a professor at both the University of California Los Angeles and at Harvard University
- Donald Ray Williams Jr. (born 1956), American baseball coach

== See also ==
- Don Williams (disambiguation)
- List of people with surname Williams
