= Andy Gordon (Canadian football) =

American gridiron football player (1927–?)

No. 61
- Position: Quarterback

Personal information
- Born: 1927; Philadelphia, Pennsylvania, U.S.
- Died: ?
- Listed height: 6 ft 0 in (1.83 m)
- Listed weight: 175 lb (79 kg)

Career information
- High school: St. Joseph's (Philadelphia)
- College: Penn (1944–1945); Villanova (1946–1948)
- NFL draft: 1949: undrafted

Career history
- Ottawa Rough Riders (1949–1950)

Awards and highlights
- IRFU All-Star (1949)

Andrew J. Gordon Jr. (1927 – ?) was an American former professional football quarterback who played in the Interprovincial Rugby Football Union (IRFU) with the Ottawa Rough Riders. He played college football for the Penn Quakers and Villanova Wildcats.

== Early life ==
Gordon was born in 1927 and grew up in Philadelphia, Pennsylvania. He attended St. Joseph's Preparatory School and only started playing football as a junior. Gordon worked multiple jobs while going to school to save money for college.

== College career ==
Gordon played college football for the Penn Quakers from 1944 to 1945 and Villanova Wildcats from 1946 to 1948. In his first season at Villanova, he completed 28 of 55 passes for 329 yards. Gordon was also a member of the Villanova basketball team.

== Professional career ==
On April 25, 1949, Gordon signed with the Ottawa Rough Riders of the Interprovincial Rugby Football Union (IRFU). He was noted by the Rough Riders as a "fair kicker, a better-than-average passer, and a good ball-carrier" and was named the starting quarterback for the 1949 season. In 12 games, Gordon passed for two touchdowns, rushed for two and had one receiving touchdown. He was voted as the team's Most Outstanding Player and earned IRFU All-Star honors.

On December 1, Gordon re-signed with the Rough Riders to a one-year contract. He played in 12 games, passing for eight touchdowns and rushing for three. Gordon also had one interception. Ahead of the 1951 season, he told the team that he would return in August to compete for the starting quarterback job. In July, Gordon retired from professional football after the new coach, Clem Crowe, did not offer a seasonal contract.
