= Delta Kappa Phi =

American professional collegiate fraternity

- ΔΚΦ
- Founded: November 16, 1899; 126 years ago Philadelphia Textile Institute
- Type: Social
- Affiliation: Independent
- Status: Active
- Emphasis: Textiles
- Scope: Local (formerly national)
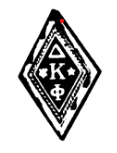
- Member badge
- Colors: Royal Purple and White
- Chapters: 1
- Members: 4,177 (2017) lifetime
- Headquarters: Lowell, Massachusetts; United States
- Website: www.deltakappaphifraternity.com

Delta Kappa Phi (ΔΚΦ) is an American professional–social collegiate fraternity established in 1899. As of 2017 it has one active chapter.

== History ==
Delta Kappa Phi was founded as a professional textile fraternity by students at the Philadelphia Textile Institute (later Philadelphia University and now Thomas Jefferson University) on November 16, 1899. The purpose of Delta Kappa Phi is "the promotion and encouragement of a fraternal relationship among its members; the furtherance of social enjoyment among its members; and the advancement of the interests of its members in acquiring a thorough education in engineering, the sciences or the liberal arts." Its founders were Leon H. Buck, J. Paul Jones, Harris A. Soloman, and Charles E. Washburn.

Although its founders initially planned to seek affiliation with a national fraternity, that plan was soon shelved and the organization expanded to other schools, focusing on institutions with textile programs. Its second chapter, Beta, was chartered in 1902 at the Lowell Technological Institute (now the University of Massachusetts Lowell, or UMass Lowell), and the organization gradually established Delta at New Bedford Institute of Textiles and Technology (now part of UMass Dartmouth), Gamma at the Rhode Island School of Design, Kappa at North Carolina State University, and Theta at Georgia Tech.

The fraternity was incorporated in the State of Pennsylvania in 1905. By 1979, it had contracted to just its UMass Lowell chapter and North Carolina State chapter. However, in 1998 the UMass Dartmouth chapter was reactivated, only to be subsequently shuttered again.

In 1980, Steven Call, a pledge of Delta Kappa Phi at the University of Massachusetts Lowell died after falling ill as the result of an intense program of hazing-related calisthenics he had been required to perform.

The character of the fraternity has significantly differed from school to school. Despite its origin as a professional textile engineering fraternity, many of its chapters had evolved to become social fraternities with some characteristics of a professional fraternity. While the existing Lowell chapter is social, the now-dormant chapters at North Carolina State and Georgia Tech had been primarily oriented as professional fraternities. The Beta chapter owns a chapter house.

Although a social fraternity, Delta Kappa Phi's origin as a professional fraternity makes it the oldest textile fraternity in America.

== Symbols ==
The fraternity's colors are royal purple and white. Its badge is diamond-shaped. Historically, it published a semi-annual Bulletin and a directory.

== Chapters ==
Following is a list of Delta Kappa Phi chapters. Active chapters noted in bold, inactive chapters noted in italics.

Chapter	Charter date and range	Institution	Location	Status	Ref.
Alpha	November 16, 1899 – 1969	Thomas Jefferson University	Philadelphia, Pennsylvania	Inactive	(Note: Chapter was formed at the Philadelphia Textile School. which became Philadelphia University and is now Thomas Jefferson University.)
**Beta**	1902	University of Massachusetts Lowell	Lowell, Massachusetts	Active	(Note: Chapter formed at the Lowell Textile School, now University of Massachusetts Lowell.)
Gamma	1917–1917	Rhode Island School of Design	Providence, Rhode Island	Inactive	
Delta	1917–19xx ?, 1998–199x ?	University of Massachusetts Dartmouth	New Bedford, Massachusetts	Inactive	(Note: Chapter formed at the New Bedford Textile School, now part of UMass Dartmouth.)
Kappa	1948–2012	North Carolina State University	Raleigh, North Carolina	Inactive	
Theta	1949–1971	Georgia Tech	Atlanta, Georgia	Inactive	

== Notable members ==
- Don Trahan (UMass Dartmouth), professional golfer

== See also ==
- Phi Psi (professional)
- Professional fraternities and sororities
