= Donal O'Sullivan =

Donal O'Sullivan may refer to:

- Donal O'Sullivan (artist) (1945–1991), Irish artist
- Donal Cam O'Sullivan Beare (1561–1613), last independent ruler of the O'Sullivan Beara clan
- Donal O'Sullivan (Gaelic footballer) (1930–2001), Irish Gaelic football player
- Donal O'Sullivan (politician) (1893–1973), Irish senator
- Donal O'Sullivan (priest) (1890–1916), Irish Catholic priest

== See also ==
- Donie O'Sullivan (journalist)
