= Broughton High School, Edinburgh =

Broughton High School
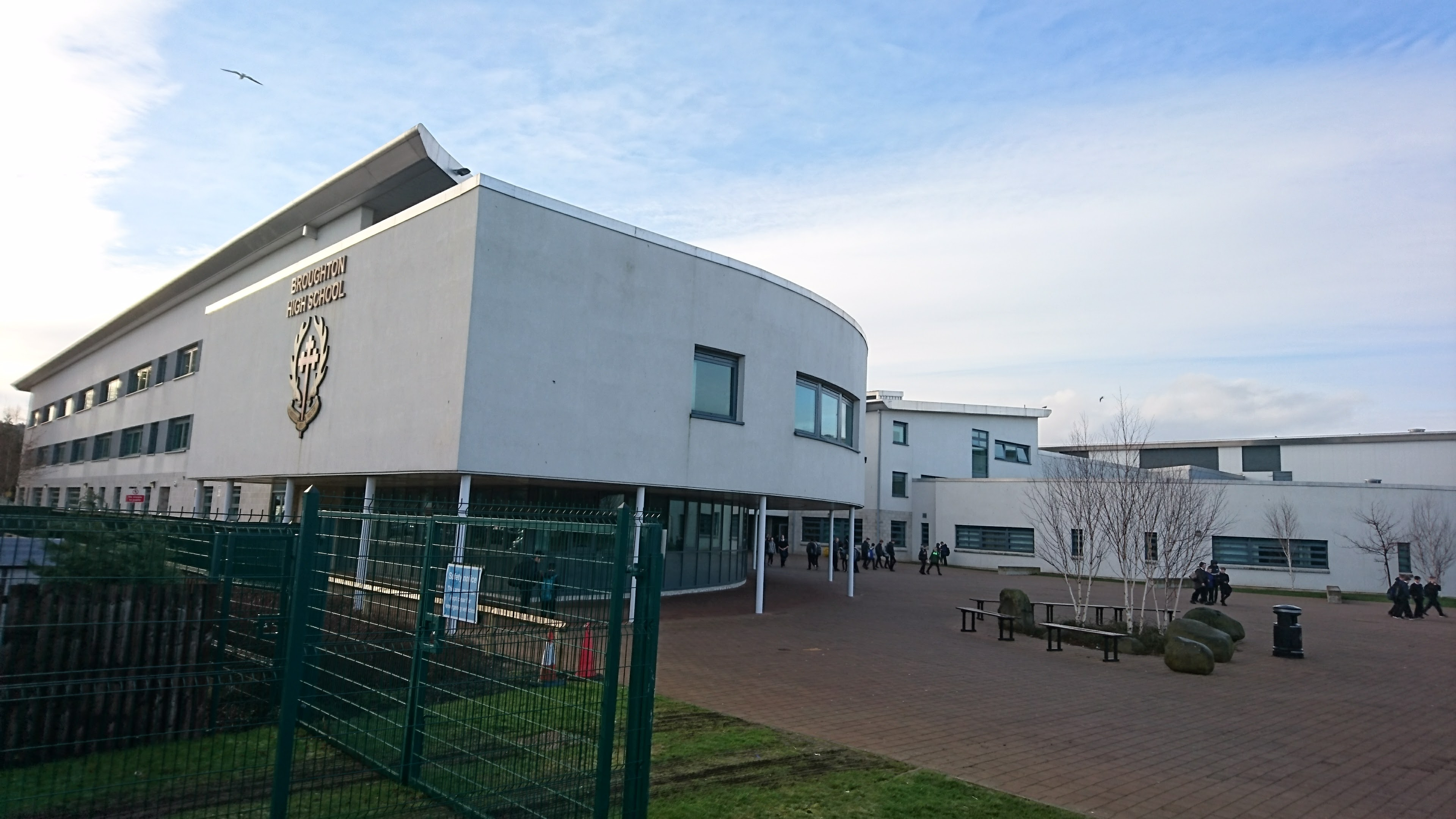

Location
- 29 East Fettes Avenue; Edinburgh, City of Edinburgh, EH4 1EG; Scotland; 55°57′37.58″N 3°13′17.36″W

Information
- Type: State Comprehensive
- Motto: Fortiter et Recte
- Established: 1887
- Local authority: City of Edinburgh Council
- Headteacher: Roberta Porter
- Staff: approx. 110
- Age: 11 to 18
- Enrolment: 1260
- Houses: Napier, Adam, Scott, Raeburn, and most recently Thorne
- Colours: White, black, red and yellow
- Website: http://www.broughton.edin.sch.uk

Broughton High School is a secondary school located in the north of Edinburgh, Scotland. In 2009, the building at Inverleith was replaced with a building funded by a public–private partnership. The school is currently situated next to Inverleith Park, in the Stockbridge neighbourhood of Edinburgh but was formerly in Broughton. The poet Hugh MacDiarmid attended what was then the Broughton Higher Grade School between 1908 and 1911.

== Description ==
In 2016 the school was named in Tatler's list of top state schools.

The school is home to a specialised music department: the City of Edinburgh Music School which nearly faced closure in 2018. Along with the music school Broughton has a specialist dance department. Broughton is also one of seven schools in Scotland chosen by the Scottish Football Association to support talented young footballers with extra coaching. As of 2018, the dedicated coach for the young players at Broughton is former Hibernian player Keith Wright.

The school's motto Fortiter et Recte is Latin for 'strongly and rightly'.

According to the Scottish Government's Scottish Index of Multiple Deprivation statistics Broughton High School is the most socio-economically diverse school in the City of Edinburgh.

The Senior Leadership Team in July 2024 consisted of the Headteacher (John J. Wilson) and three Deputy Headteachers. The school also has a Director of Music and a Business Manager. In

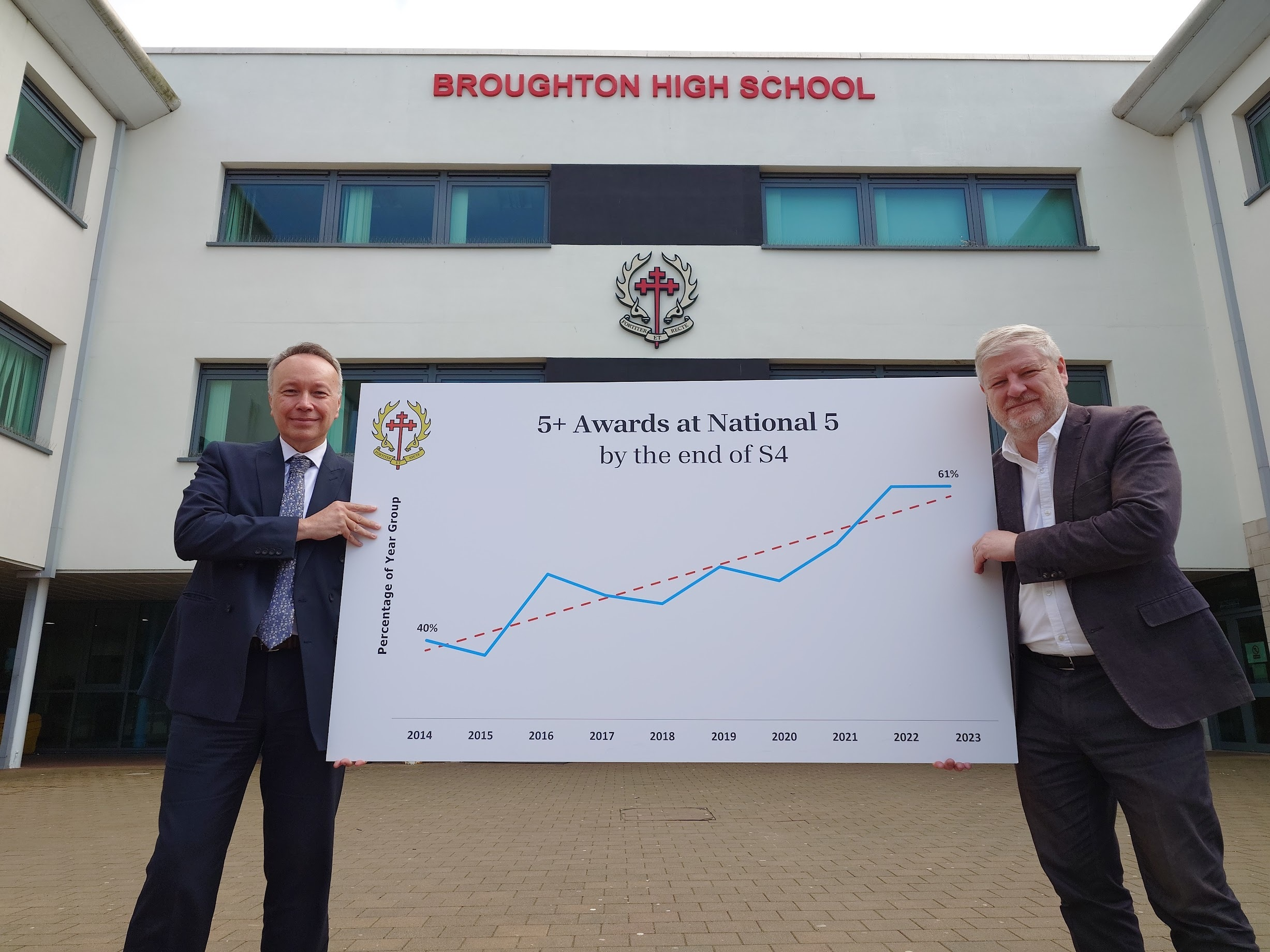

In May 2024 Angus Robertson MSP for Edinburgh Central visited Broughton High School. Mr Robertson commended the school for its sustained improvements in attainment for the since 2014.

On 28 September the Headteacher was invited as a Local Hero to the 25th Anniversary of the opening of the Scottish Parliament.

Scottish Parliament 25th Anniversary Celebrating Local Heroes

== HMI(E) report ==
In the last report, issued in September 2011, Her Majesty's Inspectorate of Education concluded that areas of strength were the school's leadership, care and welfare and specialist provisions. It stated that development was required on areas such as overall achievement, expectations and consistency.

In February 2014, the school received a follow-up report which concluded that improvements had been made. The report stated that S4-S6 attainment in 2013 was the highest in the last three years.

== Notable alumni ==
- John Beckett, Lord Justice Clerk of Scotland
- Martyn Bennett, bagpiper
- Alan Bold, Critic and Poet
- William Bosi, professional rock climber
- Danny Denholm, footballer
- Mary Fee, Scottish Labour Party politician
- John Gillies, anaesthetist
- Lisa Kerr, businesswoman and principal of Gordounstoun
- Shirley Manson, lead singer of Garbage
- Hugh MacDiarmid, Scottish Poet
- Sean McKirdy, footballer
- Ruaridh Mollica, actor
- David Murray, Entrepreneur, Scottish Businessman
- Angus Robertson SNP politician
- Sean Smith, Lord Harrower, judge of the Supreme Courts
- Tommy Smith, saxophonist, composer
- Emma Watson, Footballer,
- Donald Cumming Wilson, chemist
