= Ethan Greenidge =

American football player (born 1997)

No. 73
- Position: Offensive tackle

Personal information
- Born: September 10, 1997 (age 29); Flanders, New York, U.S.
- Listed height: 6 ft 4 in (1.93 m)
- Listed weight: 335 lb (152 kg)

Career information
- College: Villanova (2015–2018)
- NFL draft: 2019: undrafted

Career history
- New Orleans Saints (2019–2022); Atlanta Falcons (2023); Arlington Renegades (2025)*
- * Offseason or practice squad member only

Awards and highlights
- 2× Second-team All-CAA (2017, 2018)

Career NFL statistics as of 2023
- Games played: 15
- Stats at Pro Football Reference

Ethan Greenidge (born September 10, 1997) is an American professional football offensive tackle. He played college football for the Villanova Wildcats. He has also played for the New Orleans Saints and Atlanta Falcons of the National Football League (NFL).

== College career ==
Greenidge was a member of the Villanova Wildcats for four seasons. He became a starter at tackles midway through his freshman year. Greenidge finished his collegiate career with 43 consecutive games started and was named second-team All-Colonial Athletic Association as a junior and as a senior.

== Professional career ==
Pre-draft measurables
Height	Weight	Arm length	Hand span
6 ft 4 3/8 in (1.94 m)	327 lb (148 kg)	34 3/4 in (0.88 m)	10 3/8 in (0.26 m)
All values from NFL Combine

=== New Orleans Saints ===
Greenidge was signed by the New Orleans Saints as an undrafted free agent on April 27, 2019. He made the Saints' 53-man roster out of training camp but did not play in any games and was listed inactive for the entire season. Greenidge made the active roster again in 2020 and made his NFL debut on September 13, 2020, in the season opener against the Tampa Bay Buccaneers.

On August 24, 2021, Greenidge was placed on injured reserve. He was placed on injured reserve again on August 15, 2022.

=== Atlanta Falcons ===
On April 17, 2023, Greenidge signed with the Atlanta Falcons. He was placed on injured reserve on August 3, 2023.

=== Arlington Renegades ===
On December 2, 2024, Greenidge signed with the Arlington Renegades of the United Football League (UFL).
