= Domnall Ua Briain (disambiguation) =

Domnall Ua Briain and Domhnall Ua Briain may refer to:

- Domnall Gerrlámhach (died 1135), King of Dublin
- Domnall mac Taidc (died 1115), King of the Isles, King of Thomond
- Domnall Mór Ua Briain (died 1194), King of Thomond

== See also ==
- Donal O'Brien (disambiguation)
