= Donald Marmen =

Canadian politician

Member of the Legislative Assembly of New Brunswick
- In office November 1984 – 1987
- Preceded by: Gérald Clavette
- Succeeded by: Gérald Clavette
- Constituency: Madawaska Centre

Personal details
- Party: Progressive Conservative Party of New Brunswick

Donald Marmen is a former Canadian politician. He served in the Legislative Assembly of New Brunswick from 1984 to 1987 as a Progressive Conservative member from the constituency of Madawaska Centre.
