= Donald P. Kent =

Donald P. Kent (1916–1972) was an American sociologist who served as a head of the sociology department at Pennsylvania State University.

== Biography ==
Kent earned a bachelor's degree from West Chester State College in 1940. Later, he received a master's degree from Temple University and a doctorate from the University of Pennsylvania in 1950. That same year, he joined the faculty at the University of Connecticut, where he would later serve as the director of the Institute of Gerontology.

In 1961, Kent transitioned to public service, accepting a position as the director of the Office of Aging within the U.S. Department of Health, Education and Welfare. By 1963, he was the head of the newly formed U.S. Office of Aging. He was also a participant in the first White House Conference on Aging.

In addition to his numerous publications on gerontology, Kent authored The Refugee Intellectual: The Americanization of the Immigrants of 1933–41.

Donald P. Kent Award is named after him.
