= Don Cherry (American football) =

American football player (born 1994)

No. 48
- Position: Linebacker

Personal information
- Born: September 27, 1994 (age 32); Trumbull, Connecticut, U.S.
- Listed height: 6 ft 2 in (1.88 m)
- Listed weight: 240 lb (109 kg)

Career information
- High school: Trumbull (CT)
- College: Villanova
- NFL draft: 2016: undrafted

Career history
- Chicago Bears (2016)*; Philadelphia Eagles (2016–2017)*
- * Offseason or practice squad member only
- Stats at Pro Football Reference

Don Cherry (born September 27, 1994) is an American professional canine behaviorist and former football player. He played college football at Villanova.

== College career ==
Cherry concluded his college career as a three-time all-conference and All-American selection, becoming one of only six linebackers to do so under Wildcats head coach Andy Talley. The Trumbull, Connecticut native totaled 331 tackles, 46.5 tackles for loss, 14 sacks, seven forced fumbles and two fumble recoveries in 46 games at Villanova.

Cherry earned second-team STATS FCS All-America honors and first-team All-CAA accolades as a senior in 2015 after registering 88 tackles, a team-leading 12.5 tackles for loss, three sacks, two forced fumbles and a fumble recovery in 11 starts. He tied for fourth in the CAA in tackles for loss and ranked ninth in total tackles. Cherry also contributed to a defense in 2015 that ranked second in the league in total defense (330.1 yards per game) and pass defense (171.4 yards per game) and rush defense (77.2 yards per game), and second in scoring defense (16.09 points per game).

As a junior in 2014, Cherry garnered first-team All-America honors from the Sports Network, Associated Press and Walter Camp Foundation, while also being recognized as an All-CAA first-team honoree, a Capital One second-team Academic All-American and as the CAA Football Student-Athlete of the Year. He started all 14 games and racked up team and career-highs of 134 tackles, 21.5 tackles for loss, 10 sacks and five forced fumbles. His 134 tackles stands as the fifth-best single-season mark in school history. Cherry also contributed to a defense in 2015 that ranked first in the league in total defense (249.1 yards per game) and pass defense (171.4 yards per game), and rush defense (85.5 yards per game) and in scoring defense (15.0 points per game).

Cherry was also honored as a third-team All-American selection, as well as a CAA All-Academic choice in 2013 when he led the team with 99 tackles and 12.5 tackles for loss, while adding four sacks.

== Professional career ==
Cherry signed a rookie free agent contract with the Chicago Bears in 2016. He was released on July 1, 2016.

Cherry signed a rookie free agent contract with the Philadelphia Eagles in 2016. He was released on September 3, 2016, and was signed to the practice squad. He signed a reserve/future contract with the team on January 2, 2017.

On September 1, 2017, Cherry was waived by the Eagles. He was re-signed to the practice squad on October 25, 2017. He was released on November 7, 2017.
