= Donal O'Sullivan (artist) =

Irish artist

- Born: 1945
- Died: 1991 (aged 45–46)
- Known for: Portraits

Donal O'Sullivan (1945–1991) was a Dublin born visual artist whose specialty was portraiture. He initially studied architecture in DIT Bolton Street, but soon became disillusioned with it and went onto NCAD Dublin to study sculpture. It was not sculpture that he was noted for, and his talent as a draughtsman won him the prestigious Taylor Prize in both 1967 and 1968. He was involved in the student protests at the time that led to the moving of NCAD from its inadequate home in Kildare Street to its current location in Dublin 8. Straight out of college, he had several sell out one man shows in the Davis Gallery. These were followed by similarly successful shows in the Neptune Gallery and the Lad Lane Gallery, among others. O'Sullivan suffered poor mental health, and died by suicide in 1991.
