= Donaldo Méndez =

Venezuelan baseball player (born 1978)

Donaldo Mendez
- Shortstop
- Born: June 7, 1978 (age 48); Barquisimeto, Lara State, Venezuela
- Batted: Right Threw: Right

MLB debut
- April 5, 2001, for the San Diego Padres

Last MLB appearance
- July 6, 2003, for the San Diego Padres

MLB statistics
- Batting average: .183
- Home runs: 3
- Runs batted in: 14
- Stats at Baseball Reference

Teams
- San Diego Padres (2001, 2003)

Donaldo Alfonso Méndez (born June 7, 1978) is a Venezuelan former professional baseball player. A shortstop, he played parts of two seasons in Major League Baseball for the San Diego Padres in 2001 and 2003.

In a two-year career, Méndez was a .183 hitter with three home runs and 14 RBI in 72 games, but showed strong fielding skills. He finished his career playing for the Long Island Ducks of the independent Atlantic League in 2008.

== See also ==
- List of Major League Baseball players from Venezuela
