= Donald Thomas Hornstein =

American law professor

- Born: Donald Thomas Hornstein
- Education: UCLA; University of Oregon
- Occupation: Law professor
- Website: https://law.unc.edu/people/donald-thomas-hornstein/

Donald Thomas Hornstein is the Thomas F. Taft Distinguished Professor of Law at the University of North Carolina School of Law, where he is also Director of the Center on Climate, Energy, Environment, and Economics. In addition, Professor Hornstein holds an appointment in the a UNC College of Arts & Sciences's Environment, Energy & Ecology Program, and teaches regularly at the Nicholas School of the Environment at Duke University.

== Education ==
- J.D. (Order of the Coif), University of Oregon School of Law (1981)
- B.A. (magna cum laude, special distinction in History), University of California at Los Angeles (1972) While at UCLA he won the 1971 National Intercollegiate Debate championship.

== Massive Open Online Course ==
In the fall of 2013 and again in the summer of 2015, Hornstein taught one of the university's first Massive Open Online Courses, An Introduction to Environmental Law and Policy.

== Publications ==
- Environmental Law and Policy (UNC Press 2013)
- Climate Systems and Legal Systems, in The Report of the UNC lLimate Change Committee, November, 2008.
- The Data Wars, Adaptive Management, and the Irony of 'Sound Science' in Rescuing Science From Politics: Regulation and the Distortion of Scientific Research (Cambridge University Press, 2006). (Q125 .R4178 2006)
- Reclaiming Clean Science and Scientific Freedom, in A new Progressive Agenda For Public Health and the Environment: A Project of the Center For Progressive Regulation (Carolina Academic Press 2005). (RA566.3 .N487 2005)
- The New Sound Science Gamut: The Shelby Amendment, the Data Quality Act, and White House Peer Review, in Clean Science (University of Maryland Law Review and the Center for Progressive Regulation, 2004).
- Insurance as Policy in the Water-Energy Nexus, U. of Richmond Law Review. (forthcoming, Spring 2014).
- The Balkanization of CAT Property Insurance: Financing and Fragmentation in Storm Risks 11 Rutgers Journal of Law and Public Policy. 9, Fall 2013. (Westlaw, Lexis/Nexis, Hein)
- Resiliency, Adaptation, and the Upsides of Ex Post Lawmaking, 89 North Carolina Law Review. 1549, 2011. (Westlaw, Lexis/Nexis, Hein)
- The Environmental Role of Agriculture in an Era of Carbon Caps, 20 Health Matrix 145, 2010. (Westlaw, Lexis/Nexis, SSRN, Hein)
- The Road Also Taken: Lessons from Organic Agriculture for Market- and Risk-Based Regulation, 56 Duke Law Journal. 1541, 2007. (Westlaw, Lexis/Nexis, Hein, BEPress)
- Complexity Theory, Adaptation, and Administrative Law, 54 DUKE L.J. 913, 2005. (Westlaw, Lexis/Nexis, Hein, BEPress)
- Accounting for Science: The Independence of Public Research in the New Subterranean Administrative Law, Law & Contemporary Problems. Autumn 2003 at 227. (Westlaw, Lexis/Nexis, SSRN, Hein, BEPress)
- From Beef to Bove: Are Cultural Preferences to International Trade Legitimate, Global View, Spring 2001.
- Environmental Sustainability and Environmental Justice at the International Level: Traces of Tension and Traces of Synergy, 9 Duke Environmental Law and Policy F. 291, 1999. (Westlaw, Lexis/Nexis, Hein, BEPress)
- Self-Interest, Politics, and the Environment: A Response to Professor Schroeder, 9 Duke Environmental Law and Policy F. 61, 1999. (Westlaw, Lexis/Nexis, Hein, BEPress)
- Lessons from Federal Pesticide Regulation on the Paradigms and Politics of Environmental Law Reform, 10 Yale Journal on Regulation. 369, 1993. (Westlaw, Lexis/Nexis, Hein)
- Reclaiming Environmental Law: A Normative Critique of Comparative Risk Analysis, 92 Columbia Law Review. 562, 1992. (Westlaw, Lexis/Nexis, Hein)
- Indian Fishing Rights Return to Spawn: Toward Environmental Protection of Treaty Fisheries, 61 Oregon Law Review. 93, 1982.
