= Donald Wallace Gordon =

American gymnast and inventor

- Born: February 4, 1932; Los Angeles, California, U.S.
- Died: April 11, 2016 (aged 84); Springville, Utah, U.S.
- Education: Brigham Young University; California State University, Northridge
- Occupations: Inventor, entrepreneur
- Website: www.gordonap.com

Donald Wallace (Wally) Gordon (4 February 1932 – 11 April 2016) was an American gymnast and inventor who is notable for inventing the first landing mats, incline mats, octagons and all the other foam shapes that currently fill gymnastic schools. Gordon also invented the foam landing pits for pole-vaulters and high jumpers used in all Track and Field competitions including the 1968 Olympics, where they made their first Olympic debut.

He created the first constant flow "Moon Bounce" air units and developed closed air recreation products for water and land. He has worked as a consultant for trampoline inventor George Nissen to design next generation landing pits for his company. Gordon has over 300 products on the market and holds approximately 40 patents.

== Early life and education ==
Born in Los Angeles, California to Henry Fairfax Gordon and Anne Marie Gordon, Gordon grew up during the Great Depression and World War II.

Gordon was a champion gymnast in high school at Garfield high in Los Angeles, CA where he graduated from in June 1951. That same month he joined the Air Force to serve for four years during the Korean War where he served as a survival instruction and rescue medic stationed in Saudi Arabia. After service in the military, he attended Brigham Young University where he majored in Biology and Physical Fitness, championship gymnast, taught gymnastics and earned a certificate as a driving instructor. He transferred to California State University, Northridge where he earned his master's degree in education to become a teacher and graduated in 1958.

In the late 1960s Gordon co-authored four books with Dr. Bryant J. Cratty, head of the Special Needs Department at USC, that focused on the early childhood development of kids with special needs.

== Inventions ==
=== Port-A-Pit ===
While working with his discus and shot put replacements, Gordon would watch high jumpers and pole vaulters landing in sawdust and thought there must be a better way. Noticing some scrap foam, he decided to create a container for the foam and structure it into a landing pit. It was this innovation that led to the development of the Fosbury Flop style of High Jump by Dick Fosbury and allowed for dramatic improvements in height for both Pole Vaulting and High Jumping. Gordon was able to place the first foam pits in the 1968 Summer Olympics, and they have been in every Olympic Games since.

=== Skill Development Equipment ===
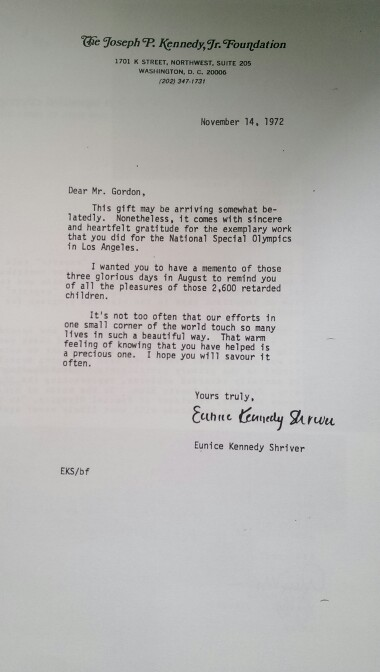
Thank you letter from Eunice Kennedy Shriver for help with the Special Olympics

In 1969, Gordon wanted to create products to teach unskilled gymnasts in a safer manner. By removing fear associated with injury, the gymnasts were able to develop more quickly. These items were created with shaped foam with a vinyl cover and included items such as the incline mat, the connectable vault cylinders, jousting units and floor mats, to name a few. Gordon called El Monte High School where he used to teach and asked if he could try them out with some of the gymnasts at the school. The school suggested he also try them with some of their students in special education and the results were phenomenal. With special needs children, the process is focused on success, the more success they have, the better the children advance. With Gordon's inventions, kids with braces on their legs and other serious issues, were able to do front rolls, back rolls, climb, fall and have fun safely. More importantly, they succeeded. The school said the improvement in their attitude and success was incredible. Over 160 products were designed that are in use throughout the world today.

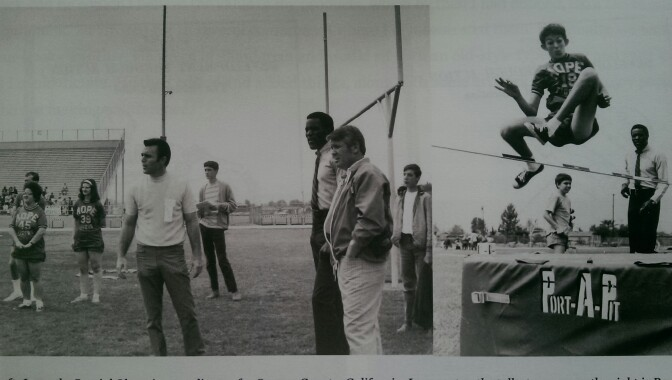
Special Olympics with Rafer Johnson and Don Gordon

Because of the success with the SDE line, Gordon reached out to Eunice Kennedy Shriver and the Special Olympics and ended up coordinating the 1970 Special Olympics in Southern California and working with Olympic Decathlete Rafer Johnson at the games.

=== Living Designs ===
In 1967 Gordon became interested with injection mold plastics. As an accomplished sculptor, he started to build different functional animal shapes to be used as chairs, stools, toyboxes, flotation devices or anything a child could dream up. The company continued until 1974 when plastic prices exploded due to rising oil prices.

=== Nissen/Gordon ===
In 1975 George Nissen, who invented the trampoline in the 1930s, contacted Gordon to consult with his company on the development of next generation landing pits and other products. This joint venture was called Nissen/Gordon and lasted through the end of 1977 when George sold his company and the new owners were not interested in trampolines and landing pits. Gordon had already been working on his own version of Nissen's trampoline game Spaceball and convinced Nissen to sell him the rights for $1.00 to continue developing the game, which eventually became Hi-Ball and later Aeroball.

=== Hi-Ball ===
1978 saw the development of the first Hi-Ball unit. A company in Tallahassee Florida had developed the first Round Trampoline, which Gordon thought would be perfect for his idea. He flew to their facility with his 15-year-old son where they worked on building the housing and frames to create the first ever Hi-Ball. The design was a radical departure from the Spaceball game he had licensed from Nissen, the primary difference was safety. Despite the great safety record, excessive litigation from every bump and scrape led to the discontinuing of the single trampoline design and the emergence of Aeroball with individual trampolines a few years later.

In 1982, Hi-Ball was part of the Battle of the Network Stars.

Some notable installations were at Disneyland and Knott's Berry Farm.

=== Aeroball ===
1983 introduced the next evolution of Hi-Ball as Aeroball. The primary difference was that each player now had their own trampoline and there was a pitchback net around the top. This was originally intended to compensate for the lack of one strategy move from the single trampoline design, namely "stealing" a bounce. The pitchback net was eventually discontinued as it was a significant amount of work to build and install and saw little use.

=== PlayMaze ===
In 1989 Gordon had 2 young sons, which inspired him to use the base Junior Hi-Ball concept and create multiple layers and access paths into a product he called PlayMaze. In 1990 he licensed PlayMaze to Keiser for 10 years, where they had tremendous success selling these play units to places like Burger King, McDonald's, 24 Hour Fitness, auto dealerships and even jewelry store chains for their play centers for children. As of 2016 there are still many of these units still deployed throughout the United States.

=== Airplay ===
In the late 1960s, Gordon inadvertently invented the constant air flow inflatable with "Moonbounce" which began the whole bounce house revolution and also led to the larger scale inflatables used to jump off of buildings. This was done with premier Hollywood stuntman Dar Robinson with whom Gordon became lifelong friends until Dars untimely death in 1986.

Over time Gordon was frustrated with the limitations of this methodology, as they required constant electricity for blowers and units were difficult to move. The next evolution for him, was to make smaller units with closed cell systems that did not require constant electricity, that could be blown up like a life raft. These units were easier to move, setup and take down. This allowed for more variety and shapes. A regular truck or van can easily hold up to ten different units, providing a large variety of activities. You can even use a simple car battery to power the blower to inflate them.

=== Gordon's Action Products ===
In 2005 Gordon decided to consolidate his various products and companies under a single roof as Gordon's Action Products. The product lines generally fall under the Aeroball family of products and the Airplay family or products. A subset of Airplay is focused on Special Needs children specifically. Gordon's products are in use and available around the world to this day.

== Death ==
On April 11, 2016, Gordon died after an eight-year battle with cancer.
