= Phi Psi (professional) =

American textile professional fraternity

- ΦΨ
- Founded: March 18, 1903; 123 years ago Philadelphia College of Textiles & Science, Philadelphia, Pennsylvania, U.S.
- Type: Professional
- Affiliation: Independent
- Status: Active
- Emphasis: Textiles
- Scope: National
- Motto: Semper ad perfectum
- Colors: Black and Gold
- Flower: Yellow Tea Rose
- Publication: The Phi Psi Quarterly
- Chapters: 3
- Members: 6,000+ lifetime
- Headquarters: Raleigh, North Carolina; United States

Phi Psi (ΦΨ) is an American professional fraternity in the field of textiles and manufacturing engineering. It was established at the Philadelphia College of Textiles & Science in 1903.

== History ==
Phi Psi was established as a professional textile fraternity on March 18, 1903 at the Philadelphia College of Textiles & Science, in Philadelphia, Pennsylvania. Its five founders were Robert M. Baeny, Paul Benninghofen, Henry W. Eddy, Harold H. Hart, and Charles A. Kalenbach.

Established at the turn of the 20th century, Phi Psi had three aims:

1. to promote fellowship among men of textile colleges and universities with textile departments;
2. to assist, by every honorable means, the advancement of its members.

The fraternity expanded to several Massachusetts textile schools, then the center of textile manufacturing in the United States. Beta chapter was formed at Southeastern Massachusetts Dartmouth, followed by Gamma chapter at Lowell Tech in 1904. Chapter naming traditions may have diverged: the Gamma chapter at Lowell Tech may have inserted the Gamma from its name into its national name, calling itself the Phi Gamma Psi fraternity.

The fraternity's first alumni chapter was established in 1914 in Boston, Massachusetts. When the nation's textile industry center shifted to the southern states, chapters were established in Georgia, North Carolina, South Carolina, Texas, and Alabama. A total of ten collegiate chapters were formed, along with twelve alumni chapters.

Members from Alpha chapter began a search for a national social fraternity to join. In what appears to be a friendly schism, a majority or all of its members formed a separate organization from Phi Psi on November 14, 1964 when they were accepted as the Pennsylvania Omicron chapter of Sigma Phi Epsilon. Yet the Alpha chapter of Phi Psi continued independently on the campus, remaining active today.

In 1991, the fraternity had 6,000 members. The fraternity is now coed. It held its 111th convention in Atlanta, Georgia in 2018.

== Symbols ==
Phi Psi's motto is Semper ad perfectum. Its badge is described as a diamond-shaped emblem with a gold border andfour perpendicular gold bars on a black face. The Greek letters Φ and Ψ are in the center, rendered in gold.

Its colors are black and gold. The fraternity's flower is the Yellow Tea Rose. Its quarterly publication is The Phi Psi Quarterly.

== Chapters ==
Following is a list of Phi Psi chapters. Active chapters noted in bold. Inactive chapters and institutions are noted in italics.

Chapter	Charter date and range	Institution	Location	Status	Ref.
**Alpha**	March 18, 1903 – November 14, 1964; xxxx ?	Thomas Jefferson University	Philadelphia, Pennsylvania	Active	(Note: The chapter formed at the Philadelphia Textile School, later known as Philadelphia University. The university merged with Thomas Jefferson University in 2017.) (Note: A portion of the chapter's members joined the social fraternity Sigma Phi Epsilon in 1964.)
Beta	1904	University of Massachusetts Dartmouth	Dartmouth, Massachusetts	Inactive	(Note: The chapter was established at Southeastern Massachusetts at Dartmouth, which merged into the University of Massachusetts system in 1991, assuming the name University of Massachusetts Dartmouth.)
Gamma	1904	University of Massachusetts Lowell	Lowell, Massachusetts	Consolidated ?	(Note: The chapter was established at Lowell Technological Institute. Lowell Tech and Lowell State merged in 1975 to form the University of Lowell, which changed its name to the University of Massachusetts Lowell in 1991. Today, Lowell Tech's campus is known as the North Campus of UMass Lowell.)
Delta	1909–19xx ?	Bradford Durfee College of Technology	Fall River, Massachusetts	Consolidated ?	(Note: After multiple mergers, Bradford Durfee College of Technology became part of University of Massachusetts Dartmouth in 1961.)
**Eta**	May 1924	North Carolina State University	Raleigh, North Carolina	Active	
Theta	January 10, 1925 – after 2019	Georgia Tech	Atlanta, Georgia	Inactive	
Iota	May 1927 – after 2022	Clemson University	Clemson, South Carolina	Inactive	
Kappa	February 1931 – c. 2005	Texas Tech University	Lubbock, Texas	Inactive	(Note: The chapter closed after the closure of a textile engineering program, which resulted in a lack of textile students.)
**Lambda**	1936	Auburn University	Auburn, Alabama	Active	
Mu	1961–19xx ?	Institute of Textile Technology	Charlottesville, Virginia	Inactive	(Note: The Institute of Textile Technology and the Mu chapter were originally located in Charlottesville, Virginia. The school relocated to the Wilson College of Textiles at North Carolina State in Raleigh, North Carolina, in 2003.)

== Alumni chapters ==
- Boston, MA
- New York, NY
- Philadelphia, PA
- Providence, RI
- Chicago, IL
- Fall River, MA
- Greenville, SC
- Charlotte, NC
- Albany, NY
- New Bedford, MA
- Lanett, AL
- Atlanta, GA

== See also ==
- Delta Kappa Phi, professional, textiles
- Professional fraternities and sororities
- Sigma Tau Sigma, honor society, textile engineering
