= Don Christopher =

American farmer (1934–2022)

Donald Clair Christopher (August 4, 1934 – December 12, 2022) was an American farmer. He was the founder of Christopher Ranch, the leading producer of fresh garlic in the United States.

He was one of the founders of the Fresh Garlic Producers Association and the Gilroy Garlic Festival. He was known for his philanthropic work in the community of Gilroy, California. He was one of the founders of the Gilroy Garlic Festival, a world renowned festival that raised over 12 million for the local community. In addition to this, he donated millions to local causes, including contributions to help build Christopher High School, a local school the district decided to name after him because of his generosity in its development.
