= Donald Cumming Wilson =

Scottish manufacturing chemist

Donald Cumming Wilson FRSE FRIC (1898–1950) was a 20th-century Scottish manufacturing chemist. During the Second World War he controlled one of the main producers of military painkillers.

== Life ==
He was born in Tranent in East Lothian on 3 January 1898. He was educated in Edinburgh at Broughton High School. He then studied science at Edinburgh University, graduating BSc in 1919.

He obtained a post with T & H Smith Ltd at Blandfield Works on Wheatfield Road in west Edinburgh. He worked there all his life, becoming Executive Director in 1941 and Managing director in 1946. T & H Smith were a firm of manufacturing chemists and druggists, originating in Leith. They specialised in painkillers: Morphine, Apomorphine and Diamorphine. They also made surgical dressings. During the First World War they were one of the main British suppliers. Becoming inadvertently wealthy they acquired the rival company Glasgow Apothecaries in 1919.

In 1926 they expanded to Canada, Australia and New Zealand.

During the Second World War the company was again obliged to expand, this time under Wilson's direction.

Donald was elected a Fellow of the Royal Society of Edinburgh in 1945. His proposers were James Watt, James Pickering Kendall, David Bain, and Edmund Percival.

He died on 4 August 1950 at Boat of Garten.

In 1960 the huge company merged with J F MacFarlan & Co to create the group MacFarlan Smith.
