= Donald Roller Wilson =

American painter

Two Sweet Singers in the Woods, by Donald Roller Wilson, 1973, oil on canvas, 167.6 x 152.4 cm.

Donald Roller Wilson (born 1938) is an American artist, known for his paintings of people and anthropomorphized chimpanzees, orangutans, cats, and dogs, set in southern gothic interiors, twilight forests, and nocturnal graveyards, often amidst complex still lifes or floral arrangements, with levitating pickles, olives, asparagus, wooden matches, and cigarette butts. His images are often comical and at times disquieting. His paintings are executed using techniques and a style reminiscent of the old masters, or what the artist himself has called "kind of Victorian". He gained national recognition in the mid-1970s and his work is included in the collections of several museums throughout the United States.

== Life ==
The artist wrote "Roller Wilson was born in Houston, Texas on November 23, 1938, 10:55 A.M. His mother, a descendent of German–Dutch Jews who prospered during the Oklahoma Land Rush, had run off and married his father, an Episcopalian wildcatter who had been laying pipe in the Oklahoma plains." He was the youngest of three siblings and significantly younger than his brother and sister, in effect growing up as an only child. His family moved to Nebraska about 1944 where his father started a business that made combine harvesters, and then to Wichita, Kansas, in 1945. His earliest involvement with art was sign painting on trucks. He attended Wichita State University where he earned both B.A. and M.F.A. degrees. After completing his education he spent one year (1966–67) as an assistant professor at Peru State College, Nebraska. He moved to Fayetteville, Arkansas, in the summer of 1967, "expecting it would be a short-lived venture" as a professor at the University of Arkansas, although Wilson ended up teaching at the university for eight years. In the mid-1970s he was able to devote himself to painting fulltime, and he and his wife Kathleen, also an artist, have remained in Fayetteville for well over fifty years.

== Art ==
According to The New York Times, "Donald Roller Wilson's goofy, hallucinogenic, old master-style painting of monkeys, dogs and cats dressed up in antique costumes may be kitsch, but it's high-quality kitsch, like good beach reading."

Some of the characters he has created include Cookie the Baby Orangutan, Jane the Pug Girl, Jack the Jack Russell "Terror", Loretta the Actress Cat, Miss Dog America, and Patricia the Seeing Eye Dog of Houston.

He created album cover art for musician Frank Zappa during the 1980s and 1990s. Among these: Boulez Conducts Zappa: The Perfect Stranger (1984), Francesco Zappa (1984), Them Or Us (1984), and The Old Masters box sets (1985-1987).

The artist has written about his work stating –

The dreams of my waking hours are superimposed against an almost unbroken background of imagery. I have a threshold mind, assembling materials from several conceptual sources–frontiers–welding them together. But I don't know exactly what it is that moves the directions of my thoughts, and I wonder almost constantly about the shaping spirit that works through me. For there is some forming process accompanying me which sweeps like a selective magnet across an utter chaos of patterns in my thinking, and the result is that an otherwise aimless flow of association–of mental wanderings–becomes documented. The documentations are what you see in paintings. I can say with absolute truth and authority that I am a bystander, and the things that stream together in my work set up a kind of subconscious existence of their own. And the only real control, on my part, is an ability to revive–voluntarily–that to which I have been exposed. Once, after and exhibition of my work in New York, I was quoted: "My paintings are reports which I bring home from my wanderings. They are maps." That is still true. Donald Roller Wilson (1979)

== Selected public collections ==
- Arkansas Museum of Fine Arts
- Museum of Contemporary Art, Chicago
- Blanton Museum of Art
- Brooklyn Museum
- City Museum of St. Louis
- Crystal Bridges Museum of American Art
- Hirshhorn Museum and Sculpture Garden
- Davis Museum at Wellesley College
- Museum of Contemporary Art San Diego
- Nelson-Atkins Museum of Art
- New Orleans Museum of Art
- Racine Art Museum
- Sheldon Museum of Art
- Victoria and Albert Museum
- Whitney Museum of American Art
- Wichita Art Museum

== Selected solo exhibitions ==
- 2004 Donald Roller Wilson. Phantoms of the Opera. Meyer Gallery, Scottsdale AZ
- 1998 Donald Roller Wilson: One Man Show, Wichita Art Museum, Wichita, KS
- 1997 Donald Roller Wilson: Paintings, Tacoma Art Museum, Tacoma, WA
- 1989 Donald Roller Wilson, The Huntsville Museum of Art, Huntsville, AL
- 1988 Roller: The Paintings of Donald Roller Wilson, Organized and toured by Mid-America Art Alliance, Kansas City, MO; traveled to: Arkansas Art Center, Little Rock, AR; The Fine Art Center, Nashville, TN; Oklahoma Art Center, Oklahoma City, OK; Huntsville Museum of Art, Huntsville, AL; Art Museum of South Texas, Corpus Christi, TX
- 1974 The Paintings of Donald Roller Wilson (catalogue), La Jolla Museum of Contemporary Art, La Jolla, CA
- 1970 Donald Roller Wilson, Museum of Fine Arts, Kansas City, MO
- 1970 Donald Roller Wilson, The City Arts Museum of St. Louis, St. Louis, MO
- 1969 Donald Roller Wilson, Contemporary Arts Museum, Houston, TX
- 1966 Donald Roller Wilson, Wichita Art Museum, Wichita, KS

== Bibliography ==
Monographs

- Coe, Ralph T. 1979. The Dreams of Donald Roller Wilson. Hawthorn Books, Inc. Publishers. New York, New York. 127 pp. ISBN 0801503531
- Frank, Peter. 1988. Roller: The Paintings of Donald Roller Wilson. Chronicle Books. San Francisco. 128 pp. ISBN 0877015627
- Wilson, Donald Roller. 1995. A Strong Night Wind. Wright Publishing, New York. 280 pp.ISBN 0964625407
