= Donald Williamson =

Donald Williamson may refer to:

- Don Williamson (1934–2019), American politician
- Donald I. Williamson (1922–2016), British scientist
