= Donald Keating =

British lawyer (1924–1995)

Donald Norman Keating (24 June 1924 – 1 August 1995) was a construction lawyer and legal writer. John Uff, writing in The Independent, describes him as "one of the pioneers" in the construction law field.

== Early life and education ==
Keating was born on 24 June 1924. He served with the Royal Air Force during the Second World War.

== Career ==
Keating was called to the bar at Lincoln's Inn in 1950, appointed a bencher in 1979 and a queen's counsel in 1972. He served as a recorder from 1972 to 1987 and again from 1993 to 1995, and was head of chambers at Keating Chambers during the years from 1976 to 1992.

During 1988–89 he was a member of a Department of Trade and Industry study team on professional liability in the construction industry, one of three parallel study teams established with a brief to look at this issue in various professional contexts, in the light of what had been described as "current concern about the cost and availability of professional indemnity insurance and the extent of professional civil liability for negligence".

Lord Dyson, Master of the Rolls, delivering the "Keating Lecture" in 2015, (Note: One of a series of lectures named after Donald Keating.) commented that he had served under Keating in many cases, and at times appeared against him. Dyson regretted not asking Keating what had led to his interest in construction law: he noted that both had "started at the bar doing a bit of this and a bit of that".

== Keating on Construction Contracts ==
His book Law and Practice of Building Contracts including Architects and Surveyors (1955) is an authoritative work on construction law. It is now known as Keating on Construction Contracts (in previous editions, Keating on Building Contracts).

Kim Franklin, writing in the Architects' Journal, notes, "Before the late Donald Keating QC produced his book on Building Contracts, and the law of tort really took off after Anns v Merton in the late 1970s, there was no such thing as construction law."

His advice that parties to construction contracts "should either use an unamended standard form of contract, or their own homemade contract conditions", but never a combination, has been quoted in case law, where it is noted that "attempt[ing] a mixture of both [is] usually a recipe for disaster".

== Personal life ==
Keating married his first wife, Betty Wells, in 1945. She died in 1975; they had two sons and one daughter. He married Kay Blundell-Jones in 1978: they had a son and one stepdaughter (deceased before Keating's death). He died on 1 August 1995.
