= Don Douglas (footballer) =

Australian rules footballer

Personal information
- Full name: Don Douglas
- Born: 7 October 1934 (age 92)
- Original team: State Savings Bank
- Height: 187 cm (6 ft 2 in)
- Weight: 83 kg (183 lb)

Playing career^{1}
Years	Club	Games (Goals)
1956	Hawthorn	1 (0)
- ^{1} Playing statistics correct to the end of 1956.

Don Douglas (born 7 October 1934) is a former Australian rules footballer who played with Hawthorn in the Victorian Football League (VFL).
