= D. J. Trahan =

American professional golfer (born 1980)

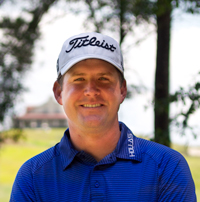

Personal information
- Full name: Donald Roland Trahan, Jr.
- Nickname: D.J.
- Nationality: United States
- Born: December 18, 1980 (age 45) Atlanta, Georgia, U.S.
- Height: 6 ft 3 in (1.91 m)
- Weight: 185 lb (84 kg; 13.2 st)

Career
- Sport: Golf
- College: Clemson University
- Turned professional: 2003
- Current tour: PGA Tour
- Professional wins: 3
- Highest ranking: 62 (October 12, 2008)

Number of wins by tour
- PGA Tour: 2
- Korn Ferry Tour: 1

Best results in major championships
- Masters Tournament: T44: 2009
- PGA Championship: T31: 2008
- U.S. Open: T4: 2008
- The Open Championship: CUT: 2009

Achievements and awards
- Ben Hogan Award: 2002

Donald Roland "D.J." Trahan Jr. (born December 18, 1980) is an American professional golfer.

== Early life ==
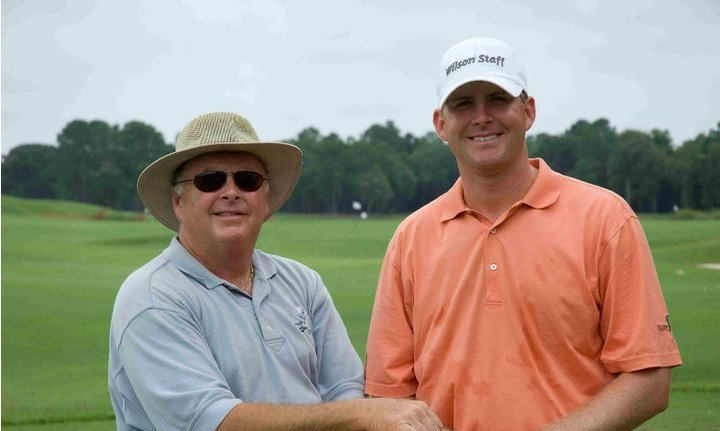
D. J. Trahan (right) and his father Don Trahan (left)

Trahan was born in Atlanta, Georgia, the son of Don Trahan. Shortly after being born his parents moved to Hilton Head Island, South Carolina where he spent his younger years playing at Harbour Town Golf Links and where he attended Hilton Head Island High School. He then moved to Spartanburg, South Carolina where he attended and graduated from Paul M. Dorman High School, playing both golf and baseball.

== Amateur career ==
Trahan attended Clemson University. He won the U.S. Amateur Public Links in 2000 and represented the United States in the 2001 Walker Cup and the 2002 Eisenhower Trophy.

During Trahan's collegiate career, Clemson won two ACC titles (2000, 2003), three NCAA East Region titles (2000, 2002, 2003), and the 2003 NCAA Division I Championship. The 2001 team was national runner-up and the 2002 team came in third place at nationals.

== Professional career ==
After turning professional in 2003, Trahan spent 2004 on the Nationwide Tour winning the final full-field event of that season at the Miccosukee Championship. He was a PGA Tour rookie in 2005 and won his first PGA Tour title at the 2006 Southern Farm Bureau Classic which was an alternate event to the WGC-American Express Championship. He won his second event at the Bob Hope Chrysler Classic by three strokes over Justin Leonard on January 20, 2008. He has featured in the top 100 of the Official World Golf Rankings.

== Amateur wins ==
- 2000 U.S. Amateur Public Links, Las Vegas Intercollegiate
- 2001 Jones Cup Invitational, South Carolina Amateur, Carpet Classic, Jerry Pate Invitational
- 2002 Azalea Invitational, Monroe Invitational, South Carolina Amateur, NCAA East Regional
- 2003 Mercedes-Benz Intercollegiate

== Awards and honors ==
- In 2000, Trahan earned the ACC Freshman of the Year
- From 2000 to 2002, Trahan was named the Carolinas Golf Association Player of the Year
- From 2000 to 2003, Trahan was a first team All-ACC member
- Trahan was an All-American from 2000 to 2003
- In 2002, Trahan was the ACC Player of the Year
- In 2002, Trahan was selected for the Ben Hogan Award, an award given to the best college golfer of the year
- In 2002, Trahan also earned the Jack Nicklaus Award
- In 2002, Trahan was named to the ACC 50-Year Anniversary Golf Team

== Professional wins (3) ==
=== PGA Tour wins (2) ===
No.	Date	Tournament	Winning score	Margin of victory	Runner-up
1	Oct 1, 2006	Southern Farm Bureau Classic	−13 (65-68-71-71=275)	Playoff	(United States) Joe Durant
2	Jan 20, 2008	Bob Hope Chrysler Classic	−26 (67-64-68-70-65=334)	3 strokes	(United States) Justin Leonard

PGA Tour playoff record (1–0)

No.	Year	Tournament	Opponent	Result
1	2006	Southern Farm Bureau Classic	(United States) Joe Durant	Won with birdie on third extra hole

=== Nationwide Tour wins (1) ===
No.	Date	Tournament	Winning score	Margin of victory	Runner-up
1	Oct 24, 2004	Miccosukee Championship	−16 (68-67-68-65=268)	4 strokes	(United States) Nick Watney

== Results in major championships ==
Tournament	2001	2002	2003	2004	2005	2006	2007	2008	2009
Masters Tournament	CUT							CUT	T44
U.S. Open						CUT		T4	CUT
The Open Championship									CUT
PGA Championship							CUT	T31	CUT

Tournament	2010	2011	2012	2013	2014	2015	2016
Masters Tournament							
U.S. Open							CUT
The Open Championship							
PGA Championship	67	CUT					

Top 10
Did not play

CUT = missed the half-way cut
"T" = tied

== Results in The Players Championship ==
Tournament	2006	2007	2008	2009	2010	2011	2012
The Players Championship	CUT	CUT	T51	CUT	CUT	CUT	DQ

CUT = missed the halfway cut
DQ = disqualified
"T" indicates a tie for a place

== Results in World Golf Championships ==
Tournament	2008	2009
Match Play		
Championship	T57	T46
Invitational	T8	
Champions		

Did not play

"T" = Tied
Note that the HSBC Champions did not become a WGC event until 2009.

== U.S. national team appearances ==
Amateur

- Walker Cup: 2001
- Eisenhower Trophy: 2002 (winners)
- Palmer Cup: 2002 (winners)

== See also ==
- 2004 PGA Tour Qualifying School graduates
- 2019 Korn Ferry Tour Finals graduates
