= Don Trahan =

American golf instructor (1949–2024)

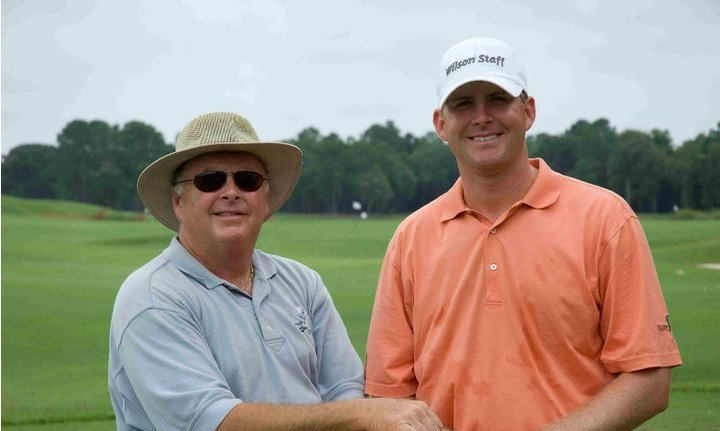
- Don and D.J. Trahan http://www.SwingSurgeon.com

Personal information
- Full name: Donald Roland Trahan
- Nicknames: "The Swing Surgeon" "Surge"
- Nationality: United States
- Born: November 13, 1949 New Bedford, Massachusetts, U.S.
- Died: June 21, 2024 (aged 74)
- Spouse: Susan Trahan
- Children: D.J. Trahan; Kimberly Owens

Career
- Sport: Golf
- College: Southeastern Massachusetts University
- Turned professional: 1973; PGA Class A Member - 1977; PGA Master Professional - 1992

Donald Roland Trahan (November 13, 1949 – June 21, 2024) was an American PGA Master Professional golf instructor. Known as "The Swing Surgeon," Trahan was the father of PGA Tour professional golfer D. J. Trahan.

== Early life ==
Trahan was born in New Bedford, Massachusetts. His father introduced him to the game of golf when he was ten years old. By the age of twelve, Trahan was a scratch golfer and a member of New Bedford Public Links, now called Whaling City Golf Club (known as The Whale).

Trahan graduated from Bishop Stang Catholic High School in 1967. He was the top player on the high school golf team all four years he attended. Trahan then attended Southeastern Massachusetts University (now University of Massachusetts, North Dartmouth) where he was again the top player on the golf team all four years he attended. He is a member of Delta Kappa Phi fraternity. He graduated in 1971 with a double major in political science and history with plans to become a corporate attorney.

Trahan met his wife, Susan, while attending college. The two married in 1973 and moved to Port Orange, Florida where Trahan began his effort to obtain his PGA Tour card. From there, Trahan took an assistant's job at Sugar Mill Country Club in New Smyrna Beach, Florida and entered into the PGA of America Apprentice Program. He earned a Class A membership in 1977.

He later achieved the status of PGA Master Professional in 1992.

== Philosophy ==
While Director of Golf Instruction for Sea Pines Resort at Harbour Town Golf Links, Trahan created a teaching center that includes a teaching certification program for all of the resort's golf instructors. His list of regular students includes a growing number of members of the PGA, LPGA, and other mini tours. He also worked with college and junior players. Trahan acquired his training methods and swing methodology through years of study with engineers, physicists, a kinesiologist and an orthopedic surgeon to learn the physics and physiology of swinging a golf club.

Prior to his work at the Sea Pines/Harbour Town Golf Links, Trahan ran golf schools in Florida and was head golf professional at Pinetree Country Club in Kennesaw, Georgia. In the mid-1990s, Trahan was co-owner and Director of Golf at the Links O'Tryon in Campobello, South Carolina, the number one rated semi-private golf club in South Carolina for 14 consecutive years. He was a golf professional for over 35 years. Trahan's passion for helping golfers play better and enjoy the game more resulted in the creation of several training aids and instructional videos.

In addition, Trahan shared his knowledge and philosophy through various websites.

== Author ==
Trahan was a teaching editor for Golf Magazine from 1987 to 1992 and had articles published there and in numerous national magazines. The February 1998 issue of Senior Golfer Magazine featured a six-page article outlining the results of a study based on Trahan's theory of the short, 3/4 length, limited turn backswing. The biomechanical study in which Trahan participated, and scientifically proved correct, showed that a short swing does not lose clubhead speed versus a full parallel swing. Trahan was featured in the July 1993 issue of Choice magazine, the award-winning publication of Golf-Digest Japan. Trahan wrote the feature instruction article for the February 1998 issue of Senior Golfer Magazine.

== Death ==
Trahan died after a brief illness at Massachusetts General Hospital, on June 21, 2024, at the age of 74.

== Achievements ==
=== PGA of America Apprentice Program ===
- Class A member – 1977
- PGA Master Professional – 1992

=== Awards ===
- Golf Magazine, "The Best 50 Teachers in America" – 1991
- Golf Magazine, "The 100 Best Teachers in America" – 1996
- Carolinas PGA Senior Player of the Year – 2002, 2007

=== Tournament wins ===
- 2002 Carolinas PGA (CPGA) Senior Championship
- 12 CPGA senior wins

=== Collegiate golf record ===
- Match play record (53–0–3) – 1967, 1968, 1969, 1970, 1971
