= Donal Roe MacCarthy Mór =

Donal Roe MacCarthy Mór (1239–1302) was a 13th-century noble of Ireland. He was a Prince of the Kingdom of Desmond, his father being Cormac Fionn MacCarthy, King of Desmond between 1229 and 1247.

== Marriage and issue ==
He married Margaret Fitzmaurice, the daughter of Nicholas Fitzmaurice, 3rd Baron Kerry, and Slaine O'Brien, they had issue:

- Donal Oge
- Dermod Oge, killed in 1325 at an assize court in Tralee, by his cousin, Maurice Fitzmaurice, Lord of Kerry.
- Devorgille
