= Donal O'Brien =

Donal O'Brien may refer to:

- Domnall Mór Ua Briain (died 1194), king of Munster
- Donal O'Brien (hurler) (1940–2012), Irish hurler
- Donald O'Brien (actor) (1933), French-born Irish film and television actor

== See also ==
- Domnall Ua Briain (disambiguation)
