= Donella =

Donella may refer to:

== People ==
=== Given name ===
- Donella Burridge (born 1958), Australian former synchronised swimmer
- Donella Meadows, American environmental scientist

=== Surname ===
- Chad Donella, Canadian actor

== Other uses ==
- Donella (brachiopod), a fossil genus of brachiopods in the family Pugnacidae
- Donella (plant), a genus of plants in the family Sapotaceae
