= Domhnall MacAuley =

Domhnall MacAuley MD, FRCGP, FFPHMI, FFSEM, FISM
- Born: 1957 (age 68–69)

Domhnall MacAuley (born 1957) is a former physician, a professor of primary health care and a medical journal editor. He also rowed for Northern Ireland at the 1986 Commonwealth Games.

After graduating from University College Dublin, MacAuley underwent medical training at the University of Exeter.

He obtained his MD while working as a senior research fellow at Queen's University Belfast.

He obtained a position as professor of primary health care (research) at the University of Ulster in 1997, later becoming an honorary professor.

He has been primary care editor for the British Medical Journal, and was editor of the British Journal of Sports Medicine from 1995 to 2000. He became Consultant-Associate Editor at the Canadian Medical Association Journal in 2013.
