= Don Williams (footballer, born 1939) =

Australian rules footballer

Personal information
- Full name: Don Williams
- Born: 16 August 1939
- Original team: Essex Heights
- Height: 184 cm (6 ft 0 in)
- Weight: 80 kg (176 lb)

Playing career^{1}
Years	Club	Games (Goals)
1959–60	Richmond	7 (0)
- ^{1} Playing statistics correct to the end of 1960.

Don Williams (born 16 August 1939) is a former Australian rules footballer who played with Richmond in the Victorian Football League (VFL).
