= Don Wilson (Australian footballer) =

Australian rules footballer, born 1914

Personal information
- Full name: Donald Angus Wilson
- Born: 22 October 1914
- Died: 6 December 2015; Victoria
- Original team: Spotswood
- Height: 178 cm (5 ft 10 in)
- Weight: 73 kg (161 lb)

Playing career^{1}
Years	Club	Games (Goals)
1937–39	Footscray	7 (0)
- ^{1} Playing statistics correct to the end of 1939.

Donald Angus Wilson (22 October 1914 – 6 December 2015) is a former Australian rules footballer who played with Footscray in the Victorian Football League (VFL).
