= Donald Gordon (cricketer) =

English cricketer

Personal information
- Full name: Donald Ashley Gordon
- Born: 3 October 1990 (age 36); Isle of Wight, England
- Height: 6 ft 7 in (2.01 m)
- Batting: Right-handed
- Bowling: Right-arm fast-medium

Domestic team information
- Years: Team
- 2011–present: Oxford MCCU

Career statistics
Competition	First-class
Matches	3
Runs scored	1
Batting average	1.00
100s/50s	–/–
Top score	1*
Balls bowled	337
Wickets	5
Bowling average	49.40
5 wickets in innings	–
10 wickets in match	–
Best bowling	2/27
Catches/stumpings	2/–
- Source: Cricinfo, 4 October 2011

Donald Ashley Gordon (born 3 October 1990) is an English cricketer. Gordon is a right-handed batsman who bowls right-arm fast-medium. He was born on the Isle of Wight and educated at Ryde School.

While studying for his degree in mathematics at Keble College, Oxford, Gordon made his first-class debut for Oxford MCCU against Lancashire in 2011. He made two further first-class appearances for the team in that season, against Nottinghamshire and Sussex. In his matches in 2011, he took 5 wickets at an average of 49.40, with best figures of 2/27.
