= Donald C. Carlson =

American politician

Member of the South Dakota House of Representatives
- In office 1979–1984

Personal details
- Born: May 3, 1929 Bismarck, North Dakota, U.S.
- Died: February 4, 2005 (aged 75) Rapid City, South Dakota, U.S.
- Party: Republican
- Education: Augustana College

Donald C. Carlson (May 3, 1929 – February 4, 2005) was an American politician. He served as a Republican member of the South Dakota House of Representatives.

== Life and career ==
Carlson was born in Bismarck, North Dakota. He attended Augustana College and served in the United States Navy.

Carlson served in the South Dakota House of Representatives from 1979 to 1984.

Carlson died on February 4, 2005, in Rapid City, South Dakota, at the age of 75.
