= Don Wilson (pastor) =

Pastor of the Christs Church of the Valley

- Born: Donald Wilson; February 25, 1949 (age 77); Alta Vista, Kansas
- Occupations: Theologian, Pastor
- Writing career
- Subjects: Leadership, Theology
- Website: www.ccv.church

Donald Wilson (born 1949, Alta Vista, Kansas) is an American pastor who is the founder and was the senior pastor of Christ's Church of the Valley in Peoria, Arizona, one of the largest churches in the United States. On January 28, 2017, Wilson announced his retirement, effective October 29, 2017.

== Education ==
Wilson attended Manhattan Christian College, Kansas State University, and earned his Ph.D. from the California Graduate School of Theology.

== Career ==
Wilson is the founder of Christ's Church of the Valley, which has been in existence since 1982; he began services in a rented movie theatre. Since that time, Christ's Church of the Valley has held services in an elementary school, a strip mall, and a building known as ‘The Castle’. In 1996, Christ's Church of the Valley raised over $1 million in one day, purchased 50 acres (200,000 m^{2}) of land in the northwest area of Phoenix for a permanent home.

== Family and personal life ==
Wilson married Susan on August 9, 1968, and has three children. They live in Peoria, Arizona.
