= The Evil Genius =

Studio album by Mr Eazi
- Released: 27 October 2023
- Recorded: 2021–2023
- Studio: Ouidah; Cotonou; Kigali; Accra; Kokrobite; Lagos; London; Los Angeles; New York City
- Genre: Afro pop
- Length: 41:09
- Label: emPawa Africa
- Producer: Knucks; Mr Eazi; Timmy; KDream; E Kelly; Stikmatik; Yung Willis; Andre Vibez; Kel-P; KDa Great; KillBeatz; Michaël Brun; M.O.G Beatz; Phantom; AOD; Venna; Wade Oghenejabor; Nonso Amadi; Type A

Mr Eazi chronology
Something Else (2021)	The Evil Genius (2023)	Maison Rouge (2025)

Singles from The Evil Genius
- 1. "Legalize" Released: 10 June 2022; 2. "Chop Time, No Friend" Released: 18 July 2023; 3. "Advice" Released: 1 September 2023; 4. "Fefe Ne Fefe" Released: 10 October 2023; 5. "Exit" Released: 23 October 2023

The Evil Genius is the debut studio album by Nigerian singer and songwriter Mr Eazi. It was released on 27 October 2023 by emPawa Africa. The album features guest appearances from Tekno, Joeboy, Angélique Kidjo, Efya, Whoisakin, and the Soweto Gospel Choir. Production was handled by E Kelly, M.O.G Beatz, Phantom, KillBeatz, Stikmatik, Timmy, Andre Vibez, Yung Willis, Kel-P, Type A, KDaGreat, KDream, Michaël Brun, Nonso Amadi, Knucks, AoD, Wade Oghenejabor, Venna, and Mr Eazi himself.

== Background and recording ==
Mr Eazi revealed the artwork and tracklist for the album on 23 October 2023. The album was recorded internationally, in studios across Ouidah, Cotonou, Kigali, Accra, Kokrobite, Lagos, London, Los Angeles and New York City. The recording process for The Evil Genius began on 16 February 2021 in Accra, when Kel-P invited Mr Eazi to his apartment. Mr Eazi later said he expected a casual hangout but ended up recording music after Kel-P played an instrumental repeatedly. In an interview with Afrocritik, Mr Eazi recalled, "I started singing deeply personal stuff that no one had ever heard, and Kel-P said, 'Let’s record,' and we did." The session produced the track "Exit" and marked the starting point for the project.

== Singles ==
The lead single for The Evil Genius, "Legalize", was released on 10 June 2022, and was produced by Michaël Brun, E Kelly, and Nonso Amadi. The music video for "Legalize" was released the same day and was shot by Federico Mazzarisi in Venice and released the same day, with a cameo appearance from the Nigerian actress Temi Otedola. The second single "Chop Time, No Friend" was produced by Andre Vibez and KillBeatz and released on 18 July 2023. The music video for "Chop Time, No Friend" was directed by Allison Swank Owen. Mr Eazi said the meaning of the song is "like saying, 'Be in the moment. Like when you are eating, you are focusing only on your food. You are eating first. It's almost selfish in a way." The album's third single "Advice" was released on 1 September 2023 and was produced by M.O.G Beatz. The fourth single off The Evil Genius, Fefe Ne Fefe, was released on 10 October 2023 and was produced by Kel-P. The fifth and last single "Exit" features the Soweto Gospel Choir and was produced by Kel-P and released on 23 October 2023. The music video was directed by Allison Swank Owen the same day.

== Critical reception ==
The Evil Genius received positive reviews from critics, mainly for its blend of highlife, afrobeats, and R&B. The album was lauded by Emmanuel Okoro of Afrocritik for offering "a raw and true expression of Mr Eazi's ingenuity and sonic brilliance." He called it "a wonderful debut effort from an artiste who has not only mastered the ropes of the music industry, but has also captured the world with his unique sound," and awarded it a rating of 7.8/10. Jon Dolan of Rolling Stone wrote that The Evil Genius presented Mr Eazi as "both a curator and an ambassador" through an album with a "Pan-African scope" and "grand ambition," concluding that it balanced "personal pride, local struggle, and global ambitions" in "one man’s vision." Pulse Nigeria's Adeayo Adebiyi described The Evil Genius as an album where Mr Eazi "maintains a mid-tempo approach" while exploring familiar sonic territories, but the album "fails to reach a high point" and feels "sonically repetitive". Despite its coherence, Adebiyi suggested that since "his success in business and his unique approach to music have earned Mr. Eazi the right to call himself a genius..., it's time for him to tap into that genius and evolve his sound to offer something refreshing," giving the album a rating of 6.9 out of 10.

== Track listing ==
The Evil Genius track listing
No.	Title	Writer(s)	Producer(s)	Length
1.	"Olúwa Jọ̀"	Oluwatosin Ajibade; Emmanuel Nwosu; Ifeoma Edith Ajibade; Bansi Sohodeb; Samuel Adetiloye	E Kelly; Stikmatik; Timmy; Mr Eazi	1:18
2.	"Advice"	Ajibade; John Dosunmu-Mensah	M.O.G Beatz	2:45
3.	"Òròkórò" (featuring Angélique Kidjo)	Ajibade; Angélique Kidjo; Joshua Nkansah; Oluwaseun Hassan	Kel-P	3:09
4.	"Chop Time, No Friend"	Ajibade; Joseph Addison; Alexander Uwaifo	KillBeatz; Andre Vibez	2:48
5.	"Notorious"	Ajibade; Alastair O'Donnell	Kel-P; AoD; KDaGreat	2:28
6.	"Panadol"	Ajibade; Kelenna Agada; Nkansah	Type A	2:29
7.	"Jamboree" (featuring Tekno)	Ajibade; Tobechukwu Okoh; Daniel Williams	Yung Willis	2:31
8.	"Good Lovin'" (featuring Efya)	Ajibade; Agada	Type A	2:49
9.	"Lack Of Communication"	Ajibade; Agada; Nkansah; Hassan; Udoma Amba	Kel-P; Mr Eazi	2:17
10.	"Fefe Ne Fefe"	Ajibade; Nkansah; Amba	Kel-P	2:26
11.	"Legalize"	Ajibade; Nwosu; Chinonso Amadi; Michaël Brun	Michaël Brun; E Kelly; Nonso Amadi	2:26
12.	"Show Dem" (featuring Whoisakin)	Ajibade; Akinola Akin; Ayobami Olaleye	Phantom	2:33
13.	"We Dey"	Ajibade; Wade Oghenejabor; Malik Venner; Akin; Nwosu; Abdulmalik Bawa; Ashley Nwachukwu; O'Donnell	Knucks; AoD; E Kelly; Wade Oghenejabor; Venna	2:39
14.	"Zuzulakate" (featuring Joeboy)	Ajibade; Joseph Akinfenwa-Donus; Nkansah; Favour Brown; Agada	Type A; E Kelly	2:49
15.	"Mandela"	Ajibade; King-David Adeboye; Damilola Aminu	KDream	2:40
16.	"Exit" (featuring Soweto Gospel Choir)	Ajibade; Nkansah	Kel-P	2:56
Total length:				41:09

== Personnel ==
- Oluwatosin "Mr Eazi" Ajibade – vocals, writer, producer
- Joseph "Joeboy" Akinfenwa-Donus – vocals, writer
- Angélique Kidjo – vocals, writer
- Akinola "Whoisakin" Akin – vocals, writer
- Jane "Efya" Awindor – vocals
- Augustine "Tekno" Kelechi – vocals
- Soweto Gospel Choir – vocals
- Yash "Stikmatik" Sohodeb – producer, writer
- Emmanuel "E Kelly" Nwosu – producer, writer, mixing engineer, mastering engineer
- Udoma "Kel-P" Amba – producer, writer, recording engineer
- Alexander "Andre Vibez" Uwaifo – producer, writer
- John "M.O.G. Beatz" Dosunmu-Mensah – producer, writer
- Kelenna "Type A" Agada – producer, writer
- Joseph "KillBeatz" Addison – producer, writer
- Daniel "Yung Willis" Williams – producer, writer
- Alastair "AoD" O'Donnell – producer, writer
- Chinonso "Nonso" Amadi – producer, writer
- Michaël Brun – producer, writer
- Ayobami "Phantom" Olaleye – producer, writer
- Wade "Wademix" Oghenejabor – producer, writer
- Malik "Venna" Venner – producer, writer
- Samuel "Timmy" Adetiloye – producer, writer
- Ashley "Knucks" Nwachukwu – producer, writer
- Kevin "KDaGreat" Midonzi – producer
- Mark "Exit" Goodchild – mixing engineer
- Demetrius "DbMixing" Bell – mixing engineer
- Alex Robinson – mixing engineer
- Ronald "GuiltyBeatz" Banful – mixing engineer
- Michael "Synx" Nwachukwu – mixing engineer, mastering engineer
- Joshua "Moszi" Nkansah – guitar, writer
- Tobechukwu "Peruzzi" Okoh – writer
- Oluwaseun "Nakamura" Hassan – writer
- Abdulmalik Bawa – writer
- Ifeoma Edith Ajibade – writer
- Allison Swank Owen – video director

== Release history ==
Release history and formats for The Evil Genius
Region	Date	Format	Label
Various	27 October 2023	Streaming; Digital download	emPawa Africa
