= Claude-Alix Bertrand =

Haitian-American Diplomat

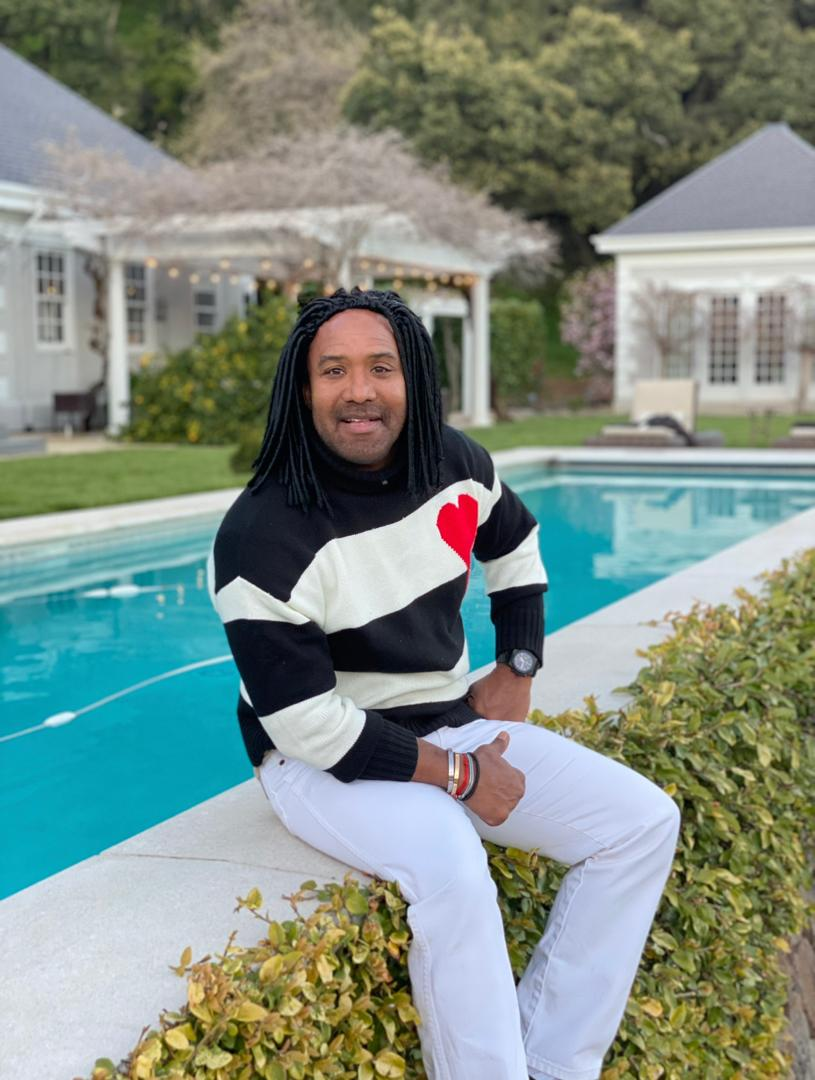
- Bertrand in 2025

Ambassador UNESCO Haiti
- In role 2014–present
- President: Michel Martelly

Personal details
- Born: 21 November 1975 (age 50) Port‑au‑Prince, Haiti
- Parent(s): Yves-Alix Bertrand, Jessie Coles
- Education: University of California Berkeley

Claude-Alix Bertrand (born November 19, 1975) is a Haitian-American diplomat, athlete, spokesperson, entrepreneur, and captain of Haiti Polo Team. He is Ambassador UNESCO for Haiti, a Global Ambassador of the Special Olympics, a Word & Action Ambassador and a Goodwill ambassador for Haiti.

== Early life and education ==
Claude-Alix Bertrand was born in Port-au-Prince, Haiti. At age seven, he started riding horses and began playing polo in Barbados, later becoming a professional polo player in 2003.

Claude-Alix Bertrand in the wedding party of President Jean-Claude Duvalier in 1980

In 1980, when the President of Haiti Jean-Claude Duvalier married Michèle Bennett, the young Bertrand was in the wedding party.

Bertrand received a bachelor’s degree in architecture from the University of California, followed by a master’s degree in interior architecture from the Ecole nationale supérieure-des-beaux-Arts in Paris.

== Justice for sexual abuse of minors ==
In January 2022, Bertrand accused Evans Lescouflair, the former minister of youth and sport in Haiti, of sexually abusing, and repeatedly raping him when he was 11 years old and a student at Institution St-Louis de Gonzague, where Lescouflair was a physical education teacher and soccer organizer.

As a result of the abuse and assault, he experienced severe depression as a child, but did not report the abuse. Then his family moved to the United States, where he started receiving psychological treatment.

In 2022, his case against Lescouflair garnered international interest and as a result, he was named an ambassador for Word & Action. Investigator Roman Molina connected Evans Lescouflair to Yves Jean-Bart who was already banned for life at FIFA over a sexual abuse scandal of his own. An arrest warrant was issued in Haiti for Lescouflair and a court date was set, but Lescouflair absconded and fled the country. Interpol picked him up in the Panama City airport, attempting to board a flight to Brazil. He was extradited to Santo Domingo, then to Haiti, where he was imprisoned in the Penitencier National in Port-au-Prince.

In April 2025, the transitional government in Haiti voted to create an ad hoc Presidential Commission called the Commission Against Non-Accidental Violence in Sports, in response to public outcry and private lobbying at all administrative levels of the government. The commission's announcement was signed by transitional president Fritz Jean, the prime minister Alix Didier Fils-Aimé, and the following ministers: Paul Antoine Bien-Aimé, Patrick Pelissier, Jean-Victor Harvel Jean-Baptiste, J.E. Kathia Verdier, Alfred Fils Metellus, Marie D.A. Ketleen Florestal, Vernet Joseph, Raphael Hosty, James Monazard, John Henrick Dessources, Moises Jean Pierre Fils, Augustin Antoine, Patrick Delatour, Georges Wilbert Franck, Bertrand Sinal, Pedrica Saint Jean, Nicola Lynn Sarah Devalis Octavius and Jean Michel Moises; and then printed in the May 5, 2025 issue of Le Moniteur.

== Professional life ==
In 1992, Bertrand opened Standing Room Only, a chain of restaurants and catering services in San Francisco. He also opened a wine bar the same year.

In 2003, he founded Atelier Bertrand Interiors, an interior architecture company where he served as a chief architect. In the same year, his interior architectural designs were featured in SF Magazine.

Bertrand joined the United States Polo Association as a professional polo player in 2003. Then in January 2013, he became the captain of the Haiti Polo Team. In 2014, he led the team in winning its first trophy at the Audi Sportscar Experience International Polo Tournament, San Francisco. The team won by defeating the U.S. team with a score of 6 to 2. In the same year, Sidelines Magazine named Bertrand Hot Horseman of the Year. He played polo in Australia in 2018, leading Haiti Polo Team to a runner-up title in the World Series of Polo.

In addition, he is also the president of La Federation Haïtienne de Polo and the publisher of Polo Lifestyles magazine, a luxury publication that is distributed globally each month to more than 2 million readers.

== Diplomatic appointment and duties ==
In September 2014, he was nominated as Goodwill Ambassador for Haiti by Haiti’s president, Michel Martelly, at an official ceremony at the Presidential Palace in the presence of Haiti's Prime Minister Laurent Lamothe, Minister of Tourism and Creative Industries Stéphanie Villedrouin and Minister of Sport and Youth Himmler Rebu. In addition, he was appointed Ambassador UNESCO for Haiti, and as Special Olympics Global Ambassador by the Comité National Special Olympics d’Haiti in 2019.

As Ambassador UNESCO, Bertrand promotes the educational, cultural, artistic and historic preservation of Haiti through diplomatic channels, events, fundraising and interviews. In 2014, he attended the Miss Haiti competition in Port-au-Prince with Stephanie Villedrouin and launched a polo resort project in the Côtes-de-Fer region of Haiti. The plans include an international airport, 8,000-acre multi-hotel resort area, restaurants, training centers and terrains for polo, soccer, golf, Formula One and tennis. An international seaport is also included in the plans.

In September 2021, in response to the crisis of Haitian immigrants at the Mexico-Texas border, Bertrand spoke to KQED-FM's Alexis Madrigal on the morning show, Forum, advocating for justice and compassion at the border and answered questions from call-in listeners.
