= Legalize (song) =

- Painting by Patricorel

Single by Mr Eazi

from the album The Evil Genius
- Released: 10 June 2022
- Genre: Banku music; Afropop
- Length: 2:26
- Label: emPawa Africa
- Songwriter: Oluwatosin Ajibade
- Producers: Mr Eazi (exec.); E-Kelly; Michael Brun; Nonso Amadi

Mr Eazi singles chronology
"I Wanna Run Away" (2021)	"Legalize" (2022)

Music video
- "Legalize" on YouTube

"Legalize" is a song by Nigerian singer Mr Eazi, released on 10 June 2022, through emPawa Africa. "Legalize" was written by Mr Eazi and produced by emPawa head of music, and record producer E-Kelly, Michael Brun, and Nonso Amadi. The music video, was shot by Federico Mazzarisi in Venice and released the same day, with a cameo appearance from the Nigerian actress Temi Otedola.

== Background ==
On 10 April, Temi Otedola got engaged to Mr Eazi. In a press release, he said “I started the song in Michael Brun’s house on some edibles, freestyling, and later went to London and listened to what I’d recorded, and realized what the song was about. I’ve been thinking of asking Temi to marry me for a long time, so I guess it was in my subconscious” During the press, he said: “It’s more like this song is for me, after arranging to shoot the song video in Venice and purchasing an engagement ring, I felt the set would be the ideal location to propose.” and added, “No one on set knew what was going to happen.”

=== Documentary ===
I started to see the similarities between the music space and the art space in terms of the business model my company emPawa does … [which] finds artists, musicians and works with them, nurtures them and their careers, and gives them the opportunities to break into the world

- Eazi told ARTnews

Behind-the-scenes photos were released through BellaNaija on 8 June 2022. The cover image, is an artwork painted by the Beninese artist Patricorel, which also features in "Legalize: The Art Experience" a short film, starring Mr Eazi, Patricorel, Liya, Joey Akan, Wadude, Rukky Ojukoko, Tochi Louis, Minz, Zuwa, and Fidel. The documentary was produced by A Family Picture in Cotonou and released on 9 June.

== Commercial performance ==
On 19 June 2022, "Legalize" debuted at number 13 on the UK Official Afrobeats Single Top 20 Chart. On 20 June 2022, "Legalize" debuted at number 31, on Nigeria TurnTable Top 50 chart. On 22 June 2022, "Legalize" debuted on at number 30 on TurnTable Top 50 Airplay, and number 38 on TurnTable Top 50 Streaming Songs.

== Music video ==
On 10 June 2022, Mr Eazi released the music video for "Legalize", through emPawa Africa. The visual features a cameo appearance from his finance Temi Otedola. The visual was directed by Federico Mazzarisi in Venice.

== Personnel ==
- Oluwatosin Ajibade - Primary artist, writer, executive producer
- Production
  - E-Kelly - Co-producer, co-executive producer
  - Michael Brun - Co-producer
  - Nonso Amadi - Co-producer
- Temi Otedola - Cameo appearance

=== Documentary cast ===
- Patricorel
- Liya
- Joey Akan
- Wadude
- Rukky Ojukoko
- Tochi Louis
- Minz
- Zuwa
- Fidela

== Charts ==
=== Weekly charts ===
Chart performance for "Legalize"
Chart (2022)	Peak position
Nigeria (TurnTable Top 50)	31
Nigeria Top 50 Streaming Songs (TurnTable)	38
Nigeria Top 50 Airplay (TurnTable)	30
UK Afrobeats (OCC)	13

== Release history ==
Release history for "Legalize"
Region	Date	Format	Label	Ref.
Various	10 June 2022	Digital download; streaming	emPawa Africa	
