= Dennis White =

Dennis White may refer to:

- Sir Dennis White (colonial administrator) (1910–1983), British high commissioner for Brunei
- Dennis White (footballer) (1948–2019), English footballer
- Dennis White (police commissioner), American police officer, commissioner of the Boston Police Department
- Dennis L. A. White, American stage and screen actor
- Denny White, American politician in Ohio

== See also ==
- Static Revenger, American record producer and songwriter also known as Dennis White and Latroit
