= J. Perry =

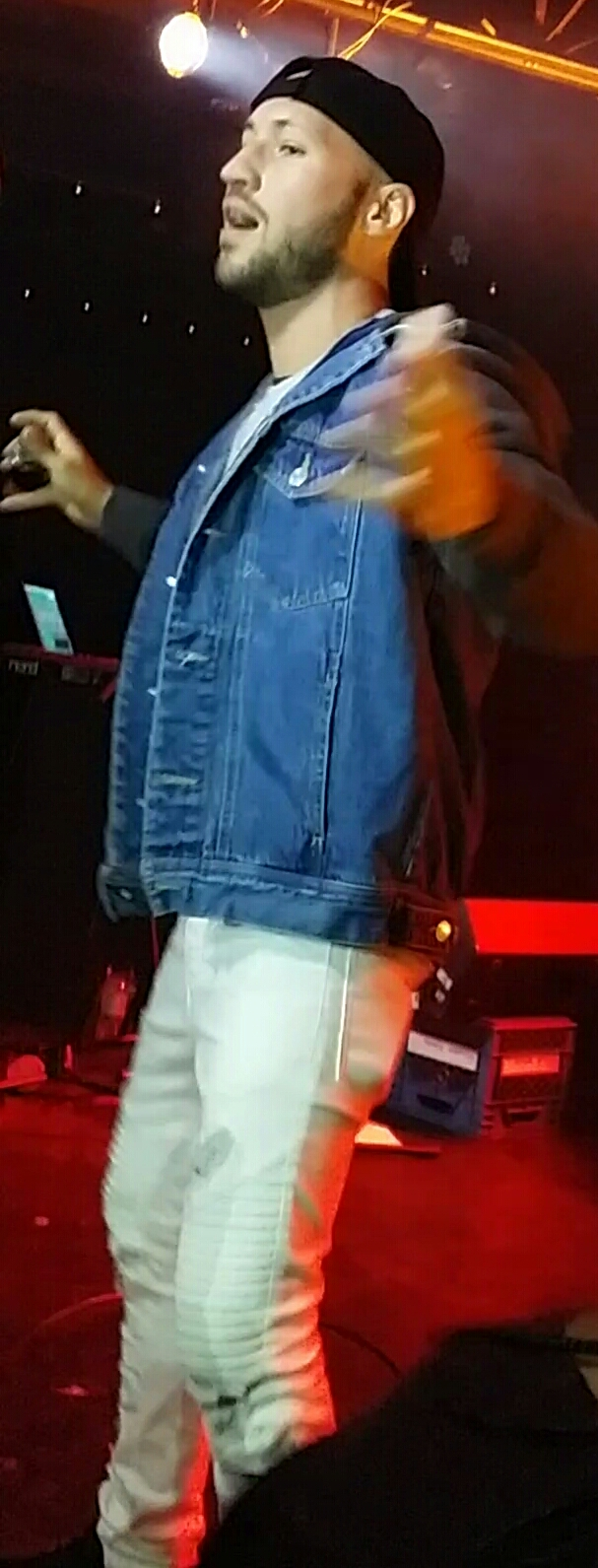
- Jonathan Perry

Background information
- Born: Jonathan Perry; June 4, 1988 (age 38); Port-au-Prince, Haiti
- Genres: Dancehall, zumba, house, compas
- Occupations: Singer–songwriter, composer
- Instruments: Vocals, piano
- Years active: 2009-present
- Label: Baoli Records
- Website: officialjperry.com

Jonathan Perry (born June 4, 1988) better known by his stage name J. Perry, is a Haitian singer, songwriter, and composer. On 18 February 2012, President of Haiti Michel Martelly, alongside the Minister of Tourism, Stéphanie Villedrouin & the Haitian Carnival Committee gave Perry a Gold Disk Plaque for his song Dekole (Haitian Creole to mean, "take off") which inspired the theme of the 2012 Carnival.

== Early life ==
J. Perry grew up in Port-au-Prince, Haiti. He started to play music when he was six years old. Before he had learned musical notes, Perry would already have played back the songs of which he heard. His mother, quickly put him in piano lessons that he would take after school to further his musical talents. He had the opportunity to play in several concerts, recitals, contests, a Dominican orchestra at the age of eleven, and continued to play classical music until thirteen.

== Music career ==
In June 2009, Perry decided to focus on completing his debut album. While working with the CEO and owner, Carl Fred Behrmann of Baoli Records, Perry has been songwriting and producing for many different artists in Haiti. Baoli Records have been pushing Perry in his own music career.

After releasing his first single, “Starin at your body”, J.Perry and Baoli Records became in contact with the multi-hit producer Power Surge of XO Management, to produce the debut album with them. This producing company is known for songs such as “Look What I Did” of Interscope Records, Mosley Music Group (Timbaland) & Konvict Music’s (Akon & T-Pain) artist Billy Blue featuring Brisco of Cash Money Records (Lil Wayne) & Trick Daddy of Poe Boy Music Group (Rick Ross) for DJ Khaled’s album “Live from the 305”, and also “Do it” from Jamaican artist, Shifta, featuring chart topping superstar Flo Rida. “Starin at your Body” was remixed with a hit artist “Black Dada” (known for his hit song I’m a Zoe).

“One life to live”, Perry's debut album was released in Haiti in November 2011 distributed online through iTunes, Rhapsody and others. His first song on the album Dekole” took Haiti by storm. It was aired a total of 765 times in one week on local Haitian radio stations, with a never seen before airplay. The song was awarded hit song of the year and was chosen as the 2012 "theme song" for the Haitian Carnival. The 2012 Haitian national Carnival is named “Ayiti ap Dekole”, inspired by this song. The song even hit Brazilian airwaves via Claudia Leitte, one of the most popular Axé singers in Brazil in which a remix was made with her featuring Perry.

== Life story ==
J. Perry has had "Dekole" as a featured track on the Zumba® MegaMix 33 album, and "Bouje" (Haitian Creole: move) on the Zumba® Incredible Results infomercial. By being included in the MegaMix, Miami star Pitbull has launched him into Pepsi commercials.

== World Cup 2014 ==
ESPN had picked the Brazilian interpretation of "Dekole" by Claudia Leitte & J. Perry for their 2014 World Cup Broadcasts.

== Discography ==
- One Life To Live (2011)
- Kiyès Ou Ye (2017)

== Singles ==
- Starin At Your Body -2011
- Dekole ft. Izolan & Shabba -2011
- Holding On -2011
- Yeux Dans Les Yeux ft. Niskkaa -2011
- Plane -2012
- Enjoy -2012
- Let It Be -2012 (Prod. by Michael Brun)
- Bouje -2013
- Prezidan -2013
- Konsey ' -2015
