= Lagos to London =

2018 mixtape by Mr Eazi

Life Is Eazi, Vol. 2 - Lagos to London

Mixtape by Mr Eazi
- Released: 9 November 2018
- Recorded: 2017–2018
- Genre: Afro pop
- Length: 49:00
- Label: Banku Music; Universal Music Africa
- Producer: Juls; KillBeatz; Soji; E-Kelly; Da Beatfreakz; AoD; GuiltyBeatz; The Cavemen; Moelogo; Picard Brothers; Simba Tagz; Fred Again; Jay Weathers; Mr Eazi; Pheelz; Jae5; Speroach Beatz; Chopstix; Sarz

Mr Eazi chronology
Life Is Eazi, Vol. 1 – Accra to Lagos (2017)	Life Is Eazi, Vol. 2 - Lagos to London (2018)	One Day You Will Understand (2020)

Singles from Life Is Eazi, Vol. 2 – Lagos to London
- 1. "Pour Me Water" Released: 17 November 2017; 2. "London Town" Released: 23 May 2018; 3. "Property" Released: 27 July 2018; 4. "Keys to the City (Ogede)" Released: 5 October 2018

Life Is Eazi, Vol. 2 – Lagos to London, also shortened to Lagos to London, is the third mixtape by Nigerian singer and songwriter Mr Eazi, and the follow-up to his previous mixtape, Life Is Eazi, Vol. 1 – Accra to Lagos. It was released on 9 November 2018 by Banku Music and Universal Music Africa, and features artists Burna Boy, Simi, 2Baba, Diplo, Maleek Berry, Giggs, King Promise, Chronixx, Lotto Boyzz, Sneakbo, Mo-T, Lady Donli and actor and comedian Broda Shaggi. Notable producers who Mr Eazi worked with include Sarz, Simba Tagz, Da Beatfreakz, Speroach Beatz, Pheelz, Jae5, E-Kelly, Juls, Jay Weathers, GuiltyBeatz, Soji, KillBeatz, Chopstix, Moelogo, The Cavemen., Fred Again, AoD, and the Picard Brothers. The mixtape housed the singles "Pour Me Water", "London Town", "Overload", and "Keys to the City (Ogede)".

== Background ==
On 11 October 2018, an early track list of the mixtape was released, and was revealed to feature artists such as Diplo and Distruction Boyz. The mixtape was also teased to be split into two sections, "Lagos" and "London", however, that wasn't the case.

In an interview with OkayAfrica, Mr Eazi revealed that his favorite song off Lagos to London was "Chicken Curry".

== Singles ==
The lead single "Pour Me Water" was released on 17 November 2017. The song was produced and co-written by E-Kelly. The music video for "Pour Me Water" was directed by Teekay and released on 16 December 2017. The mixtape's second single "London Town" features British rapper Giggs and was produced by Da Beatfreakz and co-produced by Chopstix and Moelogo. The music video for "London Town" was shot and directed in London by Meji Alabi. The third single off the mixtape, "Property" features Mo-T of Mi Casa. It was released on 27 July 2018, and was produced by Fred Again. The music video was directed by Meji Alabi. The fourth single, "Keys to the City (Ogede)" was released on 5 October 2018 and produced by Simba Tagz, Sarz, and GuiltyBeatz. The music video was released the same day and directed by Alabi.

== Critical reception ==
The mixtape received generally positive reviews from music critics. Oris Aigbokhaevbolo of Music in Africa praised Mr Eazi's versatility in Lagos to London, stating that "you might think of most Mr Eazi's good songs as inspired by Ghana; but his commercial instincts are entirely Nigerian." While the mixtape mirrors the structure of Accra to Lagos, he found the Lagos section is weaker compared to the London one. Aigbokhaevbolo acknowledged Mr Eazi's success in blending Ghanaian, Nigerian, and London influences, making him a unique and commercially savvy artist.

Dennis Peter of Nigerian Entertainment Today said Lagos to London showed Mr Eazi’s rise to international fame, capturing his energy and growth, noting it "captures that energy, while also slyly but deliberately illumining his trajectory so far." He concluded the album’s style and sequencing made it "beyond" just a collection of songs.

Debola Abimbolu of The Native said the mixtape showed Mr Eazi blending African and UK influences while identifying his global growth, noting it "welcomes listeners to experience Africa through the music many Africans grew up listening to." He concluded that the album's vibrant tracks and collaborations "cover the trail of Afropop from its origin in Nigeria, to its present influence on music in the UK."

== Track listing ==
Life Is Eazi, Vol. 2 – Lagos to London track listing
No.	Title	Writer(s)	Producer(s)	Length
1.	"Lagos Gyration (Intro)" (featuring Lady Donli)	Oluwatosin Ajibade; Zainab Donli; Tomi Thomas; Benjamin James; Kingsley Okorie	The Cavemen	0:47
2.	"Surrender" (featuring Simi)	Ajibade; Simisola Ogunleye; Phillip Moses; Julian Nicco-Annan; Alastair O'Donnell	Pheelz; Juls	2:42
3.	"Dabebi" (featuring Maleek Berry and King Promise)	Ajibade; Maleek Shoyebi; Gregory Newman	KillBeatz; GuiltyBeatz; Soji	2:58
4.	"Suffer Head" (featuring 2Baba)	Ajibade; Innocent Idibia; Sister Nancy; Obi Prosper; Ronald Banful	Speroach Beatz; GuiltyBeatz	3:19
5.	"Property" (featuring Mo-T)	Ajibade; Moshe Kgasoane; Emmanuel Nwosu; Frederick Gibson	Fred Again; Mr Eazi	2:25
6.	"Pour Me Water"	Ajibade; Nwosu	E-Kelly	2:48
7.	"Keys to the City (Ogede)"	Ajibade; Simbarashe Tagwireyi; Osabuohien Osaretin; Banful	Mr Eazi; Sarz; Simba Tagz; GuiltyBeatz	2:48
8.	"Open & Close" (featuring Diplo)	Ajibade; Thomas Pentz; Clement Picard; Maxime Picard	Picard Brothers	2:44
9.	"In Molue to London" (skit; featuring Broda Shaggi)	Ajibade; Samuel Perry	GuiltyBeatz	0:38
10.	"Miss You Bad" (featuring Burna Boy)	Ajibade; Damini Ogulu; O'Donnell; Jay Weathers	Alastair O'Donnell; Jay Weathers	2:56
11.	"Attention" (featuring Lotto Boyzz)	Ajibade; Lucas-Luke Henry; Ash-Irmhan Kirnon; Banful	GuiltyBeatz	2:26
12.	"Yard & Chill"	Ajibade; Jonathan Awote-Mensah; Gibson	Jae5; Fred Again	2:21
13.	"She Loves Me" (featuring Chronixx)	Ajibade; Jamar McNaughton; Gibson	Fred Again	2:31
14.	"Chicken Curry" (featuring Sneakbo)	Ajibade; Agassi Odusina; Ian Greenidge; Banful	GuiltyBeatz	3:00
15.	"London Town" (featuring Giggs)	Ajibade; Nathaniel Thompson; Animashaun; Donli; Shakka Phillip; Obi Ebele; Malcolm Olagundoye; Uche Ebele; O'Donnell	Chopstix; Moelogo; Da Beatfreakz	3:20
Total length:				49:00

== Personnel ==
- Oluwatosin "Mr Eazi" Ajibade – vocals, writer, producer
- Okunola "Maleek Berry" Shoyebi – vocals, writer, producer
- Zainab "Lady" Donli – vocals, writer, producer
- Damini "Burna Boy" Ogulu – vocals, writer
- Innocent "2Baba" Idibia – vocals, writer
- Simisola "Simi" Ogunleye – vocals, writer
- Nathaniel "Giggs" Thompson – vocals, writer
- Gregory "King Promise" Newman – vocals, writer
- Ash Kirnon and Lucas Henry – vocals, writer
- Jamar "Chronixx" McNaughton – vocals, writer
- Agassi "Sneakbo" Odusina – vocals, writer
- Sister Nancy – vocals, writer
- Samuel "Broda Shaggi" Perry – skit, writer
- Obi and Uche "Da Beatfreakz" Ebele – producers, writers
- Clement and Maxime "Picard Brothers" Picard – producers, writers
- Benjamin and Kingsley "The Cavemen" Okorie – producers, writer
- Emmanuel "E-Kelly" Nwosu – producer, writer
- Ronald "GuiltyBeatz" Banful – producer, writer
- Phillip "Pheelz" Moses – producer, writer
- Osabuohien "Sarz" Osaretin – producer, writer
- Joseph "KillBeatz" Addison – producer, writer
- Frederick "Fred Again" Gibson – producer, writer
- Julian Nicco-Annan – producer, writer
- Olasoji "Soji" Sonowo – producer, writer
- Alastair "AoD" O'Donnell – producer, writer
- Simbarashe "Simba Tagz" Tagwireyi – producer, writer
- Jay Weathers – producer, writer
- Jonathan "Jae5" Awote-Mensah – producer, writer
- Mohammed "Moelogo" Animashaun – producer, writer
- Obi "Speroach Beatz" Prosper – producer, writer
- Malcolm "Chopstix" Olagundoye – producer, writer
- Shakka Phillip – writer
- Ian Greenidge – writer
- Thomas Pentz – writer
- Tomi Thomas – writer
- Moshe "Mo-T" Kgasoane – trumpet
