= Evans Lescouflair =

Haitian politician

Evans Lescouflair is a Haitian politician. He formerly served as Minister of Youth, Sports and Civic Action and as leader of the Cooperative Action to Build Haiti political party.

He has faced several allegations of having committed sexual assault. In 2015, Himmler Rebu, who was then serving as Haitian Minister of Sports, accused Lescouflair of having abused youth sports players.

In March 2022, additional allegations of sexual abuse surfaced against him, including from youth former members of the Club Sportif Saint-Louis and from Claude-Alix Bertrand, the Haitian ambassador to UNESCO. He fled to Central America, and on July 2, 2022, he was arrested in Panama. He was repatriated to Haiti via Santo Domingo, and imprisoned in the Penitencier National in Port-au-Prince.

== See also ==
- UN child sexual abuse scandal in Haiti
