= Alix Balmir =

Haitian diplomat

Alix Balmir is a Haitian diplomat. He has been ambassador to Venezuela and to Colombia, and is currently ambassador to Panama. His youngest daughter, Stéphanie Balmir Villedrouin, was a minister within President Michel Martelly’s cabinet.
