= DJ Tarico =

Mozambican DJ and record producer

- Born: Tárico Caifaz Samuel Simbine; Maputo, Mozambique
- Genres: Amapiano
- Occupations: Disc jockey, Sound Engineer, Record producer
- Years active: 2014–present
- Label: Geobek Records
- Member of: Yaba Buluku Boyz

Tárico Caifaz Samuel Simbine known professionally as DJ Tarico, is a Mozambican DJ, sound engineer and record producer from Maputo signed to Geobek Records. The main man of the Yaba Buluku Boyz, Tarico is noted for his production credits and his 2021 self produced single "Yaba Buluku" off his sophomore studio album Moz Piano Vol. 2 which became an instant hit in several countries and helped in popularizing Amapiano, described by Billboard as a hit for all season.

Tarico began disc jockeying in 2014 and began to gain recognition as a record producer in 2016. In 2021, he received 5 nominations at the 2021 AFRIMA awards and 2 nominations at the 2021 AFRIMMA (USA) awards and is a recipient of Best Collaboration award at the 2021 ASEA awards. In addition to his awards nominations, he received 2 nominations each, at AFRIMA and The Headies awards of 2022 and was nominated for Best African DJ of the Year at the 2023 Soundcity MVP awards.

Tarico has produced several hit singles for a variety of eminent artists across different music genres including hip hop, afrobeats, bongo flava, and amapiano and has worked with Makhadzi, Harmonize, Jux, Joey B, Mr Eazi, Crayon, Falz, Moonchild Sanelly, DJ Neptune, Medikal, Shatta Wale, Ami Faku, Jah Pryzah, Iyanya and Burna Boy. On 5 November 2022 Tarico hosted This Is Africa on BBC World Service in the UK.

== Early life ==
Tarico was born in the capital and chief port of Mozambique, Maputo. At the age of 14, he was taught how to DJ by his Neighbor, the same age he strengthened his love for music while in secondary school where he joined an all boys group Afro Madjaha. At that time, they would go to Reginald Studios where he was taught how to produce, write and make music. After 2 years, one of the members of the group died, the group was discontinued and Tarico had to embark on his own to pursue his career.

== Production discography ==
Credits adapted from Spotify
Artist	Title	Reference
Mr Eazi ft Joey B and DJ Tarico	“Patek”	
Harmonize	“Single Again”	
Crayon ft Yaba Buluku Boyz	“The One (Chop Life)”	
Mr. Bow ft Harmonize	“Fire”	
Jux ft DJ Tarico and G Nako	“Shugga Daddy”	
ChopLife SoundSystem ft Mr Eazi, DJ Neptune, Minz, Medikal and Shatta Wale	“See Something “	
DJ Tarico ft Yuri da Cunha	“Abre O Cannal”	
Yaba Buluku Boyz ft DJ Tarico and Jah Pryzah	“Wa Kula (Zacaria)”	
Yaba Buluku Boyz ft Falz	“Madam De Madam”	
ChopLife SoundSystem ft Mr Eazi	“Werser”	
Makhadzi ft Yaba Buluku Boyz	“Swilo Swamina”	
Bander ft DJ Tarico, DJ SupaMan and Amira	“Mazazas”	
Dehermes, lan Blanco, MR. KUKA	“Puxa Mazambana”	
ChopLife SoundSystem ft Mr Eazi and Ami Faku	“Wena”	
DJ Tarico ft Mano Tsotsi	“Bodene”	
Iyanya ft DJ Tarico, Nelson Tivane and Preck	“No Where”	
Mr Eazi ft Falz, Major League DJz, DJ Tarico and Joey B	“Patek (Remix)”	
TOME ft Yaba Buluku Boyz	“Hold You”	
ChopLife SoundSystem ft Mr Eazi, 2woshort and Stompiiey	“Big Boy”	
ChopLife SoundSystem ft Mr Eazi and Nkosazana Daughter	“Die For You”	
ChopLife SoundSystem ft Mr Eazi and Aymos	“Ziwa La”	
ChopLife SoundSystem ft Mr Eazi and Nkosazana Daughter	“Indaba”	
ChopLife SoundSystem ft Mr Eazi	“Tear Chain”	
ChopLife SoundSystem ft Mr Eazi, Moonchild Sanelly and Linda Kim	“Oh Yes”	
Yaba Buluku Boyz ft Harmonize	"Lala"	

== Discography ==
=== Albums ===
- Moz Piano (2020)
- Moz Piano (2020)

Extended plays

- Urban Kings (2017)
- Kizoraxxa Land (2018)
- Urban Kings, Vol. 2 (2019)
- Urban Killers (2020)

Adapted from Spotify
Title	Featuring	Year	Ref.
“Tarazuda”		2017	
“Marandza”		2017	
“Kizoraxxa”		2017	
“Yaba Buluku”	Nelson Tivane and Preck	2020	
“Cola Da Cunha”		2021	
“Yaba Buluku (remix)”	Burna Boy, Preck and Nelson Tivane	2021	
“Number One”	Dj Consequence	2021	
“Abre O Canal”	Yuri Da Cunha	2022	
“Patek”	Mr Eazi and Joey B	2022	
“Patek”	ChopLife SoundSystem, Mr Eazi and Joey B	2022	
“Patek - Extended”	ChopLife SoundSystem, Mr Eazi and Joey B	2022	
“Wa Kula (Zacaria)”	Yaba Buluku Boyz and Jah Pryzah	2022	
“Shugga Daddy”	Jux and G Nako	2023	
