= Yaba Buluku Boyz =

Mozambican musical group

- Origin: Maputo, Mozambique
- Genres: Amapiano, Afrobeat
- Years active: 2021-present
- Label: Geobek Records
- Members: DJ Tarico; Nelson Tivane; Preck

Yaba Buluku Boyz are African music trio composed of DJ Tarico, Nelson Tivane and Preck from Mozambique. They found International success in 2021 following the release of their debut single as a group “Yaba Buluku Remix”, described as one of the biggest collaborations in Africa at the time. They have been credited for promoting Mozambique and its culture musically.

== Background ==
The trio, Tarico, Tivane and Preck are both from Maputo, Mozambique, Tarico serves as the record producer and sound engineer of the group, Tivane is the songwriter of the group while Preck is the recording artist of the group.

The trio was discovered and formed by George Beke, and was subsequently formed in 2021 after they found International success following the release of “Yaba Buluku (Remix)” featuring Nigerian singer Burna Boy which became a face of amapiano after receiving traction on social media. The song peaked at number 1 on Viral 50 South Africa and number 5 on the Nigeria TurnTable Top Triller chart. The trio name, Yaba Buluku Boyz was derived from the song title.

In 2021, they received 5 awards nominations at the 2021 AFRIMA awards, and 2 nominations at the 2021 AFRIMMA USA awards.

== Discography ==
=== Singles ===
Year	Track	Album
2021	“Yaba Buluku” (featuring Burna Boy)	Non-album single
2021	“Tell Somebody” (featuring Effyzzie Music and Yemi Alade)	Non-album single
2021	“Waka Waka (Moza Remix)” (featuring Zoro)	Non-album single
2022	“Wa Kula” (featuring Jah Prayzah)	Non-album single
2022	“Wa Kula (Extended)”	Non-album single
2022	“Hold You” (featuring Töme)	Non-album single
2022	“Swilo Swamina” (featuring Makhadzi)	Non-album single
2023	“The One (Chop Life)” (featuring Crayon)	Non-album single
2023	“Madam De Madam” (featuring Falz)	Non-album single
2023	"Lala" (featuring Harmonize)	Non-album single
