= UN child sexual abuse scandal in Haiti =

Crime involving UN peacekeepers

The United Nations Stabilisation Mission in Haiti ("MINUSTAH") was tainted by multiple scandals involving U.N. personnel engaged in sexual exploitation or abuse of Haitians, including Haitian children. Most prominent of these was a child sexual abuse scandal involving the Sri Lankan UN peacekeepers, which emerged in 2007 following an investigation by the UN's Office of Internal Oversight Services (OIOS). At least 134 Sri Lankan soldiers serving with the UN Stabilization Mission in Haiti were accused of sexually abusing nine Haitian children from 2004 to 2007.

In 2016, the Sri Lankan government decided to make a one-time ex-gratia payment to a victim and child born as a result of sexual exploitation and abuse, which was praised by the UN. However, none of the accused were convicted of crimes by the Sri Lankan government.

== Background ==
In November 2007, 114 members of the 950 member Sri Lankan Army peacekeeping mission in Haiti were accused of sexual misconduct and abuse. 108 members of the contingent, including 3 officers, were sent back after being implicated in alleged misconduct and sexual abuse. The culture of impunity for the sexual violence against Sri Lankan Tamils during the Sri Lankan civil war contributed to the abuses.

Officials in Haiti have said that UN peacekeeping soldiers from Sri Lanka who had been accused of sex crimes in 2007 had even raped children as young as 7 years old. The UN released a report slapping the Sri Lankan contingent with accusations of building a brothel in Martissant, Port-au-Prince charging them with systematic sexual exploitation and sexual abuse of minors, prostitution and rape. "In exchange for sex, the children received small amounts of money, food, and sometimes mobile phones," reported the OIOS, the UN's investigative arm.

One girl was only 12 years old when she was first raped by Sri Lankan soldiers. One boy was raped by more than 20 soldiers in UN military trucks where he was sodomised or made to perform oral sex. Another boy was raped by over 100 soldiers, 4 per day, starting at the age of 15. Due to the prolonged contact with the Sri Lankan soldiers, the Haitian children had knowledge of various sexual expressions in Sinhala language.

== Investigations and reactions ==
After inquiry into the case the UN Office of Internal Oversight Services (OIOS) has concluded, "acts of sexual exploitation and abuse (against children) were frequent and occurred usually at night, and at virtually every location where the contingent personnel were deployed." The OIOS said charges should include statutory rape "because it involves children under 18 years of age".

UN spokeswoman Michele Montas said: "The United Nations and the Sri Lankan government deeply regret any sexual exploitation and abuse that has occurred." The Sri Lankan Officials claim that there is little tangible evidence on this case.

Noted Haitian female activist Ezhili Danto alleges:

If only a dozen UN peacekeepers were punished for sexual abuse and rape, then that means, for instance, most of the 114 Sri Lankan soldiers deported back to Sri Lanka from Haiti in 2007 for sexual abuse and rape in Haiti did not get punished.

In March 2013, a fresh batch of 400 soldiers from the Sri Lankan Army's Sinha Regiment left for Haiti as part of the UN Peacekeeping mission.

According to Sri Lanka's Permanent Ambassador to Haiti, several Sri Lankan military officers were "disciplined" for violations of military rules and some officers were "asked" to resign. Since Sri Lankan authorities judged the sexual activity in the cases to have been "consensual" and thus not criminal under Sri Lankan law, none of the accused were imprisoned.

== See also ==
- United Nations Stabilisation Mission in Haiti#Sexual abuse and exploitation of Haitians
- Sexual abuse by UN peacekeepers
- Sexual violence against Tamils in Sri Lanka
- Evans Lescouflair
