= One Day You Will Understand =

2020 EP by Mr Eazi

EP by Mr Eazi and emPawa Africa
- Released: 10 June 2020
- Genre: Afro pop; Afro&B
- Length: 10:20
- Label: emPawa Africa
- Producer: GuiltyBeatz; Blaq Jerzee; Nonso Amadi; Legendury Beatz

Mr Eazi chronology
Life Is Eazi, Vol. 2 – Lagos to London (2018)	One Day You Will Understand (2020)	Something Else (2021)

Singles from One Day You Will Understand
- 1. "I No Go Give Up On You" Released: 22 May 2020

One Day You Will Understand is the first EP by Nigerian singer Mr Eazi. Instead of being credited as a Mr Eazi release, it is credited to Mr Eazi and music company emPawa Africa. Released exclusively through emPawa Africa, the project features guest appearances from King Promise and C Natty. Production was handled by GuiltyBeatz, Blaq Jerzee, Nonso Amadi and Legendury Beatz. One Day You Will Understand serves as the follow-up to Life Is Eazi, Vol. 2 – Lagos to London (2018).

== Background ==
In an Apple Music interview, Mr Eazi said the calm surroundings of his lakeside home inspired One Day You Will Understand. He described waking up to peaceful lake views, which shaped the project's mood. He said the cover art was taken spontaneously on his iPhone while he was relaxing. He also mentioned plans to release more projects that year, mixing solo songs and collaborations with styles like Spanish and dancehall.

== Singles ==
The EP's only single "I No Go Give Up On You" was released on 22 May 2020. The song was produced by Blaq Jerzee and dropped alongside its accompanying animated visualizer.

== Critical reception ==
Pulse Nigeria's Motolani Alake praised One Day You Will Understand for its romantic themes and songwriting, likening it to "words written down and placed in a time capsule" that evoke the innocence of teenage love. He rated the EP 7.5 out of 10, calling it "an amazing experience" with "very little flaws by thought or execution." Emmanuel Esomnofu, writing for Notjustok, said that Mr Eazi "connected both endeavors—artistic and business—for his latest effort," and called the EP "a concise effort of 4 songs." He noted that it is "an appetizer—its slimness suggests there's another Mr. Eazi curated effort nearby," and concluded that listeners "should be optimistic towards future projects."

== Track listing ==
One Day You Will Understand track listing
No.	Title	Writer(s)	Producer(s)	Length
1.	"Baby I'm Jealous" (featuring King Promise)	Oluwatosin Ajibade; Gregory Newman; Ronald Banful	GuiltyBeatz	2:30
2.	"I No Go Give Up On You"	Ajibade; Okhuofu Oshoriameh; Michael Eguahon	Blaq Jerzee	2:40
3.	"Ògógóro No Sweet Pass Pami"	Ajibade; Chinonso Amadi; Emmanuel Nwosu	Nonso Amadi	2:20
4.	"Baby This Your Body Na Gòbe Fine Fine Sweet Òkpéke" (featuring C Natty)	Ajibade; Obasi Samuel	Legendury Beatz	2:49
Total length:				10:20

== Personnel ==
- Oluwatosin "Mr Eazi" Ajibade – vocals, writer
- Gregory "King Promise" Newman – vocals, writer
- Obasi "C Natty" Samuel - vocals, writer
- Chinonso "Nonso" Amadi – producer, writer
- Okhuofu "Blaq Jerzee" Oshoriameh – producer, writer
- Ronald "GuiltyBeatz" Banful - producer, writer
- Okiemute Oniko and Uzezi Oniko (Legendury Beatz) - producer

== Release history ==
Release history and formats for One Day You Will Understand
Region	Date	Format	Label
Various	10 June 2020	Streaming; digital download	emPawa Africa
