= Big Lean =

Canadian rapper

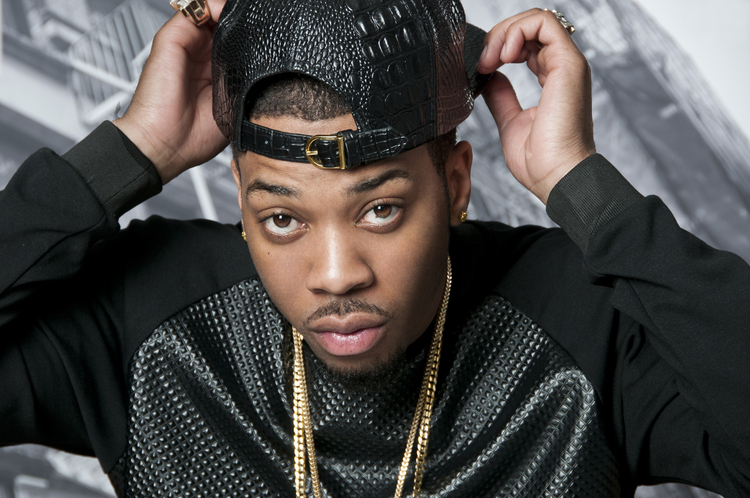
- Wright in May 2014

Background information
- Born: Lorenzo Lee-jae Wright; February 11, 1989 (age 37)
- Origin: Toronto, Ontario, Canada
- Genres: Canadian hip hop; hip hop
- Occupations: Rapper; singer; songwriter
- Years active: 2008–present
- Label: Da Degrees
- Children: 1
- Website: dadegrees.com

Lorenzo Lee-Jae Wright (born February 11, 1989), better known by his stage name Big Lean, is a Canadian rapper from Toronto, Ontario. Lean began making music in 2008, two years after his friend and rapper Blits tha god (rapper) was shot dead as he felt that he should carry on his friends legacy. He gained attention in 2011 being featured on the single "Reality" by DJ Charlie Brown released alongside other Toronto artists P. Reign, Belly and Jahvon. He is independently signed to the label Da Degrees.

He subsequently released his third mixtape Can't Stop Now in 2014 with features from Chief Keef, Juicy J and Chinx Drugz and his debut album Enough is Enough was released in 2015 with features from Nipsey Hussle, Juelz Santana and was executively produced by Lean's longtime friend, Boi-1da. The album received a 7/10 rating by Exclaim!.

After releasing a freestyle of "Leg Over", Big Lean was featured on the single In The Morning by Mr Eazi. The song peaked at number 7 on the Billboard charts and a music video released on March 1, 2017. Big Lean appeared on 6ixBuzz's 2018 compilation album 6ixUpsideDown, which peaked at 87 on the Canadian Albums Chart, with the single "M.I.A." alongside Safe.

== Early life ==
Lorenzo Lee-Jae Wright was born on February 11, 1989, and was raised in Parma Court which is located in the East York area of Toronto, Ontario. Both his parents were Jamaican immigrants and he was one of three children. He was left to be raised by his mother alone after his parents split up when he was a child. Lorenzo gained the nickname "Lean" as a child after a friend of his misheard his mother calling him "Lee", a shortened version of his middle name "Lee-Jae." Lorenzo went on to use the moniker "Big Lean" as his stage name. Lean has stated that his mother was very supportive in life and told him that he can achieve anything he put his mind too.

During his high school years, Wright was recruited in a top-level basketball program, the Scarborough Basketball Association, however, he dropped out due to financial problems. As a result, he began to sell drugs on the streets which often got him into trouble with law enforcement.

Big Lean's older brother, who was known by friend and family as "Bigga", died in 2002. A person Lean describes as a major influence in his life, stating that he never smoked marijuana because of his older brother. The loss of his older brother made Lean turn to the streets and focus less on his studies. Lean attended numerous high schools but due to his poor attendance, this led to his expulsion. He dropped out of high school before he finished his senior year due to frustration.

== Career ==
=== 2008–2011: Beginnings and early releases ===
Big Lean began making music at the age of 19, two years after his friend and rapper Blits (Kareme Parks) was shot dead as he felt that he should carry on his friends legacy. Lean started releasing numerous freestyles and tracks to little success. He released his debut mixtape I'm Here Now on November 25, 2010, where the majority of the production was handled by Boi-1da and a vocal feature from Belly. It also contained production from his childhood friend "Yung Tony" now known as OVO Hush, a mutual friend of Drake.

It wasn't until 2011 when he saw his first commercial breakthrough. DJ Charlie Brown released his first single "Reality", which saw him put together a collection of Toronto artists including P. Reign, Belly, Jahvon & Big Lean. It was released on February 9, 2011. This brought Lean into the spotlight of other commercially successful artists as well as the DJ entering the rap industry. He also released his debut single "You Got It Good" on March 22, 2011. Big Lean dropped his sophomore mixtape Something Gotta Give on October 11, 2011. It featured guest appearances from R.O.Z. and Sizzla, and Boi-1da served as executive producer of the album.

=== 2012–2016: Can't Stop Now & Enough is Enough ===
He released the single "My Lifestyle" on December 27, 2012, and featured Chief Keef. The following year, he released the single "Too much for TV" featuring Juicy J and the single "Squeeze" featuring Chinx Drugz with a music video released on September 6, 2013. All singles went on to be featured on his third mixtape "Can't Stop Now" was released on July 15, 2013.

Lean made a return to music in late 2014 with the release of "Everything's alright". It was produced by Pro Logic and was the first promotional single for his upcoming studio album. The music video contained cameos from Sizzla and Jimmy Prime. Big Lean released his debut studio album Enough is Enough on September 4, 2015. The album was also supported by two singles including "Benjamins" featuring Juelz Santana which was released on March 6, 2015 and the single "California Water" featuring Nipsey Hussle. A music video for the single was released a year later on June 8, 2016. The non-album singles "Wavy" featuring Halal Gang member Mo-G was released on February 29, 2016 and "More Than Music" was released on March 13, 2016. Big Lean released the single "Stamina" on September 11, 2016, after receiving a shoutout from Drake earlier in the year. Lean also made an appearance on the single "Ya Ya" by Baka Not Nice released on November 6, 2016.

=== 2017–present ===
A remix of his single "Stamina" featuring PartyNextDoor was released on January 7, 2017, and was placed on OVO Sound Radio and subsequently led to Big Lean supporting the artist on his international tour. In March 2017, he released the single "On Deck" After releasing a freestyle over "Leg Over", Big Lean was featured on the single In The Morning by Mr Eazi. The song peaked at number 7 on the Billboard charts on February 25, 2017, and a music video released on March 1, 2017. He collaborated with the afrobeats singer again in August 2017 on "Long Time" and was produced by Juls. In December 2017, Big Lean was on the Noisey's documentary 6IX RISING. The 75-minute documentary showcased Toronto's hip-hop scene alongside other Canadian rap artists.

Lean enlisted British rapper Giggs, to feature on his second track of 2018; "Hermes". The single was released by British media outlet GRM Daily on February 8, 2018. In the same year, Lean released the singles "Julie", "Don't Stop" and "Motivation". Big Lean was featured on 6ixBuzz's compilation album 6ixUpsideDown released on October 19, 2018, with the single "M.I.A." alongside Safe.

Lean signed Ryda to his independent label Da Degrees, the pair subsequently released the singles "Dumb Rich" on April 19, 2019, and "Drop" on June 28, 2019. During this time he also featured on Zoe Grind's song ATL alongside R.O.Z. He teamed up with Murda Beatz to release the single "Action" on July 26, 2019.

== Other Ventures ==
=== Da Degrees ===
Da Degrees is an independent record label co-founded by Canadian rapper Big Lean and business partner Lotto Max. The label also forms a hip hop collective for its currently signed artists. In 2010, Big Lean founded his own independent record label, Da Degrees (formerly known as 380 Degrees), with long time friend Joel Anthony Alexander (stage name; Lotto Max). Lean is currently self-signed to the label, having released all his mixtapes and albums through the label. Co-founder Lotto Max was killed in a drive-by shooting in his hometown of Parma Court on December 11, 2015, which led to Lean becoming the sole operator of the label.

One of the earliest artists signed to the label includes Lean's long time friend and rapper R.O.Z. who was signed since the formation of the label.

== Discography ==
=== Studio albums ===
- 2015: Enough is Enough

=== Mixtapes ===
- 2010: I'm Here Now
- 2011: Something Gotta Give
- 2013: Can't Stop Now

== Filmography ==
Film and Television
Year	Title	Role	Notes
2017	6IX RISING	Himself	Documentary showcasing Toronto's hip-hop featuring numerous Canadian rap artists.
