= DJ Aroma =

Ghanaian Disc Jockey

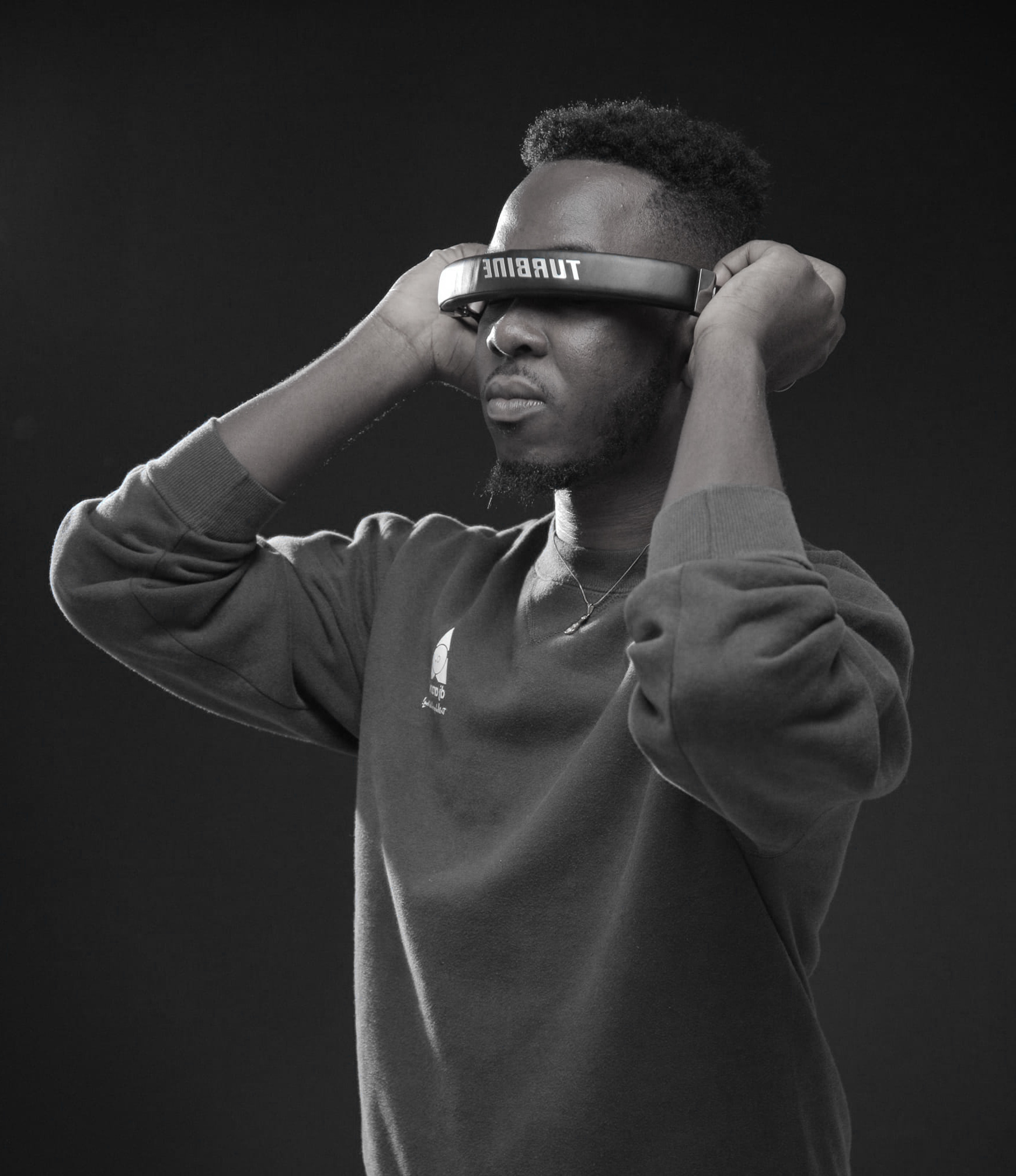
- Born: Collins Tetteh Nartey; Tema
- Education: Kwame Nkrumah University of Science and Technology
- Occupation: Disc Jockey
- Years active: 2015–present
- Website: https://djaromagh.com

Collins Tetteh Nartey, known professionally as DJ Aroma, is a Ghanaian disc jockey. He is the official DJ for the annual Detty Rave music festival in Ghana. He was listed among the top ten DJs in Africa in 2019. He was awarded the DJ of the Year at the 2021 3Music Awards and the Radio DJ of the Year at the 2020 RTP awards.

== Career ==
DJ Aroma started his career as he was in Kwame Nkrumah University of Science And Technology of which he made his playlist through VLC. He later moved to using VirtualDJ for his song mixes.

He currently works with Pure FM (Ghana) in Kumasi now as a host and a DJ for the afterdrive show after leaving Yfm (102.5). He was one of the DJ's to feature in Mr Eazi Detty Rave 2 Concert 2018.

== Awards and nominations ==
DJ Aroma won the Best Pub DJ of the Year in the 2018 edition of the Ghana DJ Awards.

Year	Award Ceremony	Award Description	Result	Reference
2015	Ghana Tertiary Awards	Most Influential Student DJ	Won	
2018	Ghana DJs Awards	Best pub DJ of the Year	Won	
2018	Ghana DJs Awards	Best DJ - Ashanti Region	Nominated	
2018	Ghana DJs Awards	Best Event Dj of the year	Nominated	
2019	Ghana DJs Awards	Best Dj Of The Year	Nominated	
2019	Ghana DJs Awards	Best DJ Of Ashanti Region	Won	
2020	RTP Awards	Radio DJ Of The Year	Won	
2020	Ghana DJs Awards	Central Zone DJ of the Year	Won	
2021	3Music Awards	DJ of the Year	Won	

== Notable Performances ==
- Ghana Meets Naija 2019
- DJ Awards Pub Fest
- Detty Rave 2
- Road to Detty Rave

== Discography ==
=== Singles ===
==== 2020 ====
- God Flow feat. Sarkodie, Medikal, Teephlow, RJZ & $pacely
