= Enough Is Enough (Big Lean album) =

Studio album by Big Lean
- Released: September 4, 2015
- Recorded: 2013–15
- Genre: Canadian hip hop
- Length: 45:54
- Label: Da Degrees

Big Lean chronology
Can't Stop Now (2013)	Enough Is Enough (2015)

Singles from Enough Is Enough
- 1. "Benjamins" Released: March 6, 2015; 2. "California Water" Released: June 8, 2016

Enough Is Enough is the debut studio album by Canadian rapper Big Lean.

== Background ==
The album was released on September 4, 2015. The album was supported by two singles including "Benjamins", featuring Juelz Santana, which was released on March 6, 2015, and "California Water" featuring Nipsey Hussle. A music video for the single was released a year later on June 8, 2016.

== Track listing ==
No.	Title	Writer(s)	Producer(s)	Length
1.	"I Am"	Lorenzo Wright	Pro Logic	3:19
2.	"Everyday"	Lorenzo Wright	Boi-1da	3:28
3.	"Bounce Back"	Lorenzo Wright	ZALE; Boi-1da	2:32
4.	"California Water (Featuring Nipsey Hussle)"	Lorenzo Wright; Ermias Asghedom	Boi-1da	3:27
5.	"Enough Is Enough"	Lorenzo Wright	Boi-1da	3:46
6.	"Benjamins (Featuring Juelz Santana)"	Lorenzo Wright; LaRon James	Boi-1da	3:08
7.	"Pressin"	Lorenzo Wright	2Epik	3:18
8.	"These Days"	Lorenzo Wright	Maven Boys	2:57
9.	"Ventilation"	Lorenzo Wright	Boi-1da	2:23
10.	"Eyes on Me"	Lorenzo Wright	2Epik; Boi-1da	3:35
11.	"Roll Out"	Lorenzo Wright	2Epik; Pro Logic	3:43
12.	"Everything's Alright"	Lorenzo Wright	Pro Logic	2:47
13.	"Run It All Up (Featuring Teddybear)"	Lorenzo Wright; Hudson Alexander	Maven Boys	3:32
14.	"I Need More"	Lorenzo Wright	Pro Logic	3:59
Total length:				45:54

== Critical reception ==
Professional ratings
Review scores
Source	Rating
Exclaim!	7/10

Exclaim! gave the album a 7/10, describing the album as "the underdog rapper's humble beginnings that define him and will soon push him into the spotlight".
