= In the Morning (Mr Eazi song) =

Single by Mr Eazi featuring Big Lean

from the album Life is Eazi, Vol. 1 - Accra to Lagos
- Released: 11 February 2017
- Genre: Afrobeats
- Label: Universal
- Songwriters: Mr Eazi; Big Lean
- Producer: Legendury Beatz

Mr Eazi singles chronology
"Tilapia" (2017)	"In the Morning" (2017)	"Fight" (2017)

Big Lean singles chronology
"Stamina" (2016)	"In the Morning" (2017)	"Long Time" (2017)

"In the Morning" is a song by Mr Eazi and features vocals from Big Lean. It was released on 11 February 2017 and peaked at number 7 on the Billboard World Digital Song Sales chart. The song peaked at number 7 on the Billboard charts on February 25, 2017, and a music video released on March 1, 2017. He collaborated with the Canadian rapperagain in August 2017 on "Long Time" and was produced by Juls. The song went on to be the lead single for Mr Eazi's second mixtape, Life Is Eazi, Vol. 1 – Accra To Lagos, was released on 10 February 2017. The mixtape was initially scheduled for release on 11 February 2017. It debuted at number 4 on the Billboard World Albums chart.

== Track listing ==
Digital download
No.	Title	Length
1.	"In The Morning"	3:36

== Charts ==
Chart (2017)	Peak position
US World Digital Song Sales (Billboard)	7
