= Michaël Brun =

Haitian musician (born 1992)

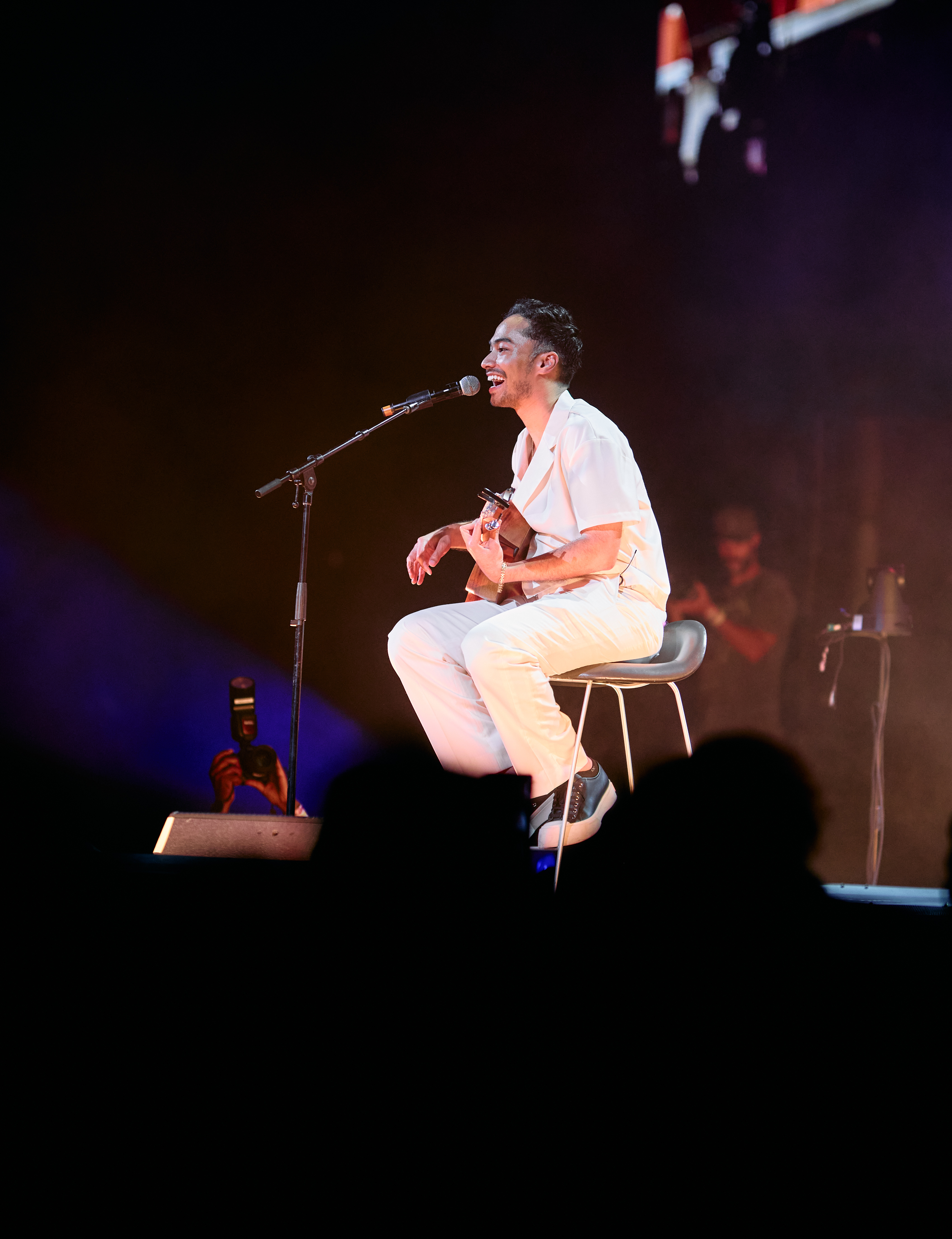
- Brun in June 2025

Background information
- Born: 19 May 1992 (age 34); Port-au-Prince, Haiti
- Genres: Progressive house; electro house; kompa; rara
- Occupations: DJ; producer
- Instruments: Digital audio workstation; keyboard; synthesizers; violin; guitar
- Years active: 2011–present
- Labels: Phazing Records; Spinnin Records; Revealed Recordings; S2 Records; Columbia Records; Musical Freedom; Kid Coconut; Astralwerks
- Website: michaelbrun.com

Michaël Brun (born 19 May 1992) is a Haitian and Guyanese DJ and record producer based in New York, known for blending electronic music with traditional Haitian styles such as kompa and rara. He released his debut EP Gravity in 2013 and founded the record label Kid Coconut in 2014, to showcase Haitian music and develop Haitian artists. In 2016 he founded his BAYO event series, a philanthropic platform centred around Haitian and Caribbean culture and community. In 2018, he released the single "Positivo" with J Balvin, which became Telemundo's theme song for the 2018 FIFA World Cup. His debut album, Lokal, was released on June 26, 2019. In 2025, Brun released his single "Touchdown", which debuted as the anthem for the 2025 NFL Wild Card Weekend.

== Early life and education ==
Brun was born and raised in Port-au-Prince, Haiti, to a Guyanese mother and Haitian father. He also has French Haitian, Portuguese, Chinese Guyanese, and Indo-Guyanese ancestry. Growing up he was exposed to the music of Caribbean Sextet and Tabou Combo, which influenced his musical tastes. His father was in a band called Skandal in the '90s. Brun began playing piano, violin and guitar at a young age.

He initially intended to have a career as a pediatrician. At 15, he began DJing and producing his own electronic music tracks as a hobby. He attended Culver Military Academy in Indiana and then Davidson College in North Carolina as a pre-med student, while continuing to work on his music production.

== Music career ==
=== 2011-2017: Early career, EDM roots and Haitian influences ===
Brun was one of the first electronic music artists in Haiti. On June 29, 2011, he released the 4-track single Shades of Grey on S2 Records. Primarily styled as progressive house, Brun released "Dawn," on Dutch DJ Hardwell's Revealed Recordings on December 21, 2011. Dirty South signed Brun to his label Phazing Records shortly after, releasing Brun's next single "Rise". Brun also joined Dirty South on tour in Miami. Around that time, he started performing at major events including Coachella and Electric Daisy Carnival, and decided to take a hiatus from medical school.

In 2012, Brun released the tracks "Rift" with Dirty South and "Synergy" with Special Features. Brun released his debut EP Gravity in September 2013, which reached number 2 on the Beatport charts. Also in 2013 he remixed tracks for artists such as Alicia Keys, Calvin Harris and Armin van Buuren. In March 2014, Brun became the first Haitian to play at Ultra Music Festival. That year he also performed at the Moonrise Festival in Baltimore, and at Coachella. He was nominated for World's Best EDM Artist at the World Music Awards.

==== Kid Coconut ====
In 2014 he founded his own label, Kid Coconut, with the intent to showcase Haitian music and develop Haitian artists. In August 2014 Brun released the single "Zenith", which was the first release on Kid Coconut. In June 2015, he released "See You Soon", on Kid Coconut. He then released a collaboration with Roy English titled "Tongue Tied July".

==== 2016–17: "Wherever I Go" single, tour and festival, "Gaya" ====
In 2015 he performed at clubs including Create (Los Angeles), Temple (San Francisco), Union Nightclub (Toronto), and Story (Miami), and also appeared at the Billboard Hot 100 Festival. In January 2016, Brun released "Wherever I Go", a collaboration with Artists for Peace and Justice's Audio Institute. He then embarked on his first North American Tour, titled the Wherever I Go Tour, followed by the creation of the Wherever I Go Festival in Port-au-Prince, Haiti.

In May 2016, he collaborated with American artist The Ready Set and released a remix to The Ready Set's song Good Enough which charted at number 40 on US Billboard Dance/Mix Show Airplay. In August 2016, he released a collaboration with Louie for the Netflix film XOXO, titled "All I Ever Wanted". In October 2016, he announced Haitian Heat, a Haitian music playlist that he curates for Spotify. In January 2017, he released "Gaya", a collaboration with Haitian roots music collective Lakou Mizik and Haitian pop artist J. Perry. He followed "Gaya" with remixes for OneRepublic, Maxwell, Kesha, Major Lazer and FLETCHER. He released "Easy On My Love" in December 2017.

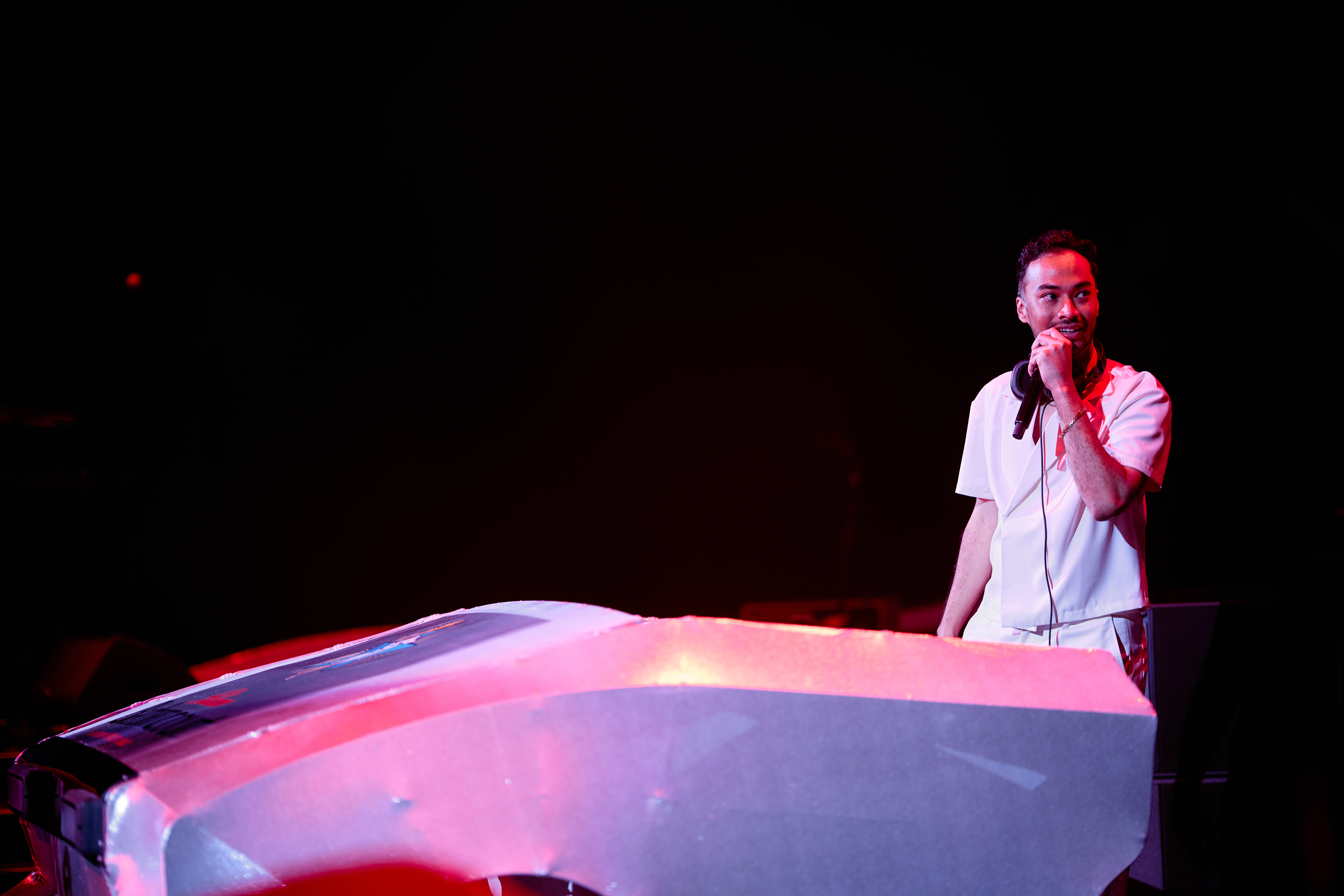
Brun in 2025

=== 2018–19: Breakthrough and debut album ===
In 2018, as part of collaborations with artists from around the world to bring Haitian sounds into the mainstream, he released the single "Positivo" with Latin singer J Balvin. It was the theme song for Telemundo's 2018 FIFA World Cup coverage, and as of March 2019, has over 12 million views on YouTube. Brun also opened for J Balvin on his 2018 Vibras tour.

In 2017, Brun began experimenting with songs that would bridge the gap between Nigerian afrobeat and Haitian music. This led to the concept behind his debut album Lokal, released on Kid Coconut on June 26, 2019. The album's first single was "Akwaaba Ayiti", a reworking of a song by Mr Eazi. The nine-track album features collaborations with artists including Major Lazer, Win Butler and Regine Chassagne of Arcade Fire, J. Perry, Eddy François, and BélO. The track "Nouvo Jenerasyon" includes a sample of a song from his father's konpa band Skandal. In 2019, he played a set at Coachella.

He also established the block-party event series BAYO during this period.

=== 2020-present ===
In 2020 he released the Melanin EP. In 2023 he released the FAMI Summer EP, which included the single Jessica, a track that experienced particular success on social media, with FAMI Vol. 1 being released in 2025.

On April 4, 2023, Astralwerks, an American record label owned by Universal Music Group, announced it had signed Brun. His first Astralwerks single, "Clueless" (featuring Oxlade), was released in February 2023. On November 13, 2024, Brun released "Safe" a collaboration single with John Legend & Rutshelle Guillaume. On January 31, 2025, Brun released his single "Touchdown", featuring J Balvin, Beenie Man, Bounty Killer, and Tasan. The track debuted as the anthem for the 2025 NFL Wild Card Weekend on ESPN.

As a producer he has worked with artists including Davido, Victoria Monét, Keblack, Wale, Diplo, Ed Sheeran, among others.

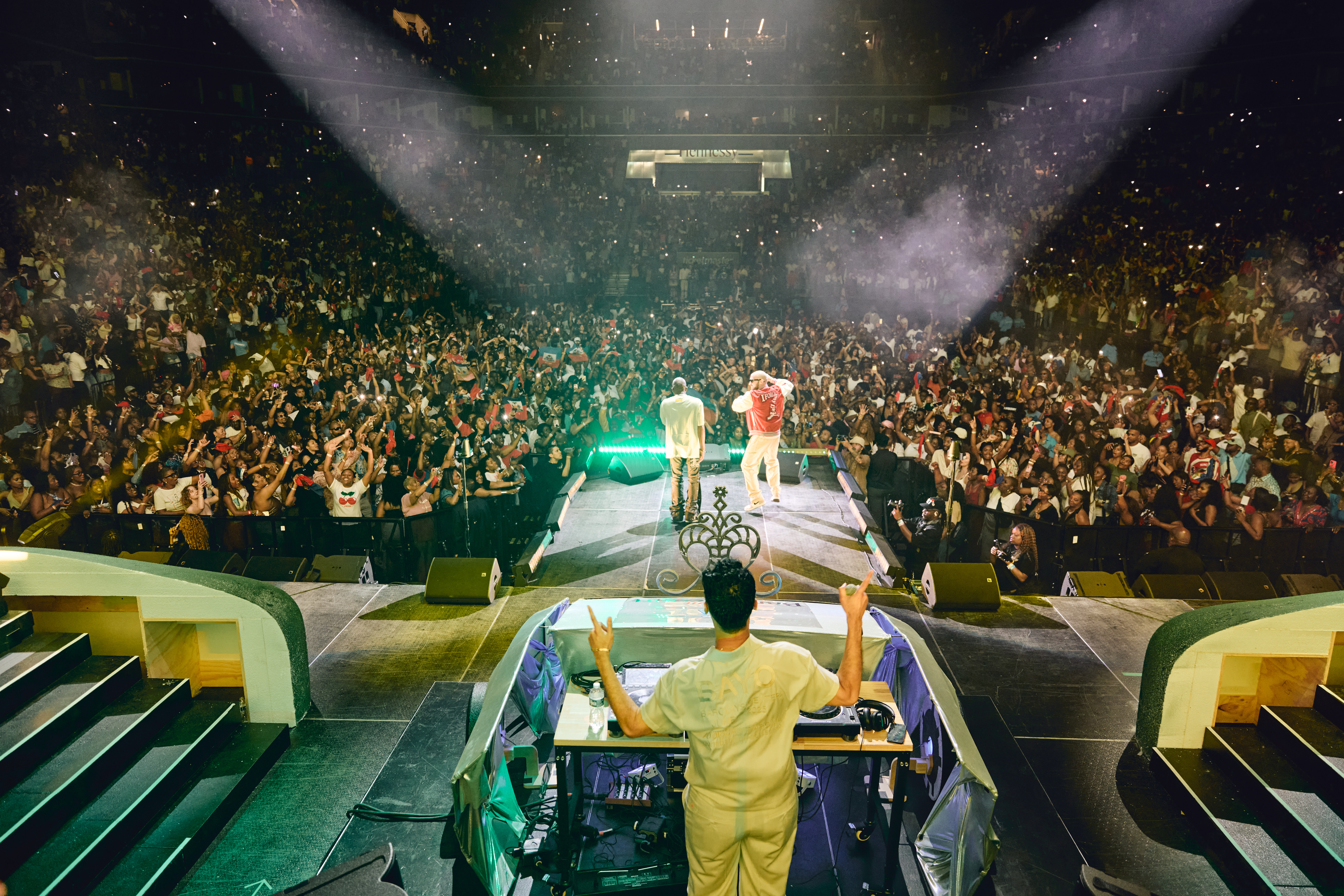
Brun performing at BAYO in New York, June 2025, at Barclays Center

=== BAYO ===
Brun founded his BAYO event series in 2016. Originally a Haitian block-party, centered around Haitian and Caribbean culture and community, the word “BAYO” means “to give” in Haitian Creole. The festival is both culturally focused and a philanthropic platform, and now takes place in multiple locations, including New York and Boston. BAYO has featured artists such as J Balvin and Wyclef Jean. Speakers have included Zohran Mamdani (at the NYC edition) and Michelle Wu (at the Boston edition).

== Philanthropy ==
To honor his late mother, Sharon Lee Brun, Brun established a fund connected to the BAYO initiative, supporting education and community programs in Haiti. He is also an ambassador for the nonprofit Artists for Peace and Justice, and mentors youth through Haiti's Audio Institute.

== Musical style and influences ==
Brun blends electronic dance music (progressive house, electro-house) with Haitian musical styles such as kompa and rara. He describes Haitian musical heritage (e.g., Caribbean Sextet, Tabou Combo) as formative. His equipment includes digital audio workstations, keyboards, synthesizers, violin and guitar.

== Personal life ==
Brun lives in Brooklyn, New York. He continues to engage actively with Haitian community and musical heritage.

== Awards and nominations ==
| Year | Award | Nominated work | Category | Result |
|---|---|---|---|---|
| 2014 | World Music Award | Michaël Brun | World's Best EDM Artist | Nominated |

| Year | Award | Nominated work | Category | Result |
|---|---|---|---|---|
| 2020 | Latin Grammy Awards | Michaël Brun, for his production/writing on J Balvin's Colores | Best Urban Music Album | Won |

== Discography ==
=== Albums ===
Studio albums by Michael Brun
| Year | Title | Release details |
|---|---|---|
| 2019 | Lokal | Released: 26 June 2019; Label: Kid Coconut; Format: Digital download |
| 2025 | Fami Vol. 1 | Released: 11 July 2025; Label: Astralwerks; Format: Digital download |

=== Extended plays ===
Extended plays by Michaël Brun
| Year | Title | Release details |
|---|---|---|
| 2013 | Gravity | Released: 2013; Label: Phazing (PH022); Format: Digital download |

=== Singles ===
Singles by Michaël Brun
| Year | Title | Album | Release details |
|---|---|---|---|
| 2011 | "Prime" (with Derrick Rouseeau) | Non-album single | Versuz Essentials (April 29, 2011) |
| 2011 | "Shades of Grey" (with Remy Joel and Xpression) | 4-track single | S2 Records (June 29, 2011) |
| 2011 | "Dawn" | 2-track single | Revealed Recordings (December 19, 2011) |
| 2012 | "Rise" (Dirty South Edit) | Non-album singles | Phazing (March 19, 2012) |
| 2012 | "Synergy" (with Special Features) | Non-album singles | Phazing (April 18, 2012) |
| 2012 | "Rift" (with Dirty South) | Non-album singles | Phazing (November 10, 2012) |
| 2013 | "Gravity" | Gravity EP | Phazing (Oct 8, 2013) |
| 2013 | "Halfway" (featuring Zashanell) | Gravity EP | Phazing (Oct 8, 2013) |
| 2013 | "Antares" | Gravity EP | Phazing (Oct 8, 2013) |
| 2014 | "Zenith" | Non-album singles | Kid Coconut (August 4, 2014) |
| 2014 | "Sun In Your Eyes" (with DubVision featuring Tom Cane) | Non-album singles | Kid Coconut (September 15, 2014) |
| 2015 | "Woo" (with Dirty Twist | Non-album singles | Kid Coconut (April 20, 2015) |
| 2015 | "See You Soon" (with Rune RK featuring Denny White) | Non-album singles | Kid Coconut (June 2, 2015) |
| 2015 | "Tongue Tied July" (with Roy English) | Non-album singles | Kid Coconut (August 7, 2015) |
| 2015 | "Vintage" (with Rayven & Valexx) | Non-album singles | Kid Coconut (September 25, 2015) |
| 2015 | "Check This Out" (with Still Young) | Non-album singles | Size Records (October 16, 2015) |
| 2016 | "Wherever I Go" (with The Audio Institute) | Non-album singles | Kid Coconut (January 29, 2016) |
| 2016 | "Omega" (with Aspyer) | Non-album singles | Kid Coconut (April 22, 2016) |
| 2016 | "Good Enough" (with The Ready Set) | Non-album singles | Hopeless Records (May 18, 2016) |
| 2016 | "All I Ever Wanted" (featuring Louie) | XOXO: The Album | Kid Coconut (August 3, 2016) |
| 2016 | "Summer Dreams" (with Marcio Lama) | Non-album singles | Kid Coconut (September 9, 2016) |
| 2016 | "Jupiter" (featuring Roy English and Uni) | Non-album singles | Kid Coconut (October 15, 2016) |
| 2017 | "Gaya" (with Lakou Mizik & J. Perry) | Non-album singles | Kid Coconut (February 17, 2017) |
| 2017 | "Danse Konsa" (with Strong G) | Non-album singles | Kid Coconut (August 9, 2017) |
| 2017 | "Easy On My Love" (with Janelle Kroll) | Non-album singles | Kid Coconut (December 15, 2017) |
| 2018 | "Bayo" (featuring Strong G, Baky and J Perry) | Non-album singles | Kid Coconut (February 16, 2018) |
| 2018 | "Soweto" (with Shirazee) | Non-album singles | Kid Coconut (June 22, 2018) |
| 2018 | "Spice" (with Kah-Lo) | Non-album singles | Kid Coconut (August 31, 2018) |
| 2019 | "How About This" (with Uniiqu3) | Non-album singles | Kid Coconut (February 22, 2019) |
| 2019 | "Akwaaba Ayiti" (featuring DJ Bullet, J. Perry and Dro) | Lokal | Kid Coconut (June 12, 2019) |
| 2020 | "Melanin" (with Kah-Lo) | Non-album singles | Self-released (August 19, 2020) |
| 2023 | "Clueless" (with Oxlade) | Fami Vol. 1 | Astralwerks (February 18, 2023) |
| 2023 | "Sak Pase" (with Saint Levant & Lolo Zouaï) | Fami Vol. 1 | Self-released (June 9, 2023) |
| 2023 | "Jessica (with J Balvin, Saint Jhn & J. Perry featuring Charly Black) | Fami Vol. 1 | Self-released (July 19, 2023) |
| 2023 | "Coming Your Way" (with Anne-Marie & Becky G) | Fami Vol. 1 | Astralwerks (August 16, 2023) |
| 2024 | "Safe" (with John Legend & Rutshelle Guillaume) | Fami Vol. 1 | Self-released (November 13, 2024) |
| 2025 | "Touchdown" (with J Balvin & Beenie Man featuring Bounty Killer & Tasan) | Fami Vol. 1 | Self-released (January 31, 2025) |
| 2025 | "Elevate" (with Shirazee) | Fami Vol. 1 | Astralwerks (30 May 2025) |

=== As featured artist ===
List of singles as featured artist
| Year | Title | Album | Release details |
|---|---|---|---|
| 2021 | "Trouble" (Aluna, featuring Michaël Brun and Alicai Harvey) | Non-album singles | Mad Decent (April 23, 2021) |
| 2022 | "Liki Tiki" (Kes, featuring Michaël Brunand J Perry) | Man With No Door | Album release: Ineffable Records (March 29, 2024) |
| 2024 | "Decirte Lo Que Siento" (DannyLux, featuring Michaël Brunand Ariza) | Non-album singles | Warner Music Latina (May 3, 2024) |
| 2024 | "Playa Noche" (Cimafunk, featuring Michaël Brunand Keyon Harrold) | Pa' Tu Cuerpa | Mala Cabeza Records (August 23, 2024) |
| 2024 | "Parle en sah" (KeBlack, featuring Michaël Brun) | Non-album singles | Motema Records (November 21, 2024) |
| 2024 | "Comment te remplacer" (Carbonne, featuring Michaël Brunand Dystinct) | Non-album singles | PNM Production (December 6, 2024) |

=== Production credits ===
List of singles produced by Brun
| Year | Title | Artist | Album |
|---|---|---|---|
| 2020 | Arcoíris | J Balvin | Colores |
| 2020 | Azul | J Balvin | Colores |
| 2020 | Gris | J Balvin | Colores |
| 2020 | Irrational | Shay Lia | Solaris |
| 2021 | Ego | J Balvin | JOSE (Deluxe Edition) |
| 2021 | Qué Rico Fuera | Ricky Martin, Paloma Mami | Non-album singles |
| 2022 | Forever my love | J Balvin, Ed Sheeran | Non-album singles |
| 2022 | M&Ms for Breakfast | Naïka | Transitions (EP) |
| 2023 | Make It Easy | Adekunle Gold (with Coco Jones) | Tequila Ever After |
| 2023 | Dientes | J Balvin, USHER, DJ Khaled | Non-album singles |
| 2023 | Break Bread | Berhana | Non-album singles |
| 2023 | Body Touching Body | Buju Banton, Victoria Monét | Born for Greatness |
| 2024 | Playa Noche | Cimafunk | Pa' Tu Cuerpa |
| 2024 | 6:45 | Naïka | Non-album singles |
| 2024 | Veinti | Nicki Nicole | NAIKI |
| 2025 | Uuu | J Balvin, Stormzy | Mixteip |
| 2025 | Offa Me | Davido, Victoria Monét | Non-album singles |
| 2026 | "One track mind" | Naïka | Non-album singles |

=== Remixes ===
| Year | Title | Original artist | Release details |
|---|---|---|---|
| 2011 | "Awooga" (Michaël Brun Remix) | Calvin Harris | |
| 2011 | "Alive" (Michaël Brun Remix) | Dirty South and Thomas Gold featuring Kate Elsworth | |
| 2011 | "Dancing" (Michaël Brun Remix) | Delivio Reavon and Aaron Gill featuring Phatt | |
| 2012 | "Burn Forever" (Michaël Brun Remix) | Those Usual Suspects and Nordean | |
| 2012 | "Nuclear Seasons" (Michaël Brun Remix) | Charli XCX | |
| 2012 | "Heartbeat" (Michaël Brun Remix) | Childish Gambino | Glassnote |
| 2013 | "Power of You and Me" (Michaël Brun Remix) | Rune RK featuring Andreas Moe | |
| 2013 | "Your Heart" (Michaël Brun Remix) | Dirty South featuring Joe Gil | |
| 2013 | "Until the End" (Michaël Brun Remix) | Dirty South feat. Joe Gil | |
| 2013 | "Steal You Away" (Michaël Brun Remix) | Dash Berlin and Alexander Popov | |
| 2013 | "Fire We Make" (Michaël Brun Remix) | Alicia Keys and Maxwell | |
| 2013 | "Take Me" (Michaël Brun Remix) | Tiesto featuring Kyler England | Musical Freedom |
| 2013 | "Sound of the Drums" (Michaël Brun Remix) | Armin van Buuren featuring Laura Jansen | |
| 2013 | "Thinking About You" (Michaël Brun Remix) | Calvin Harris featuring Ayah Marar | Columbia (Aug 4, 2013) |
| 2014 | "Shadow of the Sun" (Michaël Brun Remix) | Max Elto | |
| 2014 | "Arkham" (Michaël Brun Mix) | Lee Carter, Oliver Chang and Daniel Etienne | |
| 2014 | "Our Story" (Michaël Brun Remix) | Mako | |
| 2015 | "Arkham" (Michaël Brun Mix) | Lee Carter, Oliver Chang and Daniel Etienne | February 25, 2015 |
| 2015 | "Ivory" (Michaël Brun Mix) | Shanahan | March 9, 2015 |
| 2015 | "What I Did For Love" (Michaël Brun Remix) | David Guetta featuring Emeli Sandé | April 16, 2015 |
| 2015 | "Love Will Never Let You Down" (Michaël Brun Remix) | Eddie Thoneick and Abel Ramos featuring James Walsh | May 25, 2015 |
| 2015 | "Blue Sky" (Michaël Brun Remix) | Feenixpawl and Jason Forte featuring Mary Jane Smith | June 19, 2015 |
| 2015 | "I Can Change" (Michaël Brun Remix) | Brandon Flowers | September 11, 2015 (Island) |
| 2015 | "Ardor" (Michaël Brun Edit) | No Regular and Pessto | December 29, 2015 |
| 2016 | "Awakening" (Michaël Brun Mix) | Baha | March 25, 2016 |
| 2016 | "Move That Body" (Michaël Brun Mix) | Lee Carter, Japaroll and Funk Machine | July 15, 2016 |
| 2016 | "Lake By The Ocean" (Michaël Brun Remix) | Maxwell | July 19, 2016 (Columbia) |
| 2016 | "U" (Michaël Brun Remix) | Ben Alessi | December 16, 2016 (Kid Coconut) |
| 2017 | "Wasted Youth" (Michaël Brun Remix) | Fletcher | March 8, 2017 (Self-released) |
| 2017 | "Lift Me Up" (Michaël Brun Remix) | OneRepublic | June 8, 2017 (Mosley, Interscope) |
| 2018 | "Sunny Days" (Michaël Brun Remix) | Janelle Kroll | March 23, 2018 |
| 2019 | "Give Dem" (Michaël Brun Remix) | Diplo and Blond:ish featuring Kah-Lo | June 24, 2019 (Mad Decent) |
| 2021 | "Dumebi" (Michaël Brun Remix) | Rema, Mavins and Becky G | April 1, 2021 |
| 2023 | Party Girls (Michaël Brun Dancehall Remix) | Victoria Monét featuring Buju Banton | May 26, 2023 |

== Radio appearances ==
Radio episodes featuring Michaël Brun
| 2013 | Show | Episode | Date and details |
|---|---|---|---|
| 2013 | Group Therapy Radio | Episode 055 with Above & Beyond: Guest Mix by Michaël Brun | November 29, 2013 |
| 2015 | Diplo and Friends | Episode: Michaël Brun & Two Fresh | April 19, 2015 |
| 2019 | Diplo and Friends | Episode: Michaël Brun in the mix | July 28, 2019 |
