= Kokrobite =

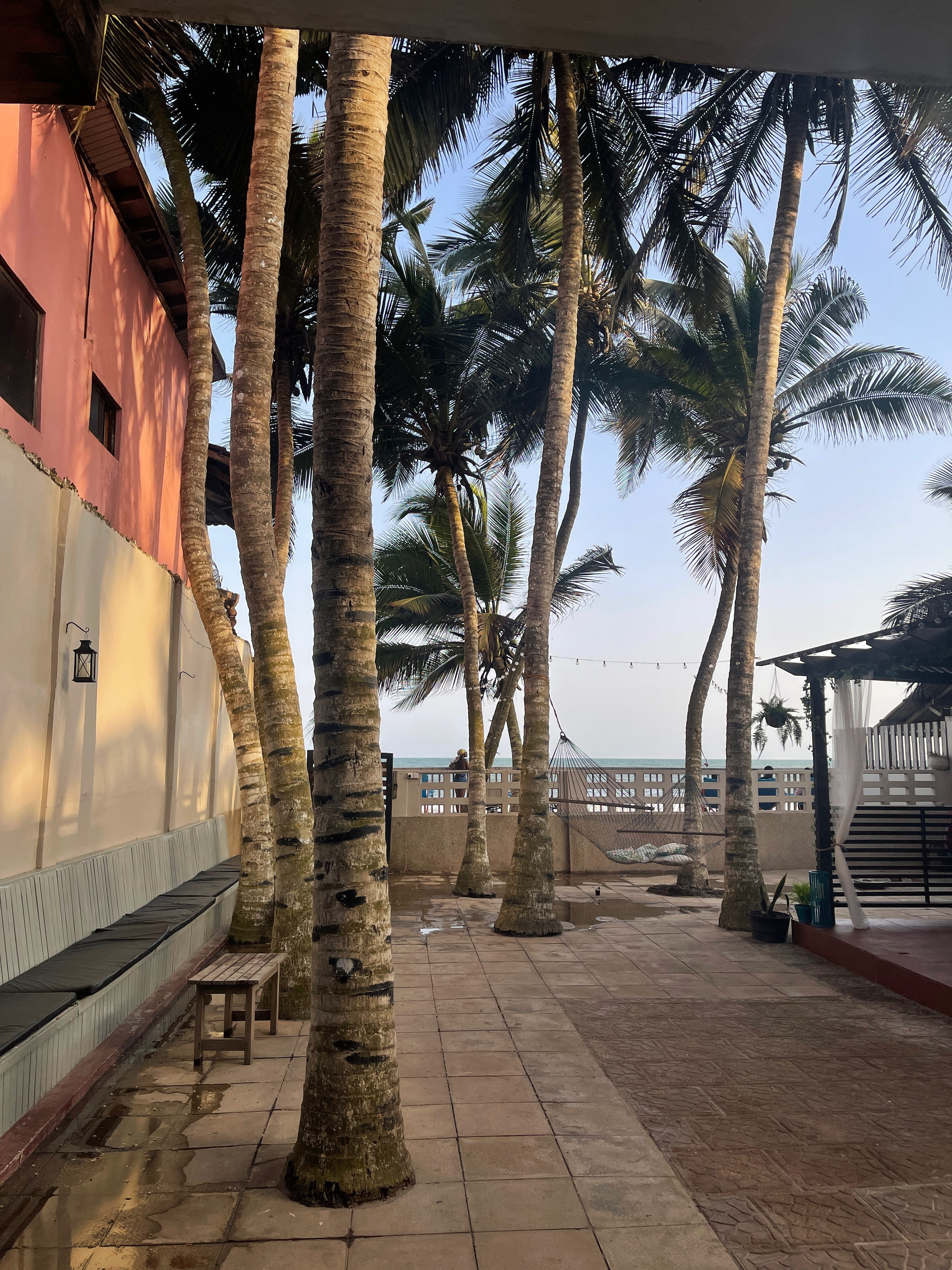

- Location in Ghana
- Coordinates: 5°30′N 0°22′W
- Country: Ghana
- Region: Greater Accra Region

Kokrobite is a town along the Atlantic coast, 30 km (19 mi) to the west of Accra the capital city of Ghana. It is known for traditional sea fishing, its white-sand beaches and its lively nightlife. Kokrobite is a popular destination for tourists, backpackers and international volunteers seeking beaches and a break from the busy capital city.

Kokrobite has a population of between 4000 and 6000 according to the Ghana Statistics Department 2003 Survey. The main local dialect is Ga, but Twi and English are also widely spoken.

Mustapha Tetty Addy's Academy of African Music and Arts (AAMA) is located at Kokrobite.

== Tourism ==
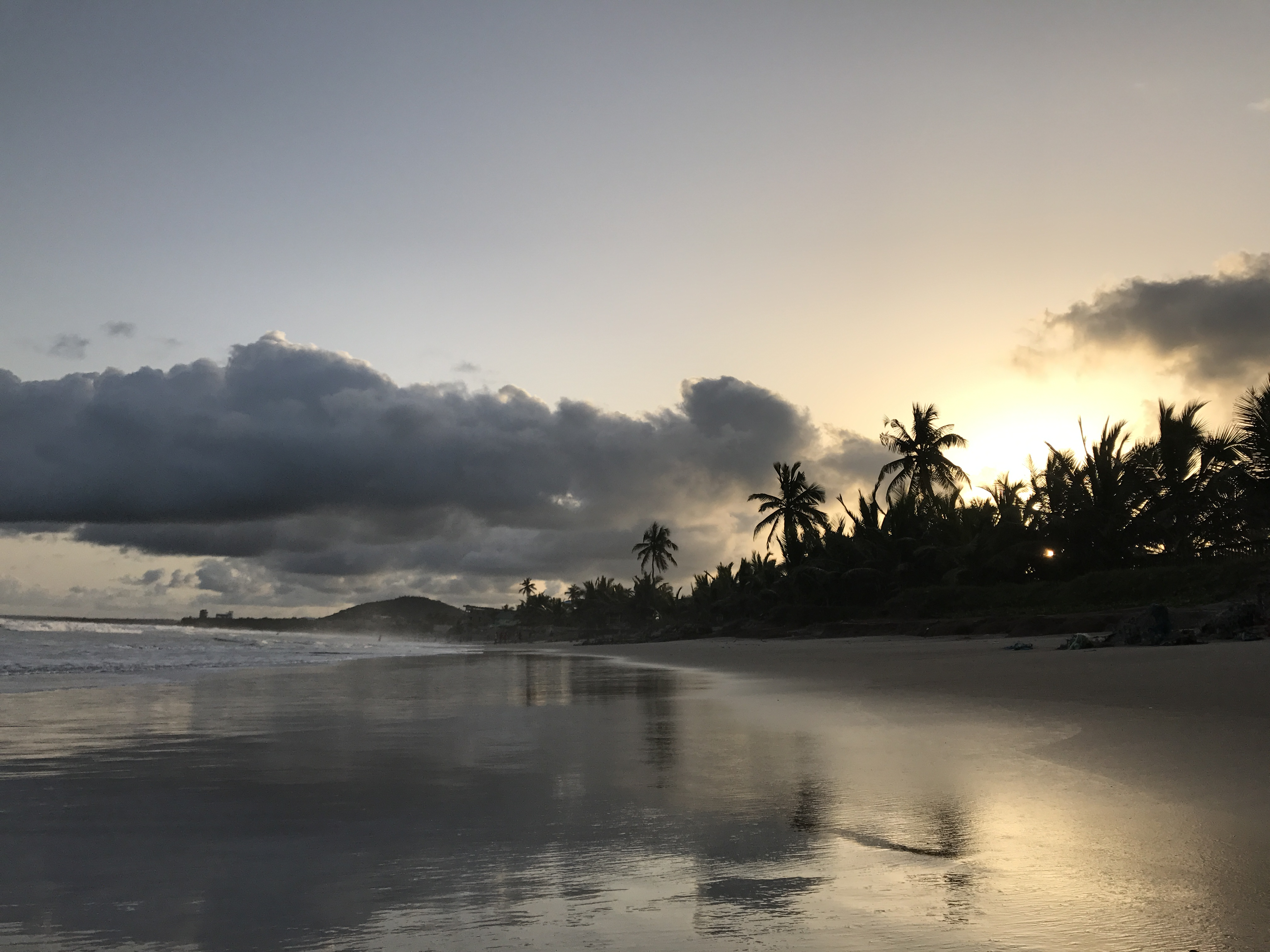
A beach in Kokrobite in Accra

Year-round on weekends, and particularly on public holidays, people from all over Ghana descend on Kokrobite to enjoy food, dance and music on the beach. However, in the month of May local people observe the traditional festival of 'Homowo', during which time noise making and large social events are banned.
