= Mr Eazi =

Nigerian singer (born 1991)

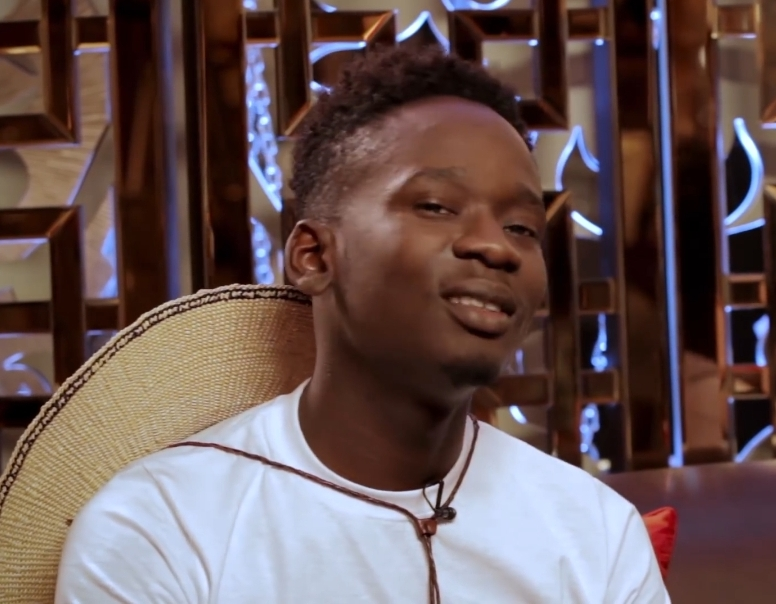
- Mr Eazi in 2016
- Born: Oluwatosin Oluwole Ajibade; 19 July 1991 (age 35); Port Harcourt, Rivers State
- Other name: Don Eazi
- Education: KNUST
- Occupations: Singer; songwriter; record executive
- Spouse: Temi Otedola (m. 2025)
- Musical career
- Genres: Banku; Afrobeats
- Years active: 2012–present
- Labels: Banku Music; emPawa Africa
- Website: mreazi.com

Oluwatosin Oluwole Ajibade (born 19 July 1991), better known by his stage name Mr Eazi, is a Nigerian singer, songwriter, and record executive. He is the pioneer of Banku music, a fusion sound he describes as a mixture of Ghanaian highlife and Nigerian chord progressions and patterns. Mr Eazi relocated to Kumasi in 2008 and enrolled at KNUST, where he began booking artists to perform at college parties. He showed interest in music after recording a guest verse on "My Life", a song that gained traction and became a popular record at KNUST. Mr Eazi released his debut mixtape, About to Blow, in 2013. He gained an international audience following the release of the Efya-assisted single "Skin Tight". His second mixtape, Life Is Eazi, Vol. 1 – Accra to Lagos, was released in 2017.

== Life and career ==
=== Early life and education ===
Oluwatosin Oluwole Ajibade was born in Port Harcourt, the capital of Rivers State. He grew up in an entrepreneurial home and is a member of the Yoruba ethnic group. His mother was a business owner and his father owns a private aviation consulting practice. While attending primary school in Lagos, Mr Eazi had a brief stint in the school's choir. During his upbringing, he listened to songs his dad would play for the family while having breakfast. At age 16, Mr Eazi relocated to Ghana to further his educational endeavors, enrolling in the mechanical engineering program at Kwame Nkrumah University of Science and Technology (KNUST). Mr Eazi started recording music during his time at the school, and contributed guest vocals to the track "My Life". The song gained traction and became a popular record at KNUST. Before that, he established a party and promotion company called Swagger Entertainment.

When he was 23 years old, he returned to Nigeria and opened an e-commerce platform. In an interview with The Guardian newspaper, he said he briefly worked for Schlumberger upon returning to Nigeria. He also said his business ventures included soft drinks import, gold mining, and food distribution. Moreover, he told Highsnobiety that he started about six business ventures. In 2014, Mr Eazi quit being a club promoter after an artist failed to show up for the largest party he attempted to throw.

=== 2013–2015: About to Blow and other releases ===
Mr Eazi released his 13-track debut mixtape, About to Blow, in July 2013. It yielded the singles "Pipi Dance" and "Bankulize". The former was released in mid-2012, while the latter was released in 2013. Mr Eazi recorded the mixtape with producer Klu and released it within a week. The Fader magazine describes the mixtape as a "heavily dancehall-leaning SoundCloud playlist". Prior to releasing the mixtape, Mr Eazi worked with producers such as Magnom, Peeweezle, Nshona, Klumonsta, D'Tunes, and E-Kelly. Moreover, he was featured on Stay Jay's "Baby Lace" and Lousika's "Knockout". In 2014, Mr Eazi moved back to Nigeria and was contacted by British-Ghanaian producer Juls, who got a hold of some of his recordings. Due to not being able to locate the audio files of his old recordings, his attempt at working with Juls stalled for a long time. He eventually retrieved his audio files and sent them to Juls, who made a new beat and created the artwork for the mixtape's second single "Bankulize". The song features vocals by Ghanaian hiplife artist Pappy Kojo and was released in November 2014. The official remix of "Bankulize" features vocals by Burna Boy and was released in September 2016. Mr Eazi premiered the remix on Ebro Darden's Beats 1 radio show a month earlier.

In August 2015, Mr Eazi released the dancehall-influenced track "Skin Tight", which features vocals by Efya and was produced by DJ Juls. In an interview with Complex magazine, Mr Eazi described the song as a "fusion". He said he spoke Ghanaian pidgin on the delivery and used Nigerian melodies. In August 2016, Nigerian record producer Cobhams Asuquo released a rendition of the song. DJ Caise released a house remix of the song in September 2016, while Terry G collaborated with Mr Eazi to release a remix of the song. In April 2017, "Skin Tight" was featured in an ad for the vodka brand Ciroc.

Mr Eazi was featured on Eugy's 2016 hit single "Dance for Me". The Guardian newspaper included the song on its list of the 10 biggest African tracks of 2016. The music video for "Dance for Me" was directed by Vertex and Gabriella Kingsley. Robin Murray of Clash magazine described the song as a "salute to their joint Ghanaian heritage". On 17 June 2016, Mr Eazi released the R&B-inspired "Anointing", a song that features rap verses from Ghanaian rapper Sarkodie. He first announced plans for the song in May 2016.

=== 2016–2017: GMA snub, Twitter backlash, Accra to Lagos, and record deal ===
In February 2016, organizers of the Ghana Music Awards made a decision not to nominate Mr Eazi in any of its Ghanaian-only categories. Charterhouse spokesperson George Quaye said Mr Eazi was disqualified because of his nationality and only eligible to compete in the African Artiste of the Year category. However, the singer failed to pick up a nomination in that particular category because the organizers felt he wasn't as big as the other nominees. On 11 January 2017, Mr Eazi tweeted that Ghanaian music has a great influence over present-day Nigerian music. He received heavy backlash after posting the tweet and trended nationwide in both Ghana and Nigeria. On 12 January 2017, Mr Eazi apologized to Nigerians for the comments he made.

Following his performance at the 2016 Ghana Music Awards, Wizkid announced that he signed Mr Eazi to his imprint Starboy Entertainment. However, the singer told Star FM Ghana that he is not officially signed to Starboy and is only in business with the imprint. Mr Eazi's second mixtape, Life Is Eazi, Vol. 1 – Accra To Lagos, was released on 10 February 2017. The mixtape was initially scheduled for release on 11 February 2017, and debuted at number 4 on the Billboard World Albums chart. The mixtape comprises 14 tracks, including three bonus tracks. Its production was handled by Maleek Berry, Masterkraft, Legendury Beatz, and Young John. Guest artists featured on the mixtape include Tekno, Olamide, Phyno, Mugeez, Medikal, DJ Cuppy, Falz, and Big Lean. Mr Eazi announced on Instagram that the mixtape sold 200,000 copies in pre-orders. While speaking to Julie Adenuga on her Beats 1 radio show, he said the mixtape is a tribute to the two cities that influenced the evolution of his sound.

The mixtape's lead single, "Leg Over", was produced by E-Kelly and released on 2 December 2016. The music video for "Leg Over" features cameo appearances from comedian Eddie Kadi, Maleek Berry, and Wizkid. Mr Eazi told Lawrence Burney from Noisey.com that the song is about being taken advantage of in a relationship. He also said it was leaked and wasn't meant to be a single. Upon its release in December 2016, "Leg Over" inspired numerous dance videos. Music in Africa's contributor Gabriel Myers Hansen described the song as "gentle and minimalist", and said it is "freshened by delicate string and percussion placements reminiscent of highlife from decades ago". Mr Eazi released the mixtape's second single, "Tilapia", on 1 February 2017. It features a rap verse by Ghanaian rapper Medikal. On 1 March 2017, Mr Eazi released the Sesan-directed music video for "In The Morning", which features vocals by Toronto rapper Big Lean. On 1 April 2017, he released the Teekay-directed music video for "Fight", a song that features additional vocals from DJ Cuppy. On 7 April 2017, Mr Eazi released the music video for the Mugeez-assisted track "Business".

=== 2019-present: Coachella, Empawa Africa, and The Evil Genius ===
In January 2019, Vanguard newspaper reported that Mr Eazi would perform at the 2019 Coachella Valley Music and Arts Festival. In August 2019, the singer launched emPawa Africa, a talent incubation initiative designed to nurture and support up-and-coming African artists. Thirty musicians were enrolled in the first edition and received grant and mentorship to scale up their music career. The initiative was supported by YouTube Music.

Mr Eazi released his second Extended Play (EP), Something Else, on 19 February 2021. On 10 June 2022, he released the single "Legalize" via his platform emPawa Africa. Mr Eazi released his debut studio album, The Evil Genius, on 27 October 2023.

== Artistry ==
Mr Eazi is known for pioneering Banku music, a sound "characterized by percolating rhythms and laid-back vocal delivered in Ghanaian Pidgin English". His music largely fits into the category of Afrobeats, a contemporary West African pop genre that marries pop, dancehall, highlife, and hip-hop. Music critics have described his music as having an R&B-like quality reminiscent of artists such as Beres Hammond and Gregory Isaacs. Noisey's Lawrence Burney stated that Mr Eazi uses his deep voice to "give ballad-like qualities to dance-forward production".

== Personal life ==
Mr Eazi is married to Temi Otedola, daughter of Nigerian billionaire Femi Otedola and sister to DJ Cuppy. They got engaged on 10 April 2022 and married in 2025. A civil ceremony was held in Monaco on 9 May, a traditional Yoruba wedding in Dubai in July, and a church wedding in Reykjavík.

== Discography ==
Studio albums

- The Evil Genius (2023)

EPs

- One Day You Will Understand (2020)
- Something Else (2021)
- Maison Rouge (2025)

Mixtapes

- About to Blow (2013)
- Life Is Eazi, Vol. 1 – Accra to Lagos (2017)
- Life Is Eazi, Vol. 2 – Lagos to London (2018)

=== Singles ===
==== As lead artist ====
List of singles, with year released, selected chart positions and certifications
Title	Year	Peak chart positions						Certifications	Album
Title	Year	UK	UK Afr	IRE	SCO	US Dance	WW	Certifications	Album
"Pipi Dance"	2012	—	×	—	—	—	—		About to Blow
"Bankulize"	2013	—	×	—	—	—	—		About to Blow
"Skin Tight" (featuring Efya)	2015	—	×	—	—	—	—		Non-album single
"Leg Over"	2016	—	×	—	—	—	4	BPI: Silver	Life Is Eazi, Vol. 1 – Accra to Lagos
"Skin Tight" (UK Remix) (featuring Stefflon Don and Haile)	2017	—	×	—	—	—	—	BPI: Silver	Non-album single
"Bad Vibe" (with M.O and Lotto Boyzz)	2018	18	×	31	41	—	—	BPI: Platinum	Modus Operandi
"Oh My Gawd" (with Major Lazer featuring Nicki Minaj and K4mo)	2020	—	—	—	—	11	1		Music Is the Weapon
"Lento" (with J Balvin)	2020	—	15	—	×	—	—		Non-album singles
"Falling for U" (with Blaq Jerzee and Harmonize)	2021	—	17	—	×	—	—		Non-album singles
"Breakup Riddim" (with DJ Aroma and Nhlanhla Nciza)	2021	—	19	—	×	—	—		Non-album singles
"I Wanna Run Away" (with R3hab and Wafia)	2021	—	—	—	×	37	—		Non-album singles
"Walangolo" (with DJ Neptune and Konshens)	2022	—	19	—	×	—	—		Non-album singles
"Legalize"	2022	—	13	—	×	—	—		The Evil Genius
"Personal Baby"	2022	—	18	—	×	—	—		Non-album single
"Patek" (feat. Joeboy & DJ Tarico)	2022	—	—	—	×	—	—		Chop Life, Vol. 1: Mzansi Chronicles
"Patek (remix)" (feat. Joeboy, DJ Tarico, Falz, & Major League Djz)	2022	—	—	—	×	—	—		Non-album single
"Chop Time, No Friend"	2023	—	—	—	×	—	—		The Evil Genius
"Advice"	2023	—	—	—	×	—	—		The Evil Genius
"Fefe Ne Fefe"	2023	—	—	—	×	—	—		The Evil Genius
"Exit" (feat. Soweto Gospel Choir)	2023	—	—	—	×	—	—		The Evil Genius
"Panadol (Radio Edit)"	2023	—	—	—	×	—	—		Non-album single
"For My Head" (feat. Mugeez & D Jay)	2024	—	—	—	×	—	—		TBA
"Love Me Now"	2025	—	—	—	×	—	—		TBA
"Attention (From F1® The Movie)"	2025	—	—	—	×	—	—		F1 the Album
"Corny"	2025	—	—	—	×	—	—		TBA
"Casanova"	2025	—	—	—	×	—	—		TBA
"—" denotes a recording that did not chart or was not released in that territory. "×" denotes that the chart did not exist at the time.

==== As featured artist ====
List of singles, with year released, selected chart positions and certifications
Title	Year	Peak chart positions								Certifications	Album
Title	Year	UK	UK Afr	BEL (Fl)	FRA	IRE	SCO	US Dance	WW	Certifications	Album
"Money" (Riton featuring Kah-Lo, Mr Eazi and Davido)	2017	—	×	22	—	—	—	—	—		Foreign Ororo
"All Night" (Yungen featuring Mr Eazi)	2017	98	×	—	—	—	—	—	—		Non-album single
"Decline" (Raye featuring Mr Eazi)	2017	15	×	—	—	29	38	—	—	BPI: Platinum	Side Tape
"Bad" (Steel Banglez featuring Yungen, MoStack, Mr Eazi and Not3s)	2017	29	×	—	—	—	—	—	—	BPI: Platinum	Non-album single
"Let Me Live" (Rudimental and Major Lazer featuring Anne-Marie and Mr Eazi	2018	42	×	16	173	43	29	20	—	BPI: Silver	Toast to Our Differences
"Tied Up" (Major Lazer featuring Mr Eazi, Raye and Jake Gosling)	2018	—	×	—	—	—	—	30	—		Major Lazer Essentials
"Nobody" (DJ Neptune featuring Joeboy and Mr Eazi)	2020	—	×	—	—	—	—	—	5		Greatness 2.0
"Abracadabra" (BOJ featuring Davido and Mr Eazi)	2020	—	11	—	—	—	—	—	—		Gbagada Express
"—" denotes a recording that did not chart or was not released in that territory. "×" denotes that the chart did not exist at the time.

=== Other charted and certified songs ===
List of songs, with year released, selected chart positions and certifications
Title	Year	Peak chart positions					Certifications	Album
Title	Year	UK Afr	FRA	SPA	US Latin	WW	Certifications	Album
"In The Morning" (featuring Big Lean)	2017	×	—	—	—	7		Life is Eazi, Vol. 1 – Accra To Lagos
"Miss You" (Still Fresh featuring Mr Eazi)	2018	×	175	—	—	—		Trapop
"Como Un Bebé" (J Balvin and Bad Bunny featuring Mr Eazi)	2019	×	—	55	13	—	RIAA: 5× Platinum (Latin)	Oasis
"Don't Jealous Me" (with Tekno, Lord Afrixana and Yemi Alade)	2019	×	—	—	—	12		The Lion King: The Gift
"Keys To The Kingdom" (with Tiwa Savage)	2019	×	—	—	—	16		The Lion King: The Gift
"Arcoíris" (with J Balvin)	2020	×	—	23	47	—	RIAA: Platinum (Latin)	Colores
"Baby I'm Jealous" (with emPawa Africa and King Promise)	2020	16	—	—	—	—		One Day You Will Understand
"E Be Mad"	2021	8	—	—	—	—		Something Else
"The Don"	2021	7	—	—	—	—		Something Else
"—" denotes a recording that did not chart or was not released in that territory. "×" denotes that the chart did not exist at the time.

== Awards and nominations ==
Year	Event	Prize	Recipient	Result	Ref
2018	The Headies	Hip Hop World Revelation of the Year	Himself	Nominated	
2017	MOBO Awards	Best African Act	Himself	Nominated	
2017	Nigeria Entertainment Awards	Afropop Male Artist	Himself	Nominated	
2016	WatsUp TV Africa Music Video Awards	Special Recognition Award Music Video Africa	"Skin Tight" (featuring Efya)	Won	
2016	Soundcity MVP Awards	Best New Artiste	Himself	Won	
2016	Soundcity MVP Awards	Song of the Year	"Hollup" (featuring Joey B and Dammy Krane)	Nominated	
2016	Soundcity MVP Awards	Viewers Choice	"Hollup" (featuring Joey B and Dammy Krane)	Nominated	
2016	Soundcity MVP Awards	Listeners Choice	"Skin Tight" (featuring Efya)	Nominated	
2016	The Headies	Next Rated	Himself	Won	
2016	MOBO Awards	Best African Act	Himself	Nominated	
2016	Nigeria Entertainment Awards	Most Promising Act to Watch	Himself	Won	
