= Denny White =

American politician

Dennis L. White of Columbus, Ohio, was the chairman of the Ohio Democratic Party, 2002–2005. He was chairman of the Ohio delegation to the 2004 Democratic National Convention in Boston, where he urged members of his delegation not to cross picket lines in the event of a labor dispute between Boston's Mayor and its police union. This led several delegates to complain that they were being "forced to take a side without knowing all the facts".

White resigned as chairman of Ohio Democratic Party on November 26, 2005. He is currently a member of the Democratic National Committee.
