= Stéphanie Villedrouin =

Haitian politician (born 1982)

Stéphanie Balmir Villedrouin
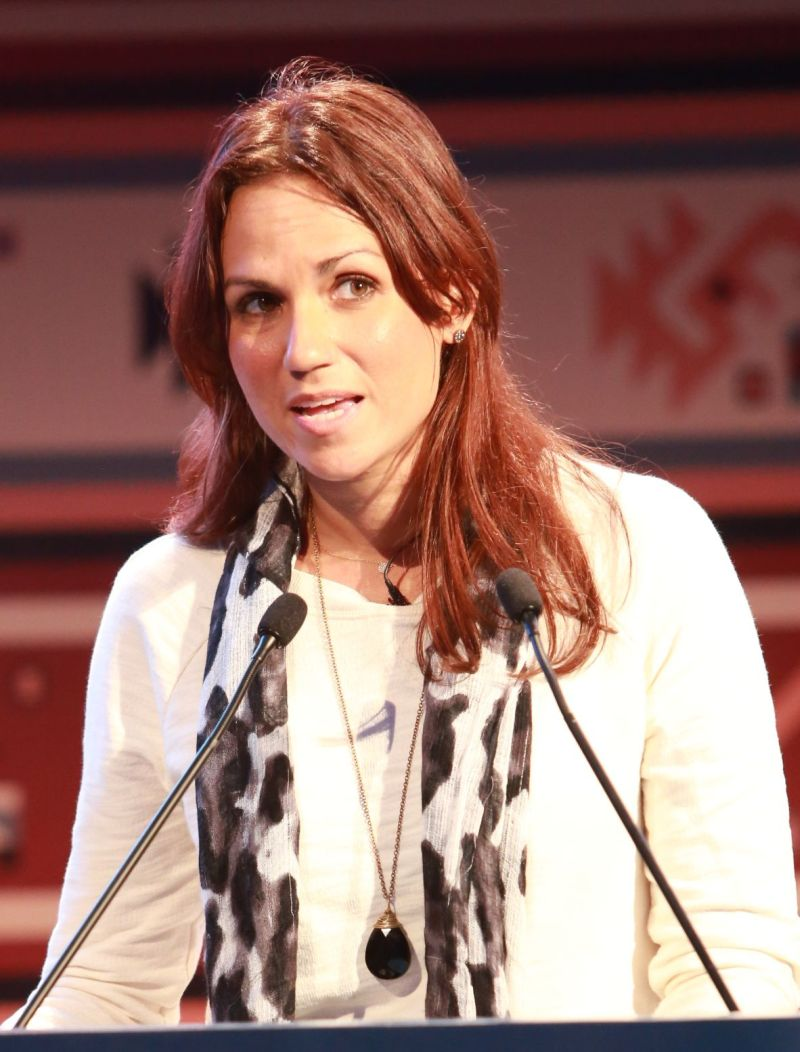

Ministry of Tourism and Creative Industries
- In office 2 April 2014 – 23 March 2016
- President: Michel Martelly
- Prime Minister: Laurent Lamothe; Florence Duperval Guillaume; Evans Paul
- Preceded by: Office created
- Succeeded by: Guy Didier Hyppolite

Ministry of Tourism
- In office 20 October 2011 – 2 April 2014
- President: Michel Martelly
- Prime Minister: Garry Conille; Laurent Lamothe; Florence Duperval Guillaume; Evans Paul

Personal details
- Born: 29 March 1982 (age 44) Caracas, Venezuela
- Spouse: Marcel Bernard Villedrouin
- Children: 3
- Parent(s): Alix Balmir (Father); Gladys du Bousquet (Mother)
- Education: Pontificia Universidad Católica Madre y Maestra

Stéphanie Balmir Villedrouin (French pronunciation: [stefani balmiʁ vildʁwɛ̃]; born 29 March 1982) is a Haitian entrepreneur who formerly served as the minister of tourism of Haiti.

== Early years ==
Villedrouin comes from a prominent Haitian family; the seventh child of Alix Balmir, a diplomat, and his wife, Gladys Dubousquet, a native of the city of Gonaïves, Haiti; both of her parents are mixed-race. She was born abroad in Caracas while her father was serving in diplomatic relations as the Ambassador of Haiti in Venezuela. Two months later her father was designated to the Haitian Embassy in Colombia, wherein Villedrouin spent her early childhood. After the fall of the Jean-Claude Duvalier’s regime, in 1986, the whole family returned to Haiti and established restaurants and hotels.

Villedrouin was four years old when her family returned to Haiti, where she completed her schooling in Port-au-Prince. Then, she studied hospitality and tourism management at the Pontificia Universidad Católica Madre y Maestra, in Santiago, Dominican Republic; she managed a hotel in Kenscoff, a mountainous hamlet located 10 kilometres to the southeast of Port-au-Prince. She is fluent in French and Haitian Creole, as well as in Spanish and English.

== Minister of Tourism ==
Her first term as the Minister of Tourism of Haiti was from 20 October 2011 to 2 April 2014. Rebranded as the Minister of Tourism and Creative Industries, Madame Villedrouin was re-confirmed to a second term on 2 April 2014 and served until 23 March 2016.

During her tenure, Haiti inaugurated its first Tourism Promotion Office.

== Personal life ==
In 2003, she married Marcel Bernard Villedrouin and they have three children together.
