= Halal Gang =

Canadian hip hop collective

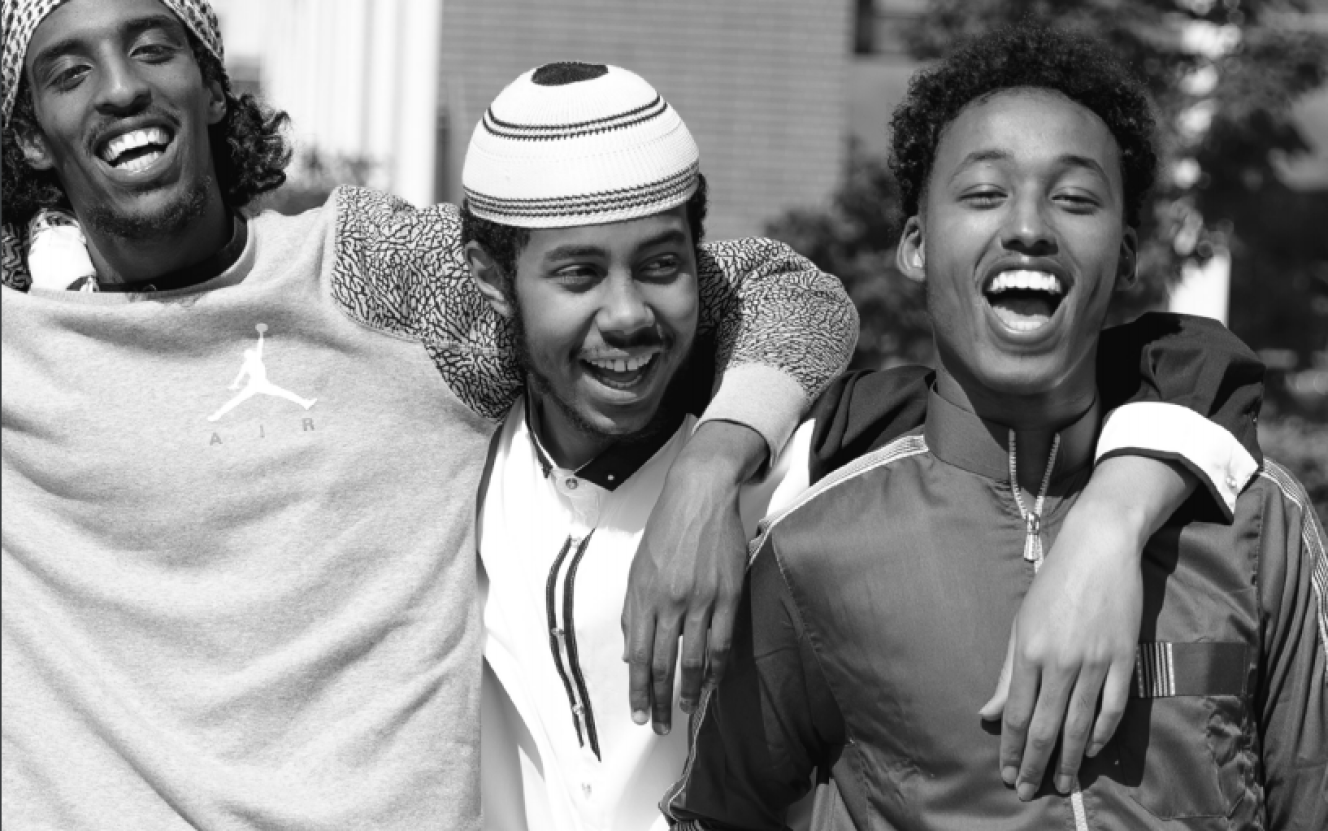
- Puffy L'z, Mustafa and Mo-G, 2015

Background information
- Origin: Toronto, Ontario, Canada
- Genres: Canadian hip hop
- Years active: 2010–present
- Members: Puffy L'z; Safe; Young Smoke; HG Paperboy; Mustafa the Poet
- Past members: Smoke Dawg (deceased); MO-G
- Website: halalgangmerch.bigcartel.com

Halal Gang is a Canadian hip hop collective based in Toronto, Ontario. The name stems from the preponderance of the group having Muslim origins with East African and Caribbean Canadian roots. Initially the group is said to have stemmed out from a gang participating in criminal activity. The group was established in 2010 as a group of youths from Regent Park inspired to make music. Its original incarnation includes Puffy L'z. Mustafa the Poet, Mo-G, Safe and Smoke Dawg.

== Background ==
=== 2010-2017 ===
Although initially the group is said to have stemmed out from a gang participating in criminal activity with the rivalry between Toronto gang Sick Thugz which ended with the passing of Sick Thugz member Ruck, Halal Gang branched out to making music in 2010. The rap group is notable for their identifying trademark exclamation, "AWOLAYY" as well as "SQUAAAD", which is primarily done by Puffy L'z. Halal Gang mostly shoots videos in bustling parts of Toronto's financial district, as well as other communities such as the Yorkville area to 'flex' on mans, given its highly-affluent and desirability to show off money.

Mustafa the Poet produces spoken word poetry from the group including the release Spectrum of Hope in September 2014. He was featured on CBC News in which he explores the connection between art and athletics in his Pan Am poem with Heather Hiscox. Halal Gang gained recognition in 2014 with the release of "Rabba" by members Mo-G and Smoke Dawg, released on October 4, 2014. It garnered over 1 million views within a month of release. This was two days before close friend Ano passed away. Mo-G and Smoke Dawg uploaded the song Still to YouTube in January 2015. In it, the two rappers and their friends rap, dance, and laugh in shadowy parking lots, fluorescent-lit apartment corridors, and an empty studio. Although the initial upload was deleted, it's reupload amassed over 4 million views within a year of being online.

Member Safe was born in Abu Dhabi but immigrated to Toronto as a child. He released the single Feel that differs heavily from the sound of his fellow crew members’ music and features members of Halal Gang on August 12, 2015. ASAP Ferg brought out Smoke Dawg in his 2016 tour in Toronto.

Puffy L'z and Smoke Dawg released a Fire In The Booth on March 14, 2017. The pair alongside Zahn, Mo, Siv. "TP" Nap, A "Pissy" P, Renshiz and Bandb performed 15 dates on Drake's Boy Meets World European Tour in the same year. This group would later become viral on the internet for their prank on the famous indigenous hip-hop dancer and rapper J. Rebel.

=== 2018-2020 ===
Puffy L'z, Mo-G and Safe returned to music in early 2019. In May 2019, Safe released his full-length album Stay. The 12 tracks were characterized by cool R&B with elements of dancehall and afrobeat. QUIN and Playboi Carti were the only featured artists. On his return, Puffy L'z released his debut album Take No L'z. which also featured Safe and the late Smoke Dawg. On 17 March 2019, Mustafa the Poet released the short film titled Remember Me, Toronto. The film featured numerous Toronto rappers including Drake, Baka Not Nice, Pressa, Jay Whiss, Puffy L’z amongst others and was scored by 40. Mustafa stated that he decided to work on the film after thinking about how his dead friends want to be remembered, after thinking about how we all want to be remembered. He created this for the artists in this video those in the Toronto community. Since 2018 after the passing off his older brother Smoke Dawg, Young Smoke began his music career rapping alongside the hip hop collective.

Mo-G released the single Perfect Dark on September 5, 2019. Him, Safe and Lz were featured on 6ixBuzz's compilation album Northern Sound released on December 13, 2019. Mustafa also began his solo music career in 2020 with the release of the single "Stay Alive".

=== 2021-present ===
Although it was rumoured that Mo-G had left the group a year prior, Puffy L'z and Mustafa confirmed this in separate interviews. Mustafa released his debut album When Smoke Rises in 2021, dedicated to former Halal Gang member Smoke Dawg who was murdered in 2018. The deluxe version of Smoke's album Struggle Before Glory was released in 2021. Mustafa's second solo album, Dunya, dropped in 2024.

== Death of Smoke Dawg ==
Canadian rapper Smoke Dawg was killed in a shooting in broad daylight in front of a Toronto night club on June 30, 2018. Mayor John Tory blamed the shooting on gun violence and as a result met with the 6ixBuzz team and Director X to meet with members of the hip-hop community to talk gun violence solutions and raise awareness on the issue.
