= Dunya (Mustafa album) =

Studio album by Mustafa
- Released: September 27, 2024
- Recorded: 2021–2024
- Genre: Folk
- Length: 40:50
- Language: English; Arabic
- Label: Arts & Crafts; Jagjaguwar
- Producer: Mustafa Ahmed; Simon Hessman; Aaron Dessner; Rodaidh McDonald; Dylan Wiggins; Rosalía; Nicolas Jaar; Fwdslxsh; Scum; Claire Cottrill

Mustafa chronology
When Smoke Rises (2021)	Dunya (2024)

Singles from Dunya
- 1. "Name of God" Released: October 17, 2023; 2. "Imaan" Released: March 5, 2024; 3. "Gaza Is Calling" Released: June 11, 2024; 4. "SNL" Released: July 11, 2024; 5. "Old Life" Released: August 27, 2024

Dunya (Arabic: دُنْيا, romanized: dunyā, lit. 'the world in all its flaws') is the debut studio album by Canadian folk singer Mustafa, released on September 27, 2024, through Arts & Crafts domestically and Jagjaguwar internationally. Collaborators on the album include Aaron Dessner, Daniel Caesar, Rosalía, Nicolás Jaar, JID, and Clairo. Most of the album's writing and production was done abroad, including in North Africa, and its songs incorporate traditional Arabic musical instruments such as the oud.

The album received widespread acclaim and appeared on a number of critics' year-end lists, as well as being short-listed for the 2025 Polaris Music Prize. It was supported by five singles: "Name of God", "Imaan", "Gaza Is Calling", "SNL", and "Old Life". The music video for "Name of God" won the 2024 Prism Prize, making Mustafa the first artist to win the award twice. Mustafa's first world tour, the Lost in the Dunya Tour, commenced in 2025, with stops in North America, Europe, and Africa.

In addition to the album's Polaris Prize nomination, Mustafa won the Polaris SOCAN Song Prize for "Gaza Is Calling".

== Background ==
Born in Toronto to Sudanese immigrants, Mustafa grew up in the Regent Park community housing project with a largely immigrant population. At twelve years old, his recital of his poem "A Single Rose" gained attention, which led to him performing it at the Canadian International Documentary Festival in 2009. As a teenager, Mustafa joined the hip hop collective Halal Gang under the moniker Mustafa the Poet. As a solo artist, Mustafa's debut EP, When Smoke Rises, explores grief from the death of Halal Gang member Smoke Dawg, and was released in 2021 to widespread acclaim. With influences from fellow Canadian folk singers Joni Mitchell, Neil Young and Leonard Cohen, the EP went on to win the Juno Award for Alternative Album of the Year and was shortlisted for the 2021 Polaris Music Prize. The music video for the track "Ali" won the Prism Prize, an award recognizing the best Canadian music video.

Mustafa has discussed feelings of bitterness towards Toronto, calling it a "hellhole" and describing a lack of connection due to the deaths of numerous friends and what he considers a lack of accountability regarding crime in the city. In late 2021, he played his first hometown show at Massey Hall, with the venue surrounded by heavy police presence. Since then, Mustafa decided to spend much of his time abroad, writing and recording in Sweden, the UK, and the US. The first songs for Dunya were written on a trip to Egypt with songwriting collaborator Simon Hessman; there, they searched for new influences, which they found in traditional Arabic musical instruments like the oud. Mustafa spent time at a jazz café in Cairo, where he met with local musicians to persuade them to record with him. He travelled to Sudan in 2022, where he visited his extended family, and he performed Umrah in early 2023. Mustafa's older brother Mohamed was fatally shot in downtown Toronto in July 2023, which further exacerbated his disillusionment toward Toronto.

Wanting to create a "traditional, minimalist folk album", Mustafa approached Aaron Dessner of the National and Big Red Machine, who invited him to Long Pond Studio in Hudson Valley, New York; Mustafa served as an opening act for the National at the Ottawa Folk Festival more than a decade prior. The two worked on songs for Dunya over the span of a week, enlisting help from DJ Dahi and Nicolás Jaar, and using field recordings to create an "electronic element that still felt organic".

== Artwork and release ==
The album cover depicts the application of kohl, a traditional Islamic practice done before people went to war; Mustafa sought to represent both faith and violence, which he felt were two large themes on the album. Dunya was announced on July 11, 2024, accompanied by the release of the single "SNL". The album was released on September 27, 2024, through Arts & Crafts Productions in Canada and Jagjaguwar abroad. The Japanese edition of the album on vinyl was sold through Big Love Records and includes a limited edition obi and a signed print.

== Promotion ==
External videos
- Music video for "Name of God", winner of the 2024 Prism Prize.

Five singles were released from the album. Opening track "Name of God", about Mustafa's relationship with Islam, was released on October 17, 2023. Its self-directed music video won the Prism Prize in 2024, making Mustafa the first artist to win the award twice. Featuring members of Mustafa's family, the video is a tribute to his brother and showcases traditional Sudanese clothing, dances, and rituals. "Imaan", released on March 5, 2024, is "a love song between two people in search of God and purpose". Its music video stars model Imaan Hammam and was directed by Mustafa and Nabil Elderkin, while Ramy Youssef served as creative director.

"Gaza Is Calling", written in 2020 about Mustafa's childhood friendship with a Palestinian boy, was released as the third single on June 11, 2024, with proceeds benefitting the Palestine Children's Relief Fund. Its music video, directed by Hiam Abbass, stars Palestinian American model Bella Hadid and Gazan rapper MC Abdul. It was mostly filmed in April 2023 but also includes footage from Jenin, Palestine, from June 2024 during the Gaza war. The fourth single "SNL" (an acronym for "Street N— Lullaby") and its self-directed music video were released on July 11, 2024, the same day as the album was announced. "Old Life" was released as the album's fifth and final single on August 27, 2024, with a music video directed by Tanima Mehrotra. A music video for the Daniel Caesar collaboration "Leaving Toronto" was released on October 8, 2024.

To promote the album, Mustafa played a Lost in the Dunya show at the Roy Thomson Hall in Toronto on November 7, 2024. In December 2024, Mustafa announced the Lost in the Dunya Tour, with dates in the first half of 2025. The concert tour has shows in the US and Canada in February, followed by shows in England, France, the Netherlands, Belgium, Germany, Denmark, Sweden, Ethiopia, and Sudan in May. To coincide with the tour's announcement, Mustafa released a live performance video of "What Good Is a Heart?", "Leaving Toronto" (with Caesar), and "I'll Go Anywhere", featuring Kibrom Birhane on masenqo and krar.

== Critical reception ==
Professional ratings
Aggregate scores
Source	Rating
AnyDecentMusic?	7.5/10
Metacritic	81/100
Review scores
Source	Rating
Clash	8/10
The Daily Telegraph	4/5 stars
Exclaim!	9/10
Focus Knack	4/5 stars
Gaffa	5/6 stars
The Guardian	3/5 stars
Pitchfork	8.0/10
Rolling Stone	4/5 stars
Slant Magazine	4/5 stars

Dunya received widespread acclaim from critics, and appeared on a number of year-end lists; Billboard Canada called it "one of the most acclaimed albums of 2024". According to the review aggregator Metacritic, Dunya received "universal acclaim" based on a weighted average score of 81 out of 100 from seven critic scores. Critics praised the blend of traditional Arabic musical instruments and modern Western sounds, as well as Mustafa's vocal versatility. Paul Attard of Slant Magazine called the album "a stunning work of autobiographical reflection", while Jen Long of The Line of Best Fit complimented its "timeless soul and sweeping heart". Kelsey Adams of CBC Music said "Dunya sounds both nostalgic and fresh, a new take on a well-trodden genre". Annabel Martin of The Daily Telegraph complimented Mustafa on "finding beauty in the ugly" and "[carving] out his own section within folk." Jonathan Bernstein of Rolling Stone praised the "rich melody and understated hooks" of Dunya, calling it "a gorgeous treatise on rage and faith". In a three-star review, Alexis Petridis of The Guardian felt that the album's "songs are well written and melodically strong" but that "they start to blur into one" due to their slow and melancholy nature. It was also selected as one of the 10 best Canadian albums comprising the 2025 Polaris Music Prize short-list.

Critics' year-end rankings of Dunya
Publication	List	Rank	Ref.
Associated Press	AP's top under-the-radar albums of 2024	—N/a	
CBC Music	The 15 best Canadian albums of 2024	1	
Dazed	The 20 best albums of 2024	6	
Exclaim!	50 Best Albums of 2024	4	
The Globe and Mail	The 10 best albums of 2024	—N/a	
Les Inrockuptibles	100 best albums of 2024	29	
The Line of Best Fit	The Best Albums of 2024	44	
The New York Times	Best Albums of 2024 (by Jon Caramanica)	—N/a	
The New York Times	Best Albums of 2024 (by Lindsay Zoladz)	—N/a	
NME	The 50 Best Albums of 2024	8	
NPR Music	The 50 Best Albums of 2024	—N/a	
Paste	The 100 Best Albums of 2024	30	
PopMatters	The 10 Best Folk Albums of 2024	2	
Rolling Stone	The 100 Best Albums of 2024	30	
Vulture	The Best Albums of 2024	5	

Critics' year-end rankings of songs from Dunya
Publication	List	Song	Rank	Ref.
Billboard Canada	The 25 Best Canadian Songs of 2024	"Gaza Is Calling"	—N/a	
CBC Music	The top 100 Canadian songs of 2023	"Name of God"	11	
CBC Music	The top 100 Canadian songs of 2024	"Imaan"	4	
Exclaim!	20 Best Songs of 2024	"Gaza Is Calling"	19	
The Fader	20 Best Songs of 2023	"Name of God"	88	
The New York Times	Best Songs of 2023 (by Jon Caramanica)	"Name of God"	4	
The New York Times	Best Songs of 2024 (by Jon Pareles)	"Old Life"	21	
Nialler9	The 100 best songs of 2023	"Name of God"	14	
NME	The 50 Best Songs of 2024	"SNL"	29	
Pitchfork	The 100 Best Songs of 2023	"Name of God"	70	
Pitchfork	The 100 Best Songs of 2024	"SNL"	62	
Time	The 10 Best Songs of 2024	"Leaving Toronto"	7	
Time Out	The 30 best songs of 2024	"What Good Is a Heart?"	5	

== Track listing ==
Dunya track listing
No.	Title	Writer(s)	Producer(s)	Length
1.	"Name of God"	Aaron Dessner; Mustafa Ahmed; Simon Hessman	Ahmed; Hessman; Dessner; Rodaidh McDonald	3:28
2.	"What Happened, Mohamed?"	Ahmed; Hessman	Ahmed; McDonald; Dylan Wiggins	3:11
3.	"Imaan"	Abdel Gadir Salim; Ahmed; McDonald; Hessman	Ahmed; Dessner; McDonald; Hessman; Wiggins	3:34
4.	"What Good Is a Heart?"	Ahmed; Hessman	Hessman; McDonald; Dessner	3:58
5.	"SNL"	Destin Route; Ahmed; McDonald; Hessman	Hessman; McDonald; Dessner	3:06
6.	"I'll Go Anywhere"	Ahmed; Hessman	Hessman; McDonald; Dessner; Rosalía; Nicolás Jaar; Wiggins	2:34
7.	"Beauty, End"	Ahmed; Hessman	Hessman; McDonald	2:50
8.	"Old Life"	Dacoury Dahi Natche; Ahmed; Hessman	Hessman; Dahi; McDonald	3:00
9.	"Gaza Is Calling"	Emmanuel Hailemariam; Ahmed; Jaar; Hessman	Hessman; McDonald; Jaar	4:30
10.	"Leaving Toronto" (with Daniel Caesar)	Jonah Yano; Ahmed; McDonald; Hessman	Hessman; McDonald; Dessner; Wiggins; Fwdslxsh; Scum	4:08
11.	"Hope Is a Knife"	Claire Cottrill; Ahmed	Cottrill; McDonald	2:35
12.	"Nouri"	Ahmed; Hessman; Tarek Elazhary	Hessman; Wiggins	3:52

Notes

- "Imaan" incorporates elements of "Nujum Al-lail", written and performed by Abdel Gadir Salim.

== Personnel ==
Instrumentation

- Mustafa – vocals (all tracks)
- Ben Reed – bass (tracks 1, 4, 10)
- Aaron Dessner – guitar (tracks 1, 3–5), piano (1, 4), synthesizer (1, 5), bass (5)
- Simon Hessman – guitar (tracks 1–8, 12), claps (2, 4), drums (2), percussion (2, 5, 7–9, 12), sampler (2–4, 6, 9), dulcimer (4), piano (5, 7, 9), bass (8), synthesizer (8)
- Kibrom Birhane – mesenko (track 1), strings (4, 7)
- Dylan Wiggins – sampler (track 2), claps (6)
- Rodaidh McDonald – bass (track 3)
- Samuel Kauffman-Skloff – drums (tracks 3, 10)
- Snoh Aalegra – background vocals (track 3)
- JID – background vocals (track 5)
- Puffy L'z – background vocals (track 5)
- Rosalía – background vocals (tracks 6, 12)
- DJ Dahi – background vocals (track 8), drums (8)
- Nicolás Jaar – programming (track 9), sound effects (9)
- Daniel Caesar – vocals (track 10)
- Clairo – background vocals (track 11), flute (11), keyboard (11)
- Tarek Elazhary – percussion (track 12)

Post-production

- Dale Becker – mastering (tracks 2–12)
- Katie Harvey – mastering (tracks 2–4, 6–8, 10–12)
- Nate Mingo – mastering (tracks 2–4, 6–8, 10–12)
- Noah McCorkle – mastering (tracks 2–4, 6–8, 10–12)
- Rodaidh McDonald – mixing (tracks 2–12)
- Bella Blasko – engineering (tracks 5–6)
