= Stay (Safe album) =

Studio album by Safe
- Released: May 9, 2019
- Recorded: 2018–2019
- Genre: Hip hop; Canadian hip hop; trap; R&B; dancehall; afrobeat
- Length: 38:19
- Label: RCA
- Producer: 1-900; 1Mind; C-Gutta; Charlie Handsome; Chester Hansen; Cvre; Digi; DJ Dahi; Doc McKinney; Dylan Wiggins; Jaasu; Mike & Keys; Mike Sonier; Pat Thrall; Pluss; Styalz Fuego; T-Minus; Zack Sekoff

Safe chronology
Stay Down (2015)	Stay (2019)

Singles from Stay
- 1. "Paid in Full" Released: April 5, 2019

Professional ratings
Review scores
Source	Rating
Exclaim!	7/10
HotNewHipHop	5/5

Stay is the debut studio album by Canadian singer and rapper Safe. It was released on May 9, 2019, by RCA Records. It features guest appearances from Playboi Carti and Quin.

== Background ==
The album features guest appearances from American rapper Playboi Carti and American singer Quin. It follows up from his 2015 debut mixtape Stay Down. The album comes after working with the likes of the late Smoke Dawg, Bibi Bourelly and Khalid for his second studio album Free Spirit.

== Critical reception ==
HotNewHipHop gave the album a 5-star rating, describing the project as one of his most experimental efforts to date in which he dabbles with elements of dancehall, R&B and afrobeats.

== Track listing ==
Credits adapted from Tidal.

No.	Title	Writer(s)	Producer(s)	Length
1.	"Old Wayz" (featuring Quin)	Saif Musaad; Bianca Quiñones; Jun Ha Kim	Cvre	2:43
2.	"No Rush"	Musaad; Dacoury Natche; Chester Hansen; Mustafa Ahmed	DJ Dahi; Hansen	2:56
3.	"On My Own"	Musaad; Darwin Quinn; Michael Cox, Jr.; John Groover, Jr.; Jocelyn Donald	C-Gutta; Mike & Keys	3:44
4.	"Control"	Musaad; Jamil Chammas; Kaelyn Behr; Justin Lucas; Kameron Glasper	Digi; Styalz Fuego	3:46
5.	"Red Light"	Musaad; Ahmed; Martin McKinney; Dylan Wiggins; Michael Sonier	Doc McKinney; Wiggins; Mike Sonier	2:46
6.	"Wasteland"	Musaad; Ahmed; Glasper; Devon Orr; Ruben Sosa, Jr.; Steven Carless	Dro; Citoonthebeat	3:56
7.	"Damaged"	Musaad; Tyler Williams	T-Minus	2:36
8.	"Summer's End 2"	Musaad; Ahmed; Glasper; Ha Kim; Ryan Vojtesak	Charlie Handsome; Cvre	3:04
9.	"Piano"	Musaad; Ahmed; Adam Pallin	1-900	3:19
10.	"Nobody Cares"	Musaad; Ahmed; Glasper; Ha Kim; Ryan Vojtesak	Charlie Handsome; Cvre	2:23
11.	"R U Scared, Pt. 2"	Musaad; Ahmed; Wiggins; Sebastian Lopez; Jaasu Mallory; Zack Sekoff	1Mind; Wiggins; Jaasu; Sekoff	3:44
12.	"Paid in Full" (featuring Playboi Carti) (bonus track)	Musaad; Jordan Carter; Ashton Hogan	Pluss	3:22
Total length:				38:19
