= Struggle Before Glory =

Studio album by Smoke Dawg
- Released: November 30, 2018
- Recorded: 2016–2018
- Genres: Canadian hip hop; trap
- Length: 33:00
- Producer: Murda Beatz

Professional ratings
Review scores
Source	Rating
Exclaim!	8/10
HNHH	5/5 stars

Struggle Before Glory is the lone studio album by Canadian rapper Smoke Dawg. The album received an 8/10 rating by Exclaim!.

== Background ==
Smoke Dawg announced that his debut studio album Struggle Before Glory is due to be released later in the year. However, before the album was officially released, he was shot and killed on June 30, 2018 in front of a nightclub in downtown Toronto. The lead single of the album "No Discussion" featured AJ Tracey and was produced by Murda Beatz. It was released a month after his death on August 13, 2018. Smoke Dawg's posthumous album Struggle Before Glory was released on November 29, 2018. The album features from the likes of Toronto artists Puffy L'z, Jimmy Prime, Jay Whiss and Safe, as well as UK artists Fredo, AJ Tracey and Giggs. Smoke Dawg's younger brother, Young Smoke, provided a tribute on the outro of the album.

== Critical reception ==
The album was rated 8/10 by Exclaim!. The album was described as a "sum up of the late rapper's legacy". Aron A. of HotNewHipHop described the album as a sum up of the legacy of one of the hottest rappers who was emerging from Toronto in the past few years.

== Track listing ==
1. "LLSD" – 2:01
2. "Automatic" – 3:28
3. "Three of a Kind" (featuring Fredo and Jay Critch) – 3:57
4. "Fountain" – 1:53
5. "Bricks" (featuring Giggs) – 3:03
6. "Snow" – 2:51
7. "No Discussion" (featuring AJ Tracey) – 3:01
8. "These Games" (featuring Jay Whiss and Safe) – 2:41
9. "SB4G Interlude" – 1:09
10. "YND" (featuring Safe and Jimmy Prime) – 4:13
11. "That's a Lot" (featuring Puffy L'z) – 2:44
12. "Dead to Me" – 3:22
13. "Smokey World (Bonus Track) Young Smoke" – 2:06
