= Smoke Dawg =

Canadian rapper (1996–2018)

Background information
- Born: Jahvante Jahqwane Sheldon Smart; November 18, 1996; Toronto, Ontario, Canada
- Died: June 30, 2018 (aged 21) Toronto, Ontario, Canada
- Genres: Hip hop; trap; Canadian hip hop
- Occupations: Rapper; singer; songwriter
- Years active: 2013–2018
- Formerly of: Halal Gang; Full Circle

Jahvante Jahqwane Sheldon Smart (November 18, 1996 – June 30, 2018), known professionally as Smoke Dawg, was a Canadian rapper from Toronto, Ontario. He was a part of hip hop collective Halal Gang alongside Mustafa the Poet, Puffy L'z, Safe, and Mo-G who come together with the Prime Boys to make the supergroup Full Circle. His debut and only studio album, Struggle Before Glory, was released posthumously in 2018.

== Career ==
=== Beginnings: 2012–2014 ===
Smart began rapping at the age of 16 in 2012. He gained recognition in 2014 with the release of "Still" featuring Halal Gang member MoG, on October 4, 2014. It gained over 1 million views within a month. Mo-G and Smoke Dawg re-uploaded the song "Still" to YouTube in January 2015. In the video, the two rappers and their friends rap, dance, and laugh in shadowy parking lots, fluorescent-lit apartment corridors, and an empty studio. Although the initial upload was deleted, its re-upload amassed over 4 million views within a year of being online.

=== "Trap House:" 2015–2016 ===
Smart released the single "Trap House" on July 31, 2016. The single introduced a dance move known as "flippin'" and gained the attention of artists including French Montana, who appeared on the official remix of the single, and Toronto artist Drake. Drake went on to include Smart in many of his worldwide tours and he also headlined alongside ASAP Ferg. Safe released the single "Hang" in 2015 which saw a feature from Smoke Dawg. Smart released the single "Overseas" alongside Skepta in October 2016. This was Skepta's second work with a Canadian artist, the first being Tre Mission. The single was produced by Toronto native Murda Beatz. Smart also performed at Toronto's first independent hip-hop festival outside of OVO's own offering, 6 Fest. The two-day festival saw Smoke Dawg performing alongside his Halal Gang as well as Pusha T, French Montana and Roy Woods.

=== Struggle Before Glory: 2017–2018 ===
Smart was named on Now's list of Toronto musicians to watch for in 2017. In February 2017, Smart released the song "Count it Up", having gone to London, UK to shoot the music video. He also headlined in London with supporting acts Nafe Smallz, Drake and Splurgeboys. Whilst in the UK, Smoke Dawg and Halal Gang affiliate Puffy L'z dropped a "Fire in the Booth" freestyle with Charlie Sloth in March 2017. He was also on the Boy Meets World Tour touring with Drake. During this month Smart also featured on Jimmy Prime's single "Humana" alongside Donnie. Toronto's most notorious music festival, uTOpia, was held during June 2017 and showcased the new generation of artists in the General Toronto Area. Smoke Dawg, one of the main performers of the festival, brought out Puffy L'z and Mo-G. The event was rated a 7 by Exclaim!, who described Prime Boys and Halal Gang's performance as playing off of each other's energy, which ultimately brought the night together.

In September 2017, Smart was featured in the documentary Northside, which highlighted Toronto's fledgling rap scene. Noisey released a short film titled Noisey Meets Smoke Dawg in December 2017. The behind-the-scenes documentary caught up with Smoke Dawg in Toronto where he talked about his rise, the passing of his best friend, and how to break through Toronto's glass ceiling.

Smart announced that he was working on his debut studio album, Struggle Before Glory, in early 2018. However, before it was released, he was shot and killed on June 30, 2018, in front of a nightclub in downtown Toronto. The lead single of the album, "No Discussion", featured AJ Tracey and was produced by Murda Beatz. It was released a month after his death on August 13, 2018. Smoke Dawg's posthumous debut and only studio album, Struggle Before Glory, was released on November 29, 2018. The album was rated 8/10 by Exclaim!. The album features from the likes of Toronto artists Puffy L'z, Jimmy Prime, Jay Whiss and Safe, as well as UK artists Fredo, AJ Tracey and Giggs. The album was described as a "sum up of the late rapper's legacy". Smoke Dawg's younger brother, Young Smoke, provided a tribute on the outro of the album.

=== Posthumous appearances and legacy: 2019–present ===
Halal Gang affiliate Mustafa the Poet released a short film titled Remember Me, Toronto. The film discusses gun and gang violence, and features over a dozen Toronto-based hip-hop artists. Smart was featured in archive footage of his speech on how he wishes to be remembered. Smart appeared on Puffy L'z' debut album Take No L'z, released on July 19, 2019, on the single "Boring" alongside Jay Whiss. He was also featured on Donnie's debut album From the Beginning to End, released on November 22, 2019, on the track "Good as it Gets" alongside Jimmy Prime.

Jay Whiss released the single "Mind in a Maze", the lead single for his debut album Peace of Mind. The song was a tribute to Smoke Dawg, and Whiss has stated that it was his favorite song he ever recorded. Smart was known for his ad-lib "Awhoolay"; in an interview with Now newspaper, Puffy L'z stated he uses the ad-lib to keep Smart's name alive.

Mustafa the Poet dedicated his 2021 debut album When Smoke Rises to Smoke Dawg, who is also featured on the cover art.

== Death ==
On June 30, 2018, Smart was killed in a shooting during broad daylight in front of a downtown nightclub in the Toronto Entertainment District near the corner of Queen Street West and Spadina Avenue. The perpetrators allegedly shot multiple times and fled in a black SUV with tinted windows. Three victims, including Smoke Dawg, were injured. Two were later pronounced dead in hospital. Affiliates of Smoke Dawg posted on social media that Smoke Dawg and 28-year-old Prime Boys manager Koba Prime (birth name Ernest "Kosi" Modekwe) were killed in the shooting, with the Toronto Police Service confirming this the following day. Mayor John Tory blamed the shooting on gun violence, and as a result met with the 6ixBuzz team and Director X to meet with members of the hip-hop community to talk gun violence solutions and raise awareness on the issue.

Abdulkadir Handule, known by the stage name "21Neat", pleaded not guilty to two counts of first-degree murder, but was convicted of two counts of second-degree murder by an Ontario Superior Court jury in February 2022. Handule is currently serving a life sentence.

== Discography ==
=== Studio albums ===
- 2018: Struggle Before Glory

=== Songs ===
As lead artist

List of singles as lead artist
Title	Year	Album
"Still" (with Mo-G)	2015	non-album singles
"Trap House"	2015	non-album singles
"Flippin'"	2015	non-album singles
"OT and Back" (featuring Ruck)	2016	non-album singles
"Overseas" (featuring Skepta)	2016	non-album singles
"Count It Up"	2017	non-album singles
"Pop A Perc"	2017	non-album singles
"No Discussion" (featuring AJ Tracey)	2017	Struggle Before Glory
"Happen" (featuring Pressa)	2017	non-album singles
"Snow"		non-album singles
"Fountain Freestyle"	2018	non-album singles

As featured artist

List of singles as featured artist
Title	Year	Album
"Income" (with Full Circle)	2016	non-album singles
"El Chapo" (with Full Circle)	2016	non-album singles
"Full Circle" (with Full Circle)	2016	non-album singles
"Time Flies" (Jay Whiss featuring Jimmy Prime & Smoke Dawg)	2016	non-album singles
"Hunnids" (Murda Beatz featuring Smoke Dawg)	2016	Keep God First
"Humana" (Jimmy Prime featuring Donnie & Smoke Dawg)	2017	non-album single

== Filmography ==
Film and television
Year	Title	Role	Notes
2019	Remember Me, Toronto	Himself	Archive footage. Short film by Mustafa the Poet which pays a special tribute to Smoke Dawg
