= Never Enough (Daniel Caesar album) =

2023 album by Daniel Caesar

Studio album by Daniel Caesar
- Released: April 7, 2023
- Recorded: 2021–2023
- Genre: R&B
- Length: 54:32
- Label: Republic
- Producers: Ace G; BadBadNotGood; Matthew Burnett; Daniel Caesar; Cyeux; Jordan Evans; Chris Jennings; Rami; Mark Ronson; Sacha Rudy; Raphael Saadiq; Sir Dylan; Sir Nolan; Zachary Simmonds; Simon on the Moon; Sevn Thomas

Daniel Caesar chronology
Case Study 01 (2019)	Never Enough (2023)	Son of Spergy (2025)

Singles from Never Enough
- 1. "Do You Like Me?" Released: January 27, 2023; 2. "Let Me Go" Released: February 10, 2023; 3. "Valentina" Released: March 31, 2023; 4. "Unstoppable" Released: April 4, 2023

Professional ratings
Aggregate scores
Source	Rating
Metacritic	72/100
Review scores
Source	Rating
AllMusic	3/5 stars
Clash	8/10
HipHopDX	3.6/5 stars
Exclaim!	9/10
Pitchfork	6.6/10

Never Enough (stylized in all caps) is the third studio album by Canadian singer-songwriter Daniel Caesar. It was released through Republic on April 7, 2023, two days after his 28th birthday. Production was handled by Caesar himself, Zachary Simmonds (his younger brother), Sir Dylan, Sevn Thomas, Rami, and Raphael Saadiq.

== Background and recording ==
On February 8, 2022, in an interview with Complex Canada of his home country, Caesar said that he recorded the album mostly by himself after quarantine for the COVID-19 pandemic. Three days later, in an interview with Hypebeast, he stated that he was tapping into different influences aside from his traditional style of R&B music for his next album. On April 12, 2022, it was announced that Caesar had signed with Republic Records and he was interviewed by Billboard, in which he shared that the album would be less focused on R&B and include influences that he was earlier inspired by, such as folk and country music. On March 21, 2023, Caesar announced the title of its album and shared its cover art, tracklist, and release date.

=== Singles and promotion ===
The lead single of the album, "Do You Like Me?", was released on January 27, 2023. The second single, "Let Me Go", was released on February 10, 2023. On February 28, 2023, Caesar announced the title of the album via now-deleted social media posts. On March 21, 2023, he shared its release date, cover art, and tracklist. On March 31, 2023, the third single, "Valentina", was released. On April 4, 2023, he released "Unstoppable", the fourth and final single before the album.

== Critical reception ==
According to the review aggregator Metacritic, Never Enough received "" based on a weighted average score of 72% out of 100 from 5 critic scores.

Ben Okazawa of Exclaim! concludes his review by describing the album as "a cohesive display of genre experimentation that cements Caesar's place as one of the smartest and most talented artists in today's constantly mutating R&B pantheon." Andy Kellman's review for AllMusic described the album as "open, messy, and fascinating." Clash's Grace Dodd called the album "a warm, intimate masterclass in contemporary R&B." Heven Haile of Pitchfork described the album as "sleepy [and] erratically experimental." Writing for HipHopDX, Louis Pavlakos concludes by stating that the album "marks a redemption arc for a flawed man with equally flawed views to make a case at proving he's matured."

The album was shortlisted for the 2023 Polaris Music Prize, and won the Juno Award for Contemporary R&B/Soul Recording of the Year at the Juno Awards of 2024.

== Track listing ==
No.	Title	Writer(s)	Producer(s)	Length
1.	"Ocho Rios"	Ashton Simmonds	Daniel Caesar; Jordan Evans; Matthew Burnett; Sir Dylan; BadBadNotGood	2:33
2.	"Valentina"	A. Simmonds; Zachary Simmonds; Dylan Wiggins	Simmonds; Sir Dylan	2:34
3.	"Toronto 2014" (with Mustafa)	A. Simmonds; Mustafa Ahmed	Caesar; Sir Dylan; Simon on the Moon	4:37
4.	"Let Me Go"	A. Simmonds; James Napier; Rami Yacoub; Rupert Thomas, Jr.	Caesar; Sevn Thomas; Rami	3:36
5.	"Do You Like Me?"	A. Simmonds; Raphael Saadiq; Wiggins	Caesar; Sir Dylan; Saadiq	3:37
6.	"Always"	A. Simmonds; Justin Lucas; Nolan Lambroza; Tobias Jesso Jr.	Sir Nolan	3:45
7.	"Cool"	A. Simmonds; Sacha Rudy	Caesar; Burnett; Evans; Rudy	4:04
8.	"Disillusioned" (with serpentwithfeet)	A. Simmonds; Josiah Wise	Sir Dylan	4:01
9.	"Buyers Remorse" (featuring Omar Apollo)	A. Simmonds; Omar Velasco; Sean Leon	Caesar; Sir Dylan	2:32
10.	"Shot My Baby"	A. Simmonds; Ahmed	Sir Dylan	4:28
11.	"Pain Is Inevitable"	A. Simmonds	Caesar; Sir Dylan; Mark Ronson	4:55
12.	"Homiesexual" (with Ty Dolla Sign)	A. Simmonds; Tyrone Griffin, Jr.	Caesar; Simmonds; Burnett; Evans; Sir Dylan	3:50
13.	"Vince Van Gogh"	A. Simmonds	Caesar; Sir Dylan; Cyeux	2:45
14.	"Superpowers"	A. Simmonds; Joel Compass	Caesar; Burnett; Evans; Sir Dylan	2:54
15.	"Unstoppable"	A. Simmonds; Chester Hansen; Alexander Sowinski; Leland Whitty; Burnett; Evans; Jamar McNaughton	Caesar; Sir Dylan; Chris Jennings	4:07
Total length:				54:32

Bonus version tracks
No.	Title	Writer(s)	Producer(s)	Length
16.	"Please Do Not Lean" (featuring BadBadNotGood)	A. Simmonds; Burnett; Evans; Hansen; Sowinski; Whitty; Alexander Ernwein	Evans; BadBadNotGood; Ace G	4:00
17.	"Always" (featuring Summer Walker)	A. Simmonds; Lucas; Lambroza; Jesso Jr.	Sir Dylan	3:42
18.	"Valentina" (featuring Rick Ross)	A. Simmonds; Z. Simmonds	Simmonds; Sir Dylan	3:56
Total length:				66:10

Notes

- ^{^[a]} signifies a co-producer
- ^{^[b]} signifies an uncredited co-producer

== Personnel ==
Production and music

- Daniel Caesar – vocals (1–15); bass (3, 4, 6, 8, 10–15); guitar (3, 4, 8, 10, 12–15); synth bass (3, 6, 8, 10); synthesizer programming (4, 10, 12–15); drums (11, 12, 14, 15)
- Axel Benamar – programming (13)
- BadBadNotGood
  - Chester Hansen – bass (1)
  - Alexander Sowinski – drums (1)
  - Leland Whitty – guitar, synth bass (1)
- Chronixx – vocals (15)
- Daniel Migdal – strings (7, 11)
- DannyBoyStyles – guitar (6)
- Dylan Wiggins – programming (1, 2, 3, 8, 10–15); synthesizer programming (5)
- Emile Haynie – drum programming (11)
- Joel Compass – programming (14)
- Jordan Evans – programming (12)
- Justin Lucas – guitar (6)
- Justine Skye – background vocals (10)
- Mark Ronson – programming (11)
- Matthew Burnett – bass (7); drums, programming, synthesizer programming (12)
- Rami Yacoub – programming (4)
- Sabrina Claudio – background vocals (15)
- Serpentwithfeet – background vocals (8)
- Sevn Thomas – drum programming (4)
- Simon Hessman – guitar (3)
- Sir Nolan – programming, guitar, synth bass (6)
- Zachary Simmonds – programming (2)

Technical

- Dylan Wiggins – engineer (2, 10)
- Félix Remy – engineer (7)
- Jake Ferguson – engineer (11)
- Jens Jungkurth – engineer (11)
- Migui Maloles – engineer (1, 2, 3, 8, 10, 11, 15)
- Riley Bell – engineer (7, 14)
- Sir Nolan – engineer (6)
- Tom Elmhirst – mixer (1–15); engineer (12)

== Charts ==
=== Weekly charts ===
Weekly chart performance for Never Enough
Chart (2023)	Peak position
Australian Albums (ARIA)	43
Belgian Albums (Ultratop Flanders)	193
Belgian Albums (Ultratop Wallonia)	173
Canadian Albums (Billboard)	8
French Albums (SNEP)	119
New Zealand Albums (RMNZ)	15
Scottish Albums (Official Charts)	83
UK Albums (Official Charts)	60
UK R&B Albums (Official Charts)	4
US Billboard 200	14
US Top R&B/Hip-Hop Albums (Billboard)	6

=== Year-end charts ===
Year-end chart performance for Never Enough
Chart (2023)	Position
US Top R&B/Hip-Hop Albums (Billboard)	95

== Certifications ==
Certifications for Never Enough
Region	Certification	Certified units/sales
Canada (Music Canada)	Gold	40,000^{‡}
New Zealand (RMNZ)	Platinum	15,000^{‡}
United Kingdom (BPI)	Silver	60,000^{‡}
United States (RIAA)	Gold	500,000^{‡}
^{‡} Sales+streaming figures based on certification alone.
