= Take No L'z =

Studio album by Puffy L'z
- Released: July 19, 2019
- Recorded: 2018–2019
- Genre: Hip hop; trap
- Length: 33:00
- Producer: Murda Beatz; Malik Ninety Five

Singles from Take No L'z
- 1. "Front Gate (featuring Giggs)" Released: June 14, 2019

Professional ratings
Review scores
Source	Rating
Exclaim!	6/10

Take No L'z is the debut studio album by Canadian rapper Puffy L'z. It was released on July 19, 2019, and received a 6/10 rating from Exclaim!.

== Background ==
Puffy L'z returned to music in early 2019. On his return he has released the single Front Gate featuring British rapper Giggs. He released his debut studio album Take No L'z on July 19, 2019, featured guest appearances from Safe, Jay Whiss, Giggs and Smoke Dawg. He also went on to feature on Jay Whiss's debut album Peace of Mind with the single "Valet" produced by Murda Beatz released on December 4, 2019.

== Track listing ==
Track listing adapted from KKBox.

1. "Take No L'z" – 02:33
2. "Boring" (featuring Smoke Dawg and Jay Whiss) – 03:49
3. "This Is For" – 02:32
4. "Do For Clout (Skit)" – 01:44
5. "Front Gate" (featuring Giggs) – 02:58
6. "Best of Me" – 02:36
7. "PLL" – 03:12
8. "Big Timer" (featuring SAFE) – 03:42
9. "Abti Jama (Skit)" – 01:56
10. "Hey Mama" – 02:34
11. "Hard Times" – 03:34
12. "Letter To My Akhs" – 03:31
13. "Regent State of Mind" – 02:10
