= Caviar Dreams =

EP by NorthSideBenji
- Released: January 18, 2019
- Recorded: 2017–19
- Genre: Hip hop
- Length: 24:38
- Label: Self-released
- Producer: BricksDaMane; Danberry; EG; Ravaillac; Tahj Money

NorthSideBenji chronology
Caviar Dreams (2019)	Frienemy (2019)

Singles from Caviar Dreams
- 1. "Confessions" Released: December 12, 2017; 2. "Levels" Released: January 26, 2019

Caviar Dreams is the debut extended play by Toronto rapper NorthSideBenji. Although the album was due to be released in July 2018, it was officially released on January 18, 2019. The album was supported by the singles "Confessions", and "Levels". It included production from producers Bricks Da Mane and Dan Berry among others.

== Critical reception ==
Professional ratings
Review scores
Source	Rating
Exclaim!	4/5 stars

Exclaim! gave the album a 8/10, stating that the album speaks to the determination of getting out of their current circumstances and living a life they may never have been able to dream of – a life where the term Caviar Dreams is no longer considered just an album title, but a reality worth living.

== Notes ==
The song "Winner" was remixed by Play Dirty producer Bouncer which featured NorthSideBenji and Chip and was released on October 10, 2019.

The single "Levels" was certified gold by Music Canada on April 7, 2020.

== Track listing ==
Credits adapted from Genius.

Standard edition
No.	Title	Writer(s)	Producer(s)	Length
1.	"Intro"	Jaiden Watson		3:19
2.	"Winner"	Watson		3:29
3.	"Confessions"	Watson	EG	2:58
4.	"Organization"	Watson		3:33
5.	"Back on Road"	Watson	BricksDaMane	2:40
6.	"FreeStyle"	Watson	Ravaillac; BricksDaMane	2:38
7.	"Facts"	Watson	Tahj Money	3:22
8.	"Levels (featuring Houdini)"	Watson; Dimarjio Jenkins	Danberry	2:34
Total length:				24:37
