= Levels (NorthSideBenji song) =

Single by NorthSideBenji featuring Houdini
- Released: 25 January 2019
- Studio: The Galeri
- Genre: Canadian hip hop
- Label: Music 4 Life
- Songwriters: NorthSideBenji, Houdini
- Producer: DanberryBeatz

NorthSideBenji singles chronology
"Confessions" (2017)	"Levels" (2019)	"Frienemy" (2019)

Music video
- "Levels" on YouTube

"Levels" is a song by Canadian rapper NorthSideBenji, featuring fellow Canadian rapper Houdini. It was released as a single on January 25, 2019. in which it speaks of the heart of getting out of their current circumstances and living a life of "Caviar Dreams". It was featured on his debut EP, "Caviar Dreams".

== Track listing ==
Digital download
No.	Title	Writer(s)	Producer(s)	Length
1.	"Levels"	Jadin Watson, Dimarjio Jenkins	DanberryBeatz	2:34

== Certifications ==
Region	Certification	Certified units/sales
Canada (Music Canada)	Gold	40,000^{‡}
^{‡} Sales+streaming figures based on certification alone.
