= Charmaine (rapper) =

Zimbabwean-Canadian rapper

Charmaine Willie, known as Charmaine is a Zimbabwean-Canadian rapper from Toronto, Ontario, who won the Juno Award for Rap Single of the Year at the Juno Awards of 2022 for her 2021 single "Bold".
