= When Smoke Rises =

2021 EP by Mustafa

EP by Mustafa
- Released: May 28, 2021
- Recorded: 2020
- Genres: Indie folk; R&B
- Length: 23:42
- Label: Regent Park Songs
- Producers: Frank Dukes; Jamie xx; James Blake

Mustafa chronology
When Smoke Rises (2021)	Dunya (2024)

Singles from When Smoke Rises
- 1. "Stay Alive" Released: March 10, 2020; 2. "Air Forces" Released: September 21, 2020; 3. "Ali" Released: March 30, 2021; 4. "The Hearse" Released: May 26, 2021

When Smoke Rises is the debut EP by Canadian musician and poet Mustafa. It was released on May 28, 2021, through Mustafa's Regent Park Songs imprint. The album was produced by frequent collaborator and executive producer Frank Dukes with contributions from James Blake, Jamie xx, and Sampha, among others. The songs "Stay Alive", "Air Forces", "Ali", and "The Hearse" were released as singles prior to the album's release. The album is self-described as 'inner city folk music' and is thematically centered on Toronto's Regent Park community.

The album was shortlisted for the 2021 Polaris Music Prize.

== Production ==
Mustafa began working on demos in the late 2010s. Formal songwriting for the album began in 2019 in London with Swedish producer Simon Hessman also known as Simon on the Moon. Following the songwriting process, frequent collaborator Frank Dukes came in to produce the album. His production was inspired by the Smithsonian Folkways anthologies of Sudanese and Egyptian music which he samples throughout the record. Additionally, tracks on the album were produced by London-based musicians James Blake, who contributed to "Stay Alive" and "Come Back", and Jamie xx, who produced "Air Forces" and "The Hearse".

Mustafa has noted that the songwriting of the record was influenced by Richie Havens, Joni Mitchell, and Leonard Cohen, as well as Sufjan Stevens' 2015 album Carrie & Lowell.

The album's name is in reference to Smoke Dawg who is featured on the cover art alongside Mustafa.

== Release and promotion ==
Professional ratings
Aggregate scores
Source	Rating
Metacritic	79/100
Review scores
Source	Rating
Evening Standard	4/5 stars
Exclaim!	9/10
The Guardian	3/5 stars
Pitchfork	7.3/10
Rolling Stone	4/5 stars

When Smoke Rises was released on May 28, 2021, fourteen months after the first single "Stay Alive" was released. It was released independently by Mustafa under the name Regent Park Songs and distributed by Beggars Group. A limited edition of the album pressed as different colour vinyl records was released by a number of independent record stores including Rough Trade and VMP (Vinyl Me, Please).

Mustafa appeared on The Tonight Show Starring Jimmy Fallon on May 27, 2021, to promote the release of the record. In the year leading up the release, Mustafa received significant press coverage, including profiles by The New York Times, GQ Middle East, Pitchfork, and American Songwriter.

Overall, the album received generally favourable reviews from critics, with particularly positive support from Canadian publications like Exclaim!

== Track listing ==
Songwriting credits adapted from SOCAN and liner notes.

When Smoke Rises track listing
No.	Title	Writer(s)	Producer(s)	Length
1.	"Stay Alive"	Mustafa Ahmed; cityboymoe; Adam Feeney; Simon Hessman	Frank Dukes; James Blake^{[a]}; Simon Hessman^{[b]}	3:01
2.	"Air Forces"	Ahmed; Feeney; Hessman; Mickey Newbury^{[A]}	Dukes; Jamie xx^{[a]}; Hessman^{[b]}	2:58
3.	"Separate"	Ahmed; cityboymoe; Feeney; Hessman	Dukes; Hessman^{[b]}	2:27
4.	"The Hearse"	Ahmed; James Smith; Feeney; Hessman; Matthew Tavares	Dukes; Jamie xx^{[b]}; Hessman^{[b]}	2:04
5.	"Capo" (featuring Sampha)	Ahmed; Sampha Sisay	Dukes	2:55
6.	"Ali"	Ahmed; Tavares; Feeney; Hessman	Dukes; Tavares^{[b]}; Hessman^{[b]}; Rodaidh McDonald^{[b]}	3:12
7.	"What About Heaven"	Ahmed; Dylan Wiggins; Feeney; Hessman	Dukes; Pete SCUM Nebula^{[b]}; Nate Mercereau^{[b]}	3:38
8.	"Come Back"	Ahmed; Feeney; Blake	Dukes; Blake	3:12
Total length:				23:42

Japanese edition (bonus tracks)
No.	Title	Writer(s)	Length
9.	"Come Back" (Live) (featuring James Blake)	Ahmed; Feeney; Blake
10.	"Ali" (Live)	Ahmed; Tavared; Feeney; Hessman
11.	"Stay Alive" (Live) (featuring James Blake)	Ahmed; cityboymoe; Feeney; Hessman

Notes

- ^{^[a]} signifies a co-producer.
- ^{^[b]} signifies an additional producer.
- "Stay Alive" features backing vocals by Sampha.
- "Air Forces" features uncredited background vocals by Frank Dukes.
- "Separate" features additional vocals from Fatima Ali and cityboymoe.
- "What About Heaven" features backing vocals by Sampha.
- "Come Back" features backing vocals by James Blake.

Sample credits

- ^{^[A]} "Air Forces" contains samples of "Heaven Help the Child", written and performed by Mickey Newbury; "The Age-Set" by Dinka People of Abyei from Music of the Sudan: The Role of Song and Dance in Dinka Society.
- "The Hearse" contains a sample of "The Spreading Horns" by Wife of the Paramount Chief from Music of the Sudan: The Role of Song and Dance in Dinka Society.
- "What About Heaven" contains samples of "Allah" from The Music of Upper and Lower Egypt; "The Tribe of Babo" by Dinka People of Abyei from Music of the Sudan: The Role of Song and Dance in Dinka Society.

== Personnel ==
Adapted from TIDAL, Jaxsta, and liner notes.

Musicians

- Mustafa – vocals
- Ben Reed – bass guitar ("Separate", "What About Heaven")
- cityboymoe – additional vocals ("Separate")
- David Wrench – additional music ("Air Forces")
- Dylan Wiggins (Sir Dylan) – keyboards ("What About Heaven")
- Fatima Ali – additional vocals ("Separate")
- Frank Dukes – synth (tracks 2, 3, 5, 8); drum programming (tracks 3, 4, 6, 7); programming ("Air Forces"); guitar ("Ali")
- James Blake – synth ("Stay Alive"); vocals, piano ("Come Back")
- Jamie xx – synth ("Air Forces", "The Hearse"); programming ("Air Forces")
- Matthew Tavares – guitar ("The Hearse", "Ali"); synth ("Ali")
- Nate Mercereau – bass guitar, horns ("What About Heaven")
- Pete SCUM Nebula (The Antydote) – arranger, programming, drum programming ("What About Heaven")
- Rodaidh McDonald – synth ("Ali")
- Sampha – featured vocals ("Capo"); backing vocals ("Stay Alive", "What About Heaven"); piano ("Capo"); bongos ("What About Heaven")
- Simon Hessman – guitar (tracks 1–4, 6, 7); synth bass ("Stay Alive")
- Teo Halm – bass guitar ("Stay Alive")

Spoken word and dialogue

- Rax ("Stay Alive")
- Puffy L'z ("Air Forces")
- SAFE ("The Hearse")
- Ali Rizeig ("Ali")
- CAPO ("Capo")
- Smoke Dawg ("Capo")
- AK ("Come Back")

Technical

- Manny Marroquin – mixing
- David Wrench – mixing ("Stay Alive", "Air Forces")
- Chris Galland – mix engineer
- Jeremie Inhaber – assistant mix engineer
- Robin Florent – assistant mix engineer
- Scott Desmarais – assistant mix engineer
- Emerson Mancini – mastering
- Matt Colton – mastering
