= Freddie Dredd =

Canadian rapper (born 1997)

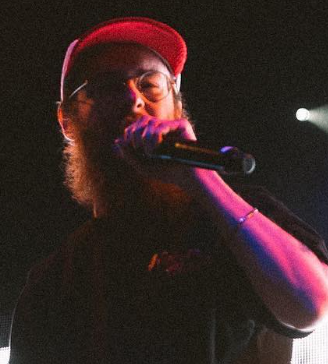
- Freddie Dredd performing in 2022

Background information
- Also known as: Ryan C.
- Born: Ryan Mitchel Chassels; September 19, 1997 (age 29)
- Origin: Oshawa, Ontario, Canada
- Genres: Hip hop; trap; horrorcore; phonk; memphis rap; experimental hip hop; alternative hip hop
- Occupations: Rapper; singer; record producer; songwriter
- Years active: 2014–present
- Labels: Doomshop Records; RCA
- Member of: SIXSET

Ryan Mitchel Chassels known professionally as Freddie Dredd, is a Canadian rapper, singer, producer and songwriter. He gained prominence on TikTok with several viral songs including "GTG", "Opaul", "Limbo" and "Cha Cha". Dredd is a member of the music collective Sixset and his music is released with RCA Records and Doomshop.

== Life and career ==
Dredd began uploading music to SoundCloud in 2014 under the producer name Ryan C. and rapper name Freddie Dredd. Dredd is one of the pioneers for the modern resurgence of phonk.

His fifth album, Freddie's Inferno, was released on August 11, 2022, along with The Slow Descent and Ghost Slowed versions in December 2022 and deluxe version in February 2023. The album was supported by two singles: "Kick Rocks" featuring Lil Darkie and "Limbo".

On July 3, 2024, his single "Limbo" was certified platinum in the United States by the RIAA. His songs "GTG", "Cha Cha", and "All Alone" are certified gold. In 2023, Dredd's song "Wrath" was nominated for a Juno Award in the Rap Single of the Year category. In March 2023, Dredd appeared on an episode of Family Feud Canada with Yung Gravy and bbno$.

== Discography ==
=== Studio albums ===
Title	Release date
Dredd	September 22, 2017
Freddie's Inferno	August 11, 2022
Freddie's Inferno - The Slow Descent	December 9, 2022
Freddie's Inferno - Ghost Slowed	December 16, 2022
Freddie's Inferno (Deluxe)	February 22, 2023
Cease & Disintegrate	November 21, 2024

=== Extended plays ===
Year	Title	Release date
2016	8ball Playaz	April 23, 2016
2016	Death Valley	August 2, 2016
2016	8ball Playaz 2	September 1, 2016
2017	Casper Flip	February 10, 2017
2018	Fade	January 8, 2018
2018	Pink Lotus	April 4, 2018
2019	Dreddalicious	February 6, 2019
2019	8ball Playaz 1 & 2	June 6, 2019
2019	Variety Pack EP, VOL.1	August 26, 2019
2020	Suffer	August 18, 2020

=== Singles ===
Year	Title	Release date	Certifications	Album
2018	"Evil Fantasy"	January 8, 2018		Non-album singles
2018	"Who Is Freddie Dredd?"	January 8, 2018		Non-album singles
2018	"Up"	February 14, 2018		Non-album singles
2018	"Movin'"	March 16, 2018		Non-album singles
2018	"Opaul"	April 26, 2018		Pink Lotus
2018	"Zoro / Pure Imagination"	June 20, 2018		Non-album singles
2018	"Oh Darling" (featuring Soudiere)	June 25, 2018		Non-album singles
2018	"Crown"	July 25, 2018		Non-album singles
2018	"GTG"	August 10, 2018	RIAA: Gold	Non-album singles
2018	"METÀ VITA"	September 7, 2018		Non-album singles
2018	"Catch Thirtythree"	September 14, 2018		Non-album singles
2018	"Conductor"	October 8, 2018		Non-album singles
2018	"Holiday"	October 23, 2018		Non-album singles
2018	"Stutter"	November 13, 2018		Non-album singles
2018	"Killin' On Demand"	December 18, 2018		Non-album singles
2019	"Viva Nao Mais"	January 4, 2019		Non-album singles
2019	"Redrum"	January 16, 2019		Non-album singles
2019	"Repo"	February 2, 2019		Non-album singles
2019	"On Me"	February 16, 2019		Non-album singles
2019	"Cha Cha"	March 22, 2019	RIAA: Gold	Non-album singles
2019	"Nasty"	April 4, 2019		Non-album singles
2019	"Slangin'"	April 16, 2019		Non-album singles
2019	"All Alone"	May 22, 2019	RIAA: Gold	Non-album singles
2019	"Ditty"	July 19, 2019		Non-album singles
2019	"Weather"	September 11, 2019		Non-album singles
2019	"Need a Hit" (with Soudiere)	September 12, 2019		Non-album singles
2020	"Necklace"	April 29, 2020		Non-album singles
2020	"Tool"	April 30, 2020		Non-album singles
2020	"Darko"	June 24, 2020		Non-album singles
2020	"Speak Up"	July 29, 2020		Non-album singles
2020	"Devil's Work"	August 11, 2020		Non-album singles
2021	"Doomset"	July 29, 2021		Non-album singles
2021	"Shut Up" (with LLusion and Lil Toe)	August 27, 2021		Non-album singles
2022	"Wrath"	June 9, 2022		Non-album singles
2022	"Greed"	June 30, 2022		Non-album singles
2022	"Kick Rocks" (featuring Lil Darkie)	July 28, 2022		Freddie's Inferno
2022	"Limbo"	August 11, 2022	RIAA: Platinum	Freddie's Inferno
2023	"Slump" (featuring NxxxxxS)	March 7, 2023		Short Term Agreement
2023	"POPTHATRUNK"	August 25, 2023		
2023	"Rockefeller"	October 31, 2023		Non-album singles
2024	"Frank Miller (Kill Again)"	February 1, 2024		Non-album singles
2024	"I'm So Glad"	February 1, 2024		Non-album singles
2024	"Plenty Guns"	June 6, 2024		Non-album singles
2024	"How Many"	July 1, 2024		Non-album singles
2024	"POS"	July 11, 2024		Non-album singles
2024	"Geek"	July 19, 2024		Non-album singles
2025	"GRAILED"	July 25, 2025		
