= Juno Award for Rap Single of the Year =

Music award category

The Juno Award for Rap Single of the Year is an annual Canadian music award, presented by the Juno Awards to honour songs by Canadian hip hop artists. Announced at the Juno Awards of 2021, it was presented for the first time at the Juno Awards of 2022.

The award is presented alongside a category for Rap Album or EP of the Year.

Until 2022, albums and individual songs were considered together under the single Rap Recording of the Year category. The changes were announced to coincide with the 30th anniversary of the creation of the Junos rap category.

== Winners and nominees ==
Year	Winner	Single	Nominees	Ref.
2022	Charmaine	"BOLD"	Anders and FRVRFRIDAY, "What I Like"; bbno$ feat. Rich Brian, "edamame"; NorthSideBenji and DJ Charlie B, "30,000"; Pressa feat. Taliban Glizzy, "Attachments"	
2023	Kaytranada feat. Anderson .Paak	"Twin Flame"	6ixbuzz and Pengz, "Alejandro Sosa"; Dom Vallie, "Been Himma"; Freddie Dredd, "Wrath"; Nav, "Wrong Decisions"	
2024	TOBi	"Someone I Knew"	Belly, "American Nightmare"; Haviah Mighty, "Honey Bun"; Pressa, "Minimum Wage"; Connor Price feat. Bens, "Spinnin'"	
2025	Jessie Reyez feat. Big Sean	"Shut Up"	Classified, "People"; Haviah Mighty, "Double the Fun"; Snotty Nose Rez Kids, "BBE"; Souldia feat. Lost, "Hier encore"	
2026	Tobi, Saukrates, Jully Black	"Who's Driving You?"	Freddie Dredd, "Pursuit"; Nav feat. Playboi Carti, "Unlimited"; Connor Price feat. Big Sean, "Mula"; SonReal feat. Snotty Nose Rez Kids, "Dumb"	
