= Do You Like Me? =

2023 single by Daniel Caesar

Single by Daniel Caesar

from the album Never Enough
- Released: January 27, 2023
- Length: 3:37
- Label: Republic
- Songwriters: Ashton Simmonds; Raphael Saadiq; Dylan Wiggins
- Producers: Daniel Caesar; Saadiq; Sir Dylan

Daniel Caesar singles chronology
"Please Do Not Lean" (2022)	"Do You Like Me?" (2023)	"Let Me Go" (2023)

Music video
- "Do You Like Me?" on YouTube

"Do You Like Me?" is a song by Canadian singer-songwriter Daniel Caesar. It was released through Republic Records as the lead single from his third studio album, Never Enough, on January 27, 2023. The song was written and produced by Caesar himself, Raphael Saadiq, and Sir Dylan.

== Background ==
Three days before "Do You Like Me?" was released, Caesar teased the song through social media with a clip of its music video and when it was released, he explained that it is "a song about a woman I respect deeply", furtherly elaborating that it is "90 degrees of a love triangle". He also said "that this is an introduction to the sound and tone of the next chapter in my career".

On April 7, 2023, the same day that Never Enough was released, Caesar was interviewed by Variety, in which he spoke on working with producer Raphael Saadiq on the song:

It was [daunting], until you're in there for 15 minutes, and then you're, like, "Oh, this guy's as cool as fuck." He makes you feel comfortable. He's also full of stories, so if you're nervous, you can just listen. And you know, he's only in there because he respects you already, so you can just cook and he's there.

== Composition and lyrics ==
On "Do You Like Me?", Caesar asks a woman if she shares the same positive feelings for him that he does for her, singing in the chorus of the song: "Do you like the way I talk to you? / Do I titillate your mind? / Gotta say I like your attitude / And I'd love to make you mine / But I gotta know".

== Music video ==
The official music video for "Do You Like Me?", directed by Machine Operated, premiered on February 1, 2023. It sees Caesar walking inside an apartment building after working as he sees a woman burn a picture of them together, in which they get into an argument that is subtitled in Portuguese and she angrily asks him where he had been and he does not understand the reason for her anger.

== Charts ==
Chart performance for "Do You Like Me?"
Chart (2022)	Peak position
Canada Hot 100 (Billboard)	83
New Zealand Hot Singles (RMNZ)	10
