= Mustafa the Poet =

Sudanese Canadian poet and singer (born 1996)

Mustafa
- Born: Mustafa Ahmed; 28 July 1996 (age 30); Toronto, Ontario, Canada
- Genre: Folk
- Occupations: Poet; singer; songwriter; filmmaker
- Years active: 2016–present
- Member of: Halal Gang

Mustafa Ahmed, known mononymously as Mustafa and formerly as Mustafa the Poet, is a Sudanese-Canadian poet, folk artist from Regent Park, Toronto. He first came to prominence as a young spoken-word poet and as a member of the Toronto collective Halal Gang, before becoming one of the most sought-after songwriters in contemporary music, co-writing songs for artists including Drake, Justin Bieber, the Weeknd, Daniel Caesar, Metro Boomin, Omar Apollo, Camila Cabello, the Jonas Brothers, Shawn Mendes and Rex Orange County.

As a solo artist, Mustafa released the critically acclaimed EP When Smoke Rises, in 2021 - an tribute for his friends lost to violence, including fellow Halal Gang member Smoke Dawg - followed by his debut album Dunya in 2024, which drew on his Sudanese heritage and incorporated traditional Arabic instrumentation. Both projects earned Polaris Music Prize shortlist nominations, and Mustafa has won multiple Juno Awards across songwriting, video, and album categories.

Mustafa is the founder of Artists for Aid, a benefit concert series that has raised millions of dollars for humanitarian relief in Sudan and Palestine, featuring lineups including Daniel Caesar, Chappell Roan, Lucy Dacus, Geese, Jazmine Sullivan, Clairo, Shawn Mendes, Blood Orange, Stormzy, FKA Twigs and others.

== Early life ==
Mustafa Ahmed was born in Toronto, Ontario to Sudanese parents. He grew up in Regent Park, one of Toronto's oldest housing projects. Mustafa attended Regent Park Duke of York Public School.

Mustafa first came to fame for his poetry. He was inspired to write by his older sister, who taught him the healing effects of poetry at a young age. When he was in the seventh grade, Mustafa performed an original piece, "A Single Rose", at Nelson Mandela Park Public School. It attracted praise at Hot Docs Canadian International Documentary Festival in 2009.

== Career ==
=== 2014–2016: Poetry and Halal Gang ===
Mustafa was first profiled in the Toronto Star at the age of 12, which highlighted his ability to describe and connect white and non-Black audiences to the gritty side of Toronto.

On 4 October 2014, Mustafa published "Rabba" with the Toronto-based artist collective Halal Gang. Members included Mustafa (aka Mustafa the Poet), Puffy L’z, Mo-G, Safe, and Smoke Dawg. As member of Canadian hip hop collective Halal Gang, he starred in a number of music videos, including the single "Feel" by Safe released in October 2016.

In 2016, Mustafa was appointed to Justin Trudeau's Youth Advisory Council.

=== 2017–2019: Remember Me, Toronto ===
Poetry and film

Mustafa performed at the Fast in the 6 festival at Nathan Phillips Square held on 1 June 2018.

In March 2019, Italian fashion designer Pierpaolo Piccioli collaborated Mustafa and three other poets for Valentino's autumn/winter 2019 collection. A line from his poem "From the Perspective of Black Love" was featured as part of the collection. He describes attending the show as an emotional experience, seeing women in creations made for their bodies. Vogue described the event as "poetry back in fashion". His collaborations would be worn by Emilia Clarke at a Game of Thrones premiere.

Still under the name of Mustafa the Poet, he produced and released Remember Me, Toronto, a short Canadian documentary film about the hip hop culture in Canada in 17 March 2019. Created for the Canadian hip hop community, the documentary discusses the losing of people due to the increasing gun violence and homicide rates in Toronto over the past decade. Mustafa said that he aimed to discuss the systemic structure working against the lower economies of Toronto and wanted to give these artists the opportunity to "rewrite their memories and the memories of those they lost." In the film, the artists reflect on the inter generational nature of trauma and gun violence. Artists featured included Drake, Baka Not Nice, Gilla, Pilla B, TJin, Pressa, Loco City, Smiley, Top 5, Blockboi, Twitch, Jay Whiss, Puffy L'z, Rax, Booggz, Yung Lava, and archival footage from the murdered artist Smoke Dawg.

Music and songwriting

Mustafa has co-written several popular singles as a songwriter, often closely collaborating with Toronto producer Frank Dukes.

In 2016, Mustafa would begin working with Dukes and co-wrote the song "Attention" by The Weeknd on the latter's album Starboy. Mustafa would also provide some background vocals. The following year, he co-wrote two tracks on Camila Cabello's debut album Camila, "All These Years" and the single "She Loves Control". He was featured on the Now's list of Toronto musicians to watch for in 2017. In 2019, he co-wrote the Jonas Brothers single "Sucker".

He went on to title all the songs in Frank Dukes Parkscapes sample pack released in June 2019, which would be used on Taylor Swift's album Lover. He dedicated part of the album's royalties to his alma mater, Regent Park School. That year, he was noted as "one of the 10 Canadian songwriters who are penning the biggest hit songs right now" by CBC Music. In 2020, he once again aided Frank Dukes in co-writing the Shawn Mendes and Justin Bieber single "Monster".

=== 2020–present: When Smoke Rises ===
On 10 March 2020, Mustafa released his debut single "Stay Alive". The single was dedicated to those he'd lost to gun violence and was known for capturing Regent's Park resiliency. The single was produced by Frank Dukes and James Blake. The single featured numerous cameos from Toronto rappers including Halal Gang members Puffy L'z and Mo-G as well as Lil Berete. It was known for including lyrics about resilience, community, and the bleak realities of living on the fringes pair perfectly. The single prompted Complex to list Mustafa on the list of Best New Artists of the March 2020.

Mustafa released his debut EP When Smoke Rises on 28 May 2021. Described as "inner city folk music", the EP was written and produced with Simon on the Moon and Frank Dukes, along with James Blake, Jamie xx, and Sampha, among others. The EP won the 2022 Juno Award for Alternative Album of the Year and was shortlisted for the 2021 Polaris Music Prize.

Mustafa was featured on Metro Boomin's 2022 album Heroes & Villains, on the track "Walk Em Down (Don't Kill Civilians)", alongside rapper 21 Savage.

In July 2023, Mustafa's older brother Mohamed Ahmed was killed in a shooting.

On 4 January 2024, Mustafa organized a benefit concert at the New Jersey Newark Symphony Hall for food and medical supply distribution in Gaza and Sudan with a number of artists including musicians Clairo, Daniel Caesar, Stormzy, comedian Ramy Youssef, and poets Hala Alyan and Safia Elhillo. The sold-out concert at the 3,500-person venue attracted more than 220,000 livestream views on Instagram. Concert proceeds went to the relief organization Human Concern International for Palestine.

On 2 September 2025, he joined Dua Lipa on stage at the Radical Optimism Tour at her Toronto concert to perform “Name of God”.

On 3 September 2025, he appeared on the NPR Tiny Desk series. With the accompaniment of a Sudanese choir, they performed played "Name of God," "I'll Go Anywhere," and "What Happened, Mohamed?".

On 16 September, he won the inaugural Polaris SOCAN Song Prize the 2025 Polaris Music Prize for his song "Gaza Is Calling".

== Discography ==
=== Albums ===
Title	Details
Dunya	Released: 27 September 2024; Label: Jagjaguwar; Formats: LP, CD, digital

=== EP ===
Title	Details
When Smoke Rises	Released: 28 May 2021; Label: Regent Park Songs; Formats: LP, CD, digital

=== Singles ===
Title	Year	Album
"Stay Alive"	2020	When Smoke Rises
"Air Forces"	2020	When Smoke Rises
"Ali"	2021	When Smoke Rises
"The Hearse"	2021	When Smoke Rises
"Name of God"	2023	Dunya
"Imaan"	2024	Dunya
"Gaza is Calling"	2024	Dunya
"SNL"	2024	Dunya

=== Other charted songs ===
List of other charted songs, with selected chart positions
Title	Year	Peak chart positions					Album
Title	Year	US	US R&B/HH	US Rap	CAN	WW	Album
"Walk Em Down (Don't Kill Civilians)" (Metro Boomin and 21 Savage featuring Mustafa)	2022	52	19	12	28	59	Heroes & Villains

=== Guest appearances ===
Title	Year	Other artist(s)	Album
"Walk Em Down (Don't Kill Civilians)"	2022	Metro Boomin, 21 Savage	Heroes & Villains
"Toronto 2014"	2023	Daniel Caesar	Never Enough
"Plane Trees"	2024	Omar Apollo	God Said No
"Mind Loaded"	2025	Blood Orange, Caroline Polachek, Lorde	Essex Honey
"I Can Go"	2025	Blood Orange, Mabe Fratti	Essex Honey

=== Songwriting credits ===
Year	Artist	Album	Song
2016	Brendan Canning	Home Wrecking Years (credited as vocalist)	
2016	The Weeknd	Starboy	"Attention"
2017	BRIDGE	Wreck	"Lord Knows"
2018	Camila Cabello	Camila	"All These Years"
2018	Camila Cabello	Camila	"She Loves Control"
2018	Black Atlass	Pain & Pleasure	"Fantasy"
2018	Hello Yello	Love Wins	"Feel That Again"
2019	Jonas Brothers	Happiness Begins	"Sucker"
2019	SAFE	Stay	"No Rush"
2019	SAFE	Stay	"Red Light"
2019	SAFE	Stay	"Wasteland"
2019	SAFE	Stay	"Summer's End 2"
2019	SAFE	Stay	"Piano"
2019	SAFE	Stay	"Nobody Cares"
2019	SAFE	Stay	"R U Scared, Pt. 2"
2019	Majid Jordan	Non-album single	"Caught Up" (featuring Khalid)
2020	Shawn Mendes and Justin Bieber	Wonder	"Monster"
2021	Charlotte Day Wilson	Alpha	"Keep Moving"
2021	Nemahsis	Non-album single	"What If I Took It Off For You?"
2023	Omar Apollo	Non-album single	"3 Boys"
2025	Daniel Caesar	Son of Spergy	"Have A Baby (With Me)"
2025	Daniel Caesar	Son of Spergy	"Root of All Evil"
2025	Daniel Caesar	Son of Spergy	"Who Knows"
2025	Daniel Caesar	Son of Spergy	"Touching God" (featuring Yebba and Blood Orange)

== Filmography ==
Film and television
Year	Title	Role	Notes
2019	Remember Me, Toronto	—N/a	Producer and Director

== Awards and nominations ==
Year	Ceremony	Award	Nominated work	Result	Ref
2019	60th Grammy Awards	Best Urban Contemporary Album	Starboy (as songwriter)	Won	
2019	61st Grammy Awards	Best Pop Vocal Album	Camila (as songwriter)	Nominated	
2020	BMI Pop Awards	Award Winning Song	"Sucker" (as songwriter)	Won	
2020	SOCAN Awards	Pop Music Awards	"Sucker" (as songwriter)	Won	
2021	SOCAN Awards	Pop Music Awards	"Monster" (as songwriter)	Won	
2021	AIM Awards	Best Independent Track	"Air Forces"	Nominated	
2021	2021 Polaris Music Prize	Polaris Music Prize	When Smoke Rises	Shortlisted	
2022	2022 Juno Awards	Alternative Album of the Year	When Smoke Rises	Won	
2022	2022 Juno Awards	Songwriter of the Year	Himself	Nominated	
2022	Prism Prize	Best Music Video	"Ali" (music video)	Won	
2022	Prism Prize	Willie Dunn Award	Himself	Won	
2024	Prism Prize	Best Music Video	"Name of God"	Won	
2025	2025 Polaris Music Prize	Polaris Music Prize	Dunya	Nominated	
2025	2025 Polaris Music Prize	Polaris SOCAN Song Prize	"Gaza Is Calling"	Won	
