= Pressa (rapper) =

Canadian rapper

- Also known as: Pressa Armani
- Born: Quinton Armani Gardner; May 10, 1996 (age 30); Toronto, Ontario, Canada
- Genres: Canadian hip hop; trap
- Occupations: Rapper; singer; songwriter
- Years active: 2015–present
- Label: Blue Feathers

Quinton Armani Gardner (born May 10, 1996), professionally known as Pressa, is a rapper and singer from Toronto.

== Early life ==
Quinton Armani Gardner was born on May 10, 1996, in Toronto, Ontario to a Filipino mother and a Jamaican father. He was five weeks old when his father was sentenced to 15 years in prison for second-degree murder, which left his mother to care for him and his older brother. He grew up in an area known as Driftwood in the Jane and Finch neighbourhood of Toronto.

== Career ==
=== 2016–2018 ===
Gardner rose to prominence after the release of his hit single "Novacane", which was produced by frequent collaborator Murda Beatz. In 2017, he opened for Drake on his Boy Meets World Tour despite being on bail for kidnapping allegations, and was featured in 6ix Rising, a Canadian documentary film about the hip hop culture in Canada. Later that year, he gained significant attention for his unique flow on his single "Canada Goose" featuring Tory Lanez, which was released in December. Pressa has also worked with overseas artists including British rapper Giggs, releasing the single "Sexy" in April 2017, and he was featured in K Koke's single "D Ting Set" in the same year. In October 2018, Pressa released the single "420 in London" featuring Lil Uzi Vert. He was featured on the song "Up & Down" by 6ixBuzz alongside Houdini, which amassed over 1 million views on YouTube within the 1st month of release.

=== 2019–present ===
In 2019, Gardner released Prestige, an album named after his father, which debuted at the number 1 spot on the iTunes Canada hip hop music charts. It featured appearances from Burna Bandz as well as Lil Richie. Pressa collaborated with British rapper Russ and Taze on the single "Vida Loca", released in July 2019. Pressa's latest single, "O.T.M. (Out The Mud)", was released on February 7, 2020, via WorldStarHipHop.

In May 2020, he signed with Sony Music Canada, in conjunction with Blue Feathers Records, coinciding with his release of his single "96 Freestyle".

== Personal life ==
As of 2019, Gardner is currently living in Los Angeles, California, having been relocated from Toronto. In April 2021, he began a relationship with Coi Leray, daughter of Benzino.

== Discography ==
=== Studio albums ===
- 2019: Prestige
- 2021: Gardner Express (Deluxe)
- 2025: Press Machine II

=== Mixtapes ===
- 2017: Press Machine
- 2017: Press a Brick

=== Extended plays ===
- 2020: Gardner Express

=== Compilation albums ===
- 2018: southside Jane (by UpTop Movement Inc.)
- 2018: 6ixUpsideDown (by 6ixBuzz)
- 2019: NorthernSound (by 6ixBuzz)
- 2021: Canada's Most Wanted (by 6ixbuzz)

=== Singles ===
List of singles, showing year released, peak chart position and certifications
Title	Year	Peak chart positions	Certifications
Title	Year	CAN	Certifications
"Canada Goose" ft. Tory Lanez	2017	—	MC: Platinum
"Up & Down" ft. Houdini & 6ixBuzz	2018	—	MC: Gold
"420 in London" ft. Lil Uzi Vert	2018	—	MC: Gold
"96 Freestyle"	2020	—	MC: Gold
"O.T.M (Out the Mud)"	2020	—	MC: Gold
"Attachments"	2020	—	MC: 2x Platinum
"Head Tap " ft. Sleepy Hallow & Sheff G	2020	—	MC: Gold
"Blackberry Zap" ft. Jackboy	2020	—	MC: Gold
"Mansion" ft. Houdini & 6ixBuzz	2020	—	MC: Gold
"—" denotes a recording that did not chart or was not released in that territory.

=== Guest appearances ===
List of non-single guest appearances, with other performing artists, showing year released and album name
Title	Year	Other performer(s)	Album
"Thump Chronicles Vol. 1"	2021	Goldlink	HARAM!
"Chrome Hearts"	2021	Drakeo the Ruler	The Truth Hurts
"Pressure"	2022	Jim Jones, Mack 11	We Set the Trends
"Make It Happen"	2022	OhGeesy, Bun Dog	GEESYWORLD (Deluxe)
"401"	2023	Top5, 6ixbuzz	Pedro Activated
"Kill Switch"	2023	Tony Yayo	The Loyal
"DWTD"	2024	Coach, NorthSideBenji	–

== Awards and nominations ==
Year	Nominee / work	Award	Result
2022	"Attachments" (feat. Taliban Glizzy)	Juno Award for Rap Single of the Year	Nominated

== Filmography ==
Film and Television
Year	Title	Role	Notes
2017	6ix Rising	Himself	Documentary of Toronto's rising hip-hop scene featuring numerous Canadian rap artists.
2019	Remember Me, Toronto	Himself	Short film by Mustafa the Poet
