= NorthSideBenji =

Canadian rapper

- Born: Jaiden Anthony Watson; January 25, 1998 (age 28)
- Origin: Brampton, Ontario, Canada
- Genres: Canadian hip hop
- Years active: 2016–present
- Label: NRTHRN

Jaiden Anthony Watson (born January 25, 1998), better known by his stage name NorthSideBenji, is a Canadian rapper and musician from Brampton, Ontario. Benji gained recognition from his Certified Gold single "Levels", which featured Toronto rapper Houdini. The single was released in December 2018, and was the only supporting single of his debut extended play, Caviar Dreams, which was released on January 18, 2019. He released his second EP Frienemy on September 6, 2019.

== Career ==
NorthSideBenji began rapping in 2016 where he released numerous freestyles and songs. He released several singles and built a digital following of over 33,000 fans. He is independently signed to Music 4 Life. He released the single "Again" on October 31, 2017, and "Confessions" on December 11, 2017. He released a Fire In The Booth freestyle session with Charlie Sloth on January 6, 2018. In early 2018, he announced that he is working on his debut EP, titled Caviar Dreams, which was due to be released in July 2018, however, the album was delayed and was officially released on January 18, 2019. He released the third single of the EP "Levels" featuring Houdini on January 25, 2019. In which it speaks of the heart of getting out of their current circumstances and living a life of "Caviar Dreams" Erin Lowers of Exclaim! describes Caviar Dreams as "mellow in its approach, but captivating in its deliveries" and gave it an 8 out of 10. He was listed as one of 15 Toronto rappers you should know by XXL.

He released his second Fire in the Booth session on August 26, 2019, which featured support from rapper Nines, The freestyle was released in promotion of his sophomore EP, Frienemy, which was released on September 6, 2019, with five tracks. Frienemy was described on the iTunes store as a "more succinct, in-your-face statement than its slow-burning predecessor, Caviar Dreams". The music video for the title track was released on September 29, 2019, on the British music website platform GRM Daily. NorthSideBenji also supported Canadian singer-songwriter Neena Rose on the single "Secret" released in October, 2019. He also made an appearance on the lead single "Too Soft" alongside Houdini in 6ixbuzz's second compilation album NorthernSound released on December 13, 2019.

His single "Levels" was Certified Gold by Music Canada on April 7, 2020.

He is featured on the tracks "Don't Change" and "Flex" on Nines' third studio album Crabs in a Bucket, which reached number one on the UK Albums Chart.

== Discography ==
=== Compilation albums ===
List of compilation albums
Title	Album details	Peak chart positions
Title	Album details	CAN
The Extravagant Collection	Released: October 22, 2021; Label: NRTHRN; Format: Digital download, streaming	17

=== Extended plays ===
List of extended plays
Title	EP details
Caviar Dreams	Released: January 18, 2019; Label: Self-released; Format: Digital download, streaming
Frienemy	Released: September 6, 2019; Label: Self-released; Format: Digital download, streaming

=== Singles ===
==== As lead artist ====
Title	Year	Certifications	Album
"Again"	2017		Non-album singles
"Came to Conquer" (featuring Houdini and Robin Banks)	2017		Non-album singles
"Left Hollywood"	2017		Non-album singles
"Confessions"	2017		Cavier Dreams
"Levels" (featuring Houdini)	2019	MC: Gold	Cavier Dreams
"Winner"	2019		Cavier Dreams
"Frienemy"	2019		Frienemy
"Clicquot"	2020		Frienemy

==== As a featured artist ====
Title	Year	Peak chart positions	Album
Title	Year	UK	Album
"Too Soft" (6ixBuzz featuring Houdini and NorthSideBenji)	2019	—	NorthernSound
Don't Change" (Nines featuring NorthSideBenji)	2020	99	Crabs in a Bucket

== Awards and nominations ==
Year	Nominee / work	Award	Result
2022	"30'000" (with DJ Charlie B)	Juno Award for Rap Single of the Year	Nominated
2022	The Extravagant Collection	Juno Award for Rap Album of the Year	Nominated
