= 6ixBuzz =

Online media platform

- Industry: Tabloid Journalism, Misinformation
- Genre: Tabloid journalism; Disinformation
- Founded: September 22, 2017; 9 years ago (platform); February 19, 2018; 8 years ago (company)
- Founders: Abraham Tekabo, Sarman Esagholian
- Headquarters: Toronto, Ontario, Canada
- Divisions: 6ixBuzz Entertainment
- Website: 6ix.buzz

6ixBuzz (pronounced Six Buzz), is a controversial online media platform based in Toronto, Ontario.

Founded in 2017 by Abraham Tekabo, 6ixBuzz is best known for sharing user-generated content, clickbait, and local news in a tabloid format. The company has been criticized for spreading misinformation, disinformation, right-wing bias, racism, islamophobia, homophobia, anti-feminism, and perpetuating racial and religious stereotypes, particularly Anti-Asian, Anti-Sikh sentiment and Anti-Indian sentiment.

== Background ==
6ixBuzz began in 2017 as a meme and parody news profile on Instagram with a focus on showcasing Toronto's underground music scene. In January 2021, the company launched a re-faced website and mobile app.

Its founders, Sarman Esagholian and Abraham Tekabo, attribute the success of their online presence to the "lack of voice" of communities surrounding Canadian hip hop culture. As 6ixBuzz grew to over a million followers on Instagram, its account has become known for its virality, encouragement of erratic stunts, bullying, and racial divide.

A CBC Arts episode in May 2025 summarized this tension: while 6ixBuzz initially served as a voice for underrepresented Black and brown youth, as its influence grew, it isolated those very communities as it spread anti-immigrant, anti-Asian, and anti-South Asian hate and became a central focus of public scrutiny.

== Criticism and controversies ==
=== Threats to journalists ===
In 2019, Toronto Life tasked a journalist with interviewing Sarman Esagholian, one of the founders of 6ixBuzz. However, the magazine declined Esagholian's request to keep the founders' identities confidential. When Esagholian learned that his name would be disclosed, he adopted an intimidating stance. He relentlessly called the writer, making dozens of calls within a 15-minute period. Frustrated with not receiving the desired response, Esagholian hinted at potential consequences if the journalist's whereabouts were revealed, including making threats insisting he knew where the reporter and their family slept at night.

Faced with this alarming situation, the writer withdrew from the assignment, prompting the magazine to assign the piece to another journalist. In a disconcerting pattern, Abraham Tekabo, another founder of 6ixBuzz, also issued similar death threats to the new journalist, leading to the abandonment of the pursuit once again.

=== Spreading of misinformation and far-right ideology ===
Throughout the COVID-19 pandemic in Canada, 6ixBuzz has consistently published posts that are anti-vax and anti-lockdown. They have been accused of spreading misinformation commonly associated with far-right politics. These accusations have been buoyed by frequent appearances of individuals associated with the far-right such as Chris Sky and Maxime Bernier.

=== South Asian hate and negative portrayal of Brampton ===
6ixBuzz has faced repeated criticism for content that allegedly mocks and stereotypes residents of Brampton, Ontario, a suburb of Toronto where over 80% of the population is racialized, with South Asian Canadians forming the largest demographic. The platform has been accused of reinforcing negative stereotypes and xenophobic attitudes toward Sikh Canadians, Indian international students, and the broader South Asian community. Many Brampton residents have criticized the account for contributing to an unfairly negative image of the city.

Critics argue that 6ixBuzz's content frequently reinforces anti-South Asian sentiment by promoting narratives that incite xenophobic reactions. The platform has been accused of sharing videos that depict individuals with brown skin, presumed to be of Indian origin, in a negative light, while allowing racist comments to remain unmoderated. Additionally, travel-related content featuring visits to India often attracts remarks that reinforce stereotypes about Brampton's South Asian community.

A 2024 study by the Institute for Research on Public Policy highlights how platforms like 6ixBuzz contribute to narratives portraying Indian immigrants and students as a demographic concern, with Brampton frequently singled out as an example. These portrayals reflect broader patterns of anti-Indian racism in Canada, which scholars argue are increasingly amplified through social media. Critics contend that such narratives frame Brampton's South Asian population as a cultural or economic threat rather than an integral part of Canadian society.

=== East Asian hate ===
During the beginning of the COVID-19 pandemic in Canada, 6ixBuzz was reported to have been causing harm to Chinese-owned businesses in Ontario due to its coverage of the pandemic. A Markham, Ontario, based noodle shop named "Wuhan Noodle 1950" claimed that they lost nearly two-thirds of their customer base in part due to an Instagram post by 6ixBuzz which was defamatory in nature. The post was eventually removed from the account on April 2, 2020.

The media group also posted videos and photos of the COVID-19 pandemic in China, allegedly perpetuating stereotypes and suggesting people of Chinese and Asian descent were to blame for the COVID-19 pandemic.

=== Promotion of negative personalities ===
6ixBuzz has been associated with promoting negative content in order to garner views. This has included promotion of controversial figures such as Marcella Christiana Zoia-Ferreira, dubbed Chair Girl who came to notoriety through 6ixBuzz after a video was posted of her throwing a chair onto the Gardiner Expressway in February 2019. Zoia later pleaded guilty in July 2020 to "Mischief Endangering Life" and received a $2,000 fine, 2 years probation and community service as well as counselling for her drinking problem.

The platform regularly poked fun at and exploited a homeless teenager from Toronto called "Debby", real name Alexis Matos, in order to garner views. Many of the videos posted to the platform showed her dealing with mental health issues in public, with people taunting and fighting her. Matos died November 2, 2021, following an overdose of fentanyl.

In May 2020, Mustafa the Poet, a songwriter and filmmaker from Toronto, tweeted "6ixBuzz pits communities against each other."

== 6ixBuzz Entertainment ==
6ixBuzz Entertainment is a Canadian record label and a division of 6ixBuzz. Founded in 2018, the label currently releases compilation albums featuring Canadian hip hop artists, most of them based in Toronto. 6ixUpsideDown was released on October 19, 2018, and featured Pressa, Yung Tory, Big Lean, and Safe amongst other Toronto artists. It peaked at number 87 on the Billboard Canadian Hot 100 on November 3, 2018, and remained on the charts for 1 week.

Its second compilation, NorthernSound, was released on December 13, 2019, and including vocal appearances from NorthSideBenji, Puffy L'z, Prime Boys, Pvrx, Archee & French, and more. The record featured the last work of Bvlly and Why-S before their deaths on December 24, 2019.

In April 2020, the label announced a joint-venture record deal with Warner Music Canada, coinciding with the release of the single "VV's" featuring Killy and Houdini. This was followed by the single "Mansions" by Pressa and Houdini, which came after the death of Houdini after he was gunned down in May 2020. This was followed by the single "Name Brand" featuring LB Spiffy and Smiley in June. All three singles are said to be on the labels upcoming compilation album Canada's Most Wanted. Other artist including 88Glam, Top5 and French also made an appearance on the album. The album was officially released on June 11, 2021.

=== Releases ===
Year	Title	Chart	Position
2018	6ixUpsideDown	Canadian Albums Chart (Billboard)	87
2019	NorthernSound	-	-
2021	Canada's Most Wanted	-	-

=== Awards and nominations ===
Year	Nominee / work	Award	Result
2023	"Alejandro Sosa" (with Pengz)	Juno Award for Rap Single of the Year	Nominated

== See also ==
- Canadian hip hop
- HipHopCanada
- WorldStarHipHop
- Alt-right pipeline
