= Houdini (rapper) =

Canadian rapper (1998–2020)

Background information
- Also known as: DaHoudini
- Born: Dimarjio Antonio Jenkins; July 23, 1998; Toronto, Ontario, Canada
- Died: May 26, 2020 (aged 21) Toronto, Ontario, Canada
- Genres: Canadian hip hop
- Occupations: Rapper; songwriter
- Years active: 2016–2020
- Labels: Uptop Movement; Warner Music Canada; Create Music Group

Dimarjio Antonio Jenkins (July 23, 1998 – May 26, 2020), better known by his stage name Houdini, was a Canadian rapper from Toronto, Ontario. He first gained recognition from his certified gold single "Late Nights" which contained vocal features from Burna Bandz and was released in 2017. This was followed by the singles "Myself" and "Backseat". He was also known for his frequent collaborations with fellow rappers Pressa, Robin Banks and NorthSideBenji, which includes the latter's certified gold single "Levels" which saw a feature from Houdini. He released his debut mixtape Hou I Am on February 13, 2019. His sophomore mixtape Hou Woulda Thought followed on August 2, 2019. His debut EP underGROUND was released on March 18, 2020. This would be his last release during his lifetime as he was shot and killed on May 26, 2020.

== Music career ==
Jenkins started his career in 2016, taking on the stage name "DaHoudini", and adopted the shorter "Houdini" stage name in 2018. He began to release various freestyles through social platforms. He gained recognition having featured on the single 456 alongside TallupTwinz and Burna Bandz released on August 17, 2017. Canadian rapper Robin Banks founded UpTop Movement Inc. in the same year, a record label based in Toronto. The record label showcases young and upcoming artists from the North-West end of Toronto and signed Houdini to the label.

Houdini released the single Late Nights featuring Burna Bandz on May 8, 2018. The music video amassed millions of views within a month of being released.

On April 1, 2018, Houdini and fellow associates such as Burna Bandz, Pressa, Robin Banks and other UpTop Movement artist dropped a joint mixtape featuring 27 songs titled Northside Jane including "Late Nights", "One of Mines" and "No Favours", which combined have over 20 million views on YouTube.

Houdini released his debut mixtape Hou I Am on February 13, 2019. The mixtape featured guest appearances from NorthSideBenji, Burna Bandz, Tallup Twinz, Pressa, and J Neat. The album peaked at 27 on the Canadian Independent Music Charts. Houdini was featured on NorthSideBenji's single "Levels", which was certified gold by Music Canada on April 7, 2020. On April 18, 2019, Houdini released an acoustic version of his single Myself with viral ukulele player Einer Bankz.

His second mixtape, Hou Woulda Thought was released on August 2, 2019. It was supported by the singles; "Freak", "Kenzo", "Belmont Boyz" and "Ain’t Gon' Cap" and the album lists no featured guests, unlike the previous mixtape. Both mixtapes were released independently via Create Music Group.

His third release, a five-track EP titled underGROUND which released on March 18, 2020. It was the last studio album Houdini dropped while alive. The debut EP was supported by the singles "Big Time" and "Fantastic". In April 2020, 6ixBuzz announced a joint-venture record deal with Warner Music Canada, coinciding with the release of the single "VV's" featuring Killy and Houdini.

=== Posthumous releases ===
The first posthumous release by the late artist was on the single "Mansion" alongside Pressa. It was released July 17, 2020 and was featured on 6ixBuzz's compilation album Canada's Most Wanted. On January 8, 2021, Pressa released a graphic on Instagram stating that "Mansion" was certified gold by Music Canada, and was nominated for the Rap Recording of the Year Juno Award 2021.

Houdini's single "Late Nights" was certified gold posthumously by Music Canada on January 12, 2021.

On July 23, 2024, on what would have been his 26th birthday, Houdini's estate announced via Instagram that his debut studio album, HOU I'M MEANT TO BE, is scheduled to be posthumously released with 6ixBuzz on August 24, 2024.

== Death ==
Jenkins was shot and killed on May 26, 2020, while shopping in Downtown Toronto. A 15-year-old boy and a 27-year-old woman were also injured in the incident but were expected to recover after gunfire erupted around 4 pm outside the Bisha Hotel in Toronto’s Entertainment District. Jenkins was rushed to the hospital, where he was pronounced dead. The following day, Toronto Police released the shooting footage and said that Jenkins was targeted in an orchestrated "gang attack". Rappers and associates including NorthSideBenji, Pressa, Killy, Tory Lanez and Meek Mill paid tribute to the artist. A warrant was issued for Eleijah Robinson on May 30, 2020, in connection with the murder.

=== Funeral shooting incident ===
On June 8, 2020, a funeral service for Jenkins was held in Mississauga early in the day. The following day on June 9, a vigil was held for the fallen rapper. During the vigil, gunfire erupted behind the Blaxx Restaurant and Dive Bar, located on Beverly Hills Drive. A dark-coloured sedan pulled over before occupants got out of the vehicle and opened fire at the crowd gathered outside. Gaddiel O’Neil Ledinek, better known by his stage name GD, and Traequan Mahoney, known by his stage name Burna Bandz, retaliated in the gunfire and were subsequently charged with gun offences. Police have also issued warrants for the arrest of Terrell Burke Whittaker, 24, of Brampton, and Javontae Johnson, 18, of Pickering. Both are alleged to have been in possession of firearms and allegedly discharged them during the incident.

== Discography ==
=== Albums ===
- 2024: Hou I'm Meant To Be

=== Extended plays ===
- 2020: underGROUND

=== Mixtapes ===
- 2019: Hou I Am
- 2019: Hou Woulda Thought

=== Appearance on compilation albums ===
==== By 6ixBuzz ====
- 2018: 6ixUpsideDown
- 2019: NorthernSound
- 2021: Canada's Most Wanted

==== Other albums ====
- 2019: Northside Jane (by Uptop Movement)

=== Singles ===
==== As primary artist ====
- 2017: "Late Nights" (with Burna Bandz)
- 2019: "Myself"
- 2019: "Backseat" (feat. J Neat)
- 2022: "Here it Goes" (feat. Tory Lanez)

==== As featured artist ====
- 2019: "Levels" (NorthSideBenji feat. Houdini)
- 2020: "Mansion" (Pressa feat. Houdini)

== See also ==
- List of murdered hip hop musicians
