= Puffy L'z =

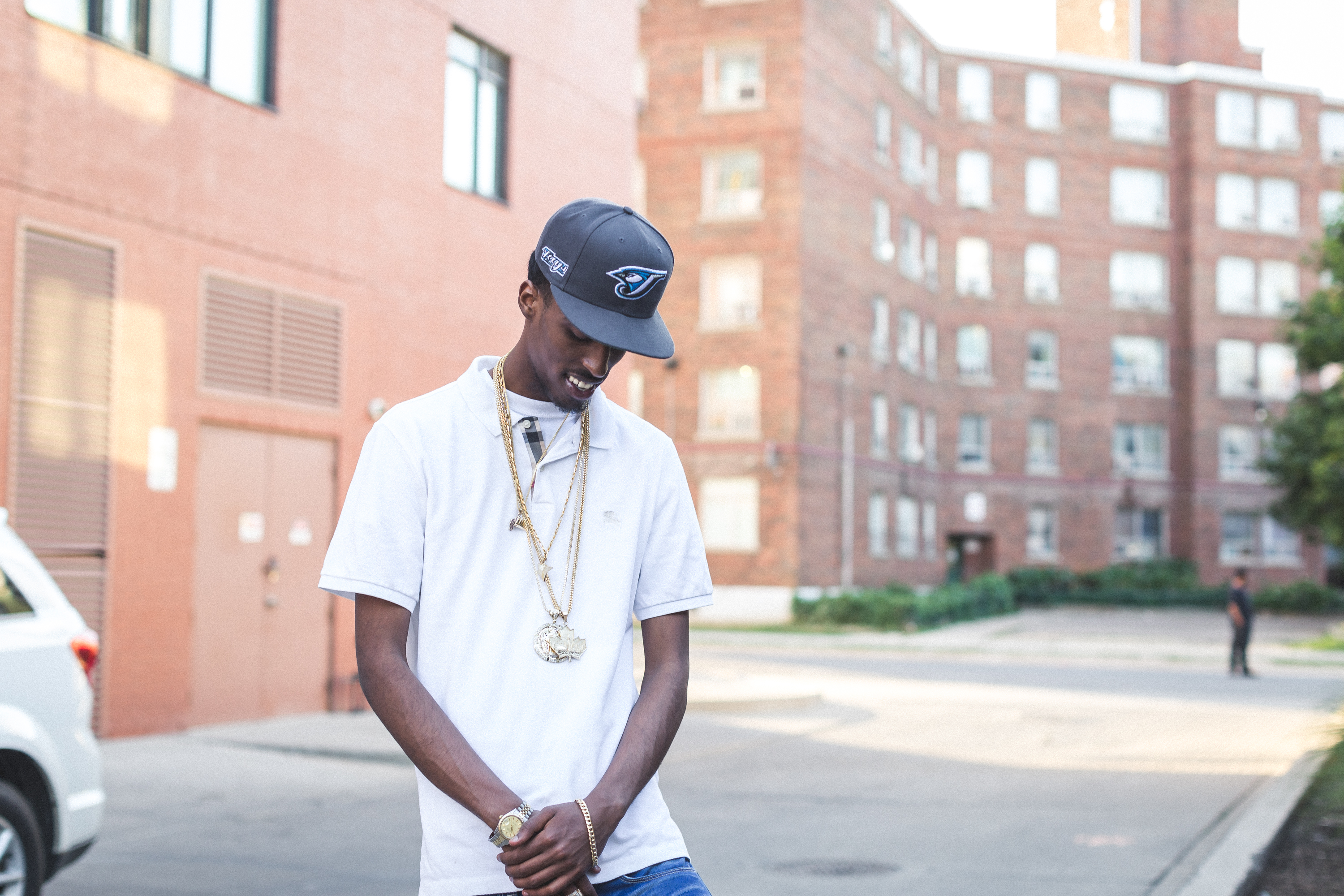
- L'z in 2016

Background information
- Born: Habib Mohamed; August 2, 1995 (age 31)
- Origin: Toronto, Ontario, Canada
- Genre: Canadian hip hop
- Occupations: Rapper; singer
- Years active: 2014–present
- Member of: Halal Gang; Full Circle
- Website: www.puffylz.com

Habib Mohamed (born August 2, 1995), better known by his stage name Puffy L'z, is a rapper and singer from Toronto, Ontario. He is of Somali descent. Puffy L'z released his debut studio album Take No L'z on July 19, 2019, and it received a 6/10 rating from Exclaim!.

== Biography ==
=== 2014–2018: Beginnings and Halal Gang ===
Puffy L’z was born and raised in Regent Park, Toronto, the biggest social housing neighborhood based in Canada. He is of Somali descent. He began rapping in 2015 and released numerous freestyles during this time.

His debut single Been Flexing was released on February 10, 2016, and amassed over 1 million views in the first year of release.

He was featured on the track SuperStar by Nafe Smallz, released on January 25, 2017. In early 2017, he performed 15 dates on Drake's Boy Meets World European Tour. He rose to fame as part of Halal Gang alongside Mustafa the Poet, Mo-G, Safe, and late rapper and long-time friend, Smoke Dawg, who was shot on Queen Street on Canada Day in 2018. As a result, Puffy L'z stopped making music for a while to mourn the death of his friend.

Puffy, alongside Halal Gang members Smoke Dawg and Prime Boys members Jay Whiss Donnie and Jimmy Prime, come together to form the supergroup "Full Circle".

=== 2019–present: Take No L'z ===
After his hiatus, Puffy L'z returned to music in early 2019. On his return he has released the single Front Gate featuring British rapper Giggs. He released his debut studio album Take No L'z on July 19, 2019, featured guest appearances from Safe, Jay Whiss, Giggs, Jay Z and Smoke Dawg. He also went on to feature on Jay Whiss's debut album Peace of Mind with the single "Valet" produced by Murda Beatz released on December 4, 2019.

== Discography ==
=== Studio albums ===
- Take No L'z

=== Compilation album ===
- NorthernSound (by 6ixBuzz)

== Filmography ==
Film and television
Year	Title	Role	Notes
2019	Remember Me, Toronto	Himself	Short film by Mustafa the Poet
