= Boy Meets World Tour =

2017 concert tour by Drake

The Boy Meets World Tour
- Tour by Drake
- Location: Europe • Oceania
- Associated album: Views; More Life
- Start date: January 28, 2017
- End date: November 20, 2017
- Legs: 2
- No. of shows: 43
- Supporting acts: Dvsn, Young Thug, Boi-1da, Pi'erre Bourne
- Box office: $55.2 million ($70.81 million in 2024 dollars)

Drake concert chronology
- Summer Sixteen Tour (2016); Boy Meets World Tour (2017); Aubrey & the Three Migos Tour (2018)

The Boy Meets World Tour was the fifth headlining tour by Canadian recording artist Drake, to support his album Views (2016), and his playlist More Life (2017). The European leg began on January 28, 2017, at the Ziggo Dome in Amsterdam and concluded at the same venue on March 29, 2017. The opening acts for the European leg were the Canadian R&B duo dvsn, along with Young Thug for the UK and Ireland concerts. An Australia and New Zealand leg began on November 3, 2017, in Auckland, New Zealand and ended in Melbourne, Australia on November 20, 2017. The opening acts for the Australian and New Zealand concerts were Boi-1da and Pi'erre Bourne, both performing DJ sets.

== Set list ==
=== Leg 1 ===
1. "Free Smoke"
2. "Trophies"
3. "Started from the Bottom"
4. "Headlines"
5. "HYFR (Hell Ya Fucking Right)"
6. "0 to 100"
7. "Keep the Family Close"
8. "9"
9. "Still Here"
10. "Child's Play"
11. "Feel No Ways"
12. "Western Road Flows"
13. "Worst Behavior"
14. "We Made It"
15. "Blessings"
16. "All Me"
17. "Versace"
18. "Pop That"
19. "Over"
20. "I'm on One"
21. "Up All Night"
22. "Miss Me"
23. "Crew Love"
24. "Successful"
25. "Hotline Bling"
26. "Hold On, We're Going Home"
27. "The Motto"
28. "Right Hand"
29. "For Free" (DJ Khaled cover)
30. "My Way"
31. "Jumpman"
32. "Work"
33. "Take Care"
34. "Too Good"
35. "Controlla"
36. "One Dance"
37. "KMT"
38. "Pop Style"
39. "Know Yourself"
40. "Energy"
41. "Fake Love"
42. "Legend"

=== Leg 2 ===
1. "Free Smoke"
2. "Trophies"
3. "Started from the Bottom"
4. "Headlines"
5. "HYFR (Hell Ya Fucking Right)"
6. "0 to 100"
7. "Worst Behavior"
8. "We Made It"
9. "Blessings"
10. "All Me"
11. "Versace"
12. "Pop That"
13. "Over"
14. "I'm on One"
15. "Up All Night"
16. "Miss Me"
17. "Crew Love"
18. "Hotline Bling"
19. "Hold On, We're Going Home"
20. "Passionfruit"
21. "Teenage Fever"
22. "The Motto"
23. "For Free"
24. "My Way"
25. "Both"
26. "Portland"
27. "Jumpman"
28. "Work" (Rihanna cover)
29. "Take Care"
30. "Too Good"
31. "Blem"
32. "Controlla"
33. "One Dance"
34. "KMT"
35. "Pop Style"
36. "Gyalchester"
37. "Know Yourself"
38. "Energy"
39. "Fake Love"
40. "Legend"

== Special acts ==
- January 28, 2017: Giggs
- January 30, 2017: Giggs, Kyla, Section Boyz
- February 1, 2017: Travis Scott, Giggs, Section Boyz
- February 4, 2017: Krept & Konan, Dave, Giggs, Kyla
- February 20, 22, 2017: Giggs
- February 23, 2017: Krept & Konan, Giggs, Jorja Smith Monkz24
- February 25, 2017: The Weeknd, Giggs
- February 26, 2017: Popcaan, Giggs
- March 7, 2017: Baka, Popcaan, Pressa
- March 9, 2017: Baka, Popcaan, Pressa
- March 12, 13, 14, 2017: Nicki Minaj, Giggs, Popcaan, dvsn
- March 20, 2017: Giggs, Skepta, Nicki Minaj, Trey Songz, Popcaan, Jorja Smith
- March 22, 23, 28, 2017: Giggs, Popcaan

== Tour dates ==
List of concerts, showing date, city, country, venue, opening acts, tickets sold, number of available tickets and amount of gross revenue
Date	City	Country	Venue	Support Act	Attendance	Gross
Europe
January 28, 2017	Amsterdam	Netherlands	Ziggo Dome	dvsn	14,287	$1,002,174
January 30, 2017	London	England	The O_{2} Arena	dvsn Young Thug	79,491	$8,186,038
February 1, 2017	London	England	The O_{2} Arena	dvsn Young Thug	79,491	$8,186,038
February 2, 2017	London	England	The O_{2} Arena	dvsn Young Thug	79,491	$8,186,038
February 4, 2017	London	England	The O_{2} Arena	dvsn Young Thug	79,491	$8,186,038
February 5, 2017	London	England	The O_{2} Arena	dvsn Young Thug	79,491	$8,186,038
February 8, 2017	Leeds	England	First Direct Arena	dvsn Young Thug	19,724	$1,846,590
February 9, 2017	Leeds	England	First Direct Arena	dvsn Young Thug	19,724	$1,846,590
February 11, 2017	Manchester	England	Manchester Arena	dvsn Young Thug	28,719	$2,802,207
February 12, 2017	Manchester	England	Manchester Arena	dvsn Young Thug	28,719	$2,802,207
February 14, 2017	London	England	The O_{2} Arena	dvsn Young Thug	32,640	$3,368,682
February 15, 2017	London	England	The O_{2} Arena	dvsn Young Thug	32,640	$3,368,682
February 17, 2017	Sheffield	England	Sheffield Arena	dvsn Young Thug	12,225	$1,221,413
February 19, 2017	Dublin	Ireland	3Arena	dvsn	24,587	$2,208,696
February 20, 2017	Dublin	Ireland	3Arena	dvsn	24,587	$2,208,696
February 22, 2017	Birmingham	England	Barclaycard Arena	dvsn	27,600	$3,125,919
February 23, 2017	Birmingham	England	Barclaycard Arena	dvsn	27,600	$3,125,919
February 25, 2017	Oberhausen	Germany	König Pilsener Arena	dvsn	9,624	$845,065
February 26, 2017	Amsterdam	Netherlands	Ziggo Dome	dvsn	11,373	$706,229
February 28, 2017	Antwerp	Belgium	Sportpaleis	dvsn	34,281	$2,002,970
March 1, 2017	Antwerp	Belgium	Sportpaleis	dvsn	34,281	$2,002,970
March 4, 2017	Stockholm	Sweden	Ericsson Globe	dvsn	13,838	$989,625
March 5, 2017	Oslo	Norway	Telenor Arena	dvsn	—	—
March 7, 2017	Copenhagen	Denmark	Royal Arena	dvsn	—	—
March 9, 2017	Berlin	Germany	Mercedes-Benz Arena	dvsn	13,747	$1,022,799
March 10, 2017	Hamburg	Germany	Barclaycard Arena	dvsn	11,119	$913,569
March 12, 2017	Paris	France	AccorHotels Arena	dvsn	37,254	$3,306,524
March 13, 2017	Paris	France	AccorHotels Arena	dvsn	37,254	$3,306,524
March 14, 2017	Paris	France	AccorHotels Arena	dvsn	37,254	$3,306,524
March 20, 2017	London	England	The O_{2} Arena	dvsn	16,392	$1,677,706
March 22, 2017	Glasgow	Scotland	SSE Hydro	—	18,925	$1,758,490
March 23, 2017	Glasgow	Scotland	SSE Hydro	—	18,925	$1,758,490
March 28, 2017	Amsterdam	Netherlands	Ziggo Dome	dvsn	21,702	$1,589,554
March 29, 2017	Amsterdam	Netherlands	Ziggo Dome	dvsn	21,702	$1,589,554
Oceania
November 3, 2017	Auckland	New Zealand	Spark Arena	—	—	—
November 4, 2017	Auckland	New Zealand	Spark Arena	—	—	—
November 7, 2017	Sydney	Australia	Qudos Bank Arena	—	—	—
November 8, 2017	Sydney	Australia	Qudos Bank Arena	—	—	—
November 10, 2017	Brisbane	Australia	Brisbane Entertainment Centre	—	13,429	$1,537,048
November 15, 2017	Sydney	Australia	Qudos Bank Arena	—	—	—
November 18, 2017	Melbourne	Australia	Rod Laver Arena	—	46,117	$5,260,698
November 19, 2017	Melbourne	Australia	Rod Laver Arena	—	46,117	$5,260,698
November 20, 2017	Melbourne	Australia	Rod Laver Arena	—	46,117	$5,260,698
Total					487,074	$45,371,996
