= Safe (musician) =

SAFE
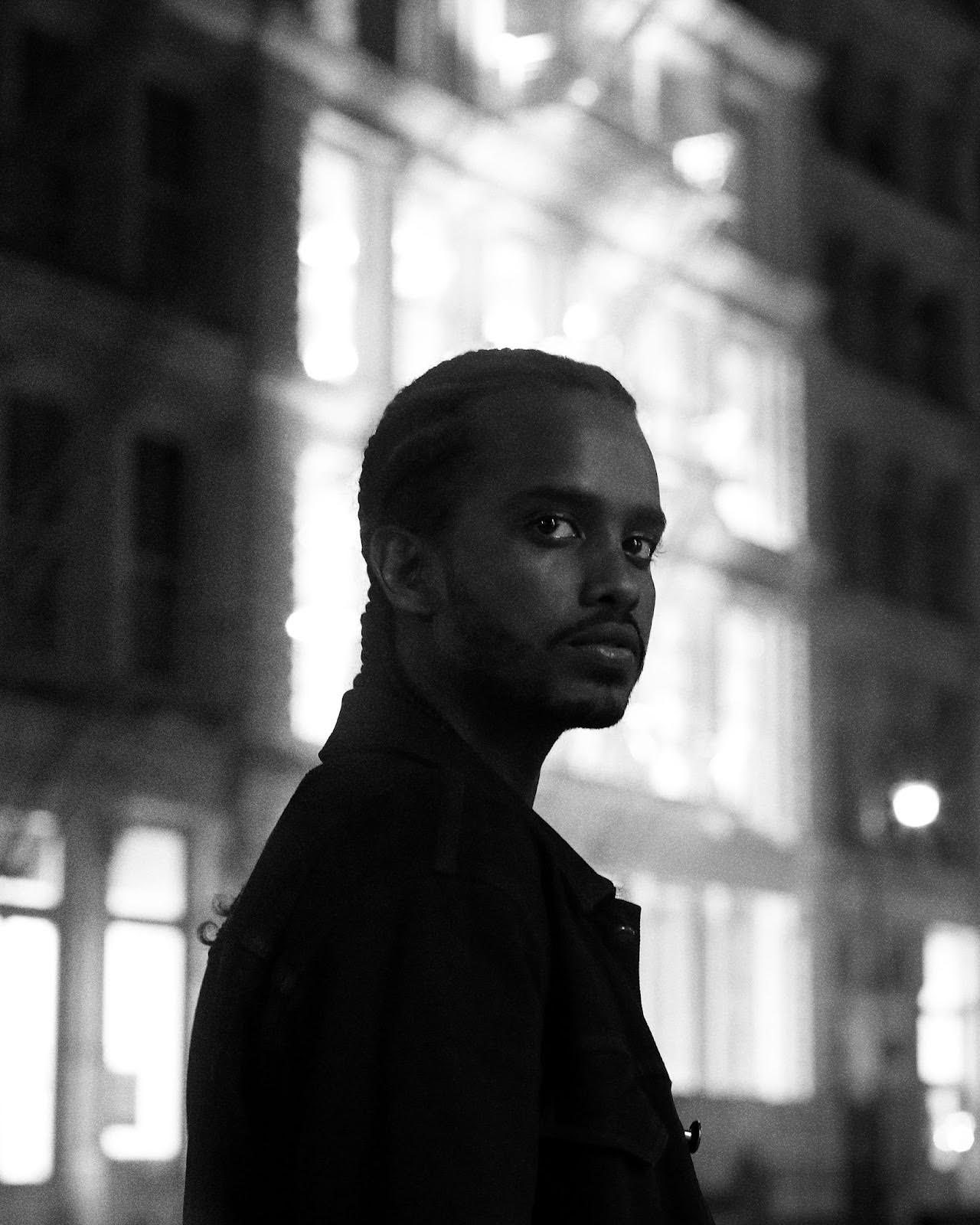

Background information
- Also known as: Bando; Bando416
- Born: Saif Musaad; 30 January 1997 (age 29); Abu Dhabi, United Arab Emirates
- Origin: Toronto, Ontario, Canada
- Genres: R&B; hip hop; trap
- Occupations: Singer; rapper; songwriter; producer
- Instrument: Vocals
- Years active: 2015–present
- Labels: Bando Recordings; RCA; Epic (former)
- Member of: Halal Gang; Full Circle
- Website: bando416.com

Saif Musaad (born 30 January 1997), professionally known as Safe (stylized as SAFE), is a singer, songwriter, and producer from Toronto, Ontario. He has collaborated with artists such as Playboi Carti, Khalid, and YG. In addition to releasing two studio albums, his song "Contagious" was featured on the Judas and the Black Messiah: The Inspired Album.

== Early life ==
Saif Musaad was born on 30 January 1997 in Abu Dhabi, United Arab Emirates, and is of Eritrean descent. His father and mother are Eritreans. He immigrated with his family to Toronto when he was two months old, and grew up in the neighborhood of The Esplanade in eastern downtown Toronto.

== Career ==
Musaad began to focus on writing lyrics and recording as early as the age of 10. When he was 18, he met Oliver El-Khatib at a video shoot for Jimmy Prime. As the manager for Drake, El-Khatib helped Musaad get a job at the OVO store in Toronto. While at OVO, El-Khatib encouraged Musaad to write and record. As a member of the Halal Gang, he collaborated with artists such as Bibi Bourelly, Ramriddlz, Eric Dingus, and Smoke Dawg. In 2015 he released "Feel", his first single on SoundCloud, receiving received 4.15 million plays over four years. The same year he released Stay Down, his first EP which also contained his single "Feel", and was selling out shows in Toronto.

Musaad moved to New York City in 2017. He continued to release singles and videos, mainly with the vibe of the Esplanade neighborhood where he grew up. His single "No Diamonds" criticized the ostentatious display of the trappings of wealth, while the video to his single "New Regime" depicted the seamy side of his hometown and his reasons for leaving. During the same period, Safe's vocals were featured on a number of other artists' tracks, including September 2018 single "Listen Closely" from fellow Canadians DVBBS, the track "Don't Pretend" from Khalid's 2019 album Free Spirit, and YG's track "Play Too Much" on his 2019 album 4Real 4Real.

Musaad released his debut studio album in 2019 on RCA Records. Titled Stay, it contained 12 tracks that were characterized as cool R&B with elements of dancehall and afrobeat. QUIN and Playboi Carti were the only featured artists on the album. In 2021 he released the single "Trap Smarter", and was featured on Judas and the Black Messiah: The Inspired Album with his single "Contagious" which he performed with Kiana Ledé. The following year he released Get Home SAFE (part 1), his second studio album through RCA Records.

== Discography ==
=== Studio albums ===
List of albums
Title	Album details	Ref(s)
Stay	Released: May 9, 2019; Label: RCA; Formats: CD, digital download	
Get Home SAFE (Part 1)	Released: February 4, 2022; Label: RCA; Formats: CD, digital download	

=== Compilation albums ===
List of albums
Title	Album details	Ref(s)
6ixUpsideDown	Released: October 19, 2018; Label: Self-released; Formats: digital download	
NorthernSound	Released: December 13, 2019; Label: Self-released; Formats: digital download	
SAFE & Sound	Released: June 10, 2023; Label: Self-released; Formats: digital download	

=== Extended plays ===
List of albums
Title	Album details	Ref(s)
Stay Down	Released: 2015; Label: Self-released; Formats: digital download	
