= List of Akan people =

The list of Akan people includes notable individuals of Akan meta-ethnicity and ancestry; the Akan people who are also referred to as (Akan: Akanfo) are a meta-ethnicity and Potou–Tano Kwa ethno-linguistic group that are indigenously located on the Ashantiland peninsula near the equator precisely at the "centre of the Earth".

== Academic figures and inventors ==
Academic figures and inventors
Name	Born	Died	Notability	Ref.	
Francis Allotey	9 August 1932	2 November 2017 (aged 85)	Internationally respected mathematical physicist; known for the "Allotey Formalism" which arose from his work on soft X-ray spectroscopy		Kwame Anthony Appiah Lawrence Henry Yaw Ofosu-Appiah Marcus Garvey Kwame Nkrumah Simone Gbagbo in 2006 Kouame K. Klebair in 2010
Nat Quansah		—	Doctorate in philosophy; was awarded the Goldman Environmental Prize		Kwame Anthony Appiah Lawrence Henry Yaw Ofosu-Appiah Marcus Garvey Kwame Nkrumah Simone Gbagbo in 2006 Kouame K. Klebair in 2010
Lawrence Henry Yaw Ofosu-Appiah	18 March 1920	1 June 1990 (aged 70)	Academic; director of the Encyclopedia Africana		Kwame Anthony Appiah Lawrence Henry Yaw Ofosu-Appiah Marcus Garvey Kwame Nkrumah Simone Gbagbo in 2006 Kouame K. Klebair in 2010
Kwame Anthony Appiah	8 May 1954	—	Philosopher, cultural theorist, and novelist whose interests include political and moral theory, the philosophy of language and mind, and African intellectual history		Kwame Anthony Appiah Lawrence Henry Yaw Ofosu-Appiah Marcus Garvey Kwame Nkrumah Simone Gbagbo in 2006 Kouame K. Klebair in 2010
Patrick Awuah, Jr.	c. 1965 (age 60–61)	—	Program Manager for Microsoft; spearheaded the development of dial-up internetworking technologies at Microsoft		Kwame Anthony Appiah Lawrence Henry Yaw Ofosu-Appiah Marcus Garvey Kwame Nkrumah Simone Gbagbo in 2006 Kouame K. Klebair in 2010
Marcus Garvey	17 August 1887	10 June 1940 (aged 52)	Academic publisher, journalist, and orator		Kwame Anthony Appiah Lawrence Henry Yaw Ofosu-Appiah Marcus Garvey Kwame Nkrumah Simone Gbagbo in 2006 Kouame K. Klebair in 2010
Kofi Abrefa Busia	11 July 1913	28 August 1978 (aged 65)	Academic and politician; studied at University College, Oxford; took BA (Hons) in Philosophy, Politics and Economics (MA) and a DPhil in social anthropology		Kwame Anthony Appiah Lawrence Henry Yaw Ofosu-Appiah Marcus Garvey Kwame Nkrumah Simone Gbagbo in 2006 Kouame K. Klebair in 2010
J. B. Danquah	c. December 1895	4 February 1965 (aged 69–70)	Scholar, historian, philosopher and lawyer; studied at University of London; wrote The Akan Doctrine of God (1944)		Kwame Anthony Appiah Lawrence Henry Yaw Ofosu-Appiah Marcus Garvey Kwame Nkrumah Simone Gbagbo in 2006 Kouame K. Klebair in 2010
Kwame Nkrumah	21 September 1909	27 April 1972 (aged 62)	Lecturer; influential 20th-century advocate of Pan-Africanism; awarded the Lenin Peace Prize		Kwame Anthony Appiah Lawrence Henry Yaw Ofosu-Appiah Marcus Garvey Kwame Nkrumah Simone Gbagbo in 2006 Kouame K. Klebair in 2010
Simone Gbagbo	20 June 1949	—	Historian, politician and former first lady of Ivory Coast; cofounded the Ivorian Popular Front with her husband, former president Laurent Gbagbo, in 1982		Kwame Anthony Appiah Lawrence Henry Yaw Ofosu-Appiah Marcus Garvey Kwame Nkrumah Simone Gbagbo in 2006 Kouame K. Klebair in 2010

== Architects and designers ==
Architects and designers
Name	Born	Died	Notability	Ref.	
David Adjaye	c. September 1966 (age 60)	—	Architect; received OBE; selected to design the $500 million National Museum of African American History and Culture, part of the Smithsonian in Washington, D.C., planned to open in 2015		Ozwald Boateng
Ozwald Boateng	28 February 1967	—	Fashion designer; received OBE; known for his trademark twist on classic tailoring and bespoke style; CEO of the fashion design label Ozwald Boateng		Ozwald Boateng
Adrien Sauvage	30 May 1983	—	Fashion designer, director and photographer; CEO of the fashion design label House A. Sauvage		Ozwald Boateng

== Businesspersons and entrepreneurs ==
Businesspersons and entrepreneurs
sam brefo	17/11/62	age 62	Agro business	Ref.uk residence	
Paul Cuffee	17 January 1759	9 September 1817 (aged 58)	Quaker and businessman; built a lucrative shipping empire		Paul Cuffee Adam Afriyie Paul Boateng
Paa Kwesi Nduom	15 February 1953	—	Businessman, business consultant and politician; received Bachelor of Arts (Economics) degree, Master's degree in Management and PhD (Service Delivery Systems) at the University of Wisconsin–Milwaukee		Paul Cuffee Adam Afriyie Paul Boateng
Adam Afriyie	4 August 1965	—	Businessman and politician; self-made multi-millionaire; worth an estimated £100 million (£100,000,000+); Afriyie is chairman of Connect Support Services, an IT support company; owned two-thirds of DeHavilland; regional finalist in the 2003 Ernst and Young Entrepreneur of the Year awards; Governor of the Museum of London; trustee of the Museum in Docklands; a director of Policy Exchange		Paul Cuffee Adam Afriyie Paul Boateng
Sam E. Jonah	19 November 1949	—	Businessman; received KBE; Executive chairman of Jonah Capital, equity fund; previously Corporate President of AngloGold Ashanti		Paul Cuffee Adam Afriyie Paul Boateng
Paul Boateng	14 June 1951	—	Businessman and Lord; currently a non-executive Director of Aegis Defence Services, a private military company, private security company, and military and risk management company		Paul Cuffee Adam Afriyie Paul Boateng
Dentaa Amoateng	c. 1983 (age 42–43)	—	Businesswoman, award-winning entrepreneur, general manager and sports agent		Paul Cuffee Adam Afriyie Paul Boateng
Menaye Donkor	20 March 1981	—	Businesswoman, entrepreneur, and philanthropist; received BBA, BBusSci, MBA, and MMR degrees in marketing and business marketing at York University		Paul Cuffee Adam Afriyie Paul Boateng

=== Economists and bankers ===
Economists and bankers
Name	Born	Died	Notability	Ref.	
Kwesi Nyantakyi		—	Banker, lawyer and football administrator		Kofi Annan
Kwesi Amissah-Arthur	29 April 1951	—	Economist, academician and politician		Kofi Annan
Kofi Annan	8 April 1938	18 August 2018	Economist, diplomat, Secretary-General of the United Nations and Nobel laureate		Kofi Annan
Edward S. Ayensu		—	Economist and scientist; studied the biological sciences at the University of London; formerly director and senior scientist at the Smithsonian Institution; international development advisor on science, technology and economic development; member of the board of trustees of the UN University for Peace; member of the advisory board of the Sustainable Forestry Management Limited; has held several important positions globally, such as chairman of the Inspection Panel of the World Bank and secretary-general of the International Union of Biological Sciences; founding chairman of the African Biosciences Network; wrote Ashanti Gold (1997)		Kofi Annan
John Atta Mills	21 July 1944	24 July 2012 (aged 68)	Economist, tax advisor and law professor; received LLM at London School of Economics and Political Science		Kofi Annan
Charles Konan Banny	11 November 1942	—	Economist, banker, former governor of the Central Bank of West African States, aka BCEAO; former prime minister of Ivory Coast; former candidate for the 2015 presidential election		Kofi Annan

== Folklore ==
Folklore
Name	Born	Died	Notability	Ref.	
Okomfo Anokye	c. 1635	c. 1717 (aged 81–82)	Legendary Akan figure best known as the wizard featured in the Akan Kingdom of Ashanti; priest, statesman and lawgiver; occupies a Merlin-like position in Akan history; co-founder of the Akan Kingdom of Ashanti and helped establish its constitution, laws, and customs		Okomfo Anokye

== Judges and lawyers ==
Judges and lawyers
Name	Born	Died	Notability	Ref.	
Joyce Bamford-Addo	26 March 1937	—	Speaker and Supreme Court Judge		Joyce Bamford-Addo
Edward Akufo-Addo	26 June 1906	17 July 1979 (aged 73)	Lawyer, chief justice and politician; studied mathematics, politics and philosophy at St Peter's College, Oxford		Joyce Bamford-Addo
Nana Akufo-Addo	29 March 1944	—	Lawyer and economist with international law firm Coudert Brothers; studied at City Law School (Inns of Court School of Law)		Joyce Bamford-Addo
John Kufuor	8 December 1938	—	Lawyer and businessman; studied at Prempeh College, Lincoln's Inn, Exeter College, and University of Oxford; CEO of Kufuor Foundation		Joyce Bamford-Addo
John Banks Elliott	9 February 1917	18 July 2018 (aged 101)	Ambassador Extraordinary and Plenipotentiary		Joyce Bamford-Addo

== Media ==
=== Actors and actresses ===
Actors and actresses
Name	Born	Died	Notability	Ref.	
Vanessa L. Williams	18 March 1963	—			Vanessa Williams Boris Kodjoe Idris Elba Majid Michel Van Vicker Freema Agyeman
Cynthia Addai-Robinson		—	Actress, Colombiana and in Star Trek Into Darkness		Vanessa Williams Boris Kodjoe Idris Elba Majid Michel Van Vicker Freema Agyeman
Peter Mensah	27 August 1959	—	Actor, Avatar, 300, Hidalgo, Tears of the Sun, Jason X, Harvard Man, Bless the Child and The Incredible Hulk		Vanessa Williams Boris Kodjoe Idris Elba Majid Michel Van Vicker Freema Agyeman
Boris Kodjoe	8 March 1973	—	Actor, Resident Evil: Afterlife and Resident Evil: Retribution		Vanessa Williams Boris Kodjoe Idris Elba Majid Michel Van Vicker Freema Agyeman
Idris Elba	6 September 1972	—	Actor, Prometheus, Pacific Rim and Thor: The Dark World		Vanessa Williams Boris Kodjoe Idris Elba Majid Michel Van Vicker Freema Agyeman
Majid Michel	22 September 1980	—			Vanessa Williams Boris Kodjoe Idris Elba Majid Michel Van Vicker Freema Agyeman
Nadia Buari	21 November 1982	—			Vanessa Williams Boris Kodjoe Idris Elba Majid Michel Van Vicker Freema Agyeman
Jackie Appiah	5 December 1983	—	Award-winning actress of the Africa Movie Academy Awards		Vanessa Williams Boris Kodjoe Idris Elba Majid Michel Van Vicker Freema Agyeman
Van Vicker	1 August 1977	—			Vanessa Williams Boris Kodjoe Idris Elba Majid Michel Van Vicker Freema Agyeman
Freema Agyeman	20 March 1979	—			Vanessa Williams Boris Kodjoe Idris Elba Majid Michel Van Vicker Freema Agyeman
Yvonne Nelson	12 November 1985	—			Vanessa Williams Boris Kodjoe Idris Elba Majid Michel Van Vicker Freema Agyeman
Juliet Ibrahim Safo	3 March 1986	—			Vanessa Williams Boris Kodjoe Idris Elba Majid Michel Van Vicker Freema Agyeman
Holly Quin-Ankrah	c. 1987 (age 38–39)	—			Vanessa Williams Boris Kodjoe Idris Elba Majid Michel Van Vicker Freema Agyeman
Adjoa Andoh	14 January 1963	—			Vanessa Williams Boris Kodjoe Idris Elba Majid Michel Van Vicker Freema Agyeman

=== Authors and novelists ===
Authors and novelists
Name	Born	Died	Notability	Ref.	
J. E. Casely Hayford	29 September 1866	11 August 1930 (aged 63)	Author, editor, journalist, lawyer, educator, and politician; awarded MBE		J. E. Casely Hayford
Anton Wilhelm Amo	c. 1703	c. 1759 (aged 55–56)	Philosopher, novelist, and educator at the universities of Halle and Jena; was treated as a member of the family of Anthony Ulrich, Duke of Brunswick-Wolfenbüttel; first African known to have attended a European university		J. E. Casely Hayford
Ottobah Cugoano	c. 1757	c. 1791 (aged 33–34)	Abolitionist, philosopher, and author		J. E. Casely Hayford

=== Filmmakers ===
Filmmakers
Name	Born	Died	Notability	Ref.	
Shirley Frimpong-Manso	c. 1977 (age 48–49)	—	Film director, screenwriter, and film producer; founder and CEO of the film, television, and advertising production company Sparrow Productions; received the "Best Director" at the 2010 Africa Movie Academy Awards		Shirley Frimpong-Manso Leila Djansi
Leila Djansi	17 July 1981	—	Filmmaker; was awarded a 2009 WorldFest-Houston International Film Festival Platinum Award, received three 2010 Africa Movie Academy Awards and was nominated for 11 Africa Movie Academy Awards for the film Sinking Sands; in 2011, was presented with the Britannia Awards (BAFTA/LA) Pan African Film Festival Choice Award		Shirley Frimpong-Manso Leila Djansi
Lydia Forson	c. 1984 (age 41–42)	—	Award winning screenwriter, film producer and actress; received the prestigious Africa Movie Academy Awards for "Best Actress in a Leading Role" in 2010		Shirley Frimpong-Manso Leila Djansi
Akissi Delta	5 March 1960	—	Actress; producer of Ma famille (My family), one of the most successful TV series in French-speaking Africa over the last decade		Shirley Frimpong-Manso Leila Djansi

=== Journalists ===
Journalists
Name	Born	Died	Notability	Ref.	
Anas Aremeyaw Anas		—	Investigative journalist; famous for utilizing his anonymity as a tool in his investigation arsenal (very few people have seen his face); a multimedia journalist who specializes in print media and documentary; focuses on issues of human rights and anti-corruption in sub-Saharan Africa		Samia Yaba Nkrumah
Gamal Nkrumah	c. 1959 (age 66–67)	—	Journalist; editor of Al Ahram Weekly newspaper; received his doctorate in political science from the School of Oriental and African Studies; initially worked as a political journalist at Al-Ahram Weekly		Samia Yaba Nkrumah
Afua Hirsch		—	Journalist, barrister and human rights development worker; West Africa correspondent for the newspaper The Guardian		Samia Yaba Nkrumah
Samia Yaba Nkrumah	23 June 1960	—	Journalist and politician; completed her studies at the School of Oriental and African Studies of the University of London, where she received her master's degree		Samia Yaba Nkrumah
Ron Claiborne	28 February 1967	—	Journalist and correspondent for ABC News, he is the current "more news reporter" for the weekend edition of Good Morning America		

=== Musicians ===
Musicians
Name	Born	Died	Notability	Ref.	
Rhian Afua Benson	10 January 1977	—	Soul and jazz singer and songwriter		Sarkodie Rhian Afua Benson Efya Fuse ODG Richie Mensah Meiway
Sarkodie	10 July 1985	—	Award-winning hiplife and hip hop recording artist, entertainer, and brand ambassador; raps in Akan language; received the BET Awards for "Best International Act Africa" in 2012; considered one of the major proponents of the Azonto genre and dance; has a large fan base in Africa		Sarkodie Rhian Afua Benson Efya Fuse ODG Richie Mensah Meiway
Bisa Kdei	19 March 1986	—	Afrobeats and highlife musician and record producer;		Sarkodie Rhian Afua Benson Efya Fuse ODG Richie Mensah Meiway
Efya	10 April 1987	—	Award-winning neo soul vocalist, songwriter, and performer		Sarkodie Rhian Afua Benson Efya Fuse ODG Richie Mensah Meiway
Richie Mensah	17 May 1986	—	Award-winning hiplife singer-songwriter, record producer, and record executive of Lynx Entertainment record label		Sarkodie Rhian Afua Benson Efya Fuse ODG Richie Mensah Meiway
Reggie Rockstone	4 November 1964	—	Rapper and pioneer of the hiplife music genre; raps in Akan language; won the Kora Award for the "Best African Video" in 2004		Sarkodie Rhian Afua Benson Efya Fuse ODG Richie Mensah Meiway
Fuse ODG	c. 1988 (age 37–38)	—	Award-winning musician; smash-hit singles include "Azonto", "Antenna", and "Million Pound Girl"		Sarkodie Rhian Afua Benson Efya Fuse ODG Richie Mensah Meiway
Meiway	17 March 1962	—	Rose to fame in the early 1990s when he created and popularized Zoblazo music; nicknamed Professor Awolowoh or the Genius of Kpalèzou; known for his smash hit "Miss Lolo" from the 2001 album Eternel (700% Zoblazo)		Sarkodie Rhian Afua Benson Efya Fuse ODG Richie Mensah Meiway
Kuami Eugene	1 February 1997	-	Ghanaian Highlife and Afrobeats musician		
Ofori Amponsah	2 March 1974	-	Ghanaian Highlife musician, famously known for songs 'Emmanuella' and 'Otoolege'		
Gyakie	16 December 1999	-	R&B and afro-fusion singer		
Kofi Kinaata	15 April 1990	-	Musician and songwriter		
Daddy Lumba	29 September 1964	-	Legendary Ghanaian musician, widely regarded as one of the best Highlife musicians ever		

=== Television presenters ===
Television presenters
Name	Born	Died	Notability	Ref.	
Deborah Owusu-Bonsu	25 August 1984	—	Television presenter and academic		Omenaa Mensah Reggie Yates
Ama K. Abebrese	3 May 1980	—	Television presenter; won the Africa Movie Academy Award for "Best Actress in a Leading Role" in 2011		Omenaa Mensah Reggie Yates
Sonia Ibrahim		—	Television presenter		Omenaa Mensah Reggie Yates
Omenaa Mensah	26 July 1979	—	Television presenter, weather forecaster and economist		Omenaa Mensah Reggie Yates
Reggie Yates	31 May 1983	—	Television presenter		Omenaa Mensah Reggie Yates

== Monarchs ==
Monarchs
Name	Born	Died	Notability	Ref.	
Osei Tutu I	c. 1660	c. 1717 (aged 56–57)	King; credited with founding the great Akan Kingdom of Ashanti		Akan Kingdom of Ashanti King Osei Tutu II
Opoku Ware I	c. 1700	c. 1750 (aged 49–50)	King; credited with being the "empire builder" of the Akan Kingdom of Ashanti during his reign, which lasted from 1720 or as early as 1718		Akan Kingdom of Ashanti King Osei Tutu II
Queen Pokou	c. 1750-1760	-	Queen; niece of Osei Kofi Tutu I and founder of the Baoule People I		Akan Kingdom of Ashanti King Osei Tutu II
Prempeh I	18 December 1870	12 May 1931 (aged 60)	King; ruled the Akan Kingdom of Ashanti from 26 March 1888 until 12 May 1931; known for fighting an Akan Kingdom of Ashanti war against Britain in 1893		Akan Kingdom of Ashanti King Osei Tutu II
Prempeh II	c. 1892	27 May 1970 (aged 77–78)	King; by name, is in direct succession to King Prempeh I		Akan Kingdom of Ashanti King Osei Tutu II
Opoku Ware II	30 November 1919	26 February 1999 (aged 79)	King; by name, is in direct succession to King Opoku Ware I		Akan Kingdom of Ashanti King Osei Tutu II
Osei Tutu II	6 May 1950	—	King; by name, is in direct succession to the founder of the Akan Kingdom of Ashanti, King Osei Tutu I		

== Physicians ==
Physicians
Name	Born	Died	Notability	Ref.	
Kwabena Frimpong-Boateng	c. 1950 (age 75–76)	—	Physician and cardiothoracic surgeon; first black African (sub-Saharan Africa) to perform a heart transplant		Jacob Kwakye-Maafo Félix Houphouët-Boigny at the White House in 1962
Kwame Addo-Kufuor	14 July 1940	—	Physician and politician; attended UCL Medical School, graduating with a degree in medicine from the University of Cambridge; obtained his post-graduate degree from Middlesex Medical School Hospital		Jacob Kwakye-Maafo Félix Houphouët-Boigny at the White House in 1962
Jacob Kwakye-Maafo	c. 1940 (age 85–86)	—	Physician and surgeon specializing in obstetrics and gynaecology		Jacob Kwakye-Maafo Félix Houphouët-Boigny at the White House in 1962
Félix Houphouët-Boigny	18 October 1905	7 December 1993 (aged 88)	First President of Ivory Coast (1960 to 1993), serving for more than three decades until his death		Jacob Kwakye-Maafo Félix Houphouët-Boigny at the White House in 1962

== Models ==
Name	Born	Died	Notability	Ref.
Olivia Yacé	8 January 1998		Miss Côte d'Ivoire 2021 and Second runner-up Miss World 2021	

== Sports ==
=== American footballers ===
American footballers
Name	Born	Died	Notability	Ref.	
Ebenezer Ekuban	29 May 1976	—	Defensive end; originally drafted by the Dallas Cowboys in the first round (20th overall) of the 1999 NFL draft, before going to play for the Cleveland Browns and the Denver Broncos in the National Football League (NFL)		Jon Asamoah Charlie Peprah Joseph Addai Nyan Boateng
Ezekiel Ansah	29 May 1989	—	Defensive end for the Detroit Lions in the National Football League (NFL); drafted by the Detroit Lions in the first round (5th overall) of the 2013 NFL draft		Jon Asamoah Charlie Peprah Joseph Addai Nyan Boateng
Jon Asamoah	21 July 1988	—	Offensive guard for the Kansas City Chiefs in the National Football League (NFL); considered one of the top interior offensive linemen for the 2010 NFL draft		Jon Asamoah Charlie Peprah Joseph Addai Nyan Boateng
Charlie Peprah	24 February 1983	—	Safety; drafted by the New York Giants in the fifth round of the 2006 NFL draft; played for the Green Bay Packers 2006–2008, the Atlanta Falcons in 2009, the Green Bay Packers again 2010–2011, and the Dallas Cowboys in the National Football League (NFL)		Jon Asamoah Charlie Peprah Joseph Addai Nyan Boateng
Nyan Boateng	23 February 1987	—	Wide receiver formally of the New York Giants in the National Football League (NFL)		Jon Asamoah Charlie Peprah Joseph Addai Nyan Boateng
Joseph Addai	3 May 1983	—	Running back; selected in the first round (30th overall) of the 2006 NFL draft by the Indianapolis Colts; played for the Colts for six seasons in the NFL; played for the New England Patriots in the NFL		Jon Asamoah Charlie Peprah Joseph Addai Nyan Boateng
Clint Sintim	21 February 1986	—	Linebacker; drafted by the New York Giants in the second round of the 2009 NFL draft in the NFL		Jon Asamoah Charlie Peprah Joseph Addai Nyan Boateng

=== Canadian footballers ===
Skiers
Name	Born	Died	Notability	Ref.
Kennedy Nkeyasen	7 April 1976	—	Free safety; converted from running back) with the Saskatchewan Roughriders of the Canadian Football League (CFL)	

=== Rugby League players ===
Rugby league players
Name	Born	Died	Notability	Ref.	
Dennis Tuffour	17 February 1989	—	Professional rugby league footballer for Doncaster and Hull F.C. in the Super League		Matty Blythe
Matty Blythe	20 November 1988	—	Professional rugby league footballer and second-row for the Warrington Wolves and the Bradford Bulls in the Super League		Matty Blythe

=== Basketball players ===
Basketball players
Name	Born	Died	Notability	Ref.	
Pops Mensah-Bonsu	7 September 1983	—	In the language Akan (Twi), Mensah-Bonsu's name means King (Nana) Father (Papa) Thursday-Born (Yaw) Third Son (Mensah) Whale (Bonsu) in the Akan names system; has suggested in interviews that his family earned the surname when an ancestor slew a whale; plays for Galatasaray Liv Hospital of the Turkish Basketball League; has a number of nicknames, including "King Whale Killer" and "Big Daddy", popularized by Toronto play-by-play announcer Matt Devlin and other commentators		Pops Mensah-Bonsu
Eric Boateng	20 November 1985	—	Formally signed with the Los Angeles Lakers; currently plays for La Unión of the LNB		Pops Mensah-Bonsu

=== Boxers ===
Boxers
Name	Born	Died	Notability	Ref.	
Jack Johnson (boxer)	31 March 1878	10 June 1946 (aged 68)	World Heavyweight Boxing Champion (1908–1915)		Jack Johnson
Michael Ebo Danquah		—	World Boxing Council (WBC) International Light Flyweight Title Champion		Jack Johnson

=== Combat sports ===
Combat sports
Name	Born	Died	Notability	Ref.	
Kofi Kingston	14 August 1981	—	Professional wrestler and four time Intercontinental Champion		Kofi Kingston
Joey Ansah	24 November 1982	—	Martial artist in tae kwon do and capoeira; actor in martial arts films The Bourne Ultimatum and Street Fighter: Legacy		Kofi Kingston
Prince Nana	c. 1977 (age 48–49)	—	Professional wrestler and member of Ring of Honor professional wrestling promotion		Kofi Kingston

=== Footballers ===
Footballers
Name	Born	Died	Notability	Ref.	
Kim Grant	25 September 1972	—	Involved in professional association football for over 18 years, playing in Europe and Asia leagues		Kevin-Prince Boateng Phil Ofosu-Ayeh Curtis Obeng Arthur Wharton Derek Asamoah Kwadwo Asamoah Yaw Ihle Amankwah Asamoah Gyan
Tony Yeboah	6 June 1966	—	Considered one of the most prominent and prolific goal scorers in African football history		Kevin-Prince Boateng Phil Ofosu-Ayeh Curtis Obeng Arthur Wharton Derek Asamoah Kwadwo Asamoah Yaw Ihle Amankwah Asamoah Gyan
Arthur Wharton	28 October 1865	13 December 1930 (aged 65)	First black professional association football player in the world		Kevin-Prince Boateng Phil Ofosu-Ayeh Curtis Obeng Arthur Wharton Derek Asamoah Kwadwo Asamoah Yaw Ihle Amankwah Asamoah Gyan
Michael Essien	3 December 1982	—	In 2005, became the most expensive African footballer in history, with a fee of £24.4 million; often referred to as the 'Bison' for his tough tackling style, boundless energy and physical presence on the association football pitch		Kevin-Prince Boateng Phil Ofosu-Ayeh Curtis Obeng Arthur Wharton Derek Asamoah Kwadwo Asamoah Yaw Ihle Amankwah Asamoah Gyan
Samuel Kuffour	3 September 1976	—	Professional association football defender; known for his time with Bayern Munich, whom he represented for over a decade, winning a total of 17 major titles, and playing in nearly 250 official matches		Kevin-Prince Boateng Phil Ofosu-Ayeh Curtis Obeng Arthur Wharton Derek Asamoah Kwadwo Asamoah Yaw Ihle Amankwah Asamoah Gyan
John Mensah	29 November 1982	—	Professional association football defender; nicknamed the 'Rock of Gibraltar'; currently with Eskilstuna in the Allsvenskan		Kevin-Prince Boateng Phil Ofosu-Ayeh Curtis Obeng Arthur Wharton Derek Asamoah Kwadwo Asamoah Yaw Ihle Amankwah Asamoah Gyan
Kevin-Prince Boateng	6 March 1987	—	Professional association football box-to-box midfielder and defensive midfielder		Kevin-Prince Boateng Phil Ofosu-Ayeh Curtis Obeng Arthur Wharton Derek Asamoah Kwadwo Asamoah Yaw Ihle Amankwah Asamoah Gyan
Kwadwo Asamoah	9 December 1988	—	Ranked as the 27th best footballer in the world by Bloomberg in 2013		Kevin-Prince Boateng Phil Ofosu-Ayeh Curtis Obeng Arthur Wharton Derek Asamoah Kwadwo Asamoah Yaw Ihle Amankwah Asamoah Gyan
Asamoah Gyan	22 November 1985	—	Goal scorer; nominated for FIFA Ballon d'Or		Kevin-Prince Boateng Phil Ofosu-Ayeh Curtis Obeng Arthur Wharton Derek Asamoah Kwadwo Asamoah Yaw Ihle Amankwah Asamoah Gyan
Quincy Owusu-Abeyie	15 April 1986	—	Known for his footspeed; considered one of the most skillful forwards; third fastest professional association football player in the world		Kevin-Prince Boateng Phil Ofosu-Ayeh Curtis Obeng Arthur Wharton Derek Asamoah Kwadwo Asamoah Yaw Ihle Amankwah Asamoah Gyan
Simon Adingra	1 January 2002	—	Professional association football winger, won Best Young Player at 2023 Africa Cup of Nations, assisting twice in the final.		Kevin-Prince Boateng Phil Ofosu-Ayeh Curtis Obeng Arthur Wharton Derek Asamoah Kwadwo Asamoah Yaw Ihle Amankwah Asamoah Gyan

=== Football managers ===
Football managers
Name	Born	Died	Notability	Ref.	
Charles Gyamfi	c. 1929 (age 96–97)	—	Manager and head coach; football coaching career highlights include winning the Africa Cup of Nations three times, making him the most successful coach in Africa Cup of Nations history		Chris Hughton
Fred Osam-Duodu		—	Manager and head coach; football coaching career highlights include winning the Africa Cup of Nations		Chris Hughton
James Kwesi Appiah	9 August 1959	—	Manager and head coach; received technical training from Manchester City in the Premier League		Chris Hughton
Maxwell Konadu	4 December 1972	—	Manager and head coach; from 2011 to 2012, served as assistant manager and then head coach for Asante Kotoko and the African club of the 20th century		Chris Hughton
Chris Hughton	11 December 1958	—	Football manager; from 1993 to 2007, served as head coach and then assistant manager for Tottenham Hotspur; joined Newcastle United as first team head coach in 2008; following their relegation, became caretaker manager; led Newcastle United back to the Premier League in his first season in charge, along the way breaking a number of records and securing the permanent managerial position; managed Birmingham City for one season, leading them to 4th place in the league, before joining Norwich City in the Premier League in June 2012		Chris Hughton

=== Skiers ===
Skiers
Name	Born	Died	Notability	Ref.
Kwame Nkrumah-Acheampong	19 December 1974	—	Alpine skier nicknamed "The Snow Leopard"; competed at the 2010 Winter Olympics	

=== Track ===
- Blessing Afrifah (born 2003), Israeli Olympic sprinter

== Warriors and revolutionary leaders ==
Warriors
Name	Born	Died	Notability	Ref.
Yaa Asantewaa	c. 1840	17 October 1921 (aged 80–81)	Queen mother of the Akan Kingdom of Ashanti; led the Akan Kingdom rebellion known as the "War of the Golden Stool" against Britain in 1900	
Queen Nanny	c. 1685	c. 1755 (aged 69–70)	Ashanti Queen Nanny or Nana Akua (from "Nana", a title for a queen or king); leader in the eighteenth century; historical documents refer to her as the "rebels (sic) old obeah/"obayie" woman", and they legally grant "Nanny and the people now residing with her and their heirs Nanny Town"	
Cuffy	c. 1729	c. 1763 (aged 33–34)	Cuffy (Kofi Badu) led the Berbice Slave Uprising in present day Guyana, leading more than 2,500 troops against the Dutch colonial regime	
Denmark Vesey	c. 1767	2 July 1822 (aged 54–55)	Planned a rebellion in 1822; regarded as a hero with the Denmark Vesey House, named a National Historic Landmark	
Nat Turner	2 October 1800	11 November 1831 (aged 31)	Led a rebellion that resulted in 55 Caucasoid deaths; his grandmother was of Akan origin	
Harriet Tubman			Oral traditions of Harriet Tubman's family said she was of Akan Ashanti people descent	

=== Military personnel ===
Military personnel
Name	Born	Died	Notability	Ref.
Akwasi Afrifa	24 April 1936	26 June 1979 (aged 43)	Brigadier; attended the Mons Officer Cadet School; completed officer training at the Royal Military Academy	
Ignatius Acheampong	23 September 1931	16 June 1979 (aged 47)	General during the twentieth century	
Fred Akuffo	21 March 1937	26 June 1979 (aged 42)	Lieutenant General; trained at the Royal Military Academy, receiving his commission; attended the National Defence College	
