= T.I.N.A. (album) =

- Standard edition album cover. The deluxe edition has a different grey-coloured background.

Studio album by Fuse ODG
- Released: 3 November 2014
- Recorded: 2011–2014
- Genre: Afrobeats
- Length: 44:12 (standard); 60:03 (deluxe)
- Label: 3 Beat
- Producers: Fuse ODG; KillBeatz; Di Genius; Maleek Berry; Arjun Haze; Romeo Miller; Theo Davis; Platinum Toxx; Salim Sayed; Tinashe Muyambo; Wyclef Jean; Rymez

Fuse ODG chronology
The Buzz (2012)	T.I.N.A. (2014)	New Africa Nation (2019)

Singles from T.I.N.A.
- 1. "Azonto" Released: 27 October 2011; 2. "Antenna" Released: 12 August 2012; 3. "Million Pound Girl (Badder Than Bad)" Released: 27 December 2013; 4. "Dangerous Love" Released: 16 May 2014; 5. "T.I.N.A." Released: 17 October 2014; 6. "Thinking About U" Released: 2 January 2015

T.I.N.A. (an acronym for This Is New Africa) is the debut studio album by Ghanaian-English Afrobeats recording artist Fuse ODG, released on 3 November 2014 through 3 Beat Records.

== Singles ==
The album's lead single "Azonto", featuring Itz Tiffany, was released on 27 October 2011, and was re-released in the United Kingdom on 29 September 2013. The song was a commercial success, peaking at number 30 on the UK Singles Chart. "Azonto"'s lyrics promote the viral dance step of the same name, which Fuse ODG discovered during a trip to Ghana. There were multiple music videos released for "Azonto", with the first one, directed by U Media Films, featuring two masked people showing people walking down the streets of London how to dance Azonto. The second video was directed by Mr. Moe Musa, and was published to YouTube on 27 April 2012, with a guest appearance and extra verse from Donae'o, alongside other cameos from DJ Neptizzle, Eddie Kadi, and Stay Jay. The third and final video released for "Azonto" was published to YouTube on 15 August 2013.

"Antenna" was released as the second single from the album on 12 August 2012, when it premiered on BBC Radio 1Xtra. The single originally appeared on Fuse ODG's debut EP The Buzz (2012). On 2 June 2013, he released a six-track EP for remixes of "Antenna" on iTunes. It peaked at number 7 in the UK and at number 9 in Scotland. To promote its release, ODG launched a dance competition for the single. Winners of the competition received an all-expenses-paid one-week trip for two to Abidjan, VIP passes to Fuse ODG's performance in Ivory Coast, a cameo in the "Antenna" music video, and a chance to appear on stage with Fuse. Fuse ODG announced the first-place winners to the challenge, Team Manchester via his website. Two remixes for "Antenna" were released. The first one, featuring Haitian rapper Wyclef Jean, was released on 16 December 2012 alongside its music video, which was directed by Mr. Moe Musa. It won Afro Pop Song of the Year at the 2013 Vodafone Ghana Music Awards and was nominated for Song of the Year at the same event. Moreover, it received nominations for Most Gifted Dance Video at the 2014 Channel O Music Video Awards and Song of the Year at the 2014 African Muzik Magazine Awards. The second remix features Nigerian singer Wande Coal, Ghanaian rapper Sarkodie, and Ghanaian duo R2Bees, and was premiered on 22 April 2013 on BBC Radio 1Xtra with DJ Edu.

On 17 October 2013, the music video for "Million Pound Girl (Badder Than Bad)" was released. It was later released as the third single from the album on 27 December 2013, and peaked at number 5 on the UK Singles Chart. "Million Pound Girl (Badder Than Bad)" also reached peaks like number 11 in Scotland, and number 65 in Ireland.

The fourth single from the album, "Dangerous Love", features Jamaican singer Sean Paul. First released on 7 March 2014, the song was released on iTunes on 16 May 2014. It managed to peak at number 3 on the UK Singles Chart, becoming his highest-charting single in that country to date. It also peaked at number 4 on the Scottish Singles Chart and number 55 on the Irish Singles Chart. "Dangerous Love" was nominated for Best Song at the MOBO Awards 2014.

The Angel-assisted title track was released as the fifth single from the album on 17 October 2014. It managed to peak at number 9 on the UK Singles Chart, becoming his fourth top 10 single in that country. Fuse ODG released the videos for "Letter to TINA" and "Ye Play" on 15 December 2014 and 31 January 2015 respectively.

== Track listing ==
T.I.N.A. – standard edition
No.	Title	Writer(s)	Producer(s)	Length
1.	"Letter to TINA"	Nana Abiona; Joseph Addison; Tinashe Muyambo	KillBeatz; Fuse ODG; Tinashe Muyambo	4:04
2.	"Bucket Full of Sunshine"	Abiona	KillBeatz	4:04
3.	"Million Pound Girl (Badder Than Bad)"	Abiona; Addison	KillBeatz	4:06
4.	"This Girl"	Abiona; Theodore Davis	Theo Davis; Fuse ODG	3:18
5.	"Antenna"	Abiona; Addison; Arjun Selvarajah	KillBeatz; Arjun Haze	3:42
6.	"Over"	Abiona; Muyambo	Muyambo; Fuse ODG	2:30
7.	"Thinking About U" (featuring KillBeatz)	Abiona; Addison	KillBeatz	3:16
8.	"Dangerous Love" (featuring Sean Paul)	Abiona; Sean Paul; Addison; Stephen McGregor	KillBeatz; Di Genius; Romeo Miller	3:55
9.	"Azonto" (featuring Itz Tiffany)	Abiona; Tiffany Owusu; Addison; Davis	KillBeatz; Theo Davis; Fuse ODG	3:52
10.	"Ye Play"	Abiona; Maleek Shoyebi	Maleek Berry	3:27
11.	"I'll Be Back"	Abiona; Addison	KillBeatz; Fuse ODG	4:37
12.	"T.I.N.A." (featuring Angel)	Abiona; Sirach Charles; Addison	KillBeatz	3:21

T.I.N.A. – deluxe edition (bonus tracks)
No.	Title	Writer(s)	Producer(s)	Length
13.	"Office Work" (featuring Mr Hackett)	Abiona; Andre Hackett; Davis; Selvarajah; Salim Sayed	Theo Davis; Arjun Haze; Fuse ODG; Salim Sayed	4:23
14.	"Disappear"	Abiona; Oloruntosin Babalola	Platinum Toxx	3:15
15.	"Keep on Shining" (featuring Wyclef Jean)	Abiona; Wyclef Jean; Addison; Rodney Hwingwiri	KillBeatz; Rymez; Fuse ODG; Wyclef Jean	4:00
16.	"Beautiful Sunray" (featuring G Frsh and Krept and Konan)	Abiona; Gordon Egwu; Casyo Johnson; Karl Wilson	Rymez	4:13

== Charts ==
Chart (2014)	Peak position
UK Albums (Official Charts)	25
Scottish Albums (Official Charts)	63

== Certifications ==
Region	Certification	Certified units/sales
United Kingdom (BPI)	Silver	60,000^{‡}
^{‡} Sales+streaming figures based on certification alone.

== Release history ==
Region	Date	Format(s)	Label
Ireland	31 October 2014	CD; Digital download	3 Beat Records
United Kingdom	3 November 2014	CD; Digital download	3 Beat Records
