= Mugeez =

Ghanaian rapper and singer

- Born: Rashid Abdul Mugeez; January 1, 1990 (age 36); Tema, Ghana
- Genres: Hip hop, Afrobeats, highlife, dancehall
- Occupations: Rapper, singer, songwriter
- Instrument: Vocal
- Years active: 2007–present
- Label: Extrial Music
- Member of: R2Bees

Rashid Abdul Mugeez, professionally known as Mugeez, is a Ghanaian rapper, singer and songwriter. Born in Bimbila (Northern region, Ghana), he became known through the influential Hip hop and hiplife duo R2Bees (Refuse To Be Broke), which he formed with his cousin Faisal Hakeem (aka Omar Sterling) in 2007. The last album by R2Bees, Site 15, from 2019, made it into the top 10 on the Billboard Chart. He has also worked with Ed Sheeran on Boa Me. In April 2019, Mugeez founded his own record label, Extrial Music, to promote his solo projects as well as up-and-coming artists.

== Early life ==
Rashid Abdul Mugeez developed his love for rap while attending school, which led to him and his cousin forming R2Bees in 2007.The duo released their debut album, Da Revolution, in 2009. A follow-up, Da Revolution II, came in 2012, before the pair were nominated for Best International Act at the 2013 BET Awards. Various R2Bees singles appeared over the next few years, while Mugeez also struck out on his own, featuring on singles with the likes of Criss Waddle, Mr. Eazi, and DJ Breezy. In 2017, he was featured on Fuse ODG's single "Boa Me," alongside Ed Sheeran. The two cousins lived in the same house and also attended the same primary, junior, and senior secondary schools in Tema. Beginning their career early, they started off representing their school in school music contests. This led them to participating in the popular radio competition Kasahare, which they won. Their continuous performance gained them popularity within their community.

== Career ==
=== 2007–2012: Foundation of R2Bees and "Da Revolution" – First Album R2Bees ===
In 2007, the two cousins officially formed the music duo R2Bees in Ghana. Mugeez is the lead vocalist of R2Bees, while Omar Sterling is the rapper and the CEO of R2Bees Entertainment and KillBeatz's Joseph Addison is R2Bees’ official producer. R2Bees’ lyrics are in Twi and Ghanaian Pidgin English languages and their music is a mixture of Afrobeat and Hiplife, a Ghanaian music style that fuses Ghanaian culture and Hip Hop.

=== 2019: Foundation of Extrial Music ===
After the Site 15 album featuring Afrobeat artists Wizkid, Burna Boy, King Promise and Kwesi Arthur with tracks like "Over", "Sunshine", "Yesterday" and "My Baby". Mugeez founded his own record label, Extrial Music to promote his own solo projects as well as support up-and-coming artists. Kicking things off, Mugeez released the singles "Regular" with Sarkodie and "Your Number" with Juls and King Promise. Mugeez also signed Tecknikal, an artist from Ghana, as the first artist under his record label. After the foundation of Extrial in April 2019, Mugeez teamed up with DJ Mic Smith and Kwesi Arthur to release the single "Dripping". "Chihuahua" is Mugeez's first solo single in 2020 and was released on March 27 after an exclusive pre-release on Audiomack. On 8 May 2020 "Six In Da Morning" was released.

== Awards and nominations ==
=== BET Awards ===
Year	Nominee / work	Award	Result
BET Awards 2013	R2Bees	Best International Act: Africa	Nominated

=== Ghana Music Awards ===
Year	Nominee / work	Award	Result
2015	R2Bees	Group of the Year	Nominated
2015	Lobi	Highlife Song of the Year	Nominated
2015	Killing me softly	Afro Pop Song of the Year	Nominated
2014	R2Bees	Group of the Year	Won
2014	R2Bees	Hiplife/ Hip Hop Artist of the Year	Nominated
2014	R2Bees	Artist of the Year	Nominated
2014	"Slow down"	Best Collaboration of the Year	Nominated
2014	"Slow down"	Vodafone Song of the Year	Nominated
2013	R2Bees	Artist of the Year	Won
2013	R2Bees	Hiplife/ Hip Hop Artist of the Year	Won
2013	R2Bees	Group of the Year	Won
2013	Slow down	Best Collaboration of the Year	Won
2013	Life	Vodafone Song of the Year	Won
2013	"Odo"	Highlife Song of the Year	Won
2013	Bayla Trap	Hip Life/Hip Hop Song of the Year	Nominated
2013	Odo	Male Vocal Performance	Nominated
2013	Mugeez	Song Writer of the Year	Nominated
2011	Kiss your hand	Afro Pop Song of the year	Won
2011	Kiss your hand	Collaboration of the Year	Won
2011	R2Bees	Hip pop/Hiplife Artist of the Year	Nominated

=== The Headies ===
Year	Nominee / work	Award	Result
2013	R2Bees	Best African Artist	—N/a
2014	R2Bees	Best African Artist	Nominated

=== Nigeria Entertainment Awards ===
Year	Nominee / work	Award	Result
2013	R2Bees	Western African Artist or Group of the Year	Nominated
2014	R2Bees	African Artist of the Year (Non-Nigerian)	Nominated

== Selected videography ==
Year	Title	Director	Ref
2015	Makoma	Nana Asihene	
2015	Gboza Featuring Davido	Justin Campos of Gorilla Films	
2016	Tonight Featuring Wizkid	Sesan Ogunro	
2017	Plantain Chips	ThisIsbutta	
2017	Over	Unknown	
2018	Could This Be Love Featuring Efya	Babs Direction	
2018	WE DA VIBE	Justin Campos	
2018	SUPA Featuring Wizkid	Babs Direction	
2018	Beautiful	Justin Campos	
2019	Yesterday	Unknown	
2019	Site 13	David Duncan	
2019	Picture Featuring King Promise	Justin Campos	
2019	Sunshine	Justin Campos	
2020	Yawa Featuring Sarkodie	Jay	
2020	Dripping Featuring DJ MicSmith and Kwesi Arthur	Lex McCarthy	
2020	Chihuahua	David Duncan	
2021	Fine Wine Featuring King Promise and Joeboy	Century Films	
2021	Eboso	Six & Jags	
2022	Need Your Love Featuring Gyakie	Nimi Hendrix	
2022	Another One Featuring Stonebwoy	Justin Campos	
2022	Sure Banker	David Duncan	
