= Azonto (disambiguation) =

Azonto is a West African music genre and dance.

Azonto may also refer to:

- "Azonto" (Fuse ODG song), 2013
- "Azonto" (Wizkid song), 2012
- "Azonto", by Matisse & Sadko, 2014
