= KillBeatz =

Ghanaian record producer and sound engineer

- Born: Joseph Kwame Addison; Tema, Ghana
- Genres: Afrobeats; Afro-pop; Azonto; gospel; highlife; hiplife
- Occupations: Sound engineer, music producer
- Years active: 2007–present
- Label: Legacy Life Entertainment

Joseph Kwame Addison, popularly known as KillBeatz, is a Ghanaian music producer and sound engineer. He is a member of music group R2bees and is also the CEO of Legacy Life Entertainment, which has signed the Ghanaian musician King Promise.

== Life and career ==
KillBeatz started playing instruments for his church before he ventured into secular music. He started as a rapper and later switched to music production. He got the name KillBeatz from Ghanaian rapper Omar Sterling (Paedae) of R2Bees. He was helped by Ghanaian music producer Kaywa at the early stage of his career.

He reported to the manager of the studio and insisted he could produce his own beat as he could already play the keyboard, and all he needed was help with the setup, as he had no prior knowledge in using DAWs at the time. The manager’s reaction after he produced ...”You are better than the producer, You need to come and work!”, so KillBeatz started working and eventually all customers preferred him over the previous producer. He has worked with artists like Sarkodie, Efya, R2Bees, Wizkid, Ed Sheeran, and Fuse ODG, among others.

The various genres of music he produces for include highlife, hiplife, Azonto, Afrobeats, gospel and afro-pop. In 2012, KillBeatz contributed heavily to the Azonto music genre by producing beats for a lot of Azonto songs during its prime.

Killbeatz won Producer of the Year at the Vodafone Ghana Music Awards (VGMA) in 2013, 2014, and 2018. He received production credit on a song titled "Bibia Be Ye Ye" by British singer Ed Sheeran featuring UK-based Ghanaian artiste Fuse ODG. The song was part of Ed Sheeran’s ÷ ("Divide") album, which won Best Pop Vocal Album at the 60th Grammy Awards in 2018.

== Discography ==
=== Songs recorded ===
Artists	Songs recorded
R2Bees	"Yawa Girl", "Bayla Trap", "Life", "Love", "Lobi", "Its Alright", "Embassy", "Picture", "Gboza (ft. Davido)" "Over", "Slow Down" (ft. Wizkid), "Tonight" (ft. Wizkid), "Kiss Your Hand" (ft. Wande Coal)
Sarkodie	"Down on One" (ft. Fuse ODG), "I'm In Love With You" (ft. Efya), "Baby" (ft. Mugeez (R2Bees)), "M3gye Wo Girl" (ft. Shatta Wale), "Love Rocks" (ft. Samini)
Fuse ODG	"Azonto" (ft. Itz Tiffany), "Antenna" (ft. Wyclef Jean), "Dangerous Love" (ft Sean Paul), "Boa Me" (ft. Ed Sheeran & Mugeez (R2Bees)), "Bombea" (ft. Zack Knight & Badshah), "Million Pound Girl", "Thinking About You" (ft. Killbeatz), "T.I.N.A (ft. Angel)", "Diary (ft. Tiwa Savage)"
King Promise	"Oh Yeah", "Selfish", "Hey Sexy", "Thank God", "CCTV" (ft. Sarkodie & Mugeez (R2Bees)), "Tokyo" (ft. Wizkid), Commando, Abena, Hangover
Ed Sheeran	"Bibia Be Ye Ye"
Efya	"Jorley" (ft. Sarkodie)
B4Bonah	"My Girl" (ft. King Promise)
Yemi Alade	"Hustler" (ft. Youssoupha)
Burna Boy	"Hallelujah" "Gbona"
Fancy Gadam	"Total Cheat" (ft. Sarkodie)
Nana Boro	"Aha Yede"
Kuami Eugene	"Angela"
Samini	"Time Bomb" (ft. Wizkid), "Do That" (ft. Fuse ODG)
Mr Eazi	"Business" (ft. Mugeez (R2Bees)), "Dabebi" (ft. King Promise & Maleek Berry)
Wizkid	"Jah Bless Me"
Yaw Siki	"Happy Day" (ft. Mugeez (R2Bees)), "Wope Dodo", "Blow My Mind", "Thank You", Jeggings Party
Adina	"Too Late"
M.anifest	"Forget Dem"
Ova Wise	"Me & You"
Stephanie Benson	"One More" (ft. Samini)
OB	"Odo Mu Criminal" (ft. Sarkodie), "Be My Wife" (ft. Mr Eazi)
Jay Ghartey	"Marry You (All My Life)"
4×4	"Kpagam Kpagam", "We No Dey Carry Last"
Criss Waddle	"Forgetti Obiaa" (ft. Paedae (R2Bees))
Cwesi Oteng	Jehovah Overdo
Kill Beatz	"Pretty Little Girl ft.King Promise X Ofori Amponsah","Borkor(slowly) ft. Fuse ODG X Mugeez"
Stay Jay	"Shashee wowo","My Baby ft.Mugeez"
Tiffany	"Spanner","Neke nenke(dance)","Agye gboom ft castro","Akye woo", etc.
