= Kakalika =

Ghanaian dance and music

- Origin: Ghana

Kakalika is a music and dance genre from Ghana. The word originally means "cockroach" in the Ga language. The song was made by DopeNation and released in October 2025, and quickly gained popularity on social media due its fun nature, playful lyrics, and simple swinging dance movement. Kakalika's popularity was also buttressed by its use as a goal celebration by many professional football players. In February 2026, the song peaked at number 35 on the US Billboard Afrobeat Chart and number two on 3Music's #MonsterHitz chart.

== History ==
According to Asamoah Gyan, the dance originated from Nima in 2012 and was performed by a young dancer over there known as Agaya Sexy Dancer.

== Notable performers ==
- Adolf Tagoe, Ghanaian Afropop singer and Kakalika dancer
- In March 2026, Chloe Kelly and Olivia Smith performed the Kakalika dance after they scored goals.against London City Lionesses.
- In March 2026, Jamal Amofa performed the Kakalika dance after he scored against Almere City.
- In March 2026, the Black Stars players performed the Kakalika dance.
- In April 2026, Abdul Fatawu Issahaku performed the Kakalika dance after he scored a goal against Germany.
- In April 2026, William Osula performed the Kakalika dance after he scored against AFC Bournemouth.
- In April 2026, Bernard Avle performed the Kakalika dance with inmates at the Osamkrom Prison.
- In May 2026, PSG football players celebrated using the Kakalika song after kicking Bayern Munich out of the UEFA Champions League.
- In May 2026, FC Barcelona celebrated their 2025/26 La Liga win using the Kakalika song.
- In May 2026, Thierno Barry performed the Kakalika dance after he scored against Man City.
- In May 2026, Joseph Asare, a Ghanaian student at the University of illinois Chicago performed the Kakalika dance with one of his professors during his graduation ceremony.
- In May 2026, Ghanaian students at Howard University performed the Kakalika dance during their graduation.
- In May 2026, Ghanaian athletes performed the Kakalika dance after they qualified to the men's 4x100m relay final in Accra during the African Senior Athletics Championships.

== See also ==
- Azonto
- Alkayida
