= Antenna (song) =

Single by Fuse ODG

from the album T.I.N.A. and the EP The Buzz
- Released: 12 August 2012
- Recorded: 2012
- Genre: Afrobeats; dance
- Length: 3:04
- Label: 3 Beat
- Songwriters: Nana Richard Abiona: Joseph Addison; Arjun Selvarajah
- Producer: KillBeatz

Fuse ODG singles chronology
"Azonto" (2011)	"Antenna" (2012)	"Million Pound Girl (Badder Than Bad)" (2013)

Music video
- "Antenna" on YouTube

"Antenna" is a song by Ghanaian-English Afrobeats recording artist Fuse ODG. The song premiered on BBC Radio 1Xtra on 12 August 2012, and first appeared on his debut EP The Buzz in September 2012. It was released as a single in the United Kingdom through 3 Beat Productions on 2 June 2013, and became his first chart entry, debuting and peaking at number 7 on the UK Singles Chart, as well as reaching number 9 in Scotland. The song received several award nominations and won Afro Pop Song of the Year at the 2013 Ghana Music Awards. A remix to "Antenna" featuring Haitian rapper Wyclef Jean was released alongside its music video in December 2012. On 22 April 2013, Fuse ODG released an additional remix to the song featuring Nigerian singer Wande Coal, Ghanaian rapper Sarkodie, and Ghanaian duo R2Bees.

== Background and release ==
"Antenna" premiered on BBC Radio 1Xtra on 12 August 2012 during DJ Edu's Destination Africa show. It was written by Fuse ODG, Arjun Haze, and KillBeatz; the latter also produced the single. The song first appeared on Fuse ODG's debut EP The Buzz, which was released in September 2012. It was later issued as a single in the United Kingdom on 2 June 2013 through 3 Beat Records. On the same day, Fuse ODG released Antenna (Remixes), a six-track digital EP on iTunes, which included several alternate versions of the song.

== Promotion ==
To promote the song, Fuse ODG launched a dance competition for "Antenna" in August 2012. He encouraged participants to submit dance videos inspired by the song. Winners received an all-expenses-paid one-week trip for two to Abidjan, VIP passes to Fuse ODG's performance in Ivory Coast, a cameo appearance in the song's music video, and an opportunity to appear on stage with the artist. The winning group, Team Manchester, was announced on Fuse ODG's official website.

== Music video ==
A music video to accompany the release of "Antenna" was first released onto YouTube on 16 December 2012 at a total length of four minutes and ten seconds.

== Accolades ==
Year	Awards ceremony	Award description(s)	Results	Ref
2013	Ghana Music Awards	Vodafone Song of the Year	Nominated	
2013	Ghana Music Awards	Afro Pop Song of the Year	Won	
2013	Channel O Music Video Awards	Most Gifted Dance Video	Nominated	
2013	Channel O Music Video Awards	Most Gifted Video of the Year	Nominated	
2014	African Muzik Magazine Awards	Song of the Year	Nominated	

== Track listing ==
Digital download
No.	Title	Length
1.	"Antenna" (UK Radio Edit)	3:04
2.	"Antenna" (UK Club Mix)	3:43
3.	"Antenna" (Steve Smart & Westfunk Radio Edit)	2:53
4.	"Antenna" (Steve Smart & Westfunk Remix)	4:48
5.	"Antenna" (TS7 Remix)	3:40
6.	"Antenna" (Remix ft. Wyclef Jean)	3:44

== Charts ==
=== Weekly charts ===
Chart (2013)	Peak position
Ireland (IRMA)	85
Scotland Singles (OCC)	9
UK Singles (OCC)	7

=== Year-end charts ===
Chart (2013)	Position
UK Singles (OCC)	66

== Certifications ==
Region	Certification	Certified units/sales
United Kingdom (BPI)	Platinum	600,000^{‡}
^{‡} Sales+streaming figures based on certification alone.

== Release history ==
Country	Date	Format	Label
United Kingdom	2 June 2013	Digital download	3 Beat Productions
