= Samuel Sarpong Ankrah =

Ghanaian economist

Dr. Sam Ankrah
- Born: Samuel Sarpong Ankrah; May 30, 1974; Kumasi, Ghana
- Education: University of London; Cranfield School of Management; Universidad Empresarial de Costa Rica
- Occupation: Development Economist
- Years active: 2006- present
- Known for: Investment strategist
- Title: CEO at Africa Investment Group
- Movement: Alternative Force for Action (AFA)

Samuel Sarpong Ankrah, simply referred to as Sam Ankrah (born 30 May 1974), is a Ghanaian economist and investment strategist. He is the CEO and Principal Partner of Africa Investment Group, an investment firm operating in Ghana and Switzerland. Since 2022, he has also served as the Chairman for Trade and Investment at the International Chamber of Commerce Ghana. In 2023, Ankrah announced his independent candidacy for Ghana's 2024 presidential election but was disqualified over nomination form errors, a decision he disputed.

== Early life and education ==
Ankrah was born on May 30, 1974, in Kumasi, Ghana, to James William Ankrah and Felicia Duku Amponsah. He attended Opoku Ware School, where he completed his O-level and A-level studies from 1986 to 1991.

Ankrah attained his higher education in the United Kingdom, earning a degree in Statistics from the University of London, and an MBA in Finance from Cranfield School of Management. He further pursued an MSc in Economics, as well as a PhD in Philosophy, at Pan-American University in United States. He obtained a Master of Science (MSc) in Economics and a Doctor of Philosophy (PhD) in Finance from Universidad Empresarial de Costa Rica.

== Career ==
Ankrah is the CEO and Principal Partner of Africa Investment Group in Ghana and Switzerland, where he oversees the company's long-term strategy since 2008. Since 2022, he serves as the Chairman for Trade and Investment at the International Chamber of Commerce Ghana, an organization he had served as the vice chair. In 2016, Ankrah co-founded the New Africa Mobility Fund, an initiative of the AIG which focus on supporting development opportunities across Africa.

Ankrah also held roles as a Director and Partner at the Switzerland-based investment firms Kaitan Capital and Rampartners. He has locally served for several multinational companies, including SICPA Switzerland and TATA Energy. Additionally, he served as the Chairman of Onix DC. He is certified by the UK Financial Conduct Authority (FCA).

== Politics ==
In 2023, Ankrah announced his independent candidacy for Ghana's 2024 presidential election under the "No Masked Promises" campaign. However, he was disqualified by the Electoral Commission for failing to correct errors in his nomination forms. He called the decision "discriminatory" and "premeditated", claiming that the Electoral Commission of Ghana did not specify the errors, preventing him from making corrections.

== Advocacy ==
In 2015, Ankrah criticized Ghana's banking sector for being risk-averse and failing to take a leadership role in economic development. He urged banks to advocate for repatriating oil revenues to fund housing projects, arguing that this could generate sustainable revenue and reduce reliance on external aid. He also called on banks to support local businesses with capital instead of prioritizing low-risk investments.

== Recognitions ==
- 2012: He was recognized in the GUBA Awards.

== See also ==
- Economy of Ghana
