= T.I.N.A. (song) =

Single by Fuse ODG featuring Angel

from the album T.I.N.A.
- B-side: "Historical Song"
- Released: 19 October 2014
- Recorded: 2012–2013
- Genre: Afrobeats
- Length: 3:20
- Label: 3 Beat Productions
- Producer: Killbeatz

Fuse ODG singles chronology
"Dangerous Love" (2014)	"T.I.N.A." (2014)	"Thinking About U" (2015)

Angel singles chronology
"Lights On" (2013)	"T.I.N.A." (2014)	"Rude Boy" (2016)

"T.I.N.A." (pronounced "Tina", but also in stylization an acronym for This Is New Africa) is the fifth single by English-Ghanaian Afrobeats recording artist Fuse ODG, featuring guest vocals from Angel. The song features on his debut album of the same name. It was released in the United Kingdom as a digital download on 19 October 2014, after being pushed back from its originally scheduled release date of 5 October 2014.

== Charts ==
Chart (2014)	Peak position
Ireland (IRMA)	91
Scottish Singles Sales (Official Charts)	8
UK Singles (Official Charts)	9

== Certifications ==
Region	Certification	Certified units/sales
United Kingdom (BPI)	Silver	200,000^{‡}
^{‡} Sales+streaming figures based on certification alone.

== Release history ==
Country	Date	Format	Label
United Kingdom	19 October 2014	Digital download	3 Beat Productions
