= End Game (song) =

2017 single by Taylor Swift featuring Ed Sheeran and Future

Single by Taylor Swift featuring Ed Sheeran and Future

from the album Reputation
- Released: November 14, 2017
- Studio: MXM (Los Angeles and Stockholm); Seismic Activities (Portland); Tree Sound (Atlanta)
- Genre: Boom bap; pop rap; R&B
- Length: 4:04
- Label: Big Machine
- Songwriters: Taylor Swift; Max Martin; Shellback; Ed Sheeran; Nayvadius Wilburn
- Producers: Max Martin; Shellback

Taylor Swift singles chronology
"...Ready for It?" (2017)	"End Game" (2017)	"New Year's Day" (2017)

Ed Sheeran singles chronology
"Boa Me" (2017)	"End Game" (2017)	"Perfect Duet" (2017)

Future singles chronology
"Real Thing" (2017)	"End Game" (2017)	"Patek Water" (2017)

Music video
- "End Game" on YouTube

"End Game" is a song by the American singer-songwriter Taylor Swift featuring the English singer-songwriter Ed Sheeran and the American rapper Future. Written alongside the producers Max Martin and Shellback, it was originally released as a track from her sixth studio album, Reputation on November 10, 2017, before being released four days later as the third single. "End Game" is an incorporation of boom bap, pop rap, and R&B, featuring loose vocal cadences and hip-hop-influenced drums that create trap beats. The lyrics are about finding true love amidst the gossip on ones' perceived reputations.

Contemporary critics received "End Game" with mixed reviews; some praised the hip-hop experimentation and Future's appearance and hailed the production as catchy, but others found the track and Sheeran's appearance uninteresting. The single reached the top 40 on the singles charts and received platinum certifications in Australia, Canada, and the US.

A music video for the single, directed by Joseph Kahn, was released on January 12, 2018. The video depicts Swift partying with Future in Miami, with Sheeran in Tokyo, and with other friends in London. Swift performed "End Game" at the 2017 Jingle Ball and on her 2018 Reputation Stadium Tour. She performed it as a "surprise song" twice on the Eras Tour (2023–2024).

== Production and composition ==
"End Game"
"End Game" is a hybrid of pop, R&B and hip-hop that finds Swift talking about her desire to be her lover's "end game".

"End Game" was produced by Max Martin and Shellback. The two also co-wrote the song with Taylor Swift, Ed Sheeran and Future. Swift is credited as the main singer, while Sheeran and Future are credited as featured artists. It was recorded for Swift's sixth studio album, Reputation (2017). The song is the only song on Reputation that features guest artists. For his songwriting, Sheeran came up with the inspiration while attending a Fourth of July party at Swift's residence in Rhode Island. At that party, Sheeran encountered Cherry Seaborn, a girl who went to the same school with him. They reconnected and ultimately became married. His verse includes a reference to the film Born on the Fourth of July (1989), a symbol of the beginning of his relationship with Seaborn. The song was recorded at three studios: MXM Studios in Los Angeles and Stockholm, Seismic Activities Studios in Portland, Oregon, and Tree Sound Studios in Atlanta. It was mixed by Serban Ghenea at MixStar Studios in Virginia Beach, Virginia; and Mastered by Randy Merrill at Sterling Sound Studios in New York.

"End Game" incorporates boom bap, pop rap, and R&B, with elements of pop and hip-hop. Its production features loose cadences, trap beats, and hip hop-influenced drums; Pitchfork's Meaghan Garvey described the production elements as representative of contemporary hip-hop and R&B trends of 2017. In the lyrics, the three artists talk about their true love amidst the gossip about their perceived reputations. At the song's beginning, Swift asserts that she and her lover both have "bad" and "big reputations". Future then echoes this perspective, saying that he has a "bad boy persona, that's what they like". In his part, Sheeran raps about how his love interest was "born on the Fourth of July". For Swift's part, she channels half-singing, half-rapping delivery found in hip hop, making fun of the media gossip on her image: "I swear I don't love the drama / It loves me." The chorus finds Swift singing "I wanna be your endgame" to her lover.

== Release and promotion ==
On November 7, 2017, Swift announced track listing of Reputation, where "End Game" was unveiled. Three days later, the album was released with "End Game" being its second track. The song was picked as the third single promoting the project. On November 14, Mercury Records issued the song to French radio airplay, while in the United States, Republic Records pushed the track to contemporary hit radio panels.

Swift and Sheeran performed "End Game" for the first time during the Jingle Ball festival hosted by iHeartRadio on December 2, 2017. A solo version of the song was included in the regular set list for Swift's Reputation Stadium Tour (2018). Swift performed "End Game" as an acoustic surprise song as part of her Eras Tour concert on November 11, 2023, in Buenos Aires, and with Sheeran as a mashup with "Everything Has Changed" and "Thinking Out Loud" on August 15, 2024, in London.

== Critical reception ==
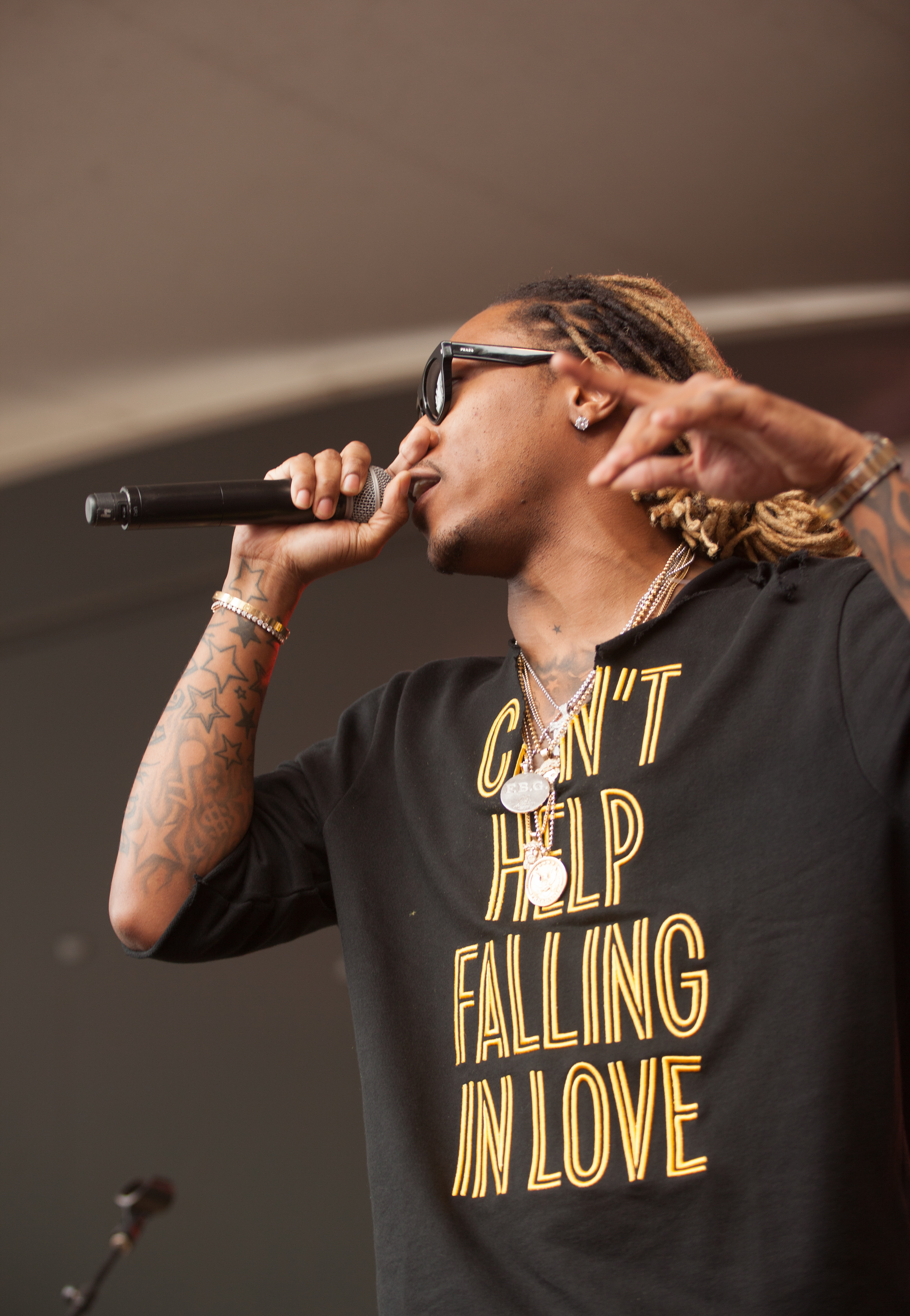
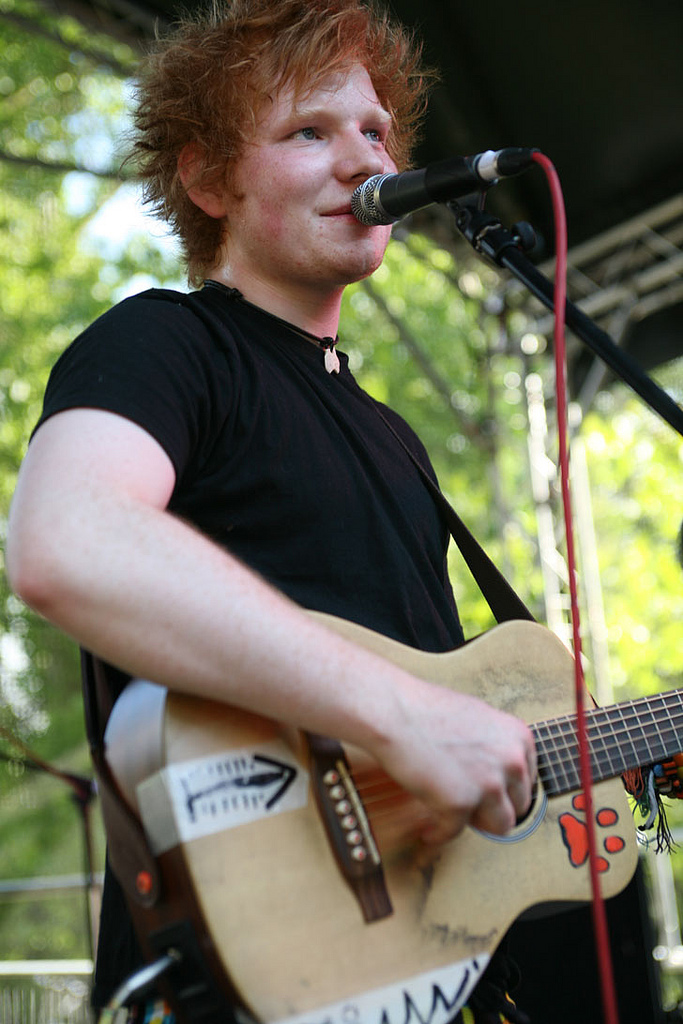
Critics praised the verse by Future (left), but were less favorable toward the verse by Ed Sheeran (right).

The song received mixed reviews from critics. Kitty Empire from The Observer selected "End Game" as an example for Swift's experimentation with R&B on Reputation, noting that it "isn't very good". In a review by Pitchfork, Meaghan Garvey was not impressed by the guest appearances of Future and Sheeran, the former of which was seemingly a means to help Swift stay relevant with contemporary hip hop trends. Garvey also criticized the production as bland, feeling that the song is an "uninspired" attempt at the authentic hip hop sound: "The decisions here feel measured to the point of lifelessness; preoccupied by the end game, risks become liabilities." Brian Josephs from Spin praised Future's verse, feeling that the rapper "fully owned it, making him a bizarrely good fit for a modern day Swift song". Josephs however was disappointed with Sheeran's appearance, and considered the song's overall theme of "attempting to find love in spite of real or perceived enemies" similar to previous "far better" songs by Future.

Writing for PopMatters, Evan Sawdey picked "End Game" as one of Reputation's "misguided" songs, alongside "Look What You Made Me Do" and "This Is Why We Can't Have Nice Things". Though complimentary of Future's appearance and Swift's lyrics, Lindsay Lozadz from The Ringer panned Sheeran's verse as "rapping so hard that you can practically smell the sweat he breaks trying to keep up with Future", which blemished the whole song. Michelle Da Silva from Now was critical of Swift's lyrics about drama and vengeance, deeming it inauthentic to her persona.

On a positive side, New York's Frank Guan lauded "End Game" as one of the best songs on Reputation, mostly thanks to the verse of Future and Swift's witty lyrics about her perceived image, and said that the song had potentials to be a chart success. Raise Bruner from Time considered the song to be Swift at her peak: "emotionally open, but ready and willing to have some fun with the hype around her own persona". Spencer Kornharber from The Atlantic called the song "maddeningly catchy" and compared its styles to music by Rihanna. Rob Sheffield from Rolling Stone was similarly positive, calling it "deeply weird, wildly funny", praising the chemistry of the three artists and Swift's witty lyrics.

"End Game" was one of the award-winning songs at the 2019 BMI Awards. It also won Pop Award at the 2019 BMI London Awards, in honor of songwriters and producers.

=== Accolades ===
Year	Organization	Award	Result	Ref.
2018	Teen Choice Awards	Choice Music Collaboration	Nominated	
2019
2019	BMI Awards	Award Winning Song	Won	
2019	BMI Awards	Publisher of the Year	Won	
2019	BMI London Award	Pop Award	Won	

== Commercial performance ==
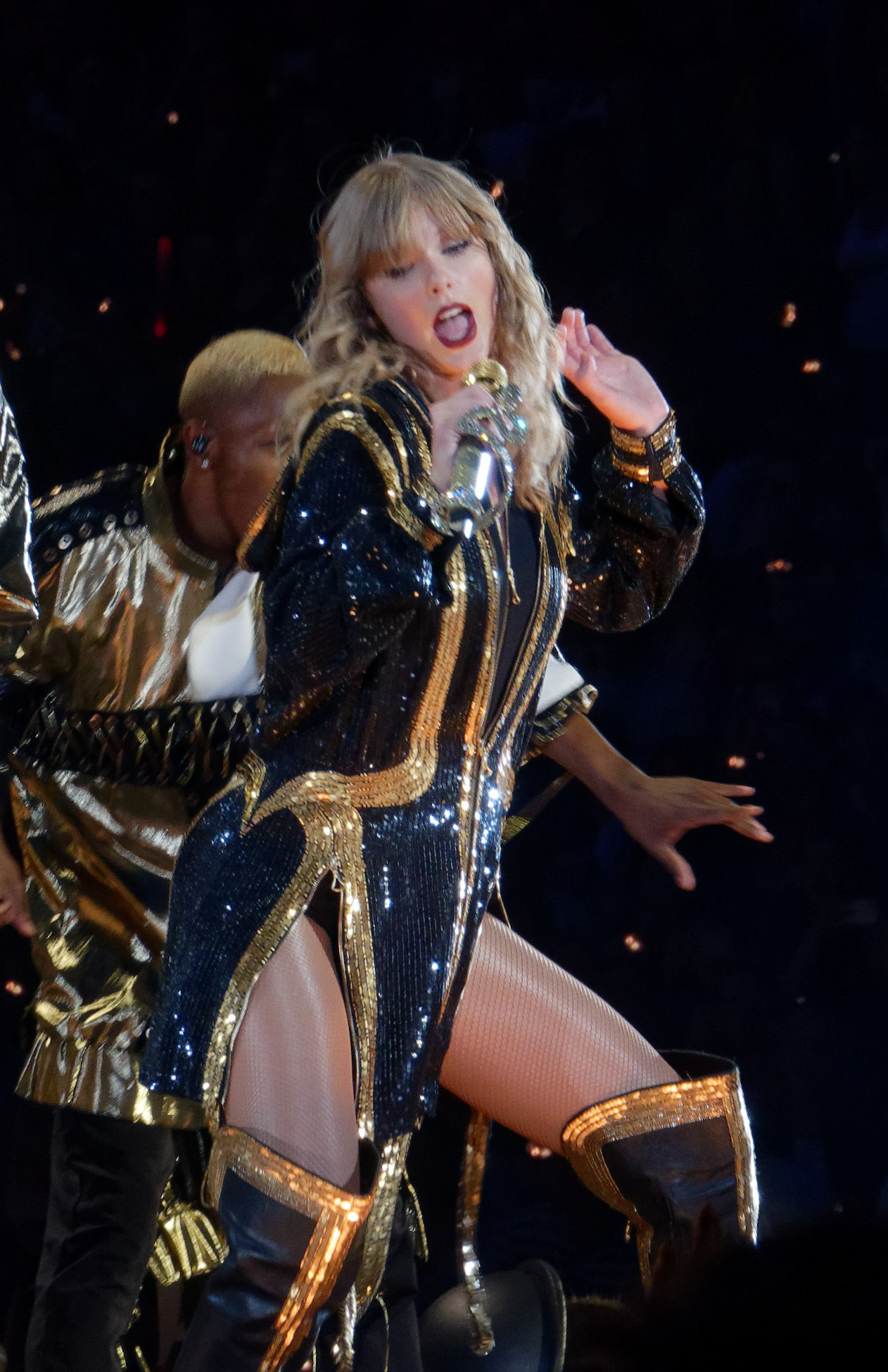
Swift performing "End Game" on her Reputation Stadium Tour (2018)

"End Game" was the only non-single song from Reputation to debut on the US Billboard Hot 100 upon the release of the parent album. It debuted on the chart dated December 9, 2017, at number 86, earning Swift her 75th Hot 100 entry. "End Game" debuted at number 32 on the Mainstream Top 40, before rising to number 26 the following week. It debuted at number 38 on the Adult Top 40, eventually peaking at number 13. In its third charting week, "End Game" rose to number 39, giving Swift her 55th Hot 100 top-40 chart entry and becoming Reputation's fifth top-40 song, following "Look What You Made Me Do", "...Ready for It?", "Gorgeous", and "Call It What You Want". "End Game" later reached a peak of number 18. The single peaked at number 10 on the Mainstream Top 40, and number 25 on the Rhythmic Songs chart. It was certified platinum by the Recording Industry Association of America (RIAA) for exceeding 1,000,000 units based on sales and streaming in the U.S.

In Canada, "End Game" peaked at number 11 on the Canadian Hot 100 and was certified platinum by Music Canada. The single peaked at number 36 on the Australian ARIA Charts and was certified platinum by the Australian Recording Industry Association (ARIA). It was certified silver by the British Phonographic Industry in the U.K., where it peaked at number 49 on the UK Singles Chart. The song was also certified platinum in Brazil and double platinum in Norway.

== Music video ==
On December 2, 2017, Sheeran confirmed at the Jingle Ball festival that a music video for the song would be released. On January 10, 2018, Swift revealed through her social media app "The Swift Life"—an app created with Glu Mobile for fans in support of Reputation—with a still image from the video and text that the music video for the song would be released on January 12, that she would be releasing more stills, and that after a snippet of the video would premiere on Good Morning America on January 11. Swift premiered a 20-second snippet on Good Morning America, and posted it on her social media accounts later that day.

On January 12, 2018, Swift uploaded the video onto her Vevo channel. Directed by Joseph Kahn, the video depicts Swift partying at three locations during nighttime: with Future and partygoers on a yacht in Miami, with Sheeran at a nightclub in Tokyo, and with various friends on a double decker bus in London. While singing/rapping with Future, Swift is seen riding shotgun in a Lamborghini Aventador with him. In one of the London scenes, Swift is seen sitting on a bar playing Snake on a handheld game console, a reference to her reputation as a "snake" during promotion of the album. This reference is also noted in one of the Tokyo scenes, in which Swift rides a motorcycle in a snakeskin-patterned bodysuit. The superyacht MIZU was used for the Miami filming.

Frank Guan from New York observed that the video effectively eschewed Swift's previously well-known girl next door image, by "drinking, playing a game on her mobile phone, hamming it up at a karaoke bar, cheerfully failing at Dance Dance Revolution, really getting into Future, having a crowd of friends with only a few white girls and no white guys [apart from Ed Sheeran] in sight". Guan was impressed by the video's nighttime aesthetics featuring darkness against flashing lights and vivid colors, writing that "the end result is as simple as it is appealing". Lyndsey McKenna from NPR Music was less enthusiastic: "It's pretty hard to buy Swift and Sheeran's casual outing in Tokyo or Swift's supposedly uninhibited dance moves."

== Credits and personnel ==
Credits are adapted from the liner notes of Reputation.

- Taylor Swift – vocals, songwriter
- Max Martin – producer, songwriter, keyboards, programming
- Shellback – producer, songwriter, keyboards, programming, drums, bass
- Ed Sheeran – vocals, songwriter
- Future – vocals, songwriter
- Ilya – additional vocal producer
- Sam Holland – engineer
- Michael Ilbert – engineer
- Seth Ferkins – engineer
- Cory Bice – assistant engineer
- Jeremy Lertola – assistant engineer
- Sean Flora – assistant engineer
- Peter Karlsson – assistant engineer
- Mike Synphony – assistant engineer
- Daniel Watson – assistant engineer
- Serban Ghenea – mixing
- John Hanes – mix engineer
- Randy Merrill – mastering

== Charts ==
=== Weekly charts ===
2017–2018 weekly chart performance for "End Game"
Chart (2017–2018)	Peak position
Australia (ARIA)	36
Belgium (Ultratip Bubbling Under Flanders)	8
Belgium (Ultratip Bubbling Under Wallonia)	19
Canada Hot 100 (Billboard)	11
Canada CHR/Top 40 (Billboard)	17
Canada Hot AC (Billboard)	30
Colombia (National-Report)	84
Costa Rica (Monitor Latino)	6
Czech Republic Singles Digital (ČNS IFPI)	63
Dominican Republic Anglo (Monitor Latino)	9
El Salvador (Monitor Latino)	14
Finland Airplay (Radiosoittolista)	100
France (SNEP)	130
Greece (IFPI)	35
Ireland (IRMA)	68
Israel International TV Airplay (Media Forest)	2
Latvia (DigiTop100)	88
Mexico (Billboard Ingles Airplay)	25
Netherlands (Dutch Tipparade 40)	10
Netherlands (Single Tip)	18
New Zealand Heatseekers (RMNZ)	2
Nicaragua (Monitor Latino)	17
Philippines (BillboardPH Hot 100)	84
Poland Airplay (ZPAV)	52
Portugal (AFP)	81
Romania (Airplay 100)	84
Scottish Singles Sales (Official Charts)	54
Slovakia Singles Digital (ČNS IFPI)	64
UK Singles (Official Charts)	49
US Billboard Hot 100	18
US Adult Pop Airplay (Billboard)	13
US Dance Airplay (Billboard)	18
US Pop Airplay (Billboard)	10
US Rhythmic Airplay (Billboard)	25
Venezuela (National-Report)	95

=== Year-end charts ===
2018 year-end chart performance for "End Game"
Chart (2018)	Position
El Salvador (Monitor Latino)	77
US Adult Pop Songs (Billboard)	50
US Pop Songs (Billboard)	46

== Certifications ==
Certifications for "End Game"
Region	Certification	Certified units/sales
Australia (ARIA)	3× Platinum	210,000^{‡}
Brazil (Pro-Música Brasil)	Platinum	40,000^{‡}
Canada (Music Canada)	Platinum	80,000^{‡}
New Zealand (RMNZ)	Platinum	30,000^{‡}
Norway (IFPI Norway)	2× Platinum	120,000^{‡}
United Kingdom (BPI)	Gold	400,000^{‡}
United States (RIAA)	Platinum	1,000,000^{‡}
^{‡} Sales+streaming figures based on certification alone.

== Release history ==
Release dates and formats for "End Game"
Region	Date	Format(s)	Label	Ref.
France	November 14, 2017	Radio airplay	Mercury	
United States	November 14, 2017	Contemporary hit radio	Big Machine; Republic	
