= Dangerous Love (song) =

Single by Fuse ODG featuring Sean Paul

from the album TINA
- Released: 18 May 2014
- Recorded: 2013
- Genre: Afrobeats, dancehall
- Length: 3:57
- Label: 3 Beat Productions
- Songwriters: Nana Richard Abiona, Sean Paul
- Producer: Fuse ODG

Fuse ODG singles chronology
"Million Pound Girl (Badder Than Bad)" (2013)	"Dangerous Love" (2014)	"T.I.N.A." (2014)

Sean Paul singles chronology
"Bailando" (2014)	"Dangerous Love" (2014)	"Make My Love Go" (2016)

"Dangerous Love" is a single by English-Ghanaian Afrobeats recording artist Fuse ODG, featuring Jamaican rapper Sean Paul. The song was released in the United Kingdom as a digital download on 18 May 2014. The song peaked at number 3 on the UK Singles Chart, number 4 on the Scottish Singles Chart and number 55 on the Irish Singles Chart.

"Dangerous Love" was nominated for Best Song at the MOBO Awards 2014, following his win in 2013 for Best African Act.

== Charts ==
=== Weekly charts ===
Chart (2014)	Peak position
Ireland (IRMA)	22
Scotland Singles (OCC)	4
UK Singles (OCC)	3

=== Year-end charts ===
Chart (2014)	position
UK Singles (Official Charts Company)	52

== Certifications ==
Region	Certification	Certified units/sales
United Kingdom (BPI)	Platinum	600,000^{‡}
^{‡} Sales+streaming figures based on certification alone.

== Release history ==
Country	Date	Format	Label
United Kingdom	18 May 2014	Digital download	3 Beat Productions
