= Boa Me =

Single by Fuse ODG featuring Ed Sheeran and Mugeez

from the album New African Nation
- Released: 10 November 2017
- Recorded: 2017
- Length: 3:00
- Label: Off da Ground
- Songwriters: Nana Richard Abiona: Joseph Addison; Rashid Mugeez; Ed Sheeran

Fuse ODG singles chronology
"No Daylight" (2017)	"Boa Me" (2017)	"Do That" (2017)

Ed Sheeran singles chronology
"Perfect" (2017)	"Boa Me" (2017)	"End Game" (2017)

Mugeez singles chronology
"Only You" (2017)	"Boa Me" (2017)

"Boa Me" is a single by English-Ghanaian Afrobeats recording artist Fuse ODG, featuring vocals from Ed Sheeran and Mugeez. The song was released in the United Kingdom as a digital download on 10 November 2017. The song peaked at number 52 on the UK Singles Chart.

== Music video ==
The music video for "Boa Me" premiered on 16 November 2017.

== Track listing ==
Digital download
No.	Title	Length
1.	"Boa Me" (featuring Ed Sheeran and Mugeez)	3:00

== Charts ==
Chart (2017–18)	Peak position
New Zealand Heatseekers (RMNZ)	4
Scotland Singles (OCC)	92
UK Singles (OCC)	52

== Release history ==
Region	Date	Format	Label	Ref.
United Kingdom	10 November 2017	Digital download	Off da Ground	
United Kingdom	15 December 2017	Contemporary hit radio	Polydor	
