= Dentaa =

British-Ghanaian entertainer (born 1983)

Dentaa MBE
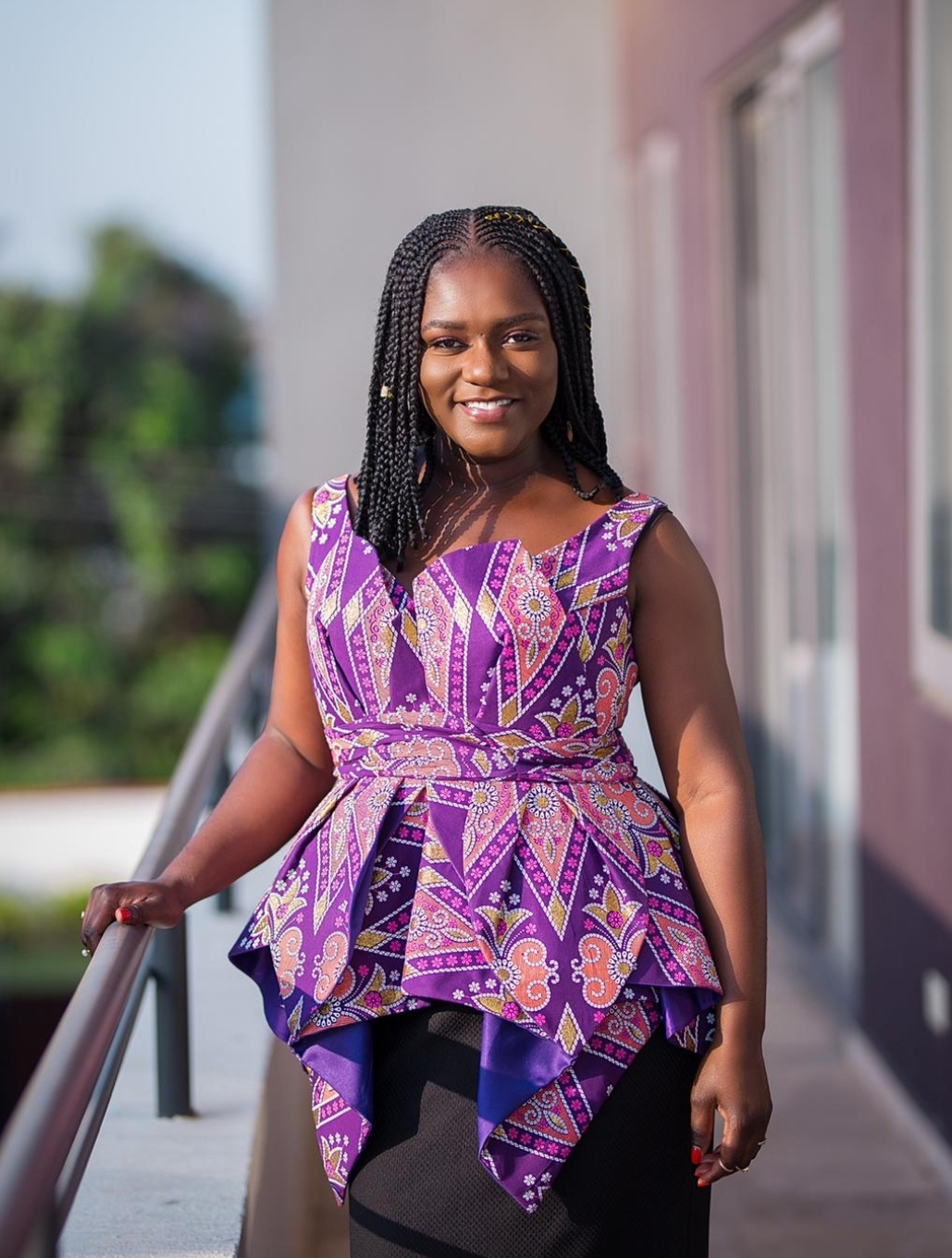
- Born: Akosua Dentaa Amoateng; 1983 (age 42–43); Juaso, Ghana
- Education: Walthamstow School for Girls; Leyton Sixth Form College; Buckinghamshire New University
- Occupations: Television presenter, actress, singer, entrepreneur
- Years active: 1995–present
- Known for: GUBA Awards
- Television: The Dentaa Show
- Children: 4

Akosua Dentaa Amoateng MBE (born 1983), best known by her stage name Dentaa, is a British Ghanaian entrepreneur, actress, TV presenter, singer, producer and manager. She was appointed a Member of the Most Excellent Order of the British Empire (MBE) in the 2016 Birthday Honours and in 2017, she received the Ghana Peace Awards Humanitarian Service Laureate in Accra, Ghana. In mid-September 2020, she was appointed by Asante Kotoko S.C. as their International Relations Manager.

As an actress, she appeared on British television shows including EastEnders and Holby City, before moving into presenting and hosting programmes on British and Ghanaian TV, including The Dentaa Show and reality TV music competition Mentor IV. She also had a brief career as a singer, releasing a gospel album in 2005, Wu Ye Nyame.

Dentaa is an advocate for the Ghanaian community in the UK, and the African Network of Entrepreneurs listed her in 2017 as one of 100 "Most Outstanding Women Entrepreneurs in Ghana" for her advocacy. In 2009 she founded the GUBA (Ghana UK Based Achievements) Awards, which recognises the achievements of individuals and organisations "positively contributing to the Ghanaian community in the UK or Ghana". In 2011, she was named in The Future 100 Awards as the "Young Social Entrepreneur" of the year for her work with GUBA.

In June 2013, Dentaa was announced as the winner of the annual African Women in Europe (AWE) Award, for her work in promoting Ghanaian achievement in the UK and for her charity work. Organisers described her as an "icon and role model to all African women living and working in Europe".

Dentaa is currently based in London, England.

== Early years and education ==
Dentaa was born in Juaso, in the Ashanti Region of Ghana, but at the age of five moved with her family to the UK. From a young age, she enjoyed performing in school plays and talent shows. She took her GCSEs at Walthamstow School for Girls and A-Levels (Media Studies, Sociology and Performing Arts) at Leyton Sixth Form College. She went on to study for a degree in paediatric nursing at Buckinghamshire New University.

== Music and television work ==
Between the late 1990s and early 2000s, Dentaa appeared on British TV dramas including EastEnders, Holby City, Judge John Deed, Run Baby Run, and Prime Suspect.

In 2005, she released a gospel album entitled Wu Ye Nyame, through Alordia Promotions and Goodies Music Production. The album received airplay on radio stations in Ghana, and Dentaa supported the release with a global tour.

=== The Dentaa Show ===
In 2006, Dentaa produced and fronted a new TV show for British ethnic minority channel OBE (Original Black Entertainment) TV called The Dentaa Show. The 30-minute syndicated magazine programme, broadcast on Sky Channel 155, was filmed in front of a live audience and split into three segments exploring the Ghanaian and African entertainment scene through interviews with celebrities, coverage of entertainment events and a focus on the latest music chart videos. The show was Ghana's most-watched entertainment programme. and in its first year, scored the highest ratings in first-run syndication in the 18 – 40 years demographic, out-performing established talk shows. The Dentaa Show ran for three seasons.

=== Other TV shows and hosting appearances ===
Dentaa co-hosted Miss Ghana UK in 2007 and the following year became a co-host on the fourth series of Mentor – Ghana's equivalent of The X-Factor — on Ghanaian TV channel TV3, alongside Kofi Okyere Darko (aka "KOD"). In 2009, she co-hosted the Ghana Music Awards, performing a duet with Batman Samini, and in 2010 presented Ghana's first make-over show, Darling Beauty Diaries. She did not, however, return for the fifth series of Mentor in 2010 as she was by then pregnant with her second child.

In August 2012, it was announced that Dentaa would be making a return to TV with new weekly show Dinner with Dentaa, which features celebrity guests cooking for her.

== GUBA Awards ==
Outside of broadcasting, Dentaa is known as the founder and CEO of non-profit organisation the Ghana UK Based Achievement (GUBA) Awards, which organises an annual awards ceremony in Britain recognising the "hugely significant" contribution that British-Ghanaians make to society. Dentaa founded the awards in 2009, with the first awards ceremony taking place in London, England, in October 2010. Dentaa, who describes herself as a "proud Ghanaian", had the idea to set up the awards as she felt that there was "nothing out there promoted and enriched my heritage".

GUBA was the first ceremony of its kind to specifically recognise Ghanaian achievement and has since been endorsed by dignitaries and organisations including the Ghana High Commission to the UK and Ireland, the British High Commission in Ghana, the Ghana Ministry of Tourism, former British Prime Minister Tony Blair and his wife Cherie, Lord Paul Boateng, Diane Abbott MP and FIFA President Sepp Blatter.

Dentaa's achievements with GUBA were acknowledged in 2011 when she was announced as one of the "Young Social Entrepreneurs of the Year" in the annual Future 100 Awards, and again in 2013 when she received the African Women in Europe (AWE) Award. Dentaa was nominated for two categories at the annual Women4Africa awards in London in May 2014, being adjudged best organizer of the year.

== Connection with professional football ==
Dentaa has a strong connection to the world of football. She is the Manager of Ghana and former Sunderland striker Asamoah Gyan, and played an "influential role" in helping Ghana's national football team, popularly known as the Black Stars, secure the services of Arsenal midfielder Emmanuel Frimpong.

In May 2012, she organised the launch of the Benjani Mwaruwari Foundation, set up by Portsmouth and Zimbabwe national football team striker Benjani Mwaruwari to build a football academy for underprivileged youths in Zimbabwe. The following month, in June 2012, Dentaa helped the Arthur Wharton Foundation present a statuette of Arthur Wharton — the first professional black football player – to FIFA President Sepp Blatter. The Arthur Wharton Marquette Statue is now displayed in the presidents' lounge at FIFA headquarters in Zurich.

Dentaa's work in the sporting arena was recognised in 2011, when she was nominated for the 2011 Black List Awards – a UK-based awards scheme that acknowledges the contribution of the black community for achievements across all levels of football, and which is supported by the Football Association, Professional Footballers' Association and Black Collective of Media in Sport (BCOMS), among others. Her management of Gyan and influence in the signing of Frimpong to the Ghana national team were "key factors" in her nomination.

== Personal life ==
Dentaa has four children: Nuquari, Awiyah Amoateng, Adansi Amoateng, and Enijie Amoateng Jr. Prominent among them is Awiyah, also known as Princess Awiyah, who at the age of six in 2018 launched her hair brand for children, following that up in 2020 with her Shea butter and black soap products.

== Selected honours ==
- 2013: Winner of African Women in Europe (AWE) Award
- 2016: Appointed Member of the Most Excellent Order of the British Empire (MBE) in the 2016 Birthday Honours
- 2017: Ghana Peace Awards Humanitarian Service Laureate
- 2025: honored with a diplomatic passport by the minister for foreign affairs(Ghana), Samuel Okudzeto Ablakwa through the ministry.
