= Azonto (Fuse ODG song) =

Single by Fuse ODG featuring Itz Tiffany

from the album TINA
- Released: 27 October 2013
- Recorded: 2013
- Genre: Afrobeats; dance
- Length: 2:43
- Label: 3 Beat
- Songwriters: Nana Richard Abiona; Tiffany Owusu
- Producers: KillBeatz; Fuse ODG; Theo Davis

Fuse ODG singles chronology
"Antenna" (2011)	"Azonto" (2013)	"Million Pound Girl (Badder Than Bad)" (2013)

"Azonto" is a single by Ghanaian-English Afrobeats recording artist Fuse ODG, featuring vocals from Itz Tiffany. The song was released in the United Kingdom as a digital download on 29 September 2013. The song peaked at number 30 on the UK Singles Chart and at number 38 on the Scottish Singles Chart. The song has also charted in the Netherlands. The song was written by Nana Richard Abiona and Tiffany Owusu. It was ranked #18 on Billboard's list of the 50 Best Afrobeats Songs of All Time.

== Music video ==
The official music video to accompany the single's release was uploaded to YouTube on 15 August 2013. Although another video was first uploaded on 27 October 2013, which has over 50 million views as of March 2025. There was an earlier music video, uploaded to YouTube on 27 April 2012. While the Azonto dance is a specifically African phenomenon, the music video insights international sentiment within it. African culture is juxtaposed with whiteness and more westernized tendencies. Fuse ODG himself wears African prints and giant clay beads, but also a statement cap and Aviators. Similarly, the featured dancers can be seen wearing clothes varying from dashikis to suits to rompers to jeans, displaying an incredible variety of global trends.

== Track listing ==
Digital download
No.	Title	Length
1.	"Azonto" (UK Radio Edit)	2:43
2.	"Azonto" (Cahill UK Radio Edit)	3:16
3.	"Azonto" (Cahill UK Club Mix)	5:28
4.	"Azonto" (Jus Now Remix feat. Kerwin Prescott & Serocee)	3:42
5.	"Everyday" (feat. Selasi)	3:13

== Charts ==
Chart (2013)	Peak positions
Netherlands (Single Top 100)	91
Scotland Singles (OCC)	38
UK Singles (OCC)	30

== Release history ==
Country	Date	Format	Label
United Kingdom	29 September 2013	Digital download	3 Beat Productions
