= GUBA Awards =

Awards celebrating African individuals and organizations

The GUBA Awards, or Grow, Unite, Build, Africa (GUBA) Awards, formerly known as the Ghana UK-Based Achievement Awards, are organized by GUBA Enterprise, a social enterprise dedicated to the support and advancement of Africans in the diaspora and on the continent through various socio-economic programmes and initiatives.

The awards event celebrates and rewards the excellence and innovation of African individuals and organizations working towards the advancement, empowerment, and progression of the African community in the Diaspora.

The GUBA Awards initially began as an annual awards ceremony in the United Kingdom with the goal of recognizing the "hugely significant" contribution that British-Ghanaians made to society.

Dentaa, a Ghanaian TV personality resident in the United Kingdom, launched the awards in 2009, with the first event held in London, England, in October 2010. Dentaa, GUBA President, got the idea to create the awards because she thought that "nothing out there" encouraged and appreciated the hard work and achievements of British Ghanaians.

The GUBA Awards was the first ceremony of its kind specifically to recognize Ghanaian achievement and the only awards to be endorsed by the Ghana High Commission in the UK and the British High Commission in Ghana. More recently, the organizers have sought to also involve the wider African communities as they attempt to gain international attention. The GUBA Awards ceremony attracts a high calibre of African political luminaries as well as business and entrepreneurial personalities.

In July 2013, the GUBA Awards received an International Corporate Social Responsibility (CSR) Excellence Award, beating more than 100 nominees from the UK corporate sector.

== Organisation ==
Categories in the GUBA Awards are divided into sections that represent the Ghanaian flag: Red (Business & Enterprise); Gold (Popular Culture); Green (Community) and Black Star (Recognition Awards).

Hundreds of recommendations for nominees are received annually. A vetting process is in place along with a clear criterion that each candidate has to satisfy prior to being accepted as a nominee. Only the activities of the candidates in the 12 months leading up to the awards are considered, so that everyone stands a fair chance.

A panel of judges comprising prominent members of the Ghanaian community is responsible for compiling the final shortlist of nominees. In both the 2010 and 2011 GUBA Awards there were three judges: Charles Thompson MBE (CEO of the Screen Nation Awards), singer Rhian Benson and solicitor Maame Biama Asante. For the 2012 awards there were four judges: Charles Thompson, Mavis Amankwah (managing director of communications firm Rich Visions), Freddy Annan (CEO for BASE Management Group) and Sandra Teichman (a director in the London arm of US law firm Pillsbury Winthrop Shaw Pittman).

For the GUBA Awards 2013, the categories were: Business of the Year; IIA Sustainability Award; Efie Ne Fie Award; Young Entrepreneur of the Year; Rising Star of the Year; Fashion Fusion Designer of the Year; Music Act of the Year; Ghanaian Association of the Year; Inspirational Personality of the Year; Unsung Hero of the Year; and Charity of The Year.

With the exception of the Recognition Awards category, the winners in each section are decided by public vote and announced at the awards ceremony.

== Directional shift ==
2019 marked a monumental moment for the GUBA Awards, with the awards being held for the first time in the United States. The awards were held in New York alongside the 74th UN General Assembly, which saw a change in direction of the awards' scope.

The 2019 United States edition of the GUBA Awards was held under the theme "African Diaspora, the Catalyst for Growth and Innovation".

In 2021, the awards were held in Ghana for the first time since its inception to celebrate the centenary of the death of Ghanaian historical warrior and hero Nana Yaa Asantewaa.

The 2023 award ceremony was held at London's Grosvenor House Hotel in November.

== GUBA Awards 2010 winners ==
The 2010 launch ceremony took place in London at the Ghana High Commission.

- Best Business – Kumasi Market.
- Best Entrepreneur/Innovator – Arnold Sarfo Kantanka: Me FiRi Ghana.
- Best African Fusion Designer – Ohema Ohene.
- Best Hair & Beauty – Josh Hair & Beauty.
- Best Restaurant – The Gold Coast.
- Best Shipping Company – Speedlink.
- Best DJ – Teddy Abrokwa.
- Best Radio Station – Rainbow Radio.
- Best TV Programming – The World's Strictest Parents.
- Best Media Personality – Ama K. Abebrese.
- Best Sports Personality – John Mensah
- Best Event – Ghana Party in the Park.
- Best Musician – Sonnie Badu.
- Best Association – GNA.
- Best Rising Star Award – Belinda Owusu.
- Best Student Achiever – Karen Boadu.
- Pioneer Award – Leticia Obeng.
- Recognition Award – Black Stars.
- Lifetime Achievement Award – Osibisa.

== GUBA Awards 2011 winners ==
The 2011 awards ceremony was held at the Ghana High Commission in London, with the winners being:

- Best Business – Tullow Oil
- Best Money Transfer – MoneyGram
- Best Shipping Company – Speedlink Travel and Freight
- Best Professional – Lady Gifty Tetteh
- Best Entrepreneur – Andy Ansah
- Best African Fusion – Yaa Ataa Couture Bags
- Best Radio Presenter – Owusu Frimpong
- Best Club DJ – Neptizzle
- Best Photographer – Ernest Simons
- Best Print Journalist – Joanna Abeyie
- Best African Sports Personality – Asamoah Gyan
- Best Charity Organisation – Ghana Education Project
- Best Association – Ghanaian Community in Bradford
- Rising Star Award – Fidel Frimpong
- Best Student Achiever – Vida Yiadom Boayke
- Special Achievement Award – Coz Ov Moni – First pidgin musical
- Special Achievement – James Barnor – 50-year photography career
- Special Achievement – Kwami Sefa Kayi – Popular running morning show in Ghana / 11 years
- Special Achievement – Samuel Awuni – Cocoa Farmer
- Lifetime Achievement – Lord Paul Boateng

== GUBA Awards 2012 winners ==
The 2012 awards ceremony was held at the Park Plaza Riverbank Hotel in central London.

Red – Business & Enterprise

- Ghana High Commission Award for Best Corporate Business – Armajaro Trading
- Best Professional – John Blavo (Blavo & Co)
- Efie Ne Fie (Home is Home) – Gloria Buckman Yankson (Plan It Ghana)

Gold – Popular Culture

- Best African Fusion Designer – Anita Quansah London – Anita Quansah
- Best Creative Writer – Dorothy Koomson
- Best Online Media – My Joy Online
- Best Emerging Music Act – Mista Silver

Green – Community

- Best Ghanaian Event – All White Party – Ghana Party in the Park (Akwaaba Promotions)
- Best Charity Organisation – WAM (What About Me) Campaign
- Rising Star Award – Philomena Kwao
- GUBA Humanitarian – James Annan (Challenging Height)
- GUBA Community Champion – Lorraine Wright

Black – Recognition Awards

- Best Student Achiever – Gillian Appau
- International Recognition Award – Patrick Quarcoo (Kenya-based media mogul)
- Inspirational African Award – Dr Mike Adebuga (Globacom)
- Special Achievement Award – Sam Jonah (Executive Chairman, Jonah Capital)
- Special Achievement Award – Sam Ankrah (Investment Broker)
- Special Achievement Award – Roland Agambire (Entrepreneur and owner of RLG)
- Special Achievement Award – Dennis Tawiah (Event Promotion Pioneer, CEO of Akwaaba Promotions)
- Sporting Achievement – John Mensah
- Posthumous Lifetime Achievement Award – (Shaun Campbell on behalf of) Arthur Wharton, the first professional black football player and the world 100-yard record holder.

== GUBA Awards 2013 winners ==
The 2013 award ceremony took place at the Park Plaza Riverbank Hotel in London.

Business & Enterprise

- Sustainable Business Award: Agro Mindset Organization (David Asiamah)
- Corporate Business of the Year: Vodafone
- RLG Development Award: Edward Amartey Tagoe
- Small Emerging Business Award: Sheabutter Cottage
- Young Entrepreneur Award: Edwin Kwaku Broni-Mensah.
- Efie Ne Fie Award: Debra-Jane Nelson (founder of Think| Mahogany)

Entertainment & Arts

- Music Artist of the Year award: Fuse ODG.
- African Fashion Designer of the Year: Duaba Serwa
- Young and Talented Award: Lewis Appiagyei, aspiring Formula 1 champion

Community

- Rising Star Award: Rebecca Amissah
- Charity of the Year award: Lively Minds, a charity that focuses on helping deprived children in rural areas in Ghana and in Eastern Uganda.
- Ghanaian Association of the Year: Merseyside Association of Ghanaians.

Special Achievement Awards

- GUBA Exceptional Achievement: Herman Chinery-Hesse
- GUBA Outstanding Achievement: Prince Kofi Amoabeng
- GUBA Community Champion: Archbishop Kwaku Manson
- GUBA Enterprise Mogul: Kanya King MBE
- Student Achiever Award: Jason Ochere, who graduated with 2.1 honours in Philosophy, Politics and Economics from the University of Manchester.

== GUBA Awards 2015 winners ==
The 2015 awards ceremony took place at the Hilton Metropole Hotel, Edgware Road, London, on 4 July.

Black Star Awards

- Amma Asante – Pioneering Director
- Rev Kingsley Appeagyei – GUBA Benevolence Award
- Dr Osei Kwame – Enterprise Mogul
- Dr Anthony Pile – British Service to Ghana Award
- Henry Bonsu – Outstanding Journalist and Broadcast Personality
- Nana Kwame Bediako – Business Entrepreneur Award
- Azumah Nelson – Sporting Legend
- Dr Kwabena Duffuor – Exceptional Achievement Award
- Prof Edward Ayensu – Life Time Achievement Award
- Idris Elba – Entertainment Icon
- Dr Joyce Rosalind Aryee – Inspirational Woman Nathan
- Kwabena Adisi aka Bola Ray – Media and Entertainment Award
- Mrs Kwansema Dumor on behalf of Komla Dumor –
- Peniel Enchill – GUBA Artist Extraordinaire Awards

Voting Awards 2015

- Timothy Amadi – GUBA Young and Talented Award
- Daniel Amoateng – GUBA Humanitarian Award
- Bradley Poku-Amankwah – Best Student Achiever
- Vanessa Hagan – Runner-Up: Best Student Achiever

== GUBA Awards 2017 winners ==
The 2017 awards ceremony was held at the Intercontinental Hotel in London.

- Ghanaian Alumni Award – Holy Child Past Students Association (HOPSA).
- Charity of the Year Award – Action Through Enterprise (ATE).
- Professional of the Year Award – Joshua Siaw.
- Made in Ghana Award – Peini Skincare.
- Efie Ne Fie Award – Vanetta & Vemilleon Ackah – Kiddie Garden Nursery International.
- Business Start-up of the Year – Purete Nature.

The GUBA Black Star Awardees

- Maidie Arkutu – Female Influential Leader Apostle.
- Dr Kwadwo Sarfo – Innovative Pioneer.
- Anas Aremeyaw Anas – Exceptional Journalist.
- Dr Michael K. Obeng – Humanitarian Spirit.
- Dr Papa Kwesi Nduom – Excellence in Business, Ghana.
- Mr & Mrs Mensah (Uncle John's Bakery) – Enterprising Business Award.
- Dr Kwaku Oteng – Outstanding Industrialist.
- Dr Kofi Amoa-Abban – Young Oil & Gas Entrepreneur.
- Kelvin Doe – Young African Innovator.
- Dr Nii Dzani – Influential Economist.
- Dr Jason Sarfo-Annin – Student Achiever of the Year.
- Mrs Ivy Manly-Spain – Female Excellence in Oil and Gas Award.
- Chris Hughton – Outstanding Achievement Award.

== GUBA Awards 2018 winners ==
- GUBA Association of the Year – Ghana Doctors and Dentists UK (GDDA-UK).
- GUBA Celebrity Humanitarian – Kwami Sefa Kayi, Kokrokoo Charities Foundation.
- GUBA Efie Ne Fie – Eric Andoh (STARBITES).
- GUBA Innovation and Technology – Nelplast Ghana Limited.
- GUBA Leisure and Tourism – The Royal Senchi Hotel and Resort.
- GUBA Professional of the Year – Charlotte Boaitey-Kwarteng.
- GUBA Rising Diasporan – Bernard Adjei.

Black Star Awardees 2018

- Lifetime Achievement Award – Ashitey Hammond.
- Rising Sports Star – Joshua Buatsi.
- Rising Star Award – Michael Dapaah.
- Music Excellence Award – Stormzy (Michael Omari).
- Special Achievement Award – Vandyke Appiah Kubi.
- Television and Film Pioneer Award – Ernest Abbeyquaye.
- Outstanding Leadership Award – Dr Cecilia Anim
- Outstanding Achievement Award – Attorney General Gloria Afua Akuffo and former Attorney General Merietta Brew Oppong.
- Outstanding Student Achiever Award – Samuel Afari.

== GUBA Awards 2021 winners ==
The 2021 GUBA Excellence Awards event was dedicated to celebrating a century of the transition of Yaa Asantewaa, Queen Mother of Ejisu, who led the Asante army to fight the British in 1900. The theme was "Celebrating a Symbol of Courage and Resilience", and the awards recognised all African women in the past century.

- GUBA Yaa Asantewaa Woman of Excellence Honour (in Economic Development) – Ngozi Okonjo-Iweala
- GUBA Yaa Asantewaa Woman of Impact Honour (Transtlantic Development) – Bozoma Saint John
- GUBA Yaa Asantewaa Woman in Leadership Honour – Epsy Campbell Barr
- GUBA Yaa Asantewaa Trailblazer Honour (In Media ) – Afua Hirsch
- GUBA Yaa Asantewaa Woman of Influence Honour – (in Business) - Serty Leburu
- GUBA Yaa Asantewaa Women of Spirit Honour – Hajia Rabiatu Abukari
  - Victoria Ama Bema Oppong
  - Margaret Asare
  - Mary Pramang
- GUBA Yaa Asantewaa Woman of Inspiration Honour – Dina Leeds
- GUBA Yaa Asantewaa Woman of Empowerment Honour (in Governance) – Diane Abbott
- GUBA Yaa Asantewaa Entertainment Mogul Honour – Nana Ama McBrown Mensah
- GUBA Yaa Asantewaa Woman of Enlightenment Honor (in Education) – Prof Nana Aba Appiah Amfo
- GUBA Yaa Asantewaa Woman of Elevation Honour – HD Kayra Harding
- GUBA Yaa Asantewaa Lifetime Achievement Honour (in World Music) – Angelique Kidjo
- GUBA Yaa Asantewaa Woman of Distinction Honour (in Health) – H.E. Oheneba Dr Lesley Opoku Ware
- GUBA Yaa Asantewaa Woman of Vision Honour (in Banking & Finance) – Dr Diane Karusisi

== GUBA Awards 2023 winners ==
- Media Impact Award – The Voice
- Media Excellence Award – June Sarpong
- Woman of Spirit Award – Margaret Busby
- Innovator of the Year Award – Lanny Smith
- Exemplary Woman in Leadership Award – Patricia Scotland
- Exceptional Leadership in Finance Award – Afua Kyei

== See also ==
- List of Ghanaian awards
