= Alkayida =

Ghanaian dance

Alkayida (also spelt Ashanti Twi: Alkaida), also known as Akayida, is a Ghanaian dance with an emphasis on side to side moves, incorporating upper and body gestures, and encouraging group routines as well as individual competition. Alkayida dance is intensively relaxed, intensively free-form, intensively involves footwork, and incorporates vast arrays of hip-life dance moves. It involves the swaying of the body along with hand and shoulder movements in a certain pattern. According to hiplife artist Guru who had a key role in popularizing the dance, the name of the dance should be written "Akayida".

== Choreography ==
The dance, spelt Alkayida, began as a slower dance with moves that seemed to be replicating the extremist group and more recently, the dance and rhythms have picked up pace and delivered colourful choreography and the “Alkayida”—often misspelled “Al Qaeda”—not only vies in unseating the azonto, but it inadvertently embeds the Ghanaian hip-life culture levity into the name of the terrorist group Al-Qaeda.

== Viral hit ==
The Alkayida dance craze has been associated with hip-life music icon Guru after he popularized the term in his hit song "Akayida (Boys Abrɛ)". "Brɛ" in the Ashanti language means "tired". In Guru’s song titled Alkayida, the response to the word Akayida is "boys abrɛ", and this catch phrase has gradually crawled its way into the vocabulary of the Akan youth.

Asamoah Gyan and the Black Stars squad were scheduled to showcase the "Alkayida" dance on the global stage at the 2014 World Cup. Gyan and the rest of the team danced after scoring a goal in the Germany vs. Ghana group stage match. It was, however, an Azonto dance and not Alkayida.

During 2014, Panamanian dancehall deejay Japanese alongside Honduran dancehall artist AlBeezy released the song "La Caída" ([la kaˈiða], "The Tumble"), using a similar instrumental to Guru's track but with unrelated lyrics (a common practice among Panamanian dancehall songs, which are often modeled after existing Jamaican dancehall songs. This is sometimes discouraged and deemed plagiarism), and featuring the same dance moves. This gave the dance a brief, minor raise of popularity in Panama and, to a much lesser extent, Guru's music and Azonto music overall.
