= Azonto =

Ghanaian dance and music genre

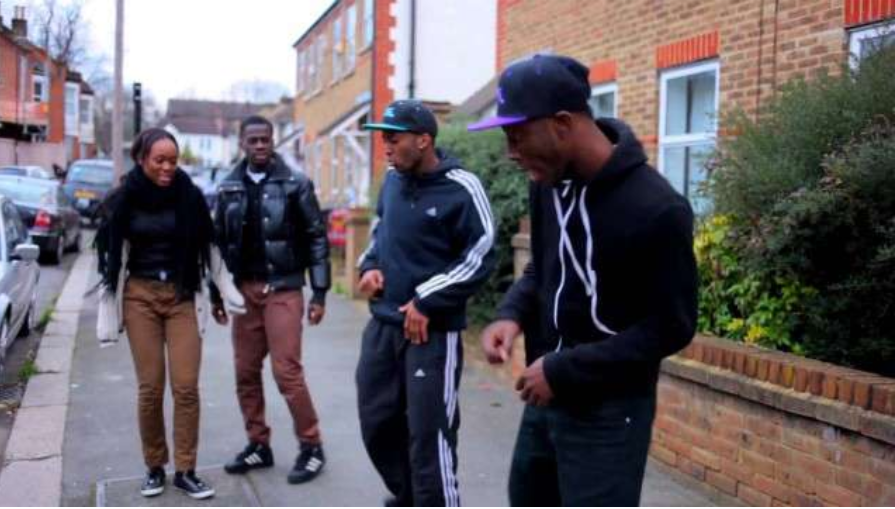
- Four people dancing Azonto
- Origin: Ghana

Azonto is a dance and music genre from Ghana. It is connected to the traditional Ga dance Kpanlogo, associated with the coastal towns in the country such as Chorkor, James Town, Teshie, Nungua and Tema, in the Greater Accra Region.

Several accounts say Azonto was formerly known as 'Apaa' in these communities. The Apaa dance, hence Azonto dance, involves a set of hand movements that either mimic everyday activities especially ones concerning people's livelihoods, or moves that are meant to amuse an audience.

For the basics of the dance, one foot is stiff and planted, while the other foot is on its ball to allow the dancer to pivot and twist. The dancer's shoulders are slouched, and their head is turned to one side with a "defiant and flirtatious" smirk on their face. The hands of the dancer point downwards and move in flowing, circular motions around themselves and the space in front of them, changing in levels from the head to the waist.

It began with one- or two-step movements but has been advanced to more complex and almost acrobatic movements Just like most African dances, Azonto involves knee bending and hip movements. The dance has effectively evolved from a few basic moves to miming actions such as ironing of clothes, washing, driving, boxing, praying, swimming, and others.

== History ==
Azonto is a communicative dance believed to originate from "Apaa" which literally means to work. Apaa was used to show the profession of an individual. The azonto dance has since grown further to relay coded messages. The dance later got into the minds of most Ghanaians. In 2013, most Ghanaian music videos were full of Azonto dance and later spread to most African countries and other parts of the world.

Popular music researcher Jesse Weaver Shipley claims that like hiplife, the popularity of Azonto is a direct result of its interactions in diaspora. Azonto is identified with Ghanaian indigeneity by those abroad and with cosmopolitanism by those at home"

== International popularity ==
Azonto can be traced as far back as one of R2Bees upcoming songs "Azonto" but was rejuvenated by Guru's Lapaz Toyota and later the producer NshonnaMusick with the song "U Go Kill Me" which had Sarkodie (rapper) and EL (rapper) on it. It was later popularized on social media by the music videos that portrayed the dance form with fast-pace tempos, home-made dance instructional videos uploaded on YouTube with no commercial intent, and group choreographers done by mostly Ghanaians and other African nationals living in UK, Germany and U.S.

Amateur videos of Azonto dancing by young Ghanians posted on YouTube in 2011 were central to its spread in Ghana and overseas, especially one montage of Azonto dance competitions set to “U Go Kill Me" in Accra high schools and a video of a boy onstage at the Ghanaian National Theatre dancing Azonto. Within a few months, "both received several hundred thousand hits" and were shared widely on Twitter and Facebook. Other Ghanians shared homemade Azonto dancing videos and shared them to YouTube, prompting other users to comment on, praise, and critique their dancing. The success of "U Go Kill Me", increasing popularity of Azonto dancing, and the community created for Azonto dancing encouraged other artists to create their own music in the genre.

== Tracks ==
The Most Popular Azonto Tracks of 2012
Track Title	Artiste	Album Title
"Lapaz Toyota"	Guru	
"You Go Kill Me"	Sarkodie (featuring E.L)	
"Dangerous"	Sarkodie	
"Zooze"	Koo Maanu (featuring No-Tyme)	
"Move To The Gyal Dem"	Donae'o (featuring Sarkodie)	
"Aboodatoi"	Gasmilla	
"Chop Kenkey"	Joey B	
"Twame Lala"	Stay Jay	
"Obuu Mo"	E.L	
"Kaluu"	E.L	
"Yenko Nkoaa"	Eduwodzi (featuring Stay J)	
"Azonto"	Fuse ODG (featuring Itz Tiffany)	
"Kolom"	Buk Bak	
"Sokode"	Keche	
"Body Lotion"	Keche	
"Azonto Ghost"	Bisa Kdei	
"Aluguntugui"	Keche	
"Moko Ni"	4x4	
"Antenna"	Fuse ODG	
"Seke"	Dr Slim (featuring Double)	
"Ayi"	Criss Waddle (featuring Bisa Kdei)	
"Azonto"	Wizkid	
'"Azonto''	R2BEES	

== See also ==
- Alkayida
- Kakalika
