= Million Pound Girl (Badder Than Bad) =

2013 single by Fuse ODG

Single by Fuse ODG

from the album TINA
- B-side: "Come Closer"
- Released: 29 December 2013
- Recorded: 2012
- Genre: Afrobeats, dancehall
- Length: 4:06 (single/album version); 3:05 (edit)
- Label: 3 Beat Productions
- Songwriters: Nana Richard Abiona, Joseph "Killbeatz" Addison
- Producer: Killbeatz

Fuse ODG singles chronology
"Azonto" (2013)	"Million Pound Girl (Badder Than Bad)" (2013)	"Dangerous Love" (2014)

"Million Pound Girl (Badder Than Bad)" is a single by Ghanaian-English Afrobeats recording artist Fuse ODG. The song was released in the United Kingdom as a digital download on 29 December 2013. The song debuted at number 14 on the UK Singles Chart, and peaked at number 5 the following week. It debuted at number 22 on the Scottish Singles Chart, peaking at number 11 the following week, and also reached number 65 on the Irish Singles Chart.

== Music video ==
A music video to accompany the release of "Million Pound Girl (Badder Than Bad)" was first released onto YouTube on 17 October 2013 at a total length of four minutes and thirty seconds.

== Track listings ==
Digital download – single
No.	Title	Length
1.	"Million Pound Girl (Badder Than Bad)"	4:06

Digital download – EP
No.	Title	Length
1.	"Million Pound Girl (Badder Than Bad)" (Steve Smart and Westfunk radio edit)	2:56
2.	"Million Pound Girl (Badder Than Bad)" (Rymez remix)	3:30
3.	"Million Pound Girl (Badder Than Bad)" (Konshens remix)	3:29
4.	"Come Closer" (featuring Wande Coal)	3:00

== Chart performance ==
=== Weekly charts ===
Chart (2014)	Peak positions
Ireland (IRMA)	65
Scotland Singles (OCC)	11
UK Singles (OCC)	5

=== Year-end charts ===
Chart (2014)	positions
UK Singles (Official Charts Company)	92

== Certifications ==
Region	Certification	Certified units/sales
United Kingdom (BPI)	Gold	400,000^{‡}
^{‡} Sales+streaming figures based on certification alone.

== Release history ==
Country	Date	Format	Label
United Kingdom	29 December 2013	Digital download	3 Beat Productions
