= Universidad Empresarial de Costa Rica =

Private university in Costa Rica

- Motto: Opportunitas (Latin)
- Motto in English: Opportunity
- Established: 1997
- Chancellor: William Zamora Gonzalez
- Location: San Jose, Costa Rica

Universidad Empresarial de Costa Rica, also known as UNEM or Business University of Costa Rica, is a private university in the city of San José, Costa Rica. It is approved by the Consejo Nacional de Enseñanza Superior Universitaria Privada, the national council of higher education of Costa Rica, to award undergraduate degrees in accounting and business administration, and master's degrees in business administration.

The degree programs offered by UNEM are not among those accredited by the Sistema Nacional de Acreditación de la Educación Superior (SINAES), the national accreditation agency of Costa Rica. SINAES offers a voluntary accreditation process to Costa Rican Universities and accredits degree programs rather than universities. Nineteen of the fifty-eight Costa Rican universities are accredited by SINAES.

UNEM is authorized by the Asesoria Legal del Ministerio de Educación No. ATJ-167-CONESUP to operate internationally, to offer international programs, and to grant bachelor's, master's and doctorate degrees with agreements with foreign universities

In 2013 the university was described by The Costa Rica Star as "infamous" for its involvement in several diploma mill allegations, in cases where students paid to receive degrees without following a course of study. The university has awarded PhD degrees to people in Germany and the United States. A 2008 investigation by Der Spiegel failed to find any legitimate campus or professors associated with UNEM.

== History ==
UNEM was founded in 1992 as an international graduate school, and acquired its present name and status in 1997.

The university reported no graduates in 2007, and enrolled no students in 2010; it may be inactive.

Hun Sen, the Cambodian prime minister, was made an "Honorary Professor of Diplomatic and International Relations" in July 2008.

Also in 2008, Yahya Jammeh, president of The Gambia, was awarded an Universidad Empresarial honorary professorship in traditional medicine by the International Parliament for Safety and Peace, a private Italian organisation.

== Rankings ==
Universidad Empresarial de Costa Rica was not among the five hundred top universities world-wide in the Times Higher Education World University Rankings for 2014–15, nor among the top five hundred in the Shanghai Academic Ranking of World Universities for 2014. It was not among the eight hundred universities in the QS World University Rankings for 2014, nor is it among the thirteen Costa Rican universities listed by Quacquarelli Symonds.

In the 2012 Classbase rating of web presence, it was not among the top one hundred universities in Latin America; it was rated eleventh of the thirteen universities listed for Costa Rica.
