= R2Bees =

Ghanaian music duo

- Origin: Tema, Ghana
- Genres: Hip hop; hiplife; Afrobeats; highlife
- Occupations: Singer, songwriter
- Years active: 2007–present
- Labels: R2Bees; Starboy
- Members: Faisal Hakeem; Rashid Mugeez

R2Bees is a Ghanaian hip hop and hiplife duo from Tema, comprising two cousins, Faisal Hakeem and Rashid Mugeez. They were nominated for the 2013 BET Awards. In March 2019, the duo released their third studio album, Site 15.

== Career ==
=== 2007–2012: Da Revolution I ===
R2BEES's first single, "Yawa Gal", was released in August 2008. They then went on to release "I Dey Mad", which featured Unda melodies. The song topped most Ghanaian Radio Music Charts for weeks. In 2010, R2Bees released "Kiss Your Hand" as their third single.

In 2009, R2Bees released a 17-track album Da Revolution, which has already released songs; "Yawa Girl", "I dey Mad", "T.E.M.A", "Kiss Your Hand" with new songs; "Radio", "One more Chance" and "Africa" with production from KillBeatz (Joseph Addison) as well as guest appearances from Wande Coal, Sarkodie, Samini, Kwaw Kese and a host of others.

=== 2013–present: Da Revolution II: Refuse to be Broke ===
Their second studio album, Refuse To Be Broke – Da Revolution II, was released on 29 March 2013. The album had guest appearances from Wizkid, Sherifa Gunu, Davido, Tinchy Stryder, Nana Boroo and Voicemail. The album's production was entirely handled by KillBeatz. The album's lead single "Ajeei" featuring Nana Boroo and Sarkodie was released on 20 July 2011. A remix EP was released on 13 August 2012. The second single, "Dance", features Wizkid, was released on 10 February 2012. Da Revolution II's third single "Odo" was released on 24 July 2012. "Life (Walaahi)" was released as the album's fourth single, and is an introspective track about R2Bees' life and the "general state of being". The album's fifth single "Bayla Trap" featuring Sarkodie was released on 2 November 2012. The music video for "Bayla Trap" was released on 29 November 2012; it was shot on location in Tema and directed by 6miludo Media. It received a nomination for Hip Life/Hip Hop Song of the Year at the Vodafone Ghana Music Awards. The sixth single released off the album, "It's Alright", was released on 19 March 2013. The Wizkid-assisted "Slow Down" released on 8 April 2013 as the album' seventh single. Its music video, directed by Gorilla Films, released on 1 July 2013. "Slow Down" was nominated for Best Collaboration of the Year and Vodafone Song of the Year at the Vodafone Ghana Music Awards. R2Bees released their first official single for 2014, "Lobi". The highlife influenced song video was released on 25 September 2014.

== Recognition and music style ==
R2Bees often sing and rap in their native language Twi and Pidgin. R2Bees is one of the top purveyors of Ghanaian hip pop subgenre hiplife, which mixes rap with sounds of highlife (African pop music) and reggae. In 2012, R2Bees was featured in the Forbes list of "African celebrities to watch in 2013". R2Bees have performed on the same stage with international musicians such as American R&B singers Mario and J Holiday.

== Discography ==
=== Studio albums ===
- Da Revolution I (2009)
- Da Revolution II: Refuse to be Broke (2012)
- Omar Sterling – Victory Through Harmony (2017)
- Site 15 (2019)
- Back 2 Basics (2021)

== Awards and nominations ==
=== BET Awards ===
Year	Nominee / work	Award	Result
BET Awards 2013	R2Bees	Best International Act: Africa|	Nominated

=== Ghana Music Awards ===
Year	Nominee / work	Award	Result
2015	R2Bees	Group of the Year	Nominated
2015	"Lobi"	Highlife Song of the Year	Nominated
2015	"Killing Me Softly"	Afro Pop Song of the Year	Nominated
2014	R2Bees	Group of the Year	Won
2014	R2Bees	Hiplife/Hip Hop Artiste of the Year	Nominated
2014	R2Bees	Artist of the Year	Nominated
2014	"Slow Down" (featuring Wizkid)	Best Collaboration of the Year	Nominated
2014	"Slow Down" (featuring Wizkid)	Vodafone Song of the Year	Nominated
2013	R2Bees	Artiste of the Year	Won
2013	R2Bees	Hiplife/Hip Hop Artiste of the Year	Won
2013	R2Bees	Group of the Year	Won
2013	"Slow Down" (featuring Wizkid)	Best Collaboration of the Year	Won
2013	"Life (Walaahi)"	Vodafone song of the Year	Won
2013	"Odo"	Highlife Song of the Year	Won
2013	"Bayla Trap" (featuring Sarkodie)	Hip Life/Hip Hop Song of the Year	Nominated
2013	"Odo"	Male Vocal Performance	Nominated
2013	Mugeez	Songwriter of the Year	Nominated
2011	"Kiss Your Hand" (featuring Wande Coal)	Afro Pop Song of the Year	Won
2011	"Kiss Your Hand" (featuring Wande Coal)	Collaboration of the Year	Won
2011	R2Bees	Hip Hop/Hiplife Artist of the Year	Nominated

=== The Headies ===
Year	Nominee / work	Award	Result
2013	R2Bees	Best African Artiste	—N/a
2014	R2Bees	Best African Artiste	Nominated

=== Nigeria Entertainment Awards ===
Year	Nominee / work	Award	Result
2013	R2Bees	Western African Artist or Group of the Year	Nominated
2014	R2Bees	African Artist of the Year (Non-Nigerian)	Nominated

== Selected videography ==
Year	Title	Director	Ref
2015	Gboza Featuring Davido	Justin Campos of Gorilla Films	
2016	Tonight Featuring Wizkid	Sesan Ogunro	
2017	Plantain Chips	ThisIsbutta	
