= Fuse ODG =

Ghanaian-English singer, songwriter and rapper (born 1988)

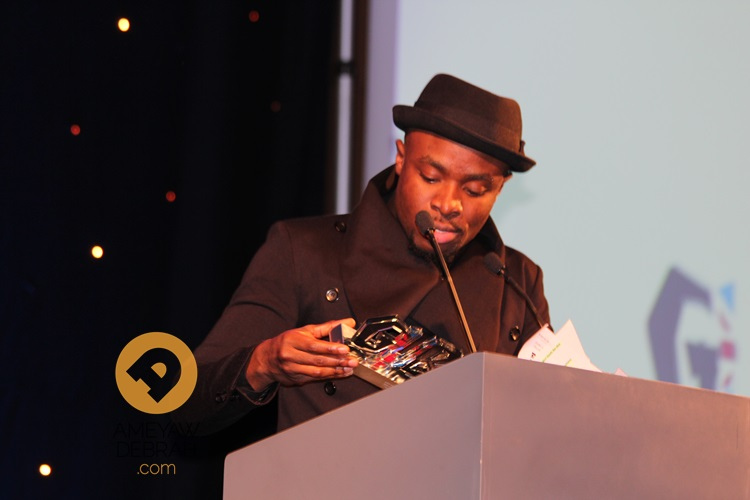
- Fuse ODG at an event in 2014

Background information
- Born: Nana Richard Abiona; 2 December 1988 (age 37); Tooting, London, England
- Origin: Mitcham, London, England
- Genres: Afrobeats; reggae; dance; hip hop
- Occupations: Singer; songwriter; rapper
- Years active: 2011–present
- Labels: 3Beat; Off da Ground
- Website: fuseodg.com

Nana Richard Abiona (born 2 December 1988), better known by his stage name Fuse ODG, is a Ghanaian-English singer, songwriter and rapper. He came to attention with his first Top-10 song on the UK singles chart, "Antenna" (#7 in 2013), and for his second last Top-10 on that chart, "Dangerous Love" (#3 in 2014). He also featured on Major Lazer's "Light It Up (Remix)", which reached No. 73 on the US Billboard Hot 100 in 2016.

In addition to his musical career he is a vocal proponent of people of African descent learning about Africa and has launched a subscription-based educational app "School of new Africa" for the purpose.

== Early life ==
Born in London and raised in Ghana, Fuse returned to London for his secondary education, where he attended the Archbishop Lanfranc School, Croydon. He grew up in Mitcham, South London. The stage name "Fuse" comes from his fusion of musical styles, as he is known for his unusual combination of genres such as Afro-pop, hip-hop, R&B, funk and rock. "ODG", meanwhile, stands for "Off Da Ground".

After returning to London, Fuse faced bullying as an adolescent because of his Ghanaian accent. He started making music as a way to connect with his peers and gain social status. He had a studio setup in his bedroom, and initially made music that was primarily influenced by American hip-hop, but was also informed by African genres such as Ghanaian highlife. Fuse also took influence from Black British genres including grime and UK garage, and was specifically inspired by the UK garage and hip-hop collective So Solid Crew. Other influences included Ghanaian rappers like Obrafour, Reggie Rockstone and Lord Kenya. Fuse was part of a rap crew at his school called 2 Gully, and he began to take music more seriously after they performed at an open mic competition at Fairfield Halls.

== Music career ==
=== 2011–14: T.I.N.A. ===
On 27 October 2011, he released the single "Azonto", which peaked at number 30 on the UK Singles Chart. On 23 August 2012, Fuse ODG released a single titled "Antenna". The song peaked at number 7 on the UK Singles Chart and at number 85 on the Irish Singles Chart. Fuse ODG released his debut EP The Buzz on 16 September 2012. On 19 October 2013, he was awarded Best African Act at the MOBO Awards' 18th Anniversary. He recently won four awards at the Urban Music Awards 2013: Best Music Video, Best Single, Best Artiste and Best Collaboration. On 29 December 2013 he released the single "Million Pound Girl (Badder Than Bad)". The song peaked at number 5 on the UK Singles Chart and at number 65 on the Irish Singles Chart. On 18 May 2014 Fuse ODG released "Dangerous Love", featuring Sean Paul. It peaked at number 3 on the UK Singles Chart. His next single, "T.I.N.A.", featuring British R&B artist Angel, was released on 19 October 2014. His debut album, T.I.N.A., an acronym for "This Is New Africa", was released on 3 November 2014 and includes all five singles. The album peaked at number 25 on the UK Albums Chart and at number 63 in Scotland. Fuse ODG turned down an offer to sing on the Band Aid 30 project because he objected to the way the lyrics of the song portrayed the victims of the ongoing Ebola virus epidemic in West Africa, and Africa generally.

=== 2015–present ===
In April 2015 he featured on Tinchy Stryder's single "Imperfection". In July 2015 he released the single "Only". He features on Angel's single "Leyla". The song was released on 17 July 2015. On 4 September 2015 he released the single "Top of My Charts".

In 2016, he collaborated with British Asian artist Zack Knight and Indian rapper Badshah. They came together and composed an African/Indian soundtrack, Bombae.

== Discography ==
=== Albums ===
Title	Details	Peak chart positions		Certifications
Title	Details	UK	SCO	Certifications
T.I.N.A.	Released: 3 November 2014; Label: 3Beat; Format: Digital download, CD	25	63	BPI: Silver
New Africa Nation	Released: 26 April 2019; Label: Off da Ground; Format: Digital download, streaming	—	—	

=== Singles ===
==== As lead artist ====
Title	Year	Peak chart positions						Certifications	Album
Title	Year	UK	BEL (Fl)	BEL (Wa)	IRE	NL	SCO	Certifications	Album
"Antenna"	2013	7	87	78	85	—	9	BPI: Platinum	T.I.N.A.
"Azonto" (featuring Itz Tiffany)	2013	30	—	—	—	91	38		T.I.N.A.
"Million Pound Girl (Badder Than Bad)"	2013	5	—	—	65	—	11	BPI: Gold	T.I.N.A.
"Dangerous Love" (featuring Sean Paul)	2014	3	—	—	22	—	4	BPI: Platinum	T.I.N.A.
"T.I.N.A." (featuring Angel)	2014	9	—	—	91	—	8	BPI: Silver	T.I.N.A.
"Thinking About U" (featuring Killbeatz)	2015	74	—	—	—	—	93		T.I.N.A.
"Only"	2015	—	—	—	—	—	—		Non-album singles
"Top of My Charts"	2015	—	—	—	—	—	—		Non-album singles
"BomBae" (with Zack Knight & Badshah)	2016	—	—	—	—	—	—		Non-album singles
"Jinja"	2016	—	—	—	—	—	—		Non-album singles
"Mary Mary" (featuring Big Narstie)	2017	—	—	—	—	—	—		Non-album singles
"Diary" (featuring Tiwa Savage)	2017	—	—	—	—	—	—		Non-album singles
"Window Seat"	2017	—	—	—	—	—	—		Non-album singles
"No Daylight"	2017	—	—	—	—	—	—		Non-album singles
"Boa Me" (featuring Ed Sheeran & Mugeez)	2017	52	—	—	99	—	92		New African Nation
"Feels Like Home" (with Sigala and Sean Paul featuring Kent Jones)	2018	71	—	—	52	—	62		Brighter Days
"Island"	2018	—	—	—	—	—	—		New Africa Nation
"Lazy Day" (featuring Danny Ocean)	2019	—	—	—	—	—	—		TBA
"—" denotes single that did not chart or was not released in that territory.

== Awards and nominations ==
Year	Event	Prize	Recipient	Result	Ref
2014	MOBO Awards	Best Male Act	Himself	Nominated	
2014	MOBO Awards	Best African Act	Himself	Won	
2014	MOBO Awards	Best Song	"Dangerous Love" (featuring Sean Paul)	Nominated	
2014	African Muzik Magazine Awards	Best Male Diaspora	Himself	Won	
2014	African Muzik Magazine Awards	Song of the Year	"Antenna" (featuring Wyclef Jean)	Nominated	
2014	MTV Africa Music Awards 2014	Best Pop	Himself	Nominated	
2014	Ghana Music Awards	Afro Pop Song of the Year	"Million Pound Girl (Badder Than Bad)"	Won	
2014	Ghana Music Awards	Vodafone Song of the Year	"Million Pound Girl (Badder Than Bad)"	Nominated	
2014	Ghana Music Awards	Vodafone Song of the Year	"Down on One" (Sarkodie featuring Fuse ODG)	Nominated	
2014	Ghana Music Awards	Best Collaboration of the Year	"Down on One" (Sarkodie featuring Fuse ODG)	Nominated	
2014	World Music Awards	World's Best Male Artist	Himself	Nominated	
2014	World Music Awards	World's Best Live Act	Himself	Nominated	
2014	World Music Awards	World's Best Entertainer of The Year	Himself	Nominated	
2013	Channel O Music Video Awards	Most Gifted Dance Video	"Antenna" (featuring Wyclef Jean)	Nominated	
2013	Ghana Music Awards	Afro Pop Song of the Year	"Antenna" (featuring Wyclef Jean)	Won	
2013	Ghana Music Awards	Song of the Year	"Antenna" (featuring Wyclef Jean)	Nominated	
2013	MOBO Awards	Best African Act	Himself	Won	
2019	Ghana Music Awards UK	UK based Ghanaian International Artist	Himself	Won	
