= Ghanaians in the United Kingdom =

Ghanaian diaspora in the UK

Ghanaians in the United Kingdom (Ghanaian British/British Ghanaians/Ghanaian Britons)
Total population
- Ghanaian-born residents 135,854 (2021–2022 censuses); Ethnic Ghanaians: 112,866 (England and Wales only, 2021 census)

Regions with significant populations
- London, Manchester, Birmingham, Milton Keynes, Swansea

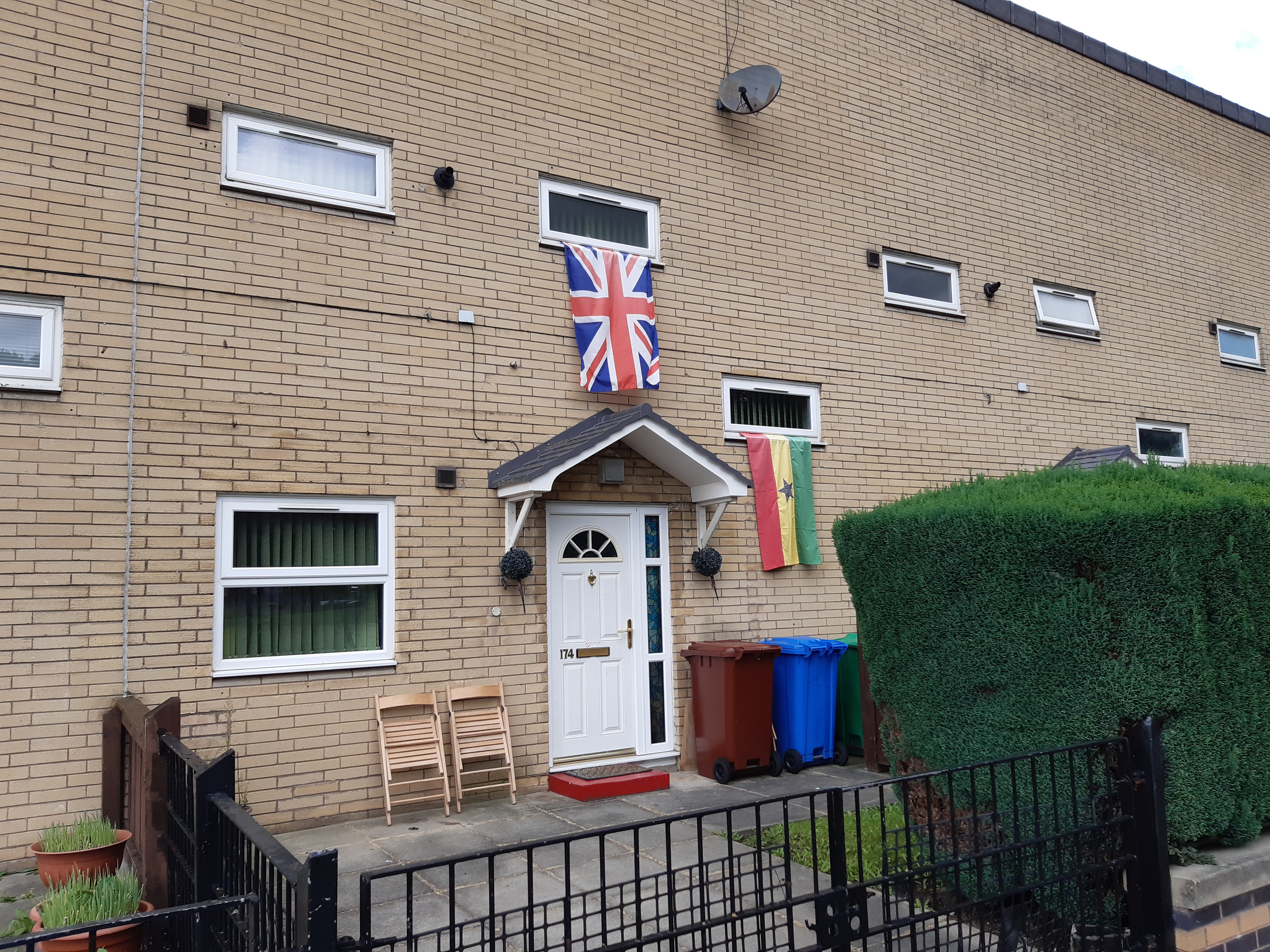
A UK and Ghanaian flag displayed side by side from a property in Moss Side, Manchester

Ghanaians in the United Kingdom (also British Ghanaians) encompass both Ghana-born immigrants and their descendants living in the United Kingdom. Immigration to the UK accelerated following the independence of Ghana from the British Empire in 1957, with most British Ghanaians having migrated to the UK between the 1960s to the 1980s owing to poor economic conditions at home.

The 2021–2022 United Kingdom censuses recorded 135,854 people born in Ghana living in the UK, up from 95,666 in 2011.

== History ==
=== Early ===
Although modern Ghana gained independence from the United Kingdom in 1957 and was the first African country to do so, small numbers of people from that region have been arriving and living in Britain since at least the mid-16th century. At that time, there were many Africans living and working in London, some of whom were based at the royal court.

In 1555, John Lok, a London merchant and Alderman, brought five Africans from the town of Shama, in what is present-day Ghana, to London to be trained as interpreters in order to assist England's trade with the western coast of Africa. From that time onwards, economic links were established between West Africa and England. The English were most concerned with acquiring gold from the region that came to be known as the Gold Coast. Pepper and other spices were also much in demand in Europe.

Besides a number of West Africans arriving in Britain during the 16th–18th centuries, there were Britons who went to the Gold Coast and married Ghanaian women. Some Ghanaians have Scottish and English ancestry, since a number of Scots and Englishmen married in local customary ceremonies and had children who became successful, such as Gold Coast's James Bannerman and Robert William Wallace Bruce. Most Scottish and English settlers left the Gold Coast after it won independence.

=== Modern ===
By the 1980s and early-1990s, 10 to 20 per cent of Ghanaians were living outside Ghana, with many migrating to other countries in Africa, the Middle East, the United States and Europe from the 1970s to the 1980s due to poor economic conditions at those times in Ghana.

== Culture ==
=== Film, television and theatre ===
Ghanaian British actors such as Freema Agyeman, Cynthia Addai-Robinson, Idris Elba and Peter Mensah have successfully crossed over into the international market and work in Hollywood. Adjoa Andoh is also noted for her work in theatre, and other actors of note include Paapa Essiedu, Hugh Quarshie and Peter Mensah.

Notable filmmakers include John Akomfrah, Amma Asante, Yaba Badoe and Kodwo Eshun.

=== Literature ===
Among those who have made a mark in the field of literature in the UK, as journalists, writers, and publishers, are such names as Cameron Duodu, Afua Hirsch, Derek Owusu, Ekow Eshun, Margaret Busby and Nii Ayikwei Parkes.

=== Music ===
Ghanaian music and musicians have a strong influence on the overall Ghanaian British community as well as British music in general, from traditional Ghanaian music to Afrobeats, hip-hop and grime, the UK has produced many fine artists. The Ghana Music Awards UK began in 2002 with an aim to promote and award the best achieving Ghanaian British musicians. By the 1980s, the UK was experiencing a boom in African music as Ghanaians and others moved there, immediately they made their presence felt in the form of local gigs and carnivals, and to this day Ghanaians and other African groups prevail as the most successful ethnic groups in the UK R&B and rap scene.

Artists such as Stormzy, Dizzee Rascal and Fuse ODG are household names in the UK and have won numerous awards, Tinchy Stryder, Donae'o, Oxide & Neutrino, Abra Cadabra, Headie One, Sway DaSafo, Tempa T, Lethal Bizzle, Novelist and The Mitchell Brothers have also received numerous nominations and awards (including the MOBO Awards, Mercury Prize and BET Awards). Another notable Ghanaian British musician who chose to stray away from the typical hip-hop scene is Rhian Benson, who now lives in Los Angeles and is noted for being a singer-songwriter, composer, instrumentalist and record producer who performs mainly jazz and soul music.

=== Cuisine ===
Zoe Adjonyoh, UK-born of Ghanaian heritage, is a writer and chef who founded the restaurant "Zoe's Ghana Kitchen" in London and is the author of a cookbook of the same title.

=== Other ===
Miss Ghana UK is a beauty pageant that has been up and running since 1992, it aims to highlight Ghana's rich cultural heritage. Attendances per show attracted more than 3,000 by the year 2009.

In London, Ghana's Official Independence Celebration is a celebration of the African nation's independence. The event was founded by Abrantee Boateng also known as DJ Abrantee and business partners, Alordia and Edmond in 2000.

The GUBA Awards, formerly known as the "Ghana UK-Based Achievement Awards", were founded in 2009 by UK-based Ghanaian TV personality Dentaa to promote and celebrate the successes of British Ghanaians. Those honoured have included photographer James Barnor, who was presented with a "Lifetime Achievement" award in 2011.

== Demographics ==
=== Population ===
At the time of the 1961 United Kingdom census, around 10,000 people born in Ghana were resident in the UK. The 2001 UK census recorded 56,112 Ghanaian-born people. The 2011 UK census recorded 93,312 Ghanaian-born residents in England, 534 in Wales, 1,658 in Scotland, and 162 in Northern Ireland. The Office for National Statistics estimates that the Ghanaian-born population of the UK was 114,000 in 2019.

In the 2021 UK census, 131,753 people in England were recorded as having been born in Ghana, as well as 824 people in Wales, and 231 in Northern Ireland. The census in Scotland was delayed by a year until 2022 and recorded 3,046 residents born in Ghana.

=== Distribution ===
Most Ghanaians in the UK live in Greater London. At the time of the 2011 census, the largest Ghanaian-born populations were found in the London boroughs of Lambeth, Southwark, Croydon, Newham, Barnet, Enfield, Hackney, Haringey, Lewisham, Waltham Forest, Brent and Barking and Dagenham, and in Milton Keynes, the county of West Midlands, and Greater Manchester.

=== Education ===
Within the British-Ghanaian community, emphasis on high educational and academic achievement is highly regarded. Ghanaian parents place a strong parental commitment on the further education of their children in the British education system. Due to the strong value and emphasis within broader Ghanaian society on higher education, academics, and intellectual development, there is a general expectation of British-Ghanaian pupils to attend university or other institutions of higher education.

According to the Institute for Public Policy Research, British-Ghanaian pupils are among the best-performing student groups in the United Kingdom, gaining 5 A*–C grades at GCSE (including math and English), performing above the national average.

== See also ==
- Ghana-United Kingdom relations
- Black Scottish people
- Ghanaian Australian
- Ghanaian American
- Black British people

== Bibliography ==
- Herbert, Joanna; May, Jon; Wills, Jane; Datta, Kavita; Evans, Yara; McIlwaine, Cathy (2008). "Multicultural living? Experiences of everyday racism among Ghanaian migrants in London". European Urban and Regional Studies. 15 (2): 103–117. Bibcode:2008EURS...15..103H. doi:10.1177/0969776407087544. S2CID 145803195.
