= World Best (album) =

Studio album by Patoranking
- Released: 6 September 2023
- Genre: Afrobeats; afropop; dancehall; highlife; reggae; amapiano; hip-hop; pop; EDM
- Length: 48:50
- Label: Amari Musiq
- Producer: Phantom; Blaq Jerzee; N2theA; Yung Willis; Killertunes; C-Tea; Dot Inc; Kel-P; Mix Master Garzy; Biggie Jazzy; DJ Breezy; Joshua Moszi

Patoranking chronology
Three (2020)	World Best (2023)

Singles from World Best
- 1. "Kolo Kolo" Released: 9 September 2022; 2. "Abobi" Released: 17 February 2023; 3. "Tonight" Released: 13 July 2023; 4. "Higher" Released: 16 August 2023

World Best (stylized in all caps) is the fourth studio album by Nigerian singer Patoranking. It was released on 6 September 2023, through Amari Musiq, and features guest appearances from Diamond Platnumz, Kizz Daniel, Beenie Man, Gyakie, Victony, Ludacris, Popcaan, and Zion Foster. Production was handled by Phantom, Blaq Jerzee, N2theA, Yung Willis, Killertunes, C-Tea, Dot Inc, Kel-P, Mix Master Garzy, Biggie Jazzy, DJ Breezy, and Joshua Moszi. It follows up to Three (2020).

== Background ==
World Best was released after a three-year hiatus following Patoranking's third studio album, Three (2020). He began working on the album a year after completing Three, aiming for a sound that shows his growth as an artist.. Patoranking described World Best as a project that "brings the world into it", featuring collaborations with international artists Ludacris and Popcaan, along with African musicians Kizz Daniel and Diamond Platnumz. The album title came from a nickname used by his friends and fans and reflects his journey. Patoranking said listeners should see themselves as "world best" in their own fields, adding, "My musical journey hasn't always been an easy one, but still we rise".

== Singles ==
World Best was supported by four singles. The lead single, "Kolo Kolo" features Diamond Platnumz and was released on 9 September 2022. The song, produced by Yung Willis, premiered alongside its music video, which was filmed in Dar es Salaam by Dammy Twitch. The second single, "Abobi", was released on 17 February 2023. It was produced by Kel-P and its accompanying music video was directed by Dammy Twitch. The song addresses violence and social injustice in Nigeria, telling the story of an innocent man caught in the crossfire and reflecting on the cycle of violence and its impact on communities.

The album's third single, "Tonight", featuring Jamaican artist Popcaan, was released on 13 July 2023. It blends Afrobeats and dancehall and was produced by DJ Breezy. The song incorporates galala rhythms and features a carefree message of living in the moment. In the music video, directed by Charlie Sarsfield, Patoranking and Popcaan are seen enjoying a party in an English countryside mansion. The fourth and final single "Higher" was released on 16 August 2023, with an accompanying music video. The song was produced by Mix Master Garzy, and the music video, directed by Chris Chuky, is set in a church where Patoranking joins a congregation in a celebration of gratitude and resilience, reflecting themes of thankfulness in his career. In a press statement, he expressed pride in his journey and encouraged listeners to "take delight in giving thanks for all God has done".

== Critical reception ==
Professional ratings
Review scores
Source	Rating
NotJustOk	6.5/10
Premium Times	7/10
Pulse Nigeria	6.8/10

Pulse Nigeria's Adeayo Adebiyi called World Best a "sonically predictable and boringly familiar project", linking it to "predictability and lack of artistic evolution". He said his style was "stuck in the preceding era" and concluded that he "would have to find the next gear should he desire to retain his relevance", rating the album 6.8/10. Esther Kalu of Premium Times characterized World Best as "a delicacy you probably eat every time and get too used to its taste". She concluded that "the album is worth listening to, as a few songs still compensate for the time spent", rating it a 7/10.

Betty Godson of NotJustOk said World Best was "a dancehall album sure to get listeners on the dancefloor" and described it as "a picture of dancehall fusion mastery", while also noting that "the album is an enjoyable body of work" but its listening experience was affected because "the songs do not blend seamlessly into each other". She concluded that "the album is an enjoyable body of work" and rated it a 6.5/10. Writers of The Native shared their opinions about World Best, with Dimeji calling it "a really solid body of work", Emmanuel describing it as "Patoranking's magnum opus", noting that "each record has something to say", and Chigoziri adding that it "lives up to its title". Gabriel Hansen of Music in Africa wrote that the album was "rooted in Patoranking's trusted reggae-dancehall style" and described it as "a platter of sounds from both sides of the Atlantic", while noting it "swims in thematic diversity and excellent production". He also said it "can feel disjointed due to its fragmented genre focus", concluding that "World Best is enjoyable but only after multiple spins".

== Track listing ==
World Best track listing
No.	Title	Writer(s)	Producer(s)	Length
1.	"Inshallah"	Patrick Okorie	Dot Inc	3:15
2.	"Higher"	Okorie	Mix Master Garzy	3:11
3.	"Gyal Like You" (featuring Kizz Daniel)	Okorie; Oluwatobiloba Anidugbe	Killertunes	3:12
4.	"Woman of the Year" (featuring Zion Foster)	Okorie; Zion Foster	N2theA	3:09
5.	"Smoke & Vibes"	Okorie	Blaq Jerzee	3:39
6.	"Tonight" (featuring Popcaan)	Okorie; Andrae Sutherland	DJ Breezy; Mix Master Garzy^{[b]}	3:16
7.	"Abobi"	Okorie	Kel-P	3:21
8.	"Miracle Baby" (featuring Ludacris)	Okorie; Christopher Bridges	Phantom	3:23
9.	"Babylon" (featuring Victony)	Okorie; Anthony Victor	Phantom	2:57
10.	"Control Me" (featuring Gyakie)	Okorie; Jackline Acheampong	Mix Master Garzy	2:55
11.	"Kolo Kolo" (featuring Diamond Platnumz)	Okorie; Naseeb Juma	Yung Willis; Biggie Jazzy^{[a]}	3:23
12.	"Na Na Na"	Okorie	Killertunes	3:08
13.	"Mama"	Okorie	Phantom	3:22
14.	"Amazing Grace" (featuring Beenie Man)	Okorie; Anthony Davis	Ctea; Biggie Jazzy	3:24
15.	"Lighetrs Up"	Okorie	Ctea; Joshua Moszi	3:09
Total length:				48:50

Notes

- ^{^[a]} signifies an additional producer
- ^{^[b]} signifies a co-producer

== Personnel ==
- Dot Inc - production (1)
- Mix Master Garzy - production (2, 10), vocal engineering (1, 4–15), co-production (6)
- Killertunes - production (3, 12)
- N2theA - production (4)
- DJ Breezy - production (6)
- Kel-P - production (7)
- Phantom - production (8, 9, 13)
- Yung Willis - producer (11)
- Biggie Jazzy - additional production (11), production (14)
- Joshua Moszi - production (15), guitar (6, 14, 15)
- Leandro "Dro" Hidalgo - mixing, mastering (1, 3, 4–15)
- Ctea - vocal engineering (1, 5–14), production (14, 15)
- Jancy Joy Nwankwo - background vocals (1–3, 5, 7, 8, 11, 12, 14, 15)
- Emeka John Azali - background vocals (1–3, 5, 7, 11, 12)
- David Nathaniel Akpan - background vocals (3)
- Abiola Isaac Daramola - background vocals (3–5), guitar (13)
- Brenda Ngozi Adigwe - background vocals (7, 14)
- Cornel's Choir - background vocals (7)
- Lauretta Ayagogo - background vocals (8)
- Luchee Michael - background vocals (8)
- Ogechi Nancy Ihenacho - background vocals (8)
- Favour Jesse Ekwere - background vocals (8)
- Anderson Chima Nwabuwa - background vocals (8)
- Chika Chizoba Daniel - background vocals (11, 12)
- Damilola Ogunleye - guitar (3)
- Daniel Omoyeni - saxophone (4)
- Henrique Carvalhal - guitar (4)
- Richard Ampadu - keyboards (4)
- Oladimeji Sanyaolu - saxophone (8, 11)

== Release history ==
Release history and formats for World Best
Region	Date	Format	Label
Various	6 September 2023	Streaming; digital download	Amari Musiq
