= Wilmer (album) =

Studio album by Patoranking
- Released: 24 May 2019
- Genres: Afrobeats; dancehall; afropop
- Length: 42:24
- Label: Amari Musiq
- Producers: Sarz; Mr. Kamera; Ctea; DJ Coublon; Botcash; Mix Master Garzy

Patoranking chronology
God Over Everything (2016)	Wilmer (2019)	Three (2020)

Singles from Wilmer
- 1. "Confirm" Released: 28 February 2019; 2. "Lenge Lenge" Released: 2 May 2019; 3. "Wilmer" Released: 24 May 2019

Wilmer is the second studio album by Nigerian singer Patoranking. A follow-up to his debut God Over Everything (2016), it was released on 24 May 2019 by Amari Musiq. Named after and dedicated to his daughter, the album features guest appearances from mostly international and pan-African acts, with the only Nigerian act being Davido. Other artists featured on the album include Bera, Dadju, Donae'o, Busiswa, and Nyashinski. Patoranking enlisted production from Sarz, Mr. Kamera, Ctea, DJ Coublon, Botcash, and Mix Master Garzy on the album.

== Background, recording and promotion ==
Work on Wilmer began shortly before the birth of Patoranking's daughter, after whom the album is named. He said that becoming a father in August 2018 changed his perspective and influenced the creative process of the record. According to him, fatherhood provided new inspiration for themes of love and dance that shaped much of the music. The cover and opening track are dedicated to his daughter, with the title track presenting affectionate lyrics directed toward her. Patoranking revealed the track list for the album on 20 May 2019. Patoranking collaborated closely with Georgian singer Bera during the album's creation, after the two met in early 2018. Recording sessions took place across different locations, including his Lagos studio, and featured contributions from his band members, engineers, and management team.

As part of the album's promotion, Patoranking held an exclusive listening party at Kiza Restaurant in Nairobi one week after the album's release. The event featured a teaser performance from Wilmer and was attended by Kenyan artists including Sauti Sol and Nyashinski, alongside other figures from the local music industry. Following the release of Wilmer, Patoranking headlined his first solo concert, titled The Patoranking Experience, on 14 February 2020 at the Transcorp Hilton in Abuja. The concert took place nine months after the album's release and featured guest performances from several Nigerian artists, such as 2Baba, Davido, Tekno, Falz, Teni, and Mayorkun. He brought out his daughter, Wilmer, on stage to perform the album's title track.

== Composition ==
The album incorporates elements of Afrobeat, dancehall, and Afropop. Its songs address a range of subjects, including love, self-actualization, and African unity. "Black" was written as both a critique and a motivational call for solidarity, while "Nakupenda" features Kenyan singer Nyashinski and blends romance with Swahili influences. "Lenge Lenge", inspired by Fela Kuti, was conceived as an Afrobeat tribute to African women. The Davido-assisted "Confirm" reflects on success and ambition.

== Singles ==
The album's Mr. Kamera-produced lead single "Confirm" featuring Davido was released on 28 February 2019. The music video for "Confirm" was directed by Luke Biggins. At the end of the video, Patoranking, accompanied by several women, presents a ₦50 million cheque to an undisclosed children's charity. "Lenge Lenge" was released on 2 May 2019 as the album's second single. It was produced by DJ Coublon. The accompanying music video, directed by Luke Biggins, is a inspired by the 1970s, and features women in 1970s-inspired costumes, including natural afros, traditional hairstyles, face paintings, and beads. Wilmer's title track features French-born Georgian singer Bera and was released as the third single. The music video presents Patoranking spending time with his daughter during her birthday party, alongside other home videos of them spending time together.

== Critical reception ==
Professional ratings
Review scores
Source	Rating
Pulse Nigeria	5.4/10
The Anomaly Diary	8/10
tooXclusive	8.5/10

Taiwo Oluwafemi of tooXclusive rated the album an 8.5/10, concluding that Wilmer "is another way Patoranking has proven his versatility and effortlessness at making really good music", deeming it an improvement to his debut, God Over Everything (2016). A writer for FilterFree that goes by the moniker The Waistbead Whisperer criticized Wilmer for lacking "a unified sound," for "missing a central theme, [and] featured lazy writing" despite some strong tracks and collaborations. They concluded that "Patoranking remained one of Nigeria’s top artistes on any given day despite this experiment going south."

Motolani Alake of Pulse Nigeria said that the album felt "rushed", with certain tracks unnecessarily sticking out too much, although he acknowledged Patoranking's decision to explore diverse sounds and themes. He added that the album could've been more balanced with a track list rearranging, rating the album a 5.4/10. Elvis Mwangi of the Anomaly Diary stated that Wilmer "ticks off most of the right boxes" with strong production, enjoyable beats, and solid performances. He declared the album was "probably the best Nigerian album I have heard this year", rating it an 8/10.

== Track listing ==
Wilmer track listing
No.	Title	Writer(s)	Producer(s)	Length
1.	"Wilmer" (featuring Bera)	Patrick Okorie; Bera Ivanishvili	Mr. Kamera	3:44
2.	"Feelings"	Okorie	DJ Coublon	3:21
3.	"Temperature"	Okorie	DJ Buddha; Shermanology; Menasa	3:08
4.	"Nakupenda" (featuring Nyashinski)	Okorie; Nyamari Ongegu	DJ Coublon	3:24
5.	"Black"	Okorie	Ctea	4:08
6.	"Zéro Problémé" (featuring Dadju)	Okorie; Dadju Nsungula	Mix Master Garzy	3:10
7.	"Lenge Lenge"	Okorie	DJ Coublon	3:41
8.	"Turn Up" (featuring Donae'o)	Okorie; Ian Greenidge	Donae'o; Abayomi Kadejoh	3:08
9.	"Champion"	Okorie	Botcash	3:34
10.	"Go Crazy"	Okorie	Mix Master Garzy	3:25
11.	"Open Fire" (featuring Busiswa)	Okorie; Busiswa Gqulu	Hycinth; Sarz	3:46
12.	"Confirm" (featuring Davido)	Okorie; David Adeleke	Mr. Kamera	3:49
Total length:				42:24

== Personnel ==
Credits adapted from Soundcity.

- Mr. Kamera – production (tracks 1 and 12)
- DJ Coublon – production (tracks 2, 4 and 7)
- Ctea – production (track 5)
- Mix Master Garzy – production (tracks 6 and 10)
- Donae'o and Abayomi Kadejoh – production (track 8)
- Botcash – production (track 9)
- Hycinth and Sarz – production (track 11)
- DJ Buddha, Shermanology, and Menasa – production (track 13)

== Release history ==
Release history and formats for Wilmer
Region	Date	Format	Label
Various	28 May 2019	Streaming; digital download	Amari Musiq
