= My Lady (disambiguation) =

My Lady is a civil term of respect for a woman.

My Lady may also refer to:

- "My Lady" (Exo song), a song from the 2013 album XOXO
- "My Lady" (Jay Ghartey song), a 2009 single
- My Lady, a 1979 album and title song by Freddie Hart
- "My Lady", the B side of "My Sentimental Friend", a 1969 song by Herman's Hermits
- "My Lady", a 1967 single by Jet Harris

== See also ==
- Lady (disambiguation)
