= Ghartey =

Ghartey may refer to:

- Jay Ghartey, Ghanaian-American music producer, singer, and songwriter
- Joe Ghartey, Ghanaian lawyer and politician
