= Flexclusive =

Ghanaian singer & rapper (born 1986)

- Born: Felix Owusu Ankrah; 1986 (age 39–40); Kumasi, Ghana
- Origin: Kumasi, Ghana
- Genres: Afropop, hiplife, RnB
- Occupations: Rapper, singer, producer
- Years active: 2011–present
- Label: Flexclusive Music Entertainment
- Website: www.flexclusivemusic.com

Flexclusive is the stage name of Felix Owusu Ankrah, a Ghanaian born the Netherlands based singer, rapper, producer and is CEO of Flexclusive Music Entertainment.

== Early life and education ==
Ankrah was born in Kumasi Ghana but moved to Europe to settle with his parents in Amsterdam at an early age, and began making music in his early school days. He had his elementary education at Kings International School in Kumasi, Ghana and then attended ROC Flevoland in the Netherlands before earning himself a bachelor's degree in International Music Management from Inholland University of Applied Sciences.

== Recognition and musical style ==
Flexclusive caught the public's eye when he released the remix version of his single "Anything For You" featuring "Itz Tiffany", which enjoyed massive airplay Ghana, the Netherlands, Belgium, UK, Canada and the US. In 2013 Flexclusive was nominated and won the best song of the year with the hit single "The One" at the African Diaspora Awards which was held in Amsterdam, Netherlands. In 2014 he was nominated for the African Diaspora Awards for the best song of the year and the best collaboration of the year.

In 2015, he released the video single “Woman”, featuring Dr Cryme and produced by Mix Masta Garzy.

In 2021, Flexclusive released the album Vibe With Me, which included singles such as “My Love” featuring Eno Barony, “Wo'a Sisa” featuring Fameye and “Buss My Brain”. The same year he released the video single “Mona Lisa”, featuring Bisa Kdei. In 2026, he released the single “I Know”, produced by Mix Masta Garzy.

Over the years he has collaborated with several Ghanaian musicians including Dr Cryme, Bisa Kdei, Eno Barony, Captain Planet, Fameye, KK Fosu, Ayesem and Mugeez of R2Bees.

== Awards and nominations ==
=== African Diaspora Awards ===
- "Best Song Of The Year 2013" - Won
- "Best Video of the year 2013" - Nominee
- "Best artist Of The Year 2013" - Nominee
- "Best song of the Year 2014" - Nominee
- "Best collaboration of the year 2014" - Nominee

== Discography ==
- Long Way Album (2011)
- Vibe With Me (2021)

=== Singles ===
- Woman featuring Dr Cryme Produced by MixMasta Garzy
- The One (2013)
- Odo Ye De featuring Captain Planet (2014)
- All I Need featuring Mugeez (2015)
- Hold You (2016)
- Sobolo featuring KK Fosu (2017)
- Confusion (2017)
- No Delay featuring Proper (2017)
- Hyia Me featuring Ayesem (2018)
- Give Thanks (2020)
- Mona Lisa featuring Bisa Kdei (2021)
- Wo'a Sisa featuring Fameye (2021)
- My Love featuring Eno Barony (2021)
- Buss My Brain (2021)
- Dem Dey Jealous featuring Eno Barony (2023)
- I Know (2026)
