= Three (Patoranking album) =

Studio album by Patoranking
- Released: 28 August 2020
- Studio: Wilmer Studios, Lekki
- Genre: Afrobeats; reggae; highlife; Afro pop
- Length: 41:15
- Label: Amari Musiq
- Producer: DJ Coublon; KillaShay; Mr. Kamera; Culan; Telz; Ctea; Jaydot; Dëra; Hysaint

Patoranking chronology
Wilmer (2019)	Three (2020)	World Best (2023)

Singles from Three
- 1. "Abule" Released: 30 July 2020

Three is the third studio album by Nigerian singer Patoranking. It was released on 28 August 2020 by Amari Musiq, and features guest appearances from Tiwa Savage, Flavour, Sauti Sol and King Promise. The album housed production from DJ Coublon, KillaShay, Mr. Kamera, Culan, Telz, Ctea, Jaydot, Dëra and Hysaint. The album serves as a follow-up to Wilmer (2019), and has been described as "his best album yet" by critics.

== Background ==
Patoranking recorded Three during the COVID-19 lockdown, with the aim of creating music that could uplift listeners during difficult times. Reflecting on the album's inspiration, he said, "We can't just keep complaining about death... Let's get something to cheer the people up, give them some hope... and the only way I can do that is through my music." He emphasized that the album's themes of love, happiness, and life were meant to resonate with listeners and provide a sense of optimism amidst the global crisis.

He was heavily influenced by the pandemic while creating Three, shaping the album's themes around "love, happiness, and life" as a way to counterbalance the negativity surrounding the crisis. He explained that he wanted to move away from the more reflective tone of his previous works and create music that would help listeners have fun and stay hopeful during difficult times. While much of the album is lighthearted, it also tackles important social issues on tracks like "Black Girl Magic," "Lion in the Jungle," and "Love is the Answer," maintaining a balance between feel-good music and deeper, conscious messaging. For Patoranking, Three represents his desire to promote love and break down societal barriers through his art. themes of love, happiness, and life were meant to resonate with listeners and provide a sense of optimism amidst the global crisis.

== Singles ==
The album's only single "Abule" was released on 30 July 2020. It was produced by Telz. The dancehall, highlife and Afropop song talks about his life in his hometown, hence the name "Abule," meaning "village" or "hood." Patoranking described the song as "a celebration of his Lagos neighborhood, Ebute Metta, and of hoods worldwide."

== Critical reception ==
Motolani Alake of Pulse Nigeria rated the album a 7/10, calling it "potentially Patoranking's best album yet" for its cohesion and diverse Afro-pop sound, but noting it "lacks shock value." Olamilekan Remilekun of tooXclusive reviewed Three as a solid album that showcases his growth, versatility, and mastery of his sound, with Afro-pop, dancehall, and reggae elements shining through. Despite its lyrical shortcomings and lack of cohesion, the album’s production, standout tracks like Abule and Matter (featuring Tiwa Savage), and Patoranking’s ability to experiment with genres mark it as a milestone in his career. As the reviewer concluded, “Three is a better Patoranking album but not a hot strike.” Dami Ajayi of The Lagos Review praised Three by Patoranking as his best album yet, highlighting its nostalgic mood and Ajegunle raga influences that have matured in his sound. Ajayi commended the top-notch production and standout tracks like "Abule," calling it "one of his biggest accomplishments in years," but noted that the jury is still out on Patoranking's true mastery.

=== Accolades ===
Awards and nominations for Three
Organization	Year	Category	Result	Ref.
The Headies 2022	2022	Best Reggae/Dancehall Album	Won	

== Track listing ==
Three track listing
No.	Title	Writer(s)	Producer(s)	Length
1.	"Mon Bébé" (featuring Flavour)	Patrick Okorie; Chinedu Okoli	Telz	3:25
2.	"Yo Body"	Okorie	Ctea	3:09
3.	"Whine It" (featuring Sauti Sol)	Okorie; Delvin Mudigi; Bienaime Baraza; Polycarp Otieno; Willis Chimano	Dëra; Jaydot	3:37
4.	"Nobody"	Okorie	Ctea	3:33
5.	"Black Girl Magic"	Okorie	DJ Coublon; Mr. Kamera	3:21
6.	"Abule"	Okorie	Telz	3:19
7.	"Matter" (featuring Tiwa Savage)	Okorie; Tiwatope Savage	Mr. Kamera	3:19
8.	"Brrr"	Okorie	Culan	3:34
9.	"Do Me"	Okorie	Telz	3:19
10.	"Odo Bra" (featuring King Promise)	Okorie; Gregory Newman	Hysaint	3:33
11.	"Lion in the Jungle"	Okorie	KillaShay	3:32
12.	"Love is the Answer"	Okorie	Mr. Kamera	3:27
Total length:				41:15

== Personnel ==
- Patrick Nnaemaka Okorie – main artist, writer
- Tiwatope Omolara Savage – featured artist, writer
- Chinedu Izuchukwu Okoli – featured artist, writer
- Gregory Bortey Newman – featured artist, writer
- Bien-Aimé Ausa Baraza, Willis Austin Chimano, Savara Mudigi & Polycarp Otieno - featured artists, writers
- Alli Odunayo - producer
- Akwuba Charles Ugochukwu - producer
- Jonathan Takyi Mensah - producer
- Shalom Ogheneochuko - producer
- Tatenda Terence Kamera - producer
- Jhaye Chayenne McKie - producer
- Ezeani Chidera Godfrey - producer
- Luke Grayson - producer
- Malcom Tariq Smith - mixing engineer, mastering engineer
- Benjamin Garzy Mensah - mixing engineer, executive producer
