= Prince Kuleape Boamah =

Ghanaian Fashion Designer and Wardrobe Stylist

Prince Kuleape Boamah (known professionally as Kulaperry) is a Ghanaian fashion designer and wardrobe stylist. He is noted as the creator of the "Kulaperryoutlook" and the "FearNoMan" clothing lines.

== Career ==
As a stylist, Boamah has worked with musicians in Ghana to prepare their wardrobes for their music videos. Most notably, he worked with Sarkodie to style his wardrobe for the music video of his Single Whine Fi Mi. He also styled the wardrobe for Dr Cryme and Sarkodie's "Koko Sakora". The video went on to win Best Hiplife Music Video at the Mtn 4SYTE Music Video Awards in 2016. He has styled Ghanaian rapper and radio presenter Joel Orleans for the video to his single “Give Me Room” and DJ Kess for the 2015 Vodafone Ghana Music Awards. In 2018, Efya collaborated with singer Kulaperry to create and release her own merchandise.

== Recognition ==
As recognition for his work, Boamah won the 'Overall Entrepreneur of the Year' at the Young Achievers Summit Awards 2018. His clothing line "Fear No Man Clothing" collection was also recognized as the “Emerging Brand of the year 2018” at the African Youth Choice Awards.
