= God Over Everything =

Studio album by Patoranking
- Released: 1 August 2016
- Recorded: 2012–16
- Genres: Afrobeat; reggae; afropop; soul; dancehall; highlife
- Length: 60:39
- Label: Foston Muzik
- Producers: E Kelly; Sarz; GospelOnDeBeatz; Major Bangz; Dr. Amir; Ball Jay; WizzyPro; Jazzwad; Slick Mo; UC Prof; Dapiano

Patoranking chronology
God Over Everything (2016)	Wilmer (2019)

Singles from God Over Everything
- 1. "No Kissing Baby" Released: 26 June 2016

God Over Everything (abbreviated as G.O.E) is the debut studio album by Nigerian singer Patoranking. It was released on 1 August 2016. The album features guest appearances from Wizkid, Olamide, Phyno, Elephant Man, Kwam 1 and Konshens. Production was handled by E Kelly, Sarz, GospelOnDeBeatz, Major Bangz, Dr. Amir, Ball Jay, WizzyPro, Jazzwad, Slick Mo, UC Prof, and Dapiano. The album received a nomination for Album of the Year at the 2017 Ghana-Naija Showbiz Awards and peaked at #4 on the Billboard Reggae Albums chart.

== Background ==
Patoranking released G.O.E three years after the release of his breakthrough single "Alubarika". He revealed that the album's release was delayed due to his uncertainty about his reach across Nigeria. While an album was ready after the success of "Girlie O", Patoranking wanted to release singles to "get closer to the people" first. The recording process for G.O.E spanned over three years, with the "Stammerer" being recorded four years prior to the album's release. Patoranking worked with various producers and collaborators to ensure the album reflected diverse musical styles and appealed to a wide demographic.

== Singles ==
G.O.E's only single "No Kissing Baby" featuring Ghanaian rapper Sarkodie was released on 26 June 2016. It was produced by GospelOnDeBeatz, and its music video directed by Daps, premiered shortly after the single's announcement and features a 90s-inspired aesthetic, including graffiti-covered walls, dancehall choreography, and retro fashion elements. The video was set in a playground and includes scenes of Patoranking and Sarkodie performing with backup dancers.

== Critical reception ==
Professional ratings
Review scores
Source	Rating
tooXclusive	3.5/5 stars
Pulse Nigeria	3.5/5 stars
Jaguda	3.5/5 stars

God Over Everything received generally positive reviews from music critics. Joey Akan, reviewing for Pulse Nigeria, praised Patoranking for "recreat[ing] Ajegunle, Konto, and dancehall music" and "polishing and modernizing" them. Despite "a monotony of themes" and some tracks feeling "rushed"; he concluded that the singer’s releases are "desirably niche" and rated the album 3.5 out of 5. Chuks Kings of tooXclusive commended Patoranking for how he "messed around different genres and merged them with his style" rather than making "typical Nigerian secular noisy songs", and awarded the album a rating of 3.5 out of 5 stars.

In a review for The NET, Toni Kan called G.O.E an "experimental album" and "a mop of influences" that "gets high marks for standing up to scrutiny" and showed Patoranking was "serious about this business and will be here for a while longer". Jaguda's Ayo Jaguda called G.O.E "a good debut" that "will be celebrated for years to come". Noting it "definitely could’ve been a lot better", he awarded it 3 out of 5 stars. Oris Aigbokhaevbolo, reviewing for Music in Africa, characterized G.O.E as a "parlour-ready and family friendly package" that shifted "the focus of the Nigerian album away from the club"; he concluded, "It is no classic but… it is at least subversive". Chiagoziem Onyekwena, writing for FilterFree Nigeria, described G.O.E as a "solid but unfulfilling and contradictory LP", criticizing its "mixed messaging" and "lack of lyrical depth" while noting that Patoranking "ran out of steam and, perhaps more disappointingly, ran out of ideas" on his "oft-delayed debut album".

=== Accolades ===
Awards and nominations for God Over Everything
Organization	Year	Category	Result	Ref.
Ghana-Naija Showbiz Awards	2017	Album of the Year	Nominated	

== Track listing ==
G.O.E track listing
No.	Title	Writer(s)	Producer(s)	Length
1.	"Patoranking"	Patrick Okorie	Ball Jay	3:33
2.	"G.O.E"	Okorie	WizzyPro	3:52
3.	"Cheating Zone"	Okorie	Jazzwad	3:56
4.	"Money" (featuring Phyno)	Okorie; Chibuzo Azubuike	WizzyPro	3:44
5.	"Killing Me"	Okorie	E Kelly	3:14
6.	"This Kind Luv" (featuring Wizkid)	Okorie; Ayodeji Balogun	Sarz	3:49
7.	"Writing on the Wall"	Okorie	GospelOnDeBeatz	3:52
8.	"Forever"	Okorie	WizzyPro	4:21
9.	"No Kissing Baby" (featuring Sarkodie)	Okorie; Michael Addo	GospelOnDeBeatz	3:41
10.	"Mama Aboyo" (featuring Olamide)	Okorie; Olamide Adedeji	Major Bangz	3:38
11.	"Stammerer"	Okorie	WizzyPro	4:25
12.	"Love Town"	Okorie; Harrison Okiri	Dr. Amir	3:22
13.	"Halé Halé"	Okorie	E Kelly	3:28
14.	"Daniella Whine" (remix; featuring Elephant Man and Konshens)	Okorie; O'Neil Bryan; Garfield Spence	Slick Mo; UC Prof	3:55
15.	"Beautiful"	Okorie	Dapiano	3:46
16.	"Ayinde" (featuring Kwam 1)	Okorie; Wasiu Ayinde Marshal	Major Bangz	4:03
Total length:				60:39

Physical version bonus tracks
No.	Title	Writer(s)	Producer(s)	Length
17.	"My Woman, My Everything" (featuring Wande Coal)	Okorie; Oluwatobi Ojosipe	DJ Breezy	3:55
18.	"Girlie 'O' (Remix)" (featuring Tiwa Savage)	Okorie; Tiwatope Savage	WizzyPro	3:57
19.	"Make Am"	Okorie	Jay Pizzle	3:54
20.	"Alubarika" (featuring Timaya)	Okorie; Inetimi Odon	WizzyPro	3:55

== Personnel ==
Credits adapted from back cover.

- Ball Jay - production (track 1)
- WizzyPro - production (tracks 2, 4, 8, 11)
- Jazzwad - production (track 3)
- E Kelly - production (tracks 5, 13)
- Sarz - production (track 6)
- GospelOnDeBeatz - production (tracks 7, 9)
- Major Bangz - production (tracks 10, 16)
- Dr. Amir - production (track 12)
- Slick Mo & UC Prof - production (track 14)
- Dapiano - production (track 15)
- Jazzworx - mixing, mastering (all tracks)

== Charts ==
=== Weekly charts ===
Chart performance for God Over Everything
Chart (2016)	Peak position
US Reggae Albums (Billboard)	4

== Release history ==
Release history and formats for God Over Everything
Region	Date	Format	Label
Various	1 August 2016	CD; digital download	Foston Muzik
