= Bidzina Ivanishvili =

Georgian billionaire and politician (born 1956)

- ბიძინა ივანიშვილი
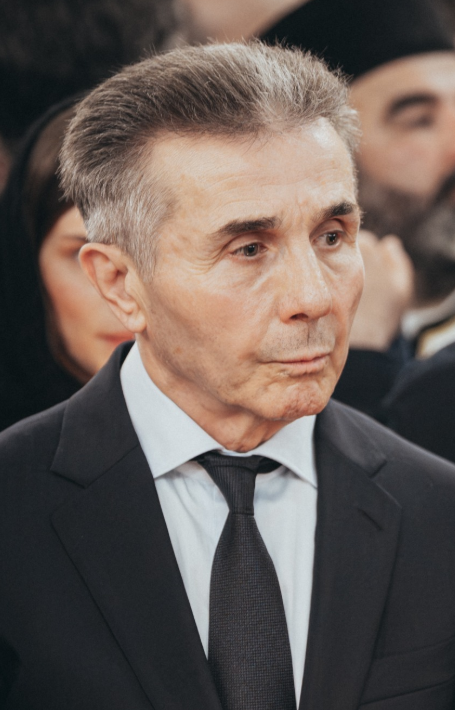
- Ivanishvili in 2026

Prime Minister of Georgia
- In office 25 October 2012 – 20 November 2013
- President: Mikheil Saakashvili; Giorgi Margvelashvili
- Preceded by: Vano Merabishvili
- Succeeded by: Irakli Garibashvili

Member of the Parliament of Georgia
- In office 25 November 2024 – 10 December 2024

Chairman of Georgian Dream
- In office 12 April 2012 – 15 November 2013
- Preceded by: Position established
- Succeeded by: Irakli Garibashvili
- In office 26 April 2018 – 11 January 2021
- Preceded by: Giorgi Kvirikashvili
- Succeeded by: Irakli Kobakhidze

Honorary Chairman of Georgian Dream
- Incumbent
- Assumed office 30 December 2023
- Preceded by: Position established

Personal details
- Born: 18 February 1956 (age 70) Chorvila, Georgian SSR, Soviet Union
- Citizenship: Georgia (2004–2011, 2012–present); France (2004–present); Russia (1991–2011); Soviet Union (until 1991)
- Party: Georgian Dream (2012–2013, 2018–2021, 2023–present)
- Spouse: Ekaterine Khvedelidze (m. 1991)
- Children: 4, including Bera
- Education: Tbilisi State University; Moscow State University of Railway Engineering
- Awards: Legion of Honour
- Net worth: US$7.27 billion (2024)

Bidzina Ivanishvili (Georgian: ბიძინა ივანიშვილი; born 18 February 1956), also known as Boris Grigoryevich Ivanishvili, (Note: Russian: Борис Григо́рьевич Иванишви́ли) is a Georgian businessman, politician and oligarch. In 2012 he founded the Georgian Dream party and led it to the victory in the 2012 Georgian parliamentary election. After briefly serving as the country's prime minister in 2012–2013, Ivanishvili has been the de facto leader of Georgia since then through his informal influence. Since December 2023, he has held a post of the honorary chairman of the ruling Georgian Dream party, a position created specifically for him, granting him a right to nominate the prime ministerial candidate, unlikely to be rejected given Ivanishvili's status as the party's patron.

Ivanishvili is the richest man in Georgia, with his wealth estimated at $7.6 billion in 2024, a figure equivalent to 24.8% of Georgia's 2023 GDP. Ivanishvili made his wealth in Russia in the 1990s following the collapse of the Soviet Union. He initially sold computers in Russia before acquiring cheap banking and metals assets when the Russian government privatized its Soviet-era state assets under Mikhail Gorbachev, and subsequently Boris Yeltsin. Ivanishvili left Russia in 2002 and moved to France, becoming a French citizen.

Ivanishvili entered Georgian politics in 2012, when he founded the Georgian Dream-Democratic Georgia party and secured victory in the 2012 Georgian parliamentary election against the United National Movement party of incumbent President Mikheil Saakashvili. After serving as Prime Minister of Georgia from October 2012 to November 2013, he claimed that he was leaving political life; however, he continued to be widely viewed as the éminence grise controlling the Georgian political process from behind the scenes. After formally returning to politics in 2018 as chairman of the ruling party, Ivanishvili again claimed to be leaving politics behind in 2021, only to stage yet another comeback in late 2023 as the honorary chairman of Georgian Dream. Since 2024, he has been sanctioned by the United States and several European Union countries "for undermining Georgian democracy and advancing the interests of the Russian Federation".

== Early life and education ==
Bidzina Ivanishvili was born in Chorvila, a village in the Imereti region of Georgia. He was the youngest of five children in a poor family. His father, Grigor Ivanishvili, worked in a manganese factory. As a child, Bidzina was raised in extreme poverty (for example, not having access to shoes). His poor background would later endear him to rural Georgians and help to bring him victory in the 2012 Georgian parliamentary election.

Bidzina graduated from high school in Sachkhere. He also graduated from the Faculty of Engineering and Economics of the Tbilisi State University in 1980, and in 1982, went to Moscow to pursue a PhD in economics at the Moscow State University of Railway Engineering.

== Business career ==
In 1988, Ivanishvili turned to business. He founded a cooperative — the only private company allowed in the Soviet Union of the 1980s. Prior to 1990, while living in Moscow, Ivanishvili met Vitaly Malkin, a Russian businessman currently into politics, with whom he formed a partnership selling computers, and later importing what was then a novelty in Russia, push-button telephones. The fortune they made from this trade allowed them to cheaply purchase lucrative metals and banking assets when the Russian government privatized its Soviet-era state assets. Metals and banking are source of Ivanishvili's great wealth.

== Early political career ==
In 1996, Ivanishvili became part of Semibankirschina, a group of influential Russian bankers who supported the re-election of Boris Yeltsin as Russian president during the 1996 Russian presidential election. Ivanishvili sponsored the presidential campaign of Alexander Lebed in an attempt to pull votes from the Communist candidate Gennady Zyuganov, who was Yeltsin's main opponent. Ivanishvili was later criticized by his political opponents in Georgia for his support of Lebed, who was one of the leading Soviet military figures in the April 9 tragedy. Ivanishvili maintained that he was a supporter of Boris Yeltsin who opposed the Communist candidate. Therefore, he was indirectly supporting the independence of Georgia by opposing the return of Communists to power and restoration of the USSR.

Ivanishvili left Russia in 2002 and moved to France. In 2003, he returned to Georgia. Upon his return, he began giving out goods such as DVD players and stoves, as well as promising free healthcare for his town's residents. However, at the same time, he remained elusive, preferring to remain out of the attention of the press. Ivanishvili had provided the funds to build Tbilisi's Sameba Cathedral, the largest church in Georgia, the fact that was unknown to the general public until former President of Georgia Eduard Shevardnadze named Ivanishvili in his memoirs.

According to Raphaël Glucksmann, Mikheil Saakashvili's French adviser, Ivanishvili supported the Rose Revolution and financed the reforms enacted by the government afterwards. Ivanishvili donated US$1 billion to support the government of Georgia after the Rose Revolution. He provided funds to reform the police and build a new infrastructure in the country. It is speculated that his support for the government after the Rose Revolution may have stemmed from his conflict with another Georgian oligarch Badri Patarkatsishvili who was in opposition to Mikheil Saakashvili. At that time, Ivanishvili was allegedly close to Georgian Interior Minister Vano Merabishvili, while Saakashvili allegedly remained more sceptical of him. However, according to Ivanishvili, he often met Saakashvili as well.

Ivanishvili allegedly fell out with Saakashvili at the beginning of 2008. It is speculated that with the death of Patarkatsishvili, Ivanishvili was no longer reliant on the support from the state, which allowed him to break ranks with the government. Ivanishvili himself stated that he came under increasing pressure from the Saakashvili government and was no longer interested in providing funds for the government projects.

== 2012 parliamentary election ==
Prior to entering politics, Ivanishvili was asked by the opposition leaders to lead the opposition a number of times. For example, in January 2008, the Labor Party leader Shalva Natelashvili said that in case of winning the presidential election, he would offer the office of prime minister to Ivanishvili, without clarifying whether he had Ivanishvili's approval for such move. This statement of Natelashvili came in sharp contrast with his accusation in September 2006 that Ivanishvili was financing Saakashvili.

On 7 October 2011, Ivanishvili announced his intention to lead the opposition in the 2012 Georgian parliamentary election in a written statement, citing the perceived authoritarianism of President of Georgia Mikheil Saakashvili. In the same statement, he stated he would renounce his French and Russian citizenship, as well as sell off all of his assets in Russia. His bank Rossiysky Kredit was sold for 352 million dollars, to a group of investors comprising major Russian bankers. His drugstore chain Doktor Stoletov was sold for 60 million dollars to the Imperia-Pharma company. His agriculture company Stoilenskiy Niva was also sold.

Four days after declaring his intentions, Ivanishvili was stripped of his citizenship by Georgian authorities, citing article 32 of the Georgian Law on Citizenship. The civil registry agency ruled his citizenship had become invalid since he acquired a French passport in 2004. On 27 December 2011, a Tbilisi court upheld the revocation of Ivanishvili's citizenship, but overturned the revocation of his wife's citizenship. Subsequently, she announced her intentions to run for a seat in the Parliament of Georgia.

On 21 February 2012, Ivanishvili announced a coalition by the name of Georgian Dream, composed of his planned political party of the same name, the Republican Party of Georgia, Our Georgia – Free Democrats, and the National Forum.

Georgian Dream's 12-point manifesto included among other policies, the development of liberal democracy, deepening integration with the European Union and NATO, and improvement of education and healthcare infrastructure. Following the announcement, the Industry Will Save Georgia party joined the coalition on 11 April 2012.

On 21 April 2012, Ivanishvili formally established the Georgian Dream political party. Since Ivanishvili was not a Georgian citizen at the moment of the party's inaugural session, the lawyer Manana Kobakhidze was elected as an interim, nominal chairman of the Georgian Dream – Democratic Georgia. The main goals of Georgian Dream were stated to be a revival of agriculture, lowering taxes on the poor, universal health insurance, normalization of relations with Russia and strengthening Georgia's ties to the EU and NATO.

Ivanishvili united much of the Georgian opposition around him. The Georgian Dream coalition included parties of diverse ideological orientations. The coalition was made up of parties ranging from pro-market and pro-western liberals to nationalists and protectionists, united in their dislike of Saakashvili and the United National Movement. The name of the alliance was inspired by a rap song by Ivanishvili's son Bera.

Ivanishvili's personal wealth amounted to 6.4 billion dollars, according to Forbes, which was more than the Georgian State budget (5.7 billion dollars). During the pre-election campaign, Ivanishvili was giving out gifts, televisions, dishwashers and washing machines to the residents of his hometown. The Georgian Dream volunteers handed out fliers where people could write down a "Georgian dream" that cost less than GEL1,000 ($600) – implying that a vote for the opposition would be materially rewarded. In June 2012, the administrative court fined Ivanishvili US$90 million for breaking political party funding regulations. The court of appeals upheld the decision of the lower court on the merits, but halved the fine imposed to US$45 million. The court ruled that Ivanishvili used offshore companies linked to him to by-pass the law, illegally donating to the Georgian Dream coalition. LTD Burji and Elita Burji offered preferential prices on car renting and office renovation to the Georgian Dream coalition. Their official representative in Georgia, Kakha Kobiashvili, was a nephew of Bidzina Ivanishvili. The State Audit Service said that this constituted an illegal donation Ivanishvili had made through his companies in violation of the party funding rules and requested the court to fine him. In another case, The Global TV, owned by Ivanishvili's brother, has distributed and installed satellite dishes for free in provinces. The representative of the state audit agency at the court hearing alleged that Global TV launched this campaign only after it received a loan from Cartu Bank, which was presumably owned by Ivanishvili's Cartu Group. In August 2012, Ivanishvili was fined US$12.3 million for irregular party donations on account of being unable to demonstrate that a cash withdrawal of around US$3 million from his private bank account had not been spent furthering the electoral aims of the "Georgian Dream". The court decisions were criticized as poorly evidenced. Ivanishvili was not provided with adequate time or sufficient equality of arms to contest effectively. The Court rejected the defence's applications to call and cross examine the witnesses whose testimony was relied on to establish ownership of Cartu Bank. Ivanishvili was also denied the opportunity to cross-examine State Audit Organization witnesses. Ivanishvili's lawyer criticized the decisions as politically motivated.

The Georgian Dream coalition successfully challenged the ruling United National Movement (UNM) in the 2012 parliamentary election. Georgian Dream won the election with 54.97% of the vote. Widespread celebrations in the Georgian capital of Tbilisi were held in support of Georgian Dream. The next day, Saakashvili accepted the results as legitimate, while at the same time noting that he remained deeply opposed to the coalition.

== Prime Minister of Georgia (2012–2013) ==
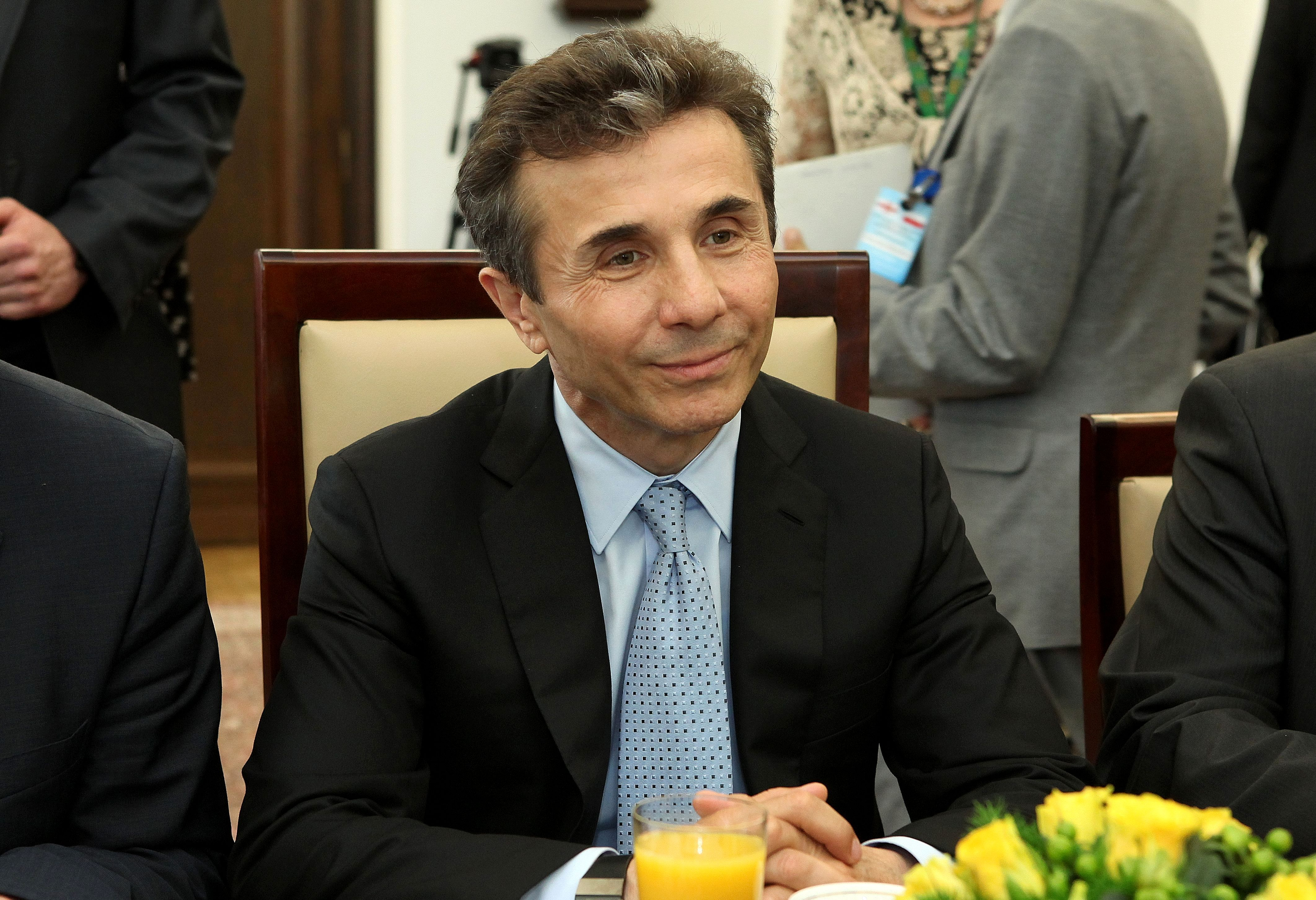
Ivanishvili in the Polish Senate, 2013

On 25 October 2012, Ivanishvili officially took office as Prime Minister of Georgia, marking the first peaceful transition of power to occur in modern Georgia's history.

During this period, the government increased social spending, while continuing on the path of fiscal consolidation.

In February 2013, the government introduced the Universal Healthcare Program (UHP). The package covered urgent outpatient assistance, urgent hospital assistance, scheduled outpatient and policlinic services. In July, it was expanded to cover primary health care services, urgent outpatient assistance, extended urgent hospitalization, planned surgeries, treatment of oncological diseases, and child delivery. The reform made state-sponsored health insurance available on a massive scale.

Besides, the government also increased pensions, social assistance allowances and education spending.

In June 2013, the parliament adopted a new Labour Code in line with International Labour Organization (ILO) standards.

According to the Georgian Institute of Politics, under Ivanishvili's leadership, Georgia retained most of the reforms passed during Saakashvili's presidency. Georgia maintained the free market economic model created during Saakashvili's tenure, while also establishing a functional social safety net.

The government implemented prison reform. During the previous administration, which pursued a zero-tolerance policy, the prisoner numbers had increased four-fold from over 6,000 in 2003 to 24,000 in 2012. The prisons were overcrowded and prisoners were subject to systematic torture. In September, 2012, mass protests erupted in Georgia following the broadcast of video footage showing abuse and torture of prisoners in Gldani prison in Tbilisi. The new government conceded fundamental problems in the prisons system and promised to carry out a reform. The parliament adopted an amnesty law, which halved the prison population. The mortality rate in prisons considerably went down and prison healthcare was overhauled. The government liberalized criminal policies. The practice of cumulative sentencing ended in April 2013.

The government faced a challenge of tackling legacy of abuse committed by the former government officials. More than 20 000 complaints were filed by citizens and inmates with the Prosecutor's Office in connection to injustices of past administration, including 4 000 cases of alleged torture or ill-treatment. Thirty-five officials who had served under the previous government were charged with criminal offences with accusations ranging from embezzlement to abuse of power and torture. Former Prime Minister Vano Merabishvili, governor of Kakheti Zurab Tchiaberashvili and Head of Penitentiary Department Bacho Akhalaia were among the ones who were arrested. Bringing former government officials to justice for the human rights violations was one of the main pre-election promises of Georgian Dream, especially after the Gldani prison scandal confirmed long-standing allegations of ill-treatment in the Georgian prison system.

The day before the 2013 anti-homophobia rally in Tbilisi, Ivanishvili has stated that "sexual minorities are the same citizens as we are... [and that] the society will gradually get used to it."

In 2013, the Georgian Orthodox Church unsuccessfully lobbied the Georgian government to ban abortions, which it described as a "terrible sin" and "heinous murder", while blaming it for the "grave demographic situation" in the country. Bidzina Ivanishvili brushed off the proposal, stating that solving demographic problems "first and foremost needs economic development".

Despite predictions and allegations of then ruling United National Movement, Ivanishvili's election did not see return of Shevardnadze-era levels of corruption and crime. Ivanishvili's Georgia scored well on Transparency International's Corruption Perception Index and Index and Freedom House's Freedom in the World index.

=== Foreign relations ===
Under the Ivanishvili government, Georgia deepened its ties with the European Union. Prime Minister Bidzina Ivanishvili chose Brussels for his first foreign visit in November 2012. The EU launched a visa dialogue with Georgia in 2012 and formally handed over a Visa Liberalisation Action Plan (VLAP) to it in February 2013. The first progress report on the implementation of the VLAP was published on 15 November 2013 which concluded that Georgia had made very good progress. In July 2013, the EU and Georgia concluded the negotiations on a Deep and Comprehensive Free Trade Area (DCFTA).

In January 2013, Georgia and Turkey signed a cross-border agreement on electricity trade across new interconnections between them.

The relations with Russia improved. In December 2012, Russian and Georgian representatives met in Prague and had the first two-way discussions after the 2008 war. Prime Minister Ivanishvili appointed special envoy for relations with Russia, Zurab Abashidze. In June 2013, Russia lifted the embargo on Georgian wine. This allowed Georgia to resume wine exports to Russia for the first time since 2006. Economic relations between Georgia and Russia improved. However, Tamar Beruchachvili, the Deputy State Minister for European and Euro-Atlantic Integration of Georgia, reaffirmed that European integration remained Georgia's "strategic priority" and that Georgia had no plans to join the Eurasian Economic Union. Diplomatic relations with Russia remained formally broken.

Ivanishvili termed his foreign policy with Russia "pragmatic". Despite his commitment to uphold a "principled" position towards Russia despite a stated goal of "de-escalating" tensions, Ivanishvili received criticism from the former governing United National Movement for being "too lenient" towards Russia and even allegedly being "pro-Russian". The UNM portrayed Ivanishvili as a "Kremlin agent" who sought to turn Georgia subservient toward Russia. Ivanishvili said that he would continue to uphold Georgia's national interests in relation to Russia, but would abandon "a confrontational manner of interaction".

== First resignation (2013–2018) ==
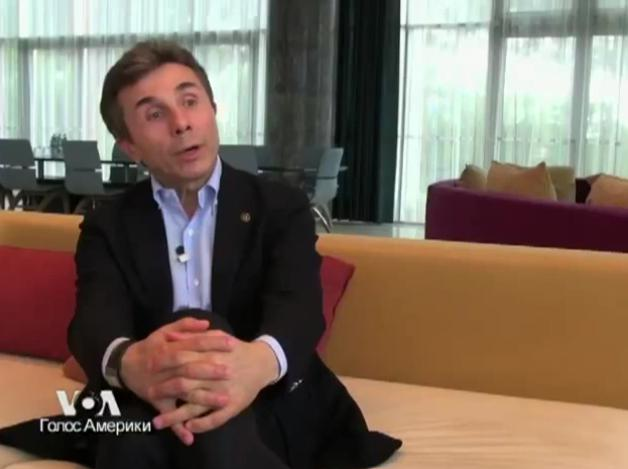
Ivanishvili in an interview with Voice of America, 2013

Following a victory by Georgian Dream candidate Giorgi Margvelashvili in the 2013 Georgian presidential election, Ivanishvili announced his intention to resign as Prime Minister. 20 November 2013, Ivanishvili resigned as Prime Minister after just over a year in office. He was succeeded by Interior Minister Irakli Garibashvili, whom he had announced as his successor on 2 November 2013. Ivanishvili stated that his intention was to return to civil sector and form a non-government organisation. Four days after his resignation as Prime Minister, he resigned as Chairman of Georgian Dream.

His successor Irakli Garibashvili has thanked Ivanishvili for creating "unique precedent" by leaving all political positions "at the zenith of popularity and influence". However, Ivanishvili still continued to be regarded by his political opponents as the de facto leader of Georgia. They accused Ivanishvili of leaving his official post to govern the country behind the scenes, while avoiding the responsibilities and duties of holding office. Out of four prime ministers who headed the government of Georgia after Ivanishvili, three of them had previously been managers in his companies. Many officials who served on high-ranking positions since 2013 were connected to Ivanishvili: the Minister of Internal Affairs (who previously served as head of State Security Agency) Vakhtang Gomelauri and the Head of Special State Protection Service Anzor Chubinidze were his former personal bodyguards. The Prosecutor General Shalva Tadumadze was his family lawyer. The Ministers of Health Ekaterine Tikaradze and Davit Sergeenko previously managed the hospital which Ivanishvili has been funding in his home municipality.

A study published by Transparency International Georgia in 2015 revealed based on public officials' asset declarations that at least 38 officials used to work for companies associated with Bidzina Ivanishvili. While not a violation of the law, it is cited as an evidence of Ivanishvili's alleged informal influence on the government. it is speculated that Ivanishvili's company employees were appointed on high-ranking positions because of their loyalty to Ivanishvili.

Ivanishvili himself denied any accusations of informal rule, saying that he takes no part in decision-making except giving advice, which might or might not be taken into account.

After his resignation as prime minister, Ivanishvili has further pursued his interest in collection of rare trees. In 2016, he began building the Dendrological Park in Shekvetili (Georgia's Black Sea coast), which was opened to the public in 2020. The 60-hectare arboretum contains 200 species of imported trees and 58 exotic bird species, including flamingos and pelicans. Many of the trees at the park have been collected from places around the Georgian coast paying the landowners to allow them to be dug-up and moved by raft along the coastal waters to the park. Some of the trees are often over 100 years old. This process can take months and has involved in some areas removing many other trees and building roads to create access route. Because of this, Ivanishvili's actions have been met with protests from environmentalists and his political opponents, who have contended that his actions have destroyed topsoil and caused environmental devastation. The allegations of destruction include causing significant disturbance, soil damage, rock damage, denuding the landscape, and tree loss. The process of removing trees from elsewhere to the Park has been documented by the 2021 Georgian film Taming the Garden by Salomé Jashi.

In March 2016, Ivanishvili attracted international controversy for uprooting and relocating a 100-year-old tulip tree to the Shekvetili Dendrological Park. The tree, which weighed 650 tonnes, was transported from Georgia's Adjara region to the park, in an event that brought international attention to his activities. The event went viral on Georgian social media, with one user calling it "surreal." Environmental activist Nata Peradze lambasted the move, saying, "There are only a few dozen tulip trees in Georgia and this majestic 135-year-old specimen has zero chances of surviving replanting," while opposition television presenter Tamara Chergoleishvili mocked his interests in exotic flora and fauna by joking, "If he gets fanatically obsessed about gigantic mountains, then it will become a real headache for his people."

== Chairmanship of Georgian Dream, second resignation (2018–2023) ==
In 2018, Ivanishvili made a return to politics, being re-elected as the chairman of Georgian Dream on 26 April 2018. His return was perceived as a move to maintain the unity of the coalition.

During Ivanishvili's absence from politics, the government of Georgian Dream signed an Association Agreement with the European Union and the European Union lifted the visa requirements for Georgian citizens, but the ruling party continued to face allegations of being "pro-Russian" from the United National Movement and its allies in opposition. According to the Georgian Institute of Politics, as of 2017, Georgian Dream "has successfully withstood accusations by the opposition of being a pro-Russian political force".

Prior to the 2018 Georgian presidential election, the Georgian Dream made a decision not to nominate its own candidate but to support independent Salome Zourabichvili. This opened a window of opportunity for the United National Movement as Salome Zourabichvili failed to secure enough votes to win the election in the first round. On 5 November 2018, Ivanishvili addressed the public ahead of the presidential election runoff. He said that the people's dissatisfaction was understandable, although it would be a mistake to elect the opposition candidate Grigol Vashadze, who announced that he would pardon Bachana Akhalaia, Mikheil Saakashvili, and others "charged with torture and abuse". He promised that the situation in the country would change for the better in a year. The Cartu Foundation, owned by Ivanishvili, promised to completely cover debts for 600,000 citizens, which was criticized as a "blatant instance of vote buying".

On 20 June 2019, protests erupted in Tbilisi over the visit of Russian MP Sergei Gavrilov through the Interparliamentary Assembly on Orthodoxy. Amidst his visit, Gavrilov gave a speech on Russo-Georgian unity whilst seated in the Georgian parliament's speaker's chair. The protests grew violent and the police used the rubber bullets and tear gas to disperse the protesters. The demonstrations have been seen as reflecting public and elite frustration with the "normalization" policies the government has taken toward Russia. MP Zakaria Kutsnashvili, who organized the event, announced his resignation. Speaker of the Parliament of Georgia Irakli Kobakhidze also resigned from his position. The ruling party members, including Bidizna Ivanishvili, have claimed that Sergei Gavrilov arbitrarily sat in the Georgian parliament's speaker's chair, in violation of the protocol. After the dispersal, the protests continued on next days in front of the Georgian Parliament. On 24 June 2019, Bidzina Ivanishvili addressed the public, announcing a change to the electoral system from a mixed to fully proportional representation for the 2020 elections and lowering of the vote barrier for parties, in line with demands of protesters. However, in November 2019, majoritarian members of parliament (MPs elected from particular constituencies) from Georgian Dream blocked the electoral reform, couching their opposition to the amendments in terms of preserving the direct link between local areas and their directly elected representatives. It was speculated that they had been told to oppose the amendments by Ivanishvili himself since the reform would allegedly risk the Georgian Dream losing power. Ivanishvili said that he was disappointed with the parliament's decision to vote down the bill. Several lawmakers left the ruling party in protest. The protests renewed in front of the parliament building. After the ruling party and opposition held several rounds of talks, the consensus was reached over a mixed electoral system with a more proportional distribution of mandates.

On 11 January 2021, amidst the 2020–2021 Georgian political crisis, Ivanishvili announced that he was decisively leaving politics and resigned as Chairman of Georgian Dream, stating that "he had accomplished his goal".

Nika Melia, chairman of the United National Movement, was accused of organizing mass violence during the 2019 protests. When Melia declined to pay a US$12,000 bail, a Georgian court ruled that Melia should be detained before his trial. In response, Melia said the court's ruling was "unlawful", and on 18 February 2021, Prime Minister Giorgi Gakharia resigned over the disagreement with his party colleagues on enforcing an arrest order for him, saying that the arrest would be "untimely" and would only further exacerbate political crisis. The Parliament voted to replace Gakharia with Irakli Garibashvili, who was considered to be a close ally of Bidzina Ivanishvili, which led to speculations whether Ivanishvili continued to influence politics behind the scenes.

On 7 June 2021, in his first letter after leaving politics, Ivanishvili criticized Gakharia for his sudden resignation and departure from Georgian Dream for "an unheard-of reason – not to exercise the rule of law”, and labelled Gakharia's decision as treason to the ruling party and the country.

Ivanishvili allegedly maintained close business connections with Russian oligarchs, although Ivanishvili himself denounced such accusations. On 25 April 2022, two recordings were uploaded on YouTube by a channel under the name of Cyber Kmara, purportedly of a call between Ivanishvili and Vladimir Yevtushenkov about possible business dealings amidst the 2022 Russian invasion of Ukraine. Also implicated in the calls was Prime Minister Irakli Garibashvili, with Ivanishvili saying in the recording, "He is young and will take care of everything. I told him what to do and they are probably already meeting each other." Several members of Georgian Dream claimed that the recordings were faked, while others said that they don't see a problem with economic dealings between two private citizens.

Ivanishvili was accused of helping Yevtushenkov evade international sanctions by the opposition, with UNM General Secretary Petre Tsiskarishvili speculating on the possibility of sanctions on Ivanishvili. Opposition party Lelo for Georgia expressed concern about Garibashvili's involvement, demanding that he disclose relation about meeting with Russian envoys. Davyd Arakhamia, leader of the Ukrainian political party Servant of the People, urged EU and US leadership to consider imposing personal sanctions on Ivanishvili.

On 9 June 2022, the European Parliament issued a six-page resolution accusing the government of Georgia and Ivanishvili of eroding press freedom in the country. The resolution also described Ivanishvili as having "personal and business links to the Kremlin", and recommended that the European Union sanction Ivanishvili for "his role in the deterioration of the political process in Georgia." The resolution had a significant impact in Georgia, coming amidst a request for European Union candidate status.

Lithuanian MEPs Andrius Kubilius and Rasa Juknevičienė accused Ivanishvili of the "oligarchisation" of Georgia, and political polarisation as a result. The European Parliament has also described Ivanishvili as an oligarch, accusing him as having a "destructive" role in Georgia's politics and economy. European Council has listed "de-oligarchization" among 12 recommendations in order for the country to be granted status as a candidate for accession to the European Union. MEP Rasa Juknevičienė in her speech in the European Parliament has stated that ""De-oligarchization" means "de-Bidzinization" or "de-Ivanishvilization" of Georgia".

On 14 December 2022, the European Parliament has again called the European Council to sanction Ivanishvili, accusing him of deteriorating the democratic political process in Georgia and helping Russia to avoid the international sanctions.

Since 2022, Ivanishvili has been undergoing a legal battle with the Credit Suisse, a Swiss bank, involving a fraudulent scheme with the banker Patrice Lescaudron taking money from Ivanishvili's accounts to cover growing losses among others clients' portfolios. In the latest development, the Singapore court ordered the bank to pay $742.7 million in damages, confirming that the bank's trust had failed to safeguard its client's assets.

== Honorary chairman of Georgian Dream (2023–present) ==
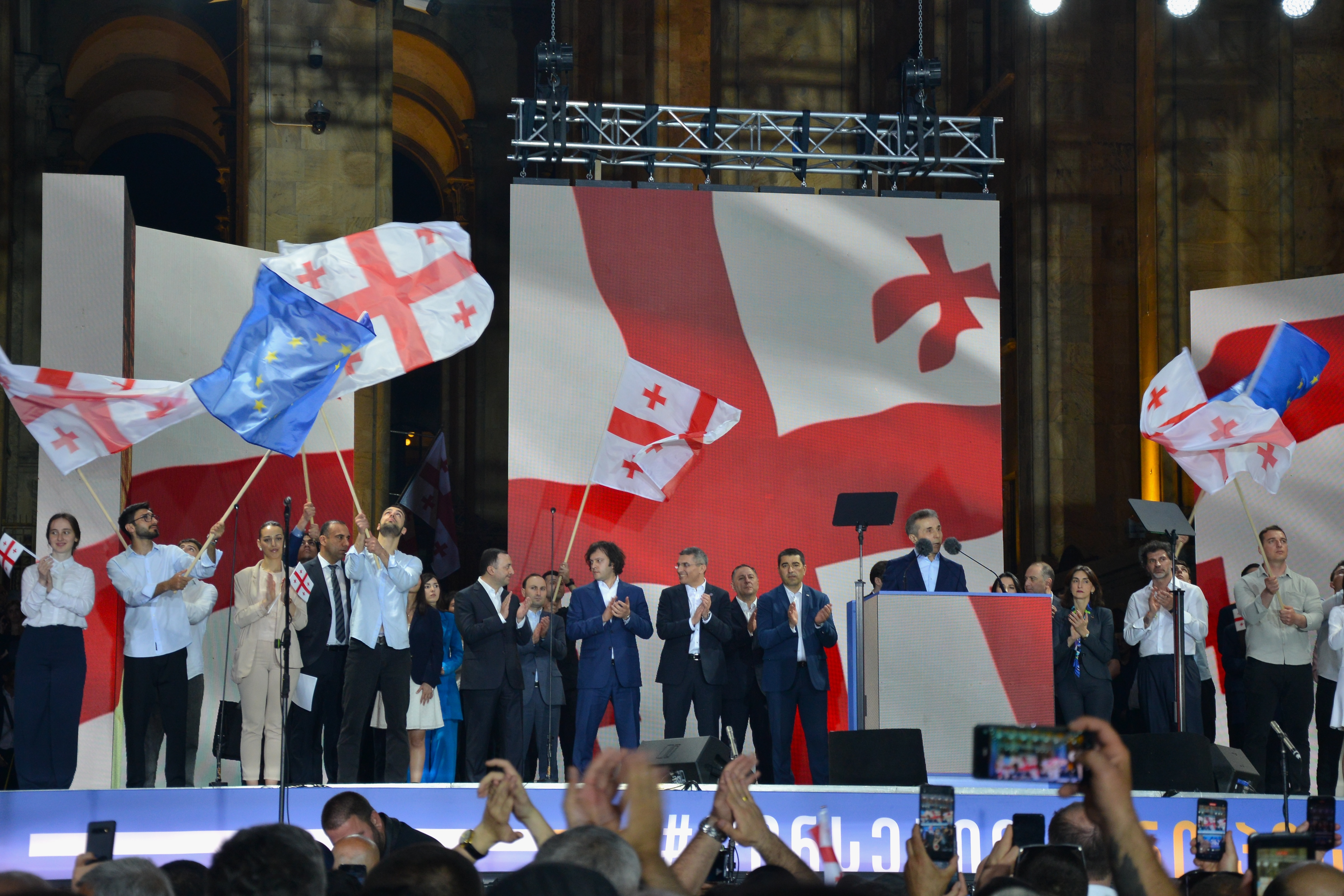
Bidzina Ivanishvili addressing a rally supporting the Georgian Law on Transparency of Foreign Influence, 29 April 2024

On 30 December 2023, Ivanishvili announced that he was returning to Georgian politics. He was elected as an honorary chairman by Georgian Dream. Many possible reasons have been cited for his return, including internal conflict within the Georgian Dream, decreasing support for the Georgian Dream among the populace (with Georgian Dream polling at 36.6% in December 2023 as opposed to 46.7% support it had in the last elections), or pressure from the West or Russia, including threats of international sanctions on Ivanishvili. In a speech posted online by the ruling party, Georgian Dream, Ivanishvili cited the "complicated" geopolitical situation and criticized the opposition for its perceived failure in holding the government accountable as reasons for his comeback. By late December 2024, he had become the de facto autocratic leader of Georgia.

In the wake of the 2024 Georgian post-election protests and the accompanying political violence, Ivanishvili was sanctioned by the United States and added to the Specially Designated Nationals and Blocked Persons (SDN) List for undermining Georgian democracy and advancing the interests of the Russian Federation. He was also sanctioned by several European Union member states.

In January 2025, James MacClearly, a UK Member of Parliament, introduced an Early Day Motion which called on the UK government to sanction Ivanishvili. In response, Georgian Dream defended Ivanishvili and claimed that the threat of sanctions was "without any foundation" and that Ivanishvili had brought "democratic breakthrough to the country".

== Political views ==
Bidzina Ivanishvili has expressed support for Georgia's membership in the European Union and NATO. After meeting with then President of Georgia Mikheil Saakashvili in October 2012, Ivanishvili has stated that they have "concurring [opinions] about foreign policy issues". Ivanishvili has said that Georgia's accession to the EU and NATO would be his foreign policy priorities. He has additionally noted that "strategic partnership with the United States has a huge importance."

Ivanishvili has also expressed support for normalization of relations with Russia. He argues that it will not only lower risks of a new military conflict between the two countries, but also bring the stability in the region which will also help Georgia's accession to the EU and NATO. It will make easier for Tbilisi to pursue greater cooperation with NATO and the EU, which will facilitate contacts and help convince the West that Georgia is a reliable partner; conversely, instability might cause the EU and NATO to back away from these ties. According to Ivanishvili, it is important for Georgia's accession to the European Union and NATO to convince Russia that this process will not create any existential threats to Moscow. Ivanishvili has stated that normalization of relations with Russia should start with improving economic and cultural relations, stressing the importance of the Russian market for Georgian agriculture and economy. Russia was the primary destination for Georgian agricultural products before the 2006 embargo, which has heavily affected the Georgian economy. Ivanishvili said that he will combine the restoration of constructive relations with Russia with aspiring towards NATO at the same time.

Ivanishvili has stated that his task is to resolve Abkhaz–Georgian and Georgian–Ossetian conflicts and restore the territorial integrity of Georgia. He has noted that Georgia "should become a democratic state, based on rule of law, attractive state for Abkhazians and Ossetians." He has said that reintegration of Abkhazia and South Ossetia should happen on the basis of peaceful dialogue and concurrence in interests. Ivanishvili criticized Saakashvili's handling of the August 2008 war with Russia and the self-proclaimed republics of South Ossetia and Abkhazia — claiming that although Russia had provoked the conflict, the actual fighting had been started by Georgia.

Ivanishvili's political views, as expressed in his 2024 interview with pro-government channel Imedi, reflects a blend of anti-Western sentiment, social conservatism, and populist rhetoric designed to consolidate his power and discredit political opponents. The interview, aired just days before Georgia's crucial parliamentary elections, highlighted his disdain for liberal democratic norms and Western influence while promoting a narrative of Georgia as a nation under siege by external forces and their domestic allies.

Ivanishvili reiterated his belief in a conspiracy led by "certain bureaucrats" in the West who, he claimed, were working with Georgia's opposition to destabilize the country. He introduced the term "global war party" to describe these alleged actors, a rebranding of the "deep state" conspiracy theory often used to undermine trust in democratic institutions. Accusing the opposition of fabricating a "virtual reality" to mislead the Georgian public, Ivanishvili portrayed himself and his Georgian Dream party as defenders of sovereignty against foreign manipulation. While railing against Western interference, he left the door open to a potential rapprochement with the United States, reflecting strategic ambiguity in his rhetoric.

In the interview, Ivanishvili addressed concerns about democratic backsliding, dismissing allegations of growing authoritarianism despite mounting evidence, including Georgia's significant drop in press freedom rankings. He cited a “fairly positive” interim report by the OSCE to defend his government's record while ignoring its critical findings on low public trust, voter intimidation, and misuse of administrative resources. His claim that Georgia had a “genuine democracy” due to the presence of multiple TV stations contradicted reports highlighting the challenges faced by the media, including smear campaigns, physical threats, and restrictive legislation.

One of the most controversial aspects of the interview was Ivanishvili's focus on LGBTQ+ issues, where he perpetuated transphobic and homophobic myths to appeal to conservative voters. Referring to queer advocacy as "LGBT propaganda", he claimed to have evidence of its harmful effects, citing baseless examples such as pride events in Barcelona involving "orgies" and children. He further alleged that Western countries were forcing parents to provide gender reassignment surgeries for their children, punishing teachers for acknowledging biological sex, and introducing policies like placing sanitary pads in men's bathrooms. Ivanishvili mocked these efforts with references to "men's milk" being equated to women's milk, using such claims to ridicule gender inclusivity and justify restrictive laws targeting LGBTQ+ communities introduced by Georgian Dream earlier in the year.

Ivanishvili also reiterated threats against his political rivals, particularly the pro-Western opposition, accusing them of aligning with international forces to provoke conflict with Russia. He singled out Giorgi Gakharia, a former ally and chair of the For Georgia party, alleging that Gakharia sought to drag the country into war. These accusations, coupled with Ivanishvili's portrayal of the opposition as adherents of a "pseudo-liberal ideology", served to delegitimize his critics and consolidate his base.

Throughout the interview, Ivanishvili attempted to justify Georgian Dream's prolonged grip on power by framing it as a necessity during Russia's full-scale invasion and occupation of Ukraine. Describing the war as a transformative event, he claimed it had created "exceptional circumstances" that required his government's leadership, dismissing criticisms of his rule as either exaggerated or fabricated by the opposition.

== Wealth ==
In March 2010, Ivanishvili ranked 173 in 2010 Forbes List of Billionaires, with a reported net worth of US$4.8 billion. The following year he ranked 185 in the 2011 Forbes List with a reported net worth of US$5.5 billion. In March 2012, Ivanishvili was ranked at number 153 in Forbes magazine's annual list of the world's billionaires with an estimated worth of $6.4 billion, making him Georgia's richest person. His total net worth is one third of Georgia's gross domestic product.

Ivanishvili appeared in the Panama Papers, Pandora Papers, and Suisse Secrets. He has millions of dollars' worth of undisclosed real estate in Russia.

Forbes's has described the secret to his success as, "[buying] firms not needed by anybody for tens of millions of dollars and sold them for billions of dollars." In 1990, Ivanishvili and Malkin established Rossiysky Kredit, now Ivanishvili's biggest holding. Over the years, he has sold other businesses accumulated by him during the privatization era in Russia, investing the proceeds in the Russian stock market.

Ivanishvili has also invested money into hotels, including Hotel Lux, and in a Russian chain of drugstores known as "Doctor Stoletov". He has also purchased four properties in downtown Moscow for the construction of a luxury hotel.

In 2023, Forbes estimated his fortune at $4.9 billion and ranked Ivanishvili as the world's 544th richest person.

Ivanishvili purchased artwork by Pablo Picasso and the contemporary artist Peter Doig at international auctions. He bought Niko Pirosmani's Arsenal Hill at Night, paying a record US$1.5 million for a painting by a Georgian artist. He then donated the painting to the State Museum of Arts of Georgia.

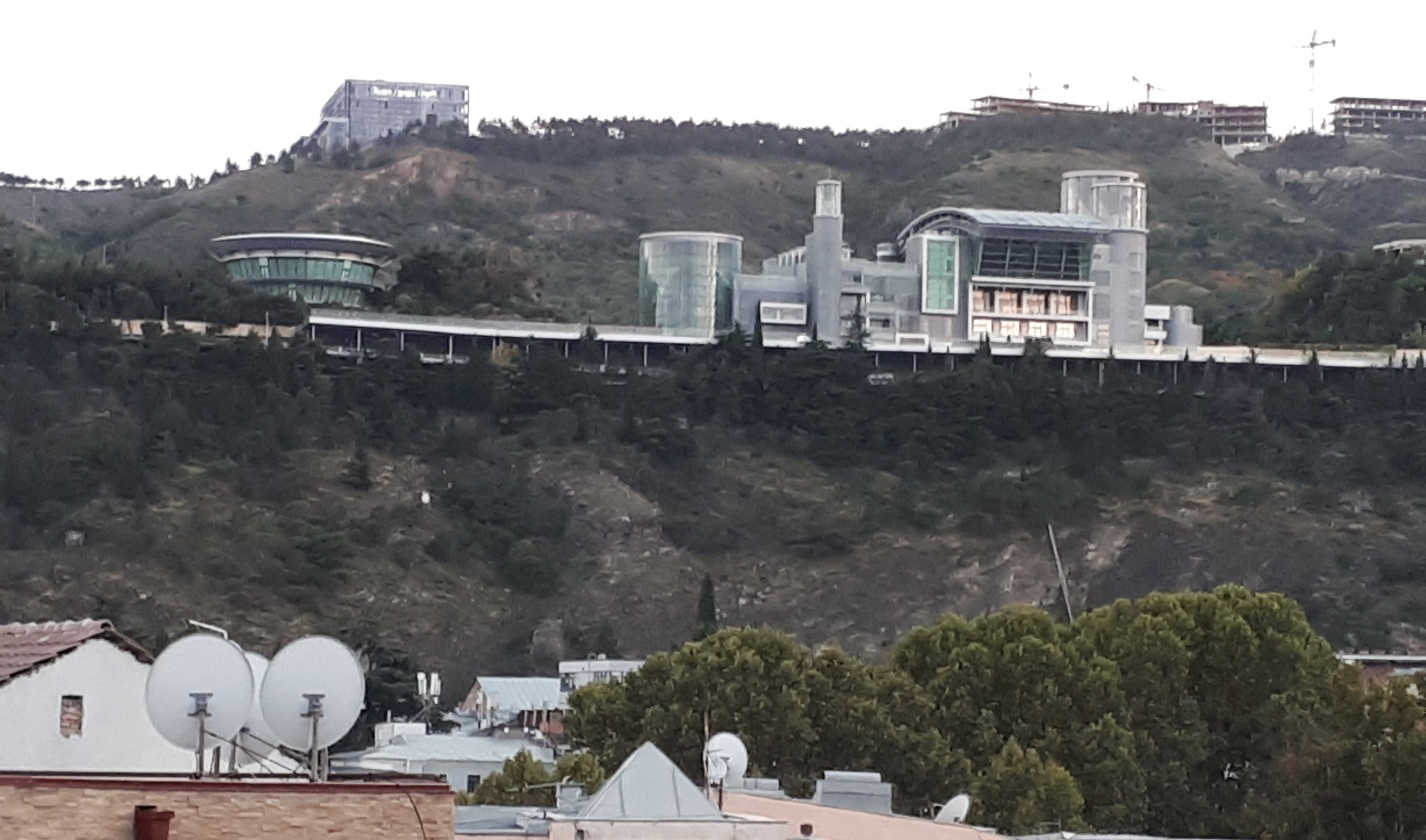
Ivanishvili's business centre and residence

Bidzina Ivanishvili, together with his wife Ekaterine Khvedelidze, founded the Cartu International Charity Foundation in 1995. The Ivanishvili family is the only donor of the foundation, and its projects were implemented with the foundation's funds. The Cartu Foundation has invested in various projects, such as the arts, sports, agriculture, and infrastructure. The Cartu Foundation donated to support the restoration of the Batumi Botanical Garden. Ivanishvili's name is attached to many public projects: repairs to the Tbilisi State University, a seaside amusement park, a ski resort, national parks, medical clinics, etc.

== Personal life ==
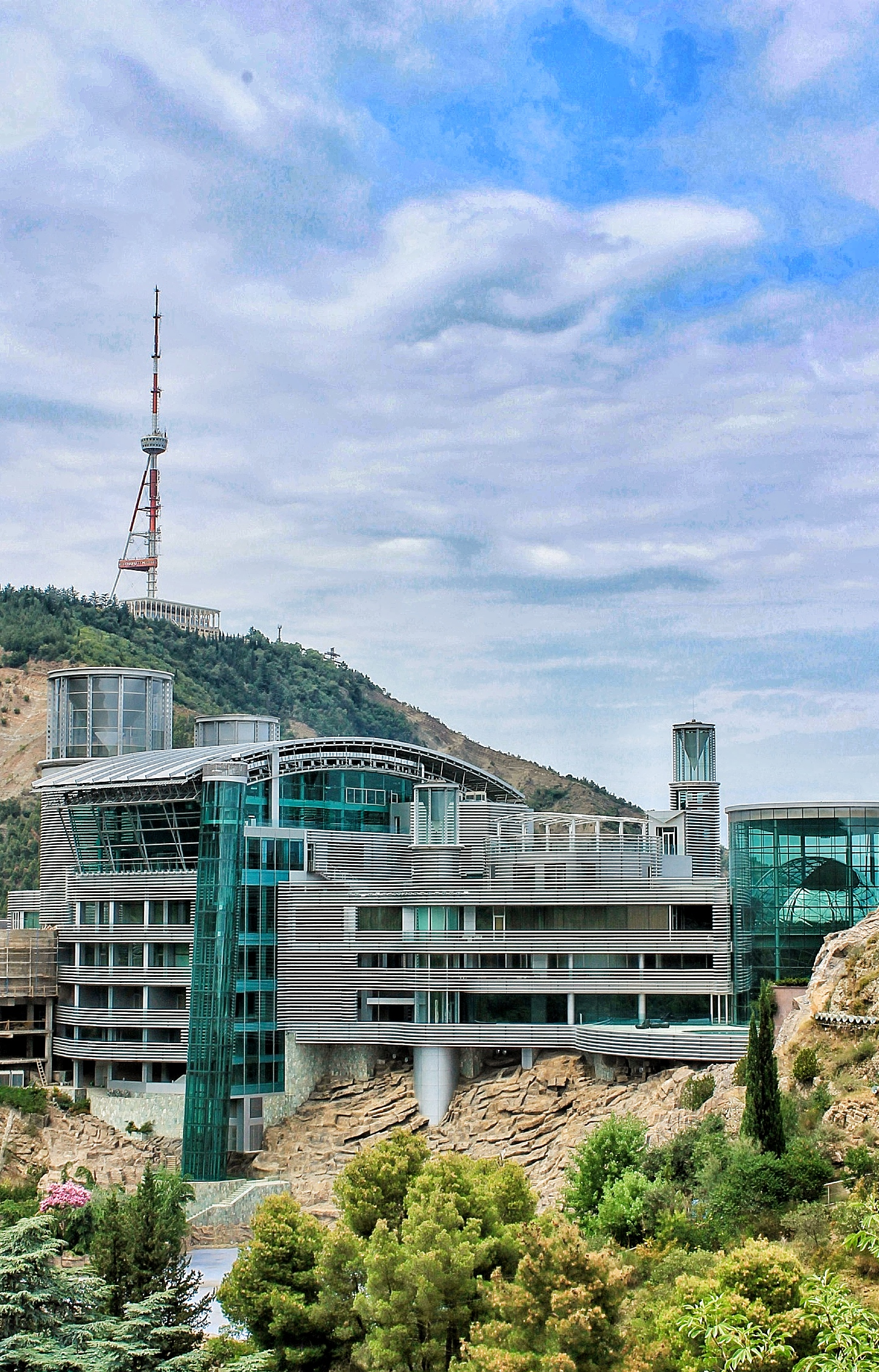
Ivanishvili's residence in Tbilisi, designed by Shin Takamatsu

Ivanishvili owns several estates, including a mansion above Tbilisi which is worth an estimated US$50 million and specially designed for him by Russian architect Mikhail Khazanov and finished by famous Japanese architect Shin Takamatsu.

Ivanishvili is also known by the Russian first name Boris, which he previously used while working in Russia. He was widely reported under that name in the West. However, he went back to his Georgian first name, Bidzina, in 2011.

Ivanishvili married Ekaterine "Eka" Khvedelidze in October 1991. They have four children together, three sons, Uta, Bera (a well-known singer and rapper in Georgia), Tsotne, and a daughter, Gvantsa; Bera and Tsotne both have albinism.

Additionally, Ivanishvili has been known to the public as a collector of exotic animals, including sharks, lemurs, and a kangaroo. During the 2012 Georgian parliamentary election, his animal collection attracted attention, with a headline in The New Republic being titled, "Georgia’s Next Leader May Be a Billionaire Zookeeper with Albino Rapper Children."

=== Citizenship ===
Ivanishvili was granted Georgian citizenship by President Mikheil Saakashvili. In March 2010, Ivanishvili additionally attained French citizenship. In October 2011, he was deprived of his Georgian citizenship "according to Article 32 of the Georgian Law on Citizenship" (which lists grounds for loss of citizenship, including "accept[ing] citizenship of another state"), shortly after he had announced his intention to form a political party to challenge Saakashvili.

In January 2012, Ivanishvili sought to regain his Georgian citizenship via naturalization, but was denied. In October 2012, President Saakashvili restored Ivanishvili's Georgian citizenship under a legal provision that empowers the president to grant citizenship in the interest of the state. As Georgian legislation prohibits naturalized citizens from retaining citizenship of another country, Ivanishvili indicated that he would withdraw from French citizenship upon regaining Georgian citizenship, and had filed paperwork to do so. However, Ivanishvili subsequently stopped the process of cancelling his French citizenship and, as of 2024, the media continued to report that Ivanishvili remained a citizen of France.

== Honours ==
Ivanishvili was Honorary Consul of the Republic of San Marino in Georgia from 2000 to 2012.

=== National honours ===
Georgian Orthodox Church:

  - Saint George Golden Order

=== Foreign honours ===
France:

- : Knight of France's Legion of Honour (31 December 2020).

== See also ==
- List of Legion of Honour recipients by name (I)
- Legion of Honour Museum

== Notes ==
Political offices
Preceded by Vano Merabishvili	Prime Minister of Georgia; 2012–2013	Succeeded by Irakli Garibashvili
New post	Chairman of Georgian Dream; 2012–2013	Succeeded by Irakli Garibashvili
Preceded by Giorgi Kvirikashvili	Chairman of Georgian Dream; 2018–2021	Succeeded by Irakli Garibashvili
Honorary titles
New post	Honorary Chairman of Georgian Dream; 2023–present	Incumbent
