= Bera Ivanishvili =

Georgian singer, rapper, songwriter, record producer and entrepreneur

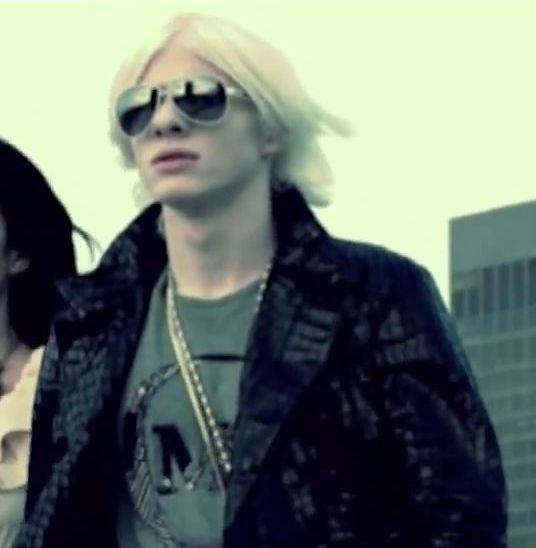
- Ivanishvili in 2013
- Born: 23 December 1994 (age 31); Paris, France
- Citizenship: Georgian
- Occupations: Singer; rapper; songwriter; record producer; entrepreneur
- Spouse: Nanuka Gudavadze (m. 2018)
- Children: 2
- Parent: Bidzina Ivanishvili (father)
- Musical career
- Origin: Tbilisi, Georgia
- Genres: Hip hop; R&B; pop
- Instruments: Vocals; Violin; Piano; Guitar; Drums
- Years active: 2010–present
- Label: Georgian Dream
- Website: beraofficial.com

Bera Ivanishvili (Georgian: ბერა ივანიშვილი; born 23 December 1994), also known as simply Bera, is a Georgian singer, rapper, songwriter, record producer, and entrepreneur. Ivanishvili established his music career in both Georgia and the United States, and is additionally the founder of the Georgian record label and production studio Georgian Dream.

== Early life ==
Ivanishvili was born in Paris on 23 December 1994 to Georgian parents Bidzina Ivanishvili and Ekaterine Khvedelidze. His family returned to Georgia after his birth, settling in Tbilisi. Ivanishvili is the second of four children; his siblings include brothers Uta and Tsotne, and sister Gvantsa. He was born with the condition albinism; Ivanishvili's brother Tsotne also has the condition.

== Career ==
Ivanishvili began experimenting with music as a child, and was classically trained. By age four, he could play piano, drums, and the violin. Ivanishvili went on to begin his music career officially in 2010, working with producers such as Rodney Jerkins, and later released his debut single "My Favourite Things" in 2011. Later in 2011, Ivanishvili founded the record label and music studio Georgian Dream Studio, where he worked with other Georgian musicians such as Nina Sublatti. The name went on to become influential in Georgian society, with his father Bidzina Ivanishvili launching his political party of the same name around the same time. Bera released the single "Georgian Dream" in support of his father's political aspirations. In 2012, Ivanishvili released his debut studio album Gpirdepi. In 2018, Ivanishvili received widespread attention after releasing the single "Legalize". The song sought to protest the restrictive drug laws passed by the Parliament of Georgia, and stand in solidarity with protesters demonstrating against the violent anti-drug raids by police forces at nightclubs such as Bassiani.

Bera collaborated with Kiff No Beat on their song "Ne Change Rien", Patoranking on "Fire to the Sun" and "Wilmer".

As of 2023, Bera and his wife maintain a major presence on TikTok, with more than 7m followers.

== Personal life ==
Ivanishvili married Georgian model and fashion blogger Nanuka Gudavadze in November 2018 in an Orthodox service at Svetitskhoveli Cathedral in Mtskheta, after having dated for several months and gotten engaged that September. The guests were asked to send a donation to local foster home organizations instead of buying gifts. In April 2019, they confirmed that Gudavadze was pregnant with their first child, which was later confirmed to be a boy the following month. Their son was born in November 2019. In November 2022, the couple confirmed via Instagram that they're expecting another baby. In March 2023, they posted some photos of their new baby named Dadu Ivanishvili, together with their first born, Beruka.

== Controversy ==
As the son of Georgia's richest man and founder of Georgia's ruling party Bidzina Ivanishvili, Bera Ivanishvili is accused of using high-level government officials to track and terrorize people who insult him and criticize his music on social media, including minors. In 2021, phone recordings became public that appeared to implicate current government officials of Georgia in attempts to track and intimidate people, including minors, who had been dismissive of Bera Ivanishvili and his music on social media. Prime Minister Irakli Garibashvili, a close confidant of Bera's father, is heard encouraging the retributions on the covertly recorded tapes. Ivanishvili and the ruling Georgian Dream party claimed that conversations were faked and audio recordings (which were then edited) were illegally obtained by the previous government (now opposition) in 2010 - a time when Bera was himself a minor and his father had not yet entered politics. The Georgian Chief Prosecutor’s Office announced that the recordings were doctored, a conclusion which opposition denounced as "ridiculous". Non-governmental organization Human Rights Education and Monitoring Center pointed out that the audio shows "the extremely severe forms of dismantling state institutions".

== Discography ==
=== Albums ===
| Title | Details |
|---|---|
| Gpirdebi | Released: 2012; Label: Georgian Dream; Format: CD, digital download |

=== Singles ===
| Year | Title |
|---|---|
| 2011 | "My Favourite Things" |
| 2011 | "Don't Worry" |
| 2011 | "Georgian Dream" |
| 2011 | "Hip Hop Waltz" |
| 2012 | "Gpirdepi" |
| 2012 | "Otsnebebis ghame" |
| 2013 | "Summertime" (featuring Lil Playy) |
| 2013 | "Samudamod" |
| 2014 | "Calypso Lover" |
| 2015 | "Don't Go" |
| 2015 | "I Look Good on You" |
| 2016 | "Shining like a Star" |
| 2016 | "Tickets to the Movies" |
| 2016 | "If This Isn't Love" |
| 2016 | "Long Live" |
| 2016 | "I Can See It Now (Christmas Song)" |
| 2017 | "Three Words" |
| 2017 | "Untouchable" |
| 2017 | "Parlez-vous français" |
| 2018 | "Fire to the Sun" (featuring Patoranking) |
| 2018 | "Chemo dzmao" (with Zaza Nozadze) |
| 2018 | "Legalize" |
| 2019 | "She Said Yes" |
| 2020 | "Mi Amor" (with Claudia Leitte) |
| 2023 | "Christmas on the Beach" |
