= Stay Jay =

- Also known as: Kojo Stylish
- Born: William Kojo Johnson; 5 January 1986 (age 39); Tema, Ghana
- Origin: Tema, Ghana
- Genres: Afropop, hiplife, afrobeat
- Occupation(s): Rapper, singer, songwriter
- Years active: 2011–present
- Labels: ASB Music

William Kojo Johnson (born 5 January 1986) known by the stage name Stay Jay is a Ghanaian hip hop and afrobeat artist, songwriter and performer from Tema. He is best known for his hit single "Shashee Wowo" produced by Ghanaian producer Killbeatz, which gained popularity in Ghana and other parts of the world.

He won the best new artiste of the year at the 2012 Ghana Music Awards and also gained 6 other nominations.

He is one of the main pillars of Azonto in Ghana.

== Early life and music career ==
Stay Jay was born and raised in Tema where he began making music in his early school days. He studied at the Tema Regular Baptist School in Community 10 and then attended Tema Methodist Day Secondary School with the likes of Sarkodie, Stonebwoy, Mix Master Garzy, Piesie Super, Eno Barony and many others.

He started as an underground rapper taking part in rap battles at kasahare level at a local radio station in Ghana called Adom FM. Stay Jay was signed by Unda One Entertainment under which he recorded most of his hit songs. After years of working with the management of Unda One Entertainment and signing a deal was due, he then set up his own record label which is ASB MUSIC (African StarBoi Music). Stay Jay has shared the stage with Spliff Star, Busta Rhymes, Rick Ross and more.

In 2015, Stay Jay endorsed Kalahari Bitters and Airforce Bitters for Kasapreko Company Limited which he made a sound track.

Stay Jay has released several other popular singles over the years, including "My Baby", "I Dey Do My Thing", "Yenko Nkoaa" and "Feelings". He has also performed at numerous concerts and events throughout Africa, including Ghana Independence Concert hosted at O2 Arena London and the Perth Festival in Australia. Stay Jay has also sold out concert in France, Belgium, Germany, Holland and other European countries.

=== 2011: Repetition album ===
Stay Jay first album Repetition was released in 2011 under his then record label UndaOne Entertainment. The album was an instant hit with songs like Shashee wowo and Sue featuring rapper Sarkodie and Dr Cryme getting massive airplay throughout the country.

== Awards and nominations ==
Ghana Music Awards
Year	Nominated work	Award	Result	Ref
2012	Himself	Best New Artist of the Year	Won	
2012	Himself	Hiplife/Hiphop Artiste of the Year	Nominated	
2012	Yenko Nkoaa	Best Collaboration of the Year	Nominated	
2012	Shashee Wowo	Hiplife Song of the Year	Nominated	
2012	Shashee Wowo	Most Popular Song of the Year	Nominated	
2012	Repetition	Album of the Year	Nominated	

Tema Citizens Club Awards Holland
Year	Nominated work	Award	Result	Ref
2012	Himself	Tema Citizens of the Year	Won	
2012	Himself	Akwaaba Holland	Won	

Ghana Lifetime Achievement and Distinguished Awards, USA
Year	Nominated work	Award	Result	Ref
2022	Himself	Distinguished Achievement Awards for Highlife Music	Nominated	

== Discography ==
=== Albums ===
- Repetition

=== Singles ===
- Sue (ft. Sarkodie & Dr Cryme)
- My Love (ft. Jay Ghartey)
- Tema Party (ft. Big Twist)
- My Baby (ft. Mugeez)
- Twaame Lala
- Prepaid Gurl
- Baby Lace (ft Mr Eazi)
- Den Tin Som
- I Don’t Think Far Remix - Lil Win x Strongman x Medikal x Yaa Pono x Kwaw Kese x Stay Jay x Opanka
- Gbohe ft Luther
- All Be Lie
- Yenko Nkoaa ft Eduwordzi
- Swagger - Ruff n Smooth x Stay Jay
- Feelings ft Lil Win
- Goodness & Mercy
- Wo Play
- Mugu ft 4×4
- Dw3
- Chocolate ft Kuami Eugene
- 16years ft Medikal
- Odo ft Kosi Sia

== Personal life ==
Stay Jay is in a relationship with Helena Adjabeng.
