= Chorvila =

Chorvila ჭორვილა
- Village
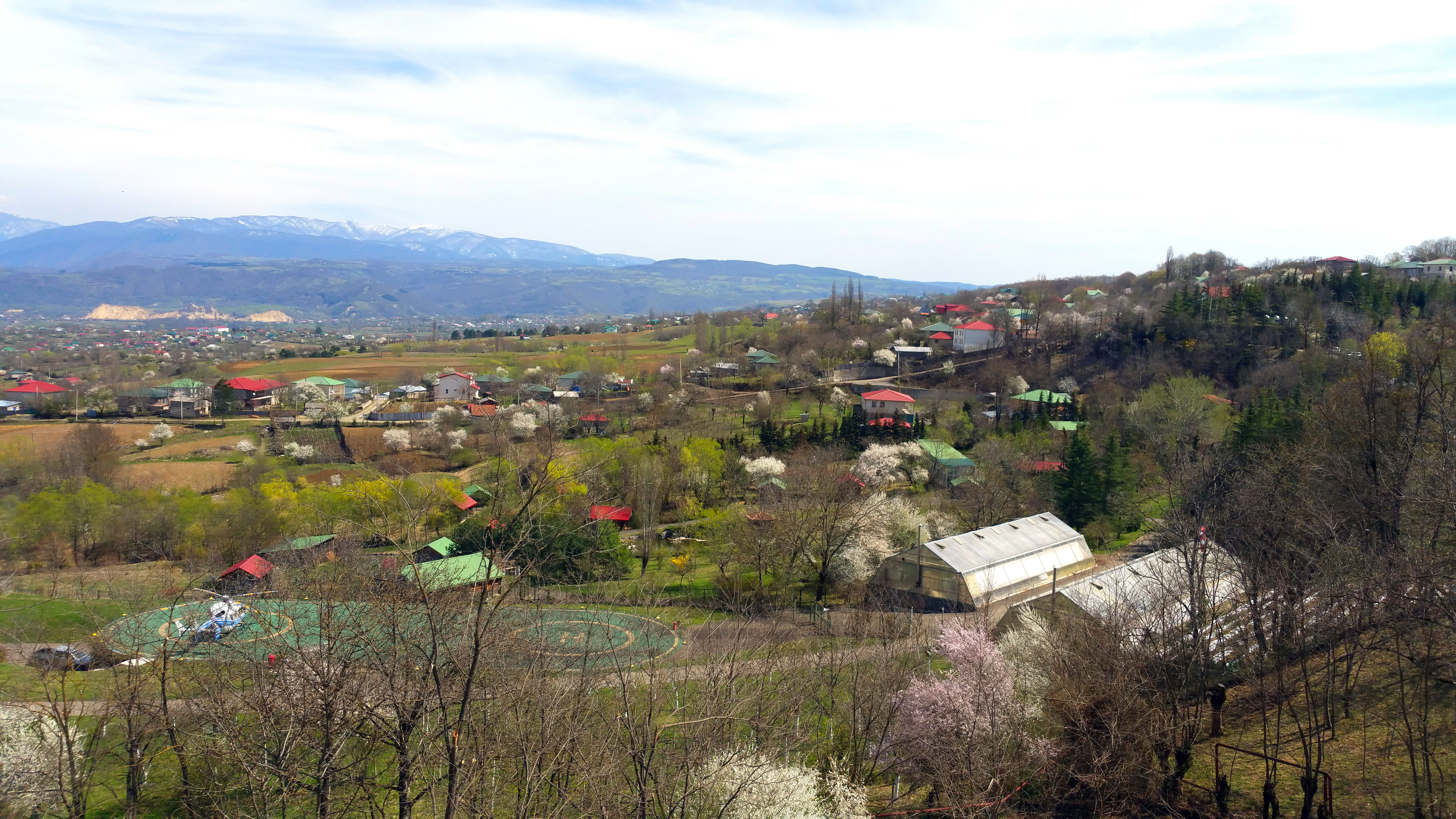

- Location within Georgia
- Coordinates: 42°17′21″N 43°24′52″E
- Country: Georgia
- Region: Imereti
- District: Sachkhere District
- First mention: 12th century
- Elevation: 760 m (2,490 ft)

Population (2014)
  - Total: 1,451
- Time zone: UTC+4 (Georgian Time)

Chorvila (Georgian: ჭორვილა) is a village located in the Imereti region of western Georgia, best known for being the birthplace of Bidzina Ivanishvili.

== Notable people ==
- Bidzina Ivanishvili (1956–), businessman and politician who was Prime Minister of Georgia from 2012 to 2013

== See also ==
- Imereti
