= Mix Master Garzy =

Ghanaian record producer (born 1988)

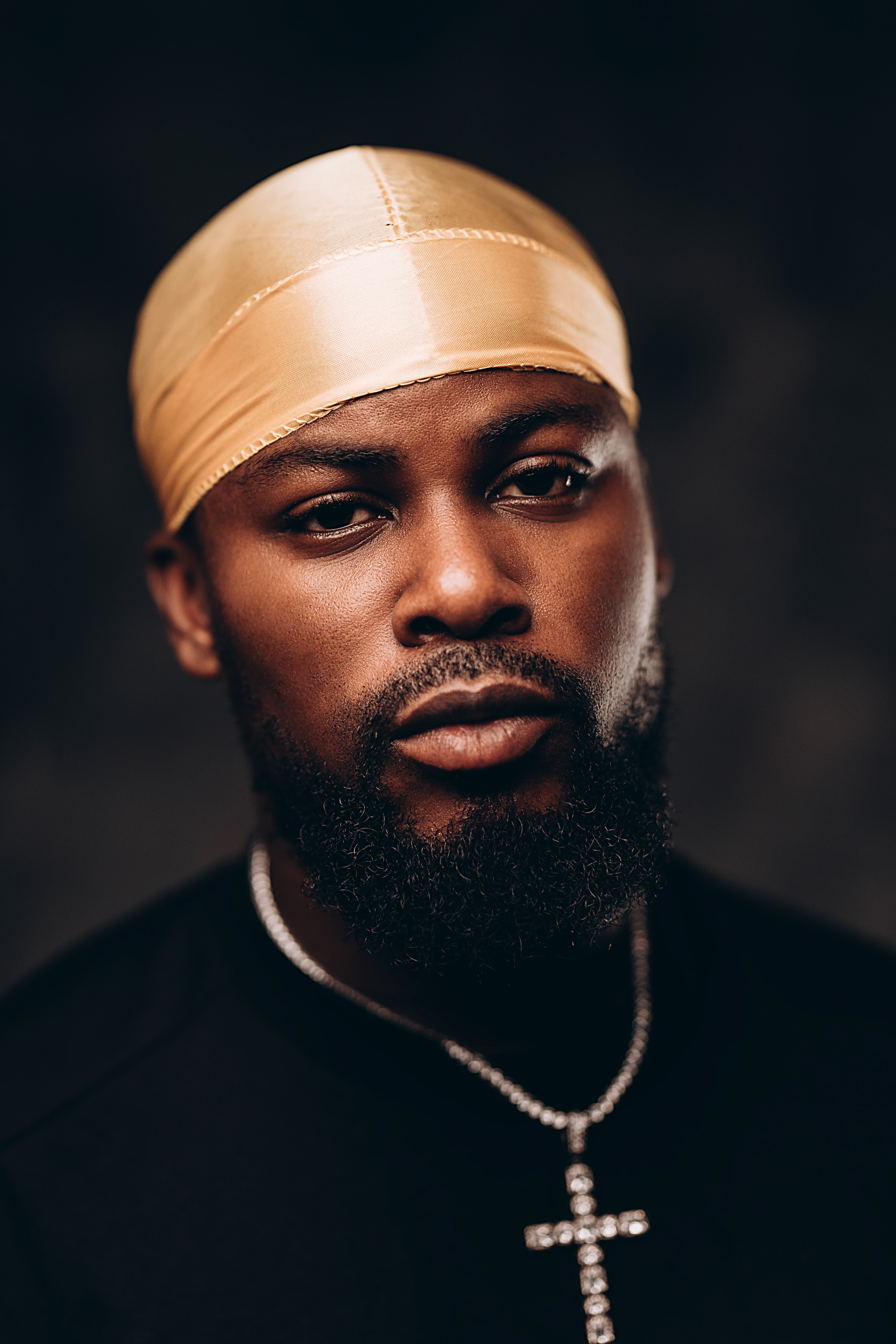

Background information
- Also known as: Mix Master Garzy
- Born: Benjamin Mensah Garzy; 7 July 1988 (age 38); Tema, Ghana
- Origin: Volta Region, Ghana
- Genres: Afrobeats; afropop; hiplife; dancehall; hip hop; R&B
- Occupations: Record Producer, sound engineer, disc jockey,
- Instruments: synthesizer, piano, Drums, sampler, Bass Guitar
- Years active: 2008–present
- Label: 2MG Music

Benjamin Mensah Garzy (born 7 July 1988), known professionally as Mix Master Garzy, is a Ghanaian record producer, sound engineer, disc jockey and singer.

His major productions include "Pull Up" by Stonebwoy, "My Baby" by Stay Jay ft. R2Bees, "Boom boom tag" by Mista Silva, GH UK based "Enemies" by Jupitar featuring Sarkodie in 2014, "Iskoki" by Samini, "KoKo Sakora" by Dr Cryme featuring Sarkodie, "Alhaji" by VVIP featuring Patoranking, "Hookah" by Danagog featuring Davido, "Love You Die" by Patoranking featuring Diamond Platnumz, "Na Wash" by Becca, and "Obia Agye Obi Girl" by Captain Planet of 4x4 and more.

== Early life ==
Garzy was born in to Francis Anim Garzy and Ernestina Abena Kwao. He has a younger brother, Johnson Otoo Kwao. He had his basic education and junior secondary education at Better Best Academy in Tema 4 poles, Ghana. He continued his senior high education at Tema Methodist Senior High School. He later attended the Ghana Institute of Journalism and obtained a certificate and diploma in Broadcast Journalism which gave him a step ahead to work as a part-time DJ at Xfm and Urban Internet Radio in Ghana.

== Career ==
Mix Master Garzy commenced his career in beat making, mixing and mastering right from junior high school. After production work began he surfaced with his pro name Mix Master Garzy, an identity referring to the mixing and mastering side of studio work.

In 2015, he produced a master banger song, "Iskoki", for Samini. The song was nominated at that year's Vodafone Ghana Music Awards.

Garzy has worked with notable artists such as Atumpan, Samini, Sarkodie, Stonebwoy, Shatta Wale, Davido, Patoranking, Diamond Platnumz, Ice Prince, R2Bees, Becca, Eno Barony, Lyrical Joe and Eazzy.

== Awards and recognition ==
He was nominated in the category of "Producer of the Year" at the 2015 Vodafone Ghana Music Awards.

He won "Riddim of the Year" at the 2016 Bass Awards for producing "iphone riddim", exclusive instrumental recorded by Mugeez of R2 Bees fame, Shatta Wale, Samini, Brenya, Ricky Mo, Capone, and Flexclusive.

On June 4, 2017, Garzy was given the Prestigious Gold Coast Award for his outstanding work in the Ghanaian music scene.

In 2017, he won "Best Music Producer of the year" at the Ghana Entertainment Awards organized in the US.

== Awards and nominations ==
Year	Award ceremony	Award title	Result	Ref.
2012	GH/UK Afrobeat Award	Youngest Producer	Won	
2014	Mtn Hit Maker Reality Show	Best Producer of The Year	Won	
2015	Vodafone Ghana Music Awards	Producer of The Year	Nominated	
2016	Bass Awards	Riddim of The Year	Won	
2016	4SYTE MVAs 2016	Most Nominated Work	Won	
2017	Ghana Entertainment Awards - USA	Best Music Producer of The year	Won	
2017	The Gold Coast Prestigious Awards	Awards for Excellence	Won	
2017	Bass Awards	Producer of the Year	Won	
2018	Vodafone Ghana Music Awards	Producer of The Year	Nominated	
2018	Ghana Music Awards - South Africa	Best Music Producer of The year	Won	
2018	3rd TV Music Video Awards - Ghana	Best Music Producer of The year	Won	
2019	Ghana Entertainment Awards - USA	Best Music Producer of The year	Won	
2019	Mtn Hit Maker Reality Show - Ghana	Best Producer of The Year	Won	
2019	African Talent Awards - Côte d'Ivoire	African Music Producer of The Year	Nominated	
2021	Ghana Music Awards - UK	Producer of The Year	Won	
2024	Telecel Ghana Music Awards (TGMA) - Ghana	Audio Engineer of The Year	Won	

== Tours ==
- In 2016, he had a successful European tour, "Book a studio with Mix Master Garzy".
- In 2017 Garzy joined Nigeria's super star Patoranking on his exclusive European tour to launch his God Over Everything album, and was also the DJ for Patoranking on the tour.
- Coke Studio Africa 2017
- Master Garzy appeared on the "Come From Far Europe Tour" with Ghanaian dance hall artist stonebwoy in 2017.
