= Patoranking =

Nigerian singer and songwriter (born 1990)

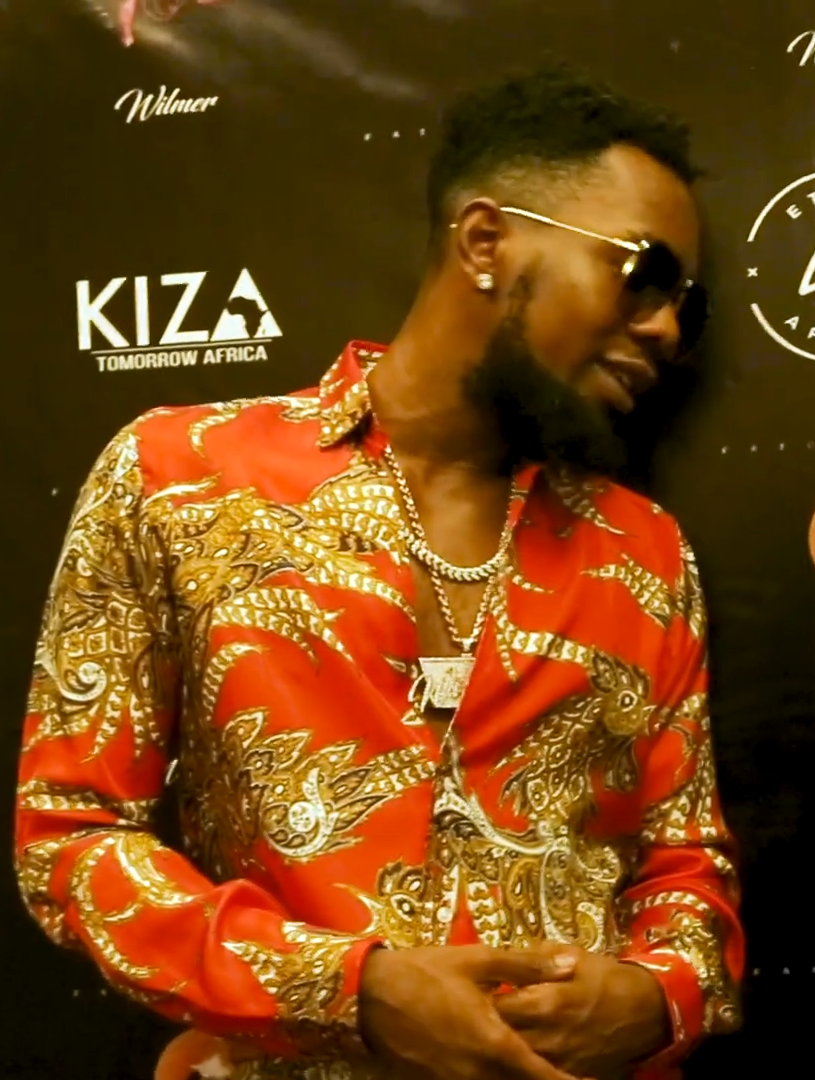
- Patoranking

Background information
- Born: Patrick Nnaemeka Okorie; 27 May 1990 (age 36); Ijegun-Egba, Lagos State, Nigeria
- Genres: Afrobeats; reggae; dancehall
- Occupations: Singer; songwriter
- Instrument: Vocals
- Years active: 2009–present
- Labels: Amari Musiq; VP Records

Patrick Nnaemeka Okorie (born 27 May 1990), better known as Patoranking, is a Nigerian singer and songwriter. A native of Ebonyi State, Patoranking was born in Ijegun-Egba, Lagos State. He started his music career doing underground collaborations with artists such as XProject, Konga, Slam, and Reggie Rockstone.

Patoranking signed a record deal with K-Solo's Igberaga Records in 2010, and released the single "Up in D Club" that same year. He became a protégé of Dem Mama Records after recording the track "Alubarika" with Timaya. In November 2014, Patoranking signed with Foston Musik and gained recognition after releasing "Girlie O". On 9 February 2015, he announced on Instagram that he signed a distribution deal with VP Records.

== Life and music career ==
=== 1990–2013: Early life and career beginnings ===
A native of Ebonyi State, Patrick Nnaemeka Okorie was born on 27 May 1990, in Ijegun-Egba, Satellite Town, Lagos. He attended Citizen Comprehensive College in Epe, Lagos, and later enrolled at Jibril Martin Memorial Grammar School in Iponri. Patoranking moved to Ghana in 2007 after gaining admission to the University of Cape Coast, but dropped out due to financial constraints. He later moved to Osu, Accra, where he met Lanky, an entrepreneur who signed him to Black Rhythmz Entertainment. Patoranking worked at a restaurant and held another job at Accra Mall while signed to Black Rhythmz Entertainment. After recording a few songs on Black Rhythmz Entertainment, he left the label and returned to Nigeria.

Patoranking joined K-Solo's Igberaga Records in 2012 upon returning to Nigeria. That same year, he recorded the Drumphase-produced track "Iya Bisi", which features vocals by Qdot and Kbaj. Patoranking told Entertainment Express that Qdot and Kbaj helped compose "Iya Bisi" by sharing ideas with him. Other songs the singer recorded with Igberaga Records include "Tonight", "Park Well", and "So Nice". Patoranking told Entertainment Express that his stage name was given to him by a Jamaican artist whom he met at Alpha Beach in Lagos. He has cited Buju Banton, Bob Marley, Fela Kuti, Lucky Dube, Chaka Demus, Majek Fashek, Blackky, Blackface, Tuface, and Marvelous Benjy as his key musical influences. Patoranking has described his music as a morally inclined variation of dancehall, and said it references socio-political issues.

On 12 September 2013, Patoranking released the Timaya-assisted single "Alubarika", which translates to "God's Blessings". The singer described the song as a summary of his life, and said it opened doors for him in terms of building a fanbase and working with established acts. The music video for "Alubarika" was filmed by AJE Filmworks and ran for 4 minutes and 16 seconds.

=== 2014–present: "Girlie O", "Murda", and "My Woman, My Everything" ===
In February 2014, Patoranking signed a record deal with Foston Musik and ended his affiliation with Dem Mama Records. While speaking with Toolz on NdaniTV's The Juice, Timaya said the singer left his label and was never officially signed. That same month, Patoranking released the track "Girlie O", which was produced by WizzyPro. The accompanying music video for the song was filmed in London by Moe Musa and released on 5 February 2014. In the video, Patoranking liberates his next-door neighbor from domestic violence by expressing his innate feelings to her. On 19 May 2014, Foston Musik released the remix of "Girlie O", which features vocals by Tiwa Savage and debuted at number 9 on MTV Base's Official Naija Top 10 chart. Savage told MTV Base's Ehiz that she admires Patoranking's music and decided to reach out to him to record the track. The music video for "Girlie O" (Remix) was also filmed by Moe Musa in London. Joey Akan of Pulse Nigeria commended the lyrics and chorus, and said the track's "basic winning elements were not discarded".

Patoranking was featured on Seyi Shay's single "Murda", alongside Shaydee. The song was produced by Dokta Frabz and released on 1 April 2014. The following month, the Meji Alabi-directed music video for "Murda" was uploaded to Vevo. Patoranking released the Wande Coal-assisted single "My Woman, My Everything" on 10 June 2015. The song's music video was directed by Mose Musa and released on 12 June 2015. It received a nomination for Best Reggae/Dancehall Video at the 2015 Nigerian Music Video Awards. The tracks "Daniella Whine" and "My Woman, My Everything" charted on MTV Base's Official Naija Top 10 chart. The former topped the chart in June, while the latter peaked at number 2.

== Personal life ==
Patoranking has two daughters. His second studio album, Wilmer, was named after his first daughter. Patoranking featured her on the album's cover art and dedicated the title track to her. The singer previously dated Ghanaian actress Joselyn Dumas and was reportedly linked to singer Yemi Alade, who played his love interest in the music video for the Flavour-assisted single "Mon Bebe".

== Discography ==
Studio albums

- God Over Everything (2016)
- Wilmer (2019)
- Three (2020)
- World Best (2023)

== Awards and nominations ==
| Year | Event | Prize | Recipient | Result | Ref |
|---|---|---|---|---|---|
| 2021 | Net Honours | Most played street hop song | "Abule" | Nominated | |
| | Vodafone Ghana Music Awards | Best African Collaboration | "My Girl Remix" by Toofan, Patoranking and Sarkodie | Nominated | |
| 2019 | Headies | Best Video | "Confirm" featuring Davido | Nominated | |
| 2018 | Vodafone Ghana Music Awards | Best Collaboration | "Sing My Name" by MzVee & Patoranking | Nominated | |
| 2018 | Vodafone Ghana Music Awards | Best Collaboration | "Na Wash" by Becca and Patoranking | Nominated | |
| 2018 | Soundcity MVP Awards | Best Video | "Heal Da World" | Won | |
| 2018 | Soundcity MVP Awards | Viewers Choice | "Available" | Won | |
| 2018 | Headies | Best Reggae Dancehall Single | "Love You Die" featuring Diamond Platnumz | Nominated | |
| 2018 | Nigerian Entertainment Awards | Best Alternative Artist | Himself | Nominated | |
| 2018 | AFRIMA | Best Collaboration | Particula | Nominated | |
| 2018 | AFRIMA | Song of the year | Particula | Nominated | |
| 2018 | AFRIMA | Best African Dancehall/Reggae Act | Himself | Nominated | |
| 2017 | AFRIMA | Best Music Video | Himself | Nominated | |
| | 4Syte Music Video Awards | Best African Music Video | My Girl by Toofan featuring Patoranking | Won | |
| 2016 | AFRIMA | Best Dancehall Artist | Himself | Won | |
| 2015 | AFRIMA | Best Dancehall Artist | Himself | Nominated | |
| 2015 | Vodafone Ghana Music Awards | African Artiste of the Year | Himself | Won | |
| 2015 | 4Syte TV Music Video Awards | Best African Act Video | "My Woman My Everything" (featuring Wande Coal) | Nominated | |
| 2015 | The Headies | Best Pop Single | "My Woman My Everything" (featuring Wande Coal) | Nominated | |
| 2015 | The Headies | Best Reggae/Dance hall Single | "Daniella Whyne" | Nominated | |
| 2015 | MTV Africa Music Awards | Best New Act | Himself | Won | |
| 2015 | TooXlusive Online Music Awards | Best Afropop Song | "My Woman My Everything" | Won | |
| 2014 | Ben TV | Best New Act | Himself | Won | |
| 2014 | Ben TV | Best Collaboration | Himself | Won | |
| 2014 | Ben TV | Best Reggae/Dancehall | Himself | Won | |
| 2014 | The Headies 2014 | Next Rated | Himself | Won | |
| 2014 | The Headies 2014 | Best Collabo | "Girlie O Remix" (featuring Tiwa Savage) | Nominated | |
| 2014 | The Headies 2014 | Best Collabo | "Emergency" (Wizz Pro featuring Skales, Patoranking and Runtown) | Won | |
| 2014 | The Headies 2014 | Best Reggae/Dancehall Single | "Girlie O Remix" (featuring Tiwa Savage) | Won | |
| 2014 | The Headies 2014 | Best Reggae/Dancehall Single | "Murda" (Seyi Shay featuring Shaydee and Patoranking) | Nominated | |
| 2014 | 2014 Channel O Music Video Awards | Most Gifted Newcomer | "Girlie O (Remix)" | Nominated | |
| 2014 | 2014 Channel O Music Video Awards | Most Gifted Ragga Dancehall | "Girlie O (Remix)" | Nominated | |
| 2014 | City People Entertainment Awards | Dancehall/Reggae Act of the Year | Himself | Won | |
| 2014 | City People Entertainment Awards | Most Popular Song of the Year | "Allubarika" (featuring Timaya) | Nominated | |
| 2014 | City People Entertainment Awards | Best Collabo of the Year | "Allubarika" (featuring Timaya) | Nominated | |
| 2014 | 2014 Nigeria Entertainment Awards | Best New Act of the Year | Himself | Won | |
| 2014 | 2014 Nigeria Entertainment Awards | Male Artist of the Year | Himself | Nominated | |
| 2014 | 2014 Nigeria Entertainment Awards | Best Collaboration | "Emergency" (Wizzy Pro featuring Runtown, Skales, and Patoranking) | Nominated | |
| 2014 | 2014 Nigeria Entertainment Awards | Best Collaboration | "Alubarika" (featuring Timaya) | Nominated | |
| 2013 | Nigeria Music Video Awards | Best Dance Hall/Reggae Video | "Alubarika" (featuring Timaya) | Nominated | |

== See also ==
- List of Nigerian musicians
- List of Igbo people
- List of people from Ebonyi State

Awards and achievements
| Preceded by Sean Tizzle (2013) | Next Rated Award; 2014 | Succeeded by (2015) |
