= DJ Breezy =

Ghanaian DJ & songwriter (born 1990)

- Born: Patrick Sika-Nartey; April 12, 1990 (age 36); Tema, Ghana
- Origin: Tema, Ghana
- Genres: Afro pop; Hip hop; Afrobeats
- Occupations: Record producer, songwriter, sound engineer
- Years active: 2008–present
- Label: Black Avenue Muzik Sonic Grind Records
- Website: www.djbreezygh.com

DJ Breezy is a Ghanaian DJ, songwriter, record producer and audio engineer. He was nominated in the "Producer of The Year" category at the 2015 All Africa Music Awards and won "Producer of The Year" at the 2015 Ghana Music Awards. Dj Breezy owns Sonic Grind Records a record label & production firm. Dj Breezy is managed by George Agyare Junior (Salty)

== Early life and education ==
DJ Breezy got his basic education at St. Michael Basic School. He further studied Music and Arts at the University of Ghana.

== Career ==
DJ Breezy started production of music as a child, began professional music production in 2008, and came into the limelight after being signed by Black Avenue Musik Group in 2012.

DJ Breezy has been credited for producing songs like "Tonga" by Joey B, "Personal Person" and "Shiehor" by Dblack ft Castro, and "Seihor" by Castro ft DBlack.

== Selected production credits ==
- Seihor Dblack ft. Castro
- Personal Person by Dblack ft. Castro
- Tonga by Joey B
- Selfie by V.VIP
- My Dollars by Mc Galaxy
- Rise My Gun by Shatta Wale
- Forget Me Not by D-Black ft. Bisa Kdei
- Believe by M.anifest ft. Mugeez x Kwesta
- Inside by Maccasio ft. Zeal
- Inna Mi Party by Shatta Wale ft D-Black
- Shelele by E.L
- Benedicta by Joey B
- Joy Daddy by Criss Waddle ft Joey B
- DeDeeDe by Kontihene ft Yaa Pono
- Washing Bay by E.L
- Budum Budum by Vybrant Faya
- GoGaga by MC Galaxy Ft. Cynthia Morgan & DJ Jimmy Jatt

=== Accolades ===
Year	Event	Prize	Recipient	Result	Ref
2015	All Africa Music Awards	Producer of the Year	Himself	Won	
2015	Vodafone Ghana Music Awards	Producer of the Year	Himself	Won	
2017	All Africa Music Awards	Producer of the Year	Himself	Nominated	\
2018	Ghana Naija Showbiz Awards	Producer of the Year	Himself	Nominated	
