= Dr Cryme =

Ghanaian rapper

- Also known as: Da General
- Born: Darlington Agyekum; 1986 (age 39–40); Tema, Ghana
- Origin: Tema, Ghana
- Genres: Afropop, hiplife
- Occupations: Rapper, singer
- Years active: 2009–present
- Label: Twipop Records

Dr Cryme is the stage name of Darlington Agyekum, a Ghanaian rapper and early proponent of the Ghanaian "twipop" genre. Dr Cryme has also performed as a TV presenter, a brand ambassador and is CEO of Twipop Recordz.

Agyekum was born in Tema and began making music in his early school days. He studied at the Datus School and then attended ASUTECH in Cape Coast and Sotech in Somanya before earning a certificate in broadcast journalism from the Ghana Institute of Journalism.His right hand man is Nelly Bentley White

== Life and music career ==
Agyekum's stage name Dr. Cryme is an acronym which means Doctor (of the) Creative Rhymes You Most Enjoy. Whilst in high school, Agyekum gained himself underground popularity through "Kasahare Level"; a popular rap competition on Adom FM (an Accra based radio station) which featured Sarkodie, Stay Jay and the like. It was through these rap battles and his style of music which caught the eye of the Ejams record label to sign him in 2010. He released his first hit single "Kill me shy" the same year. In 2011, he released his debut album called "Finally Finally". In 2012, his "Kill me shy" emerged the song "Hip life song of the year" at the Ghana Music Awards. He was also nominated for the "Song Writer of the year", "Most Popular Song of the Year", and "Hip life/Hip Hop Artiste of the Year" categories. Agyekum released his sophomore album entitled Showtime in February 2018. The twenty tracked album includes the hit single "Koko Sakora" which features Sarkodie.

== Business career and endorsements ==
Dr. Cryme performed as a presenter for 4 syte TV in 2011. He hosted the ‘Top 10 Videos’ which was aired on ETV Ghana. In the same year, Agyekum was officially unveiled as the Brand Ambassador for Samsung Ghana.

Agyekum was involved in the UN Volunteers Day Chokor project which was pegged to the Copenhagen conference.

== Awards and nominations ==
=== Ghana Music Awards UK ===
Year	Nominee / work	Award	Result
2016	Himself	Afrobeat Artist Of The Year	Nominated
2016	Koko Sakora ft Sarkodie	Best Collaboration Of The Year	Nominated

=== Ghana Music Awards ===
Year	Nominee / work	Award	Result
2012	Himself	Best New Artist	Nominated
2012	Himself	Hip hop/Hip Life artist of the year	Nominated
2012	Himself	Songwriter of the year	Nominated
2012	Kill Me Shy	Most Popular Song Of The Year	Nominated
2012	Kill Me Shy	Hiplife Song Of The Year"	Won

=== 4syte Music Video Awards ===
Year	Nominee / work	Award	Result
2016	Koko Sakora ft Sarkodie	Best Collaboration Video	Nominated
2016	Koko Sakora ft Sarkodie	Best Hiplife Video	Won
2016	Koko Sakora ft Sarkodie	Most Popular Video	Nominated
2016	Koko Sakora ft Sarkodie	Best Photography Video	Nominated
2016	Rise	Best Hip Hop Video	Nominated
2011	Kill Me Shy	Best Hip Life Video	Nominated
2011	Kill Me Shy	Best Male Video	Nominated
2011	Himself	Discovery of the Year	Nominated

=== Golden Heart Awards ===
Year	Nominee / work	Award	Result
2011	Himself	Most Influential Artist	Won

=== High School Honours ===
Year	Nominee / work	Award	Result
2011	Himself	Most Influential Artist	Won

=== Ashaiman Music Awards ===
Year	Nominee / work	Award	Result
2019	Himself	Best Mainstream Act	Won

== Discography ==
=== Albums ===
- Finally Finally (2012)
- Showtime
- Unexpected
