= Future Africa Leaders Award =

Annual youth prize

The Future Africa Leaders Award
- Awarded for: Distinguished Developmental Project and Exemplary Leadership
- Sponsored by: Chris Oyakhilome Foundation International
- Presented by: Chris Oyakhilome
- Reward: $25,000 Star Prize winner $10,000 for each winner
- First award: 2013
- Final award: 2022
- Website: futureafricaleaderfoundation.org

Television/radio coverage
- Directed by: Adeola Phillips

The Future Africa Leaders Award (FALA) is an annual prize awarded to 10 African youths who have contributed significantly in their local communities through innovation, societal education on local and global issues, developing solutions to combat societal issues, advocacy, social education and societal awareness. Each winner is given a grant of US$10,000 and an outstanding winner among the 10 is given an additional US$25,000. Since inception, 110 youths from 28 countries have won this Award out of thousands of entries reviewed each year.

Each year, the Award holds 31 December into the New Year with all recipients in attendance physically in Nigeria. Since 2018, the ceremony has been chaired by Former Nigerian President Olusegun Obasanjo, with keynote speakers such as Madame President Ellen Johnson Sirleaf of Liberia, President Goodluck Jonathan of Nigeria, Dr. Arikana Chihombori-Quao, Solomon Dalung and Nobel Peace Laureate Leymah Roberta Gbowee in attendance.

Since inception, $1.35 million of grant has been given to 110 recipients from 28 African countries.

In 2023, the Future Africa Leaders Foundation donated 500 million naira to the development of the Olusegun Obasanjo Presidential Library in Ogun State, Nigeria.

== Background ==
The Future Africa Leaders Award was established in 2013 and is organized every year by the Future Africa Leaders Foundation, a sub-organization of the Chris Oyakhilome Foundation International (COFI). The Award recognizes the role of young leaders as drivers of progress and development in Africa, and therefore only youths in Africa between the ages of 16 - 23 qualify as recipients. The selection process commences within the year where entries are submitted on the Foundation's official website, after which a review and verification process is initiated till a final list of 30 is shortlisted and presented.

It is awarded to 10 youths each year across Africa between the ages of 16 - 23 by the patron of the foundation and host of the Award ceremony, Pastor Chris Oyakhilome.

== Star Prize Winners ==
Among the ten winners each year who receive $10,000, a star prize winner emerges from them receiving an additional $25,000. Below are a list of the star prize winners each year:

NAME	COUNTRY	YEAR	PROJECTS
Ajide Sharon	Nigeria	2013	
Salapei Lotan	Kenya	2014	Salapei raised awareness in Kenya about Female Genital Mutilation, a practice considered a violation of human rights. During the international Day of Zero Tolerance for female Genital Mutilation in Kenya, Salapei gave educational talks and met and supported affected persons. Besides this, he provided solar lamps to students in a primary school in Kenya.
Sakala Rose	Malawi	2015	Founded a youth group with centers across 6 Universities in Malawi collaborating with organizations to assist over 5,000 youths and women achieve their potentially viable ideas. tackle issues facing their demography. educate and empower them to live more fulfilled
Musodza Karen	South Africa	2016	Led several Youth Against Crime initiatives, organizing transformational seminars to fight crime in collaboration with the Police and other civil institutions. She impacted several thousands of youths in South Africa, earning a commendation from the Police.
Ekpoki Naomi	Nigeria	2017	At 15, she founded the Senema Love Foundation which has focused on providing education and skills acquisition to over 1700 youths.
Isaiah Deng	South Sudan	2018	Contributing to national development as respite to the long civil war in South Sudan, Isaiah Deng developed a program called, 'Acquire Skills for your Future' where he taught computer skills and inspired thousands of youth on the power of sustainable development and nation building
Babienne Heline Eweni	Cameroon	2019	
Wawa Gwei Michael	Cameroon	2020	He founded an NGO ‘Youth Empowerment through Science and Technology’ (YEST) which carried out numerous conferences and seminars, impacting thousands of youths in Cameroon. In collaboration with other institutions, he organized a technological trade fair which showcased over 15 new inventions, and a Teck Community Challenge.
Nervis Nzomethiah	Cameroon	2021	He built a tech community called Nervtek.
Lebsey Petmia Lebaga	Cameroon	2022	Lebsey Lebaga has impacted over 8000 young people in Cameroon through various conferences and seminars.
