= Nana Kwame Bediako =

Ghanaian real estate entrepreneur

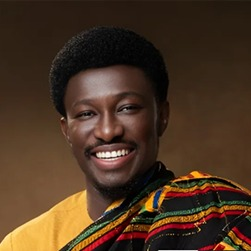
- Presidential candidate
- Born: Nana Kwame Bediako; February 13, 1980 (age 46); Asokwa, Ashanti Region
- Other name: Freedom Jacob Caesar
- Education: Apam Senior High School; Accra Academy; Waltham Forest College; University of Westminster
- Occupations: Industrialist, Political leader, Real estate developer
- Years active: 2000–present
- Known for: Founder of The New Force, Kwarleyz Group, Philanthropy
- Spouse: Ruby Garshong

Nana Kwame Bediako (born February 13, 1980), also known as Freedom Jacob Caesar, is a Ghanaian entrepreneur and real estate developer. He is known for his business ventures in real estate and philanthropy. He is the founder and chairman of the Kwarleyz Group, a real estate company. Bediako is the developer of Wonda World and the proposed Petronia City. He is the founder of New Africa Foundation, a non-profit focused on social and economic challenges in Africa. In 2024, Bediako founded and led the New Force Movement and contested the Ghanaian general elections. At age 44, he became one of the youngest presidential candidates in Ghana's Fourth Republic and placed third out of thirteen candidates on the ballot.

Bediako attended Waltham Forest College in England, where he engaged in small-scale trading, including selling clothes and shoes from the boot of his car. He later ventured into the scrap business, which subsequently led to involvement in the steel industry, telecommunications, and real estate development.

== Early life and education ==
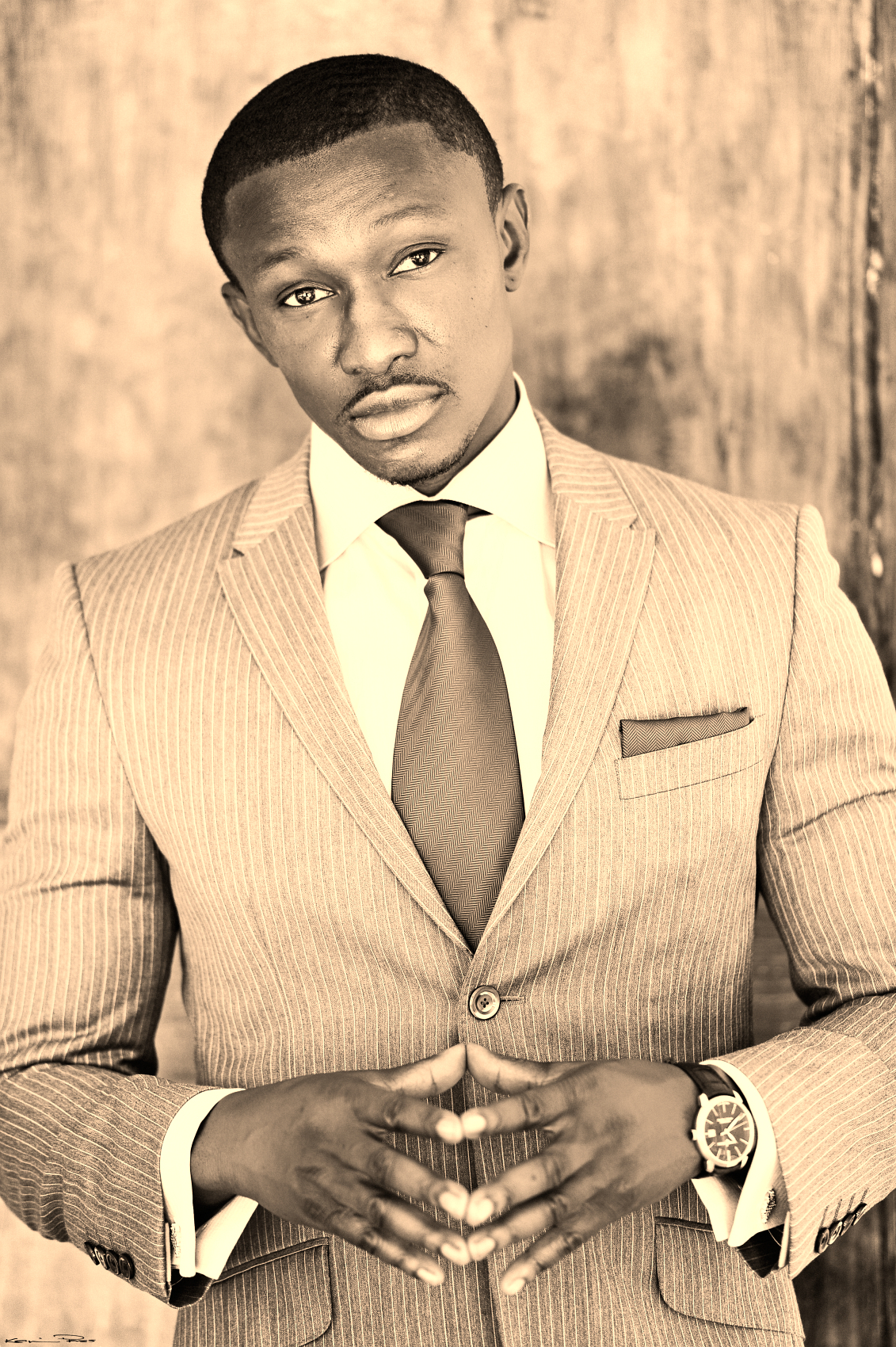
NKB in 2010

Nana Kwame Bediako was born in Ghana on February 13, 1980. He began being an entrepreneur at a young age by establishing a small poultry farm. He attended Apam Senior High School and Accra Academy for his secondary education before moving to the United Kingdom to study business at Waltham Forest College and later at the University of Westminster.

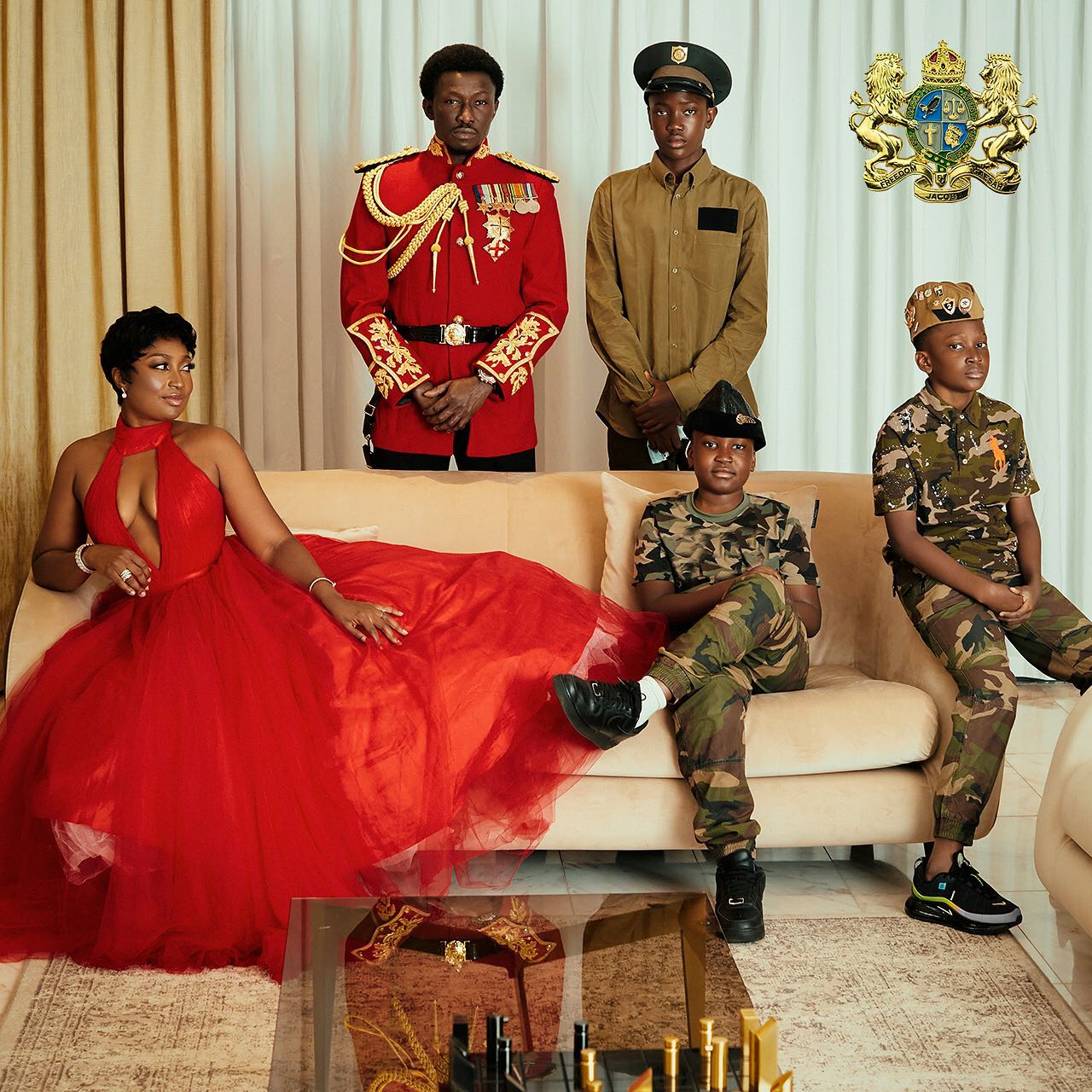

Bediako is the son of Elizabeth Adjei, a philanthropist, and Samuel Kojo Bediako, a commodities trader and businessman involved in the oil industry. He is married to Ruby Garshong Bediako, and the couple has four children.

== Business career ==
=== Kwarleyz Group ===
Bediako is the founder of the Kwarleyz Group, a conglomerate with business interests in real estate, construction, energy, hospitality, and philanthropic initiatives.

=== Wonda World ===
Bediako is also the founder of Wonda World, a real estate development company. The company has developed properties including No. 1 Oxford Street, Kwarleyz Residences, and Bel Air Crest.

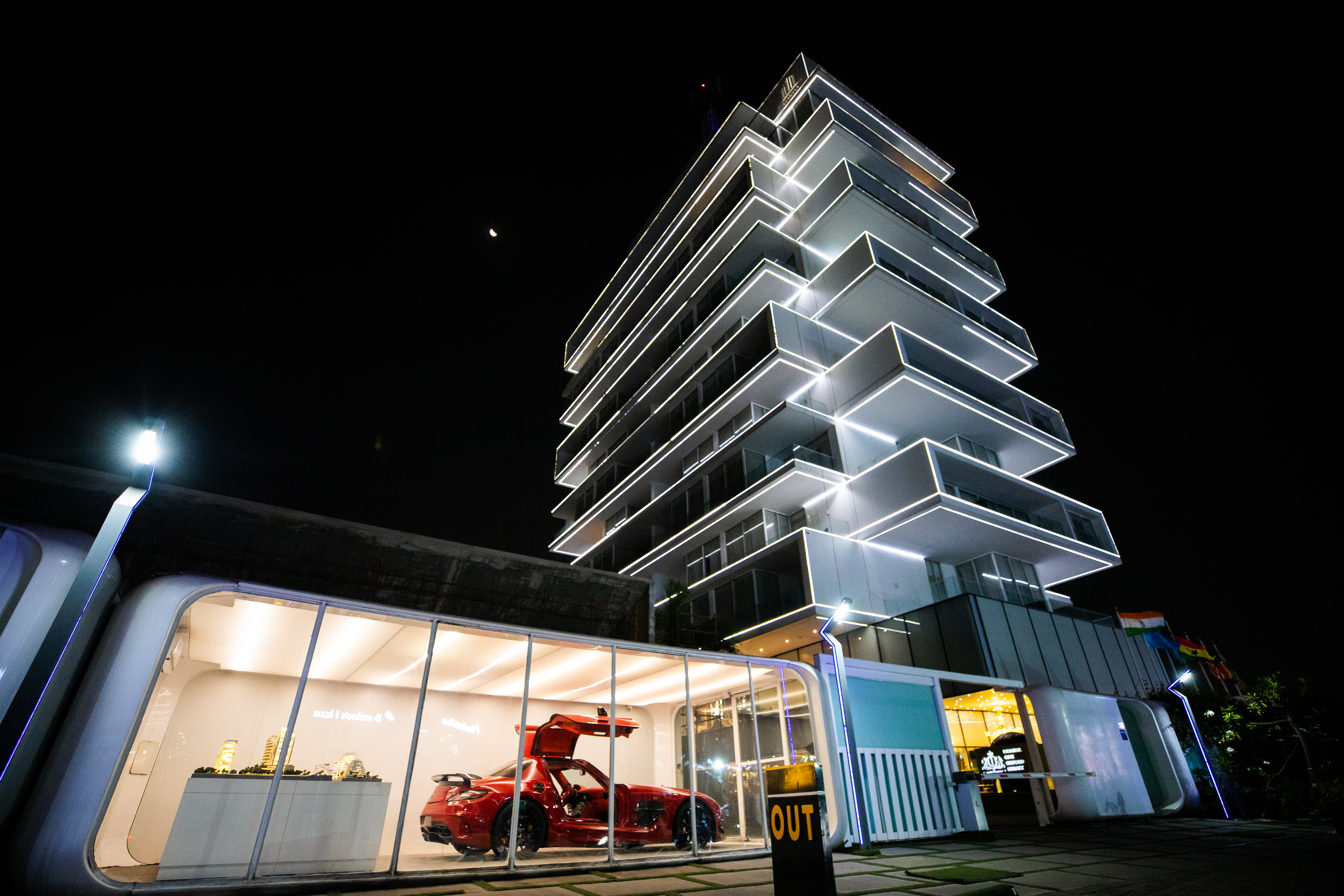
No. 1 Oxford Street

The company is involved in commercial, residential, and hospitality projects, as well as proposed national developments such as a zoo and museum.

=== Petronia City ===
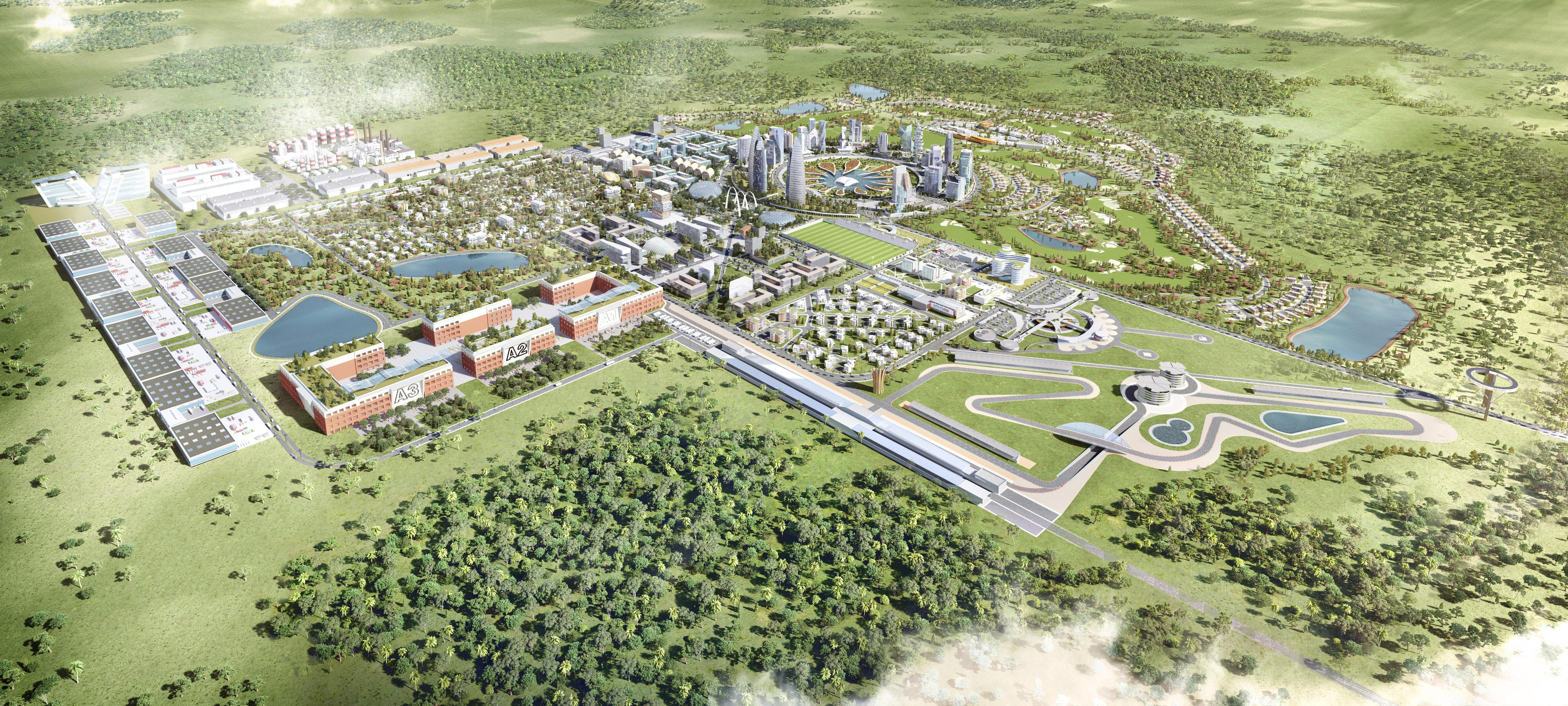
An overview of Petronia City_Western Region

Bediako is the founder of Petronia City, a proposed 2,000-acre industrial development in Ghana's Western Region. The project is intended to serve as a hub for energy, petrochemical, and technology industries within a free zone enclave. Initially announced in 2013, Petronia City has faced various funding and regulatory hurdles. However, Bediako has continued to advocate for its realization as part of a broader plan described as a "16-Region Industrial Revolution" linked to his New Force political movement.

=== New Africa Foundation ===
Bediako is the founder of the New Africa Foundation, a philanthropic organization that supports various humanitarian initiatives across Africa. Co-managed with his mother, the foundation has been involved in projects aimed at community development, healthcare assistance, and social support.

Notable initiatives include providing housing for 95-year-old World War II veteran Private Joseph Hammond, arranging emergency medical evacuation and treatment for a child with cancer from Ghana's Upper West Region, and funding separation surgery for conjoined twins Elijah and Elisha.

In 2023, following the Turkey–Syria earthquake, the foundation organized aid efforts including the construction of a temporary shelter settlement. It also provided relief to flood victims in Mepe after the Akosombo Dam spillage. The foundation has supported individuals with disabilities by helping them establish small businesses, and distributed food to approximately 5,000 people during the COVID-19 pandemic. Bediako has also participated in advocacy against racial injustice, organizing rallies and awareness efforts globally.

== Political career ==
=== New Force Movement ===
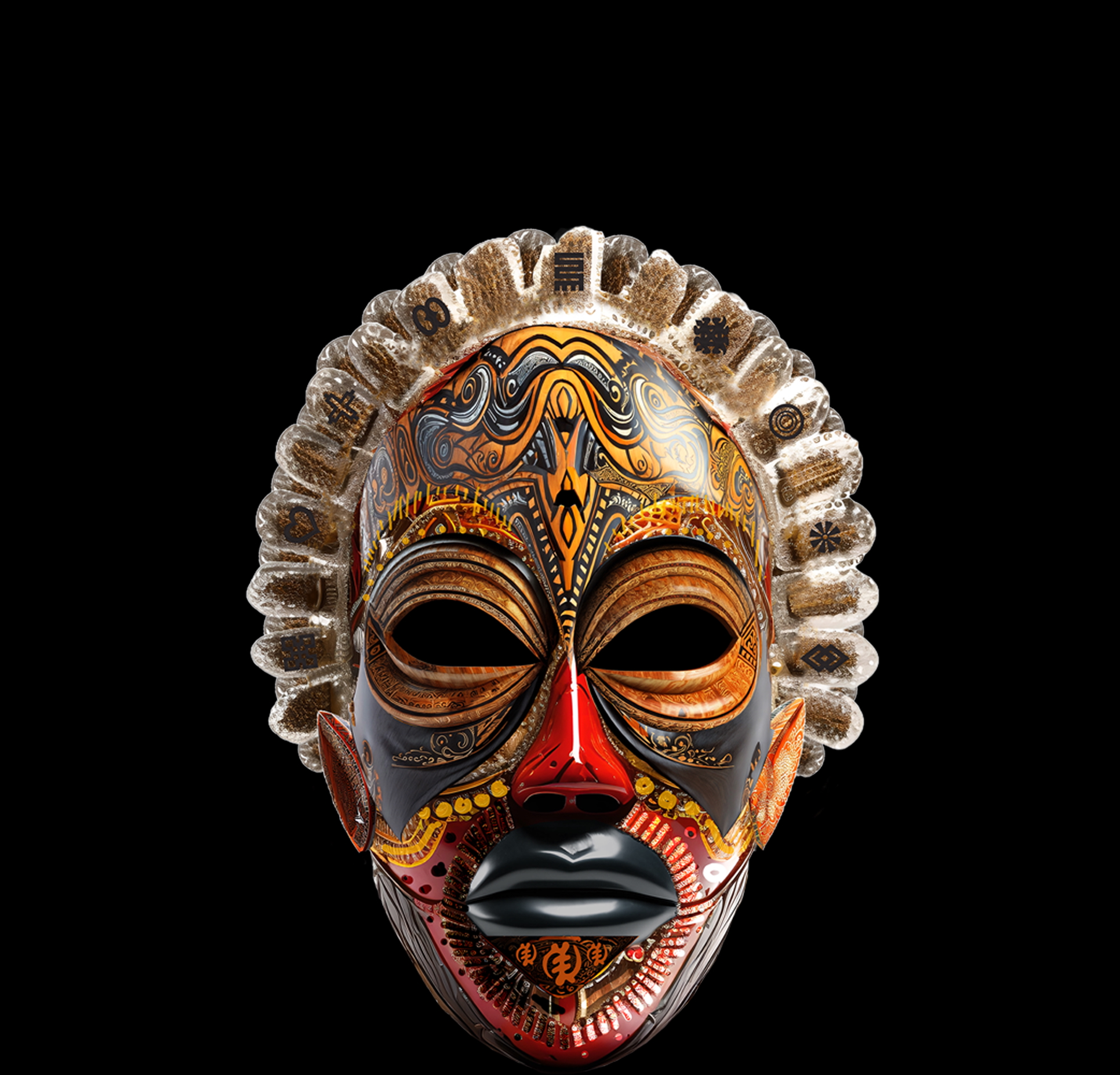
2023 Official logo

In 2023, Bediako established the New Force, a political movement in Ghana. The movement gained public attention through a national billboard campaign that featured a masked figure, which led to speculation prior to Bediako identifying himself as the individual behind the campaign.

=== Spokesperson appointment ===
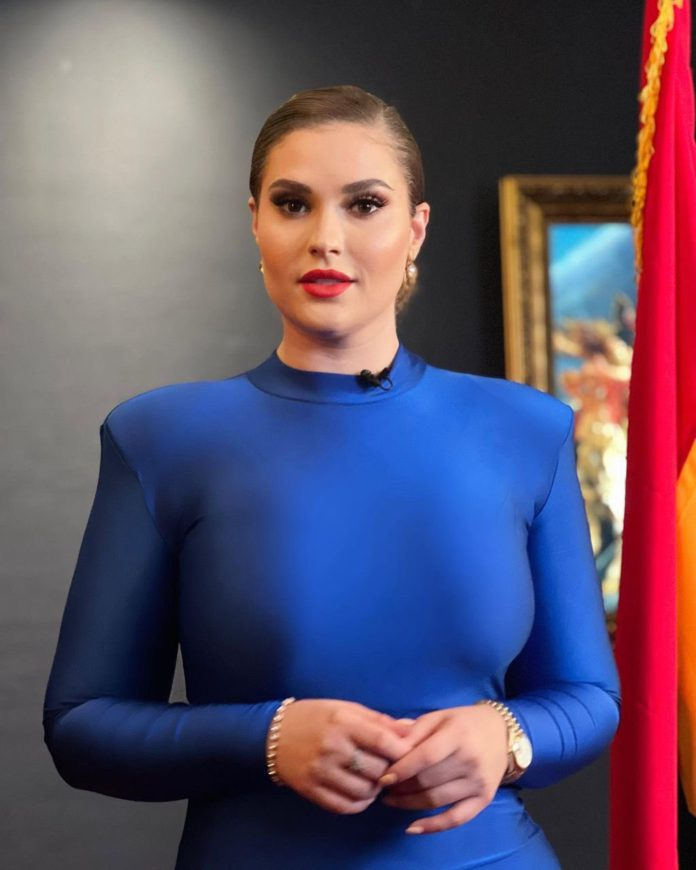
Shalimar's first appearance

The New Force drew media attention when Shalimar Abbiusi, a Belgian national, was announced as its spokesperson. According to media reports, she volunteered for the role after some individuals reportedly declined to represent the movement publicly. Her appointment led to public discussion regarding the involvement of foreign nationals in Ghanaian political activities.

Arrest and legal proceedings

In 2023, Shalimar Abbiusi, spokesperson for The New Force, was arrested by the Ghana Immigration Service (GIS) and charged with allegedly falsifying her residence permit. Although the case was later dropped, she was reportedly re-arrested at the court premises by personnel from the military, immigration, and National Intelligence Bureau (NIB), and subsequently deported. Bediako later brought the case before the ECOWAS Court of Justice, claiming the deportation violated her human rights. The court ruled in favor of the complainant, prompting discussions in Ghanaian media and legal circles. Some commentators noted the case as a significant precedent involving international human rights law and Ghanaian political activism.

The Convention event

On January 7, 2024, Bediako, in collaboration with the New Africa Foundation, organized an event titled The Convention. The gathering was intended as a pan-African forum, scheduled to take place at Accra's Black Star Square, a historically significant site where Ghana's independence was declared by Dr. Kwame Nkrumah.

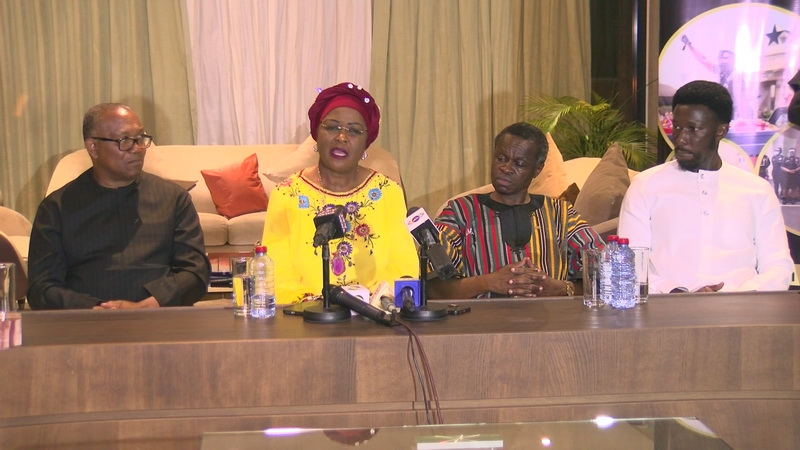

Promoted as a platform to discuss Africa's future and continental unity, the event aimed to bring together influential figures from various regions of the continent. Among the scheduled speakers were Professor P. L. O. Lumumba of Kenya, known for his advocacy of Pan-Africanism; Dr. Arikana Chihombori-Quao of Zimbabwe, a former African Union representative to the United States; Julius Malema of South Africa, leader of the Economic Freedom Fighters; and Peter Obi of Nigeria, a former governor and 2023 presidential candidate.

Cancellation of the event

The Office of the President cancelled the event shortly before it was scheduled to take place. Following the cancellation, military personnel and national security forces were deployed to the venue, helicopters were observed over Independence Square, and access to the area was restricted. The sudden cancellation drew significant public and media attention, with reactions reported both domestically and internationally.

Media coverage and public reception

The New Force movement and its founder, Bediako, received international media attention following the unveiling of his identity. The Financial Times, The Guardian, and The Africa Report reported on the political developments and growing interest in the movement across Africa. Media coverage extended beyond Ghana, with reports appearing in European outlets, including publications in Italy, Belgium, and Spain. Coverage in over 30 African countries focused on themes of political change and civil response to the movement. Within 48 hours of the media attention, Bediako publicly identified himself as the figure behind the New Force campaign.

== Campaign ==
In preparation for the 2024 presidential election, Bediako launched a national listening tour across all sixteen regions of Ghana. According to the New Force movement, the aim of the tour was to engage directly with citizens, identify regional challenges, and assess socio-economic conditions. The tour also gathered data on the natural and mineral resources in each region.

The New Force later stated that the tour revealed significant regional disparities in development, with Accra identified as the only region experiencing consistent economic activity. The movement attributed high levels of unemployment in other regions to this imbalance.

Bediako initially sought to register the New Force as a political party with the Electoral Commission of Ghana. He claimed that despite submitting the required documentation, the registration process faced delays. After reportedly waiting eight months and receiving only a provisional license, Bediako announced his decision to run as an independent candidate in the 2024 presidential election.

Democratic process concerns

In 2024, Bediako criticized the Electoral Commission of Ghana for what he described as an inadequate voter registration period. At a press conference in Accra, he stated that the 20-day window for registering new voters was insufficient and noted that the timing overlapped with examinations for many 18-year-olds eligible to vote for the first time. He called for an extension of the registration period and raised concerns about voter access. Bediako also responded publicly to media figures, including journalist Kwame Sefa Kayi, who initially disputed his concerns. A representative from the Electoral Commission later confirmed that the registration period was limited, which Bediako cited as a validation of his claims.

12 pillars policy framework

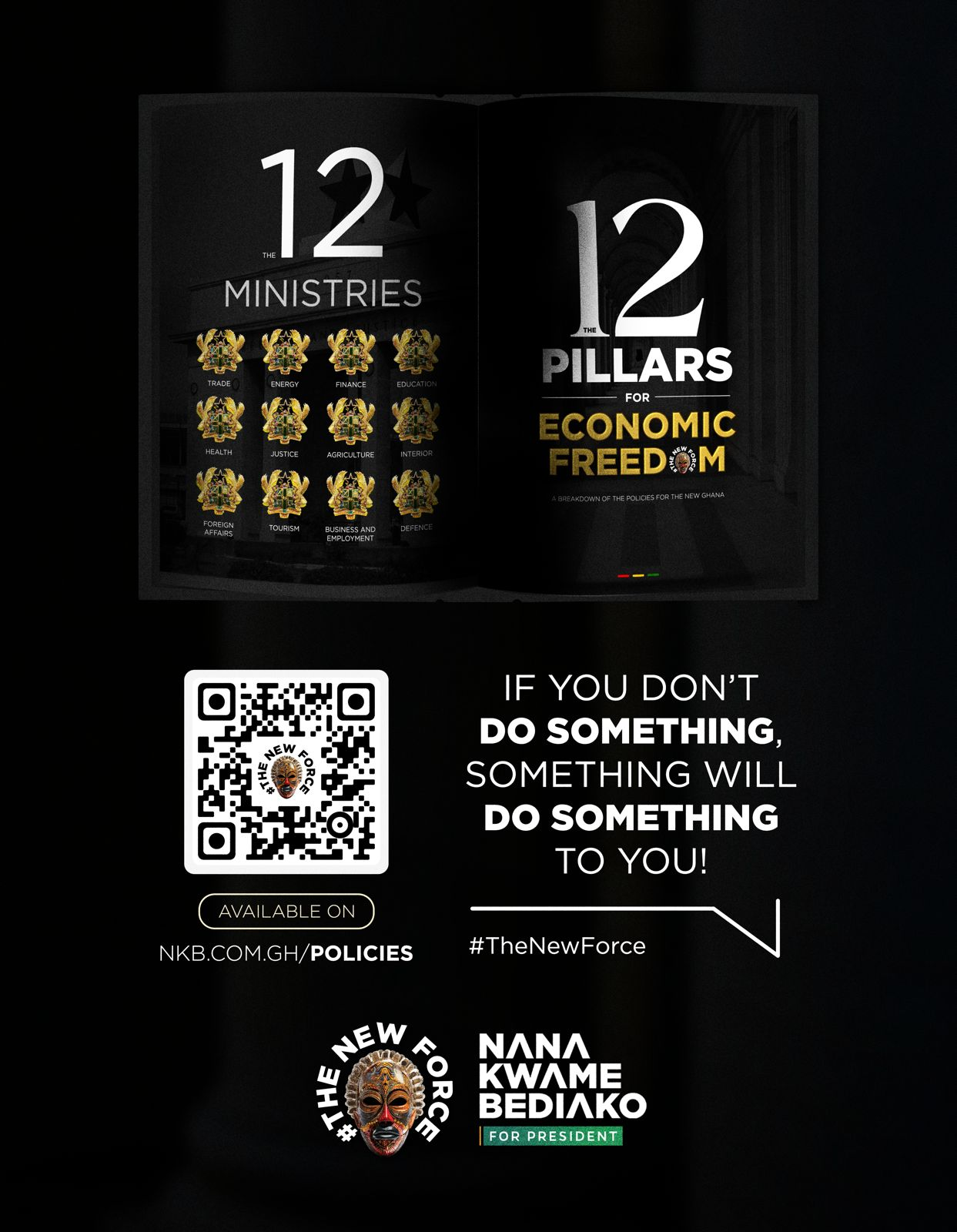
12 Pillars for Economic Freedom

In early 2024, Bediako launched a policy framework titled "The 12 Pillars for Economic Freedom", which he presented virtually—reportedly the first such launch of its kind in Ghana. The framework focused on areas such as infrastructure, agriculture, job creation, and governance reforms. According to statements from Bediako and the New Force, the policy was informed by research into Ghana's mineral resources and agricultural potential, which they claimed could generate significant economic returns and employment opportunities. The launch included symbolic gestures, such as Bediako arriving on stage in a truck to signify his intent to work for the people. The New Force claimed that some elements of the 12 Pillars were later echoed by other political leaders across Africa. These claims have not been independently confirmed in reliable sources and remain attributed to the movement itself.

276 constituency tour Following the policy launch, Bediako initiated a national campaign tour across all 276 constituencies in Ghana. According to media reports and New Force statements, the tour aimed to engage grassroots communities, introduce policy proposals, and address local development challenges.

As part of the tour, Bediako undertook several philanthropic activities, including the installation of boreholes to improve access to clean water, the distribution of agricultural tools, and the establishment of community farms focused on avocados, oranges, guinea fowl, and fish. These initiatives were positioned by the movement as efforts to combat unemployment and food insecurity.

One event during the tour involved Bediako's efforts to mediate between two traditional leaders, the Dormaahene, Osagyefo Oseadeeyo Agyeman Badu II, and the Asantehene, Otumfuo Osei Tutu II. According to local news coverage, his role was seen by some observers as contributing to dialogue between the leaders, although details of the mediation and its long-term impact remain limited.

Stance on galamsey

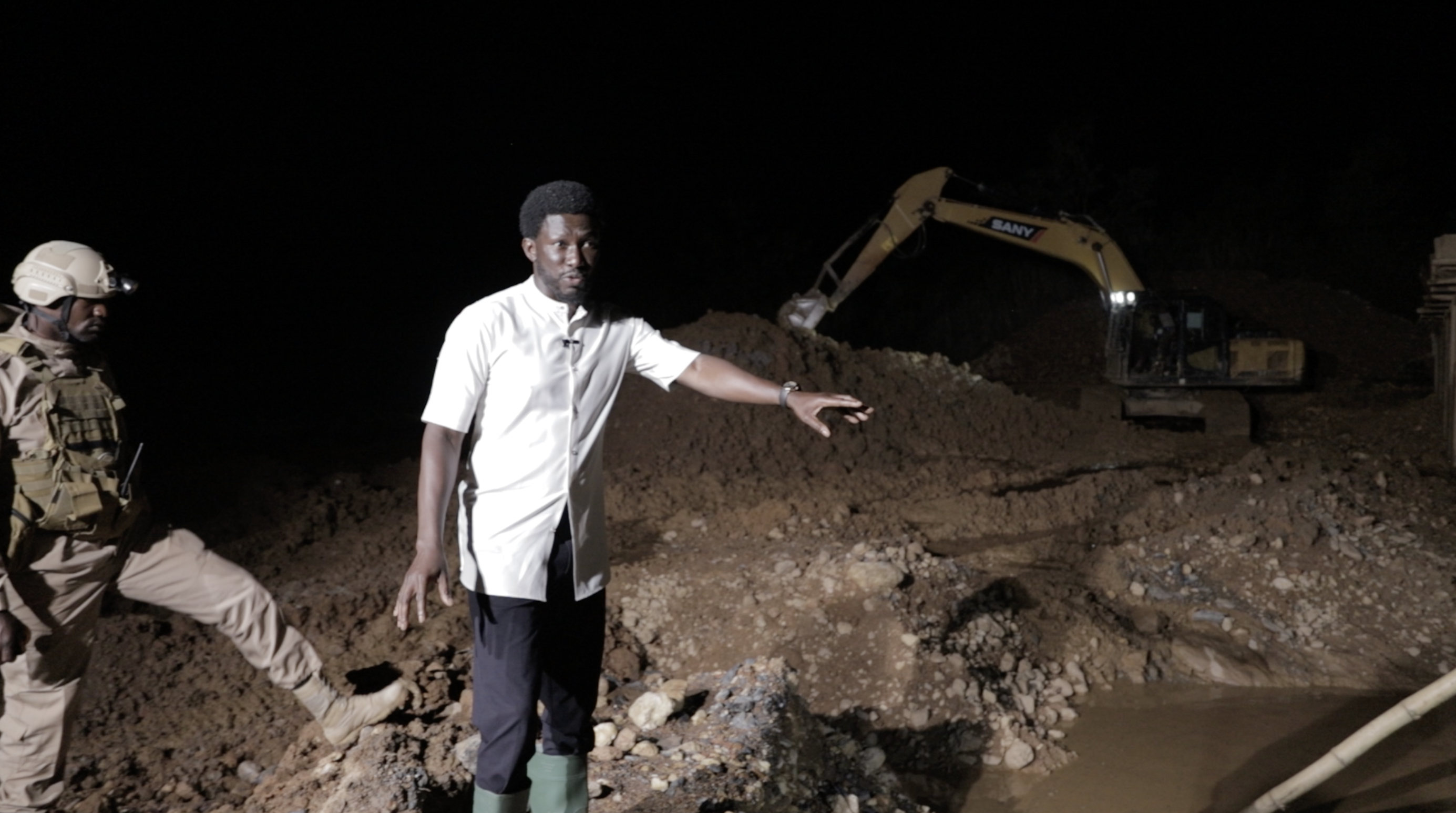
Expose at a galemsey site

Bediako has expressed concern about illegal small-scale mining in Ghana, commonly known as galamsey. In public statements, he proposed measures including detaining foreign nationals involved in illegal mining activities, and called for cooperation from foreign governments to address the issue. Ahead of the 2024 general elections, Bediako visited various mining areas to observe the environmental effects of galamsey. He later released a two-part documentary titled Dark-umentary, which explored the historical and socio-economic factors contributing to the rise of illegal mining. The film suggested that external interests and loosely organized networks have played a role in perpetuating the problem. He also released a policy document, referred to as the "Galamsey Manifesto", which outlines proposed strategies for addressing illegal mining and its associated challenges.

Around the same period, protests against galamsey were held in Accra, some of which turned violent and resulted in arrests. Bediako claimed that the protests were politically influenced, a statement that attracted both support and criticism.

Speech at the UK Parliament

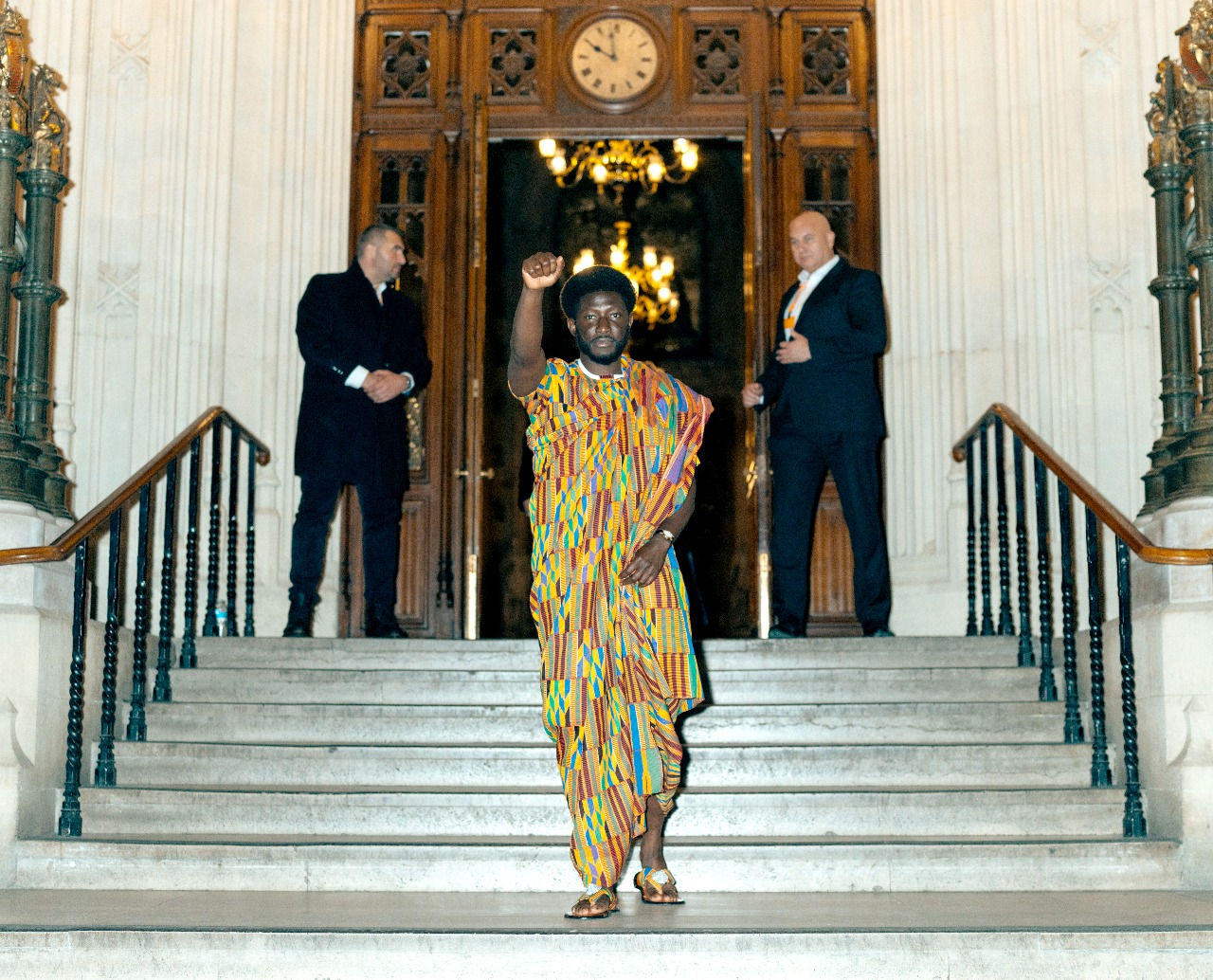

During his 2024 presidential campaign, Bediako addressed an audience at the UK Parliament, where he discussed Africa's development challenges and international relations. In his remarks, he introduced a policy proposal referred to as the "Seven Pillars," aimed at addressing economic issues across the continent. He also called for a reassessment of Africa's relationship with Western nations, emphasizing the need for more equitable economic cooperation and reduced dependence on resource extraction models.

Concerns over electoral process

During the 2024 presidential election cycle in Ghana, Bediako raised concerns about the balloting procedure used by the Electoral Commission. He questioned the decision to allow representatives of political parties to draw their positions on the ballot paper before independent candidates, suggesting that the approach could be seen as disadvantaging non-party candidates. In response, the Electoral Commission acknowledged the concerns and stated that it would review the process in future elections.

Allegations of political and media bias

Bediako and his campaign team have also cited several instances they believe reflect political bias. These include the reported refusal by the Electoral Commission to issue accreditation to some of his polling agents. Additionally, the campaign has claimed that certain media outlets have misrepresented his ideas and political messages.

Wealth and public image

Bediako's wealth and lifestyle have been the subject of media coverage in Ghana and internationally. His business ventures, including the creation of a private museum and ownership of luxury vehicles, have contributed to his public visibility. Media outlets have occasionally compared him to historical African figures such as Mansa Musa. Some supporters have drawn symbolic parallels between Bediako and Ghana's first president, Kwame Nkrumah, though these comparisons are not universally accepted.

== Controversies ==
The tigers

In 2022, Bediako attracted media attention for housing two tigers, named Kunta and Kinte, in a residential area in Ghana. He later stated that the animals were kept temporarily while a dedicated wildlife facility was being constructed. The incident prompted public debate and concern over the legality and safety of keeping wild animals in urban areas. Following public and regulatory scrutiny, the tigers were relocated to a specialized enclosure described by Bediako as a "big cat wildlife centre."

According to statements attributed to Bediako, his interest in keeping tigers stemmed from a desire to challenge perceptions about animal domestication and to promote wildlife tourism in Ghana. He expressed an ambition to breed and eventually donate the animals to other African countries, though no independent confirmation of such plans has been reported.

Freedom Coin

Bediako announced the launch of a cryptocurrency called Freedom Coin on March 6, coinciding with Ghana's Independence Day. He stated that the initiative aimed to promote African economic self-reliance and envisioned it as a gold-backed digital asset. The Bank of Ghana issued a public advisory warning the public that Freedom Coin was not recognized as legal tender and should be approached with caution. In response, Bediako criticized the central bank, citing concerns over the depreciation of the cedi.

Bringing the sea to Kumasi

In a public address, Bediako stated his intent to "bring the sea to Kumasi," which led to public discussion and media attention due to its literal interpretation. He later clarified that the comment referred to plans to enhance Ghana's waterway infrastructure by connecting inland water bodies through dredging. Experts have not publicly evaluated the technical or financial feasibility of this proposal.

Legacy and political vision

Bediako's political platform, known as The New Force, has positioned itself as a challenger to Ghana's traditional political parties. He has framed the movement as focused on generational leadership, resource sovereignty, and economic transformation. His public speeches frequently include calls for African nations to assert control over their natural resources and to rethink their global economic relationships. A recurring theme in his messaging is the aspiration for Africa to "rise" and create a future aligned with the aspirations of past generations.

== Awards and recognition ==
Bediako has several awards from organizations in Ghana and internationally.

2021:

- Ghana CEO of the Decade by CEO Network Ghana
- Social Entrepreneurship and Leadership Award from Forbes
- Won Best African Project with a Porcelanosa Product at the Porcelanosa Awards in Spain

2018:

- Rising Star Award at the Exclusive Men of the Year (EMY) Awards, Ghana.

2016:

- Lifetime Africa Achievement Award for Entrepreneurship Excellence in Africa

2015:

- Business Entrepreneur of the Year – GUBA Awards, UK
- Young Entrepreneur of the Year – Head of State Award Scheme
- Young Male Role Model of the Year – The Young Professionals and Youth Coalition
