= Chris Oyakhilome Foundation International =

Non-governmental organization

- Chris Oyakhilome Foundation International
- Abbreviation: COFI
- Formation: 2008
- Founded at: Nigeria
- Type: Nonprofit, NGO
- Legal status: Non Governmental Organisation
- Purpose: Humanitarian, Advocacy
- Location: Lagos, Nigeria
- Key people: Pastor Chris Oyakhilome
- Subsidiaries: Trauma Care International, Innercity Mission for Children, Bible For All Missions,Future Africa Leaders Foundation, Volunteer Medical Corps
- Website: cofi.online

Chris Oyakhilome Foundation International (COFI) is a faith based non-profit, non-political, philanthropy and charity non-governmental organisation founded by Pastor Chris Oyakhilome in 2008.

In 2020, the founder through COFI, donated 1 billion Naira to upgrade the Faculty of Engineering in Benson Idahosa University and by the 4th Quarter of 2022, the organisation via the Inner-City Missions for Children had completed her 12th free primary schools and health center, providing free school supplies, daily meals and 100% academic scholarship and medical services to over 2,000 indigent children in Nigeria, South Sudan and Cambodia.

COFI is aimed at eradicating poverty, providing quality education, promoting economic growth; industry, innovation and infrastructure and good health and well being primarily in Africa and other parts of the world; especially places of natural or man-made disasters.

In 2023, Chris Oyakhilome Foundation International donated 500 million naira to the continuous development of President Olusegun Obasanjo Library, in Ogun State Nigeria and also donated a twin building waiting room to the Nigerian Immigration Service.

== Interests ==
Since inception, COFI has funded initiatives directly involved in responding to natural and man-made disasters, youth empowerment and mentorship, provision of scholarship, education and welfare for indigent children, healthcare, trauma care and emergency response, community development and Bible distribution around the world, but with particular emphasis on Africa and some parts of Asia. Officially however, COFI's interests are broadly classified into 4;

2) Early Childhood Education & Development: COFI's pilot programs centered around early childhood education and development through the Inner-City Missions for Children, which began 2 years before COFI was incorporated in 2008.

3) Youth Leadership Development & Engagement: Through several initiatives, primarily, the Future Africa Leaders Award through the Future Africa Leaders Foundation, COFI has invested over $1.3 million in promoting youth empowerment and mentorship around Africa.

4) Family Strengthening & Livelihood:.

== Turkey / Syria Earthquake Intervention ==
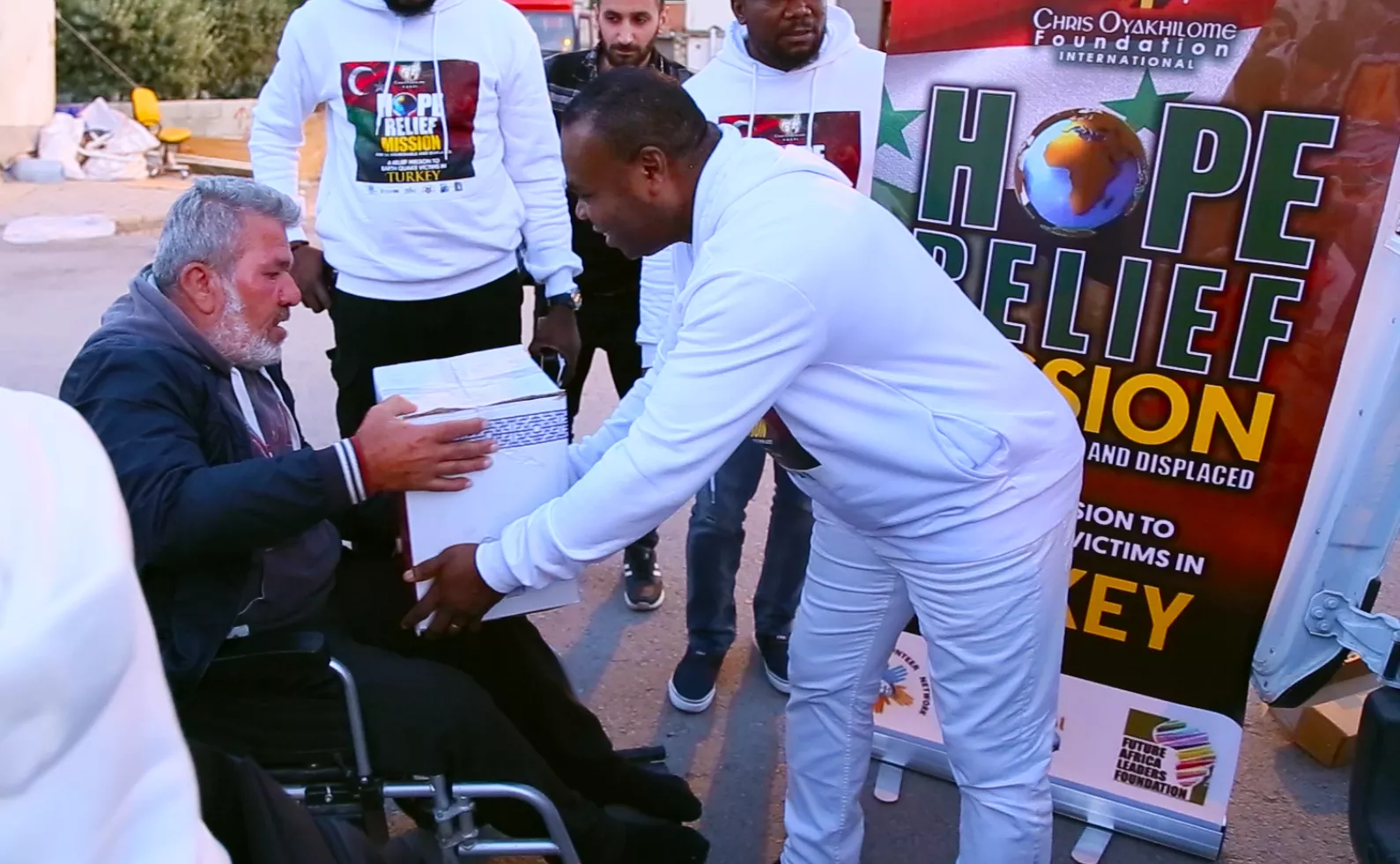
COFI Volunteers distributing Relief Items in 2023 Turkey Hope Relief Mission

In May 2023, COFI carried out a Hope Relief Mission and distributed over 5,000 boxes filled with food and supplies to survivors of the earthquake living in Adana, Kahramanmaras, Islahiye, Gaziantep, Nurdagi and Hatay IDP Camps who were badly affected by the 2023 Syria-Turkey earthquakes which occurred in February same year.
