= National Sport Festival (Edo 2020) =

Edo 2020 Sports Festival was the 20th edition of the Nigerian National Sports Festival, a biennial multi-sport event organized by the Federal Government of Nigeria through the National Sports Commission for athletes from the 36 States and the Federal Capital Territory of Nigeria.

== History ==
The National Sports Festival was first held in 1973 in Lagos State. The festival has always been celebrated with the aim of fostering unity and harnessing talents in the different states of Nigeria.

The festival is also known to be called Nigerias version of the Olympic Games. The festival for 2020 was the 20th edition of the competition and it was hosted at the Samuel Ogbemudia Stadium in Benin City, Edo State.

== Festival activities ==
The National Sport Festival tagged Asaba 2022 was scheduled to hold from April 4, 2020, to April 15, 2020.

The governor of Edo State, Godwin Obaseki, opened the festival by encouraging athletes to put in their best during the tournament.

The official Mascot for this year's event is Erin which means "strength" in the Edo language.

As part of the opening event, Nigerian musician Timi Dakolo performed one of his hit songs titled One Nation. More than 10,000 athletes are expected during the festival.

== Host selection ==
Edo state was awarded the hosting right for the 20th edition after the 19th edition of the competition came to an end in Abuja. This was announced by the Minister of Sport, Barrister Solomon Dalung.

== Tournament medal table ==
At the end of the 20th edition, team Delta topped the medal table winning 158 gold medal, 116 silver medals and 110 bronze medals.

Team Edo came second and this was closely followed by Team Bayelsa who came third at the end of the festival.

Final Medals Standing
States	Gold	Silver	Bronze	Total	Position
Delta	158	116	110	384	1st
Edo	129	104	108	341	2nd
Bayelsa	56	55	58	169	3rd
Rivers	33	34	61	128	4th
Lagos	32	40	54	126	5th
Oyo	31	30	42	103	6th
Akwa Ibom	20	24	44	88	7th
Ogun	16	23	39	78	8th
Kano	11	22	33	66	9th
Imo	10	13	26	49	10th
Ondo	10	9	25	44	11th
Cross River	9	6	15	30	12th
Plateau	8	13	16	37	13th
Abia	7	12	12	31	14th
Kwara	7	6	31	44	15th
FCT	6	15	16	37	16th
Anambra	6	8	21	35	17th
Kaduna	4	5	19	28	18th
Nasarawa	4	3	12	19	19th
Bauchi	3	3	6	12	20th
Niger	3	2	7	12	21st
Enugu	3	1	3	7	22nd
Ekiti	2	3	8	13	23rd
Borno	2	3	5	10	24th
Osun	1	5	2	8	25th
Ebonyi	1	3	6	10	26th
Kogi	1	3	5	9	27th
Gombe	1	1	7	9	28th
Benue	1	1	1	3	29th
Zamfara	1	0	2	3	30th
Jigawa	1	0	0	1	31st
Yobe	0	5	2	7	32nd
Kastina	0	4	7	11	33rd
Kebbi	0	1	5	6	34th
Adamawa	0	0	1	1	35th
Sokoto	0	0	3	3	36th
Taraba	0	0	0	2	37th
Total	577	574	814	1965	
