= Heline Eweni =

Cameroonian philanthropist

Heline Babiene Eweni (born 1996) is a Cameroonian activist and philanthropist helping vulnerable women and children and people with disability. Her philanthropy is noted by her support to people displaced by the Anglophone Crisis. Eweni became an orphan when she lost her both parents at a tender age. Her humanitarian services started by rendering community service through Exceptional Youth Initiative which focuses on free cleaning services in communities. Later, Eweni registered the organisation as a non-profit organisation.

== Award ==
Eweni was named the prize winner of the 2019 Future Africa Leaders Award (FALA) in Nigeria.
