= InnerCity Mission for Children =

- Abbreviation: ICM or ICM4C
- Formation: December 2005
- Founder: Chris Oyakhilome
- Type: Faith-based non-governmental organization (NGO)
- Legal status: Active
- Purpose: Child welfare, poverty alleviation, education, nutrition, and humanitarian aid
- Headquarters: Ikeja, Lagos, Nigeria
- Location: Global (operations in over 100 countries)
- Region served: Worldwide, with focus on inner cities and deprived communities in Africa, South-east Asia, South and Central America
- Key people: Chris Oyakhilome (Founder) Omoh Alabi (Executive Director)
- Website: theinnercitymission.ngo

The InnerCity Mission for Children (ICM) is a faith-based humanitarian non-governmental organization dedicated to addressing child poverty and vulnerabilities by operating with a child-centered approach, emphasizing sustainable interventions in education, health, nutrition, family strengthening, and spiritual development.

Since it was established with the slogan, 'Every Child is Your Child' in December 2005, the organization has grown from one orphanage home to having nineteen 100% free schools for indigent children in 7 countries, 6 food banks in Nigeria, USA and United Kingdom, over a thousand food pantries, women empowerment centres and learning centres, establishing footprints in 132 countries. In 2014, it achieved consultative status with the United Nations Economic and Social Council, enabling it to engage in global policy discussions on child rights and poverty eradication.

In 2010, the InnerCity Mission launched her first 100% free school in Ikeja, Lagos where Children are given 100% basic education, two free meals daily, free medical care, free uniforms and bags, free books, access to library, enrolled in skill acquisition programs without a single payment. In April 2025, President Ellen Johnson Sirleaf commissioned the InnerCity Missions' 100% free school in Paynesville, Liberia. The following month, President Faustin-Archange of the Central Africa Republic flagged off InnerCity Missions' construction of the largest free school in Central Africa Republic, to address the rising numbers of out-of-school children in the Country. By September 2025, the Innercity began constructing the first free school in Fiji Island which will give 400 children access to 100% tuition free education, making it the 19th tuition free school with over 5,000 pupils who are given two free meals daily, free medical care, free books and access to library, and skill acquisition in Africa, Asia and South America.

== 100% Free Schools ==
The InnerCity Mission for Children runs a 100% free school program for indigent children which has 14 built schools with 5 more under construction in Nigeria, Uganda, Central African Republic and Fiji Islands, where children are given primary education and are fed twice a day, free. The children transported daily to and fro school, and are also given school supplies such as uniforms, shoes, school bags textbooks and books every session free. The 12th School in Ibeju-Lekki was launched by the chairman of Parallex Bank, Dr. Adeola Phillips alongside Oba Muideen Balogun, the Onisolu of Solu-Alade Kingdom of Ibeju-Lekki.

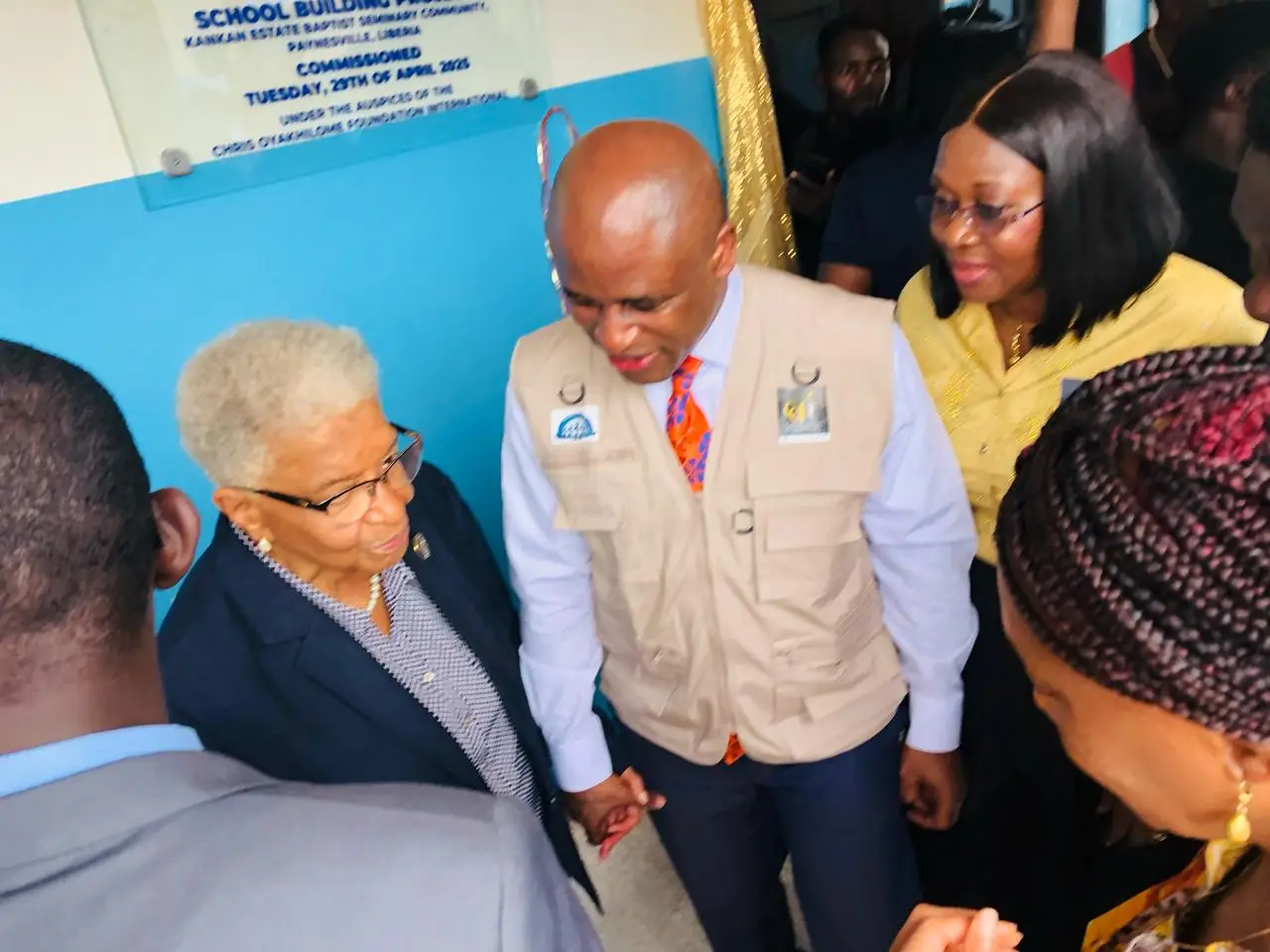
President Ellen Johnson Sirleaf, Pastor Ambrose Isesele and the Director of InnerCity Missions for Children

The 100% free school initiative began with the launch of the first school in Ikeja, Lagos in 2010. The first in Africa outside Nigeria was launched in 2025 by former President Ellen Johnson Sirleaf alongside Minister of Gender, Children and Social Protection, Gbemie Horace-Kollie in Liberia. Three months later, the InnerCity Missions launched her 14th completed free school in Malawi. The ceremony was attended by Malawi's Minister of Basic and Secondary Education, Hon. Madalitso Kambauwa Wirima Pastor Mrs Ose Oyakhilome, representing the founder's faith based institution, Loveworld.

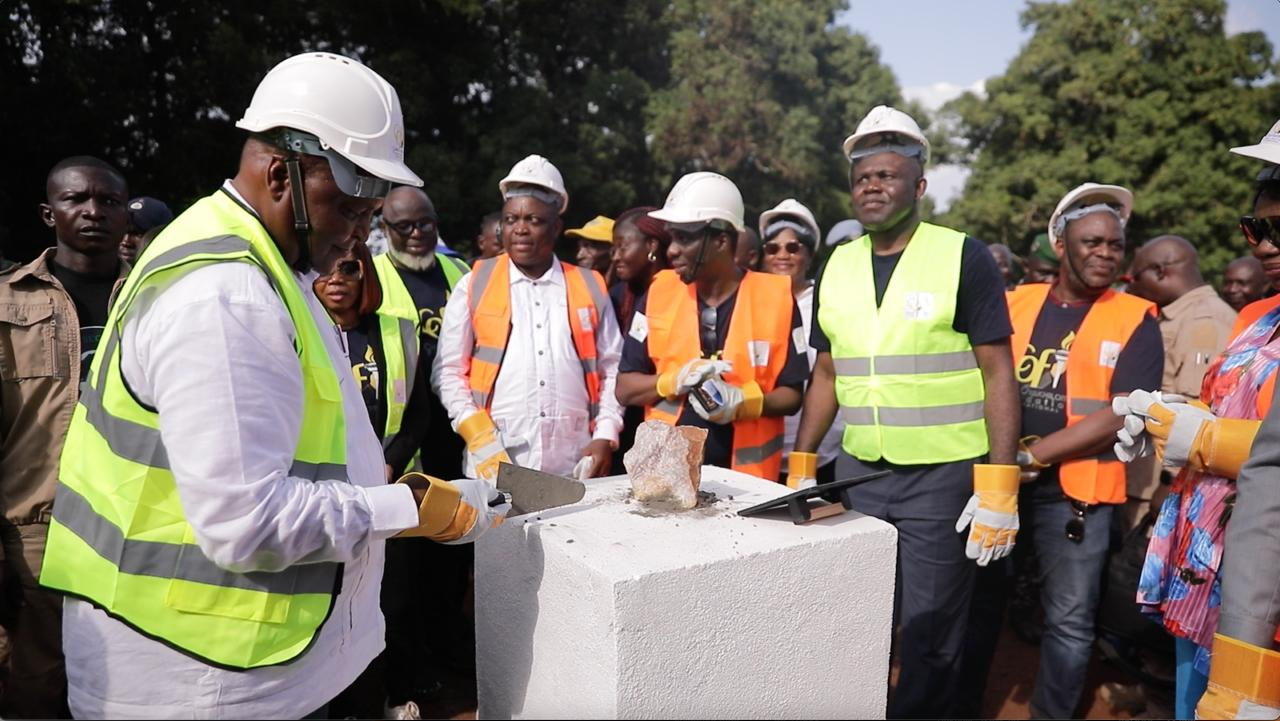
President Fautin-Archange at the InnerCity Mission School groundbreaking ceremony in Libi

President Faustin-Archange Touadéra of the Central African Republic supervised the ground breaking in Libi of the 1,500 capacity InnerCity Mission 100% free school which upon completion, will be the largest in the Country. The President who personally laid the first stone to signal the commencement of construction of the school highlighted the InnerCity Mission's approach addresses the education crisis at its structural pressure points- providing 100 per cent free education, eliminating tuition costs that exclude the poorest households, providing free books, meals, healthcare, directly confronting poverty, hunger, and poor child health, the initiative would be attacking directly the key drivers of dropout and absenteeism in CAR, and by combining education with nutrition and health, the initiative stabilizes children's capacity to remain in school and learn effectively.

In Fiji the Innercity Missions for Children held a ground breaking ceremony in Nadawa for a 400 capacity 100% free school, first in Oceania and also the Country, costed at 2 million dollars, the project was sponsored by Biodun Lawal and the land was donated by a citizen. Nasinu Town Council Special Administrator Chair, Felix Magnus was present to launch it.

| No. | Continent | Country | City / Location | Year Commissioned |
|---|---|---|---|---|
| 1 | Africa | Nigeria | Ikeja, Lagos | 2010 |
| 2 | Africa | Nigeria | Festac, Lagos | Unspecified |
| 3 | Africa | Nigeria | Aba, Abia State | Unspecified |
| 4 | Africa | Nigeria | Owerri, Imo State | Unspecified |
| 5 | Africa | Nigeria | Badagry, Lagos | Unspecified |
| 6 | Asia | India | Pune | 2019 |
| 7 | Africa | Nigeria | Sabongari, Yola, Adamawa State | 2019 |
| 8 | Africa | Nigeria | Simawa, Ogun State | 2021 |
| 9 | Africa | Nigeria | Murbai, Taraba State | May 2022 |
| 10 | Africa | Nigeria | Ewu, Edo State | September 2022 |
| 11 | Africa | Nigeria | Iguobazuwa, Edo State | October 2023 |
| 12 | Africa | Nigeria | Ibeju-Lekki, Lagos State | September 2022 |
| 13 | Africa | Nigeria | Atali, Rivers State | 2026 (under construction) |
| 14 | Africa | Nigeria | Warri, Delta State | 2026 (under construction) |
| 15 | Africa | Uganda | Kampala | 2026 (under construction) |
| 16 | Africa | Malawi | Lilongwe (Chisikwa, Nsudwe community) | 2025 |
| 17 | Africa | Liberia | Monrovia (Paynesville) | May 2025 |
| 18 | Africa | Central African Republic | Bangui | 2026 (under construction) |
| 19 | Oceania | Fiji | Nadawa, Suva | 2026 (under construction) |
