= Trauma Care International Foundation =

Non-governmental organization

- Trauma Care International Foundation
- Founder: Chris Oyakhilome
- Type: Non-governmental
- Headquarters: Lagos, Nigeria
- Key people: Dr. Adeola Adejoke Phillips Chairman
- Award: Guinness World Records for registering most people for blood donation
- Website: https://traumacareinternational.org/

The Trauma Care International Foundation is a non-governmental medical organization under the auspices of the Chris Oyakhilome Foundation International (COFI) that works to improve disaster and emergency medical response and the delivery of trauma care.

The Trauma Care International Foundation gives medical training in first aid and emergency response to responders, teachers, police officers, caregivers and transport workers.

== Achievements ==
In 2018, Guinness World Records recognized the Trauma Care International Foundation for registering the most people for blood donation in an 8-hour time frame. 3,310 people were signed up.

In 2019, the Trauma Care International Foundation was granted a special consultative status in the United Nations Economic and Social Council (ESOSOC) by the United Nations.

In 2020, the Trauma Care International Foundation launched an app which can connect victims of emergencies to the organization's volunteer first responders.
