= Hilda Suka-Mafudze =

Zimbabwean diplomat

Ambassador Hilda Suka-Mafudze

Permanent Representative of African Union to United States
- In office October 2020 – present
- Preceded by: Arikana Chihombori-Quao

Former Ambassador of Zimbabwe to Sudan and South Sudan
- In office 2010–2019

Member of Parliament of Zimbabwe
- In office 2000–2005

Personal details
- Born: Zimbabwe
- Education: Women's University in Africa; University of Leicester
- Occupation: Diplomat

Hilda Suka-Mafudze is a Zimbabwean diplomat and politician who has served as the African Union Ambassador to the United States since October 2020. She is a former Member of Parliament in Zimbabwe and has held several ambassadorial postings, representing Zimbabwe in Sudan, South Sudan, and Malawi.

== Early life and education ==
Suka-Mafudze was born in Zimbabwe. In 2006, she earned a bachelor's degree in Sociology and Gender Development from the Women’s University in Africa. In 2013, she obtained a Master of Arts in International Relations and World Order from the University of Leicester in the UK.

== Career ==
In 2000, Suka-Mafudze was elected as a member of Zimbabwe Parliament. She advocated for marginalized groups and served on parliamentary committees on social services, women’s empowerment, and community development until 2005.

In 2009, Suka-Mafudze was appointed as Zimbabwe’s ambassador to Sudan during a period of political transition and humanitarian challenges. After South Sudan’s independence in 2011, she also continued her service as Zimbabwe’s ambassador to the newly formed country.

In 2019, Suka-Mafudze was appointed as Zimbabwe’s ambassador to Malawi, where she worked on strengthening trade, education exchange, and regional cooperation. While in Malawi, she chaired the group of 16 regional ambassadors representing the Southern African Development Community (SADC).

In October 2020, Suka-Mafudze was appointed as the African Union’s Permanent Representative to the United States, based in Washington, D.C succeeding Dr. Arikana Chihombori-Quao. In this role, she is responsible for representing the African Union’s 55 member states, fostering diplomatic engagement with the U.S. government, Congress, civil society, and the African diaspora.

== Recognitions ==
- 2024: Global Fund for Widows Advocate of the Year Award.
- 2024: Star of Africa Award.

== Personal life ==
Suka-Mafudze is married with four children. She is fluent in English and has working knowledge of French as well as Southern African languages, including Shona and Ndebele. She has emphasized the importance of education and technological access for African women in public remarks.

== See also ==
- African Union
- Arikana Chihombori-Quao
- Foreign relations of Zimbabwe
