= Sunday Akin Dare =

Nigerian journalist and politician (born 1966)

Sunday Akin Dare CON
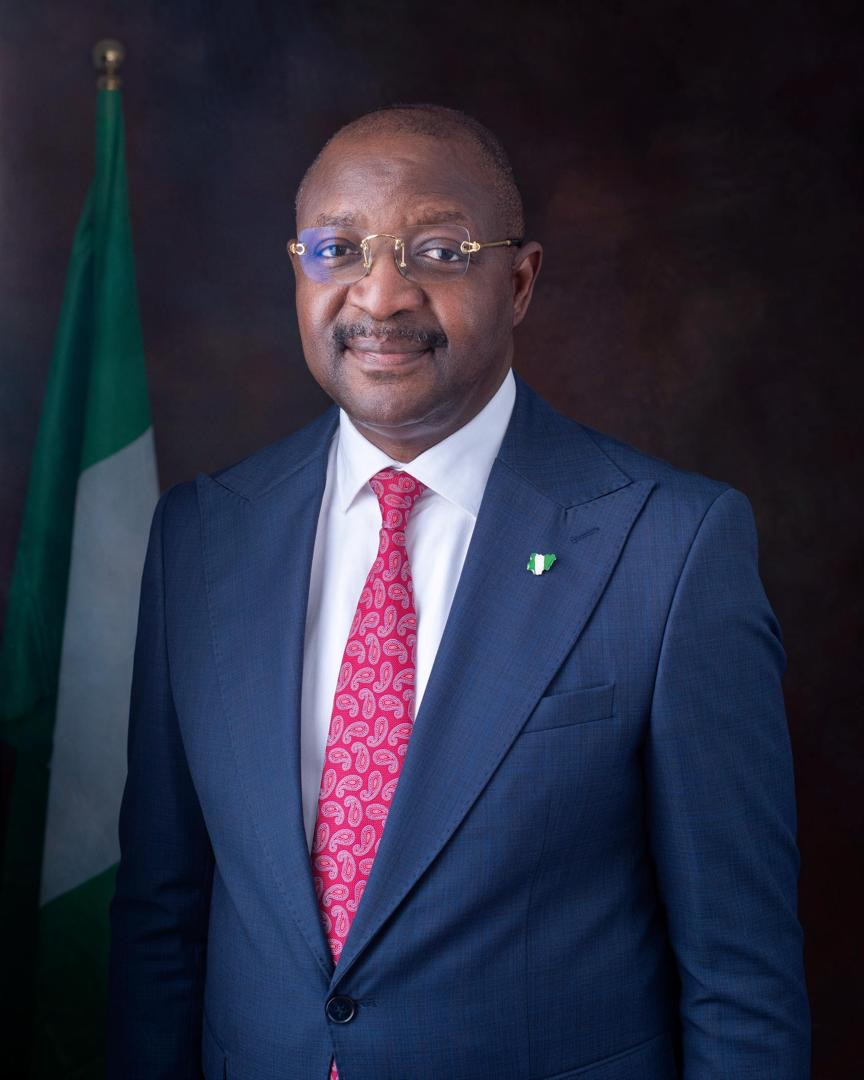
- Dare in 2025

Special Adviser to President Bola Ahmed Tinubu of Nigeria on Media and Public Communications/Spokesperson
- Incumbent
- Assumed office 23 October 2024

Minister of Youth and Sports
- In office 19 August 2019 – May 2023
- Preceded by: Solomon Dalung
- Succeeded by: John Owan Enoh

Executive Commissioner, Stakeholder Management, Nigerian Communications Commission
- In office 2 August 2016 – August 2019

Personal details
- Born: Sunday Akin Dare; 29 May 1966 (age 60)
- Party: All Progressives Congress
- Education: Ahmadu Bello University; University of Jos
- Occupation: Journalist; politician

Sunday Akin Dare CON (born 29 May 1966) is a Nigerian journalist who served as the Nigerian Minister of Youth & Sports from 2019 to 2023. He previously held the position of Executive Commissioner, Stakeholder Management at the Nigerian Communications Commission (NCC), having been appointed by President Muhammadu Buhari in August 2016.

== Education ==
Dare attended Baptist High School in Jos, Nigeria, from 1978 to 1983 for his secondary education. He later pursued Advanced level studies at Oyo State College of Arts and Science, Ile-Ife, Nigeria. He earned a Bachelor of Science (BSc.) honors degree in International studies from Ahmadu Bello University in 1991. He later completed a Master of Arts (MA) in Law and Diplomacy at the University of Jos, Nigeria, in 1996.

In 1998, Dare was chosen as a Freedom Forum Fellow and Visiting Scholar at the School of Journalism at New York University (NYU). He also pursued Media and Public Policy studies (2000–2001) as a Nieman Journalism Fellow at Harvard University.

In 2011, he was awarded the Reuters Foundation Journalism Research Fellowship at the University of Oxford, where his research focused on "New Media and Citizen Journalism in Africa – A Case Study: Using New Media Tools and Citizen Journalism to Investigate Corruption in Nigeria."

== Career ==
Dare began his journalism career about three decades ago by working as a correspondent for The Nation magazine in New York and as a production editor for the European-backed Fourth Estate magazine during Nigeria's military interregnum. He was also part of the founding team of Nigerian weekly magazines The News and Tempo.

Between 2001 and 2009, Dare served as Chief of the Hausa Service, African Division at Voice of America (VOA) in Washington, DC, where he managed various portfolios including the daily production of radio and online broadcast programs. He also led a team of international journalists based in Washington, DC, and correspondents in West Africa for Voice of America.

In 2009, Dare was appointed Senior Special Assistant (Media) to the Minister of Information and Communications. In this role, he managed media-related decisions, public information dissemination, and media policies under the Ministry's jurisdiction. He was instrumental in the sale of the 2.3 GHz spectrum frequency in 2014.

Dare founded the Social Media Clinic (SMC), a Media/Information Technology program aimed at educating citizens about IT development and new media usage for building a responsive society. He also served as the Chief of Staff / Special Adviser on media to former Lagos State Governor who is the current President of Nigeria, His Excellency Asiwaju Bola Ahmed Tinubu, GCON

In 2016, Dare became the Executive Commissioner for Stakeholder Management at the Nigerian Communications Commission (NCC), where he managed the NCC's interactions with public and private sector stakeholders. From 2019 to 2023, he was the Nigerian Minister of Youth & Sports.

On 23 October 2024, President Tinubu appointed him as the Special Adviser on Public Communications and Orientation.

== Youth Development ==
- Over 28,000 youth beneficiaries of the Nigeria Youth investment Fund. NYIF]
- Over 200,000 youth trained in various digital skills across the country.
- Increase in the monthly salary of the NYSC from 19k to 33k and also improvement of their kits
- DEEL- Introduced the DEEL Initiative that covered Digital skills acquisition, Employability, Entrepreneurship and Leadership and Mentoring. Over 350,000 youth secured training under DEEL
- Hosted the first event National Youth Conference in Abuja. November 2021
- Hosted the first ever Commonwealth Youth and African Summit with 18 Commonwealth Countries in attendance.
- Introduced the APP challenge among Nigerian youth for 3 years.
- Secured for Nigeria the Headquarters of the Commonwealth Youth Council. CYC with a population of 1.2 billion Commonwealth Youth.
- Established the 3-month Work Employment Program, WEP, for Nigerian Youth.
- Bilateral - signed bilateral agreements with 7 countries in youth development.
- Leadership training of 42k Youth through Centre for Leadership Training, CLTC.
- Skills Data Bank for the Youth

== Sports Development ==
- National Sports Industry Policy, NSIP, otherwise known as Sports as Business. Developed a new national sports policy with practicable Prescriptions for Nigeria's sports development.
- Adopt Initiative: adopt an athlete, adopt a pitch, adopt a team, adopt a facility. PPP Model.
- Renovation of the Moshood Abiola National Stadium after almost 10 years of lack of proper renovation through a robust public private partnership under the adopt a pitch initiative and has been certified by both CAF and FIFA.
- Renovation of three sections of the National Stadium Surulere. Practically abandoned for about 19 years. The structure is now being restored to its original plan and the main bowl is almost back with new football pitch, new sprinklers, a new 9 lane tartan track, a new digital scoreboard.
- Adopt an athlete: Direct financial support channelled to the home and foreign based Nigeria athletes. Through this initiative over 48 Nigerian athletes got direct funding to the tune of over half a million dollars. Home based got 10k USD and foreign based 20usd.
- Talent Hunt Program, THP.
- Delivered a 10-year Football Masterplan
- The rebuilding of the Nigeria premier league.
- Completed the Headquarters Building of ANOCA (Association of National Olympic Committee of Africa) after almost 10 years of abandonment. The IOC President Thomas Bach was in Nigeria to Commission the building.

== Controversies ==
Sunday Dare denied the Nigeria women's national basketball team the opportunity to participate in the 2022 FIBA Women's Basketball World Cup. He initiated a self-imposed ban on Nigeria's international competition involvement shortly before the scheduled start of the World Cup. This decision drew criticism and disappointment from players such as Ezinne Kalu and Upe Atosu. Kalu expressed her reluctance to represent Nigeria again, while Atosu described the situation as "heart-wrenching".

The controversy escalated when, following FIBA's decision to replace Nigeria with Mali at the World Cup, Sunday Dare lifted the self-imposed ban, citing the "overriding spirit of national interest". This reversal of the ban came after Nigeria had been replaced in the tournament, further intensifying the disappointment among Nigerian female players. The sudden change effectively dashed their dreams and invalidated their hard-fought qualification for the World Cup.

== Honors and recognition ==
Dare was recognized as one of the fifty Leading Nigerians during Nigeria's Golden Jubilee anniversary celebration in North America. He also received the Voice of America Meritorious Honor Award 2009 for his leadership and professional contributions in Africa and the diaspora. Additionally, Dare was listed as a member of the International Committee to Protect Journalists Citation in 2000 in New York City.

== See also ==
- Cabinet of Nigeria
