= Rhapsody of Realities =

2001 book

- Author: Chris Oyakhilome
- Translator: Translators Network International
- Language: Multiple
- Genre: Christian Daily Devotional
- Publisher: Loveworld Publishing, Global Plus Publishers
- Publication date: January 1, 2001
- Website: https://rhapsodyofrealities.org

Rhapsody of Realities is a Christian daily devotional publication by Pastor Chris Oyakhilome. It was first published January 2001 in English and by August 2022, it was reported to have been published in over 7,000 languages. In 2011, it distributed 2 million copies each month globally. During the celebration of its 20th year in print, the publishers reported the devotional has reached a global coverage of all 242 countries and territories of the world with over 3.6 billion copies circulated in 20 years.

The book is released in physical print, audiobook and e-book monthly. It has an article for each day of the month with a daily bible study plan to complete reading the Bible in one and two years. It has variants for Children called Rhapsody of Realities for Early Readers, Teevo for Teenagers, and Braille version for the visually impaired.

== Languages ==
In 2015, Rhapsody of Realities was published in 664 languages with 38 from Nigeria. In 2022, publishers stated they faced challenges with the translations because a large percentage of the world's languages face extinction but had reached 7,000 languages.

== Reach Out Campaign ==
The Reach Out Campaigns began with Reach Out Nigeria where free copies of Rhapsody of Realities were distributed in Nigeria with carnival floats across major cities in the country on October 1, 2007, to celebrate Nigeria's Independence. Subsequent editions featured community development projects, and other activities to instil a sense of patriotism and inspire positive change among Nigerians. Other countries with Christ Embassy Churches began organizing Reach Out Campaigns also. In 2013, Christ Embassy launched Reach Out Nigeria with 20 million copies for distribution and by 2015, 30 million copies were planned for distribution all over the country, Nigeria. In the city of Warri alone, 2 million copies were distributed in 2019.

== Reach Out Foundation ==
The Reach Out Foundation was registered in 2010 to manage the Community Development projects birthed by the distribution of Rhapsody of Realities in different communities. In Warri, an ICT center was donated in 2011, and by 2013, the foundation provided a Hilux truck, 500 mattresses, a generator and computers to the Nigerian Prisons Service. 35 inmates were given a scholarship to study at the Open University in Nigeria.

In 2015, the foundation donated Hospital Equipment to the state owned Government facility, continued its Warri Prison Project, organized Medical Outreach At 8 Locations, and organized Football Tournament Amongst Community Youths And Clubs, Rhapsody of Reality Distribution from October to December across Nigeria. By 2017, the foundation built a Skill Acquisition Centre for prisoners in Warri and boreholes to provide water for different communities across the city of Warri. In 2019, 100 school children in Kaduna were given scholarship to return to schools by the foundation and in 2021, the foundation built and donated a Police Station, 22.5kva generator, borehole and a surveillance van to the Nigerian Police Force in Edo State.
