= Waltham Forest College =

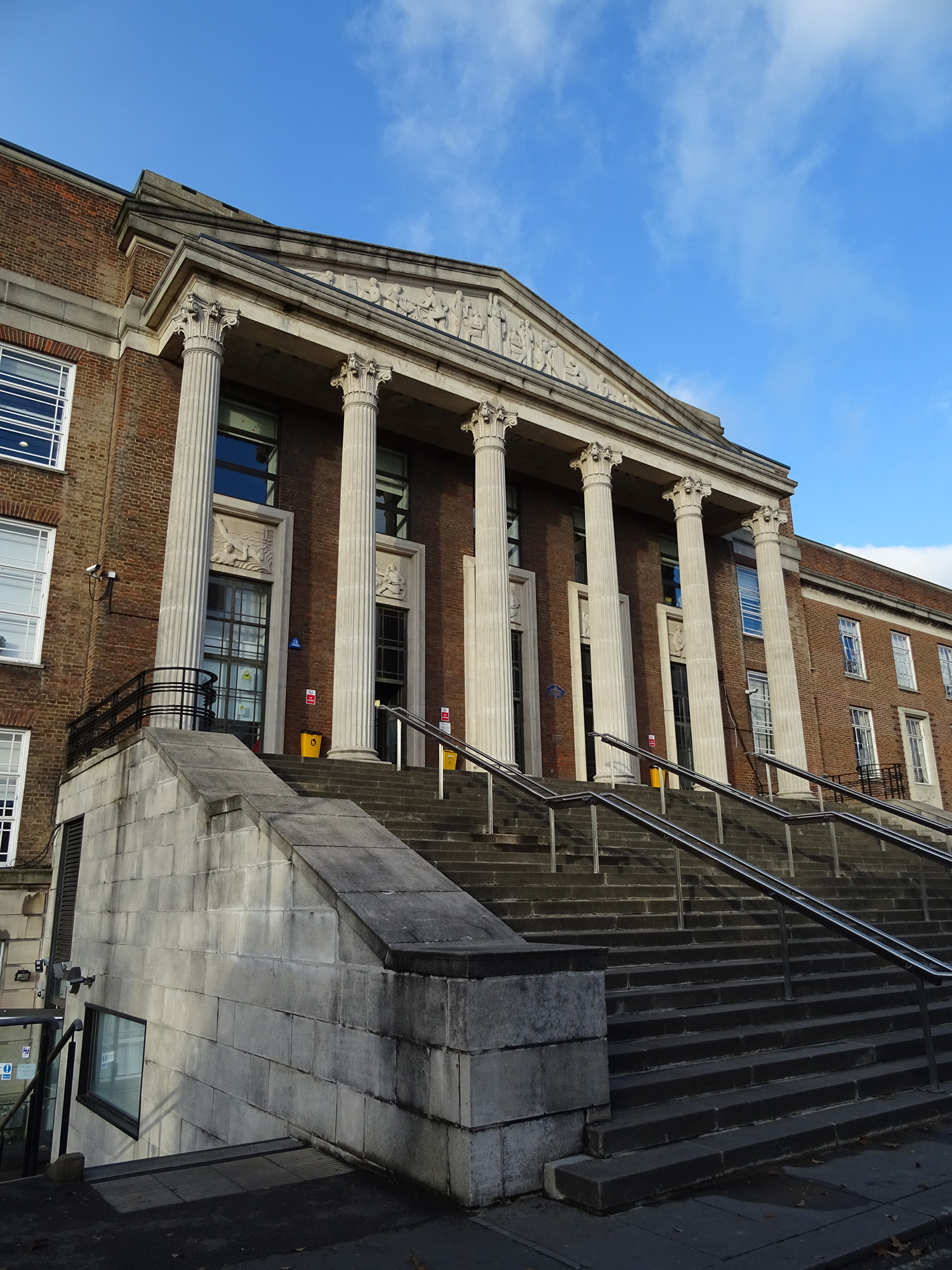

Location
- Forest Road, Walthamstow; London, E17 4JB; England; 51.59125°N 0.01021°W

Information
- Type: Further education college
- Established: 1938
- Local authority: London Borough of Waltham Forest
- Department for Education URN: 130456 Tables
- Principal: Jane Button
- Gender: Coeducational
- Age: 14+
- Enrolment: 4,500+
- Website: www.waltham.ac.uk

Waltham Forest College is a Further Education College in Walthamstow in the London Borough of Waltham Forest. There are around 2,000 16-19-year-old students on full time study programs and 5,000 adult students mainly studying part time, in addition to around 920 apprentices.

== History ==
The college was founded in 1938 as the South-West Essex Technical College and School of Art.

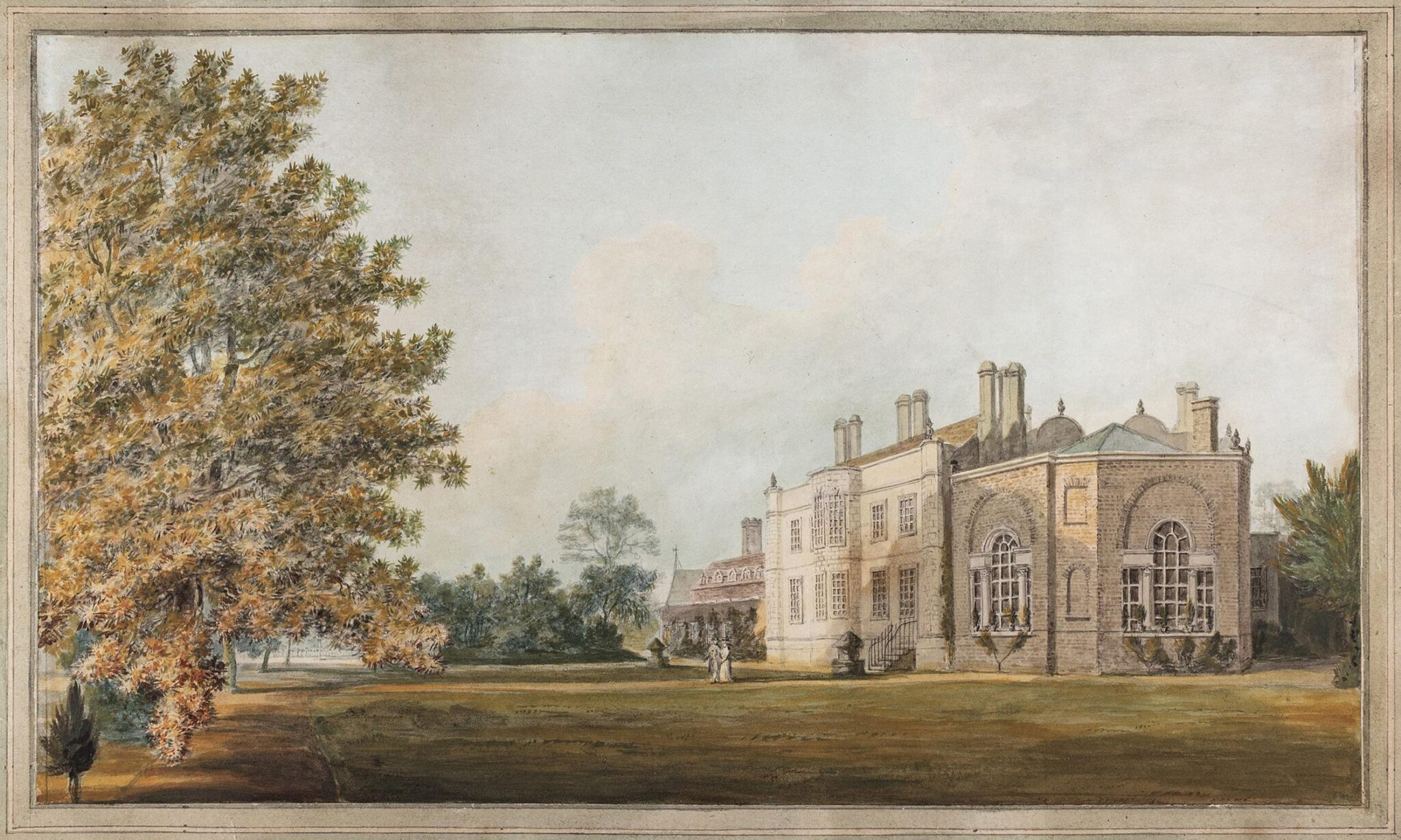
Grosvenor House (Anon) circa 1790

During the Second World War it was used as a naval base. Military and service personnel were taught and trained here, including Auxiliary Territorial Service members from 1942. Grosvenor House, the old building of Walthamstow Technical College, burnt down in 1945. During the 1950s additions to the building were added, while the secondary school part relocated to Billet Road becoming McEntee County Technical School. South West Essex Technical College and School of Art was renamed to Waltham Forest Technical College and School of Art in 1966 after it became part of the new London Borough of Waltham Forest in the county of Greater London.
