= Petronia City =

- City
- Energy City
- Interactive map of Petronia City
- Coordinates: 4°54′17″N 1°51′44″W
- Website: www.petroniacity.com

Petronia City, is a proposed 2000-acre city development project that aims to provide the first fully integrated business hub for West Africa’s oil, gas, and mining industries. The proposed development is being undertaken by Wonda World Estates and the Petronia City Development affiliate. The site is approximately 8 kilometres from Takoradi.

The Petronia City project was founded to solve the lack of infrastructures in Ghana’s Western Region, following the 2007 oil discovery and improve growth in the socio-economic activity in the region.

As of December 2023, development of the city has yet to begin.
