= Arikana Chihombori-Quao =

Zimbabwean physician and diplomat

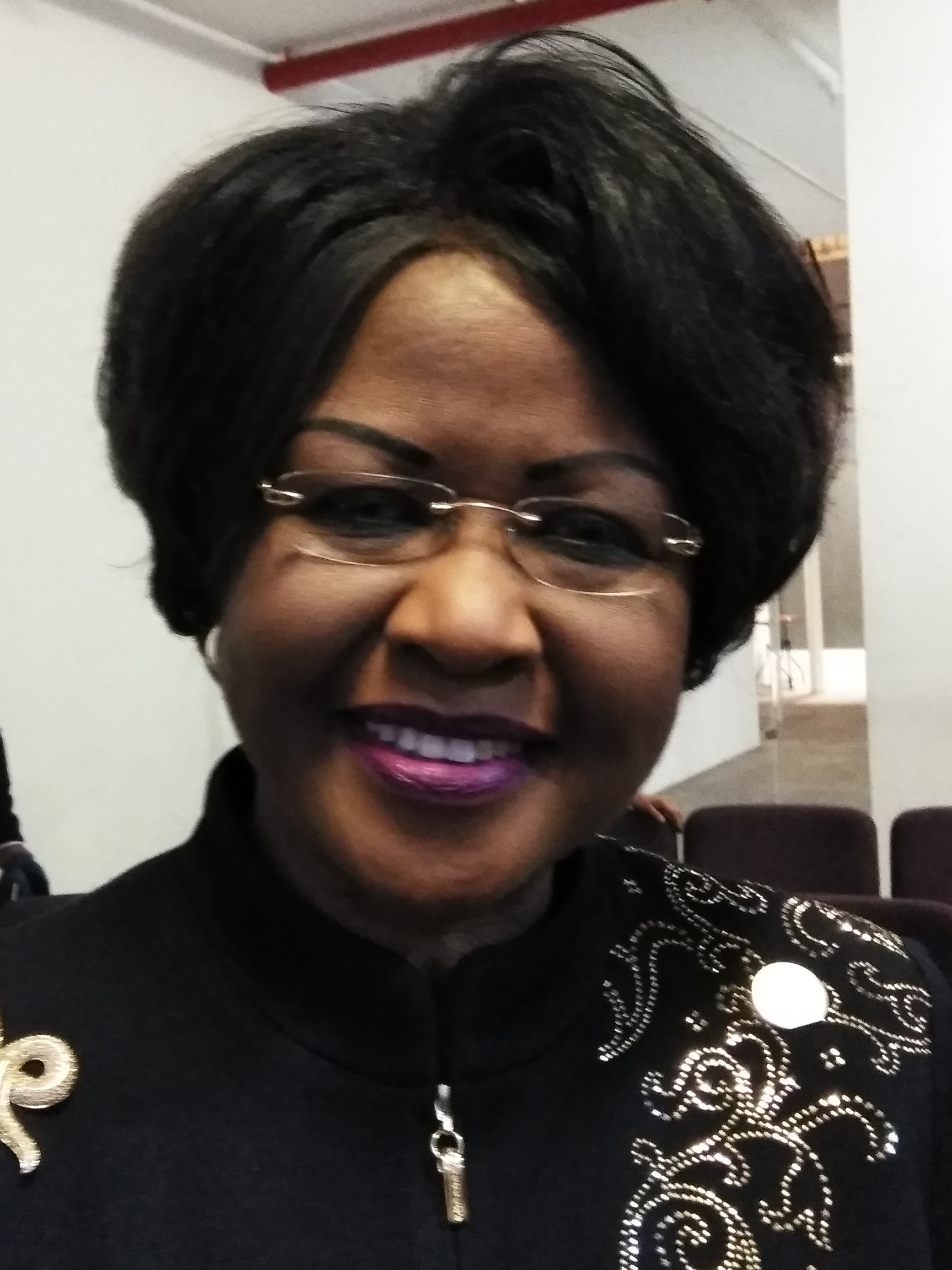

Permanent Representative of the African Union to the United States
- In office December 2016 – October 7, 2019
- President: Moussa Faki
- Succeeded by: Hilda Suka-Mafudze

Personal details
- Born: Zimbabwe
- Spouse: Dr. Nii Saban Quao
- Children: 5
- Education: Fisk University; Meharry Medical College
- Occupation: physician; diplomat

Arikana Chihombori-Quao is a Zimbabwean physician, diplomat, and activist. She served as the African Union's representative to the United States from 2016 to 2019. She is a prominent advocate of Pan-Africanism, and is outspoken about the legacy of the Berlin Conference, which she argues imposed artificial divisions on Africa whose effects persist today.

Born in Zimbabwe, she later moved to the United States, where she practiced family medicine for 29 years in Murfreesboro, Tennessee, and founded Bell Family Medical Centers.

== Early life ==
Chihombori grew up in the village of Chivhu in Zimbabwe. She emigrated to the US in 1977.

== Career ==
Chihombori is a graduate of Fisk University and Meharry Medical College. She did a residency in Family Medicine at Meharry Medical College in Nashville, Tennessee.

She holds a bachelor's degree in General Chemistry, a master's degree in organic chemistry, and a Doctor of Medicine degree. She graduated from Meharry Medical College of Medicine in 1986. Her specialty was family medicine. She is the founder of medical clinics. As an entrepreneur she purchased property that built a US-based Africa House. She is the owner of the Durban Manor Hotel Cultural House in Durban, South Africa.

From 1996 to 2012 Chihombori-Quao was the medical director for Mid Tenn Medical Associates, and the Smyrna Ambulance Service

She is the second African Union Permanent Representative to hold that position. Ambassador Amina Salum Ali was the prior AU - US Ambassador. She is the Chair of the African Union-African Diaspora Health Initiative (AU-ADHI), since 2012.

From 2012 to 2016, Chihombori-Quao served as the Chair of the African Union-African Diaspora Health Initiative (AU-ADHI). As the chair of the AU-ADHI her work involves mobilizing Africans in the Diaspora health professionals in assisting with Africa's continental healthcare crisis.

Since 2010, Chihombori-Quao has been the International Chair of the African Union-Diaspora African Forum Americas (AU-DAF). In this capacity she advocates for Africans and friends of Africa to participate in the development of Africa.

In January 2019, Chihombori-Quao launched the "Wakanda One Village Project". The project will begin in Zambia and in Zimbabwe. Both of these countries have made offers of land. The Wakanda project seeks to engage Africans in the Diaspora.

The "Wakanda One Village Project", is slated to consist of five African Centers of excellence in the five regions on the continent of Africa. The five centers are to be centers of development to have state-of-the-art healthcare facilities, hotels, industrial homes, shopping centers, etc.

On October 7, 2019, she received notice by letter that she was no longer ambassador for the African Union in Washington. An online petition was started for Chihombori-Quao to be reinstated. The letter, from African Union chair Moussa Faki Mahamat to Chihombori-Quao, dated October 7, 2019, was also published online.

== Awards ==
- In 2015, at the African Union Summit - Chihombori-Quao received the "Women of Excellence Award". Arikana Chihombori-Quao: My mandate is to promote Africa in the Americas and more importantly, to mobilise the African diaspora - meaning all people of African descent living outside of Africa.
- A Fellow of the American Academy of Family Physicians recipient of several awards.
- In 1996 she was awarded achievement award by the late President Nelson Mandela of the Republic of South Africa for her contributions to Africa.
