= Solomon Dalung =

Nigerian Politician, lawyer and academic (born 1964)

Barr Solomon Dalung
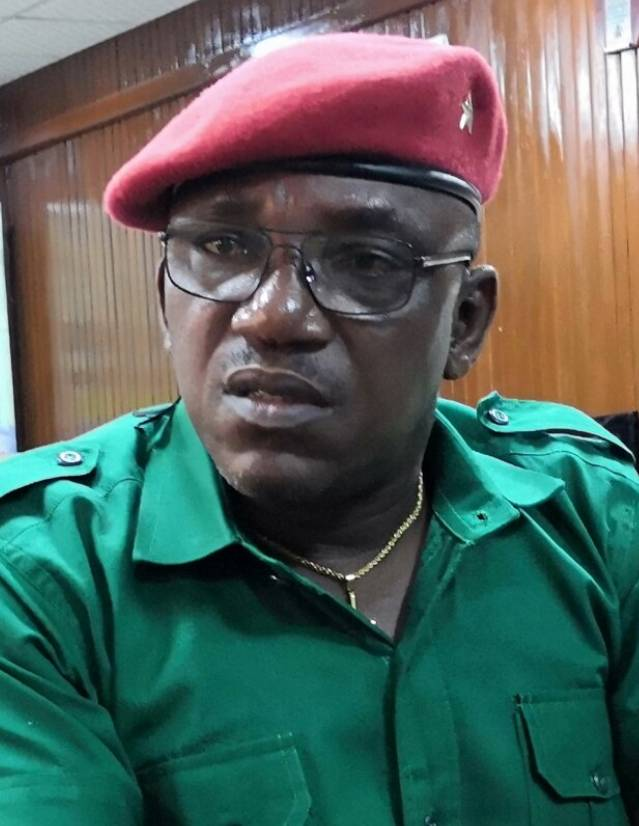
- Dalung in 2020

Minister of Youth & Sports
- In office 11 November 2015 – 28 May 2019
- Preceded by: Boni Haruna
- Succeeded by: Sunday Dare

Personal details
- Born: Solomon Selcap Dalung; 26 September 1964 (age 61)
- Party: All Progressives Congress
- Education: University of Jos
- Occupation: Politician; lawyer

Solomon Selcap Dalung (born 26 September 1964) is a Nigerian lawyer, academic and politician who served as the Minister of Youth and Sports of Nigeria from November 2015 to May 2019. He has served in the Nigerian Prisons Service, the University of Jos as a lecturer and as Chairman of Langtang South Local Government in Plateau State.

== Early life and education ==
Solomon Dalung was born on 26 September 1964 in Sabo Gida, Plateau State. He had his primary school education at the Local Education Authority Primary School, Sabon Gida in Langtang South Local Government Area of Plateau State from 1971 to 1977. He then proceeded to Government College Keffi, Nassarawa State for his secondary school education. After his secondary education, he proceeded to the University of Jos, where he graduated with LLB degree in 2000 and was called into the Nigerian Bar in 2001 at the Nigerian Law School, Abuja Campus. He obtained a Master of Laws (LLM) degree from the University of Jos in 2007 while he was a lecturer at the same Institution.

== Career ==
=== Nigerian Prisons Service career ===
Barr. Dalung joined the Nigerian Prisons Service as a Prison Assistant in 1982 where he rose to the rank of Assistant Inspector of Prisons. In 1991, while still in the Prisons Service, he enrolled to the Law Program of the University of Jos to obtain a Bachelor of Laws degree which he obtained in the year 2000. Following his training as an attorney at the University of Jos and the Nigerian Law School, he was moved to the Legal Department at Prisons Headquarters Abuja in 2004 where he served as Legal Officer II but he retired the same year from the Prisons Services.

=== Academic career ===
In 2004, after his retirement from the Nigerian Prisons Service, he took up an appointment as a lecturer with the Law Faculty of the University of Jos.

=== Political career ===
He started his political Career as a Personal Assistant to Chief Solomon Lar, CON, when Lar was appointed as Adviser Emeritus to President Olusegun Obasanjo until 2003. In 2007, he was appointed the Chairman of Langtang South Local Government Area up till May 2008. In his position as Local Government Chairman, he served as the Plateau State Deputy Chairman of the Association of Local Government Chairmen of Nigeria (ALGON) and later as the Chairman of the Association. After his term as Local Government Chairman, he attempted to represent Langtang North and South in the National Assembly but was unsuccessful. He was a member of the Northern Elders Forum (NEF) and was also member of President Muhammadu Buhari's Transitional Committee.

Towards the end of his tenure he claimed that he would not be removed as a minister. However, his tenure ended as the minister of youth and sport in May 2019.

== Personal life ==
Solomon Dalung is married with children. He lost his first wife in 2017. He is a Christian.

== Awards and recognitions ==
Solomon Dalung alongside Akinwunmi Ambode, Willie Obiano, Lai Mohammed, Chioma Ajunwa-Opara, Herbert Wigwe Patrick Ifeanyi Ubah were shortlisted to be honoured at the second edition of the "Bunubunu Sports and Culture Award" on Saturday, 2 February 2019.

In 2018, he received an award of All Times at the "Independence Hero's Award" on Saturday, 13 October in Calabar.
