= Chris Oyakhilome =

Nigerian pastor (born 1963)

The Reverend Chris Oyakhilome
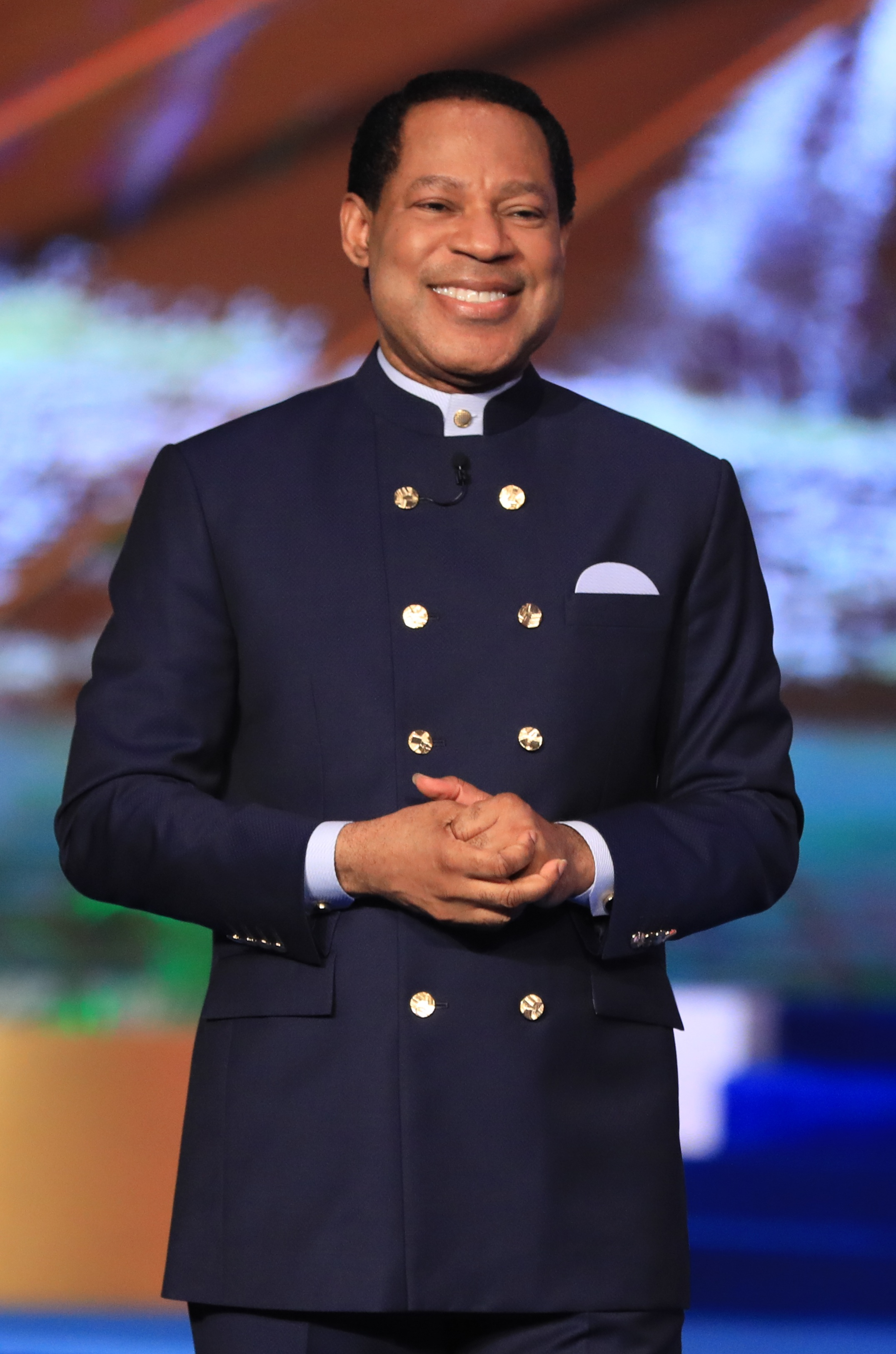
- Oyakhilome in 2022
- Born: 7 December 1963 (age 62); Edo State, Nigeria
- Occupations: Pastor; faith healing minister; television host; author; philanthropist
- Known for: Global Evangelical outreach
- Notable work: Founder, LoveWorld Inc
- Spouse: Anita Ebhodaghe (m. 1991; div. 2016)
- Children: 2
- Website: www.pastorchrisonline.org

Christian Oyakhilome (born 7 December 1963) is a Nigerian televangelist and the founder of LoveWorld Incorporated (also known as Christ Embassy), a Christian ministry based in Lagos. He is the author of the daily devotional Rhapsody of Realities. His ministry includes a global television network and branches in several countries. Oyakhilome has faced criticism and regulatory sanctions for promoting pseudoscience and conspiracy theories regarding HIV, malaria, and COVID-19.

== Early life and education ==
Chris Oyakhilome was born on 7 December 1963, to Tim and Angelina Oyakhilome in Edo State, Nigeria. He is the third of seven children. Several of his siblings, including his brother Ken and sister Kathy, hold leadership positions within the LoveWorld ministry.

He attended Edo College, and gained admission into Bendel State University on a scholarship, later renamed Ambrose Alli University, Ekpoma. Here, he studied and obtained a first degree in Architecture.

== Ministry and theology ==
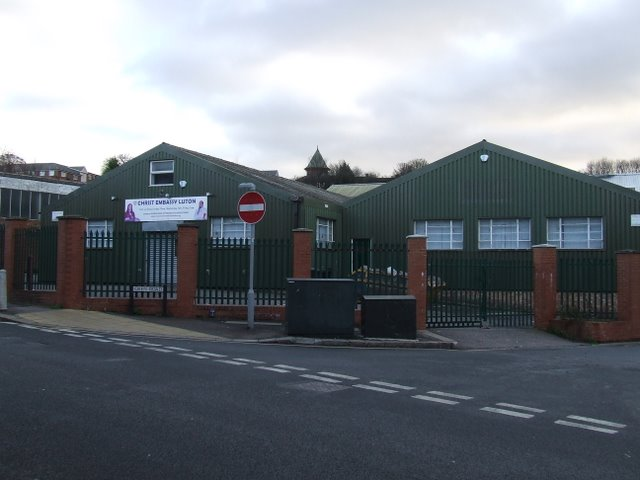
Christ Embassy in Luton, England

Upon graduating in 1987, Oyakhilome established Christ Embassy in Lagos. As of February 2023, there were BLW Campus Fellowships and Christ Embassy Churches in higher institutions and major cities around the world. The church runs an "International School of Ministry" and operates a global prayer network. His ministry has expanded to include the "Inner City Mission" for humanitarian aid and the "Volunteer Medical Corps."

Oyakhilome's ministry began while he was a student on campus at Ambrose Alli University. As an undergraduate, he founded a youth ministry called Youth For Christ, which became the largest fellowship at Bendel State University. In one of his services, Oyakhilome gave an account of how the vice chancellor at the time attended his service once on Campus.

Christ Embassy is a Pentecostal church, formerly known as Believers' Love World Incorporated. It has been described as following an American megachurch model of large auditoria and stresses success and material blessing, and has been criticised for "opulence amid poverty". Oyakhilome's teaching is that prosperity is a blessing of God. Oyakhilome's church encourages followers to give money as seeds, teaching that those who donate to his ministry will also be rewarded with wealth and health and escape poverty. He has responded to criticism of this aspect of his ministry, stating that, "True prosperity comes from spiritual growth and adherence to God's principles, not mere material accumulation."

Oyakhilome also founded a Christian-based television network, which broadcasts worldwide from Africa. Oyakhilome also hosts Higher Life conferences in Nigeria, Ghana, South Africa, the UK, the US, and Canada, and organised the Night of Bliss South Africa event at the FNB Stadium in Johannesburg. Oyakhilome also operates an International School of Ministry, which held one of its Ministers' Network Conferences in 2016 with 5,000 ministers in attendance from 145 countries, in Johannesburg, South Africa.

He runs an online prayer network using social media to send messages to Christians in several countries and operates a smartphone messenger called KingsChat. In 2015, Oyakhilome was given an honorary doctorate from Ambrose Alli University and Benson Idahosa University. In 2017, in partnership with Benny Hinn, he created the Christian cable channel LoveWorld USA.

== Personal life ==
Chris Oyakhilome married Anita Ebhodaghe on 2 February 1991. They met as students at the university. Anita was also a pastor in Christ Embassy and was widely known as Pastor Anita. They later had two daughters.

The couple filed for divorce on 9 April 2014. In an official release made by Pastor Anita's legal team, Attwaters Jameson Hill, the divorce was confirmed completed on 8 February 2016, stating, "Anita Oyakhilome would like to confirm that she is no longer involved in or part of Christ Embassy AKA Believers Loveworld Inc."

In 2011, Forbes estimated Oyakhilome's wealth as between $30 million and $50 million.

== Charitable work ==
Oyakhilome operates the Inner City Mission Project, which works to assist orphaned and impoverished children in inner cities in several countries.

Other agencies supported by Chris Oyakhilome Foundation International (COFI) include the Volunteer Medical Corps, Trauma Care International Foundation, Future Africa Leaders Foundation, and the Bible for All Mission.

In an inquiry started in 2013, the UK Charity Commission found there was "serious misconduct and/or mismanagement" in the administration of the "Christ Embassy", a charity associated with Oyakhilome and his church's activities. An interim manager was appointed to review the activities and governance of the charity, leading to a report that "the board of trustees appears to be fragmented" and "appear to have little appreciation of their roles, duties and obligations as Trustees". The interim manager served until the appointment of a new board of trustees in 2016. Following the appointment of the new board of trustees, significant progress was made to address the governance and improve oversight and control of the charity.

== Honours ==
Honorary Doctorate in Divinity (DD) from Benson Idahosa University.

Honorary Doctorate Doctor of Science (DSc) Award, Ambrose Alli University (his alma mater).

In December 2023, he was named the Chancellor – Head of Government and Chairman Plenipotentiary of Weldios University.

== Controversies ==
Oyakhilome has garnered attention for his advocacy of faith healing as a potential solution for HIV/AIDS.

Oyakhilome also supports YouTube-propagated conspiracy theories, including a video he posted linking the Corona Virus with the 5G mobile network rollout and a conspiracy of the "New World Order." He has preached against vaccines and has been accused of undermining efforts to eradicate serious infectious diseases. He has also spoken against vaccines for malaria.

In 2021, the UK broadcasting regulator Ofcom fined the LoveWorld television network £125,000. The regulator found that the network had aired potentially harmful claims about the COVID-19 pandemic, including the unsubstantiated theory that the virus was linked to the rollout of 5G technology.

== Writings ==
Oyakhilome has authored several Christian books. His most prominent work is the daily devotional Rhapsody of Realities, which is distributed globally by the church. He co-authored the text with his former wife, Anita, prior to their divorce.
