= Sterling One Foundation =

Private foundation operating in Africa

The Sterling One Foundation
- Formation: 2018; 8 years ago
- Founder: Sterling Bank
- Type: Non-governmental organization
- Headquarters: Lagos, Nigeria
- Website: https://onefoundation.ng/

The Sterling One Foundation (SOF) is a private foundation founded in 2018. It has its headquarters in Nigeria but operates across Africa. The foundation is an initiative of the Sterling Bank, though operates as an independent body with its own structure and board of trustee. In 2022, it partnered with the United Nations in Nigeria to host the 2023 Africa Social Impact Summit in Lagos, Nigeria. It has also collaborated with the Deputy British High Commissioner to Nigeria to launch the 2023 edition of the 16 Days of Activism Against Gender-Based Violence in Nigeria.

== Background and mission ==
The foundation commits to itemizing the various challenges facing Africa and proffer solutions and methods in addressing them in a way that would drive social impact across five sectors of the economy which include health, education, food security, gender equality and climate action. In 2021, with the creation of the first free crowdfunding platform in Africa known as giving.ng it was given a CSR award in recognition of its role in social impact contribution to society. Giving.ng is a platform that provides finishing grants to projects that are crowdfunded through it. The foundation, through the crowdfunding platform enables a wide range of social, health, and educational developments to take shape within Africa.

== History ==
The foundation was established in 2018 in Lagos, Nigeria with a mission to enhance healthcare access, increase education access, fight climate change, empower women, and improve food security. Through its initiatives, the NGO has supported about 3,000 NGOs across Africa through capacity-building initiatives. In 2019, the foundation launched the crowdfunding platform, Giving.ng to help raise funds to support Nigerian NGOs. Through the Giving.ng platform, the NGO has over the years raised funds to support Nigerian NGOs, directly impacting the lives of over 2,000 individuals. In 2020, the foundation introduced the Health Workers Fund and initiated various other projects. These efforts have positively impacted over 1,000 lives, including 154 families. Moreover, the foundation has reached over 15 million people through its online and offline activities. In collaboration with the Nigerian Network of NGOs and Sterling Bank, the foundation in 2020 introduced Sterling CARES, Africa’s first free banking solution designed exclusively for the non-profit community. Currently, more than 150 organizations across Nigeria benefit from this free banking service. In 2020 and 2021, the foundation forged partnerships with over 21 organizations, collectively striving for positive change. These collaborations involved numerous dedicated volunteers and encompassed short-term, medium-term, and long-term projects. These initiatives focused on providing essential food and nutrition to families and less privileged, supporting the nation’s healthcare sector in its battle against the deadly Coronavirus, and designing and executing water, sanitation, and hygiene projects to benefit communities. In 2021, the NGO also provided essential support for the 26th edition of the Nigerian Economic Summit, themed ‘Building Partnership for Resilience.’ This event engaged more than 6,000 decision-makers from across Nigeria, both online and offline. In 2023, the organization announced partnership with the United Nations to host the 2023 Africa Social Impact Summit (ASIS) that held on 10th and 11th August in Lagos, Nigeria. The summit ushered in the UN and other stakeholders including leaders of NGOs, heads of government parastatals, international investors, private equity firms, as well as members of the general public who have deeply invested in the growth and progress of Africans. In 2024, the NGO also partnered with the UN and the Lagos state government to launch ASIS in the state. In partnership with the Nigerian Exchange Group (NGX) and other stakeholders, the foundation convened for the 10th annual Ring the Bell for Gender Equality/Closing Gong ceremony hosted at the Nigerian Exchange Group on March 8 2024. The convention was to address the multifaceted challenges hindering Nigerian women from realizing their full potential while spotlighting existing opportunities for women to grow and thrive.

== Governance ==
The foundation was an initiative and establishment of the Sterling Bank, however operates independently with a separate board of trustees. With its structure, it has prioritized social impact investments in critical sectors to maximize its positive influence mostly in Nigeria and Africa at large. The NGO has its headquarters in Lagos Nigeria.

=== Board ===
Members of the Board

- Razack Adeyemi Adeola (chairman)
- Bashir Borodo
- Ben Akabueze Ifeanyi
- Omolara Akanji
- Abubakar Suleiman

=== Executive Management ===
- Olapeju Ibekwe - Chief Executive Officer
- Solomon Okonkwo - Programme and Operations Lead
- Saheed Adegoke - Head of Finance and Accounts
- Ruth Ozigbo - Programme Manager
- Godfrey Orji - Project Lead
- Gideon Achomhi - Grants and Research Lead
- Samuel Ajayi - Programme Officer, Education

== Programs and Initiatives ==
=== Education and youth development ===
In 2020, the foundation raised a substantial amount of fund of over 77,7 million, from 4,466 donors to support its initiatives. Furthermore, the foundation contributed to the construction and renovation of three schools. Additionally, the foundation offered scholarships to about 150 students from Lagos slums, as well as awarded finishing grants to eight projects in Nigeria as it also aims at enhancing educational access amongst Africans.

=== Gender equality, youth and women development ===
In 2021, the foundation supported the Girls and Women Technological Empowerment Organization (GWTEO) initiative. This effort included providing a finishing grant and facilitating access to donors, resulting in the training of over 100 girls in STEM (Science Technology Engineering and Mathematics) fields such as robotics, solar installation, and mathematics, as well as soft skills like communication and leadership. The training encompassed diverse areas such as Upcycling, Solar Efficiency, Leadership, and Sustainability. SOF in collaboration with the Whitefield Foundation and the Coca-Cola Foundation launched the EQUIP initiative which is an initiative that was set up to empower about 60,000 women and youths in Nigeria by providing them with employability and entrepreneurial skills, enabling them to achieve sustainable income and livelihoods. The foundation also partnered with the Global Youth Alliance program to create a structure that aims at empowering 250,000 youths in Africa. In 2023, the foundation partnered with the Centre for Awareness on Justice and Accountability (CAJA), and the Nigeria SCALE Project to raise advocacy against gender-based violence and other forms of abuse in Nigeria. This initiative involved organizing screenings of the ‘CHATROOM’ movie, which was designed to empower survivors, encourage them to speak out, and provide essential psychological support to those in need.

=== Africa Social Impact Summit (ASIS) ===
In 2022, SOF took another significant step by launching the Africa Social Impact Summit (ASIS). ASIS is dedicated to charting a sustainable course for transforming the African continent through impactful investments in critical areas of the economy.

=== Climate action ===
In 2021, the foundation engaged in climate action by adopting four beaches under the beach clean-up initiative in Lagos, Nigeria. The beaches includes; Eleko, Alpha, Iwerekun, and Lafiaja Beach, resulting in the collection of approximately 10 tonnes of plastic waste. In the same year, it also supported the construction of a free school in the Iyara Community through collaboration with the Cleverminds Foundation.

=== Food security ===
The foundation in 2020 established the IDP Support Initiative, providing food supplies to 800 internally displaced persons (IDP) at the Nasarawa State IDP camp.

=== Health ===
In 2020, the foundation established the Health Workers Fund, a significant initiative aimed at supporting healthcare professionals and enhancing healthcare infrastructure. This initiative had a direct positive impact on over 1,000 lives, benefiting 154 families. It reached approximately 15 million people online and offline. The foundation supported the successful treatment of two cancer patients. It also partnered with the Leah Foundation to raise awareness about cancer and crowdfunded to screen 186 women for cancer. This initiative aimed to promote early detection and prevention, ultimately contributing to improved public health outcomes.

== Awards and recognitions ==
- In 2021, It won AS+A Communications’ Award of Excellence for Corporate Social Responsibility in recognition of its positive impact across Nigeria.
- The foundation was awarded the ECOSEA Award for Most Outstanding Foundation in Environmental Sustainability organized by Brand Communicator in 2022.
- It has also received the Best NGO in Governance Practices award at the CSR 2024 festival.
