= Abrantee Boateng =

English DJ, host and pioneer of Afrobeats (born 1981)

- Born: 1981 (age 44–45); Croydon, London, United Kingdom
- Occupations: Radio and television presenter, DJ, events promoter
- Known for: Pioneering the Afrobeats movement in the UK
- Notable work: Launching the world's first Afrobeats show on UK radio

Abrantee Boateng is a radio and television presenter, club DJ and events promoter. He is known professionally as DJ Abrantee, the pioneer of the Afrobeats movement who branded and launched the world's first ever "Afrobeats" show on UK radio on 11 April 2011. Abrantee is also one of the best known voices of urban radio station Capital Xtra in the United Kingdom.

== Early life ==
Born in Croydon to Akan parents, Abrantee Boateng grew up there until the family moved to East London when he was seven years old. He attended Stratford School in Forest Gate. His interest in music was ignited during his teenage years by a cousin who had a sound system and introduced Boateng to his record collection and took him along to various events to experience DJing. He spent three years shadowing his cousin around clubs and venues in London. Following his cousin's decision to leave the music business, Abrantee inherited his record collection. In the early 1990s, he joined a group of DJs called 90% who were promoting events in London. Boateng is proud of being able to speak the Twi language, predominantly used in Akan territories within Ghana.

== Radio career ==
Abrantee Boateng, also known professionally as DJ Abrantee, started his radio career in 2005 working the night shift at Choice FM and filling in for absentees whilst continuing his work as a DJ on the club circuit. The following year, Boateng was asked to present Saturday's Choice, a show that aired once a month on a Saturday. In 2007, the success of Saturday's Choice led to a permanent position at Choice FM to host the new Morning Riser show between 3:00 am and 6:00 am from Monday to Friday. He then moved to another time slot in March 2010 to present the station's weekday evening show from 8:00 pm to 12:00 am. The evening show consisted of tracks from Choice FM's playlist but also included interviews with high-profile artists: Diddy, Usher, Drake, Dizzee Rascal, Kelly Rowland, Big Boi, Labrinth, Kelis, Taio Cruz, Flo Rida, Travie McCoy, Tinchy Stryder, Jeremih, Loick Essien, Jason Derulo among others.

In April 2011, Choice FM announced that Abrantee would become the new presenter of its drivetime show between 4:00 pm and 8:00 pm from Monday to Friday (the Friday show was replaced). It was also announced that Abrantee would start hosting a new programme entirely dedicated to Afrobeats from 12:00 am to 2:00 am every Saturday, entitled Afrobeats with Abrantee which launched on 16 April 2011 after years of pitching the concept to station bosses. The show was one of the most tweeted about topics on Twitter, which resulted in Choice FM trending for the first time on the social networking site. Afrobeats with Abrantee is presently broadcasts between 11:00 pm and 1:00 am every Saturday on Capital XTRA. Abrantee launched The Afrobeats Chart in 2013 and added news anchor Toolz to his news segment.

On 12 August 2017, Abrantee suffered a stroke at home.

On 18 January 2018, Capital XTRA announced the new weekend line-up. In this, it revealed that Abrantee would be "taking a break", with new presenter Afro B covering his show until his return.

== Outside radio ==
Besides his radio career, Abrantee Boateng is also a club DJ, an event promoter and entrepreneur. He is the main protagonists of the Afrobeats scene in the United Kingdom and beyond and has hosted various events across the world. In July 2011, he launched Afrobeats Sundays. A weekly event held at the Proud 2 club at The O2 Afrobeats Sundays in October 2011 celebrated the first year of the first Afrobeats UK club tour, visiting more than 12 cities around the UK and Ireland. The Afrobeats UK Movement would run for a number of years, with homegrown talent such as Vibe Squad, Mista Silva, May7ven, Skob, kwamz & Flava, plus many more.

In December 2011, Abrantee released his first Afrobeats mixtape Afrobeats Mix Volume One under Record Label Skata Records, Published and Facilitated by DLA PR which featured a collection of Afrobeats artists and songs interspersed with vocal contributions from Lethal bizzle, Tinchy Stryder, Bashy and others. This led to DJ Abrantee being included in two broad sheet pieces on Afrobeats, the first one in The Guardian in January 2012 and the second one in the London Evening Standard in February 2012. Both articles highlighted his role in the resurgence of the music genre in the United Kingdom. It drew the interest of The Guardian once again in July 2012 when Abrantee brought Afrobeats to an unlikely venue and hosted Afrobeats at Somerset House with appearances from Olu Maintain, Atumpan, May7ven, Vibe Squad, dance troupes and many more. In January 2013, he went one step further producing a follow-up compilation album entitled Afrobeats Ultimate Collection Released under Choice FM.

In addition to his commitment to Afrobeats, Abrantee Boateng is also one of the founders of the annual Afrobeats Music Festival official Ghana Independence Celebration in London. The first event took place in March 2000 at the Rex Theatre in Stratford, where 3000 attendees gathered to celebrate the independence of Ghana from the United Kingdom. The festival moved to a bigger venue, the IndigO2 at The O2, in 2011, and is held annually in March at the venue. The last celebration took place at the Coronet in March 2017 and was hosted by Abrantee with performances by Atumpan, Kojo Funds, Kwamz & Flava and many more.

In 2014, Abrantee debuted Afrobeats at Glastonbury, performing on the Silver Hayes Stage on the Sunday evening, and followed this set soon after with an appearance at the Essex Music Festival alongside Jhene Aiko and Wizkid. In 2015, Abrantee joined Fame Music as a head judge for the Afrobeats: Search for a Star TV show, created by his partner May7ven, Ice Prince and Mix Master Garzy to discover and develop some of the best unsigned Afrobeats acts from all of Africa. Abrantee is also the co-founder of the Annual Afrobeats Music Awards, launched in 2015, which has awarded Afrobeats artists Sarkodie, Maleekberry, JJC Skillz and African entertainment entrepreneur and DJ Abass Tijani in 2016. The award ceremony scheduled for November 2017 was rescheduled following Abrantee's absence due to illness.

On 5 December 2021, Abrantee made his first public TV appearance since recovering from a stroke when he presented The Best African Act at the MOBO Awards 2021 at the Coventry Arena.

== Charity ==
Abrantee Boateng has been involved with various charities and fundraising events across the United Kingdom including the African Caribbean Leukaemia Trust. In June 2009, he participated in the Daniel De Gale 10K Marrow Thon and ran to raise money for the ACLT. He has also hosted a number of their events. In June 2013, Boateng was part of the group of footballers and entertainers who travelled to Ghana for Michael Essien's Game of Hope in Accra for a charity football match and a charity event. On 17 April 2017, Abrantee supported and played at the Celebrity Charity Basketball Tournament to raise awareness and funds for the ACLT charity and Sickle Cell alongside Terrol Lewis, GuvnaB and other UK Entertainers.

In April 2018, Abrantee with his partner May7ven established the Abrantee Boateng Foundation (ABF Trust) dedicated to raising awareness, eliminating stigma, and raising funds to support survivors of stroke and their families. The overall objective of the Abrantee Boateng Foundation is to support families going through the life-threatening illness by offering emotional and practical support with rehabilitation in neurophysiotherapy, psychological therapy, cognitive behavioral therapy (CBT), speech and language therapy, specialist advanced equipment, treatment and medical project consultation that are over and above what the National Health Service provides.

== Awards and nominations ==
- Won : Best Entertainer of the Year at the Ghana Music Awards (2006)
- Won : Best DJ at the BEFFTA Awards (2009)
- Nominated : Best DJ at the African Music Awards (2009)
- Nominated : Best DJ at the BEFFTA Awards (2010)
- Won : Best DJ at the African Music Awards (2010)
- Nominated : Radio Personality of the Year at the BEFFTA Awards (2011)
- Won : Honorary Excellence Award at the BEFFTA Awards (2012)
- Nominated : Best DJ at the Urban Music Awards (2012)
- Nominated : Best Radio Show at the Urban Music Awards (2012)
- Nominated : Best Radio Show at the Urban Music Awards (2013)
- Winner : Best Radio Personality at the BEFFTA (2014)
- Nominee : Best Radio DJ at the Urban Music Awards (2014)
- Special Recognition Award : Outstanding Contribution to the Growth and Development of African Music at the African Pride Awards (2018)

== Discography ==
- Bring Me To Africa Mix Tape by Sway (2010)
- Afrobeats Mix Volume One Mix Tape by DJ Abrantee (2011)
- Afrobeats Ultimate Collection by DJ Abrantee (2013)
- Afrobeats The Definitive Collection by DJ Abrantee (2014)

== Film and television ==
- Footballers' Wives as Extra (2007)
- The Bill as Extra (2008)
- DJ Takeover MTV Base UK as Host (2008)
- Shit Happens as Best Friend (2009)
- The DJ Abrantee Show as himself (2010)
- The Abrantee Show as himself (2014)
- The Invisible Men as himself (2015)
