= ASIS =

ASIS may refer to:

== Anatomy ==
- Anterior superior iliac spine, a bony projection of the iliac bone

== Literature ==
- A Study in Scarlet, an 1887 mystery novel by Sir Arthur Conan Doyle featuring Sherlock Holmes

== Organizations ==
- Ada Semantic Interface Specification (ISO/IEC 15291)
- Africa Social Impact Summit
- Alam Shah Science School, a fully residential school in Malaysia
- The American Society for Industrial Security, a professional organization focused on the security industry, now known as ASIS International
- American Society for Information Science and Technology (ASIS&T), sometimes known as the American Society for Information Science (ASIS)
- Australian Secret Intelligence Service
- Avans School of International Studies, the business studies faculty of Avans University of Applied Sciences

== Technology ==
- Automatic Surface Inspection Systems, see Machine vision

== See also ==
- As is (disambiguation)
- Ashish, an Indian male given name
