= Razack Adeyemi Adeola =

Nigerian banker (born 1959)

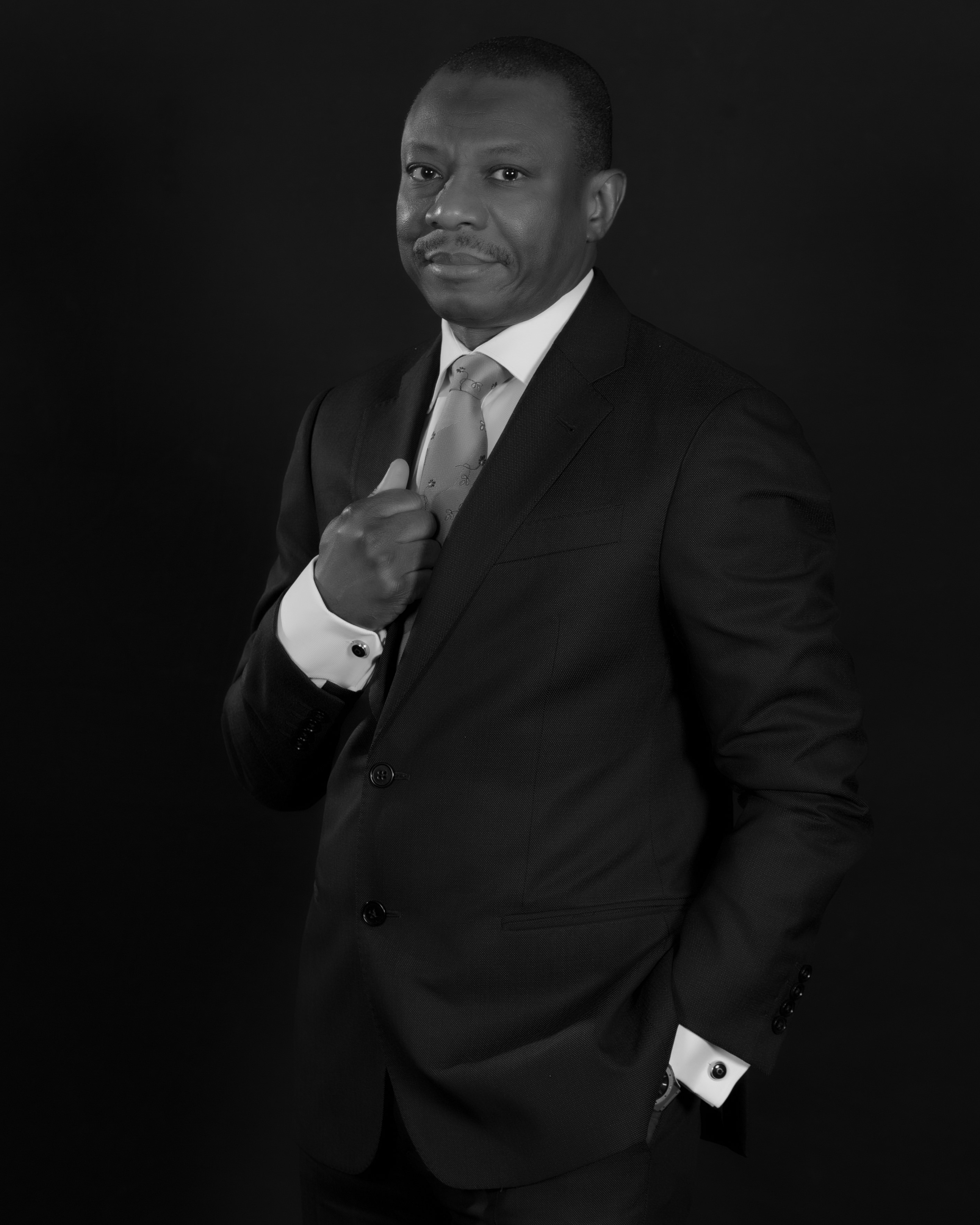
- Born: Razack Adeyemi Adeola; 30 January 1959 (age 67)
- Education: Obafemi Awolowo University; University of Lagos
- Occupations: Managing Director / CEO; Sterling Bank (Nigeria)

Razack Adeyemi Adeola (born January 30, 1959) is a Nigerian banker notable for winning the 2014 Business Day (Nigeria) Outstanding CEO Award and the 2015 The Sun (Nigeria) Banker of the Year.

== Early life ==
Adeola's tertiary education was at Obafemi Awolowo University where he graduated with a law degree in 1982. In 1983, he was called to the Nigerian Bar. He later went to the University of Lagos where he enrolled as a postgraduate student for a law degree and specialized in the Law of Secured Credit, Comparative Company Law and International Economic Law.
