= Gafacci =

Ghanaian music producer, DJ, and songwriter

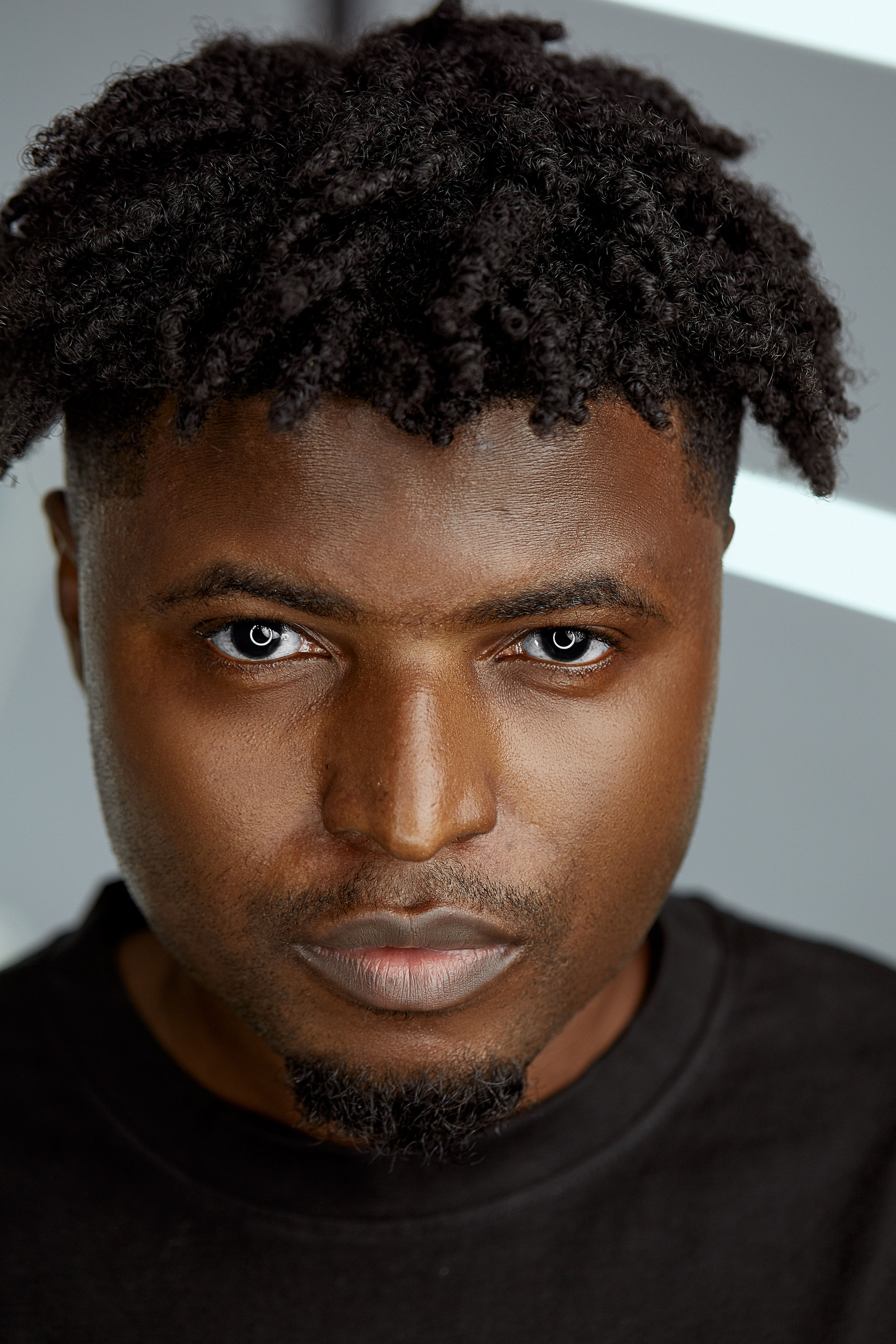

Background information
- Birth name: Michael Dela Gafatchi
- Born: Accra, Ghana
- Genres: Electronic; Afrobeats; Hip hop
- Occupation(s): Disc Jockey, Producer, Songwriter
- Instrument(s): Keyboard, Flstudio, Ableton, Akai Apc
- Years active: 2009–present

Michael Dela Gafatchi, better known by the stage name Gafacci, is a Ghanaian music producer, disc jockey, and songwriter.

== Early life ==
Gafacci attended Accra Academy for his senior high school education. He developed his interest for music in High School. In September 2009, Gafacci got introduced to beatmaking by a friend. He has production credits for Sarkodie, D-Black, Ice Prince and others.

== Production career ==
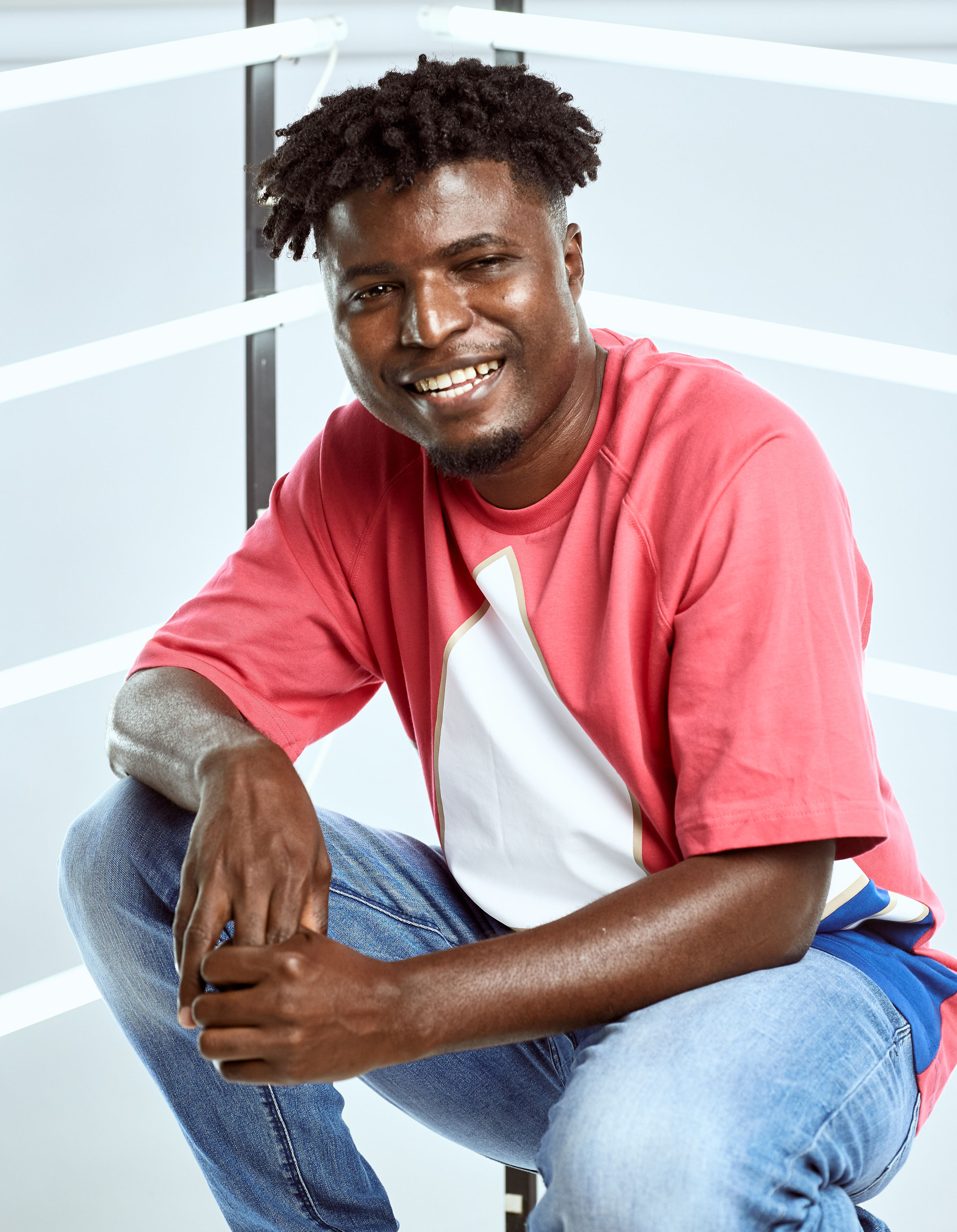
Gafacci-1

He produced BET Cypher Ghana 2010 featuring artists like Tinny, Sarkodie, Edem, Kweku T, Reggie Rockstone, and Baby G. He has worked with so many artists in and outside Ghana. He produced/composed and co-wrote Dee-Moneey's hit single "Kpokpo O Body". Gafacci started JOWAA project with French-American Dj Bbrave. Since then he has graced stages as jowaa at ABC Festival (Burkina Faso), Chale Wote Street Art Festival (Ghana), Sabolai Festival (Ghana), Asabaako Festival (Ghana), Nyege Nyege Festival (Uganda), Oslo World Music Festival (Norway) and toured Europe in 2017.

== Production Discography ==
2022	Moliy	"Banana"	Gafacci
2011	Dee Moneey	"Kpokpo O Body"	Gafacci
2011	DBlack feat Sarkodie	"My Kinda Girl"	Gafacci
