= Ben Akabueze =

Nigerian economist

Director General of the Budget Office of the Federation, Federal Republic of Nigeria
- In office 2016–2024
- Preceded by: Tijjani Mohammed Abdullahi
- Succeeded by: Tanimu Yakubu Kurfi

Commissioner for Economic Planning and Budget for Lagos State
- In office 2007–2015

Personal details
- Education: University of Lagos Lagos Business School Harvard Kennedy School
- Occupation: Chartered Accountant

Ben Akabueze is a Nigerian chartered accountant and the former Director General of the Budget Office of the Federation, Nigeria. He was the CEO of NAL Bank Plc (now Sterling Bank Plc) and was for over two terms Commissioner for Economic Planning and Budget with the Lagos State Government.

== Early life ==
Akabueze obtained a B.Sc in Accounting from the University of Lagos and a postgraduate certificate in Management from the Lagos Business School. He also holds a certificate in economic development from the Harvard Kennedy School, US. He is the Pastor-in-charge of Lagos Province 35 of the Redeemed Christian Church of God and is married to Ngozi, the Head of Foundations of Sapphires (a non profit organisation)

== Career ==
Akabueze was appointed the Chief Executive Officer of NAL Bank Plc in 2000 a post he retained till its merger in December 2005 to become Sterling Bank Plc, at which he was Executive Director. He was thereafter in January 2007 appointed as the Commissioner for Economic Planning and Budget by the Lagos State Government, a position he held till May 2015. In February 2016 he was appointed as Special Adviser to the President on National Planning and was made the Director General of Budget Office in June. On 17 May 2020, President Muhammadu Buhari reappointed Akabueze as the Director General of Budget Office. He is a Fellow of the Institute of Chartered Accountants of Nigeria (ICAN), the Institute of Credit Administration (FCA), and the Chartered Institute of Bankers (FCIBN)

Akabueze is also the head pastor of The King's Court Parish of the Redeemed Christian Church of God (RCCG).

=== Public speaking ===
As the Director General of Nigeria's Budget Office he has engaged in public speaking at several events, including the Lagos Business School breakfast club, where he spoke on budget and national strategy; leverage and synergy potentials; KPMG's Nigeria Tax Breakfast seminar, where he made a presentation on key objectives and expected impact of the FGN 2021 Budget, making a case for the need for increased domestic revenue by state governments; and other events, where he continues to advocate for increased domestic revenue generation and more efficient management of allocated revenue.

== Legal issues ==
In October 2022, a retired staff of the Budget Office of the Federation, Bilkisu Sannusi accused Akabueze, of abuse of power in a suit filed at the National Industrial Court of Nigeria. She alleged that Akabueze, the Director-General of the Budget Office of the Federation, in collaboration with officials of the Finance Ministry and the Head of Service of the Federation had removed her name from payment vouchers, due to her refusal to compromise on the manipulation of budget proposals by Ministries, Departments and Agencies (MDA).
