= Sulaiman Adebola Adegunwa =

Philanthropist and business person from Ososa Ogun State Nigeria

Sulaiman Adebola Adegunwa OON
- Occupations: Businessman, philanthropist
- Known for: Founding Rite Foods Limited; Former chairman of Sterling Bank
- Title: Founder and CEO of Essay Holdings Limited
- Awards: Officer of the Order of the Niger (2006)

Sulaiman Adebola Adegunwa OFR, is a Nigerian businessman, philanthropist, and former chairman of Sterling Bank Plc. He is the founder and chief executive officer of Essay Holdings Limited; Parent Company of Rite Foods Limited. He is a member of the Board of directors of Thai Farm International Limited, a Nigeria-based company that focus on the production and processing of cassava. He is the founder of Sulaimon College of Education, Ososa, Ogun State, Nigeria.

== Career ==
Adegunwa hold doctorate degree honoris causa from the Lagos State University and Olabisi Onabanjo University. On 22 December 2005, he was appointed the executive director of Sterling Bank Plc, a position he held until July 2014. In 2006, he was conferred with a national honor of the Officer of the order of Nigeria(OON) by chief Olusegun Obasanjo the former President of Nigeria.
