= As is (disambiguation) =

When an item is bought as is, it is bought in its present state. The term may also refer to:

- As/Is, a 2004 live album by John Mayer
- As Is (play), by William M. Hoffman
- As Is (film), adaptation directed by Michael Lindsay-Hogg
- As Is (Nitzer Ebb EP)
- As Is (The Bicycles EP)
- As Is (album), an album by Manfred Mann

== See also ==
- ASIS (disambiguation)
- Aziz (disambiguation)
