= Afrobeats =

Umbrella term for contemporary West African pop music, distinct from Afrobeat

- Stylistic origins: Afrobeat; dancehall; fuji; hiplife; highlife; kpanlogo; hip-hop; jùjú; ndombolo; palm-wine; R&B; soca; house
- Cultural origins: 2000s Ghana, Nigeria, United Kingdom
- Derivative forms: Afroswing; Bakosó; Afro trap

Subgenres
- Azonto; Banku music; Pon pon

Fusion genres
- Afropiano; Afrosoca; Afroswing; Afro trap; Alté; Bakosó

Other topics
- Afropop; Afro fusion; Bongo flava; Nigerian hip-hop; Ghanaian hip-hop; Gqom; UK funky; Zouk

Afrobeats, not to be confused with Afrobeat or Afroswing, is an umbrella term to describe popular music from West Africa and the diaspora that initially developed in Nigeria, Ghana, and the UK in the 2000s and 2010s. Afrobeats is less of a style per se, and more of a descriptor for the fusion of sounds flowing out of Nigeria and Ghana. Genres such as hiplife, jùjú music, highlife, azonto music, and Naija beats, among others, were amalgamated under the "Afrobeats" umbrella.

Afrobeats is primarily produced in Lagos, Accra, and London. Historian and cultural critic Paul Gilroy reflects on the changing London music scene as a result of shifting demographics:

We are moving towards an African majority which is diverse both in its cultural habits and in its relationship to colonial and postcolonial governance, so the shift away from Caribbean dominance needs to be placed in that setting. Most of the grime folks are African kids, either the children of migrants or migrants themselves. It's not clear what Africa might mean to them.

In his earlier book, The Black Atlantic, Gilroy rejects the notion that Black culture and music can be bound to one geographical region. Afrobeats exemplifies this syncretism as a transnational genre that since 2019 has received international attention. David Drake writes about popular Nigerian music noting it is "Picking up on trends from the U.S., Jamaica, and Trinidad, they reimagine diasporic influences and—more often than not—completely reinvent them."

Afrobeats began to experience widespread global mainstream acclaim in the late 2010s, with artists achieving success across Africa, Europe, and North America. Between 2017 and 2022, Afrobeats experienced a 550% growth in streams on Spotify. In response, it has been referred to as one of Africa's 'biggest cultural' or 'musical' exports.

== Characteristics ==
Afrobeats (with the s) is commonly conflated with and referred to as Afrobeat (without the s); however, these two are distinct, sound differently and are not the same.

Afrobeat is a genre that developed in the 1960s and 1970s, taking influences from Fuji music and highlife, mixed in with American jazz and funk. Characteristics of Afrobeat include big bands, long instrumental solos, and complex jazzy rhythms. The name was coined by Nigerian afrobeat pioneer Fela Kuti. Fela Kuti and his longtime partner, drummer Tony Allen, are often credited for laying the groundwork for what would become afrobeats.

This is in contrast to the Afrobeats sound, pioneered in the 2000s and 2010s. While afrobeats takes on influences from afrobeat, it is a diverse fusion of various different genres such as British house music, hiplife, hip-hop, dancehall, soca, jùjú music, highlife, R&B, ndombolo, Naija beats, Azonto, and palm-wine music. Unlike Afrobeat, which is a clearly defined genre, afrobeats is more of an overarching term for contemporary West African pop music. The term was created in order to package these various sounds into a more easily accessible label, which were unfamiliar to the UK listeners where the term was first coined. Another, more subtle contrast between the two sounds, is that while Fela Kuti used his music to discuss and criticise contemporary politics, afrobeats typically avoids such topics, thereby making it less politically charged than afrobeat.

Afrobeats is most identifiable by its signature driving drum beat rhythms, whether electronic or instrumental. These beats harken to the stylings of a variety of traditional African drum beats across West Africa as well as the precursory genre Afrobeat. The beat in Afrobeats music is not just a base for the melody, but acts as a major character of the song, taking a lead role that is sometimes equal to or of greater importance than the lyrics and almost always more central than the other instrumentals. Afrobeats shares a similar momentum and tempo to house music. Usually using the 4/4 time signature common in Western music, afrobeats commonly features a 3–2 or 2–3 rhythm called a clave.

Another distinction within Afrobeats is the notably West African, specifically Nigerian or Ghanaian, accented English that is often blended with local slangs, pidgin English, as well as local Nigerian or Ghanaian languages depending on the backgrounds of the performers.

Sampling is sometimes used within Afrobeats music. Burna Boy and Wizkid, for example, have both sampled Fela Kuti.

== Name ==
London-based DJ Abrantee was credited by The Guardian for coining the name "Afrobeats", adding an "s" to Afrobeat, in order to package and present the sound to British dancefloors. DJ Abrantee stated:

I cannot say I invented Afrobeats. Afrobeats was invented before I was born. It was invented by Fela Kuti. But what you've got to remember is the genre of music artists themselves are now producing — the likes of Wizkid, Ice Prince, P-Square, Castro, May7ven are calling their music Afrobeats. So that's what I call it when I put them on my mix tapes.

Afrobeats is less of a style like Afrobeat is, and more of an overarching term for the contemporary sound of African pop music and that of those influenced by it. DJ 3K criticised the label for being a contemporary marketing category. According to David Drake, the eclectic genre "reimagines diasporic influences and—more often than not—completely reinvents them". However, some caution against equating Afrobeats to contemporary pan-African music, in order to prevent the erasure of local musical contributions. Some artists have distanced themselves from the term 'afrobeats' due to the overt similarity it has with 'afrobeat', even though they are different sounds.

Afrobeats is also sometimes referred to as Afro-pop and Afro-fusion. A few artists have used the same alternative names to describe their music; Don Jazzy has stated he prefers "Afro-pop" rather than Afrobeats. Wizkid, Burna Boy, and Davido all use Afro-fusion or Afro-pop to describe their music. Mr Eazi also refers to his music as 'banku music' to denote the influence Ghana has had on his music (banku is a Ghanaian dish). Rema coined the term "Afrorave", which is a subgenre of Afrobeats with influences of Arabian and Indian music.

Yeni Kuti, daughter of Fela Kuti, expressed distaste for the name 'Afrobeats' and instead preferred if people referred to it as "Nigerian pop", "Naija Afropop", or "Nigerian Afropop". Similarly, Seun Kuti, the youngest son of Fela Kuti, has maintained that the music made by Dbanj and P-Square should be classified as Afropop. In defence, he said, "You cannot just call some pop music Afrobeat just because it's coming from Africa...". Music critic Osagie Alonge criticised the pluralisation of 'afrobeat'. Sam Onyemelukwe of Trace Nigeria, a television show, however noted that he liked 'afrobeats', noting that it acknowledges the foundation set by afrobeat while also recognising that it's a different and unique sound. Nigerian artist Burna Boy has stated that he does not want his music referred to as afrobeats. However, most of these monikers, including afrobeats, have been criticised for using the 'afro' prefix, presenting Africa as a monolithic entity, rather than one with diverse cultures and sounds.

Reggie Rockstone, a pioneering hiplife artist, felt conflicted over artists in an interview with Gabriel Myers Hansen:

It's like 'Oh come on! We work so hard for you to get on, and now you're gonna deny what it is that we did? Come on!' Sometimes I get that vibe, but then, in the same breath, I'm like, well, it is one Africa, and I'm pan-African to the bone. So do I really care if it's called Afrobeats or hiplife? As long as Black people are getting it, and young people are making money, feeding their kids, I think I'm okay. So, to each their own.

Rockstone used "afrobeats" rather than "hiplife"—a genre often placed under the "Afrobeats" umbrella.

== History ==
=== Beginnings ===
Styles of music that make up afrobeats largely began sometime in the late '90s and early to mid-2000s. With the launching of MTV Base Africa in 2005, West Africa was given a large platform through which artists could grow. Artists such as MI Abaga, Naeto C and Sarkodie were among the first to take advantage of this, however most of the artists were merely making interpretations of American hip-hop and R&B. Prior to this, groups such as Trybesmen, Plantashun Boiz, and the Remedies were early pioneers that fused modern American influences from hip-hop and R&B with local melodies. While this allowed them to build local audiences, it blocked them from a wider platform due to the language barriers in-place. P-Square released their album Game Over in 2007, which was unique for its usage of Nigerian rhythms and melodies. Meanwhile, artists such as Flavour N'abania embraced older genres, such as highlife, and remixing it into something more modern, as seen in his song "Nwa Baby (Ashawo Remix)". As the decade progressed, increasing access to digital video tools, social media and streamingly platforms allowed musicians to present themselves professionally and directly reach international audiences. By the late 2000s, artists within the burgeoning scene were beginning to become stars across the continent.

However it was not until the launch of Choice FM's new Afrobeats radio show birthed and presented by DJ Abrantee in April 2011 that the genre gained traction and saw 'Afrobeats' trending for the first time in history. The launch of the show gained popularity and provided a launch pad for both UK based and African artists to submit songs for playlist consideration. Abrantee used his daytime show to test daytime play of Afrobeats. Some of the first Afrobeats songs to be playlisted on daytime radio across the UK were Mista Silva's "Boom Boom Tah", May7ven's "Ten Ten", D'Banj's "Oliver Twist", and Moelogo's "Pangolo" in March 2012. P-Square released "Chop My Money (Remix)" alongside popular Senegalese-American artist Akon in 2012. "Oliver Twist", released online by Nigerian artist D'banj in the summer of 2011 charted at number 9 on the UK Singles Chart in 2012 (making him the first afrobeats artist to make it to the top 10 in the UK) and number 2 on the UK R&B Chart. In 2012, P-Square remixed their 2009 hit single "E No Easy" with Matt Houston, and it became the first afrobeats song to reach top 5 on the French SNEP music chart, as well as top 10 on the Belgian Ultratop chart, spending 29 weeks and 16 weeks respectively. The song was the first afrobeats summer hit in France, which in turn boosted afrobeats' visibility in the francophone countries. Mr Eazi later credited D'banj in an interview with Sway in the Morning in 2019 for helping encourage Nigerians to embrace their accents and music, rather than looking outwards and trying to emulate American accents and music. British DJs such as DJ Edu, with his show Destination Africa on BBC Radio 1Xtra, and DJ Abrantee, with his show on Choice FM, granted African music a platform in the United Kingdom. DJ Abrantee has been credited for coining the name "afrobeats". DJ Abrantee launched his Afrobeats charts on Capital Xtra in 2014. DJs and producers like DJ Black, Elom Adablah, and C-Real, were also crucial in spreading afrobeats, often giving songs a burst of popularity after being played on their shows.

=== Azonto and dance crazes ===
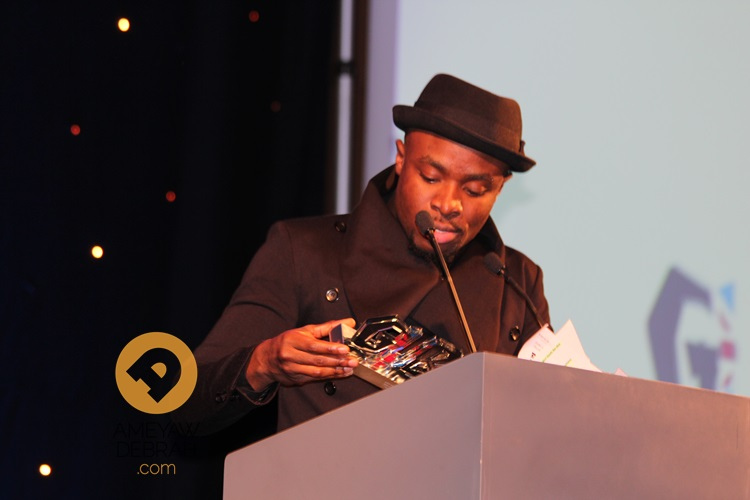
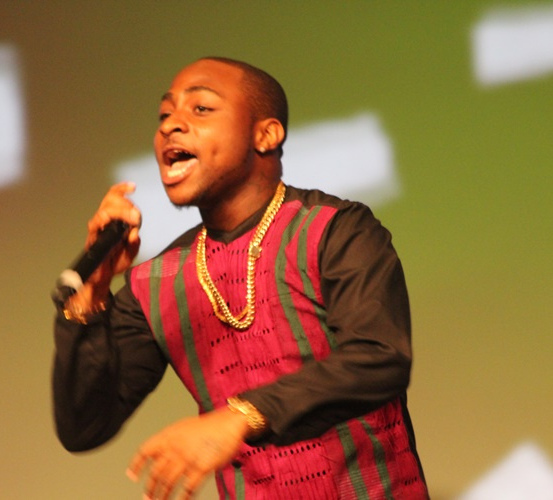
Fuse ODG (top) and Davido (bottom)

Ghanaian British artist Fuse ODG helped popularise afrobeats in the UK. He was also the first to top the iTunes World Chart and received the Best African Act award at the 2013 MOBO Awards. In 2009, Fuse ODG described his sound as "hip hop with an African vibe". In 2011, Fuse ODG travelled to Ghana where he discovered the Azonto dance, and became inspired by hip-hop-influenced Afro-pop and Naija beats. Once he returned to London, he fused the sounds he had found in Ghana into what he described as "Afrobeats, but with my U.K. thing added to it", fusing the sound with influences from UK funky and grime. In 2012, he saw his first success with the song "Antenna" which peaked at number 7 on the UK Singles Chart. He followed that up with "Azonto", which further helped popularise afrobeats and the dance in the UK. Such songs, and the Azonto dance craze, helped encourage Black Brits to embrace their African heritage rather than, as was the norm before, attempting to fit into British-Caribbean communities. Afrobeats night clubs became primary features of UK's nightlife with clubs opening in most major cities.

More viral dances would follow which played an important part in popularising afrobeats. In 2011, Nigerian singer Iyanya released "Kukere". The song became popular and known for its adaption of a traditional dance called Etighi. Another dance was popularised by Nigerian artist Davido when he released "Skelewu" in 2013. Davido promoted the song by uploading an instructional dance video of it onto YouTube on 18 August 2013. The video was directed by Jassy Generation. The release of the instructional video accompany the announcement of the Skelewu dance competition. In order to win the competition, participants were told to watch the instructional dance video and upload videos of themselves dancing to the song. According to Pulse Nigeria, the number of dance videos uploaded to YouTube by fans aggregated to over 100,000 views.

Other British afrobeats artists also emerged around 2012–2013, such as Mista Silva, Vibe Squad, Weray Ent, Naira Marley, Kwamz, Flava, Moelogo, and Timbo, who collectively set the foundation for future UK afrobeats and its derivative genre, Afroswing. Mista Silva's songs "Bo Won Sem Ma Me" and "Boom Boom Tah" were notable early hits in the UK afrobeats scene. Mista Silva and Skob credited Fuse ODG's "Azonto" song for encouraging them to create afrobeats.

Ghanaian artist Guru also popularised his own dance in 2013 called "Alkayida" with the release of the song "Alkayida (Boys Abrɛ)". Nigerian artist MC Galaxy also popularised a dance called "Sekem".

"Shekini", off of P-Square's "Double Trouble" album (released in 2014), played a role in increasing the visibility of afrobeats in the Middle East and North Africa. The song influenced a lot of recordings and parodies in the Arab World, notably from acts like Arash and Black Cats.

Another method of utilising social media in order to boost a song was seen in the promotion of "Dorobucci", released in 2014, wherein Don Jazzy encouraged people to record themselves singing the song prior to release. The song won Best Pop Single at The Headies 2014, and Song of the Year at the 2015 MTV Africa Music Awards. It gained over 20 million views by 2016.

Ghanaian artist Sarkodie won Best International Act Africa at the MOBO Awards in 2012, and Best Hip Hop award at the 2014 MTV Africa Awards. In 2011, his song "U Go Kill Me" became a hit in Ghana and helped popularise the Azonto dance craze.

=== Mid-2010s ===
American artists such as Michelle Williams, French Montana, Rick Ross, and Kanye West have all collaborated with Afrobeats artists. Michelle Williams released "Say Yes" in 2014, a gospel song based on the Nigerian hymn When Jesus Say Yes. The song's beats are said to resemble the popular four-beat of house music, but in fact follows the 3–2 or 2–3 of Afrobeats. This beat is known as the clave and mixes a rhythm with a normal 4/4 beat, it is commonly seen in many forms West African music. Another notable hit was "Million Pound Girl (Badder Than Bad)" by Fuse ODG, which reached 5 on the UK Singles Chart in 2014.

In 2014, a genre derivative of afrobeats known as afroswing emerged in the UK, which fused the sound with influences from road rap, grime, dancehall, trap, and R&B. The genre was popularised by J Hus. This has led to many people referring to afroswing as 'afrobeats', however the two genres are distinct from each other.

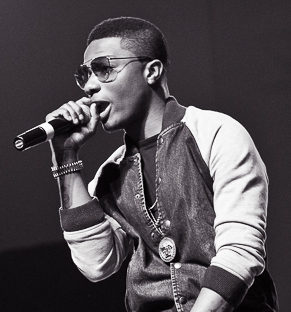
Nigerian musician Wizkid

Canadian artist Drake also began to experiment with afrobeats in the mid-2010s, which arguably helped afrobeats gain international mainstream appeal. In 2014, he featured on "Ojuelegba (Remix)" by Nigerian artist Wizkid alongside British MC Skepta, and in 2016 when he released "One Dance" alongside British singer Kyla and Wizkid. "One Dance" became Spotify's most streamed song, with over a billion streams, and was number 1 in 15 countries. Drake's 2017 album More Life contains many Afrobeats and Dancehall influences. In 2017, Wizkid signed to RCA Records, which became the biggest ever deal an African musician has ever received. Wizkid and Drake have both been credited in helping popularise Afrobeats worldwide. "One Dance" has been credited with helping push afrobeats into worldwide mainstream appeal, which would only continue the rise within the following years. Wizkid was later entered into the Guinness Book of Records 2018 for featuring on the most streamed Spotify single of all time, "One Dance". He is the first afrobeats artist to enter the Guinness Book of Records.

Nigerian artist Mr Eazi began to gain popularity in 2016 with his breakout singles "Skin Tight" and "Bankulize", both produced by British-Ghanaian producer Juls. He won Best New Artist at the Soundcity MVP Awards Festival in 2016. Mr Eazi initially gained his popularity in the UK after Juls reached out to him resulting in the song "Bankulize". Mr Eazi soon after became a star in Ghana and Nigeria. He has stated UK, Ghanaian and Nigerian music have all influenced his music. Mr Eazi calls his music 'Banku Music'. He was the first African pop artist to gain an extensive Apple Music artist page.

In 2016, Beat FM in North London became the first British radio station dedicated to afrobeats.

Nigerian artist Tekno signed a multi-million dollar deal with Columbia Records. In August 2017, he released "Pana". The song was a hit in Nigeria, but failed to propel Tekno's career into America as was hoped. On October 1, 2017, Wizkid became the first African artist to hold a sold-out headline show at the Royal Albert Hall.

2017 also saw the rise of Shaku Shaku, another dance craze. Though the origins are not known, the dance is believed to have been popularized by street urchins in Agege around mid-2017. The Shaku Shaku dance move first appeared in Olamide's "Wo" music video. Much like the Azonto dance, Shaku Shaku also gave rise to its own genre of music, pioneered by artists such as Mr Real, Slimcase, Idowest.

=== Late-2010s ===
In the late 2010s, international record labels Universal and Warner Music began to invest money into Afrobeats artists.

In 2018, French-Malian singer Aya Nakamura released "Djadja". The song became a number 1 hit in France and the Netherlands, as well as becoming certified gold in Belgium and Switzerland. The song gained over 400 million views on YouTube. She became the first French artist to secure seven top 10 songs in the French Singles chart and the first French singer to gain a number 1 album in the Netherlands since Edith Piaf in 1967, and became the most streamed French female artist in the world. Her sophomore album Nakamura became certified gold in France. Her rise has been notable due to the relative difficulty French black women have had in gaining mainstream popularity in France.

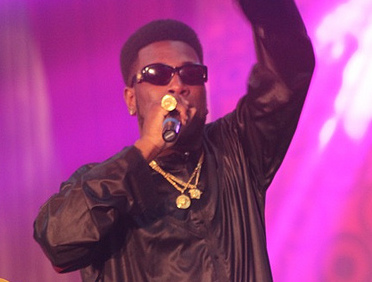
Nigerian musician Burna Boy

In June 2018, prominent American rapper Kanye West released his album titled Ye. Fans of Kanye West that searched for his album also, unintentionally, came across Burna Boy's song called "Ye" (released in January). This led to a 200% spike in streams for Burna Boy, gaining over 11.2 million streams in the United States. By the late 2010s, Burna Boy emerged as the leading figure in Afrobeats, selling out stadiums in both the U.K and U.S., having a number one album on the UK Album Chart, amassing ten Grammy nominations and becoming the most streamed African artist, all of which was the first by an African artist.

In August 2019, Mr Eazi launched emPawa Africa, a talent incubation initiative to nurture and support up-and-coming artistes in Africa. The platform will be used to help promote upcoming artists and give them a major platform. The initiative is also supported by YouTube Music.

The latter half of the 2010s also saw prominent American artists experiment with Afrobeats music. This is notable due to the difficulty Afrobeats has previously had in accessing the American market. In 2016, Nigerian Popstar Ayo Jay enlisted the help of American artists Chris Brown and Fetty Wap to release a remix to his single "Your Number". In 2017, Wizkid linked up with Chris Brown for a single titled "African Bad Gyal." In 2018, Swae Lee and Drake released "Won't Be Late", produced by Nigerian artist Tekno. In 2019, Janet Jackson released "Made for Now" with production by Harmony Samuels. The song was afrobeats, and became a top 10 hit on Adult R&B radio. In 2019 two prominent American artists, GoldLink and Beyoncé, both released albums with afrobeats influence. GoldLink released Diaspora on June 12, 2019, featuring an afrobeats song as the lead single, "Zulu Screams" and production from P2J. GoldLink had also previously made "No Lie" alongside Wizkid back in 2014. Beyoncé released The Lion King: The Gift, coinciding with the release of Lion King film released by Disney, on July 19, 2019. The album featured artists such as Burna Boy, Mr Eazi, Wizkid, P2J, Yemi Alade, Maleek Berry, Tiwa Savage, and Shatta Wale. Mr Eazi and GuiltyBeatz predicted the album would help afrobeats reach a higher level of popularity, especially in the US, than it has yet to achieve. In July 2019, Yemi Alade's "Johnny" set the record for the most viewed female African music video on YouTube which made her the second artist with the most views on a single video after Davido. In July 2019, Davido and Chris Brown released a music video for their collaboration "Blow My Mind", which at the time became the first video by a Nigerian artist to amass 2 million YouTube views within the first 24 hours of release. Afrobeats artist Rema was the first Nigerian musician to land a song on former US president Barack Obama's yearly summer music playlist. On August 23, 2019, Jidenna released the afrobeats album 85 to Africa. On October 1, Chris Brown released "Lower Body", an afrobeats single featuring Davido. On October 25, 2019, Akon released a new afrobeats album titled Akonda.

The rising attention of afrobeats in the US also reached music radio stations, which began airing afrobeats, something they typically would not do before. Davido's "Fall" became a top 20 radio hit in America, 24 months after it was initially released. "Fall" also began rising on the Billboard R&B/Hip-Hop Airplay and U.S. Shazam charts, also becoming the longest charting Nigerian song in Billboard history. The song later became certified Gold in Canada and the U.S. Nigerian artist Burna Boy also saw some success, performing to over 9,000 people in Brooklyn, and gaining over 11.2 million streams from the US on his single "Ye". His album African Giant was nominated for 'Best World Music Album' at the Grammy Awards. Wizkid's "Come Closer" became certified RIAA Gold in 2020, 3 years after initial release. His song "Soco" also received a Canadian Gold certification in 2020. Despite gaining popularity in the US there stands some contention between the African American community and the greater African Diaspora. Afrobeats has been treated as an "other" category at BET awards despite being a black genre. These awards are catered toward Black Americans highlighting their lack of solidarity the diaspora says Boima Tucker. Afrobeats artists are tired of being treated like "second class citizens" in African-American Music award shows in the United States. In December 2019, YouTube announced it would be supporting four afrobeats artists: Kizz Daniel, Reekado Banks, Simi, and Teni. Announced at an event titled "A celebration of Afrobeats" hosted in Lagos, Nigeria, YouTube stated it would be providing them with tools to "propel their music, grow their presence on YouTube and accelerate the growth of their audience globally".

=== 2020s ===
In July 2020, the British Official Charts Company announced it would be creating an 'Official UK Afrobeats Chart' to track the sales and streaming data of afrobeats songs in the UK. In the year prior, afrobeats artists had spent a collective 86 weeks on the Official Chart Top 40, compared to 24 in 2017, and the amount of afrobeats artists in the UK Top 40 had doubled in that period. (Note: This is also including Afroswing artists and songs.) The company claimed it was one of the 'world's first official charts' for afrobeats music.

During the Nigerian End SARS protests in October, Davido's song "Fem" was described as a 'protest song' for the movement. The song was prominently played outside the government secretariat in Lagos, to protest and drown out the Lagos governor who was attempting to speak to the protestors. The Burna Boy song "20 10 20" was created in response to the Lekki Massacre perpetrated by SARS on 20/10/20, where the police forces killed 12 protestors at the Lekki Toll Gate. Lyrics of the song include "Twentieth of October 2020 / You carry army go kill many youth for Lekki / Na so water o, water runaway my eye / Nothing you go talk wey go justify the case of their murder." The political nature of these songs highlights how Afrobeats has been used as a political tool to express community distress and gain awareness for issues facing contemporary Africa, particularly Nigeria.

In April 2021, Davido's song "Fall" became the first Nigerian afrobeats song to receive over 200 million views on YouTube. In the same year, Wizkid and Tems became the first Nigerian pop artists to earn a spot on the Billboard Hot 100 with their song "Essence", while Burna Boy became the first African artist to earn 100 million streams across three albums each on Spotify.

A range of new artists, such as Rema, Fireboy DML, Tems, Joeboy, and Ayra Starr began to gain widespread popularity around the early 2020s, with a defining sound of R&B-infused, and sometimes trap-influenced, afrobeats music. In January 2022, Fireboy DML was the first Nigerian artist to reach the number two position on the UK Singles Chart with his "Peru" remix featuring Ed Sheeran. In addition, artists such as Sarz and Niniola incorporated house influences into their music (on songs such as "Ibadi" and "Shaba"). This style of music has sometimes been dubbed 'afro-house', denoting the fusion of afrobeats and house music.

In September 2021, Ckay became the second Nigerian pop artist to debut on the Billboard Hot 100 with his song "Love Nwantiti" which peaked at number one in India, the Netherlands, Norway and Switzerland, and gained popularity across TikTok. CKay personally dubbed his sound 'Emo-afrobeats', noting the additional focus on emotional and romantic-focused lyricism in his music. In the same month Wizkid's "Essence" became the first African song to be certified platinum and to reach the top ten of the Billboard Hot 100.

In March 2022, the United States Billboard announced it would be creating an 'Official U.S. Afrobeats Songs Chart' to track the sales and streaming data of afrobeat songs in the U.S. In the year prior, Wizkid had spent a collective 27 weeks on the radio domination Chart with Essence, after which Kodak Black's "Super Gremlin" claimed the number one spot. Currently, the genre has yielded some of the biggest success stories of the young decade — including songs like Wizkid's "Essence" featuring Tems, CKay's "Love Nwantiti (Ah Ah Ah)" and Fireboy DML's "Peru". In August 2023, Burna Boy's seventh Studio album, I Told Them debuted at number one on the UK Album Chart, the first ever by an African artist. Rema released his debut album Raves & Roses in March 2022 and by 2023 the lead single "Calm Down" went viral with its remix featuring Selena Gomez reaching number three on the Billboard Hot 100 and reached a record of more than a billion streams on Spotify. Billboard referred to the song as "Afrobeats biggest cross over hit."

In 2023, Spotify organized five local workshop and media events within African cities, under the initiative of promoting Afrobeats acts. Later that year, Tyla became the first South African artist to debut on the Billboard Hot 100 in 55 years, with her single "Water" which contains Afrobeats influences.

The 2023 NBA All-Star Game halftime show was headlined by Afrobeats artists Burna Boy, Tems and Rema in Salt Lake City, Utah. The three artists became the first African artists to headline a major U.S. sports halftime show.

In 2024 Burna Boy became the first afrobeats artist to perform at the Grammy Awards. In the same year as a result of the international impact of afrobeats the Grammy Awards introduced a category for the Best African Music Performance afrobeats stars such as Asake and Olamide, Burna Boy, Davido, Ayra Starr would be nominated for the award, with Tyla taking home the golden gramophone for the category.

2024 to 2025 saw a significant increase of women in the genre breaking records and gaining success like never before singers such as Ayra Starr lead Spotify's most streamed female artist in Nigeria. She become the most streamed female artist in 3 countries and the most streamed nigerian artist in Latin America. In 2025 the singer Moliy would be crowned hit maker of the year by Billboard and Tems would go on to win the Grammy Award for Best African Music Performance in 2025 earning a commendation from the Nigerian president on the achievement. Tems also went on to win the 2024 BET Award for Dr. Bobby Jones Best Gospel/Inspirational Award, as of march 2026 Tems would go on to become the most streamed african artist.

According to a study published by Spotify, the average tempo of Afrobeats songs in 2015 was 119 BPM. Over the following decade, that average tempo has decreased to 114 BPM in 2025. During that period, very successful low-tempo songs have been released. This includes tracks like "Calm Down” by Rema, which has a tempo of 107 BPM, and “Rush” by Ayra Starr, which has a tempo of 100 BPM.

== Subgenres ==
=== Afro-Adura ===
Afro-Adura, also known as Afro-Trenches, is a subgenre of afrobeats with a lyrical focus on spirituality and uplifting messages that emerged in 2022, while also containing references to the harsh realities of street life and escaping poverty. Afro-adura production styles are 'energetic' and 'melancholic', while lyrics are often sung in the Yoruba language. The name is a portmanteau of "afro" (from afrobeats) and "adura" (meaning "prayer" in Yoruba). In January 2023, Boomplay launched an official afro-adura playlist, describing the genre as "music for the street by the street with the major element being the introspective and motivational lyrics".

Artists associated with the genre include Seyi Vibez, Tope Alabi, 9ice, Oritse Femi, Jaywon, Dotman, Barry Jhay, Bella Shmurda, Zinoleesky, MohBad, Asake, T.I Blaze, Magicsticks.

Afro-adura has alternatively been referred to as a subgenre of street-hop, or even as a synonym for street-hop. Seyi Vibez personally stated he was not aware of the term, and it has been criticised as an unnecessary 'branding exercise'.

=== Azonto ===
The Azonto is a Ghanaian dance and music genre. Although the origins of the dance are unclear, Ghanaian artist Sarkodie helped popularise the dance with his 2011 song "U Go Kill Me", produced by EL and Krynkman, which became a hit in Ghana. This wasn't the first Azonto song however. Azonto music first emerged sometime in 2010, with songs such as "Kpo Kpo Body" by Gafacci and "I Like Your Girlfriend" by Bryte and Gafacci being among the first to showcase the new style. The dance craze that followed, in turn, created a subgenre of afrobeats specifically dedicated to the dance, utilising simplistic, faster, and easier to dance to rhythms and simple, memorable hooks. In 2011, Fuse ODG traveled to Ghana where he discovered the Azonto dance. Once he returned to London, he realised nobody knew what the dance was, and so he made the song "Azonto", which further catapulted the dance's popularity globally and in the UK. This was also the first time afrobeats was being played on daytime British radio. The song was followed up by another Azonto song, "Antenna".

In 2013, Bronx-based rapper 2 Shy released "Azonto Girl", produced by Ghanaian-British producer Rude Boy, helping spread the genre and dance to the United States.

=== Banku music ===
Banku music is a subgenre of afrobeats pioneered by Mr Eazi. The core of the genre is Ghanaian highlife bounce while mixing them with Nigerian chord progressions, then mixed in with various other genre influences such as reggae, R&B, and hip-hop. Mr Eazi's style is also mellowed and laid back, with heavy usage of Pidgin English, and percolating rhythms. The genre is called 'Banku' in reference to the Ghanaian dish. The dish contains a multitude of different ingredients, much like how Banku is a fusion of various genres. Eazi credited Ghana for the mellowed sound in his music, in contrast to the typical high energy of Lagos, Nigeria.

=== Pon Pon ===
Pon Pon is a subgenre that was briefly the main sound in the Nigerian afropop music scene during the mid-2010s. The subgenre has been used to describe songs influenced by dancehall and highlife. Sess The Problem Kid, a producer, characterised the genre by its "mellow vibe and soft-hitting synths, mostly in pairs". The name of the subgenre is an onomatopoeia of the synths that feature in Pon Pon songs. There has however been confusion over exactly what defines the subgenre. It's unknown exactly where the genre originated, but Tekno's song "Pana" has been credited for popularising the sound. Krizbeatz, one of the producers behind "Pana", instead prefers to call the genre "Afro Dance Music" (ADM), denoting the influence of EDM.

Davido's songs "If" and "Fall" both fall under the Pon Pon subgenre. Other songs include "Mad Over You" and "For Life" by Runtown, "Away" by P-Square, "Medicine" and "Odoo" by Wizkid, "Gaga Shuffle" by 2Baba, "Mama" by Mayorkun, "Ma Lo" by Tiwa Savage, "Jeje" by Falz, and "Ur Waist" by Iyanya.

The subgenre began to fade away by the late 2010s.

== Fusion and derivative genres ==
=== Afropiano ===
Afropiano (a portmanteau of afrobeats and amapiano), sometimes called Naija-Amapiano, is a fusion of the South African genre amapiano with afrobeats.

In the early 2020s, Afropiano became one of the most popular forms of afrobeats. One of the most well-known afropiano songs that helped popularize the style of music in its earlier days is the track "Monalisa" by Lojay and Sarz. The song entered the top 10 list on the Billboard U.S. Afrobeats Songs chart and became the most Shazamed afrobeats song globally in 2021. Other afropiano songs include "Champion Sound" by Davido and Focalistic, "Amapiano" by Asake and Olamide, and "Go Low" by L.A.X.

=== Afrosoca ===
Afrosoca is a fusion genre of afrobeats and soca music with some influences from dancehall. The genre was pioneered in Trinidad & Tobago by Nigerian and Trinidadian artists. The genre has been pioneered by artists such as Olatunji, Machel Montano, and Timaya. Olatunji's song "Ola" was one of the most popular songs in Trinidad's 2015 carnival season, leading Olatunji to earn the prize "Groovy Soca Monarch" for his performance at the International Soca Monarch competition. Another notable song is the remix of "Shake Your Bum Bum" by Timaya and Machel Montano released in 2014, which was a hit in Trinidad. By 2016, a wave of Afro Soca songs were released coinciding with the years carnival season in Trinidad. Notable songs include Olatunji's "Oh Yah" and Fay-Ann Lyons and Stonebwoy B's song "Block D Road".

Shakira Marshall, a New York-based choreographer, has been credited with coining the name 'afrosoca' for her dance class in 2012 in order to describe the unique fusion of Western, Southern and Central African, and Caribbean dance styles she was teaching. Afrosoca songs typically have a similar tempo to Groovy Soca (110 to 135 BPM), often with West African-influenced melodies.

Gospel singer and songwriter Isaac Blackman and DJ Derek "Slaughter" Pereira have both criticised the name and the implication that it's a new sound, particularly due to the fact that the origins of soca are African music to begin with.

=== Afroswing ===
Afroswing, also known as Afrobashment, is a British genre that developed in London around 2014. The genre is derivative of afrobeats, mixing it with various influences from British dancehall, grime, R&B, trap, and hip-hop. British rapper J Hus and producers such as Jae5, Blairy Hendrix, Joshua Beatz have been credited for pioneering the new sound. The genre has commercially been very successful in the UK.

Afroswing is largely defined by its melody rather than a specific tempo. Producer Steel Banglez stated the key elements of afroswing were happy or dark chords that "make you feel a certain way", and that "drum pattern is the most important thing about this whole sound, it's the snare that comes on the third. In hip-hop it comes on the fourth. Coming off the third beat comes from afrobeats".

Martin Connor, an expert in vocal melodies and rap analysis, described the characteristics of the genre as being "[..] technically in 4/4, what you will hear over and over again is this recurring pattern made up of three notes that are still repeated in the framework of a 4/4 time signature [..] You can hear the inspirations of Jamaican music in the rhythm except Jamaican music doesn't have a bass kick and the snare – that's hip hop, that's traditional rap. So this is that translation of cultures happening subtly in the instrumentation. Yet it still has a hip hop sensibility in terms of lyrical focus and music videos: cars, money, authenticity, hardness".

=== Bakosó ===
In Cuba, a new genre of music known as Bakosó emerged in the mid-2010s pioneered in Santiago de Cuba by artists such as Ozkaro and Maikel el Padrino and producers like Kiki Pro. Africans who were studying in Cuba helped influence local Cuban artists by introducing them to African genres, leading to the creation of Bakosó, a fusion of genres such as afrobeats, kuduro, and azonto with local Cuban genres such as rumba and conga. An artist named Inka has been credited with coining the name of the genre. Originally the word "Bakosó" was used to mean "party". In 2019, Havana-based DJ Jigüe debuted a documentary titled "Bakosó: AfroBeats of Cuba" (or "Bakosó: Afrobeats de Cuba") about the genre at various film festivals, until it was globally released in 2021.

=== Afro trap ===
Afro trap (also written as "Afro-trap") is a genre that takes inspiration from both Sub-Saharan African music traditions and modern rap music. The genre was coined in the mid-2010s by French rapper MHD. MHD, who is of West African descent, stated he judged the world of French-language rap was too much influenced by American trends, so he decided to create Afro-Trap by incorporating elements of West African culture, such as traditional music and languages such as Fula or Wolof. The genre is only very loosely influenced by trap music.

The genre has since spread across Europe, especially in Germany where artists such as Bonez MC and RAF Camora have been pushing the genre, however with a heavier lean towards dancehall than afrobeats. The German variation of the genre has been criticized by Ghanaian Stallion for the lack of actual African influences, with the only thing remaining being a dancey rhythm.

=== Alté ===
The late 2010s saw the emergence of a new commercially successful Nigerian genre, Alté, which fused a wide array of influences from Afrobeats, rap, R&B, soul, dancehall, and others. The term was coined by DRB LasGidi member BOJ on his 2014 song "Paper", and was later used to describe left field styles of music. TeeZee explained the term saying "Alté is Nigerian lingo for 'alternative' which means freedom of expression essentially through any medium. It's been going on since the '60s as Africans always experimented with music. It became recognised as a style or genre from about 2012 upwards and it broke into the mainstream in 2016 with the rise of its new stars." Other Alté artists and pioneers include Cruel Santino, Odunsi (The Engine), Zamir, Tems, Lady Donli, Nonso Amadi, Tay Iwar, 66ixx and Amaarae.

== See also ==
- Afrobeat
- Afroswing
- Bongo Flava
- Dancehall
- Hiplife
- Music of Ghana
- Music of Nigeria
