= Vibe Squad =

British music group

- Origin: London, England
- Genres: Afropop, Afro house, Afrobeats
- Years active: 2007 - 2015
- Members: Kelvin Amoako; William Osei Obengo
- Past members: Derrick Abaitey; Bright Oduro; Richard Korede
- Website: http://www.vibesquadofficial.com/

Vibe Squad is a British music group formed in 2009. The group was initially set up as a quintet consisting of Kelvin Amoako, William Osei- Obengo, Derrick Abaitey and Richard Korede and Bright Oduro who were all students at NewVic Sixth Form College in the London Borough of Newham. Bright Oduro (alias: Rudboi) was the first to leave the group in pursuance of a career in music production. The music group Vibe Squad (V.S) formed in East London started with 5 boys but towards the end only had 2 - Kelvin and Wizzy. Vibe Squad are one of the earliest artists from London to bring Afrobeats to UK’s mainstream and are widely accepted among the likes of DJ Abrantee Fuse ODG Kwamz N Flava and Mista Silva as pioneers of UK Afrobeats. Notable track are “Wadi Mi Sika”,”Come Over” and “Craze” .
