= Africa Social Impact Summit =

African non-governmental initiative

Africa Social Impact Summit (ASIS)
- Formation: 2022
- Type: Non-profit organization (NGO)
- Headquarters: Lagos, Nigeria
- Parent organization: The Sterling One Foundation
- Website: https://www.theimpactsummit.org

Africa Social Impact Summit (ASIS) is an African non-governmental initiative launched in 2022 in Lagos, Nigeria. ASIS is co-convened by the United Nations in Nigeria and Sterling One Foundation alongside other private sector and development organizations. It is a convening for inclusive development that provides an opportunity for developing market-led solutions to Africa's social challengers. It is a conventional initiative of private and public organizations convening for regional inclusive development conversations. They organize annual summits to dialogue various possible means that translates to providing solutions to issues undermining African development. It had over 3,000 registrants from 66 countries and had 13 entrepreneurs from 4 African countries pitch at the Deal Room in 2023.

== Background ==
The 2023 ASIS summit hosted leaders including the United Nations Resident and Humanitarian Coordinator in Nigeria, Matthias Schmale who highlighted the need for Africa to effectively focus more attention on the most vulnerable issues bothering the society as Africa is the most affected by the growing unemployment, spiraling inflation, climate change and insufficient access to quality education and health services. While setting up plans for 2024 ASIS summit, the UN in Nigeria led by the Resident Coordinator, Assistant Secretary-General Mohamed Fall, informed that they would be committed to stimulate and empower the private sector for stronger partnerships and more impactful investments towards the acceleration of the Sustainable Development Goals. The summit ushered in members from different public and private sectors, civil society organizations and development community who met with the aims of finding innovative, sustainable and lasting solutions to Africa's key developmental challenges. The summit organized by the Sterling One Foundation and the United Nations system in Nigeria also engages in conversations that will provide opportunities for private sectors and equality impact investors. ASIS represents a direct action towards the achievement of the Sustainable Development Goals in Africa, through the effective collaboration of all key players within the African development ecosystem to achieve market-led solutions for the growth of the continent, favourable policies that support them and investments that help them scale.

== ASIS 2022 ==
The convention was first launched on 13 July 2022 in Abuja, the Nigerian capital as a co-initiative of Sterling One Foundation and the UN Global Compact Network Nigeria. Other official partners include Sterling Bank, The Coca-cola Company, Impact Investors Foundation, VDF Group, Giving, Nigeria Climate Innovation Centre, the Nigerian Economic Summit Group (NESG), ProShare, TechCabal and Ventures Africa. It witnessed login of many participants including investors, policymakers, academics, NGO's, business leaders from public and private sectors, chamber of commerce, including also representatives from the international community. The 2022 summit also hosted global dignitaries including the likes of Naomi Nwokolo, UN Global Compact Network Nigeria and Chair, African Regional Network Council of the UN Global Compact who called for collaborative efforts amongst leaders of all sectors in meeting up with the sustainable Development Goals (SDGs). Others present were, Abubakar Suleiman, MD, Sterling Bank and Board Member, Sterling One Foundation, Sanda Ojiambo, assistant secretary-general and CEO of UN Global Compact. Also was in the summit, Mathias Schmale, UN resident and humanitarian coordinator in NIgeria; Patricia Obazuwa, vice president, public affairs, communications and sustainability, Africa, Coca cola. Group discussions were formed, giving participants the opportunity to engage more the terms of impact investing, education, primary healthcare, climate action, governance, gender equality and youth development. Amongst many other Nigerian public servants who attended the summit were, Babajide Sanwo Olu, Lagos state governor, Zainab Ahmed, minister of finance, budget and national planning, Dabesaki Mac-Ikemenjima, senior program officer, Ford foundation, Daniel Ikuenobe, country director, Tony Blair institute, Malawi. Furthermore, Olapeju Ibekwe, CEO Sterling One Foundation, Femi Taiwo, board member, UN Global Network Nigeria, Mories Atoki, CEO African Business Coalition for Health, and many others.

== ASIS 2023 ==
The second edition of Africa Social Impact Summit was held on 10 and 11 August 2023 at Lagos state, Nigeria. The summit was themed "Global vision, location action: Repositioning the African development ecosystem for sustainable outcomes." Like ASIS 2022, it too featured many global leaders, private sectors and policymakers. It engaged many players of African development space to share and brainstorm ideas, learnings and plans to fulfill the UN goals on SGDs. The second edition was a continuation of the previous convention held in 2022.

== ASIS 2024 ==
The third edition of the held on 25 and 26 July 2024 in Lagos Nigeria with about 5000 participants.

== Partners ==
- Sterling One Foundation
- United Nations Nigeria
- United Nations Global Compact
- British Council
- Lagos state
- Sterling Bank
