= Tanimu Yakubu Kurfi =

Nigerian economist

Director General of the Budget Office
- Incumbent
- Assumed office 2024
- President: Bola Ahmed Tinubu
- Preceded by: Ben Akabueze

Personal details
- Education: Wagner College, Staten Island, New York
- Occupation: Economist

Tanimu Yakubu Kurfi (born 1961) is a Nigerian economist from Kurfi, Katsina State in Nigeria. On 13th June, 2024, President Bola Ahmed Tinubu appointed him as the Director General, Budget office of the Federation. From 1999 to 2002, Tanimu Yakubu Kurfi served as Commissioner of Finance, Budget, and Economic Planning in Katsina State. .

== Early life and education ==
Tanimu Yakubu Kurfi was born on April 30, 1961, in Kurfi, Nigeria. He attended Wagner College, from which he received a Bachelor of Science in economics (1984) and a Master of Business Administration in finance (1986).

== Career ==
From 1999 to 2002, Tanimu Yakubu Kurfi served as Commissioner of Finance, Budget, and Economic Planning in Katsina State. From 2003 to 2007, he served as Managing Director/Chief Executive Officer of the Federal Mortgage Bank of Nigeria.

From 2007 to 2010 he served as the Chief Economic Adviser to President Umaru Yar'adua. On June 13, 2024, President Bola Tinubu appointed Kurfi as the director-general of the budget office of the federation. Kurfi succeeded Ben Akabueze, who had been in office since 2016.
