= May7ven =

Nigerian singer and songwriter

- Born: May Odegbami; Ibadan, Nigeria
- Genres: Afrobeats, pop, hip hop, funk
- Occupations: Singer, songwriter, dancer model, producer, entrepreneur & Developer
- Instruments: Singing, drums
- Years active: 2000 – present
- Labels: Best Entertainment (2004–2009); Skata Records/ABM (2010-2012); M7 Music Group
- Website: www.may7ven.co.uk

May Odegbami, known professionally as May7ven, is a Nigerian-born singer, songwriter, dancer, producer, actress, model and entrepreneur.

== Early life and education ==
May7ven was born in Ibadan, Nigeria to Nigerian footballer Chief Segun Odegbami, and a Nigerian mother, Jumoke Tejumola, an accountant and ex-athlete. She attended Bodija International School before relocating to the UK at the age of six with her mother, her brother Junior Odegbami and sister Funmi Odegbami, CEO of MINK Cosmetics LLP. May7ven has other siblings, Tolu Odegbami, Steven Odegbami, Mo Odegbami and Tito Odegbami who live in Nigeria with their mothers.

During her adolescence, May studied music, sound engineering, building surveying and architecture. She joined her church choir when she was 10 and started teaching street dance at her local community centre in Kensal Green at age 14. She landed her first job as an estate agent and property developer at age 17 whilst pursuing her studies and music career.

== Career ==
She debuted in 2008 in the UK with single Hands Up, which she co-wrote with songwriter and producer Aeon 'Step' Manahan.

In May 2009 Take off my clothes/Bo Aso La Ra Mi, released under her own label Best entertainment, produced and co-written by Aeon Manahan and May7ven was released in the UK and Nigeria. The single included remixes by Colin Emmanuel and pioneer musik. The video was directed by Ben Peters and produced by Luti Media. May7ven renowned for her acrobatic African dance displays, street dance, tap infused with traditional Nigerian dance steps. Her 2009 video for single "Bo Aso La Ra mi" charted no.5 Nigerian Charts Nigeezy and Ben TV for 20 weeks, Music Africa, Hip on TV, Soundcity Top 10 for 12 weeks and Top 10 MTV Base UK, Europe and Africa, Channel AKA for six weeks.

In February 2009, May7ven teamed up with DJ Abrantee as her tour DJ in Nigeria and the UK. In April 2009, May7ven signed to African Mobile Giants Globalcom as an ambassador and embarked on an 18 city tour for six months. May7ven performed for the president of Nigeria at Aso Rock in Abuja August 2009. May7ven won her 1st award at the NMVA (Nigerian Music Video Award 2009) for Best Video in Europe and the 1st female to win that category. She secured endorsements with Guinness, ExxonMobil, Zain, Nigerian Bureaus and Nigerian Law Bar Association. In 2012, May7ven released 'TEN TEN' under Skata Records, and 'Hey Mr' in 2013 under M7 Music Group. Both Singles were Playlisted on Choice FM, now known as Capital Xtra for six weeks and received heavy rotation across multiple UK radio stations. On 7 May 2014, May7ven release single 'Werk' which was awarded Best UK Afrobeats Promotional Single at the Screen Nations Awards and single 'What Ur Feeling' both produced by TY Mix.

=== 1997–2020: Songwriting and backing vocals ===
At age 15, May7ven started as a songwriting and backing singer. In 1997 provided backing vocals for Phoebe One, Wayne Marshall, Ebony, LLoydie Crucial and KRS1. May7ven provided backing vocals on three tracks of RnB Singer Jamelia's 2000 debut Album Drama on tracks 'Money', 'One Fine day' and 'Bout it' feat. Rah Digga produced by Colin Emmanuel. She later went on to work with, tour and supported Blu Cantrell, Beverley Knight, Mary J Blige, Angie Stone Stevie Brookstein. Akon, Joe Thomas plus others. In summer of 2008 May7ven performed for the Jacksons Jacksons Marlon Jackson at the La Campaign Tropicana in Lekke, Nigeria. In 2009, May7ven was commissioned to write and produce several programmes and theme music for TV and films including the 1st Eko Awards, Abuja Festival, The 1st Annual Gospel Music Awards UK 2009. In 2010 May7ven created, produced and co directed The DJ Abrantee Show on Sky TV with Rex chosen as the Director. In 2011 May7ven teamed with producer Antoine Stone to complete works on her album which included recording an Afrobeats single "Ten Ten" released in May 2012. In 2012, May7ven created the platform "Search for an Afrobeats Superstar" which became a TV show in Africa and UK in 2014. In 2014, May7ven created the Afrobeats News on Capital Xtra and hired Beat FM's top presented Toolz to anchor during DJ Abrantee's Afrobeats Radio Show. In 2018 May7ven started working with Music producer Silverston on new music.

=== Performances ===
2008 performed in New York venue Sugar Bar owned by Mowtown singers Ashford & Simpson, Opened up for Grandmaster Flash at the Ingenuity Festival in Cleveland Ohio to various performances in London. May7ven also performed at the 1st 'Koko Concert' by Dbanj and the Mo Hits at Indigo2 held at the O2 arena in London. This concert consisted of African star D'Banj, Don Jazzy and the rest of the Mo Hits squad with May7ven as the only female artist. In Oct 2009 May7ven headlined 5 Nigerian Independence Day concerts over a 2-day period in London & Dublin. In 2009 May7ven headlined her first show in Sweden's Fryshusset performing to over 4000 students and at The Sound Factory, Street Soul TV in Germany and sang the National Anthem of Nigeria Opening the Shell World Cup Football tournaments to over 40,000 spectators in Lagos. An hour Special on May7ven was broadcast on The Bisi Olatilo's Show ON 7TH May 2009 . In March 2011 May7ven performed on the IDOLS WEST AFRICA Live show in Nigeria where she debuted her 3rd single "Number". In June 2011 May7ven Joined Ginuwine and J.holiday to perform at The O2 Arena where she introduced single "Number". In August 2011 May7ven performed in the 1st UK Afrobeats Festival being the only female artist on the bill along with Wizkid, P-Square and Ice Prince to over 5000 spectators, including Akon, Mobo founder Kanya King, Tim Westwood and more. In October 2011 May7ven performed at the MTN 10th-anniversary show in Lagos. In January 2012 May7ven performs a new to be released single "Ten Ten" at the Afrobeats Sunday event at IndigO2 with Iceprince, Hosted by DJ Abrantee. In 2016 May7ven headlined the Afrobeats Music Festival at Indigo at the O2.

May7ven set up a number of charities for children including TMACC (The Mathematical African Children's Charity) and is also a part of the International Sports & Music Academy in Wasinmi, Nigeria (her ancestral home) owned by her father Segun Odegbami. May7ven is also the co-founder of SistasUnite Charity for women and children founded in April 2014. In April 2018 May7ven co-founded The Abrantee Boateng Foundation.

=== Present ===
In March 2016, May7ven released new single entitled 'Better days' under M7 Music Group accompanied by an animated video tackling mental health amongst young people. In 2014 May7ven and her father produced the first 'May7ven Home Coming'in Abeokuta, Nigeria headlined by May7ven featuring special guests, Seyi Seyi, Sound Sultan, Mr 2kay, Jimmy Jatt and many more at the 10,000 capacity Abeokuta Centre. In May 2014 May7ven executively produced a charity single 'SISTAS UNITE' in support of the Bringbackourgirls campaign in Nigeria. She signed UK producer Mictizzlebeats and Daniel Sync and lined up 14 African female artists to lend their voices to the cause which included Shiikane, Ezi Emela, Vicky Sola plus others. In April 2013, May7ven launched Afrobeats Live at Jazz Cafe hosted by Abrantee Boateng. An event that showcases Afrobeats Musicians on a Live Stage and TV Platform In March 2011 May7ven launched her own radio show on City FM 105.1 in Nigeria broadcasting each Friday from 8pm to 10pm co produced by DJ Abrantee. The radio show was presented by May7ven for two hours playing her Top 7 music count down, music from across the world and Live interviews with other artists. In March 2011, May7ven signed to Malta Guinness and Endemol as a judge on the hit TV Show's 4th season of The Malta Guinness Street Dance Africa 4 2011 along with judges Wale Rubber and Franklyspeaking. May7ven launched her 3rd single entitled "Number" produced by Step of Badself Entertainment, remixed, mixed and mastered by Ayodele Basil aka Delb in Nigeria in May 2011. In March 2012, May7ven's unreleased single "Ten Ten" was A-Listed on UK's Choice FM Radio making it the 2nd Afrobeat song to be playlisted on a UK Commercial Radio, after Dbanj's "Oliver Twist" in 2013 May7ven founded M7 Music Group, Afrobeats Live, CDN, May Zing white Hair line and Created of Afrobeats Search for a Star in September 2013 with Abrantee Boateng.

== Tour history ==
- 2008 How We Does Tour – Germany, Sweden
- 2009 Globalcom Rock n Rule Tour
- 2009 Koko Concert with D'banj and Mo Hits
- 2010 Koko Concert with D'banj and Mo Hits
- 2011 Afrobeats Club & Festival Tour
- 2014 UK School Tour (Anti Bullying & Sistas Unite)

== TV presenting ==
- Star Host 1 Hour Special – Soundcity Music Channel 2009
- Naija's TOP 10 Count Down – Nigeezy with Andre Blaze
- Ben TV's Top 10 Count Down – Sky TV
- Atunda Half Hour Special – Biscon, Bisi Olatilo Show
- Malta Guinness Street Dance Africa 2010 – Celebrity Guest Judge
- Malta Guinness Street Dance Africa 2011 – Judge
- Fame Music presents Afrobeats Search for a Star Judge 2015 – Judge

== Awards and nominations ==
Year	Institution	Award
2009	NMVA Awards 2009	Won Best Video in Europe
2009	African Film Awards	Won Best Artist
2009	NYAA (Nigerian Young Achievers Awards)	Won Best New Artist
2009	NMA (Nigerian Music Award UK)	Won Best New Female Artist
2009	M&M Awards 2009	Won Excellence Awards
2009	AMA (African Movie Awards)	Nominated – Best Artist
2010	Museke Africa 2010	Nominated – Best African Artist in the Diaspora
2010	African Music Awards 2010	Nominated – Best African Artist in the Diaspora
2010	African Film Awards (Afrohollywood) 2010	Winner – Outstanding Contribution to Music
2011	Nigerian Promoters Association (NPA USA) 2011	Nominated – Best International Music Act
2011	Nigerian Entertainment Award (NEA USA) Sept 2011	Nominated – Best International Artist
2012	Woman 4 Africa (W4A) 2012	Winner – Recognition award for music contribution
2012	Nigerian Entertainment & Lifestyle Award (NEL UK) Sept 2012	Winner – Best Breakthrough Artist
2012	BEFFTA Awards	Winner – Best UK Afrobeats Artist
2015	Screen Nation Awards	Winner – Best UK Afrobeats promo
2018	Nigerian News Awards	Special Recognition Awards – Outstanding business and artistic contribution to African music
