= Mista Silva =

British-Ghanaian music artist

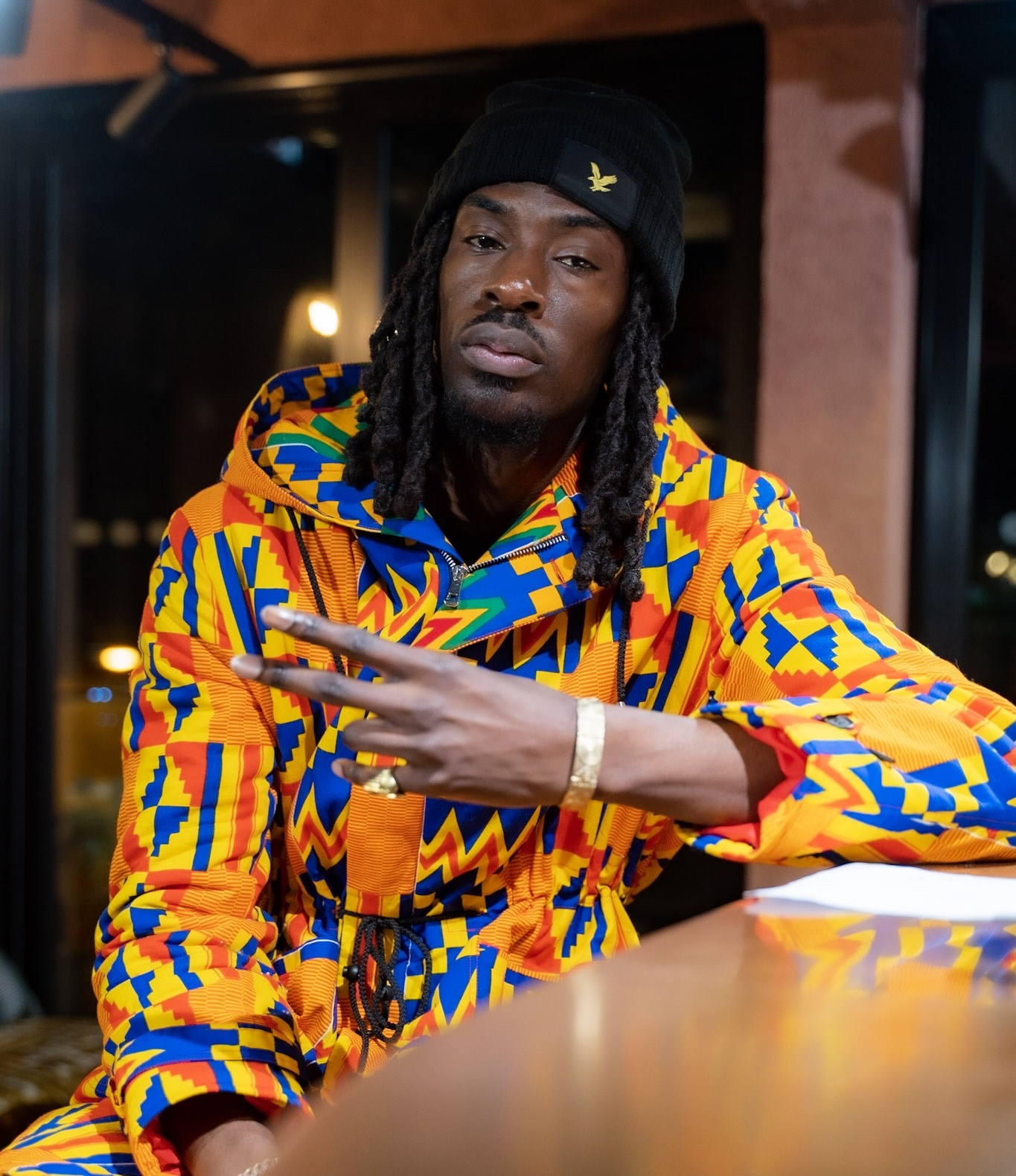

Background information
- Born: Papa Kwame Amponsa; London, England
- Origin: Accra, Ghana
- Genres: UK funky, Afrobeats, Afro house, dance, Hip hop, Hip House, Urban
- Occupations: Singer-songwriter, musician, rapper, model, fashionista
- Years active: 2011–present

Papa Kwame Amponsa, known by his stage name Mista Silva, is a British-Ghanaian musician from Brockley, London with origins from West Africa Ghana. Mista Silva released his debut EP, Full Vim, in 2012. Its success led to a record single deal with Polydor universal in 2014. He was the first unsigned UK Afrobeats artist to have his music playlisted by BBC 1Xtra, with well received tracks "Boom Boom Tah" and "Now Wats Up" . He has had his music played by national radio stations such as Capital Xtra and Kiss FM. As part of BBC 1Xtra's Destination Africa he performed on the BBC Live Lounge for Trevor Nelson He has walked for Fashion label Ashish and has been blogged about by fashion and culture publications I-D Magazine Fader, Complex, Notion and Wonderland. Mista Silva has also won a GUBA Award (Ghana UK Based Achievement), UMA (Urban Music Award), and three MOBO Award Nominations in the category of "Best African Act". When interviewed by popular online publication Noisey, BBC DJ Twin B, cited Mista Silva as one to watch for the future The Guardian newspaper also listed Mista Silva as one of eight Afrobeats artists to listen to.

== Discography ==
=== EPs & LPs ===
Title	Month/Year
Full Vim	June 2012
Let It Off	April 2015
Let It Off 2	November 2015
Out Of The Darkest	April 2018

== Singles ==
Title	Year	Album
"Bo won sem ma me" with Astar, Flava & Kwamz	2011	Non-album single
"Jump to the Party" ft Keche	2012	Full Vim
"Azonto Party" ft Stay Jay	2012	Full Vim
"No.1" - ft Skob & Cdon	2012	Full Vim
"Boom Boom Tah" ft Skob, Flava & Kwamz	2012	Full Vim
"Boom Boom Tah"	2012	Non-album single
"I Know You Like Am"	2013	Non-album single
"Now Wats Up"	2013	Non-album single
"Dance Low, Kutu Sa"	2013	Non-album single
"Today Na Today" ft Ghetto Boy	2014	
"Green Light" (featuring Syron)	2014	
"B.A.D"	2015	Let It Off
"Goes Down"	2015	Let It Off
"Rotate" (with Klayz)	2015	Let It Off 2
"Cool it down" ft E.L	2015	Non-album single
"Goes Down Rmx" ft Doneao, Ekeno	2016	Non-album single
"Murda"	2016	Non-album single
"Lifestyle"	2016	Non-album single
"O.M.G"	2016	Non-album single
"Mafia" (featuring Debrah Rose and HomeBros)	2016	Non-album single
"Feel My Wave" ft Mamy Dope	2017	Out of the darkest
"Strongbow"	2017	Out of the darkest
"Dont Give Up"	2018	Out of the darkest
"Oh Why"	2018	Non-album single
"Special Ting" Ft Jaij Hollands	2019	Non-album single
"Thinking"	2019	Non-album single
"Go Slow"	2019	Non-album single
"Blow"	2020	Non-album single
"Woso"	2020	Non-album single
"Dance With The Kings"	2020	Non-album single
"Koko" with KG	2021	Non-album single
"Amanfour" ft Novelist & Flow 'King' Stone	2021	Non-album single
"Wavy Level" ft E.L	2021	Non-album single
"Spirit"	2021	Non-album single
"Shea Jiggy"	2021	Non-album single
"Come Le Le"	2022	Non-album single
"REAP" Ft M.anifest	2022	Non-album single

== Features ==
Titile	Year	Artist
"Sweet Coco"	2013	Afro B
"Friday"	2013	Gizmo
"Fire"	2014	Donaeo
"Wa Di Mi Sika"	2014	Vibe Squad
"PMVD"	2015	Giaka
"Stream It"	2015	Sway
"Go Mad"	2015	Kwamz & Flava
"Arise Mama Africa"	2015	Guba
"Ogade"	2015	Showa Shins x Star Boy Willz
"They Know"	2016	P.Montana, Kojo Funds
"Kotisia Rmx"	2016	LDNC
"Goes Off"	2016	KSI
"Monsa"	2016	Aim
"Ijo"	2016	Luci Monet
"Power Rangers"	2016	A-star
"Thing For You"	2017	J-Hus
"Pattern Up"	2017	Mike Skinner
"Fear Nobody"	2017	Mitch STP
"Dont Do Dat"	2017	Pester
"Sunlight"	2017	L-vis
"oh lala"	2018	Mr Carlton & Andyman
"Winning Team"	2018	Roska
"Ma Lo"	2019	Kani & Brandz
"The System"	2021	Alvin Royce
"Are You Dumb"	2022	King Zion
"Crash Riddim"	2022	Scracthklart
"Nostalgia"	2022	Polo & Ramzee
"Radar"	2023	Valentine
