= Abubakar Suleiman =

Nigerian businessman (born 1973)

Managing Director/CEO, Sterling Bank Plc.
- Incumbent
- Assumed office April 2018

Personal details
- Born: 19 August 1973 (age 53) Nigeria
- Education: University of Abuja; University of Oxford
- Profession: Banker; Economist

Abubakar Suleiman (born 19 August 1973), popularly called Abu, is a Nigerian banking and economics professional and the current Managing Director/Chief Executive Officer of Sterling Bank, a leading nationally licensed commercial bank in Nigeria.

He succeeded Yemi Adeola, who retired from the bank on April 1, 2018.

== Early life ==
Abubakar grew up in Otukpo in the now Benue State. His father was a government worker who also had experience in journalism. His mother was a mother of 7 and trader.

He attended Government Secondary School, Otukpo. He later studied economics after an initial interest to study literature.

In 2019, he revealed in an interview with Arbiterz that he lost his father when he was 11 years old.

== Education ==
Abubakar has a Bachelor of Science (B.Sc.) degree in economics from the University of Abuja, as well as a Master of Science (M.Sc.) in Major Programs Management from Said Business School of the University of Oxford.

== Career ==
Abubakar's career has spanned roles in Financial Advisory, Treasury, Asset and Liability Management, Risk Management as well as Corporate Finance and Strategy.

Abubakar began his career with Arthur Anderson & Co. (now KPMG Nigeria) in 1996, and later joined MBC International Bank (now part of FBN Holdings) from Feb 1998 till Aug 1999. He later joined Citibank as a Trader, where his functions involved Currency & Securities Trading, Risk Asset Management & Distribution as well as Market Risk Management from January 2000 until October 2003.

Abubakar joined Sterling Bank in November 2003 as the Group Treasurer, a role he held until October 2011. He then transitioned into the double roles of Head, Interim Management, and Integration Director where he managed the acquisition and integration of Equatorial Trust Bank into Sterling Bank.

He then proceeded to become the Executive Director, Retail Banking, a role held between January 2013 till December 2014.

Along with his responsibilities as the Executive Director for Retail Banking, Abubakar was the Chief Financial Officer of the bank until March 2018. In April 2018, Abubakar was announced as the Chief Executive Officer for Sterling Bank.

He is a member of the Institute of Directors, governing council of the Chartered Institute of Bankers of Nigeria, member of the Nigerian Economic Summit Group committee for Agriculture and Food Security, and also serves on the advisory council of the Lagos Business School.

== Publications ==
While at Oxford University, Abubakar authored papers on Monetary Theory and Macroeconomic Management in Nigeria and on Gendered Leadership in Major Programs.

== Activism and philanthropy ==
Abubakar's interests revolve around youth empowerment and economic development, with grand ideas on key sectors to drive economic development and prosperity in Nigeria.

This has guided the design of the H.E.A.R.T. (Health, Education, Agriculture, Renewable Energy and Transportation) strategy for Sterling Bank, serving as a catalyst for the selection of sectors for investment for the bank, outside of traditional businesses.

== Awards and achievements ==
Abubakar recently became the first CEO in Nigeria to virtually ring the closing gong for the trading day at the Nigerian Stock Exchange.

Under his leadership, Sterling Bank has posted record profits with figures more than doubling the previous financial year's returns. The Bank was named as one of the top 100 places to work in Nigeria for 2018, also winning the Best Quality of Life Award for her human resource management practices under his leadership.

Abubakar was also named as one of the Top CEOs in Nigeria at the Businessday Annual Top CEO and Next Bulls awards 2020
