= Ashish =

Ashish or Aashish is a male given name common in India and Nepal. It is derived from the Sanskrit word आशिष् (āśiṣ), which means blessing or benediction.

Notable people with name include the following:

- Aashish Rana, Nepali singer and actor
- Aashish Chaudhary, Indian film actor
- Aashish Kapoor, Indian cricketer
- Ashish Bagai, Canadian cricketer
- Ashish Chauhan, Deputy Chief Executive Officer of Bombay Stock Exchange
- Ashish Jha Indian-American physician
- Aashish Khan, Indian Classical Musician, Sarod Virtuoso
- Ashish Khetan, Indian journalist and politician
- Ashish Kumar (gymnast), Indian gymnast
- Ashish Kumar Ballal, Indian hockey and Arjuna awardee
- Ashish Nehra, Indian cricketer, a bowler of fast-medium pace
- Ashish Patel, Canadian cricketer, a medium pace bowler
- Ashish Sharma, Indian actor
- Ashish Thakkar, Founder of Mara Group
- Ashish Vidyarthi, Indian actor
- Ashish Zaidi, Indian cricketer
