= Sterling Bank (Nigeria) =

Nigerian bank

Sterling Bank Ltd.
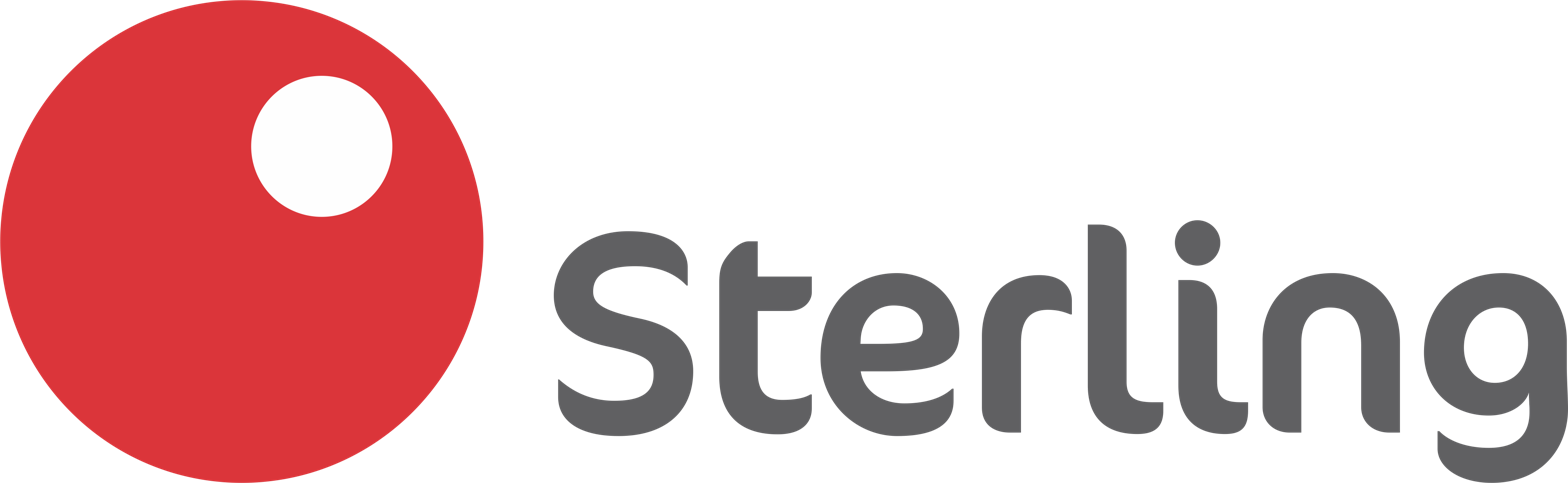
- Type: Limited Liability Company
- Industry: Banking
- Founded: 1960
- Headquarters: Sterling Towers, 20 Marina, P.M.B. 12735, Lagos, Lagos State, Nigeria
- Key people: Olatunji Mayaki Chairman; Abubakar Suleiman Managing Director/CEO
- Services: Retail Banking, Commercial Banking, Corporate Banking, Institutional Banking, Treasury, Trade Services, Digital Banking
- Operating income: ₦420.1 billion (FY 2025)
- Net income: ₦60.2 billion (FY 2025)
- Total assets: ₦3.53 trillion (FY 2025)
- Total equity: ₦373.4 billion (FY 2025)
- Number of employees: ~2,900 (FY 2025)
- Parent: Sterling Financial Holdings Company Plc.
- Website: https://sterling.ng/

Sterling Bank Ltd. is a Nigerian commercial bank licensed by the Central Bank of Nigeria. Headquartered at Sterling Towers, 20 Marina, Lagos, it is a wholly owned subsidiary of Sterling Financial Holdings Company Plc, alongside sister subsidiaries The Alternative Bank Limited (non-interest banking) and SterlingFI Wealth Management Limited (asset management). On Reuters and Bloomberg terminals, it is identified as STERLNB.LG and STERLNBA:NL respectively.

As of 31 December 2025, Sterling Bank serves more than 6.3 million customers and reported total assets of ₦3.53 trillion.

== History ==
Sterling Bank traces its origins to Nigeria Acceptances Limited (NAL), which was incorporated on 25 November 1960 as a private liability company. NAL was licensed in 1969 as Nigeria's first merchant bank. Following the Nigerian Enterprises Promotion (Indigenisation) Decree of 1972, the bank became fully government-owned, and from 1974 to 1992 it was managed in partnership with Grindlays Bank Limited, Continental International Finance Company of Illinois, and American Express Bank Limited. In April 1992, NAL was partially privatised and listed on the Nigerian Stock Exchange. In 2000, the federal government divested its residual interest, completing the privatisation.

Following the Central Bank of Nigeria's 2004 banking sector consolidation reforms, NAL Bank Plc completed a five-way merger with Indo-Nigerian Bank Limited, Magnum Trust Bank Plc, NBM Bank Limited, and Trust Bank of Africa Limited. NAL was the surviving entity and adopted the new name Sterling Bank Plc. Post-merger operations commenced on 3 January 2006, and the enlarged bank's shares continued to trade on the Nigerian Exchange.

In October 2011, Sterling Bank completed a business combination with Equatorial Trust Bank Limited. In line with the CBN's repeal of universal banking later that year, the bank divested its four subsidiaries and one associate company on 30 December 2011, transitioning to operate solely as a national commercial bank.

In 2016, Sterling Bank registered Sterling Investment Management Plc, a special-purpose vehicle for issuing bonds and other debt instruments, which remains a subsidiary consolidated in the Bank's financial statements.

In May 2023, Sterling Bank was re-registered as a private limited company. Its shares were delisted from the Nigerian Exchange on 6 April 2023. On 26 June 2023, the bank received final approval from the Central Bank of Nigeria to separate its non-interest banking business, formerly operated as the Sterling Alternative Finance window, into a standalone, fully licensed non-interest bank, The Alternative Bank Limited. On 27 June 2023, the CBN granted approval for the corporate restructuring, with Sterling Financial Holdings Company Plc emerging as the new parent listed on the Nigerian Exchange.

In 2024, Sterling Bank completed migration to SeaBaaS, described in the Bank's reporting as Africa's first indigenous core banking platform. According to the bank's 2025 annual report, the platform processed more than two billion transactions in 2025 with zero downtime and supported a 150% increase in customer adoption of digital channels.

Between December 2024 and October 2025, Sterling Financial Holdings completed a recapitalisation programme in response to the CBN's revised minimum capital requirements for commercial banks. The programme comprised a ₦75 billion private placement (December 2024), a ₦28.79 billion rights issue (oversubscribed by ₦10.29 billion), and a public offer of approximately ₦88 billion (October 2025). Of the total raised, approximately ₦99.97 billion was injected into Sterling Bank by its parent during 2025 alone, with final CBN approvals received in January 2026. The exercise was completed ahead of the March 2026 industry deadline.

== Corporate structure ==
Sterling Bank Limited is a wholly owned subsidiary of Sterling Financial Holdings Company Plc, the publicly listed parent that emerged from the 2023 restructuring. The group's other operating subsidiaries are:

- The Alternative Bank Limited: A fully licensed national non-interest bank serving Nigeria's ethical-finance market.
- SterlingFI Wealth Management Limited: An asset management subsidiary established to undertake capital market operations following revised SEC capital requirements in 2026.

Sterling Bank itself consolidates one subsidiary in its financial statements: Sterling Investment Management Plc, a special-purpose vehicle established in 2016 to issue bonds and debt instruments on behalf of the bank.

== Operations ==
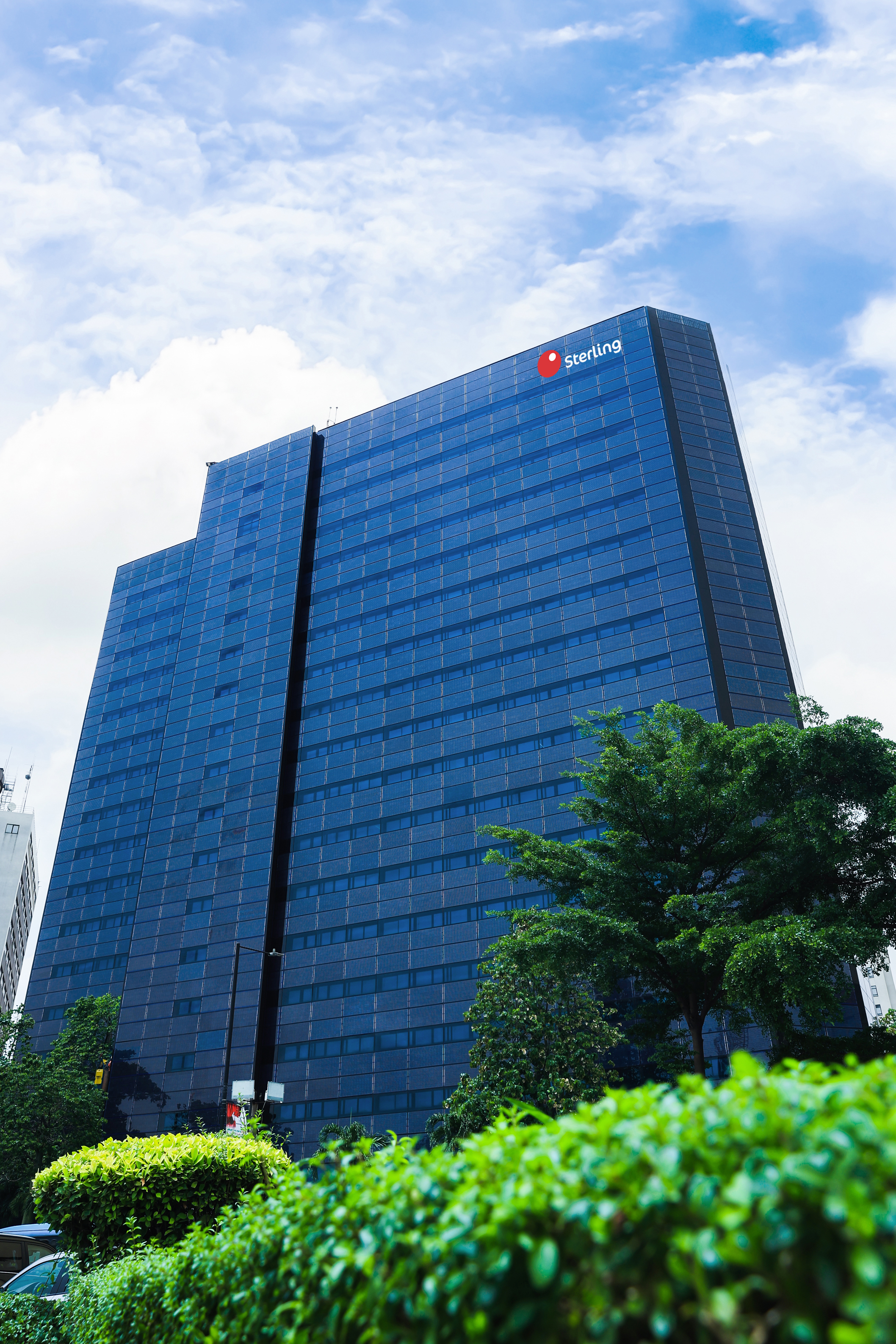
Sterling Towers, 20 Marina, Lagos, Nigeria.

The Bank’s businesses are organised around four customer clusters:

- Retail and consumer banking – including agent banking targeting the underbanked and unbanked, retail lending, and digital channels.
- Commercial banking – serving small and medium-sized enterprises, with particular emphasis on agriculture and food-security value chains.
- Institutional banking – providing advisory and collection services to government agencies and parastatals.
- Corporate banking – covering large corporate sectors including telecommunications, power, oil and gas, food and beverages, and infrastructure.

== HEART Strategy ==
Sterling Bank’s strategic investment framework is built around five sectors it terms HEART (Health, Education, Agriculture, Renewable Energy, and Transportation) identified as priority areas for Nigeria's development. In 2025, financing under the HEART framework grew by 39% year-on-year to ₦331.7 billion. Initiatives launched during the year included a ₦2 billion commitment to full tuition scholarships for 600 Nigerian students in collaboration with Miva Open University as part of the Bank’s ‘Beyond Education’ programme.

== Digital banking ==
The Bank’s principal digital banking platforms include OneBank and Specta, an automated retail lending platform. In 2025, Sterling eliminated transfer fees and account maintenance charges, an initiative the Bank credits with onboarding more than two million new customers during the year.

== Five-year financial summary (Group, ₦ millions) ==
	2025	2024	2023	2022	2021
Total assets	3,529,331	3,262,218	2,421,369	1,857,992	1,624,278
Customer deposits	2,698,767	2,361,995	1,747,510	1,327,805	1,208,753
Loans & advances	1,335,738	1,062,623	862,699	737,735	711,900
Gross earnings	420,149	296,961	211,561	175,140	150,153
Profit before tax	68,476	31,524	21,237	20,757	16,062
Profit after tax	60,163	30,766	20,398	19,298	15,022
Net assets / equity	373,393	265,276	160,355	153,998	136,559

== Sustainability and corporate social responsibility ==
Sterling Bank reports against environmental, social and governance (ESG) metrics in its annual reporting. 72 of its branches (a 5.9% year-on-year increase) and 202 of its ATMs (55% of its active network) are solar-powered. The Bank reported a 9.98% year-on-year reduction in Scope 1 and 2 greenhouse gas emissions to 5,701 tCO₂e in 2025.

The Bank co-hosts the annual Excel in Non-Oil Export Summit and Agric Summit Africa (ASA).

== Awards ==
Sterling Bank has received recognition across financial services, workplace culture, and sustainability categories. Some awards include:

=== 2025 ===
- Winner, Family-responsibility Workplace Practices (Institute for Work and Family Integration, in partnership with Lagos Business School)
- Best SME Bank Nigeria 2025 – Global Banking and Finance Awards
- Technology Sovereignty (Commercial Bank) Award – Nexus 2025 (for adopting the Qore SeaBaaS platform)
- Outstanding Healthcare Financial Institution of the Year – 2025 Nigerian Healthcare Excellence Awards

=== 2024 ===
- MSME Bank of the Year – MSME Finance Awards (The Economic Forum Series & Nairametrics)
- Highest Impact on Youth MSMEs – Development Bank of Nigeria
- DBN Platinum Service Award – Development Bank of Nigeria
- Excellence in HR Communication Strategy – HR Expo Africa Work Festival

=== 2023 ===
- Fastest Growing Company – Financial Times and Statista
- Overall Best Workplace in Nigeria (Large Category) – Great Place To Work Institute
- Best in Promoting Leadership Practices (Large Category) – Great Place To Work Institute
- Company Leadership Gender Diversity Award – Nigeria2Equal Programme (IFC & NGX)

=== 2022 ===
- BabyMigo Top 30 Workplaces for Mums in Nigeria
- Best Work-Life Harmony – HR People Magazine
- Victor Ligbago Award for Best Workplace for Millennials
- 5-Year Legends Award – Great Place To Work Institute

=== 2021 ===
- Best Workplace to Work in Nigeria (Large Corporates) – Great Place To Work Institute
- Best in Maximising Human Potential – Great Place To Work Institute
- Best in Building a Culture of Innovation – Great Place To Work Institute

=== 2020 ===
- Best Workplace to Work in Nigeria (Large Corporate)

=== 2019 ===
- Local Content Bank of the Year – Petroleum Technology Association of Nigeria (PETAN)
- Innovative Bank of the Year – Central Bank of Nigeria and Nigeria Inter-Bank Settlement Systems Plc

== See also ==
- List of Banks in Nigeria
- Central Bank of Nigeria
- Economy of Nigeria
- Sulaiman Adebola Adegunwa, former Chairman
